= The Crimes of Stephen Hawke =

1936 British film by George King

- Opening titles
- Directed by: George King
- Written by: Jack Celestin; Frederick Hayward; H. F. Maltby; Tod Slaughter; Paul White
- Starring: Tod Slaughter; Marjorie Taylor; D. J. Williams; Eric Portman; Graham Soutten
- Cinematography: Ronald Neame
- Edited by: John Seabourne Sr.
- Music by: Colin Wark (uncredited)
- Production company: George King Productions
- Distributed by: MGM
- Release date: May 1936
- Running time: 69 minutes
- Country: United Kingdom
- Language: English

The Crimes of Stephen Hawke is a 1936 British historical melodrama film directed by George King and starring Tod Slaughter, Marjorie Taylor, D. J. Williams and Eric Portman. It was written by Frederick Hayward from a scenario by Paul White.

This is the third of Tod Slaughter's film outings, billed as a 'new-old melodrama'. In the introduction Slaughter appears in person, in a BBC studio, where he describes with relish his murderous activities in his two previous films: Maria Marten or Murder in the Red Barn (1935) and Sweeney Todd: The Demon Barber of Fleet Street (1936).

== Premise ==
Slaughter plays a seemingly kindly money-lender who dotes on his daughter Julia. He has however a double life as the notorious 'Spine-Breaker', Victorian England's most maniacal serial killer. His nefarious activities are eventually detected by his daughter's suitor Matthew Trimble, the son of one of his victims, who after pursuing and failing to catch him somewhat charitably opines to his daughter:

Julia, Julia, my darling, listen to me. I know that he's the notorious 'Spine-Breaker' and he ought to be dead a hundred times but I also know that his death cannot bring my father back to life. But alive or dead it cannot alter my love for you.

In the end Slaughter comes out of hiding to kill another unwelcome suitor of his daughter, before falling to his death from the roof of his house in a dramatic final exit.

== Cast ==
- Tod Slaughter as Stephen Hawke
- Marjorie Taylor as Julia Hawke
- D.J. Williams as Joshua Trimble
- Eric Portman as Matthew Trimble
- Graham Soutten as Nathaniel
- Gerald Barry as Miles Archer
- George M. Slater as Lord Brickhaven
- Charles Penrose as Sir Franklin
- Norman Pierce as landlord
- Flotsam and Jetsam (Bentley Collingwood Hilliam and Malcolm McEachern) as themselves
- Cecil Bevan as small boys' father
- Annie Esmond as small boys' nanny
- Harry Terry as 1st prisoner in cell
- Ben Williams as prison warder

== Production ==
The film was made at Shepperton Studios, with sets designed by Philip Bawcombe.

== Reception ==
The Monthly Film Bulletin wrote: "An original note is struck by the addition of a prologue and epilogue. The melodrama forms part of a broadcast programme. At the beginning there is a song by Flotsam and Jetsam. This is followed by Tod Slaughter as himself in In Town To-night. After the play comes the conclusion of the broadcast programme. This is irrelevant but quite effective. The melodrama itself is put over in the only possible way in the traditional spirit of melodrama. The villain is black as night, and the heroine white as the driven snow. There is an appropriate accompaniment of ghastly cries and eerie chuckles. Tod Slaughter throws himself with zest into his part. The supporting cast is adequate, and the period settings are effective."

Kine Weekly wrote: "Hearty period thriller cast in the same colourful mould as The Demon Barber of Fleet Street. Tod Slaughter presents another grand portrait of diabolical villainy in the lead, and in his natural sense of burlesque is a sure shield against any danger of the play being taken too seriously. The supporting players also approach the fruity entertainment in the right spirit, and the honours are further shared by the director."
