= Melodrama =

Dramatic work that exaggerates plot and characters to appeal to the emotions

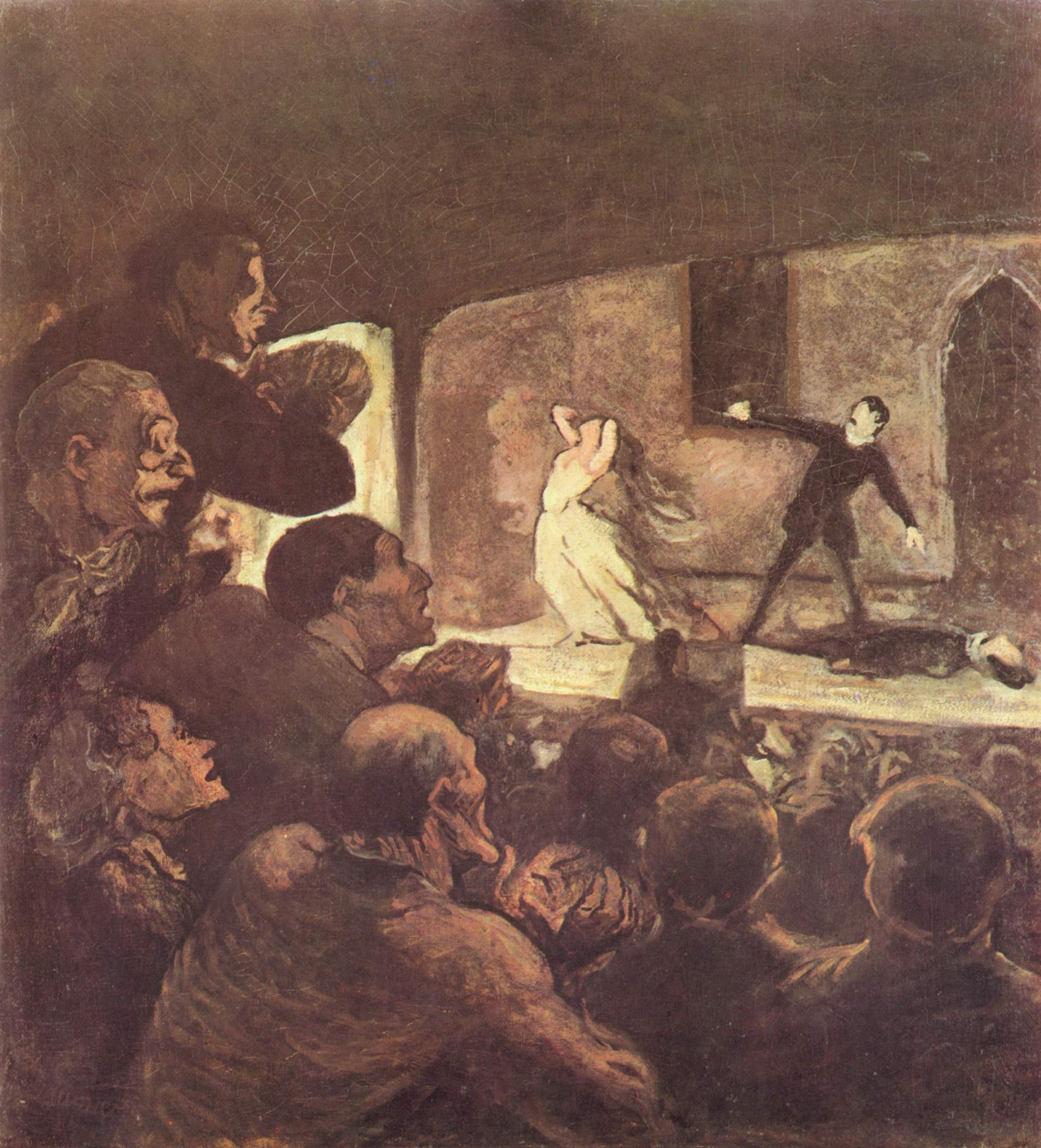
Mélodrame, painted by Honoré Daumier between 1855 and 1860, depicting a typical Parisian scene on Boulevard du Temple

A melodrama is a dramatic work in which plot, typically sensationalized for a strong emotional appeal, takes precedence over detailed characterization. Melodrama is "an exaggerated version of drama". Melodramas typically concentrate on dialogue that is often bombastic or extremely sentimental, rather than on action. Characters are often flat and written to fulfill established character archetypes. Melodramas are typically set in the private sphere of the home, focusing on morality, family issues, love, and marriage, often with challenges from an outside source, such as a "temptress", a scoundrel, or an aristocratic villain. A melodrama on stage, film, or television is usually accompanied by dramatic and suggestive music that offers further cues to the audience of the dramatic beats being presented.

In scholarly and historical musical contexts, melodramas are specifically Victorian dramas in which orchestral music or song was used to accompany the action. However the term melodrama is now also applied to stage performances (Victorian or otherwise) without incidental music, novels, films, television, and radio broadcasts that display the previously mentioned qualities. In modern contexts, the term melodrama is generally pejorative, as it suggests that the work in question lacks subtlety or character development. By extension, language or behavior that resembles melodrama is often called melodramatic, usually as a pejorative term.

== Etymology ==
The term was first used in English in 1784 (in 1782 as melo drame) and came from the French word mélodrame (c. 1772), which was itself derived from Greek μέλος ("song" or "music") and French drame ("drama").

== Characteristics ==
The relationship of melodrama and realism is complex. Protagonists of melodramatic works may be ordinary (and hence realistically drawn) people who are caught up in extraordinary events or highly exaggerated and unrealistic characters. With regard to its high emotions and dramatic rhetoric, melodrama represents a "victory over repression". Late Victorian and Edwardian melodrama combined a conscious focus on realism in stage sets and props with "anti-realism" in character and plot. Melodrama in this period strove for "credible accuracy in the depiction of incredible, extraordinary" scenes.

Melodramas focus on a victim. For example, a melodrama may present a person’s struggle between good and evil choices, such as a man being encouraged to leave his family by an "evil temptress". Stock characters include the "fallen woman", the single mother, the orphan, and the male who is struggling with the impacts of the modern world. The melodrama examines family and social issues in the context of a private home. Its intended audience is a female spectator, but a male viewer can also enjoy its presentation of resolved tensions in a home. Melodrama generally looks back at ideal, nostalgic eras emphasizing "forbidden longings".

Melodrama was associated with the rise of capitalism in the 19th century. French romantic drama and sentimental novels were popular in both the United Kingdom and France. These dramas and novels focused on moral codes in regard to family life, love, and marriage, and they can be seen as a reflection of issues brought up by the French Revolution, the Industrial Revolution and the shift to modernization. Many melodramas were about a middle-class young woman who experienced unwanted sexual advances from an aristocratic miscreant, the sexual assault being a metaphor for class conflict. The melodrama reflected post-Industrial Revolution anxieties of the middle class, who was afraid of both aristocratic power brokers and the impoverished working class "mob".

== Types ==
=== 18th-century origins: monodrama and duodrama ===
Melodrama arose in the second half of the 18th century as a genre intermediate between play and opera. It combined spoken recitation with short pieces of accompanying music. Music and spoken dialogue typically alternated in such works, although the music was sometimes also used to accompany pantomime. If there is one actor, the term monodrama may be used; if there are two— duodrama. It also sometimes appeared as a scene within a play or an opera. It was only later, in the nineteenth century, that the term lost its association with music and began to be used for plays with sentimental and sensational plots typical of popular Victorian drama.

The earliest known examples of melodrama are scenes in J. E. Eberlin's Latin school play Sigismundus (1753). The first full melodrama was Jean-Jacques Rousseau's monodrama Pygmalion, the text of which was written in 1762; it was first staged in Lyon in 1770. Rousseau composed the overture and an Andante, but the bulk of the music was composed by Horace Coignet.

A different musical setting of Rousseau's Pygmalion by Anton Schweitzer was performed in Weimar in 1772, and Goethe wrote of it approvingly in Dichtung und Wahrheit.

Some 30 other monodramas were produced in Germany in the fourth quarter of the 18th century. Georg Benda was particularly successful with his duodramas Ariadne auf Naxos (1775) and Medea (1775). The sensational success of Benda's melodramas led others to compose similar works. Mozart, for example, spoke approvingly of Benda's music and later used two long melodramatic monologues in his opera Zaide (1780).

Later and better-known examples of the melodramatic style in operas are the grave-digging scene in Beethoven's Fidelio (1805) and the incantation scene in Weber's Der Freischütz (1821).

=== English Restoration comedy ===
After the English Restoration of Charles II in 1660 lifted the Puritan ban on theatre, most British theatres were prohibited from performing "serious" drama but were permitted to show comedy or plays with music. Charles II issued letters patent to permit only two London theatre companies to perform "serious" drama. These were the Theatre Royal, Drury Lane and Lisle's Tennis Court in Lincoln's Inn Fields, the latter of which moved to the Theatre Royal, Covent Garden in 1720 (now the Royal Opera House). The two patent theatres closed in the summer months. To fill the gap, the Theatre Royal, Haymarket became a third patent theatre in London in 1766.

Further letters patent were eventually granted to one theatre in each of several other British towns and cities. Other theatres presented dramas that were underscored with music and, borrowing the French term, called it melodrama to get around the restriction. The Theatres Act 1843 finally allowed all theatres to play drama.

=== 19th century: operetta, incidental music, and salon entertainment ===
In the early 19th century, opera's influence led to musical overtures and incidental music for many plays. In 1820, Franz Schubert wrote a melodrama, Die Zauberharfe ("The Magic Harp"), setting music behind the play written by G. von Hofmann. It was unsuccessful, like all Schubert's theatre ventures, but the melodrama genre was at the time a popular one. In an age of underpaid musicians, many 19th-century plays in London had an orchestra in the pit. In 1826, Felix Mendelssohn wrote his well-known overture to Shakespeare's A Midsummer Night's Dream, and later supplied the play with incidental music.

In Verdi's La Traviata, Violetta receives a letter from Alfredo's father where he writes that Alfredo now knows why she parted from him and that he forgives her ("Teneste la promessa..."). In her speaking voice, she intones the words of what is written, while the orchestra recapitulates the music of their first love from Act I: this is technically melodrama. In a few moments, Violetta bursts into a passionate despairing aria ("Addio, del passato"): this is opera again.

In a similar manner, Victorians often added "incidental music" under the dialogue to a pre-existing play, although this style of composition was already practiced in the days of Ludwig van Beethoven (Egmont) and Franz Schubert (Rosamunde). (This type of often-lavish production is now mostly limited to film (see film score) due to the cost of hiring an orchestra. Modern recording technology is producing a certain revival of the practice in theatre, but not on the former scale.) A particularly complete version of this form, Sullivan's incidental music to Tennyson's The Foresters, is available online, complete with several melodramas, for instance, No. 12 found here. A few operettas exhibit melodrama in the sense of music played under spoken dialogue, for instance, Gilbert and Sullivan's Ruddigore (itself a parody of melodramas in the modern sense) has a short "melodrame" (reduced to dialogue alone in many productions) in the second act; Jacques Offenbach's Orpheus in the Underworld opens with a melodrama delivered by the character of "Public Opinion"; and other pieces from operetta and musicals may be considered melodramas, such as the "Recit and Minuet" in Gilbert and Sullivan's The Sorcerer. As an example from the American musical, several long speeches in Lerner and Loewe's Brigadoon are delivered over an accompaniment of evocative music. The technique is also frequently used in Spanish zarzuela, both in the 19th and 20th centuries, and continued also to be used as a "special effect" in opera, for instance Richard Strauss's Die Frau ohne Schatten.

In Paris, the 19th century saw a flourishing of melodrama in the many theatres that were located on the popular Boulevard du Crime, especially in the Gaîté. All this came to an end, however, when most of these theatres were demolished during the rebuilding of Paris by Baron Haussmann in 1862.

By the end of the 19th century, the term melodrama had nearly exclusively narrowed down to a specific genre of salon entertainment: more or less rhythmically spoken words (often poetry) – not sung, sometimes more or less enacted, at least with some dramatic structure or plot – synchronized to the accompaniment of music (usually piano). It was looked down on as a genre for authors and composers of lesser stature (probably also why virtually no realizations of the genre are still remembered) - though there are examples by Robert Schumann (Ballads for Declaration, 1850s) and Richard Strauss for narrator and piano (Enoch Arden (1897). The English composer Stanley Hawley made many such settings, some of which were performed at the first season of the Henry Wood Proms in London. It was probably also at this time when the connotation of cheap overacting first became associated with the term. As a cross-over genre-mixing narration and chamber music, it was eclipsed nearly overnight by a single composition: Schoenberg's Pierrot Lunaire (1912), where Sprechgesang was used instead of rhythmically spoken words, and which took a freer and more imaginative course regarding the plot prerogative.

=== Czech ===
Within the context of the Czech National Revival, the melodrama took on a specifically nationalist meaning for Czech artists, beginning roughly in the 1870s and continuing through the First Czechoslovak Republic of the interwar period. This new understanding of the melodrama stemmed primarily from such nineteenth-century scholars and critics as Otakar Hostinský, who considered the genre to be a uniquely "Czech" contribution to music history (based on the national origins of Georg Benda, whose melodramas had nevertheless been in German). Such sentiments provoked a large number of Czech composers to produce melodramas based on Czech romantic poetry, such as the Kytice of Karel Jaromír Erben.

The romantic composer Zdeněk Fibich in particular championed the genre as a means of setting Czech declamation correctly: his melodramas Štědrý den (1874) and Vodník (1883) use rhythmic durations to specify the alignment of spoken word and accompaniment. Fibich's main achievement was Hippodamie (1888–1891), a trilogy of full-evening staged melodramas on the texts of Jaroslav Vrchlický with multiple actors and orchestra, composed in an advanced Wagnerian musical style. Josef Suk's main contributions at the turn of the century include melodramas for two-stage plays by Julius Zeyer: Radúz a Mahulena (1898) and Pod Jabloní (1901), both of which had a long performance history.

Following the examples of Fibich and Suk, many other Czech composers set melodramas as stand-alone works based on the poetry of the National Revival, among them Karel Kovařovic, Otakar Ostrčil, Ladislav Vycpálek, Otakar Jeremiáš, Emil Axman, and Jan Zelinka. Vítězslav Novák included portions of melodrama in his 1923 opera Lucerna, and Jaroslav Ježek composed key scenes for the stage plays of the Osvobozené divadlo as melodrama (most notably the opening prologue of the anti-Fascist farce Osel a stín (1933), delivered by the character of Dionysus in bolero rhythm). Czech melodramas' practice tapered off after the Nazi Protectorate.

=== Victorian ===
The Victorian stage melodrama featured six stock characters: the hero, the villain, the heroine, an aged parent, a sidekick, and a servant of the aged parent engaged in a sensational plot featuring themes of love and murder. Often the good but not very clever hero is duped by a scheming villain, who has eyes on the damsel in distress until fate intervenes at the end to ensure the triumph of good over evil. Two central features were the coup de théàtre, or reversal of fortune, and the claptrap: a back-to-the-wall oration by the hero which forces the audience to applaud.

English melodrama evolved from the tradition of populist drama established during the Middle Ages by mystery and morality plays, under influences from Italian commedia dell'arte as well as German Sturm und Drang drama and Parisian melodrama of the post-Revolutionary period. A notable French melodramatist was Pixérécourt whose La Femme à deux maris was very popular.

The first English play to be called a melodrama or 'melodrame' was A Tale of Mystery (1802) by Thomas Holcroft. This was an example of the Gothic genre, a previous theatrical example of which was The Castle Spectre (1797) by Matthew Gregory Lewis. Other Gothic melodramas include The Miller and his Men (1813) by Isaac Pocock, The Woodsman's Hut (1814) by Samuel Arnold and The Broken Sword (1816) by William Dimond.

Supplanting the Gothic, the next popular subgenre was the nautical melodrama, pioneered by Douglas Jerrold in his Black-Eyed Susan (1829). Other nautical melodramas included Jerrold's The Mutiny at the Nore (1830) and The Red Rover (1829) by Edward Fitzball (Rowell 1953). Melodramas based on urban situations became popular in the mid-nineteenth century, including The Streets of London (1864) by Dion Boucicault; and Lost in London (1867) by Watts Phillips, while prison melodrama, temperance melodrama, and imperialist melodrama also appeared – the latter typically featuring the three categories of the 'good' native, the brave but wicked native, and the treacherous native.

The sensation novels of the 1860s, and 1870s not only provided fertile material for melodramatic adaptations but are melodramatic in their own right. A notable example of this genre is Lady Audley's Secret by Elizabeth Braddon adapted, in two different versions, by George Roberts and C.H. Hazlewood. The novels of Wilkie Collins have the characteristics of melodrama, his best-known work The Woman in White being regarded by some modern critics as "the most brilliant melodrama of the period".

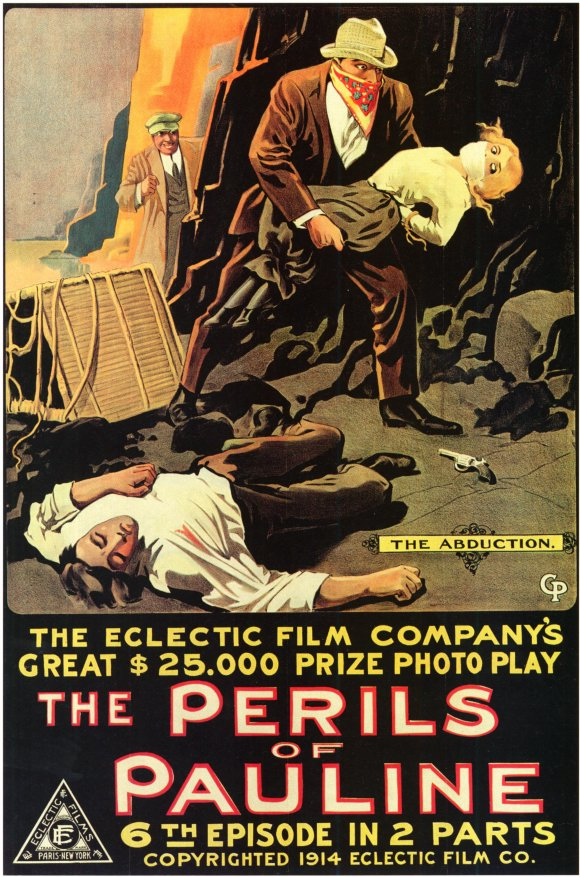
Poster for The Perils of Pauline (1914), a classic melodramatic film series

The villain is often the central character in melodrama, and crime was a favorite theme. This included dramatizations of the murderous careers of Burke and Hare, Sweeney Todd (first featured in The String of Pearls (1847) by George Dibdin Pitt), the murder of Maria Marten in the Red Barn and the bizarre exploits of Spring Heeled Jack. The misfortunes of a discharged prisoner are the theme of the sensational The Ticket-of-Leave Man (1863) by Tom Taylor.

Early silent films, such as The Perils of Pauline had similar themes. Later, after silent films were superseded by the 'talkies', stage actor Tod Slaughter, at the age of 50, transferred to the screen the Victorian melodramas in which he had played a villain in his earlier theatrical career. These films, which include Maria Marten or Murder in the Red Barn (1935), Sweeney Todd: The Demon Barber of Fleet Street (1936) and The Ticket of Leave Man (1937) are a unique record of a bygone art-form.

== Generic offshoots ==
- Northrop Frye saw both advertising and propaganda as melodramatic forms which the cultivated cannot take seriously.
- Politics at the time calls on melodrama to articulate a world-view. Thus Richard Overy argues that 1930s Britain saw civilization as melodramatically under threat - "In this great melodrama Hitler's Germany was the villain; democratic civilization the menaced heroine". While Winston Churchill provided the necessary larger-than-life melodramatic hero to articulate back-to-the-wall resistance during The Blitz.

=== Modern ===
Classic melodrama is less common than it used to be on television and in movies in the Western world. However, it is still widely popular in other regions, particularly in Asia and in Hispanic countries. Melodrama is one of the main genres (along with romance, comedy and fantasy) used in Latin American television dramas (telenovelas), particularly in Venezuela, Mexico, Colombia, Argentina and Brazil, and in Asian television dramas, South Korea, Japan, Taiwan, China, Pakistan, Thailand, India, Turkey and (in a fusion of the Hispanic and Asian cultures) the Philippines. Expatriate communities in the diaspora of these countries give viewership a global market.

=== Film ===
In film studies and criticism, melodrama may variously refer to a genre, mode, style or sensibility characterized by its emphasis on intense and exaggerated emotions and heightened dramatic situations. There is no fixed definition of the term and it may be used to refer to a wide and diverse range of films of other genres including romantic dramas, historical dramas, psychological thrillers or crime thrillers, among others.

Feminists have noted four categories of themes in the film melodrama: those with a female patient, a maternal figure, an "impossible love", and the paranoid melodrama. Most film melodramas from the 1930s and 1940s, at the time known as "weepies" or "tearjerkers", were adaptations of women's fiction, such as romance novels and historical romances. Drawing from a shared history with women's fiction, melodramatic films often concentrate on female perspectives and desires. From the 1930s until the late 1960s, Hays Code restrictions on the inclusion of "licentious" content in films would restrict the portrayal of female desire in the American film melodrama.

During the 1940s, the British Gainsborough melodramas were successful with audiences.

In the 1950s, films by director Douglas Sirk, such as All That Heaven Allows (1955) and Written on the Wind (1956), are representative of the genre. Many later melodramatic filmmakers cite Sirk and his works as significant influences.

In the 1970s, Rainer Werner Fassbinder, who was influenced by Sirk, contributed to the genre by engaging with issues within the cultural subconscious, addressing class in The Merchant of Four Seasons (1971) and Mother Küsters Goes to Heaven (1975), sexual orientation and codependency in The Bitter Tears of Petra von Kant (1972) and racism, xenophobia, and ageism in Fear Eats the Soul (1974).

The 1980s saw a resurgence in American "women's" melodramas such as Terms of Endearment (1983), Beaches (1988), and Steel Magnolias (1989). On television, the miniseries was a popular format for lavish, female-centric melodramas such as Scruples (1980), Lace (1984), and Sins (1986).

Melodramas like the 1990s TV Moment of Truth movies targeted audiences of American women by portraying the effects of alcoholism, domestic violence, rape and the like. Typical of the 90's melodrama is Anjelica Huston's 1999 film Agnes Browne.

Todd Haynes' films Far from Heaven (2002), Carol (2015), and May December (2023) are more recent takes on the melodrama. Contemporary director Pedro Almodovar has also taken many inspirations from the melodramatic genre and directors like Sirk.

== See also ==
- List of melodrama films
- Legal drama
- Newgate novel
- Pantomime
- Serial (radio and television)
- Soap opera
- Space opera
- Telenovela
- Very special episode
- Woman's film
