= All at Sea (1940 film) =

1940 British film by Herbert Smith

- Directed by: Herbert Smith
- Written by: Gerald Elliott; Reginald Long
- Produced by: Herbert Smith
- Starring: Sandy Powell; Kay Walsh; John Warwick
- Cinematography: Hone Glendinning
- Edited by: Jack Harris
- Music by: Louis Levy
- Production company: British Lion Film Corporation
- Distributed by: British Lion Film Corporation (UK)
- Release date: 5 February 1940 (UK)
- Running time: 76 minutes
- Country: United Kingdom
- Language: English

All at Sea is a 1940 British comedy film directed by Herbert Smith and starring Sandy Powell, Kay Walsh and John Warwick. It was written by Gerald Elliott and Reginald Long.

== Plot ==
On his way to deliver a message, bumbling chemical factory worker Sandy Skipton accidentally enlists in the navy, unaware that in his pocket is a dangerous new explosive. There he stumbles on spies, but somehow manages to save the day.

== Cast ==
- Sandy Powell as Sandy Skipton
- Kay Walsh as Diana
- John Warwick as Brown
- Gus McNaughton as Nobby
- George Merritt as Bull
- Leslie Perrins as Williams
- Franklin Dyall as Dr. Stolk
- Robert Rendel as Sir Herbert
- Aubrey Mallalieu as Prof. Myles

== Production ==
It was made at Beaconsfield Studios. The film's sets were designed by the art director Philip Bawcombe.

== Reception ==
The Monthly Film Bulletin wrote: "This is a cheerful, inconsequent medley of slapstick, humour and one quite tuneful song. Sandy Powell skips blithely through the most awkward situations, Gus McNaughton is adequate as his resourceful friend Nobby, and Kay Walsh attractive as the heroine."

Kine Weekly wrote: "Breezy naval comedy burlesque, utilising to the full the unique gifts and urbane humour of Sandy Powell. A cheery, happy-go-lucky plot, good gags, eager and resourceful team work and ambitious production qualities, are other considered and apt essentials."

The Daily Film Renter wrote: "Rousing fun of a robust type, with star at top of his bluff Yorkshire form. Co-operation of the Navy results in some realistic backgrounds."
