= H. F. Maltby =

British writer (1880–1963)

Henry Francis Maltby (25 November 1880 – 25 October 1963) was a prolific writer for the London stage and British cinema from after the First World War, until the 1950s. He also appeared in many films.

== Life and career ==
Born in Ceres, Cape Colony (later to be part of South Africa), Maltby was educated at Bedford School. He was married twice, to Billie Joyce and Norah M. Pickering. Maltby served in France, as a bombardier.

=== Playwriting career ===
On his return to Britain, Maltby wrote and performed in many plays for the West End theatre, some achieving success and transferring to Broadway. He wrote The Rotters in 1915, but it took nearly a year to get it to the provincial stage. The play was a success and transferred to the Garrick Theatre in the West End, playing for 86 performances and toured for the next decade, also being made into a film. The theme is satirical, dealing with a dysfunctional family and their minor 'sins' revolving around the father's obsessive respectability. The play received a tepid review from The Times, which found it formulaic, but it was popular with audiences. He also wrote an all-woman farce, Petticoats with women taking over the state (with the men away at war).

By 1919, Maltby was working on collaborations in musical theatre, with Fred Thompson adapting the libretto of the French Maggie by Étienne Rey and Jacques Bousquet. He began to turn out comedies at a rate of two a year, with his own works, such as For the Love of Mike being adapted by Clifford Grey and Sonny Miller into a musical.

=== Film career ===
Maltby's film career began with the silent Profit and the Loss in 1917. He also wrote and appeared in many films after 1933, including Powell and Pressburger's 1944 A Canterbury Tale and the 1934 Freedom of the Seas. As a character actor of pompous individuals, he appeared in many of the Will Hay and Alfred Hitchcock films of the 1930s for Gainsborough Studios. He is listed in the cast of nearly sixty films, but rarely as the principal player. He is listed as scriptwriter on nearly 50 films, and in the 1930s, he also wrote screenplays for the Tod Slaughter series of melodramas.

In 1950, Maltby published his autobiography, Ring Up the Curtain. He died in Hove, Sussex, England at the age of 82.

== Plays and musicals ==
- The Rotters (1916; 1922)
- Petticoats (1917)
- Maggie (1919)
- A Temporary Gentleman (1919)
- Such a Nice Young Man (1920)
- The Right Age to Marry (1926)
- Dear Old England (1930)
- For the Love of Mike (1931)
- Just My Luck (1933)
- Grand Guignol Horror Plays - Something More Important (1935)
- Jack O'Diamonds (1935)
- Lilac Domino (1953 revision)

== Selected filmography ==
=== Screenwriter ===
- Profit and the Loss (1917)
- The Love Nest (1933)
- Over the Garden Wall (1934)
- Department Store (1935)
- Old Faithful (1935)
- It Happened in Paris (1935)
- The Right Age to Marry (1935)
- Not So Dusty (1936)
- Queen of Hearts (1936)
- Nothing Like Publicity (1936)
- A Touch of the Moon (1936)
- Twice Branded (1936)
- The Howard Case (1936)
- Sweeney Todd: The Demon Barber of Fleet Street (1936)
- Where There's a Will (1936)
- The Crimes of Stephen Hawke (1936)
- Boys Will Be Girls (1937)
- Young and Innocent (1937)
- Why Pick on Me? (1937)
- Farewell to Cinderella (1937)
- It's Never Too Late to Mend (1937)
- The Song of the Road (1937)
- The Ticket of Leave Man (1937)
- Strange Adventures of Mr. Smith (1937)
- Wanted! (1937)
- Pygmalion (1938)
- Darts Are Trumps (1938)
- Weddings Are Wonderful (1938)
- You're the Doctor (1938)
- Miracles Do Happen (1939)
- Blind Folly (1939)
- Crimes at the Dark House (1939)
- Old Mother Riley Joins Up (1939)
- Garrison Follies (1940)
- Front Line Kids (1942)
- Gert and Daisy's Weekend (1942)
- Gert and Daisy Clean Up (1942)
- Something in the City (1950)
- It's a Grand Life (1953)
- Not So Dusty (1956; author of short story)

=== Actor ===
- A Political Party (1934)
- Those Were the Days (1934)
- The Luck of a Sailor (1934)
- Freedom of the Seas (1934)
- Lost in the Legion (1934)
- I Spy (1934)
- Falling in Love (1935)
- Girls Will Be Boys (1934)
- Josser on the Farm (1934)
- Emil and the Detectives (1935)
- The Morals of Marcus (1935)
- A Little Bit of Bluff (1935)
- The Right Age to Marry (1935)
- Vanity (1935)
- King of the Castle (1936)
- Queen of Hearts (1936)
- Fame (1936)
- Jack of All Trades (1936)
- Two's Company (1936)
- Tudor Rose (1936)
- Not So Dusty (1936)
- To Catch a Thief (1936)
- Calling the Tune (1936)
- Everything Is Thunder (1936)
- Where There's a Will (1936)
- The Heirloom Mystery (1936)
- Head Office (1936)
- Everything in Life (1936)
- Reasonable Doubt (1936)
- Wake Up Famous (1937)
- The Song of the Road (1937)
- Busman's Holiday (1936)
- Take My Tip (1937)
- The Live Wire (1937)
- O-Kay for Sound (1937)
- Paradise for Two (1937)
- Sing as You Swing (1937)
- Mr. Smith Carries On (1937)
- Captain's Orders (1937)
- Darts Are Trumps (1938)
- His Lordship Goes to Press (1938)
- The Sky's the Limit (1938)
- Everything Happens to Me (1938)
- What a Man! (1938)
- Return to Yesterday (1940)
- Under Your Hat (1940)
- Garrison Follies (1940)
- Bob's Your Uncle (1942)
- A Canterbury Tale (1944)
- Medal for the General (1944)
- Home, Sweet Home (1945)
- The Trojan Brothers (1946)
- Caesar and Cleopatra (1946)
