= John Seabourne =

British film editor

- Born: 1890; Colchester, Essex, United Kingdom
- Occupation: Editor

John Seabourne was a British film editor active between the 1930s and 1950s. During the early 1930s he edited British Gaumont's newsreels. He is sometimes known as John Seabourne Sr. to distinguish him from his son.

== Filmography ==
- Her First Affaire (1932)
- The Mystery of the Mary Celeste (1935)
- Lend Me Your Husband (1935)
- The Man Without a Face (1935)
- Sweeney Todd (1936)
- The Crimes of Stephen Hawke (1936)
- The House of Silence (1937)
- It's Never Too Late to Mend (1937)
- Double Exposures (1937)
- Under a Cloud (1937)
- Riding High (1937)
- John Halifax (1938)
- Sexton Blake and the Hooded Terror (1938)
- Discoveries (1939)
- Contraband (1940)
- The Life and Death of Colonel Blimp (1943)
- A Canterbury Tale (1944)
- 'I Know Where I'm Going!' (1945)
- The History of Mr. Polly (1949)
- The Rocking Horse Winner (1949)
- The Wooden Horse (1950)
- Night Without Stars (1951)
- Distant Trumpet (1952)
- The Night Won't Talk (1952)
- Sea Devils (1953)
- Our Girl Friday (1953)
- The Green Carnation (1954)
- Track the Man Down (1955)
- Cross Channel (1955)
- Secret Venture (1955)
- A King in New York (1957)
- Dublin Nightmare (1958)
- The Man Who Liked Funerals (1959)
- In the Wake of a Stranger (1959)

== Bibliography ==
- Gene Phillips. Beyond the Epic: The Life and Films of David Lean. University Press of Kentucky, 2006.
