= Sexton Blake and the Hooded Terror =

- Theatrical_release_poster
- Directed by: George King
- Screenplay by: A.R. Rawlinson (screenplay & dialogue)
- Based on: The Mystery of No 13. Caversham Square by Pierre Quiroule
- Produced by: George King
- Starring: George Curzon; Tod Slaughter
- Cinematography: Hone Glendinning
- Edited by: John Seabourne
- Music by: Jack Beaver (as 'music director'); Bretton Byrd (uncredited)
- Production company: George King Productions
- Distributed by: Metro-Goldwyn-Mayer (UK)
- Release date: 1938
- Running time: 70 minutes
- Country: United Kingdom
- Language: English

Sexton Blake and the Hooded Terror is a 1938 British crime film directed by George King and starring George Curzon, Tod Slaughter and Greta Gynt. It was written by A.R. Rawlinson based on '"The Mystery of No 13. Caversham Square'' by Pierre Quiroule. The film, which has been described as the best in the Blake series of 1930s movies, was George Curzon's third and final outing as the fictional detective Sexton Blake.

== Plot summary ==
Sexton Blake attempts defeat a major crime organisation headed by Michael Larron, a 'sort of Moriarty figure'.

== Cast ==
- George Curzon as Sexton Blake
- Tod Slaughter as Michael Larron
- Greta Gynt as Madamoiselle Julie
- Tony Sympson as Tinker
- Charles Oliver as Max Fleming
- Marie Wright as Mrs. Bardell
- David Farrar as Granite Grant
- Norman Pierce as Inspector Bramley
- H.B. Hallam as Monsieur Bertrand
- Bradley Watts as Paul Duvall

== Critical reception ==
The Monthly Film Bulletin wrote: "Tod Slaughter gives a fine performance as the master criminal, and Tony Sympson is an attractive and human assistant to the great detective. Blood and thunder thriller full of improbabilities and impossibilities, and very good fun."

Kine Weekly wrote: "Unsophisticated detective melodrama which makes a strong appeal for juveniles and is entertaining both for its naivete and its conventional transpontine thrills ... Tod Slaughter makes an excellent villain as Larren, but one feels he has not been given quite enough to do. George Curzon is well cast as the detective, and Greta Gynt is attractive as the heroine. ... One feels that the story has hardly been played in a sufficiently full-blooded, melodramatic manner. It is of a type that demands over- rather than under-statement, for its thrills are often apt to be as amusing as its intentional moments of comedy."

Of the film's villain, Leonard Maltin wrote: "Slaughter plays it basically straight in this passable low-budget outing."

Dennis Schwartz wrote: "Tod Slaughter is a trip as the perverse villain drooling over both stamps and Julie (Greta Gynt), and decked out when meeting gang members in a spiffy black robe with a snake embroidered on its front and a fashionable KKK-like hood. Like Vincent Price, Slaughter can make a not too original low-budget B film fun to watch."
