= Too Many Crooks (disambiguation) =

Too Many Crooks is a 1959 British comedy film directed by Mario Zampi.

Too Many Crooks may also refer to:

== Films ==
- Too Many Crooks (1919 film), a 1919 American silent comedy film directed by Ralph Ince
- Too Many Crooks (1927 film), a 1927 American silent comedy film directed by Fred C. Newmeyer
- Too Many Crooks (1930 film), a 1930 British comedy crime film directed by George King

== Television ==
- "Too Many Crooks", a 1953 episode of I Love Lucy
- "Too Many Crooks" (Minder), an episode of the ITV television series Minder
- "Too Many Cooks" (short), a 2014 surreal dark comedy short aired as an Adult Swim special
