= It's Never Too Late to Mend =

1937 film by David MacDonald

- Opening titles
- Directed by: David MacDonald
- Written by: H. F. Maltby
- Based on: It Is Never Too Late to Mend; 1856 novel by Charles Reade
- Produced by: George King
- Starring: Tod Slaughter; Jack Livesey; Marjorie Taylor
- Cinematography: Hone Glendinning
- Edited by: John Seabourne Sr.
- Music by: Jack Beaver
- Production company: George King Productions
- Distributed by: Metro-Goldwyn-Mayer
- Release date: March 1937
- Running time: 70 minutes
- Country: United Kingdom
- Language: English

It's Never Too Late to Mend (also known as Never Too Late to Mend; U.S. title: Never Too Late) is a 1937 British melodrama film directed by David MacDonald and starring Tod Slaughter, Jack Livesey and Marjorie Taylor. It was written by H.F. Maltby based on the 1856 novel It Is Never Too Late to Mend by Charles Reade. The film was produced at Shepperton Studios as a quota quickie for release by Metro-Goldwyn-Mayer. It was re-released in 1942.

The novel was previously adapted as a 1922 British silent film starring Russell Thorndike as Squire Meadows.

== Plot ==
The villainous Squire Meadows plans to marry Susan Merton, despite the attention paid to her by his rival George Fielding. With his evil plan to have his Fielding arrested on trumped-up charges, the Squire is on the point of winning Susan. Then he is foiled.

== Cast ==
- Tod Slaughter as Squire Meadows
- Jack Livesey as Tom Robinson
- Marjorie Taylor as Susan Merton
- Ian Colin as George Fielding
- Laurence Hanray as Lawyer Crawley
- D. J. Williams as Farmer Merton
- Roy Russell as Rev. Mr. Eden
- John Singer as Josephs
- Leonard Sharp as Bradshaw (uncredited)
- Mavis Villiers as Betty (uncredited)
- Cecil Bevan as prison inspector (uncredited)
- Douglas Stewart as prison inspector (uncredited)
- Jack Vyvian as innkeeper (uncredited)

== Reception ==
Kine Weekly wrote: "Fruity old-time melodrama adapted in the grand manner from Charles Reade's famous novel. Originally an indictment of the inhuman nineteenth-century English prison system, the story no longer carries any propaganda value, but it does allow Tod Slaughter to add yet another highly coloured portrait of villainy to his already long gallery. ... This picture is more than just a museum piece; it is hearty melodrama with a punch and a laugh that no modern entertainment can give. Much that is meant to be serious is amusing, but nothing can disturb the meaty texture of the colourful histrionics. It scores on its unabashed villainies and the swashbuckling of Tod Slaughter."

The Daily Film Renter wrote: "Tod Slaughter acts Meadows with superb gusto, twirling his mustachios and chuckling with unholy glee, and registering spine-chilling ries at the climax. His brutal supervision of convicts (as a visiting magistrate) is sadism run riot, and his doping of the hero's wine a masterly study in transpontine art. Johnny Singer chalks up a hit as a little convict who dies as a result of his inhumanities. Others in the cast enter into the spirit of the thing with relish. Settings are admirable for story demands, and direction exceptionally deft, in that the comic business and the poignant issues are so interwoven as not to appear incongruous."

Picturegoer wrote: "Tod Slaughter puts over this old time melodrama, in which the serious moments are often as amusing as the intended comedy incidents, with a heartiness that recalls the days when audiences rose and hissed the villain. It is primarily an indictment of the inhuman prison system of the nineteenth century, but as it now stands it is an unconscious burlesque. All the supporting artistes play in the approved melodramatic traditions."

TV Guide wrote: "Great fun in the old cloak-and-dagger melodrama style...Played in an exaggerated, bigger-than-life manner, this melodrama is a good enough outing, particularly for fans of camp."

Sky Movies wrote: "As usual, Tod Slaughter ignores the intimacy of the film medium and roars through this movie at full throttle, giving the kind of marvellously storming performance that would easily have reached the back row of the upper circle...David MacDonald is more a referee than a conventional director, coming up with a highly entertaining slice of ripe and fruity hokum."
