= Eric Portman =

English actor (1901–1969)

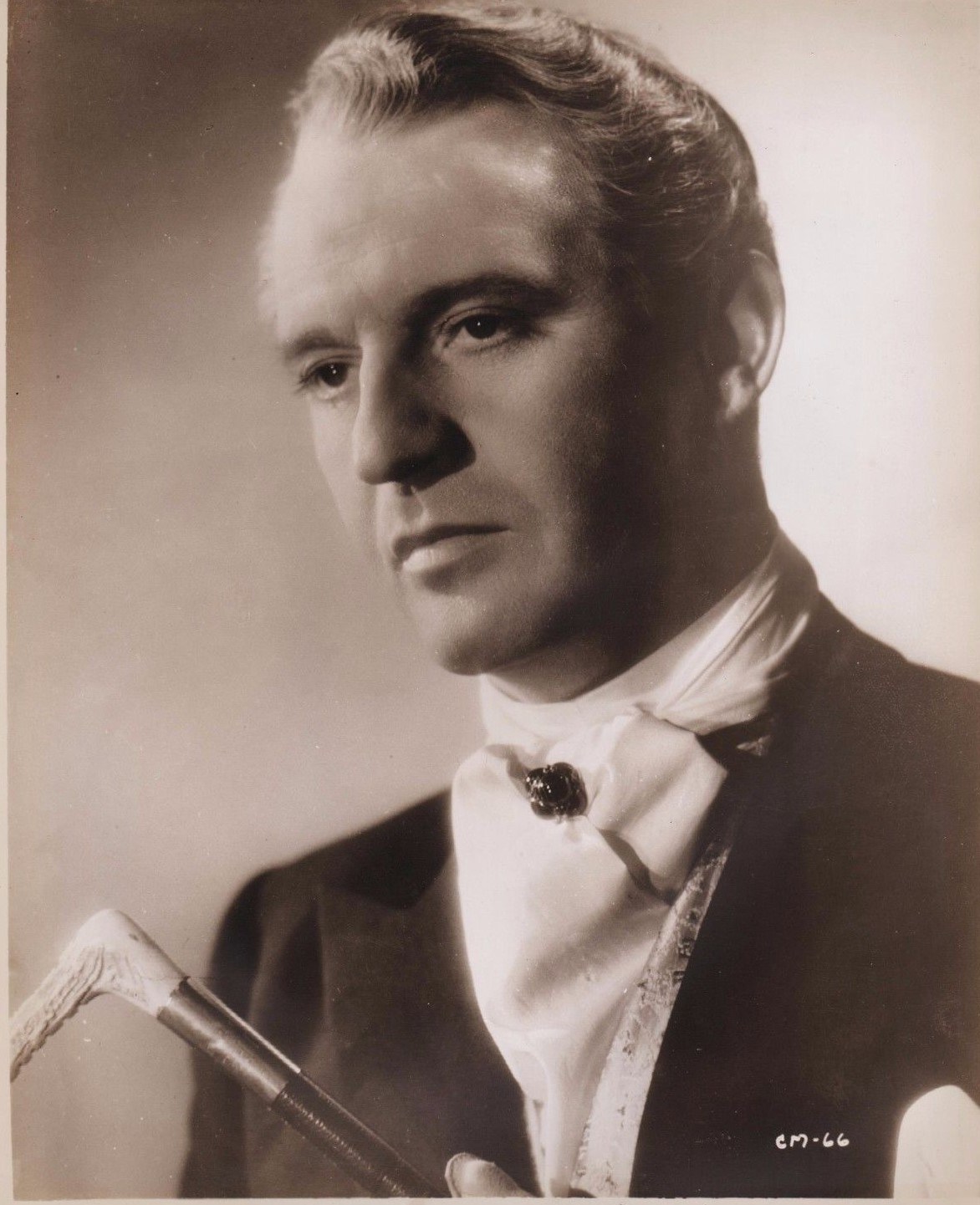
- Portman in 1948
- Born: Eric Harold Portman; 13 July 1901; Halifax, West Riding of Yorkshire, England
- Died: 7 December 1969 (aged 68); St Veep, Cornwall, England
- Occupation: Actor
- Years active: 1924–1969

Eric Harrison Portman (born Eric Harold Portman; 13 July 1901 – 7 December 1969) was an English stage and screen actor. He is probably best remembered for his roles in three films for Powell and Pressburger during the 1940s. He was nominated for a Tony Award for Best Actor in a Play for his performance in Separate Tables.

BFI Screenonline described him as "an unlikely box-office attraction in the 1940s, when audiences admired his polished, distinctive voice and portrayals of disturbed, complex characters."

== Early life ==
Born in Halifax, in the West Riding of Yorkshire, Portman was the second son of Matthew Portman (1868–1939), a wool merchant, and his wife, Alice, née Harrison (1870–1918). His birth was registered with the middle name of Harold but he would later adopt his mother's maiden name as his middle name.

== Education ==
He was educated at Rishworth School in Yorkshire and, in 1922, started work as a salesman in the menswear department at the Marshall & Snelgrove department store in Leeds and acted in the amateur Halifax Light Opera Society.

== Career ==
He made his professional stage debut in 1924 with Henry Baynton's company. In 1924, Robert Courtneidge's Shakespearian company arrived in Halifax. Portman joined the company as a 'passenger' and appeared in their production of Richard II at the Victoria Hall, Sunderland which led to Courtneidge giving him a contract. Portman made his West End debut at the Savoy Theatre in London, in September 1924, as Antipholous of Syracuse in The Comedy of Errors. He was engaged by Lilian Baylis for the Old Vic Company. In 1928, Portman played Romeo at the rebuilt Old Vic. He became a successful theatre actor. In 1933, Portman was in Diplomacy at the Prince's Theatre with Gerald du Maurier and Basil Rathbone.

In the 1930s, he began appearing in films, starting with an uncredited bit in The Girl from Maxim's (1933) directed by Alexander Korda. In 1935, he appeared in four films, including Maria Marten, or The Murder in the Red Barn with Tod Slaughter. He also made Hyde Park Corner with Gordon Harker and directed by Sinclair Hill; Old Roses and Abdul the Damned.

In 1936 Portman had a stage hit playing Lord Byron in Bitter Harvest. After Hearts of Humanity (1936), he played Giuliano de' Medici in Hill's The Cardinal (1936). Portman made another film with Tod Slaughter, The Crimes of Stephen Hawke (1936), and was in Moonlight Sonata (1937).

He went to the US and played in Madame Bovary on Broadway for the Theatre Guild of America. He also had a small role in The Prince and the Pauper (1937), but disliked Hollywood and did not stay long.

He was back on Broadway in I Have Been Here Before by J. B. Priestley. Portman's last London stage show was Jeannie.

In the semi-autobiographical play Dinner with Ribbentrop by screenwriter Norman Hudis, a former personal assistant to Portman, Hudis relates a claim made often by Portman that in 1937, before the start of the Second World War, he had had dinner in London with Joachim von Ribbentrop (then the German Ambassador to Britain). Portman claimed that Ribbentrop had told him that "when Germany wins the war, Portman would be installed as the greatest English star in the New Europe" at a purpose-built film studio in Berlin.

In 1941 he had his first important film role playing Lieutenant Hirth, a Nazi on the run, in Powell and Pressburger's 49th Parallel, which was a big hit in the US and Britain. Portman was established as a star and signed a long-term contract with Gainsborough Pictures.

Portman was in Powell and Pressburger's follow up, One of Our Aircraft Is Missing (1942), which reworked the story of The 49th Parallel to be about Allied pilots in occupied Holland. He played a Belgian resistance leader in Uncensored (1942) from director Anthony Asquith, and a German pilot in Squadron Leader X (1943) with director Lance Comfort. Portman was a sailor in Asquith's We Dive at Dawn (1943) and a factory supervisor in Millions Like Us (1943) from Launder and Gilliat. He was in another war story in Comfort's Escape to Danger (1943), then was back with Powell and Pressburger for A Canterbury Tale (1944). Portman had the lead in Great Day (1945) with Flora Robson and in the expensive colonial epic Men of Two Worlds (1946).

In 1945, exhibitors voted him the 10th most popular star at the British box office. He maintained that ranking the following year.

He made some thrillers – Wanted for Murder (1947), Dear Murderer (1947) and The Mark of Cain (1947). He was a hangman in Daybreak (1948), then made Corridor of Mirrors (1948) and The Blind Goddess (1948). He made two films for the new producing team of Maxwell Setton and Aubrey Baring, The Spider and the Fly (1949) and Cairo Road (1950). Portman was one of many names in The Magic Box (1951) and then made an Ealing comedy, His Excellency (1952), playing a trade unionist who becomes Governor of a British colony. For Baring and Setton, he made South of Algiers (1953) then had a big hit on stage in Terence Rattigan's Separate Tables and on film in The Colditz Story (1955). Portman had a supporting part in The Deep Blue Sea (1955) and Child in the House (1956). He had the lead in The Good Companions (1957).

He played the bogus Major in Terence Rattigan's play Separate Tables in 1956–57 on Broadway. For this performance, he was nominated for a Tony Award (Best Actor (Dramatic)). In 1958 he appeared on Broadway in a short-lived production of Jane Eyre as Rochester. Portman had better luck the following year in a production of Eugene O'Neill's A Touch of the Poet, which had a long run. In contrast, Flowering Cherry by Robert Bolt, with Portman in the title role, only lasted five performances on Broadway.

Later film roles included in The Naked Edge (1961), Freud: The Secret Passion (1962), West 11 (1963), The Man Who Finally Died (1963), The Bedford Incident (1965), and The Spy with a Cold Nose (1966).

In 1962 Portman was in a stage adaptation of A Passage to India that ran for 109 performances on Broadway.

Near the end of his life he played character roles including Number Two in the TV series The Prisoner, appearing in the episode "Free For All" (1967), as well as films including The Whisperers (1967) and Deadfall (1968), both for director Bryan Forbes. His final film was Assignment to Kill (1968).

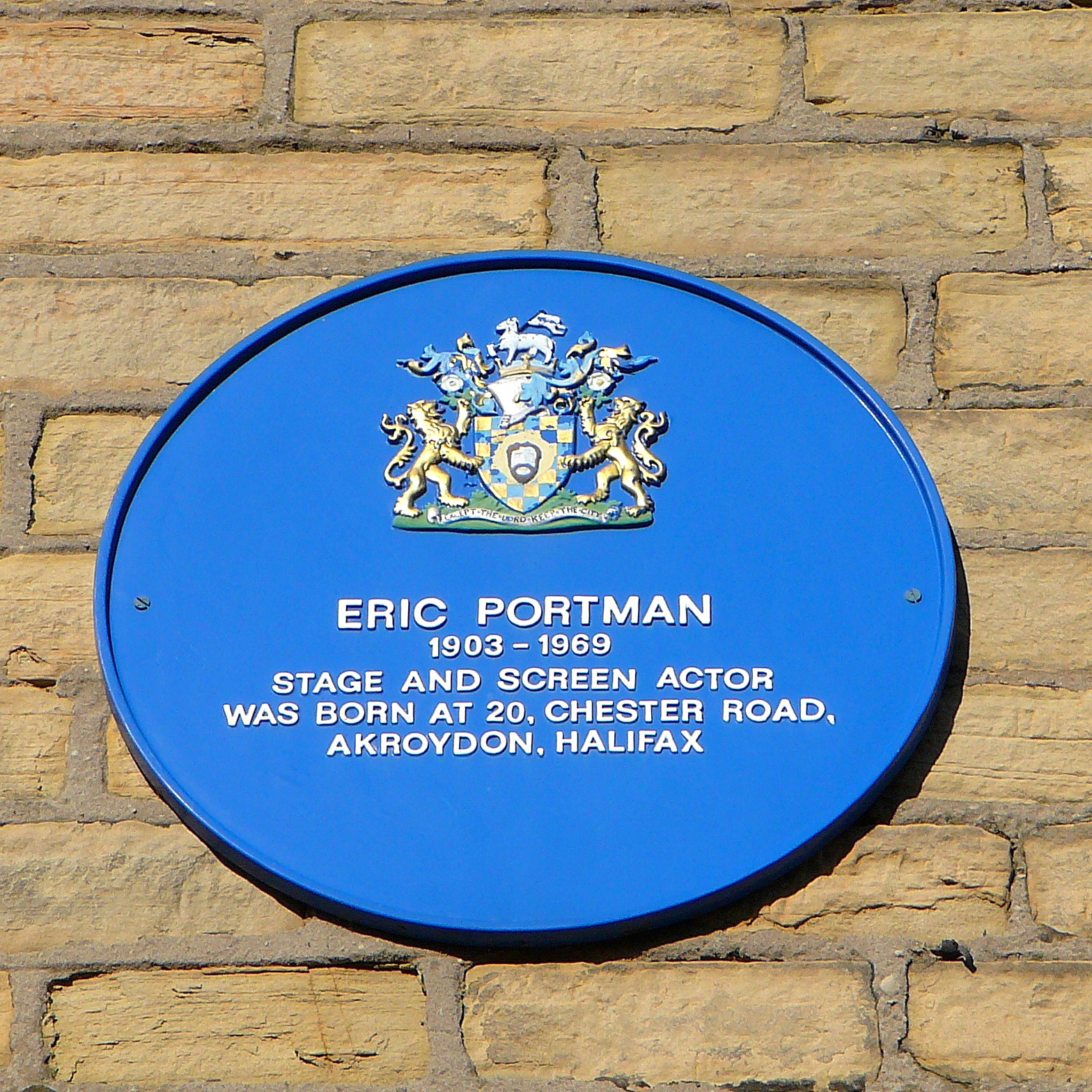
Blue Plaque dedicated to Eric Portman.

== Personal life ==
In the early 1920s Portman was an amateur in Halifax Light Opera. While there he was romantically involved with Eliza Jane Thornton, his leading lady. After appearing in The Silver Box together, they both went to London to work professionally, though eventually Thornton returned to Halifax. Decades after Portman's death in 1969, it emerged that he was gay and that assistant director Knox Laing (1913–1974) was his partner.

== Death ==
Portman died at age 68 at his home in St Veep, Cornwall on 7 December 1969 from heart disease. He was buried in St. Veep parish church.

== Honours ==
A blue plaque was erected by the Halifax Civic Trust.

== Complete filmography ==
- The Girl from Maxim's (1933) (uncredited)
- Old Roses (1935) as Lou
- Abdul the Damned (1935) as Young Turk Conspirator
- Hyde Park Corner (1935) as Edward Chester
- Maria Marten, or The Murder in the Red Barn (1935) as Carlos
- The Cardinal (1936) as Giuliano de' Medici
- The Crimes of Stephen Hawke (1936) as Matthew Trimble
- Hearts of Humanity (1936) as Jack Clinton
- Moonlight Sonata (1937) as Mario de la Costa
- The Prince and the Pauper (1937) as First Lord
- The Singing Marine (1937) as Derelict firing gun in stage show (uncredited)
- The Constant Nymph (1938 TV film) (uncredited)
- A Hundred Years Old (1938 TV film) as Trino
- The Rivals (1938 TV film) as Captain Absolute
- The Gamblers (1939 TV film) as Iharyof
- She Stoops to Conquer (1939 TV film) as Young Marlow
- A Night at the Hardcastles (1939 TV film) as Young Marlow
- The Pelican (1939 TV film) as Charles Cheriton
- 49th Parallel (1941) as Lieutenant Hirth, U-Boat Crew
- One of Our Aircraft Is Missing (1942) as Tom Earnshaw
- Uncensored (1942) as Andre Delange
- Squadron Leader X (1943) as Erich Kohler
- We Dive at Dawn (1943) as S. Hobson
- Millions Like Us (1943) as Charlie Forbes
- Escape to Danger (1943) as Arthur Lawrence
- A Canterbury Tale (1944) as Thomas Colpeper, JP
- Great Day (1945) as Captain John Ellis
- Wanted for Murder (1946) as Victor James Colebrooke, aka Tom Maren
- Men of Two Worlds (1946) as District Commissioner Randall
- Dear Murderer (1947) as Lee Warren
- The Mark of Cain (1947) as Richard Howard
- Corridor of Mirrors (1948) as Paul Mangin
- Daybreak (1948) as Eddie
- The Blind Goddess (1948) as Sir John Dearing, KC
- The Spider and the Fly (1949) as Fernand Maubert
- Cairo Road (1950) as Youssef Bey
- The Magic Box (1951) as Arthur Collings
- His Excellency (1952) as George Harrison
- South of Algiers (a.k.a. The Golden Mask, 1953)
- The Colditz Story (1955)
- The Last Reunion (1955) as Simmie
- The Deep Blue Sea (1955)
- Child in the House (1956)
- The Good Companions (1957)
- Alfred Hitchcock Presents (1960) (Season 5 Episode 29: "The Hero") as Sir Richard Musgrave
- The Naked Edge (1961) as Jeremy Clay
- Freud: The Secret Passion (1962) as Dr. Theodore Meynert
- August for the People (1963 TV film) as Sir Augustus Thwaites
- West 11 (1963) as Richard Dyce
- The Man Who Finally Died (1963) as Inspector Hofmeister
- The Bedford Incident (1965) as Commodore Wolfgang Schrepke
- The Spy with a Cold Nose (1966) as British Ambassador
- The Whisperers (1967) as Archie Ross
- ITV Play of the Week (1967) (Series 12 Episode 23: "The Crossfire") as Dr. David Sorel
- The Prisoner (1967) Number Two
- Assignment to Kill (1968) as Notary
- Deadfall (1968) as Moreau

== Bibliography ==
- Owens, Andy. Our Eric: A Portrait of Eric Portman. England, Sigma Press, October 2013. ISBN 1-850-5898-1-X
