= Reasonable Doubt (1936 film) =

- Trade advertisement from The Daily Film Renter (2 December 1936)
- Directed by: George King
- Written by: Ewart Brookes
- Produced by: Gabriel Pascal
- Starring: John Stuart; Nancy Burne
- Cinematography: Ronald Neame
- Production company: Gabriel Pascal Productions
- Distributed by: Metro-Goldwyn-Mayer
- Release date: 1936
- Running time: 73 minutes
- Country: United Kingdom
- Language: English

Reasonable Doubt is a 1936 British comedy film directed by George King starring John Stuart and Nancy Burne. It was written by Ewart Brookes, and produced by Gabriel Pascal at Shepperton Studios as a quota quickie.

== Preservation status ==
The British Film Institute National Archive holds no stills or ephemera, and no film or video materials.

== Plot ==
Noel Hampton, an eminent King's Counsel, whose wife vanished during the war, falls in love with a society girl named Pat and hopes to marry her, but his plans are derailed when she meets Tony, a struggling playwright. As Pat's interest in Tony grows, Noel realises his chances with her are now over. When Tony is arrested on a murder charge, backed by damning circumstantial evidence, Pat begs Noel to take on Tony's legal defence. Noel agrees, only to make the shocking discovery that Tony is actually his own long-lost son. The pieces of the past begin to fall into place, revealing that Noel's wife had suffered a severe accident before Tony's birth, which left the young man profoundly neurasthenic. By presenting this tragic, real-life family history as his defence, Noel secures Tony's acquittal. After the trial, Pat reveals is actually Noel, not Tony, whom she truly loves.

== Cast ==
- John Stuart as Noel Hampton
- Nancy Burne as Pat
- Marjorie Taylor
- Ivan Brandt as Tony
- Marie Lohr
- Clifford Heatherley as landlord
- H. F. Maltby
- Cecil Humphreys
- Fred Duprez
- Cynthia Stock

== Reception ==
The Monthly Film Bulletin wrote: "John Stuart makes a convincing K.C. ... There are some good moments but interest is too much divided between the K.C.'s first and second love stories. Clifford Heatherley is excellent as a landlord and Ivan Brandt cleverly suggests a young man whose balance is all too easily upset."

Kine Weekly wrote: "Too reliant on the long arm of coincidence to promote other than second-rate entertainment. The story covers plenty of ground, but so clumsy is the spinning of the many threads that by the time it culminates in the big court scene the verdict is too obvious to present the climax with an emotional kick."
