= Darts Are Trumps =

1938 British film by Maclean Rogers

- Directed by: Maclean Rogers
- Written by: Gordon Bushell; Kathleen Butler; H. F. Maltby
- Produced by: A. George Smith
- Starring: Eliot Makeham; Nancy O'Neil; Ian Colin
- Cinematography: Geoffrey Faithfull
- Production company: George Smith Productions
- Distributed by: RKO Pictures
- Release date: March 1938
- Running time: 72 minutes
- Country: United Kingdom
- Language: English

Darts Are Trumps is a 1938 British comedy film directed by Maclean Rogers and starring Eliot Makeham, Nancy O'Neil and Ian Colin. It was written by Gordon Bushell, Kathleen Butler and H. F. Maltby and was made at Walton Studios as a quota quickie for release by RKO Pictures.

== Preservation status ==
The British Film Institute National Archive holds a collection of stills but no film or video materials.

== Plot ==
Harsh diamond merchant Stephen Sims snubs his loyal clerk, Joe Stone, by instead going into partnership with Bernard Joyce, a ne'er-do-well aristocrat. To settle a debt with a man named Craddock, Joyce obtains some jewels from his uncle, Lord Melchester, for Sims to negotiate with Craddock. However, at their meeting, Craddock knocks Sims unconscious and grabs the jewels. Stone arrives just as Craddock is escaping and uses his skills as a champion darts player to pin Craddock to the wall with three perfectly thrown darts. Sims rewards Stone with the partnership he deserves.

== Cast ==
- Eliot Makeham as Joe Stone
- Nancy O'Neil as Mary Drake
- Ian Colin as Harry
- Muriel George as Mrs. Drake
- H. F. Maltby as Stephen Sims
- Paul Blake as Hon. Bernard Joyce
- John Singer as Jimmy

== Reception ==
The Monthly Film Bulletin wrote: "The film is delightfully acted, the characters being well differentiated, and the darts theme forms an original and amusing background. Eliot Makeham as the darts expert clerk is especially convincing, and H. F. Maltby as Sims and John Singer as Jimmy are highly competent. The production and photography are successful and the result is very good healthy entertainment."

The Daily Film Renter wrote: "There are some telling human touches, while romance is well in evidence, and there is no lack of drama when occasion demands. Eliot Makeham is in his element as the boss-ridden hero, and H. F. Maltby is immense as his peppery employer. Muriel George is benevolence personified as a kindly suburban matron."

Kine Weekly wrote: "There is no pretence about this picture, it is honest-to-goodness entertainment, made from a pattern that should move to tears amd laughter all classes. The idea of making 'darts' the kernel of the plot adds an additional homely touch and also accounts for culminating thrills while other attributes are life-like character drawing and crisp natural dialogue. The atmosphere, too, is realistic."

Picturegoer wrote: "It is homely stuff with sound human appeal of an unpretentioud order."

Picture Show wrote: "Pleasant, unpretentious and refreshing, this comedy drama is thoroughly English, and gives a vivid picture of typical suburban life. ... Eliot Makeham gives a splendid portrayal of the retiring little clerk, and invests it with charm and quiet humour. H. F. Maltby makes a splendid foil as the overbearing Sims, the diamond broker, and the rest of the cast is good."
