= Robert Adair (actor) =

British actor (1900–1954)

- Born: 3 January 1900; San Francisco, California, U.S.
- Died: 10 August 1954 (aged 54); London, England
- Other names: Robert A'Dair
- Occupation: Actor

Robert Adair (3 January 1900 – 10 August 1954) was an American-born British actor. He was born in San Francisco. He was also known as Robert A'Dair, the name by which he was billed in Journey's End (1930).

Adair died of leukemia in London.

== Selected filmography ==
- Journey's End (1930)
- The Dover Road (1934)
- The Girl Who Came Back (1935)
- London by Night (1937)
- The Ticket of Leave Man (1937)
- What a Man! (1938)
- The Face at the Window (1939)
- It's Hard to Be Good (1948)
- Portrait of Clare (1950)
- There Is Another Sun (1951)
- There Was a Young Lady (1953)
- Park Plaza 605 (1953)
- Eight O'Clock Walk (1954)
