= Number, Please (film) =

1931 film

- Warwick Ward and Mabel Poulton in the film.
- Directed by: George King
- Written by: Charles Bennett; Billie Bristow; H. Fowler Mear
- Produced by: Harry Cohen
- Starring: Mabel Poulton; Warwick Ward; Richard Bird
- Production company: George King Productions
- Distributed by: Fox Film Company
- Release date: 1 July 1931
- Running time: 41 minutes
- Country: United Kingdom
- Language: English

Number, Please is a 1931 British crime film directed by George King and starring Mabel Poulton, Warwick Ward and Richard Bird. It was written by Charles Bennett, Billie Bristow and H. Fowler Mear, and was a quota quickie made at the Nettlefold Studios in Walton-upon-Thames.

== Preservation status ==
The British Film Institute National Archive holds a collection of ephemera and stills but no film or video materials.

== Plot ==
Peggy is a telephone operator in a London hotel. After a falling-out with her boyfriend Jimmy, she unwidely accepts a dinner invitation from Curtis Somers, one of the hotel's guests. Jimmy suspects that Curtis is a cad, and follows them. After dining, Curtis takes Peggy back to his apartment, but Jimmy saves her from his unwelcome advances. Later, Curtis kills Jimmy's boss, and frames Jimmy for the crime. The office telephone, however, is knocked over during the murder, and Peggy hears enough to invalidate Curtis's alibi, and to get Jimmy off the hook.

== Cast ==
- Mabel Poulton as Peggy
- Warwick Ward as Curtis Somers
- Richard Bird as Jimmy
- Frank Perfitt as McAllister
- Iris Darbyshire as vamp
- Gladys Hamer as Darkie
- Norman Pierce as Inspector
- Quentin McPhearson
- Anita Sharp-Bolster

== Reception ==
Film Weekly wrote: "The trials of a telephone operator in a big hotel are recounted to you in this unambitious but fairly entertaining British talkie. ... Mabel Poulton gives a lively and efficient performance as Peggy, and Warwick Ward exhibits his usual suave villainy in a film which has entertaining elements, even though it is not entirely satisfactory."

Kine Weekly wrote: "The story of this crook playlet is really quite ingenious, but the slow tempo in which it is played rather robs it of full dramatic effect. However, it is quite diverting and should make an acceptable: second feature. ... Although the story has some claims to originality and ingenuity, George King, the director, has hardly succeeded in escaping from the obvious. Some of the scenes are badly timed, particularly the fight at the finish, and the result is a little laughter, instead of the expected thrill."
