= Tomorrow We Live (1943 film) =

- Original UK poster
- Directed by: George King
- Screenplay by: Anatole de Grunwald
- Story by: Dorothy Hope
- Produced by: S.W. Smith
- Starring: John Clements; Godfrey Tearle; Greta Gynt; Hugh Sinclair; Yvonne Arnaud
- Cinematography: Otto Heller
- Music by: Nicholas Brodzsky
- Production company: British Aviation Pictures
- Distributed by: British Lion Film
- Release date: 5 April 1943
- Running time: 87 minutes
- Country: United Kingdom
- Languages: English, French, German

Tomorrow We Live (U.S. title: At Dawn We Die) is a 1943 British film directed by George King and starring John Clements, Godfrey Tearle, Greta Gynt, Hugh Sinclair and Yvonne Arnaud. It was written by Anatole de Grunwald from a story by Dorothy Hope.

The action is set in a small town in German-occupied France. It portrays the activities of members of the French Resistance and the Germans' tactic of taking and shooting innocent hostages in reprisal for acts of sabotage. The opening credits acknowledge "the official co-operation of General de Gaulle and the French National Committee."

== Plot ==
A young French idealist, who gives his name as Jean Baptiste, arrives in "St Pierre-le-Port", a small town near Saint-Nazaire, a major port and base of operations for the Kriegsmarine, particularly their U-boats, on the Atlantic coast. Baptiste tells a member of the French Resistance that "I come from Saint-Nazaire. I've details of the submarine base, the docks and power plant. If I can get them to England..."

The first half of the film often has a lighthearted tone; the Germans are portrayed as bumbling and easily outwitted. The German commandant is overweight and gullible. However, after the Resistance successfully sabotages a German armaments train, the SS take charge of the town, and the occupation takes a brutal turn.

== Cast ==
- John Clements as Jean Baptiste
- Godfrey Tearle as Mayor Pierre DuSchen
- Hugh Sinclair as Major von Kleist
- Greta Gynt as Marie DuSchen
- Judy Kelly as Germaine Bertan
- Yvonne Arnaud as Madame L. Labouche
- Karel Stepanek as Seitz
- Bransby Williams as Matthieu
- Fritz Wendhausen as Commandant Frissette
- Allan Jeayes as Pogo
- Gabrielle Brune as Madame Frissette
- Margaret Yarde as Fauntel
- David Keir as Jacquier
- Anthony Holles as Stationmaster
- Olaf Olsen as Sergeant Major
- D.J. Williams as Boileau
- John Salew as Marcel La Blanc
- Walter Gotell as Hans
- Victor Beaumont as Rabineau
- Brefni O'Rorke as Moreau
- Gibb McLaughlin as Dupont
- Cot D'Ordan as Durand
- Walter Hertner as Schultz
- Herbert Lom as Kurtz
- Townsend Whitling as Rougemont

== Music ==
Nicholas Brodzsky is credited for the music, while the orchestration is credited to Roy Douglas, an English composer who was much in demand as an arranger, orchestrator, and copyist of the music of others, notably Richard Addinsell, Ralph Vaughan Williams and William Walton. However it is possible that Brodzsky actually contributed very little. In a memoir in the William Walton Archive, Roy Douglas claimed, "Brodsky was a so-called composer: I had actually composed entire film scores for him, which went under his name." In a letter to Roy Douglas dated 23 December 1943, William Walton wrote, "I'm delighted about your picture. I'll have a good deal to tell you about Brodsky when I see you. In my capacity as music adviser to Two Cities [a film company] it is going to be my duty to have to tick him off!"
