= Ruby Miller (actress) =

British actress (1889–1976)

- Photographed by Bassano Ltd. (1921)
- Born: 14 July 1889; London, England
- Died: 2 April 1976 (aged 86); Chichester, Sussex, England
- Other name: Ruby Laura Rose Miller
- Occupation: Actress
- Years active: 1916–1948 (film)

Ruby Miller (14 July 1889 – 2 April 1976) was a British stage and film actress. Originally one of George Edwardes' ‘Gaiety Girls’, she was the subject of TV's This is Your Life in 1962. In June 1966 she appeared in the final ABC production of the popular series Thank Your Lucky Stars with a rendition of the song "Stop and Think".

== Selected filmography ==
- Little Women (1917)
- Edge O' Beyond (1919)
- The Mystery of Mr. Bernard Brown (1921)
- The Mystery Road (1921)
- Alimony (1924)
- The Infamous Lady (1928)
- Sorrell and Son (1933)
- The Dictator (1935)
- Gay Old Dog (1935)
- The Right Age to Marry (1935)
- Nothing Like Publicity (1936)
- Double Exposures (1937)
- Shadowed Eyes (1940)
- Law and Disorder (1940)
- Facing the Music (1941)
- The Hundred Pound Window (1944)
- Twilight Hour (1945)
- Anna Karenina (1948)

== Bibliography ==
- Warren, Patricia. British Film Studios: An Illustrated History. Batsford, 2001.
