= Crimes at the Dark House =

1940 British film by George King

- Directed by: George King
- Written by: Edward Dryhurst; Frederick Hayward; H. F. Maltby
- Based on: The Woman in White by Wilkie Collins
- Produced by: George King; Odette King
- Starring: Tod Slaughter
- Cinematography: Hone Glendinning
- Edited by: Jack Harris
- Music by: Jack Beaver
- Release date: 1940
- Running time: 69 minutes
- Country: UK
- Language: English

Crimes at the Dark House (originally titled The Woman in White) is a 1940 British film directed by George King and starring Tod Slaughter, Sylvia Marriott and Hilary Eaves. It was written by Edward Dryhurst, Frederick Hayward and H.F. Maltby based on the 1860 novel The Woman in White by Wilkie Collins.

== Plot ==
A villain murders the wealthy Sir Percival Glyde in the gold fields of Australia (by hammering a tent peg into his ear as he sleeps) and assumes his identity in order to inherit his estate in England. On arriving in England, he schemes to marry an heiress for her money. With the connivance of the enigmatic Dr. Fosco, he embarks on a killing spree targeting those who suspect him to be an imposter and who may prevent him from becoming the lord of the manor.

== Cast ==
- Tod Slaughter as the false Percival Glyde
- Sylvia Marriott as Laurie Fairlie / Anne Catherick
- Hilary Eaves as Marion Fairlie
- Geoffrey Wardwell as Paul Hartwright
- Hay Petrie as Dr. Isidor Fosco
- Margaret Yarde as Mrs. Bullen
- Rita Grant as Jessica, the maid
- David Horne as Frederick Fairlie
- Elsie Wagstaff as Mrs. Catherick
- David Keir as lawyer Merriman

== Reception ==
The Monthly Film Bulletin wrote: "Cast and direction have co-operated admirably in putting over this marvellous story in exactly the right manner. Never were villains more sinister nor heroines more pure, while right is triumphant and wrongdoing punished to the satisfaction of all. Tod Slaughter has a part after his own heart, and he enters into it with immense gusto. His flamboyant and bombastic portrait of the wicked man is delightful, and he is helped by effective dialogue and clever support from Hay Petrie, whose Dr. Fosco is almost equally impressive. The period settings are admirable and help greatly in the creation of the right atmosphere. Those who enjoy this type of melodrama will find it one of the best examples of its kind which has yet been produced."

Kine Weekly wrote: "Wilkie Collins' crime classic is not taken too seriously, but seriously enough to give good background and opportunity to Tod Slaughter's flambovant and effectively sinister histrionics. ... Authentic trimmmings are of course essential, and these are to be found in the accuracy of the period settings and the richness of the dialogue."
