= Sweeney Todd: The Demon Barber of Fleet Street (1936 film) =

- American release poster
- Directed by: George King
- Written by: Frederick Hayward; H. F. Maltby
- Based on: The String of Pearls; 1847 play by George Dibdin-Pitt
- Produced by: George King
- Starring: Tod Slaughter; Stella Rho; John Singer; Eve Lister; Bruce Seton
- Cinematography: Jack Parker
- Edited by: John Seabourne
- Music by: Eric Ansell
- Production company: George King Productions
- Distributed by: Metro-Goldwyn-Mayer
- Release date: March 1936
- Running time: 68 minutes
- Country: United Kingdom
- Language: English

Sweeney Todd: The Demon Barber of Fleet Street is a 1936 British drama film produced and directed by George King, and written by Frederick Hayward, H. F. Maltby, and George Dibdin-Pitt. The film features actor Tod Slaughter as the barber Sweeney Todd.

== Plot ==
The film starts in 1936 as a barber tells a patron the story of the infamous Sweeney Todd. In 1836, Sweeney Todd is a barber with a shop near the docks of London. One day, as the mercantile ship The Golden Hope readies to leave, Todd watches Johanna Oakley and Mark Ingerstreet. They are in love, but Mark is shipping out and laments that he is a poor man unable to win the approval of Johanna's father, Governor Oakley. Nearby, Johanna's servant Nan asks Mark's fellow sailor Pearley to buy her various luxury goods while he's away. Pearley points out he hasn't the money to buy them. Simultaneously, Todd watches all his potential customers and thinks of the money he can make.

Back at the barbershop, Todd has been sent a new apprentice: the orphan Tobias Ragg. Next door is a meat pie shop run by Mrs. Lovatt. She has a large cellar that connects to Todd's. In addition to being a barber, Todd buys a share of Oakley's shipping company and hopes to marry Johanna. Using his charm, Todd lures wealthy, respectable customers from the docks into his barbershop at Fleet Street, where he sits them in a "special" barber's chair. Before shaving a man, he always sends Tobias to Mrs. Lovatt's for a meat pie. When Todd pulls a lever, the chair flips over and dumps the unsuspecting victim head-first into the basement. Mrs. Lovatt then disposes of the bodies for a share of the stolen money. She is, however, increasingly annoyed with Todd for robbing the bodies preemptively and taking more than his share of the money.

The Golden Hope returns to London, with Mark a newly wealthy man. Todd lures him into his barbershop. Mark foolishly talks about his love for Johanna and shows off his new riches. Todd sends Mark down the chute but Mrs. Lovatt quickly hides him in a cupboard. When Todd comes down, he is surprised to see that the body is gone. However, he isn't worried because he already took Mark's fortune and is sure that young man is poor once again and won't be allowed to marry Johanna. Mrs. Lovatt secretly helps Mark escape. Vowing to bring Todd to justice, a disguised Mark returns to the barbershop. He sends Tobias to tell Johanna where he is. Todd fails to recognize Mark and while he gets ready to shave his new customer, Pearley sneaks into Mrs. Lovatt's cellar. Todd pulls the lever, but Mark expects the chair to flip and holds on tight. Pearley helps him down safely and they leave the same way Mark originally escaped.

Todd is angry to find another victim missing and accuses Mrs. Lovatt of letting him escape. She admits to having let Mark go before. Todd readies himself to go on the run. He puts together his collection of stolen goods and begins stacking up hay and wooden furniture in the basement. Johanna comes to his door, worried that Mark has been captured and harmed. Todd knocks her unconscious, puts her in a closet, sets the building on fire and then leaves.

Nan informs Mark and Pearley that Johanna went to Todd's shop. They hurry to save her. As the barbershop burns down and a crowd gathers around, Todd watches from a nearby alleyway. When Mark goes inside to save Johanna, Todd follows and attempts to slash his throat. Mark manages to knock Todd unconscious and gets out with Johanna. On the street Johanna and Mark kiss. Beside them lies Todd's bag of riches in the alleyway. Todd regains consciousness. As he attempts to escape, his special chair flips him into the fiery cellar. Returning to 1936, the barber's terrified patron runs out of the shop while still wearing a full face of shaving cream.

== Cast ==
- Tod Slaughter as Sweeney Todd
- Stella Rho as Mrs. Lovatt
- John Singer as Tobias Ragg
- Eve Lister as Johanna Oakley
- Bruce Seton as Mark Ingerstreet
- D. J. Williams as Stephen Oakley
- Davina Craig as Nan
- Jerry Verno as Pearley
- Graham Soutten (credited as Ben Souten) as Beadle
- Billy Holland as Mr. Parsons
- Norman Pierce as Mr. Findlay
- Aubrey Mallalieu as Trader Paterson

== Production and style ==
Prior to the film, two previous adaptations of the character were produced in the United Kingdom. The first was Sweeney Todd from 1926 starring G.A. Baughan and again in 1928 with Moore Marriott as Sweeney Todd.

In The Unknown 30s: An Alternative History of the British Cinema 1929-1939 (1998), Jeffrey Richards stated the film was a simplified version of the story dramatized by George Dibdin-Pitt, noting that the story is simplified with events rearranged and some character eliminated. Richards stated what was kept was the familiar melodramatic elements including secret passages, disguises and star-crossed lovers.

Author Ian Conrich noted that British horror cinema is often absent from historical discourse in 1930s films, and not usually acknowledged until film companies like Hammer Films developed their work in the late 1950s. Conrich stated there were no true horror films of the era, but films that had a "horrific" nature that were predominantly comedies, thrillers or melodramas. The films of Tod Slaughter including The Face at the Window (1939) and Sweeney Todd, the Demon Barber of Fleet Street (1936) were described by Conrich as being "intended as melodramas: highly theatrical, mischievous and pantomimical."

== Release ==
Sweeney Todd, The Demon barber of Fleet Street was released in the United Kingdom in March 1936. The film was released in the United States in 1939 by Select Pictures. It was reissued in 1940.

== Reception ==
On its initial release, Kinematograph Weekly praised the production as a "colourful period thriller, smoothly adapted" while the Monthly Film Bulletin stated that the "Direction and much of the action belong to the stage." and "a certain amount of the necessarily gruesome atmosphere has been caught and the story itself is so good that the film has some success." On its release in the United States in 1939, Variety stated it would "find the pickings none too certain in this country [...] Tod Slaughter, billed as 'the horror man of Europe', is the star. He overacts ridiculously [...] From the action and dialog to the direction of George King the picture is stamped with mediocrity" and that "Technically, including photography, film is way below standard."

From a retrospective review, Kim Newman gave the film a three stars out of five rating, writing in Empire that the film was a "Wonderful Victorian horror melodrama brought to the big screen with one of the forgotten marvels of British cinema, Todd Slaughter on top form"
