= Boys Will Be Girls (film) =

1937 British film by Gilbert Pratt

- Directed by: Gilbert Pratt
- Written by: Evelyn Barrie; Jack Byrd; Syd Courtenay; Clifford Grey; H. F. Maltby
- Produced by: Joe Rock
- Starring: Leslie Fuller; Nellie Wallace; Greta Gynt; Georgie Harris
- Cinematography: Cyril Bristow
- Production company: Leslie Fuller Productions
- Distributed by: BIED
- Release date: July 1937
- Running time: 70 minutes
- Country: United Kingdom
- Language: English

Boys Will Be Girls is a 1937 British comedy film directed by Gilbert Pratt and starring Leslie Fuller, Nellie Wallace and Greta Gynt. It was written by Evelyn Barrie, Jack Byrd, Syd Courtenay, Clifford Grey and H. F. Maltby. In order to gain his inheritance, a man has to give up drinking and smoking.

== Plot ==
Bill Jenkins inherits a legacy from his late aunt Emily, but only on condition he gives up smoking and drinking, and leads a moral life. When his wife has to go away, she arranges for three men to keep her husband company, but they turn out to be girls, and Bill's inheritance turns out to be a monkey.

== Cast ==
- Leslie Fuller as Bill Jenkins
- Nellie Wallace as Bertha Luff
- Greta Gynt as Roberta (credited as Greta Woxholt)
- Georgie Harris as Roscoe
- Judy Kelly as Thelma
- D.J. Williams as George Luff
- Toni Edgar-Bruce as Mrs. Jenkins
- Constance Godridge as Ernestine
- Syd Crossley as Nolan
- Syd Courtenay as Rookum

== Production ==
The film was made by Fuller's own independent production company in the Rock Studios at Elstree.

== Reception ==
Kine Weekly wrote: "Leslie Tuller plays Bill with familiar gusto, and though Nellie Wallace is sufficient herself to please her followers, she has something of a character role to handle as the prying Bertha. Sound contributions in support come from Toni Bruce and Judy Kelly. There is nothing subtle in the comedy, which consists mainly of our hero's efforts to conceal frolicsome females in cupboards. Highlights include hilarious alcoholic dance, which ends in big drum by Fuller in night club, and spectacle of Nellie Wallace in old-fashioned underwear."

Picturegoer wrote: "Leslie Fuller is boisterously comic as the hero and Nellie Wallace is her familiar self as a woman who takes it upon her to see that he keeps to the letter of the will. Inebriated dance by Leslie Fuller and display of flannel underwear by Nellie Wallace provide biggest laughs."

The Daily Film Renter wrote: "Decked out with bunch of attractive girls, and usual trappings of knockabout, good, reliable entertainment for masses and star fans. Two of Britain's most popular entertainment personalities join forces here in a story that affords ample scope for their particular styles of humour. They are Leslie Fuller and Nellie Wallace, both experienced troupers, and the result of their collaboration is a film the masses should enjoy. ... It is all good fun, in the music hall style, while the combination of Fuller and Wallace is something likely to go down well at the box office."
