= Marie Wright (actress) =

British actress (1861–1949)

Marie Jeanne Wright (1862 – 1 May 1949) was a British stage and film actress. She was born in Dover and died in Hendon.

== Partial filmography ==
- God Bless Our Red, White and Blue (1918) - The Woman
- Quinneys (1919) - Mabel Dredge
- The Kinsman (1919) - Duchess
- Mrs. Thompson (1919) - Yates
- Testimony (1920) - Lizzie Emmett
- Paddy the Next Best Thing (1923) - Mary O'Hara
- The Sea Urchin (1926) - Mary Wynchbeck
- Unto Each Other (1929)
- Murder! (1930) - Miss Mitcham
- Tilly of Bloomsbury (1931) - Mrs. Banks
- Black Coffee (1931) - Miss Amory
- Up for the Cup (1931) - Mrs. Entwhistle
- Help Yourself (1931) - Sparrow
- A Lucky Sweep (1932) - Martha
- Naughty Cinderella (1933) - Mrs. Barrow
- This Acting Business (1933) - Mrs. Dooley
- Love's Old Sweet Song (1933) - Sarah
- A Cup of Kindness (1934) - Mrs. Mabel Ramsbottom
- City of Beautiful Nonsense (1935) - Dorothy Gray
- The Amazing Quest of Ernest Bliss (1936) - Mrs. Heath
- Hail and Farewell (1936) - Mrs. Perkins
- Victoria the Great (1937) - Old Kitty
- Silver Top (1938) - Mrs. Deeping
- Sexton Blake and the Hooded Terror (1938) - Mrs. Bardell
- Strange Boarders (1938) - Miss Toulson - Old Lady Who Gets Knocked Down (uncredited)
- Sixty Glorious Years (1938) - Maggie
- Black Eyes (1939) - Miss Brown
- Gaslight (1940) - Alice Barlow (final film role)
