= The Man Without a Face (1935 film) =

- Opening titles
- Directed by: George King
- Written by: St. John Erskine; Randall Faye; Michael Trevellian
- Produced by: Randall Faye
- Starring: Carol Coombe; Cyril Chosack; Moore Marriott
- Edited by: John Seabourne Sr.
- Production company: Embassy Pictures
- Distributed by: RKO Radio Pictures
- Release date: 25 September 1935
- Running time: 61 minutes
- Country: United Kingdom
- Language: English

The Man Without a Face is a 1935 British drama film directed by George King and starring Carol Coombe, Cyril Chosack and Moore Marriott. It was written by St. John Erskine, Randall Faye and Michael Trevellian, and was made as a quota quickie at Walton Studios.

== Synopsis ==
A man wrongly convicted of murder is able to escape when he is involved in a train crash and changes identity with another passenger, not realising that he is the real killer.

== Cast ==
- Carol Coombe as Joan Ellis
- Cyril Chosack as Billy Desmond
- Moore Marriott as Tinker John
- Ronald Ritchie as Paul Keefe
- Billy Holland as detective
- Ben Williams as warder
- Fred Withers
- Vi Kaley as landlady

== Reception ==
The Monthly Film Bulletin wrote: "Some of the photography is fine and the lighting and the composition of some shots are excellently contrived. ... The acting is bad – not entirely the fault of the actors – and the dialogue is extraordinarily poor; Carol Coombe does her best, but even her efforts are often unsuccessful. There is some very good material in the film, but it needs better direction and much better dialogue. ... The train scenes and the faceless man are pictorially too vivid for children."

Kine Weekly wrote: "Indifferent British crime drama, the story of which attempts with but poor success to reconcile murder mystery with idyllic romance. The direction is singularly lacking in imagination, the ready-made high spots are never scaled, the acting is mostly indifferent, and the dialogue and photography poor. Built to meagre quota measurements, the film has only this angle to recommend it."

The Daily Film Renter wrote: "Improbable story of young man wrongfully convicted of murder, who subsequently escapes in train smash, leaving body of mutilated victim in his place. The treatment is morbid, with narrative unconvincing owing to loose direction and 'dramatic school' acting. Theme has definitely unpleasant angles, and the whole thing lacks reality. Poor stuff as entertainment."
