= The Chinese Bungalow (1940 film) =

1940 British film by George King

- Directed by: George King
- Written by: Ronald Fayre; Matheson Lang (play); Marian Osmond (novel); A.R. Rawlinson; George Wellesley
- Produced by: George King
- Starring: Paul Lukas; Kay Walsh; Jane Baxter
- Cinematography: Hone Glendinning
- Edited by: Jack Harris
- Music by: Jack Beaver
- Production company: Pennant Pictures
- Distributed by: British Lion Films
- Release date: 6 April 1940
- Running time: 72 minutes
- Country: United Kingdom
- Language: English

The Chinese Bungalow (also known as Chinese Den) is a 1940 British drama film directed by George King and starring Kay Walsh, Jane Baxter and Paul Lukas. It was written by Ronald Fayre adapted from the 1925 play The Chinese Bungalow by Matheson Lang and Marion Osmond and James Corbett.

== Plot ==
Yuan Sing falls in love with English cabaret singer Sadie. They marry, but Sadie becomes bored and flirts with Harold Marquis. Sadie's cousin Charlotte visits but fails in her attempt to persuade Sadie to stop her relationship with Harold. When Yuan Sing find out, he poisons Harold.

== Cast ==
- Paul Lukas as Yuan Sing
- Kay Walsh as Sadie Merivale
- Jane Baxter as Charlotte Merivale
- Robert Douglas as Richard Marquess
- Wallace Douglas as Harold Marquess
- Jerry Verno as Stubbins
- Mayura as Ayah
- John Salew as Mr. Lum
- James Woodburn as Dr. Cameron

== Production ==
King was a former producer of quota quickies who was increasingly working on films with better budgets during the early war years.

The film was made at Beaconsfield Studios.

== Reception ==
The Monthly Film Bulletin wrote: "This re-make of a well-known stage and screen success has a theatrical and artificial plot, and does not attempt more than a superficial treatment of the clash of temperaments and traditions involved. The pace is swift, and the direction, up to a point, adroit. The cast is hampered by stilted and lifeless dialogue. Paul Lukas does not look Oriental, but makes a suave, dignified and impressive Yuan Sing. Jane Baxter gives an intelligent and sensitive performance as Charlotte, but Kay Walsh does not seem quite at home in the part of Sadie. The settings are effective and suggest satisfactorily Oriental opulence."

Kine Weekly wrote: "Here we have a screen melodrama which succeeds in being good theatre without being theatrical. The combination of circumstances upon which the story is built is in itself artificial, but so accurately are the characters drawn and so certain is the timing, and this applies particularly to the suspenseful climax, that holding entertainment accompanies every foot of the development. On top of this, it is well known that pictures with an Oriental flavour hold an irresistible fascination for all women and most men. Add star and title values, and .the answer is a picture with considerable box-office heritage."
