= Double Exposures =

1937 British film by John Paddy Carstairs

- Directed by: John Paddy Carstairs
- Written by: Gerald Elliott
- Produced by: George King
- Starring: David Langton; Julien Mitchell; Ruby Miller
- Cinematography: Hone Glendinning
- Edited by: John Seabourne Sr.
- Music by: Jack Beaver
- Production company: George King Productions (as Triangle Film Productions)
- Distributed by: Paramount British Pictures (U.K.)
- Release date: May 1937
- Running time: 67 minutes
- Country: United Kingdom
- Language: English

Double Exposures (also known as Alibi Breaker) is a 1937 British crime film directed by John Paddy Carstairs and starring David Langton, Julien Mitchell and Ruby Miller. It was written by Gerald Elliott, and made at Shepperton Studios as a quota quickie.

== Plot ==
Reporter Peter Bradfield is fired from his newspaper for failing to deliver an interview with big businessman Hector Rodman. Plucky Bradfield subsequently becomes a photographic equipment salesman, and accidentally takes photos of two men in conversation. Unbeknown to him, these men are the businessmen's lawyer and his secretary, and are plotting to embezzle a fortune in bonds from Rodman, and planning to frame his workshy son George for the crime.

== Cast ==
- David Langton as Peter Bradfield [credited as Basil Langton]
- Julien Mitchell as Hector Rodman
- Ruby Miller as Mrs. Rodman
- Brian Buchel as Geoffrey Cranswick
- Mavis Clair as Jill Rodman
- Fred Withers as Allbutt
- Ivor Barnard as Mather
- George Astley as George Rodman
- Frank Birch as Kempton
- Denis Cowles as Police Inspector

== Critical reception ==
The Monthly Film Bulletin wrote: "The development of the story is always obvious and the direction and acting are poor. There is very little suspense and the humour is mainly unintentional."

TV Guide called the film a "Negligible British effort".
