= Under a Cloud (film) =

- Opening titles
- Directed by: George King
- Written by: Gordon Francis
- Produced by: George King
- Starring: Edward Rigby; Betty Ann Davies; Hilda Bayley
- Cinematography: Hone Glendinning
- Edited by: John Seabourne Sr.
- Music by: Jack Beaver
- Production company: George King Productions
- Distributed by: Paramount British Pictures
- Release date: August 1937
- Running time: 67 minutes
- Country: United Kingdom
- Language: English

Under a Cloud is a 1937 British comedy film directed by George King and starring Betty Ann Davies, Edward Rigby and Hilda Bayley. It was written by Gordon Francis and made at Shepperton Studios as a quota quickie for release by Paramount Pictures.

The screenplay concerns a man who returns from Australia and tries to reconcile with his estranged family.

== Plot ==
When con-man Jimmy Forbes returns to England after many years in exile in Australia, he finds that his wife Rosalyn has become a leading socialite, and that his children Diana and George believe he is dead. After telling the kids that he is an old friend of their father, he takes up residence in his wife's home. Although no one likes him, when he helps George when he gets involved with murder, he is accepted.

== Cast ==
- Edward Rigby as Jimmy Forbes
- Betty Ann Davies as Diana Forbes
- Hilda Bayley as Rosalyn Forbes
- Bernard Clifton as George Forbes
- Moira Reed as Mary Jessyl
- Peter Gawthorne as Sir Edmond Jessyl
- Renee Gadd as Judy St. John
- Billy Watts as Rodney Marsh
- Brian Buchel as Arnold Gill
- Jack Vyvian as Inspector Bryan
- Howard Douglas as gambler on ship

== Reception ==
The Monthly Film Bulletin wrote: "The direction is sometimes slow, but gathers speed towards the end. Edward Rigby carries the film as Jimmy Forbes, giving an excellent portrayal of the lovable rough diamond. He is well supported by Hilda Bayley as Mrs. Forbes and Betty-Ann Davies as Diana. The parts of George and his fiancée Mary are slight."

Kine Weekly wrote: "Design is theatrical, the development stilted and obvious and the atmosphere phoney. Quota booking for the uncritical. ... Edward Rigby scores occasionally as Forbes but Betty-Ann Davies, Hilda Bayley, Bernard Clifton, Peter Gawthorne and Renee Gadd fail to draw lifelike character in support. ... The story has an idea, but indifferent direction and acting prevent it from being exploited on entertaining lines. For the most part the film bores."
