= John Halifax (film) =

- Directed by: George King
- Written by: A. R. Rawlinson
- Based on: John Halifax, Gentleman by Dinah Craik
- Produced by: George King; Odette King
- Starring: John Warwick; Nancy Burne; Roddy McDowall
- Cinematography: Hone Glendinning
- Edited by: John Seabourne Sr.
- Music by: Jack Beaver
- Production companies: George King Productions; George Minter Productions
- Distributed by: Metro-Goldwyn-Mayer
- Release date: March 1938
- Running time: 69 minutes
- Country: United Kingdom
- Language: English

John Halifax aka John Halifax, Gentleman is a 1938 British second feature ('B') historical drama film directed by George King and starring John Warwick, Nancy Burne and Roddy McDowall. It was written by A. R. Rawlinson based on the 1856 novel John Halifax, Gentleman by Dinah Craik.

== Cast ==
- John Warwick as John Halifax
- Nancy Burne as Ursula March
- Ralph Michael as Phineas Fletcher
- D.J. Williams as Abel Fletcher
- Brian Buchel as Lord Luxmore
- Billy Bray as Tully
- Elsie Wagstaff as Jael
- W.E. Holloway as Mr. Jessop
- Hugh Bickett as Doctor Grainger
- Roddy McDowall as boy

== Production ==
It was made at Shepperton Studios. The film's sets were designed by Philip Bawcombe

== Reception ==
The Monthly Film Bulletin wrote: "The direction is slow and inclined to be uneven, while the crowd scenes are rarely convincing. The acting is fairly good. D. J. Williams gives a good study of the stern Abel Fletcher. Brian Buchel as Luxmore seems uncomfortable in his part, and his acting is a little forced, making the gestures of the wicked lord melodramatic instead of impressive. The sets are adequate in giving some idea of the atmosphere of the time; the make-up to show the ageing of the characters is very badly done, and the final scene is a little long-drawn."

Kine Weekly wrote: "The picture has sincerity of treatment but neither the star nor the director is really big enough for the job. John Warwick's performance lacks character, while the technical presentation permits of but cursory glimpses of the industrial history of the period. A costume piece made to modest quota measurements, it can rank no higher than a second feature for family halls."

Picturegoer wrote: "In spite of the fact that the classic novel has been treated with sincerity and is well costumed it does not hold the attention at all well, mainly because it is very slow in development and partly because the characterisation is not all that could be desired; the artistes do not appear to be at home in period costume."

In British Sound Films: The Studio Years 1928–1959 David Quinlan rated the film as "mediocre", writing: "Lifeless period drama is a catalogue of missed chances."
