= Maria Marten, or The Murder in the Red Barn =

1935 film by Milton Rosmer

- Directed by: Milton Rosmer
- Written by: Randall Faye
- Produced by: George King
- Starring: Tod Slaughter
- Cinematography: George Stretton
- Edited by: Charles Saunders
- Music by: Leo T. Croke
- Release date: 16 August 1936
- Running time: 69 minutes 58 minutes (Ontario, Canada)
- Country: United Kingdom
- Language: English

Maria Marten, or The Murder in the Red Barn (also known as Maria Marten and Murder in the Red Barn) is a 1935 British film melodrama film directed by Milton Rosmer and starring Tod Slaughter and Eric Portman. It was written by Randall Faye and was made as a quota quickie. It is based on the true story of the 1827 Red Barn Murder, in which a 25-year-old woman was killed by her lover and her stepmother claimed to have dreamt of the murder the night of the event.

== Plot ==
Squire of the village William Corder gets village maiden Maria into trouble. Believing her seducer is her admirer Carlos, a gyspy, her father throws her out of the house. When she turns to the Squire, in fear of exposure he murders her in a barn and buries the body, in the hope that Carlos will be the main suspect. Carlos comes to confront Corder, who chases him to the barn, where a dog discovers the body. Corder is arrested and sentenced to death. The hangman is Carlos.

== Cast ==
- Tod Slaughter as Squire William Corder
- Sophie Stewart as Maria Marten
- D. J. Williams as Farmer Thomas Marten
- Eric Portman as Carlos, the gypsy
- Clare Greet as Mrs. Marten
- Gerard Tyrell as Timothy Winterbottom
- Ann Trevor as Nan, the maid
- Stella Rho as gypsy crone
- Dennis Hoey as gambling winner
- Quentin McPhearson as Matthew Sennett
- Antonia Brough as Maud Sennett
- Noel Dainton as Officer Steele of the Bow Street Runners

== Reception ==
Kine Weekly wrote: "Put over in the best traditions of transpontine melodrama, the famous story of 'The Murder in the Red Barn' should repeat on the screen the success it has enjoyed for years on the stage. It follows its original closely, and while no attempt has been made to burlesque it, it should prove thoroughly amusing to the sophisticated, and chill the marrow of the unsophisticated. ... Tod Slaughter plays the squire with all the theatricality and emphasis which are the hall-marks of thick-ear melodrama. It is an excellent performance of its kind."

The Daily Film Renter wrote: "Talkie version of renowned barn-storming thriller, featuring Tod Slaughter as villainous squire who betrays heroine, murders her, and buries body in red barn. Played straight, film neither qualifies as serious work or riotous burlesque, but audiences who know and like this old-time melodrama and star's portrayal, may find it of interest. It will hardly do, however, for sophisticated patrons."

Picture Show wrote: "The fame of the old melodrama has spread far and wide, and this film version of it is somewhat disappointing. It seems as if neither director nor players were certain whether it should be burlesque or plain melodrama. Tod Slaughter, who has produced the play so often, has the role of William Corder, the wicked murderer, and acts with a touch of burlesque which makes his role entertaining, but the remainder of the players fail to follow his lead, and the result is somewhat tiresome."
