= Hone Glendinning =

British cinematographer (1912–1997)

- Born: 16 August 1912; London, United Kingdom
- Died: 26 August 1997 (aged 85); Gorokan, New South Wales, Australia
- Other name: Hone McMahon Glendining
- Occupation: Cinematographer
- Years active: 1934–1964 (film)

Hone Glendinning (16 August 1912 – 26 August 1997) was a British cinematographer. He worked on over seventy films, including a number of documentaries, specialising in colour travelogues or widescreen theatrical shorts, frequently for American producer and narrator James A. FitzPatrick.

== Selected filmography ==
- Bypass to Happiness (1934)
- Rolling Home (1935)
- David Livingstone (1936)
- Merry Comes to Town (1937)
- Auld Lang Syne (1937)
- The Ticket of Leave Man (1937)
- Double Exposures (1937)
- It's Never Too Late to Mend (1937)
- Under a Cloud (1937)
- Riding High (1937)
- The Mill on the Floss (1937)
- John Halifax (1938)
- Silver Top (1938)
- Sexton Blake and the Hooded Terror (1938)
- The Face at the Window (1939)
- Crimes at the Dark House (1940)
- All at Sea (1940)
- The Chinese Bungalow (1940)
- The Case of the Frightened Lady (1940)
- Code of Scotland Yard (1947)
- But Not in Vain (1948)
- The Romantic Age (1949)
- Forbidden (1949)
- Midnight Episode (1950)
- Shadow of the Past (1950)
- Three Steps in the Dark (1953)
- The Harassed Hero (1954)
- Meet Mr. Malcolm (1954)
- Two Men of Fiji (1959)
- The Finest Hours (1964)
- The Scarlet Web (1954)

== Bibliography ==
- Michael F. Keaney. British Film Noir Guide. McFarland, 2008.
