= The Shuttle of Life =

1920 film

- Directed by: D. J. Williams
- Written by: Isobel Bray
- Starring: C. Aubrey Smith
- Release date: November 1920
- Running time: Five reels
- Country: United Kingdom
- Language: Silent

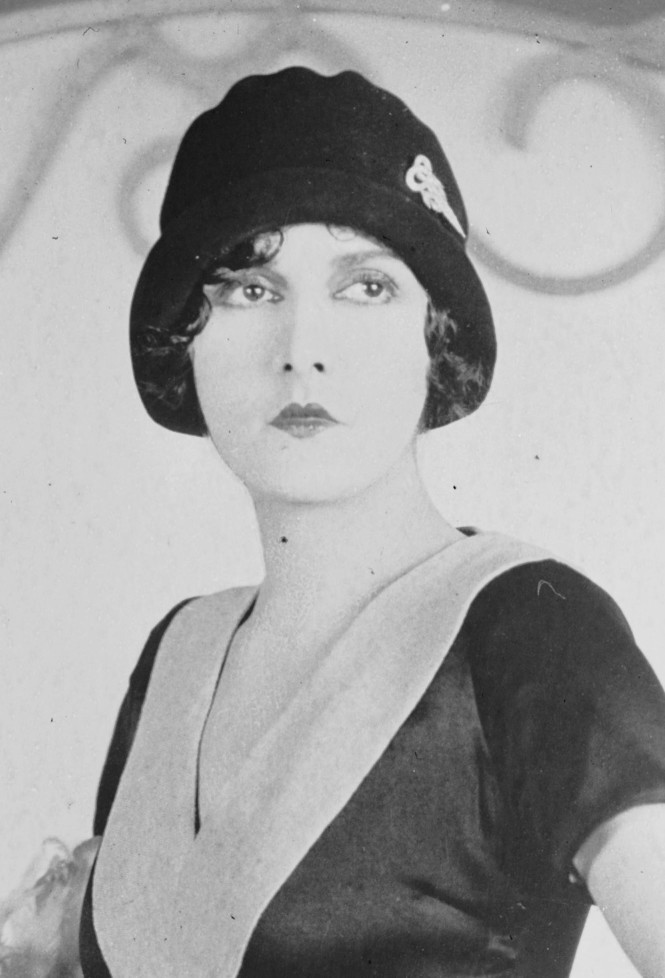
Evelyn Brent was an American actress known for her roles in silent films and early talkies. She was a prominent star in the early 20th century, particularly known for her dramatic performances.

The Shuttle of Life is a 1920 silent British drama film directed by D. J. Williams. The film is considered to be lost.

== Plot ==
An actress poses as dead heiress, who then dies in burning building fighting blackmailing a detective.

== Cast ==
- C. Aubrey Smith as Reverend John Stone
- Evelyn Brent as Miriam Grey
- Jack Hobbs as Ray Sinclair
- Gladys Jennings as Audrey Bland
- Bert Darley as Tom
- Cecil Ward as Meeson
- Rachel de Solla as Mrs. Bland
