= George King (film director) =

English film director (1899–1966)

- King in a trade advertisement (The Daily Film Renter, January 1938)
- Born: 1899; London, England, United Kingdom
- Died: 26 June 1966 (aged 66-67); London, England, United Kingdom
- Occupations: Film director; film producer; choreographer; screenwriter; actors agent
- Years active: 1918 – 1957

George King (1899 – 26 June 1966) was an English film director, producer and screenplay writer. He has been called ‘King of the Quota Quickies’, due to his prodigious output of over 50 low-budget British films of the 1930s and 1940s, comprising thrillers, melodramas and comedy.

== Career ==
King entered the film industry after dropping out of medical school. His first film was Too Many Crooks (1930), now lost, which featured Laurence Olivier in his film debut.

He directed eight films starring Todd Slaughter, which film historian Steve Chibnall describes as "barnstorming productions, with their dastardly villains, endangered maidens and thick slices of ham acting, [constituting] the last flowerings of the Victorian theatrical tradition."

In the war years he worked in feature films such as Candlelight in Algeria (1944) with James Mason, and later The Shop at Sly Corner (1947), the debut of Diana Dors. His final professional work was in 1957, when he moved into TV to produce The Gay Cavalier adventure series for ITV.

King died of bronchial pneumonia on 26 June 1966.

== Filmography ==
=== Director ===
- Too Many Crooks (1930)
- Leave It to Me (1930), also producer
- Number, Please (1931)
- The Professional Guest (1931)
- Deadlock (1931), also producer
- Midnight (1931), also writer
- Self Made Lady (1932), also producer
- Men of Steel (1932)
- Smithy (1933)
- Beware of Women (1933)
- Enemy of the Police (1933)
- Her Imaginary Lover (1933)
- High Finance (1933)
- I Adore You (1933)
- Matinee Idol (1933)
- Mayfair Girl (1933)
- To Brighton with Gladys (1933)
- Too Many Wives (1933)
- The Office Wife (1934)
- To Be a Lady (1934)
- Guest of Honour (1934)
- The Blue Squadron (1934)
- Get Your Man (1934)
- Little Stranger (1934), also writer
- Murder at the Inn (1934)
- Nine Forty-Five (1934)
- Oh No Doctor! (1934), also writer
- The Silver Spoon (1934)
- Full Circle (1935)
- Gay Old Dog (1935)
- The Man Without a Face (1935)
- Windfall (1935)
- Adventure Ltd. (1935)
- The Crimes of Stephen Hawke (1936)
- Reasonable Doubt (1936)
- Sweeney Todd: The Demon Barber of Fleet Street (1936)
- Wanted! (1937)
- Merry Comes to Town (1937)
- The Ticket of Leave Man (1937)
- Under a Cloud (1937), also producer
- John Halifax (1938), also producer
- Sexton Blake and the Hooded Terror (1938), also producer
- Silver Top (1938), also producer
- The Face at the Window (1939), also producer
- George and Margaret (1940)
- Two for Danger (1940)
- The Case of the Frightened Lady (1940)
- The Chinese Bungalow (1940), also producer
- Crimes at the Dark House (1940), also producer
- Tomorrow We Live (1943)
- Candlelight in Algeria (1944)
- Gaiety George (1946), also producer
- The Shop at Sly Corner (1947), also producer
- Forbidden (1949), also producer

=== Producer ===
- To Be a Lady (1934)
- Get Your Man (1934)
- Handle with Care (1935)
- Lend Me Your Husband (1935)
- Maria Marten (1935)
- Wanted (1937)
- Double Exposures (1937)
- The Elder Brother (1937)
- It's Never Too Late to Mend (1937)
- Merry Comes to Town (1937)
- Riding High (1937)
- The First of the Few (1942)
- Eight O'Clock Walk (1954)
- The Gay Cavalier (1957) TV series
