= The Ticket of Leave Man (1937 film) =

- Directed by: George King
- Written by: H. F. Maltby; A.R. Rawlinson
- Based on: play by Tom Taylor
- Starring: See below
- Cinematography: Hone Glendinning
- Edited by: Robert Walters
- Music by: Jack Beaver
- Release date: 1937
- Running time: 71 minutes
- Country: United Kingdom
- Language: English

The Ticket of Leave Man is a 1937 British thriller film directed by George King and starring Tod Slaughter, John Warwick and Marjorie Taylor. It was written by H. F. Maltby and A.R. Rawlinson based on the 1863 melodrama The Ticket-of-Leave Man by Tom Taylor that introduced the character Hawkshaw the Detective. The film's title refers to the ticket of leave, which was issued to convicts when they were released.

== Plot ==
Robert Brierly is falsely accused of passing forged banknotes after being framed by his love rival, the murderous criminal known as the Tiger. After he is given a ticket of leave (a form of early parole), he faces scrutiny and discrimination as a former convict.

Still in love with Brierly's fiancé May Edwards, the Tiger seeks to have Brierly locked in prison for life. After Brierly begins working at a bank under a false identity, the Tiger devises a plan to frame him for robbery and murder.

== Cast ==
- Tod Slaughter as The Tiger
- John Warwick as Robert Brierly
- Marjorie Taylor as May Edwards
- Frank Cochran as Melter Moss
- Robert Adair as Hawkshaw the detective
- Peter Gawthorne as Joshua Gibson
- Jenny Lynn as Mrs. Willoughby
- Arthur West Payne as Sam Willoughby
- Norman Pierce as Maltby
- Billy Bray as Jackson

== Reception ==
Kine Weekly wrote: "Much of the treatment is deliberate burlesque, but so vital and gorgeously heavy-handed is the acting of Tod Slaughter that many thrills are permitted to mingle with laughter. The entertainment has balance, and what is more, it comes from the stable that specialises successfully in the colourful resuscitations of hearty museum pieces. Good novelty booking for the masses. ... Tod Slaughter as The Tiger adds another fruity character cameo to his already famous gallery of rogues. ... John Watwick is tremendously true-blue as the victimised Brierley, Marjorie Taylor is esffective as the tender, long-suffering May, and Frank Cochran, Robert-Adair and Peter Gawthorne are true to the spirit of the melodrama ... The picture parodies the macabre in terms of good popular entertainment."
