= Silver Top =

- Directed by: George King
- Written by: Gerald Elliott; Dorothy Greenhill; Evadne Price
- Produced by: George King
- Starring: Marie Wright; Betty Ann Davies; David Farrar
- Cinematography: Hone Glendinning
- Production company: George King Productions
- Distributed by: Paramount British Pictures
- Release date: January 1938
- Running time: 66 minutes
- Country: United Kingdom
- Language: English

Silver Top is a 1938 British crime film directed by George King and starring Marie Wright, Betty Ann Davies, David Farrar and Marjorie Taylor. It was written by Gerald Elliott, Dorothy Greenhill and Evadne Price, and made at Shepperton Studios as a quota quickie.

== Preservation status ==
The British Film Institute National Archive holds a collection of ephemera but no film or video materials.

== Synopsis ==
Criminals Dushka Vernon and Flash Gerald decide to swindle elderly sweet shop owner Mrs Deeping, living in a country village, out of her money by producing her "long-lost son" who is really "The Babe", one of their gang, just released from prison. However, once he takes up his disguise he begins to become entranced with the quiet country village and falls in love with the vicar's daughter. He ends up refusing to help his former criminal associates and reveals his true identity to the villagers.

== Cast ==
- Marie Wright as Mrs Deeping
- Betty Ann Davies as Dushka Vernon
- Marjorie Taylor as Hazel Summers
- David Farrar as "The Babe"
- Brian Buchel as Flash Gerald
- Bryan Herbert as Jem Withers
- Polly Emery as Martha Bains
- Isobel Scaife as Aggie Murbles

== Reception ==
The Monthly Film Bulletin wrote: "This naive, sentimental and novelettish story develops slowly and wordily. The crook episode is unconvincing, and the comedy relief supplied by village gossip is only mildly entertaining. The painstaking cast is worthy of better material."

Kine Weekly wrote: "Crime and sentiment do not form a particularly impressive partnership, but much of the character drawing is human and the atmosphere is friendly, and it is these attributes that just outweigh story ingenuousness. The film has its uses as a quota supporting feature for other than class halls."

Picture Show wrote: "It is rather long drawn out, unexciting, with far more talk than action. Fairly well acted."
