= Elsie Wagstaff =

English actress (1899–1985)

- Publicity still, 1954
- Born: 1 July 1899; Leytonstone, Essex, England
- Died: 16 July 1985 (aged 86); Kensington, London, England
- Education: Guildhall School of Music
- Years active: 1923-1974
- Spouse: Bernard Jukes (1924-1939) (his death)

Elsie Wagstaff (1 July 1899 – 16 July 1985) was an English actress. Educated at the Guildhall School of Music, her stage work began in the chorus in 1919, and one of her first leading roles was as Sadie Thompson in an adaptation of Somerset Maugham's Rain. In 1928, she appeared on Broadway in John Van Druten's Diversion, and in Arnold Ridley and Bernard Merivale's The Wrecker. She also worked sporadically in films, and with some regularity on television.

== Selected filmography ==
- Apron Fools (1936)
- Cotton Queen (1937) as Emily (uncredited)
- John Halifax (1938) as Jael
- Lassie from Lancashire (1938) as Aunt Hetty
- Trouble Brewing (1939) as Mrs. Hopkins
- Crimes at the Dark House (1940) as Mrs. Catherick
- The Dark Tower (1943) as Eve
- Headline (1944) as Mrs Daly
- Welcome, Mr. Washington (1944) as Miss Jones
- Meet Sexton Blake! (1945) as Mrs. Baird
- Old Mother Riley at Home (1945) as Mrs. Ginochie
- Appointment with Crime (1946) as Mrs. Wilkins
- The Interrupted Journey (1949) as Wilding's Maid
- Celia (1949) as Aunt Nora
- Eight O'Clock Walk (1954) as Mrs Peskitt
- The End of the Affair (1955) as Bendrix Landlady
- You Pay Your Money (1957) as Ada Seymour
- Barnacle Bill (1957) as Mrs Gray
- Saturday Night and Sunday Morning (1960) as Mrs Seaton
- The Snake Woman (1961) as Aggie Harker
- Whistle Down the Wind (1961) as Auntie Dorothy
- Dr. Syn, Alias the Scarecrow (1963) as Mrs. Ransley
- Heavens Above! (1963) as Lady on Parish Church Council
- Frankenstein and the Monster from Hell (1974) as Wild one
