= Gay Old Dog =

- Edward Rigby, Moore Marriott and Annie Esmond in the film
- Directed by: George King
- Written by: Enid Fabia; Reginald Faye
- Produced by: Randall Faye; George King
- Starring: Edward Rigby; Moore Marriott; Ruby Miller
- Production company: Embassy Pictures
- Distributed by: RKO Radio Pictures
- Release date: 27 April 1936
- Running time: 62 minutes
- Country: United Kingdom
- Language: English

Gay Old Dog is a 1935 British comedy film directed by George King and starring Edward Rigby, Moore Marriott and Ruby Miller. It was written by Enid Fabia and Reginald Faye, and was a quota quickie made at Walton Studios.

== Plot ==
Tom and George Bliss are brothers living in the same house, the former a veterinary surgeon, the latter a doctor. In George's absence, Tom delivers the illegitimate child of Judith, a woman they meet, and the brothers adopt her and her child. The brothers' nephew Philip, a medical student, falls in love with Judith. Meanwhile Tom falls for Mrs. Vernon, a gold-digger, who fleeces him. Following this, when Judith's child is injured in a fall, Philip is obliged to operate, since George is away.

== Cast ==
- Edward Rigby as Tom Bliss
- Moore Marriott as George Bliss
- Ruby Miller as Mrs. Vernon
- Marguerite Allan as Judith
- Annie Esmond as Mrs. Gambit
- Joan Wyndham as Betty
- Patrick Barr as Phillip
- John Singer as Andrew V. Oakes
- Billy Holland as Captain Black
- Vi Kaley
- Norman Pierce
- Ben Williams

== Reception ==
The Monthly Film Bulletin wrote: "Edward Rigby makes Tom a pleasant and very likeable man, and Ruby Miller brings dash and vigour into the part of the golddigger; nevertheless the film is too slow for the interest to be maintained, and the humour is not spontaneous enough to counterbalance this."

Kine Weekly wrote: "Unpretentious comedy drama, the story of which pivots on the strong bond of affection existing between two bachelor brothers. Although the film is simple fare, it contains in its sentimental theme, sly humour, topical trimmings, and the clever character drawing of Edward Rigby, qualities that make for sound mass entertainment."
