= Norman Pierce =

British actor (1900–1968)

- in The Magic Box (1951)
- Born: 5 September 1900; Southport, Lancashire, England
- Died: 22 March 1968 (aged 67); Helions Bumpstead, Essex, England
- Occupation: Film actor
- Years active: 1935 - 1968

Norman Pierce (5 September 1900 – 22 March 1968) was a British actor. He was born in Southport, Lancashire. He died in Helions Bumpstead, Essex, England on 22 March 1968 at the age of 67. He played pub landlords and barmen in a number of different films.

His West End stage roles included Frank Harvey's Brighton Rock and Ronald Millar's Waiting for Gillian.

== Selected filmography ==
- Number, Please (1931, Short) - Inspector
- Gay Old Dog (1935)
- Can You Hear Me, Mother? (1935) - Joe
- This Green Hell (1936) - Willington
- Sweeney Todd: The Demon Barber of Fleet Street (1936) - Mr. Findlay
- The Crimes of Stephen Hawke (1936) - Landlord
- To Catch a Thief (1936) - (uncredited)
- Everything Is Thunder (1936) - Hans
- Busman's Holiday (1937) - Crook
- Brief Ecstasy (1937) - Landlord
- The Ticket of Leave Man (1937) - Maltby
- Second Best Bed (1938) - Torceston Magistrate (uncredited)
- Special Edition (1938) - Aiken
- The Return of the Frog (1938) - Policeman (uncredited)
- Sexton Blake and the Hooded Terror (1938) - Inspector Bramley
- The Four Feathers (1939) - Sergeant Brown
- Flying Fifty-Five (1939) - Keats
- Poison Pen (1939) - Village Policeman (uncredited)
- The Thief of Bagdad (1940) - Minor Role (uncredited)
- Saloon Bar (1940) - Bill Hoskins
- South American George (1941) - (uncredited)
- Front Line Kids (1942) - P.C. Rozzer
- Uncensored (1942) - (uncredited)
- In Which We Serve (1942) - Mr Satterthwaite
- Went the Day Well? (1942) - Jim Sturry
- The Bells Go Down (1943) - Pa Robbins
- The Life and Death of Colonel Blimp (1943) - Mr Wynne
- Undercover (1943) - Lieut. Franke
- The Saint Meets the Tiger (1943) - Captain (uncredited)
- Champagne Charlie (1944) - Landlord of Elephant & Castle
- Mr. Emmanuel (1944) - Capt. John Cooper
- Great Day (1945) - Policeman
- The Voice Within (1946) - Publican
- I See a Dark Stranger (1946) - Dance MC
- Send for Paul Temple (1946) - Sergeant Morrison
- Frieda (1947) - Crawley
- Blanche Fury (1948) - Coroner
- My Brother's Keeper (1948) - Policeman at Shorebury (uncredited)
- Elizabeth of Ladymead (1948) - (uncredited)
- William Comes to Town (1948) - Police Sergeant
- Badger's Green (1949) - Sam Rogers
- The Twenty Questions Murder Mystery (1950) - Golf Club Barman (uncredited)
- Chance of a Lifetime (1950) - Franklin
- The Magic Box (1951) - Speaker in Connaught Rooms
- The Case of the Missing Scene (1951) - Sam
- Angels One Five (1952) - 'Bonzo'
- Escape Route (1952) - Inspector Hobbs (uncredited)
- When Knighthood Was in Flower (1953) - Innkeeper
- Port of Escape (1956) - Policeman
- It's Great to Be Young (1956) - Publican
- Tread Softly Stranger (1958) - Publican
- The Rough and the Smooth (1959) - Barman
- The Brides of Dracula (1960) - Landlord
