= The Face at the Window (1939 film) =

- Opening titles
- Directed by: George King
- Written by: A. R. Rawlinson (scenario and dialogue); Randall Faye (treatment)
- Based on: the "Famous Melodrama", The Face at the Window by F. Brooke Warren
- Produced by: George King
- Starring: Tod Slaughter
- Cinematography: Hone Glendinning
- Edited by: Jack Harris
- Music by: Jack Beaver
- Production company: George King Productions
- Distributed by: British Lion Film Corporation (UK); Arthur Ziehm, Inc. (U.S.)
- Release date: April 1939 (UK)
- Running time: 65 minutes
- Country: United Kingdom
- Language: English

The Face at the Window is a 1939 British horror film directed by George King and starring Tod Slaughter and Marjorie Taylor. It was the second sound film adaptation of the 1897 stage melodrama by F. Brooke Warren after the 1932 version.

== Plot ==
In Paris in 1880, a series of murders is distinguished by a grotesque face appearing at each victim's window. The crimes are attributed to a mysterious Wolf Man. Bank clerk Lucien Cortier is accused of being the perpetrator, and seeks to uncover the true identity of the murderer. The courtly but sinister Chevalier Lucio del Gardo has his own reasons for implicating Cortier for the murders.

== Cast ==
- Tod Slaughter as Chevalier Lucio del Gardo
- Marjorie Taylor as Cecile de Brisson
- John Warwick as Lucien Cortier
- Leonard Henry as Gaston, the cook
- Aubrey Mallalieu as M. de Brisson
- Robert Adair as Police Inspector Gouffert
- Wallace Evennett as Professor LeBlanc
- Kay Lewis as Babette, the maid
- Bill Shine as Pierre, Babette's Beau
- Margaret Yarde as La Pinan
- Harry Terry as The Face at the Window

== Reception ==
Tod Slaughter was one of Britain's most popular film personalities, placing reliably in the Motion Picture Herald's annual polls of "The Money Making Stars of Britain" through 1942. He always ranked in the top hundred, usually between #40 and #60, and his films found steady acceptance in the home countries.

In America, however, Slaughter's blood-and-thunder films were too British in theme, too old-fashioned and broadly played for mainstream audiences, and thus they were not released by any of the major film companies. Instead they were handled by independent distributors in New York (usually Select Attractions or Arthur Ziehm, Inc.), and they did attract a specialized following among horror fans. On at least two occasions a Slaughter picture was paired with another British thriller for a "super-shocker" double feature, to cash in on the successful nationwide double bill of Universal's Dracula and Frankenstein.

== Reviews ==
Tod Slaughter's especially florid The Face at the Window received good notices upon its release. The British Film Institute said, "This plot lends itself to both melodramatic direction and melodramatic acting. Tod Slaughter's acting is very melodramatic, full of starts, gnashing teeth, and villainous smiles, but this suits the peculiar march of events." Kinematograph Weekly wrote, "Tod Slaughter plays the stock role, that of villain, in his own inimitable manner and leaves no stone unturned to earn hisses. Incidentally, the theme is as before -- bump 'em off and the girl is mine. Laugh at it or with it, no matter, it is from stem to spectacular stern good Tod Slaughter and, at the same time, 'in the bag' mass entertainment."

London's Daily Film Renter had special praise for the lead: "Slaughter big drawing card for popular audiences, especially in his own type of stuff."

The Face at the Window was released in America as a Halloween attraction in October 1940, and it seemed made to order for audiences to indulge their fondness for rip-roaring thrills. The trade paper Showmen's Trade Review advised, "If audiences will let themselves go, they'll have a good time viewing this old-fashioned meller. The characters seem to have a great time acting all over the place. Almost anyone who views this will have as good a time as the characters."

Paul Mooney, Jr. of Motion Picture Herald agreed: "Unabashedly a melodrama of the 'unhand me villain, my heart is pledged to another' cliche this British production has much to recommend it – the hero, villain, and the girl overact in an authentic reproduction of the melodrama circa 1880, and, in addition, it is a pretty good mystery."

Motion Picture Daily summed it up: "A splendid horror film. The situations are highly implausible, of course, and the film will probably be met with cynical reaction by some audiences, but it is perfect entertainment for the addicts of screen terrorism."

Contemporary reviewers appreciate Tod Slaughter's flamboyant approach. Film Weekly called The Face at the Window "a vintage thriller, put over in the right, rich spirit of years ago"; while more recently Britmovie praised "a sinister Tod Slaughter hamming it up marvellously." and the Radio Times wrote, "As with any film featuring the outrageously operatic antics of early horror star Tod Slaughter, this slow, stagebound murder-mystery would be completely unwatchable without the producer-star's presence."
