= Too Many Crooks (1930 film) =

1930 film

- Theatrical release poster
- Directed by: George King
- Written by: Billie Bristow; Basil Roscoe
- Produced by: George King
- Starring: Laurence Olivier; Dorothy Boyd; Arthur Stratton
- Music by: William Hodgson (as W. Hodgson)
- Production company: George King Productions
- Distributed by: Fox Film Company (UK)
- Release date: August 1930 (UK)
- Running time: 38 minutes
- Country: United Kingdom
- Language: English

Too Many Crooks is a 1930 British comedy crime film directed by George King and starring Laurence Olivier, Dorothy Boyd and Arthur Stratton. It was written by Billie Bristow and Basil Roscoe.

The film is missing from the BFI National Archive, and is listed as one of the British Film Institute's "75 Most Wanted" lost films.

== Premise ==
A man tries to burgle his own safe on the same night that a professional criminal attempts it.

== Cast ==
- Laurence Olivier as the boy
- Dorothy Boyd as the girl
- A. Bromley Davenport as the man upstairs
- Mina Burnett as the maid downstairs
- Arthur Stratton as the burglar
- Ellen Pollock as the other girl

== Production ==
The film was shot at Twickenham Studios as a quota quickie for distribution by Fox Film.

== Reception ==
Kine Weekly wrote: "A very creditabie little picture, well acted and capably produced. The composition of the light comedy plot keeps it entertaining all through. ... Dorothy Boyd acts well as the girl, and Laurence Olivier is excellent as the boy. He shows possibilities, which it is to be hoped will be exploited. Arthur Stratton makes a very good comedy Bill Sykes, while Bromley Davenport brings all the polish he possesses on the stage to the screen. There is nothing pretentious about the film, and that is one reasen why it is so successful. Direction is good, and there is a good sense displayed of comedy values. The dialogue is bright and the situation original. George King is to be congratulated on his work."

The Daily Film Renter wrote: "A more than creditable British offering, exceptionally well acted by a nicely balanced cast, and offering real story originality, bright dialogue, and an effective ending of the surprise type. ... The action hangs fire slightly during the rather prolonged first conversation between the hero and the girl, but otherwise it doesn't let up in interest for a moment, due to the excellent acting of Laurence Olivier in the first place, of Dorothy Boyd in the second, and, when he appears, of Bromley Davenport. The first has excellent lines, and delivers them with an engaging whimsicality. The direction is decidedly skilful. Too Many Crooks may be described as a dramatic trifle, but if its standard in direction, characterisation, acting and material were more commonly found in British production, exhibitors would not complain of their Quota obligations."
