= D. J. Williams (actor) =

British actor (1868–1949)

D.J. Williams

David John Williams (1868–1949) was a British actor. He also directed one film, The Shuttle of Life, which starred Evelyn Brent.

Williams was born in Ruthin, North Wales. He was the nephew of the Anglo-German artist Hubert von Herkomer. He had a daughter, Mary Williams (1913–2000).

Williams died in Bushey, Hertfordshire, England.

== Filmography ==
Year	Title	Role	Notes
1920	Inheritance	Tulliver	Film debut
1934	Princess Charming	Philip	Uncredited
1934	The Secret of the Loch	Judge	Uncredited
1934	The Admiral's Secret	Questa	
1935	Look Up and Laugh	Malpas	
1935	Scrooge	Undertaker	
1936	Captain Bill	Cheerful	
1936	Sweeney Todd	Stephen Oakley	
1936	The Crimes of Stephen Hawke	Joshua Trimble	
1936	The Beloved Vagabond	Undertaker	
1936	The Man Who Changed His Mind	Landlord	Uncredited
1937	Elephant Boy	Hunter	
1937	For Valour	Judge	Uncredited
1937	It's Never Too Late to Mend	Farmer Merton	
1937	Silver Blaze	Silas Brown	
1937	Keep Fit	Editor of the Gazette	Uncredited
1937	Boys Will Be Girls	George Luff	
1938	John Halifax	Abel Fletcher	
1938	The Challenge	Villager	Uncredited
1938	The Citadel	Old Thomas - The Trap Driver	Uncredited
1939	Stolen Life		Uncredited
1940	The Stars Look Down	Union Committee Chairman	Uncredited
1940	Pastor Hall		Uncredited
1941	The Ghost Train	Ben Isaacs	
1941	Penn of Pennsylvania	Lord Arlington	
1942	Back-Room Boy	McIntyre	Uncredited
1942	The Day Will Dawn	Petersen	Uncredited
1942	The Young Mr. Pitt	Minor Role	Uncredited
1942	The Great Mr. Handel	Leader Of Performance Wreckers	
1943	Tomorrow We Live	Boileau	Final film
