= A. R. Rawlinson =

British army officer and screenwriter (1894–1984)

A. R. Rawlinson OBE
- Born: Arthur Richard Rawlinson; 9 August 1894; London, England
- Died: 20 April 1984 (aged 89)
- Military career
- Allegiance: United Kingdom
- Branch: British Army
- Rank: Lieutenant-Colonel
- Nickname: "Dick"
- Service number: NA – 1919; 89652 – 1939-46
- Units: General List (WW1); York and Lancaster Regiment (WWI); Machine Gun Corps (WW1); Queen's Royal Regiment (WWII)
- Conflicts: World War I World War II
- Awards: Member of the Order of the British Empire (WW1); Officer of the Order of the British Empire (1945); Officer of the Legion of Merit (1947)

Lieutenant-Colonel Arthur Richard Rawlinson, OBE (9 August 1894 – 20 April 1984) was a British Army officer who served on the Western Front, and then in military intelligence in both World Wars. He served as head of MI.9a, and of MI.19. In peacetime, he developed a very successful career as a screenwriter and also produced several films.

== Early life ==
Rawlinson was born in London, England, on 9 August 1894, the son of barrister Thomas Arthur Rawlinson and Gertrude Hamilton, daughter of barrister William Melmoth Walters. The Rawlinsons were Hampshire landed gentry, Thomas Arthur Rawlinson being nephew of the judge Sir Christopher Rawlinson.

He was educated at Windlesham House School, Rugby School and Pembroke College, Cambridge.

== War service ==
Already a cadet in the Officer Training Corps, Rawlinson was commissioned on 1 September 1914 as a temporary second lieutenant in the war-raised 6th (Service) Battalion of The Queen's (Royal West Surrey Regiment). He was promoted to temporary lieutenant on 29 December 1914. After a year's service he obtained a regular commission with the York and Lancaster Regiment, serving again as a second lieutenant. On 26 June 1916, he was seconded to the newly formed Machine Gun Corps and promoted back to lieutenant on 21 December 1916. After he was wounded in action he began a career in Military Intelligence, 'employed at the War Office' in MI.1(a) as an acting major. He was awarded an MBE for his war service and resigned his commission on 27 February 1919.

On 14 April 1939, he transferred from the Reserve of Officers of the York and Lancaster Regiment to the Queen's Royal Regiment (West Surrey) and returned to active service. During World War II he served with the rank of major as the head of MI.9(a), a department of MI.9 responsible for vetting enemy prisoners of war. The department was later reconstituted as MI.19 in its own right. He retired from the service with the honorary rank of lieutenant colonel on 5 January 1946.

=== Honours and decorations ===
In the 1945 New Year Honours, the then Major (temporary Lieutenant-Colonel) Rawlinson was appointed an Officer of the Order of the British Empire (OBE), an advance on the recognition he had received after the previous war. On 23 May 1947, he was appointed Officer of the Legion of Merit "in recognition of distinguished services in the cause of the Allies".

== Personal life ==
Rawlinson married Alisa Margaret Harrington Grayson on 20 December 1916. She was the daughter of Sir Henry Grayson, Bt., the Conservative Member of Parliament for Birkenhead from 1918 to 1922. They had two sons: Michael Grayson Rawlinson (born 27 March 1918, died 1941 KIA), and Peter Anthony Grayson Rawlinson (born 26 June 1919, died 28 June 2006), who became the life-peer Lord Rawlinson of Ewell.

Rawlinson had a strong bond with the Grayson family. He was at Pembroke with Dennys Grayson, who served with the Irish Guards in Great War along with his brother, Rupert Grayson, and John Kipling, son of Rudyard Kipling. The shell that wounded Rupert Grayson in 1915 was the one that killed John Kipling. Dennys Grayson gave his son the distinctive name of Rudyard - as opposed to the unremarkable John - when the child was born the following year. Rawlinson married the sister of the Grayson brothers, Alisa, and the friends became family. Rudyard Kipling was keen to maintain contact with the young people who knew his beloved son, especially Rupert. It was through Rupert that Rawlinson was introduced to Kipling and was commissioned to write the screenplays to some of his works.

Rawlinson died 20 April 1984 in West Sussex, England.

== Partial filmography ==
- Leap Year (1932)
- The Blarney Stone (1933)
- A Cuckoo in the Nest (1933)
- Aunt Sally (1933)
- Menace (1934)
- The Man Who Knew Too Much (1934)
- Man of the Moment (1935)
- Lancashire Luck (1937)
- The Last Curtain (1937)
- Missing, Believed Married (1937)
- King Solomon's Mines (1937)
- Strange Boarders (1938)
- John Halifax (1938)
- Crackerjack (1938)
- The Face at the Window (1939)
- The Chinese Bungalow (1940)
- This England (1941)
- The White Unicorn (1947)
- Calling Paul Temple (1948)
- The Story of Shirley Yorke (1948)
- Meet Simon Cherry (1949)
- Celia (1949)
- Dark Secret (1949)
- There Was a Young Lady (1953)
- Gaolbreak (1962)

== Television ==
- Assignment Foreign Legion: "The Debt" by Rawlinson and Max Ehrlich (December 1956)
- The Diary of Samuel Pepys: writer (1958)
