= Philip Bawcombe =

Philip William Bawcombe, FRSA born in London in 1906 and died in 2000, was an industrial designer, inter alia for film studios, and official South African war artist during World War II, who also produced acclaimed collections of paintings illustrating the cities of Johannesburg and Kimberley, in South Africa, published as books in 1973 and 1976 respectively.

== Education ==
Bawcombe was born in London in 1906. He attended the Choir School of St Peter's, Eaton Square, and sang at both St Paul's Cathedral and Westminster Abbey. He completed his schooling at Framlingham College in Suffolk.

== A career in industrial and set design ==
Bawcombe was apprenticed to a firm of shopfitters before joining the design department of a London firm of interior decorators. He afterwards became a senior designer for ocean liner decorators.

From 1930 Bawcombe applied his skills to film sets joining the industrial art department of Gaumont-British Picture Corporation. Two years later he joined the nascent Sound Film Producing & Recording Studios, which later became Shepperton Studios, as resident art director.

Bawcombe was elected a Fellow of the Royal Society of Arts in 1938.

== War artist ==
Bawcombe went out to Southern Africa, first to Rhodesia (now Zimbabwe) and then South Africa just prior to the outbreak of World War II. He enlisted with the South African forces, serving initially in the Middle East where he was commissioned as second in command of a camouflage unit. He was responsible for designing dummy tanks constructed on the backs of military lorries as a decoy.

From 1941 to 1945 Bawcombe covered the North African and Italian Campaigns as official South African war artist. A collection of 50 of his war paintings is preserved at the Ditsong National Museum of Military History in Johannesburg.

== Later career ==
Bawcombe returned to South Africa after the war, working as painter and industrial designer. He served a term as president of the Natal Society of Arts, and held exhibitions in South Africa, Mozambique and Swaziland. A major commission was the design of villas on the Greek island of Skiathos, followed by a return to Britain as art director in the film industry.

Back in South Africa from 1968, art works for two books illustrating the historical townscapes of Johannesburg and Kimberley were amongst projects taken up in the early to mid-1970s. Philip Bawcombe’s Johannesburg appeared in 1973. H.F. Oppenheimer hailed Philip Bawcombe’s Kimberley (1976) as capturing “the spirit and portraying the fabric of old Kimberley,” announcing that De Beers had acquired the original collection for permanent display. For both books, Ted Scannel provided the text accompanying the images, while an historical introduction to the Kimberley book was given by Brian Roberts.

== Selected filmography ==
- John Halifax (1938)
