= Tod Slaughter =

English actor (1885–1956)

- Slaughter as Sweeney Todd in 1936
- Born: Norman Carter Slaughter; 19 March 1885; Gosforth, Newcastle upon Tyne, England
- Died: 19 February 1956 (aged 70); Derby, Derbyshire, England
- Other names: "Mr. Murder"; N. Carter Slaughter
- Occupation: Actor
- Years active: 1905–1956
- Spouse: Jenny Lynn (1912-his death)

Norman Carter Slaughter (19 March 1885 – 19 February 1956), also known as Tod Slaughter, was an English actor-manager, best known for playing over-the-top villains in macabre film adaptations of Victorian melodramas. Nicknamed "Mr. Murder", he has been cited as Britain's first horror film star.

== Early life ==
Slaughter was born on 19 March 1885 in Gosforth and attended the Royal Grammar School in Newcastle upon Tyne. The eldest surviving son of 12 children, he made his way onto the stage in 1905 at West Hartlepool. In 1913, he became a lessee of the Hippodrome theatres in the Richmond and Croydon areas of London. After a brief interruption to serve in the Royal Flying Corps during the First World War, he returned to the stage.

== Career ==
=== Early career ===
During Slaughter's early career, his stage name was "N. Carter Slaughter" and he primarily played the conventional leading man or character roles. After the war, he ran the Theatre Royal, Chatham before taking over the Elephant and Castle Theatre in London for a memorable few years from 1924 onwards that have since passed into British theatrical legend. His company revived Victorian "blood-and-thunder" melodramas such as Maria Marten, Sweeney Todd, Jack Sheppard, and The Silver King to enthusiastic audiences—not just locals but also sophisticated theatregoers from the West End who might have initially come for a cheap laugh but ended up enthralled by the power of the fare on offer. Slaughter also staged other types of production such as the annual Christmas pantomime, where he cast prominent local personalities in bit parts for audience recognition. Despite a local protest, the Elephant and Castle Theatre was closed down in 1927, after Slaughter's company vacated it several months earlier.

In September 1912 he married stage actress Jenny Lynn, who had been playing comedy leads in West End shows. They appeared on stage, screen, and radio for more than 10,000 performances over the next 30 years. "Even their engagement had the shadow of crime across it," remarked Picturegoer Weekly, "for Tod and his Jenny were playing in Lincoln at the time, and while they were taking a quiet stroll round the prison walls he proposed to her!" Slaughter kept a chicken farm just outside London during the 1930s but, according to his wife, "when he gets outside the studio he's so tender-hearted that he won't kill a chicken, even if it means going without his Sunday lunch."

It was in 1925 that he adopted the stage name "Tod Slaughter", but his primary roles were still character and heroic leads. He played the young hero in The Face at the Window, poacher Tom Robinson in It's Never Too Late To Mend, and village idiot Tim Winterbottom in Maria Marten. He also played the title character in The Return of Sherlock Holmes and D'Artagnan in The Three Musketeers. Silent footage exists of Slaughter acting on stage at the Elephant and Castle in the military melodrama The Flag Lieutenant, in a documentary entitled London After Dark.

In 1931 at the New Theatre, London he played Long John Silver in Treasure Island during the day, and body snatcher William Hare in The Crimes of Burke And Hare at night. Publicised as "Mr. Murder", he lapped up his new-found notoriety by boasting he committed 15 murders each day for the duration of the run. Shortly afterwards, he played the title character in Sweeney Todd, the Demon Barber of Fleet Street for the first of 2,000 times on stage. Actor and role had found each other much in the same way as Béla Lugosi and Dracula, and the seal was set on Slaughter's subsequent career.

=== Film career ===
In 1934, at age 49, Slaughter began in films. Usually cast as a villain, his first film was Maria Marten or Murder in the Red Barn (1935), a Victorian melodrama filmed cheaply with Slaughter as the obvious evildoer, and identified as such at the beginning of the play. In the old melodramatic style, each main member of the cast is introduced before the play begins and has his role explained. When Slaughter comes on, he favours the audience with a cold, evil grin as the on-stage announcer says "Squire Corder, Lord of the Manor...and a villain! Whose blood may be blue—but whose heart is black as night!" This set the general tone for the film series. Each film was usually preceded by a spoken or printed introduction explaining the faithful re-creation of a dated melodrama, and inviting the audience to enjoy it.

Slaughter's next film role was as Sweeney Todd in Sweeney Todd: The Demon Barber of Fleet Street (1936), directed and produced by George King, whose partnership with Slaughter was continued in the subsequent shockers: The Crimes of Stephen Hawke (1936); It's Never Too Late To Mend (1937); The Ticket of Leave Man (1938); The Face at the Window (1939) and Crimes at the Dark House (1940). Most of these films were "quota quickies", films made quickly and cheaply to fulfill a government requirement that a certain portion of all films distributed by British studios had to be British made. Many such were forgettable, low-quality films, but the lack of studio interest paradoxically guaranteed some degree of success: it gave the maker, by default, artistic control over the final product.

There were, however, some non-melodramatic and non-costume roles in his career. He was a supporting player in The Song of the Road (1937) and Darby and Joan (1937). In Sexton Blake and the Hooded Terror (1938), he played, in modern dress, the head of an international gang of supervillains.

=== Reception in America ===
Tod Slaughter's blood-and-thunder films were too British in theme, too old-fashioned and broadly played for mainstream American audiences, and thus they were not released in the United States by any of the major film companies. Instead they were handled by independent distributors in New York (usually Select Attractions or Arthur Ziehm, Inc.), and they did attract a specialized following among horror fans. Maria Marten, released in the United States as Murder in the Red Barn, was reviewed by Frank Nugent of The New York Times: "Tod Slaughter, the Corse Payton of London, is quite perfect as the ogling, lip-curling, 104 percent impure Squire. All [cast members] have been assembled at great expense -- as the gentleman in the prologue confides -- for your amusement. To make it really perfect, though, the World Cinema should install a bar and a hissing claque." On at least two occasions a Slaughter picture was paired with another British thriller for a "super-shocker" double feature, to cash in on the successful nationwide double bill of Universal's Dracula and Frankenstein.

Slaughter's especially florid The Face at the Window, released as a Halloween attraction in October 1940, seemed made to order for audiences to indulge their fondness for rip-roaring thrills. The trade paper Showmen's Trade Review advised, "If audiences will let themselves go, they'll have a good time viewing this old-fashioned meller. The characters seem to have a great time acting all over the place. Almost anyone who views this will have as good a time as the characters." Paul Mooney, Jr. of Motion Picture Herald agreed: "Unabashedly a melodrama of the 'unhand me villain, my heart is pledged to another' cliche this British production has much to recommend it -- the hero, villain, and the girl overact in an authentic reproduction of the melodrama circa 1880, and, in addition, it is a pretty good mystery." Motion Picture Daily summed it up: "A splendid horror film. The situations are highly implausible, of course, and the film will probably be met with cynical reaction by some audiences, but it is perfect entertainment for the addicts of screen terrorism."

== Later works ==
Slaughter was busy on stage during World War II, performing Jack the Ripper, Landru and Dr Jekyll and Mr Hyde. There were also one-act sketches such as The Touch of a Child.

After the war Slaughter resumed melodramatic roles on screen and starred in The Curse of the Wraydons (1946), in which Bruce Seton played the legendary Victorian bogeyman Spring-Heeled Jack, and The Greed of William Hart (1948) based on the murderous career of Burke and Hare. These were produced by Ambassador Films at Bushey Studios, which had made a healthy profit re-releasing Slaughter's 1930s films during the war years.

=== Last years ===
During the early 1950s Tod Slaughter still regularly toured the provinces and London suburbs, but the public's appetite for melodrama seemed to have abated somewhat by this stage and he was declared bankrupt in 1953, owing to a downturn in his touring income. He continued to act in stage productions, such as Molière's The Gay Invalid opposite future horror star Peter Cushing, and acting as master of ceremonies at an evening of old-fashioned music hall entertainment.

Slaughter appeared as villain Terence Reilly in the seven-part television series Inspector Morley: Late of Scotland Yard, starring Patrick Barr, Dorothy Bramhall, and Tucker McGuire. The episodes were re-edited into two theatrical motion pictures, King of the Underworld (1952) and Murder at Scotland Yard (1953). A version of Spring-Heeled Jack starring Slaughter, was one of the first live TV plays mounted by the BBC.

He was guest on the BBC radio programme Desert Island Discs on 24 March 1955.

== Death ==
On 19 February 1956, at the age of 70, Slaughter died of coronary thrombosis in Derby. After his death, which followed a performance of Maria Marten, his work slipped almost completely into obscurity. Film historians have revived interest in Slaughter's cycle of melodramatic films, placing them in a tradition of "cinema of excess", which also includes the Gainsborough melodramas and Hammer Horrors.

== Filmography ==
Year	Title	Role
1935	Maria Marten, or The Murder in the Red Barn	William Corder
1936	Sweeney Todd: The Demon Barber of Fleet Street	Sweeney Todd
1936	The Crimes of Stephen Hawke	Stephen Hawke
1937	Darby and Joan	Mr. Templeton
1937	It's Never Too Late to Mend	Squire John Meadows
1937	The Song of the Road	Dan Lorenzo
1938	The Ticket of Leave Man	The Tiger
1938	Sexton Blake and the Hooded Terror	Michael Larron
1939	The Face at the Window	Chevalier Lucio del Gardo
1940	Crimes at the Dark House	The False Percival Glyde
1945	Bothered by a Beard	Sweeney Todd
1946	The Curse of the Wraydons	Philip Wraydon (The Chief)
1948	The Greed of William Hart	William Hart
1952	King of the Underworld	Terence Reilly
1952	Murder at Scotland Yard	Terence Reilly
1952	Murder at the Grange	Patrick Reilly / Clarence Beacham
1952	A Ghost for Sale	Caretaker
1954	Puzzle Corner No. 14	Sweeney Todd

== Bibliography ==
- Richards, Jeffrey (ed.) The Unknown 1930s: An Alternative History of the British Cinema, 1929–1939. I.B. Tauris, 1998.
