= List of British films of 1934 =

British films released in 1934

The following British films were released in 1934.

== A-L ==
Title	Director	Cast	Genre	Notes
The Admiral's Secret	Guy Newall	Edmund Gwenn, James Raglan, Aubrey Mather	Comedy	
Anything Might Happen	George A. Cooper	John Garrick, Judy Kelly, Martin Walker	Crime	
Are You a Mason?	Henry Edwards	Sonnie Hale, Robertson Hare, Davy Burnaby	Comedy	
Autumn Crocus	Basil Dean	Ivor Novello, Fay Compton, Jack Hawkins	Drama	
Badger's Green	Adrian Brunel	Valerie Hobson, Bruce Lester, David Horne	Comedy	
The Battle	Nicolas Farkas, Victor Tourjansky	Charles Boyer, Merle Oberon, John Loder	War drama	Co-production with France
Bella Donna	Robert Milton	Conrad Veidt, Mary Ellis, Cedric Hardwicke	Drama	
Big Business	Cyril Gardner	Claude Hulbert, Eve Gray, Ernest Sefton	Comedy	
The Black Abbot	George A. Cooper	Richard Cooper, Judy Kelly, John Stuart	Thriller	
Blind Justice	Bernard Vorhaus	Eva Moore, Frank Vosper, Geraldine Fitzgerald	Thriller	
Blossom Time	Paul L. Stein	Richard Tauber, Jane Baxter, Carl Esmond	Musical	
The Blue Squadron	George King	Esmond Knight, John Stuart, Cecil Parker	Drama	
Boomerang	Arthur Maude	Lester Matthews, Nora Swinburne, Harvey Braban	Drama	
Boots! Boots!	Bert Tracy	George Formby, Beryl Formby, Betty Driver	Comedy	
Borrowed Clothes	Arthur Maude	Anne Grey, Lester Matthews, Sunday Wilshin	Drama	
Brides to Be	Reginald Denham	Betty Stockfeld, Constance Shotter, Ronald Ward	Comedy	
The Broken Melody	Bernard Vorhaus	John Garrick, Merle Oberon, Margot Grahame	Drama	
The Broken Rosary	Harry Hughes	Derek Oldham, Vesta Victoria, Marjorie Corbett	Musical	
By-pass to Happiness	Anthony Kimmins	Tamara Desni, Maurice Evans, Kay Hammond	Romance	
The Camels Are Coming	Tim Whelan	Jack Hulbert, Anna Lee, Peter Gawthorne	Action comedy	
The Case for the Crown	George A. Cooper	Miles Mander, Meriel Forbes, David Horne	Crime	
Catherine the Great	Paul Czinner	Elisabeth Bergner, Douglas Fairbanks Jr., Flora Robson	Historical drama	
Chu Chin Chow	Walter Forde	George Robey, Fritz Kortner, Anna May Wong	Musical	
The Church Mouse	Monty Banks	Laura La Plante, Ian Hunter, Edward Chapman	Comedy	
Colonel Blood	W. P. Lipscomb	Frank Cellier, Anne Grey, Mary Lawson	Historical drama	
Crazy People	Leslie S. Hiscott	Henry Kendall, Nancy O'Neil, Kenneth Kove	Comedy	
The Crimson Candle	Bernard Mainwaring	Eve Gray, Eliot Makeham, Kenneth Kove	Crime	
The Crucifix	G. B. Samuelson	Nancy Price, Sydney Fairbrother, Farren Soutar	Drama	
A Cup of Kindness	Tom Walls	Tom Walls, Ralph Lynn, Robertson Hare	Comedy	
Dangerous Ground	Norman Walker	Malcolm Keen, Jack Raine, Joyce Kennedy	Crime	
Danny Boy	Oswald Mitchell	Archie Pitt, Dorothy Dickson, Fred Duprez	Musical	
Death at Broadcasting House	Reginald Denham	Ian Hunter, Austin Trevor, Henry Kendall	Mystery	
Designing Women	Ivar Campbell	Stewart Rome, Valerie Taylor, Tyrell Davis	Drama	
The Diplomatic Lover	Anthony Kimmins	Harold French, Tamara Desni, Davy Burnaby	Musical	
Dirty Work	Tom Walls	Ralph Lynn, Gordon Harker, Robertson Hare	Comedy	
Doctor's Orders	Norman Lee	Leslie Fuller, John Mills, Marguerite Allan	Comedy	
The Double Event	Leslie Howard Gordon	Anne Grey, Tom Helmore, Bernard Lee	Crime	
Easy Money	Redd Davis	Lilian Oldland, Gerald Rawlinson, George Carney	Comedy	
Evensong	Victor Saville	Evelyn Laye, Fritz Kortner, Emlyn Williams	Musical	
Evergreen	Victor Saville	Jessie Matthews, Sonnie Hale, Betty Balfour	Musical	
Faces	Sidney Morgan	Anna Lee, Harold French, Moore Marriott	Drama	
Father and Son	Monty Banks	Edmund Gwenn, Esmond Knight, Roland Culver	Crime	
The Feathered Serpent	Maclean Rogers	Enid Stamp-Taylor, Tom Helmore, Moore Marriott	Thriller	
The Fire Raisers	Michael Powell	Leslie Banks, Anne Grey, Carol Goodner	Drama	
Flat No. 3	Leslie S. Hiscott	Mary Glynne, Betty Astell, Cecil Parker	Crime	
Flood Tide	John Baxter	George Carney, Janice Adair, Peggy Novak	Drama	
Forbidden Territory	Phil Rosen	Gregory Ratoff, Binnie Barnes, Tamara Desni	Thriller	
The Four Masked Men	George Pearson	John Stuart, Judy Kelly, Miles Mander	Crime	
Freedom of the Seas	Marcel Varnel	Clifford Mollison, Wendy Barrie, Zelma O'Neal	War	
Gay Love	Leslie S. Hiscott	Florence Desmond, Sophie Tucker, Garry Marsh	Musical	
Get Your Man	George King	Dorothy Boyd, Sebastian Shaw, Kay Walsh	Comedy	
The Girl in the Flat	Redd Davis	Stewart Rome, Belle Chrystall, John Turnbull	Crime	
The Girl in Possession	Monty Banks	Laura La Plante, Henry Kendall, Claude Hulbert	Comedy	
Girls, Please!	Jack Raymond	Sydney Howard, Jane Baxter, Meriel Forbes	Comedy	
Girls Will Be Boys	Marcel Varnel	Dolly Haas, Cyril Maude, Esmond Knight	Comedy	
Give Her a Ring	Arthur B. Woods	Wendy Barrie, Clifford Mollison, Zelma O'Neal	Musical	
A Glimpse of Paradise	Ralph Ince	George Carney, Eve Lister, Wally Patch	Crime	
Grand Prix	St. John Legh Clowes	John Stuart, Peter Gawthorne, Milton Rosmer	Sports	
The Great Defender	Thomas Bentley	Matheson Lang, Margaret Bannerman, Arthur Margetson	Mystery	
The Green Pack	T. Hayes Hunter	John Stuart, Aileen Marson, Garry Marsh	Drama	
Guest of Honour	George King	Henry Kendall, Miki Hood, Edward Chapman	Comedy	
Hyde Park	Randall Faye	George Carney, Eve Lister, Wallace Lupino	Comedy	
I Spy	Allan Dwan	Sally Eilers, Ben Lyon, Harry Tate	Drama	
Important People	Adrian Brunel	Stewart Rome, Dorothy Boyd, Jack Raine	Comedy	
Irish Hearts	Brian Desmond Hurst	Lester Matthews, Nancy Burne, Patric Knowles	Drama	
The Iron Duke	Victor Saville	George Arliss, Ellaline Terriss, Gladys Cooper	Historical	
It's a Cop	Maclean Rogers	Sydney Howard, Chili Bouchier, Garry Marsh	Comedy	
Jack Ahoy	Walter Forde	Jack Hulbert, Nancy O'Neil, Alfred Drayton	Comedy	
Java Head	Thorold Dickinson, J. Walter Ruben	Anna May Wong, Elizabeth Allan, Ralph Richardson	Drama	
Jew Süss	Lothar Mendes	Conrad Veidt, Benita Hume, Cedric Hardwicke	Drama	
Josser on the Farm	T. Hayes Hunter	Ernie Lotinga, Betty Astell, Garry Marsh	Comedy	
Keep It Quiet	Leslie S. Hiscott	Frank Pettingell, Jane Carr, Cyril Raymond	Comedy	
Kentucky Minstrels	John Baxter	Eddie Whaley, Polly Ward, Roddy Hughes	Musical	
The King of Paris	Jack Raymond	Cedric Hardwicke, Marie Glory, Ralph Richardson	Drama	
Lady in Danger	Tom Walls	Tom Walls, Yvonne Arnaud, Anne Grey	Comedy	
The Lady is Willing	Gilbert Miller	Leslie Howard, Binnie Barnes, Cedric Hardwicke	Comedy	Remake of 1942 film
The Lash	Henry Edwards	Lyn Harding, John Mills, Joan Maude	Drama	
Leave It to Blanche	Harold Young	Henry Kendall, Rex Harrison, Olive Blakeney	Comedy	
Lest We Forget	John Baxter	Stewart Rome, George Carney, Esmond Knight	Drama	
The Life of the Party	Ralph Dawson	Jerry Verno, Betty Astell, Kenneth Kove	Comedy	
Lilies of the Field	Norman Walker	Winifred Shotter, Ellis Jeffreys, Anthony Bushell	Romantic comedy	
Lily of Kilarney	Maurice Elvey	Stanley Holloway, John Garrick, Gina Malo	Comedy	
Little Friend	Berthold Viertel	Matheson Lang, Lydia Sherwood, Nova Pilbeam	Drama	
Little Stranger	George King	Nigel Playfair, Eva Moore, Norah Baring	Drama	
Lord Edgware Dies	Henry Edwards	Austin Trevor, Richard Cooper, Jane Carr	Mystery	
Lorna Doone	Basil Dean	Victoria Hopper, John Loder, Margaret Lockwood	Adventure	
Lost in the Legion	Fred Newmeyer	Leslie Fuller, Hal Gordon, Renée Houston	Comedy	
Love at Second Sight	Paul Merzbach	Marian Marsh, Claude Hulbert, Anthony Bushell	Comedy	
Love, Life and Laughter	Maurice Elvey	Gracie Fields, John Loder, Fred Duprez	Comedy	
The Luck of a Sailor	Robert Milton	Greta Nissen, David Manners, Clifford Mollison	Comedy	
Lucky Loser	Reginald Denham	Richard Dolman, Aileen Marson, Anna Lee	Comedy	

== M-Z ==
Title	Director	Cast	Genre	Notes
The Man I Want	Leslie S. Hiscott	Henry Kendall, Wendy Barrie, Betty Astell	Comedy	
The Man Who Changed His Name	Henry Edwards	Lyn Harding, Betty Stockfeld, Leslie Perrins	Crime	
The Man Who Knew Too Much	Alfred Hitchcock	Leslie Banks, Edna Best, Peter Lorre	Spy thriller	
Master and Man	John Harlow	Wallace Lupino, Barry Lupino, Faith Bennett	Comedy	
Menace	Adrian Brunel	Victor Varconi, Joan Maude, D. A. Clarke-Smith	Crime	
Mister Cinders	Frederic Zelnik	Clifford Mollison, Zelma O'Neal, Edmund Breon	Musical	
Mr Stringfellow Says No	Randall Faye	Neil Hamilton, Claude Dampier, Kathleen Gibson	Thriller	
Money Mad	Frank Richardson	Virginia Cherrill, Garry Marsh, Peter Gawthorne	Drama	
Murder at the Inn	George King	Wendy Barrie, Harold French, Jane Carr	Crime	
Murder at Monte Carlo	Ralph Ince	Errol Flynn, Eve Gray, Molly Lamont	Crime	
Music Hall	John Baxter	George Carney, Ben Field, Helena Pickard	Musical	
My Old Dutch	Sinclair Hill	Betty Balfour, Gordon Harker, Michael Hogan	Drama	
My Song for You	Maurice Elvey	Jan Kiepura, Sonnie Hale, Aileen Marson	Musical	
My Song Goes Round the World	Richard Oswald	Joseph Schmidt, John Loder, Charlotte Ander	Musical	
Nell Gwyn	Herbert Wilcox	Anna Neagle, Cedric Hardwicke, Jeanne de Casalis	Historical	
The Night Club Queen	Bernard Vorhaus	Mary Clare, Jane Carr, Lewis Shaw	Musical mystery	
Nine Forty-Five	George King	Binnie Barnes, Donald Calthrop, James Finlayson	Crime	
No Escape	Ralph Ince	Ian Hunter, Binnie Barnes, Molly Lamont	Drama	
Oh No Doctor!	George King	Jack Hobbs, Dorothy Boyd, James Finlayson	Comedy	
The Old Curiosity Shop	Thomas Bentley	Ben Webster, Hay Petrie, Polly Ward	Period drama	
On the Air	Herbert Smith	Davy Burnaby, Reginald Purdell, Betty Astell	Musical	
Open All Night	George Pearson	Frank Vosper, Margaret Vines, Gillian Lind	Drama	
The Outcast	Norman Lee	Leslie Fuller, Mary Glynne, Hal Gordon	Comedy	
Over the Garden Wall	John Daumery	Bobby Howes, Marian Marsh, Margaret Bannerman	Musical comedy	
Passing Shadows	Leslie S. Hiscott	Edmund Gwenn, Barry MacKay, Aileen Marson	Mystery	
The Path of Glory	Dallas Bower	Maurice Evans, Valerie Hobson, Henry Daniell	Comedy	
The Perfect Flaw	Manning Haynes	Ralph Truman, Wally Patch, Romilly Lunge	Crime	
A Political Party	Norman Lee	Leslie Fuller, John Mills, Moore Marriott	Comedy	
The Primrose Path	Reginald Denham	Isobel Elsom, Max Adrian, Virginia Field	Romance	
Princess Charming	Maurice Elvey	Evelyn Laye, Henry Wilcoxon, Yvonne Arnaud	Musical	
The Private Life of Don Juan	Alexander Korda	Douglas Fairbanks, Merle Oberon, Benita Hume	Comedy drama	
The Queen's Affair	Herbert Wilcox	Anna Neagle, Fernand Gravey, Miles Malleson	Musical	
Radio Parade of 1935	Arthur B. Woods	Will Hay, Helen Chandler, Clifford Mollison	Drama	
Red Ensign	Michael Powell	Leslie Banks, Carol Goodner, Frank Vosper	Drama	
The Return of Bulldog Drummond	Walter Summers	Ralph Richardson, Ann Todd, Claud Allister	Thriller	
The River Wolves	George Pearson	John Mills, Michael Hogan, Ben Welden	Crime	
Road House	Maurice Elvey	Violet Loraine, Gordon Harker, Aileen Marson	Musical	
Rolling in Money	Albert Parker	Isabel Jeans, Leslie Sarony, John Loder	Comedy	
Romance in Rhythm	Lawrence Huntington	Queenie Leonard, David Hutcheson, Carroll Gibbons	Mystery	
Say It with Flowers	John Baxter	Mary Clare, Ben Field, George Carney	Musical	
The Scarlet Pimpernel	Harold Young	Leslie Howard, Merle Oberon, Raymond Massey	Adventure	
The Scoop	Maclean Rogers	Anne Grey, Tom Helmore, Wally Patch	Crime	
The Scotland Yard Mystery	Thomas Bentley	Gerald du Maurier, George Curzon, Grete Natzler	Crime	
The Secret of the Loch	Milton Rosmer	Seymour Hicks, Nancy O'Neil, Gibson Gowland	Adventure	
Seeing Is Believing	Redd Davis	William Hartnell, Gus McNaughton, Faith Bennett	Comedy	
Sing As We Go	Basil Dean	Gracie Fields, John Loder, Stanley Holloway	Comedy	
Something Always Happens	Michael Powell	Ian Hunter, Nancy O'Neil, Peter Gawthorne	Drama	
Sometimes Good	W.P. Kellino	Henry Kendall, Nancy O'Neil, Hal Gordon	Comedy	
Song at Eventide	Harry Hughes	Fay Compton, Lester Matthews, Nancy Burne	Musical	
Sorrell and Son	Jack Raymond	H. B. Warner, Margot Grahame, Hugh Williams	Drama	
Spring in the Air	Victor Hanbury, Norman Lee	Edmund Gwenn, Zelma O'Neal, Lydia Sherwood	Comedy	
Swinging the Lead	David MacKane	William Hartnell, Moira Lynd, Gibb McLaughlin	Comedy	
Tangled Evidence	George A. Cooper	Sam Livesey, Joan Marion, Michael Hogan	Crime	
The Tell-Tale Heart	Brian Desmond Hurst	Norman Dryden, John Kelt, Yolande Terrell	Drama	
Temptation	Max Neufeld	Frances Day, Stewart Rome, Peggy Simpson	Musical	
There Goes Susie	Victor Hanbury, John Stafford	Gene Gerrard, Wendy Barrie, Zelma O'Neal	Comedy	
The Third Clue	Albert Parker	Basil Sydney, Molly Lamont, Raymond Lovell	Crime	
Those Were the Days	Thomas Bentley	Will Hay, Iris Hoey, John Mills, Claud Allister	Comedy	
Tiger Bay	J. Elder Wills	Anna May Wong, Henry Victor, Rene Ray	Crime	
To Be a Lady	George King	Chili Bouchier, Bruce Lester, Vera Bogetti	Drama	
Too Many Millions	Harold Young	Betty Compton, John Garrick, Viola Keats	Drama	
Two Hearts in Waltz Time	Carmine Gallone, Joe May	Carl Brisson, Frances Day, Oscar Asche	Musical	
Unfinished Symphony	Anthony Asquith	Mártha Eggerth, Helen Chandler, Hans Jaray	Musical drama	
The Unholy Quest	Widgey R. Newman	Claude Bailey, Terence de Marney, Harry Terry	Horror	
Virginia's Husband	Maclean Rogers	Dorothy Boyd, Reginald Gardiner, Enid Stamp Taylor	Comedy	
Waltzes from Vienna	Alfred Hitchcock	Esmond Knight, Jessie Matthews, Edmund Gwenn	Musical	
Warn London	T. Hayes Hunter	Edmund Gwenn, John Loder, Leonora Corbett	Thriller	
The Warren Case	Walter Summers	Richard Bird, Nancy Burne, Diana Napier	Mystery	
The Way of Youth	Norman Walker	Irene Vanbrugh, Aileen Marson, Sebastian Shaw	Crime	
What Happened Then?	Walter Summers	Richard Bird, Francis L. Sullivan, George Zucco	Crime	
What Happened to Harkness?	Milton Rosmer	James Finlayson, Brember Wills, John Turnbull	Comedy	
What's in a Name?	Ralph Ince	Carol Goodner, Reginald Purdell, Eve Gray	Comedy	
Whispering Tongues	George Pearson	Reginald Tate, Jane Welsh, Malcolm Keen	Crime	
White Ensign	John Hunt	Anthony Kimmins, Molly Lamont, Ballard Berkeley	Adventure	
Wild Boy	Albert de Courville	Bud Flanagan, Chesney Allen, Sonnie Hale	Comedy	
Without You	John Daumery	Henry Kendall, Wendy Barrie, Margot Grahame	Comedy	
Womanhood	Harry Hughes	Eve Gray, Leslie Perrins, Esmond Knight	Drama	
Youthful Folly	Miles Mander	Irene Vanbrugh, Jane Carr, Mary Lawson	Drama	

== Documentary ==
Title	Director	Cast	Genre	Notes
Man of Aran	Robert J. Flaherty		Documentary	
The Song of Ceylon	Basil Wright		Documentary	

== See also ==
- 1934 in British music
- 1934 in British television
- 1934 in the United Kingdom
