= List of British films of 1932 =

British films of 1932

A list of British films released in 1932.

== A-K ==
Title	Director	Cast	Genre	Notes
Above Rubies	Frank A. Richardson	Zoe Palmer, Robin Irvine, Tom Helmore	Comedy	
After Dark	Albert Parker	Horace Hodges, Hugh Williams, George Barraud	Comedy	
After Office Hours	Thomas Bentley	Viola Lyel, Heather Angel, Frank Lawton	Romantic drama	
After the Ball	Milton Rosmer	Esther Ralston, Basil Rathbone, Marie Burke	Comedy	Co-production with the United States
Aren't We All?	Harry Lachman	Gertrude Lawrence, Owen Nares, Hugh Wakefield	Comedy	
Bachelor's Baby	Harry Hughes	William Freshman, Henry Wenman, Alma Taylor	Comedy	
Baroud	Rex Ingram	Rex Ingram, Arabella Fields, Dennis Hoey	Romantic adventure	Co-production with France
The Barton Mystery	Henry Edwards	Ursula Jeans, Lyn Harding, Wendy Barrie	Crime	
Betrayal	Reginald Fogwell	Stewart Rome, Marjorie Hume, Leslie Perrins	Crime drama	
Blind Spot	John Daumery	Muriel Angelus, Percy Marmont, Warwick Ward	Drama	
The Blue Danube	Herbert Wilcox	Brigitte Helm, Joseph Schildkraut, Dorothy Bouchier	Musical romance	
Brother Alfred	Henry Edwards	Gene Gerrard, Molly Lamont, Elsie Randolph	Comedy	
C.O.D.	Michael Powell	Garry Marsh, Peter Gawthorne, Sybil Grove	Crime drama	
The Call Box Mystery	G.B. Samuelson	Warwick Ward, Harold French, Wendy Barrie	Thriller	
Castle Sinister	Widgey R. Newman	Haddon Mason, Wally Patch, Isla Kilpatrick	Horror	
The Chinese Puzzle	Guy Newall	Leon M. Lion, Elizabeth Allan, Austin Trevor	Crime drama	
Collision	G.B. Samuelson	Sunday Wilshin, Henrietta Watson, Irene Rooke	Crime	
Come Into My Parlour	John Longden	Pat Aherne, Renée Houston, Hal Walters	Crime	
Condemned to Death	Walter Forde	Arthur Wontner, Gordon Harker, Gillian Lind	Crime	
The Crooked Lady	Leslie S. Hiscott	Ursula Jeans, Isobel Elsom , Austin Trevor	Crime	
Dance Pretty Lady	Anthony Asquith	Ann Casson, Carl Harbord, Moore Marriott	Romantic drama	
Diamond Cut Diamond	Fred Niblo, Maurice Elvey	Adolphe Menjou, Benita Hume, Claud Allister	Crime comedy	
Don't Be a Dummy	Frank Richardson	Georgie Harris, Garry Marsh, Muriel Angelus	Comedy	
Double Dealing	Leslie S. Hiscott	Frank Pettingell, Richard Cooper, Zoe Palmer	Comedy	
Down Our Street	Harry Lachman	Elizabeth Allan, Hugh Williams, Binnie Barnes	Romantic Drama	
Ebb Tide	Arthur Rosson	Dorothy Bouchier, George Barraud, Joan Barry	Drama	
The Face at the Window	Leslie S. Hiscott	Raymond Massey, Isla Bevan, Claude Hulbert	Crime	
The Faithful Heart	Victor Saville	Herbert Marshall, Edna Best, Anne Grey	Romantic drama	
The First Mrs. Fraser	Sinclair Hill	Joan Barry, Henry Ainley, Harold Huth	Romantic drama	
The Flag Lieutenant	Henry Edwards	Henry Edwards, Anna Neagle, Peter Gawthorne	War	
Flat No. 9	Frank Richardson	Jane Baxter, Reginald Gardiner, Arthur Margetson	Comedy drama	
The Flying Squad	F.W. Kraemer	Harold Huth, Carol Goodner, Henry Wilcoxon	Crime	
Frail Women	Maurice Elvey	Mary Newcomb, Owen Nares, Margaret Vines	Drama	
The Frightened Lady	T. Hayes Hunter	Emlyn Williams, Cathleen Nesbitt, Gordon Harker	Thriller	
Goodnight, Vienna	Herbert Wilcox	Jack Buchanan, Anna Neagle, Gina Malo	Musical romance	
Help Yourself	Jean Daumery	Benita Hume, Martin Walker, Kenneth Kove	Comedy	
Her First Affaire	Allan Dwan	Ida Lupino, George Curzon, Diana Napier	Drama	
Her Night Out	William C. McGann	Dorothy Bartlam, Lester Matthews, Joan Marion	Comedy	
Here's George	Redd Davis	Pat Paterson, Syd Crossley, Merle Tottenham	Comedy	
Heroes of the Mine	Widgey R. Newman	Moore Marriott, Wally Patch, Terence de Marney	Drama	
High Society	John Rawlins	Florence Desmond, William Austin, Joan Wyndham	Comedy	
His Lordship	Michael Powell	Jerry Verno, Polly Ward, Peter Gawthorne	Musical comedy	
His Wife's Mother	Harry Hughes	Jerry Verno, Molly Lamont, Jack Hobbs	Comedy	
Holiday Lovers	Jack Harrison	Margery Pickard, George Vollaire	Romance	
Hotel Splendide	Michael Powell	Jerry Verno, Anthony Holles, Edgar Norfolk	Crime comedy	
Illegal	William C. McGann	Isobel Elsom, Ivor Barnard, Margot Grahame	Drama	
The Impassive Footman	Basil Dean	Owen Nares, Betty Stockfeld, Allan Jeayes	Drama	
In a Monastery Garden	Maurice Elvey	John Stuart, Hugh Williams, Alan Napier	Drama	
The Indiscretions of Eve	Cecil Lewis	Steffi Duna, Fred Conyngham, Lester Matthews	Musical comedy	
The Innocents of Chicago	Lupino Lane	Henry Kendall, Margot Grahame, Binnie Barnes	Comedy	
Insult	Harry Lachman	Elizabeth Allan, John Gielgud, Hugh Williams	Drama	
Jack's the Boy	Walter Forde	Jack Hulbert, Cicely Courtneidge, Winifred Shotter	Comedy	
Josser in the Army	Norman Lee	Ernie Lotinga, Hal Gordon, Jack Hobbs	Comedy	
Josser Joins the Navy	Norman Lee	Ernie Lotinga, Cyril McLaglen, Jack Hobbs	Comedy	
Josser on the River	Norman Lee	Ernie Lotinga, Molly Lamont, Reginald Gardiner	Comedy	
Keepers of Youth	Thomas Bentley	Garry Marsh, Ann Todd, Robin Irvine	Drama	

== L-Z ==
Title	Director	Cast	Genre	Notes
The Last Coupon	Frank Launder	Leslie Fuller, Mary Jerrold, Molly Lamont	Comedy	
Leap Year	Tom Walls	Tom Walls, Anne Grey, Edmund Breon	Comedy	
Let Me Explain, Dear	Gene Gerrard, Frank Miller	Gene Gerrard, Claude Hulbert, Viola Lyel	Comedy	
Life Goes On	Jack Raymond	Elsie Randolph, Betty Stockfeld, Warwick Ward	Crime	
Lily Christine	Paul L. Stein	Corinne Griffith, Colin Clive, Miles Mander	Drama	
Little Waitress	Widgey R. Newman	Claude Bailey, Moore Marriott, Ian Wilson	Musical	
The Lodger	Maurice Elvey	Ivor Novello, Elizabeth Allan, Jack Hawkins	Thriller	
Looking on the Bright Side	Graham Cutts, Basil Dean	Gracie Fields, Richard Dolman, Julian Rose	Comedy	
Lord Babs	Walter Forde	Bobby Howes, Jean Colin, Alfred Drayton	Comedy	
Lord Camber's Ladies	Benn W. Levy	Gerald du Maurier, Gertrude Lawrence, Benita Hume	Drama	
The Love Contract	Herbert Selpin	Winifred Shotter, Owen Nares, Sunday Wilshin	Musical	
Love on the Spot	Graham Cutts	Rosemary Ames, Richard Dolman, Aubrey Mather	Musical	
Love on Wheels	Victor Saville	Jack Hulbert, Leonora Corbett, Gordon Harker	Musical comedy	
Lucky Girl	Gene Gerrard, Frank Miller	Gene Gerrard, Molly Lamont, Gus McNaughton	Musical comedy	
Lucky Ladies	John Rawlins	Sydney Fairbrother, Emily Fitzroy, Syd Crossley	Comedy	
A Lucky Sweep	A. V. Bramble	John Longden, Diana Beaumont, Marie Wright	Comedy	
The Maid of the Mountains	Lupino Lane	Betty Stockfeld, Harry Welchman, Albert Burdon	Musical	
The Marriage Bond	Maurice Elvey	Mary Newcomb, Guy Newall, Stewart Rome	Drama	
Marry Me	Wilhelm Thiele	Renate Müller, Ian Hunter, George Robey	Comedy	
The Mayor's Nest	Maclean Rogers	Sydney Howard, Claude Hulbert, Al Bowlly	Comedy	
Men Like These	Walter Summers	Sydney Seaward, Syd Crossley, Lesley Wareing	Drama	
Men of Steel	George King	John Stuart, Benita Hume, Heather Angel	Drama	
Men of Tomorrow	Zoltan Korda	Emlyn Williams, Robert Donat, Merle Oberon	Romance	
The Midshipmaid	Albert de Courville	Jessie Matthews, Basil Sydney, Nigel Bruce	Comedy	
The Missing Rembrandt	Leslie S. Hiscott	Arthur Wontner, Jane Welsh, Miles Mander	Crime/Thriller	
Money for Nothing	Monty Banks	Seymour Hicks, Betty Stockfeld, Edmund Gwenn	Comedy	
Money Means Nothing	Herbert Wilcox	John Loder, Kay Hammond, Gibb McLaughlin	Comedy	
Money Talks	Norman Lee	Kid Berg, Judy Kelly, Griffith Jones	Comedy	
Mr. Bill the Conqueror	Norman Walker	Henry Kendall, Heather Angel, Nora Swinburne	Romantic drama	
Murder at Covent Garden	Leslie S. Hiscott	Dennis Neilson-Terry, Anne Grey, Walter Fitzgerald	Crime/Thriller	
Murder on the Second Floor	William C. McGann	Pat Paterson, John Longden, Florence Desmond	Thriller	
My Friend the King	Michael Powell	Jerry Verno, Luli Deste, Harold Saxon-Snell	Comedy	
The New Hotel	Bernard Mainwaring	Hal Gordon, Mickey Brantford, Dan Young	Musical	
A Night Like This	Tom Walls	Ralph Lynn, Winifred Shotter, Robertson Hare	Comedy	
Nine till Six	Basil Dean	Florence Desmond, Elizabeth Allan, Louise Hampton	Romantic drama	
Number Seventeen	Alfred Hitchcock	John Stuart, Anne Grey, Leon M. Lion	Crime	
Old Spanish Customers	Lupino Lane	Leslie Fuller, Binnie Barnes, Hal Gordon	Comedy	
Once Bitten	Leslie S. Hiscott	Ursula Jeans, Richard Cooper, Jeanne Stuart	Comedy	
The Return of Raffles	Mansfield Markham	George Barraud, Camilla Horn, Claud Allister	Crime	
Reunion	Ivar Campbell	Stewart Rome, Anthony Holles, Robert Dudley	Drama	
The Right to Live	Albert Parker	Davy Burnaby, Pat Paterson, Francis L. Sullivan	Crime	
The River House Ghost	Frank Richardson	Florence Desmond, Hal Walters, Joan Marion	Comedy	
Rome Express	Walter Forde	Conrad Veidt, Gordon Harker, Esther Ralston	Crime/Thriller	
A Safe Affair	Herbert Wynne	Franklin Dyall, Jeanne Stuart, Connie Emerald	Crime	
A Safe Proposition	Leslie S. Hiscott	A.W. Baskcomb, Barbara Gott, Harold French	Comedy	
Sally Bishop	T. Hayes Hunter	Joan Barry, Harold Huth, Benita Hume	Romance	
Say It with Music	Jack Raymond	Jack Payne, Percy Marmont, Evelyn Roberts	Musical	
Self Made Lady	George King	Heather Angel, Henry Wilcoxon, Louis Hayward	Romantic drama	
Service for Ladies	Alexander Korda	Leslie Howard, Elizabeth Allan, Benita Hume	Comedy	
The Sign of Four	Graham Cutts	Arthur Wontner, Isla Bevan, Ian Hunter	Crime	
The Silver Greyhound	William C. McGann	Percy Marmont, Anthony Bushell, Janice Adair	Crime	
Sleepless Nights	Thomas Bentley	Stanley Lupino, Frederick Lloyd, Gerald Rawlinson	Musical	
Stamboul	Dimitri Buchowetzki	Warwick Ward, Rosita Moreno, Margot Grahame	Drama	
The Star Reporter	Michael Powell	Harold French, Garry Marsh, Isla Bevan	Crime	
The Strangler	Norman Lee	Moira Lynd, Hal Gordon, Molly Lamont	Crime	
Tell Me Tonight	Anatole Litvak	Jan Kiepura, Sonnie Hale, Magda Schneider	Comedy	
Thark	Tom Walls	Tom Walls, Ralph Lynn, Robertson Hare	Comedy	
That Night in London	Rowland V. Lee	Robert Donat, Pearl Argyle, Miles Mander	Crime	
There Goes The Bride	Albert de Courville	Jessie Matthews, Owen Nares, Carol Goodner	Romantic comedy	
The Third String	George Pearson	Sandy Powell, Kay Hammond, Alf Goddard	Comedy	
The Thoroughbred	Charles Barnett	John Argyle, Margaret Delane, James Benton	Crime drama	
Threads	G.B. Samuelson	Dorothy Fane, Gerald Rawlinson, Wendy Barrie	Drama	
A Tight Corner	Leslie S. Hiscott	, Harold French, Frank Pettingell, Gina Malo	Comedy	
Tin Gods	F.W. Kraemer	Frank Cellier, Dorothy Bartlam, Evan Thomas	Drama	
Tonight's the Night	Monty Banks	Leslie Fuller, Amy Veness, Hal Walters	Comedy	
Two White Arms	Fred Niblo	Adolphe Menjou, Margaret Bannerman, Jane Baxter	Comedy drama	
Verdict of the Sea	Frank Miller, Sidney Northcote	John Stuart, Moira Lynd, Cyril McLaglen	Adventure	
Watch Beverly	Arthur Maude	Henry Kendall, Patrick Ludlow, Francis X. Bushman	Comedy	
The Water Gipsies	Maurice Elvey	Ann Todd, Sari Maritza, Ian Hunter	Romance	
Wedding Rehearsal	Alexander Korda	Roland Young, Merle Oberon, Wendy Barrie	Comedy	
When London Sleeps	Leslie S. Hiscott	Francis L. Sullivan, René Ray, Harold French	Crime drama	
White Face	T. Hayes Hunter	Hugh Williams, Gordon Harker, Renee Gadd	Crime thriller	
Women Who Play	Arthur Rosson	Mary Newcomb, Benita Hume, Joan Barry	Comedy	
The Wonderful Story	Reginald Fogwell	Eric Bransby Williams, Moore Marriott, Sam Livesey	Romantic drama	
The World, the Flesh, and the Devil	George A. Cooper	Harold Huth, Isla Bevan, Sara Allgood	Criminal drama	

== Documentaries and serials ==
Title	Director	Cast	Genre	Notes
Black Diamonds	Charles Hanmer	Beckett Bould, Jennie Stevens	Drama/Documentary	
Blockade	Geoffrey Barkas, Michael Barringer	Johnny Butt, J.P. Kennedy	Drama	Re-issue of 1928 silent film 'Q' Ships with sound added
The Changing Year	Mary Field	Rene Ray, Eric Finton	Romance/Documentary	
Detective Lloyd	Henry MacRae, Ray Taylor	Jack Lloyd, Muriel Angelus, Lewis Dayton	Drama	12 part movie serial

== Short films and featurettes ==
Title	Director	Cast	Genre	Notes
Account Rendered	Leslie Howard Gordon	Cecil Ramage, Reginald Bach	Crime drama	
The Bad Companions	J. O. C. Orton	Nor Kiddie, Renee Gadd, Wallace Lupino	Comedy	
The Bailiffs	Frank Cadman	Bud Flanagan, Chesney Allen	Comedy	
Black Diamonds	Charles Hanmer	Beckett Bould, Jennie Stevens, Norman Astridge	Drama	
Dual Control	Walter Summers	Amy Johnson, Jim Mollison	Comedy	
The Final Reckoning	John Argyle	James Benton, Margaret Delane	Criminal drama	
A Game of Chance	Charles Barnett	John Argyle, Margaret Delane	Crime/Sport	
Honeymoon in Devon		Dodo Watts, Jack Hobbs	Romance	
A Letter of Warning	Jean Daumery	Margot Grahame, Richard Bird	Drama	
The Merry Men of Sherwood	Widgey R. Newman	John J. Thompson, Aileen Marson, Patrick Barr	Adventure	
On the Air	William McGann	Carlyle Cousins, Helen Ferrers	Musical	
Partners Please	Lloyd Richards	Pat Paterson, Tony Sympson, Binnie Barnes	Comedy	
Postal Orders	Jean Daumery	Margot Grahame, Garry Marsh	Comedy	
Pyjamas Preferred	Val Valentine	Jay Laurier, Betty Amann, Kenneth Kove	Comedy	
The Safe		Angela Baddeley, Michael Hogan	Crime	
Smilin' Along	John F. Argyle	James Benton, Margaret Delane, Rene Ray	Comedy	
The Spare Room	Redd Davis	Jimmy James, Ruth Taylor, Charles Paton	Comedy	
Strip, Strip, Hooray!	Norman Lee	Ken Douglas, Betty Norton, Binnie Barnes	Comedy	
The Temperance Fête	Graham Cutts	George Robey, Sydney Fairbrother	Comedy	
A Voice Said Goodnight	William C. McGann	Nora Swinburne, Jack Trevor	Crime	
A Yell of a Night	Gustav A. Mindzenti	Mickey Brantford, Mignon Swaffer	Comedy	

== See also ==
- 1932 in British music
- 1932 in British television
- 1932 in film
- 1932 in the United Kingdom
