= The Pride of the Force =

1933 film

- Directed by: Norman Lee
- Written by: Syd Courtenay; Lola Harvey; Norman Lee; Arthur B. Woods
- Produced by: Norman Lee
- Starring: Leslie Fuller; Patrick Aherne; Faith Bennett
- Cinematography: Claude Friese-Greene
- Edited by: Edward B. Jarvis
- Music by: Idris Lewis
- Production company: British International Pictures
- Distributed by: Wardour Films
- Release date: August 1933
- Running time: 75 minutes
- Country: United Kingdom
- Language: English

The Pride of the Force is a 1933 British comedy film directed by Norman Lee and starring Leslie Fuller, Patrick Aherne, Faith Bennett and Hal Gordon. It was written by Syd Courtenay, Lola Harvey, Lee and Arthur B. Woods.

Produced by British International Pictures as part of a series of vehicles for the music hall star Leslie Fuller, it was shot at the company's Elstree Studios. The film's sets were designed by the art director John Mead.

== Plot ==
While Bob Porter is a sharp and capable police officer, his farmhand twin brother Bill is a complete fool. Desperate to join the circus to be near the woman he loves, Bob convinces Bill to impersonate him at the police station. Bill agrees, but his dim-witted antics quickly infuriate Sergeant Brown. The scheme hits a snag when Bill is tricked into entering a circus lion's cage while handcuffed in order to win a desperately needed £30. Bob is supposed to double for his brother for the stunt, but he fails to show up, being busy helping the police round up a gang of crooks targeting the circus box-office takings.

== Cast ==
- Leslie Fuller as Bill Porter / Bob Porter
- Patrick Aherne as Max Heinrich
- Nancy Bates as Sheila
- Faith Bennett as Peggy Ramsbottom
- King Curtis as Steve
- Alf Goddard as Sergeant Brown
- Hal Gordon as Dick Smith
- Frank Perfitt as Inspector Ramsbottom
- Ben Welden as Tony Carlotti

== Release ==
The film was trade shown in August 1933 but was not released until March 1934.

== Reception ==
The Daily Film Renter wrote: "Fuller frolics his way gaily through the piece, bringing to it his famous wealth of idiotic expression and asinine pose. Just by rolling an eye or pouting a lip he can raise a laugh, and these tactics he exploits to the full. He is capably backed up by Alf Goddard, as the sergeant, Hal Gordon as Bill's pal, and Ben Welden as the circus master ... As if the usual Fuller antics were not enough, the picture is helped by some boisterous scenes at an all-in wresting match, while a number of circus sequences are exceptionally well built in to the story. With these, and its other features, Fuller's latest opus can be guaranteed to fill the kinemas."

Picturegoer wrote: "Leslie Fuller plays the dual role of twins, one a policeman who wants to join a circus and the other a farmhand who wants to be a policeman, in this hectic comedy. He contrasts the athleticism of the one with the fatuousness of the other well, and his lively, if artless, knockabout humour gets full scope. The circus atmosphere is convincing, and there are sequences in all-in wrestling ring and a lion's cage which are very well staged. The supporting cast lives up to the liveliness of the unsophisticated entertainment as a whole."
