= The Lady Is Willing =

The Lady Is Willing may refer to:

- The Lady Is Willing (1934 film), a British film, starring Leslie Howard and Cedric Hardwicke
- The Lady Is Willing (1942 film), an American film, starring Marlene Dietrich and Fred MacMurray
