= Captain Bill =

1936 British film by Ralph Ceder

- Leslie Fuller in the film
- Directed by: Ralph Ceder
- Screenplay by: Val Valentine, Syd Courtenay, Georgie Harris
- Starring: Leslie Fuller; Judy Kelly; Hal Gordon
- Cinematography: Charles Van Enger
- Production companies: Joe Rock Productions; Leslie Fuller Pictures
- Release date: 1936
- Running time: 81 minutes
- Country: United Kingdom
- Language: English

Captain Bill is a 1936 British comedy film directed by Ralph Ceder and starring Leslie Fuller, Judy Kelly and Hal Gordon. It was written by Val Valentine, Syd Courtenay and Georgie Harris.

== Plot ==
Bill, a barge pilot, and Tim, the skipper of a private yacht owned by Sir Anthony Kipps, are bitter rivals for the affections of Polly, the schoolmistress guardian of Bill’s motherless son, Jackie. Tim gains the advantage by sabotaging Bill in a race and sinking his barge. But Bill bounces back when Sir Anthony, grateful to Bill for saving his life, fires Tim and gives his captaincy to Bill. The rivalry takes a dangerous turn when river pirates kidnap Polly. In their rush to rescue her, both Bill and Tim get caught up in the fray and take a beating from the criminals. Ultimately, Bill emerges victorious, defeating the pirates and winning Polly’s hand in marriage.

== Cast ==
- Leslie Fuller as Bill
- Judy Kelly as Polly
- Hal Gordon as Tim
- O. B. Clarence as Sir Anthony Kipps
- Toni Edgar-Bruce as Lady Kipps
- Georgie Harris as Georgie
- D.J. Williams as Cheerful
- Ralph Truman as Red

== Reception ==
The Monthly Film Bulletin wrote: "A boisterous story used as a setting for Leslie Fuller. ... Some rather vulgar play is made with his false tooth, which if it is not going down his throat is falling out of his mouth. Some of the photography is good, especially the shots of the river and the barge race. The humour is farcically clumsy. The acting is good and the characters well cast."

Kine Weekly wrote: "Breezy nautical comedy, the spirited fooling and clowning of which is played against realistic and refreshing shots of the Thames. The story, one of romantic rivalry, seldom can boast of an original situation, but the chestnuts upon which the picture relies so confidently for its entertainment are, nevertheless, made palatable by the tireless work contributed by Leslie Fuller, the eagerness of the support, and the excellent production qualities."

The Daily Film Renter wrote: "Plentiful quota of knockabout content, pleasing river exteriors, and actionful climax. Robust entertainment for Fuller fans."

Picturegoer wrote: "It is, of course, all pure artless slapstick, which is sometimes apt to become irritating by repetition."

Picture Show wrote: "A river comedy in which a bargee becomes involved with a gang of gun-runners. This is a typical Leslie Fuller comedy, in which the star is given full play with his particular brand of comedy. Among the efficient cast the most noteworthy porformances come from D. J. Williams and Georgie Harris whose team work is sesponsible for some amusing comedy. Entertaining."
