= Tonight's the Night (1932 film) =

1932 film

- Trade advertisement
- Directed by: Monty Banks
- Written by: Leslie Arliss; Syd Courtenay; Lola Harvey
- Starring: Leslie Fuller; Amy Veness; Charles Farrell
- Cinematography: Ernest Palmer
- Production company: British International Pictures
- Distributed by: Wardour Films
- Release date: 23 May 1932
- Running time: 74 minutes
- Country: United Kingdom
- Language: English

Tonight's the Night (also known as To-night's the Night – Pass It On and Bill Takes a Holiday) is a 1932 British comedy film directed by Monty Banks and starring Leslie Fuller, Amy Veness and Charles Farrell. It was written by Leslie Arliss, Syd Courtenay and Lola Harvey. It was shot at the Elstree Studios of British International Pictures. The screenplay concerns a man who is wrongly imprisoned for theft and escapes from jail and tracks down the real culprit.

== Plot ==
Slate club treasurer Bill Smithers is robbed and loses the club's funds. While this was witnessed by Bill's friemd, he is unable to testify due to loss of memory following a blow to the head. Bill is convicted of fraud and goes to prison. In an escape bid he inadvertently rings the alarm bell, which pleases the governor. Subsequently Bill tracks down the real thief.

== Cast ==
- Leslie Fuller as Bill Smithers
- Amy Veness as Emily Smithers
- Charles Farrell as Williams
- Frank Perfitt as Major Allington
- Syd Crossley as Warder Jackson
- Hal Walters as Alf Hawkins
- Hal Gordon as Smiler
- Betty Fields as Miss Winterbottom
- René Ray as Rose Smithers
- Monty Banks as convict

== Reception ==
Film Weekly called film "Broad and boisterous."

The Daily Film Renter wrote: "Leslie Fuller in a hilarious burlesque of prison life. His most ambitious effort so far, and his best. Some of the heartiest slapstick yet seen in a British comedy, which registers a ton of laughs and owes much to the slick, resourceful direction of Monty Banks. ... Leslie Fuller has better support than he has been accustomed to, and a story that suits his unpretentiously exuberant but thoroughly popular style. He is also directed with rather more style than usual, and style has been a quality rather lacking in his earlier efforts."

Kine Weekly wrote: "Broad comedy burlesque, typical Leslie Fuller entertainment, which is well done, and goes with a bang from start to finish. ...The quality of the entertainment may be a trifle coarse, but its texture is certain to tickle the humour of the masses, and it can be accounted capital entertainment."
