= Old Soldiers Never Die =

1931 film

- Directed by: Monty Banks
- Written by: Syd Courtenay; Lola Harvey; Val Valentine
- Produced by: Monty Banks
- Starring: Leslie Fuller; Molly Lamont; Alf Goddard
- Production company: British International Pictures
- Distributed by: Wardour Films
- Release date: 25 February 1931
- Running time: 58 minutes
- Country: United Kingdom
- Language: English

Old Soldiers Never Die (also known as Show a Leg) is a 1931 British comedy film directed by Monty Banks and starring Leslie Fuller, Molly Lamont and Alf Goddard. It was written by Syd Courtenay, Lola Harvey and Val Valentine, and made at Elstree Studios by British International Pictures as a quota quickie for release as a second feature.

== Plot ==
Pals Bill Smith and Sam Silverstein confuse an army recruiting office for the entrance to a cinema, somehow end up enlisted. Their Sergeant Major, having been insulted by the pair in Civvy Street, shows them no mercy. So when he is reduced to the ranks, Bill and Sam are delighted.

== Cast ==
- Leslie Fuller as Bill Smith
- Max Nesbitt as Sam Silverstein
- Alf Goddard as Sergeant
- Molly Lamont as Ada
- Mamie Holland as Jane
- Wellington Briggs as Colonel
- Wilfred Shine as Padre
- Nigel Barrie as doctor
- Harry Nesbitt as Harry Silverstein
- Hal Gordon as recruit

== Reception ==
Kine Weekly wrote: "A rollicking Army comedy, with very little story, but built up upon a succession of broad comedy incidents which cannot fail to amuse the masses. The leading players acquit themselves well, and the direction is efficient."

The Daily Film Renter wrote: "This successor to Not So Quiet on the Western Front and Sailors Don't Care moves more rapidly than either, and its humour, while equally broad, is decidedly more original. As popular and quite unsubtle travesty, on lines well marked in variety tradition, it will get the laughs in popular houses."
