= Why Sailors Leave Home =

1930 film

- Trade advertisement
- Directed by: Monty Banks
- Written by: Lola Harvey; Syd Courtenay; Val Valentine
- Starring: Leslie Fuller; Pete Bernard; Dimitri Vetter
- Cinematography: H.F. Palmer
- Release date: 1930
- Running time: 57 minutes
- Country: United Kingdom
- Language: English

Why Sailors Leave Home (also known as Barnacle Bill) is a 1930 British musical comedy film directed by Monty Banks and starring Leslie Fuller, Peter Bernard and Eve Gray. It was written by Lola Harvey, Syd Courteney and Val Valentine.

== Plot ==
Bill Biggles, a British sailor on shore leave in the Middle East is appointed by his sheikh friend as a "deputy sheikh", and has adventures in the harem.

== Cast ==
- Leslie Fuller as Bill Biggles
- Peter Bernard as George
- Eve Gray as slave girl
- Gladys Cruickshank as slave girl
- Dmitri Vetter as Multhasa
- Frank Melroyd as Captain
- Syd Courtenay as Sheik Sidi Ben
- Lola Harvey as Maya
- Jean Ross as slave girl
- Marika Rökk as slave girl

== Reception ==
Film Weekly wrote: "This is a Monty Banks confection of broad comedy, sex-appeal, song and dance. Leslie Fuller plays with full-blooded boisterousness the part of a sailor who is made a temporary sheik at an Eastern port, solely apparently, for the purpose of enjoying the pleasures of the harem. The film is crudely funny and otherwise undistinguished."

The Daily Film Renter wrote: "Thin story serves to link a series of dancing and singing numbers and humorous episodes in which traditional gags are very obvious. ... While there is nothing particularly new ... the conventional material, which has done service hundreds of times on the music-halls and in touring revue, is handled well enough to please the public which likes obvious humour, a leg show, and a certain amount of catchy, if unoriginal, music."

Picture Show wrote: "All right for those who like broad humour with little regard for conviction in atmosphere and settings."
