= The Outcast (1934 film) =

1934 film

- Directed by: Norman Lee
- Written by: Syd Courtenay; Lola Harvey; Norman Lee
- Produced by: Walter C. Mycroft
- Starring: Leslie Fuller; Mary Glynne; Hal Gordon
- Cinematography: Jack Parker
- Edited by: James Corbett
- Music by: Sydney Baynes
- Production company: British International Pictures
- Distributed by: Wardour Films
- Release date: 14 March 1934
- Running time: 74 minutes
- Country: United Kingdom
- Language: English

The Outcast is a 1934 British comedy crime film directed by Norman Lee and starring Leslie Fuller, Mary Glynne and Hal Gordon. It was produced by British International Pictures at the company's Welwyn Studios. The film's sets were designed by the art director John Mead.

== Synopsis ==
The plot concerns a travelling theatre troupe who have to take up gambling to make a living.

== Cast ==
- Leslie Fuller as Bill Potter
- Mary Glynne as Eve Baxter
- Hal Gordon as Jim Truman
- Jane Carr as Nancy Acton
- Wallace Geoffrey as Ted Morton
- Gladdy Sewell as May Truman
- Patrick Aherne as Burke
- Jimmy Godden as Harry

== Bibliography ==
- Low, Rachael. Filmmaking in 1930s Britain. George Allen & Unwin, 1985.
- Wood, Linda. British Films, 1927-1939. British Film Institute, 1986.
