= Marian Dawson =

British actress (1888–1975)

- Born: 18 October 1888; Rochdale, Lancashire; United Kingdom
- Died: April 1975 (aged 86); Scarborough, Yorkshire; United Kingdom
- Other name: Marion Ashworth
- Occupation: Actress
- Years active: 1932 – 1968 (film & TV)

Marian Dawson (1888–1975) was a British stage actress. She also made some appearances in film and television.

== Filmography ==
- The Last Coupon (1932)
- His Wife's Mother (1932)
- The Love Nest (1933)
- A Political Party (1934)
- Save a Little Sunshine (1938)

== Bibliography ==
- Nash, Jay Robert; Nash, Stanley Ralph; Ross, Stanley Ralph (1987). The Motion Picture Guide ... Annual. Cinebooks. ISBN 9780933997004.
