= Not So Quiet on the Western Front =

Not So Quiet on the Western Front may refer to:

- Not So Quiet on the Western Front (album), 1982 punk compilation
- Not So Quiet on the Western Front (film), directed by Monty Banks

== See also ==
- All Quiet on the Western Front (disambiguation)
