= A Political Party =

- Directed by: Norman Lee
- Written by: Syd Courtenay; Lola Harvey
- Produced by: Walter C. Mycroft
- Starring: Leslie Fuller; John Mills; Enid Stamp-Taylor; H. F. Maltby
- Cinematography: Claude Friese-Greene
- Production company: British International Pictures
- Distributed by: Wardour Films
- Release date: 5 January 1934
- Running time: 73 minutes
- Country: United Kingdom
- Language: English

A Political Party is a 1934 British comedy film directed by Norman Lee and starring Leslie Fuller, John Mills, Enid Stamp-Taylor and Viola Lyel. It was written by Syd Courtenay and Lola Harvey. Part of a series of Leslie Fuller vehicles, it was produced by British International Pictures at the company's Elstree Studios.

== Plot ==
The son of a chimney sweep running for parliament in a by-election, unwittingly helps his father's opponent.

== Cast ==
- John Mills as Tony Smithers
- Enid Stamp-Taylor as Elvira Whitman
- H. F. Maltby as Sir James Barrington-Oakes
- Viola Lyel as Mary Smithers
- Leslie Fuller as Bill Smithers
- Hal Gordon as Alf Jenks
- Marian Dawson as Sarah Jeaks
- Charles K. Gerrard as Mr. Whitman
- Daphne Courtney as Kathleen Jenks
- Moore Marriott as Jim Turner

== Reception ==
The Daily Film Renter wrote: "Story built round personality of star, allowing him ample scope to exploit his familiar brand of rough humour with result Fuller does as good work as he has ever put over. Hal Gordon excrutiatingly funny as star's comrade, and other characterisations well in keeping with boisterous nature of picture. Slick movement aided by rain of gags and hilarious situations."

Picturegoer wrote: "Typical broad Leslie Fuller comedy which relies mainly on slapstick for its humour. ... The action allows for crockery smashing and generally hectic fooling and Leslie Fuller fans are splendidly catered for."

Picture Show wrote: "The story develops quickly into humorous knockabout comedy with practically no romance, Excellent amusement; good photography; well produced."
