= Poor Old Bill =

1931 film

- Directed by: Monty Banks
- Screenplay by: Val Valentine
- Based on: an original story by Lola Harvey & Syd Courtenay
- Produced by: Walter C. Mycroft
- Starring: Leslie Fuller; Iris Ashley; Syd Courtenay
- Cinematography: Claude Friese-Greene
- Production company: British International Pictures
- Distributed by: Wardour Films (UK)
- Release date: 22 June 1931 (UK)
- Running time: 51 minutes
- Country: United Kingdom
- Language: English

Poor Old Bill is a 1931 British comedy film directed by Monty Banks and starring Leslie Fuller, Iris Ashley and Syd Courtenay. It marked the film debut of a very young Peter Lawford, playing the child of the main character, Bill (Leslie Fuller).

== Premise ==
A man sponges off an old comrade from the First World War who believes he has saved his life during the war, although this ultimately proves not to be true.

== Cast ==
- Leslie Fuller as Bill
- Iris Ashley as Emily
- Syd Courtenay as Harry
- Peter Lawford as Horace
- Hal Gordon as Jack
- Robert Brooks Turner as Mick
- Dick Francis as Constable

== Critical reception ==
TV Guide gave the film one out of four stars, calling it an "Interesting conception for a farce," but concluded that, "Unfortunately, the idea is carried on much too long, stretching what little material there is."

== Bibliography ==
- Sutton, David R. A chorus of raspberries: British film comedy 1929–1939. University of Exeter Press, 2000. ISBN 978-0-85989-603-0.
