= Old Spanish Customers =

1932 film

- Directed by: Lupino Lane
- Written by: Scenario: Syd Courtenay; Frank Launder; Edwin Greenwood
- Based on: story by Syd Courtenay & Lola Harvey
- Produced by: John Maxwell
- Starring: Leslie Fuller; Drusilla Wills; Binnie Barnes
- Cinematography: Walter Harvey; Stanley Rodwell
- Edited by: E.B. Jarvis
- Music by: Musical direction: Idris Lewis
- Production company: British International Pictures
- Distributed by: Wardour Films (UK)
- Release date: 15 September 1932
- Running time: 67 minutes
- Country: United Kingdom
- Language: English

Old Spanish Customers is a 1932 British comedy film directed by Lupino Lane and starring Leslie Fuller, Binnie Barnes and Drusilla Wills. It was also known as Toreadors Don't Care. Val Guest has a small role; he later called the film "a terrible thing".

== Plot ==
British couple Bill and Martha (Leslie Fuller and Drusilla Wills) win a trip to Spain and enjoy a series of adventures, with henpecked Bill mistaken for a famous toreador and ending up in a bullfight.

== Cast ==
- Leslie Fuller as Bill Smithers
- Drusilla Wills as Martha Smithers
- Binnie Barnes as Carmen
- Wallace Lupino as Pedro
- Hal Gordon as Manuelito
- Ernest Sefton as Tormitio
- Hal Walters as Dancing partner
- Betty Fields

== Critical reception ==
TV Guide noted "A formula plot which delivers predictable results," and gave the film two out of five stars

== Bibliography ==
- Sutton, David R. A chorus of raspberries: British film comedy 1929-1939. University of Exeter Press, 2000.
