= One Good Turn (1936 film) =

1936 film

- Directed by: Alfred J. Goulding
- Written by: Jack Byrd; Syd Courtenay; Georgie Harris; Con West
- Produced by: Joe Rock; Stanley Haynes
- Starring: Leslie Fuller; Georgie Harris; Hal Gordon
- Cinematography: Ernest Palmer
- Edited by: Sam Simmonds
- Music by: Cyril Ray
- Production companies: Joe Rock Productions; Leslie Fuller Productions
- Distributed by: Associated British Film Distributors
- Release date: 5 June 1936
- Running time: 72 minutes
- Country: United Kingdom
- Language: English

One Good Turn is a 1936 British comedy film directed by Alfred J. Goulding and starring Leslie Fuller, Georgie Harris and Hal Gordon. It was written by Jack Byrd, Syd Courtenay, Georgie Harris and Con West, and was made as a quota quickie. at Elstree Studios near London. The film's sets were designed by the art director George Provis.

== Synopsis ==
The screenplay concerns two coffee stall workers, who try to prevent their landlady's daughter being cheated by a villainous theatre producer.

== Cast ==
- Leslie Fuller as Bill Parsons
- Georgie Harris as Georgie
- Hal Gordon as Bert
- Molly Fisher as Dolly Pearson
- Basil Langton as Jack Pearson
- Clarissa Selwynne as Ma Pearson
- Faith Bennett as Violet
- Arthur Finn as Townsend
- Val Rosing as vocalist
- Syd Crossley as Griggs – Townsend's manservant
- Frederick Piper as sausage sandwich customer

== Reception ==
The Monthly Film Bulletin wrote: "The plot is sufficient, apart from the Chinese complication, and the dialogue is lively. Some of the situations are not new, but Leslie Fuller makes the most of them with his own brand of fooling. He is well supported throughout by the rest of the cast."

Kine Weekly wrote: "Knockabout comedy, a farrago of slapstick nonsense handled with irrepressible energy by Leslie Fuller and his diminutive partner, Georgie Harris. The story has neither rhyme nor reason, but this will be no serious hands cap to the film's popularity, for laughs are its first objective and these are achieved by the star's ability to turn every tried and tested gag to good account."

== Bibliography ==
- Shafer, Stephen C. British Popular Films, 1929-1939: The Cinema of Reassurance. Routledge, 1997.
