= What a Night! (1931 film) =

1931 film

- Trade show advertisement
- Directed by: Monty Banks
- Written by: Syd Courtenay; Lola Harvey
- Produced by: Monty Banks
- Starring: Leslie Fuller; Molly Lamont; Charles Paton
- Music by: John Reynders
- Production company: British International Pictures
- Distributed by: First National-Pathé Pictures
- Release date: March 1931
- Running time: 58 minutes
- Country: United Kingdom
- Language: English

What a Night! is a 1931 British comedy crime film directed by Monty Banks and starring Leslie Fuller, Molly Lamont and Charles Paton. It was written by Syd Courtenay and Lola Harvey, and made at Elstree Studios as a quota quickie.

== Preservation status ==
The British Film Institute National Archive holds no stills or ephemera, and no film or video materials.

== Plot ==
Commercial traveller Bill Grimshaw takes shelter from a violent storm in a country inn, and finds that he is obliged to share a room with a fellow traveller by the name of Merry. Hearing that the inn is haunted, when weird noises start and ghostly figures appear, Bill accidentally attacks Merry. It turns out that Merry is a notorious criminal, and Bill receives a handsome reward.

== Cast ==
- Leslie Fuller as Bill Grimshaw
- Molly Lamont as Nora Livingstone
- Charles Paton as Grindle
- Frank Stanmore as Mr Livingstone
- Syd Courtenay as Mr Merry
- Ernest Fuller as landlord
- Molly Hamley-Clifford as landlady
- Nina Olivette as Rose

== Reception ==
Film Weekly wrote: "It is a slow-moving affair, and its substance is to slight for such lengthy treatment."

Kine Weekly wrote: "A broad, spooky house comedy, which is built up on a succession of familiar but nevertheless amusing knockabout situations. Leslie Fuller works hard, and, by his individual efforts, strengthens the entertainment. ... There is very litte story, and the entertainment lies in the knockabout situations which are enacted in the haunted house. All the gags are familiar, but they are put over with such vim by the two leading players that they succeed in scoring innumerable laughs."
