= Kiss Me Sergeant =

1930 British film by Monty Banks

- Directed by: Monty Banks
- Written by: Syd Courtenay (play); Lola Harvey (play); Val Valentine
- Produced by: John Maxwell
- Starring: Leslie Fuller; Gladys Cruickshank; Gladys Frazin
- Production company: British International Pictures
- Distributed by: Wardour Films
- Release date: 7 August 1930
- Running time: 56 minutes
- Country: United Kingdom
- Language: English

Kiss Me Sergeant is a 1930 British comedy film directed by Monty Banks and starring Leslie Fuller, Gladys Cruickshank and Gladys Frazin. It was based on a play by Syd Courtenay and was sometimes released under the alternative title Idol of Moolah.

It was shot at Elstree Studios as a quota quickie.

== Plot summary ==
In India, a British soldier saves the jewelled eye of a sacred idol.

== Cast ==
- Leslie Fuller as Bill Biggles
- Gladys Cruickshank as Kitty
- Gladys Frazin as Burahami
- Syd Courtenay as Lieutenant
- Mamie Holland as Fanny Adams
- Frank Melroyd as Colonel
- Lola Harvey as Colonel's Wife
- Roy Travers as Sergeant

== Bibliography ==
- Chibnall, Steve. Quota Quickies: The Birth of the British 'B' Film. British Film Institute, 2007.
- Low, Rachael. Filmmaking in 1930s Britain. George Allen & Unwin, 1985.
- Wood, Linda. British Films, 1927-1939. British Film Institute, 1986.
