= Betty Fields =

British actress (1901–1974)

- Born: Elizabeth Stansfield; 31 March 1901; Rochdale, Lancashire
- Died: March 1974 (aged 72-73); Australia
- Occupation: Actress
- Years active: 1930-1936
- Spouse(s): Corky McKinley (m. 1927; div. 1928); Martin Corscheshire (m. 1929; div. 1938)

Betty Fields (born Elizabeth Stansfield; 31 March 1901–March 1974), born in Rochdale, Lancashire, was a British actress. She was the sister of Gracie Fields. In 1936 she starred in the lead of On Top of the World in a role originally intended for her sister.

== Filmography ==
- Old Spanish Customers (1932)
- Lost in the Legion (1934)
- Tonight's the Night (1932)
- On Top of the World (1936)
