= Bill's Legacy =

1931 British film by Harry Revier

- Directed by: Harry Revier
- Written by: Syd Courtenay; Leslie Fuller
- Produced by: Julius Hagen
- Starring: Leslie Fuller; Mary Clare; Syd Courtenay
- Edited by: Charles Saunders
- Production company: Julius Hagen Productions
- Distributed by: Ideal Films
- Release date: November 1931
- Running time: 57 minutes
- Country: United Kingdom
- Language: English

Bill's Legacy is a 1931 British comedy film directed by Harry Revier and starring Leslie Fuller, Mary Clare and Syd Courtenay. It was made at Twickenham Studios as a quota quickie.

== Cast ==
- Leslie Fuller as Bill Smithers
- Mary Clare as Mrs. Smithers
- Angela Joyce as Countess
- Syd Courtenay as Count
- Ethel Leslie as Bride
- Ivan Crowe as Groom

== Bibliography ==
- Low, Rachael. Filmmaking in 1930s Britain. George Allen & Unwin, 1985.
- Wood, Linda. British Films, 1927-1939. British Film Institute, 1986.
