= Radio Parade of 1935 =

1934 film by Arthur B. Woods

- Directed by: Arthur B. Woods
- Written by: Paul Perez
- Produced by: Walter C. Mycroft
- Starring: Will Hay; Helen Chandler; Clifford Mollison
- Cinematography: Cyril Bristow; Phil Grindrod
- Edited by: Edward B. Jarvis
- Music by: Benjamin Frankel
- Production company: British International Pictures
- Distributed by: Wardour Films
- Release date: 12 December 1934
- Running time: 96 minutes
- Country: United Kingdom
- Language: English

Radio Parade of 1935 (U.S. title: Radio Follies) is a 1934 British comedy film directed by Arthur B. Woods and starring Will Hay, Clifford Mollison and Helen Chandler. It was written Paul Perez, and followed on from the 1933 film Radio Parade.

The character of the Director General is intended to be a satirical parody of Lord Reith, and the NBG the BBC (in 1930s British slang, the "NBG" stood for "no bloody good").

== Plot ==
The film tells the story of the Director General of the National Broadcasting Group, who promotes the ambitious Head of Complaints to Programme Director in an attempt to stem the number of complaints he is receiving owing to the station's overly intellectual programming.

== Cast ==
- Will Hay as Director General William Garlon/Garland
- Helen Chandler as Joan Garland, the DG's daughter
- Clifford Mollison as Jimmy Clare, Complaints Manager
- Davy Burnaby as Maj. Gen. Sir Frederick Fotheringhay
- Robert Nainby as Col. Egbert Featherstone Haugh-Haugh, 2nd assistant
- Jimmy Godden as Lt. Comm. Vere de V. de Vere, 3rd assistant
- Basil Foster as Capt. Esme St. J. Entwistle, 4th assistant
- Ivor McLaren as Fl. Lieut. Eric Lyttle Lyttle, 5th assistant
- Billy Bennett as the commissionaire
- Hugh E. Wright as Algernon Bird, the inventor
- Lily Morris and Nellie Wallace as two charladie
- The Western Brothers as two announcers
- The Three Sailors as assistants to Complaints Manager
- Haver and Lee as two effects men
- The Carlyle Cousins as three telephonists
- Georgie Harris as chief page boy
- Gerry Fitzgerald and Arthur Young as two window cleaners
- Claude Dampier as a piano tuner
- Teddy Joyce and his band
- Alfred Drayton as Carl Graham, Head of the Theatre Trust
- Denier Warren as his personal assistant
- Clapham and Dwyer as two reporters

"In Town Tonight":

- Eve Becke
- Fay Carroll
- Peggy Cochrane
- Yvette Darnac
- Ronald Frankau
- Alberta Hunter
- Joyce Richardson
- Ted Ray
- Stanelli and his Hornchestra
- The Buddy Bradley Girls
- Fred Conyngham
- Beryl Orde

== Production ==
Two sequences in the film were filmed in Dufaycolor.

== Preservation status ==
The film is extant.

== Reception ==
The Daily Film Renter wrote: "Spectacular Dufaycolor sequences provide grand climax featuring hundreds of chorines, swaying with terpsichorean abandon. ...Cast-iron popular entertainment for any house, with big star and title exploitation angles. One of the most commendable things about this production is the fact that it is not merely a string of turns. There is a definite plot that would in itself be quite entertaining without the introduction of radio and variety stars."

Variety wrote: "Principal criticism is that there are too many stars, with the result none of them can do justice to themselves. ... Rather pretentious and attractive settings, with some remarkable color sequences by the Dufay color system. ... B.I.P. will probably have enough specialty bits left over for use in future productions for years to come."

== See also ==
- List of early colour feature films
