= Sing as You Swing =

1937 film

- Directed by: Redd Davis
- Written by: Clifford Grey; Syd Courtenay
- Produced by: Joe Rock
- Starring: Charles Clapham; Bill Dwyer; Claude Dampier; Evelyn Dall
- Cinematography: Erwin Hillier; Jack Parker
- Edited by: Sam Simmonds
- Music by: Cyril Ray
- Production company: Joe Rock Productions
- Distributed by: British Independent Exhibitors' Distributors
- Release date: 7 July 1937
- Running time: 82 minutes
- Country: United Kingdom
- Language: English

Sing as You Swing is a 1937 British musical film directed by Redd Davis and starring Charles Clapham, Bill Dwyer and Claude Dampier. It was written by Clifford Grey and Syd Courtenay. It was made as a quota quickie and features turns from a variety of radio and revue stars with little background narrative.

== Cast ==
- Charles Clapham as himself
- Bill Dwyer as himself
- Claude Dampier as Pomphrey Featherstone-Chaw
- Billie Carlyle as telephone operator
- The Mills Brothers as themselves
- Evelyn Dall as Cora Fane
- Mantovani as himself
- Lu Ann Meredith as Sally Bevan
- Brian Lawrance as Jimmy King
- Carol Chilton as herself
- Maceo Thomas as himself
- Nat Gonella and his Georgians as themselves
- Beryl Orde as herself
- H. F. Maltby as Drake
- Edward Ashley as Harrington
- Rio & Santos as themselves
- Jimmy Godden
- Eric Maturin
- The Sherman Fisher Girls as themselves

== Production ==
The film's sets were designed by the art director George Provis. It was shot at Joe Rock's Elstree Studios.

== Reception ==
The Monthly Film Bulletin wrote: "Variety show with a mere thread of story on which to hang turns by popular radio and variety stars. Clapham and Dwyer are the central figures, while Claude Dampier wanders in and out as a salesman for rat poison. Nat Gonella and his Georgians provide the title song; The Mills Brothers give "Solitude" and "Nagasaki"; Ris and Santos do some brilliant tap-dancing, and Brian Lawrence sings effectively '"The Mountains of Mourne." Beryl Lawrence's impersonations are both clever and funny and any pauses not filled in by Claude Dampier are occupied by Evelyn Dall with red hot rhythm."

Kine Weekly wrote: "The story is no better than most to be found in this type of entertainment, but it is good enough to hold the all-star bill together. The show is bright, breezy and attractively mounted. Good two-feature programme booking for the masses and industrial element."

Picturegoer wrote: "A film revue, featuring several well-known radio and vaudeville stars. There is a very slight story which binds the turns into some semblance of continuity, but it is really of little account. Clapham and Dwyer and Claude Dampier make the most of thin material so far as the plot is concerned, and the turns are, on the whole, quite good."
