= Hawleys of High Street =

1933 film directed by Thomas Bentley

- Directed by: Thomas Bentley
- Written by: Charles Bennett; Syd Courtenay; Walter Ellis; Frank Launder
- Produced by: Walter C. Mycroft
- Starring: Leslie Fuller; Judy Kelly; Francis Lister; Moore Marriott
- Cinematography: Jack E. Cox
- Production company: British International Pictures
- Distributed by: Wardour Films
- Release date: May 1933
- Running time: 67 minutes
- Country: United Kingdom
- Language: English

Hawleys of High Street (also known as Hawleys of the High Street) is a 1933 British comedy film directed by Thomas Bentley and starring Leslie Fuller, Judy Kelly, Francis Lister and Moore Marriott. It was written by Charles Bennett, Syd Courtenay and Frank Launder, based on the play by Walter Ellis. Bennett later called the film "a horrible thing".

== Preservation status ==
The British Film Institute National Archive holds a collection of ephemera and stills but no film or video materials.

== Plot ==
High street draper Bill Hawley gets rich after selling his property to a company who wants to run an underground railway beneath his land. He then stands for Mayor, alongside his rival the local butcher Busworth.

== Cast ==
- Leslie Fuller as Bill Hawley
- Judy Kelly as Millie Hawley
- Francis Lister as Lord Roxton
- Amy Veness as Mrs Hawley
- Moore Marriott as Mr Busworth
- Hal Gordon as Nichols
- Wylie Watson as Reverend Potter
- Faith Bennett as Edith Busworth
- Elizabeth Vaughan as Lady Evelyn
- Jimmy Godden as Mayor

== Reception ==
Kine Weekly wrote: "Low comedy, liberally adapted from Walter Ellis's play and turned into good old-fashioned slapstick. The dialogue is obvious, and the humour is artless, but good team work and timing enable the conventional, robust, knockabout situations to register and score the laughs. The entertainment is designed with unerring skill for the consumption of the masses, and with the popular English comedian, Leslie Fuller, on the bill it should prove a definite hit inrindustrial and populous areas."

The Daily Film Renter wrote: "Rollicking slapstick comedy of the red-nosed comedian type, with Leslie Fuller in leading role. Not much of a story, but sufficient to keep the action going all the time. Provincial audiences will love it – and a good many Londoners too. It has a full quota of belly laughs in the approved mode à la Fuller."
