= Lost in the Legion =

- Opening titles
- Directed by: Fred C. Newmeyer
- Written by: John Paddy Carstairs; Syd Courtenay; Lola Harvey
- Starring: Leslie Fuller; Hal Gordon; Renée Houston
- Cinematography: Jack Parker
- Production company: British International Pictures
- Distributed by: Wardour Films
- Release date: 13 July 1934 (London)
- Running time: 65 minutes
- Country: United Kingdom
- Language: English

Lost in the Legion is a 1934 British comedy film directed by Fred Newmeyer and starring Leslie Fuller, Hal Gordon and Renée Houston. It was written by John Paddy Carstairs, Syd Courtenay and Lola Harvey.

== Plot ==
Bill and Alf, a pair of ship's cooks, become stranded ashore, and end up involuntarily joining the French Foreign Legion.

== Cast ==
- Leslie Fuller as Bill
- Hal Gordon as Alf
- Renée Houston as Mary McFee
- Betty Fields as Sally Hogg
- H. F. Maltby as Kaid
- Alf Goddard as Sergeant Mulligan
- A. Bromley Davenport as Colonel
- Mike Johnson as Fritz
- James Knight as Ryan

== Reception ==
The Daily Film Renter wrote: "The story of this efiort has been concocted with little rhyme or reason, but so long as the versatile Mr. Fuller occupies the limelight, conviction hardly matters. ... Direction eschews subtlety in favour of robust action. ... Hal Gordon again partners the star as Alf, providing a first-class foil, with Renee Houston, Betty Fields, and Santos Casani."

Picturegoer wrote: "Robust farcical material of an artless order, with a spectacular Foreign Legion background. Leslie Fuller does his stuff in the way that has brought him popularity – he includes a female impersonation – and is seldom out of camera range. He is assisted by Hal Gordon, who is good as Alf."
