= Doctor's Orders (film) =

1934 British film by Norman Lee

- Trade advertisement
- Directed by: Norman Lee
- Written by: Syd Courtenay; Lola Harvey; Clifford Grey; Bert Lee; R.P. Weston
- Produced by: Walter C. Mycroft
- Starring: Leslie Fuller; John Mills; Marguerite Allan
- Cinematography: Bryan Langley
- Edited by: John Neill Brown
- Music by: Idris Lewis
- Production company: British International Pictures
- Distributed by: Wardour Films
- Release date: October 24, 1934
- Running time: 68 minutes
- Country: United Kingdom
- Language: English

Doctor's Orders (also known as The Medicine Man) is a 1934 British comedy film directed by Norman Lee and starring Leslie Fuller, John Mills & Marguerite Allan. It was written by Syd Courtenay, Lola Harvey, Clifford Grey, Bert Lee and R.P. Weston, and produced by British International Pictures at the company's Elstree Studios. The film's sets were designed by the art director Cedric Dawe.

== Plot ==
A respectable doctor discovers that his father has set up a less than reputable medical firm.

== Cast ==
- Leslie Fuller as Bill Blake
- John Mills as Ronnie Blake
- Marguerite Allan as Gwen Summerfield
- Mary Jerrold as Mary Blake
- Ronald Shiner as Miggs
- Felix Aylmer as Sir Daniel Summerfield
- Georgie Harris as Duffin
- William Kendall as Jackson
- D. J. Williams as Napoleon
- Ronald Shiner as Miggs

== Reception ==
Kine Weekly wrote: "Here is a comedy that is bound to make a big appeal to the masses, and increase the star's legion of fans. The story is ingenious and human, and upon its firm structure is built entertainment that is rich in homely humour and refreshing sentiment. Leslie Fuller is given a chance to act as well as clown, and he proves himself more than worthy of the new responsibility. The support is first class, and the staging imparts a glorious touch of colour to the spirited development."

The Daily Film Renter wrote: "Rollicking comedy fare, with Leslie Fuller on top form as 'Professor Pippin,' quack doctor who educates son for medical profession out of proceeds of pills and potions sold at fairgrounds, Star's 'rubber-faced' comicalities, hilarious antics and general resource are highlights of film that contains appealing undercurrent of pathos born of quack's gift of life savings to extract hospital from financial difficulties. Smart technical details, authentic carnival backgrounds. Excellent box-office for the masses and Fuller fans."
