= Front Line Kids =

1942 British film by Maclean Rogers

- Belgian theatrical release poster
- Directed by: Maclean Rogers
- Written by: Jack Byrd; H. F. Maltby; Kathleen Butler
- Produced by: Hugh Perceval
- Starring: Leslie Fuller
- Cinematography: Stephen Dade
- Edited by: A. Charles Knott
- Music by: Percival Mackey
- Production company: Butcher's Film Service
- Distributed by: Butcher's Film Service
- Release date: 29 June 1942
- Running time: 80 minutes
- Country: United Kingdom
- Language: English

Front Line Kids is a 1942 British second feature ('B') comedy film directed by Maclean Rogers and starring Leslie Fuller. It was written by Jack Byrd, H. F. Maltby and Kathleen Butler.

== Plot ==
In wartime London an unruly group of boys assist an incompetent hotel porter to thwart a gang of criminals operating out of the building.

== Cast ==
- Gerald Rex as Bert Wragg
- Leslie Fuller as Nobby Clarkson
- John Singer as Ginger Smith
- John Tacchi as Front Line Gang member
- Marion Gerth as Elsa la Rue
- David Keir as The Parson
- George Pughe as Pinski
- Anthony Holles as hotelier
- Ralph Michael as Paul
- Ben Williams as porter
- Norman Pierce as P.C. Rozzer
- Eric Clavering as Carl
- Vi Kaley as Mrs. Lowther
- Nora Gordon as evacuee organiser
- Brian Fitzpatrick as Front Line Gang member
- Derek Prendergast as Front Line Gang member
- Gerald Moore as Front Line Gang member
- Michael John as Front Line Gang member
- David Anthony as Front Line Gang member
- Norah Black
- O. B. Clarence as 'real' clergyman
- Vincent Holman as Police Sergeant
- Kay Lewis as receptionist
- Douglas Stewart as hotel guest

== Production ==
It was made at the Riverside Studios in Hammersmith. The film's sets were designed by the art director Andrew Mazzei.

== Reception ==
According to Kinematograph Weekly the film was "a turn up" at the British box office in June 1942.

The Monthly Film Bulletin wrote: "Maclean Rogers has made a good job of the direction of this farcical film, and it runs smoothly and quickly to its inevitable conclusion with plenty of laughs from the dialogue and the situations. "The Gang", a collection of juvenile actors, stand out for their natural performances which are sometimes in contrast with those of their elders. Anthony Holles gives an amusing character study of an excitable foreign hotel manager. Leslie Fuller is his usual self as Nobby Clarkson. Gerald Rex and John Singer are the page boys and make as miich of their parts as possible, even if the latter occasionally is inclined to forget he is a full-blooded Cockney."
