= Murder in Soho =

- Directed by: Norman Lee
- Screenplay by: F. McGrew Willis
- Produced by: Walter C. Mycroft
- Starring: Jack La Rue; Sandra Storme; Googie Withers; Bernard Lee
- Cinematography: Claude Friese-Greene
- Edited by: Edward B. Jarvis
- Music by: Harry Acres; Kenneth Leslie-Smith
- Production company: Associated British Picture Corporation
- Distributed by: Associated British Film Distributors (UK)
- Release date: February 1939 (UK)
- Running time: 70 minutes
- Country: United Kingdom
- Language: English
- Budget: £25,577

Murder in Soho (U.S. title: Murder in the Night.) is a 1939 British crime film directed by Norman Lee and starring Jack La Rue, Sandra Storme, Googie Withers and Bernard Lee. The screenplay was by F. McGrew Willis. It concerns a murder in the Central London district of Soho.

== Plot ==
Club owner Steve Marco is a criminal club-owner with social aspirations. After a murder in his club he shoots an accomplice who tries to double-cross him. Inspector Hammond investigates and solves the case with the help of one of the club's hostesses.

== Cast ==
- Jack La Rue as Steve Marco
- Sandra Storme as Ruby Lane
- Bernard Lee as Roy Barnes
- Martin Walker as Inspector Hammond
- James Hayter as Nick Green
- Googie Withers as Lola Matthews
- Drue Leyton as Myrtle
- Arthur O'Connell as Lefty
- Edmon Ryan as Spike
- Francis Lister as Joe
- Alf Goddard as Mike
- Robert Beatty as Jack
- Diana Beaumont as girl
- Renee Gadd as woman in police station
- Joss Ambler as drunk

== Reception ==
The Monthly Film Bulletin wrote: "A film which starts off with a certain amount of promise and speed but does not keep it up for long enough. The Inspector's interviews with the witnesses are incredibly incompetent, and as the identity of the murderer is known to the audience very carly in the film no mystery survives to sustain the interest. Jack La Rue and Sandra Storme are good to look upon, though the acting of the latter is sometimes wooden and unconvincing. Martin Walker introduces a certain amount of laconic humour as the Inspector."

In British Sound Films: The Studio Years 1928–1959 David Quinlan rated the film as "mediocre", writing: "Familiar 'quickie' nightclub thriller."
