= All Quiet on the Western Front (disambiguation) =

All Quiet on the Western Front is a 1929 novel by German writer Erich Maria Remarque.

All Quiet on the Western Front may also refer to:

- All Quiet on the Western Front (1930 film), an adaptation of Remarque's novel, directed by Lewis Milestone
- All Quiet on the Western Front (1979 film), a TV film adaptation of the book starring Richard Thomas
- All Quiet on the Western Front (2022 film), an adaptation of Remarque's novel, directed by Edward Berger
- "All Quiet on the Western Front" (song), 1982, by Elton John

== See also ==
- All Quiet on the Preston Front, a UK TV series
- Not So Quiet on the Western Front (disambiguation)
