= Iris Ashley =

Irish-born British actress (1909–1994)

- 1936 Spotlight photo
- Born: Iris Blanche Stafford-Northcote; 26 December 1909; Cobh, County Cork, Ireland
- Died: 5 January 1994 (aged 84); London, United Kingdom
- Occupation: Actress
- Years active: 1930–1936 (film)

Iris Blanche Stafford-Northcote (26 December 1909 – 5 January 1994), known as Iris Ashley, was an Irish-born British stage and film actress.

== Biography ==
She was born in Trellis Cottage, Rushbrooke, Queenstown (now Cobh), County Cork, to English-born parents, Captain Leonard Augustus Stafford Northcote and Lilian Cora Van Praagh. She grew up in England. Her mother was of Dutch descent and her father was a member of the aristocratic Northcote family. Her parents divorced in 1912 after her father abandoned the family and moved to Australia with another woman. Leonard wrote to his wife, "I have cut myself entirely adrift from my former life and thrown in my lot with some one else. Try and not take it too badly, because you will be far better off as regards money, and your only deficiency will be myself. I do not think I shall be much missed.".

She made an appearance on the BBC's television game show Call My Bluff in 1968.

== Filmography ==
- An Obvious Situation (1930)
- Never Trouble Trouble (1931)
- Poor Old Bill (1931)
- Nine Till Six (1932)
- The Lodger (1932)
- Heads We Go (1933)
- The Song You Gave Me (1933)
- The Warren Case (1934)
- Royal Cavalcade (1935)
- The Student's Romance (1935)
- Me and Marlborough (1935)
- I Give My Heart (1935)
- Blind Man's Bluff (1936)
- The Amazing Quest of Ernest Bliss (1936)

== Bibliography ==
- Sweeney, Kevin. James Mason: A Bio-bibliography. Greenwood Publishing Group, 1999.
