= Come On George! =

1939 British film by Anthony Kimmins

- Danish poster
- Directed by: Anthony Kimmins
- Written by: Leslie Arliss; Val Valentine; Anthony Kimmins
- Produced by: Jack Kitchin
- Starring: George Formby; Pat Kirkwood; Joss Ambler; Meriel Forbes
- Cinematography: Ronald Neame
- Edited by: Ray Pitt
- Music by: Ernest Irving
- Production company: Associated Talking Pictures
- Distributed by: ABFD
- Release date: 20 October 1939
- Running time: 88 minutes
- Country: United Kingdom
- Language: English

Come On George! (also known as Bravo George) is a 1939 British comedy film directed by Anthony Kimmins which stars George Formby, with Pat Kirkwood and Joss Ambler in support. It was written by Leslie Arliss, Val Valentine and Kimmins, and made by Associated Talking Pictures. It concerns the world of horse racing, and Formby, who had once been a stable apprentice, did his own riding in the film. Songs featured are "I'm Making Headway Now", "I Couldn't Let The Stable Down", "Pardon Me", and "Goodnight Little Fellow, Goodnight".

== Plot ==
In this farce, Formby plays a stable boy. He also has the unique ability to soothe an anxious racing horse. Expectedly, George races the horse and wins.

== Cast ==
- George Formby as George
- Pat Kirkwood as Ann Johnson
- Joss Ambler as Sir Charles Bailey, the owner of the racehorse 'Maneater'
- Meriel Forbes as Monica Bailey
- Cyril Raymond as Jimmy Taylor
- George Hayes as Bannerman
- George Carney as Sergeant Johnson
- Ronald Shiner as Nat
- Gibb McLaughlin as Dr MacGregor
- Hal Gordon as stable boy
- Davy Burnaby as Colonel Bollinger
- Leo Franklyn as Bannerman's trainer (uncredited)
- Diana Beaumont as nurse (uncredited)
- James Hayter as barker
- C. Denier Warren as banker
- Syd Crossley as Police Constable Cronley
- Dirk Bogarde (uncredited extra)
- Jack May as stable boy (uncredited)

== Reception ==
=== Box office ===
According to Kinematograph Weekly it was one of the most successful films at the British box office in January 1940.

=== Critical ===
The Monthly Film Bulletin wrote: "Although this film opens slowly, once it gets under way the fun is fast and furious. ... The songs are, perhaps, not so catchy as usual, but otherwise this is Formby fun at its best."

Kine Weekly wrote: "Riotous slapstick comedy ... Every gag in the book is roped in, and many more are added, and all have benefit of George Formby's inimitability. A versatile supporting cast, directorial resource, and generous production qualities are effective and considerable makeweight. The sum total is cast-iron light entertainment for the masses. Incidentally, it's a gift for the troops. Excellent general booking."

Hal Erickson wrote in Allmovie: "Come on George! was a product of George Formby's peak movie years."

According to TV Guide "this is one of" Formby's "lesser efforts".

Halliwell's Film Guide noted a "standard comedy vehicle, well-mounted, with the star at his box office peak".

== See also ==
- List of films about horses
- List of films about horse racing
