= On Top of the World (film) =

1936 film by Redd Davis

- Trade show advertisement
- Directed by: Redd Davis
- Screenplay by: Evelyn Barrie; Harry B. Parkinson
- Produced by: Basil Humphreys
- Starring: Betty Fields; Frank Pettingell; Leslie Bradley
- Production company: Shepperton Studios
- Release date: 1936
- Running time: 77 minutes
- Country: United Kingdom
- Language: English

On Top of the World (also known as Everything Okay) is a 1936 British comedy film directed by Redd Davis and starring Betty Fields, Frank Pettingell and Leslie Bradley. It was written by Evelyn Barrie and Harry B. Parkinson.

The film was reissued several times.

== Plot ==
After her dog wins at the racetrack, Lancashire mill worker Betty Schofield uses the winnings to start a soup kitchen for displaced workers during an industrial dispute, and then mediates between management and labour.

== Cast ==
- Betty Fields as Betty Schofield
- Frank Pettingell as Albert Hicks
- Leslie Bradley as Jimmy Priestley
- Ben Field as Old Harry
- Wally Patch as cardsharper
- Aileen Latham as Anne
- Fewlass Llewellyn as Soames
- Charles Sewell as Mr Preston

== Production ==
The film had originally been intended as a vehicle for Field's sister, Gracie Fields.

The British censor approved the submitted concept stating "the dog racing part seems very improbably but no doubt Miss Gracie Fields will get away with it."

== Reception ==
The Monthly Film Bulletin wrote: "Story, direction and dialogue are very naive and defeat even that excellent actor Frank Pettingell, who plays the local bookmaker and friend of Betty. Betty Fields does not shine in her first film. Her acting is unconvincing and her voice – she sings Lancashire songs – is harsh. ... The film has an unpleasant atmosphere of snobbery."

Kine Weekly wrote: "North-country industrial comedy, embellished with song and a universally popular sporting element. The many interests dovetail with adequate cohesion into a slight story, and this in turn basks in the valuable box-office glory of the Fields family. Betty Fields, sister of the famous Gracie, is entrusted with the leading role, and the versatility of her performance, backed up by a useful supporting cast, still further consolidates the comprehensive entertainment's appeal, thereby minimising doubt as to its success in mass, provincial and industrial areas."

The Daily Film Renter wrote: "Debut of Betty Fields as Lancashire 'knocker-up' responsible for breaking mill strike. Principal entertainment derives from high spirited personality of star in role that affords ample opportunities for song, comedy and pathos. ... Good all-round entertainment well designed for suburban and provincial audiences. ... Betty Fields will probably make a big popular hit, for she can sing a song with the best of them, and has a cheery personality that registers well. In addition, she is an actress of no mean ability, handling her role with abundant conviction."
