= Strictly Illegal =

- Trade advertisement
- Directed by: Ralph Ceder
- Written by: Syd Courtenay; Georgie Harris
- Based on: the play The Naughty Age by Con West and Herbert Sargent
- Produced by: Gordon Parry; Joe Rock
- Starring: Leslie Fuller; Betty Astell; Georgie Harris
- Cinematography: Desmond Dickinson
- Music by: Cyril Ray
- Production companies: Joe Rock Production; Leslie Fuller Production
- Distributed by: Gaumont British Distributors
- Release date: 1935
- Running time: 69 minutes
- Country: United Kingdom
- Language: English

Strictly Illegal (also known as Here Comes a Policeman) is a 1935 British comedy film directed by Ralph Ceder and starring Leslie Fuller, Betty Astell and Georgie Harris. It was written by Syd Courtenay and Harris from the play The Naughty Age by Con West and Herbert Sargent, and was made at Cricklewood Studios.

== Plot ==
Bill is a street bookie who, incorrectly believing he has killed a policeman, disguises himself as a vicar and lies low. But his impersonation leads him into much trouble, at a country house and on a train.

== Cast ==
- Leslie Fuller as Bill the bookie
- Betty Astell as Mary
- Georgie Harris as Bert the runner
- Cissy Fitzgerald as Lady Percival
- Glennis Lorimer as Phyllis
- Mickey Brantford as Freddie
- Ernest Sefton as Colonel Raffington
- Alf Goddard as P.C. Harry Jenner
- T. Arthur Ellis as the reverend
- Humberston Wright as another reverend
- Mark Daly as drunk on train

== Reception ==
The Daily Film Renter wrote: "Quota of hearty slapstick, wrong bedroom 'business,' and jewel robbery interlude help to keep fun going at fast pace. ... Fuller is in his element as the bookie, his amazing facial expressions provoking many a laugh. He is excellently supported by Georgie Harris, a diminutive comedian who appears as the hero's partner in trouble and masquerades as a little boy in a sailor suit! Betty Astell gives an interesting show as the bookie's wife, Cissy Fitzgerald capitally playing a harassed society woman. Glennis Lorimer and Mickey Brantford cater for the romantic relief, while a bevy of chorine high steppers are introduced with excellent effect at one point in the development."

Picturegoer wrote: "Broad farce developed on straightforward lines provides typical material for the popular comedian who is adequately served with gags of a not very original order. He is supported by George Harris and the pair indulge in a variety of slapstick fooling."

Picture Show wrote: "This is one of the funniest comedies Leslie Fuller has made. ... The film moves at a brisk pace, and the settings are good."
