= The Man Behind the Mask =

- U.S. campaign book
- Directed by: Michael Powell
- Written by: Jack Byrd (adaptation); Syd Courtenay; Stanley Haynes; Ian Hay (dialogue)
- Based on: the novel The Chase of the Golden Plate by Jacques Futrelle
- Produced by: Joe Rock
- Starring: Hugh Williams; Jane Baxter; Maurice Schwartz
- Cinematography: Ernest Palmer
- Edited by: Sam Simmonds
- Music by: Cyril Ray
- Production company: Joe Rock Productions
- Distributed by: Metro-Goldwyn-Mayer
- Release date: 24 August 1936
- Running time: 79 minutes
- Country: United Kingdom
- Language: English

The Man Behind the Mask (U.S. title: Behind the Mask) is a 1936 British mystery film directed by Michael Powell and starring Hugh Williams, Jane Baxter, Ronald Ward, Maurice Schwartz, George Merritt, Henry Oscar and Peter Gawthorne. It was written by Jack Byrd, Syd Courtenay, Stanley Haynes and Ian Hay, adapted from the 1906 novel The Chase of the Golden Plate by Jacques Fitrelle, and was produced by Joe Rock. It was made at Rock Studios, Elstree. It is the last of Powell's "quota quickies".

== Preservation status ==
The film was missing from the BFI National Archive, and was one of three Powell films included on the British Film Institute's "75 Most Wanted" list of lost films. A print of the American release, titled Behind the Mask, has been found, but it is a cut version of the original UK film.

== Plot ==
On the night Nick Barclay is to elope from a masked ball with Lady June Slade, a masked man takes his place, elopes with June and steals the Shield of Kahm, owned by June's father, Lord Slade. Framed for the robbery, Nick traces June and the kidnapper. Later they are lured to the house of the mad crook responsible for the theft, with the police arriving just in time.

== Cast ==
- Hugh Williams as Nick Barclay
- Jane Baxter as Lady June Slade
- Ronald Ward as Jimmy Slade
- Maurice Schwartz as The Master (Paul Melchior)
- George Merritt as Det. Insp. Mallory
- Henry Oscar as Interpol Detective ("Voltaire")
- Donald Calthrop as Dr. Harold E. Walpole
- Kitty Kelly as Marian Weeks
- Wilfrid Caithness as Raines, the butler
- Peter Gawthorne as Lord Slade
- Gerald Fielding as Harrah
- Reginald Tate as Allan Hayden
- Moyra Fagan as Nada
- Ivor Barnard as Hewitt
- Barbara Everest as Lady Slade
- Hal Gordon as Sergeant
- Syd Crossley as policeman
- Henry Caine as Beetson, Nick's butler
- Esma Cannon as waitress
- Cameron Hall

== Reception ==
The Monthly Film Bulletin wrote: "The story is melodramatic and absurd but, technically, the film is excellent. Direction, photography, lighting, acting and sound are all good ... the director is to be most congratulated for having made what must be termed a good film out of very unlikely material."

Kine Weekly wrote: "Senstational melodrama entirely unconvincing as to plot, but holding the attention by its extremely good acting and some clever touches of production which introduce the human note. Able to hold its own as a quota thriller in most programmes. ...Hugh Williams as Nick and Jane Baxter as June put up competent performances. Honours rest chiefly, however, with the older actors."

The Daily Film Renter wrote: "Highly-coloured melodrama ... Developed on lines of lurid sensationalism, action abounds in plot and counter plot that is occasionally difficult to follow, while numerous loose ends are never completely cleared up. Taken with requisite grain of salt, subject may prove acceptable quota fare for the masses, but very doubtful stuff for sophisticated audiences"
