= Zelma O'Neal =

American actress, singer and dancer (1903–1989)

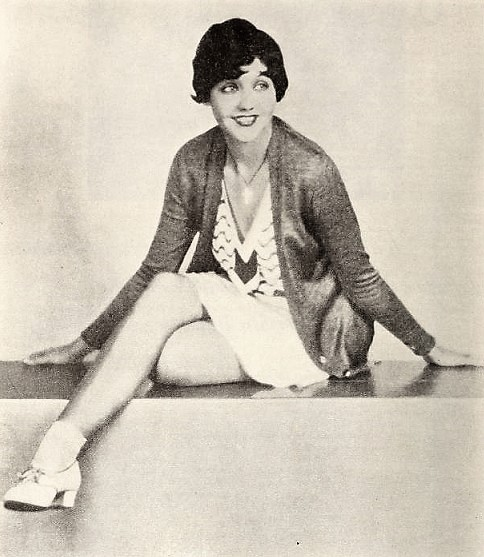
- O'Neal in 1930
- Born: Zelma Schrader; 29 May 1903; Rock Falls, Illinois, U.S.
- Died: November 3, 1989 (aged 86); Largo, Florida, U.S.
- Occupation: Actress
- Years active: 1927–1937
- Spouse: Anthony Bushell (m. 1928; div. 1935)

Zelma O'Neal (born Zelma Schrader; May 29, 1903 – November 3, 1989) was an American actress, singer, and dancer in the 1920s and 1930s. She appeared on Broadway and in early sound films, including the Paramount Pictures films Paramount on Parade and Follow Thru (both 1930).

== Biography ==
She was born Zelma Schrader in Rock Falls, Illinois, on May 29, 1903, and moved to Chicago at the age of two. She attended public schools until she was fourteen, when she went to work in a factory and later took office jobs. She worked occasionally in vaudeville, at first without pay and later professionally as a vaudeville act with her sister Berenice and a piano player. Her touring brought her to the East Coast, where she was cast in Good News. Of her appearance in that musical comedy set on a college campus, Brooks Atkinson wrote in The New York Times in 1927: "one pert young freshman, Zelma O'Neal, dances herself into willing exhaustion to the snapping tune of 'The Varsity Drag'." In a profile, the paper referred to "her personality, which experts say resembles that of a caged cyclone".

She was part of the cast that took Good News to London in 1928. There she met British actor Anthony Bushell.

She returned to New York for a role in the musical Follow Thru. She married Bushell in New York on November 22, 1928. He was appearing on Broadway in Maugham's The Sacred Flame. Follow Thru opened in January 1929 and proved a hit. It ran almost a full year. In it she and Jack Haley sang "Button Up Your Overcoat". Atkinson wrote:

That merry brat, Zelma O'Neal, who stomped her way into fame in Good News, has now moved up several rungs of the ladder to one of the leading parts. In company with Jack Haley, an excellent dancer and comedian, Miss O'Neal dances with every joint in her body, makes impertinent faces, sings loud enough to be heard, and in general makes herself invaluable throughout the evening. One of their best numbers in the second act, "I Could Give Up Anything But You", this pair of active buffoons fills out into a marvelously diversified escapade. None of the commoner repressions of the day confine Miss O'Neal's gauche and racy antics. She has such a good time cutting up in public that the audience has a better [one].

She appeared in the West Coast production of the show in Los Angeles in October 1929, and she stayed there to make her first films.

In the spring of 1930, she and her husband took a delayed honeymoon trip to Germany, France, and England. She appeared in a vaudeville in November, where her performance was well received: "In appearance the buoyant Miss O'Neal has become quite ladylike after a sojourn in, of all places to acquire that, Hollywood. Naturally she has lost some of her gamin quality, but she is sufficiently old-style in her renditions of "Button Up Your Overcoat" and "Varsity Drag", and delights her audience with an excellent act." She opened in The Gang's All Here in February 1931, but the show received poor notices–"Seldom has a lavish musical stage production struggled so clumsily to reconcile a satiric book with the antics of clowns who ask for nothing so much as space and freedom on the stage."– and closed after three weeks.

O'Neal and Bushell relocated to London in 1932, where she established a second stage career. When The New York Times reported in December 1934 that she was announced for the cast of Jack O'Diamonds that would tour England before opening in London, it commented: "That should relieve a lot of people who haven't been able to locate Miss O'Neal since the days of The Gang's All Here in 1931". The play opened to good notices in London in February 1935, and the Telegraph wrote of O'Neal: "She's that very rare thing–an attractive woman who doesn't mind making a fool of herself."

They divorced in 1935. Following their divorce, they appeared in the same show at least once, though they did not appear together on stage. O'Neal appeared in Swing Along in Manchester and London in 1936. She returned to New York on the Hamburg in June 1937.

She retired in 1938. Dorothy Lee, her co-star in Peach O'Reno explained: "Zelma was great on stage, but like a lot of stage performers, something was lost when she stepped in front of the camera. ... She sure had talent but it didn't always register on film." She also said "A million dollar personality, and twenty five cent looks".

She published her reminiscences in 1984: Memoirs from Scotts Hill.

O'Neal married actor Patrick O'Moore. They later were divorced,

She died in Largo, Florida, on November 3, 1989; upon her death, she was cremated.

== Selected filmography ==
United States

- Paramount on Parade (1930)
- Follow Thru (1930)
- Peach O'Reno (1931)

United Kingdom

- Mr. Cinders (1934)
- Freedom of the Seas (1934)
- There Goes Susie (1934)
- Spring in the Air (1934)
- Give Her a Ring (1934)
- Joy Ride (1935)
- Let's Make a Night of It (1938)
