= Pyjamas Preferred =

1932 British comedy film

- Trade advertisement
- Directed by: Val Valentine
- Written by: J.O. Twiss (play); Val Valentine
- Starring: Betty Amann; Kenneth Kove; Jay Laurier
- Production company: British Instructional Films
- Distributed by: Pathé Pictures
- Release date: December 1932
- Running time: 46 minutes
- Country: United Kingdom
- Language: English

Pyjamas Preferred is a 1932 British comedy film directed by Val Valentine and starring Betty Amann, Kenneth Kove and Jay Laurier. It was written by Valentine based on the play The Red Dog by J.O. Twiss, and was shot at Welwyn Studios as a quota quickie.

== Preservation status ==
The British Film Institute National Archive holds a collection of ephemera and stills but no film or video materials.

== Premise ==
In France the husband of a purity league leader runs a shady nightclub.

== Cast ==
- Betty Amann as Violet Ray
- Kenneth Kove as Reverend Samson Sneed
- Jay Laurier as Pierre Gautier
- Jack Morrison as Gustave
- Fred Schwartz as Orsoni
- Amy Veness as Madame Gautier
- Hugh E. Wright as Grock

== Reception ==
Film Weekly wrote: "It won't appeal to those who like quiet, subtle humour but people who appreciate very broad comedy should find a fair quota of laughs in it."

Kine Weekly wrote: "Fruity comedy extravaganza which draws its humour from a series of music-hall situations. The continuity is not too clear, but the broad, irresponsible fooling is put over with good elaboration and scores an adequate complement of laughs. Moderate comedy attraction for the masses. ... Jay Laurier plays the part of the reveller, but is inclined to force his humour; Betty Amann is a flashing vamp; Kenneth Kove is immense as a vacuous member of the league; and Amy Veness is good as the wife. The story is just an excuse to lead to the Turkish baths and night club, and the humour does not get going until these lively haunts are reached. Once slapstick takes the field, however, the fun is fast and hectic, and all conceivable gags and devices are exploited."

Picture Show wrote: "Irresponsible British comedy of a Purity League that tries to clean up a night-club, into which is woven the story of a husband who tries to pay off a vamp with the League cheque. Resourcefully directed."
