= Not So Quiet on the Western Front (film) =

1930 film

- Trade advertisement
- Directed by: Monty Banks
- Written by: Syd Courtenay; Lola Harvey; Victor Kendall
- Starring: Leslie Fuller; Mona Goya; Nina Olivette
- Cinematography: James E. Rogers
- Music by: John Reynders
- Production company: British International Pictures
- Distributed by: Wardour Films
- Release date: 4 August 1930
- Running time: 50 minutes
- Country: United Kingdom
- Language: English

Not So Quiet on the Western Front is a 1930 British comedy film directed by Monty Banks and starring Leslie Fuller, Mona Goya and Wilfred Temple. It was written by Syd Courtenay, Lola Harvey and Victor Kendall, and made as a quota quickie by British International Pictures at Elstree Studios. Its title is a reference to the 1928 novel All Quiet on the Western Front.

== Plot ==
Following World War I, Private Bill Smith is working as chef in his wartime pal Bob's restaurant, and their old sergeant-major is the chief dishwasher. Preparing for a reunion dinner, they all remember their favourite estaminet in France, and we see their wartime adventures in flash-back.

== Cast ==
- Leslie Fuller as Private Bill Smith
- Mona Goya as Fifi
- Wilfred Temple as Bob
- Stella Browne as Yvonne
- Gladys Cruickshank as Mimi
- Gerald Lyle as Private Very
- Dmitri Vetter as Private John Willie
- Syd Courtenay as Lieutenant
- Frank Melroyd as Sergeant
- Marjorie Loring as Diane
- Nina Olivette as dancer

== Reception ==
The Daily Film Renter wrote: "Even though some of the material is rather crude, it has a big virtue in that both jokes and songs will appeal to the wider public taste. Action brisk and well contrasted. A useful booking of the bright laughter and humour type."

Kine Weekly wrote: "A concert party type of entertainment, with songs, dance and broad humour set in an estaminet at the front. Songs are fair, but what gets the show over is the personality of Leslie Fuller. ... He gets his jokes, which are not always too new, over well. Stella Browne is fair as Yvonne, an estaminet girl; her voice is not remarkable. Wilfred Temple sings quite well."
