= Master and Man (1934 film) =

- Directed by: John Harlow
- Written by: Wallace Lupino
- Produced by: Walter C. Mycroft
- Starring: Wallace Lupino; Barry Lupino; Gus McNaughton
- Distributed by: Pathé Pictures International (UK)
- Release date: 1934
- Running time: 54 min
- Country: United Kingdom
- Language: English

Master and Man is a 1934 British comedy film directed by John Harlow.

== Plot ==
Two tramps come to the rescue of a lady by saving her house from arsonists.

== Cast ==
- Wallace Lupino ... Wally
- Barry Lupino ... Barry
- Gus McNaughton ... Blackmailer
- Faith Bennett ... Lady Sinden
- Syd Crossley ... Coffee Stall Keeper
- Hal Gordon ... Gamekeeper
- Harry Terry ... Tiny
- George Humphries ... Slim
