= Georgie Harris =

British film actor (1898–1986)

Georgie Harris (June 19, 1898 – March 14, 1986) was a British film actor.

== Selected filmography ==
- Don't Be a Dummy (1932)
- Doctor's Orders (1934)
- Radio Parade of 1935 (1934)
- The Stoker (1935)
- Strictly Illegal (1935)
- One Good Turn (1936)
- Captain Bill (1936)
- Boys Will Be Girls (1937)
- Rhythm Racketeer (1937)
