= Faith Bennett =

British actor and pilot (1903–1969)

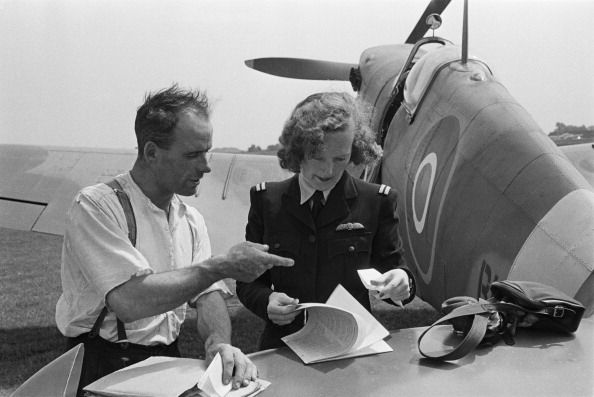
- Bennett signing to collect a spitfire
- Born: 12 May 1903; London, United Kingdom
- Died: 1969 (aged 65 or 66); London, United Kingdom
- Other name: Margaret Ellen Riddick
- Occupations: Actress, ATA Pilot
- Years active: 1931-1939 (film & TV) 1941-1945 (ATA Pilot)

Faith Margaret Ellen Bennett (12 May 1903 – 1969) was a British actress and Air Transport Auxiliary pilot during the Second World War. Her photograph featured on a Royal Mail stamp in 2022.

== Early life ==
Bennett was born Margaret Ellen Riddick on 12 May 1903 in London, England. One of her brothers died during the First World War.

== Acting career ==
In 1930, she married film writer Charles Alfred Selwyn Bennett, and over the course of the 1930s she starred in multiple British films under the stage name Faith Bennett.

== Flying ==
Bennett took flying lessons at the Northampton School of Flying in Sywell, where her instructor was the famous WWI flying Ace Tommy Rose DFC. She took these lessons alongside her acting career, earning both a British aviator's certificate and an American flying license (the couple moved to the U.S. briefly while Charles worked for Universal Studios).

== Air Transport Auxiliary ==
On 8 July 1941, Bennett joined the Air Transport Auxiliary (ATA) and eventually reached the rank of Pilot First Officer. She received her training and was assigned to No. 5 Ferry Pilot Pool (F.P.P.) in December that year, and only two days later was forced to make a crash landing due to poor weather and a stalled engine. Bennett sustained "slight injuries", and was afterwards assigned to the Hamble Ferry Pool. She remained with the ATA until she was demobilised in 31 July 1945.

After the WW2 she divorced Charles Bennett and married fellow ATA pilot Herbert Henry Newmark in 1946.

Faith Bennett died in 1969.

== Commemoration ==
The British Women Pilots' Association named the Faith Bennett Navigation Cup after her, and the trophy is still awarded annually to women pilots of special merit.

The National Portrait Gallery holds four photographs for Bennett dating from the early 1930s.

A photograph of Faith Bennett at the controls of a Lockheed Hudson bomber featured on a commemorative £1.85 stamp, part of a set of Unsung Heroes – Women of WWII, issued by the Royal Mail in 2022.

== Filmography ==
- The Officers' Mess (1931)
- Mannequin (1932)
- Eyes of Fate (1933)
- The Pride of the Force (1933)
- Hawleys of High Street (1933)
- Seeing Is Believing (1934)
- Master and Man (1934)
- One Good Turn (1936)

== Bibliography ==
- Brown, Geoff. Launder and Gilliat. British Film Institute, 1977.
