= Little Friend (film) =

1934 film by Berthold Viertel

- Theatrical release poster
- Directed by: Berthold Viertel
- Produced by: Michael Balcon
- Starring: Matheson Lang; Lydia Sherwood; Nova Pilbeam
- Cinematography: G. Krampf
- Edited by: Ian Dalrymple
- Production company: Gaumont-British Picture Corporation
- Release date: 5 November 1934
- Running time: 65 minutes
- Country: United Kingdom
- Language: English

Little Friend is a 1934 British drama film directed by Berthold Viertel and starring Matheson Lang, Nova Pilbeam and Lydia Sherwood. It was based on the novel Kleine Freundin by Ernst Lothar, adapted for the screen by Viertel, Margaret Kennedy and Christopher Isherwood. The score is by the Austrian composer Ernst Toch, then in European exile.

== Plot summary ==
Young Felicity Hughes slowly becomes aware that her parents' marriage is disintegrating, due to her mother Helen seeing an actor named Hilliard. When her father starts divorce proceedings, Felicity remains loyal to her mother. As the court case progresses, and fearful of losing her mother forever, Felicity attempts suicide. When her father hears, he drops the case, and he and Helen are reconciled.

== Cast ==
- Matheson Lang as John Hughes
- Lydia Sherwood as Helen Hughes
- Nova Pilbeam as Felicity Hughes
- Arthur Margetson as Hilliard
- Jean Cadell as Miss Drew
- Jimmy Hanley as Leonard Parry
- Gibb McLaughlin as Thompson
- Diana Cotton as Maud
- Cecil Parker as Mason
- Clare Greet as Mrs. Parry
- Jack Raine as Jeffries
- Finlay Currie as Grove
- Robert Nainby as Uncle Ned
- Atholl Fleming as shepherd
- Basil Goth as doctor
- Charles Childerstone as solicitor
- Gerald Kent as butler
- Allan Aynesworth as Col. Amberley
- Lewis Casson as judge
- Fritz Kortner as giant
- Hughie Green as boy

== Reception ==
Kine Weekly wrote: "The film is devised effectively to exploit the cleverness of Nova Pilbeam, the screen's latest child discovery, and the small player rises to the occasion magnificently. She has a most difficult part to play, but never makes a false step. Her acting is tremendously impressive, and refreshingly free from precocity. The treatment, too, is sensitive; the director, Berthold Viertel, swiftly recognises his juvenile star's genius, and gives it intelligent exploitation; it is, in fact, the under-standing co-operation of player and producer that brings drama of feminine as well as universal appeal and situations of unforgettable tenderness to the praiseworthy production. A remarkably fine British film, one that not only deserves to, but should, do big things at the box-office."

The Daily Film Renter wrote: "Sensitively directed, film has magnificent divorce court sequence packed with strong human values, Delightful comedy touches leaven more serious moments, while there is wide range of attractive settings. Nova Pilbeam makes superb debut, acting with uncanny insight, ably supported by Matheson Lang and competent cast. Superlative entertainment anywhere, with special pull for better-class halls."

Variety wrote: "Plot of Little Friend has nothing to recommend it in the way of orginality, but it is as near exhibitor-proof as it is possible to make a picture. Gaumont-British went the whole hog in the matter of direction, detail, atmosphere and treatment of the story ... designed to exploit Gaumont-British's latest star, Nova Pilbeam, who plays the child. She does this with a sincerity that carries absolute conviction with it. ... Is stripped of banality and no attempt is made at sensationalism in the settings, photography and direction. Just a straightaway picture that will have as much appeal in America as it will in England."

== Legacy ==
Christopher Isherwood based his novel Prater Violet (1945) on his experience of working with Viertel and others on the production of Little Friend.
