= The Strangler (1932 film) =

1932 film

- Directed by: Norman Lee
- Written by: Norman Lee
- Starring: Jack Morrison; Moira Lynd; Lewis Dayton
- Production company: British Instructional Films
- Distributed by: Pathé Pictures
- Release date: 25 July 1932
- Running time: 45 minutes
- Country: United Kingdom
- Language: English

The Strangler is a 1932 British crime film directed and written by Norman Lee and starring Jack Morrison, Moira Lynd and Lewis Dayton. It was made at Welwyn Studios as a quota quickie.

== Preservation status ==
The British Film Institute National Archive holds a collection of stills but no film or video materials.

== Plot ==
Dr. Bevan persuades unreputable character Lee MacArthur to stage, in his country house, a mystery play he has written. During a rehearsal, McArthur is killed, and most of the people present are suspected of the crime. It is finally revealed that Bevan himself is the guilty party.

== Cast ==
- Jack Morrison as Johnnie Scott
- Moira Lynd as Rosie Platt
- Lewis Dayton as Lee MacArthur
- Molly Lamont as Frances Marsden
- Cecil Ramage as Dr. Bevan
- Carol Coombe as Billie Southgate
- Hal Gordon as Leveridge
- Patrick Susands as Eckersley

== Critical reception ==
Kine Weekly wrote: "The story is constructed with some ingenuity and succeeds in holding its secret. The action is rather restricted, but the players themselves get down to their task with all seriousness, and this helps to impart the necessary touch of realism. The unpretentious character of the entertainment and its convenient length make the picture a useful supporting offering for the less discriminating patron."

The Daily Film Renter wrote: "Murder melodrama directed with little imagination. Series of incredible incidents follow each other to climax that is seen early on. Photography and recording are adequate."

Picturegoer’s Lionel Collier described the film as "another of the 'spot the murderer' type of film … The acting is quite good and helps considerably to make what is otherwise a very artificial plot approach somewhere near realism."

== Bibliography ==
- Low, Rachael. Filmmaking in 1930s Britain. George Allen & Unwin, 1985.
- Wood, Linda. British Films, 1927-1939. British Film Institute, 1986.
