= Lydia Sherwood =

British actress (1906–1989)

- Born: Lily Shavelson; 5 May 1906; London, England
- Died: 20 April 1989 (aged 82); London, England
- Education: RADA
- Occupations: Film and stage actress
- Years active: 1928–1965

Lydia Sherwood (5 May 1906 – 20 April 1989) was a British film actress and stage actress. She made her debut on stage in Daisy Fisher's comedy play Lavender Ladies. She was married to the poet Lazarus Aaronson from 1924 to 1931.

== Filmography ==
=== Film ===
Year	Title	Role	Notes
1933	Don Quixote	Duchess of Fallanga	Uncredited
1934	The King of Paris	Juliette Till	
1934	Little Friend	Helen Hughes	
1934	Spring in the Air	Vilma	
1936	Midnight at Madame Tussaud's	Brenda Frome	
1939	The Four Just Men	Myra Hastings	
1943	When We Are Married	Lottie Grady	
1943	Theatre Royal	Claudia Brent	
1948	The First Gentleman	Princess Augusta	
1954	Romeo and Juliet	Lady Capulet	
1960	The League of Gentlemen	Hilda	
1965	Darling	Lady Brentwood	Uncredited

== Stage Appearances ==
- Lavender Ladies (1925) (Comedy Theatre, London)
- The Last Hour (1928) (Comedy Theatre, London)
- She Stoops to Conquer (1930) (Lyric Theatre (Hammersmith), London)
- Uncle Vanya (1937) (Westminster Theatre, London)
- Hamlet (1951) (New Theatre (London))

== Bibliography ==
Wearing, J.P. (2014). The London Stage 1920-1929: A Calendar of Productions, Performers and Personnel. Rowan and Littfield Education
