= Mary Jerrold =

English actress (1877–1955)

- Jerrold by Norman Parkinson, 1954
- Born: 4 December 1877; London, England
- Died: 3 March 1955 (aged 77); London, England
- Occupation: Actor
- Years active: 1896–1955

Mary Jerrold (4 December 1877 – 3 March 1955) was an English actress. She was married to actor Hubert Harben, and mother of actress Joan Harben and celebrity chef Philip Harben.

She made her London stage debut as Prudence Dering in Mary Pennington Spinster (1896); and played Martha Brewster for three and a half years in the original West End production of Arsenic and Old Lace, opening in 1942. In 1922, in a stage production of Jane Austen's Pride and Prejudice, Jerrold became one of the oldest actresses cast as Elizabeth Bennet, at age 44. In the play, she acted opposite her husband, cast as Mr. Collins. She appeared in Molly Keane's Ducks and Drakes in 1941. In 1946 she starred in the West End melodrama But for the Grace of God by Frederick Lonsdale. In 1951 she played the lead role in Kenneth Horne's comedy And This Was Odd at the Criterion Theatre. In 1953 she appeared in A Day by the Sea by N.C. Hunter.

== Partial filmography ==
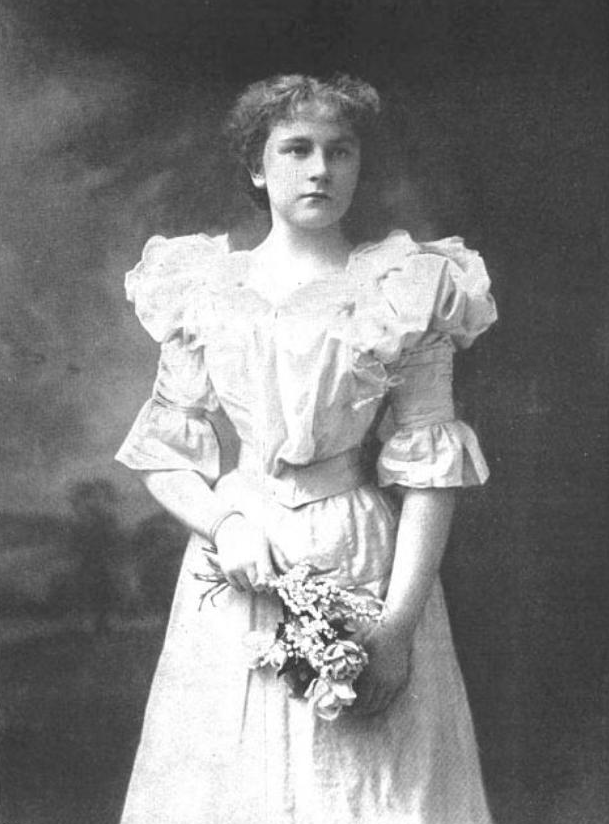
In The Sketch, 15 September 1897

- Disraeli (1916) - Lady Beaconsfield
- A Sinless Sinner (1919) - Mary Hendon
- Candytuft, I Mean Veronica (1921) - Mrs. Anstruther
- The W Plan (1930) - Frau Muller
- The Sport of Kings (1931) - Mrs. Purdie
- Alibi - Mrs. Ackroyd
- The Shadow Between (1931) - Mrs. Maddox
- The Last Coupon (1932) - Polly Carter
- The Blind Spot (1932) - Mrs. Herriott
- Perfect Understanding (1933) - Mrs. Graham
- Friday the Thirteenth (1933) - Flora Wakefield
- The Lash (1934) - Margaret Haughton
- The Great Defender (1934) - Mrs. Hammond
- Doctor's Orders (1934) - Mary Blake
- Spring in the Air (1934) - Albertina
- The Price of Wisdom (1935) - Mary Temple
- Fighting Stock (1935) - Emmie
- The Tunnel (1935) - Minor Role (uncredited)
- Jack of All Trades (1936) - Mrs. Warrender
- Saturday Night Revue (1937) - Mrs. Dorland
- Jamaica Inn (1939) - Miss Black (uncredited)
- Inspector Hornleigh on Holiday (1939) - Mrs. Adeline Bracer (uncredited)
- Return to Yesterday (1940) - Old Lady at station
- The Man at the Gate (1941) - Mary Foley
- Talk About Jacqueline (1942) - Aunt Helen
- The Gentle Sex (1943) - Mrs. Sheridan
- The Flemish Farm (1943) - Mme. Duclos
- The Way Ahead (1944) - Mrs. Gillingham
- The Magic Bow (1946) - Teresa Paganini
- The Ghosts of Berkeley Square (1947) - Lettie
- Bond Street (1948) - Miss Slennett
- Colonel Bogey (1948) - Aunt Mabel
- Mr. Perrin and Mr. Traill (1948) - Mrs. Perrin
- Woman Hater (1948) - Lady Datchett
- The Queen of Spades (1949) - Old Varvarushka
- Marry Me! (1949) - Emily Parsons
- She Shall Have Murder (1950) - Mrs. Robjohn
- Meet Me Tonight (1952) - Nanny (segment "Ways and Means")
- Top of the Form (1953) - Mrs. Bagshot
