= Val Valentine =

British screenwriter (1895–1971)

Val Valentine (1895–1971) was a British screenwriter.

Val Guest said he was "a larger-than-life character who won the VC and Christ knows what else. He was a large lively man, always brimming with ideas, some awful, some of which were very funny, many of which we used."

== Selected filmography ==
- The Vagabond Queen (1929)
- Alf's Carpet (1929)
- Elstree Calling (1930)
- Why Sailors Leave Home (1930)
- The Rocket Bus (1930)
- The Compulsory Husband (1930)
- The Yellow Mask (1930)
- Almost a Honeymoon (1930)
- Compromising Daphne (1930)
- Song of Soho (1930)
- Old Soldiers Never Die (1931)
- The Love Habit (1931)
- The Wife's Family (1931)
- Poor Old Bill (1931)
- Rich and Strange (1931)
- Kiss Me Sergeant (1932)
- Pyjamas Preferred (1932)
- Get That Venus (1933)
- Captain Bill (1936)
- The Girl in the Taxi (1937)
- Feather Your Nest (1937)
- Cafe Colette (1937)
- Keep Smiling (1938)
- The High Command (1938)
- Come on George! (1939)
- Shipyard Sally (1939)
- Gasbags (1941)
- Waterloo Road (1945)
- I'll Be Your Sweetheart (1945)
- This Man Is Mine (1946)
- This Was a Woman (1948)
- Lady Godiva Rides Again (1951)
- The Belles of St. Trinian's (1954)
- The Constant Husband (1955)
- See How They Run (1955)
- They Can't Hang Me (1955)
- Fortune Is a Woman (1957)
- Blue Murder at St Trinian's (1957)
- Left Right and Centre (1959)
- Friends and Neighbours (1959)
- The Pure Hell of St Trinian's (1960)
- A Weekend with Lulu (1961)
