= Spring in the Air =

- Trade advertisement
- Directed by: Victor Hanbury; Norman Lee
- Produced by: John Stafford
- Starring: Edmund Gwenn; Zelma O'Neal; Theo Shall
- Music by: Jack Beaver
- Production company: John Stafford Productions
- Distributed by: Pathé Pictures
- Release date: 27 November 1934
- Running time: 74 minutes
- Country: United Kingdom
- Language: English

Spring in the Air is a 1934 British comedy film directed by Victor Hanbury and Norman Lee and starring Edmund Gwenn, Zelma O'Neal and Theo Shall. It was as a quota quickie at Elstree Studios.

== Preservation status ==
The British Film Institute National Archive holds a collection of stills but no film or video materials.

== Plot ==
Ila is an American girl visiting Budapest, who tales a liking to bashful Paul, whose main interest in life is the study of frogs. She masquerades as a servant girl, while at the same time flirting with his philandering married brother Max. To further complicate matters, old concierge Franz mistakes Ila for his daughter.

== Cast ==
- Edmund Gwenn as Franz
- Zelma O'Neal as Ila
- Theo Shall as Paul
- Lydia Sherwood as Vilma
- Gus McNaughton as Max
- Mary Jerrold as Albertina
- Winifred Oughton as Minna
- Jane Welsh as Rosa
- Emilio Colombo's Tzigane band

== Reception ==
The Daily Film Renter wrote: "Embellished with conventional misunderstandings and staged principally in apartment, flying-field and nightclub settings, film has been directed on straightforward lines. Feminine lead scores with high-spirited comedy, Edmund Gwenn giving capital support in concierge study. Offering of popular caliber. ... Directed on straightforward lines, the picture manages to hold interest, mainly on account of the leading lady's performance, and the music of Emilio Colombo's Tzigane band."

Picturegoer wrote: "Unsophisticated story of a mildly hilarious order, which has a fair share of laughs and is put over quite well by directors and the cast."

Picture Show wrote: "Lighthearted comedy in which a girl masquerades as a housemaid to conquer the heart of the man she loves, who is wrapped up in his experiments, and the complications that develop from that situation. Edmund Gwenn walks off with the acting honors as Franz, although he is not too well served by his material, and Zelma O'Neal gives a bright performance as the lady in love."
