= The Lady Is Willing (1934 film) =

1934 film by Gilbert Miller

- Trade advertisement
- Directed by: Gilbert Miller
- Screenplay by: Guy Bolton
- Story by: Louis Verneuil
- Produced by: Joseph Friedman
- Starring: Leslie Howard; Cedric Hardwicke; Binnie Barnes
- Cinematography: Joseph Walker
- Edited by: Otto Ludwig
- Production company: Columbia British Productions
- Distributed by: Columbia Pictures
- Release dates: January 1934 (United Kingdom); 11 August 1934 (United States)
- Running time: 68 minutes
- Country: United Kingdom
- Language: English

The Lady Is Willing is a 1934 British comedy film directed by Gilbert Miller and starring Leslie Howard, Cedric Hardwicke and Binnie Barnes. It was written by Guy Bolton from a story by Louis Verneuil.

== Plot ==
Private detective Albert Latour is employed by three men who aim to take revenge on the man responsible for a failed investment. Realising that the man's wife is wealthy, Latour kidnaps her in order to hold a ransom. The matter gets complicated when he finds himself falling in love with her.

== Cast ==
- Leslie Howard as Albert Latour
- Cedric Hardwicke as Gustav Dupont
- Binnie Barnes as Helene Dupont
- Sir Nigel Playfair as Professor Menard
- Nigel Bruce as Welton
- Graham Browne as Monsieur Pignolet
- Kendall Lee as Valerie
- Claude Allister as Brevin
- Arthur Howard as Dr. Germont

== Reception ==
Picturegoer wrote: "Alas! Rarely have I seen so much talent wasted. The film bears not the slightest resemblance to that work which gave Columbia its reputation. It has the imprint of the amateur. I am afraid that Gilbert Miller, one of the really big men in the theatre, has much to learn as a director of pictures."

The Daily Film Renter wrote: "Sketchy comedy, narrating outwitting of unscrupulous financier, with opportunity for Leslie Howard to present light-hearted characterisation as private detective. Nonsensical twists to frivolous story supply fair amusement content, supported by effective acting, but development is on slow side and sags at times. Moderate entertainment for star fans, but less likely to appeal to general popular audiences."

Mordaunt Hall wrote for The New York Times: it is a farce of the Parisian variety which possesses something of the effervescent quality René Clair gives to his pictures. Although the action is stilted here and there, obviously occasionally because of censorial deletions, the film has the compensating virtues of excellent acting, scintillating lines and original, but decidedly mad, escapades."

== See also ==
- List of British films of 1934
