= His Wife's Mother (1932 film) =

1932 film by Harry Hughes

- Gus McNaughton, Marian Dawson and Molly Lamont in the film
- Directed by: Harry Hughes
- Written by: William Matthew Scott (play); Harry Hughes
- Produced by: Walter C. Mycroft
- Starring: Jerry Verno; Molly Lamont; Jack Hobbs
- Cinematography: Phil Grindrod; Walter Harvey
- Edited by: A.E. Bates
- Production company: British International Pictures
- Distributed by: Wardour Films
- Release date: October 1932
- Running time: 70 minutes
- Country: United Kingdom
- Language: English

His Wife's Mother (also known as Double Trouble) is a 1932 British comedy film directed by Harry Hughes and starring Jerry Verno, Molly Lamont and Jack Hobbs. It was adapted by Hughes from the stage farce The Queer Fish by William Matthew Scott (as Will Scott). The film was made as a quota quickie at Elstree Studios by British International Pictures with sets were designed by the art director John Mead.

== Synopsis ==
When a newly-married man's mother-in-law sees him with another woman and mistakenly believes he is having an affair, he goes to extraordinary lengths to try to convince her otherwise. With the assistance of his valet and friend he attempts to prove that she saw his double, a dangerous jewel thief.

== Cast ==
- Jerry Verno as Henry
- Molly Lamont as Cynthia
- Jack Hobbs as Eustace
- Renee Gadd as Tony
- Gus McNaughton as Joy
- Marian Dawson as Mrs. Trout
- Jimmy Godden as Mr. Trout
- Hal Gordon as Munro

== Reception ==
Film Weekly wrote: "This spirited British farce ... provides McNaughton with the opportunity to prove that he is one of our brightest comedians. ... Although there is much in the situations and characterisations that merely conforms to stage convention, director Harry Hughes, who wrote his own scenario, has given the plot more humorous twists than usual, and has managed to keep the robust fun moving at a brisk pace most of the way."

Kine Weekly wrote: "A pleasant, lively farcical comedy, with a bright and resourceful performance by Gus McNaughton, whose versatility provides endless amusement. The story rings the changes on a familiar theme, but the situations never fail to raise a laugh, and the film in its entirety represents a useful comedy booking, particularly for family halls. ...The humour is clean and homely, and the film should do well on the average two-feature programme."

Picture Show wrote: "Gay characterisation and well-handled direction make this thoroughly amusing."
