= The Bad Companions =

1932 British film by J.O.C. Orton

- Directed by: J. O. C. Orton
- Written by: Fred Karno; Con West
- Starring: Nor Kiddie; Renee Gadd; Wallace Lupino
- Cinematography: Jack Parker
- Music by: William Hodgson
- Production company: British International Pictures
- Distributed by: Pathé Pictures
- Release date: July 1932
- Running time: 45 minutes
- Country: United Kingdom
- Language: English

The Bad Companions is a 1932 British comedy film directed by J. O. C. Orton and starring Nor Kiddie, Renee Gadd and Wallace Lupino. It was written by Fred Karno and Con West, and made at Welwyn Studios as quota quickie second feature by British International Pictures.

The title is a reference to the 1929 novel The Good Companions by J. B. Priestley which was itself made into a film the following year.

== Synopsis ==
After Pip and his chum are sacked from a jam factory, they get jobs as waiters at an exclusive night-club.

== Cast ==
- Nor Kiddie as Pip
- Renee Gadd as Josie
- Wallace Lupino as Blinks
- Hal Gordon as Natkie
- Lesley Wareing as secretary

== Reception ==
The Daily Film Renter wrote: "Comedy on music hall lines. Sketchy story decked out with numerous gags of the cockney type, with a view to providing Nor Kiddie with suitable opportunities to shine in humour of the kind he has popularized in touring revues, Average quota filler for definitely popular halls. ... One of the comedy highlights occurs when Nor goes to bed in a furniture shop window. The dialogue is typical of the music hall. Placing a bottle before a patron, Kiddie slaps him on the back and says: 'Champagne – real pain.' This is a fair sample of the picture's wit."
