= Insult (film) =

1932 film

- Directed by: Harry Lachman
- Written by: Basil Mason
- Based on: play by Jan Fabricius
- Produced by: S.E. Fitzgibbon
- Starring: Elizabeth Allan; John Gielgud; Hugh Williams
- Cinematography: Rudolph Maté
- Edited by: David Lean
- Production company: Paramount British Pictures
- Distributed by: Paramount British Pictures
- Release date: July 1932
- Running time: 80 minutes
- Country: United Kingdom
- Language: English

Insult is a 1932 British drama film directed by Harry Lachman and starring Elizabeth Allan, John Gielgud and Hugh Williams. It was written by Basil Mason, adapted from a play of the same title by Jan Fabricius. It is a melodrama set in the French Foreign Legion in North Africa, and was the first feature film for which David Lean received a screen credit, as editor.

== Preservation status ==
The British Film Institute National Archive holds a collection of ephemera and stills but no film or video materials.

== Cast ==
- Elizabeth Allan as Pola Dubois
- John Gielgud as Henri Dubois
- Hugh Williams as Captain Ramon Nadir
- Sam Livesey as Major Dubois
- Sydney Fairbrother as Arabella
- Abraham Sofaer as Ali Ben Achmed
- Edgar Norfolk as Captain Jean Conte
- Hal Gordon as Sergeant
- Dinah Gilly as singer

== Reception ==
Kine Weekly wrote: "This drama of life, love and sacrifice in the Foreign Legion lacks conviction and is rather labored in its development. The situations do not build up logically and they are, at times, so forced that the point is missed by overemphasis. However, its dramatic limitations are partly offset by some good major characterizations, while the colorful atmosphere should intrigue the unsophisticated. Fair average programme offering."

Gene Phillips, writing in Beyond the Epic: The Life and Films of David Lean, described the film as "a turgid thriller set in North Africa".
