= The Last Coupon =

1932 film

- Trade advertisement
- Directed by: Frank Launder
- Written by: Syd Courtenay; Frank Launder
- Based on: play by Ernest A. Bryan
- Produced by: John Maxwell
- Starring: Leslie Fuller; Mary Jerrold; Molly Lamont
- Cinematography: Jack E. Cox; Bryan Langley
- Music by: Idris Lewis
- Production company: British International Pictures
- Distributed by: Wardour Films
- Release date: 21 July 1932
- Running time: 84 minutes
- Country: United Kingdom
- Language: English

The Last Coupon is a 1932 British comedy film directed by Frank Launder and starring Leslie Fuller, Mary Jerrold and Molly Lamont. It was written by Syd Courtenay and Launder based on the 1932 play of the same title by Ernest A. Bryan, and was a success at the box office. It was shot at the Elstree Studios of British International Pictures near London, with sets designed by the art director Duncan Sutherland.

== Plot summary ==
A coal miner believes he has won the football pools and radically alters his spending habits only to find he has forgotten to post his coupon.

== Cast ==
- Leslie Fuller as Bill Carter
- Mary Jerrold as Polly Carter
- Molly Lamont as Betty Carter
- Binnie Barnes as Mrs Meredith
- Gus McNaughton as Lord Bedlington
- Jack Hobbs as Doctor Sinclair
- Harry Carr as Jocker
- Jimmy Godden as Geordie Bates
- Marian Dawson as Mrs Bates
- Hal Gordon as Rusty Walker

== Reception ==
Film Weekly wrote: "'A good low-brow comedy. Plenty of incident and quiet humour – as well as comedy of a more boisterious kind – have been packed into the story. For the most part it is Leslie Fuller's picture. He is little more restrained than usual, with the result that the essentially human comedy of the theme is not made too farcical."

Kine Weekly wrote: "A good typically British domestic comedy which has a human and topical story, and is embellished with lively and popular side-issues. Characterisation is good, both Leslie Fuller and Mary Jerrold rise to the occasion, and the atmosphere is true in detail. This comedy is wide in its application and is conceived on lines that seldom fail to earn the plaudits of the masses."
