= Norman Lee (director) =

British screenwriter and film director (1898–1964)

- Born: Norman Harold Lee; 10 October 1898; Sutton, Surrey, England, United Kingdom
- Died: 2 June 1964 (aged 65); Surbiton, Surrey, England, United Kingdom (Today part of Greater London)
- Occupations: Film director Screenwriter
- Years active: 1928–1950

Norman Lee (10 October 1898 – 2 June 1964) was a British screenwriter and film director.

== Selected filmography ==
- The Lure of the Atlantic (1929)
- The Streets of London (1929)
- Night Patrol (1930, documentary)
- Doctor Josser K.C. (1931)
- The Strangler (1932)
- Strip, Strip, Hooray (1932)
- Josser in the Army (1932)
- The Pride of the Force (1933)
- Money Talks (1933)
- Forgotten Men (British film) (c.1934)
- The Outcast (1934)
- Spring in the Air (1934)
- A Political Party (1934)
- Doctor's Orders (1934)
- Royal Cavalcade (1935)
- Mother, Don't Rush Me (1936)
- Happy Days Are Here Again (1936)
- No Escape (1936)
- Saturday Night Revue (1937)
- French Leave (1937)
- Bulldog Drummond at Bay (1937)
- Kathleen Mavourneen (1937)
- Knights for a Day (1937)
- Wanted by Scotland Yard (1937)
- Save a Little Sunshine (1938)
- Mr. Reeder in Room 13 (1938)
- Murder in Soho (1939)
- The Door with Seven Locks (1940)
- The Farmer's Wife (1941)
- This Man Is Mine (1946)
- The Monkey's Paw (1948)
- The Idol of Paris (1948)
- The Case of Charles Peace (1949)
