= Kenneth Kove =

British actor (1892–1984)

- Born: 30 April 1892; Wandsworth, London UK
- Died: December 1984 aged 92; Brighton, East Sussex, UK
- Other name: John William S. Bridgewater
- Occupation: actor
- Years active: 1930–1965

Kenneth Kove (1892–1984) was a British actor. He was a regular member of the Aldwych farce team between 1923 and 1930, often in "silly-ass" roles; appearing in It Pays to Advertise (1923), Thark (1927), A Cup of Kindness (1929), and A Night Like This (1930). He also appeared in several films.

== Filmography ==
=== Film ===
- Murder! (1930)
- The Great Game (1930)
- Almost a Divorce (1931)
- Down River (1931)
- The Chance of a Night Time (1931)
- The Man at Six (1931)
- Fascination (1931)
- Mischief (1931)
- Out of the Blue (1931)
- Two White Arms (1932)
- Help Yourself (1932)
- Diamond Cut Diamond (1932)
- Her First Affaire (1932)
- Pyjamas Preferred (1932)
- Song of the Plough (1933)
- The Man from Toronto (1933)
- Crime on the Hill (1933)
- Dora (1933)
- Send 'em Back Half Dead (1933)
- The Life of the Party (1934)
- The Crimson Candle (1934)
- Youthful Folly (1934)
- The Scarlet Pimpernel (1934)
- Crazy People (1934)
- Leave It to Blanche (1934)
- Look Up and Laugh (1935)
- Radio Pirates (1935)
- Marry the Girl (1935)
- Don’t Rush Me (1936)
- The Bank Messenger Mystery (1936)
- Cheer Up (1936)
- Talking Feet (1937)
- Black Eyes (1939)
- Asking for Trouble (1942)
- They Knew Mr. Knight (1946)
- Golden Arrow (1949)
- Stage Fright (1950)
- Treasure Hunt (1952)
- Innocents in Paris (1953)
- Out of the Clouds (1955)
- You Lucky People! (1955)
- Raising the Wind (1961)
- The Organizer (1963)
- A Jolly Bad Fellow (1964)
- The Evil of Frankenstein (1964)
- Dr. Terror's House of Horrors (1965)

=== Television ===
- The Diary of Samuel Pepys (1958)
