= Edward B. Jarvis =

British film editor

- Occupation: Film editor
- Years active: 1930 - 1963

Edward B. Jarvis (sometimes known as E.B. Jarvis) was a British film editor who worked on over fifty productions during his career including Meet Me at Dawn (1947). He spent much of his career working for ABPC at Elstree Studios.

== Selected filmography ==
- Children of Chance (1930)
- Love Lies (1931)
- Children of Fortune (1931)
- The Pride of the Force (1933)
- Letting in the Sunshine (1933)
- No Funny Business (1933)
- What Happened Then? (1934)
- Drake of England (1935)
- No Monkey Business (1935)
- Southern Roses (1936)
- Paradise for Two (1937)
- Murder in Soho (1939)
- Under Your Hat (1940)
- The House of the Arrow (1940)
- South American George (1941)
- Jeannie (1941)
- The Ghost of St. Michael's (1941)
- Escape to Danger (1943)
- Meet Me at Dawn (1947)
- This Was a Woman (1948)
- The Hasty Heart (1949)
- Stage Fright (1950)
- Murder Without Crime (1950)
- The Woman's Angle (1952)
- Girls at Sea (1958)
- Operation Bullshine (1959)
- Partners in Crime (1961)

== Bibliography ==
- Capua, Michelangelo. Anatole Litvak: The Life and Films. McFarland, 2015.
