= Redd Davis =

Canadian film director and producer (1896–?)

Redd Davis (1896–?) was a Canadian film director and producer who directed more than twenty films between 1932 and 1942. He was born in Canada in 1896, but he moved to Britain where he directed his first film The Spare Room in 1932. He worked mainly at Twickenham Studios in west London. In 1937 he directed Underneath the Arches, his most successful film.

== Selected filmography ==
- Here's George (1932)
- The Spare Room (1932)
- The Medicine Man (1933)
- Excess Baggage (1933)
- Ask Beccles (1933)
- Send 'em Back Half Dead (1933)
- The Umbrella (1933)
- Easy Money (1934)
- The Girl in the Flat (1934)
- Seeing Is Believing (1934)
- Say It with Diamonds (1935)
- On Top of the World (1936)
- King of the Castle (1936)
- Calling All Ma's (1937)
- Sing as You Swing (1937)
- Underneath the Arches (1937)
- Anything to Declare? (1938)
- Special Edition (1938)
- Discoveries (1939)
- That's the Ticket (1940)
- The Balloon Goes Up (1942)
