= Hal Gordon =

British actor (1894–1946)

- Born: 18 April 1894; London; United Kingdom
- Died: 1946 (aged 51–52); Lewes, Sussex; United Kingdom
- Other name: Harold Gordon
- Occupation: Film actor
- Years active: 1928–1946

Hal Gordon (1894–1946) was a British film actor. A character actor, he appeared in over 90 films in both comic and straight roles.

He started off as a lawyer's clerk but finding it dull he decided on the stage, making his music hall debut in 1912. He toured England and South Africa in pantomime and comedy before entering films in 1928, his first being Adam's Apple.

== Filmography ==
- Adam's Apple (1928)
- When Knights Were Bold (1929)
- Windjammer (1930)
- Old Soldiers Never Die (1931)
- Tilly of Bloomsbury (1931)
- Poor Old Bill (1931)
- The Girl in the Night (1931)
- Out of the Blue (1931)
- Creeping Shadows (1931)
- Up for the Cup (1931)
- Tonight's the Night: Pass It On (1932)
- Money for Nothing (1932)
- Help Yourself (1932)
- A Night Like This (1932)
- The Strangler (1932)
- The New Hotel (1932)
- Brother Alfred (1932)
- Tin Gods (1932)
- The Bad Companions (1932)
- Jack's the Boy (1932)
- Strip! Strip! Hooray!!! (1932)
- Insult (1932)
- The Indiscretions of Eve (1932)
- Lucky Girl (1932)
- Josser in the Army (1932)
- For the Love of Mike (1932)
- The Last Coupon (1932)
- Old Spanish Customers (1932)
- Lord Camber's Ladies (1932)
- Let Me Explain, Dear (1932)
- His Wife's Mother (1932)
- Sleepless Nights (1932)
- Money Talks (1932)
- Radio Parade (1933)
- The Pride of the Force (1933)
- Crime on the Hill (1933)
- A Southern Maid (1933)
- Their Night Out (1933)
- Happy (1933)
- Hawleys of High Street (1933)
- Facing the Music (1933)
- A Political Party (1934)
- Master and Man (1934)
- Those Were the Days (1934)
- Sometimes Good (1934)
- The Great Defender (1934)
- Lost in the Legion (1935)
- The Outcast (1934)
- My Song Goes Round the World (1934)
- Invitation to the Waltz (1935)
- Dandy Dick (1935)
- 18 Minutes (1935)
- Dance Band (1935)
- The Deputy Drummer (1935)
- Lend Me Your Wife (1935)
- No Monkey Business (1935)
- Play Up the Band (1935)
- Man of the Moment (1935)
- One Good Turn (1936)
- The Amazing Quest of Ernest Bliss (1936)
- Southern Roses (1936)
- Keep Your Seats, Please (1936)
- Queen of Hearts (1936)
- Captain Bill (1936)
- Dusty Ermine (1936)
- The Man Behind the Mask (1936)
- No Escape (1936)
- It's in the Bag (1936)
- Keep Fit (1937)
- Victoria the Great (1937)
- East of Ludgate Hill (1937)
- Father O'Nine (1938)
- Break the News (1938)
- We're Going to Be Rich (1938)
- The Divorce of Lady X (1938)
- It's in the Air (1938)
- Keep Smiling (1938)
- Trouble Brewing (1939)
- Come On George! (1939)
- Dead Men Tell No Tales (1939)
- Let George Do It! (1940)
- Spare a Copper (1940)
- The Next of Kin (1942)
- We'll Smile Again (1942)
- Old Mother Riley Detective (1943)
- Theatre Royal (1943)
- Millions Like Us (1943)
- Heaven Is Round the Corner (1944)
- It Happened One Sunday (1944)
- Welcome, Mr. Washington (1944)
- Kiss the Bride Goodbye (1945)
- Give Me the Stars (1945)
- I'll Turn to You (1946)
