= Leslie Fuller =

British actor (1888–1948)

- Born: Albert Leslie Fuller; 9 October 1888; Bethnal Green, London, England
- Died: 24 April 1948 (aged 59); Margate, Kent, England
- Occupation: Film actor
- Years active: 1930–1945

Albert Leslie Fuller (9 October 1888 – 24 April 1948) was a British comedy film actor, most successful in the 1930s.

== Early life ==
Albert Leslie Fuller was born in 1888 at 14 Pollard Row, Bethnal Green, London. His father was Albert Fuller and his mother was Amelia Lipley. In 1891 his father was running a coffee house, but by 1901 he was a self-employed printer. As a boy, Leslie would help his father in the business.

== Career ==
=== Stage ===
From an early age Fuller became obsessed with show business, and started performing in a small schoolboy minstrel troupe. With a voice of sorts (he described himself as a "bad baritone"), and with a repertoire of only three songs, he joined a troupe playing on Brighton beach. He then moved on to join a troupe in Maidenhead, playing in a small marquee by the river and during the regatta on the river itself in a small punt. Between 1909 and 1912 both Leslie and his brother Dave Fuller performed in "The Silloth Pierrots" at Silloth, Cumberland. In 1914 at the end of a summer season in Weston-super-Mare, Fuller married one of his fellow entertainers, the 26-year-old dancer and male impersonator Beatrice Witham.

He was also a keen cyclist, and held various cycling records. On the outbreak of the First World War, he became a second-lieutenant in the Huntingdonshire Cyclist Battalion. When his show business talents were discovered he was asked to form a battalion concert party. There were many men in the battalion with talent, including Charles Laughton, and the concert party was a great success. Fuller became one of the leading comedians on the British Army concert party circuit. The cyclists' battalion came in for a lot of ribbing and was dubbed the "poor man's cavalry" or the "pedallers", and so the troupe adopted the name "The Ped'lers". They gave some successful performances at the Coliseum Theatre in Whitby, Yorkshire, and for a while Fuller became lessee of the theatre.

On demobilisation he acquired all the rights and property of the concert party and, retaining some of its wartime members, started up his own venture. His wife Beatrice was a talented clothes designer and seamstress, and together they set about putting the Ped'lers onto a commercial footing. They arrived in Margate, Kent, for the summer season in 1919, playing to appreciative audiences at the Clifton Hall, attached to the Baths. The couple moved into 25, Cliftonville Avenue and had two sons, Roy and Donald.

By the 1930s Fuller had become well known as "The rubber-faced comedian", and spent his summer seasons in Margate. In the winter he and the Margate Ped'lers toured the Oswald Stoll theatre circuit, including, in London, The Coliseum and The Alhambra. He also appeared in radio programmes.

=== Film ===
Fuller was becoming noticed, and was offered a part in a film, Why Sailors Leave Home, by producer Joe Rock, who had produced some of Stan Laurel's comedies. This was the start of his film career, followed by Kiss Me Sergeant (1931), The Last Coupon (1932), and A Political Party (1933). Fuller went on make around 26 films between 1930 and 1945, many of them "quota quickies". He leased the old Neptune Studios at Elstree and produced his own movies under the name "Leslie Fuller Pictures Ltd".

In 1930, just as his film career had taken off, his wife Beatrice, who had been ill for about two years, died. Fuller continued to work, and while he was filming The Pride of the Force in 1932, he met his second wife, Anne ("Nan") Bates, who was appearing as a bare-back elephant rider in a circus. She had appeared in concert parties doing tap routines together with her sisters Helen and Cecilia and her brother John, so had much in common with Leslie. They married and bought a house in Teddington, Middlesex and became the parents of twin girls, Anne and Sheila, whose godparents were Renee Houston and Gracie Fields.

With the outbreak of the Second World War, fewer films were made, and Fuller's style of comedy was beginning to date. In 1945 he made one last film, What Do We Do Now?, in which he only had a minor role supporting another comedian, George Moon.

== Later life and death ==
Fuller sold up his Teddington house and moved back to Margate, taking up residence at 20 Cornwall Gardens. In 1945 he stood for and was elected as an independent councillor for the Cliftonville Ward. He busied himself in local affairs, and often turned out to play in charity cricket matches. He successfully revived the Ped'lers again for the 1946 summer season at the Lido Theatre, Cliftonville.

Fuller died at home in 1948 aged 59 after a suffering a severe brain haemorrhage. He is buried at Margate Cemetery. After his death, his wife sold the Margate home and moved back to London.

== Reputation ==
In his heyday in the 1930s, Fuller was a major celebrity with a considerable following. He drew massive crowds at public appearances. British Pathé News filmed his daughters' christening; and the studios dubbed him "Elstree's Clark Gable".

== Filmography ==
- Why Sailors Leave Home (1930)
- Kiss Me Sergeant (1930)
- Not So Quiet on the Western Front (1930)
- Poor Old Bill (1931)
- What a Night! (1931)
- Old Soldiers Never Die (1931)
- Bill's Legacy (1931)
- The Last Coupon (1932)
- Old Spanish Customers (1932)
- Tonight's the Night (1932)
- Hawleys of High Street (1933)
- The Pride of the Force (1933)
- Lost in the Legion (1934)
- A Political Party (1934)
- Doctor's Orders (1934)
- The Outcast (1934)
- Captain Bill (1935)
- Strictly Illegal (1935)
- The Stoker (1935)
- One Good Turn (1936)
- Boys Will Be Girls (1937)
- Two Smart Men (1940)
- The Middle Watch (1940)
- My Wife's Family (1941)
- Front Line Kids (1942)
- What Do We Do Now? (1945)
