= Syd Courtenay =

British actor and screenwriter

Syd Courtenay was a South African-born British actor and screenwriter. He was a frequent collaborator with the comedian Leslie Fuller. Courtenay first met Fuller in 1919 in Margate and they soon struck up a partnership with routines featuring their comedic character Bill. With the arrival of sound films they were signed to British International Pictures and made their first film Not So Quiet on the Western Front in 1930. They made a large number of films during the 1930s, generally featuring the character of Bill, with Courtenay writing and acting in many of them. He was married to Lola Harvey, who co-wrote a number of films with him.

== Selected filmography ==
=== Actor ===
- Why Sailors Leave Home (1930)
- What a Night! (1931)
- Poor Old Bill (1931)
- Bill's Legacy (1931)
- Kiss Me Sergeant (1932)
- Old Spanish Customers (1932)
- Hawley's of High Street (1933)
- Strictly Illegal (1935)
- Boys Will Be Girls (1937)
- Cotton Queen (1937)
- Sing as You Swing (1937)

=== Director ===
- Darby and Joan (1937)

=== Screenwriter ===
- Old Soldiers Never Die (1931)
- The Man Behind the Mask (1936)

== Bibliography ==
- Sutton, David R. A Chorus of Raspberries: British Film Comedy 1929-1939. University of Exeter Press, 2000.
