= Lola Harvey =

British screenwriter and actress

- Occupations: Actress, Screenwriter
- Years active: 1930-1934 (film)

Lola Harvey was a British screenwriter and film actress. She and her husband Syd Courtenay were employed by British International Pictures, the leading British film studio of the era, to write screenplays together. Their work provided a number of scripts for the popular comedian Leslie Fuller.

== Selected filmography ==
=== Screenwriter ===
- Old Soldiers Never Die (1931)
- Doctor's Orders (1934)
- Lost in the Legion (1934)

== Bibliography ==
- Harper, Sue. Women in British Cinema: Mad, Bad and Dangerous to Know. A&C Black 2000.
