= Spare Room =

Spare Room may refer to:

- The Spare Room
- The Spare Room (film)
- Spare Room Restaurant and Lounge, Portland, Oregon, U.S.
