= The Life and Adventures of Nicholas Nickleby (1947 film) =

1947 British film by Alberto Cavalcanti

- Original UK 1947 quad format poster
- Directed by: Cavalcanti
- Screenplay by: John Dighton
- Based on: The Life and Adventures of Nicholas Nickleby by Charles Dickens
- Produced by: Michael Balcon
- Starring: Cedric Hardwicke; Stanley Holloway; Alfred Drayton; Cyril Fletcher; Bernard Miles; Derek Bond; Sally Ann Howes; Fay Compton; Sybil Thorndyke; Mary Merrall; Athene Seyler
- Cinematography: Gordon Dines
- Edited by: Leslie Norman
- Music by: 14th Baron Berners
- Production company: Ealing Studios
- Distributed by: General Film Distributors
- Release date: 12 March 1947 (UK)
- Running time: 108 minutes
- Country: United Kingdom
- Language: English
- Budget: £146,069
- Box office: £139,314 (UK)

The Life and Adventures of Nicholas Nickleby (also known simply as Nicholas Nickleby) is a 1947 British drama film directed by Alberto Cavalcanti and starring Cedric Hardwicke, with Derek Bond in the title role. The screenplay by John Dighton is based on the Charles Dickens novel The Life and Adventures of Nicholas Nickleby (1839). This first sound screen adaptation of the book followed silent films released in 1903 and 1912.

== Plot ==
After the father of a family dies, leaving the wife and children with no source of income, Nicholas Nickleby, with his mother and his younger sister Kate, travel to London to seek help from their wealthy but cold-hearted uncle Ralph, a money-lender. Ralph arranges for Nicholas to be hired as a tutor, and finds Kate work as a seamstress. Nicholas meets his new employer Mr. Squeers just as he concludes his daily business with Mr. Snawley, who is "boarding" his two unwanted stepsons.

Nicholas is horrified to discover that his employers, the sadistic Mr. and Mrs. Squeers, run their boarding school, Dotheboys Hall in Yorkshire, like a prison. They physically, verbally, and emotionally abuse their young charges on a regular basis. Nicholas eventually rebels and escapes, taking with him young friend – the crippled Smike.

Nicholas and Smike take lodgings with Newman Noggs, Ralph Nickleby's clerk. Nicholas tries to find a job, but rejects a low-paying position as a politician's secretary. A job as a tutor of French for the Kenwig daughters comes to comic disaster. He and Smike decide to search for work elsewhere. As they are leaving the city, they make the acquaintance of Madeline Bray, the sole support of her father, who gambled away his fortune and now is indebted to Nicholas's uncle.

In search of food and lodging, they stop at an inn, and the proprietor introduces them to actor-manager Vincent Crummles, who owns and operates a travelling theatrical troupe with his actress wife. Crummles hires the two as actors and casts them in a production of Romeo and Juliet, in which they are successful.

Nicholas decides to return to London after he receives a letter from Noggs, who urges him to come back as quickly as possible as his uncle has put his sister in great jeopardy despite his promise to make certain they come to no harm. Kate has been subjected to unwanted attention from Sir Mulberry Hawk and Lord Verisopht, clients of her uncle, and when Nicholas overhears them bawdily discussing her in a tavern he is determined to defend his sister's honour. Hawk refuses Nicholas's demand to "step outside", and they fight in Hawk's carriage, resulting in an accident in which Hawk is injured. Hawk and Lord Verisopht argue over Hawk's lack of honour, and Hawk kills Lord Verisopht in a duel with pistols. As a result, Ralph Nickleby loses £6,000, owed to him by Verisopht, much to the delight of Noggs, who harbours a hidden desire for revenge against his employer.

Nicholas then finds employment as a clerk with the portly, benevolent, twin brothers Cheeryble, whose nephew Frank begins to court Kate. They provide him a cottage in which Nicholas can place his family and Smike, who has been accepted warmly by all. Meanwhile, Squeers returns to London, planning to capture Smike and bring him back to Dotheboys Hall, and is engaged by Ralph Nickleby to stalk Nicholas and Smike. Squeers and Mr. Snawley make off with Smike "on the wishes of his father". Nicholas, aided by Noggs, intercepts them and foils the plot. Smike, severely beaten by Squeers, is nursed by Kate and falls in love with her.

Nicholas meets Madeline a third time when the Cheerybles assign Nicholas to help her situation, in secrecy from her father. His uncle has been trying to coerce her father into giving Ralph her hand in marriage in exchange for settlement of his debt, and Mr. Bray finally accedes. Noggs warns Nicholas, who arrives at the Bray lodgings to find Madeline, unhappily dressed in a wedding gown, awaiting her fate. In a showdown with Ralph, Kate reveals to Madeline the true nature of Ralph Nickleby's character. Madeline's father is found dead in his bedroom, Madeline faints and Nicholas carries her away, warning Ralph to leave her alone as she is now free of all obligations.

Ralph's hatred of Nicholas makes him determined to ruin him, but he is brought up short by Noggs, who has realised from the facts told him by Nicholas that Smike is actually Ralph's son, whom Ralph had secretly put in the charge of a poor family, who kept the money he paid them but sent the boy to Dotheboys. Ralph's hold over Noggs has compelled him to harbour the secret for fifteen years. Smike was sent away after his mother's death, using a forged birth certificate, so that Ralph could keep her inheritance rather than let their child have it, as dictated by law. Further, Squeers hired Snawley to act the part of Smike's father to make his kidnapping appear legal. Noggs delights in telling Ralph that Squeers has confessed the conspiracy to the authorities, and Ralph now faces prison and financial ruin.

Smike, fallen into hopelessness because Kate is in love with Frank, succumbs to his various ailments and dies just before Ralph arrives at Smike's deathbed. The police come to Ralph's house to arrest him. Ralph flees to his garret and hangs himself. True love prevails, and Nicholas and Madeline and Kate and Frank are wed.

== Cast ==
- Cedric Hardwicke as Ralph Nickleby
- Stanley Holloway as Vincent Crummles
- Alfred Drayton as Wackford Squeers
- Cyril Fletcher as Alfred Mantalini
- Bernard Miles as Newman Noggs
- Derek Bond as Nicholas Nickleby
- Sally Ann Howes as Kate Nickleby
- Mary Merrall as Mrs. Catherine Nickleby
- Sybil Thorndike as Mrs. Squeers
- Vera Pearce as Mrs. Crummles
- Cathleen Nesbitt as Miss Knag
- Athene Seyler as Miss La Creevy
- Cecil Ramage as Sir Mulberry Hawk
- George Relph as Mr. Bray
- Emrys Jones as Frank Cheeryble
- Fay Compton as Mme Mantalini
- Jill Balcon as Madeline Bray
- Aubrey Woods as Smike
- Vida Hope as Fanny Squeers
- Roy Hermitage as Wackford Squeers Jr.
- Patricia Hayes as Phoebe
- Una Bart as Infant Phenomenon
- June Elvin as Miss Snevellicci
- Drusilla Wills as Mrs. Grudden
- James Hayter as Ned Cheeryble / Charles Cheeryble
- Roddy Hughes as Tim Linkinwater
- Michael Shepley as Mr. Gregsbury M.P.
- Timothy Bateson as Lord Verisopht (billed as Tim Bateson)
- Laurence Hanray as Mr. Gride
- Frederick Burtwell as Sheriff Murray
- John Salew as Mr. Lillyvick
- Arthur Brander as Mr. Snawley
- Eliot Makeham as Postman
- Guy Rolfe as Mr. Folair (uncredited)
- Dandy Nichols as Mantalini Employee (uncredited)
- Hattie Jacques as Mrs. Kenwick (uncredited)
- Jean Marsh as Sewing Girl (uncredited)

== Reception ==
=== Box office ===
According to trade papers, the film was a "notable box office attraction" at British cinemas in 1947.

The film earned distributor's gross receipts of £139,313 in the UK of which £106,427 went to the producer.

=== Critical response ===
Bosley Crowther of The New York Times wrote that "comparison to Great Expectations puts it somewhat in the shade, mainly because the former was so much more exciting as to plot and a good bit more satisfying in the nature and performance of its characters." Crowther considered it "a good whole cut below that of Great Expectations and its tension is nowhere near as well sustained", adding that there was a "failure to get real pace or tension in the film's last half." He highlighted the "compression of details and incidents compelled by John Dighton's script", believing this "overabundance also hampers the rounding of characters".

In a retrospective review, Time Out London argued that "Cavalcanti makes surprisingly little of the surreal possibilities of this convoluted Dickensian nightmare." The review acknowledged "an impressively atmospheric Victorian London, but stylish visuals hardly compensate for the flat, cursory rendering of some of Dickens' best drawn characters." However, the review praised the performances of Cedric Hardwicke and Bernard Miles, who were "given enough space to establish a proper presence." Time Out concluded, "Meagre and one-dimensional, the film is finally smothered by Ealing's cosy sentimentality".
