= Ernest Sefton =

British actor (1883–1954)

- in Bank Holiday (1938)
- Born: Ernest Henry Tipton; 13 January 1883; Hackney, London, UK
- Died: 5 December 1954 (aged 71); Surrey, UK
- Years active: 1932–1946

Ernest Sefton (born as Ernest Henry Tipton; 13 January 1883 in Hackney, London – 5 December 1954) was a British film actor. He was the brother of Violet Loraine.

== Selected filmography ==
- A Night Like This (1932) - Customer at Moonstone Club (uncredited)
- The Innocents of Chicago (1932) - Gangster
- The Sign of Four (1932) - Barrett (uncredited)
- Old Spanish Customers (1932) - Tormillio
- Double Wedding (1933) - PC
- Great Stuff (1933) - Captain
- Britannia of Billingsgate (1933) - Publicity Man
- Radio Parade (1933) - Nightclub Compere (uncredited)
- Enemy of the Police (1933) - Slingsby
- The Bermondsey Kid (1933) - Lou Rodman
- I Adore You (1933) - Pilbeam
- Strike It Rich (1933) - Sankey
- Red Wagon (1933) - Leeman (uncredited)
- I'll Stick to You (1933) - Mortimer Moody
- Little Miss Nobody (1933) - Mr. Morrison
- The Girl in Possession (1934) - Wagstaffe
- Big Business (1934) - Mac
- What's in a Name? (1934) - Light
- The Third Clue (1934) - Newman
- Murder at Monte Carlo (1935) - Sankey
- Be Careful, Mr. Smith (1935)
- Hello, Sweetheart (1935) - (uncredited)
- Heat Wave (1935) - Man in Post Office (uncredited)
- Look Up and Laugh (1935) - Borough Engineer (uncredited)
- No Limit (1935) - Mr. Hardacre
- The Ghost Goes West (1935) - Warehouse Robber (uncredited)
- Butter and Egg Man (1935)
- She Shall Have Music (1935) - Mr. Wallace
- Say It with Diamonds (1935) - Mocket
- Strictly Illegal (1935) - The Colonel
- Cheer Up (1936) - Tom Page
- Wolf's Clothing (1936) - Finden Charvet
- Broken Blossoms (1936) - Manager
- The Man Who Could Work Miracles (1936) - Reporter (uncredited)
- It's in the Bag (1936) - Jerry Gee
- Double Alibi (1937, Short) - Crayshaw
- The Great Barrier (1937) - Magistrate
- Cotton Queen (1937) - Owen Mill Gatekeeper (uncredited)
- The Fatal Hour (1937) - Pat
- The Angelus (1937) - (uncredited)
- Chinatown Nights (1937) - (uncredited)
- Jennifer Hale (1937) - Police Sergeant Owen
- Little Miss Somebody (1937)
- Millions (1937) - Naseby
- It's a Grand Old World (1937) - Manager of Employment Exchange (uncredited)
- Bank Holiday (1938) - Pier Entertainer (uncredited)
- I See Ice (1938) - Outhwaite
- The Villiers Diamond (1938) - Harry (uncredited)
- Bad Boy (1938) - Sam Barnes
- The Body Vanished (1939) - Sergeant Hopkins
- Laugh It Off (1940) - Tall Railway Porter
- Old Mother Riley in Society (1940) - Stage Manager (uncredited)
- That's the Ticket (1940) - Marchand
- Old Mother Riley in Business (1941)
- Old Mother Riley's Circus (1941) - Policeman
- Lady from Lisbon (1942) - Rosenkeller (uncredited)
- Mistaken Identity (1942) - Col. Carey
- Here Comes the Sun (1946) - Usher
- The Grand Escapade (1947) - Simon Archer (final film role)
