= The Perfect Flaw =

1934 film by Manning Haynes

- D. A. Clarke-Smith, Ralph Truman and Naomi Waters in the film
- Directed by: Manning Haynes
- Screenplay by: Michael Barringer
- Starring: Naomi Waters; Ralph Truman; D.A. Clarke-Smith
- Cinematography: Robert Lapresle
- Production company: Fox-British Pictures
- Release date: 12 November 1934
- Running time: 51 minutes
- Country: United Kingdom
- Language: English

The Perfect Flaw is a 1934 British quota quickie crime film directed by H. Manning Haynes and starring Naomi Waters, Ralph Truman and William Hartnell. It was written by Michael Barringer.

== Preservation status ==
The British Film Institute National Archive holds a collection of stills but no film or video materials.

== Plot ==
Louis Maddox, a crooked share-pusher, exploits the client list of the long-established stockbroking firm Kearns and Co. to advance his unscrupulous schemes, aided by Drexel, a partner in the firm. When Kearns gets wind of the plot and threatens to go to the police, Maddox counters the move by forcing Drexel to agree to their boss's murder. Using a dictaphone-like machine, they prepare what they believe to be a perfect alibi. However, their plan falils when Maddox is unexpectedly shot and killed by a disgruntled client.

== Cast ==
- Naomi Waters as Phyllis Kearns
- D. A. Clarke-Smith as Louis Maddox
- Ralph Truman as Richard Drexel
- Wally Patch as Bert
- Charles Carson as Henry Kearns
- Romilly Lunge as Jack Robbins
- William Hartnell as Vickers
- Hal Walters as Jennings

== Reception ==
Kine Weekly wrote: "Manning Haynes, the producer, conceals the loopholes in the plot by making the most of the romantic theme and comedy. By keeping the fundamentals in true perspective he builds up entertainment that should please the masses. There is no attempt at subtlety, the film's modest strength rests on its likeable and disarming artlessness."

The Daily Film Renter wrote: "Not too convincingly presented, continuity jumpy, main entertainment being vested in character comedy portrayal by Wally Patch. Average fare for the uncritical."

Picture Show wrote: "A poor drama of crooked work in a stockbroker's oflice mixed with some attempt at comedy, but insufficient to hold the attention. Naomi Waters as Phyllis gives the best performance of the cast."
