= The Stickpin =

- Directed by: Leslie S. Hiscott
- Written by: Michael Barringer
- Produced by: Herbert Smith
- Starring: Henry Kendall; Betty Astell; Francis L. Sullivan
- Cinematography: Alex Bryce
- Production company: British Lion
- Distributed by: Fox Film
- Release date: June 1933
- Running time: 44 minutes
- Country: United Kingdom
- Language: English

The Stickpin is a 1933 British crime film directed by Leslie S. Hiscott and starring Henry Kendall, Betty Astell and Francis L. Sullivan. It was made as a quota quickie at Beaconsfield Studios with sets were designed by Norman G. Arnold.

== Preservation status ==
The British Film Institute National Archive holds a collection of ephemera and stills but no film or video materials.

== Premise ==
A man is framed for killing the blackmailer of his friend's wife.

== Cast ==
- Henry Kendall as Paul Rayner
- Betty Astell as Eve Marshall
- Francis L. Sullivan as Jacob Volke
- Lawrence Anderson as Tom Marshall
- Henry Caine as Dixon
- F. Pope-Stamper as Simms

== Reception ==
Kine Weekly wrote: "Unpretentious British film of convenient length and good quality. The story displays invention, and its possibilities are seized by the strong cast which brings suspense and surprise to the situations. ... The story is quite ingenious, and it unfolds with straightforward conviction."

The Daily Film Renter wrote: "Competently produced short feature, distinguished by good acting and faithfully drawn settings. Clever twist provides dramatic conclusion with touch of whimsical humour. Photography and recording reach high standard, and direction keeps story moving briskly. Good supporting feature for most theatres."
