= The Bride and the Bachelor =

- Original language: English
- Written by: Ronald Millar
- Genre: Comedy

Premiere
- Date: 12 November 1956
- Place: Royal Lyceum Theatre, Edinburgh

The Bride and the Bachelor is a 1956 comedy play by the British writer Ronald Millar.

After premiering at the Royal Lyceum Theatre in Edinburgh, it transferred to the Duchess Theatre in London's West End where it ran for 589 performances between 19 December 1956 and 24 June 1958. The cast included Cicely Courtneidge, Robertson Hare, Naunton Wayne and Viola Lyel. It then went on a tour round Britain with Henry Kendall in the male lead.

== Bibliography ==
- Wearing, J.P. The London Stage 1950-1959: A Calendar of Productions, Performers, and Personnel. Rowman & Littlefield, 2014.
