= Great Stuff =

1933 film

- Directed by: Leslie S. Hiscott
- Written by: Michael Barringer; Brandon Fleming
- Produced by: Herbert Smith
- Starring: Henry Kendall; Betty Astell; Alfred Wellesley
- Production company: British Lion
- Distributed by: Fox Film
- Release date: June 1933
- Running time: 50 minutes
- Country: United Kingdom
- Language: English

Great Stuff is a 1933 British comedy film directed by Leslie S. Hiscott and starring Henry Kendall, Betty Astell and Alfred Wellesley. It was written by Michael Barringer and Brandon Fleming.

== Preservation status ==
The British Film Institute National Archive holds a collection of ephemera but no film or video materials.

== Plot ==
A woman's parents became robbers in a desperate effort to prevent her marrying an unsuitable man.

== Cast ==
- Henry Kendall as Archie Brown
- Betty Astell as Vera Montgomery
- Alfred Wellesley as Vernon Montgomery
- Barbara Gott as Claudette Montgomery
- Hal Walters as Spud
- Ernest Sefton as Captain
- Gladys Hamer as Cook

== Production ==
The film was made at Beaconsfield Studios as a quota quickie. The film's sets were designed by Norman G. Arnold.

== Reception ==
Kine Weekly wrote: "Character comedy, slight in story values, but made amusing and entertaining through the rich humorous types introduced into the narrative. The story is allowed to proceed at a useful pace, and there is an adequate meed of romantic sentiment to provide contrast and widen the appeal. Useful supporting feature, particularly for the masses."

The Daily Film Renter wrote: "Excellent performance by Henry Kendall as hero, with capital support from Betty Astell, Alfred Wellesley, Barbara Gott, Ernest Sefton, and Gladys Hamer. Amusing dialogue and below stairs interludes. Very acceptable light entertainment for popular patrons."

Picturegoer wrote: "Moderately entertaining farce is provided, not so much by the plot, which is thin, but by the characters who are introduced."
