= Hal Walters =

English actor (1892–1940)

- Born: Henry Paul Walters; 29 January 1892; South Shields, County Durham, England, UK
- Died: 7 September 1940 (aged 48); London, England, UK
- Occupation: Film actor
- Years active: 1925–1940

Henry Paul "Hal" Walters (29 January 1892 – 7 September 1940) was a British actor. He was best known for his role in The Four Feathers (1939). He was killed by a bomb in an air raid during the London Blitz.

== Selected filmography ==
- Just Plain Folks (1925)
- Mistaken Orders (1925) - Vince Barton
- Riding for Life (1925) - Bud Williams
- The Danger Zone (1925) - Jimmy Duff)
- Dangerous Traffic (1926) - Harvey Leonard
- West of the Law (1926) - Dick Walton
- Where North Holds Sway (1927) - Harvey Raine
- Tonight's the Night (1931) - Alf Hawkins
- Come Into My Parlour (1932) - Burglar
- Verdict of the Sea (1932) - Shorty
- The Last Coupon (1932) - Second in Boxing Match (uncredited)
- Old Spanish Customers (1932) - Fuller's partner in comic dance
- Little Fella (1932) - Dawes
- The River House Ghost (1932) - Walter
- Yes, Madam (1933) - Catlett
- That's My Wife (1933) - Bertie Griggs
- Going Straight (1933)
- Great Stuff (1933) - Spud
- Dora (1933, Short) - Newsagent
- Enemy of the Police (1933) - Bagshaw
- Strike It Rich (1933) - (uncredited)
- Marooned (1933) - Joe
- I'll Stick to You (1933) - Wilkins
- Keep It Quiet (1934) - Harry
- The Man I Want (1934) - Crook
- Virginia's Husband (1934) - Mechanic
- Big Business (1934) - Spike
- Crazy People (1934)
- The Man Who Knew Too Much (1934) - Postman (uncredited)
- The Perfect Flaw (1934) - Jennings
- Department Store (1935) - Sam
- The Right Age to Marry (1935) - Crowther
- Death on the Set (1935) - Albert
- A Fire Has Been Arranged (1935) - Hal
- Can You Hear Me, Mother? (1935) - Taxi Driver
- Blue Smoke (1935) - Stiffy Williams
- Mother, Don't Rush Me (1936) - Hal
- Music Hath Charms (1936) - Assistant to B.B.C. Dance Orchestra (uncredited)
- They Didn't Know (1936) - (uncredited)
- Apron Fools (1936)
- The Interrupted Honeymoon (1936) - Valet
- Where There's a Will (1936) - Nick
- Educated Evans (1936) - Nobby
- Sabotage (1936) - Man with Daughter at Aquarium (uncredited)
- Beauty and the Barge (1937) - George Porter
- Feather Your Nest (1937) - Man Outside Furniture Shop (uncredited)
- The Vulture (1937) - Stiffy Mason
- Pearls Bring Tears (1937) - Herbert
- Song of the Forge (1937) - Sam Tucker
- Strange Adventures of Mr. Smith (1937) - Lobby
- Keep Fit (1937) - Racing Tough
- Non-Stop New York (1937) - Porter (uncredited)
- Television Talent (1937) - Steve Bagley
- Little Miss Somebody (1937) - Albert Sims
- It's a Grand Old World (1937) - Jeff (uncredited)
- The Viper (1938) - Stiffy Mason
- Double or Quits (1938) - Alf
- Thank Evans (1938) - Nobby
- Meet Mr. Penny (1938) - Cecil
- Save a Little Sunshine (1938) - Stanley's Assistant (uncredited)
- Crackerjack (1938) - Smithy
- Everything Happens to Me (1938)
- Black Limelight (1939) - Rock Thrower (uncredited)
- Q Planes (1939) - Cornish Car Driver (uncredited)
- The Four Feathers (1939) - Joe
- A Girl Must Live (1939) - Barman at Party (uncredited)
- They Came by Night (1940) - Hopkins
- Hoots Mon! (1940) - Chips
- The Second Mr. Bush (1940) - Joe
- The Good Old Days (1940) - Titch
- Spies of the Air (1940) - Kingswell
- That's the Ticket (1940) - Nosey
