= Alfred Wellesley =

English actor (1872–1943)

- in The Amazing Quest of Ernest Bliss (1936)
- Born: Alfred Arthur Wells; 25 July 1872; Finsbury, London, England
- Died: 7 December 1943 (aged 71); Hinxton, Cambridgeshire, England
- Occupation: Actor

Alfred Wellesley (25 July 1872 – 7 December 1943) was an English stage and film actor.

== Partial filmography ==
- The Twelve Pound Look (1920)
- A Warm Corner (1930)
- The New Hotel (1932)
- The Lucky Number (1932)
- Here's George (1932)
- Great Stuff (1933)
- Cleaning Up (1933)
- Song at Eventide (1934)
- Death on the Set (1935)
- Annie, Leave the Room! (1935)
- The Amazing Quest of Ernest Bliss (1936)
- Museum Mystery (1937)
- Wanted! (1937)
- The Last Chance (1937)
- What a Man! (1938)
- Star of the Circus (1938)
- The Mysterious Mr. Davis (1939)
