= Cyril Fletcher =

English comedian (1913–2005)

- Born: 25 June 1913; Watford, Hertfordshire, England
- Died: 2 January 2005 (aged 91); St Peter Port, Guernsey, Channel Islands
- Education: Guildhall School of Music and Drama
- Occupations: Actor, comedian, businessman
- Spouse: Betty Astell (m. 1941)
- Children: 1

Cyril Fletcher (25 June 1913 – 2 January 2005) was an English comedian, broadcaster, pantomime impresario, actor, gardener and businessman. His catchphrase was "Pin back your lugholes". He was best known for his "Odd Odes", which later formed a section of the television show That's Life! from 1973 to 1981.

== Early life ==
Fletcher was born in Watford, the son of a solicitor, who was the Friern Barnet town clerk. Following schooling at Woodhouse School, North Finchley, where he first began to entertain by composing witty poems about his schoolmasters, he graduated from the Guildhall School of Music and Drama.

== Career ==
Fletcher first began performing the Odd Odes in 1937, long before they first appeared on television (though he did appear on pre World War II television). He developed the idea when he was short of material for a radio show. The first, Odd Ode, was a comic, yet sentimental, reading of Edgar Wallace's war poem Dreamin' of Thee. Following this broadcast, he was given a regular programme on Radio Luxembourg; it was this show that brought him to national attention. He was sometimes billed as "Cyril Fletcher, the Odd Oder".

He appeared as a panellist on the BBC programme What's My Line?, and was the presenter of Central TV's Gardening Today for fourteen years, and Channel Television's Cyril Fletcher's TV Garden, which ran for 2 years from 1990 to 1992.

A Freemason and a businessman, Fletcher believed it important to diversify in such a fickle business as show business. With his wife Betty Astell, he owned a company producing pantomimes in theatres around the country. He founded Associated Speakers, an agency for after-dinner speakers, who represented The Duke of Bedford and Lord Longford, as well as himself.

== Personal life ==
Fletcher and his wife Betty Astell were married on 18 May 1941. He died on 2 January 2005, his wife dying later that year.

== Selected filmography ==
- Yellow Canary (1943)
- Nicholas Nickleby (1947)
- A Piece of Cake (1948)
