= Tons of Trouble =

1956 British film by Leslie S. Hiscott

- Opening titles
- Directed by: Leslie S. Hiscott
- Written by: Richard Hearne; Leslie S. Hiscott
- Based on: a story by John Barrow
- Produced by: Richard Hearne; Elizabeth Hiscott
- Starring: Richard Hearne; William Hartnell; Austin Trevor
- Cinematography: Norman Warwick
- Edited by: Carmen Beliaeff
- Music by: Elizabeth Hiscott
- Production company: Shaftesbury Films
- Distributed by: Renown Pictures Corporation (UK)
- Release date: 1956
- Running time: 77 minutes
- Country: United Kingdom
- Language: English

Tons of Trouble is a 1956 British black and white comedy film directed by Leslie S. Hiscott and starring Richard Hearne, William Hartnell and Austin Trevor. It was written by Hearne and Hiscott based on a story by John Barrow.

== Plot ==
The eccentric caretaker of a block of flats, Mr. Pastry, is in charge of two of its boilers, whom he lovingly calls "Mavis" and "Ethel." His affection for the pair leads him into unforeseen problems, and he's fired from his job. Meanwhile, wealthy Sir Hervey Shaw is searching for Mr. Pastry to close an important business deal. Mr. Pastry is found just in the nick of time to save both Sir Hervey's deal, and the temperamental "Ethel", who is on the verge of exploding.

== Cast ==
- Richard Hearne as Mr. Pastry
- William Hartnell as Bert
- Austin Trevor as Sir Hervey Shaw
- Joan Marion as Angela Shaw
- Robert Moreton as Jevons
- Ralph Truman as Inspector Bridger
- Ronald Adam as psychiatrist
- Junia Crawford as Diana Little
- Tony Quinn as Cracknell
- John Stuart as doctor
- Yvonne Hearne as matron
- Angela Proctor as Sir Hervey's secretary
- William Mervyn as Roberts (MI5)
- Neil Wilson as Milligan
- John Raikes as Sir Hervey's male secretary
- Mary Calnan as B.E.A. girl
- Sylvia Bidmead as Swissair girl
- Cyril Rennison as plain clothes policeman
- Harrington Brian as police doctor
- John Adams as policeman

== Critical reception ==
The Monthly Film Bulletin wrote: "Ingenuous but spirited farce, with Richard Hearne in his usual form as the comically pathetic Mr. Pastry. But it is the boilers, notably the temperamental Mavis, that steal the limelight."

Kine Weekly wrote: "Homely, disarmingly ingenuous slapstick comedy. ... The majority of the laughs are telegraphed: but by weighting the scales in the little man's favour it gives a new slant to familiar situations. Richard Hearne clowns effectively in the lead and the supporting cast and staging, too, are up to scratch."

TV Guide wrote, "Surprisingly, this offbeat story works with some good humor, the elements mixing with effectiveness."
