= That's My Wife (1933 film) =

1933 comedy film by Leslie S. Hiscott

- Davy Burnaby and Betty Astell in the film.
- Directed by: Leslie S. Hiscott
- Written by: Michael Barringer
- Story by: William C. Stone
- Produced by: Herbert Smith
- Starring: Claud Allister; Frank Pettingell; Betty Astell
- Cinematography: Alex Bryce
- Production company: British Lion
- Distributed by: British Lion (UK)
- Release dates: March 1933 (London, UK)
- Running time: 67 minutes
- Country: United Kingdom
- Language: English

That's My Wife is a 1933 British comedy film directed by Leslie S. Hiscott and starring Claud Allister, Frank Pettingell, Betty Astell and Davy Burnaby. It was written by Michael Barringer, and made as a quota quickie at Beaconsfield Studios. The film's art direction was by Norman G. Arnold.

== Preservation status ==
The British Film Institute National Archive holds a collection of stills but no film or video materials.

== Plot ==
Philandering Yorkshire businessman Josiah Crump has an affair with Lillian Harbottle, the attractive young wife of the impoverished Major Harbottle. Suspicious, the Major hires a private detective. Seeking a way out of his predicament, Crump asks his nephew Archie Trevor to devise a scheme. Trevor stages a scene where Crump is found embracing a different woman, hoping to mislead the Major. The plot backfires when the woman Archie has recruited turns out to be the private detective's wife. A chaotic series of misunderstandings follows.

== Cast ==
- Claud Allister as Archie Trevor
- Frank Pettingell as Josiah Crump
- Betty Astell as Lillian Harbottle
- Davy Burnaby as Major Harbottle
- Helga Moray as Queenie Sleeman
- Hal Walters as Bertie Griggs
- Thomas Weguelin as Mr. Sleeman
- Jack Vyvian as Sam Griggs

== Reception ==
The Daily Film Renter wrote: "Bright direction invests plot with 'snap,' while piquant situations follow each other with lightning speed to entertaining climax that presents roué in milk bath with sundry bathing belles. Amusing and often sophisticated dialogue well put over by competent cast."

Picture Show wrote: "Leslie Hiscott is to be congratulated on having directed the most brilliant comedy ever turned out of a British studio. That's My Wife is a triumph for this clever director, for the British Lion Film Corporation, Limited, and for the brilliant artistes who have taken part in this most entertaining production."

Film Weekly wrote: "Incoherent and often silly farce about a provincial businessman's amorous adventures on holiday. Rambling, hopelessly complicated and with no real point, Claude Allister is thrown away on a stupid part. The twists and elaborations inserted in the effort to make a story where none exists make That's My Wife impossible to outline."
