= The Night Club Queen =

1934 film directed by Bernard Vorhaus

- Directed by: Bernard Vorhaus
- Written by: Anthony Kimmins (play); H. Fowler Mear
- Produced by: Julius Hagen
- Starring: Mary Clare; Jane Carr; Lewis Shaw
- Music by: W.L. Trytel
- Production company: Real Art Productions
- Distributed by: Universal Pictures
- Release date: 22 March 1934
- Running time: 80 minutes
- Country: United Kingdom
- Language: English

The Night Club Queen is a 1934 British musical mystery film directed by Bernard Vorhaus and starring Mary Clare, Jane Carr and Lewis Shaw. It was written by Anthony Kimmins and H. Fowler Mear, and made at Twickenham Studios in London with sets designed by art director James A. Carter.

== Plot ==
The story is told in flashback. To pay for her son's Oxford education, Mary Brown invests in a teashop, which turns into a seedy nightclub. She ends up on a murder charge, defended in court by her husband.

== Cast ==
- Mary Clare as Mary Brown
- Jane Carr as Bobbie Lamont
- Lewis Shaw as Peter Brown
- Lewis Casson as Edward Brown
- George Carney as Hale
- Merle Tottenham as Alice Lamont
- Drusilla Wills as Aggie
- Syd Crossley as Jimmy
- Felix Aylmer as Prosecution
- The Sherman Fisher Girls as dancers
- Desmond Tester as messenger boy in nightclub

== Reception ==
The Daily Film Renter wrote: "Painstakingly directed, film moves well, save for one or two overlong emotional sequences that drag. Spacious night club interiors are principal background. Songs by Jane Carr and dancing by Sherman Fisher girls embellish main theme. Lewis Shaw takes honours as juvenile lead in performance of distinct promise. Picture ranks as acceptable popular fare. To describe this film as a 'musical drama' is not strictly accurate. Actually it is a drama into which half a dozen songs are introduced during scenes in a night club."

Picturegoer wrote: "Direction is generally good, but the continuity is a little ragged. Camerawork is efficient and the atmosphere generally convincing."
