= Death on the Set =

1935 British film by Leslie S. Hiscott

- Opening titles
- Directed by: Leslie S. Hiscott
- Written by: Michael Barringer
- Based on: novel by Victor MacLure
- Produced by: Julius Hagen
- Starring: Henry Kendall; Eve Gray; Jeanne Stuart; Garry Marsh
- Cinematography: William Luff; Ernest Palmer
- Edited by: Ralph Kemplen
- Music by: W.L. Trytel
- Production company: Twickenham Studios
- Distributed by: Universal Pictures
- Release date: 29 July 1935
- Running time: 73 minutes
- Country: United Kingdom
- Language: English

Death on the Set (U.S. title: Murder on the Set) is a 1935 British mystery film directed by Leslie S. Hiscott and starring Henry Kendall, Eve Gray, Jeanne Stuart and Wally Patch. It was written by Michael Barringer based on the novel by Victor MacLure. The film was a quota quickie produced at Twickenham Studios by Julius Hagen for distribution by Universal Pictures.

The plot concerns a film director who murders a leading gangster and takes his place, later pinning the killing on a prominent actress.

== Plot ==
Film director Cayley Morden has a double, the gangster Charlie Marsh. Cayley plans to murder Charlie, assume his identity, and start a new life overseas. Cayley arranges with Charlie's lover, the actress Laura Cane, to give him an alibi, but she is murdered by Charlie. Cayley kills Charlie. When he is arrested, he faces a choice: if he is Cayley, he will be tried for the murder of Charlie; but if he is Charlie, he will be tried for the murder of Laura.

== Cast ==
- Henry Kendall as Cayley Morden / Charlie Marsh
- Eve Gray as Laura Cane
- Jeanne Stuart as Lady Blanche
- Garry Marsh as Inspector Burford
- Wally Patch as Sergeant Crowther
- Lewis Shaw as Jimmy Frayle
- Alfred Wellesley as studio manager
- Ben Welden as Freshman
- Rita Halsam as Constance Lyon
- Robert Nainby as Lord Umbridge
- Hal Walters as Albert
- Elizabeth Arkell as Mrs. Hipkin

== Reception ==
Kine Weekly wrote: "There is a good deal of ingenuity in this murder story, based on a novel by Victor McClure, but as in most cases of plots relying on the perfect double, it lacks full conviction and has some rather naive sequences. The acting of the principals is very good, however even if it is not too well supported by the entire cast, and there are strongly dramatic moments as well as good comedy."

The Daily Film Renter wrote: "Staged mostly in film studio settings the picture is rather loosely presented, but there is a fair quota of robust melodrama, even though conviction is not always secured. The climax is fairly obvious about half-way through the action."
