= A Tight Corner =

1932 film

- Gina Malo and Frank Pettingell in the film
- Directed by: Leslie S. Hiscott
- Written by: Michael Barringer
- Produced by: Julius Hagen
- Starring: Frank Pettingell; Gina Malo; Betty Astell; Charles Stratton
- Cinematography: Sydney Blythe
- Production company: Real Art Productions
- Distributed by: Metro-Goldwyn-Mayer
- Release date: 1932
- Running time: 49 minutes
- Country: United Kingdom
- Language: English

A Tight Corner is a 1932 British comedy film directed by Leslie S. Hiscott and starring Frank Pettingell, Gina Malo, Betty Astell and Charles Stratton. It was written by Michael Barringer and made at Twickenham Studios as a quota quickie for release by MGM.

== Preservation status ==
The British Film Institute National Archive holds no stills or ephemera, and no film or video materials.

== Plot ==
Tony Titmouse and Oswald Blenkinsop are private inquiry agents, employed by Baron Yodel to recover incriminating letters from himself to Madame Ginkenstein, manager of a physical culture school. The agents pose as PT instructors to gain access to the school, and set about retrieving the letters.

== Cas ==
- Harold French as Tony Titmouse
- Frank Pettingell as Oswald Blenkinsop
- Gina Malo
- Betty Astell
- Charles Stratton
- Charles Farrell
- Madeleine Gibson as woman

== Reception ==
Kine Weekly wrote: "A thin British comedy which falls back on old situations and ripe innuendos for its laughs, which are conspicuously few. The leading players do their best to enliven the proceedings, and the technical qualities are good, but the film still remains a very indifferent effort ... Frank Pettingell, the ample North-country comedian, cuts an amusing figure as Blenkinsop and gets away with some suggestive lines. ... This comedy, part leg show and part farce, is dispensed from a very old formula, and the gags and situations are too threadbare to raise a laugh except from the unsophisticated, who may appreciate the ripe lines."
