= Herbert Smith (producer) =

British film producer (1901–1986)

Herbert Smith (30 June 1901 – 3 February 1986) was a British film producer and director. He produced 69 films (including the majority of his director-credited films), for Denham Film Studios and British Lion Films from 1933 to 1963, including the war film They Were Not Divided in 1950.

== Early life ==
He was born on 30 June 1901 in London.

== Career ==
He started in production with G.B. Samuelson. He joined Paramount British for the production of The Officer's Mess. In 1932 went to work for his elder brother Sam at British Lion Films. He served as assistant director on The Frightened Lady, The Calendar, Whiteface, There Goes the Bride, Sally Bishop, The Ringer and King of the Ritz. He was an assistant director on five films between 1930 and 1933, before the first 13 for which he was director (the last of them in 1940).

Smith started to direct in 1930 with On The Air, In Town Tonight, Soft Lights and Sweet Music, Calling all Stars, It's a Grand Old World, Leave it to Me, and He's Got Everything, In 1938, he directed I've Got a Horse, Around the Town, Home from Home and in 1939, All at Sea.

At this time he was the production supervisor at Beaconsfield Studios. Smith often kept his name off the credits. As Executive in charge of Production, many films he controlled while at Denham Studios were uncredited, such as Henry V and Hamlet both with Laurence Olivier. In 1956 Smith was called by Sidney Box, who asked if he would make a movie about Rock 'n' Roll. This led to The Tommy Steele Story, with music by Lionel Bart – his first movie score. Smith followed up with television series 6.5 Special, featuring pop stars of the period. His last film was Too Young to Love with Thomas Mitchell in 1960.

He died on 4 February 1986 in Ramsgate, Kent.

== Selected filmography ==
=== Producer ===
- This Is the Life (1933)
- That's My Wife (1933)
- Strike It Rich (1933)
- I'll Stick to You (1933)
- Great Stuff (1933)
- Cleaning Up (1933)
- Marooned (1933)
- Yes, Madam (1933)
- The Stickpin (1933)
- Keep It Quiet (1934)
- Crazy People (1934)
- The Man I Want (1934)
- Without You (1934)
- Gay Love (1934)
- Flat Number Three (1934)
- Passing Shadows (1934)
- Line Engaged (1935)
- Marry the Girl (1935)
- The Big Splash (1935)
- The Interrupted Honeymoon (1936)
- It's You I Want (1936)
- A Wife or Two (1936)
- Jury's Evidence (1936)
- Fine Feathers (1937)
- Variety Hour (1937)
- Return of the Frog (1938)
- Around the Town (1938)
- Mr. Emmanuel (1944)
- Men of Two Worlds (1946)
- The Faithful City (1952)
- The Tommy Steele Story (1957)
- The Truth About Women (1957)
- Cat Girl (1957)
- The 6.5 Special (1958)
- Too Young to Love (1960)

=== Director ===
- On the Air (1934)
- Night Mail (1935)
- In Town Tonight (1935)
- Soft Lights and Sweet Music (1936)
- Calling All Stars (1937)
- It's a Grand Old World (1937)
- I've Got a Horse (1938)
- Around the Town (1938)
- All at Sea (1940)
