= Millions (1936 film) =

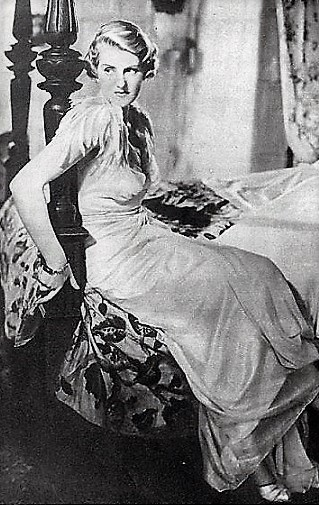
- Cropped publicity still of Carr in Millions, published in the 25 July 1936 issue of Picturegoer
- Directed by: Leslie Hiscott
- Written by: Michael Barringer
- Produced by: Herbert Wilcox
- Starring: Gordon Harker; Frank Pettingell; Richard Hearne
- Cinematography: Francis Carver; Freddie Young
- Edited by: Frederick Wilson
- Music by: Geraldo
- Production company: Herbert Wilcox Productions
- Distributed by: General Film Distributors
- Release date: 1936
- Running time: 70 minutes
- Country: United Kingdom
- Language: English

Millions (also known as The King of Cloves) is a 1936 British comedy film directed by Leslie Hiscott and starring Gordon Harker, Richard Hearne and Frank Pettingell. It was made at Elstree Studios. The film portrays the cut-throat rivalry between two financiers.

== Plot ==
Wealthy businessman and financier Otto Forbes has cut off his son Jimmy's allowance. Jimmy's valet Parsons comes up with a scheme to restore Jimmy to his father's good graces. The elder Forbes loves music, so Parsons suggests Jimmy "compose" a beautiful piece. Since Jimmy has no musical talent or training, Parsons tries to pass off works, such as a Beethoven sonata, as Jimmy's, but Forbes is not fooled, leaving Jimmy in deep financial trouble.

Forbes and bitter business rival Sir Charles Rimmer are running against each for Parliament. Jimmy meets and becomes enamoured with Rimmer's daughter, Jane.

== Cast ==
- Gordon Harker as Otto Forbes
- Frank Pettingell as Sir Charles Rimmer
- Richard Hearne as Jimmy Forbes
- Stuart Robertson as the conductor
- Anthony Holles as Billy Todd
- Jack Hobbs as Parsons
- Ernest Sefton as Naseby
- Alexander Field as the brokers' man
- Queenie Leonard as Lilian
- Jane Carr as Jane Rimmer

== Reception ==
The Monthly Film Bulletin wrote: "The supporting cast are adequate, and Ellen Pollock gives a good performance as Otto's secretary. The direction is untidy and the photography is often poor. The musical items are badly recorded and this spoils the Victorian duet by Ellen Pollock and Gordon Harker. But it is Gordon Harker's film and he is worth every foot of it."

Picture Show wrote: "Thoroughly entertaining comedy which not only has clever characterisations but a good story. Gordon Harker is a sheer joy as the self-made man, with a glorious accent; Frank Pettingell also scores as his rival, and it is the team work of these two that dominates the entire film. Nevertheless, excellent work comes from the supporting cast. It is well directed, set and photographed, and amply repays a visit."
