= Jay Laurier =

English actor (1879–1969)

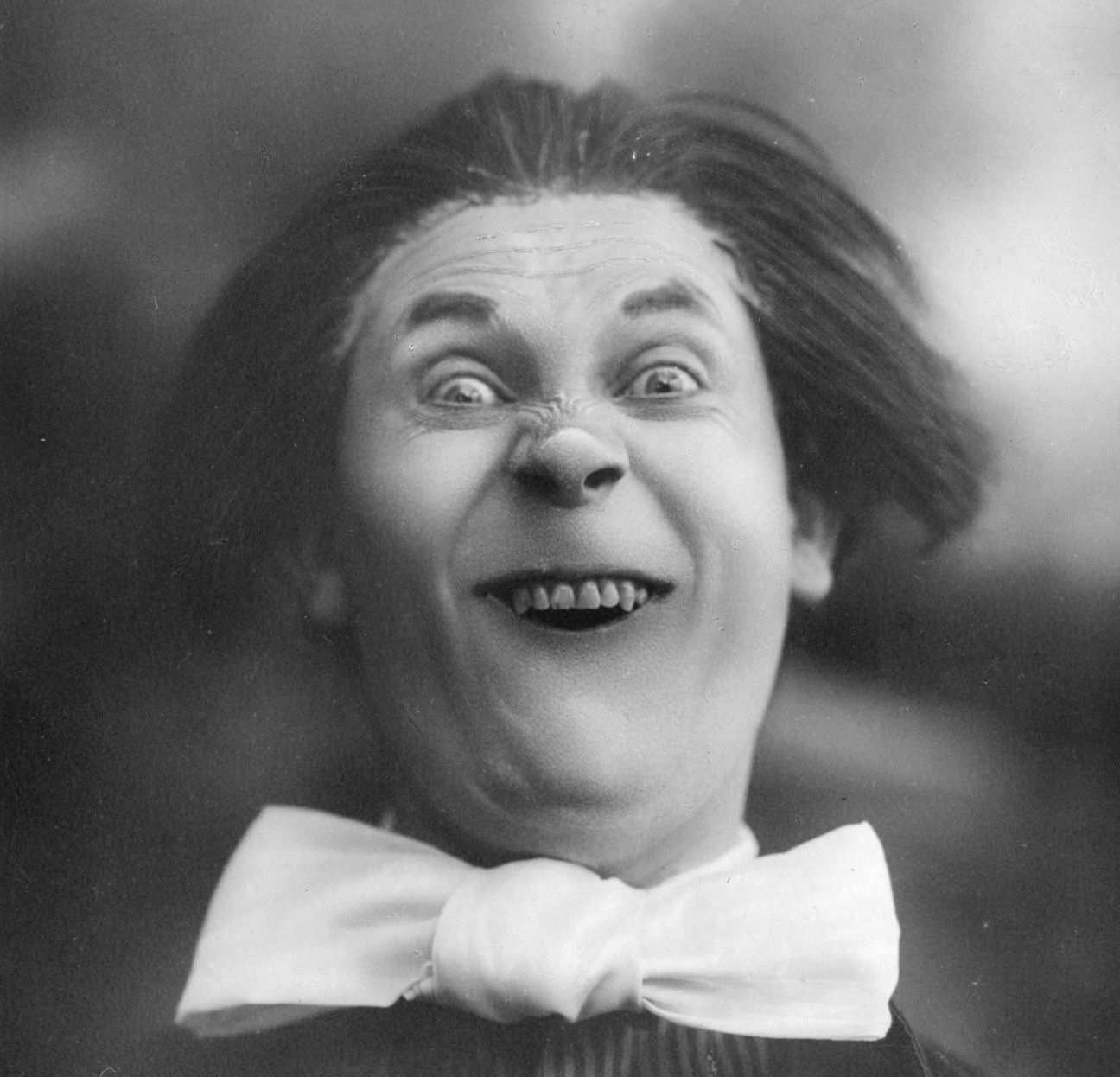
Jay Laurier as Gregory in Tom Jones (1907)

James Alexander Chapman (31 March 1879 – 8 April 1969), known by his stage name, Jay Laurier, was an English actor. Early in his career he was a music hall performer, but by the late 1930s he was playing in the works of Shakespeare at the Shakespeare Memorial Theatre in Stratford-upon-Avon as well as having a career in films.

== Early career ==
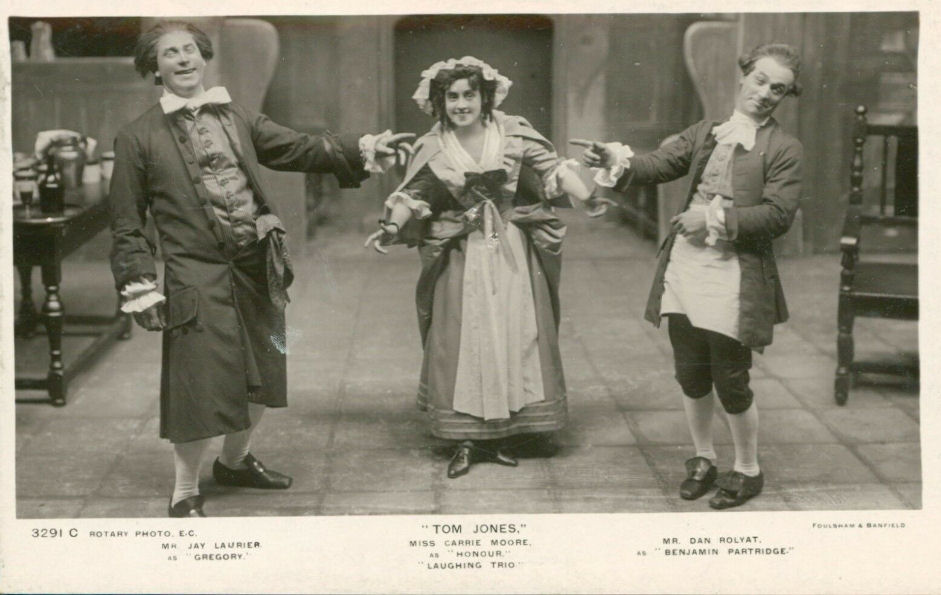
Laurier (left) Carrie Moore and Dan Rolyat in Tom Jones (1907)

Laurier was born in 1879 in Birmingham in Warwickshire. He made his professional debut in Arabian Nights at the Abertillery Public Hall in 1896 before beginning a successful career touring the music halls of Britain.

As a music hall artiste he popularised such songs as "Ring O' Roses" and "I'm Always Doing Something Silly". From December 1906, he was in the pantomime Red Riding Hood at the New Theatre in Cardiff. His first performance on the legitimate stage was as Gregory in the comic opera Tom Jones in 1907. Christmas 1907 saw him in the pantomime Mother Goose as Jack opposite the dame of Wilkie Bard at the Prince of Wales Theatre in Birmingham. In 1922 he played Miffins in the pantomime Jack and the Beanstalk at the Hippodrome, London opposite George Robey as Dame Trot. A Freemason, in 1919 he joined the Chelsea Lodge No 3098 the members of which were from the entertainment industry. Laurier was Meander in the musical comedy Phi-Phi at the London Pavilion (1922) and Pamphylos in the operetta Cleopatra (an adaptation of Die Perlen der Cleopatra (1923) by Oscar Straus) opposite Evelyn Laye in the title role at Daly's Theatre (1925). He was in the British production of the musical Oh, Kay! at Her Majesty's Theatre (1927); was Rudolph the Reckless in the pantomime The Sleeping Beauty at the Theatre Royal, Drury Lane (1929–1930); Nisch in The Merry Widow at the Hippodrome, London (1932), and toured as Popoff in the latter show during 1936. During the 1930s and 40s he acted in a number of films.

== Shakespeare at Stratford ==
He joined the company of The Old Vic in 1937 for whom he played Alfred Doolittle in Pygmalion before joining the company of the Shakespeare Memorial Theatre in Stratford-upon-Avon in 1938 for whom he played Launce in The Two Gentlemen of Verona (1938), Bottom in A Midsummer Night's Dream (1938 and 1942), Touchstone in As You Like It (1929–1942), First Gravedigger in Hamlet (1940 and 1942), Porter in Macbeth (1938 and 1942), Pompey in Measure for Measure (1939–1940), Gardener in Richard II (1941), Sir John Falstaff in The Merry Wives of Windsor (1940), Autolycus in The Winter's Tale (1942), Christopher Sly The Taming of the Shrew (1939–1942), Stephano in The Tempest (1938–1942) and Sir Toby Belch in Twelfth Night (1941). Laurier played Christopher Sly in The Taming of the Shrew, Sir Toby Belch in Twelfth Night and Dogberry in Much Ado About Nothing in the Stratford Shakespeare season at the Kingsway Theatre in London. In 1945 he gave an acclaimed cameo performance as the jailer Frosch in Gay Rosalinda at the Palace Theatre in London. He reprised the role of Sir Toby Belch at the Savoy Theatre in London in 1947.

== Personal life and death ==
In 1901, he married Elizabeth Mary Smith and with her had three children: Leslie James Chapman (born 1902), Sybil Constance Chapman (1903–04) and Marjorie Laurier Chapman (born 1908). They divorced in 1909 after he had abandoned her and his family to live with the married music hall performer Ouida MacDermott whose own husband divorced her in 1910 because of her adultery with Laurier. He married Muriel S. Griffin in 1932 and Sybil Viney.

On retiring in 1956, Jay Laurier moved to Durban in South Africa, where he died in 1969, aged 90.

== Selected filmography ==
- Hobson's Choice (1931)
- Pyjamas Preferred (1932)
- I'll Stick to You (1933)
- Waltz Time (1933)
- The Black Tulip (1937)
- Oh Boy! (1938)
- The History of Mr. Polly (1949)
