= Cleaning Up (1933 film) =

1933 British film by Leslie S. Hiscott

- Opening titles
- Directed by: Leslie S. Hiscott
- Written by: Michael Barringer
- Produced by: Herbert Smith
- Starring: George K. Gee; Betty Astell; Davy Burnaby
- Cinematography: Alex Bryce
- Production company: British Lion
- Distributed by: British Lion Films; Veneficus Films
- Release date: May 1933
- Running time: 70 minutes
- Country: United Kingdom
- Language: English

Cleaning Up is a 1933 British comedy film directed by Leslie S. Hiscott and starring George K. Gee, Betty Astell and Davy Burnaby. It was written by Michael Barringer and made at Beaconsfield Studios as a quota quickie with sets designed by Norman G. Arnold.

== Plot ==
Lord Pumpford's son Tony refuses to follow the usual family tradition of marrying money, and finds a job as a vacuum cleaner salesman, where he meets actress Marion Brent. His father's friend Sir Rickaby Rudd is interested in Marion, and to allay his wife's suspicions, he tricks Tony into pretending to be her husband. Farcical events follow, ending with Tony winning Marion.

== Cast ==
- George K. Gee as Tony Pumpford
- Betty Astell as Marian Brent
- Davy Burnaby as Lord Pumpford
- Barbara Gott as Lady Rudd
- Alfred Wellesley as Sir Rickaby Rudd
- Muriel George as Mrs. Hoggenheim
- Joan Matheson as Angela
- Dorothy Vernon as Agatha
- The Max Rivers Girls as The Chorus Girls
- Rona Ricardo

== Reception ==
Kine Weekly wrote: "Lively farcical comedy, pleasing irresponsible nonsense put over by the tireless versatility of George Gee, who cleverly adapts his experienced stage technique to the requirements of the screen. The humour is maintained at an even tempo, and there are a sufficient number of bright and original gags to score the necessary complement of laughs. Good team work is furnished by a cast of established favourites, and the quality of the production leaves nothing to be desired."

The Daily Film Renter wrote: "Farce that is really funny ... George Gee, carrying the main role, brings a vivid personality into British films, and keeps fun going the whole time. He is backed by good all-round team, with the result that the film moves slickly from one comedy climax to the next. A real laugh and a safe bet for all showmen."
