= A Wife or Two =

- Trade advertisement
- Directed by: Maclean Rogers
- Written by: Kathleen Butler; Roland Daniel (play); C.B. Poultney (play); Maclean Rogers
- Produced by: Herbert Smith
- Starring: Henry Kendall; Nancy Burne; Betty Astell
- Production company: British Lion Films
- Distributed by: British Lion Films
- Release date: 10 January 1936
- Running time: 63 minutes
- Country: United Kingdom
- Language: English

A Wife or Two is a 1936 British comedy film directed by Maclean Rogers and starring Henry Kendall, Nancy Burne and Betty Astell. It was written by Kathleen Butler and Rogers, based on the play by Roland Daniel and C.B. Poultney. It was made as a quota quickie at Beaconsfield Studios.

== Preservation status ==
The British Film Institute National Archive holds the film.

== Scenario ==
A young woman poses as her divorced husband's wife, in order to persuade her wealthy uncle to help recover a fortune lost in an investment in a gold mine.

== Cast ==
- Henry Kendall as Charles Marlowe
- Nancy Burne as Margaret Marlowe
- Betty Astell as Mary Hamilton
- Fred Duprez as Sam Hickleberry
- Garry Marsh as George Hamilton
- Ena Grossmith
- Wally Patch
- Leo Sheffield

== Reception ==
The Monthly Film Bulletin wrote: "The obvious and conventional story makes no attempt at originality. The director relies for his laughs on familiar incidents and situations put over with vigour and spirit by an energetic team of competent actors."

Kine Weekly wrote: "If the action is sometimes overpowered by dialogue, the situations, nevertheless, are ingenious and work up to a satisfactorily hilarious pitch. A useful light quota well calculated to supplement a serious programme."

The Daily Film Renter wrote: "Cast play with hearty vigour, and subject, developed on robust lines, affords sound entertainment of definitely popular calibre. This is one of those pictures where credulity is flung to the winds and laughter takes the stage."
