= The Iron Stair (1933 film) =

1933 film

- Dorothy Boyd and Michael Hogan in the film
- Directed by: Leslie S. Hiscott
- Written by: H. Fowler Mear
- Based on: novel by Eliza Humphreys (as "Rita")
- Produced by: Julius Hagen
- Starring: Henry Kendall; Michael Hogan; Dorothy Boyd; Michael Sherbrooke
- Production company: Twickenham Studios
- Distributed by: Radio Pictures
- Release date: January 1933
- Running time: 51 minutes (UK)
- Country: United Kingdom
- Language: English

The Iron Stair is a 1933 British crime film directed by Leslie S. Hiscott and starring Henry Kendall, Dorothy Boyd and Michael Hogan. It was written by H. Fowler Mear based on the 1921 novel of the same title by Eliza Humphreys (as "Rita"), and was a quota quickie produced by Twickenham Studios. The novel had previously been filmed in 1920.

== Preservation status ==
The British Film Institute National Archive holds a collection of stills but no film or video materials.

== Plot ==
George and Geoffrey Gale are twin brothers, identical in appearance but very different in character. George forges his father's name on a £1,000 cheque, but it is Geoffrey who is convicted and sentenced to five years in prison. The family's lawyer, together with a moneylender, establish the truth, and Geoffrey is exonerated.

== Cast ==
- Henry Kendall as Geoffrey Gale / George Gale
- Dorothy Boyd as Eva Marshall
- Michael Hogan as Pat Derringham
- Michael Sherbrooke as Benjamin Marks
- Steffi Duna as Elsa Damond
- A. Bromley Davenport as Sir Andrew Gale
- Victor Stanley as Ben
- Charles Paton as Sloan
- John Turnbull as Major Gordon

== Reception ==
The Daily Film Renter wrote: "Henry Kendall gives adequate performances in dual role. Situations lack conviction owing to sketchiness of story. Excellent photography. Supporting feature for popular patrons. ... Leslie Hiscott's direction is on straightforward lines."

Picturegoer wrote: "It is put over in true melodramatic style without any frills and is technically efficient. Henry Kendall plays a dual role of twin brothers, one a waster and the other a straight young fellow who goes to prison for his brother's crime. He contrasts the types well."
