= Alex Bryce =

British screenwriter, cinematographer and film director (1905–1961)

Alex Bryce (1905–1961) was a British screenwriter, cinematographer and film director.

== Selected filmography ==
Director

- Sexton Blake and the Mademoiselle (1935)
- Wedding Group (1936)
- Servants All (1936)
- The Big Noise (1936)
- The End of the Road (1936)
- Against the Tide (1937)
- The Black Tulip (1937)
- The Londonderry Air (1938)
- My Irish Molly (1938)
- The Last Barricade (1938)

=== Cinematographer ===
- The Ringer (1931)
- The Sport of Kings (1931)
- Sally in Our Alley (1931)
- The Old Man (1931)
- A Honeymoon Adventure (1931)
- Sally Bishop (1932)
- That's My Wife (1933)
- The Stickpin (1933)
- Cleaning Up (1933)
- This Is the Life (1933)
- On the Air (1934)
- Passing Shadows (1934)
- Gay Love (1934)
- Without You (1934)
- Flat Number Three (1934)
- Blue Smoke (1935)
- Late Extra (1935)
- His Majesty and Company (1935)
- Ten Minute Alibi (1935)
- The Deputy Drummer (1935)
