= That's My Uncle =

- Directed by: George Pearson
- Written by: Michael Barringer
- Based on: play by Frederick J. Jackson
- Produced by: Julius Hagen
- Starring: Mark Daly; Richard Cooper; Betty Astell
- Cinematography: Ernest Palmer
- Production company: Julius Hagen Productions
- Distributed by: Universal Pictures
- Release date: March 1935
- Running time: 58 minutes
- Country: United Kingdom
- Language: English

That's My Uncle (also known as The Iron Woman) is a 1935 British comedy film directed by George Pearson and starring Mark Daly, Richard Cooper and Betty Astell. It was written by Michael Barringer based on the 1932 play The Iron Woman by Frederick J. Jackson, and was made at Twickenham Studios as a quota quickie for release by Universal Pictures.

== Synopsis ==
Walter Frisby is henpecked by his wife Hannah, and for a break escapes to London. He is framed by crooks and masquerades as a butler to evade arrest. The crooks, being pursued by Arthur, Walter's would-be crime reporter nephew, are keen to rob the household in which Walter is hiding out. Hannah then arrives on the scene.

== Cast ==
- Mark Daly as Walter Frisbee
- Richard Cooper as Arthur Twindle
- Betty Astell as Maudie
- Margaret Yarde as Mrs. Frisbee
- Michael Shepley as Chrlie Cookson
- Wally Patch as Splinty Woods
- David Horne as Col. Marlowe
- Hope Davy as Betty Marlowe
- Ralph Truman as Monty
- Gladys Hamer
- Colin Lesslie

== Reception ==
Kine Weekly wrote: "A purposeless potpouri of crime, romance and humour, loosely held together by a slight and far from clear story. The thin plot becomes so unnecessarily involved as it develops that it soon reaches the stage when the straightening out process becomes an impossibility, hence the abrupt and indefinite ending."

The Daily Film Renter wrote: "Involved comedy of crooks, errant husband, young lovers and silly-ass hero. Complicated situations give rise to fair comedy, but there are dull moments, and climax falls flat. Chief appeal lies in amusing characterisations by Mark Daly and Margaret Yarde. Direction makes most of farcical incidents, but story never really grips."
