= Passing Shadows =

- Directed by: Leslie S. Hiscott
- Written by: Michael Barringer
- Produced by: Herbert Smith
- Starring: Edmund Gwenn; Barry MacKay; Aileen Marson
- Cinematography: Alex Bryce
- Production company: British Lion
- Distributed by: Fox Film
- Release date: 2 May 1934
- Running time: 67 minutes
- Country: United Kingdom
- Language: English

Passing Shadows is a 1934 British mystery film directed by Leslie S. Hiscott and starring Edmund Gwenn, Barry MacKay and Aileen Marson. it was written by Michael Barringer.

== Plot ==
During a train journey, chemist Jim Lawrence is attacked by a pick-pocket and thinks that during the ensuing struggle he has accidentallty shot the villain dead. Terrified, he keeps quiet about the affair, but eventually confesses to the police. He then discovers that he has been used by the robber as part of a ruse.

== Cast ==
- Edmund Gwenn as David Lawrence
- Barry MacKay as Jim Lawrence
- Aileen Marson as Mary Willett
- D. A. Clarke-Smith as stranger
- Viola Lyel as Mrs. Willett
- Wally Patch as Sergeant
- John Turnbull as Inspector Goodall
- Barbara Everest as Mrs. Lawrence
- Beatrice Marsden as Mrs. Smith

== Production ==
The film was made as Beaconsfield Studios as a quota quickie with sets designed by Norman G. Arnold.

== Reception ==
The Daily Film Renter wrote: "Uninspired direction, development somewhat improbable and denouement far-fetched. Gwenn convincing as father, but remainder of cast prone to overact. Eventual straightening out of tangle should, however, be to liking of less critical audiences, film qualifying as adequate second feature for small provincial halls."

Kine Weekly wrote: "The plot of this crime drama certainly reveals ingenuity, but the leisurely treatment prevents it from registering as it should. It is pieced together so deliberately that the mind of the audience outstrips the action, consequently a good deal of suspense is lost. That which remains, however, has some dramatic quality, sufficient to carry the film into the two-feature programme class."

Picturegoer wrote: "There is a certain amount of ingenuity in this story ... It is, however, much too slowly developed, and the treatment renders the workings of the plot too transparent to grip to any extent. Barry Mackay is fair as the chemist, and Edmund Gwenn gives a sound characterisation as his father. As the robber, D. A. Clarke Smith is well cast, and Aileen Marson is quite effective as the chemist's fiancée. The best work of all comes from Wally Patch – as an over-enthusiastic and dumb police sergeant."
