= Charles Paton =

English actor (1874–1970)

- in Blackmail (1929)
- Born: Charles Ernest Paton; 31 July 1874; London, England
- Died: 10 April 1970 (aged 95); London, England
- Occupation: Actor
- Years active: 1927–1952

Charles Ernest Paton (31 July 1874 – 10 April 1970) was an English film actor. He joined the circus at 14, and had early stage and music hall experience. He appeared in more than 100 films between 1927 and 1952, including Freedom of the Seas. In 1927, he appeared in a short film, made in the DeForest Phonofilm sound-on-film process, singing "If Your Face Wants to Smile, We'll Let It In" from the revue John Citizen's Lament. He was born in London and died from a heart attack, also in London.

== Selected filmography ==
- Blackmail (1929, UK), Alfred Hitchcock's first sound film
- The Feather (1929)
- The W Plan (1930)
- What a Night! (1931)
- The Sleeping Cardinal (1931)
- The Lyons Mail (1931)
- The Great Gay Road (1931)
- Stepping Stones (1931)
- The Girl in the Night (1931)
- Glamour (1931)
- The Spare Room (1932)
- Rynox (1932)
- Josser Joins the Navy (1932)
- The Third String (1932)
- The Love Nest (1933)
- This Acting Business (1933)
- Too Many Wives (1933)
- The Iron Stair (1933)
- The Girl in Possession (1934)
- Freedom of the Seas (1934)
- Song at Eventide (1934)
- Girls Will Be Boys (1934)
- No Monkey Business (1935)
- Once in a New Moon (1935)
- When Knights Were Bold (1936)
- The Prisoner of Corbal (1936)
- Jury's Evidence (1936)
- The Vandergilt Diamond Mystery (1936)
- Museum Mystery (1937)
- Rhythm Racketeer (1937)
- The Dominant Sex (1937)
- Missing, Believed Married (1937)
- The Ware Case (1938)
- Double or Quits (1938)
- Men Without Honour (1939)
- The Body Vanished (1939)
- The Four Just Men (1939)
- Three Silent Men (1940)
- "Pimpernel" Smith (1941)
- Escape Dangerous (1947)
- Woman to Woman (1947)
- Celia (1949)
- The Man from Yesterday (1949)
- The Girl Who Couldn't Quite (1950)
- Once a Sinner (1950)
- Portrait of Clare (1950)
- The Adventurers (1951)
- 13 East Street (1952)
