= Billets (film) =

1925 British film by Leslie S. Hiscott

- Directed by: Leslie S. Hiscott
- Written by: Thomas le Breton
- Based on: characters created by John le Breton
- Starring: Sydney Fairbrother; Irene Tripod
- Production company: Quality Plays
- Release date: January 1925 (UK)
- Country: United Kingdom
- Language: Silent

Billets is a 1925 silent-era British comedy film directed by Leslie S. Hiscott and featuring Sydney Fairbrother and Irene Tripod.

== Cast ==
- Sydney Fairbrother as Mrs. May
- Irene Tripod as Mrs. McMull
