= Welcome, Mr. Washington =

- Directed by: Leslie S. Hiscott
- Written by: Jack Whittingham
- Based on: story by Noel Streatfield
- Produced by: Elizabeth Hiscott
- Starring: Barbara Mullen; Donald Stewart; Peggy Cummins; Leslie Bradley
- Cinematography: Gerald Gibbs; Erwin Hillier
- Edited by: Erwin Reiner
- Music by: John Borelli
- Production company: British National Films
- Distributed by: Anglo-American Film Corporation
- Release date: 18 May 1944
- Running time: 91 minutes
- Country: United Kingdom
- Language: English

Welcome, Mr. Washington is a 1944 British drama film directed by Leslie S. Hiscott and starring Barbara Mullen, Donald Stewart and Peggy Cummins. It was written by Jack Whittingham based on a story by Noel Streatfeild. The film was made by British National Films.

Welcome, Mr. Washington was listed as one of the British Film Institute's "75 Most Wanted" lost films for some years. It emerged in early 2016 that a complete print had been discovered in a locker in London's Cinema Museum. It was screened at BFI Southbank in late January. It was shown on the British TV channel Talking Pictures TV on 13 October 2020.

== Premise ==
During the Second World War, two sisters are left almost penniless by their father's sudden death, and so they decide to lease their estate as an airbase to the newly-arrived American forces.

== Cast ==
- Barbara Mullen as Jane Willoughby
- Donald Stewart as Lieutenant Johnny Grant
- Peggy Cummins as Sarah Willoughby
- Leslie Bradley as Captain Abbot
- Roy Emerton as Selby
- Martita Hunt as Miss Finch
- Arthur Sinclair as Murphy
- Graham Moffatt as Albert Brown
- Shelagh Fraser as Millie
- Beatrice Varley as Martha
- George Carney as publican
- Louise Lord as Katherine Willoughby
- Paul Blake as Vernon
- Drusilla Wills as Mrs. Curley
- Gordon Begg as vicar
- Julian D'Albie as Cox
- Hal Gordon as chauffeur
- Danny Green as Hank
- Irene Handl as Mrs. Pidgeon
- Herbert Lomas as blacksmith
- John McLaren as Corporal
- Thomas Palmer as Bud
- Tony Quinn as Sergeant McGinnis
- Johnnie Schofield as butcher
- Elsie Wagstaff as Miss Jones
- Alexander Field as yokel
- Victor Wood as yokel

== Reception ==
The Monthly Film Bulletin wrote: "Barbara Mullen is attractively serious as Jane, Donald Stewart a quite likable Johnny, Peggy Cummins amusingly precocious as Sarah, and members of the American Army make the invasion of the village a realistic one. This is a well-directed, pleasant film, with a strong supporting cast, and provides entertainment about the war from a quieter and more humorous angle than usual."

Kine Weekly wrote: "The story, which, by the way, has exceedingly good dialogue, is responsible for a perfectly plausible, as well as a thoroughly entertaining impression of English village life and 'not-so-innocents' abroad. At the same time, it tenderly illustrates the joys and disillusionments of adolescents and gives our American visitors a well-timed pat on the back. There is, however, considerably more in it than that which meets the eye and not the least significant of its subtleties is its graceful hint that industry and commerce are slowly but surely ousting feudalism and the old aristocracy."
