= Without You (film) =

1934 film

- Feature on the film in Picture Show (7 July 1934)
- Directed by: John Daumery
- Written by: Michael Barringer; Scott Darling
- Produced by: Herbert Smith
- Starring: Henry Kendall; Wendy Barrie; Margot Grahame
- Cinematography: Alex Bryce
- Production company: British Lion
- Distributed by: Fox Film
- Release date: 2 July 1934
- Running time: 65 minutes
- Country: United Kingdom
- Language: English

Without You is a 1934 lost British comedy film directed by John Daumery and starring Henry Kendall, Wendy Barrie and Margot Grahame. It was written by Michael Barringer and Scott Darling and made at Beaconsfield Studios as a quota quickie.

== Preservation status ==
The British Film Institute National Archive holds a collection of stills but no film or video materials.

== Plot ==
In frustration, Molly Bannister leaves her under-achieving husband Tony, a promising songwriter working as a debt collector for a piano company. They meet again when Tony turns up at Molly's apartment to collect her piano in lieu of unpaid debt. She begs him to leave it, as it is needed for rehearsals for a musical play she is writing, sponsored by Baron Gustav von Steinmeyer, who also wants to marry her. The baron appears, and not knowing Tony's identity, asks him to be professional co-respondent in Molly's divorce, threatening to withdraw his backing from the new show otherwise. Molly and Tony go along with his request, only revealing their real relationship when the play has triumphed.

== Cast ==
- Henry Kendall as Tony Bannister
- Wendy Barrie as Molly Bannister
- Margot Grahame as Margot Gilbey
- Fred Duprez as Baron Gustav von Steinmeyer
- George Harris as Harrigan
- Billy Mayerl as Fink
- Joe Hayman as Blodgett

== Reception ==
Kine Weekly wrote: "Ingenuous domestic farce, rather slow at times, but on the whole good entertainment. Production and acting are workmanlike, the settings attractive, and the whole a highly usable supporting feature in the general programme. ... Henry Kendall gives a creditable, if unremarkable, performance as the rather weak-kneed Tony, Wendy Barrie supporting him with a graceful interpretation of the tempestuous wife."

The Daily Film Renter wrote: "Plot never convinces, being presented on leisurely lines, with overplus of trite dialogue and absurd situations. Main interest is vested in smooth portrayals by Kendall and Wendy Barrie, who manage to be entertaining, despite poor story material."

Picture Show wrote: "Acting and direction competent."
