= Flat No. 3 =

- Directed by: Leslie S. Hiscott
- Written by: Michael Barringer
- Produced by: Herbert Smith
- Starring: Mary Glynne; Betty Astell; Cecil Parker
- Cinematography: Alex Bryce
- Production company: British Lion
- Distributed by: Metro-Goldwyn-Mayer
- Release date: January 1934
- Running time: 46 minutes
- Country: United Kingdom
- Language: English

Flat No. 3 is a 1934 British crime film directed by Leslie S. Hiscott starring Mary Glynne, Betty Astell and Cecil Parker. It was written by Michael Barringer. It was made at Beaconsfield Studios as a quota quickie.

A lawyer who assists a widow who has killed her blackmailer.

== Preservation status ==
The British Film Institute National Archive holds a collection of stills but no film or video materials.

== Plot ==
Mrs. Rivington, whose son Harry is engaged to a young woman named Joan, receives a message from an old acquaintance, Kettler, requesting that she visit his flat. On her arrival, Kettler reveals he needs money and attempts to blackmail her using a letter she wrote long ago. When his extortion attempt fails, he turns aggressive. There is a struggle that leaves Kettler seemingly dead from his injuries. Hilary Mayne, Joan's lawyer uncle and the tenant of the flat below, comes to investigate the commotion. Despite having never met Mrs. Rivington before, he advises her to leave. When the subsequently meet again at a dinner party, Hilary offers her legal counsel. Ultimately, the stiuation is resolved when they discover that Kettler is still alive.

== Cast ==
- Mary Glynne as Mrs. Rivington
- D. A. Clarke-Smith as Kettler
- Betty Astell as Trixie
- Lewis Shaw as Harry Rivington
- Cecil Parker as Hilary Maine
- Dorothy Vernon as Mrs. Crummitt

== Reception ==
Kine Weekly wrote: "The fact that the story pursues the obvious path does not seriously detract from its ability to create suspense and entertain, for such is the soundness of the characterisation and the straightforwardness of the direction that heart interest and modest thrills visit the situations. The climax occasions no real surprise but it satisfies in its smooth presentation of the happy ending. For that purpose for which it is devised, that of supporting feature, the film has much to recommend it."

The Daily Film Renter wrote: "The material, it must be admitted, does not seem to offer very much scope, but, nevertheless, it would appear that little imagination had been used in the production. We are continually treated to shots of people climbing two or three flights of stairs to Kettler's flat, while the dialogue throughout is exceptionally weak. Some light interludes are provided by a caretaker, but the humour is so thin that it would only appeal to less critical patrons."
