= I'll Stick to You =

1933 film

- Jay Laurier and Betty Astell in the film
- Directed by: Leslie S. Hiscott
- Written by: Michael Barringer
- Produced by: Herbert Smith
- Starring: Jay Laurier; Betty Astell; Louis Hayward
- Production company: British Lion
- Distributed by: British Lion
- Release date: 1933
- Running time: 66 minutes
- Country: United Kingdom
- Language: English

I'll Stick to You is a 1933 British comedy film directed by Leslie S. Hiscott and starring Jay Laurier, Betty Astell, Louis Hayward and Hal Walters. It was written by Michael Barringer and made at Beaconsfield Studios as a quota quickie.

== Preservation status ==
The British Film Institute National Archive holds a collection of ephemera and stills but no film or video materials.

== Cast ==
- Jay Laurier as Adam Tipper
- Betty Astell as Pauline Mason
- Louis Hayward as Ronnie Matthews
- Ernest Sefton as Mortimer Moody
- Hal Walters as Wilkins
- Annie Esmond as Eve Oglethorpe
- Charles Childerstone as Pilgrim

== Reception ==
Kine Weekly wrote: "Farcical comedy, which successfully rings the changes on popular gags and situations and presents them in a modern guise. The pace is not terrific, but the film nevertheless succeeds in recording a steady succession of laughs, and its humour is put over by a competent and hard-working cast, headed by Jay Laurier."

Picturegoer wrote: "Obvious humour and gags go to make up this farce ... It is all ingenuous fooling, with a touch of sex to give it spice. Jay Laurier, a little old-fashioned in his methods, nevertheless gets the laughs, while Betty Astell makes a vivacious and attractive heroine."

Picture Show wrote: "Hearty comedy ...Amusing situations, neat dialogue, effective night-club settings."
