= Leslie S. Hiscott =

British film director and screenwriter (1894–1968)

- Born: Leslie Stephenson Hiscott; 25 July 1894; Fulham, London, England
- Died: 3 May 1968 (aged 73); Paddington, London, England
- Years active: 1923–1956

Leslie Stephenson Hiscott (25 July 1894 – 3 May 1968) was a British film director and screenwriter who made over sixty films between 1925 and 1956. He was born in London in 1894. He directed Alibi (1931), the first ever depiction of Hercule Poirot, Agatha Christie's Belgian detective, with Austin Trevor in the lead role. He directed a follow-up, Black Coffee (also 1931), also starring Trevor.

During the 1930s, he became best known for his mystery films, also working on portrayals of Conan Doyle's Sherlock Holmes and A. E. W. Mason's Inspector Hanaud. He worked extensively at Twickenham Film Studios in west London where he was a co-founder.

== Filmography ==
=== Director ===
- Raising the Wind (1925)
- A Friend of Cupid (1925)
- A Fowl Proceeding (1925)
- Cats (1925)
- Billets (1925)
- The Marriage Business (1927)
- S.O.S. (1928)
- The Passing of Mr. Quinn (1928)
- Ringing the Changes (1929)
- The Feather (1929)
- Call of the Sea (1930)
- The House of the Arrow (1930)
- At the Villa Rose (1930)
- The Sleeping Cardinal (1931)
- Brown Sugar (1931)
- Alibi (1931)
- Black Coffee (1931)
- A Night in Montmartre (1931)
- When London Sleeps (1932)
- A Tight Corner (1932)
- A Safe Proposition (1932)
- Once Bitten (1932)
- Murder at Covent Garden (1932)
- The Missing Rembrandt (1932)
- The Crooked Lady (1932)
- Double Dealing (1932)
- The Face at the Window (1932)
- That's My Wife (1933)
- Strike It Rich (1933)
- The Stolen Necklace (1933)
- Out of the Past (1933)
- Marooned (1933)
- The Iron Stair (1933)
- I'll Stick to You (1933)
- His Grace Gives Notice (1933)
- Yes, Madam (1933)
- The Melody-Maker (1933)
- Cleaning Up (1933)
- The Stickpin (1933)
- Great Stuff (1933)
- Passing Shadows (1934)
- Keep It Quiet (1934)
- Flat Number Three (1934)
- The Man I Want (1934)
- Gay Love (1934)
- Crazy People (1934)
- She Shall Have Music (1935)
- A Fire Has Been Arranged (1935)
- The Big Splash (1935)
- The Triumph of Sherlock Holmes (1935)
- Annie, Leave the Room! (1935)
- Three Witnesses (1935)
- Inside the Room (1935)
- Death on the Set (1935)
- Department Store (1935)
- The Interrupted Honeymoon (1936)
- Fame (1936)
- Millions (1937)
- Fine Feathers (1937)
- Ship's Concert (1937)
- Tilly of Bloomsbury (1940)
- The Seventh Survivor (1941)
- Sabotage at Sea (1942)
- Lady from Lisbon (1942)
- The Butler's Dilemma (1943)
- Welcome, Mr. Washington (1944)
- The Time of His Life (1955)
- Tons of Trouble (1956)

=== Screenwriter ===
- Squibs M.P. (1923)
- Squibs' Honeymoon (1923)
- The Marriage Business (1927)
- The Passing of Mr. Quin (1928)
- Ringing the Changes (1929)
- To What Red Hell (1929)
- The Feather (1929)
- The Sleeping Cardinal (1931)
- The Time of His Life (1955)
- Tons of Trouble (1956)
