= Department Store (1935 film) =

1935 British film by Leslie S. Hiscott

- Trade show advertisement
- Directed by: Leslie S. Hiscott
- Written by: H. F. Maltby; Harry Fowler Mear
- Produced by: Julius Hagen
- Starring: Garry Marsh; Eve Gray; Sebastian Shaw; Geraldine Fitzgerald
- Cinematography: William Luff
- Music by: W.L. Trytel
- Production company: Twickenham Studios
- Distributed by: Radio Pictures
- Release date: 7 October 1935
- Running time: 65 minutes
- Country: United Kingdom
- Language: English

Department Store (also known as Departmental Store and Bargain Basement) is a 1935 British crime film directed by Leslie S. Hiscott and starring Geraldine Fitzgerald, Eve Gray, Garry Marsh and Sebastian Shaw. It was written by H. F. Maltby and Harry Fowler Mear.

== Plot ==
Bradbury, crooked manager of Johnson's Department Store, is approached by Buxton, solicitor to the absent owner Johnson, to say Johnson plans to hand the reins to his nephew John Goodman Johnson – with the proviso that John must first spend a year working under the pseudonym of "Goodman" and learning the trade. He's also asked by a contact, James Goodman, to find work for his nephew Bob Burge Goodman, under the name Burge: he's just out of jail after doing three years for safecracking. Both men begin work but, knowing they're both Goodmans, Bradbury mistakes them for each other, giving Bob a plush office and secretary, Jane Grey, and John a menial job. Buxton then turns up to place £20,000 in bearer bonds in Johnson's private safe – and announce an audit, which Bradbury knows will reveal his embezzlement. He blackmails the supposed safecracker John into helping him steal the bonds and flee the country (really planning to frame him); Bob also fears discovery and with his burglar mate Sam plans to steal the bonds too. Bob and Sam turn up first but hide when Bradbury and John arrive, followed by Buxton, a policeman, and Jane, a detective hired by Buxton: she uncovered the plot by bugging the staff phones. Bradbury is arrested, John and Jane get together, and Bob and Sam are accidentally left locked in the store's vault, behind bars again.

== Cast ==
- Garry Marsh as Timothy Bradbury
- Eve Gray as Dolly Flint
- Sebastian Shaw as John Goodman Johnson
- Geraldine Fitzgerald as Jane Grey
- Jack Melford as Bob Goodman
- Patric Curwen as James Goodman
- Henry Hallett as Mr. Buxton
- Hal Walters as Sam Sloper

== Production ==
The film was a quota quickie produced at Twickenham Studios by Julius Hagen for distribution by RKO.

== Reception ==
The Monthly Film Bulletin wrote: "The dialogue is exceedingly funny, full of ambiguous statements which can be taken in two ways, and which are! ... Good photography and good entertainment."

Kine Weekly wrote: "As far as possible the obvious is avoided 1n the working out of the simple plot. The principal players approach the artless situations with all seriousness, and it is the sincerity of their, work that compels the majority to register. There is plenty of comedy, a popular touch of romance, and just enough excitement to round off the story satisfactorily."

The Daily Film Renter wrote: "Crude exploitation of dual identity theme. ... Long arm of coincidence is worked to limit, but film lacks elementary rudiments of conviction. Situations frequently evoke unconscious humour, while climax can easily be foreseen early on. Quota supporting feature for indulgent patrons."
