= Davy Burnaby =

British actor (1881–1949)

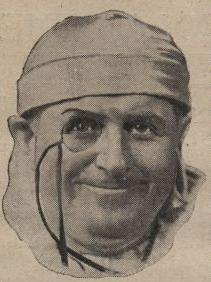
Burnaby circa 1924

George Davy Burnaby (7 April 1881 – 18 April 1949) was a British actor who appeared in more than thirty films between 1929 and 1948. He made his screen debut in the 1929 film The Devil's Maze. He died on 18 April 1949, age 68, the same date as comedian Will Hay with whom he had previously acted.

== Career ==
He was born in Buckland, Hertfordshire, and was the son of the rector, Henry Fowke Burnaby. He attended Haileybury College before reading law at Cambridge University but failed his first exam - so he turned to the Stage. He made his professional debut at a command performance for King Edward VII. He married Vera Turner on November 28th 1908. He formed The Co-Optimists a London concert party which was very successful. Burnaby was renowned on the London Stage and on wireless. His films include Calling All Stars, Song of the Forge, Talking Feet and Leave It to Me.

== Partial filmography ==
- The Devil's Maze (1929)
- Three Men in a Boat (1933)
- A Shot in the Dark (1933)
- That's My Wife (1933)
- Strike It Rich (1933)
- Cleaning Up (1933)
- The Wishbone (1933)
- Keep It Quiet (1934)
- Are You a Mason? (1934)
- The Diplomatic Lover (1934)
- Murder at the Inn (1934)
- The Man I Want (1934)
- On the Air (1934)
- Radio Parade of 1935 (1934)
- Stormy Weather (1935)
- While Parents Sleep (1935)
- Boys Will be Boys (1935)
- Song of the Forge (1937)
- Feather Your Nest (1937)
- The Song of the Road (1937)
- Talking Feet (1937)
- Second Best Bed (1938)
- Woman Hater (1948)
