= Double Dealing (1932 film) =

1932 British film by Leslie S. Hiscott

- Directed by: Leslie S. Hiscott
- Written by: Michael Barringer; H. Fowler Mear
- Produced by: Julius Hagen
- Starring: Richard Cooper; Frank Pettingell; Sydney Fairbrother
- Production company: Real Art Productions
- Distributed by: Fox Film
- Release date: April 1932
- Running time: 47 minutes
- Country: United Kingdom
- Language: English

Double Dealing is a 1932 British comedy film directed by Leslie S. Hiscott and starring Richard Cooper, Frank Pettingell and Sydney Fairbrother. It was written by Michael Barringer and H. Fowler Mear and made as a quota quickie at Twickenham Studios.

== Preservation status ==
The British Film Institute National Archive holds a collection of stills but no film or video materials.

== Plot ==
Young reporter Toby Traill wants to marry actress Dolly Simms, but his uncle, Rufus Moon, the self-righteous chairman of a North Country Watch Committee, refuses to give the couple his consent. When Dolly realizes that Rufus is actually the secret financier behind her own theatrical production, she shares this discovery with Toby, who confronts Rufus with his hypocrisy, leaving the old man with no choice but to bless their marriage.

== Cast ==
- Frank Pettingell as Rufus Moon
- Richard Cooper as Toby Traill
- Sydney Fairbrother as Sarah Moon
- Zoe Palmer as Dolly Simms
- Jill Hands as Betty
- Betty Astell as Flossie
- Aileen Despard as Rosie
- Gladys Hamer as Clara

== Reception ==
Film Weekly wrote: "A farcical protest against 'bumble-dom', too heavy-handedto be really witty, but quite well done on broad lines. The dialogue contains two 'blue' jokes and some 'chestnuts.' The net effect should amuse these whe like music-ball humour on the screen. ... No subtlety is required, either in the acting or the direction, and none is furnished."

Kine Weekly wrote: "A raw but amusing comedy which makes sport of killjoys and other hypocritical humbugs. The humour is certainly topical, and is put over with good effect by Frank Pettingell, who is in first-rate form as the two-faced chairman of a Watch Committee. Some of the lines are a bit near the mark, but they nevertheless score the laughs. ... The central character is played with such good-hearted but scathing truth by Frank Pettingell, who has been well primed with fruity and ambiguous lines, of which nobody can miss the point. The humour, however, never rises above the level of the man in the street, and its broadness and obviousness can be relied upon to score the laughs."

The Daily Film Renter wrote: "Farcical story concerning misadventures of sanctimonious old roueé. Dialogue liberally sprinkled with humorous lines, some of which are a trifle crude. Good direction and lavish settings are highlights of film which is further enhanced by amusing comedy performance of Frank Pettingell.
