= Strike It Rich (1933 film) =

- Opening titles
- Directed by: Leslie S. Hiscott
- Written by: Michael Barringer
- Produced by: Herbert Smith
- Starring: Gina Malo; Davy Burnaby; Betty Astell
- Music by: Reggie Bristow
- Production company: British Lion Films
- Distributed by: British Lion Films
- Release date: November 1933
- Running time: 72 minutes
- Country: United Kingdom
- Language: English

Strike It Rich is a 1933 British comedy film directed by Leslie S. Hiscott and starring Betty Astell, Davy Burnaby, George K. Gee and Wilfrid Lawson. It was written by Michael Barringer, and was made as a quota quickie at Beaconsfield Studios.

== Preservation status ==
The British Film Institute National Archive holds a collection of ephemera and stills but no film or video materials.

== Plot ==
Downtrodden clerk Eddie Smart visits a phrenologist who informs him that he is blessed with Napoleonic leadership qualities. Back at the office, he starts issuing orders and is delighted to find his colleagues take him seriously. What he doesn't know is that he has been chosen as heir to the company, and this news has leaked to his colleagues. When he assumes control of the company, he very quickly reduces it to ruin with a plan involving nutmegs. He flees and is forced to impersonate an Eastern prince, but eventually is able to return and restore the company's fortunes.

== Cast ==
- George K. Gee as Eddie Smart
- Gina Malo as Mary
- Davy Burnaby as Humphrey Wells
- Betty Astell as Janet Wells
- Ernest Sefton as Sankey
- Cyril Raymond as Slaughter
- Wilfrid Lawson as Raikes
- Hal Walters
- Ethel Warwick

== Reception ==
The Daily Film Renter wrote: "Direction capable and technical details quite good. Gee does sterling work and keeps fun fast and furious when he is on the scene. Fun fare for popular patrons."

Picturegoer wrote: "Quite a bright British farce with incidental music and song and dance numbers. The main burden of the entertainment is sustained by George Gee."

Picture Show wrote: "It is an old theme, embellished with some new gags, which do not altogether cover up the threadbare parts."
