= Lewis Shaw =

British actor (1910–1987)

- Born: 1910
- Died: 1987 (aged 76–77)
- Occupation: actor

Lewis Shaw (1910–1987) was a British actor.

== Selected filmography ==
=== Films ===
- Confessions (1925)
- Carry On (1927)
- Zero (1928)
- The Marriage Bond (1932)
- The King's Cup (1932)
- Strange Evidence (1933)
- Early to Bed (1933)
- Open All Night (1934)
- Flat No. 3 (1934)
- The Night Club Queen (1934)
- Are You a Mason? (1934)
- The Rocks of Valpre (1935)
- Once a Thief (1935)
- Death on the Set (1935)

=== Television ===
- Lady Killers (1981) - Lord Alverstone

== Bibliography ==
- Holmstrom, John. The Moving Picture Boy: An International Encyclopaedia from 1895 to 1995, Norwich, Michael Russell, 1996, pp. 43–44.
