= The Amazing Quest of Ernest Bliss =

1936 film by Alfred Zeisler

- A DVD issue of the film, under the US title
- Directed by: Alfred Zeisler
- Written by: John L. Balderston (writer); E. Phillips Oppenheim (novel)
- Produced by: Alfred Zeisler
- Starring: Cary Grant
- Cinematography: Otto Heller
- Edited by: Merrill G. White
- Music by: Werner Bochmann
- Distributed by: United Artists
- Release dates: 28 July 1936 (UK); 27 February 1937 (US)
- Running time: 80 minutes (UK); 62 minutes (US)
- Country: United Kingdom
- Language: English

The Amazing Quest of Ernest Bliss is a 1936 British romantic comedy film directed by Alfred Zeisler and starring Cary Grant. It is a remake of the 1920 film The Amazing Quest of Mr. Ernest Bliss, based on The Curious Quest, a 1919 novel by E. Phillips Oppenheim.

The film was issued in the United States in 1937 under the title The Amazing Adventure (and subsequently Romance and Riches), but edited down to 62 minutes from the reputed original UK running time of 80 minutes. All currently circulating copies are of the US edit, but the British Film Institute has several archive prints of 77 minutes in length. The film is in the public domain and appears on many budget VHS and DVD releases. As a non-US film that was not under copyright in its country of origin on 1 January 1996, it was not eligible for GATT.

== Plot ==
The full film

In London, rich, idle socialite Ernest Bliss feels out of sorts for no discernible reason. He sees a doctor (on the advice of his friend, Lord Honiton), Sir James Aldroyd, who bluntly informs him that he is suffering from too much money, and that he would be cured if he lived for a year on a few pounds per week. Bliss is so insulted that he makes a bet for £50,000 with Sir James that he can survive for a year, supporting himself solely on whatever he earns and not touching his inherited millions.

He takes the Underground to Stepney Green and rents an attic room. He falls behind on the rent, but landlady Mrs. Heath is sympathetic to his plight.

Finally, despite having no experience, he persuades Mr. Masters to give him a job selling Alpha stoves. After three weeks, he has not made a single sale, and Frances Clayton, Masters' secretary, tells Bliss that the company, in which Masters has invested his life savings, is in danger of closing down. Then Bliss comes up with an idea to promote the product. He takes £500 of his own money—but not for his own benefit, so the bet is still on—and offers free meals cooked on the stoves to the general public. A wholesale buyer places a trial order for 100 stoves, with the prospect of purchasing 40,000 a year if things work out. Masters is delighted and offers Bliss a partnership, but Bliss instead resigns.

After he finds another job, Bliss takes Frances to dinner. As they dance, she informs him that she too is leaving Masters; he offered her a partnership too, but of the matrimonial kind.

Late one night, Dr. Alroyd engages a car and a chauffeur for a medical emergency. That chauffeur turns out to be Bliss. After Bliss drives the doctor back to Harley Street, Bliss informs him that almost seven months have elapsed on their bet.

Dorrington, another customer, asks him to come to 11 Regents Park Gate, flat 6, which happens to be Bliss's place. Bliss's valet Clowes, with too much time on his hands, lost heavily betting on the dogs and let the flat to Dorrington. Dorrington had been practising forging Bliss's signature and had noticed the "resemblance" between the chauffeur and the absent owner so wants the chauffeur to cash a cheque for £30,000 in return for a third share. Bliss gets the cashier to give him blank pieces of paper in an envelope and returns to his flat. He reveals who he is to Dorrington and his henchman, but they do not believe him. In the ensuing fight, Dorrington slips away with the worthless envelope while Bliss struggles with the henchman. Finally a drunk Clowes emerges and hits the henchman with a bottle. Afterward, Bliss forgives his servant.

Frances gets a job with Mr. Montague; he makes it clear that he wants more than a secretary, but she needs the work. When she tells Bliss that Montague wants her to do some work outside the office at night, Bliss disables Montague's car and has her hire him to take them to Montague's rendezvous. After confirming that Montague's intentions are not honourable, he takes Frances away. When his boss sacks him, he is unconcerned, but then the manager discharges mechanic Bill Bronson for standing up for him, so Bliss buys the company and orders that the manager be fired and replaced by Bill.

He persuades Frances to accept his marriage proposal. Then her mother arrives with terrible news: Frances's sister will die unless she is taken to a winter resort in Switzerland. In desperation, Frances decides to marry Masters for the money she needs. She moves without informing Bliss. He finally tracks her down and, after learning why she broke up with him, fixes everything and marries her himself.

== Cast ==
- Cary Grant as Ernest Bliss
- Mary Brian as Frances Clayton
- Peter Gawthorne as Sir James Alroyd
- Henry Kendall as Lord Honiton
- Leon M. Lion as Dorrington
- John Turnbull as Masters
- Arthur Hardy as Crawley
- Iris Ashley as Clare
- Garry Marsh as The Buyer
- Andreas Malandrinos as Giuseppi
- Alfred Wellesley as Montague
- Marie Wright as Mrs. Heath
- Buena Bent as Mrs. Mott
- Charles Farrell as Scales
- Quinton McPherson as Clowes (as Quinton MacPherson)
- Hal Gordon as Bill Bronson

== Critical reception ==
Variety thought it "a bit old-fashioned and present-day filmgoers may regard it as implausible. Coincidences are highly improbable, and the whole thing, despite excellent direction and acting, moves at a pace that demands a large measure of cutting before being offered to the general public... Cary Grant looks and acts the part with deft characterization. He secures laughs easily and apparently without effort. Mary Brian plays the role of the typist with a metallic harshness which would be more in keeping with the gold-digger. One expects more feminine softness and sympathy from such a role. Most of the other actors and actresses are adequate, and production details are very good".

In his book British Popular Films 1929-1939: The Cinema of Reassurance, Stephen Shafer notes that the plot was intended to appeal to working-class filmgoers, as it gave over the message that their lives were more fulfilling than those of millionaires. Shafer writes:

Obviously, the thrust of The Amazing Quest of Ernest Bliss implied that the "earnest bliss", suggested by the pun in the title, which the protagonist sought could be obtained by hard work, generosity, and self-sacrifice, all concepts with which working-class individuals in real life might well be familiar. Clearly, Bliss's happiness was to be derived from people rather than money which had created his isolation as a millionaire and left him depressed. ... the subtle theme of the feature was that the ordinary moviegoer ought to be grateful in some respects for the simple pleasures in life which he could enjoy but which the wealthy ordinarily did not experience.
