= Ringing the Changes =

1929 film

- Directed by: Leslie S. Hiscott
- Written by: Raleigh King; Leslie S. Hiscott
- Produced by: Julius Hagen
- Starring: Henry Edwards; Margot Landa; James Fenton; Forrester Harvey
- Production company: Strand Films
- Distributed by: Argosy Films
- Release date: March 1929
- Running time: 6,915 feet
- Country: United Kingdom
- Languages: Silent; English intertitles

Ringing the Changes is a 1929 British silent comedy film directed by Leslie S. Hiscott and starring Henry Edwards, Charles Cantley, James Fenton and Margot Landa. It was based on a novel by Raleigh King. The screenplay concerns an aristocrat who poses as a butler in order to expose a dishonest lawyer.

== Cast ==
- Henry Edwards as Lord Bamerton
- Margot Landa as Jill Farrar
- James Fenton as Stinson
- Forrester Harvey as Steve Blower
- Philip Hewland as Mr Guggleswick
- Barbara Gott as Mrs Guggleswick
- Rex Maurice as Henry Foxley
- Jeff Barlow as Dorcas
- Charles Cantley
