= Murder at Covent Garden =

1932 film

- Feature in Picture Show (7 May 1932)
- Directed by: Leslie S. Hiscott
- Written by: Michael Barringer; William J. Makin
- Produced by: Julius Hagen
- Starring: Dennis Neilson-Terry; Anne Grey; Walter Fitzgerald
- Production company: Twickenham Film Studios
- Distributed by: Woolf & Freedman Film Service
- Release date: 2 May 1932
- Running time: 92 minutes
- Country: United Kingdom
- Language: English

Murder at Covent Garden (also known as Murder in Covent Garden) is a 1932 British crime film directed by Leslie S. Hiscott and starring Dennis Neilson-Terry, Anne Grey, George Curzon and Walter Fitzgerald. It was written by Michael Barringer and William J. Makin, and made at Twickenham Studios. The screenplay involves a detective who investigates the murder of a night club owner.

== Plot ==
A detective goes undercover and poses as a criminal to try to discover the reasons behind the murder of a night club owner.

== Cast ==
- Dennis Neilson-Terry as Jack Trencham
- Anne Grey as Helen Osmond
- Walter Fitzgerald as Donald Walpace
- Henri De Vries as Van Blond
- George Curzon as Belmont

== Reception ==
Film Weekly wrote: "Murder at Covent Garden is a mystery drama which is so mysterious that it is often very difficult to make out exactly what is supposed to be happening; and why ... Dennis Neilson-Terry considerably overdoes the air of gentlemanly sangfroid with which he conducts his investigations, or pursues his nefarious schemes, as the case may be. George Curzon is baffled by the obscurities of lie plot, while Anne Grey, as a girl involved in the mystery, has little to do but look alarmed and bewildered, Her bewilderment will be nothing to that of most audiences. ... Suspense is liable to be replaced by boredom when so little happens in so many reels, and so much of what does happen is deliberately cryptic. Poor entertainment."

Picturegoer wrote: "There are ingenuous thrills and a well-produced fire climax, but the story is slowly developed and generally rather too obvious."
