= Crazy People (1934 film) =

1934 British film by Leslie S. Hiscott

- Directed by: Leslie S. Hiscott
- Written by: Michael Barringer
- Based on: Safety First (novel) by Margot Neville
- Produced by: Herbert Smith
- Starring: Henry Kendall; Nancy O'Neil; Kenneth Kove
- Production company: British Lion
- Distributed by: Metro-Goldwyn-Mayer
- Release date: October 1934
- Running time: 67 minutes
- Country: United Kingdom
- Language: English

Crazy People is a 1934 British comedy film directed by Leslie S. Hiscott and starring Henry Kendall, Nancy O'Neil and Kenneth Kove. It was written by Michael Barringer based on the 1924 novel Safety First by Margot Neville (pseudonym of Margot Goyder and Ann Goyder), and was made at Beaconsfield Studios as a quota quickie.

== Preservation status ==
The British Film Institute National Archive holds no stills or ephemera, and no film or video materials.

== Plot ==
Hippocrates Rayne is a man-about-town who depends for cash on his wealthy aunt Caroline. He loses a valuable ring she has entrusted to him, and then wins a country mansion in a dice game. After hilarious complications, he tells his aunt that the mansion is a private mental asylum, and arranges for his friends to pose as inmates. The ring is eventually recovered.

== Cast ==
- Henry Kendall as Hippo Rayne
- Nancy O'Neil as Nanda Macdonald
- Kenneth Kove as Birdie Nightingale
- Helen Haye as Aunt Caroline
- Vera Bogetti
- Wally Patch
- Hal Walters
- Hugh E. Wright

== Reception ==
Kine Weekly wrote: "An unpretentious picture, which nevertheless finds popular humour in the exploitation of an original idea. The story provides equal opportunities for the principal players, and they get down to their task with an enthusiasm that permits each crazy situation to score its full complement of laughs. The love interest, too, is given clear recognition and provides a pleasing pivot. An entertaining supporting proposition for the majority of theatres."

The Daily Film Renter wrote: "Well photographed, smoothly directed, and packed with bright situations, film offers divertingly inconsequential fun. ... The amount of genuinely amusing fun offered by this film effectively offsets any criticism regarding the improbabilities of the plot.

Picturegoer wrote: "Unpretentious comedy, which finds its humour in its dialogue and characterisations rather than in its action, which is inclined to drag at times."
