= Three Witnesses (film) =

- Opening titles
- Directed by: Leslie S. Hiscott
- Written by: Michael Barringer; S. Fowler Wright (novel)
- Produced by: Julius Hagen
- Starring: Henry Kendall; Eve Gray; Sebastian Shaw
- Production company: Twickenham Studios
- Distributed by: Universal Pictures
- Release date: March 1935
- Running time: 68 minutes
- Country: United Kingdom
- Language: English

Three Witnesses is a 1935 British crime film directed by Leslie S. Hiscott and starring Henry Kendall, Eve Gray and Sebastian Shaw. It was written by Michael Barringer based on the novel by S. Fowler Wright, and made at Twickenham Studios as a quota quickie.

== Premise ==
After one of the partners in a haulage company is murdered, his brother is arrested on suspicion of the crime. A solicitor sets out to prove his innocence.

== Cast ==
- Henry Kendall as Leslie Trent
- Eve Gray as Margaret Truscott
- Sebastian Shaw as Roger Truscott
- Garry Marsh as Charles Rowton
- Gerald Pring as Mark Boddington
- Richard Cooper as Claude Pember
- Geraldine Fitzgerald as Diana Morton
- Noel Dryden as Cyril Truscott
- Ralph Truman as Mr Albert Bellman
- Gladys Hamer as Mrs. Bellman
- Gerald Hamer
- Henry Wolston

== Reception ==
Kine Weekly wrote: "Non-stop talking mystery play, the plot of which thickens and thickens until it becomes a little too thick. The greatest mystery of all, however, is the object of the entertainment's appeal, for the masses demand action and the better-class patrons some measure of intelligence, neither of which are conceded. Very ordinary quota booking."

The Daily Film Renter wrote: "Developed mainly on lines of dialogue, with occasional comedy interpolations from Richard Cooper as law student with mania for shocker novels. Excellent photography. Fair quota support for the masses."

Picture Show wrote: "Henry Kendall as Leslie Trent gives a confident portrayal of the role, while Eve Gray as Margaret looks attractive. The remainder of the cast do not seem to settle down to their respective parts. Fair entertainment."
