= Viola Lyel =

English actress (1896–1972)

Viola Lyel (19 December 1896 – 14 August 1972) was an English actress. In a long stage career she appeared in the West End and on Broadway, for leading directors of the day, including Sir Barry Jackson, and Nigel Playfair. Her roles ranged from Shakespeare and Restoration comedy to melodrama and drawing room comedies.

== Life and career ==
=== Early years ===
Viola Mary Watson was born in Hull, Yorkshire, the daughter of Frederick Watson and his wife Elizabeth (née Lyel). She was educated at Hull High School and Kilburn High School, London. She studied for the stage at the Guildhall School of Music and Drama, and was a student at the Old Vic where she made her first appearance in 1918, playing small parts and understudying.

In 1919 Lyel appeared in William Poel's company in The Return from Parnassus in London. She toured in Ben Greet's company, and in 1922 went to the Liverpool Repertory Company after which she was a member of Sir Barry Jackson's Birmingham Repertory Company from 1925.

=== West End and Broadway ===
In 1926 she appeared in Yellow Sands at the Haymarket Theatre, London in a company that was led by Cedric Hardwicke and included the young Ralph Richardson. Two years later she was a member of Nigel Playfair's company at the Lyric Theatre, Hammersmith. In 1929 she went to America for the first time, and made her first appearance in New York, at the Elting Theatre in September as Lucy Timson in Murder on the Second Floor.

During the 1930s, her roles included Nancy Sibley in Milestones (1930), Clare Pembroke in Nine Till Six (New York, 1930), Edith in Bernard Shaw's Getting Married (1932), Enid Underwood in John Galsworthy's Strife (1933), Prudence in The Lady of the Camellias (1934), Gwen in The Late Christopher Bean (1934 and again in 1935), and Miss Bingley in an adaptation of Pride and Prejudice, which ran for nearly a year (1936). She joined the Old Vic company in 1938, playing Valeria in Coriolanus. In 1939 she appeared in Married for Money by Will Scott.

Among Lyel's roles in the 1940s were Emily Creed in Ladies in Retirement (1941), Miss Preen in The Man Who Came to Dinner, which ran for two years from 1942; she returned to the part in 1944 on a tour for ENSA. At the Shakespeare Memorial Theatre, Stratford-upon-Avon she played the Queen in Hamlet, Helena in A Midsummer Night's Dream, and Lady Politick WouldBe in Volpone in 1944, followed the next year by Mistress Page in The Merry Wives of Windsor, Octavia in Antony and Cleopatra, Mrs Hardcastle in She Stoops to Conquer, Queen Katharine in Henry VIII, the Nurse in Romeo and Juliet, and Emilia in Othello . Beginning in March 1948 she played the gawky schoolmistress Miss Gosssage in The Happiest Days of Your Life, which ran for more than six hundred performances.

=== Later years ===
In the 1950s, she rejoined the Old Vic, where her parts included the Widow of Florence in All's Well That Ends Well and the Queen in King John. Returning to comedy in February 1954 she played Miss Ashford in a revival of The Private Secretary. In 1956 she appeared in the long-running comedy The Bride and the Bachelor by Ronald Millar in the West End. She returned to the role of Mrs Hardcastle in She Stoops to Conquer, at the Bristol Old Vic in 1960 and played the part in Lebanon with the same company. Also at Bristol she played the Abbess in The Comedy of Errors, and the Nurse in Romeo and Juliet.

In September 1962 she played Hilda Rose in the short-lived London production of Big Fish, Little Fish, and was in a much more successful comedy in 1964, playing Lady Cleghorn in William Douglas-Home's The Reluctant Peer. Her last stage role was Aunt March in an adaptation of Little Women in 1968.

== Marriage and death ==
Lyel married John Anthony Edwards in 1932. She died in 1972 in Hampstead, London, aged 75.

== Selected filmography ==
- S.O.S. (1928)
- Hobson's Choice (1931)
- After Office Hours (1932)
- Let Me Explain, Dear (1932)
- Marry Me (1932)
- Marooned (1933)
- Channel Crossing (1933)
- Over the Garden Wall (1934)
- A Political Party (1934)
- Passing Shadows (1934)
- The Farmer's Wife (1941)
- This Man Is Dangerous (1941)
- The Shop at Sly Corner (1946)
- Mr. Perrin and Mr. Traill (1948)
- It's Not Cricket (1949)
- Black 13 (1953)
- See How They Run (1955)
- Suspended Alibi (1957)
- The Little Hut (1957)

== Selected stage appearances ==
- Murder on the Second Floor by Frank Vosper (1929)
- The Blue Goose by Peter Blackmore (1941)
- The Shop at Sly Corner by Edward Percy Smith (1945)
- The Happiest Days of Your Life by John Dighton (1948)
- Count Your Blessings by Ronald Jeans (1951)
- The Manor of Northstead by William Douglas Home (1954)
- The Bride and the Bachelor by Ronald Millar (1956)
- Wolf's Clothing by Kenneth Horne (1959)
