= Raising the Wind (1925 film) =

1925 film

Raising the Wind is a 1925 British silent-era short comedy film directed by Leslie S. Hiscott and featuring Sydney Fairbrother and Irene Tripod.
