= Yes, Madam (1933 film) =

- Frank Pettingell and Kay Hammond in the film.
- Directed by: Leslie S. Hiscott
- Written by: Michael Barringer; K.R.G. Browne (novel)
- Produced by: Herbert Smith
- Starring: Frank Pettingell; Kay Hammond; Harold French
- Production company: British Lion
- Distributed by: Fox Film
- Release date: February 1933
- Running time: 46 minutes
- Country: United Kingdom
- Language: English

Yes, Madam is a 1933 British comedy film directed by Leslie S. Hiscott and starring Frank Pettingell, Kay Hammond and Harold French. It was written by Michael Barringer based on the novel by K.R.G. Browne (which was again adapted for the 1938 film Yes, Madam?) and was a quota quickie made at Beaconsfield Studios.

== Preservation status ==
The British Film Institute National Archive holds a collection of ephemera but no film or video materials.

== Plot ==
Bill Quinton inherits a fortune from his eccentric uncle, with the proviso that he must work in domestic service for two months. If he fails, the money will go to his cousin, Hugh Tolliver. Taking a job as chauffeur-valet to manufacturer Mr. Peabody, Bill faces sabotage from Hugh, who schemes to get him fired. Complications arise when Peabody desperately tries to retrieve compromising letters written to an actress named Pansy Beresford, and enlists Bill's help. Coincidentally, Hugh is also pursuing Pansy. As Bill protects Peabody from scandal, he manages to outwit his cousin, win Pansy's heart, and secure his inheritance.

== Cast ==
- Harold French as Bill Quinton
- Frank Pettingell as Albert Peabody
- Kay Hammond as Pansy Beresford
- Muriel Aked as Mrs. Peabody
- Peter Haddon as Hugh Tolliver
- Wyn Weaver as Mr. Mountain
- Hal Walters as Catlett

== Reception ==
Film Weekly wrote: "A slick and quite amusing little farce, of the typically 'British' 'brand, which means nothing but gets a satisfactory number of laughs. A good secondary feature."

Kine Weekly wrote: "An artless British comedy, but one devised on boisterous, well-tried lines which invariably produce the laughs from the masses. The complexities of the plot are handled with good effect by a sound cast, and the film does not fall short on the score of technical efficiency. Good supporting feature for the masses."
