= A Piece of Cake (film) =

1948 British film by John Irwin

- Opening titles
- Directed by: John Irwin
- Produced by: John Croydon
- Starring: Cyril Fletcher; Betty Astell; Laurence Naismith; Jon Pertwee
- Cinematography: Walter J. Harvey
- Music by: Arthur Wilkinson
- Production company: Highbury Productions
- Distributed by: General Film Distributors
- Release date: November 1948 (UK)
- Running time: 55 min
- Country: United Kingdom
- Language: English

A Piece of Cake is a 1948 British second feature ('B') fantasy comedy film directed by John Irwin and starring Cyril Fletcher, Betty Astell, Laurence Naismith and Jon Pertwee. It was written by Bernard McNabb and Lyn Lockwood from an original story by Betty Astell and John Croydon.

== Plot ==
In the austere post–World War II British world of rationing, Cyril Clarke composes comical odes for an act for the BBC. As his wife Betty continuously interrupts him to remind him that he needs to obtain supplies from his "under-the counter" contacts for the dinner party they are hosting that evening, he creates an ode to an imaginary character named Merlin Mound who can provide anything one can wish. When he later falls asleep at his desk, he dreams that Merlin has become real and grants his host's wishes for those rationed items of drink and fine food, not by conjuring the items out of thin air, but obtaining them from other people's ownership, which leads to trouble.

== Cast ==
- Cyril Fletcher as Cyril Clarke
- Betty Astell as Betty Clarke
- Laurence Naismith as Merlin Mound
- Jon Pertwee as Mr Short
- Sam Costa as Les Millins
- Miki Hood as Mrs Short
- Tamara Lees as dinner guest
- Audrey White as dinner guest
- Philip Saville as dinner guest
- Ethel Coleridge as Mrs Fiddle
- Johnnie Schofield as window cleaner
- Richard Gilbert as head waiter
- Harry Fowler as spiv
- Arthur Laurence as police inspector
- Sam Kydd as soldier

== Production ==
It was made at Highbury Studios for release by the Rank Organisation.

== Reception ==
The Monthly Film Bulletin wrote: "This slight story soon becomes involved, and is funny in very few parts. The film is slow-moving and the actors could have possibly made more progress with better material. The photography is good and so is a castle sequence; but the film, in short, is not entertaining, and the inclusion of a sadly modernised version of "Cherry Ripe" does not help."

Kine Weekly wrote: "The trick of making out a comedy to be a dream has often proved an effective method of getting away with stale and silly jokes, but the stuff palmed off here is completely beyond redemption. One of Highbury Studio's worst nightmares."

The Daily Film Renter wrote: "Laurence Naismith, Sam Costa, Miki Hood, Jon Pertwee and others in the cast work desperately hard to make the episodes seem funny, but only with limited success."
