= The Man I Want =

- Davy Burnaby and Wendy Barrie in the film
- Directed by: Leslie S. Hiscott
- Written by: Michael Barringer
- Produced by: Herbert Smith
- Starring: Henry Kendall; Wendy Barrie; Betty Astell
- Production company: British Lion
- Distributed by: Metro-Goldwyn-Mayer
- Release date: March 1934
- Country: United Kingdom
- Language: English

The Man I Want (also known as Digging Deep) is a 1934 British comedy film directed by Leslie S. Hiscott and starring Henry Kendall, Wendy Barrie and Betty Astell. It was written by Michael Barringer. The film was a quota quickie made at Beaconsfield Studios.

== Preservation status ==
The British Film Institute National Archive holds a collection of ephemera and stills but no film or video materials.

== Plot ==
Hard-up young gentleman Peter Mason is in love with Marion Round, but her father, Sir George, stands as an obstacle to their union. Prue Darrell, a girl with whom Peter was previously indiscreet, attempts to blackmail him. Coincidentally, Prue’s criminal associates are hunting for a stash of jewellery they stole from Sir George and hastily buried on his estate before serving a prison sentence. When Peter foils their retrieval attempt and returns the stolen gems, Sir George grants him permission to marry Marion.

== Cast ==
- Henry Kendall as Peter Mason
- Wendy Barrie as Marion Round
- Betty Astell as Prue Darrell
- Davy Burnaby as Sir George Round
- Wally Patch as crook
- Hal Walters as crook

== Reception ==
Kine Weekly wrote: "Plenty of action and incident are crowded into the preposterous but lively story, and humour and romance run merrily in double harness. The complications are productive of good situations, all of which are approached in the right spirit by the strong team of experienced and attractive players."

The Daily Film Renter wrote: "Smooth direction results in diverting film, in which suspense and comedy are well to fore. Excellent settings and technical details, quota of romance, and usual misunderstandings. Splendid performances by Henry Kendall, Wendy Barrie and Wally Patch."
