= The Big Splash (film) =

- Frame from the film
- Directed by: Leslie S. Hiscott
- Written by: Michael Barringer
- Produced by: Herbert Smith
- Starring: Frank Pettingell; Finlay Currie; Marguerite Allan
- Production company: British Lion
- Distributed by: British Lion
- Release date: 1935
- Country: United Kingdom
- Language: English

The Big Splash is a 1935 British comedy film directed by Leslie S. Hiscott and starring Frank Pettingell, Finlay Currie and Marguerite Allan. It was written by Michael Barringer, and made as a quota quickie at Beaconsfield Studios. A millionaire hires a man to play his double.

== Preservation status ==
The British Film Institute National Archive holds no stills or ephemera, and no film or video materials.

== Plot ==
Hartley Bassett, an Englishman who made his fortune in America, returns to his birthplace to gift the town a lavish leisure park. However, on his way to the grand opening, he succumbs to a nervous breakdown, and goes into a nursing home. Seeking someone reliable to look after his country estate, he recruits Bodkin, an unemployed man from Wigan he met on the voyage from America. Bodkin embraces the opportunity, finally being able to live his dream of being a millionaire. His impersonatio of Bassett leads to a series of chaotic complications, only resolved when his Mrs Bodkin arrives.

== Cast ==
- Frank Pettingell as Bodkin
- Finlay Currie as Hartley Bassett
- Marguerite Allan as Germaine
- Drusilla Wills as Mrs Bodkin
- Roy Royston as Jack Trent
- Ben Welden as crook
- Percy Parsons as crook

== Reception ==
The Daily Film Renter wrote: "Most of the fun is forthcoming from the antics of Frank Pettingell, who plays Bodkin on his familiar lines. Marguerite Allan has the role of a French golddigger who comes into the plot, and Finlay Currie is well cast as Bassett. Hugh E. Wright deserves praise for his brief study of a shady solicitor. ... Not to be taken seriously, of course, this effort should amuse the masses, especially when the star is the centre of the action."
