= Annie, Leave the Room! =

1935 British film by Leslie S. Hiscott

- Trade advertisement
- Directed by: Leslie S. Hiscott
- Written by: Michael Barringer
- Produced by: Julius Hagen
- Starring: Morton Selten; Eva Moore; Jane Carr
- Cinematography: William Luff
- Production company: Julius Hagen Productions
- Distributed by: Universal Pictures
- Release date: February 1935
- Running time: 76 minutes
- Country: United Kingdom
- Language: English

Annie, Leave the Room! is a 1935 British comedy film directed by Leslie S. Hiscott and starring Morton Selten, Eva Moore and Jane Carr. It was written by Michael Barringer, and made at Twickenham Studios as a quota quickie for release by Universal Pictures.

== Plot ==
Seeking to escape his mother-in-law's grip on his finances, Lord Spendlove happily accepts when a film company offers him £1,000 to lend them his mansion. He does a screen test of himself and his servant Annie, and when a film producer sees it, he signs Annie as a comedienne. Spendlove fails to escape his mother-in-law when it emerges that she is a director of the film company.

== Cast ==
- Morton Selten as Lord Spendlove
- Eva Moore as Mrs. Morley
- Jane Carr as Adrienne Ditmar
- Davina Craig as Annie
- Richard Cooper as the Honourable Algernon Lacey
- Jane Welsh as Lady Mary
- Ben Welden as Raisins
- Arthur Finn as Al Gates
- Edward Underdown as John Brandon
- Alfred Wellesley

== Reception ==
Kine Weekly wrote: "The whole story is staged in rather a haphazard and theatrical manner, but there are really good farcical touches cropping up every now and again which score the laughs."

The Daily Film Renter wrote: "Morton Selten can only be described as a 'riot' in the part of Lord Spendlove, a role he assumes with great skill, managing to steal the picture with ease. Davina Craig, as Annie, repeats her now well-known skivvy study, and the cast also includes Eva Moore, as the iron-willed mother-in-law (whose clutches his lordship so vainly tries to escape); Jane Carr, as a showy American film star; and Richard Cooper (very good), in a rather ineffectual dude part."

Picturegoer wrote: "In spite of the artificial nature of the staging and the somewhat crude nature of the production as a whole, there are several amusing farcical touches and situations in this story of a noble lord who is instrumental in making a star of a servant. Morten Selten is amusing as Lord Spendlove and Davina Craig is extremely funny as the 'dumb' servant."
