= The Marriage Business =

1927 film

- Directed by: Leslie S. Hiscott
- Written by: Leslie S. Hiscott
- Produced by: Leslie S. Hiscott; F.A. Enders
- Starring: Estelle Brody; Owen Nares; Jack Rutherford; Marjorie Hume
- Production company: Enders-Hiscott
- Distributed by: FBO
- Release date: December 1927
- Running time: 6,206 feet
- Country: United Kingdom
- Language: English

The Marriage Business is a 1927 British silent comedy film directed by Leslie S. Hiscott and starring Estelle Brody, Owen Nares and Jack Rutherford. It is also known by the alternative title This Woman Business.

== Cast ==
- Estelle Brody as Annette
- Owen Nares as Robert
- Marjorie Hume as Pat
- Jack Rutherford as Duncan
- Jeff Barlow as Perkins
- Polly Ward as Maid

== Bibliography ==
- Low, Rachael. History of the British Film, 1918-1929. George Allen & Unwin, 1971.
