= Marooned (1933 film) =

- Trade advertisement from The Daily Film Renter (16 November 1933)
- Directed by: Leslie S. Hiscott
- Written by: Michael Barringer
- Produced by: Herbert Smith
- Starring: Edmund Gwenn; Viola Lyel
- Production company: British Lion
- Distributed by: Fox Film
- Release date: November 1933
- Running time: 67 minutes
- Country: United Kingdom
- Language: English

Marooned is a 1933 British drama film directed by Leslie S. Hiscott and starring Edmund Gwenn and Viola Lyel. It was written by Michael Barringer. It was made at Beaconsfield Studios as a quota quickie.

== Preservation status ==
The British Film Institute National Archive holds a collection of ephemera and stills but no film or video materials.

== Plot ==
Lighthouse keeper Tom Roberts and his wife shelter an escaped convict who claims to be the father of Mary, their adopted daughter. Roberts smuggles the fugitive into the lighthouse he manages, but local policeman Wilson is suspicious. He and the others are confined to the lighthouse for a week by a storm, and the secret of the fugitive is revealed.

== Cast ==
- Edmund Gwenn as Tom Roberts
- Viola Lyel as Sarah Roberts
- Iris March as Mary Roberts
- Victor Garland as Norman Bristowe
- Hal Walters as Joe
- Wally Patch as Wilson
- Philip Hewland as Jacob
- Wilfred Shine as Maille

== Reception ==
The Daily Film Renter wrote: "It is obvious here is material tor an entertaining hour, and the picture is effectively enough constructed to put over its somewhat improbable story to the best advantage. The atmosphere of the lighthouse is well contrived, and some excellent genuine storm shots add to the realism of the setting."

Kine Weekly wrote: "Upretentious but nevertheless thoroughly entertaining melodrama – played for the most part in a lighthouse – which has a strong story with an unusual twist, and a capital cast."
