= This Is the Life (1933 film) =

1933 film

- Directed by: Albert de Courville
- Written by: Clifford Grey; Bert Lee; R. P. Weston
- Produced by: Herbert Smith
- Starring: Gordon Harker; Binnie Hale; Betty Astell
- Cinematography: Alex Bryce
- Production company: British Lion
- Distributed by: British Lion
- Release date: September 1933
- Running time: 78 minutes
- Country: United Kingdom
- Language: English

This Is the Life (also known as The Singing Kettle) is a 1933 British comedy film directed by Albert de Courville and starring Gordon Harker, Binnie Hale and Betty Astell. It was written by Clifford Grey, Bert Lee and R. P. Weston, and was made at Beaconsfield Studios by British Lion.

== Plot ==
Sarah Tuttle, owner of a struggling tea room, discovers that she has inherited a huge fortune from her late uncle in Australia. She promptly closes her business and, along with her idle husband Albert, sets out to climb the social ladder. Their whirlwind of luxury comes to a halt when it is revealed that their inheritance is fraudulent. Their wealth confiscated by the authorities, they are forced to return to their old teashop. Luckily, the business had been bought and fully renovated by Bob Travers, who is engaged to their niece, Edna, allowing them a fresh start.

== Cast ==
- Gordon Harker as Albert Tuttle
- Binnie Hale as Sarah Tuttle
- Betty Astell as Edna Wynne
- Ray Milland as Bob Travers
- Jack Barty as Bert Scroggins
- Charles Heslop as Mr. Diggs
- Percy Parsons as Lefty Finn
- Ben Welden as Two Gun Mullins
- Norma Whalley as Miss Vavasour
- Julian Royce as Bronson
- Percival Mackey and his Orchestra as themselves

== Reception ==
The Daily Film Renter wrote: "Screamingly funny farce on well-tried lines, exploiting gaucheries of humble couple elevated to ranks of society. Perfect vehicle for Gordon Harker and Binnie Hale, who, in first talkie, proves she has come to stay. Laughter-raising situations culminating in riotous 'cod' operatic duet, which will raise the roof."

Kine Weekly wrote: "The familiar device of planting Cockneys into Society and making sport of their reaction has been shrewdly explotied by the director, Albert de Courville, and the result is rich, wholesome comedy. The theme prowdes a perfect vehicle for the inimitable humour of Gordon Harker and Binnie Hale, and their side-splitting partnership is a real tonic."

Picturegoer wrote: "Brightly entertaining picture, scrappily developed, but proving that in Gordon Harker and Binnie Hale we have a first-class comedy team. ... Taken individually, some of the scenes are very funny, and give full scope to both the Harker and Hale brand of comedy."
