= Double or Quits (1938 film) =

1938 British film by Roy William Neill

- Frank Fox, Patricia Medina and Gordon McLeod in a scene from the film
- Directed by: Roy William Neill
- Written by: Michael Barringer
- Produced by: Irving Asher
- Starring: Frank Fox; Patricia Medina; Hal Walters
- Cinematography: Basil Emmott
- Production company: Warner Brothers
- Distributed by: Warner Brothers
- Release date: March 1938
- Running time: 72 minutes
- Country: United Kingdom
- Language: English

Double or Quits is a 1938 lost British crime film directed by Roy William Neill and starring Frank Fox, Patricia Medina and Hal Walters. It was written by Michael Barringer and shot at Teddington Studios, and was made as a quota quickie by the British subsidiary of Warner Brothers.

== Preservation status ==
The British Film Institute has classed Double or Quits as a lost film. Its National Archive holds no ephemera, stills, film or video materials.

== Synopsis ==
A reporter on a transatlantic cruise ship is accused of theft. In attempting to clear his name he discovers a more serious conspiracy.

== Cast ==
- Frank Fox as Bill Brooks / Scotty Tucker
- Patricia Medina as Caroline
- Hal Walters as Alf
- Ian Fleming as Sir Frederick Beal
- Gordon McLeod as School
- Jack Raine as Roland
- Philip Ray as Hepworth
- Charles Paton as Mr. Binks
- Mae Bacon as Mrs. Binks

== Reception ==
The Monthly Film Bulletin wrote: "The film starts in too leisurely a fashion, and then hurries into its conclusion, giving the impression of being longer than it is. The minor parts are well acted – School, Beal and the comic steward Alf. Caroline might have been made more attractive and less snubbing. Frank Fox works hard all through as Bill."

Kine Weekly wrote: "Frank Fox works hard in the dual roles of Bill and Scotty Tucker. Patricia Medina is a pretty Caroline and Gordon McLeod, Ian Fleming and Jack Raine are competent in straight supporting roles. Comedy relief is in the safe hands of Hal Walters. There are times when the plot is a trifle involved, but in spite of its many strings, fundamentals are clearly established. Momentum is keen, surprise is frequent and the character drawing convincing. A British gangster melodrama, it is a first-rate copy of the real thing."

The Daily Film Renter wrote: "Suspenseful narrative told with plenty of action, with Cockney humour providing lighter relief. Good popular fare. ...The plot contains strong suspense values born of the projected theft and also sundry plans for double-crossing. There is a slight romantic interest between the reporter and the girl, whose uncle is implicated in the scheme. Frank Fox has the dual role of the reporter and gangster, and plays the respective parts with virility. Patricia Medina is pleasant as the girl, while Hal Walters is entertaining as the cockney steward."

Picturegoer wrote: "Frank Fox is fair as the hero. Patricia Medina is pretty as the heroine. Competent support is given by Gordon McLeod, Ian Fleming, Jack Raine. Hal Walters supplies the comedy relief."

Picture Show wrote: "Frank Fox does well in the dual role and is given competent support. While the film is not altogether clear, it is well directed."
