= Henry Kendall (actor) =

English stage and film actor (1897–1962)

- In The Hotel Mouse, 1921
- Born: 28 May 1897; London, England
- Died: 9 June 1962 (aged 65); Le Rayol, France
- Occupations: Actor, director, revue artiste

Henry Kendall AFC, (28 May 1897 – 9 June 1962) was an English stage and film actor, theatre director and revue artiste.

His early theatrical career was curtailed by the First World War, in which he served with distinction. Resuming his stage career in 1919 he appeared mostly in the West End, with one excursion to Broadway and occasional tours of the British provinces, particularly during the Second World War. He was dismissive of his career as a screen actor, but made more than 40 films for the cinema. As a theatre director he was responsible for more than 20 productions, in a minority of which he also starred.

In his later years he had heart problems, which forced his temporary withdrawal from the theatre in 1957. He died of a heart attack in the south of France in 1962, at the age of 65. He was unmarried.

== Early life ==
Kendall was born in London in 1897, the son of William Kendall and his wife Rebecca, née Nathan. He was educated at the City of London School. He began his stage career "walking on" (as a non-speaking extra) in Tommy Atkins at the Lyceum Theatre in 1914. From then until he joined the armed forces during the First World War he was first a chorus member in Business as Usual at the Hippodrome Theatre (1914), then a supporting player in Watch Your Step (Empire Theatre, 1915); and for nine months a member of the Old Vic company, playing juvenile parts in Shakespeare repertory, including Claudio in Much Ado About Nothing, Florizel in The Winter's Tale, and Sebastian in Twelfth Night (1915–1916).

From 1916–1919 Kendall served as a captain in the Royal Flying Corps (latterly the Royal Air Force), winning the Air Force Cross.

== Stage career from 1919 ==
=== 1919 to 1930 ===
In the post-war decade Kendall played more than 30 roles in the West End and on Broadway:

Faith Celli and Kendall in Threads, 1921

Play	Role	Theatre	Year
Cyrano de Bergerac	Second Marquis	Garrick	1919
Cyrano de Bergerac	Christian	Drury Lane	1919
Mumsie	Guy	Little	1920
French Leave	Lt George Graham	Globe	1920
Where the Rainbow Ends	Saint George	Apollo	1920
Polly With a Past	Harry Richardson	St James's	1921
The Circle	Edward Luton (Note: succeeding Leon Quartermaine.)	Haymarket	1921
Threads	James	St James's	1921
The Hotel Mouse	Barry Scarlett	Queen's	1921
Two Jacks and a Jill	Tom Godling	Royalty	1921
The Curate's Egg	Various roles	Ambassadors	1922
Arms and the Man	Bluntschli	Everyman	1922
East of Suez	Harold Knox	His Majesty's	1922
Marriage by Instalments	John Wiltshire	Ambassadors	1923
Stop Flirting	Geoffrey Dangerfield	Shaftesbury	1923
Havoc	Dick Chappell	Regent	1923
Havoc	Dick Chappell	Haymarket	1924
Bachelor Husbands	Billy Reynolds	Royalty	1924
As You Like It	Orlando	Regent	1924
Charlot's Revue	Various	Prince of Wales	1924
Tunnel Trench	Lt St Aubyn	Prince's	1925
The Czarina	Count Alexei Czerny	Q	1925
On 'Change	Dr Tom Pearson	Savoy	1925
Naughty Cinderella	Gerald Gray	Lyceum, New York	1925
This Woman Business	Honey	Ritz, New York	1926
The Silent House	Capt Philip Barty	Comedy	1927
The Road to Rome	Mago	Strand	1928
A Damsel in Distress	Reggie Higgins	New	1928
Wrongs and Rights	Hugh Rawson	Strand	1928
Baa, Baa, Black Sheep	Hugo Bonsor	New	1929
The Flying Fool	Vincent Floyd	Prince's	1929
He's Mine	Maxime de Bellencontre	Lyric	1929
The Ghost Train	Teddy Deakin	Comedy	1929

=== 1930 to 1945 ===
In the 1930s and during the Second World War Kendall continued to appear mainly in the West End, but toured in three productions:

Play	Role	Theatre	Year
Odd Numbers	John Strange	Comedy	1930
Charlot's Masquerade	revue – various	Cambridge	1930
A Murder Has Been Arranged	Maurice Mullins	Strand and St James's	1930
Cut for Partners	Hugo	tour	1934
Someone at the Door	Ronnie Martin	Aldwych and New	1935
The World Waits	Kenneth Brice	Aldwych	1935
Bats in the Belfry	Edward Morton	Ambassadors	1937
This Money Business	Gerald Esmond	Ambassadors	1938
Room for Two	Hubert Crone	Comedy	1938
Punch Without Judy	Micky Saunders	Q	1939
House Party	Michael Drumley	Q	1940
Nap Hand	Johnny Potter	tour	1940
High Temperature	Tony Hamilton	Q and Duke of York's	1940
High Temperature	Tony Hamilton	tour	1941
Rise Above It	revue – various	Comedy	1941
Scoop	revue – various	Vaudeville Theatre	1942
A Little Bit of Fluff	John Ayers	Ambassadors	1943
The Fur Coat	Dominic Mallory	Comedy	1943
Sweet and Low	revue – various (Note: succeeded Walter Crisham)	Ambassadors	1944
Sweeter and Lower	revue – various	Ambassadors	1944

=== 1945 to 1961 ===
Play	Role	Theatre	Year
Sweetest and Lowest	revue	Ambassadors	1946
À la Carte	revue	Savoy Theatre	1948
On Monday Next...	Harry Blacker (Note: also directed, in association with Shaun Sutton)	Embassy and Comedy	1949;
For Love or Money	Lovewell	Ambassadors	1950
The Dish Ran Away	Peter Perry	Vaudeville	1950
Caprice	revue – various	touring	1950
The Happy Family	Henry Lord	Duchess	1951
Angels in Love	Pomeroy-Jones	Savoy	1954
Portrait of a Woman	Montague Cloud (Note: also directed)	Q	1954
Beat the Panel (Note: later retitled The Lion in the Lighthouse.)	Oliver Charrington	Royal, Nottingham, and Embassy, London	1955
The Call of the Dodo	Julian Lassiter	Royal, Nottingham	1955
Where the Rainbow Ends	Joseph Flint	New Victoria	1958
Let Them Eat Cake	Lord Whitehall	Cambridge Theatre	1959
Aunt Edwina	title role	Fortune Theatre	1959
Pools Paradise	Bishop of Lax	Phoenix and on tour	1961

== Film career ==
Kendall dismissed his own films, several of which were quota quickies, with the remark that he "commenced film career 1931, and has appeared in innumerable pictures". He played the leading role of Reggie Ogden in the film The Shadow in 1933, and also starred in Alfred Hitchcock's "bravest failure", Rich and Strange, originally released in the United States as East of Shanghai, (1931). Kendall's films included:

- Mr. Pim Passes By (1921)
- Tilly of Bloomsbury (1921)
- French Leave (1930)
- The Flying Fool (1931)
- Rich and Strange (1931)
- Mr. Bill the Conqueror (1932)
- The Innocents of Chicago (1932)
- The Iron Stair (1933)
- The Man Outside (1933)
- The Ghost Camera (1933)
- The Stickpin (1933)
- Great Stuff (1933)
- The Shadow (1933)
- Counsel's Opinion (1933)
- King of the Ritz (1933)
- Timbuctoo (1933)
- This Week of Grace (1933)
- The Flaw (1933)
- The Girl in Possession (1934)
- Leave It to Blanche (1934)
- The Man I Want (1934)
- Crazy People (1934)
- Death at Broadcasting House (1934)
- Without You (1934)
- Death on the Set (1935)
- Lend Me Your Wife (1935)
- Three Witnesses (1935)
- The Amazing Quest of Ernest Bliss (1936)
- A Wife or Two (1936)
- Twelve Good Men (1936)
- School for Husbands (1937)
- Take a Chance (1937)
- Side Street Angel (1937)
- The Compulsory Wife (1937)
- Ship's Concert (1937)
- It's Not Cricket (1937)
- The Mysterious Mr. Davis (1939)
- The Butler's Dilemma (1943)
- 29 Acacia Avenue (1945)
- Dumb Dora Discovers Tobacco (1946)
- Helter Skelter (1949)
- The Voice of Merrill (1952)
- An Alligator Named Daisy (1955)
- The Shadow of the Cat (1961)
- Nothing Barred (1961)

== Revue ==
As a West End revue artiste Kendall appeared in Charlot's Revue at the Prince of Wales Theatre in 1924 and Charlot's Masquerade at the Cambridge Theatre in 1930. He co-starred with Hermione Gingold in the three long-running Sweet and Low revues, with scripts by Alan Melville, first taking over from Walter Crisham in 1944; this was followed in June 1948 by the À la Carte revue at the Savoy Theatre.

He appeared with Hermione Baddeley and Hermione Gingold ("The Two Hermiones"), Walter Crisham and Wilfred Hyde-White, in Leslie Julian Jones's revue Rise Above It, first at the Q Theatre in January 1941, when Hedley Briggs was nominally directing; then in two West End editions of the show which ran for a total of 380 performances at the Comedy Theatre opening in June 1941 and again in December 1941, when he was both starring in and directing the show.

He observed in his autobiography:

Of all forms of theatrical entertainment, revue is the most bitchy. The material is bitchy, the artists are bitchy and, strangely enough, the average revue audience is bitchy. And here I was starring with two acknowledged 'Queens of Revue' [Baddeley and Gingold], faced also with the task of director... call[ing] for every possible ounce of tact and diplomacy. Then came the vexed question of "billing" – who should take precedence, Baddeley or Gingold (or should I say Gingold or Baddeley)? It was the responsibility of the management to make the decision. ... [the] solution was quite simple: we had two sets of bills and placards, used on alternate weeks throughout the run, which satisfied both the ladies.

== Director ==
In addition to a busy career as an actor and entertainer Kendal was frequently engaged as a director, staging, among other plays, the first productions of See How They Run (Peterborough Rep, tour and Q Theatre 1944; Comedy Theatre 1945), and The Shop at Sly Corner (St Martin's Theatre 1945). He also directed numerous plays at the Embassy Theatre and Q Theatre.

In Chapter 23 of his autobiography, 'I Remember Romano's', 'An Alligator and Mr. Chaplin', (Macdonald, London, 1960), Kendal wrote that Peter Daubeny asked him in 1955 to " ...keep an eye on, (produce), his revival at the Palace", (Palace Theatre, London), of The Merry Widow, starring Jan Kiepura and Marta Eggerth, while he was on business in Paris.

Among his productions were:

- A Lass and a Lackey, Q Theatre, December 1940
- Rise Above It (revue), Comedy Theatre, June 1941
- Other People's Houses, Ambassadors Theatre, October 1941
- Scoop (revue), Vaudeville Theatre, April 1942
- Man from Heaven, Q Theatre, September 1943
- This Was a Woman, Comedy Theatre, March 1944 – previously staged at the Q Theatre as The Dark Potential, January 1944
- Fly Away Peter, Q Theatre, September 1944
- See How They Run, Q Theatre, December 1944; Comedy Theatre, January 1945
- Great Day, Playhouse Theatre, March 1945
- The Shop at Sly Corner, St Martin's Theatre, April 1945
- Green Laughter, Q Theatre, August 1945; Comedy Theatre, June 1946
- Fit for Heroes, Embassy Theatre, September 1945; Whitehall, December 1945
- Macadam and Eve, Aldwych Theatre, March 1951
- The Nest Egg, Wimbledon Theatre, November 1952
- Where the Rainbow Ends, Stoll Theatre, December 1953
- Meet a Body, Duke of York's Theatre, July 1954
- Tropical Fever, Theatre Royal, Brighton, March 1955
- Ring for Catty, Lyric Theatre, February 1956
- You, Too, Can Have a Body, Victoria Palace, June 1958
- Watch It, Sailor! (in association with André Van Gyseghem, Aldwych Theatre, February 1960
- Bachelor Flat, Piccadilly Theatre, May 1960

Kendall's autobiography was published by MacDonald & Co in 1960; it was called I Remember Romanos.

In his later years Kendal suffered from heart trouble. He had to give up work for a while in 1957 after a heart attack. In February 1960 he was hospitalised after suffering another attack at his house in Hampstead. He had a final, fatal attack while staying at Le Rayol in the South of France, on 9 June 1962, at the age of 65. He was unmarried.

== Notes, references and sources ==
=== Sources ===
- Parker, John; Freda Gaye; Ian Herbert (1978). Who Was Who in the Theatre. Detroit: Gale Research. OCLC 310466458.
