= Keep It Quiet =

- Opening titles
- Directed by: Leslie S. Hiscott
- Written by: Michael Barringer
- Produced by: Herbert Smith
- Starring: Frank Pettingell; Jane Carr; Davy Burnaby
- Production company: British Lion
- Distributed by: Metro-Goldwyn-Mayer
- Release date: 26 December 1934
- Running time: 64 minutes
- Country: United Kingdom
- Language: English

Keep it Quiet is a 1934 British crime film directed by Leslie S. Hiscott and starring Bertha Belmore, Frank Pettingell, Cyril Raymond and Davy Burnaby. It was written by Michael Barringer and made at Beaconsfield Studios as a quota quickie.

== Plot summary ==
Joe Puddlefoot becomes involved with criminals trying to steal valuable jade pieces belonging to the distinguished Sir Charles Goode.

== Cast ==
- Frank Pettingell as Joe Puddlefoot
- Jane Carr as Nancy
- Davy Burnaby as Sir Charles Good
- Cyril Raymond as Jack
- D. A. Clarke-Smith as Vendervell
- Bertha Belmore as Mrs. Puddlefoot

== Reception ==
Kine Weekly wrote: "Straightforward farcical comedy, a trifle leisurely in tempo, but based upon complications that never fail to amuse and delight the masses. The star is in good fettle and makes an excellent pivot in the lead, the supporting cast is well up to standard, and no fault could be found with the presentation. ... Frank Pettingell plavs Joe and makes good use of the bright gags worked into the part, Jane Carr and Cyril Raymond bring delightful recognition to the love interest, and Dave Burnaby and Bertha Belmore contribute sterling support. ... The comedy and the simple romantic sentiments are refreshing, and complete the picture by investing it with the popular touch."

The Daily Film Renter wrote: "Slender comedy of highly respectable provincial man blackmailed in London into assisting gang of crooks. ... Unimaginative direction; film lacks punch, but settings are adequate, while portrayals by leading players are satisfactory."
