= The Spare Room (film) =

1932 film

- Directed by: Redd Davis
- Written by: Marriott Edgar
- Starring: Jimmy James; Ruth Taylor; Charles Paton
- Cinematography: Desmond Dickinson
- Production company: Stoll Picture Productions
- Distributed by: Producers Distributing Corporation
- Release date: 20 June 1932
- Running time: 34 minutes
- Country: United Kingdom
- Language: English

The Spare Room is a 1932 British comedy film directed by Redd Davis and starring Jimmy James, Ruth Taylor, Charles Paton and Alice O'Day. The screenplay concerns a drunken husband, arriving home late, who faces the wrath of his wife and extended family. A featurette, it was shot at Cricklewood Studios as a quota quickie.

== Cast ==
- Jimmy James as Jimmy
- Ruth Taylor as Mrs. James
- Charles Paton as Mr. Webster
- Alice O'Day as Mrs. Webster
- Charles Courtneidge as Jones
- Roland Gillett as Hiram Harris
- Kathleen Joyce as Rita
- Charles Farrell as Boxer
