= Betty Astell =

English actress (1912–2005)

- Bridgewater 3rd Series of Movie Star Trading Cards (1934)
- Born: Betty Julia Hymans; 23 May 1912; Willesden, Middlesex, England, UK
- Died: 26 July 2005 (aged 93); Guernsey, Channel Islands, UK
- Occupation: Actress
- Spouse: Cyril Fletcher (m. 1941; died 2005)
- Children: 1

Betty Astell (born Betty Julia Hymans; 23 May 1912 – 26 July 2005) was an English actress, best known for comedy and pantomime productions on stage, screen, and radio with her husband, Cyril Fletcher. She was one of the first performers to appear on television, in experimental broadcasts by the BBC in 1932.

== Early life ==
Betty Julia Hymans was born in Brondesbury, Willesden, Middlesex, the daughter of Herbert Hymans and Estella Oppenheimer Hymans.

== Career ==
=== Radio ===
Astell was a child performer, trained as a dancer. She sang on BBC Radio programmes in the 1920s, and met her husband while making recordings for radio in Bristol during World War II. In 1956 and 1957, they played a married couple in a radio comedy, Mixed Doubles, written by Bob Monkhouse and Denis Goodwin.

=== Television ===
In 1931 and 1932, Astell sang and danced in John Logie Baird's experimental television programming, on the BBC's 30-line shows, making her one of the first people to perform on television. That same year, she played Alice in Dick Whittington, the first televised pantomime. She starred with her husband on an early sketch show for television, Kaleidoscope (1949), and on his eponymous television series, The Cyril Fletcher Show, on ITV beginning in 1959.

=== Stage and film ===
Astell made her London stage debut in John Galsworthy's Escape (1928). She performed in revues through the 1940s, including Magic Carpet (1943) and Keep Going (1944).

Astell first appeared in film in 1932, in A Tight Corner with Frank Pettingell. She stayed active in film through the 1930s, appearing in two dozen films. In 1942, the Fletchers were familiar enough to a wide audience to make a wartime newsreel clip together, honouring farmers. Her last film role came in 1948, when she returned to the screen in A Piece of Cake, co-starring with her husband.

Astell also wrote and produced pantomimes at the Ashcroft Theatre in Croydon, including Dick Whittington, Mother Goose, Sleeping Beauty, Cinderella, and Aladdin.

== Personal life ==
Astell was married to entertainer Cyril Fletcher for more than 60 years, from 18 May 1941 until his death on 1 January 2005. They had a daughter, actress/comedian Jill Fletcher, born in 1945. Astell died in a hospital near her home in Guernsey, aged 93 years, nearly seven months after the death of her husband.

== Filmography ==
=== Film ===
Year	Title	Role	Notes
1932	Double Dealing	Flossie	
1932	A Tight Corner	Unknown role	
1933	The Lost Chord	Madge	
1933	Cleaning Up	Marian Brent	
1933	Great Stuff	Vera Montgomery	
1933	This is the Life	Edna Wynne	
1933	The Medicine Man	Patient	
1933	That's My Wife	Lillian Harbottle	
1933	Strike It Rich	Janet Wells	
1933	I'll Stick to You	Pauline Mason	
1934	On the Air	Betty	
1934	Flat No. 3	Trixie	
1934	The Man I Want	Prue Darrell	
1934	The Life of the Party	Blanche Hopkins	
1934	Josser on the Farm	Betty	
1935	That's My Uncle	Maudie	
1935	Strictly Illegal	Mrs. Bill	
1936	A Wife or Two	Mary Hamilton	
1936	The Vandergilt Diamond Mystery	Mary	
1936	Jack of All Trades	Dancer	
1936	Sunshine Ahead	The Girl	
1937	Behind Your Back	Gwen Bingham	
1939	The Mind of Mr. Reeder	Gwen Bingham	
1948	A Piece of Cake	Betty Clarke	

=== Television ===
Year	Title	Role	Notes
1959	The Cyril Fletcher Show		6 episodes
