= Drusilla Wills =

British actress (1884–1951)

- in A Girl Must Live (1939)
- Born: 14 November 1884; London, England
- Died: 6 August 1951 (aged 66); London, England
- Years active: 1902–1949

Drusilla Wills (14 November 1884 – 6 August 1951) was a British stage and film actress. After making her stage debut in 1902, she played character roles in many films, including as a jury member in Alfred Hitchcock's Murder! (1930).

== Selected filmography ==
- What the Butler Saw (1924)
- To What Red Hell (1929)
- Murder! (1930)
- The Lodger (1932)
- Little Miss Nobody (1933)
- Britannia of Billingsgate (1933)
- The Medicine Man (1933)
- The Black Abbot (1934)
- The Night Club Queen (1934)
- The Big Splash (1935)
- Squibs (1935)
- Non-Stop New York (1937)
- The High Command (1938)
- A Spot of Bother (1938)
- Yellow Sands (1938)
- The Man in Grey (1943)
- Welcome, Mr. Washington (1944)
- Champagne Charlie (1944)
- Johnny Frenchman (1945)
- The Queen of Spades (1949)
