= The Girl in Possession =

1934 film

- Monty Banks on the film's set
- Directed by: Monty Banks
- Written by: Monty Banks
- Produced by: Irving Asher
- Starring: Laura La Plante; Henry Kendall; Claude Hulbert
- Cinematography: Basil Emmott
- Distributed by: Warner Brothers-First National Productions
- Release date: March 1934
- Running time: 72 minutes
- Country: United Kingdom
- Language: English

The Girl in Possession is a 1934 British comedy film directed and written by Monty Banks and starring Laura La Plante and Henry Kendall.

== Plot ==
Wisecracking New York girl Eve Chandler learns that she has inherited a large country estate in England. She crosses the Atlantic with her friend Julie, only to find that things are not as straightforward as she had been led to believe. Complications ensue as she crosses paths with silly-ass toff Cedric, unscrupulous continental lothario Caruso and snobbish butler Saunders before she manages to sort matters out with the help of the kindly Sir Mortimer, with whom she falls in love.

== Cast ==
- Laura La Plante as Eve Chandler
- Henry Kendall as Sir Mortimer
- Claude Hulbert as Cedric
- Monty Banks as Caruso
- Bernard Nedell as de Courville
- Charles Paton as Saunders
- Millicent Wolf as Julie Garner
- Ernest Seton as Wagstaff

== Production ==
The film was a quota quickie production shot at Twickenham Studios.

== Reception ==
Kine Weekly wrote: "Refreshing farcical comedy which runs a gauntlet of merry humour from New York to England and finds its artless but popular fun mainly in the individual efforts of Monte Banks and Claude Hulbert, both of whom cut lively capers."

The Daily Film Renter wrote: "Number of old comedy gags trotted out afresh, but treatment on snappy lines, providing succession of laughs. Acting on free farce lines, with rib-tickling performances from Claude Hulbert and Monty. Banks. Safe second feature for the popular house."

Picture Show wrote: "Amusing incidents and complications occur on both sides of the Atlantic. Pleasant and wholesome entertainment; Claude Hulbert scores a success. Photography and English settings are excellent."

== Preservation ==
The British Film Institute has classed The Girl in Possession as a lost film. Its National Archive holds a collection of stills but no film or video materials.
