= Michael Barringer =

British writer, screenwriter and playwright (1884–1954)

Michael Barringer (30 July 1885 – ) was a British writer, screenwriter and playwright. He also occasionally served as film director, directing four films early in his career. His play Inquest was the first performed at the Windmill Theatre when it opened in 1931.

He was born in 1884, and died, aged 70, in 1954.

== Selected filmography ==
Writer

- Inquest (1931)
- The Right to Live (1932)
- Double Dealing (1932)
- In a Monastery Garden (1932)
- Frail Women (1932)
- A Tight Corner (1932)
- Murder at Covent Garden (1932)
- I'll Stick to You (1933)
- Cleaning Up (1933)
- The Stickpin (1933)
- Marooned (1933)
- Yes, Madam (1933)
- Strike It Rich (1933)
- That's My Wife (1933)
- On the Air (1934)
- Keep It Quiet (1934)
- Without You (1934)
- The Man I Want (1934)
- A Glimpse of Paradise (1934)
- Crazy People (1934)
- Flat Number Three (1934)
- Passing Shadows (1934)
- Death on the Set (1935)
- The Big Splash (1935)
- That's My Uncle (1935)
- Sexton Blake and the Mademoiselle (1935)
- Annie, Leave the Room! (1935)
- The Price of a Song (1935)
- Three Witnesses (1935)
- The Black Mask (1935)
- Rhodes of Africa (1936)
- Fame (1936)
- Gaol Break (1936)
- Mother, Don't Rush Me (1936)
- Cheer Up (1936)
- The Interrupted Honeymoon (1936)
- The Great Barrier (1937)
- Fine Feathers (1937)
- The Angelus (1937)
- Millions (1937)
- Double or Quits (1938)
- Yellow Sands (1938)
- Annie, Leave the Room! (1935)
- The Seventh Survivor (1941)

Director

- The Infamous Lady (1928)
- Q-Ships (1928)
- Down Channel (1929)
- Murder at Covent Garden (1932)
