= List of British Lion films =

This is a list of films released by the British studio British Lion Films which was established in 1927 during the silent era. In its early years the company produced adaptations of Edgar Wallace crime novels, and later focused mainly on quota quickies. After the Second World War British Lion was acquired by Alexander Korda and it became a distribution outlet for independent British films with government backing.

While British Lion distributed many foreign films in Britain, such as a large number of Republic Pictures productions, these are not included in the list,

== 1920s ==
Title	Release date	Director
The Man Who Changed His Name	1928	A.V. Bramble
The Ringer	August 1928	Arthur Maude
Chick	August 1928	A.V. Bramble
The Valley of Ghosts	December 1928	G.B. Samuelson
The Forger	December 1928	G.B. Samuelson
The Flying Squad	January 1929	Arthur Maude
The Clue of the New Pin	March 1929	Arthur Maude

== 1930s ==
Title	Release date	Director
The Squeaker	June 1930	Edgar Wallace
Should a Doctor Tell?	September 1930	Manning Haynes
Red Aces	November 1930	Edgar Wallace
To Oblige a Lady	February 1931	Manning Haynes
The Ringer	April 1931	Walter Forde
The Calendar	October 1931	T. Hayes Hunter
The Old Man	December 1931	Manning Haynes
The Beggar Student	December 1931	Victor Hanbury
Where Is This Lady?	1932	Victor Hanbury, Ladislao Vajda
The Frightened Lady	March 1932	T. Hayes Hunter
White Face	May 1932	T. Hayes Hunter
The Flying Squad	July 1932	F.W. Kraemer
Sally Bishop	October 1932	T. Hayes Hunter
There Goes the Bride	October 1932	Albert de Courville
I'll Stick to You	1933	Leslie S. Hiscott
Yes, Madam	February 1933	Leslie S. Hiscott
That's My Wife	March 1933	Leslie S. Hiscott
King of the Ritz	March 1933	Carmine Gallone, Herbert Smith
Cleaning Up	May 1933	Leslie S. Hiscott
The Stickpin	June 1933	Leslie S. Hiscott
Great Stuff	June 1933	Leslie S. Hiscott
This Is the Life	September 1933	Leslie S. Hiscott
Strike It Rich	November 1933	Leslie S. Hiscott
Marooned	November 1933	Leslie S. Hiscott
Flat Number Three	January 1934	Leslie S. Hiscott
On the Air	January 1934	Herbert Smith
Keep It Quiet	March 1934	Leslie S. Hiscott
The Man I Want	March 1934	Leslie S. Hiscott
Passing Shadows	May 1934	Leslie S. Hiscott
Warn London	May 1934	T. Hayes Hunter
Without You	July 1934	John Daumery
Gay Love	September 1934	Leslie S. Hiscott
The Green Pack	October 1934	T. Hayes Hunter
Crazy People	October 1934	Leslie S. Hiscott
The Big Splash	1935	Leslie S. Hiscott
Marry the Girl	1935	Maclean Rogers
Charing Cross Road	1935	Albert de Courville
Ten Minute Alibi	January 1935	Bernard Vorhaus
In Town Tonight	January 1935	Herbert Smith
The Case of Gabriel Perry	May 1935	Albert de Courville
Night Mail	May 1935	Herbert Smith
Line Engaged	November 1935	Bernard Mainwaring
The Happy Family	1936	Maclean Rogers
It's You I Want	1936	Ralph Ince
Jury's Evidence	January 1936	Ralph Ince
A Wife or Two	January 1936	Maclean Rogers
Soft Lights and Sweet Music	February 1936	Herbert Smith
They Didn't Know	April 1936	Herbert Smith
Sporting Love	May 1936	J. Elder Wills
The Interrupted Honeymoon	June 1936	Leslie S. Hiscott
Song of Freedom	August 1936	J. Elder Wills
Treachery on the High Seas	December 1936	Emil E. Reinert
Skylarks	December 1936	Thornton Freeland
A Romance in Flanders	1937	Maurice Elvey
The Live Wire	1937	Herbert Brenon
Leave It to Me	1937	Herbert Smith
It's a Grand Old World	January 1937	Herbert Smith
Fine Feathers	1937	Leslie S. Hiscott
Calling All Stars	March 1937	Herbert Smith
Big Fella	April 1937	J. Elder Wills
Melody and Romance	December 1937	Maurice Elvey
Around the Town	1938	Herbert Smith
Blondes for Danger	1938	Jack Raymond
Stardust	March 1938	Melville W. Brown
No Parking	July 1938	Jack Raymond
I've Got a Horse	September 1938	Herbert Smith
The Return of the Frog	November 1938	Maurice Elvey
Old Iron	December 1938	Tom Walls
What a Man!	December 1938	Edmond T. Gréville
The Face at the Window	April 1939	George King
Home from Home	April 1939	Herbert Smith
Riding High	December 1939	David MacDonald

== 1940s ==
Title	Release date	Director
All at Sea	February 1940	Herbert Smith
Crimes at the Dark House	March 1940	George King
The Chinese Bungalow	April 1940	George King
Under Your Hat	September 1940	Maurice Elvey
The Case of the Frightened Lady	September 1940	George King
You Will Remember	February 1941	Jack Raymond
Alibi	August 1942	Brian Desmond Hurst
In Which We Serve	September 1942	Noël Coward, David Lean
Tomorrow We Live	April 1943	George King
Candlelight in Algeria	March 1944	George King
A Girl in a Million	October 1946	Francis Searle
The Grand Escapade	January 1947	John Baxter
Code of Scotland Yard	March 1947	George King
White Cradle Inn	March 1947	Harold French
The Courtneys of Curzon Street	April 1947	Herbert Wilcox
A Man About the House	October 1947	Leslie Arliss
An Ideal Husband	November 1947	Alexander Korda
Mine Own Executioner	November 1947	Anthony Kimmins
Night Beat	December 1947	Harold Huth
Anna Karenina	January 1948	Julien Duvivier
Nothing Venture	January 1948	John Baxter
Call of the Blood	February 1948	John Clements, Ladislao Vajda
Spring in Park Lane	March 1948	Herbert Wilcox
House of Darkness	October 1948	Oswald Mitchell
The Fallen Idol	October 1948	Carol Reed
Bonnie Prince Charlie	October 1948	Anthony Kimmins
The Winslow Boy	November 1948	Anthony Asquith
The Small Voice	November 1948	Fergus McDonell
Elizabeth of Ladymead	December 1948	Herbert Wilcox
Forbidden	February 1949	George King
The Last Days of Dolwyn	April 1949	Emlyn Williams
That Dangerous Age	April 1949	Gregory Ratoff
Saints and Sinners	August 1949	Leslie Arliss
The Third Man	September 1949	Carol Reed
Maytime in Mayfair	September 1949	Herbert Wilcox
The Interrupted Journey	October 1949	Daniel Birt
Children of Chance	October 1949	Luigi Zampa
The Cure for Love	December 1949	Robert Donat

== 1950s ==
Title	Release date	Director
The Happiest Days of Your Life	March 1950	Frank Launder
The Angel with the Trumpet	March 1950	Anthony Bushell
Chance of a Lifetime	April 1950	Bernard Miles
My Daughter Joy	August 1950	Gregory Ratoff
State Secret	September 1950	Sidney Gilliat
Odette	October 1950	Herbert Wilcox
The Wooden Horse	October 1950	Jack Lee
Seven Days to Noon	October 1950	Boulting Brothers
Gone to Earth	November 1950	Powell and Pressburger
The Elusive Pimpernel	November 1950	Powell and Pressburger
The Naked Heart	November 1950	Marc Allégret
Into the Blue	December 1950	Herbert Wilcox
The Long Dark Hall	February 1951	Reginald Beck, Anthony Bushell
Flesh and Blood	April 1951	Anthony Kimmins
The Tales of Hoffmann	April 1951	Powell and Pressburger
The Magic Box	September 1951	Boulting Brothers
The Lady with a Lamp	September 1951	Herbert Wilcox
Lady Godiva Rides Again	October 1951	Frank Launder
Green Grow the Rushes	November 1951	Derek Twist
The Wonder Kid	November 1951	Karl Hartl
Mr. Denning Drives North	December 1951	Anthony Kimmins
Outcast of the Islands	January 1952	Carol Reed
Sing Along with Me	February 1952	Peter Graham Scott
Home at Seven	March 1952	Ralph Richardson
Cry, the Beloved Country	April 1952	Zoltan Korda
Derby Day	May 1952	Herbert Wilcox
Who Goes There!	June 1952	Anthony Kimmins
The Sound Barrier	July 1952	David Lean
Folly to Be Wise	December 1952	Frank Launder
The Ringer	December 1952	Guy Hamilton
The Holly and the Ivy	December 1952	George More O'Ferrall
Moulin Rouge	December 1952	John Huston
The Story of Gilbert and Sullivan	February 1953	Sidney Gilliat
Appointment in London	February 1953	Philip Leacock
The Captain's Paradise	June 1953	Anthony Kimmins
The Beggar's Opera	June 1953	Peter Brook
Twice Upon a Time	July 1953	Emeric Pressburger
The Man Between	October 1953	Carol Reed
The Intruder	October 1953	Guy Hamilton
The Heart of the Matter	November 1953	George More O'Ferrall
The Stranger's Hand	January 1954	Mario Soldati
Front Page Story	January 1954	Gordon Parry
They Who Dare	February 1954	Lewis Milestone
An Inspector Calls	March 1954	Guy Hamilton
Eight O'Clock Walk	March 1954	Lance Comfort
Bang! You're Dead	March 1954	Lance Comfort
Devil on Horseback	March 1954	Cyril Frankel
Conflict of Wings	March 1954	John Eldridge
Hobson's Choice	April 1954	David Lean
Devil Girl from Mars	May 1954	David MacDonald
Malaga	June 1954	Richard Sale
Twist of Fate (1954 film) (U.S. Beautiful Stranger)	July 1954	David Miller
The Green Scarf	August 1954	George More O'Ferrall
The Angel Who Pawned Her Harp	September 1954	Alan Bromly
The Belles of St. Trinian's	September 1954	Frank Launder
The Teckman Mystery	October 1954	Wendy Toye
Orders Are Orders	October 1954	David Paltenghi
Aunt Clara	November 1954	Anthony Kimmins
The Colditz Story	January 1955	Guy Hamilton
The Man Who Loved Redheads	February 1955	Harold French
Raising a Riot	February 1955	Wendy Toye
Three Cases of Murder	February 1955	Various
The Love Match	February 1955	David Paltenghi
The Constant Husband	April 1955	Sidney Gilliat
Make Me an Offer	May 1955	Cyril Frankel
See How They Run	June 1955	Leslie Arliss
John and Julie	July 1955	William Fairchild
Stolen Assignment	July 1955	Terence Fisher
Geordie	September 1955	Frank Launder
King's Rhapsody	October 1955	Herbert Wilcox
Stolen Time	October 1955	Charles Deane
Josephine and Men	November 1955	Boulting Brothers
The Blue Peter	November 1955	Wolf Rilla
Alias John Preston	December 1955	David MacDonald
Fun at St. Fanny's	December 1955	Maurice Elvey
Private's Progress	February 1956	Boulting Brothers
The Secret Tent	February 1956	Don Chaffey
Doublecross	February 1956	Anthony Squire
The March Hare	April 1956	George More O'Ferrall
Charley Moon	May 1956	Guy Hamilton
Ramsbottom Rides Again	May 1956	John Baxter
Pacific Destiny	June 1956	Wolf Rilla
My Teenage Daughter	June 1956	Herbert Wilcox
Thunderstorm	June 1956	John Guillermin
The Extra Day	June 1956	William Fairchild
The Baby and the Battleship	July 1956	Jay Lewis
The Green Man	September 1956	Robert Day, Basil Dearden
A Hill in Korea	September 1956	Julian Amyes
Loser Takes All	September 1956	Ken Annakin
Stars in Your Eyes	December 1956	Maurice Elvey
The Passionate Stranger	February 1957	Muriel Box
Brothers in Law	March 1957	Boulting Brothers
Yangtse Incident	April 1957	Michael Anderson
The Smallest Show on Earth	April 1957	Basil Dearden
Second Fiddle	June 1957	Maurice Elvey
Lucky Jim	September 1957	Boulting Brothers
The Truth About Women	October 1957	Muriel Box
The Birthday Present	October 1957	Pat Jackson
Blue Murder at St Trinian's	December 1957	Frank Launder
The Man Who Wouldn't Talk	January 1958	Herbert Wilcox
Happy Is the Bride	March 1958	Boulting Brothers
Law and Disorder	June 1958	Charles Crichton
Orders to Kill	July 1958	Anthony Asquith
Next to No Time	August 1958	Henry Cornelius
Chain of Events	September 1958	Gerald Thomas
The Man Upstairs	September 1958	Don Chaffey
Behind the Mask	October 1958	Brian Desmond Hurst
Virgin Island	October 1958	Pat Jackson
Sally's Irish Rogue	November 1958	George Pollock
The Solitary Child	December 1958	Gerald Thomas
Passport to Shame	February 1959	Alvin Rakoff
Danger Within	February 1959	Don Chaffey
Subway in the Sky	February 1959	Muriel Box
Make Mine a Million	February 1959	John Baxter
Model for Murder	February 1959	Terry Bishop
Broth of a Boy	February 1959	George Pollock
Carlton-Browne of the F.O.	March 1959	Boulting Brothers
Left Right and Centre	June 1959	Sidney Gilliat
The Treasure of San Teresa	July 1959	Alvin Rakoff
The Bridal Path	August 1959	Frank Launder
I'm All Right Jack	August 1959	Boulting Brothers
Jet Storm	September 1959	Cy Endfield
Friends and Neighbours	November 1959	Gordon Parry
Expresso Bongo	December 1959	Val Guest

== 1960s ==
Title	Release date	Director
Two-Way Stretch	January 1960	Robert Day
Life Is a Circus	February 1960	Val Guest
The Battle of the Sexes	February 1960	Charles Crichton
The Angry Silence	March 1960	Guy Green
Dead Lucky	June 1960	Montgomery Tully
The Entertainer	July 1960	Tony Richardson
A French Mistress	August 1960	Boulting Brothers
The City of the Dead	September 1960	John Llewellyn Moxey
Foxhole in Cairo	October 1960	John Llewellyn Moxey
Suspect	November 1960	Boulting Brothers
The Pure Hell of St Trinian's	December 1960	Frank Launder
Two Letter Alibi	1961	Robert Lynn
Offbeat	1961	Cliff Owen
The Night We Got the Bird	February 1961	Darcy Conyers
Two Living, One Dead	March 1961	Anthony Asquith
Nearly a Nasty Accident	May 1961	Don Chaffey
The Impersonator	May 1961	Alfred Shaughnessy
The Devil's Daffodil	May 1961	Ákos Ráthonyi
The Kitchen	August 1961	James Hill
A Taste of Honey	September 1961	Tony Richardson
Nothing Barred	October 1961	Darcy Conyers
The Day the Earth Caught Fire	November 1961	Val Guest
Part-Time Wife	December 1961	Max Varnel
The Barber of Stamford Hill	January 1962	Caspar Wrede
Only Two Can Play	January 1962	Sidney Gilliat
Mrs. Gibbons' Boys	April 1962	Max Varnel
Mix Me a Person	August 1962	Leslie Norman
Dead Man's Evidence	August 1962	Francis Searle
The Devil's Agent	September 1962	John Paddy Carstairs
The L-Shaped Room	November 1962	Bryan Forbes
The Wrong Arm of the Law	March 1963	Cliff Owen
The Very Edge	April 1963	Cyril Frankel
The Small World of Sammy Lee	April 1963	Ken Hughes
Heavens Above!	May 1963	Boulting Brothers
Lord of the Flies	May 1963	Peter Brook
A Place to Go	July 1963	Basil Dearden
Walk a Tightrope	August 1963	Frank Nesbitt
It's All Happening	August 1963	Don Sharp
Station Six-Sahara	September 1963	Seth Holt
The Man Who Finally Died	December 1963	Quentin Lawrence
The Silent Playground	December 1963	Stanley Goulder
Mystery Submarine	December 1963	C.M. Pennington-Richards
It's All Over Town	January 1964	Douglas Hickox
Ladies Who Do	January 1964	C.M. Pennington-Richards
Hide and Seek	March 1964	Cy Endfield
A Jolly Bad Fellow	May 1964	Don Chaffey
Ring of Spies	May 1964	Robert Tronson
Just for You	June 1964	Douglas Hickox
Do You Know This Voice?	June 1964	Frank Nesbitt
Victim Five	July 1964	Robert Lynn
The Comedy Man	September 1964	Alvin Rakoff
Troubled Waters	December 1964	Stanley Goulder
Mozambique	December 1964	Robert Lynn
Joey Boy	1965	Frank Launder
A Home of Your Own	January 1965	Jay Lewis
Catacombs	May 1965	Gordon Hessler
Two Left Feet	May 1965	Roy Ward Baker
Rotten to the Core	July 1965	Boulting Brothers
San Ferry Ann	July 1965	Jeremy Summers
He Who Rides a Tiger	October 1965	Charles Crichton
Morgan: A Suitable Case for Treatment	January 1966	Karel Reisz
The Great St. Trinian's Train Robbery	March 1966	Sidney Gilliat, Frank Launder
The Uncle	1966	Desmond Davis
The Boy Cried Murder	November 1966	George Breakston
The Family Way	December 1966	Boulting Brothers
Ulysses	June 1967	Joseph Strick
The Girl on a Motorcycle	October 1968	Jack Cardiff
Twisted Nerve	December 1968	Boulting Brothers
Till Death Us Do Part	January 1969	Norman Cohen
A Touch of Love	September 1969	Waris Hussein

== 1970s ==
Title	Release date	Director
Every Home Should Have One	March 1970	Jim Clark
Three Sisters	November 1970	Laurence Olivier, John Sichel
Bartleby	November 1970	Anthony Friedman
Loot	December 1970	Silvio Narizzano
Melody	April 1971	Waris Hussein
Fright	November 1971	Peter Collinson
I, Monster	November 1971	Stephen Weeks
Kidnapped	December 1971	Delbert Mann
Mr. Forbush and the Penguins	December 1971	Roy Boulting
Endless Night	October 1972	Sidney Gilliat
Ooh… You Are Awful	December 1972	Cliff Owen
The Love Ban	January 1973	Ralph Thomas
The Lovers!	May 1973	Herbert Wise
A Doll's House	October 1973	Joseph Losey
Don't Look Now	October 1973	Nicolas Roeg
The Wicker Man	December 1973	Robin Hardy
Who?	April 1974	Jack Gold
The Beast Must Die	April 1974	Paul Annett
The Internecine Project	September 1974	Ken Hughes
The Land That Time Forgot	November 1974	Kevin Connor
Ransom	February 1975	Caspar Wrede
Conduct Unbecoming	September 1975	Michael Anderson
The Man Who Fell to Earth	March 1976	Nicolas Roeg
At the Earth's Core	July 1976	Kevin Connor
Nickelodeon	December 1976	Peter Bogdanovich

== 1980s ==
Title	Release date	Director
Britannia Hospital	May 1982	Lindsay Anderson

== 2010s ==
Title	Release date	Director
The Wicker Tree	August 2011	Robin Hardy

== See also ==
- List of Gainsborough Pictures films
- List of Ealing Studios films
- List of Stoll Pictures films
- List of British and Dominions films
- List of Two Cities Films
- List of British National films
- List of General Film Distributors films
- List of Paramount British films

== Bibliography ==
- Low, Rachael. History of the British Film, 1918–1929. George Allen & Unwin, 1971.
- Wood, Linda. British Films, 1927–1939. British Film Institute, 1986.
