= Norman G. Arnold =

British art director (1892–1963)

- Born: 19 September 1892; Leigh, Lancashire, United Kingdom
- Died: 7 December 1963 (aged 71); Harrow, Middlesex, United Kingdom
- Other name: Norman Gregory Arnold
- Occupation: Art director
- Years active: 1922-1963 (film)

Norman G. Arnold (19 September 1892 – 7 December 1963) was a British art director who designed the sets for over a hundred and twenty films.

== Early life and World War I ==
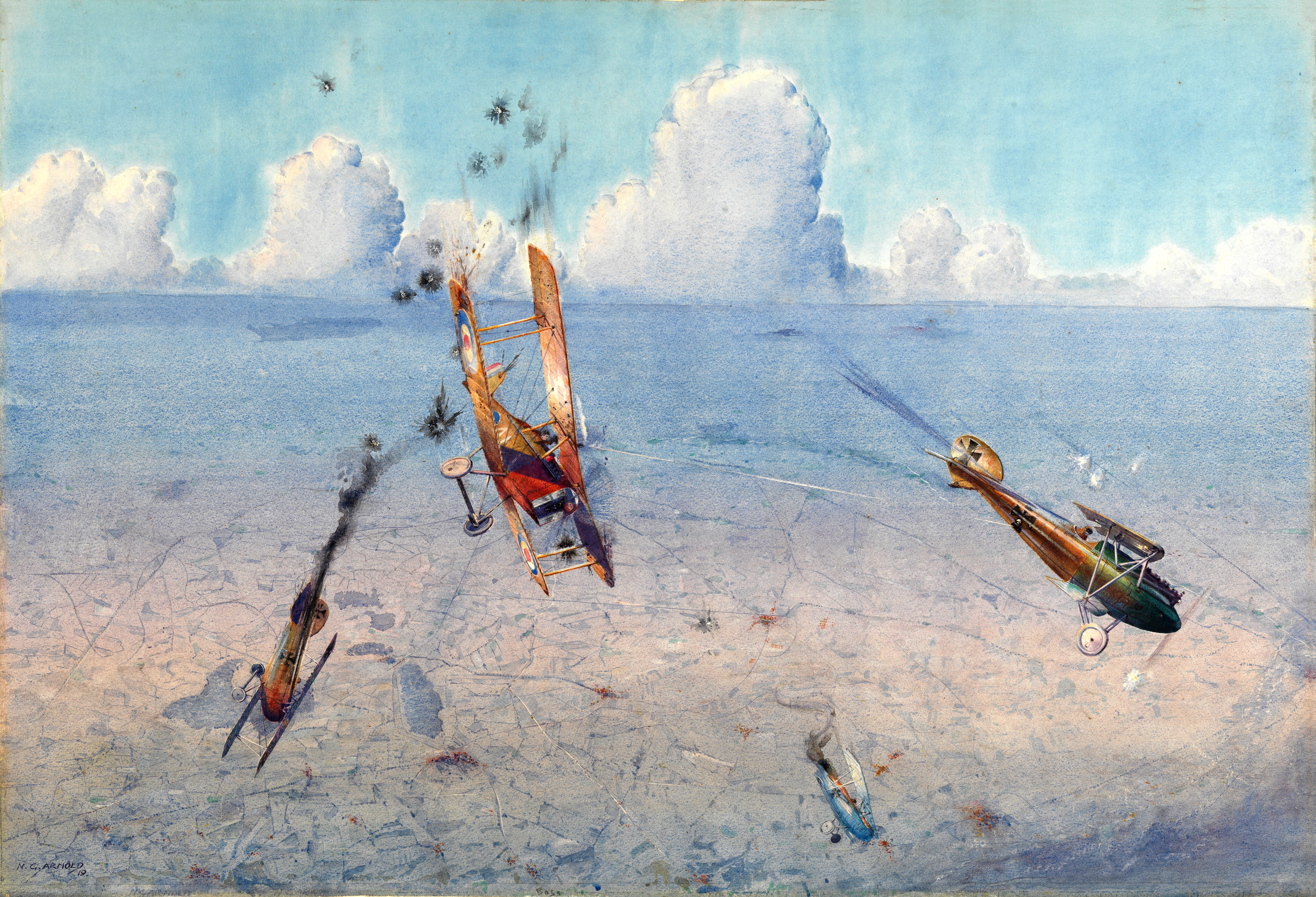
The Last Fight of Captain Ball, VC, DSO and 2 Bars, MC, 7 May 1917 by Norman G. Arnold, 1919

Arnold studied architecture, interior decoration & design. During the First World War, Arnold served in the Royal Flying Corps with the rank of Lieutenant and worked in the Armaments School. In 1918, Arnold was appointed to be an official war artist, tasked with portraying types of aircraft, methods of aerial fighting and specific famous air battles on the Western Front. He produced a number of water-colour paintings which are now housed in the Imperial War Museum in London, including the 24 x 36 inch painting The Last Flight of Albert Ball VC.

== Film career ==
Arnold entered the film industry in 1920 in the silent era. His first employer was Famous Players Lasky Corporation for which he was the art designer on eight films before he began working for British producer Herbert Wilcox in 1922, working on films in Berlin such as Decameron Nights in 1924. Between 1927 and 1946, Arnold served as an Art Director for a number of film companies including British Lion, First National and Independent Companies. By 1948, Arnold had been art director on over 150 feature films. In the early 1940s, he was employed by Warner Brothers at Teddington Studios. In 1947 he designed the sets for Hue and Cry, the first of the Ealing Comedies. Much of his later career was spent designing for low-budget second features, particularly for the Danziger Brothers. His final work was on the Cold War thriller Ring of Spies, a more prestigious production, which was completed after his death.

His brother Wilfred Arnold was also an art director.

== Filmography ==
- Chu-Chin Chow (1923)
- Decameron Nights (1924)
- The Only Way (1926)
- Nell Gwyn (1926)
- After the Verdict (1929)
- Blackmail (1929)
- The Plaything (1929)
- Juno and the Paycock (1930)
- Sally in Our Alley (1931)
- A Honeymoon Adventure (1931)
- In a Lotus Garden (1931)
- The Ringer (1931)
- The Old Man (1931)
- The Beggar Student (1931)
- There Goes the Bride (1932)
- Sally Bishop (1932)
- The Frightened Lady (1932)
- The Flying Squad (1932)
- The Water Gipsies (1932)
- White Face (1932)
- That's My Wife (1933)
- The Stickpin (1933)
- King of the Ritz (1933)
- Cleaning Up (1933)
- Great Stuff (1933)
- Passing Shadows (1934)
- On the Air (1934)
- Warn London (1934)
- The Green Pack (1934)
- Gay Love (1934)
- Line Engaged (1935)
- Marry the Girl (1935)
- Charing Cross Road (1935)
- Soft Lights and Sweet Music (1936)
- Public Nuisance No. 1 (1936)
- Sporting Love (1936)
- The Interrupted Honeymoon (1936)
- Song of Freedom (1936)
- Treachery on the High Seas (1936)
- The Happy Family (1936)
- It's You I Want (1936)
- Melody and Romance (1937)
- It's a Grand Old World (1937)
- Fine Feathers (1937)
- Calling All Stars (1937)
- Blondes for Danger (1938)
- The Return of the Frog (1938)
- What a Man! (1938)
- Home from Home (1939)
- Hoots Mon! (1940)
- Sailors Don't Care (1940)
- The Midas Touch (1940)
- That's the Ticket (1940)
- George and Margaret (1940)
- The Prime Minister (1941)
- Atlantic Ferry (1941)
- Flying Fortress (1942)
- The Peterville Diamond (1942)
- This Was Paris (1942)
- Tomorrow We Live (1943)
- They Met in the Dark (1943)
- The Dark Tower (1943)
- Candlelight in Algeria (1944)
- Mr. Emmanuel (1944)
- One Exciting Night (1944)
- The Rake's Progress (1945)
- I See a Dark Stranger (1946)
- Meet Me at Dawn (1947)
- Hue and Cry (1947)
- The White Unicorn (1947)
- Quartet (1948)
- The Blind Goddess (1948)
- Here Come the Huggetts (1948)
- Vote for Huggett (1949)
- The Huggetts Abroad (1949)
- Dance Hall (1950)
- The Galloping Major (1951)
- Circumstantial Evidence (1952)
- Devil Girl from Mars (1954)
- Bang! You're Dead (1954)
- Eight O'Clock Walk (1954)
- Profile (1954)
- Breakaway (1955)
- It's a Great Day (1955)
- Geordie (1955)
- Fun at St. Fanny's (1956)
- The Secret Tent (1956)
- Not So Dusty (1956)
- Sailor Beware! (1956)
- Dry Rot (1956)
- Find the Lady (1956)
- The Hideout (1956)
- After the Ball (1957)
- Account Rendered (1957)
- The Big Chance (1957)
- Time Lock (1957)
- The Son of Robin Hood (1958)
- High Jump (1959)
- A Woman's Temptation (1959)
- Top Floor Girl (1959)
- Man Accused (1959)
- Date at Midnight (1959)
- Crash Drive (1959)
- Feet of Clay (1960)
- Compelled (1960)
- Night Train for Inverness (1960)
- For Members Only (1960)
- The Tell-Tale Heart (1960)
- The Spider's Web (1960)
- Identity Unknown (1960)
- Sentenced for Life (1960)
- Escort for Hire (1960)
- An Honourable Murder (1960)
- A Taste of Money (1961)
- Strip Tease Murder (1961)
- Highway to Battle (1961)
- Fate Takes a Hand (1961)
- Tarnished Heroes (1961)
- The Middle Course (1961)
- The Court Martial of Major Keller (1961)
- So Evil, So Young (1961)
- Return of a Stranger (1961)
- The Silent Invasion (1962)
- Stork Talk (1962)
- Ring of Spies (1964)

== Bibliography ==
- Barr, Charles. Ealing Studios. University of California Press, 1998.
