= The Flying Squad =

The Flying Squad may refer to

- Flying Squad, a branch of the Serious and Organised Crime Command within London's Metropolitan Police Service
- commonly used short form of Obstetric Flying Squad
- The Flying Squad (1929 film)
- The Flying Squad (1932 film)
- The Flying Squad (1940 film)
- Flying Squad (TV series)

== See also ==
- Flying Squadron (disambiguation)
