= Marry the Girl =

Marry the Girl may refer to:

- Marry the Girl (play), farce by George Arthurs and Arthur Miller
- Marry the Girl (1928 film), American film directed by Phil Rosen
- Marry the Girl (1935 film), British film directed by Maclean Rogers
- Marry the Girl (1937 film), American film directed by William C. McGann
