= Sandy Powell (comedian) =

English comedian (1900–1982)

Publicity still for All at Sea (1940)

Albert Arthur Powell MBE (30 January 1900 – 26 June 1982), known as Sandy Powell, was an English comedian best known for his radio work of the 1930s and for his catchphrase "Can you hear me, mother?" He first said this in a theatre in Coventry. Fifty years later, deciding he needed a rest from the business (he planned a cruise around the world with his wife, Kay White), he again said it in a Coventry theatre, for the last time.

== Early life ==
Born in Rotherham, Yorkshire, England, in 1900, Sandy Powell's father was a stagehand in the theatre and his mother was an actress. His father abandoned the family when he was four years old. He attended White's school in Masbrough, where he helped his mother (stage name of Lily le Maine) to put on a marionette show. At age nine, she put him in a velvet suit with a lace collar and he went on stage and sang. After he left school he became a music hall entertainer, often wearing a kilt in the guise of a Scottish comedian. During this part of his career he was associated with the singer Gracie Fields, and released several records where he collaborated with her.

== Stage and recording ==
He made a total of eighty-five 78 rpm records between 1929 and 1942, mostly double-sided sketches with him in various occupations. He sold seven and a half million records, earning a penny a side, so over £60,000. The first, The Lost Policeman on the cheap Broadcast label, sold almost half a million copies (he had turned down a flat fee of £60 for this), and his subsequent recordings for Broadcast and Rex were extremely popular. He said in a 1982 interview that he used his stage work to advertise the records, rather than the other way about, though it was later said of him that his records introduced him so wherever he went to put on a show, they already knew him.

Powell's stooge in his act during the 1930s was the boy soprano Jimmy Fletcher, father of the actor Gerard Fletcher, of Emmerdale, Coronation Street and other television series. From 1930 he took his own revue, Sandy Powell's Road Show, on tour – it ran for ten years and was extremely popular despite having only a handful of performers and two backdrops.

== Radio and film ==
In the 1930s he began to work on the radio, always introducing his show with the catchphrase "Can you hear me, mother?" Powell said that the catchphrase originated on an occasion when he had dropped his script and was killing time at the microphone while rearranging the pages. It is also attributed to his mother's coercion and her hardness of hearing, during his early career. At his next booking, the theatre manager asked him to say it again as everyone was saying it now. He also appeared in a number of films during the 1930s, usually as himself, with one of them actually referring to his catchphrase: Can You Hear Me, Mother? (1935). In 1939, he was voted the fifth most popular British star at the local box office.

A popular figure, he worked continually on radio, television and pantomime through the 1940s and 1950s. Aged 21 at the time, Pat Phoenix was brought in to play Sandy's wife and played four parts in Cup-tie Honeymoon. After that he went on to a variety tour and she came with him as his wife, earning £12 a week. He performed with his Starlight company in the Eastbourne Pier theatre for over fifteen seasons in the 1950s and 1960s, earning himself the sobriquet Mr Eastbourne, and he was still performing occasionally up to his death in 1982. Part of his act was a comedy ventriloquism act, where the dummy would fall apart. After being on stage for a few weeks with a series of awful ventriloquists, he bought a dummy himself and did his own act as a ventriloquist. When Pat Phoenix as his wife who "fed him lines" asked if the dummy could sing something, he replied "If I know it, he can sing it!" His real-life wife, Kay White, often appeared with him.

He performed twice in a Royal Variety Performance: both 1935 and 1970. In the latter he appeared with his wife performing his ventriloquist act gone-wrong.

He was the subject of This Is Your Life in 1971 when he was surprised by Eamonn Andrews. He was awarded the MBE in 1975.

== Personal life and death ==
In 1938 Powell separated from his first wife, Dorothy May, and took their two children to raise with him. They divorced in 1940. In 1942 he married Katie Hughes. She committed suicide in December 1946. He married Kay White in 1951.

For a day or two, he thought he had bad indigestion, but it was worse than he realised and he died of a heart attack in Eastbourne on 26 June 1982, he was 82 years old.

A pub in Powell's native Rotherham was named "The Comedian" in his honour. On 13 April 2015 a blue plaque commemorating Powell was erected by the British Music Hall Society and unveiled by the then president Roy Hudd at Powell's former home in Elms Avenue, Eastbourne.

== Filmography ==
- The Third String (1932)
- Can You Hear Me, Mother? (1935)
- Soft Lights and Sweet Music (1936)
- Leave It to Me (1937)
- It's a Grand Old World (1937)
- I've Got a Horse (1938)
- Home from Home (1939)
- All at Sea (1940)
- Cup-tie Honeymoon (1948)
