= Hugh Wakefield =

English actor (1888–1971)

- Born: 1 November 1888; Wanstead, Essex, England
- Died: 5 December 1971 (aged 83); London, England
- Occupation: Film actor
- Military career
- Allegiance: United Kingdom
- Service: Royal Air Force
- War: World War II

Hugh Wakefield (10 November 1888 – 5 December 1971) was an English film actor, who played supporting roles. He was often seen wearing a monocle.

Hugh Claude Wakefield was born in Wanstead, Essex. He also had a distinguished stage career, which began at the age of 11. City of Song (1931) was his first film. After completing 1954's The Million Pound Note, Wakefield retired from film acting. He died 5 December 1971 in London aged 83.

== Stage ==
Wakefield appeared in the original London productions of Between Friends (1930), Take a Chance (1931), Tea for Two (1938), Off the Record (1947), Top Secret (1949), Dead Secret (1952) and The Remarkable Mr. Pennypacker (1955) .

== Personal life ==
Hugh Wakefield served with the RAF during World War II, along with his Blithe Spirit co-star Rex Harrison. He was also an avid sportsman, particularly enjoying golf and tennis. His daughter, Margaret Diana (1933-2015), married the aristocratic jockey Gay Kindersley.

== Selected filmography ==
- City of Song (1931) - Hon. Roddy Fielding
- The Sport of Kings (1931) - Algernon Sprigg
- The Man They Couldn't Arrest (1931) - John Dain
- Life Goes On (1932) - Ridgeway Emsworth
- Aren't We All? (1932) - Lord Grenham
- The Crime at Blossoms (1933) - Chris Merryman
- King of the Ritz (1933) - King of Blitz
- The Fortunate Fool (1933) - Jim Falconer
- The Luck of a Sailor (1934) - King Karl
- Lady in Danger (1934) - King
- The Man Who Knew Too Much (1934) - Clive
- My Heart Is Calling (1935) - Armand Arvelle
- 18 Minutes (1935) - Lord Pilcott
- No Monkey Business (1935) - Prof. Barrington
- Marry the Girl (1935) - Hugh Delafield
- The Improper Duchess (1936) - King of Poldavia
- The Crimson Circle (1936) - Derek Yale
- Forget Me Not (1936) - Mr. Jackson
- The Interrupted Honeymoon (1936) - Uncle John
- Dreams Come True (1936) - Albert von Waldenau
- The Limping Man (1936) - Col. Paget
- It's You I Want (1936) - Otto Gilbert
- The Street Singer (1937) - Hugh Newman
- Death Croons the Blues (1937) - Jim Martin
- The Live Wire (1937) - Grantham
- Runaway Ladies (1938) - Lord Ramsden
- Make It Three (1938) - Percy Higgin
- This England (1941) - Vicar
- Blithe Spirit (1945) - Dr. George Bradman
- Journey Together (1945) - Acting Lieutenant
- One Night With You (1948) - Santell
- No Highway in the Sky (1951) - Sir David Moon, Airline President (uncredited)
- Love's a Luxury (1952) - Charles Pentwick
- The Million Pound Note (1954) - Duke of Cromarty
