= John Turnbull (actor) =

Scottish actor (1880–1956)

- in The Night of the Party (1934)
- Born: 5 November 1880; Dunbar, East Lothian, Scotland
- Died: 23 February 1956 (aged 75); Marylebone, West London, England
- Years active: 1920–1950

John Turnbull (5 November 1880 – 23 February 1956) was a British stage and film actor. He was married to Eve Marchew and Beatrice Alice Scott (actress).

== Selected filmography ==
- The Amazing Quest of Mr. Ernest Bliss (1920) - Willie Mott
- Tons of Money (1930) - Sprules
- Rodney Steps In (1931, Short) - Inspector
- 77 Park Lane (1931) - Superintendent
- The Man at Six (1931) - Inspector Dawford
- Keepers of Youth (1931) - Gordon Duff
- Detective Lloyd (1932, Serial) - Barclay - Scotland Yard Superindendant
- Murder on the Second Floor (1932) - Inspector
- The Wickham Mystery (1932) - Howard Clayton
- A Voice Said Goodnight (1932, Short) - Inspector Lavory
- The Midshipmaid (1932) - Officer
- The Iron Stair (1933) - Major Gordon
- The Shadow (1933) - Det. Inspector Carr
- The Private Life of Henry VIII (1933) - Hans Holbein (uncredited)
- Too Many Wives (1933) - (uncredited)
- The Umbrella (1933) - Governor
- The Medicine Man (1933) - Police Inspector
- The Man Outside (1933) - Inspector Jukes
- Puppets of Fate (1933) - Supt. Desabine
- Matinee Idol (1933) - Inspector North
- Ask Beccles (1933) - Inspector Daniels
- The Scotland Yard Mystery (1934) - Angry Director of Insurance Company (uncredited)
- The Black Abbot (1934) - Detective Inspector Lockwood
- The Rise of Catherine the Great (1934) - Rumyantsev (uncredited)
- The Lady Is Willing (1934) - Butler (uncredited)
- Tangled Evidence (1934) - Moore
- It's a Cop (1934) - Inspector Gray
- Passing Shadows (1934) - Inspector Goodall
- Warn London (1934) - Inspector Frayne
- Music Hall (1934) - Collins
- The Girl in the Flat (1934) - Inspector Grice
- Lord Edgware Dies (1934) - Inspector Japp
- What Happened to Harkness? (1934) - Inspector Marlow
- Badger's Green (1934) - Thomas Butler
- The Case for the Crown (1934) - Prof. Lawrence
- The Scarlet Pimpernel (1934) - Jellyband
- Once in a New Moon (1934) - Capt. Crump
- The Lad (1935) - Inspector Martin
- A Real Bloke (1935) - (uncredited)
- Radio Pirates (1935) - Senior Police Officer (uncredited)
- The 39 Steps (1935) - Scottish Police Inspector (uncredited)
- The Night of the Party (1935) - Insp. Ramage
- The Passing of the Third Floor Back (1935) - Major Tomkin
- Line Engaged (1935) - Supt. Harrison
- The Black Mask (1935) - Inspector Murray
- Sexton Blake and the Bearded Doctor (1935) - Inspector Donnell
- Excuse My Glove (1936) - Boxing Promoter (uncredited)
- Soft Lights and Sweet Music (1936) - Gramophone Factory Director (uncredited)
- Music Hath Charms (1936) - Barrister
- Tudor Rose (1936) - Arundel (uncredited)
- The Amazing Quest of Ernest Bliss (1936) - Masters
- Where There's a Will (1936) - Detective Collins
- The Limping Man (1936) - Insp. Potts
- Hearts of Humanity (1936) - Mr. Willis
- Rembrandt (1936) - Minister
- His Lordship (1936) - Stevenson
- Conquest of the Air (1936) - Ferdinand Von Zeppelin
- Shipmates o' Mine (1936) - Captain Roberts
- The Song of the Road (1937) - Bristow
- The Angelus (1937) - (uncredited)
- Make-Up (1937) - Karo
- Silver Blaze (1937) - Inspector Lestrade
- Talking Feet (1937) - Lord Mayor (uncredited)
- Saturday Night Revue (1937) - Minor Role (uncredited)
- Death Croons the Blues (1937)
- It's a Grand Old World (1937) - Auctioneer
- Star of the Circus (1938) - Tenzler
- Stepping Toes (1938) - Representative
- Strange Boarders (1938) - (uncredited)
- The Terror (1938) - Superintendent Hallick
- Night Alone (1938) - Superintendent
- The Gaunt Stranger (1938) - Prison Governor (uncredited)
- Dead Men are Dangerous (1939) - Inspector Roberts
- Spies of the Air (1939) - Sir Andrew Hamilton
- Inspector Hornleigh on Holiday (1939) - Chief Constable
- Return to Yesterday (1940) - Station-master
- Three Silent Men (1940) - Inspector Gill
- Spare a Copper (1940) - Inspector Richards
- Old Mother Riley's Circus (1941) - Cinema Manager
- The Common Touch (1941) - Father at School Cricket Match
- Hard Steel (1942) - Mr. Rowlandson
- The Shipbuilders (1943) - Baird
- Fanny by Gaslight (1944) - Magistrate (uncredited)
- Don't Take It to Heart (1944) - Police Sergeant
- A Place of One's Own (1945) - Sir Roland Jervis
- The Hangman Waits (1947) - Inspector
- So Well Remembered (1947) - Morris
- Daybreak (1948) - Superintendent
- The Man from Yesterday (1949) - Judge
- The Happiest Days of Your Life (1950) - Conrad Matthews (final film role)
