= Can You Hear Me, Mother? =

1935 British film by Leslie Pearce

- Directed by: Leslie Pearce
- Written by: Sandy Powell; Paul Thomson
- Produced by: Geoffrey Rowson; Simon Rowson
- Starring: Sandy Powell; Mary Lawson; Raymond Huntley
- Cinematography: Leslie Rowson
- Production company: New Ideal Films
- Distributed by: Producers Distributing Corporation
- Release date: 2 December 1935
- Running time: 77 minutes
- Country: United Kingdom
- Language: English

Can You Hear Me, Mother? is a 1935 British comedy film directed by Leslie Pearce and starring Sandy Powell, Mary Lawson and Raymond Huntley. It was written by Powell and Paul Thomson, and was produced by Geoffrey and Simon Rowson, who had previously run the Ideal Film Company. It was shot at the Riverside Studios in Hammersmith, London. The film's title was a popular catchphrase of Powell.

== Synopsis ==
A Yorkshire mill worker quits his job and heads for London to try and make his fortune as a comedian on the music hall stage. However, on the train south he discovers an apparently abandoned baby which he has to look after.

== Cast ==
- Sandy Powell as Sandy
- Mary Lawson as Mary Warner
- Paul Thomson as Mike Arnold
- Muriel Aked as mother
- Elsie Irving as Mrs. Wilkinson
- Katie Kay as Lucy
- Norman Pierce as Joe
- Raymond Huntley as Dolan
- Hal Walters as taxi driver
- Henry Victor as father

== Reception ==
The Monthly Film Bulletin wrote: "A human and homely comedy introducing Sandy Powell, the popular radio star, to the screen. The story is slight but adequate. ... Sandy Powell has a delightful sense of comedy and a most engaging grin. The baby (Ann Ibbitson) is an infant Shirley Temple and nearly steals the picture. The film has genuine pathos and unaffected humour. The settings are realistic and in keeping with the story."

Kine Weekly wrote: "Simple, homely, Yorkshire character comedy, written by Sandy Powell, the popular and versatile radio humorist, who makes his initial appearance on the screen. The slender story begins to show signs of breaking down under the strain of excess footage towards the end, for the climax is not engineered with good showmanship, but thanks to the star's sly, ingratiating manner and his ability to build up laughs on sentiment, innocently provided by the captivating antics of Baby Ann Ibbitson, an infant still bearing the marks of the cradle, the major portion of the running time is decorated with acceptable all-round light entertainment."
