= Betty Paul =

British actress and screenwriter (1921–2011)

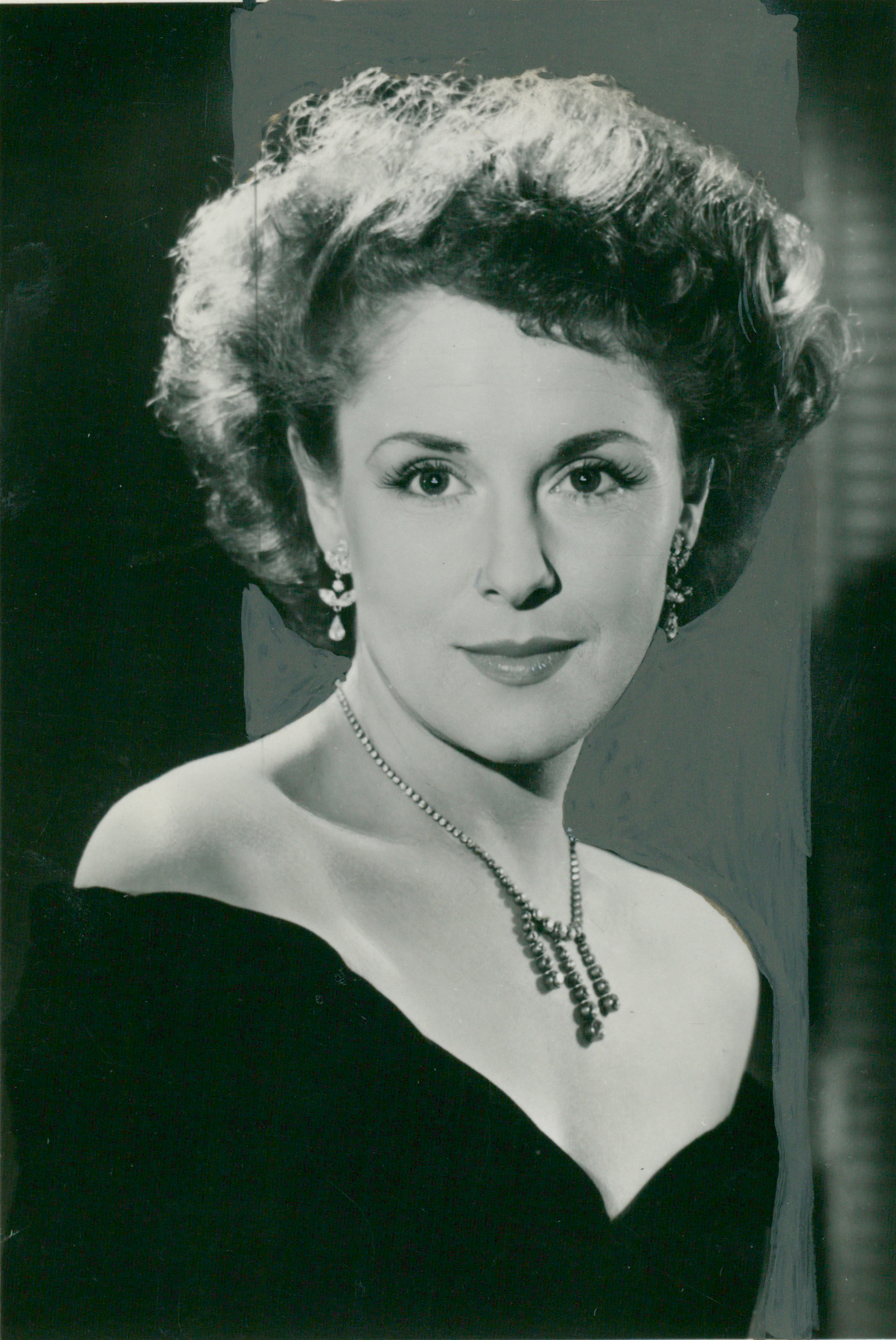
- Paul in a publicity photo for the BBC TV film All for Mary, 1954
- Born: Betty Percheron; 21 May 1921; Hendon, London, England
- Died: 27 February 2011 (aged 89); Tibberton, Gloucestershire, England
- Occupations: Actress, singer, screenwriter, novelist

Betty Paul (21 May 1921 – 27 February 2011) was a British actress, screenwriter, and novelist. She starred in stage plays, including on Broadway.

Paul wrote for television with her husband Peter Lambda. She received a nomination for a New York Critics' Award.

== Early life ==
Paul was born Betty Percheron on 21 May 1921 at Hendon in north-west London. She was the youngest of three children. Her French father was a furnishing fabrics importer and her mother was London Irish. She attended South Hampstead High School and the Institut Francais, later leaving at age 14 to be an actress, singer, and dancer due to the influence of her mother. In 1936, a year after the end of her education, she was in London's West End portraying Adele in Jane Eyre at Queen's Theatre. Two years later, she was the youngest member in C.B. Cochran's Young Ladies troupe.

== Career and personal life ==
During World War II, Paul joined the Entertainments National Service Association, a group that entertained troops. After performing in Lady Behave (1941) and Old Chelsea (1943), she changed her professional name to Betty Paul. She starred alongside the American actor Hartley Power in Lady Behave. Her first husband, Robin Hood (brother of actress Miki Hood) died in 1944. She married Power in 1945 and then later divorced him in 1955. During the early 1940s, Paul was on radio with Vic Oliver, Jimmy Jewel and Ben Warriss. She then acted in Bless the Bride (1947), Bitter Sweet (1949), Into the Blue (1950), The Dish Ran Away (1951), All for Mary (1954) and And So to Bed (1961). The 1953 Broadway play Maggie was her debut in an American stage production. Despite receiving positive reviews, she never appeared in another Broadway musical.

Paul married her third husband, Hungarian-born sculptor Peter Lambda, in 1958 and they wrote for stage and television together. Their productions include creating the first rural soap opera, Weavers Green, as well as The Probation Officer, and Harriet's Back in Town.

In 1979, Paul appeared in Cameron Mackintosh's stage production of My Fair Lady. She moved from London to Tibberton, Gloucestershire, in 1986. Here, Paul continued to write, and around six of her radio plays were broadcast. She wrote the novels Lucky Star in 1989 and Conditions of Love in 1992. Lambda died in 1995. Paul died on 27 February 2011 in Tibberton, Gloucestershire.

== Reception ==
John Chapman, writing for Daily News, said that Paul was "sweet and gifted" and that "few could both act and sing a role as she did". For her role in Maggie, she received a nomination for a New York Critics' Award.

== Filmography ==
Betty Paul film and television acting credits
Year	Title	Role	Notes	Ref.
1948	Oliver Twist	Singer at 'Three Cripples'	Theatrical film	
1950	Let's Have a Murder	Unknown	Theatrical film. Reissued in 1959 as Stick 'Em Up	
1951	Flesh and Blood	Moira	Theatrical film	
1953	Stand by to Shoot	Yvonne Jouvert / Yvonne Jourvert	Television miniseries (6 episodes)	
1954	All for Mary	Mary Millar	Television film	
1955	Colonel March of Scotland Yard	Mrs. Sargent	Episode: "The Headless Hat"	
1956	BBC Sunday-Night Theatre	Suzanne Valdis	Episode: "Bless the Bride"	
1960	No Hiding Place	Widow	1 episode	
1961	Echo Four Two	Mrs. Dukes	Episode: "Frozen Fire"	
