= Hartley Power =

British actor (1894–1966)

- Born: 14 March 1894; New York City, New York, U.S.
- Died: 29 January 1966 (aged 71); Brighton, England
- Years active: 1922–1957
- Spouse(s): Betty Paul (m. 1945–1955; divorced)

Hartley Power (14 March 1894 – 29 January 1966) was an American-born British film and television actor, who made his Broadway debut in Dolly Jordan in 1922. He is best remembered for two roles: "Sylvester Kee" the ventriloquist who is shot and almost killed by "Maxwell Frere" (Michael Redgrave) as a rival for his dummy's "affections" in Dead of Night and Mr. Hennessy, the chief of the news agency that Gregory Peck worked for in Roman Holiday.

Power died in a Brighton nursing home on 29 January 1966, at the age of 71.

== Filmography ==
=== Film ===
Year	Title	Role	Notes
1931	Down River	Lingard	
1933	Leave It to Smith	John Mortimer	
1933	Yes, Mr Brown	Mr Brown	
1933	Friday the Thirteenth	An American Tourist	
1933	Aunt Sally	'Gloves' Clark	Released as Along Came Sally in USA
1934	Road House	Dick D'Arcy	
1934	Evergreen	Treadwell	
1934	The Camels Are Coming	Nicholas	
1936	Jury's Evidence	Edgar Trent	
1936	Living Dangerously	District Attorney	
1936	Where There's a Will	Duke Wilson	
1938	Broadway		TV film
1938	The Return of the Frog	'Chicago Dale' Sandford	
1939	Just like a Woman	Al	
1939	Murder Will Out	Campbell	
1940	A Window in London	Max Preston	Released as Lady in Distress in USA
1940	Return to Yesterday	Regan	
1941	Atlantic Ferry	Samuel 'Sam' Cunard	
1942	Alibi	Gordon	
1945	The Man from Morocco	Colonel Bagley	
1945	The Way to the Stars	Col. Page	Released as Johnny in the Clouds in USA
1945	Dead of Night	Sylvester Kee	
1946	A Girl in a Million	Colonel Sultzman	
1950	Carissima	Joe Erdman	TV film
1952	The Man with the Gun	George Moffat	TV film
1952	The Armchair Detective	Nicco	
1953	The Net	General Adams	Uncredited, released as Project M7 in USA
1953	Roman Holiday	Mr Hennessy	
1954	The Million Pound Note	Lloyd Hastings	Released as Man with a Million in USA
1954	To Dorothy a Son	Cy Daniel	Released as Cash on Delivery in USA
1957	Island in the Sun	Bradshaw	
