= Anona Winn =

Australian actress and broadcaster (1904–1994)

- Born: Anona Edna Wilkins; 5 January 1904; Sydney, Australia
- Died: 2 February 1994 (aged 90); Bournemouth, England
- Occupations: Actress, broadcaster and singer

Anona Winn MBE (born Anona Edna Wilkins, 5 January 1904 – 2 February 1994) was an Australian-born actress, broadcaster and singer, who spent most of her career in the UK.

== Early life and training ==
Born in Sydney, she studied at the Redland College For Girls in Sydney. She then studied piano and eventually opera at the Sydney Conservatorium of Music and Melba Memorial Conservatorium of Music, which the latter was possible due to a scholarship from Dame Nellie Melba. Melba, who convinced her to change her name to Winn, also called her a "human flute" due to her massive range. She became disillusioned with the training, calling it the "strait-jacket of opera training", though she was thankful for Melba's guidance.

== Career ==
She joined a touring company of The Merry Widow, but after finding it hard to be a successful singer, she left and started work as a journalist. After playing parts varying from pantomime to Shakespeare in a repertory company, she moved to England. She played the leading part for eight weeks in the musical, Hit The Deck. Within a few years she had made more than 300 appearances in various radio shows including the BBC's Just a Minute. Winn was a regular in the BBC Radio versions of Twenty Questions and Petticoat Line. She starred in On the Air in 1934.

== Personal life ==
In 1933, she married Frederick Lamport. Winn was made an MBE in 1954. She died in Bournemouth aged 90.
