= Elisabeth Welch =

American singer, actress, and entertainer (1904–2003)

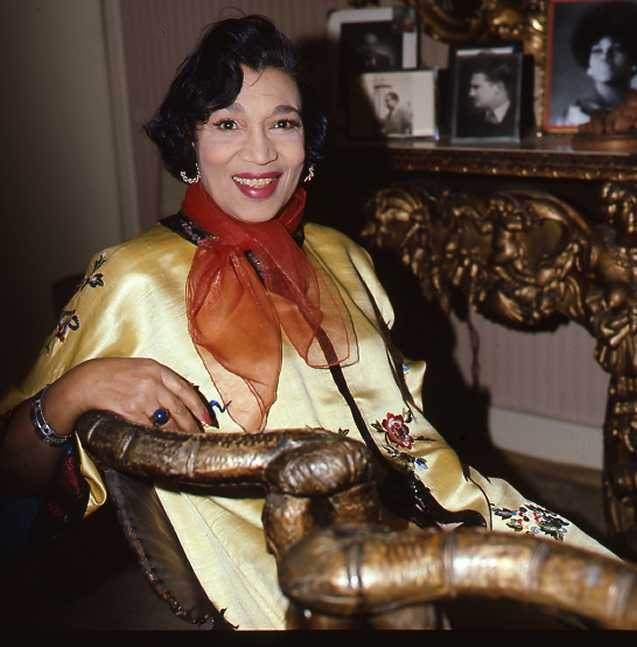
- Welch in 1977
- Born: February 27, 1904; New York City, US
- Died: July 15, 2003 (aged 99); Northwood, London, England
- Occupations: Actress, singer, entertainer
- Years active: 1922–1996
- Spouse: Luke Smith (m. 1928–1936)

Elisabeth Margaret Welch (February 27, 1904 – July 15, 2003) was an American singer, actress, and entertainer, whose career spanned seven decades. Her best-known songs were "Stormy Weather", "Love for Sale" and "Far Away in Shanty Town". She was American-born, but was based in Britain for most of her career.

== Early life ==
According to her birth certificate, Welch was born at 223 West 61st Street in New York City. Her father was chief gardener of an estate in Englewood, New Jersey. Her father was of Indigenous American and African American ancestry; her mother was of Scottish and Irish descent. Welch was brought up in a Baptist-Christian family, and first sang in a church choir.

She first intended to go from high school into social work, but instead chose to become a professional singer. She started her career in New York in 1922, but in 1929 she went to Europe – first to Paris and then to London.

== Professional career ==
After her first appearance in America in Liza in 1922, Welch was the initial singer of the Charleston in the show Runnin' Wild (1923). During the 1920s she appeared in African-American Broadway theatre shows, including The Chocolate Dandies (1924) and Blackbirds of 1928. She made relatively few recordings. Before moving to Europe she made only one record – "Doin' The New Lowdown", b/w 'Digga Digga Do", as vocalist for the Irving Mills-assembled Hotsy Totsy Gang (Brunswick 4014, 27 July 1928).

"Blackbirds of 1928" was taken to the Moulin Rouge in Paris in 1929 and it was here that Welch began her career as a cabaret singer including performances at the popular nightclub Chez Florence.

Welch was asked to return to New York, where she replaced a singer in The New Yorkers (1930–1931) and sang Cole Porter's controversial song "Love for Sale". The composer met her afterwards in Paris, and then invited her to perform his song "Solomon" in Nymph Errant in London in 1933. That year, before this show was available, Welch was given permission to perform in London in Dark Doings, in which she sang "Stormy Weather", newly written by Harold Arlen and Ted Koehler. She subsequently took the song as her signature tune.

Welch's show-stopping performance in Nymph Errant was seen by Ivor Novello, and in 1935, he gave her a part in his show Glamorous Night, in which she stood out again singing his blues song "Far Away in Shanty Town". In 1931, she had included in her cabaret act the new song "As Time Goes By", almost a dozen years before it achieved screen fame in Casablanca. In 1936 she recorded vocals on a number of tracks arranged by Benny Carter, and performed with his orchestra & swing quartet for the recording "When Lights Are Low".

In the mid 1930s, Welch appeared in films – usually as a singer, and as leading lady to Paul Robeson in Song of Freedom and the musical Big Fella – and she was one of the first artists to perform on British television, appearing on the BBC's new television service broadcast from Alexandra Palace.

In World War II she remained in London during the Blitz, and entertained the armed forces as a member of Sir John Gielgud’s company.

After the war she was in many West End theatre shows, including revues. She continued to appear on both television and radio, and until 1990 performed in a series of one-woman shows. She took part in the Royal Variety Performance in 1979 and 1985. In 1979, she was cast as a Goddess by Derek Jarman and sang "Stormy Weather" in his film version of Shakespeare's The Tempest.

In 1980, she returned to New York to appear in Black Broadway and she appeared there again in 1986 when her one-woman show Time to Start Living earned her an Obie Award. At the 40th Annual Tony Awards in 1986, she was nominated for Best Performance by a Featured Actress in a Musical for her performance in Jerome Kern Goes to Hollywood.

Welch was the subject of This Is Your Life in 1985 when she was surprised by Eamonn Andrews outside London's Palace Theatre.

Her final performance was in 1996 on a Channel 4 television documentary called Black Divas, in which at the age of 92 she sang "Stormy Weather". Her final public appearance was in 1997 at a tribute concert for Daily Mail theatre critic Jack Tinker at the London Palladium; she didn’t perform, but her attendance was announced and there followed a standing ovation in her honour.

== Personal life ==
In 1928, she was married to Luke Smith, a jazz musician, but they separated after a few months. They had no children and he died in 1936.

Welch died at the age of 99 at Denville Hall in Northwood, London on July 15, 2003.

== Legacy ==
The Variety Club of Great Britain in 1988 recognised her with a Special Award for services to the entertainment industry.

In February 2012, writer Bonnie Greer unveiled an English Heritage blue plaque at Ovington Court in Kensington, London, where Welch lived from 1933 to 1936.

She was twice a guest on the BBC radio programme Desert Island Discs, on February 26, 1952, and November 18, 1990; her latter appearance is now part of the programme's online archive.

== Theatrical performances ==
- Liza, 1922, on Broadway
- Runnin' Wild, 1923, on Broadway
- The Chocolate Dandies, 1924, on Broadway
- Blackbírds of 1928, 1928, on Broadway
- Blackbirds of 1929, 1929, at the Moulin Rouge, Paris
- Cabaret, 1930, at Chez Florence and Le Boeuf sur le Toit, Paris
- The New Yorkers, 1931, on Broadway
- Dark Doings, 1933, at Leicester Square Theatre, London
- Nymph Errant, 1933, at Adelphi Theatre, London
- Glamorous Night, 1935, at Drury Lane Theatre, London
- Let's Raise the Curtain, 1936, at Victoria Palace Theatre, London
- Its in the Bag, 1937, at Saville Theatre, London
- All the Best, 1938, at the Opera House Theatre, Blackpool
- No Time for Comedy, 1941, at Haymarket Theatre, London
- Sky High, 1942, at Phoenix Theatre, London
- Happy and Glorious, 1944, at London Palladium, London
- Tuppence Coloured, 1947, revue, at Globe Theatre, London
- Oranges and Lemons, 1949, revue, at Globe Theatre, London
- Penny Plain, 1951, revue, at St Martin's Theatre, London
- The Crooked Mile, 1959, at Cambridge Theatre, London
- Cindy Ella, 1962, at Garrick Theatre, London
- Pippin, 1973, at Her Majesty's Theatre, London
- Black Broadway, 1980, at Town Hall, New York
- Jerome Kern Goes to Hollywood, 1986, at Ritz Theatre (now the Walter Kerr Theatre), New York
- Time to Start Living, 1986, at Lucille Lortel Theatre, New York

== Filmography ==
=== Features ===
Year	Title	Role	Notes
1934	Death at Broadcasting House	Herself	
1936	Soft Lights and Sweet Music	Herself	
1936	Song of Freedom	Ruth Zinga	
1937	Calling All Stars	Herself	
1937	Big Fella	Amanda ('Manda')	
1938	Around the Town	Herself	
1939	Over the Moon	Cabaret Singer	
1942	This Was Paris	Cabaret Singer	
1942	Alibi	Cabaret Singer	
1944	Fiddlers Three	Thora	
1945	Dead of Night	Beulah	
1959	Our Man in Havana	Woman in Street	
1963	Cleopatra	Children's Nurse	
1971	Girl Stroke Boy	Mrs. Delaney	
1978	Revenge of the Pink Panther	Mrs. Wu	
1979	Arabian Adventure	Beggarwoman	
1979	The Tempest	A Goddess	Last film appearance
