= Jane Carr (actress, born 1909) =

British actress (1909–1957)

- Born: 1 August 1909; Whitley Bay, Tynemouth, Northumberland, England
- Died: 29 September 1957 (aged 48); Middlesex Hospital, London, England
- Resting place: Mendham, Suffolk
- Other names: Dorothy Henrietta Brunstrom; Rita Brunstrom
- Years active: 1928–1953
- Known for: Stage actress Film actress
- Spouse(s): James Bickley (1931–?); John Donaldson-Hudson (1943–1947); Henry J. Robert Stent (1953–1957)
- Children: Charlotte Donaldson-Hudson

Jane Carr (born Dorothy Henrietta Brunstrom; 1 August 1909 – 29 September 1957) was the stage name of English stage and film actress Rita Brunstrom.

== Biography ==
Born in the Northumberland seaside town of Whitley Bay, Carr attended Harrogate Ladies College. Her first husband was James Bickley, a civil engineer, the eldest son of a farmer and wheelwright, born on 4 October 1896 at Wythall, Warwickshire, to whom she was married on 14 September 1931 at the Register Office, Marylebone, London. According to The Times dated 2 December 1936, Jane was engaged to Major A. J. S. Fetherstonhaugh, D.S.O., M.C., the only son of Colonel and Mrs. Fetherstonhaugh of The Hermitage, Powick, Worcester. However she subsequently married John Donaldson-Hudson, the grandson of Charles Donaldson-Hudson, from Cheswardine Hall, Shropshire on 7 January 1943 at the Registry Office, Westminster.

John Donaldson-Hudson was one of the partners in John Logie Baird Ltd, and Jane Carr's face appeared as one of the first images to be shown as a BBC television image on 15 November 1932, using apparatus designed by John Logie Baird, as was that of Prince Monolulu.

Jane was divorced from John Donaldson-Hudson before September 1947. Jane and John had a daughter, Charlotte Donaldson-Hudson, who relates the details of Noël Coward visiting her mother's flat in London at about the time of the Festival of Britain preparations in 1950. She said:

"Noel Coward was a frequent visitor to our flat in South Audley Street, Mayfair, where my mother, a well known actress at the time, Jane Carr, had two Bluthner grand pianos in our drawing room. Noel wrote the song "Festival of Britain" there, and my mother, who at the time was a pianist and singer at Quaglino's and The Savoy, sang it regularly. It may have been frivolous, but was in my opinion immensely amusing, starting with a stanza I can't quite entirely remember. I only learnt it sitting on his knee 60 years ago!"

Jane Carr's daughter, Charlotte Donaldson-Hudson (born 17 December 1944), the great granddaughter of Charles Donaldson-Hudson talked about Noël Coward writing the song and playing it on the pianos at her mother's flat in a BBC radio broadcast from 4 May 2011, about the festival of Britain. The programme is available at BBC iPlayer: Random Edition.

In Spring 1955 Jane Carr married Henry J. Robert Stent, the managing director of Trust House hotels. Less than two months after her 48th birthday, she died of cancer at London's Middlesex Hospital and is buried in an unmarked grave at Mendham, Suffolk.

Her 1st cousin once removed is Richard Brunstrom, the former Chief Constable of North Wales Constabulary.

== Career ==
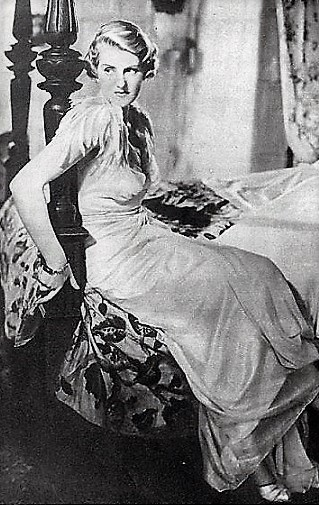
Cropped publicity still of Jane Carr in Millions, published in the 25 July 1936 issue of Picturegoer

Carr began to work in the theatre in 1928, and in September 1932 she joined Harry S. Pepper, Stanley Holloway, Doris Arnold, Joe Morley, and C. Denier Warren to revive the White Coons Concert Party show of the Edwardian era for BBC Radio. She went on to appear in one of the earliest BBC television broadcasts on 15 November 1932 and was cast in a number of films through the 1930s, 1940s and early 1950s. One of her early films, The Triumph of Sherlock Holmes (1935) is available on the Internet.

=== Filmography ===
- Let Me Explain, Dear (1932)
- Love Me, Love My Dog (1932)
- Up for the Derby (1933)
- Orders Is Orders (1933)
- Dick Turpin (1933)
- A Taxi to Paradise (1933)
- Those Were the Days (1934)
- On the Air (1934)
- The Outcast (1934)
- Intermezzo (1934)
- Murder at the Inn (1934)
- Oh No Doctor! (1934)
- The Night Club Queen (1934)
- The Church Mouse (1934)
- Lord Edgware Dies (1934)
- Youthful Folly (1934)
- Keep It Quiet (1934)
- The Lad (1935)
- The Ace of Spades (1935)
- Get Off My Foot (1935)
- Annie, Leave the Room! (1935)
- The Triumph of Sherlock Holmes (1935)
- Night Mail (1935)
- Hello, Sweetheart (1935)
- The Interrupted Honeymoon (1936)
- It's You I Want (1936)
- Millions (1936)
- Little Miss Somebody (1937)
- The Lilac Domino (1937)
- Captain's Orders (1937)
- Melody and Romance (1937)
- The Seventh Survivor (1941)
- Alibi (1942)
- Sabotage at Sea (1942)
- Lady from Lisbon (1942)
- It's Not Cricket (1949)
- A Night with the Stars (1950)
- Stop the Merry-Go-Round (1952)
- Sunday Night Theatre (1 episode, 1952) (TV)
- The Saint's Return (1953)
- 36 Hours (1953) (US:Terror Street)
