= Leave It to Me (1937 film) =

1937 British film by Herbert Smith

- Sandy Powell in the film.
- Directed by: Herbert Smith
- Written by: Fenn Sherrie; Ingram d'Abbes
- Starring: Sandy Powell
- Cinematography: George Stretton
- Production company: Tom Arnold Productions
- Release date: 1937
- Running time: 71 minutes
- Country: United Kingdom
- Language: English

Leave It to Me is a 1937 British comedy film directed by Herbert Smith and starring Sandy Powell. It was written by Fenn Sherrie and Ingram d'Abbes.

== Preservation status ==
The British Film Institute National Archive holds a collection of ephemera and stills but no film or video materials.

== Plot ==
Set in the London district of Limehouse, Sandy enters the Special Constabulary, having been unable to join the Police on medical grounds. In a series of adventures, he rescues a girl from her evil stepfather, sorts out a wrestling match, and then gets involved with a gang of Chinese criminals.

== Cast ==
- Sandy Powell as Sandy
- Iris March as Joan
- Franklin Dyall as Sing
- Garry Marsh as Sergeant
- Davy Burnaby as Sir WIlliam
- Jack Hobbs as special guest
- Dora Hibbert as speciality dancer
- Nicholas Bird as speciality dancer
- George Pencheff as wrestler
- Jack Pye as wrestler

== Reception ==
The Monthly Film Bulletin wrote: " Knockabout farce, starring Sandy Powell as a special constable on duty in Limehouse. The plot is merely a peg on which to hang a series of misadventures which befall the 'hero.' Unfortunately these are no more novel than the gags. They include such old familiar friends as Sandy eating spaghetti with chopsticks, Sandy being robbed of his trousers, and Sandy falling, from a balcony into a water-butt. The supporting players do their best, but cannot make bricks without straw. The pace throughout is slow, and the film both sags and drags. Its appeal will be mainly to the many admirers of the north-country comedian."

Kine Weekly wrote: "Robust comedy extravaganza, built to mass measurements by resourceful and popular radio and music hall comedian, Sandy Powell. The star is not supplied with many original gags, but he knows his job from A to Z, and has no difficulty in turning all that comes his way to humorous account. ... Sandy Powell is seen as a policeman, harem queen, all-in wrestler, professional ballroom dancer, Chinese mandarin, and private sleuth, and in each robust masquerade he finds many opportunities to score laughs. He certainly does his stuff."

Picture Show wrote: "This film revolves round the solidly humorous personality of Sandy Powell, and relates his difficulties in achieving his ambition to become a policeman. He gets mixed up with a gang of Chinese who plan to steal a certain jewel, and manages to save the jewel and get a reward. Competent support and direction."

The Daily Film Renter wrote: "Sandy gives amusing performance in characteristic vein, putting over diverting gags, participating in burlesque all-in wrestling match, masquerading as woman, clowning through adagio dance, and exploiting familiar personality to full. Good robust popular entertainment, with Powell in top form, and laughs all through."
