= Ivan Brandt =

British actor (1903–1972)

- Born: Roy Francis Cook; 8 January 1903; Lambeth London, United Kingdom
- Died: 14 July 1972 (aged 69); Scunthorpe, Lincolnshire, United Kingdom
- Occupation: Actor
- Years active: 1930-1948 (film)

Ivan Brandt (1903–1972) was a British stage and film actor. He was born Roy Francis Cook to Charles Cook and Anna Maria (née Green).

== Filmography ==
Year	Title	Role	Notes
1930	The Middle Watch		
1931	The Speckled Band	Curtis	Uncredited
1932	The First Mrs. Fraser	Murdo Fraser	
1936	Things to Come	Morden Mitani	
1936	Forget Me Not	Hugh Anderson	
1936	The Man Who Could Work Miracles	Player	
1936	Reasonable Doubt	Tony	
1938	Blondes for Danger	Captain Berkeley	
1939	On the Night of the Fire	Wilson	
1939	The Lion Has Wings	Air Officer	
1940	It Happened to One Man	Leonard Drayton	
1942	The Missing Million	Rex Walton	
1943	Old Mother Riley Detective	Inspector Victor Cole	
1948	Under the Frozen Falls	Thompson	(final film role)

== Bibliography ==
- Goble, Alan. The Complete Index to Literary Sources in Film. Walter de Gruyter, 1999.
