= This Was Paris =

- Directed by: John Harlow
- Written by: Edward Dryhurst; Gordon Wellesley; Brock Williams; Basil Woon
- Produced by: Max Milder
- Starring: Ann Dvorak; Ben Lyon; Griffith Jones
- Cinematography: Basil Emmott
- Edited by: Leslie Norman
- Music by: Jack Beaver
- Production company: Warner Bros-First National Productions
- Distributed by: Warner Bros. Pictures
- Release date: 21 March 1942
- Running time: 77 minutes
- Country: United Kingdom
- Language: English
- Budget: £78,621
- Box office: £58,777

This Was Paris is a 1942 British Second World War spy film directed by John Harlow and starring Ann Dvorak, Ben Lyon and Griffith Jones. The film was produced by the British subsidiary of Warner Bros. Pictures and was shot at Teddington Studios in London. The film's sets were designed by the art director Norman G. Arnold.

== Plot ==
British Captain Bill Hamilton meets and is attracted to American fashion designer Ann Morgan in Paris during the Phoney War stage of hostilities. He also makes the acquaintance of Sydney-Chronicle reporter Butch. Later, he is assigned by MI5 to investigate Ann. The fashion house where she works is a center of German fifth columnists, headed by Van Der Stuyl and Madame Florien. MI5 suspects Ann herself is a spy, but Bill is certain she is innocent. Her friend, Count Raul De La Vague, however, has been gulled by Van Der Stuyl and Madame Florien into believing that they are working for Franco-German peace and cooperation against communism. The count is told to donate an ambulance to the French cause. A German spy conceals a message inside the door.

Then the Germans invade France through neutral Luxembourg, the Netherlands and Belgium, bypassing the Maginot Line. Ann is ordered to drive the ambulance to the front line. Unable to convince her that her employers are enemy agents, Bill stows away in the back. The pair are forced to take cover when German bombers appear overhead. A direct hit destroys the vehicle, but a waiting agent finds the message. Bill takes the man prisoner, but he escapes with the message on the way to a French military headquarters. As a result, the Germans are able to capture a vital bridge intact, and tanks pour across it into France.

Bill is given a staff car, but it is later commandeered by French officers, forcing the pair to walk. On the way back to Paris, they find a small, abandoned amusement park. Only the owner, Popinard, is left. He refuses to leave with the couple. He remains behind, holding an antiquated gun. Bill and Ann reach Paris and exchange words with the triumphant Madam Florien before joining the stream of refugees.

== Cast ==
- Ann Dvorak as Ann Morgan
- Ben Lyon as Butch
- Griffith Jones as Captain Bill Hamilton
- Robert Morley as Van Der Stuyl
- Harold Huth as Count Raul De La Vague
- Mary Maguire as Blossom Leroy, Butch's girlfriend
- Vera Bogetti as Mme. Florien
- Harry Welchman as Forsyth, MI5
- Frederick Burtwell as J. B. Entwhisle, Butch's editor
- Marian Spencer as Lady Muriel
- Billy Holland as Liftman
- Miles Malleson as Watson, newspaper librarian
- Bernard Miles as Nazi Propaganda Officer
- Hay Petrie as Popinard
- Harry McElhone as Harry, the bartender
- Jeni Le Gon (uncredited) as cabaret dancer
- Elisabeth Welch (uncredited) as cabaret singer
- Ian Fleming (uncredited) as French officer offering a lift
- John Longden (uncredited) as French officer requisitioning car
- Manning Whiley (uncredited) as French officer shot by German spy
- Robert Sansom (uncredited) as French telegraph operator
- Bruno Barnabe (uncredited) as German spy, disguised as French soldier
