= Forget Me Not (1936 film) =

1936 British musical drama film

- German poster
- Directed by: Zoltan Korda
- Written by: Hugh Gray; Ernst Marischka; Arthur Wimperis
- Produced by: Alberto Giacalone; Alexander Korda
- Starring: Beniamino Gigli; Joan Gardner; Ivan Brandt; Jeanne Stuart
- Cinematography: Hans Schneeberger
- Edited by: Henry Cornelius
- Music by: Mischa Spoliansky; Muir Mathieson
- Production company: London Film Productions
- Distributed by: United Artists
- Release date: 1936
- Running time: 73 minutes
- Countries: United Kingdom; Germany
- Language: English

Forget Me Not is a 1936 British-German musical drama film directed by Zoltan Korda and starring Beniamino Gigli, Joan Gardner and Ivan Brandt. In the United States, it was released under the alternative title Forever Yours. The film was made at Isleworth Studios. It is a remake of a 1935 German film of the same title and one of four remakes of foreign-language films made by London Films. The film was not generally well received by critics, although they praised Gigli's singing.

== Plot ==
While travelling with her employer on an ocean liner, secretary Helen Carleton falls in love with a member of the crew. However, on arriving in New York City, his catty ex-girlfriend convinces Helen that he doesn't really love her. On the rebound, she meets Italian opera singer Enzo Curti and accepts his offer of marriage. A year later, she arrives with Enzo and his young son in London as part of a world tour and meets her former lover, who appeals to her to escape with him.

== Cast ==
- Beniamino Gigli as Enzo Curti
- Joan Gardner as Helen Carleton
- Ivan Brandt as Hugh Anderson
- Jeanne Stuart as Olga Desmond
- Richard Gofe as Benvenuto Curti
- Hugh Wakefield as Mr. Jackson
- Charles Carson as George Arnold
- Allan Jeayes as London theatre manager
- Hay Petrie as New York theatre manager

== Bibliography ==
- Kulik, Karol. Alexander Korda: The Man Who Could Work Miracles. Virgin Books, 1990.
- Low, Rachael. Filmmaking in 1930s Britain. George Allen & Unwin, 1985.
- Wood, Linda. British Films, 1927-1939. British Film Institute, 1986.
