= Tudor Rose (film) =

- Nova Pilbeam and John Mills
- Directed by: Robert Stevenson
- Written by: Miles Malleson (dialogue); Robert Stevenson (screenplay)
- Produced by: Hubert Bath
- Starring: Cedric Hardwicke; Nova Pilbeam
- Cinematography: Mutz Greenbaum
- Edited by: Terence Fisher
- Music by: Hubert Bath (composer); Louis Levy (music director & additional music)
- Production company: Gainsborough Pictures
- Distributed by: Gaumont British
- Release date: 1 September 1936
- Running time: 78 min
- Country: United Kingdom
- Language: English
- Budget: £30,000-£40,000

Tudor Rose (U.S. title: Nine Days a Queen) is a 1936 British film directed by Robert Stevenson and starring Cedric Hardwicke and Nova Pilbeam.

The film is a dramatization of Lady Jane Grey's brief reign as the queen of England. It opens with King Henry VIII on his deathbed stating the order of succession and ends with Jane's beheading. The story deviates from the historical record somewhat, including a fictional Earl of Warwick character who is similar to John Dudley, 1st Duke of Northumberland.

The title refers to the Tudor rose. The story of Lady Jane Grey was also the basis for the film Lady Jane (1986).

== Cast ==
- Cedric Hardwicke as The Earl of Warwick
- Nova Pilbeam as Lady Jane Grey
- John Mills as Lord Guilford Dudley
- Felix Aylmer as Edward Seymour, 1st Duke of Somerset
- Leslie Perrins as Thomas Seymour
- Frank Cellier as King Henry VIII
- Desmond Tester as Edward VI
- Gwen Ffrangcon-Davies as Mary Tudor
- Martita Hunt as Lady Frances Brandon Grey, Lady Jane's mother
- Miles Malleson as Henry Grey, 1st Duke of Suffolk, Lady Jane's father
- Sybil Thorndike as Ellen
- John Laurie as John Knox
- Roy Emerton as Squire
- John Turnbull as Arundell

== Production ==
Robert Stevenson wrote the script while recovering in hospital from an operation. He submitted it to Gaumont British under Michael Balcon. Stevenson worked for the studio several years, writing synopses, and graduating to script writing and assistant producing and directing. He was given chance to direct with Tudor Rose.

The film was one of the earliest production efforts from Ted Black. It was supervised by Black and Sidney Gilliat during the six-month period when Michael Balcon was in Hollywood.

Roy Ward Baker was second assistant director.

== Reception ==
The film was given a gala premiere in London in May 1936.

Writing for The Spectator in 1936, Graham Greene offered a negative review, noting that he had "seldom listened to more inchoate rubbish than in Tudor Rose." Green described Robert Stevenson's direction as "smooth, competent, if rather banal" and criticised the film's historicity, dialogue, writing and scenes. Greene wrote: "There is not a character, not an incident in which history has not been altered for the cheapest of reasons," concluding that the historical-drama genre had reached "the Dark Age of scholarship and civilization."

Variety praised the "marvellous adherance to detail" and "From every angle, it is one of the most interesting pictures ever produced on either side of the ocean. Experienced picture men here think the film will be a huge success in America. Perhaps. But they must not forget that the names in the cast are of relatively; small value in the U. S. and that it will require careful publicity to get moving."

The film was voted the second best British picture of 1936 by readers of Film Weekly magazine, trailing only The Ghost Goes West. Nova Pilbeam won the magazine's Best Acting award, besting Robert Donat for his performance in The Ghost Goes West.

Balcon said he showed the picture to Louis B. Mayer who was so impressed by the quality of the film on its budget he wanted to sign up everyone who worked on it until MGM. However, Balcon says that although Mayer sent a cable, and this was responded to by the filmmakers, Mayer did nothing further.

Nova Pilmbeam later said after she made the film "nothing happened for something like eighteen months. I longed to do something in the theatre but I wasn’t allowed."
