= Get Off My Foot =

- Max Miller and Jane Carr (right) in the film
- Directed by: William Beaudine
- Written by: Frank Launder; Robert Edmunds
- Based on: "Money by Wire" (play) Edward A. Paulton
- Produced by: Irving Asher
- Starring: Max Miller; Chili Bouchier
- Cinematography: Basil Emmott
- Production company: Warner Brothers-First National Productions
- Distributed by: Warner Bros.
- Release date: November 1935
- Running time: 82 minutes
- Country: United Kingdom
- Language: English

Get Off My Foot is a lost 1935 British comedy film directed by William Beaudine and starring Max Miller and Chili Bouchier. It was written by Frank Launder and Robert Edmunds based on the play Money by Wire by Edward A. Paulton. The film was a quota quickie production.

== Preservation status ==
The British Film Institute has classed Get Off My Foot as a lost film. Its National Archive holds a collection of ephemera and stills but no film or video materials.

== Plot ==
A Smithfield Market porter believes he was responsible for his friend's death. He flees to the country and obtains the position of butler with a wealthy family, and falls in love with one of the maids, played by Bouchier.

== Cast ==
- Max Miller as Herbert Cronk
- Chili Bouchier as Marie
- Jane Carr as Helen Rawlingcourt
- Norma Varden as Mrs. Rawlingcourt
- Morland Graham as Mr. Rawlingcourt
- Reginald Purdell as Joe
- Vera Bogetti as Matilda
- Wally Patch as tramp

== Reception ==
The Monthly Film Bulletin wrote: "The few opening Smithfield and waterside scenes are made with an air of some reality and the butlering scenes give Max Miller opportunities for knockabout humour and a few digs at the huntin' and ridin' crowd – not very much is made of his fear of arrest. The situations include a bedroom scene and a farcical hunt. As a whole the film is amusing although the humour is slightly ponderous."

Kine Weekly wrote: "Robust, hilarious comedy, this film deserves to succeed because nothing has been left to chance; all the tried and trusted gags are in and a few good new ones."

Picturegoer wrote: "'All the good old gags and some new ones are incorporated in this robust broad comedy, which is designed to exploit the humour of Max Miller and will doubtless please his numerous following. ... There is rather more polish about this production than in most comedies of its type, but it is the slapstick fooling which gives it its mass appeal. ... Max Miller carries the weight of the entertainment on his shoulders, and at times the load seems to be a bit too heavy; but the irresponsible comedian puts over his own type of material well. The rest of the cast work hard to 'feedf the lead. Action is rapid and, while some situations are hackneyed, the director has made the most of them."

The Daily Film Renter wrote: "Max Miller is the whole show, projecting his familiar music hall personality on to the screen with considerable success. A resourceful fun-maker, he is more than equal to every occasion, including even the violent love-making of the determined Helen, whose onslaughts, however, he rebuffs with hilarious vigour. ... Prominent in the supporting cast are Chili Bouchier, who is extremely good as Marie; Jane Carr, who enters enthusiastically into the spirit of the piece as the designing Helen; Wally Patch, as 2 double-crossing tramp; and Norma Vardon and Morland Graham, who give able studies of the impecunious Rawlincourts."

Picture Show wrote: "Max Miller is practically the whole show in this hearty comedy ... There is plenty of fun, and the supporting cast is adequate, although given few opportunities, There is no flagging in the pace of the picture, and it is deftly directed and well photographed."
