= The Inn on the River =

1962 West German crime film

- DVD cover
- Directed by: Alfred Vohrer
- Written by: Harald G. Petersson; Egon Eis; Gerhard F. Hummel
- Based on: The India-Rubber Men by Edgar Wallace
- Produced by: Horst Wendlandt
- Starring: Joachim Fuchsberger
- Cinematography: Karl Löb
- Edited by: Carl Otto Bartning
- Music by: Martin Böttcher
- Production company: Rialto Film
- Distributed by: Constantin Film
- Release date: 28 September 1962
- Running time: 92 minutes
- Country: West Germany
- Language: German

The Inn on the River (German: Das Gasthaus an der Themse/ The Inn on the Thames) is a 1962 West German crime film directed by Alfred Vohrer and starring Joachim Fuchsberger, Eddi Arent and Klaus Kinski. It is part of a series of films based on the novels of Edgar Wallace, produced in West Germany in the 1950s and 1960s.

== Cast ==
- Joachim Fuchsberger as Inspector Wade
- Brigitte Grothum as Leila Smith
- Elisabeth Flickenschildt as Nelly Oaks
- Klaus Kinski as Gregor Gubanow
- Eddi Arent as Barnaby
- Richard Münch as Dr. Collins
- Jan Hendriks as Roger Lane
- Heinz Engelmann as Mr. Broen
- Siegfried Schürenberg as Sir John
- Hela Gruel as Anna Smith
- Hans Paetsch as Solicitor
- Rudolf Fenner as Big Willy

== Production ==
It was shot at the Wandsbek Studios in Hamburg. The film's sets were designed by the art directors Mathias Matthies and Ellen Schmidt. As with other early entries in the series it was made in black and white.

The script was based on Edgar Wallace's 1929 novel The India-Rubber Men. Cinematography took place at Hamburg from 6 June to 11 July 1962.

== Reception ==
The FSK gave the film a rating of "16 and older" and found it not appropriate for screenings on public holidays.
