= Roy Emerton =

British actor (1892–1944)

- Born: 9 October 1892; Burford, Oxfordshire, England, United Kingdom
- Died: 30 November 1944 (aged 51); Hendon, London, England, United Kingdom
- Other name: Hugh Fitzroy Emerton
- Occupation: Film actor
- Years active: 1931–1944

Roy Emerton (9 October 1892 – 30 November 1944) was a British film actor.

Earlier in his life, he was a sailor, stoker, docker, railway worker, and miner and served in the First World War. He played in a great number of popular London stage plays and shows, including Shakespeare, as well as film work.

== Partial filmography ==
- Shadows (1931) - Captain
- The Sign of Four (1932) - The Tattooed Man
- That Night in London (1932) - Captain Paulson
- The Lash (1934) - Steve
- Java Head (1934) - Broadrick
- Lorna Doone (1934) - Carver Doone
- The Triumph of Sherlock Holmes (1935) - Boss McGinty
- It Happened in Paris (1935) - Gendarme
- Tudor Rose (1936) - Squire (uncredited)
- Pot Luck (1936) - Berkeley
- Everything Is Thunder (1936) - Kostner
- The Great Barrier (1937) - Moody
- Big Fella (1937) - Spike
- Doctor Syn (1937) - Capt. Howard Collyer, R.N.
- The Last Adventurers (1937) - John Arkell
- I, Claudius (1937) - Octavius
- The Drum (1938) - Wafadar
- Convict 99 (1938) - Colonial
- The Gang Show (1938) - Pearson, Theatre Royal Proprietor
- Everything Happens to Me (1938)
- Q Planes (1939) - Viking First Mate (uncredited)
- Home from Home (1939) - Bill Burton
- The Good Old Days (1940) - Grimes
- Busman's Honeymoon (1940) - Noakes
- The Case of the Frightened Lady (1940) - Gilder
- The Thief of Bagdad (1940) - Jailer
- Old Mother Riley's Circus (1941) - Santley, circus owner
- The Young Mr. Pitt (1942) - Dan Mendoza
- The Man in Grey (1943) - Gamekeeper (uncredited)
- The Adventures of Tartu (1943) - Plant Guard / Member of Underground (uncredited)
- Time Flies (1944) - Capt. John Smith
- Welcome, Mr. Washington (1944) - Selby
- Love Story (1944) - Cornish Fisherman
- Henry V (1944) - Lieutenant Bardolph (final film role)
