= The India-Rubber Men =

1929 novel

- First edition
- Author: Edgar Wallace
- Language: English
- Series: Inspector Elk
- Genre: Crime
- Publisher: Hodder & Stoughton
- Publication date: 1929
- Publication place: United Kingdom
- Media type: Print

The India-Rubber Men is a 1929 crime novel by the British writer Edgar Wallace. It was part of a series of books featuring the character Inspector Elk of Scotland Yard.

== Synopsis ==
Police hunt for a gang called the India-Rubber Men, who wear gasmasks and rubber gloves, and carry gas bombs to stave off pursuit.

== Film adaptations ==
In 1938 it was turned into a film The Return of the Frog starring Gordon Harker.

It was loosely adapted into the 1962 West German film The Inn on the River, part of Rialto Film's long-running series of Wallace adaptations.

== Characters ==
- William Elk - A retired inspector who comes out of hiding
- Harry Lime - The retired murderer Known as “The Frog” who faked his death
- Insp. Philo Johnstone - a man who is taking Elk’s place as inspector
- Mr. Wade - the officer patrolling the Mecca
- Leila Smith - the woman who is the target of The Indian Rubber Men
- Ned Acks - The mysterious man Who is trying to sell the Mecca
- Dr. Charles Ionn - A Doctor who Does the autopsy of the victims
- James - Richard Gordon’s Butler and Valet
- Richard Gordon - a friend of William Elk Who comes to solve the case
- Sir John Archibald - The Chief inspector of the police
- H.Kipp - A Spy Who stalks the river
