= Melody and Romance =

- Opening title card
- Directed by: Maurice Elvey
- Written by: Maurice Elvey; Leslie Howard Gordon; L. du Garde Peach
- Produced by: S.W. Smith
- Starring: Hughie Green; Margaret Lockwood; Jane Carr
- Cinematography: George Stretton
- Music by: John Blore Borelli
- Production company: British Lion Films
- Distributed by: British Lion Films (UK)
- Release date: December 1937 (UK)
- Running time: 71 minutes
- Country: United Kingdom
- Language: English

Melody and Romance is a 1937 British musical comedy film directed by Maurice Elvey and starring Hughie Green, Margaret Lockwood and Jane Carr. It was written by Elvey, Leslie Howard Gordon and L. du Garde Peach, and was made at Beaconsfield Studioswith sets designed by Norman G. Arnold. The film features an uncredited appearance by Charles Hawtrey reciting Hamlet's "To be, or not to be."

== Plot summary ==
Musically talented Wapping boy Hughie Hawkins meets Margaret Williams at a BBC audition, and they become friends, to the disapproval of Margaret's elder sister Kay. Hughie rounds up some local children to stage a variety show, and during the dress rehearsal at the Crystal Palace, the building catches fire. Hughie rescues Margaret from the blaze, and Kay gives her blessing to the pair's engagement.

== Main cast ==
- Hughie Green as Hughie Hawkins
- Margaret Lockwood as Margaret Williams
- Alastair Sim as Professor Williams
- Jane Carr as Kay Williams
- Garry Marsh as Warwick Mortimer
- C. Denier Warren as Captain Hawkins
- Julian Vedey as Jacob
- Margaret Scudamore as Mrs Hawkins

== Reception ==
The Monthly Film Bulletin wrote: "Starting with pleasantly impossible light comedy, interrupted by the show, which itself is cut short by rose-lit newsreels of the Crystal Palace fire, this picture certainly cannot be described as well constructed; but the early parts are very smoothly directed and it has considerable humour and enjoys the benefit of good acting."

Kine Weekly wrote: "Musical romantic comedy-melodrama containing in its shrewd story planning a sturdy platform for the amazing versatility of Hughie Green, popular adolescent B.B.C. and music-hall star. Everything that happens – and plenty does – is in the interests of universal appeal, while the rich, palatable feast culminates in rousing spectacle. There is an excellent supporting cast and slick yet intimate direction."

Picture Show wrote: "Unsophisticated, but entertaining story of a young bargee's trials and tribulations in achieving his ambiton to become a musician. Hughie Green and his Gang, well known on the wireless and variety stage, provide excellent entertainment, and there is a splendidly staged thrill at the end – the fire at the Crystal Palace. Smoothly directed."
