= On the Air (film) =

- Theatrical release poster
- Directed by: Herbert Smith
- Written by: Michael Barringer; Samuel Woolf Smith
- Produced by: Herbert Smith
- Starring: Davy Burnaby; Reginald Purdell; Betty Astell
- Cinematography: Alex Bryce
- Production company: British Lion Films
- Distributed by: British Lion
- Release date: 17 January 1934
- Running time: 78 minutes
- Country: United Kingdom
- Language: English

On the Air is a 1934 British musical film directed by Herbert Smith and starring Davy Burnaby, Reginald Purdell and Betty Astell. It was written by Michael Barringer, and Samuel Woolf Smith. It was re-released in 1939.

== Premise ==
A group of holidaying variety and radio entertainers lend their talents to help a village vicar put on a concert.

== Cast ==
- Davy Burnaby as Davy
- Reginald Purdell as Reggie
- Betty Astell as Betty
- Anona Winn as chambermaid
- Max Wall as Boots
- Hugh E. Wright as vicar

As themselves:

- Derek Oldham
- Jane Carr
- Eve Becke
- Edwin Styles
- Mario de Pietro
- Teddy Brown
- Harry Champion
- Roy Fox
- Jimmy Jade
- Clapham and Dwyer
- Scott and Whaley
- Wilson, Keppel and Betty
- The Buddy Bradley Rhythm Girls

== Production ==
The film was made by British Lion at Beaconsfield Studios. It was one of a number of revue films made by the company during the decade. The film's art direction was by Norman G. Arnold.

== Reception ==
The Monthly Film Bulletin wrote: "Overcrowded musical, featuring a host of radio stars. There is a thin thread of plot following Davy and Reginald off on holiday from Broadcasting House... Nobody gets much time to show their real talent, but many will like to see their favourites even for a brief moment."

Kine Weekly wrote: "Variety entertainment, a non-stop revue of well-known music-hall and wireless favourites, held together by a slender but nevertheless adequate story. The individual turns, although familiar to wireless listeners, are really good – for the personal touch is here – and are interchanged with commendable showmanship; the photography, is clear, and the reproduction excellent. ... Splendid novelty attraction for the masses."

Picture Show wrote: "Radio artistes in revue, the only story being their adventures in a concert at a small village. However, a complete and well varied series of radio acts are presented in a most pleasing manner. The photography and recording are excellent."
