= Around the Town =

1938 British film by Herbert Smith

- Vic Oliver, Finlay Currie and Irene Ware in the film.
- Directed by: Herbert Smith
- Written by: Ingram D'Abbes; Fenn Sherie
- Produced by: Herbert Smith
- Starring: Vic Oliver; Irene Ware; Finlay Currie
- Cinematography: George Stretton
- Music by: John Blore Borelli
- Production company: British Lion Film Corporation
- Distributed by: British Lion Film Corporation
- Release date: 1938
- Running time: 68 minutes
- Country: United Kingdom
- Language: English

Around the Town (also known as Song Writers on Parade) is a 1938 British musical comedy film directed by Herbert Smith and starring Vic Oliver, Irene Ware and Finlay Currie. It was written by Ingram D'Abbes and Fenn Sherie, and made as a quota quickie.

== Preservation status ==
The British Film Institute National Archive holds a collection of stills but no film or video materials.

== Synopsis ==
Struggling theatrical agent Ollie shows the American Norma Wyngold around the British songwriting scene.

== Cast ==
- Vic Oliver as Ollie
- Irene Ware as Norma Wyngold
- Finlay Currie as Sam Wyngold
- Jimmy Kennedy as Jimmy
- Michael Carr as Michael
- Leslie Carew as specialty act
- Al Garvet as specialty act
- Bib Garvet as specialty act
- Pat McCormack as specialty act
- Elisabeth Welch as Elisabeth
- Maurice Winnick as specialty act

== Production ==
The film was shot at Beaconsfield Studios outside London and distributed by British Lion Films.

== Reception ==
The Monthly Film Bulletin wrote: "Jimmy Kennedy and Michael Carr, the Tin Pan Alley Trio, Three Hill Billies, the Rhythm Sisters sing, and Terry's Juveniles dance. No attempt is made to put these acts over with any skill, nor to weave out of them a coherent whole. The entertainment value of the revue depends then on the individual turns which are in the main good of their kind, and on Vic Oliver who works extremely hard. He puts over an unending flow of wisecracks, and displays a characteristic mixture of good humour and impudence."

Kine Weekly wrote: "Bright cheery screen musical revue introducing a formidable parade of popular variety, cabaret and radio talent. ... From the word go it is a merry romp, brilliantly compered by Vic Oliver. ... The plot on which the versatile talent hangs is, it must be admitted, somewhat slender, but thanks to the resource and versatility of Vic Oliver in the joint role of pivot and compere, it more than stands up to its responsibility."

Picturegoer wrote: "Vic Oliver comperes this screen revue very effectively and, in spite of the fact that the songs are not always new, it provides good entertainment of its type. The turns featured are introduced by a slight plot, in which Irene Ware and Finlay Currie support Vic Oliver, but in spite of its slightness, it serves well enough and gives some rhyme and reason for the various artistes appearing."

Picture Show wrote: "Whoever thought of writing a screen play round Vic Oliver had a real brainwave, for that original and witty comedian has enough radio fans to make any film in which he appears a sure success. Not that this picture needs any such underpinning. It stands quite stoutly on its own legs. Not a pretentious picture in any way, it is good entertainment all the way through."
