= Night Mail (1935 film) =

- Directed by: Herbert Smith
- Written by: Charles Bennett; Billie Bristow
- Produced by: Herbert Smith
- Starring: Henry Oscar; Hope Davy; C. M. Hallard
- Cinematography: Alex Bryce
- Production company: British Lion Film Corporation
- Distributed by: MGM (UK)
- Release date: May 1935 (UK)
- Running time: 53 minutes
- Country: United Kingdom
- Language: English

Night Mail is a 1935 British thriller film directed by Herbert Smith and starring Henry Oscar, Hope Davy and C. M. Hallard. It was written by Charles Bennett and Billie Bristow.

== Plot ==
On the overnight Aberdeen mail train, demented violinist Mancini attempts to murder judge Sir Jacob March for refusing to grant him a divorce.

== Cast ==
- Henry Oscar as Mancini
- Hope Davy as Wendy March
- C. M. Hallard as Sir Jacob March
- Richard Bird as Billy
- Jane Carr as Lady Angela Savage
- Garry Marsh as Capt. Ronnie Evans
- Edmund Breon as Lord Ticehurst

== Critical reception ==
Kine Weekly wrote: "Development is very slow and laboured and is not helped by the somewhat stilted dialogue. The artistes do not appear to have been directed to the best advantage. Characterisation is sketchy with a comedy element introduced by the gentry's servants. This, too, is weak."

The Daily Film Renter wrote: "Competently acted and straightforwardly presented, with fair suspense values and romantic element. Useful popular supporting feature."

TV Guide rated the film two out of four stars, and wrote, "This thriller is helped along by its quick pacing and unusual assortment of quirky characters. The sort of underhanded conniver portrayed here by Oscar was his specialty.
