= George Stretton =

British cinematographer

- Born: 1901; Cranbrook, Kent; United Kingdom
- Died: 28 April 1955 (aged 53–54); Amersham, Buckinghamshire; United Kingdom
- Other name: George Dudgeon Stretton
- Occupation: Cinematographer

George Stretton (1901–1955) was a British cinematographer.

== Selected filmography ==
- Song of the Plough (1933)
- She Was Only a Village Maiden (1933)
- Lest We Forget (1934)
- Colonel Blood (1934)
- Menace (1934)
- Maria Marten, or The Murder in the Red Barn (1935)
- Lieut. Daring R.N. (1935)
- Rolling Home (1935)
- Emil and the Detectives (1935)
- Honeymoon for Three (1935)
- Prison Breaker (1936)
- Jury's Evidence (1936)
- It's You I Want (1936)
- The Interrupted Honeymoon (1936)
- Big Fella (1937)
- The Live Wire (1937)
- Melody and Romance (1937)
- It's a Grand Old World (1937)
- Fine Feathers (1937)
- Calling All Stars (1937)
- Blondes for Danger (1938)
- Around the Town (1938)
- The Return of the Frog (1938)
- I've Got a Horse (1938)
- The Mind of Mr. Reeder (1939)
- Under the Frozen Falls (1948)
- Poet's Pub (1949)
- Floodtide (1949)
- Prelude to Fame (1950)

== Bibliography ==
- Low, Rachael. History of the British Film: Filmmaking in 1930s Britain. George Allen & Unwin, 1985.
