= Big Fella =

1937 British film by J. Elder Wills

- Directed by: J. Elder Wills
- Written by: Ingram D'Abbes; Fenn Sherie
- Based on: Banjo by Claude McKay
- Produced by: Henry Passmore; J. Elder Wills
- Starring: Paul Robeson; Elisabeth Welch; Roy Emerton; James Hayter
- Cinematography: Cyril Bristow; George Stretton; H.A.R. Thomson
- Edited by: Brereton Porter; Douglas Robertson
- Music by: G. H. Clutsam; Wilhelm Grosz; Eric Ansell; Jack Beaver
- Release date: 8 April 1937
- Running time: 85 minutes
- Country: United Kingdom
- Language: English

Big Fella is a 1937 British musical drama film directed by J. Elder Wills and starring Paul Robeson, Elisabeth Welch and Roy Emerton. It is loosely based on the 1929 novel Banjo by Harlem Renaissance writer Claude McKay.

== Plot ==
Big Fella is set on the docks and streets of Marseille. Paul Robeson stars as a street-wise but honest dockworker who struggles with deep issues of integrity and human values. Elisabeth Welch plays opposite him as a café singer in love with him. Robeson's wife, Eslanda Robeson, appears as the café owner.

== Reception ==
The movie received praise, particularly for the music, featuring Robeson and Welch, and for Robeson's performance.

== Cast ==
- Paul Robeson as Banjo
- Elisabeth Welch as Amanda 'Manda'
- Roy Emerton as Spike
- James Hayter as Chuck
- Lawrence Brown as Corney
- Eldon Gorst as Gerald Oliphant
- Marcelle Rogez as Marietta
- Eric Cowley as Ferdy Oliphant
- Joyce Kennedy as Mrs. Oliphant
- Dino Galvani as Gendarme
- Anthony Holles as Gendarme
- Margaret Rutherford as Nanny
