= The Flying Squad (1940 film) =

- Directed by: Herbert Brenon
- Written by: Edgar Wallace (novel); Doreen Montgomery
- Produced by: Walter C. Mycroft
- Starring: Sebastian Shaw; Phyllis Brooks; Jack Hawkins; Basil Radford
- Cinematography: Claude Friese-Greene; Walter J. Harvey
- Edited by: Monica Kimick; Lionel Tomlinson
- Music by: Marr Mackie
- Production company: Associated British Picture Corporation
- Distributed by: Pathé Pictures International
- Release date: 14 October 1940
- Running time: 64 minutes
- Country: United Kingdom
- Language: English

The Flying Squad, also known as Edgar Wallace's The Flying Squad, is a 1940 British crime film directed by Herbert Brenon and starring Sebastian Shaw, Phyllis Brooks and Jack Hawkins. It was written by Doreen Montgomery based on a 1928 novel by Edgar Wallace, which had been previously filmed under the same title in 1929 (silent) and 1932.

== Plot ==
Officers of the Flying Squad attempt to tackle a drug-smuggling organisation.

== Cast ==
- Sebastian Shaw as Inspector Bradley
- Phyllis Brooks as Ann Perryman
- Jack Hawkins as Mark McGill
- Basil Radford as Sederman
- Ludwig Stössel as Li Yoseph
- Manning Whiley as Ronnie Perryman
- Kathleen Harrison as Mrs. Schifan
- Cyril Smith as Tiser
- Henry Oscar as Sir Edward, Police Commissioner
- Kynaston Reeves as Magistrate
- Allan Jeayes as Johnson

== Critical reception ==
Kine Weekly wrote: "Actionful, if obvious, crime melodrama, adapted from an Edgar Wallace money-spinner. There is not a great deal of suspense in the picture and less surprise, but it, nevertheless, hands out a lively alternation of rough-stuff, comedy, and, in a smaller measure, romance. The acting of the popular featured players is adequate, and so are the preduction qualities."

Picturegoer wrote: "It is concerned with the rounding up of a gang of smugglers by Scotland Yard with the assistance of a girl whose brother has been murdered by the crooks. The identity of the latter is disclosed early in the piece, which robs the plot both of surprises and suspense. However there is no lack of hearty action and Wallace fans should not be disappointed, Sebastian Shaw gives a smooth performance as the man from Scotland Yard, while Phyllis Brooks, imported from Hollywood, is attractive as the heroine. Sound support comes from Basil Radford, Cyril Smith, Kathleen Harrison and Allan Jeayes."

In British Sound Films: The Studio Years 1928–1959 David Quinlan rated the film as "mediocre", writing: "Not very good."

TV Guide wrote, "routine stuff, just as unimaginatively done here as it was in the 1932 film of the same name".
