= Jury's Evidence =

- Trade show advertisement
- Directed by: Ralph Ince
- Written by: Jack Celestin (play); Jack DeLeon (play); Ian Dalrymple
- Produced by: Herbert Smith
- Starring: Hartley Power; Margaret Lockwood; Nora Swinburne
- Cinematography: George Stretton
- Production company: British Lion Film Corporation
- Distributed by: British Lion Film Corporation
- Release date: 7 January 1936
- Running time: 74 minutes
- Country: United Kingdom
- Language: English

Jury's Evidence is a 1936 British crime film directed by Ralph Ince and starring Hartley Power, Margaret Lockwood and Nora Swinburne. It was written by Jack De Leon and Ian Dalrymple adapted from the play by De Leon and Jack Celestin, and was made at Beaconsfield Studios.

== Plot ==
The story is framed as a Court foreman's reconstruction of a crime. Company promoter Edgar Trent, bored with dallying with his secretary, chases her successor. Discovering that she is married, he accidentally kills her.

== Cast ==
- Hartley Power as Edgar Trent
- Margaret Lockwood as Betty Stanton
- Nora Swinburne as Mary Trent
- Sebastian Shaw as Philip
- Jane Millican as Agatha
- Patrick Ludlow as Cyril
- Charles Paton as Crowther
- Eve Gray as Ruby
- Tracy Holmes as John Stanton
- W.E. Holloway as Judge
- Dick Francis as Hodson
- Philip Strange as Geoffrey
- Aubrey Fitzgerald as Murphy
- Kathleen Harrison

== Critical reception ==
The Monthly Film Bulletin wrote: "This is a well-worked out crime film. ... The acting is good, and helps to create and sustain a tense atmosphere. Especially good are Hartley Power as the foreman, Margaret Lockwood as the wife and Eve Gray as the typist; they have a good supporting cast. Photography is good."

The Daily Film Renter wrote: "Development on safe melodramatic lines, and acting sound. Whole subject well directed and containing ingenious climax. Good businesslike piece of work, which should prove satisfactory popular offering."

Picturegoer’s Lionel Collier offered a two-star (good) rating in his review and described the film as "A somewhat novel murder story which, while not always avoiding the obvious, is capably directed by Ralph Ince and has good suspense values." Collier was mostly positive in his comments regarding the cast and wrote, "As the secretary, Margaret Lockwood draws an attractive and polished character, while Hartley Power is sound as the employer. The discarded mistress is well rendered by Eve Grey, and Nora Swinburne plays the role of the employer’s wife with sincerity. Tracy Holmes is weak as the secretary’s husband."

Variety’s reviewer wrote: "Capably produced and directed film representing great care with detail. Its success, or otherwise, will depend entirely upon whether the ordinary filmgoer assimilates the surprise finish, which seems to lack elucidation for the lowbrow. Acting represents a larger representation of histrionic ability than can be found in most plays or pictures. No sensational talent, but all competent."
