= Alibi (1942 film) =

1942 British film by Brian Desmond Hurst

- U.S. poster
- Directed by: Brian Desmond Hurst
- Written by: Roy Carter; Jacques Companéez; Brian Desmond Hurst (shooting script); Herbert Juttke; Lesley Storm (additional dialogue)
- Based on: L'Alibi by Marcel Achard
- Produced by: Josef Somlo; Herbert Smith (associate producer)
- Starring: Margaret Lockwood; Hugh Sinclair; James Mason; Raymond Lovell
- Cinematography: Otto Heller; William McLeod
- Edited by: Alan Jaggs; Charles Saunders (as Supervising Editor)
- Music by: Jack Beaver
- Production companies: Corona Films; Renown Pictures Corporation; Gainsborough Studios
- Distributed by: British Lion Film Corporation (UK)
- Release date: 10 August 1942 (UK)
- Running time: 82 minutes
- Country: United Kingdom
- Language: English

Alibi is a 1942 British mystery film directed by Brian Desmond Hurst and starring Margaret Lockwood, James Mason and Hugh Sinclair. The screenplay was by Herbert Juttke, Roy Carter and Jacques Companeez, adapted from the French novel L'Alibi by Marcel Achard.

== Premise ==
Police hunt for the killer of a nightclub hostess in pre-war Paris.

== Cast ==
- Margaret Lockwood as Helene Ardouin
- Hugh Sinclair as Inspector Calas
- James Mason as Andre Laurent
- Raymond Lovell as Prof. Winkler
- Enid Stamp-Taylor as Dany
- Hartley Power as Gordon
- Jane Carr as Delia
- Edana Romney as Winkler's assistant
- Rodney Ackland as Winker's assistant
- Elisabeth Welch as singer
- Olga Lindo as Mlle. Loureau
- Muriel George as Mme. Bretonnet
- George Merritt as Bourdille
- Judy Gray as Josette
- Philip Leaver as Dodo

== Production ==
It was the first time Lockwood worked with James Mason. She said Mason wanted star billing and was unhappy at being given feature billing. She said the film "was anything but a success" but enjoyed working with him saying he "was a wonderful artist and extremely easy to work with. He was one of the people who helped me to enjoy making that rather bad film and to enjoy getting back into the routine of my work again."

== Critical reception ==
The Monthly Film Bulletin wrote: "Here is a bright film with a bit of everything in it ...The film is well directed, and Margaret Lockwood makes an appealing Helene, with James Mason playing opposite to her. Raymond Lovell is first-class as the sinister Winkler, and Rodney Ackland as his assistant and Principal Villain No. 2, plays up to him well, introducing an element of melodrama. The other members of the cast team up to make the whole a creditable production."

Kine Weekly wrote: "Here we have a melodrama which deals with the psychological as well as physical aspect of crime. The intelligent approach demands a litle co-operation from the audience, but, although its style is less pugilistic than that adopted by its American counterparts, it seldom lessens its grip. Neither does it spare any expense. Its principal planks are its lifelike characterisation, near light relief, suspenseful climax and realistic and colourful impression of pre-war Paris night life. It definitely has a touch of class."

Leslie Halliwell wrote "Interesting but disappointing minor suspenser copied from a sharper French original."

In British Sound Films: The Studio Years 1928–1959 David Quinlan rated the film as "good", writing: "Quite credible remake of French thriller L'Alibi."
