= The Live Wire (1937 film) =

1937 film

- Directed by: Herbert Brenon
- Written by: Stafford Dickens; Leslie Howard Gordon
- Produced by: Herbert Wynne
- Starring: Jean Gillie; Irene Ware; Arthur Wontner
- Cinematography: George Stretton
- Production company: British Lion Film Corporation
- Distributed by: British Lion Film Corporation
- Release date: 1937
- Running time: 69 minutes
- Country: United Kingdom
- Language: English

The Live Wire is a 1937 British comedy film directed by Herbert Brenon and starring Jean Gillie, Irene Ware and Arthur Wontner.

It was made at Beaconsfield Studios.

== Cast ==
- Felix Aylmer as Wilton
- David Burns as Snakey
- Jean Gillie as Sally Barton
- C. M. Hallard as Sir George Dawson
- Kathleen Kelly as Phoebe
- H. F. Maltby as Hodgson
- Bernard Nedell as James Cody
- Hugh Wakefield as Grantham
- Irene Ware as Jane
- Arthur Wontner as Montell
- John Singer as Boy

== Bibliography ==
- Low, Rachael. Filmmaking in 1930s Britain. George Allen & Unwin, 1985.
- Wood, Linda. British Films, 1927-1939. British Film Institute, 1986.
