= Calling All Stars (1937 musical) =

British film by Herbert Smith

- Directed by: Herbert Smith
- Written by: Herbert Smith
- Produced by: Herbert Smith; S.W. Smith
- Starring: Arthur Askey; Evelyn Dall; Max Bacon; Bert Ambrose
- Cinematography: George Stretton
- Edited by: Brereton Porter
- Music by: Carroll Gibbons
- Production company: British Lion Film Corporation
- Distributed by: British Lion Film Corporation
- Release date: March 1937
- Running time: 79 minutes
- Country: United Kingdom
- Language: English

Calling All Stars is a 1937 British musical comedy film directed and written by Herbert Smith and starring Arthur Askey, Evelyn Dall and Max Bacon. The film is a revue, featuring a number of musical acts playing themselves. It was made at Beaconsfield Studios for release as a quota quickie. The film's art direction was by Norman G. Arnold.

== Plot ==
After a set of master discs is dropped and destroyed, the recording artists are gathered together to re-record their contributions.

== Cast ==
- Arthur Askey as waiter
- Bert Ambrose and his ochestra
- Carroll Gibbons and his Savoy Hotel orchestra
- Evelyn Dall
- Max Bacon
- Sam Browne
- Leon Cortez and his Coster Band
- Larry Adler
- Carroll Gibbons
- Arren and Broderick
- Billy Bennett
- Flotsam and Jetsam
- The Nicholas Brothers
- Turner Layton
- The Twelve Aristocrats
- Ethel Revnell
- Gracie West
- Elisabeth Welch
- Buck and Bubbles
- The Whirlwind Skaters
- Eugene Pini and his Orchestra
- Al Craig and His Band
- Three Canadian Bachelors
- Charlotte Arren
- Davy Burnaby as Mr Katz
- Joan Emney as Mrs Bennett
- Leslie Carew as singer, "Eleven More Months"
- Billy "Popeye" Costello
- The Bega Four as acrobatic dancers, "Hungarian'" club
- Doreen Harris as singer with Leon Cortez band

== Reception ==
The Monthly Film Bulletin wrote: "Cutting is rather spasmodic and the continual appearances of Flotsam and Jetsam demanded better material; as it is, they are apt to pall. ... The story is undiscernible, but the stars are the attraction."

Variety wrote: "With but the flimsiest excuse to envelope the aggregation, this production is practically a photographed version of the acts offered by a number of pop stars of vaude and radio ... fans of each particular act will lap it up. With so many of the names natives of the U.S., there's no reason why it shouldn't register there, too. But with the general run of picturegoers the lack of a story will militate against its success."

In British Sound Films: The Studio Years 1928–1959 David Quinlan rated the film as "average", writing: "Spasmodically entertaining review."
