= Flying Squadron =

Flying Squadron may refer to:

- Flying Squadron (1869), a Royal Navy squadron
- Flying Squadron (1870), a Royal Navy squadron including HMS Volage
- Flying Squadron (1896), a British Royal Navy squadron
- Flying Squadron (United States Navy), a U.S. Navy squadron that fought in the Spanish–American War
- Flying Squadron of America, a temperance organization
- Flying Squadron (film), a 1949 Italian adventure film
- Escadron volant ("Flying squadron"), Ladies-in-waiting at Catherine de' Medici's court
- Squadrone Volante ("Flying Squadron"), a 17th-century group of liberal cardinals of the Roman Catholic Church

== See also ==
- Flying Squad, a branch of the Specialist Crime Directorate
