= It's a Grand Old World =

- Directed by: Herbert Smith
- Written by: Ingram D'Abbes; Fenn Sherie; Tom Arnold (story); Sandy Powell
- Produced by: Tom Arnold
- Starring: Sandy Powell; Gina Malo; Cyril Ritchard; Garry Marsh
- Cinematography: George Stretton
- Edited by: Brereton Porter
- Production companies: British Lion; Tom Arnold Productions
- Distributed by: British Lion (UK)
- Release date: January 1937 (UK)
- Running time: 71 minutes
- Country: United Kingdom
- Language: English

It's a Grand Old World is a 1937 British comedy film directed by Herbert Smith and starring Sandy Powell, Gina Malo and Cyril Ritchard. It was written by Ingram D'Abbes, Fenn Sherie and Sandy Powell from a story by Tom Arnold and was made at Beaconsfield Studios. The film's sets were designed by Norman Arnold.

== Synopsis ==
An unemployed man wins the football pools, and decides to buy a country house for his actress girlfriend.

== Cast ==
- Sandy Powell as Sandy
- Gina Malo as Joan
- Cyril Ritchard as Brian
- Frank Pettingell as Bull
- Garry Marsh as stage manager
- Ralph Truman as Banks
- Fewlass Llewellyn as father
- John Turnbull as auctioneer
- Iris Charles as girl in the car

== Reception ==
The Monthly Film Bulletin wrote: "The film is full of disconnected episodes; fewer ideas, and those fully worked out, would have improved the film. Sandy Powell is the only connecting link between. Some of them are funny, e.g the broadcasting studio; and others are dull, e.g the band concert. The photography is slipshod, and the sets occasionally execrable. ... The supporting cast is very good. If you like Sandy Powell, you will probably like the film."

Kine Weekly wrote: "A picture exactly suited to audiences of the North with the popular stage and radio star Sandy Powell in a part which gives him full scope for his particular type of comedy and in which he registers a great success."
