= I've Got a Horse =

- Directed by: Herbert Smith
- Written by: Ingram D'Abbes; Sandy Powell; Fenn Sherie
- Produced by: Herbert Smith
- Starring: Sandy Powell; Norah Howard; Felix Aylmer
- Cinematography: George Stretton
- Edited by: Ray Pitt
- Music by: John Blore Borelli
- Production company: British Lion Film Corporation
- Distributed by: British Lion Film Corporation
- Release date: September 1938
- Running time: 77 minutes
- Country: United Kingdom
- Language: English

I've Got a Horse is a 1938 British comedy film directed by Herbert Smith and starring Sandy Powell, Norah Howard and Felix Aylmer. It was written by Ingram D'Abbes, Powell and Fenn Sherie.

== Plot ==
Sandy accepts a racehorse called Lightning as settlement for a bad debt. When he enters the horse in a race and it starts doing circus tricks and loses the competition, Sandy realises the animal's future and his own lie in the circus.

== Cast ==
- Sandy Powell as Sandy
- Norah Howard as Alice
- Felix Aylmer as Lovatt
- Evelyn Roberts as Thomas
- Leo Franklyn as Joe
- D. A. Clarke-Smith as Fowler, Kings Counsel
- Kathleen Harrison as Mabel
- Edward Chapman as George
- Wilfrid Hyde-White as Police Constable
- Frank Atkinson as Bunker

== Reception ==
The Monthly Film Bulletin wrote: "Those who like Mr. Powell will find this film excruciatingly funny."

Kine Weekly wrote: "Friendly, homespun comedy, neatly fashioned to accommodate the urbane versatility of stage, screen and radio star Sandy Powell. The story has showmanlike comprehensiveness, the star's performance is excellent, many of the gags are great, and the support and staging, are first-rate."

The Daily Film Renter wrote: "Patrons who see Sandy Powell's name outside a theatre know pretty well the sort of show they are going to get, and the comedian's latest Beaconsfield talkie should not disappoint them."
