= Into the Blue (1950 film) =

1950 British comedy film by Herbert Wilcox

- Directed by: Herbert Wilcox
- Written by: Pamela Bower; Nicholas Phipps; Donald Taylor
- Produced by: Herbert Wilcox; Michael Wilding
- Starring: Michael Wilding; Odile Versois; Jack Hulbert
- Cinematography: Mutz Greenbaum
- Edited by: Bill Lewthwaite
- Music by: Mischa Spoliansky
- Production company: Imperadio Films
- Distributed by: British Lion Films
- Release date: 27 December 1950
- Running time: 83 minutes
- Country: United Kingdom
- Language: English

Into the Blue is a 1950 British comedy film directed by Herbert Wilcox and starring Michael Wilding, Odile Versois and Jack Hulbert. It is also known as Man in the Dinghy. In the film, a couple hire a yacht for what they hope will be a relaxing cruise to Norway, but instead become involved with smugglers and end up going up the River Seine to Paris.

It was shot at Isleworth Studios in London. The film's sets were designed by the art director William C. Andrews. Made by Wilcox's independent production company Imperadio, it was distributed by British Lion Films.

== Plot ==
The story opens with Bill, the Skipper, (Edward Rigby), on holiday fishing, as he reminisces about when he once piloted a yacht for a Mr. and Mrs. Fergusson (Jack Hulbert & Constance Cummings). He muses upon how different people all choose their own ideal holiday, (during which re-used scenes with Michael Shepley playing golf, (from an unknown film), and Kathleen Harrison and Jack Warner (actor), both exercising from 1947's Holiday Camp (film)), appear. He remembers that the Fergussons were relaxing on board, and bound for Oslo, Norway; but after leaving England they discovered they had a stowaway, Nicholas, (Michael Wilding), who was on the run from the police. He was asked to take two suitcases to Monte Carlo, but on examination at the airport they contained stolen watches, so he grabbed the cases and ran. All attempts by the couple to remove him from the yacht failed, and they ended up going to Rouen, Paris, and finally Monte Carlo. In the meantime, romance blossomed between Nicholas and Jackie, (Odile Versois), the adopted daughter of the skipper. They eventually planned to marry, but first, Nicholas decided to confront the smugglers, and to turn himself in to the police. Unknown to him, the police had tailed him ever since he left England, and followed him to the hotel, where they overheard him speaking with the head of the smugglers, whom they were trying to capture for years. The smugglers received a prison sentence, but Nicholas, being merely their unwitting pawn, just a caution, so was free to catch up with the yacht, now on its way back to England, and to become his son-in-law.

== Cast ==
- Michael Wilding as Nicholas Foster
- Odile Versois as Jackie
- Jack Hulbert as John Fergusson
- Constance Cummings as Mrs. Kate Fergusson
- Edward Rigby as Bill, the Skipper
- Percy Walsh as Inspector Brilleaux
- Aileen Lewis as Woman in Nightclub
- Betty Paul as Singer
- Michael Shepley as Golfer
- John Gabriel as Nightclub Manager
- Robert Vossler as French Gendarme
- Jacques Cey as French Gendarme

== Critical reception ==
In The New York Times Bosley Crowther wrote, "Let's be truthful about it: Herbert Wilcox has never been renowned for qualities of wit and humor in his eminently proper British films. And his "Man in the Dinghy," which became beached at the Sixtieth Street Trans-Lux yesterday, will do nothing to enhance his reputation in this particularly tough and ticklish line. It is a dismally unfunny fable about the pains to which a man and wife are put by a repulsively debonair fellow who stows away on their vacation yacht"; whereas more recently, TV Guide wrote, "There's nothing new about this film, but it's ample entertainment"; and Allmovie wrote, "Into the Blue is enhanced by the presence of two veteran British movie favorites. Jack Hulbert and Constance Cummings ...the film's real strong suits are its stars and its location photography."
