= Blondes for Danger =

1934 British film by Jack Raymond

- Original trade ad Kinematograph Weekly
- Directed by: Jack Raymond
- Written by: Gerald Elliott
- Based on: the novel Red for Danger by Evadne Price
- Produced by: Herbert Wilcox
- Starring: Gordon Harker; Enid Stamp-Taylor
- Cinematography: George Stretton
- Edited by: Peggy Hennessey
- Music by: John Blore Borelli
- Production company: Herbert Wilcox Productions
- Distributed by: British Lion
- Release date: 1938
- Running time: 68 minutes
- Country: United Kingdom
- Language: English

Blondes for Danger is a 1938 British thriller film directed by Jack Raymond and starring Gordon Harker and Enid Stamp-Taylor. It was written by Gerald Elliot and made at Beaconsfield Studios for release by British Lion. The film's sets were designed by the art director Norman G. Arnold.

== Plot ==
London cabbie Alf Huggins finds himself caught up in the world of espionage and assassination. When a British executive's monopoly of the oil industry is threatened, Alf is set up as the patsy for his attempt on a Middle-Eastern Prince's life.

== Cast ==
- Gordon Harker as Alf Huggins
- Enid Stamp-Taylor as Valerie
- Janet Johnson as Ann Penny
- Ivan Brandt as Captain Berkeley
- Percy Parsons as Quentin Hearns
- Everley Gregg as Hetty Hopper
- Henry Wolston as Doctor
- Charles Eaton as Prince Boris

== Critical reception ==
The Monthly Film Bulletin wrote: "This inconsequent but amusing story is somewhat incoherent at times, and it is difficult to know who is doing what, or why. But who cares, Gordon Harker is at the top of his form, and gives a performance rich in Cockney humour at its best and most characteristic. He is helped by clever dialogue, and puts over wisecracks and telling lines in his inimitable manner. Comedy relief and melodramatic incident are skilfully alternated. The climax is a gorgeous mixture of both, and is highly entertaining. The direction is efficient and workmanlike, and the supporting cast play up admirably to the lead."

The Daily Film Renter wrote: "The various plot ingredients are neatly blended, comedy being nicely alternated with dramatic passages. ... Gordon Harker's Alf is vintage performance his large following should find intensely amusing, the famous lower lip working overtime in the cause of pantomimic abuse, and cockney wisecracks peppering his dialogue in profusion."

Kine Weekly wrote: "Story clarity is not the film's strong suit, but there is always Gordon Harker, and he conquers with his typically cockney humour where the plot fails. It is a day, or rather a night, out for the star and his fans."

TV Guide wrote, "nicely done suspense tale of international intrigue sparked with generous doses of comedy from the witty Harker."

Sky Movies noted, "Comedy-thrillers with droop-lipped cockney character star Gordon Harker were pure gold at the box-office in Britain of the late Thirties," and went on to call the film "a robust romp."
