= It's You I Want =

- Jane Carr, Seymour Hicks and Hugh Wakefield in the film
- Directed by: Ralph Ince
- Written by: Maurice Braddell (play); Cyril Campion
- Produced by: Herbert Smith
- Starring: Seymour Hicks; Marie Lohr; Hugh Wakefield; Jane Carr
- Cinematography: George Stretton
- Production company: British Lion
- Distributed by: British Lion
- Release date: October 1936
- Running time: 73 minutes
- Country: United Kingdom
- Language: English

It's You I Want is a 1936 British comedy film directed by Ralph Ince and starring Seymour Hicks, Marie Lohr and Hugh Wakefield. It was written by Cyril Campion based on the 1935 play by Maurice Braddell and was made at Beaconsfield Studios with sets designed by Norman Arnold.

== Plot ==
Ladies man Victor Delaney rents his luxury apartment to fellow ne'er-do-well Otto Gilbert, who installs Melisande, his latest conquest. Otto's wife Constance arrives on the scene, followed by Melisande's husband, and a catalogue of farcial situations ensue.

== Cast ==
- Seymour Hicks as Victor Delaney
- Marie Lohr as Constance Gilbert
- Hugh Wakefield as Otto Gilbert
- Jane Carr as Melisande
- Lesley Wareing as Anne Vernon
- H.G. Stoker as Braille
- Gerald Barry as Maj. Entwhistle
- Ronald Waters as Jimmy Watts
- Dorothy Hamilton as Lady Maureen

== Reception ==
The Monthly Film Bulletin wrote: "The victims of this comedy are well played by Marie Lohr, Hugh Wakefield, Jane Carr and Leslie Wareing. But Seymour Hicks is seldom off the set, and he understands the art of putting across flimsy material. Some of the jokes should have been roasted long ago. But, thanks to quick dialogue, the audience is kept amused. The production makes no attempt to translate the play into a film. The editing and cutting are haphazard."

Kine Weekly wrote: "Scintillating farcical comedy ... The producer injects plenty of pop into the provocative, piquant story and his excellent work is supplemented by a resourcetul and irrepressible performance on the part of Seymour Hicks. There is never a dull moment, while added to popular humour is the gay spice of sex."

The Daily Film Renter wrote: "Presented on lines of stage-play, action is interpreted mainly by dialogue of risque type, star's skilful skating over thinnest of ice disarming criticism. Played at fast pace and punctuated with innumerable laughs, this is a frothy confection likely to prove very good entertainment for all audiences."

Picture Show wrote: "This adaptation of the successful stage farce retains much of its staginess in film form, but is hilariously funny, even though it offers little that Is new in situations or gags. Seymour Hicks gives a most spirited performance as an elderly philanderer, and receives excellent support from Hugh Wakefield, Marie Lohr, and a hard-working cast."
