= The Return of the Frog =

- Directed by: Maurice Elvey
- Screenplay by: Gerald Elliott; Ian Hay
- Based on: novel The India-Rubber Men by Edgar Wallace
- Produced by: Herbert Smith; Herbert Wilcox
- Starring: Gordon Harker; Hartley Power; Rene Ray
- Cinematography: George Stretton
- Edited by: Peggy Hennessey; Alan Jaggs
- Music by: John Blore Borelli
- Production company: Imperator Films
- Distributed by: British Lion
- Release date: 24 November 1938
- Running time: 73 minutes
- Country: United Kingdom
- Language: English

The Return of the Frog is a 1938 British crime film directed by Maurice Elvey and starring Gordon Harker, Hartley Power and Rene Ray. It is a sequel to the 1937 film The Frog, and was written by Gerald Elliott and Ian Hay based on the 1929 novel The India-Rubber Men by Edgar Wallace. It was shot at Beaconsfield Studios.

== Plot ==
The criminal mastermind "the Frog" gives his orders to his numerous gang through a speaker in a large statue of a frog. The manager of the Southwestern Bank, the target for that night, is dining with a beautiful young lady named Lela Oaks. After the successful robbery, the Frog tells his men that he is planning a big job, one which will enable them all to retire. The Frog questions No. 23's loyalty. To prove himself, No. 23 is told to go to a certain address and murder the person who opens the door. However, it is a trap, and No. 23 is the one who is killed. Another henchman kills a sea captain who claims to know the secret identity of the Frog, as well as a police inspector who is interviewing him. The Frog's mark is stenciled on a bank wall, so Police Inspector Elk, who had previously foiled the Frog, is brought in.

'Chicago Dale' Sandford arrives from America to study Elk's methods; while he is waiting, the office is shot at. Suspicious, Elk tries to contact the Chicago chief of police, who supposedly vouched for Sandford, but the man is murdered before Elk can talk to him. In public, a man who resembles Elk is shot dead, the first of several attempts on Elk's life.

Sandford, who is attracted to Lela, is delighted when Elk takes him along to see Lela's crooked aunt, Mum. Mum's associate, 'Dutchy' Alkmann, hastily departs. Elk finds a ring in Mum's hidden safe, which leads him to a ship, the Seal of Troy. There, he interrupts an argument between Dutchy and another of the Frog's henchmen, Dandy Lane.

Later, Dandy Lane receives written instructions to pick up Lela, who is led to believe he is driving her to meet Sandford. However, when the lecherous Lane tries to take advantage of her, a man shoots him dead.

Meanwhile, Elk persuades Mum to betray the Frog. He pretends to arrest her, but she is poisoned the next morning in her prison cell.

Golly, Mum's henpecked husband, tells Lela that Sandford is the Frog. However, Lela refuses to notify the police, admitting she loves him, so Golly sends a trusting Lela to Sandford's residence, only it is the home of the Frog. Elk, accompanied by Sandford, searches Mum's place and discovers a secret exit, which leads to what appears at first to be a television and a microphone, but turn out to be the means by which the Frog&mdashGolly—communicates with his men. Impersonating the Frog, Elk gets the crooks to repeat the plan of a gold shipment robbery. The Frog finds out and abandons his men, who are all captured. He tries to shoot Elk from the bucket of a crane, but Elk's bumbling underling accidentally opens the bucket, sending the Frog plummeting into the water.

== Cast ==
- Gordon Harker as Inspector Elk
- Hartley Power as "Chicago Dale" Sandford
- Rene Ray as Lela Oaks
- Cyril Smith as Maggs
- Charles Lefeaux as Golly Oaks
- Una O'Connor as Mum Oaks
- Meinhart Maur as 'Dutchy' Alkmann
- George Hayes as Dandy Lane
- Charles Carson as Chief Commissioner
- Aubrey Mallalieu as Banker
- Alexander Field as Sniffy Offer
- Philip Godfrey as Number 39
- Patrick Holt as cadet with question
- David Keir as Number 23
- Norman Pierce as policeman
- George Street as waiter
- Charles Victor as customer in night club

== Critical reception ==
The Monthly Film Bulletin wrote: "Some of the many exciting incidents do not altogether escape the touch of farce; they reach their climax in an exceedingly funny episode in which the Irog is captured in the grab at the top of a crane. Gordon Harker is splendid as the imperturbable Inspector and the improbabilities of the plot do not spoil its many exciting moments."

Kine Weekly wrote: "Death lurks on the river, in a night club, telephone booth, and in a mariner's club, and the wide variety of locale, together with excellent comedy relief and smart dialogue, consolidates the exciting and laughable ilusion. Director Maurice Elvey has cleverly caught the spirit of Edgar Wallace, and he is aided by more than able lieutenants in his attractive and competent cast. The technical presentation and photographic qualities are excellent."

Picturegoer wrote: "Gordon Harker acts true to form in this sequel to Edgar Wallace's The Frog and succeeds in making both comedy and thrills effective. ... As Lila, Rene Ray is spirited and effective, while Meinhardt Maur as the seaman and Una O'Connor as the club proprietress, are both sound. Dialogue is bright and technical qualities help considerably in giving the picture a sense of polish and conviction."

Picture Show wrote: "It is neatly worked out, and has plenty of thrills, interspersed with plenty of quaint comedy from Gordon Harker. The settings are convincing and the supporting cast excellent."

TV Guide noted "an enjoyable mix of comedy and drama," and singled out Gordon Harker as "likable in a role he had filled before in the movies and on stage."

== Bibliography ==
- Low, Rachael. Filmmaking in 1930s Britain. George Allen & Unwin, 1985.
- Wood, Linda. British Films, 1927-1939. British Film Institute, 1986.
