= Home from Home (1939 film) =

- Original trade ad
- Directed by: Herbert Smith
- Written by: Fenn Sherie; Ingram D'Abbes; Sandy Powell (additional comedy sequences)
- Produced by: Herbert Smith
- Starring: Sandy Powell; Rene Ray
- Cinematography: Harry Rose
- Edited by: Jack Harris
- Music by: John Blore Borelli
- Production company: British Lion Film Corporation
- Distributed by: British Lion Film Corporation (UK)
- Release date: April 1939 (UK)
- Running time: 73 minutes
- Country: United Kingdom
- Language: English

Home from Home is a 1939 British comedy drama film directed by Herbert Smith and starring Sandy Powell, Rene Ray and Peter Gawthorne. It was written by Fenn Sherie, Ingram D'Abbes and Powell, and follows a man who struggles to cope with life after being released from prison.

== Plot ==
Sandy is in prison, enjoying an easy life with bed and board provided and a respite from his nagging wife Mabel. But all this ends abruptly when he is found innocent. Soon fed up with the complications of life outside prison, he decides to get himself back inside as soon as possible, and to that end joins a gang of crooks. He is duly convicted, but once again, he is pardoned.

== Cast ==
- Sandy Powell as Sandy
- Rene Ray as Gladys Burton
- Roy Emerton as Bill Burton
- Kathleen Harrison as Mabel
- Bruce Lester as Jim
- Wally Patch as Banks
- Norma Varden as Mrs. Fairweather
- Peter Gawthorne as Governor
- The Five Harmonica Rascals as musical ensemble
- The Gaillard Brothers as musical ensemble

== Reception ==
The Monthly Film Bulletin wrote: "This slight story is the background for a series of Sandy Powell witticisms and humorous situations. The film will appeal chiefly to Sandy Powell's followers."

Kine Weekly wrote: "Broad irresponsible comedy, the theme of which supports the not so crazy proposition that gaol offers the only real freedom from responsibility. ... Its easy philosophy fits the urbane humour of Sandy Powell, and his amiable personality compensates for occasional untidiness of treatment. Supporting teamwork is versatile, and the technical presentation excellent. The spirit of burlesque is never overplayed."

TV Guide rated it two out of five stars, calling it a "Decent farce," and concluding that "Powell is the whole show, supplying an array of laughs."
