= Line Engaged =

- Leslie Perrins and Coral Browne in the film
- Directed by: Bernard Mainwaring
- Screenplay by: Bernard Mainwaring
- Based on: play by Jack Celestin and Jack De Leon
- Produced by: Herbert Smith
- Production company: British Lion Films
- Release date: November 1935
- Running time: 68 minutes
- Country: United Kingdom
- Language: English

Line Engaged is a 1935 British black-and-white thriller film directed by Bernard Mainwaring and starring Bramwell Fletcher, Jane Baxter and Arthur Wontner. It was written by Mainwaring based on the 1934 play by Jack Celestin and Jack De Leon, and was produced by British Lion Film Corporation.

== Plot ==
Eva Rutland, the wife of caddish Gordon, is in love with David Morley, a successful novelist. David's father, a Police Inspector, gives his son a cast iron murder plot. Later, when Gordon is shot, it seems David has fulfilled his father's hypothetical musings.

== Cast ==
- Bramwell Fletcher as David Morley
- Jane Baxter as Eva Rutland
- Arthur Wontner as Inspector Morland
- Mary Clare as Mrs. Gardner
- Leslie Perrins as Gordon Rutland
- George Merritt as Sgt. Thomas
- Kathleen Harrison as maid
- John Turnbull as Supt. Harrison
- Coral Browne as Doreen
- Ronald Shiner as Ryan

== Reception ==
The Daily Film Renter wrote: "Efficiently produced and mounted, and capably acted by full team of familiar players, it is popular entertainment that should give general satisfaction."

The Monthly Film Bulletin wrote: "Unexpected twists and turns in the mystery maintain the interest to the end. There is nothing outstanding in either the direction or the photography. Dialogue takes precedence over action and at times hampers the movement of the story. The acting is competent; Arthur Wontner and Jane Baxter play their parts convincingly."

Kine Weekly wrote: "The opening stages are a trifle pedestrian, but once the 'perfect crime' motif is established the new angle on the intriguing theme is handled with a first-rate sense of the dramatic. The byplay, too, is good, and it is the popular romantic and sentimental side-issues and bright touches of Cockney humour that complete the entertainment and guarantee its popular appeal."

Picturegoer wrote: "Neatly made thriller which, while somewhat over-dialogued, has some neatly turned action, unexpected twists and some pleasingly introduced paternal sentiment. It does not open too well, and takes a little time to get a hold on the interest, but when the perfect crime idea is made clear it develops well and is strongly dramatic. Not quite virile enough for the hero of a picture of this type, Fletcher Bramwell nevertheless does well as Dave Morley."
