= Marry the Girl (1935 film) =

- Directed by: Maclean Rogers
- Written by: Kathleen Butler; Maclean Rogers
- Based on: Marry the Girl by Arthur Miller and George Arthurs
- Produced by: Herbert Smith
- Starring: Sonnie Hale; Winifred Shotter; Judy Kelly
- Production company: British Lion
- Distributed by: British Lion
- Release date: 1935
- Running time: 69 minutes
- Country: United Kingdom
- Language: English

Marry the Girl is a 1935 British comedy film directed by Maclean Rogers and starring Sonnie Hale, Winifred Shotter and Hugh Wakefield. It was written by Kathleen Butler and Rogers based on the 1930 Aldwych farce Marry the Girl by George Arthurs and Arthur Miller.

== Plot ==
Wally Gibbs is sued for breach of promise by his former girlfriend Doris Chattaway. His current fiancée, Jane Elliott, breaks off their engagement. Wally ends up with Doris, and Jane pairs off with Wally's friend Hugh Delafield, who has been the Counsel for the Plaintiff in the lawsuit.

== Cast ==
- Sonnie Hale as Wally Gibbs
- Winifred Shotter as Doris Chattaway
- Hugh Wakefield as Hugh Delafield
- Judy Kelly as Jane Elliott
- C. Denier Warren as Banks
- Kenneth Kove as Cyril Chattaway
- Maidie Hope as Mrs Elliott
- Wally Patch as Bookmaker
- John Deverell as Judge
- Lawrence Anderson as Counsel for the defence

== Production ==
Nine of the twelve Aldwych farces had been adapted for film by 1935, with some of the leading roles played by members of the original stage company. Eight of these films were directed by Tom Walls and one by Jack Raymond. The production companies for the earlier films in the series were British & Dominions Film Corporation and Gaumont British. Marry the Girl, however, was filmed by British Lion Films with none of the original stars, except for Winifred Shotter reprising her stage role. It was made at Beaconsfield Studios with sets designed by Norman G. Arnold.

== Reception ==
The Monthly Film Bulletin wrote: "This screen version of the Aldwych farce is moderately successful. The comedy is a little laboured, and the whole film suffers from too close adherence to the stage play treatment. Somnie Hale plays the 'silly ass' well and is good with his Jeeve-like valet (Denier Warren). Fairly good entertainment. Not a good piece of screenwork."

Kine Weekly wrote: "Spirited, straightforward farcical comedy, adapted from an Aldwych stage success and generously and smartly embellished for screen purposes. The first half is a trifle on the slow side, the gags are rather too leisurely timed, but the second makes ample amends. ... There is a good deal of dialogue, sprinkled with ripe innuendoes, but it is seldom allowed to impede the action."

The Daily Film Renter wrote: "Development follows usual lines of robust humour, with abundance of wisecracks, succession of tangled situations and riotous climax, in which courtroom scene of unusual character brings film to boisterous finale. Hearty acting counteracts leisurely pace of story, and yields downright entertainment in thoroughly reliable popular attraction."
