= The Flying Squad (1929 film) =

1929 film

- Directed by: Arthur Maude
- Written by: Kathleen Hayden
- Based on: The Flying Squad (novel) by Edgar Wallace
- Produced by: S.W. Smith
- Starring: John Longden; Donald Calthrop; Wyndham Standing; Henry Vibart
- Production company: British Lion Film Corporation
- Distributed by: Warner Bros.
- Release date: January 1929
- Running time: 7,572 feet
- Country: United Kingdom
- Language: Silent (English intertitles)

The Flying Squad is a 1929 British silent crime film directed by Arthur Maude and starring John Longden, Donald Calthrop and Wyndham Standing. The film was made at Beaconsfield Studios. It was based on the 1928 novel The Flying Squad by Edgar Wallace, which was later remade with sound in 1932 and 1940.

== Cast ==
- John Longden as Inspector John Bradley
- Donald Calthrop as Sederman
- Wyndham Standing as Mark McGill
- Henry Vibart as Tiser
- Laurence Ireland as Ronnie Perryman
- Dorothy Bartlam as Ann Parryman
- John Nedgnol as Li Joseph
- Eugenie Prescott as Mrs. Schifan
- Carol Reed as Offender
- Bryan Edgar Wallace as Offender
