= Soft Lights and Sweet Music =

- Directed by: Herbert Smith
- Produced by: Herbert Smith
- Starring: Bert Ambrose variety acts
- Cinematography: Harry Rose; Charles Van Enger
- Edited by: Hugh Stewart
- Production company: British Lion
- Distributed by: British Lion
- Release date: 12 February 1936
- Running time: 86 minutes
- Country: United Kingdom
- Language: English

Soft Lights and Sweet Music is a 1936 British musical film directed by Herbert Smith and starring Bert Ambrose and a selection of variety acts. It was made by British Lion at Beaconsfield Studios. The film is a musical revue showcasing a selection of bands and variety acts of the day. It takes its title from Elisabeth Welch's popular BBC radio show, which ran from 1933 to 1935.

The film's art direction was by Norman G. Arnold.

== Cast ==
- Bert Ambrose and his band
- John Turnbull as Gramophone Factory Director
- Evelyn Dall
- Western Brothers
- Harry Tate
- Billy Bennett
- Turner Layton
- Elisabeth Welch
- Max Bacon
- Wilson, Keppel and Betty
- Donald Stewart
- Karina & Company
- The Three Rhythm Brothers
- The Four Flash Devils
- The Four Robinas
- The Five Charladies
- Sandy Powell's Harmonica Band
- Dorothy Astra
- Murial Billah
- Jimmy Fletcher
- Jennie Gregson
- Bob Robinson
- Olga Zeta
- The Hollywood Beauties

== Reception ==
Kine Weekly wrote: "There is no story, but the slickness with which one turn follows the other establishes variety is the spice of the programme. ... the planning of the show is not strikingly original, but the complete programme, headed by Ambrose and his Band, who are in themselves a big draw, is fully representative of popular cabaret and radio talent."

The Daily Film Renter wrote: "Hot pot-pourri of acts by top-line variety and wireless stars, with Ambrose and Orchestra heading bumper bill. ... The whole thing bubbles with high-spirited fun, rhyme and reason being thrown to the four winds in an abandon of infectious good humour. The acts are so uniformly excellent it is difficult to single out any specific turn for special mention."
