= The Interrupted Honeymoon =

- Original British trade ad
- Directed by: Leslie S. Hiscott
- Written by: Michael Barringer (play); Wyndham Brown; Neil Tyfield
- Based on: play Die Vertagte Hochzeitsnacht by: Ernst Bach; Franz Arnold
- Produced by: Herbert Smith
- Starring: Jane Carr; Helen Haye; Jack Hobbs; Claude Hulbert
- Cinematography: George Stretton
- Production company: British Lion
- Distributed by: British Lion (UK)
- Release date: June 1936 (UK)
- Running time: 72 minutes
- Country: United Kingdom
- Language: English

The Interrupted Honeymoon is a 1936 British comedy film directed by Leslie S. Hiscott and starring Jane Carr, Helen Haye and Jack Hobbs. It was written by Michael Barringer, Wyndham Brown and Neil Tyfield based on the 1934 play Die vertagte Hochzeitsnacht (The Postponed Wedding NIght) by Ernest Bach and Franz Arnold.

== Preservation status ==
The BFI National Archive holds a collection of ephemera and stills but no film or video materials.

== Plot ==
A couple returning home from a honeymoon in Paris find that their flat has been taken over by their friends.

== Cast ==
In alphabetical order

- Jane Carr as Greta
- Helen Haye as Aunt Harriet
- Jack Hobbs as George
- David Horne as Colonel Craddock
- Claude Hulbert as Victor
- Martita Hunt as Nora Briggs
- Glennis Lorimer as Edith Hobson
- Wally Patch as police constable
- Francis L. Sullivan as Alphonse
- Hugh Wakefield as Uncle John
- Hal Walters as valet
- Robb Wilton as Henry Briggs

== Critical reception ==
Kine Weekly wrote: "Farcical comedy, a merry marital melange draped with bright gags, and keenly exploited by a first-rate cast of English radio, stage and screen favourites. The complexities of the evergreen plot radiate good fun, and each and every situation registers with riotous accuracy in a happy-go-lucky atmosphere, gaily spiced with sex piquancy."

The Daily Film Renter wrote: "Lively farce comedy detailing hilarious honeymoon misadventures of genially asinine hero, whose romance is halted by intervention of irate police constable, fiery Frenchman, and other obstacles. Put over with quota of 'wrong bedroom' incident, downright slapstick, and irresponsible clowning, the subject is brightly staged and nicely paced, with Hulbert very much at home in characteristic role. Really good entertainment of popular calibre."

TV Guide gave the film three out of five stars, appreciating there were "Some good moments in an extremely lively comedy."

== Bibliography ==
- Low, Rachael. Filmmaking in 1930s Britain. George Allen & Unwin, 1985.
- Wood, Linda. British Films, 1927-1939. British Film Institute, 1986.
