= Fine Feathers (1937 film) =

- Renée Houston and Robb Wilton in the film.
- Directed by: Leslie S. Hiscott
- Written by: Michael Barringer
- Produced by: Herbert Smith
- Starring: Stella Arbenina; Jack Hobbs; Renée Houston; Francis L. Sullivan
- Cinematography: George Stretton
- Music by: John Blore Borelli
- Production company: British Lion
- Distributed by: British Lion
- Release date: 1937
- Running time: 68 minutes
- Country: United Kingdom
- Language: English

Fine Feathers is a 1937 British romantioc comedy musical film directed by Leslie S. Hiscott and starring Stella Arbenina, Jack Hobbs, Renée Houston and Francis L. Sullivan. It was written by Michael Barringer, and made at Beaconsfield Studios.

A woman out on a picnic becomes lost and stumbles across a gang who persuade her to impersonate the mistress of the Crown Prince of Boravia.

== Plot ==
Seeking shelter from a storm, Teenie McPherson stumbles across a mansion, which turns out to be the base for a gang international adventurers. Their leader is Jim Warren, an amiable American representing financiers with oil interests in the country of Boravia. Jim is concerned by the scheming of Madame Barescon, the Crown Prince of Baravia's mistress. He convinces Teenie to impersonate her.

== Cast ==
- Stella Arbenina as Elizabeth
- Jack Hobbs as Felix
- Renée Houston as Teenie McPherson
- Marcelle Rogez as Madame Barescon
- Donald Stewart as Jim Warren
- Francis L. Sullivan as Hugo Steinway
- Henry Victor as Gibbons
- Robb Wilton as Tim McPherson

== Reception ==
Kine Weekly wrote: "Popular romantic comedy with song, turning on piquant and amusing deception. The story is topical in theme, and, more important still, provides the co-stars with ample opportunity to exploit their wide versatility while the song numbers have lilting melody and the staging technical attractiveness. For the full duration of the crisp running time, the entertainment's aim is mass appeal, and it reaches its goal with creditable alacrity."

The Daily Film Renter wrote: "Although a pity something more worth while could not have been devised to exercise the talents of Renee Houston than this somewhat feeble tale, it cannot be denied she throws herself info the proceedings with zest, making her bricks with a modicum of straw."
