= The Flying Squad (1932 film) =

1932 film

- Directed by: F.W. Kraemer
- Produced by: S.W. Smith
- Production company: British Lion Film Corporation
- Distributed by: British Lion Film Corporation
- Release date: 1932
- Running time: 87 minutes
- Country: United Kingdom
- Language: English

The Flying Squad is a 1932 British crime film directed by F.W. Kraemer and starring Harold Huth, Carol Goodner, Henry Wilcoxon and Edward Chapman. It was based on a 1928 novel by Edgar Wallace, which was also filmed in 1929 and 1940. The screenplay was written by Bryan Edgar Wallace, based on his father's novel. The officers of the Flying Squad attempt to track down a drug-smuggling gang.

== Cast ==
- Harold Huth as Mark McGill
- Carol Goodner as Ann Perryman
- Edward Chapman as Sedeman
- Campbell Gullan as Tiser
- Henry Wilcoxon as Inspector Bradley
- Abraham Sofaer as Li Yoseph
- Joe Cunningham as Simmonds
