= List of British films of 1933 =

British films released in 1933

A list of British films released in 1933.

== A-K ==
Title	Director	Cast	Genre	Notes
1933
This Acting Business	John Daumery	Hugh Williams, Wendy Barrie, Donald Calthrop	Comedy	
Adventures of Don Quixote	G. W. Pabst	Feodor Chaliapin, George Robey, Oscar Asche	Adventure	Co-production with France
Anne One Hundred	Henry Edwards	Betty Stockfeld, Gyles Isham, Dennis Wyndham	Romantic drama	
As Good as New	Graham Cutts	Toni Edgar-Bruce, Sunday Wilshin, Winna Winifried	Drama	
Ask Beccles	Redd Davis	Garry Marsh, Lilian Oldland, Allan Jeayes	Comedy thriller	
Aunt Sally	Tim Whelan	Cicely Courtneidge, Sam Hardy, Hartley Power	Musical comedy	
The Bermondsey Kid	Ralph Dawson	Esmond Knight, Eve Gray, Ellis Irving	Drama	
Bitter Sweet	Herbert Wilcox	Anna Neagle, Fernand Gravey, Miles Mander	Musical	
The Blarney Stone	Tom Walls	Tom Walls, Robert Douglas, Anne Grey	Comedy drama	
Born Lucky	Michael Powell	René Ray, John Longden, Talbot O'Farrell	Musical comedy	
Britannia of Billingsgate	Sinclair Hill	Violet Loraine, Gordon Harker, John Mills	Musical comedy	
Call Me Mame	John Daumery	Ethel Irving, Dorothy Bartlam, Julian Royce	Comedy	
Called Back	Reginald Denham	Franklin Dyall, Lester Matthews, Dorothy Boyd	Crime	
Cash	Zoltan Korda	Edmund Gwenn, Robert Donat, Wendy Barrie	Comedy	
Channel Crossing	Milton Rosmer	Matheson Lang, Constance Cummings, Nigel Bruce	Crime	
Chelsea Life	Sidney Morgan	Louis Hayward, Anna Lee, Gordon McLeod	Drama	
Cleaning Up	Leslie S. Hiscott	Davy Burnaby, Betty Astell, Barbara Gott	Comedy	
Commissionaire	Edward Dryhurst	Sam Livesey, Barry Livesey, Julie Suedo	Crime	
The Constant Nymph	Basil Dean	Victoria Hopper, Brian Aherne, Leonora Corbett	Drama	
Counsel's Opinion	Allan Dwan	Henry Kendall, Binnie Barnes, Lawrence Grossmith	Romantic comedy	
The Crime at Blossoms	Maclean Rogers	Hugh Wakefield, Joyce Bland, Ivor Barnard	Crime	
Crime on the Hill	Bernard Vorhaus	Sally Blane, Nigel Playfair, Judy Kelly	Mystery	
A Cuckoo in the Nest	Tom Walls	Ralph Lynn, Yvonne Arnaud, Robertson Hare	Comedy	
Daughters of Today	F.W. Kraemer	George Barraud, Betty Amann, Marguerite Allan	Drama	
Dick Turpin	Victor Hanbury, John Stafford	Victor McLaglen, Jane Carr, Frank Vosper	Historical/drama	
Discord	Henry Edwards	Owen Nares, Benita Hume, Harold Huth	Drama	
Doss House	John Baxter	Frank Cellier, Arnold Bell. Mark Daly	Drama	
Double Wedding	Frank Richardson	Joan Marion, Jack Hobbs. Viola Keats	Comedy	
Enemy of the Police	George King	John Stuart, Viola Keats, Margaret Yarde	Comedy	
Excess Baggage	Redd Davis	Claud Allister, Frank Pettingell, Rene Ray	Comedy	
Eyes of Fate	Ivar Campbell	Allan Jeayes, Valerie Hobson, Terence De Marney	Sports	
Facing the Music	Harry Hughes	Stanley Lupino, Nancy Burne, Lester Matthews	Comedy	
Falling for You	Jack Hulbert, Robert Stevenson	Jack Hulbert, Cicely Courtneidge, Tamara Desni	Comedy	
The Fear Ship	J. Steven Edwards	Cyril McLaglen, Dorothy Bartlam, Edmund Willard	Drama	
The Flaw	Norman Walker	Henry Kendall, Eric Maturin, Eve Gray	Thriller	
Follow the Lady	Adrian Brunel	Marguerite Allan, William Hartnell, D.A. Clarke-Smith	Comedy	
For Love of You	Carmine Gallone	Arthur Riscoe, Naunton Wayne, Diana Napier	Musical	
Forging Ahead	Norman Walker	Margot Grahame, Garry Marsh, Anthony Holles	Comedy	
The Fortunate Fool	Norman Walker	Hugh Wakefield, Joan Wyndham, Jack Raine	Comedy	
Friday the Thirteenth	Victor Saville	Jessie Matthews, Sonnie Hale, Ralph Richardson	Drama	
General John Regan	Henry Edwards	Henry Edwards, Chrissie White, Ben Welden	Comedy	
The Ghost Camera	Bernard Vorhaus	Henry Kendall, Ida Lupino, John Mills	Mystery	
The Ghoul	T. Hayes Hunter	Boris Karloff, Cedric Hardwicke, Dorothy Hyson	Horror	
The Girl from Maxim's	Alexander Korda	Leslie Henson, Frances Day, Stanley Holloway	Musical comedy	French-language version of French version also produced
Going Gay	Carmine Gallone	Arthur Riscoe, Naunton Wayne, Magda Schneider	Musical	
Going Straight	John Rawlins	Moira Lynd, Helen Ferrers, Joan Marion	Comedy	
The Golden Cage	Ivar Campbell	Anne Grey, Anthony Kimmins, Frank Cellier	Drama	
The Good Companions	Victor Saville	Jessie Matthews, Edmund Gwenn, John Gielgud	Musical	
Great Stuff	Leslie S. Hiscott	Henry Kendall, Betty Astell, Alfred Wellesley	Comedy	
Happy	Frederic Zelnik	Stanley Lupino, Will Fyffe, Dorothy Hyson	Comedy	
Hawleys of High Street	Thomas Bentley	Leslie Fuller, Judy Kelly, Francis Lister	Drama	
Head of the Family	John Daumery	Irene Vanbrugh, John Stuart, Pat Paterson	Drama	
Heads We Go	Monty Banks	Constance Cummings, Frank Lawton, Binnie Barnes	Comedy	
Her Imaginary Lover	George King	Laura La Plante, Percy Marmont, Olive Blakeney	Comedy	
High Finance	George King	Gibb McLaughlin, Ida Lupino, Abraham Sofaer	Drama	
His Grace Gives Notice	Leslie S. Hiscott	Arthur Margetson, Viola Keats, Victor Stanley	Comedy	
Home, Sweet Home	George A. Cooper	John Stuart, Marie Ney, Richard Cooper	Drama	
The House of Trent	Norman Walker	Anne Grey, John Stuart, Wendy Barrie	Drama	
Hundred to One	Walter West	Arthur Sinclair, Dodo Watts, Derek Williams	Comedy	
I Adore You	George King	Margot Grahame, Harold French, Clifford Heatherley	Musical comedy	
I Lived with You	Maurice Elvey	Ivor Novello, Ursula Jeans, Ida Lupino	Romantic comedy	
I Was a Spy	Victor Saville	Madeleine Carroll, Conrad Veidt, Herbert Marshall	Thriller	
I'll Stick to You	Leslie Hiscott	Jay Laurier, Betty Astell, Louis Hayward	Comedy	
I'm an Explosive	Adrian Brunel	William Hartnell, Gladys Jennings, Eliot Makeham	Comedy	
The Iron Stair	Leslie S. Hiscott	Henry Kendall, Dorothy Boyd, Steffi Duna	Crime	
It's a Boy	Tim Whelan	Leslie Henson, Albert Burdon, Edward Everett Horton	Comedy	
It's a King	Jack Raymond	Sydney Howard, Joan Maude, Cecil Humphreys	Comedy	
The Jewel	Reginald Denham	Hugh Williams, Frances Drake, Jack Hawkins	Crime	
Just My Luck	Jack Raymond	Ralph Lynn, Winifred Shotter, Robertson Hare	Comedy	
Keep It Quiet	Leslie S. Hiscott	Jane Carr, Frank Pettingell Davy Burnaby	Crime	
King of the Ritz	Carmine Gallone, Herbert Smith	Stanley Lupino, Betty Stockfeld, Gina Malo	Musical	
The King's Cup	Herbert Wilcox, Alan Cobham	Chili Bouchier, William Kendall, Rene Ray	Drama	

== L-Z ==
Title	Director	Cast	Genre	Notes
The Laughter of Fools	Adrian Brunel	Derrick De Marney, Helen Ferrers, Pat Paterson	Drama	
Leave It to Me	Monty Banks	Gene Gerrard, Olive Borden, Molly Lamont	Comedy	
Leave It to Smith	Tom Walls	Tom Walls, Carol Goodner, Anne Grey	Comedy	
Letting in the Sunshine	Lupino Lane	Albert Burdon, Renee Gadd, Molly Lamont	Comedy	
The Little Damozel	Herbert Wilcox	Anna Neagle, James Rennie, Benita Hume	Romance	
Little Fella	William C. McGann	Marie Ault, Glyn James, Joan Marion	Comedy	
Little Miss Nobody	John Daumery	Sebastian Shaw, Betty Huntley-Wright, Ben Field	Comedy	
Lord of the Manor	Henry Edwards	Betty Stockfeld, Henry Wilcoxon, Frederick Kerr	Comedy	
The Lost Chord	Maurice Elvey	John Stuart, Elizabeth Allan, Anne Grey	Drama	
The Love Nest	Thomas Bentley	Gene Gerrard, Camilla Horn, Nancy Burne	Comedy	
The Love Wager	A. Cyran	Pat Paterson, Frank Stanmore, Wallace Douglas	Comedy	
Love's Old Sweet Song	H. Manning Haynes	John Stuart, Joan Wyndham, Julie Suedo	Romance	
Loyalties	Basil Dean	Basil Rathbone, Heather Thatcher, Miles Mander	Drama	
Lucky Blaze	Widgey R. Newman	William Freshman, Moore Marriott, Ian Wilson	Sports	
The Lucky Number	Anthony Asquith	Clifford Mollison, Gordon Harker, Joan Wyndham	Comedy	
The Lure	Arthur Maude	Anne Grey, Cyril Raymond, William Hartnell	Crime	
Maid Happy	Mansfield Markham	Charlotte Ander, Johannes Riemann, Dennis Hoey	Musical	
The Man from Toronto	Sinclair Hill	Jessie Matthews, Ian Hunter, Frederick Kerr	Romance	
The Man Outside	George A. Cooper	Henry Kendall, Louis Hayward, Joan Gardner	Crime	
Mannequin	George A. Cooper	Harold French, Judy Kelly, Diana Beaumont	Drama	
Marooned	Leslie S. Hiscott	Edmund Gwenn, Viola Lyel, Hal Walters	Drama	
Matinee Idol	George King	Camilla Horn, Miles Mander, Marguerite Allan	Crime	
Mayfair Girl	George King	Sally Blane, John Stuart, Glen Alyn	Crime	
The Medicine Man	Redd Davis	Claud Allister, Frank Pettingell, Pat Paterson	Comedy	
Meet My Sister	Jean Daumery	Clifford Mollison, Constance Shotter, Enid Stamp-Taylor	Comedy	
The Melody-Maker	Leslie S. Hiscott	Lester Matthews, Joan Marion, Evelyn Roberts	Musical comedy	
Mixed Doubles	Sidney Morgan	Jeanne de Casalis, Frederick Lloyd, Cyril Raymond	Comedy	
Money for Speed	Bernard Vorhaus	John Loder, Ida Lupino, Cyril McLaglen	Drama	
Mr. Quincy of Monte Carlo	John Daumery	John Stuart, Rosemary Ames, George Merritt	Comedy	
Mrs. Dane's Defence	A. V. Bramble	Joan Barry, Basil Gill, Ben Field	Drama	
My Lucky Star	Louis Blattner, John Harlow	Florence Desmond, Oscar Asche, Charlie Naughton	Comedy	
Naughty Cinderella	John Daumery	John Stuart, Betty Huntley-Wright, Marie Wright	Comedy	
Night of the Garter	Jack Raymond	Sydney Howard, Winifred Shotter, Elsie Randolph	Comedy	
No Funny Business	Victor Hanbury	Laurence Olivier, Gertrude Lawrence, Jill Esmond	Comedy	
On Secret Service	Arthur B. Woods	Karl Ludwig Diehl, Greta Nissen, Lester Matthews	Thriller	
On Thin Ice	Bernard Vorhaus	Ursula Jeans, Dorothy Bartlam, Cameron Carr	Crime	
One Precious Year	Henry Edwards	Basil Rathbone, Anne Grey, Owen Nares	Drama	
The Only Girl	Friedrich Hollaender	Lilian Harvey, Charles Boyer, Mady Christians	Musical	Co-production with Germany
Orders Is Orders	Walter Forde	Charlotte Greenwood, James Gleason, Ian Hunter	Comedy	
Out of the Past	Leslie S. Hiscott	Lester Matthews, Joan Marion, Jack Raine	Crime	
Paris Plane	John Paddy Carstairs	John Loder, Molly Lamont, Julie Suedo	Crime	
Perfect Understanding	Cyril Gardner	Gloria Swanson, Laurence Olivier, Nigel Playfair	Romance	
The Pointing Finger	George Pearson	John Stuart, Viola Keats, Leslie Perrins	Drama	
The Poisoned Diamond	W. P. Kellino	Lester Matthews, Anne Grey, Patric Knowles	Drama	
The Pride of the Force	Norman Lee	Patrick Aherne, Leslie Fuller, Alf Goddard	Comedy	
Prince of Arcadia	Hanns Schwarz	Carl Brisson, Margot Grahame, Ida Lupino	Musical	
The Private Life of Henry VIII	Alexander Korda	Charles Laughton, Robert Donat, Merle Oberon, Elsa Lanchester	Historical	Academy Award for Best Actor (Laughton)
Puppets of Fate	George A. Cooper	Godfrey Tearle, Isla Bevan, Russell Thorndike	Crime	
Purse Strings	Henry Edwards	Chili Bouchier, Gyles Isham, Allan Jeayes	Drama	
Radio Parade	Richard Beville, Archie de Bear	Jeanne de Casalis, Claude Hulbert, Florence Desmond	Musical	
Red Wagon	Paul L. Stein	Charles Bickford, Greta Nissen, Anthony Bushell	Drama	
The Return of Raffles	Mansfield Markham	George Barraud, Camilla Horn, Claud Allister	Crime	
The Roof	George A. Cooper	Leslie Perrins, Judy Gunn, Russell Thorndike	Crime	
A Royal Demand	Gustav A. Mindzenti	Cyril McLaglen, Marjorie Hume, Fred Rains	Historical	
The Shadow	George A. Cooper	Henry Kendall, Elizabeth Allan, Jeanne Stuart	Mystery	
She Was Only a Village Maiden	Arthur Maude	Anne Grey, Lester Matthews, Carl Harbord	Comedy	
A Shot in the Dark	George Pearson	Dorothy Boyd, Jack Hawkins, O. B. Clarence	Mystery	
Side Streets	Ivar Campbell	Diana Beaumont, Harry Terry, Gunner Moir	Drama	
The Silver Spoon	George King	Ian Hunter, Garry Marsh, Binnie Barnes	Comedy	
Sleeping Car	Anatole Litvak	Madeleine Carroll, Ivor Novello, Kay Hammond	Comedy	
Smithy	George King	Edmund Gwenn, Peggy Novak, Eve Gray	Comedy	
Soldiers of the King	Maurice Elvey	Cicely Courtneidge, Edward Everett Horton, Dorothy Hyson	Comedy	
Song of the Plough	John Baxter	Stewart Rome, Allan Jeayes, Rosalinde Fuller	Drama	
The Song You Gave Me	Paul L. Stein	Bebe Daniels, Victor Varconi, Claude Hulbert	Musical	
A Southern Maid	Harry Hughes	Bebe Daniels, Clifford Mollison, Hal Gordon	Musical	
The Stickpin	Leslie S. Hiscott	Henry Kendall, Betty Astell, Francis L. Sullivan	Crime	
The Stolen Necklace	Leslie S. Hiscott	Lester Matthews, Joan Marion, Mickey Brantford	Crime	
Strange Evidence	Robert Milton	Leslie Banks, Carol Goodner, George Curzon	Crime	
Strike It Rich	Leslie S. Hiscott	Betty Astell, Davy Burnaby, Gina Malo	Comedy	
Summer Lightning	Maclean Rogers	Ralph Lynn, Winifred Shotter, Dorothy Bouchier	Comedy	
That's a Good Girl	Jack Buchanan	Jack Buchanan, Elsie Randolph, Dorothy Hyson	Musical	
That's My Wife	Leslie S. Hiscott	Claud Allister, Frank Pettingell, Betty Astell	Comedy	
Their Night Out	Harry Hughes	Claude Hulbert, Renee Houston, Binnie Barnes	Comedy	
The Thirteenth Candle	John Daumery	Isobel Elsom, Arthur Maude, Louis Hayward	Thriller	
This Acting Business	John Daumery	Hugh Williams, Wendy Barrie, Donald Calthrop	Comedy	
This Is the Life	Albert de Courville	Gordon Harker, Binnie Hale, Ray Milland	Comedy	
This Week of Grace	Maurice Elvey	Gracie Fields, Henry Kendall, John Stuart	Comedy	
Three Men in a Boat	Graham Cutts	William Austin, Edmund Breon, Billy Milton	Comedy	
Timbuctoo	Walter Summers, Arthur B. Woods	Henry Kendall, Margot Grahame, Emily Fitzroy	Comedy	
To Brighton with Gladys	George King	Constance Shotter, Kate Cutler, Sunday Wilshin	Comedy	
Too Many Wives	Frank Richardson	Jack Hobbs, Alf Goddard, Nora Swinburne	Comedy	
Trouble	Maclean Rogers	Sydney Howard, George Curzon, Muriel Aked	Comedy	
Turkey Time	Tom Walls	Tom Walls, Ralph Lynn, Dorothy Hyson	Comedy	
Two Wives for Henry	Adrian Brunel	Garry Marsh, Dorothy Boyd, Jack Raine	Comedy	
The Umbrella	Redd Davis	Kay Hammond, Harold French, Victor Stanley	Comedy	
Up for the Derby	Maclean Rogers	Sydney Howard, Dorothy Bartlam, Mark Daly	Comedy	
Up to the Neck	Jack Raymond	Ralph Lynn, Winifred Shotter, Reginald Purdell	Comedy	
The Veteran of Waterloo	A. V. Bramble	Jerrold Robertshaw, Roger Livesey, Joan Kemp-Welch	Drama	
Waltz Time	Wilhelm Thiele	Evelyn Laye, Fritz Schulz, Gina Malo	Musical	
The Wandering Jew	Maurice Elvey	Conrad Veidt, Marie Ney, Anne Grey	Drama	
The Wishbone	Arthur Maude	Nellie Wallace, Davy Burnaby, A. Bromley Davenport	Comedy	
Yes, Madam	Leslie S. Hiscott	Frank Pettingell, Kay Hammond, Harold French	Comedy	
Yes, Mr Brown	Herbert Wilcox	Jack Buchanan, Hartley Power, Elsie Randolph	Musical comedy	
You Made Me Love You	Monty Banks	Stanley Lupino, Thelma Todd, John Loder	Comedy	

== See also ==
- 1933 in British music
- 1933 in British television
- 1933 in film
- 1933 in the United Kingdom

== Bibliography ==
- Chibnall, Steve. Quota Quickies: The Birth of the British 'B' Film. British Film Institute, 2007.
- Low, Rachael. Filmmaking in 1930s Britain. George Allen & Unwin, 1985.
- Wood, Linda. British Films, 1927-1939. British Film Institute, 1986.
