= The River House Ghost =

1932 film

- Directed by: Frank Richardson
- Written by: Scott Darling
- Produced by: Irving Asher
- Starring: Florence Desmond; Hal Walters; Joan Marion
- Cinematography: Basil Emmott
- Production company: Warner Brothers-First National Productions
- Distributed by: First National Film Distributors
- Release date: December 1932
- Running time: 52 minutes
- Country: United Kingdom
- Language: English

The River House Ghost is a 1932 British comedy crime film directed by Frank Richardson and starring Florence Desmond, Hal Walters and Joan Marion. It was written by Scott Darling and shot at Teddington Studios by Warner Bros. for release as a quota quickie.

== Preservation status ==
The British Film Institute National Archive holds a collection of ephemera but no film or video materials.

== Premise ==
To persuade a woman to sell her house, an unscrupulous property agent employs three criminals to pretend to be ghosts and scare people away. They frighten two destitute workmen and a young girl, but they do not leave. When the crooks are exposed, on the arrival of the owner, she allows the destitutes to remain.

== Cast ==
- Florence Desmond as Flo
- Hal Walters as Walter
- Joan Marion as Sally
- Mike Johnson as Johnson
- Shayle Gardner as Skeleton
- Earle Stanley as Black Mask
- Helen Ferrers as Martha Usher

== Reception ==
Picturegoer wrote: "Florence Desmond's spirited interpretation of a destitute Cockney girl is the best part about this otherwise conventional 'haunted house' thriller, in which the ghosts are crooks who are trying to drive out the occupants for their own purpose."

Kine Weekly wrote: "Humorous characterisation and good acting combine to make it a useful light inclusion in the popular programine. Florence Desmond gives a spirited performance as Flo ... Shayle Gardner provides an impressive skeleton, while Hal Walters and Mike Johnson are robust as the two workmen."
