= Crossroads (1942 film) =

1942 mystery film noir by Jack Conway

- Theatrical release poster
- Directed by: Jack Conway
- Screenplay by: Guy Trosper
- Story by: John H. Kafka; Howard Emmett Rogers
- Based on: Crossroads; 1938 film by John H. Kafka
- Produced by: Edwin H. Knopf
- Starring: William Powell; Hedy Lamarr; Claire Trevor; Basil Rathbone
- Cinematography: Joseph Ruttenberg
- Edited by: George Boemler
- Music by: Bronislau Kaper
- Production company: Metro-Goldwyn-Mayer
- Distributed by: Loew's Inc.
- Release date: July 23, 1942 (New York)
- Running time: 83 minutes
- Country: United States
- Language: English
- Budget: $846,000
- Box office: $2,321,000

Crossroads is a 1942 American mystery film noir directed by Jack Conway and starring William Powell, Hedy Lamarr, Claire Trevor and Basil Rathbone. Powell plays a diplomat whose amnesia about his past subjects him to back-to-back blackmail schemes, which threaten his reputation, job, marriage, and future. The film was inspired by the 1938 French film Crossroads, which had also had a British remake, Dead Man's Shoes, in 1940.

== Plot ==
In 1935, rising French diplomat David Talbot and his beautiful much younger bride Lucienne are celebrating their third month of marriage. They are interrupted by a note from the mysterious Carlos Le Duc demanding one million francs from David in payment of an old debt. Never having met Le Duc, David has him arrested for attempted extortion. During the trial which follows, Le Duc claims that he knew David in 1922 as a petty criminal named Jean Pelletier.

Talbot maintains that amnesia he sustained in a devastating train accident that same year prevents him from remembering anything from that time. Talbot's identity is affirmed by the psychologist who treated him following the wreck, Dr. Tessier, ever since a family friend. Talbot's strategy is foiled by a psychologist for the defense, Dr. Alex Dubroc, who tricks Tessier into conceding the unreliability of a diagnosis of amnesia. He suggests Talbot fabricated his to hide his real identity. In fact, no one really knows, as two similar men had boarded the train but only one survived. Was it Pelletier or Talbot?

Michelle Allaine, a glamorous night club chanteuse, is introduced on behalf of the defense. Upon studying David closely she looks startled and identifies him as Pelletier, her former lover. The situation is saved by a surprise witness, Henri Sarrou, who produces documentation proving that he and Pelletier were roommates in an African hospital and that Pelletier died of illness. Le Duc is convicted.

Shortly after, Sarrou confronts David privately. He contends that David really is Pelletier, and collaborated with Sarrou and Le Duc in a decade-old robbery in which a courier was killed. He saved David at the trial only because he wants the million francs for himself; unless paid he will recant his testimony. Allaine separately corroborates that David and Pelletier are the same man, and that she still has feelings for him. Offended by David's hostile response, she shows him a locket containing a photo of the two of them together, adding that she will offer this important piece of evidence to Sarrou.

Not long afterwards, Mlle. Allaine makes a surprise appearance at the Talbot home, implicitly threatening David with exposure and planting suspicions in the mind of Lucienne. David conceals his worries as much as possible from his wife, but has begun to doubt his own identity.

Anxious to see Allaine again and draw her out further, David clandestinely visits her at the nightclub where she works. Still treating him as Pelletier, she accuses him of faking amnesia to justify the betrayal of his former friends, adding that his mother is living in penury in an adjacent neighborhood. David goes to the address Allaine gives him and meets the aged Madame Pelletier. She claims that he is not her son, but her demeanor suggests otherwise. Meanwhile Sarrou and Allaine confer together. The real Pelletier is dead and they are perpetrating a fraud on David, including the employment of an actress to play Madame Pelletier.

David, whose unhappy and furtive behavior has begun to worry Lucienne, collects his passport and tries to leave the country alone. Sarrou finds out what he is doing and blocks his attempt to escape, demanding his money.

David protests that he does not have access to such a large sum, then unwarily mentions the government funds stored in his office. Sarrou says that he can take the million francs from David's safe and make it look like an outside robbery.

The pair sneak past the guards at the foreign ministry and open the safe. Lucienne has been following David and now tries to intercede, but their argument is interrupted by the arrival of the police. The Talbots, Sarrou, and Allaine are all brought to headquarters, where David confesses to the old robbery and says he and his two accomplices must be punished for murder. Allaine panics and admits that David is not really Pelletier.

David reveals that he steered Sarrou to the idea of the robbery, then told the police to set an ambush in the office. His doubts about his identity were laid to rest when, looking at his passport photo, he realized that the picture in the locket was a fabrication - allegedly taken before his accident, it shows him with a hairstyle he only adopted to cover the scar on his head.

The actress who played Madame Pelletier is also arrested. With all four blackmailers behind bars, Talbot is cleared and his marriage and ambassadorial career are saved.

== Cast ==
- William Powell as David Talbot
- Hedy Lamarr as Lucienne Talbot
- Claire Trevor as Michelle Allaine
- Basil Rathbone as Henri Sarrou
- Margaret Wycherly as Madame Pelletier
- Felix Bressart as Dr. Andre Tessier
- Sig Ruman as Dr. Alex Dubroc
- H. B. Warner as the Prosecuting Attorney
- Philip Merivale as the Commissaire
- Vladimir Sokoloff as Carlos Le Duc
- Anna Q. Nilsson as Madame Deval
- Bertram Marburgh as Pierre
- John Mylong as Baron De Lorrain
- James Rennie Monsieur Charles Martin
- Alphonse Martell as Headwaiter
- Guy Bates Post as President of the Court
- Gibson Gowland as Reporter
- Louis Natheaux as Reporter
- Ellinor Vanderveer as Cafe Patron
- Fritz Lieber as Minister Deval (uncredited)
- John Nesbitt as Radio Commentator (uncredited)

== Reception ==
=== Box office ===
According to MGM records, the film cost $846,000 to make, and earned $1,523,000 in the US and Canada and $798,000 elsewhere, for a total of $2,231,000, making the studio a profit of $1,473,000, or 175% of its production costs.

=== Critical response ===
When the film was released, the staff at Variety magazine praised it, writing "This is a Grade A whodunit, with a superlative cast. The novel story line, which would do credit to an Alfred Hitchcock thriller, has the added potency of Hedy Lamarr and William Powell ... It’s good, escapist drama, without a hint of the war despite its Parisian locale, circa 1935, and evidences excellent casting and good direction. The script likewise well turned out, though better pace would have put the film in the smash class. Its only fault is a perceptible slowness at times, although the running time is a reasonable 82 minutes, caused by a plenitude of talk."

== Adaptation ==
The film was adapted for a Lux Radio Theatre broadcast on March 29, 1943, starring Jean-Pierre Aumont and Lana Turner.
