= What's in a Name? (1934 film) =

- Carol Goodner and Barry Clifton in the film
- Directed by: Ralph Ince
- Produced by: Irving Asher
- Starring: Carol Goodner Barry Clifton Reginald Purdell
- Cinematography: Basil Emmott
- Production company: Warner Brothers
- Distributed by: Warner Brothers
- Release date: 6 May 1934
- Running time: 48 minutes
- Country: United Kingdom
- Language: English

What's in a Name? is a 1934 British comedy film directed by Ralph Ince and starring Carol Goodner, Barry Clifton and Reginald Purdell. It was made at Teddington Studios by the British subsidiary of Warner Brothers.

== Preservation status ==
In 1992 the British Film Institute classed What's in a Name? as a lost film. Its National Archive now holds a copy of the film on video.

== Cast ==
- Carol Goodner as Marta Radovic
- Barry Clifton as George Andrews
- Reginald Purdell as Harry Stubbs
- Gyles Isham as Schultz
- Eve Gray as Mrs. Schultz
- Ernest Sefton as Light
- George Zucco as Foot
- Winifred Oughton as maid

== Reception ==
Kine Weekly wrote: "A silly tedious backstage comedy, with a feeble story, clumsy direction, and stodgy charactenisation. The happiest feature of the film is its accommodating length. ... Carol Goodner, given the opportunity, is a good actress, but the role of Marta fails to reveal her at anything like her best. Ernest Sefton and George Zucco score an occasional laugh as the excitable Foot and Light, but Barry Clifton, Reginald Purdell, Giles [sic] Isham and Eve Grey are small beer in support. ... This old-fashioned stuff is only suitable for a music hall sketch, the screen amplifies its weaknesses, particularly the paucity of its humour."

The Daily Film Renter wrote: "Picture stretches long arm of coincidence needlessly, but is played against attractive variety of settings. Quota subject for the uncritical. ... Carol Goodner hardly succeeds with the role of the temperamental Marta Radovic. Barry Clifton, as the composer, with Reginald Purdell as his manager and Gyles Isham as the substitute, turn in average performances."

Picturegoer wrote: "Feeble comedy of the old-fashioned music-hall sketch variety, in which the artistes are far too handicapped by their material to show to any advantage. Characterisation is negligible as is its humour."

Picture Show wrote: "Unpretentious amusement is provided by this far-fetched story of a girl from the provinces and her exploitation as a temperamental Continental star. The cast is competent, direction straightforward."
