= Double Wedding =

Double Wedding may refer to:

- Double Wedding (1937 film), an American romantic comedy film
- Double Wedding (1933 film), a British comedy film
- Double Wedding (2010 film), an American television film
- Double wedding
