= The Bermondsey Kid =

1933 British film by Ralph Dawson

- Directed by: Ralph Dawson
- Written by: Scott Darling; Bill Evans
- Produced by: Irving Asher
- Starring: Esmond Knight; Pat Peterson; Ellis Irving; Ernest Sefton
- Cinematography: Basil Emmott
- Distributed by: Warner Brothers
- Release date: November 1933
- Running time: 75 minutes
- Country: United Kingdom
- Language: English

The Bermondsey Kid is a 1933 British drama film directed by Ralph Dawson and starring Esmond Knight, Pat Peterson, Ellis Irving and Ernest Sefton. A newsboy enters a boxing championship where he is matched with a sick friend.

== Cast ==
- Esmond Knight as Eddie Martin
- Ellis Irving as Joe Dougherty
- Pat Peterson as Mary
- Ernest Sefton as Lou Rodman
- Clifford McLaglen as Bates
- Eve Gray as Toots
- Syd Crossley as Porky
- Winifred Oughton as Mrs Bodge
- Len Harvey as himself
- Henry Mason as himself
- Val Guest as minor role

== See also ==
- List of boxing films
