= The Church Mouse =

1934 British film by Monty Banks

- DVD cover
- Directed by: Monty Banks
- Written by: Scott Darling; Ladislas Fodor (play); Thomas J. Geraghty
- Produced by: Irving Asher
- Starring: Laura La Plante; Ian Hunter; Edward Chapman
- Cinematography: Basil Emmott
- Production company: Warner Bros. Pictures
- Distributed by: Warner Bros. Pictures
- Release date: 10 December 1934
- Running time: 76 minutes
- Country: United Kingdom
- Language: English

The Church Mouse is a 1934 British comedy film directed by Monty Banks and starring Laura La Plante, Ian Hunter and Edward Chapman. It was made by the British subsidiary of Warner Brothers at the company's Teddington Studios. It was made as a more expensive production than much of the studio's low-budget quota quickie output.

It is based on a 1928 play by Ladislas Fodor which has been turned into films on several occasions including a 1931 German film Poor as a Church Mouse and the 1932 American production Beauty and the Boss. A bank owner's prim and uptight Secretary suddenly blossoms during a business trip to Paris.

== Plot ==
The opening scenes show the historical development of Steele's Bank in London as it adopts first steel pens and then typewriters during the nineteenth century. In 1934 the current head of the bank Jonathan Steele is as technology-obsessed as his predecessors and installs an intercom and constantly flies by plane.

Steele strictly divides his life between work and pleasure. He dismisses a very attractive secretary who is distracting him by trying to seduce him at work, in order that they can become lovers after office hours. This creates a vacancy which a hard-pressed young woman, Betty Miller, who self-describes herself as a "church mouse", fills by showing Steele how super-efficient she is.

Miller rapidly becomes invaluable to Steele, but comes to resent the fact that only sees her as an employee rather than a woman. While in Paris, in order to seal a major business deal she has a major makeover, and suddenly finds herself attracting a great deal of male attention.

== Cast ==
- Laura La Plante as Betty 'Miss Church Mouse' Miller
- Ian Hunter as Jonathan Steele
- Edward Chapman as Mr. 'Pinky' Wormwood
- Jane Carr as Miss Sylvia James
- Clifford Heatherley as Sir Oswald Bottomley
- John Batten as Geoffrey Steele
- Gibb McLaughlin as Thomas Stubbings, Cashier
- Monty Banks as Harry Blump, the Window Washer
- Florence Wood as Betty's Mother

== Bibliography ==
- Low, Rachael. Filmmaking in 1930s Britain. George Allen & Unwin, 1985.
- Wood, Linda. British Films, 1927-1939. British Film Institute, 1986.
