= It's in the Bag (1936 film) =

- Nervo and Knox in the film
- Directed by: William Beaudine
- Written by: Brock Williams; Russell G. Medcraft
- Produced by: Irving Asher
- Starring: Jimmy Nervo; Teddy Knox; Jack Barty; George Carney
- Cinematography: Basil Emmott
- Edited by: Bert Bates
- Production company: Warner Bros.
- Distributed by: Warner Bros.
- Release date: September 1936
- Running time: 80 minutes
- Country: United Kingdom
- Language: English

It's in the Bag is a 1936 British comedy film directed by William Beaudine and starring Jimmy Nervo, Teddy Knox and Jack Barty. It was written by Brock Williams and Russell G. Medcraft, and made at Teddington Studios by the British subsidiary of Warner Brothers. Art direction was by Peter Proud.

== Plot summary ==
Nervo and Knox are two Covent Garden porters who lose their jobs through oversleeping, then find work as furniture removers. Chaos ensues after they discover an abandoned bag of £5 notes, open a cabaret, then get into deep trouble when the cash turns out to be counterfeit.

== Cast ==
- Jimmy Nervo as Jimmy
- Teddy Knox as Teddy
- Jack Barty as Bert
- George Carney as Blumfield
- Rene Hunter as Ethel
- Ursula Hirst as Vi
- Aubrey Dexter as Peters
- Hal Gordon as boss
- Ernest Sefton as Jerry Gee
- C. Denier Warren as Emery
- Glen Alyn as Fifi

== Reception ==
The Monthly Film Bulletin wrote: "This slight and casually told story is designed as a vehicle for the characteristic buffoonery of Nervo and Knox, and they 'do their stuff' unsparingly. The result is slapstick of the most violent kind. Kicks, falls and tumbles befall humans and crockery unceasingly. The dialogue is neither original nor funny; the gags are familiar. Their burlesque of classical dancing is not very original but is nevertheless very funny. ... The actors other than Nervo and Knox have little to do. The two comedians get their laughs, but a better film would have resulted had the pace been quickened, and the whole shortened."

The Daily Film Renter wrote: "Co-stars work hard in long sessions of acrobatic tumbling and clowning, rising to best occasion with burlesque adagio dance featuring large balloon, but material is woefully poor, and direction uninspired."
