= Murder at the Inn =

1934 film

- Harold French and Wendy Barrie in the film
- Directed by: George King
- Written by: Randall Faye
- Produced by: Irving Asher
- Starring: Wendy Barrie; Harold French; Jane Carr
- Cinematography: Basil Emmott
- Production company: Warner Brothers
- Distributed by: Warner Brothers
- Release date: 25 June 1934
- Running time: 55 minutes
- Country: United Kingdom
- Language: English

Murder at the Inn (also known as Other Men's Women) is a 1934 British comedy crime film directed by George King and starring Wendy Barrie, Harold French and Jane Carr. It was written by Randall Faye, and was a quota quickie, made at Teddington Studios by the British subsidiary of Warner Brothers.

== Preservation status ==
The British Film Institute National Archive holds a collection of stills but no film or video materials.

== Plot ==
Angela, being forbidden by her father Colonel Worthing to marry Tony, has eloped with him. They arrive at a country inn, where, by coincience, Fifi, a gold-digger, has also arrived, to attempt to recover from the landlord blackmail letters, written by the Colonel. The landlord is then murdered by crooks who escape with the letters. Angela manages to recover the letters and uses them to persuade her father to consent to her marriage to Tony.

== Cast ==
- Wendy Barrie as Angela
- Harold French as Tony
- Jane Carr as Fifi
- Davy Burnaby as Colonel Worthing
- Nicholas Hannen as Dedreet
- Minnie Rayner as aunt
- Harold Saxon-Snell as the Inspector

== Reception ==
Kine Weekly wrote: "Farcical comedy, set in an atmosphere of crime, which relies upon simple, artless complications for its somewhat meagre entertainment. The producer fails to take firm hold of production with the result that it vacillates rather disconcertingly between the serious and the comic. ... The farcical situations have piquancy but fail to blend harmoniously into the eerie backgrounds against which they are played."

The Daily Film Renter wrote: "This film is not, as its title would seem to indicate, a grim murder mystery. Rather is it a disconcerting blend of farce comedy and melodrama, with characters rushing in and out of bedrooms, lying like Trojans, and generally behaving in a stupid manner. There is a murder, but it is so sketchily presented that it fails to provide even the smallest thrill."

Picture Show wrote: "Artificial story in which the long arm of coincidence is stretched somewhat abnormally. It is a mixture of melodrama, sex, comedy and romance ... The comedy is rather of the tittering kind than genuine laugh-provoking, while the cast is quite competent, Jane Carr scoring as the gold-digging Fifi."
