= Widow's Might =

- Garry Marsh, Barry Clifton and Laura La Plante in the film.
- Directed by: Cyril Gardner
- Screenplay by: Rowland Brown, Frederick J. Jackson (play) and Brock Williams
- Produced by: Irving Asher
- Starring: Laura La Plante; Yvonne Arnaud; Garry Marsh
- Cinematography: Basil Emmott
- Production company: Warner Brothers-First National
- Release date: January 1935
- Running time: 77min
- Country: United Kingdom
- Language: English

Widow's Might is a 1935 British comedy film directed by Cyril Gardner and starring Laura La Plante, Yvonne Arnaud and Garry Marsh. Produced by Irving Asher, it was based on the play The Widow's Might by Frederick J. Jackson, adapted by Rowland Brown and Brock Williams and filmed by Warner Brothers at Teddington Studios.

== Preservation status ==
The British Film Institute National Archive holds a collection of stills but no film or video materials.

== Plot ==
Wealthy young widow Nancy Tweesdale has previously jilted solicitor Cyril Monks before marrying her recently deceased husband, and now wants him to take interest in her again. When he fails to do so, with the help of her friend Princess Suzanne she stages a fake jewel robbery, hoping that it will interest him. But Cyril hears about her scheme via her butler Champion, and turns the tables on her.

== Cast ==
- Laura La Plante as Nancy Tweesdale
- Yvonne Arnaud as Princess Suzanne
- Garry Marsh as Barry Carrington
- George Curzon as Champion
- Barry Clifton as Cyril Monks
- Margaret Yarde as Cook
- Davina Craig as Amelia
- Joan Hickson as Burroughs
- Hugh E. Wright as Peasgood
- Hay Plumb as Sergeant Dawkins

== Reception ==
Kine Weekly wrote: "Farcical comedy, artless fun which turns engagingly on 'biter bit' theme, tempering its humour with pleasing romance. The acting and presentation are quite good, but the filing is a little too dependent upon dialogue to be an entire success. Although much of the development is diverting, pepping up by means of drastic cutting would definitely strengthen the film's entertainment and market. Adequate supporting feature for popular halls."

The Daily Film Renter wrote: "Developed on stagy lines, but has quota of piquant humour in manner in which scheme mis-carries. Bright lines add values to ingenious plot. Laura La Plante gives amusing performance, capitally supported by Yvonne Arnaud as vivacious French Princess. Good popular entertainment of pleasing pattern."

Picturegoer wrote: "The main attraction in this artless and somewhat old-fashioned little farce, which is quite well presented but depends too much on dialogue to be wholly successful, is Yvonne Arnaud's provocative characterisation."
