= Crossroads (1938 film) =

1938 French drama film

- Directed by: Curtis Bernhardt
- Written by: André-Paul Antoine; Curtis Bernhardt; Lilo Dammert; John H. Kafka; Robert Liebmann
- Produced by: Eugène Tucherer
- Starring: Charles Vanel; Jules Berry; Suzy Prim
- Cinematography: Léonce-Henri Burel; Georges Régnier; Henri Tiquet
- Edited by: Adolf Lantz
- Music by: Paul Dessau
- Production company: B.U.P. Française
- Distributed by: Les Films de Koster
- Release date: 9 September 1938
- Running time: 84 minutes
- Country: France
- Language: French

Crossroads (French: Carrefour) is a 1938 French mystery drama film directed by Curtis Bernhardt and starring Charles Vanel, Jules Berry and Suzy Prim. It inspired two English-language remakes, the 1940 British film Dead Man's Shoes and Hollywood's Crossroads in 1942. It was shot at the Billancourt Studios in Paris and on location in the city. The film's sets were designed by the art director Jean d'Eaubonne and Raymond Gabutti.

== Synopsis ==
A wealthy industrialist, Rogger de Vetheuil, takes a blackmailer to court, who has accused him of being in reality one Pelletier, a criminal who deserted from the French Army twenty years before during the First World War. Injuries at the battle of the Somme in 1917 have deprived him of his memory. Much to his distress, a woman, Michele Allain, claims that she knew him as Pelletier, before the war, and that they were lovers. But de Vetheuil wins his case when another witness, Lucien Sarroux, testifies of having met the real Pelletier and been present at his deathbed some years before. Only after the trial is over, does Sarroux confront de Vetheuil, alleging that he was indeed Pelletier and demanding blackmail on his own. A visit by de Vetheuil to a woman who is alleged to be, but denies, being his mother, leaves him convinced that she is lying for his sake, and that he was mistaken for the real heir to the de Vetheuil estate. Calling on Michele Allain at her night club, he grows even surer that they must have had a relationship.

With his son taunted at school about his father having been a great gangster, de Vetheuil resolves to give up his fortune and flee Paris with his family.  He is also prepared to pay Sarroux, until it becomes clear that the demands will never stop.  Intending to shoot him, he does not have the chance.  But once Sarroux reaches Allain's and his apartment, and with the police on their way to arrest him, she kills him, because she has fallen in love with de Vetheuil -- or perhaps fallen back in love with him, depending on whether he was indeed Pelletier. Shooting herself, she has just time enough to tell the police that de Vetheuil and Pelletier were different people, that she had never seen de Vetheuil before that day when she testified at the trial, that the whole story was worked up by herself and her accomplice as a blackmail scheme.  But we are left much less certain, particularly since her dying "confession" begins with statements that we know are quite untrue. In her last exchange of glances with de Vetheuil, the possibility is left that he was indeed Pelletier and that it is her rekindled love that has made her lie for him and his family's sake.

== Cast ==
- Charles Vanel as Roger de Vétheuil
- Jules Berry as Lucien Sarroux
- Suzy Prim as Michèle Allain
- Tania Fédor as Anna de Vétheuil
- Marcelle Géniat as Mme. Pelletier
- Jean Claudio as Paul de Vétheuil
- Annie France as L'entraîneuse
- Pierre Palau as Leduc - le 1er maître-chanteur
- Marcel Melrac as Un gendarme
- Paul Amiot as Le président
- Christian Argentin as Anwalt, l'avocat
- Eddy Debray as Un accusé
- Jean Tissier as L'employé de l'agence de voyage
- Auguste Bovério as Pierre
- Marcel Duhamel as Le domestique
- Gustave Gallet as Le chirurgien
- Denise Kerny as La caissière
- Liliane Lesaffre as La concierge
- Albert Malbert as Le concierge
- Marcel Pérès as Le préposé au tribunal
- Robert Rollis as Un élève
- Otto Wallburg as Le médecin allemand

== Bibliography ==
- Ruth Barton. Hedy Lamarr: The Most Beautiful Woman in Film. University Press of Kentucky, 2010.
