= That's the Ticket =

- Directed by: Redd Davis
- Written by: John Dighton; Jack Henley; Frank Richardson
- Produced by: A.M. Salomon
- Starring: Sid Field; Hal Walters; Betty Lynne
- Cinematography: Basil Emmott
- Edited by: Terence Fisher
- Music by: Bretton Byrd
- Production company: Warner Brothers-First National Productions
- Distributed by: Warner Bros.
- Release date: 12 October 1940
- Running time: 63 minutes
- Country: United Kingdom
- Language: English
- Budget: £17,306
- Box office: £10,865

That's the Ticket is a 1940 British comedy film directed by Redd Davis and starring Sid Field, Hal Walters and Betty Lynne. It was written by John Dighton, Jack Henley and Frank Richardson.

== Synopsis ==
Two cloakroom attendants at a London nightclub become entangled with an enemy spy ring in an adventure that takes them to Paris.

== Cast ==
- Sid Field as Ben Baker
- Hal Walters as Nosey
- Betty Lynne as Fifi
- Gus McNaughton as Milkbar Monty
- Gordon McLeod as Ferdinand
- Charles Castella as The Bull
- Gibb McLaughlin as The Count
- Ian McLean as Hercule
- Ernest Sefton as Marchand

== Production ==
It was shot at Teddington Studios. The sets were designed by the art director Norman G. Arnold.

== Reception ==
Kine Weekly wrote: "The comedy is presented with a sublime disregard for story values, continuity and, for that matter, every other canon of light entertainment. Rather does it revive old-time knockabout music-hall technique. Revival or not, it pays a good dividend in honest laughter. There is'a swift succession of hearty gags, and all have the merit of good teamwork and timing. The presentation is, for the most part, spectacular."

Variety wrote: "This is an English comedy film, made in England, that's above kindergarten and pretty well streamlined at that. That's the Ticket has laughs and situations of good quality. Story hangs together intelligently though its chief weakness is in the pacing. ... Field has a ready knack of playing for camera, with only an occasional lapse into the Lancashire variety turn. More film work should establish his polished playing for pix. Walters works with him nicely and Miss Lynne is comely, playing this one as a Frenchie. ... Direction is by Redd Davis, who has turned out a competent feature from script of Frank Richardson and John Dighton. Latter's screenplay could have been tightened."
