= Going Straight (1933 film) =

1933 film

- Directed by: John Rawlins
- Produced by: Irving Asher
- Starring: Moira Lynd; Helen Ferrers; Joan Marion
- Cinematography: Basil Emmott
- Production company: Warner Brothers
- Distributed by: Warner Brothers
- Release date: March 1933
- Running time: 48 minutes
- Country: United Kingdom
- Language: English

Going Straight is a 1933 British comedy film directed by John Rawlins and starring Moira Lynd, Helen Ferrers and Joan Marion. It was made at Teddington Studios as a quota quickie.

== Preservation status ==
The British Film Institute National Archive holds a collection of stills but no film or video materials.

== Plot ==
Peggy Edwards is secretary to Lady Peckham, and to thank them for saving her father from criminal charges, she household jobs for reformed crooks Hawkins and Macklin. In an effort to protect Peggy from the unwanted advances of Lady Peckham's son John, Hawkins and Macklin are arrested for robbery, but their alibi leads to romance between Peggy and John.

== Cast ==
- Moira Lynd as Peggy Edwards
- Helen Ferrers as Lady Peckham
- Tracy Holmes
- Joan Marion
- Hal Walters
- Huntley Wright
- Eric Stanley
- George Merritt
- Gilbert Davis

== Reception ==
Kine Weekly wrote: "Thin crook comedy-drama, entirely lacking in pep and originality The flimsy story leaves the players to their own resources and their painful lack of experience lets the entertainment heavily down. Eligibility for quota purposes is the picture s only booking angle."

The Daily Film Renter wrote: "Inadequate direction fails to secure interest in a ludicrous plot, which is decked out with trite dialogue and highly artificial situations. Entertainment only for the unexacting patron."

Picturegoer wrote: "Entirely unoriginal and flimsy story, which is weak and amateurish in production generally. The acting is unremarkable and there is little to recommend it as entertainment."
