= The Life of the Party (1934 film) =

- Trade adveristisement from The Daily Film Renter (18 July 1934)
- Directed by: Ralph Dawson
- Written by: Salisbury Field
- Based on: Play by Margaret Mayo; Brock Williams
- Produced by: Irving Asher
- Starring: Jerry Verno; Betty Astell; Eric Fawcett
- Cinematography: Basil Emmott
- Edited by: William Holmes
- Production company: Warner Brothers
- Distributed by: Warner Brothers
- Release date: 20 July 1934
- Running time: 53 minutes
- Country: United Kingdom
- Language: English

The Life of the Party is a 1934 British comedy film directed by Ralph Dawson and starring Jerry Verno, Betty Astell and Eric Fawcett. It was written by Salisbury Field based on the play by Margaret Mayo and Brock Williams, and made by Warner Brothers as a quota quickie at Teddington Studios.

== Preservation status ==
The British Film Institute National Archive holds a collection of stills but no film or video materials.

== Plot ==
Arthur Bleeby is a mild-mannered clerk who dreams of becoming the life of the party but consistently finds himself overshadowed by more charismatic personalities. His mundane existence takes an unexpected turn when he becomes entangled in the romantic complications of the Hopkins siblings – the vivacious Blanche and her protective brother Harry.

When Arthur develops feelings for Blanche, he must compete with the smooth-talking Andrew Larkin for her affections. Meanwhile, Arthur's wife Caroline grows increasingly suspicious of her husband's newfound social ambitions and late-night activities.

The situation becomes more complicated when the sophisticated Dora Reeves enters the picture, bringing her own romantic agenda that threatens to upset the delicate balance of relationships. As Arthur attempts to reinvent himself as a popular socialite, he finds himself caught between his domestic responsibilities and his desire for excitement.

The comedy builds to a climax at a party where Arthur's various deceptions and romantic entanglements come to a head, forcing him to choose between his fantasies of social success and the reality of his everyday life. Through a series of mistaken identities and comic misunderstandings, Arthur learns that being the life of the party isn't as glamorous as he imagined.

== Cast ==
- Jerry Verno as Arthur Bleeby
- Betty Astell as Blanche Hopkins
- Eric Fawcett as Harry Hopkins
- Vera Bogetti as Caroline Bleeby
- Kenneth Kove as Andrew Larkin
- Hermione Hannen as Dora Reeves
- Phyllis Morris as Clarice

== Reception ==
Kine Weekly wrote: "Very weak domestic comedy story ... Jerry Verno has no material worth while. The drunken act is so stale and out-moded that it becomes definitely boring. The rest of the acting is indifferent in quality. The thoroughly conventional plot is handled in a manner which seems almost amateurish. The dialogue is stilted and the general impression is one of forced gaiety. Characterisation, which should play a big part in domestic comedies, is negligible."

The Daily Film Renter wrote: "Mediocre direction fails to invest hackneyed material with much entertainment value, while alcoholic humour tends to become wearisome."
