= High Society (1932 film) =

1932 film

- Directed by: John Rawlins
- Screenplay by: Scott Darling; Randall Faye
- Produced by: Irving Asher
- Starring: Florence Desmond; William Austin; Emily Fitzroy
- Production company: Warner Brothers-First National Productions
- Distributed by: Warner Brothers
- Release date: December 1938
- Running time: 50 minutes
- Country: United Kingdom
- Language: English

High Society is a 1932 British comedy film directed by John Rawlins and starring Florence Desmond, William Austin and Emily Fitzroy.

It was made as a quota quickie at Teddington Studios by the British subsidiary of Warner Brothers.

== Cast ==
- Florence Desmond as Florrie
- William Austin as Wilberforce Strangeways
- Emily Fitzroy as Mrs. Strangeways
- Tracy Holmes as Hon. Tommy Montgomery
- Joan Wyndham as Betty Cunningham-Smith
- Margaret Damer as Mrs. Cunningham-Smith
- Leo Sheffield as Lord Halkirk
- Syd Crossley as Simeon

== Bibliography ==
- Chibnall, Steve. Quota Quickies: The Birth of the British 'B' Film. British Film Institute, 2007.
