= His Brother's Keeper (1940 film) =

- Frame from the film
- Directed by: Roy William Neill
- Written by: Austin Melford; Brock Williams; Roy William Neill
- Produced by: Samuel Sax
- Starring: Clifford Evans; Tamara Desni; Una O'Connor
- Cinematography: Basil Emmott
- Music by: Bretton Byrd
- Production company: Warner Brothers-First National Productions
- Distributed by: Warner Bros.
- Release date: 27 January 1940
- Running time: 70 minutes
- Country: United Kingdom
- Language: English
- Budget: £18,238
- Box office: £10,383

His Brother's Keeper is a lost 1940 British second feature ('B') crime film directed by Roy William Neill and starring Clifford Evans, Tamara Desni and Una O'Connor. It was written by Austin Melford, Brock Williams and Neill.

== Preservation status ==
The British Film Institute has classed His Brother's Keeper as a lost film. Its National Archive holds a collection of stills but no film or video materials.

== Plot ==
A successful sharp shooting act is threatened when a gold-digging blues singer attempts to split them up.

== Cast ==
- Clifford Evans as Jack Cornell
- Tamara Desni as Olga
- Una O'Connor as Eva
- Peter Glenville as Hicky
- Reginald Purdell as Bunny Reeves
- Ronald Frankau as George Hollis
- Antoinette Lupino as Pat
- Aubrey Dexter as Sylvester
- Frederick Burtwell as Harry
- Roddy McDowall as boy

== Production ==
It was made at Teddington Studios and was completed before the outbreak of the Second World War.

== Reception ==
The Monthly Film Bulletin wrote: "The story opens slowly and gradually achieves a rhythm of suspense. The photography is very sharp and clear, which helps to intensify the atmosphere of strain. The film is very well cast, especially Peter Glenville as the idealistic Hicky and Clifford Evans as the elder brother brusquely devoted to the younger. The minor characters are also well worked out, Una O'Connor as Olga's dresser, particularly, adding many touches to the detail of the story. The direction by Roy William Neill is excellent."

Kine Weekly wrote: "An artificial story set in an artificial world, its emotionalism is mostly superficial. Still, if it seldom approximates to life, it is at least good theatre, and on this score it is entitled to a measure of popular approbation. The principal players, none of whom is unknown, are adequate in the circumstances, and the ambitious settings have an aura of authenticity. ... It is not easy to believe the unsophisticated Hicky could share an act with his cynical brother Jack without gaining some knowledge of the ways of women of the world, but this fundamental extravagance apart the film does not make bad dramatic entertainment. Love, filial and profane, is responsible for moving emotionalism. The sharpshooting act contributes to essential excitement. The ending, too, has a note of irony as well as one of tragedy. Staging is particularly good."

The Daily Film Renter wrote: "Tensely worked out, with holding climax, story is elegantly staged ... It is not a pretty tale, but it is deftly presented, with smart directorial touches, and packs a suspenseful climax."

Picturegoer wrote: "The variety stage background is not convincing but it is well set technically; although one never really believes in the characters, there is a certain amount of dramatic conflict and emotional thrill. Tamara Desni sings and dances and does not act badly as the woman in the case; Clifford Evans is sound if a little unrestrained as the elder brother and Peter Glenville is suitably susceptible as the young brother."
