= Her Night Out =

1932 film

- Lester Matthews and Jack Raine in the film.
- Directed by: William C. McGann
- Written by: Scott Darling
- Produced by: Irving Asher
- Starring: Dorothy Bartlam; Lester Matthews; Joan Marion
- Cinematography: Basil Emmott
- Production company: Warner Brothers
- Distributed by: Warner Brothers
- Release date: October 1932
- Running time: 45 minutes
- Country: United Kingdom
- Language: English

Her Night Out (also known as Alone at Last) is a 1932 British comedy film directed by William C. McGann and starring Dorothy Bartlam, Lester Matthews and Joan Marion. It was written by Scott Darling, and was made as a quota quickie at Teddington Studios by the British subsidiary of the Hollywood studio Warner Brothers.

== Preservation status ==
The British Film Institute National Archive holds no stills or ephemera, and no film or video materials.

== Synopsis ==
A married couple accidentally become mixed up with a bank robber.

== Cast ==
- Dorothy Bartlam as Kitty Vickery
- Lester Matthews as Gerald Vickery
- Joan Marion as Goldie
- Jack Raine as Jim Hanley
- Dodo Watts as Toots

== Reception ==
Kine Weekly wrote: "Slight marital comedy which, while it has some amusing situations, lacks the necessary sparkle and polish to make them register very effectively. ... William McGann has failed to invest his story with the necessary punch essential to the type of farcical comedy with which he is dealing. The continuity is rather ragged and the dialogue lacking generally in wit and sparkle."

Picturegoer wrote: "Slight story of a tiff between a husband and wife which leads the pair into contact with crooks. It lacks the sparkle and polish to be really effective, and the dialogue is distinctly weak. The acting is not remarkable and in some cases over-emphasised to the point of artificiality."
