= No Escape (1934 film) =

- Binnie Barnes and Ian Hunter in the film
- Directed by: Ralph Ince
- Written by: Scott Darling
- Produced by: Irving Asher
- Starring: Ian Hunter; Binnie Barnes; Molly Lamont
- Cinematography: Basil Emmott
- Production company: Warner Brothers
- Distributed by: Warner Brothers
- Release date: 26 November 1934
- Running time: 71 minutes
- Country: United Kingdom
- Language: English

No Escape is a lost 1934 British drama film directed by Ralph Ince and starring Ian Hunter, Binnie Barnes and Molly Lamont. It was written by Scott Darling, and was made at Teddington Studios by the British subsidiary of Warner Brothers.

== Preservation status ==
The British Film Institute has classed No Escape as a lost film. Its National Archive holds a collection of ephemera and stills but no film or video materials.

== Plot ==
Jim Brandon, a rubber planter in Malaysia, has been wrongly convicted of poisoning his business partner, and together with cellmate Lucky, escapes captivity, holding away in a ship bound for England. At London docks, after Brandon flees the ship, Lucky is found dead from Bubonic plague, and the hunt is on for Brandon, carrying the disease.

== Cast ==
- Ian Hunter as Jim Brandon
- Binnie Barnes as Myra Fengler
- Ralph Ince as Lucky
- Molly Lamont as Helen Arnold
- Charles Carson as Mr. Arnold
- Philip Strange as Kirk Fengler
- Madeline Seymour as Mrs. Arnold
- George Merritt as Inspector Matheson

== Reception ==
The Daily Film Renter wrote: "Direction adequate, but narrative does not completely convince. Best acting comes from Ralph Ince as American tough. ... Varied settings include a Malayan jungle, a Singapore shack, an ocean liner, and English countryside exteriors. ... Ralph Ince takes the acting honours as Lucky, playing the role with an attractive brand of ironic philosophy, Ian Hunter is fair as Jim, but Binnie Barnes is colourless as Myra. Molly Lamont, ivho has been well photographed, is a conventional heroine, being inclined to over-dramatise her part."

Picture Show wrote: "Ian Hunter gives a good performance, and is ably supported by Binnie Barnes. The remainder of the cast are good. Photography and settings are clever."
