= Gaol Break =

- Elliot Mason and Ralph Ince in the film
- Directed by: Ralph Ince
- Written by: Michael Barringer
- Produced by: Irving Asher
- Starring: Ralph Ince; Basil Gill; Raymond Lovell
- Cinematography: Basil Emmott
- Production company: Warner Brothers
- Distributed by: Warner Brothers
- Release date: March 1936
- Running time: 64 minutes
- Country: United Kingdom
- Language: English

Gaol Break (also known as Gaolbreak and Bill and Son) is a lost 1936 British crime film directed by Ralph Ince and starring Ince, Basil Gill and Raymond Lovell. It was written by Michael Barringer and made as a quota quickie at Teddington Studios by the British subsidiary of Warner Brothers.

== Preservation status ==
The British Film Institute has classed Gaol Break as a lost film. Its National Archive holds a collection of stills but no film or video materials.

== Plot ==
Jim Oakley breaks out of prison to visit his small son Mickie, who is in the care of a trio of crooks. He discovers that the crooks are planning to convince a wealthy American couple, the Kendalls, that Mickie is their kidnapped child. Following the villains to the Kendalls' luxury yacht, he sees that Mr Kendall has become attached to Mickie and has accepted him as his own child. Jim realises that the Americans can give Mickie a far better life than he ever can, and lets them take him.

== Cast ==
- Ralph Ince as Jim Oakley
- Pat Fitzpatrick as Mickie Oakley
- Basil Gill as Dr. Walter Merkin
- Raymond Lovell as Duke
- Lorna Hubbard as Daisy Oakley
- Roy Findlay as Louie
- Elliott Mason as Euphie
- Desmond Roberts as Paul Kendall

== Reception ==
The Monthly Film Bulletin wrote: "Ralph Ince as Jim is a rough diamond with an understandable urge to risk anything for Mickie's sake and Elliot Mason, as Euphy, the barge owner, is a joy every time she opens her mouth. The settings are realistic. A film out of the usual run."

Kine Weekly wrote: "Popular sentiment is likely to be gripped by an unusual story of child kidnapping, the underworld, and a father's self-sacrifice for his boy. Production values vary, but some imaginative and gripping sequences, the performance of Ralph Ince in one of his virile roles, and that of a very natural youngster combine to make a worth-while offer. ... Ralph Ince, in the full-blooded role of gaol-bird, puts up a natural and convincing performance. ... Sequences dealing in turn with the action of the crooks, the parents of a kidnapped child, the police adi the child's father are apt to result in a jerky continuity. Nevertheless each scene reveals economy of dialogue, combined with action and good local colour."

The Daily Film Renter wrote: "Ably directed, contains fair supply of action, interesting performance by child actor and outstanding portrayal by Elliot Mason as sharp-tongued but warm-hearted barge owner. Thames-side and prison settings back subject, which should make acceptable booking of popular calibre."

Picturegoer wrote: "Ralph Ince gives a spirited and sympathetic performance as Jim, Basil Gill is polished as a doctor and little Pat Fitzpatrick proves that clever child actors are by no means an American monopoly."

Picture Show wrote: "Sincerely told and acted drama ... The sympathetic handling of the story never descends to mawkishness, and there is no lack of action. Entertaining."
