= Call Me Mame =

1933 British film by John Daumery

- John Batten, Dorothy Bartlam, Ethel Irving and Julian Royce in the film
- Directed by: John Daumery
- Written by: Randall Faye
- Produced by: Irving Asher
- Starring: Ethel Irving; John Batten; Dorothy Bartlam
- Cinematography: Basil Emmott
- Production company: Warner Brothers
- Distributed by: Warner Brothers
- Release date: 1933
- Running time: 59 minutes
- Country: United Kingdom
- Language: English

Call Me Mame is a 1933 British comedy film directed by John Daumery and starring Ethel Irving, John Batten and Dorothy Bartlam. It was written by Randall Faye and made at Teddington Studios as a quota quickie.

== Plot ==
Gordon Roantree inherits a peerage and discovers that his mother Mame whom he had believed dead, is in fact alive and well in Mexico. He arranges for her to come to England and is flabbergasted to find she is a tough bar-room singer. Mame soon realises that she cannot fit into her son's Society life, and leaves, pretending that she is not his mother at all.

== Preservation status ==
The British Film Institute National Archive holds a collection of stills but no film or video materials.

== Cast ==
- Ethel Irving as Mame
- John Batten as Gordon Roantree
- Dorothy Bartlam as Tess Lennox
- Winifred Oughton as Victoria
- Julian Royce as Poulton
- Arthur Maude as father
- Alice O'Day as mother
- Pat Fitzpatrick as child
- Carroll Gibbons as Leader of the Savoy Orpheans

== Reception ==
Kine Weekly wrote: "Low comedy-drama, heavily draped with maternal sentiment, so old-fashioned in story, acting and treatment, that, if it were not for its modern technical qualities it might pardonably be mistaken for a reissue. Ethel Levey works hard and displays versatility, but her performance steeped in the tradition of the music-hall, is unlikely to find full appreciation from this generation of picturegoers. Moderate quota film for unexacting patrons."

The Daily Film Renter wrote: "Slender mother-love drama fashioned round personality of Ethel Levey. Other characters subordinated to star, allowing her full expression and opportunity to put over series of songs. ... Miss Levey's style is well known, and the value of the picture can best be assessed in terms of her popularity."

Picturegoer wrote: "Ethel Levey's talkie debut hardly reveals the vivid personality which dominated the pre-war Empire. She plays a 'tough' momma vigorously, but it tends to the vulgar and the sentimental moments do not quite hit the mark. She sings some songs which the mike render rather over-poweringin effect. Certainly the material at her command is poor. It is old-fashioned low-comedy drama with little appeal to a critical audience."
