= The Blind Spot (1932 film) =

1932 British film by John Daumery

Blind Spot
- Warwick Ward and Muriel Angelus in the film
- Directed by: John Daumery
- Written by: Roland Pertwee; John Hastings Turner
- Produced by: Irving Asher
- Starring: Percy Marmont; Muriel Angelus; Warwick Ward
- Cinematography: Basil Emmott
- Production company: Warner Brothers
- Distributed by: Warner Brothers
- Release date: October 1932
- Running time: 75 minutes
- Country: United Kingdom
- Language: English

The Blind Spot is a 1932 British crime film directed by John Daumery and starring Percy Marmont, Muriel Angelus and Warwick Ward. It was It was written by Roland Pertwee and John Hastings Turner and made as a quota quickie at Teddington Studios by the British subsidiary of Warner Brothers.

== Preservation status ==
The British Film Institute National Archive holds a collection of stills but no film or video materials.

== Plot ==
Gentleman crook Holland Janney's daughter Marilyn marries young lawyer Hugh Conway. When Conway is tasked with prosecuting Janney for bank robbery, Janney takes his own life to prevent his daughter finding out about his crimes.

== Cast ==
- Percy Marmont as Holland Janney
- Muriel Angelus as Marilyn Janney
- Warwick Ward as Hugh Conway
- Ivor Barnard as Mull
- Laura Cowie as Anne Wiltone
- Mary Jerrold as Mrs. Herriott
- George Merritt as Inspector Cadbury

== Reception ==
Film Weekly wrote: "Thin and obvious crook melodrama, laboriously overdrawn and stiffly acted. Better direction, imparting pace to the telling of the story and creating a climax, might have made reasonably good entertainment of the picture, but that has not been done."

Kine Weekly wrote: "A neat crook drama, with a Raffles theme, charged with appealing paternal sentiment. The development is inclined to be leisurely, and the characters are somewhat ' toney,' but popular drama evolves from the theme and the entertainment seldom flags."

Picture Show wrote: "Not too convincing, development on the slow side."
