= Change for a Sovereign =

1937 British film by Maurice Elvey

- Violet Farebrother and Seymour Hicks (right) in the film
- Directed by: Maurice Elvey
- Written by: Seymour Hicks
- Produced by: Irving Asher
- Starring: Seymour Hicks; Chili Bouchier; Bruce Lester
- Cinematography: Basil Emmott
- Production company: Warner Brothers
- Distributed by: Warner Brothers
- Release date: September 1937
- Running time: 72 minutes
- Country: United Kingdom
- Language: English

Change for a Sovereign is a 1937 British comedy film directed by Maurice Elvey and starring Seymour Hicks, Chili Bouchier and Bruce Lester. It was written by Hicks and made at Teddington Studios by the British subsidiary of Warner Brothers.

== Preservation status ==
The British Film Institute National Archive holds a collection of ephemera and stills but no film or video materials.

== Plot ==
King Hugo of Gallancia has been overdoing things and decides he needs a holiday. To maintain appearances in his absence, a stand-in is found who is so like Hugo that even the Queen is taken in. Huge and his family set off on their holiday but the KIng's double turns out to be a drunkard woman-chaser.

== Cast ==
- Seymour Hicks as King Hugo
- Chili Bouchier as Countess Rita
- Bruce Lester as Prince William
- Violet Farebrother as Queen Agatha
- Aubrey Mallalieu as Baron Breit
- Ralph Truman as Archduke Paul
- Wilfrid Hyde-White as Charles
- C. Denier Warren as Mr. Heller
- Florence Vie as Mrs. Heller
- Daphne Raglan as Katrina Heller

== Reception ==
The Monthly Film Bulletin wrote: "This naive and fantastic story is completely unconvincing, and no visible attempt has been made to make it otherwise. It seems to be little more than an excuse to give Sir Seymour Hicks the opportunity of playing a dual role. This he does extremely well, being funnier as the drunken double, but quite amusing as the bored monarch. The remaining actors and actresses have little scope. The situations notably that of the conspiracy are ridiculous, and the dialogue is inept."

Kine Weekly wrote: "Picture starts on a note of satire, but is developed on the lines of broad comedy, with the humour arising mainly from incident of monarch masquerade and homely domestic life of Royal Family."
