= High Finance (film) =

1933 film

- Trade show advertisement
- Directed by: George King
- Produced by: Irving Asher
- Starring: Gibb McLaughlin; Ida Lupino
- Cinematography: Basil Emmott
- Distributed by: Warner Brothers-First National Productions
- Release date: 1933
- Running time: 67 minutes
- Country: United Kingdom
- Language: English

High Finance is a 1933 British drama film directed by George King and starring Gibb McLaughlin and Ida Lupino. It was marketed as "the drama of a man overwhelmed by his own success".

== Preservation status ==
The British Film Institute has classed High Finance as a lost film. Its National Archive holds no film or video materials.

== Plot ==
Self-made businessman Sir Grant Rayburn is obsessed with making money to the exclusion of all else. He shows little interest in his daughter Jill and is irritated when she falls in love with, and wishes to marry, a young man named Tom. Sir Grant does not believe Tom is a suitable match for Jill as he does not come from a moneyed background. He suspects that Tom is a chancer with an eye on access to Jill's money, and as she is still under age he refuses to give her consent to marry and considers the matter closed, with no concern for Jill's feelings.

Sir Grant discovers what he believes to be a quick and easy way to make a financial killing, and goes full steam ahead with the scheme in the face of concern from his advisers that it is risky in the extreme, and potentially illegal. The scheme ends in disaster, with Sir Grant publicly exposed as a law-breaker and sentenced to a term of imprisonment. While behind bars he has time to reflect on his mistakes, and realises that he has allowed greed and selfishness to control his life. He emerges from prison a reformed character, vowing to pay more attention to personal matters and less to business. He apologises to Jill for his neglect and unreasonableness, saying that he has judged Tom unfairly and he is now happy to allow them to marry.

== Cast ==
- Gibb McLaughlin as Sir Grant Rayburn
- Ida Lupino as Jill Rayburn
- John Batten as Tom
- Abraham Sofaer as Myers
- D. A. Clarke-Smith as Dodman
- John H. Roberts as Ladcock

== Production ==
It was produced and distributed by Warner Bros., and shot at Teddington Studios as a quota quickie.

== Reception ==
Kine Weekly wrote: "There is a lesson to this drama, and had it been treated with imagination and allowed to unfold with more logic it could have grown into first-class entertainment. As it is, it seldom escapes from the shackles of the novelette."

The Daily Film Renter wrote: "Straightforward direction presents action with occasional over-emphasis, while overplus of stilted dialogue militates against conviction. Bright spots include excellent work by Ida Lupino as heroine, good photography, and pleasant backgrounds. Cutting would improve. Should get by with popular halls. ... There is rather too much dialogue of a banal type, which holds the action up from time to time."

Picturegoer wrote: "The development is stilted and the dialogue too full of platitudes to make any real impression, although the moral it seeks to impress is fairly well driven home. Gibb McLaughlin is not in his element as the financier and strikes a theatrical note, but Ida Lupino shows the ability that has earned her a Hollywood contract as his daughter."
