= Basil Emmott =

English cinematographer (1894–1976)

- Born: 5 July 1894; London, England
- Died: 23 January 1976 (aged 81); Eastbourne, East Sussex, England
- Occupation: Cinematographer
- Years active: 1921–1965

Basil Emmott, BSC (5 July 1894 – 23 January 1976) was a prolific English cinematographer with 190 films to his credit, active from the 1920s to the 1960s. Emmott's career started in the silent era and continued through to the mid-1960s. His most prolific decade was the 1930s, when he was involved with almost 120 films, many of which were produced by noted documentary film-maker John Grierson.

Emmott worked mainly in the field of quota quickies and B-movies. His output covered the entire spectrum of film genres, from comedy and musicals, through melodrama and thrillers, to crime and horror films. Directors Emmott worked with included Michael Powell, Arthur B. Woods, Val Guest and Lance Comfort.

== Selected filmography (cinematographer) ==
- Branded (1920)
- Rob Roy (1922)
- Young Lochinvar (1923)
- Reveille (1924)
- Quinneys (1927)
- The Glad Eye (1927)
- The Flight Commander (1927)
- Sailors Don't Care (1928)
- The Feather (1929)
- To What Red Hell (1929)
- The Co-Optimists (1929)
- Spanish Eyes (1930)
- Kissing Cup's Race (1930)
- Big Business (1930)
- The Mystery of the Villa Rose (1930)
- The Great Game (1930)
- The Rosary (1931)
- Chin Chin Chinaman (1931)
- The Officers' Mess (1931)
- When London Sleeps (1932)
- Collision (1932)
- Blind Spot (1932)
- Her Night Out (1932)
- Don't Be a Dummy (1932)
- The Marriage Bond (1932)
- Murder on the Second Floor (1932)
- In a Monastery Garden (1932)
- Frail Women (1932)
- The Missing Rembrandt (1932)
- The Lodger (1932)
- The Stolen Necklace (1933)
- This Acting Business (1933)
- Little Fella (1933)
- Head of the Family (1933)
- Mr. Quincey of Monte Carlo (1933)
- Double Wedding (1933)
- Enemy of the Police (1933)
- Call Me Mame (1933)
- The Melody-Maker (1933)
- Out of the Past (1933)
- Too Many Wives (1933)
- Mayfair Girl (1933)
- Going Straight (1933)
- Smithy (1933)
- The Bermondsey Kid (1933)
- As Good as New (1933)
- Little Miss Nobody (1933)
- High Finance (1933)
- Her Imaginary Lover (1933)
- Guest of Honour (1934)
- What Happened to Harkness? (1934)
- The Life of the Party (1934)
- The Church Mouse (1934)
- A Glimpse of Paradise (1934)
- Father and Son (1934)
- Nine Forty-Five (1934)
- No Escape (1934)
- The Office Wife (1934)
- Leave It to Blanche (1934)
- What's in a Name? (1934)
- Murder at the Inn (1934)
- The Girl in Possession (1934)
- Something Always Happens (1934)
- Big Business (1934)
- The Blue Squadron (1934)
- Trouble in Store (1934)
- Hello, Sweetheart (1935)
- Murder at Monte Carlo (1935)
- The Girl in the Crowd (1935)
- Falling in Love (1935)
- Man of the Moment (1935)
- Crime Unlimited (1935)
- The Black Mask (1935)
- Someday (1935)
- Get Off My Foot (1935)
- Widow's Might (1935)
- Faithful (1936)
- The Brown Wallet (1936)
- Fair Exchange (1936)
- It's in the Bag (1936)
- Educated Evans (1936)
- Crown v. Stevens (1936)
- Gaol Break (1936)
- Where's Sally? (1936)
- Twelve Good Men (1936)
- Hail and Farewell (1936)
- Irish for Luck (1936)
- The Compulsory Wife (1937)
- Don't Get Me Wrong (1937)
- Mayfair Melody (1937)
- Change for a Sovereign (1937)
- Ship's Concert (1937)
- Gypsy (1937)
- The Vulture (1937)
- It's Not Cricket (1937)
- The Perfect Crime (1937)
- You Live and Learn (1937)
- The Singing Cop (1938)
- Thank Evans (1938)
- Thistledown (1938)
- The Viper (1938)
- Dangerous Medicine (1938)
- Glamour Girl (1938)
- The Return of Carol Deane (1938)
- Double or Quits (1938)
- They Drive by Night (1938)
- Everything Happens to Me (1938)
- It's in the Blood (1938)
- Many Tanks Mr. Atkins (1938)
- Quiet Please (1938)
- Too Dangerous to Live (1939)
- The Midas Touch (1940)
- The Good Old Days (1940)
- Hoots Mon! (1940)
- Dr. O'Dowd (1940)
- The Briggs Family (1940)
- His Brother's Keeper (1940)
- That's the Ticket (1940)
- Two for Danger (1940)
- The Seventh Survivor (1941)
- The Prime Minister (1941)
- Atlantic Ferry (1941)
- The Peterville Diamond (1942)
- Flying Fortress (1942)
- Miss London Ltd. (1943)
- Time Flies (1944)
- It Happened One Sunday (1944)
- The Man from Morocco (1945)
- Master of Bankdam (1947)
- Brass Monkey (1948)
- Paper Orchid (1949)
- Companions in Crime (1954)
- The Green Carnation (1954)
- Where There's a Will (1955)
- Track the Man Down (1955)
- Secret Venture (1955)
- Johnny, You're Wanted (1956)
- Soho Incident (aka Spin a Dark Web) (1956)
- Wicked As They Come (1956)
- Home and Away (1956)
- Town on Trial (1957)
- The Long Haul (1957)
- Battle of the V-1 (1958)
- I Was Monty's Double (1958)
- Touch of Death (1961)
- Rag Doll (1961)
- The Wind of Change (1961)
- The Breaking Point (1961)
- Pit of Darkness (1961)
- The Painted Smile (1962)
- Strongroom (1962)
- Blind Corner (1963)
- Live It Up! (1963)
- Tomorrow at Ten (1964)
- Be My Guest (1965)
- Curse of the Fly (1965)
