= Her Imaginary Lover =

1933 film

- Trade advertisement
- Directed by: George King
- Written by: Randall Faye
- Based on: Green Stockings by A. E. W. Mason
- Produced by: Irving Asher
- Starring: Laura La Plante; Percy Marmont; Olive Blakeney
- Cinematography: Basil Emmott
- Distributed by: Warner Brothers-First National Productions
- Release date: 1933
- Running time: 66 minutes
- Country: United Kingdom
- Language: English

Her Imaginary Lover is a 1933 British comedy film directed by George King and starring Laura La Plante and Percy Marmont. It was written by Randall Faye based on the play Green Stockings by A. E. W. Mason, produced and distributed by Warner Brothers, and shot at the company's Teddington Studios as a quota quickie.

== Plot ==
New York socialite Celia invents an aristocratic English fiancé named Lord Michael Ware to deflect the tedious attention of would-be suitors. Celia travels to London to claim an inheritance and meets an aristocratic Englishman called Lord Michael Ware. The imaginary romance becomes real.

== Cast ==
- Laura La Plante as Celia
- Percy Marmont as Lord Michael Ware
- Bernard Nedell as Davidson
- Olive Blakeney as Polly
- Roland Culver as Raleigh Raleigh
- Lady Tree as Grandma
- Emily Fitzroy as Aunt Lydia

== Reception ==
The Daily Film Renter wrote: "Direction lacks pace, but Laura la Plante is attractive in lead, with Lady Tree scoring heavily as comedy grandmother. Passable light entertainment for smaller popular halls."

Kine Weekly wrote: "Laura la Plante is a spirited and likeable Celia. Lady Tree is excellent as Grandma, Emily Fitzroy is good as Aunt Lydia, Roland Culver is effective as the sly Raleigh, and Percy Marmont, always the little gentleman, is adequate as Lord Michael. Although this is typical stage farce, quite a good amount of tun is extracted trom the plot. The team work is admirable, and the direction displays sufficient imagination to allow the gags to follow through and cloak the obvious."

Picturegoer wrote: "Laura La Plante shows a good deal of her old spirit as the heroine, while Lady Tree is excellent as her grandmother who instigates the plot. Percy Marmont is adequate as the nobleman whose name has been taken in vain."

== Preservation ==
The British Film Institute has classed Her Imaginary Lover as a lost film. Its National Archive holds a collection of stills but no film or video materials.
