= Irish for Luck =

1936 film by Arthur B. Woods

- Directed by: Arthur B. Woods
- Written by: L.A.G. Strong (novel); Brock Williams; Arthur B. Woods
- Produced by: Irving Asher
- Starring: Athene Seyler; Margaret Lockwood; Patric Knowles; Gibb McLaughlin
- Cinematography: Basil Emmott
- Production company: Warner Brothers
- Distributed by: Warner Brothers (UK)
- Release date: December 1936 (UK)
- Running time: 68 minutes
- Country: United Kingdom
- Language: English

Irish for Luck (also known as Meet the Duchess) is a lost 1936 British comedy film directed by Arthur B. Woods and starring Athene Seyler, Margaret Lockwood and Patric Knowles. It was written by Brock Williams and Arthur B. Woods adapted from a novel by L.A.G. Strong, and made at Teddington Studios by the British subsidiary of Warner Brothers. The film is about an impoverished Irish Duchess who tries to survive on her small income.

== Preservation status ==
The British Film Institute has classed Irish for Luck as a lost film. Its National Archive holds a collection of ephemera but no stills, film or video materials.

== Plot ==
Ellen O'Hare leaves Ireland and her penniless duchess aunt to pursue a singing career in England. She encounters street musician Terry and they eventually return without success to Ireland, to discover Ellen's aunt is now prosperous.

== Cast ==
- Athene Seyler as The Duchess
- Margaret Lockwood as Ellen O'Hare
- Patric Knowles as Terry O'Ryan
- Gibb McLaughlin as Thady
- Edward Rigby as Hon. Denis Maguire
- Eugene Leahy as O'Callaghan
- George Dillon as Mooney
- Terry Conlin as Costello

== Reception ==
The Monthly Film Bulletin wrote: "This unpretentious film achieves much more than many more ambitious ones. The dialogue makes full use of Irish witticism. The acting is delightful and the atmosphere authentic. Gibb McLaughlin as the family retainer is superb."

Kine Weekly wrote: "Refreshing Irish character comedy, lightly but securely based on the eccentricities of the brisk temperament. The clean-cut story, happy in its culminating twists, has the additional advantage of a versatile and attractive cast. Athene Seyler distinguishes herself in the lead, and on top of this there is resourceful direction, appropriate backgrounds, and a captivating musical score. A picture of many diverting moods, the film is one particularly suited to the tastes of family audiences as well as the masses."

The Daily Film Renter wrote: "This slender plot is rather loosely knit, with the result audience attention is never really gripped. There is, too, an overplus of dialogue, most of which is put over in conflicting brogues – when the players remember they are supposed to be Irish. On the credit side there is some pleasant romantic content, the old lady's niece falling in love with a street singer, while the B.B.C. comes in for a spot of gentle satire at times. ... Patric Knowles and Margaret Lockwood sustain the romantic department, and Gibb McLaughlin renders sterling support as an old family retainer."

Picturegoer wrote: "There is a touch of theatricality about the proceedings, but the Irish atmosphere has been well caught and the twists and plot are always amusing."

Picture Show wrote: "There is a refreshing charm about this Irish comedy. ... Athene Seyler gives a delightful comedy performance as the Duchess, and the supporting cast is headed by Margaret Lockwood and Patric Knowles, who are charming as the lovers. The Irish atmosphere is excellently conveyed, settings are well done, and the direction is deft."
