= Big Business (1934 film) =

1934 British film by Cyril Gardner

- Directed by: Cyril Gardner
- Written by: Claude Hulbert; Cyril Gardner
- Produced by: Irving Asher
- Starring: Claude Hulbert; Eve Gray; Ernest Sefton; Hal Walters
- Cinematography: Basil Emmott
- Production company: Warner Brothers
- Distributed by: Warner Brothers
- Release date: October 1934
- Running time: 53 minutes
- Country: United Kingdom
- Language: English

Big Business is a 1934 British comedy film directed by Cyril Gardner and starring Claude Hulbert, Eve Gray and Ernest Sefton. It was made at Teddington Studios as a quota quickie by the British subsidiary of Warner Brothers. It is notably the second film of the same name that James Finlayson starred in.

== Plot summary ==
Two sets of twins are mixed up at birth, leading to an identity crisis at the Plaza Hotel later in life.

== Cast ==
- Claude Hulbert as Reggie Pullett / Shayne Carter
- Eve Gray as Sylvia Brent
- Ernest Sefton as Mac
- James Finlayson as P.C.
- Hal Walters as Spike
- Maude Zimbla as Nina

== Bibliography ==
- Wood, Linda. British Films, 1927–1939. British Film Institute, 1986.
