= Aubrey Dexter =

British actor (1898–1958)

- Born: 29 March 1898; London, England, United Kingdom
- Died: 2 May 1958 (aged 60); Cape Town, South Africa
- Other name: Douglas Peter Jonas
- Occupations: Film actor Stage actor
- Years active: 1928–1957

Aubrey Dexter (29 March 1898 – 2 May 1958) was a British stage and film actor.

== Partial filmography ==
- East of Shanghai (1931) – Colonel (uncredited)
- Loyalties (1933) – Kentman (uncredited)
- Out of the Past (1933) – David Mannering
- The Love Test (1935) – Vice-president
- Cross Currents (1935) – Colonel Bagge-Grant
- The Private Secretary (1935) – Gibson
- Whom the Gods Love (1936) – Minor Role (uncredited)
- It's in the Bag (1936) – Peters
- Please Teacher (1937) – Reeves
- The Show Goes On (1937)
- Sixty Glorious Years (1938) – Prince of Wales
- Young Man's Fancy (1939) – Soames
- His Brother's Keeper (1940) – Sylvester
- Gaslight (1940) – House Agent
- Old Mother Riley in Society (1940) – Nugent
- The House of the Arrow (1940) – Giradot
- Saloon Bar (1940) – Major
- London Belongs to Me (1948) – Mr. Battlebury
- Room to Let (1950) – Harding
- Night and the City (1950) – Fergus Chilk, Kristo's Lawyer (uncredited)
- Stars in Your Eyes (1956) – Farrow
- The Counterfeit Plan (1957) – Joe Lepton
- The Prince and the Showgirl (1957) – The Ambassador (final film role)

== Bibliography ==
- Low, Rachael. History of the British Film: Filmmaking in 1930s Britain. George Allen & Unwin, 1985 .
