= Enemy of the Police =

1933 British comedy film

- Violet Farebrother, John Stuart, Hal Walters and Ernest Sefton in the film.
- Directed by: George King
- Produced by: Irving Asher
- Starring: John Stuart; Viola Keats; A. Bromley Davenport
- Cinematography: Basil Emmott
- Production company: Warner Brothers
- Distributed by: Warner Brothers
- Release date: October 1933
- Running time: 51 minutes
- Country: United Kingdom
- Language: English

Enemy of the Police is a 1933 British comedy film directed by George King and starring John Stuart, Viola Keats and A. Bromley Davenport. It was made at Teddington Studios as a quota quickie by Warner Brothers.

== Preservation status ==
The British Film Institute National Archive holds a collection of stills but no film or video materials.

== Plot ==
John Meakin is the meek secretary of a social reform society. He gets caught up in a police chase and ends up handcuffed to one of the criminals, instructed by the police to guard him. The villain takes himself and Meakin to an accomplice who has a key, leaving John on his own, still wearing the handcuffs. He visits criminal reformer Lady Salterton, who removes the cuffs, and discovers that her servants are planning to do her in, but he foils their plans.

== Cast ==
- John Stuart as John Meakin
- Viola Keats as Preston
- A. Bromley Davenport as Sir Lemuel Tapleigh
- Margaret Yarde as Lady Tapleigh
- Violet Farebrother as Lady Salterton
- Ernest Sefton as Slingsby
- Winifred Oughton as Martha Teavle
- Alf Goddard as Gallagher
- Molly Fisher as Ann
- Hal Walters as Bagshaw

== Reception ==
Kine Weekly wrote: "Thin comedy's many hackneyed situations carried to length. There is, however, a popular and capable cast who do their best to overcome the story's limitations. Quota booking for the uncritical. ... The weak story does not provide the players with many opportunities of displaying their talent, but they make the most of the material at their command. The direction carries most of the situations to excessive length and the humour becomes forced."

The Daily Film Renter wrote: "Little imagination has been used in the direction, and definite improvements could be effected by cutting. The acting of John Stuart, as the reform secretary, is very stagy, and he is given little help by the supporting cast."

Picture Show wrote: "John Stuart essays a comedy role in this film, disguised in spectacles and a harassed expression. ... A slow and frankly impossible story, the acting does little to help the film."
