= Cyril Gardner =

American actor (1898–1942)

Cyril Gardner (30 May 1898 – 30 December 1942) was a French-born American actor, film director, editor and screenwriter.

Gardner was born Cyril Gottlieb in Paris, France in 1898 and emigrated to the United States at an early age, where he changed his surname to 'Gardner'. He began his career as a child actor, most notably in a starring role in the 1913 Thomas H. Ince-directed Cilvil War drama The Drummer of the 8th, opposite child star Mildred Harris.

== Selected filmography ==
=== Director ===
- Declassee (1925) editor
- The Trespasser (1929) editor
- Grumpy (1930)
- The Royal Family of Broadway (1930)
- Reckless Living (1931)
- Doomed Battalion (1932)
- Perfect Understanding (1933)
- Big Business (1934)
- Widow's Might (1935)

=== Screenwriter ===
- Chick (1936)

=== Editor ===
- Prisoners of the Pines (1918)
- Whispers (1920)
