= Evelyn Roberts =

British actor (1886–1962)

- in Man of the Moment (1955)
- Born: Evelyn Ronald Redvers Roberts; 28 August 1886; Reading, Berkshire, England, UK
- Died: 30 November 1962 (aged 76); Tunbridge Wells, Kent, England, UK
- Occupation: Actor
- Years active: 1918-1958
- Spouse: Daisy Cordell (m. 1921; died 1959)

Evelyn Roberts (28 August 1886 – 30 November 1962) was an English stage and film actor. He made his stage debut in 1918 after serving in WW I; and his theatre work included the original Broadway production of R.C. Sherriff's Journey's End in 1929-1930.

== Selected filmography ==
- Bolibar (1928)
- Say It with Music (1932)
- One Precious Year (1933)
- The Melody-Maker (1933)
- Anne One Hundred (1933)
- Purse Strings (1933)
- Sorrell and Son (1934)
- The Broken Rosary (1934)
- Sing As We Go (1934)
- The Feathered Serpent (1934)
- No Limit (1935)
- A Romance in Flanders (1937)
- Keep Fit (1937)
- Return of the Scarlet Pimpernel (1937)
- I've Got a Horse (1938)
- The Second Mr. Bush (1940)
- The Midas Touch (1940)
- The Winslow Boy (1948)
- The Heart of the Matter (1953)
- The Clue of the Missing Ape (1953)
- The Green Scarf (1954)
- Man of the Moment (1955)
- A Touch of the Sun (1956)
- The Spaniard's Curse (1958)
