= As Good as New (film) =

1933 British film by Graham Cutts

- Directed by: Graham Cutts
- Written by: Thompson Buchanan (play); Randall Faye
- Produced by: Irving Asher
- Starring: Winna Winifried; John Batten; Sunday Wilshin
- Cinematography: Basil Emmott
- Production company: Warner Brothers
- Distributed by: Warner Brothers
- Release date: 1933
- Running time: 48 minutes
- Country: United Kingdom
- Language: English

As Good As New is 1933 British drama film directed by Graham Cutts and starring Winna Winifried, John Batten and Sunday Wilshin. It was based on a play by Thompson Buchanan. It was made at Teddington Studios. It was a quota quickie made by the British branch of Warner Brothers.

== Premise ==
A woman, disappointed in love, becomes increasingly cynical and attempts to marry a wealthy man.

== Partial cast ==
- Winna Winifried as Elsa
- John Batten as Tom
- Sunday Wilshin as Rosa
- Toni Edgar-Bruce as Nurse Adams

== Bibliography ==
- Low, Rachel. The History of British Film: Volume VII. Routledge, 1997.
