= Out of the Past (1933 film) =

1933 film by Leslie S. Hiscott

- Lester Matthews, Henry Mollison and Joan Marion in the film
- Directed by: Leslie S. Hiscott
- Produced by: Irving Asher
- Starring: Lester Matthews; Joan Marion; Jack Raine
- Cinematography: Basil Emmott
- Production company: Warner Brothers
- Distributed by: Warner Brothers
- Release date: 1933
- Running time: 51 minutes
- Country: United Kingdom
- Language: English

Out of the Past is a 1933 British crime film directed by Leslie S. Hiscott and starring Lester Matthews, Joan Marion and Jack Raine. It was made as a quota quickie at Teddington Studios.

== Preservation status ==
The British Film Institute National Archive holds a collection of stills but no film or video materials.

== Plot ==
Frances Dayton, a starving young woman, is rescued from a suicide attempt in the Thames by a solicitor who plans to use her as a co-respondent in a divorce case for his client, Captain Leslie Fairbrother. Many years later, Frances is now managing director at a London department store. On the verge of marrying her employer’s son, she is called upon to cast a vote regarding the funding of a large exploration scheme. Believing the project financially unsound, she votes against it. This prompts Eric Cotton, a suave crook, to threaten her with exposure of her past life. Rather than allow her firm to suffer a heavy financial loss, Frances refuses to be coerced. Seeking revenge, Cotton alerts the King's Proctor to investigate her past role in the Fairbrother divorce. However, Frances manages to block his move with a piece of shrewd lying. In the end, she finds happiness in the arms of the captain.

== Cast ==
- Lester Matthews as Captain Leslie Fairbrother
- Joan Marion as Frances Dane
- Jack Raine as Eric Cotton
- Henry Mollison as Gerald Brassard
- Eric Stanley as Sir John Brassard
- Margaret Damer as Lady Brassard
- Aubrey Dexter as David Mannering
- Wilfred Shine as Richard Travers

== Reception ==
Kine Weekly wrote: "The story has some claim to ingenuity, and is all the more holding and interesting for being allowed to run to its logical conclusion. Strong drama and tender romance walk hand in hand, and unpretentious but adequate backgrounds supply good atmosphere."

The Daily Film Renter wrote: "Unconvincing drama ... Jerky continuity, indifferent direction and poor characterisation militate against acceptability of feature except by very uncritical audiences. ... Not for a single moment does this artificial narrative convince us."

Picturegoer wrote: "Simple, straightforward story which is quite well told and contains some sound, strong drama as well as its romantic element. Joan Marion's performance ... is promising. Her emotional acting is good, and she should go far."
