= Lester Matthews =

English actor (1900–1975)

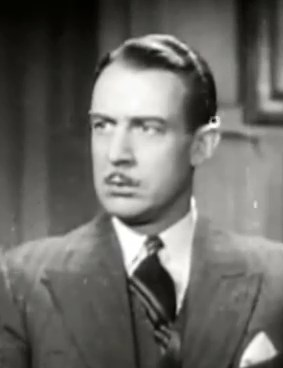
- Matthews in Werewolf of London (1935)
- Born: Arthur Lester Matthews; 6 June 1900; Nottingham, Nottinghamshire, England
- Died: 5 June 1975 (aged 74); Los Angeles, California, U.S.
- Occupation: Film actor
- Years active: 1931–1974
- Spouse(s): Frances Walper; Anne Grey (1931–1938) (divorced)

Arthur Lester Matthews (6 June 1900 – 5 June 1975) was an English actor.

== Career ==
In his career, he made more than 180 appearances in film and on television. He was erroneously credited in later years as Les Matthews. Matthews played supporting roles in films like The Raven and Werewolf of London (both 1935), but his career deteriorated into bit parts.

== Death ==
He died on 5 June 1975, the day before his 75th birthday, in Los Angeles. His ashes were scattered into the Pacific Ocean.

== Partial filmography ==
- The Man at Six (1931) (also known as The Gables Mystery) – Campbell Edwards
- Creeping Shadows (1931) – Brian Nash
- The Old Man (1931) as Keith Keller
- Carmen (1931) – Zuniga
- The Wickham Mystery (1932) – Charles Wickham
- The Indiscretions of Eve (1932) – Ralph
- Fires of Fate (1932) – Lt. Col Egerton
- Her Night Out (1932) – Gerald Vickery
- She Was Only a Village Maiden (1933) – Frampton
- Called Back (1933) – Gilbert Vaughan
- The Melody-Maker (1933) – Tony Borrodaile
- On Secret Service (1933) – Coloneilo Romanelli
- The Stolen Necklace (1933) – Clive Wingate
- The Song You Gave Me (1933) – Max Winter
- The Poisoned Diamond (1933) – John Reader
- Out of the Past (1933) – Captain Leslie Farebrother
- House of Dreams (1933)
- Facing the Music (1933) – Becker
- Borrowed Clothes (1934) – Sir Harry Torrent
- Song at Eventide (1934) – Lord Belsize
- Blossom Time (1934) – Schwindt
- Irish Hearts (1934) – Dermot Fitzgerald
- Boomerang (1934) – David Kennedy
- Werewolf of London (1935) – Paul Ames
- The Raven (1935) – Dr. Jerry Halden (Credits) / Dr. Jerry Holden
- Professional Soldier (1935) – Prince Edric
- Song and Dance Man (1936) – C. B. Nelson
- Too Many Parents (1936) – Mark Stewart
- Thank You, Jeeves! (1936) – Elliott Manville
- Tugboat Princess (1936) – 1st Mate Bob
- 15 Maiden Lane (1936) – Gilbert Lockhart
- Lloyd's of London (1936) – Captain Hardy
- Crack-Up (1936) – Sidney Grant
- The Prince and the Pauper (1937) – St. John
- Lancer Spy (1937) – Capt. Neville
- There's Always a Woman (1938) – Walter Fraser
- The Adventures of Robin Hood (1938) – Sir Ivor
- Three Loves Has Nancy (1938) – Dr. Alonzo Z. Stewart
- Mysterious Mr. Moto (1938) – Sir Charles Murchison
- Time Out for Murder (1938) – Uncle Phillip Gregory
- If I Were King (1938) – General Saliere
- I Am a Criminal (1938) – District Attorney George Lane
- The Three Musketeers (1939) – Duke of Buckingham
- Should a Girl Marry? (1939) – Dr. White
- Susannah of the Mounties (1939) – Harlan Chambers
- Conspiracy (1939) – Gair – Henchman
- Rulers of the Sea (1939) – Lieut. Roberts
- British Intelligence (1939) – Henry Thompson (uncredited)
- Northwest Passage (1940) – Sam Livermore
- Gaucho Serenade (1940) – Frederick Willoughby
- The Biscuit Eater (1940) – Mr. Ames
- Women in War (1940) – Sir Humphrey, Prosecuting attorney
- The Sea Hawk (1940) – Guard Officer (uncredited)
- Sing, Dance, Plenty Hot (1940) – Scott
- The Lone Wolf Keeps a Date (1940) – Mr. Lee
- Scotland Yard (1941) – Dr. Gilbert (uncredited)
- Man Hunt (1941) – Major
- Life Begins for Andy Hardy (1941) – Mr. Eric J. Maddox (uncredited)
- A Yank in the R.A.F. (1941) – Group Captain
- Son of Fury: The Story of Benjamin Blake (1942) – Prosecutor
- Born to Sing (1942) – Arthur Cartwright
- Sunday Punch (1942) – Smith, Judy's Date (uncredited)
- The Pied Piper (1942) – Mr. Cavanaugh
- Across the Pacific (1942) – Canadian Major
- Manila Calling (1942) – Wayne Ralston
- Desperate Journey (1942) – Wing Commander
- Now, Voyager (1942) – Captain (uncredited)
- London Blackout Murders (1943) – Oliver Madison
- The Mysterious Doctor (1943) – Dr. Frederick Holmes
- Tonight We Raid Calais (1943) – English Maj. West (uncredited)
- Two Tickets to London (1943) – Treathcote (uncredited)
- Appointment in Berlin (1943) – Air Marshal (uncredited)
- Corvette K-225 (1943) – British Captain (uncredited)
- Nine Girls (1944) – Horace Canfield
- Four Jills in a Jeep (1944) – Capt. Lloyd (uncredited)
- The Story of Dr. Wassell (1944) – Dr. Ralph Wayne (uncredited)
- Between Two Worlds (1944) – Steamship Dispatcher (uncredited)
- The Invisible Man's Revenge (1944) – Sir Jasper Herrick
- Shadows in the Night (1944) – Stanley Carter
- Ministry of Fear (1944) – Dr. Norton at Lembridge Asylum (uncredited)
- Jungle Queen (1945) – Commissioner Braham Chatterton
- I Love a Mystery (1945) – Justin Reeves / Mr. G
- Objective, Burma! (1945) – British Maj. Fitzpatrick (uncredited)
- Salty O'Rourke (1945) – Salesman
- Two O'Clock Courage (1945) – Mark Evans
- Son of Lassie (1945) – Major Elliston (uncredited)
- The Beautiful Cheat (1945) – Farley
- Monsieur Verdoux (1947) – Prosecutor (uncredited)
- Bulldog Drummond at Bay (1947) – Shannon Eskdale
- Banjo (1947) – Gerald Warren (uncredited)
- Dark Delusion (1947) – Wyndham Grace
- The Exile (1947) – Robbins
- The Paradine Case (1947) – Police Inspector Ambrose (uncredited)
- Fighting Father Dunne (1948) – Archbishop John Joseph Glennon
- Addio Mimí! (1949) – Fouquet
- The Woman on Pier 13 (1949) – Dr. Dixon (uncredited)
- Free for All (1949) – Mr. Aberson
- Malaya (1949) – Matisson (scenes deleted)
- Montana (1950) – George Forsythe
- Tyrant of the Sea (1950) – Adm. Lord Horatio Nelson
- Rogues of Sherwood Forest (1950) – Alan-a-Dale
- Tales of Robin Hood (1951) – Sir Hugh Fitzwalter
- Lorna Doone (1951) – King Charles II
- Dick Turpin's Ride (1951) – Ridgely – Joyce's Interrogator (uncredited)
- Corky of Gasoline Alley (1951) – Ellis (uncredited)
- The Desert Fox: The Story of Rommel (1951) – British Officer (uncredited)
- Anne of the Indies (1951) – Wherryman (uncredited)
- The Son of Dr. Jekyll (1951) – Sir John Utterson
- 5 Fingers (1952) – Undersecretary (uncredited)
- Jungle Jim in the Forbidden Land (1952) – Commissioner Kingston
- The Brigand (1952) – Dr. Lopez
- Lady in the Iron Mask (1952) – Prime Minister Rochard
- Les Misérables (1952) – Mentou Sr. (uncredited)
- Captain Pirate (1952) – Col. Ramsey
- Operation Secret (1952) – Robbins
- Against All Flags (1952) – Sir Cloudsley
- Stars and Stripes Forever (1952) – Mr. Pickering (uncredited)
- Niagara (1953) – Doctor (uncredited)
- Savage Mutiny (1953) – Major Walsh
- Man in the Attic (1953) – Chief Inspector Melville
- Rogue's March (1953) – Brigadier General
- Trouble Along the Way (1953) – Cardinal William Patrick O'Shea
- Jamaica Run (1953) – Judge
- Fort Ti (1953) – Lord Jeffrey Amherst (uncredited)
- The Desert Rats (1953) – Foreign Secretary (uncredited)
- Young Bess (1953) – Sir William Paget
- Sangaree (1953) – Gen. Victor Darby
- Man in the Attic (1953) – Chief Insp. Melville
- Bad for Each Other (1953) – Dr. Homer Gleeson
- Charge of the Lancers (1954) – Gen. Stanhope
- Jungle Man-Eaters (1954) – Comm. Kingston
- King Richard and the Crusaders (1954) – Archbishop of Tyre / Narrator
- Désirée (1954) – Caulaincourt (uncredited)
- Ten Wanted Men (1955) – Adan Stewart
- The Far Horizons (1955) – John Hancock
- The Seven Little Foys (1955) – Father O'Casey (uncredited)
- Moonfleet (1955) – Major Hennishaw
- Flame of the Islands (1956) – Gus
- Slander (1957) – Frank Grover (uncredited)
- Something of Value (1957) – Game Warden (uncredited)
- The Miracle (1959) – Capt.John Boulting
- Walk Like a Dragon (1960) – Peter Mott
- Song Without End (1960) – Emissary of the Grand Duchess (uncredited)
- The Young Savages (1961) – Dr. Androtti (uncredited)
- By Love Possessed (1961) – Man at Club (uncredited)
- The Beverly Hillbillies (1963) – Mr. Pendleton
- The Prize (1963) – BBC news Correspondent (uncredited)
- A Global Affair (1964) – British Delegate (uncredited)
- Mary Poppins (1964) – Mr. Tomes (uncredited)
- The Scorpio Letters (1967) – Mr. Harris
- Assault on a Queen (1966) – Doctor
- Star! (1968) – Lord Chamberlain (uncredited)
- Savage Intruder (1970) – Ira Jaffee
- Baby Needs a New Pair of Shoes (1974) – Mr. McDonald (final film role)
