= Ethel Irving =

British stage actress (1869–1963)

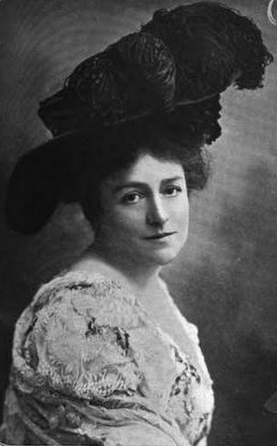
- Ethel Irving, from a 1907 publication
- Born: Frances Emily Irving; 5 September 1869; London, United Kingdom
- Died: 3 May 1963 (aged 93); Bexhill-on-Sea, East Sussex; United Kingdom
- Other names: Birdie Irving; Ethelyn Irving
- Occupation: Actress
- Spouse: Gilbert Porteous (died 1928)

Ethel Irving (born Frances Emily Irving; 1869–1963) was a British stage actress. She also appeared in five films.

== Biography ==
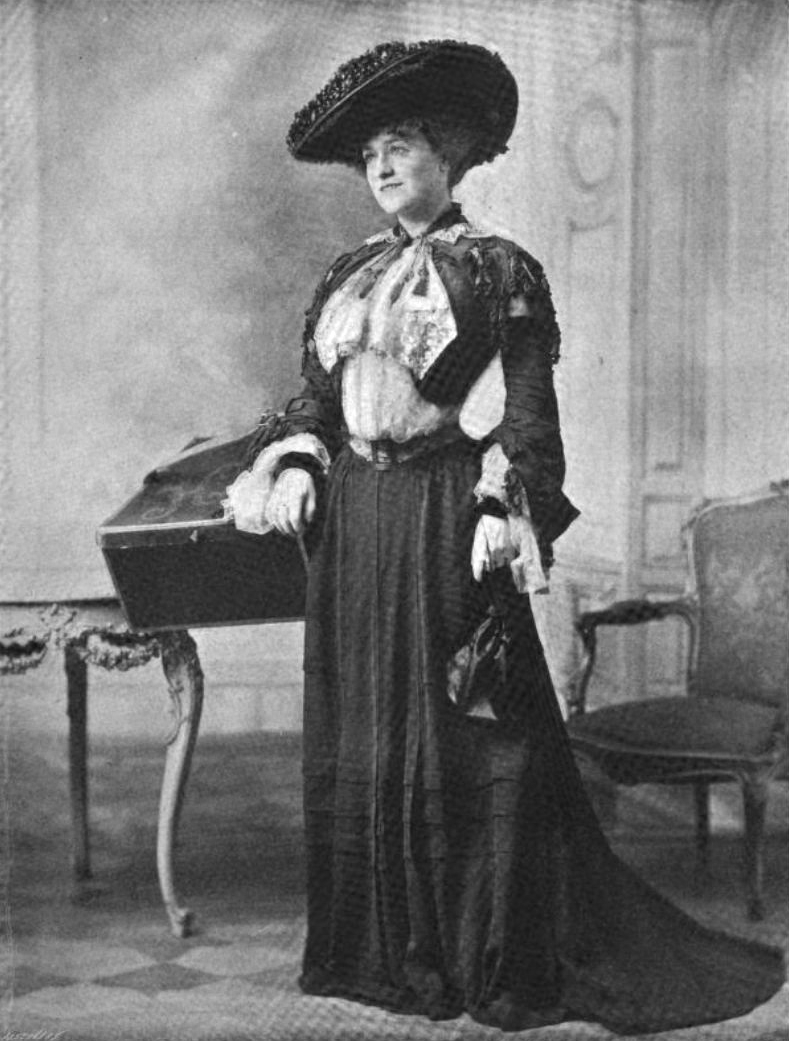
As Winnie Harborough in The Girl from Kays, 1902

Frances Emily Irving was born in England on 5 September 1869, the daughter of stage actor Joseph Irving (died 1870) and the wife of actor Gilbert Porteous (died 1928).

She was initially billed as Birdie Irving, appearing in London productions such as the 1885 pantomime A Frog He Would a Wooing Go and the burlesque The Vicar of Wideawakefield.

She died in Bexhill-on-Sea on 3 May 1963.

== Selected filmography ==
- Under Crimson Skies (1920)
- Michael O'Halloran (1923)
- A Peep Behind the Scenes (1929)
- Call Me Mame (1933)
