= This Acting Business =

1933 film

- Hugh Williams and Wendy Barrie in the film
- Directed by: John Daumery
- Produced by: Irving Asher
- Starring: Hugh Williams; Wendy Barrie; Donald Calthrop
- Cinematography: Basil Emmott
- Production company: Warner Brothers
- Distributed by: Warner Brothers
- Release date: 19 December 1933
- Running time: 54 minutes
- Country: United Kingdom
- Language: English

This Acting Business is a 1933 British comedy film directed by John Daumery and starring Hugh Williams, Wendy Barrie and Donald Calthrop. It was made at Teddington Studios as a quota quickie by the British subsidiary of Warner Brothers.

== Preservation status ==
The British Film Institute National Archive holds a collection of stills but no film or video materials.

== Plot ==
Matinee idol Hugh Kean marries prominent actress Joyce Stafford, and they star in a play that thrives on the publicity surrounding their marriage. Their parents, established Shakesperian actors, disapprove of the marriage and succeed in making them separate. The discovery that a baby is imminent brings them together again.

== Cast ==
- Hugh Williams as Hugh Kean
- Wendy Barrie as Joyce Stafford
- Donald Calthrop as Milton Stafford
- Violet Farebrother as Mary Kean
- Marie Wright as Mrs. Dooley
- Charles Paton as Ward

== Reception ==
Kine Weekly wrote: "Plot is not exciting, but it is quite well put over and, with the stars pertermances, provides a light quota offer above the average. Wendy Barrie as Joyce and Hugh Williams as Hugh speak well and are good without being outstanding."

The Daily Film Renter wrote: "Adequate direction secures fairly smooth flow of amusing comedy, spiced with piquant interludes of intermarital bickerings, involving wholesale destruction of gramophone records by newlyweds."

Picture Show wrote: "A pleasant, light little film ... There is perhaps a little too much talk and not enough action, but it detracts but little from the film,."
