= The Stolen Necklace =

1933 film by Leslie S. Hiscott

- Directed by: Leslie S. Hiscott
- Written by: Scott Darling
- Produced by: Irving Asher
- Starring: Lester Matthews; Joan Marion; Mickey Brantford
- Cinematography: Basil Emmott
- Production company: Warner Brothers
- Distributed by: Warner Brothers
- Release date: 1933
- Running time: 48 minutes
- Country: United Kingdom
- Language: English

The Stolen Necklace is a 1933 British crime film directed by Leslie S. Hiscott and starring Lester Matthews, Joan Marion and Mickey Brantford. It was written by Scott Darling and made as a quota quickie at Teddington Studios.

== Preservation status ==
The British Film Institute National Archive holds a collection of stills but no film or video materials.

== Cast ==
- Lester Matthews as Clive Wingate
- Joan Marion as Diana Hunter
- Mickey Brantford as Tom Hunter
- Wallace Lupino as sailor
- Dennis Wyndham as sailor
- Charles Farrell as sailor
- Victor Fairley as Colonel Hunter
- A. Bromley Davenport as priest

== Reception ==
Kine Weekly wrote: "This picture, which smacks of the potted serial, is full of loopholes which not even the good cast can conceal. Threads are picked up and dropped for no apparent reason, and it is left to fights and machine made thrills, not too accurately timed, to furnish a little excitement."

The Daily Film Renter wrote: "Action presents farrago of ludicrous plot and counter-plot, garnished with plentiful hurly-burly scrapping against sordid background of Wapping river-front. Indifferent photography and poor direction fail to invest improbable story with interest. Booking for juveniles and the unsophisticated."

Picturegoer wrote: "Theatrical and unconvincing melodrama of the potted serial variety, which is hardly to be taken seriously, so naive is it in story and execution. The cast is a talented one, but they can do little with their parts."
