= W. Scott Darling =

American film director and screenwriter (1898–1951)

William Scott Darling (May 28, 1898 – October 29, 1951) was a Canadian-born writer and a pioneer screenwriter and film director in the Hollywood motion picture industry.

== Biography ==
Born in Toronto, Ontario, Darling embarked on a career as a writer, primarily doing humor stories for magazines. He married Eleanor Fried, who later worked as a film editor, and they had a daughter, Gretchen (1915–1994), who became a stage actress and playwright.

In 1914, Darling was hired by the Kalem Company of New York City to work at their California studios writing the scripts for the adventure film serial The Hazards of Helen. So successful were the short films that the job would last more than two years with Darling writing 119 episodes of what became the longest serial ever made at 23.8 hours. When finished writing the exhausting serial he took a year off then in 1918 accepted an offer from fellow Ontarians Charles and Al Christie to write short comedy films for their Christie Film Company.

In 1921, Carl Laemmle at Universal Studios lured Darling away from Christie Films with the promise of an opportunity to direct in addition to writing screenplays. While adaptations from other works was Darling's forte, between 1922 and 1928 at Universal he directed 27 silent films and wrote 40 screenplays.

With the advent of sound film, he easily adapted to creating dialogue and wrote scripts for early "talkies" such as Fox's Trent's Last Case (1929) based on the E. C. Bentley novel and directed by Howard Hawks. Six years after directing his last silent film, Darling tried his hand at directing a sound film in the United Kingdom but was unable to devote the time necessary to attempt to develop the directorial skills required for the rapidly changing technology.

A prolific and diverse writer, during the 1930s and 1940s, Darling wrote more than seventy screenplays that were used for major films and popular B-movie thrillers produced by American studios in Hollywood as well as in London. Among these were Universal's The Ghost of Frankenstein (1942) and Sherlock Holmes and the Secret Weapon (1943) that received critical acclaim and were considerable box office successes. Darling also wrote four scripts at Twentieth Century Fox for their Laurel & Hardy productions .

In 1950 and '51, five more of Darling's scripts were made into films. After his death his final script, after 119 Hazards of Helen episodes and 167 other screenplays, was posthumously released on film in 1952.

=== Death ===
On October 29, 1951, Darling, whose wife had filed for divorce, failed to show up at the Los Angeles Domestic Relations Court. His wallet was found later that day floating in the ocean while his car was parked on the beach with the keys still in the ignition. The search for his body continued for several days.

== Selected filmography ==
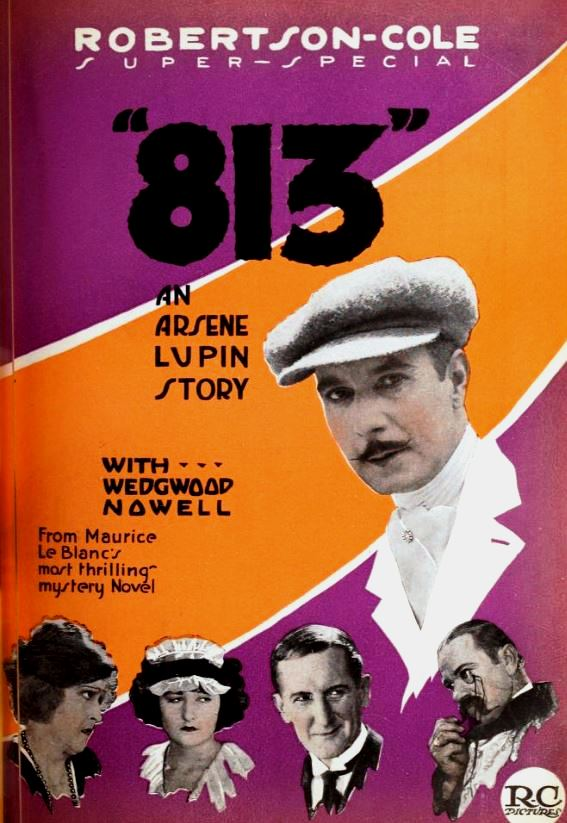
"813" film written by Scott Darling

- 813 (1920)
- See My Lawyer (1921)
- The Meddler (1925)
- His Last Haul (1928)
- Taxi 13 (1928)
- Noisy Neighbors (1929)
- Trent's Last Case (1929)
- Caught Cheating (1931)
- Murder at Midnight (1931)
- Dragnet Patrol (1931)
- Soul of the Slums (1931)
- The Pocatello Kid (1931)
- Two Gun Man (1931)
- High Society (1932)
- Dynamite Denny (1932)
- Her Night Out (1932)
- Outlaw Justice (1932)
- Little Fella (1933)
- The Stolen Necklace (1933)
- Too Many Wives (1933)
- No Escape (1934)
- Without You (1934)
- The Church Mouse (1934)
- Unknown Woman (1935)
- Boy of the Streets (1937)
- The Body Disappears (1941)
- The Ghost of Frankenstein (1942)
- Sin Town (1942)
- Sherlock Holmes and the Secret Weapon (1943)
- The Bullfighters (1945)
- Too Many Winners (1947)
- Louisiana (1947)
- Tuna Clipper (1949)
- Forgotten Women (1949)
- The Wolf Hunters (1949)
- County Fair (1950)
- Desert Pursuit (1952)
