= Murder at Monte Carlo =

1934 film

- Directed by: Ralph Ince
- Written by: Michael Barringer; John Hastings Turner
- Based on: novel by Tom Van Dycke
- Produced by: Irving Asher
- Starring: Errol Flynn
- Cinematography: Basil Emmott
- Production company: Warner Bros. First National
- Distributed by: Warner Bros.
- Release date: January 1935 (UK)
- Running time: 70 minutes
- Country: United Kingdom
- Language: English

Murder at Monte Carlo (also known as Murder in Monte Carlo) is a lost British 1934 mystery crime thriller film directed by Ralph Ince and starring Errol Flynn, Eve Gray, Paul Graetz and Molly Lamont. It was Flynn's debut in a lead role in England. The film was never released theatrically in the US.

== Plot ==
A Fleet Street reporter investigates the claim of Dr Becker, a professor of mathematics, to possess an infallible system of beating the roulette wheel at Monte Carlo. He refuses to take his fiancee Gilian along, but she decides to go anyway and report on the story for a rival paper. Dr Becker winds up dead and it looks like suicide, but Gilian is convinced it is murder. The finale involves Gilian getting all the suspects into one room and re-enacting the crime.

== Cast ==
- Errol Flynn as Dyter
- Eve Gray as Gilian
- Paul Graetz as Dr. Heinrich Becker
- Molly Lamont as Margaret Becker
- Ellis Irving as Marc Orton
- Laurence Hanray as Collum
- Henry Victor as Major
- Brian Buchel as Yates
- Peter Gawthorne as Duprez
- Gabriel Toyne as Wesley
- James Dale as Gustav
- Henry B. Longhurst as Editor
- Ernest Sefton as Sankey

== Production ==
The film was a "quota quickie" made by Warner Brothers at their Teddington Studios in Middlesex, on the edge of London. Flynn had been discovered by Irving Asher, the Managing Director of the studios, who put him under a seven-year option contract after cabling his head office in Hollywood: "He is the best picture bet we have ever seen. He is twenty-five, Irish, looks like a cross between Charles Farrell and George Brent, same type and build, excellent actor, champion boxer & swimmer, guarantee he's a real find". Before this, Flynn had appeared as an extra at the studios in the film I Adore You in 1933, and had then spent several months as an acting trainee with a repertory theatre company in Northampton, before returning to Teddington seeking a way to break into movie acting. The film was completed in November 1934 and Flynn left England for Hollywood soon afterwards.

According to Filmink magazine:

It was pretty impressive of Flynn to have bagged another movie lead but it must be remembered this was the era of wet fish British leading men – Barry Barnes, Leslie Banks, etc – and Flynn would have stood out among the alternatives on offer; he had the smooth appearance and cultured voice so beloved by British producers of the time, but he also had an athletic, virile appearance… Also, it was a cheap movie – they weren’t taking that much of a risk giving him a chance.

== Reception ==
Kine Weekly wrote: "Murder mystery drama the theme of which combines thrills, romance and humour with some ingenuity. Although dialogue predominates, loss of action is not sustained. Vital and alert characters, aided by good camera work, keep the pace and tension at a high level. The ending is rather obscure, but the dramatic, dexterous and unexpected methods of its presentation afford ample compensation. The film is definitely a cut above the usual quota product; it does, in fact, represent sound second-feature entertainment for the majority of halls."

The Daily Film Renter wrote: "Hardly lives up to promising opening, but nevertheless provides fair quota of entertainment, most of which springs from rivalry between Fleet Street man and girl in solving mystery. Well staged, replete with red-herring clues and surprise denouement. Competently acted by Eve Gray and Errol Flynn."

Picturegoer wrote: "Paul Graetz gives a clever character study as a mathematician who invents an infallible gambling system, but who is murdered before he can put it into practice at the tables. In fact, it is his presence that holds the picture together, and his disappearance in the latter scenes is a distinct loss. However, the solution of the murder, which is of the 'spot the culprit' order, is quite well worked up and holds the interest fairly well. There is a fair share of humour and suspense."

== Preservation status ==
The British Film Institute has classed Murder at Monte Carlo as a lost film, included in its "75 Most Wanted" list. The BFI National Archive holds a collection of stills but no film or video materials.

== See also ==
- List of lost films
