= Anne One Hundred =

1933 British film by Henry Edwards

- Gyles Isham and Betty Stockfeld in the film.
- Directed by: Henry Edwards
- Written by: Sewell Collins (play); Edgar Franklin (novel)
- Starring: Betty Stockfeld; Gyles Isham; Dennis Wyndham
- Production company: British and Dominions
- Distributed by: Paramount British Pictures
- Release date: June 1933
- Running time: 66 minutes
- Country: United Kingdom
- Language: English

Anne One Hundred is a 1933 British drama film directed by Henry Edwards and starring Betty Stockfeld, Gyles Isham and Dennis Wyndham. It was based on the play Anne One Hundred Percent by Sewell Collins, and the novel Rescuing Anne by Edgar Franklin and was made at British and Dominion's Elstree Studios as a quota quickie.

== Preservation status ==
The British Film Institute National Archive holds a collection of ephemera and stills but no film or video materials.

== Premise ==
A young woman inherits a soap factory from her father, and struggles to keep it open.

== Cast ==
- Betty Stockfeld as Anne Briston
- Gyles Isham as Nixon
- Dennis Wyndham as March
- Evelyn Roberts as Burton Fraim
- Allan Jeayes as Penvale
- Eric Hales as Masters
- Quentin McPhearson as Mole
- Phyllis Calvert

== Reception ==
Kine Weekly wrote: "Simple naive romance of big business, obvious in its dialogue and situations, but made quietly entertaining and interesting through its sound characterisation and anthentic atmosphere. Modest thrills are dovetailed into the development and sufficient dramatic momentum is obtained to keep the interest alive."

Picture Show wrote: "Entertaining drama ... Competently acted, straightforwardly directed."

Picturegoer wrote: "Naive romance of a simple order. Very obvious in situation and dialogue, but good in atmosphere and characterisation. Betty Stockfeld is vivacious as the heroine."
