= Dead Man's Shoes (1940 film) =

1940 British film by Thomas Bentley

- American release poster
- Directed by: Thomas Bentley
- Written by: Nina Jarvis; John H. Kafka
- Produced by: Walter C. Mycroft
- Starring: Leslie Banks; Joan Marion; Wilfrid Lawson; Judy Kelly
- Cinematography: Günther Krampf
- Edited by: Monica Kimick
- Production company: ABPC
- Distributed by: ABFD (UK); Monogram Pictures (US)
- Release date: 5 May 1940
- Running time: 70 minutes
- Country: United Kingdom
- Language: English
- Budget: £29,094

Dead Man's Shoes is a 1940 British mystery drama film directed by Thomas Bentley and starring Leslie Banks, Joan Marion and Wilfrid Lawson. It was written by Nina Jarvis and John H. Kafka. The film is considered an antecedent of British Film Noir.

== Plot ==
Criminal Jean Pelletier has lost his memory and risen to a position of authority and respect. One day he is confronted by a man who claims to have been involved with him in the past.

== Cast ==
- Leslie Banks as Roger de Vetheuil
- Joan Marion as Viola de Vetheuil
- Geoffrey Atkins as Paul de Vetheuil
- Wilfrid Lawson as Lucien Sarrou
- Judy Kelly as Michelle Allain
- Nancy Price as Madame Pelletier
- Walter Hudd as Gaston Alexandri
- Peter Bull as Defence Counsel
- Henry Oscar as President of the Court
- Ludwig Stössel as Doctor Breithaut
- Roddy McDowall as boy

== Production ==
Inspired by the 1938 French film Carrefour (aka Crossroads), it was made by Associated British Picture Corporation at the company's Elstree Studios.

== Release ==
The film was completed in late 1939, but was not released until the following year.

== Reception ==
The Monthly Film Bulletin wrote: "English remake of Carrefour. ... The story, sequences and settings of the original are closely adhered to, and this is to be regretted as it cramps the style of a competent cast and renders less interesting an unusual and gripping story."

The Daily Film Renter wrote: "Novel presentation of mistaken identity theme, in which central character is uncertain of his own status. Logically developed plot moves against Parisian backgrounds and takes in interesting libel lawsuit, blackmail efforts, and good emotional angles. Smoothly directed, and with definite suspense angles, the subject has been cleverly produced in workmanlike fashion, with sound work by strong cast."

Variety wrote: "Chief merit of this dramatic, interesting story is that it goes straight into tense situations without usual preliminary staging of background and character. ... Though highly improbable, the picture has undeniable attraction, in that there are unexpected twists, and things don't pan out the way the audience anticipates."
