= Mr. Quincy of Monte Carlo =

- Hamilton Keene, Roland Gillett and John Stuart in the film
- Directed by: John Daumery
- Written by: Brock Williams
- Produced by: Irving Asher
- Starring: John Stuart; Rosemary Ames; Ben Welden
- Cinematography: Basil Emmott
- Production company: Warner Brothers
- Distributed by: Warner Brothers
- Release date: 1933
- Running time: 53 minutes
- Country: United Kingdom
- Language: English

Mr. Quincy of Monte Carlo is a 1933 British comedy film directed by John Daumery and starring John Stuart, Rosemary Ames and Ben Welden. It was written by Brock Wiliams and made at Teddington Studios as a quota quickie.

== Preservation status ==
The British Film Institute National Archive holds a collection of ephemera but no film or video materials.

== Plot ==
Shy bank clerk Mr Quincy is sacked for being inefficient. He meets heiress Norma McLeod who mistakes him for him for another Quincy, a milionnaire, and helps cure him of his shyness.

== Cast ==
- John Stuart as Mr Quincy
- Rosemary Ames as Norma McLeod
- Ben Welden as Grover Jones
- George Merritt as Inspector
- Victor Fairley as manager
- Hamilton Keene as bank clerk
- Roland Gillett as bank clerk

== Reception ==
Film Weekly wrote: "Very weak stuff, which could only entertain the uncritical. John Stuart, as the bank clerk, is transformed into a sort of imitation Harold Lloyd. All he needed was an ingenious 'gag' man, but if there are any comedy gags in the ridiculous story, they are pathetically feeble. The treatment, in keeping with the theme, is extraordinarily naive. The director perforce spends a long time over situations which would serve for a few moments' amusement in a two-reel slapstick comedy. The supporting cast has little to do, and doesn't do even that particularly well."

Kine Weekly wrote: "Amusing comedy of a bank clerk's dilemma as a supposed millionaire. Plot is slight, but well adapted to the footage, which contains a steady percentage of laughs. The length and quality of material combine with the star's personality to make a useful light inclusion in the general programme."

Picturegoer wrote: "Quite an amusing little comedy of a shy bank clerk who is told he is a millionaire and is swindled by his lawyer. However, he has met an heiress who cures him of his shyness and whom he marries. John Stuart is very good in the leading role and Ben Weldon gives a sound character sketch as the lawyer. Rosemary Ames is adequate as the heroine."
