= Frank Richardson (director) =

American film director and screenwriter(1898–1962)

- Born: 6 September 1898; Philadelphia, Pennsylvania; United States
- Died: 30 January 1962 (aged 63); Philadelphia, Pennsylvania; United States
- Other name: Frankland Atwood Richardson
- Occupations: Director, Screenwriter
- Years active: 1918-1950 (film)

Frank Atwood Richardson (1898–1962) was an American film director and screenwriter. In the 1920s and 1930s he worked in Britain, directing several quota quickies including Don't Be a Dummy (1932).

Commenting on his work on The Avenging Hand (1936), co-directed with Victor Hanbury, film historian Steve Chibnall noted that Richardson was "an American director of such incompetence that some believed he was an Englishman faking the accent" and that the film "needed considerable rescuing."

== Selected filmography ==
- Kitty Tailleur (1921)
- Sheer Bluff (1921)
- The White Hen (1921)
- King of the Pack (1926)
- Racing Blood (1926)
- The River House Ghost (1932)
- Don't Be a Dummy (1932)
- Above Rubies (1932)
- Double Wedding (1933)
- The Howard Case (1936)
- The Avenging Hand (1937)
- That's the Ticket (1940)
- Bait (1950)
