= Lord of the Manor (film) =

1933 film by Henry Edwards

- Opening titles
- Directed by: Henry Edwards
- Written by: John Hastings Turner (play); Dorothy Rowan
- Produced by: Herbert Wilcox
- Starring: Betty Stockfeld; Frederick Kerr; Henry Wilcoxon
- Cinematography: Henry Harris
- Edited by: Clifford Gulliver
- Production company: British and Dominions
- Distributed by: Paramount British Pictures
- Release date: May 1933
- Running time: 71 minutes
- Country: United Kingdom
- Language: English

Lord of the Manor is a 1933 British comedy film directed by Henry Edwards and starring Betty Stockfeld, Frederick Kerr and Henry Wilcoxon. It was written by Dorothy Rowan based on the 1928 play of the same title by John Hastings Turner, and was made at British and Dominion Elstree Studios as a quota film for release by Paramount Pictures. The film's sets were designed by Wilfred Arnold.

== Plot summary ==
During a party at a country house, a number of the guests switch their romantic partners.

== Cast ==
- Betty Stockfeld as Barbara Fleeter
- Frederick Kerr as Sir Henry Bovey
- Henry Wilcoxon as Jim Bridge
- Kate Cutler as Lady Bovey
- Frank Bertram as George Tover
- Joan Marion as Kitty Carvell
- April Dawn as Lily Tover
- Deering Wells as Robert Bovey
- David Horne as General Sir George Fleeter
- Frederick Ross as Bartlett
- Stanley Vine as Atwic

== Reception ==
Kine Weekly wrote: "The film depends to a great extent on its dialogue for its humour, but good movement is nevertheless maintained. The acting is far above the average, and the perfect types suggested by Fred Kerr, Betty Stockfeld, David Horne and Kate Cutler enable the gentle and typically English comedy and sentiments to register. ... The involved but nevertheless clever and amusing story works out neatly, and the situations are handled with skill and point by a brilliant group of artistes."

The Daily Film Renter wrote: "Action on stagy lines as result of uninspired direction, but quota of witty lines and amusing situations create much entertainment. Superb performance by late Fred Kerr as choleric baronet. ... As a film, this effort is negligible, but by virtue of its plentiful supply of witty lines and genuinely amusing situations, it will probably cause kinema patrons much entertainment."

Picture Show wrote: "Leisurely, amusing comedy, dominated by the delightful characterisation of Fred Kerr, whose death has meant a great loss to our screen. Beautifully set and well cast."
