= She Was Only a Village Maiden =

1933 film by Arthur Maude

- Directed by: Arthur Maude
- Written by: N.W. Baring-Pemberton; John Cousins
- Based on: play Priscilla the Rake by Fanny Bowker
- Produced by: Ivar Campbell
- Starring: Anne Grey; Lester Matthews; Carl Harbord
- Cinematography: George Stretton
- Production companies: Sound City Films; Veneficus Films
- Distributed by: Metro-Goldwyn-Mayer
- Release date: February 1933
- Running time: 60 minutes
- Country: United Kingdom
- Language: English

She Was Only a Village Maiden (also known as Priscilla the Rake) is a 1933 British comedy film directed by Arthur Maude and starring Anne Grey, Lester Matthews and Carl Harbord. It was written by John Cousins and N.W. Baring-Pemberton based on the 1927 play Priscilla the Rake by Fanny Bowker. It was made at Shepperton Studios as a quota quickie.

== Preservation status ==
The British Film Institute National Archive holds a collection of stills but no film or video materials.

== Plot ==
Thirty-year-old Priscilla Prothero leaves the home she shares with her two elderly and starchy sisters, Cecilia and Agatha, and falls for twenty-year-old Peter Wingate. Attempting to hide her feelings from him, she announces a fake engagement to her solicitor Charles Frampton. Meanwhile, she tells her sisters that she is engaged to the elderly Duke of Buckfast. This confusing situation leads to trouble when, during a visit to her sisters, all three of the men, plus the local vicar (another admirer), show up simultaneously.

== Cast ==
- Anne Grey as Priscilla Protheroe
- Lester Matthews as Frampton
- Carl Harbord as Peter Wingate
- Barbara Everest as Agatha
- Julian Royce as Duke of Buckfast
- Anthony Holles as vicar
- Gertrude Sterroll as Lady Lodden
- Daphne Scorer as Emily
- Ella Daincourt as Mrs. Cruickshank

== Reception ==
Kine Weekly wrote: "Arthur Maude has failed to make the characters altogether convincing, though he has provided some amusing sequences showing the correct attitude ot the old fashioned spinsters. Priscilla's reactions to them and to her various admirers are apt to be hazy at times . There is, however, quite a good final scene smacking of burlesque where she uses disgrace to assist her dismissal of the unwanted suitors."

The Daily Film Renter wrote: "Tedious story with unnecessary verbosity, that fails to hold interest. Little action and slow direction in portrayal of village maiden suddenly transported to surroundings of wealth and freedom. Even some excellent touches of characterisation are unable to remove general falsity of atmosphere. Cast unable to do much with thoroughly indifferent material."
