= Little Fella =

- Directed by: William C. McGann
- Written by: Scott Darling
- Produced by: Irving Asher
- Starring: John Stuart; Joan Marion; Hal Walters
- Cinematography: Basil Emmott
- Production company: Warner Brothers
- Distributed by: Warner Brothers
- Release date: October 1933
- Running time: 45 minutes
- Country: United Kingdom
- Language: English

Little Fella is a 1933 British comedy film directed by William C. McGann and starring John Stuart, Joan Marion and Hal Walters. It was written by Scott Darling, and made at Teddington Studios as a quota quickie.

== Preservation status ==
The British Film Institute National Archive holds a collection of ephemera and stills but no film or video materials.

== Plot ==
During a rehearsal for their marriage ceremony, Major Tony Griffiths and his bride-to-be, the mercenary Cynthia Knowles, are interrupted by a young lady, named Pan, who is in distress and carrying a baby. Griffiths takes a kindly interest in her, and she is sent to his farm in the country. Pan had escaped from an orphanage with the baby, to save it from being adopted. Griiffiths realises that Cynthia is heartless, marries Pan, and adopts the baby.

== Cast ==
- Marie Ault as Mrs Turner
- Glyn James as Bubblekins
- Joan Marion as Cynthia Knowles
- George Merritt as Detective
- John Stuart as Major Tony Griffiths
- Hal Walters as Dawes
- Dodo Watts as Pan

== Reception ==
Film Weekly wrote: "Weak British quota picture, which is not a credit either to its players or its director. ... As long as it keeps to comedy, with the baby as the chief comedian, the film is fairly entertaining. But when it becomes serious it descends to in believable depths of bathos. Even as a supporting picture it is poor entertainment."

Kine Weekly wrote: "Sentimental comedy romance which has unsophisticated charm and carries feminine appeal. The engaging antics of the Baby Glyn James are a delight, while there is a full measure of popular comedy to balance the sentimental interludes. A pleasant, homely picture, one which can be depended upon to make a satisfactory supporting offering for popular audiences."
