= Helen Ferrers =

British actress (1869–1943)

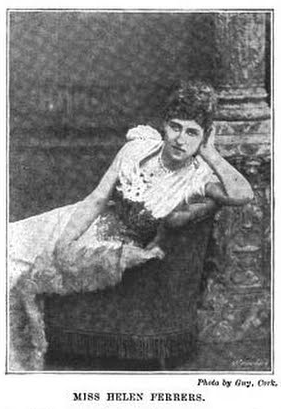
- Helen Ferrers in an 1893 publication
- Born: Helen Ferrers ca. 1869; Cookham, Berkshire, United Kingdom
- Died: 1943
- Occupations: Theatre and film actress
- Years active: 1903-1935
- Spouse: Eugène François Mayeur
- Children: Mary Helen Mayeur
- Relatives: May Fortescue

Helen Ferrers (1869–1943), born Helen Finney, was a British stage and film actress.

== Personal life ==
Helen Finney was born in Cookham in Berkshire, the daughter of a London coal merchant and the younger sister of the actress May Fortescue (née Emily May Finney).

She was married to the actor Eugène François Mayeur, who died in 1918. The couple had one daughter, Mary Helen Mayeur.

== Filmography ==
Year	Title	Role	Notes
1931	Sally in Our Alley	Duchess of Wexford	
1932	Help Yourself	Lady Hermione Quinnock	
1932	Mr. Bill the Conqueror	Mrs. Priddy	
1932	Love on the Spot	Lady Witchell	
1932	The River House Ghost	Martha Usher	
1933	Going Straight	Lady Peckham	
1933	Born Lucky	Lady Chard	
1933	Summer Lightning	Lady Emsworth	
1933	Red Wagon	Minor Role	Uncredited
1933	The Laughter of Fools	Mrs. Gregg	
1933	Beware of Women	Lady Edeley	Short
1934	Guest of Honour	Mrs. Gilwattle	
1934	Dick Turpin	Lady Rookwood	
1934	Meet My Sister	Honorable Christine Wilby	
1934	The Primrose Path	Mts. Hassee	
1934	Get Your Man	Agatha McAlpine	
1934	Jew Süss		Uncredited
1935	Look Up and Laugh	Lady Buster	(final film role)

== Selected stage credits ==
- The Cardinal (1903, Louis N. Parker)
- The River (1925, Patrick Hastings)
