= Too Many Wives (1933 film) =

1933 film

- Directed by: George King
- Written by: W. Scott Darling
- Produced by: Irving Asher
- Starring: Claude Flemming; Alf Goddard; Jack Hobbs
- Cinematography: Basil Emmott
- Production company: Warner Bros.
- Distributed by: Warner Bros.
- Release date: 1933
- Running time: 58 minutes
- Country: United Kingdom
- Language: English

Too Many Wives (also known as This is the Wife) is a 1933 British comedy film directed by George King and starring Claude Flemming, Alf Goddard and Jack Hobbs. It was written by W. Scott Darling. It was a quota quickie made at Teddington Studios by the British subsidiary of Warner Bros.

== Preservation status ==
The British Film Institute National Archive holds no stills or ephemera, and no film or video materials.

== Plot ==
After a quarrel with her husband John, Hilary Wildely leaves him, and returns to her job as a secretary. When John's boss asks him to entertain an important foreign visitor, he persuades Sally, his and Hilary's maid, to impersonate Hilary. When the visitor arrives, so does Hilary, as his secretary. Farcial complications ensue.

== Cast ==
- Claude Flemming as Baron von Schlossen
- Alf Goddard as Jeff
- Jack Hobbs as John Wildely
- Viola Keats as Sally
- Nora Swinburne as Hilary Wildely
- Charles Paton
- John Turnbull

== Reception ==
Kine Weekly wrote: "This farcical comedy is no big joke, just a rehashing of familiar chestnuts. The marital mix-up is old and the players are too pleased with themselves to worry about the demands of the audience. Very moderate quota second feature tor unexacting patrons."

The Daily Film Renter wrote: "Episodic plot treatment contrives to make picture unconvincing, while humorous touches, though scattered fairly plentifully through film, are of rather obvious order. Fair entertainment for popular halls. ... The story's improbabilities are treated in a lighthearted way, which to some extent disarms criticism, but the comedy incidents, though amusing enough, are insufficiently novel, since the humors of jujitsu and chaotic car pursuits have been so often exploited before."

Picturegoer wrote: "An old, indifferently acted marital mix-up served up with a prize collection of familiar chestnuts."
