= One Precious Year =

- Directed by: Henry Edwards
- Written by: Dorothy Rowan; E. Temple Thurston (play)
- Produced by: Herbert Wilcox
- Starring: Anne Grey; Basil Rathbone; Owen Nares
- Cinematography: Stanley Rodwell
- Production company: British and Dominions
- Distributed by: Paramount British Pictures
- Release date: February 1933
- Running time: 76 minutes
- Country: United Kingdom
- Language: English

One Precious Year is a 1933 British drama film directed by Henry Edwards and starring Anne Grey, Basil Rathbone and Owen Nares. It was made at British and Dominion Elstree Studios by the British producer Herbert Wilcox for release by the British subsidiary of Paramount Pictures. The film's sets were designed by the art director C. Wilfred Arnold.

== Cast ==
- Anne Grey as Dierdre Carton
- Basil Rathbone as Derek Nagel
- Owen Nares as Stephen Carton
- Flora Robson as Julia Skene
- Evelyn Roberts as Mr. Telford
- H.G. Stoker as Sir John Rome
- Robert Horton as Dr. Hibbert
- Violet Hopson as Woman at Party
- Jennie Robins as Specialty
- Western Brothers as Speciality
- Ben Webster as Sir Richard Pakenham
- Ronald Simpson
- Olga Slade

== Bibliography ==
- Chibnall, Steve. Quota Quickies: The Birth of the British 'B' Film. British Film Institute, 2007.
- Low, Rachael. Filmmaking in 1930s Britain. George Allen & Unwin, 1985.
- Wood, Linda. British Films, 1927-1939. British Film Institute, 1986.
