= Jean Daumery =

Belgian-born film director (1898–1934)

Jean Daumery (1898-1934) was a Belgian-born film director. Jean (John) Daumery is the pseudonym of Jean Nicolas Pierre Ysaÿe. He was born in Brussels (Belgium) on 17 May 1898. He was the son of the pianist and composer Théo Ysaÿe and the actress Carrie Mess, better known as Carrie Daumery. His uncle was the famous violinist Eugène Ysaÿe. In the First World War, Jean Ysaÿe was a soldier who shot films for the Belgian army behind the front. During this work, he inhaled poison gas from which he died in Lausanne (Switzerland) on 3 May 1934. Two months before his death, he married Béatrice Henriette Potter. As a film director, he worked in Paris and London for Warner Bros. First National. He made about twenty films, with amongst others as actor Jean Gabin (La Foule hurle), Percy Marmont (Blind Spot) and John Stuart (Naughty Cinderella), as actress Wendy Barrie (This Acting Business) and Marian Marsh (Over the Garden Wall), and as screenwriter Paul Vialar (Le Soir des Rois).

== Selected filmography ==
- The Little Snob (1928)
- Counter Investigation (1930)
- Rough Waters (1930)
- Help Yourself (1932)
- Blind Spot (1932)
- Naughty Cinderella (1933)
- The Case of Doctor Brenner (1933)
- Little Miss Nobody (1933)
- This Acting Business (1933)
- Call Me Mame (1933)
- Mr. Quincey of Monte Carlo (1933)
- Meet My Sister (1933)
- Head of the Family (1933)
- Over the Garden Wall (1934)
- Without You (1934)
