= The Melody-Maker =

- Directed by: Leslie S. Hiscott
- Produced by: Irving Asher
- Starring: Lester Matthews; Joan Marion; Evelyn Roberts
- Cinematography: Basil Emmott
- Production company: Warner Brothers
- Distributed by: Warner Brothers
- Release date: March 1933
- Running time: 56 minutes
- Country: United Kingdom
- Language: English

The Melody-Maker is a 1933 British musical comedy film directed by Leslie S. Hiscott and starring Lester Matthews, Joan Marion and Evelyn Roberts . The film was made at Teddington Studios as a quota quickie by the British subsidiary of Warner Brothers.

== Cast ==
- Lester Matthews as Tony Borrodaile
- Joan Marion as Mary
- Evelyn Roberts as Reggie Bumblethorpe
- Wallace Lupino as Clamart
- A. Bromley Davenport as Jenks
- Vera Gerald as Grandma
- Joan White as Jerry
- Charles Hawtrey as Torn
- Toni Edgar-Bruce as Donna Lola

== Production ==
The Melody-Maker was filmed at Warner Brothers First National Studios, Teddington, Middlesex by Warner Brothers First National.
