= The Poisoned Diamond =

- Directed by: W. P. Kellino
- Written by: W.P. Kellino
- Produced by: Fred Browett
- Starring: Lester Matthews; Anne Grey; Patric Knowles
- Production company: Grafton Films
- Distributed by: Columbia Pictures
- Release date: 1933
- Running time: 73 minutes
- Country: United Kingdom
- Language: English

The Poisoned Diamond is a 1933 British drama film directed by W. P. Kellino and starring Lester Matthews, Anne Grey and Patric Knowles. It was made as a quota quickie for release by Columbia Pictures.

== Cast ==
- Lester Matthews as John Reader
- Anne Grey as Mary Davidson
- Patric Knowles as Jack Dane
- Raymond Raikes
- Bryan Powley
- Lucius Blake
- D.J. Williams
- Hilda Campbell-Russell as Reader's Secretary

== Bibliography ==
- Chibnall, Steve. Quota Quickies: The Birth of the British 'B' Film. British Film Institute, 2007.
- Low, Rachael. Filmmaking in 1930s Britain. George Allen & Unwin, 1985.
- Wood, Linda. British Films, 1927-1939. British Film Institute, 1986.
