= Joan Marion =

Australian actress (1908–2001)

- from Spotlight directory, 1939
- Born: Joan Marion Nicholls; 28 September 1908; Launceston, Tasmania, Australia
- Died: 5 November 2001 (aged 93); Sheringham, Norfolk, England
- Education: RADA
- Spouse: Louis Everette de Rouet (m. 1940; died 1972)
- Children: 1

Joan Marion Nicholls (28 September 1908 – 5 November 2001), known professionally as Joan Marion, was an Australian-born stage, film, and television actress. Her family moved to Britain when she was three, and at 18, she attended the Royal Academy of Dramatic Art, where she adopted the name Joan Marion. Subsequently as a busy stage star, she made the record books in 1934, when she appeared in two West End shows simultaneously, Men in White with Ralph Richardson and Without Witness. She also famously turned down Jack Warner and a Hollywood career, describing him as "a horrid little man." Marion continued in the theatre and British films until her marriage to wine expert Louis Everette de Rouet. With the birth of her daughter, she spent many years travelling the world with her family.

== Selected filmography ==
- Her Night Out (1932)
- The River House Ghost (1932)
- The Stolen Necklace (1933)
- The Melody-Maker (1933)
- Little Fella (1933)
- Double Wedding (1933)
- Out of the Past (1933)
- Lord of the Manor (1933)
- Tangled Evidence (1934)
- Sensation (1936)
- For Valour (1937)
- Premiere (1938)
- Black Limelight (1939)
- Ending It (1939)
- Dead Man's Shoes (1940)
- Ten Days in Paris (1940)
- Spies of the Air (1940)
- Tons of Trouble (1956)

== Selected stage credits ==
- Sorry You've Been Troubled (1929, Walter C. Hackett)
- Good Losers (1931, Michael Arlen and Walter C. Hackett)
- Men in White (1934, Sidney Kingsley)
- Without Witness (1934, Anthony Armstrong)
- Libel! (1935, Edward Wooll)
- Blondie White (1937, Jeffrey Dell)
