= Double Wedding (1933 film) =

1933 British film by Frank Richardson

- Directed by: Frank Richardson
- Written by: Brock Williams
- Produced by: Irving Asher
- Starring: Joan Marion; Jack Hobbs; Viola Keats
- Cinematography: Basil Emmott
- Production company: Warner Brothers
- Distributed by: Warner Brothers
- Release date: March 1933
- Running time: 49 minutes
- Country: United Kingdom
- Language: English

Double Wedding is a 1933 British comedy film directed by Frank Richardson and starring Joan Marion, Jack Hobbs and Viola Keats. It was made at Teddington Studios as a quota quickie.

== Preservation status ==
The British Film Institute National Archive holds no stills or ephemera, and no film or video materials.

== Plot ==
To put an end to the rumours surrounding Daisy and Roger, a double wedding is arranged. Daisy marries Dick Hawthorne, and Roger marries Mildred. On arriving at a country hotel for their honeymoon, Daisy and Dick fall out over Roger. Meanwhile, Mildred, who remains suspicious of her new husband Roger, arrives at the same hotel with him to clear things up. There follows much bickering between the foursome, a motor chase in which Dick is mistakenly arrested as a bank robber, several compromising bedroom scenes, and, at last, the eventual sorting out of everyone's affairs.

== Cast ==
- Joan Marion as Daisy
- Jack Hobbs as Dick
- Viola Keats as Mildred
- Anthony Hankey as Roger
- Mike Johnson as George
- Ernest Sefton as PC

== Reception ==
Kine Weekly wrote: "Marital farcical comedy, with a thin story not helped by welter or childish dialogue. The characters are fairly well portrayed, but the slow tempo reveals the triteness of the material."

The Daily Film Renter wrote: "The incessant bickerings of the two couples become boring after a few thousand feet, while the situations in which they find themselves do not, for a moment, hold water. A certain amount of comedy is injected by Mike Johnson as a garrulous hotel proprictor, but even this becomes wearisome after a while. Jack Hobbs plays Dick, and does not appear to be at his best. Viola Keats is fairly good as Daisy, despite the indifferent photography, which hardly does credit to her charm."
