= Irving Asher =

American film producer (1903–1985)

Irving Asher (September 1903 – March 1985) was an American film producer. Born in San Francisco in September 1903, he began his film production career in Hollywood in 1919. After joining the staff of Warner Brothers he was sent over to England as the managing director of their subsidiary Teddington Studios in Middlesex in the mid-1930s (where he is credited for discovering and seeing the potential of Errol Flynn when he was a young unknown actor who was hanging around Teddington Studios at the time looking for a way into the movies). Flynn played his first significant part as the lead in the now-lost Murder at Monte Carlo (1935), which was produced by Asher. Asher went on to join Alexander Korda's London Film Productions where he worked on the epic The Four Feathers (1939). Subsequently, he returned to Hollywood to work as a producer for Metro-Goldwyn-Mayer, where he earned his only Academy Award nomination for the 1941 Greer Garson film Blossoms in the Dust.

Later in his career, he was head of production for 20th Century Fox Television.

He married the actress Laura La Plante in 1934. His son is Tony Asher.

Asher died in California in March 1985.

== Partial filmography ==
- Don't Be a Dummy (1932)
- Help Yourself (1932)
- Blind Spot (1932)
- Her Night Out (1932)
- Illegal (1932)
- A Voice Said Goodnight (1932)
- High Society (1932)
- Mayfair Girl (1933)
- Beware of Women (1933)
- Double Wedding (1933)
- Out of the Past (1933)
- Smithy (1933)
- This Acting Business (1933)
- The Stolen Necklace (1933)
- As Good as New (1933)
- Little Fella (1933)
- Head of the Family (1933)
- Mr. Quincey of Monte Carlo (1933)
- Going Straight (1933)
- Too Many Wives (1933)
- Little Miss Nobody (1933)
- The Melody-Maker (1933)
- Enemy of the Police (1933)
- Call Me Mame (1933)
- Big Business (1934)
- What Happened to Harkness? (1934)
- Murder at the Inn (1934)
- The Church Mouse (1934)
- A Glimpse of Paradise (1934)
- Nine Forty-Five (1934)
- The Office Wife (1934)
- Leave It to Blanche (1934)
- Father and Son (1934)
- The Life of the Party (1934)
- No Escape (1934)
- What's in a Name? (1934)
- Trouble in Store (1934) - short
- The Black Mask (1935)
- Murder at Monte Carlo (1935)
- Man of the Moment (1935)
- Widow's Might (1935 film)
- Hello, Sweetheart (1935)
- Fair Exchange (1936)
- It's in the Bag (1936)
- Head Office (1936)
- Irish for Luck (1936)
- Gaol Break (1936)
- Faithful (1936)
- Change for a Sovereign (1937)
- Ship's Concert (1937)
- Gypsy (1937)
- Mayfair Melody (1937)
- It's in the Blood (1938)
- Double or Quits (1938)
- Quiet Please (1938)
