= Winifred Oughton =

English actress, RADA acting teacher (1890–1964)

(Annie) Winifred Oughton (1890 – 26 December 1964) was an English actress, educationalist and acting coach. She was a well-received character and comedy actress and was a teacher at the Royal Academy of Dramatic Art (RADA) from 1935 to 1958.

== Life ==
Winifred Oughton was born in 1890 in Camberwell. Her father acted in and produced amateur dramatic performances. Her own stage career began in 1915 with a walk-on-part in The Merchant of Venice at The Old Vic.

She taught drama at schools in Gloucester in the 1920s, and in 1930 was a director of the Schools Theatre. Between 1930 and 1950 she took roles as a character actor in several British films. In 1935 she moved from South London to live in Effingham, Surrey, and alongside her acting career became a teacher at RADA.

After her death in 1964, RADA established the Winifred Oughton Memorial Prize in her honour.
