= The Private Secretary (1935 film) =

- Original British trade ad
- Directed by: Henry Edwards
- Written by: George Broadhurst; Arthur Macrae; H. Fowler Mear
- Based on: The farce by Charles Hawtrey (The Private Secretary) and the book by Von Moser (Der Bibliotheker)
- Produced by: Julius Hagen
- Starring: Edward Everett Horton; Barry MacKay; Judy Gunn; Oscar Asche
- Cinematography: Sydney Blythe; William Luff
- Music by: W.L. Trytel (uncredited)
- Production company: Julius Hagen Productions
- Distributed by: Twickenham Film Distributors Ltd (UK)
- Release date: September 1935 (UK)
- Running time: 70 minutes
- Country: United Kingdom
- Language: English

The Private Secretary is a 1935 British comedy film directed by Henry Edwards and starring Edward Everett Horton, Barry MacKay, Judy Gunn and Oscar Asche. It was written by George H. Broadhurst, Arthur Macrae and H. Fowler Mear, adaptated from the 1883 play The Private Secretary by Charles Henry Hawtrey, and was made as a quota quickie at Twickenham Studios.

== Premise ==
A timid and dim-witted clergyman is duped into helping a playboy avoid his creditors, inherit his uncle's fortune and get the girl.

== Cast ==
- Edward Everett Horton as Reverend Robert Spalding
- Barry MacKay as Douglas Cattermole
- Judy Gunn as Edith Marsland
- Oscar Asche as Robert Cattermole
- Sydney Fairbrother as Miss Ashford
- Michael Shepley as Henry Marsland
- Alastair Sim as Nebulae
- Aubrey Dexter as Gibson
- O. B. Clarence as Thomas Marsland
- Davina Craig as Annie

== Critical reception ==
The Monthly Film Bulletin wrote: "If this picture had been set in the period of the play it would have had the touch of burlesque necessary to hold it together in 1935; but the settings and incidents are modern while the characters and situations remain obstinately 1880. Nor is that accomplished actor, Edward Everett Horton, physically or artistically suited to the part of the preposterous clergyman. The picture has entertainment value of the simple knockabout kind, which is rather out of the line of the cast and Alistair Sim distinguishes himself by a remarkably funny study of a medium."

Kine Weekly wrote: "Considering that it is of a similar vintage to that of Charles's Aunt, this farce, adapted from the perennial stage success, carries its age splendidly. ... The team work is excellent, there is a fine cast headed by the inimitable Edward Everett Horton, and the production work is comparable with the best. Very good comedy entertainment with a big appeal to the family and youngsters."

TV Guide felt the comedy of the Victorian farce "didn't translate well into later times. Horton and Sim (in a secondary role) serve as the film's saving graces with some nice comic moments."

Sky Movies called the film "a mostly dismal British farce stickily directed by former acting superstar Henry Edwards, but held back from disaster by the pawkily amusing performances of Edward Everett Horton, dithering delightfully in the leading role, and Alastair Sim, offering a lugubrious contribution as Mr Nebulae."
