= The Pointing Finger (1933 film) =

1933 film

- Directed by: George Pearson
- Written by: H. Fowler Mear; George Pearson
- Based on: The Pointing Finger by Eliza Margaret Humphries
- Produced by: Julius Hagen
- Starring: John Stuart; Viola Keats; Leslie Perrins
- Cinematography: Ernest Palmer
- Edited by: Lister Laurance
- Music by: William Trytel
- Production company: Real Art Productions
- Distributed by: RKO Pictures
- Release date: 6 December 1933
- Running time: 68 minutes
- Country: United Kingdom
- Language: English

The Pointing Finger is a 1933 British drama film directed by George Pearson and starring John Stuart, Viola Keats and Leslie Perrins. The plot concerns a man who plans to murder his cousin so he can claim his earldom and an inheritance. The film was made by Twickenham Film Studios with sets designed by the art director James A. Carter. It was distributed by RKO Pictures as a quota quickie. Based on the novel The Pointing Finger (1907) by "Rita," it was a remake of the 1922 film of the same name.

== Cast ==
- John Stuart as Lord Rollestone
- Viola Keats as Lady Mary Stuart
- Leslie Perrins as James Mallory
- Michael Hogan as Patrick Lafone
- A. Bromley Davenport as Lord Edensore
- Henrietta Watson as Lady Anne Rollestone
- D.J. Williams as Grimes
- Clare Greet as Landlady

== Bibliography ==
- Chibnall, Steve. Quota Quickies: The Birth of the British 'B' Film. British Film Institute, 2007.
- Low, Rachael. Filmmaking in 1930s Britain. George Allen & Unwin, 1985.
- Wood, Linda. British Films, 1927-1939. British Film Institute, 1986.
