= The Roof (1933 film) =

1933 film

- Opening titles
- Directed by: George A. Cooper
- Written by: H. Fowler Mear
- Based on: The Roof by David Whitelaw
- Produced by: Julius Hagen
- Starring: Leslie Perrins; Judy Gunn; Russell Thorndike
- Cinematography: Sydney Blythe
- Edited by: Lister Laurance
- Music by: William Trytel
- Production company: Real Art Productions
- Distributed by: RKO Pictures
- Release date: November 1933
- Running time: 58 minutes
- Country: United Kingdom
- Language: English

The Roof is a 1933 British crime film directed by George A. Cooper and starring Leslie Perrins, Judy Gunn, Russell Thorndike and Michael Hogan. It was written by H. Fowler Mear based on the 1933 novel of the same title by David Whitelaw.

== Plot ==
Crook Clive Bristow learns that Otto Bemberg has placed a fortune in jewels into a trust for his missing son, Max. Years later, Bristow devises a scheme to install one of his henchmen, Arthur Stannard, as the fraudulent heir. Bristow gets the jewels, but Inspector Darrow from Scotland Yard arrives just in time to arrest the crooks. In a final twist, it is revealed that the solicitor entrusted with the gems had actually been stealing them for years. To hide his tracks, he murdered a man named James Renton, a crime that had previously been blamed on Bristow.

== Cast ==
- Leslie Perrins as Inspector Darrow
- Judy Gunn as Carole Foster
- Russell Thorndike as Clive Bristow
- Michael Hogan as Samuel Morton
- Ivor Barnard as Arthur Stannard
- Eliot Makeham as John Rutherford
- Barbara Everest as Mrs Foster
- George Zucco as James Renton
- Leo Britt as Tony Freyne
- D. J. Williams as Fritz Klein
- Hector Abbas as Otto Bemberg
- Cyril Smith as McNair

== Production ==
The film was shot at Twickenham Studios in London as a quota quickie for release by RKO Pictures. The film's sets were designed by Twickenham's resident art director James A. Carter.

== Reception ==
The Daily Film Renter wrote: "Acting smacks of old-time stage, save for promising performance by Judy Gunn, newcomer of obvious talent. ... It is impossible to believe in the stodgy situations set forth in this crude melodrama that smacks strongly of the penny dreadful. The action is held up continually by long passages of dreary dialogue, often entirely irrelevant to the plot. Direction is uninspired throughout."

Picturegoer wrote: "Rather stretches the long arm of coincidence but is competently acted."

Picture Show wrote: "Entertaining crook melodrama, swift-moving, packed with suspense and incident."
