= Open All Night (1934 film) =

1934 film

- Directed by: George Pearson
- Written by: John Chancellor; Gerard Fairlie
- Produced by: Julius Hagen
- Starring: Frank Vosper; Margaret Vines; Gillian Lind
- Cinematography: Ernest Palmer
- Edited by: Lister Laurance
- Music by: William Trytel
- Production company: Real Art Productions
- Distributed by: RKO Pictures
- Release date: October 1934
- Running time: 62 minutes
- Country: United Kingdom
- Language: English

Open All Night is a 1934 British drama film directed by George Pearson and starring Frank Vosper, Margaret Vines, Gillian Lind, Geraldine Fitzgerald and Michael Shepley. It was made at Twickenham Studios in London. The film's sets were designed by the art director James Carter. The film was produced as a quota quickie by Julius Hagen for distribution by RKO Pictures. It was later released in the United States under the alternative title Murder by Appointment.

== Synopsis ==
Anton, a Grand Duke who was forced to flee Russia after the 1917 Revolution, now works as the night manager at Paragon House, a London hotel, where he puts his life on the line to help somebody else.

== Cast ==
- Frank Vosper as Anton
- Margaret Vines as Elsie Warren
- Gillian Lind as Maysie
- Lewis Shaw as Bill Warren
- Leslie Perrins as Ranger
- Colin Keith-Johnston as Henry
- Geraldine Fitzgerald as Jill
- Michael Shepley as Hilary

== Bibliography ==
- Chibnall, Steve. Quota Quickies: The Birth of the British 'B' Film. British Film Institute, 2007.
- Low, Rachael. Filmmaking in 1930s Britain. George Allen & Unwin, 1985.
- Wood, Linda. British Films, 1927-1939. British Film Institute, 1986.
