= The Lash (1934 film) =

- Opening title
- Directed by: Henry Edwards
- Written by: Cyril Campion (play); Sewell Collins; Owen Davis; Vera Allinson; H. Fowler Mear; Brock Williams
- Produced by: Julius Hagen
- Starring: Lyn Harding; John Mills; Joan Maude; Leslie Perrins
- Cinematography: Ernest Palmer; William Luff
- Music by: W.L. Trytel
- Production company: Twickenham Studios
- Distributed by: Radio Pictures
- Release date: 1934
- Running time: 63 minutes
- Country: United Kingdom
- Language: English

The Lash is a 1934 British drama film directed by Henry Edwards and starring Lyn Harding, John Mills and Leslie Perrins. It was based on a play of the same name by Cyril Campion. The film was made as a quota quickie by Twickenham Studios, one of the largest producers of Quota films.

== Plot ==
A brutish millionaire horsewhips his dissolute son.

== Cast ==
- Lyn Harding - Bronson Haughton
- John Mills - Arthur Haughton
- Joan Maude - Dora Bush
- Leslie Perrins - Alec Larkin
- Mary Jerrold - Margaret Haughton
- Aubrey Mather - Col. Bush
- D. J. Williams - Mr. Charles
- Roy Emerton - Steve
- Victor Stanley - Jake
