= The Rosary (1931 film) =

1931 film

No Lady
- Directed by: Guy Newall
- Written by: John McNally; Guy Newall
- Produced by: Julius Hagen
- Starring: Margot Grahame; Elizabeth Allan; Leslie Perrins
- Cinematography: Basil Emmott
- Production company: Julius Hagen Productions
- Distributed by: Williams and Pritchard Films
- Release date: 3 July 1931
- Running time: 70 minutes
- Country: United Kingdom
- Language: English

The Rosary is a 1931 British drama film directed by Guy Newall and starring Margot Grahame, Elizabeth Allan and Leslie Perrins. It was shot at Twickenham Studios in London. The film's sets were designed by the art director James A. Carter. It was released as an independent first feature, despite being produced by a company that generally concentrated on quota quickies.

== Plot ==
A woman takes the blame for a murder accidentally committed by her half-sister.

== Cast ==
- Margot Grahame as Mary Edwards
- Elizabeth Allan as Vera Mannering
- Walter Piers as Captain Mannering
- Leslie Perrins as Ronald Overton
- Robert Holmes as Dalmayne
- Charles Groves as Hornett
- Irene Rooke as Mother Superior
- Les Allen as The Singer

== Bibliography ==
- Chibnall, Steve. Quota Quickies: The Birth of the British 'B' Film. British Film Institute, 2007.
- Low, Rachael. Filmmaking in 1930s Britain. George Allen & Unwin, 1985.
- Wood, Linda. British Films, 1927–1939. British Film Institute, 1986.
