= In the Soup (1936 film) =

- Opening credits
- Directed by: Henry Edwards
- Written by: Ralph Lumley (play); H. Fowler Mear
- Produced by: Julius Hagen
- Starring: Ralph Lynn; Judy Gunn; Morton Selten; Nelson Keys
- Cinematography: Sydney Blythe; William Luff
- Edited by: Michael C. Chorlton
- Music by: W.L. Trytel
- Production company: Julius Hagen Productions
- Distributed by: Twickenham Film Distributors
- Release date: April 1936
- Running time: 80 minutes
- Country: United Kingdom
- Language: English

In the Soup is a 1936 British comedy film directed by Henry Edwards and starring Ralph Lynn, Judy Gunn, Morton Selten and Nelson Keys. It was written by H. Fowler Mear based on the 1900 play by Ralph Lumley.

== Synopsis ==
Out-of-work and hard-up barrister Horace Gillibrand is forced to sub-let his flat. His friend arranges for his prospective in-laws to move in, but Horace's wife Kitty, unaware of this, has rented the flat to Horace's prickly uncle Abernethy Ruppershaw. The two sets of tenants clash, with farcical complications.

== Cast ==
- Ralph Lynn as Horace
- Judy Gunn as Kitty
- Morton Selten as Abernethy Ruppershaw
- Nelson Keys as Emile Moppert
- Bertha Belmore as Madame Moppert
- Michael Shepley as Paul Hemming
- Olive Melville as Delphine
- Morris Harvey as Bates
- Margaret Yard as Mrs Bates
- Felix Aylmer as Counsel
- Mervyn Johns as Meakin
- Olive Sloane as defendant

== Production ==
The film was made at Twickenham Studios with sets designed by art director James Carter.

== Reception ==
The Monthly Film Bulletin wrote: "There is plenty of really good fun of a thoroughly breezy nature, and the absurd story, when once it gets into its stride, moves along at a rapid speed. Ralph Lynn does justice to an excellent part, Judy Gunn is appropriately charming as Kitty Gillibrand, Morton Selten is delightful as the uncle, and Nelson Keys gives a talented performance as a Frenchman."

Kine Weekly wrote: "Clean, wholesome, typically English farcical comedy ... The crazily involved plot is productive of much genuine amusement, and the team work and direction are good, but the real pillar of the entertainment is Ralph Lynn. He is in exceptional form, and scores as many laughs off his own bat as the preposterous situations and supporting cast put together."

The Daily Film Renter wrote: "Usual hectic complications keep action going at fast pace, while Ralph Lynn is in fine fettle as dithery lawyer. ... Brightly staged, with genuine London exteriors, the subject has been crisply handled by Henry Edwards, who has kept the tempo at exactly the requisite speed throughout. Lynn has seldom been in better fettle."
