= Tangled Evidence =

1934 film

- Lobby card
- Directed by: George A. Cooper
- Screenplay by: H. Fowler Mear
- Produced by: Julius Hagen
- Starring: Sam Livesey; Michael Hogan; Joan Marion
- Production company: Twickenham Film Studios
- Release date: 17 September 1934
- Running time: 54 minutes
- Country: United Kingdom
- Language: English

Tangled Evidence is a 1934 British mystery film directed by George A. Cooper and starring Sam Livesey, Joan Marion and Michael Hogan. It was written by H. Fowler Mear based on the1924 novel of the same title by Rose Champion de Crespigny, and was made by Twickenham Studios as a quote quickie.

== Plot ==
A studious colonel is found stabbed dead in the library of his country house. As clues are discovered, suspicion falls on his nieces, chauffeur and librarian. A visiting Scotland Yard inspector eventually uncovers the real murderer and the motive for the killing.

== Cast ==
- Sam Livesey as Inspector Drayton
- Joan Marion as Anne Wilmot
- Michael Hogan as Ingram Underhill
- Michael Shepley as Gilbert Morfield
- Reginald Tate as Ellaby
- Dick Francis as Frame
- Edgar Norfolk as Doctor Acland
- John Turnbull as Moore
- Davina Craig as Faith
- Gillian Maude as Paula

== Reception ==
Kine Weekly wrote: "George Cooper's direction deserves praise. It is crisp, interesting, effective. Its one weakness is shown in the humorous scenes, which fortunately are few and short, but even these are unable to divert or slacken interest."

The Daily Film Renter wrote: "Not very convincing plot, replete with usual 'red herring' clues, principally directed against heroine. Country house interiors are principal backgrounds. Chief interest lies in Scotland Yard sleuth portrayal by Sam Livesey."

Picturegoer wrote: "Quite an ingenious detective drama ... While at times one is not wholly convinced, the story is quite well constructed and avoids 'red herring' trails to a large extent. The treatment is brisk, but one could have done without the few humorous scenes included, which are distinctly weak. ... Michael Hogan is especially good as the novelist."
