= A Shot in the Dark (1933 film) =

Shot in the Dark
- Directed by: George Pearson
- Written by: Gerard Fairlie; Terence Egan
- Based on: Shot in the Dark; 1932 novel by Gerard Fairlie
- Produced by: Julius Hagen
- Starring: Dorothy Boyd; O. B. Clarence; Jack Hawkins; Michael Shepley
- Cinematography: Ernest Palmer
- Edited by: Lister Laurance
- Production company: Twickenham Studios
- Distributed by: Radio Pictures
- Release date: November 1933
- Running time: 53 minutes
- Country: United Kingdom
- Language: English

Shot in the Dark (also known as A Shot in the Dark) is a 1933 British mystery film directed by George Pearson and starring Dorothy Boyd, O. B. Clarence, Jack Hawkins and Michael Shepley. The film was adapted by Pearson and Terence Egan and written by Gerard Fairlie from his eponymous 1932 novel, and shot at Twickenham Studios in London as a quota quickie for release by RKO Pictures.

== Synopsis ==
When a wealthy old man dies suddenly, a local priest suspects something and begins to investigate.

== Cast ==
- Dorothy Boyd as Alaris Browne
- O. B. Clarence as Reverend John Makehan
- Jack Hawkins as Norman Paull
- Michael Shepley as Vivien Waugh
- Davy Burnaby as Colonel Michael Browne
- A. Bromley Davenport as Peter Browne
- Russell Thorndike as Doctor Stuart
- Hugh E. Wright as George Yarrow
- Henrietta Watson as Angela Browne
- Margaret Yarde as Kate Browne

== Critical reception ==
Kine Weekly wrote: "The opening stages are well-developed, but the progress of the plot is considerably slowed by the many false clues which hinder the investigator. Credulity is strained by so many people attempting to commit murder on the same stormy evening."

In British Sound Films: The Studio Years 1928–1959 David Quinlan rated the film as "mediocre", writing: "Typical multi-suspect whodunnit."

Britmovie called the film a "typical multi-suspect "quota quickie""
