= Vintage Wine =

- Opening title
- Directed by: Henry Edwards
- Written by: Ashley Dukes; Seymour Hicks; H. Fowler Mear
- Produced by: Julius Hagen
- Starring: Seymour Hicks; Claire Luce; Eva Moore; Judy Gunn
- Cinematography: Sydney Blythe
- Edited by: Baynham Honri; Ralph Kemplen
- Music by: W. L. Trytel
- Production company: Twickenham Studios
- Distributed by: Gaumont British Distributors
- Release date: 20 June 1935
- Running time: 81 minutes
- Country: United Kingdom
- Language: English

Vintage Wine is a 1935 British comedy film directed by Henry Edwards and starring Seymour Hicks, Claire Luce, Eva Moore and Judy Gunn. The film was made at Julius Hagen's Twickenham Studios, but was released by Gaumont British Distributors which was the largest British film company at the time. The film was loosely based on a German play by Alexander Engels, which also formed the basis of the 1934 West End comedy by Ashley Dukes and Seymour Hicks.

== Synopsis ==
The members of the Popinot family of French champagne tycoons suspect that the widowed head of the family Charles Popinot is keeping a mistress in Rome and generally living a wild life. Unbeknownst to them he has happily remarried and had a son with a much younger woman. She believes he is twenty years younger than he really is and is shocked when his relatives including his mother, grown-up sons and granddaughter arrive in Italy.

== Cast ==
- Seymour Hicks as Charles Popinot
- Claire Luce as Nina Popinot
- Eva Moore as Josephine Popinot
- Judy Gunn as Blanche Popinot
- Miles Malleson as Henri Popinot
- Kynaston Reeves as Benedict Popinot
- Michael Shepley as Richard Emsley
- A. Bromley Davenport as Pierre
- Amy Brandon Thomas as Minor role
- Elisabeth Croft as Minor role
- Kathleen Weston as Family Member.

== Bibliography ==
- Low, Rachael. Filmmaking in 1930s Britain. George Allen & Unwin, 1985.
- Wood, Linda. British Films, 1927–1939. British Film Institute, 1986.
