= Anything Might Happen =

1935 British film by George A. Cooper

- John Garrick and Judy Kelly in the film
- Directed by: George A. Cooper
- Written by: H. Fowler Mear
- Produced by: Julius Hagen
- Starring: John Garrick; Judy Kelly; Martin Walker
- Cinematography: Ernest Palmer
- Production company: Twickenham Studios
- Distributed by: RKO
- Release date: 18 March 1935
- Running time: 66 minutes
- Country: United Kingdom
- Language: English

Anything Might Happen is a 1934 British crime film directed by George A. Cooper and starring John Garrick, Judy Kelly and Martin Walker. It was written by H. Fowler Mear and made as a quota quickie at Twickenham Studios for release by the American company RKO.

== Preservation status ==
The British Film Institute National Archive holds no stills or ephemera, and no film or video materials.

== Plot ==
Reformed crook Stephen Nicholson is secretly working for the police to help them solve a murder. Kit Dundas, secretary to solicitor Kenneth Waring, believes that Nicholson himself is the murderer, having confused him with his double, Raybourn, whom she had seen leaving the crime scene. The culprit turns out to be Waring.

== Cast ==
- John Garrick as Stephen Nicholson / Raybourn
- Judy Kelly as Kit Dundas
- Martin Walker as Kenneth Waring
- Aubrey Mather as Seymour
- D.J. Williams as Brown
- Albert Whelan as Strickland

== Reception ==
Kine Weekly wrote: "This crime drama is never lost for a word; it is talk, talk talk from beginning to end. The plot, which hinges on the hackneyed mistaken identity theme, is very complicated, and its development is rendered all the more difficult to follow by reason of the fact that the star plays many roles. John Garrick's performance suggests a histrionic one-man band. A lukewarm thriller this, just passable supporung entertainment for the industrial masses."

The Daily Film Renter wrote: "Film moves rather slowly, but development provides moderate suspense values. Stagy portrayals by leading players, with effective interior settings. Quota fare for the not-too-critical."

Picturegoer wrote: "A story of mistaken identity complicated in its development and overloaded with dialogue. John Garrick struggles with the triple [sic] role of a reformed crook."
