= The Ace of Spades =

1935 British film by George Pearson

- Directed by: George Pearson
- Written by: Gerard Fairlie; John Crawford Fraser (novel)
- Produced by: Julius Hagen
- Starring: Michael Hogan; Dorothy Boyd; Richard Cooper; Michael Shepley
- Cinematography: Ernest Palmer
- Edited by: Michael C. Chorlton
- Music by: W.L. Trytel
- Production company: Twickenham Studios
- Distributed by: Radio Pictures
- Release date: February 1935
- Running time: 66 minutes
- Country: United Kingdom
- Language: English

The Ace of Spades is a 1935 British drama film directed by George Pearson and starring Michael Hogan, Dorothy Boyd and Richard Cooper. It was written by Gerard Fairlie based on the 1919 novel of the same title by John Crawford Fraser.

== Plot ==
Nick Trent is young by-election candidate supporting the building of a new railway line through the estate of a local landowner. When the landowner is knocked down and killed by a car, Trent is suspected of involvement.

== Cast ==
- Michael Hogan as Nick Trent
- Dorothy Boyd as Nita Daventry
- Richard Cooper as Tony Cosgrave
- Michael Shepley as George Despard
- Jane Carr as Cleo Despard
- Geraldine Fitzgerald as Evelyn Daventry
- Sebastian Shaw as Trent
- Felix Aylmer as Lord Yardleigh
- Bobbie Comber as Andrews

== Reception ==
The Monthly Film Bulletin wrote: "Michael Hogan, in a good part, makes a hit in this film, and whole cast plays well. The action is smooth, and the production polished. The plot is an interesting one, but the ending is something of an anti-climax."

Picturegoer wrote: "An artificial and rather boring story dealing with a by-election. Dialogue is very poor and the threads of the plot too involved and pedestrian to be interesting."
