= Beauty and the Barge (1937 film) =

British film by Henry Edwards

- Gordon Harker and Judy Gunnin the film
- Directed by: Henry Edwards
- Written by: Edwin Greenwood; H. Fowler Mear
- Based on: Beauty and the Barge by W. W. Jacobs and Louis N. Parker
- Produced by: Julius Hagen
- Starring: Gordon Harker; Judy Gunn; Jack Hawkins; George Carney
- Cinematography: Sydney Blythe; William Luff
- Edited by: Michael C. Chorlton
- Music by: W.L. Trytel
- Production company: Twickenham Studios
- Distributed by: Associated British
- Release date: 9 February 1937
- Running time: 77 minutes
- Country: United Kingdom
- Language: English

Beauty and the Barge is a 1937 British comedy film directed by Henry Edwards and starring Gordon Harker, Judy Gunn and Jack Hawkins. It was written by Edwin Greenwood and H. Fowler Mear based on the 1905 play Beauty and the Barge by W. W. Jacobs and Louis N. Parker.

It was produced by Julius Hagen's production company Twickenham Film Studios, and made at the Riverside Studios in Hammersmith.

== Plot ==
Bargee Captain Barley and young Navy Lieutenant Seton Boyne visit hot-tempered Major Smedley’s house, Barley to woo the housekeeper, Mrs Baldwin, and Boyne to court the Major’s daughter, Ethel. Facing her father’s displeasure for rejecting his choice of husband, Ethel begs Barley to secret her away to London aboard his barge. Thinking she is in love with him, Barley agrees. However, Boyne overhears their plan, joins the crew in disguise, and smuggles Mrs Baldwin aboard too. En route, Boyne outwits Barley, winning Ethel’s hand and appeasing her irate father.

== Cast ==
- Gordon Harker as Captain Barley
- Judy Gunn as Ethel Smedley
- Jack Hawkins as Lieutenant Seton Boyne
- George Carney as Tom Codd
- Margaret Rutherford as Mrs Baldwin
- Ronald Shiner as Augustus
- Michael Shepley as Hebert Manners
- Margaret Yarde as Mrs Porton
- Sebastian Smith as Major Smedley
- Margaret Scudamore as Mrs Smedley
- Ann Wemyss as Lucy Dallas

== Reception ==
Kine Weekly wrote: "The story as a story is, of course, slightly tinged with age, but its simple fun nevertheless retains much of its pristine freshness; it is preserved by the salty wit of the author and the fruity humour of Gordon Harker. It should have no difficulty in bringing enjoyment to the he industrial and family element."

The Daily Film Renter wrote: "This effort ambles along at a leisurely pace, while a number of the gags seem more redolent of the Queen Anne period than the 'Jacobean.' Gordon Harker is the mainspring of the film, although, ironically enough, he is not particularly well cast. ... Stellar devotees will probably find Harker's presence in the cast a good reason for secing the picture, while the masses should be agreeably entertained at times during the unspooling."
