= D'Ye Ken John Peel? =

1935 British film by Henry Edwards

- Opening titles
- Directed by: Henry Edwards
- Written by: Charles Cullum; H. Fowler Mear
- Produced by: Julius Hagen
- Starring: John Garrick; Winifred Shotter; Stanley Holloway
- Cinematography: Sydney Blythe
- Edited by: Lister Laurance
- Music by: W.L. Trytel
- Production company: Julius Hagen Productions
- Distributed by: Associated Producers & Distributors
- Release date: 22 July 1935
- Running time: 81 minutes
- Country: United Kingdom
- Language: English

D'Ye Ken John Peel? (also known as John Peel; United States title: Captain Moonlight) is a 1935 British adventure film directed by Henry Edwards and starring John Garrick, Winifred Shotter and Stanley Holloway. It was written by Charles Cullum and H. Fowler Mear, and was made at Julius Hagen's Twickenham Studios. Its name is derived from the traditional hunting song of the same name. The film's sets were designed by the art director James A. Carter.

== Synopsis ==
Major John Peel returns to England from serving in the Napoleonic Wars to discover that his friend Lucy Merrall is now engaged to be married to local villain Sir Charles Hawksley.

== Cast ==
- John Garrick as Major John Peel
- Winifred Shotter as Lucy Merrall
- Stanley Holloway as Sam Small
- John Stuart as Captain Moonlight / Captain Freeman
- Leslie Perrins as Sir Charles Hawksley / Mr. Craven
- Mary Lawson as Toinette
- Charles Carson as Francis Merrall
- Wilfrid Caithness as Latimer
- Morris Harvey as Glover
- Gabrielle Casartelli as Lizzie
- O. B. Clarence as Ogleby
- Charles Eaton
- Cameron Hall
- Peta Mannering
- Pat Noonan
- Ralph Truman as 1st ruffian footman

== Critical reception ==
The Daily Film Renter wrote: "Evidently intended as a rollicking and adventurous story of the 'good old days,' this film fails to achieve its purpose by reason of a highly coloured, melodramatic story and ineptly introduced songs and comedy. ... Entertainment for unsophisticated patrons only."

Picture Show wrote: "This film is not only British made but British in every way. The famous John Peel is the central figure in a rollicking stery of high adventure starting with British officers celebrating the victory of Waterloo. The story is told with plenty of song and we have all the ingredients for robust melodrama. John Garrick gives a stirring performance as Major John Peel, John Stuart is a very dashing highwayman, and Leslie Perrins is a villain of the old-time sort."

Film critic David Parkinson, writing in The Radio Times, gave the film 2 stars out of 5 and called the film a "a crusty old melodrama in the Tod Slaughter tradition", with Leslie Perrins "chewing the scenery with a delicious lack of restraint". He summarised: "This is anything but a lost classic, but there is the chance to see Stanley Holloway as Sam Small, the character he adopted for so many of his famous monologues."
