= Ruffels Pictures =

British film distribution outfit

Ruffels Pictures was a British film distribution outfit during the silent era. The company often handled films produced at Kew Bridge Studios. Julius Hagen, later the owner of Twickenham Studios, was employed as a salesman for Ruffels in his earlier career.

== Bibliography ==
- Low, Rachael. The History of the British Film, 1918-1929. George Allen & Unwin, 1971.
- Richards, Jeffrey (ed.). The Unknown 1930s: An Alternative History of the British Cinema, 1929– 1939. I.B. Tauris & Co, 1998.
