= Michael Shepley =

British actor (1907–1961)

- Publicity still, autographed 1950
- Born: 29 September 1907; Plymouth, Devon, England, UK
- Died: 28 September 1961 (aged 53); London, England, UK
- Occupation: Actor
- Years active: 1929–1961
- Spouse(s): Evelyn Mary Patricia (m. 19??)

Arthur Michael Shepley-Smith (29 September 1907 – 28 September 1961), known professionally as Michael Shepley, was a British actor, appearing in theatre, film, and some television between 1929 and 1961. He played Inspector Stark, in the 1957 television series, Dick and the Duchess.

He was born in Plymouth, Devon. Shepley made his screen début in the 1931 Twickenham Studios film Black Coffee. He went on to appear in more than sixty films, the last of which was Don't Bother to Knock in 1961, the year of his death.

== Filmography ==
- Black Coffee (1931) - Raynor
- A Shot in the Dark (1933) - Vivien Waugh
- Bella Donna (1934) - Dr, Baring-Hartley
- Tangled Evidence (1934) - Gilbert Morfield
- Lord Edgware Dies (1934) - Captain Roland Marsh
- Are You a Mason? (1934) - Ernest Monison
- The Green Pack (1934) - Mark Elliott
- Open All Night (1934) - Hilary
- The Rocks of Valpre (1935) - Trevor Mordaunt
- Lazybones (1935) - Hildebrand Pope
- The Triumph of Sherlock Holmes (1935) - Cecil Barker
- The Lad (1935) - Arthur Maddeley
- That's My Uncle (1935) - Charlie Cookson
- Squibs (1935) - Colin Barratt
- Vintage Wine (1935) - Richard Emsley
- Jubilee Window (1935) - Dacres
- The Ace of Spades (1935) - George Despard
- The Private Secretary (1935) - Henry Marsland
- In the Soup (1936) - Paul Hemming
- Dishonour Bright (1936) - Spooner (uncredited)
- Beauty and the Barge (1937) - Hebert Manners
- Housemaster (1938) - Victor Beamish
- It's in the Air (1938) - Adjutant
- Crackerjack (1938) - Wally Astill (uncredited)
- Goodbye, Mr. Chips (1939) - Teacher (uncredited)
- Contraband (1940) - Man in Club (uncredited)
- Quiet Wedding (1941) - Marcia's Husband
- The Great Mr. Handel (1942) - Sir Charles Marsham
- Women Aren't Angels (1943) - Misunderstood gent (uncredited)
- The Demi-Paradise (1943) - Mr. Walford
- Henry V (1944) - Captain Gower - Captain in the English Army
- I Live in Grosvenor Square (1945) - Lt. Lutyens
- A Place of One's Own (1945) - Maj. Manning Tutthorn
- The Life and Adventures of Nicholas Nickleby (1947) - Mr. Gregsbury M.P.
- Mine Own Executioner (1947) - Peter Edge
- Elizabeth of Ladymead (1948) - Major Wrigley (1903)
- Maytime in Mayfair (1949) - Shepherd
- Mr. Denning Drives North (1952) - Chairman of Court
- Secret People (1952) - Manager of the British Pavilion
- Home at Seven (1952) - Major Watson
- You Know What Sailors Are (1954) - Admiral
- Trouble in the Glen (1954) - Man (uncredited)
- Happy Ever After (1954) - Major McGlusky
- Where There's a Will (1955) - Mr. Cogent
- Doctor at Sea (1955) - Jill's father
- An Alligator Named Daisy (1955) - The judge
- Strange Experiences (1956) – The Gambler
- My Teenage Daughter (1956) - Sir Henry
- Dry Rot (1956) - Col. Wagstaff
- The Passionate Stranger (1957) - Miles Easter
- Not Wanted on Voyage (1957) - Col. Blewton-Fawcett
- Dunkirk (1958) - Bit Role (uncredited)
- Gideon's Day (1958) - Sir Rupert
- Upgreen - And at 'Em (1960)
- Just Joe (1960) - Fowler
- Double Bunk (1961) - Granville-Carter
- Don't Bother to Knock (1961) - Colonel (final film role)

== Selected stage credits ==
- The Midshipmaid by Ian Hay and Stephen King-Hall (1931)
- Orders Are Orders by Ian Hay and Anthony Armstrong (1932)
- A Present from Margate by Ian Hay and A.E.W. Mason (1933)
- Night Must Fall by Emlyn Williams (1936)
- The Man in Half Moon Street by Barré Lyndon (1939)
- Love in a Mist by Kenneth Horne (1941)
- Escort by Patrick Hastings (1942)
- The Druid's Rest by Emlyn Williams (1944)
- The Chiltern Hundreds by William Douglas-Home (1947)
- His Excellency by Campbell Christie and Dorothy Christie (1950)
- The Happy Marriage by John Clements (1952)

== Cricket ==
Shepley was an opening batsman, playing for Westminster from 1923 to 1926, as captain in 1926. In 1925 his batting average was at 33.11, the highest of the team, scoring 88 against Malvern. He played in the Oxford Freshmen's match in 1927.
