= The Lad =

1935 film

- British trade ad
- Directed by: Henry Edwards
- Written by: Edgar Wallace (novel); Gerard Fairlie
- Produced by: Julius Hagen
- Starring: Gordon Harker; Betty Stockfeld; Jane Carr; Geraldine Fitzgerald
- Cinematography: Sydney Blythe
- Music by: W.L. Trytel
- Production company: Twickenham Studios
- Distributed by: Universal Pictures
- Release date: 27 February 1935
- Running time: 72 minutes
- Country: United Kingdom
- Language: English

The Lad is a 1935 British comedy film directed by Henry Edwards and starring Gordon Harker, Betty Stockfeld and Jane Carr. It was written by Gerard Fairlie from a story by Edgar Wallace, and was made at Twickenham Studios.

== Plot ==
Bill Shane is The Lad, an opportunistic petty criminal mistaken for a private detective. When Shane arrives at a remote country estate, he is offered much money not to delve into the private affairs of the Fandon family. Shane is all for taking the money and duping the family, but on being reunited with ex-girlfriend Pauline, now the Fandons' maid, he decides to turn over a new leaf.

== Cast ==
- Gordon Harker as Bill Shane aka The Lad
- Betty Stockfeld as Lady Fandon
- Jane Carr as Pauline Grant
- Michael Shepley as Arthur Maddeley
- Gerald Barry as Lord Fandon
- Geraldine Fitzgerald as Joan Fandon
- Sebastian Shaw as Jimmy
- John Turnbull as Inspector Martin
- Ralph Truman as O'Shea
- David Hawthorne as Major Grannitt
- Wilfrid Caithness as Tanner
- Barbara Everest as Mrs. Lorraine

== Critical reception ==
Kine Weekly wrote: "Gordon Harker is in irresistible form as The Lad, such is his flair for cockney character-drawing that he is able to bring human interest as well as comedy to the part. ... Bright ingenious story, great performance by Gordon Harker, smart dialogue, adequate support and powerful title and star values"

The Radio Times wrote, "Gordon Harker was such a favourite of crime writer Edgar Wallace that he frequently had material especially tailored for him. It's hardly surprising, therefore, that the actor is totally at home in this serviceable adaptation of one of Wallace's most popular thrillers... Director Henry Edwards wisely keeps the action brisk and on the light side, as the mystery is hardly baffling and the performances are painfully stiff."
