= The Passing of Mr. Quin =

1928 film

- Directed by: Leslie S. Hiscott; Julius Hagen
- Written by: Agatha Christie (short story); Leslie S. Hiscott
- Produced by: Julius Hagen
- Starring: Stewart Rome; Trilby Clark; Ursula Jeans; Clifford Heatherley
- Cinematography: Horace Wheddon
- Production company: Strand Films
- Distributed by: Argosy Films
- Release date: July 1928
- Running time: 100 minutes
- Country: United Kingdom
- Languages: Silent; English intertitles

The Passing of Mr. Quin is a 1928 British mystery film which was co-directed by Leslie S. Hiscott and Julius Hagen, starring Clifford Heatherley, Mary Brough and Ursula Jeans. The film was based on the short story The Coming of Mr. Quin, part of the collection The Mysterious Mr. Quin, which was written by Agatha Christie. It was the first British film to be made of one of Christie's works. The short story was adapted by Hiscott, who would in 1931 direct Alibi, the first film to feature Christie's more well known Belgian detective Hercule Poirot. The film was made at Twickenham Studios in London.

== Plot ==
Professor Appleby has terrorised his wife, Eleanor, but when he is murdered, and her lover, Derek goes missing, Eleanor suspects the worst. A mysterious stranger, known as 'Mr Quinny' or 'Mr Quin' appears, and begins to seduce Eleanor, but his alcoholism takes over and he dies. Before dying, he reveals that he was Derek all along, and offers the girl to a rival, who promises to make Eleanor a happy wife.

== Partial cast ==
- Stewart Rome as Dr. Alec Portal
- Trilby Clark as Mrs. Eleanor Appleby
- Ursula Jeans as Vera, the Maid
- Clifford Heatherley as Prof. Appleby
- Mary Brough as Cook
- Vivian Baron as Derek Cappel
- Kate Gurney as Landlady

The screenplay was novelised by G. Roy McRae (thought to be a pseudonym) for issue in 1929. The plot deviates radically from Christie's short story (for example, whereas Christie's Mr Quin is a romantic fantasy figure who solves the mystery of Professor Appleby's suicide, Mr Quin is here portrayed as Appleby's alcoholic murderer).

== Bibliography ==
- Low, Rachel. The History of British Film: Volume IV, 1918–1929. Routledge, 1997.
