= Somehow Good =

1927 film

- Directed by: Jack Raymond
- Written by: William De Morgan (play); Lydia Hayward
- Produced by: John Sloane
- Starring: Fay Compton; Stewart Rome; Dorothy Boyd; Colin Keith-Johnston
- Production company: Film Manufacturing Company
- Distributed by: Pathé Pictures International
- Release date: 31 October 1927
- Running time: 7,973 feet
- Country: United Kingdom
- Language: English

Somehow Good is a 1927 British silent drama film directed by Jack Raymond and starring Fay Compton, Stewart Rome and Dorothy Boyd. It was made at Twickenham Studios and premiered in October 1927.

== Cast ==
- Fay Compton as Rosalind Nightingale
- Stewart Rome as Jerry Harrison
- Dorothy Boyd as Sally
- Colin Keith-Johnston as Doctor
- Frank Perfitt as Dederich
- J. Fisher White as Old Fossil

== Bibliography ==
- Low, Rachel. The History of British Film: Volume IV, 1918–1929. Routledge, 1997.
