= Lily of Killarney (1934 film) =

1934 film by Maurice Elvey

- Trade advertisement
- Directed by: Maurice Elvey
- Written by: H. Fowler Mear
- Based on: play by Dion Boucicault
- Produced by: Julius Hagen
- Starring: John Garrick; Gina Malo; Leslie Perrins; Stanley Holloway
- Cinematography: Sydney Blythe; William Luff
- Edited by: Jack Harris
- Music by: W.L. Trytel
- Production company: Twickenham Studios
- Distributed by: Associated Producers & Distributors
- Release date: 13 August 1934
- Running time: 88 minutes
- Country: United Kingdom
- Language: English

Lily of Killarney (also known as Bride of the Lake) is a 1934 British musical film directed by Maurice Elvey and starring John Garrick, Gina Malo and Leslie Perrins. It was written by H. Fowler Mear based on the 1860 play The Colleen Bawn by the Irish writer Dion Boucicault. The film was made at Twickenham Studios with sets designed by the art director James A. Carter.

== Plot ==
Norah Creegan has heavily mortgaged her ancestral home to Sir James Corrigan, a ne're-do-well solicitor. To recover the debt she plans to marry her son Hardress to heiress Ann Chute. But Hardress has already secretly wed local girl Eileen O'Connor. Ann is in love with Hardress's friend Daly, but she thinks it is Daly who is secretly married, rather than Hardress. When Hardress's servant Danny attempts to murder Eileen, Ann discovers the truth about Daly. Delighted that he is single, Ann offers to pay off the Creegan mortgage, as a belated wedding present for Hardress and Eileen.

== Cast ==
- John Garrick as Sir Patrick Creegan
- Gina Malo as Eileen O'Connor
- Leslie Perrins as Sir James Corrigan
- Dennis Hoey as Myles-Na-Copaleen
- Stanley Holloway as Father O'Flynn
- Sara Allgood as Mrs. O'Connor
- D.J. Williams as Danny Mann
- Hughes Macklin as Shan, the shepherd
- John Mortimer as Tim O'Brien
- Dorothy Boyd as Norah Creegan
- Pat Noonan as Chief Constable James Collins
- A. Bromley Davenport as Lord Kenmore
- Pat Williams
- Percy Honri
- Pamela May as Ann Chute
- The Sherman Fisher Girls

== Reception ==
Kine Weekly wrote: "An adaptation of Dion Boucicault's stage play, The Colleen Bawn, which has a novelettish story and one that fails to occasion any great interest. The individual characterisation, with the exception of the two juvenile leads, is effective; but the pictorial appeal, while good, is not so strong as it might have been considering that the producer actually took certain sections in Northern Ireland. However, despite the weaknesses, the picture should satisfy the unsophisticated."

The Daily Film Renter wrote: "Robust action, traditional ballads and picturesque scenery. Maurice Elvey's clear-cut direction exacts every ounce of entertainment value from material, achieving attractive blend of drama, comedy and romance. Leading players enact their roles with great gusto and sincerity."

In The Monthly Film Bulletin the Religious Films Viewing Committee wrote: "This film, which is vulgar in the extreme, tends to glorify gambling and drinking, and shows a Roman Catholic priest in a very poor light. For religious purposes the film has no value whatsoever and in fact would be definitely harmful."
