= The Last Journey =

- Directed by: Bernard Vorhaus
- Written by: John Soutar; H. Fowler Mear; Joseph Jefferson Farjeon
- Produced by: Julius Hagen
- Starring: Godfrey Tearle; Hugh Williams; Judy Gunn; Mickey Brantford
- Cinematography: William Luff; Percy Strong
- Edited by: Lister Laurance
- Music by: William Trytel
- Production company: Twickenham Studios
- Distributed by: Twickenham Film Distributors (UK); Atlantic Pictures Corporation (US)
- Release date: 1936
- Running time: 66 minutes
- Country: United Kingdom
- Language: English

The Last Journey is a 1936 British drama film directed by Bernard Vorhaus and starring Godfrey Tearle, Hugh Williams and Judy Gunn. It was written by John Soutar, H. Fowler Mear and Joseph Jefferson Farjeon.

== Synopsis ==
A train driver on his last journey before retirement thinks his fireman is having an affair with his wife. The driver intends to kill himself and his passengers by crashing the train. The train is filled with colourful characters, including a psychoanalyst who persuades the driver not to do it.

== Cast ==
- Godfrey Tearle as Sir Wilfred Rhodes
- Hugh Williams as Gerald Winter
- Judy Gunn as Diana Gregory
- Mickey Brantford as Tom
- Julien Mitchell as Bob Holt
- Olga Lindo as Mrs. Holt
- Michael Hogan as Charlie
- Frank Pettingell as Goddard
- Eliot Makeham as Pip
- Eve Gray as Daisy

== Production ==
The film was made at Twickenham Studios as a quota quickie.

== Critical reception ==
Film Weekly wrote: "Competently narrated and capably acted, this is an unassuming little picture that is quite sound entertainment of its type. ... Bernard Vorhaus has kept a firm control over the rather complicated threads of the story; and, as usual, his work is marked by intelligent touches that suggest he will one day make an outstanding film."

The Monthly Film Bulletin wrote: "Suspense is well-maintained and the climax is thrilling. The acting generally is on a high level though opportunities in this type of plot are obviously limited. The direction is skilful and imaginative and the camera work is good."

Variety wrote: "Godfrey Tearle makes a sincere, dignified figure as the psychoanalyst, with the rest of the characters well etched. Julien Mitchell hardly conveys the intense devotion to his wife which would warrant the jeopardizing of the lives of a number of people, but his moments of frenzy are real enough."

The New York Times wrote, "there are some engaging directorial touches, and there is some excellent photography."

Britmovie noted a "gripping low-budget b-movie portmanteau thriller featuring fast-cutting from director Bernard Vorhaus and impressive location shooting on the Great Western Railway."
