= Called Back (1933 film) =

1933 British film by Reginald Denham

- Theatrical release poster
- Directed by: Reginald Denham; Jack Harris
- Based on: novel by Hugh Conway
- Produced by: Julius Hagen
- Starring: Franklin Dyall; Lester Matthews; Dorothy Boyd
- Production company: Real Art Productions
- Distributed by: RKO Radio Pictures
- Release date: February 1933
- Running time: 50 minutes
- Country: United Kingdom
- Language: English

Called Back is a 1933 British crime film directed by Reginald Denham and Jack Harris and starring Franklin Dyall, Lester Matthews and Dorothy Boyd. It was based on Hugh Conway's 1883 novel of the same title, and was a quota quickie made at Twickenham Studios.

== Preservation status ==
The British Film Institute National Archive holds a collection of ephemera and stills but no film or video materials.

== Plot ==
Wealthy young Englishman Gilbert Vaughan, recovering from an operation to restore his sight after blindness, meets and marries Pauline March. Knowing that there is something mysterious in her past, he neverthelss abides by the wishes of her uncle, Dr. Manuel, not to investigate. When Manuel's associate Santos Macari visits Gilbert and Pauline and gives a clue to the mystery, Gilbert travels to Siberia, where Manuel has been condemned to death by firing squad for counter-revolutionary activities, to finally get the truth from him.

== Cast ==
- Franklin Dyall as Dr. Jose Manuel
- Lester Matthews as Gilbert Vaughan
- Dorothy Boyd as Pauline March
- Alexander Sarner as Santos Macari
- Anthony Ireland as Anthony March
- Francis L. Sullivan as Kaledin
- Ian Fleming as Dr. Carter
- Margaret Emden as Priscilla
- Geoffrey Goodheart as Ivan

== Reception ==
Kine Weekly wrote: "Crime drama a little fantastic an in theme, competently portrayed by a cast of established stage favourites. The story is told partly in retrospect, and the device secures adequate suspense which in torn stimulates interest and leads to holding sitaations."

The Daily Film Renter wrote: "Rather unconvincing narrative redeemed by powerful acting of leading players. Uneven direction detracts from maximum effect of gripping situations, Photography and sound are excellent. Will be acceptable to not too critical audiences."

Picture Show wrote: "Somewhat far-fetched crime drama, well acted, if not always convincing."
