= The Vicar of Bray (film) =

1937 film by Henry Edwards

- Opening title card
- Directed by: Henry Edwards
- Written by: Anson Dyer; H. Fowler Mear
- Produced by: Julius Hagen
- Starring: Stanley Holloway; Hugh Miller; Felix Aylmer
- Cinematography: William Luff
- Music by: Marcus De Wolfe
- Production company: Twickenham Film Studios
- Distributed by: Twickenham Film Distributors
- Release date: 9 May 1937
- Running time: 68 minutes
- Country: United Kingdom
- Language: English

The Vicar of Bray is a 1937 British historical film with songs, directed by Henry Edwards, and starring Stanley Holloway, Hugh Miller, Felix Aylmer and Margaret Vines. It was written by Anson Dyer and H. Fowler Mear, and was produced by Julius Hagen at Twickenham Film Studios.

== Preservation status ==
The British Film Institute National Archive holds the film.

== Plot ==
During a visit from his governor in Ireland the Earl of Brendon, Charles I asks advice on finding a new tutor for his wayward son Prince Charles and accepts Brendon's recommendation of the vicar of Bray, County Wicklow. On returning to Ireland Brendon passes on news of the appointment to the vicar, who travels to London to take up the post, promising to return one day. He falls asleep during his first lesson with the Prince, allowing the latter to slip away to see his actress lover Meg Clancy. The vicar follows the Prince and mildly reprimands him before they are reconciled.

Just before the outbreak of the English Civil War, the vicar heads back to Bray, gaining a promise from his friend the Prince that he will rule mercifully when he succeeds his father. Meanwhile the Royalist Brendon finally breaks from his Parliamentarian friend Sir Richard Melross, whose son Dennis seeks the vicar's help to be married to his childhood sweetheart Norah, Brendon's daughter. The vicar accepts but Brendon discovers and breaks up the wedding ceremony before it is complete. Sir Richard is killed in the war, Charles I is executed and Dennis and Oliver Cromwell find themselves in Ireland. In a meeting arranged by Dennis, the vicar uses his blarney to convince Cromwell that he is apolitical and thus worthy of exemption from a decree dismissing all clergy appointed by Charles I.

News of the imminent Restoration reaches Ireland and Dennis accepts the vicar's entreaties not to oppose it. However, he ignores his advice to flee straight to France and instead is captured in a failed attempt to spring Norah from Brendon's castle, before being sent to the Tower of London to await execution. The vicar and Norah manage to reach Dover, where the new king has just landed. The vicar reminds him of his promise to him just before the war and gains a pardon from him for Dennis, who swears loyalty to the new king.

== Cast ==
- Stanley Holloway as The Vicar of Bray
- Hugh Miller as Charles I
- K. Hamilton Price as Prince Charles
- Felix Aylmer as Earl of Brendon
- Margaret Vines as Lady Norah Brendon, the Earl's daughter
- Garry Marsh as Sir Richard Melross
- Esmond Knight as Dennis Melross, Sir Richard's son
- George Merritt as Oliver Cromwell (uncredited)
- Martin Walker as Sir Patrick Condon, the Earl's Royalist ally and failed suitor to Norah
- Eve Gray as Meg Clancy, an actress and Prince Charles' lover
- Kitty Kirwan as Molly, the vicar's maid
- Fred O'Donovan as Tim Connor, the vicar's servant

== Music ==
Songs include the melody and first verse of the traditional English song which gives the film its title, along with a new verse on Cromwell's rule.

== Reception ==
The Monthly Film Bulletin wrote: "The film is episodic in treatment, but Stanley Holloway brings the Vicar very much to life and saves the film from being merely an elaborate costume piece. Hugh Miller makes a fittingly dignified Charles I and the scenes in Ireland and London are full of crowded life. The sound recording errs on the noisy side."

Variety wrote: "Good atmospheric romantic melordama, with singing, intelligently strung together ... Picture serves to bring forward in a semi-serious role the personality of Stanley Holloway, best known here as a revue performer and mimic. He has a rich voice and is possessed of considerable unction. ... Authenticity of the British history contained in the film is not altogether correct, but that does not interfere with the entertainment. Some good acting by standard players, but the bit parts are brutally interpreted: Still, the production will do."

In a 2018 review the Radio Times gave the film two out of five stars, writing "Mercifully this period drama is the kind of film they don't make any more, but it's not without moments of interest as a historical artefact," with the reviewer concluding "The songs are ghastly and the period trappings cheap and inaccurate, but Felix Aylmer and Garry Marsh go some way towards atoning for the film's deficiencies."

TV Guide also rated the film two out of five stars, noting "An entertaining role for Holloway, but the accompanying musical numbers are pretty sour."
