= White Lilac =

1935 film

- Percy Marmont, Basil Sydney and Judy Gunn in the film
- Directed by: Albert Parker
- Based on: Lilas Blanc by Ladislas Fodor
- Produced by: Ernest Gartside
- Starring: Basil Sydney; Judy Gunn; Claude Dampier
- Cinematography: Alex Bryce
- Production company: Fox Film
- Distributed by: Fox Film
- Release date: 4 June 1935
- Running time: 67 minutes
- Country: United Kingdom
- Language: English

White Lilac is a 1935 British mystery film directed by Albert Parker and starring Basil Sydney, Judy Gunn, Claude Dampier and Percy Marmont. It was written by Ladislas Fodor based on his play Lilas Blanc, and was made at Wembley Studios as a quota quickie by the British subsidiary of Fox Film.

== Preservation status ==
The British Film Institute National Archive holds a collection of stills but no film or video materials.

== Plot ==
Fred Iredale, an unpopular deceitful womaniser, is found dead under suspicious circumstances. Given his long history of making enemies, there are many suspects. Initially, the police arrest his valet, Parks – a man with a criminal record – but the investigation soon also includes two young women: Muriel, the daughter of the senior detective, and Mollie, who is engaged to the lawyer defending Parks. Later, when Iredale's death is ruled accidental, Muriel and Mollie are able to provide each other with the alibis necessary to clear their names.

== Cast ==
- Basil Sydney as Ian Mackie
- Judy Gunn as Mollie
- Claude Dampier as Percy
- Percy Marmont as Tollitt
- Gwenllian Gill as Muriel
- Leslie Perrins as Fred Iredale
- Constance Travers as Jessie
- Billy Holland as Harvey
- Marjorie Hume as Mrs Lyall

== Reception ==
The Daily Film Renter wrote: "Rather novelettish plot is decked out with customary red herring clues ... Comedy interpolations by Claude Dampier, and telling emotionalism of Judy Gunn and Gwen Gill are main entertainment bids."

Kine Weekly wrote: "Popular mixture of crime comedy and romance, efficiently directed and attractively staged. The story is not exactly original, but it has some claim to ingenuity, and makes excellent openings for the inimitable comedy of Claude Dampier, who not only steals the picture but makes it."

Picture Show wrote: "Once again we are presented with the somewhat familiar theme of a really nasty villain who is murdered and many who would be glad to see him dead, with resultant suspicion falling on them. It is quite well developed, however, and the cast Is good."
