= Leslie Perrins =

English actor (1901–1962)

- Born: 7 October 1901; Moseley, Birmingham, Warwickshire, England
- Died: 13 December 1962 (aged 61); Esher, Surrey, England
- Education: RADA
- Occupation: Actor
- Years active: 1922-1961

Leslie Perrins (7 October 1901 – 13 December 1962) was an English actor who often played villains. After training at RADA, he was on stage from 1922, and in his long career, appeared in well over 60 films.

== Personal life ==
Perrins and wife Violet were dog lovers: he was a judge at Crufts in 1957, and president of the Welsh Corgi League from 1956 until his death. Their annual award, "The Leslie Perrins Memorial Trophy," is named after him.

He wrote a book called Keeping a Corgi, which was published in 1958.

== Filmography ==
- The Sleeping Cardinal (1931) as Ronald Adair (film debut)
- The House of Unrest (1931) as Cleaver
- The Rosary (1931) as Ronald Overton
- The Calendar (1931) as Henry Lascarne
- Betrayal (1932) as Clive Wilson
- White Face (1932) as Louis Landor
- The Lost Chord (1933) as Count Carol Zara
- Leave It to Smith (1933) as Duke of Bristol
- Early to Bed (1933) as Mayer
- The Pointing Finger (1933) as Honorable James Mallory
- The Roof (1933) as Inspector Darrow
- The Scotland Yard Mystery (1934) as John Freeman
- Lily of Killarney (1934) as Sir James Corrigan
- The Man Who Changed His Name (1934) as Frank Ryan
- The Lash (1934) as Alec Larkin
- Song at Eventide (1934) as Ricardo
- Lord Edgware Dies (1934) as Bryan Martin
- Gay Love (1934) as Gerald Sparkes
- Womanhood (1934) as Richard Brent
- Open All Night (1934) as Ranger
- D'Ye Ken John Peel? (1935) as Sir Charles Hawksley / Mr. Craven
- The Rocks of Valpre (1935) as Captain Rodolphe
- The Triumph of Sherlock Holmes (1935) as John Douglas
- The Village Squire (1935) as Richard Venables
- The White Lilac (1935) as Iredale
- The Silent Passenger (1935) as Maurice Windermere
- Lucky Days (1935) as Jack Hurst
- Line Engaged (1935) as Gordon Rutland
- Expert's Opinion (1935) as Richard Steele
- Sunshine Ahead (1936) as The Critic
- The Shadow of Mike Emerald (1936) as Mike Emerald
- They Didn't Know (1936) as Duval
- Tudor Rose (1936) as Thomas Seymour
- Rhythm in the Air (1936) as Mr. David, Dance Director
- Southern Roses (1936) as Don Ramon
- The Limping Man (1936) as Paul Hoyt
- No Escape (1936) as Anthony Wild
- Sensation (1936) as Strange
- The Price of Folly (1937) as Owen
- Bulldog Drummond at Bay (1937) as Maj. Grayson
- Secret Lives (1937) as J 14
- The High Command (1937) as Maj. Carson
- Mr. Reeder in Room 13 (1938) as Jeffrey Legge, alias Maj. Jeffrey Floyd
- Romance à la carte (1938) as Louis
- No Parking (1938) as Captain Sneyd
- His Lordship Goes to Press (1938) - Sir Richard Swingleton
- Calling All Crooks (1938) as Duvane
- Luck of the Navy (1938) as Briggs
- The Gables Mystery (1938) as Inspector Lloyd
- Old Iron (1938) as Richard Penshaw
- The Gang's All Here (1939) as Harper
- Wanted by Scotland Yard (1939) as Standish
- I Killed the Count (1939) as Count Mattoni
- Blind Folly (1939) as Deverell
- All at Sea (1940) as Williams
- The Prime Minister (1941) as Earl of Salisbury (uncredited)
- Suspected Person (1942) as Tony Garrett
- Women Aren't Angels (1943) as Schaffer
- Heaven Is Round the Corner (1944) as Robert Sedley
- I'll Turn to You (1946) as Mr. Chigwell
- The Turners of Prospect Road (1947) as Mr. Webster
- The Idol of Paris (1948) as Count Paiva
- It's Hard to Be Good (1948) as Major Gordon (uncredited)
- Man on the Run (1949) as Charlie
- A Run for Your Money (1949) as Burney
- Midnight Episode (1950) as Charles Mason
- The Lost Hours (1952) as Doctor Morrison
- Souls in Conflict (1954)
- Guilty? (1956) as Poynter
- Fortune Is a Woman (1957) as Chairman of Tribunal (uncredited)
- The Haunted Strangler (1958) as Newgate Prison Governor (final film)
