= Oh No Doctor! =

- Directed by: George King
- Written by: George King
- Starring: Jack Hobbs; Dorothy Boyd; James Finlayson
- Edited by: Al Barnes
- Production company: George King Productions
- Distributed by: Metro-Goldwyn-Mayer
- Release date: 6 February 1934
- Running time: 62 minutes
- Country: United Kingdom
- Language: English

Oh No Doctor! is a 1934 British comedy film directed and written by George King and starring Jack Hobbs, Dorothy Boyd and James Finlayson. It was made as a quota quickie for distribution by the American company MGM.

== Plot ==
Young playwright Montague Kent is involved in an accident and told, by a bogus doctor, that he has a weak heart. After breaking off his engagement to Josephine Morrow, he has second thoughts and visits her at her country mansion. Her guardian, Doctor Morrow, has been using her money to fund his research, and hearing that Montague's heart is weak, he decides to frighten him to death, to avoid awkward inquiries about his spending. But Montague survives and wins back Josephine's heart.

== Cast ==
- Jack Hobbs as Montague Kent
- Dorothy Boyd as Josephine Morrow
- James Finlayson as Axminster
- Cecil Humphreys as Doctor Morrow
- Peggy Novak as Tessa Burnett
- Jane Carr as Protheroe
- Abraham Sofaer as Skelton
- David Wilton as Villain

== Reception ==
Kine Weekly wrote: "Comedy extravaganza, a hotchpotch of everything, played at a pace and with an enthusiasm which conceal its bald artlessness. It is the sheer absurdity of the situations, accentuated by the mock seriousness with which they are played by a useful cast, which results in an adequate complement of laughs. ... There is no rhyme or reason in the film; it is its unblushing absurdity which enables it to provide good fun for the masses."

The Daily Film Renter wrote: "No one will pretend that this is world-shattering stuff, but within its limitations it provides a fair share of laughs. The freely burlesqued style in which the players treat their stuff assists the case course of the story, which provides an adequate supply of hilarious situations. At the trade show it kept the audience in fair good humour, and should satisfy uncritical patrons who take their amusement lightly."
