= The Druid's Rest =

1943 play by Emlyn Williams

- Original language: English
- Written by: Emlyn Williams
- Genre: Comedy
- Setting: The Druid's Rest pub, Tan-y-Maes, Wales, present day

Premiere
- Date: 22 November 1943
- Place: Royal Court Theatre, Liverpool

The Druid's Rest is a 1943 comedy play by the British writer Emlyn Williams. Set in his native Wales it was based on memories of village life there. It takes place entirely in The Druid's Rest a bar in a small community who mistakenly believe the man they are sheltering in their village, and need to with the Eisteddfod, is a murderer.

It premiered at the Royal Court Theatre in Liverpool before transferring to St Martin's Theatre in London's West End where it ran for 180 performances between 26 January 1944 and 17 June 1944. The cast included Richard Burton (later replaced by Stanley Baker), Lyn Evans, Roddy Hughes, Michael Shepley, Gladys Henson and Nuna Davey. The play marked the stage debuts of both Burton and Baker.

== Bibliography ==
- Stephens, John Russell. Emlyn Williams: The Making of a Dramatist. Seren, 2000.
- Wearing, J. P. The London Stage 1940–1949: A Calendar of Productions, Performers, and Personnel. Rowman & Littlefield, 2014.
