= Morris Harvey =

British actor (1877–1944)

- 1930s postcard
- Born: Edmond Joseph Morris; 25 September 1877; London, England
- Died: 24 August 1944 (aged 66); Glasgow, Scotland
- Occupations: Actor & writer
- Years active: 1930-1943
- Spouse(s): Dorothy Leon; Mae Bacon

Morris Harvey (25 September 1877 – 24 August 1944) was a British actor and writer. A renowned character actor, he also wrote for the stage, including material for Broadway revues, in which he also appeared. He was the stepfather of film director Anthony Harvey.

== Filmography ==
Year	Title	Role	Notes
1930	The Man from Chicago	Rossi	Film debut
1931	Sunshine Susie	Klapper	
1932	Down Our Street	Bill Collins	
1933	Cash	Meyer	
1933	Facing the Music	De Breen	
1934	A Southern Maid	Vasco	
1934	Sing As We Go	The Cowboy	
1935	D'Ye Ken John Peel?	Glover	
1935	Look Up and Laugh	Rosenbloom	
1935	Squibs	Inspector Lee	
1935	Hello, Sweetheart	F.Q. Morse	
1935	The Love Test	Company President	
1935	Scrooge	Poulterer With Prize Turkey	
1936	In the Soup	Bates	
1936	Crown v. Stevens	Maurice Bayleck	Uncredited
1936	Dreams Come True	Waldemar	
1936	Tropical Trouble	Chief of the Bungs	
1937	The Lilac Domino	Janosch	
1938	The Sky's the Limit	Batavian Ambassador	
1939	The Mysterious Mr. Davis	Cecil Goldenburg	
1940	21 Days	Pawnbroker	
1941	Crook's Tour	Waiter	
1941	Old Mother Riley in Business		
1942	Let the People Sing	Jim Flagg	
1942	The Great Mr. Handel	John Heidegger	
1942	Rose of Tralee	McIsaac	
1943	Old Mother Riley Overseas	Barnacle Bill	Final film
