= Judy Gunn =

British actress (1915–1991)

- Judy Gunn in The Love Test (1935)
- Born: Joan Winfindale; 10 February 1915; Burton upon Trent, Staffordshire, England
- Died: 19 April 1991 (aged 76); London, England
- Years active: 1933–1937

Judy Gunn (born Joan Winfindale; 10 February 1915 – 19 April 1991) was a British stage and film actress.

When she was thirteen, she played a leading role in a local dramatic performance and the following year she went to RADA to study, where she was the youngest pupil. After two years there she was engaged for provincial repertory work and commenced her career with touring companies before starting on the London stage. In 1933 she starred alongside Bobby Howes in the West End musical He Wanted Adventure.

== Filmography ==
- The Roof (1933)
- Lilies of the Field (1934)
- White Lilac (1935)
- Vintage Wine (1935)
- The Riverside Murder (1935)
- The Love Test (1935)
- The Private Secretary (1935)
- The Last Journey (1936)
- In the Soup (1936)
- Beauty and the Barge (1937)
- Silver Blaze (1937)
- The Five Pound Man (1937)
