= Michael C. Chorlton =

British film editor (1913–1951)

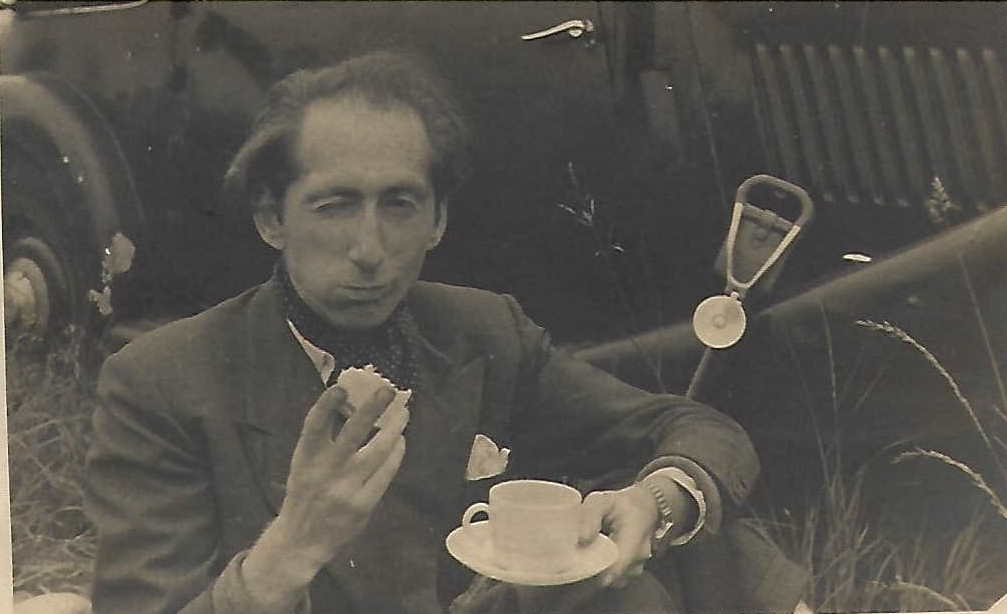
- Born: 27 December 1913
- Died: 25 October 1951 (aged 37)
- Occupations: Film editor, director

Michael C. Chorlton (27 December 1913 – 25 October 1951) was an English film editor and occasional director. He was born in Disley, Cheshire. He particularly worked with Powell and Pressburger, including editing The Silver Fleet and the motorcycle sequences for A Matter of Life and Death

Other films he edited include Juggernaut, Love on the Dole, The Volunteer, the Charters and Caldicott vehicle Crook's Tour and The Day Will Dawn.

Chorlton died in a plane crash near Shottesbrooke, Berkshire in his own plane on 25 October 1951. He was on a flight from the West London Aero Club, White Waltham with a local man.

Chorlton's first race was in 1945 in the very early days of the Motorsport which would later be known as F1.

His interest for the sport can be traced back to 1934 when he became a member of the iconic 'Junior Car Club' (JCC) at the famous Brooklands track, shortly after leaving university.

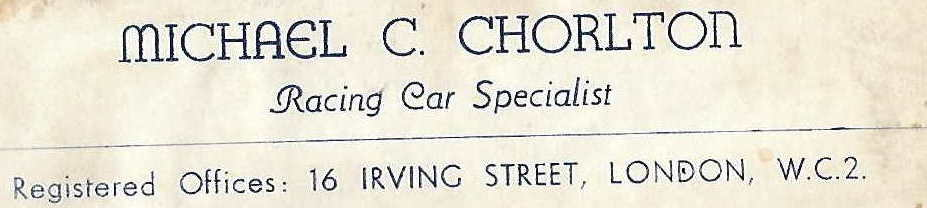
Michael's London office address

It was in 1947 that he formalised his racing career with his own company 'Michael C. Chorlton, Racing Car Specialist', registered at 16 Irving Street, London, W.C.2.

This was his entrance into the Grand Prix establishment and led him to his first, if somewhat aged, 8 cylinder 1933 Bugatti 51A racing car.

Records show that Michael was a 'Bugatti Owner's club' member in May 1948, registered as a competitor at the 'Prescott-Speed Hill Climb' race meeting.

In 1949 he teamed up with 'Centaur developments Ltd', a London company, the principal owners of which were James Boothby (himself a Bugatti race driver), Michael Chorlton and Charles Brookes.

His car, a 1933 51A, can be traced from an entry in a Bugatti book as follows:

"This car was imported to England by Jack Lemon Burton in 1937 and raced by him. It was then a 51A. Later he sold it to M. Chorlton and the car became the Chorlton Special. The 'Autocar' of April 8th 1949 describes the car which was stated to be produced by Centaur Developments Ltd., Chorlton being the designer. The car was entered as a C.D.L. in the 1949 Jersey Race but failed to qualify. Chorlton was killed in an air crash in 1951. Later the car passed through the hands of T.E. Lloyd and was broken up. Precise whereabouts of the pieces unknown."

Chorlton entered the following races:

1. 1945. First Post-War race meeting – Cockfosters Rally
2. 1946. (First Post-War race meeting) – Grandsden Lodge. (Cambridge University Auto Club and Vintage Sports-Car Club)
3. 1946. September – Brighton Speed Trials
4. 1946. 17 October – Jersey Motor-cycle and light car club – Bouley Bay Hill Climb. Finished 2nd
5. 1947. Thursday 8 May 'Jersey International Road Race'. Organised by The Junior Car Club in conjunction with The Jersey M.C. and L.C.C.. Retired with a broken oil pipe. Chorlton's was the only Bugatti entered.
6. 1947. 21 June. Midland Automobile Club, International Speed Hill Climb 'Shelsley Walsh'. Ran out of petrol on the first climb, almost the slowest time of the day on the second climb with inlet valve clearance too short.
7. 'Bari Grand Prix'. Invited but could not attend due to conflicting dates for the filming of 'Miranda'
8. 1947. Sunday 13 July. 'Cambridge University Auto Club and Vintage Sports-Car Club' Joint Invitation Race Meeting, Race No. 6 Bugatti cars. Retired due to a dropped valve in practise.
9. 1947 Thursday 21 August. 'BRDC 9th International British Empire Trophy Race'. Douglas Isle of Man. This was a recognised FIA Formula 1 race. Speeding down a hill the shock absorbers malfunctioned, the rear wheels locked braking on a corner and the car overturned. Pinned under the car Chorlton only suffered cuts and bruises.
10. 1947. 1 September. 'Brighton International Speed Trials'. Only one week after the crash at the Isle of Man Chorlton finished first.
11. 1948. Thursday 29 April. 'Jersey International Road Race', Organised by The Junior Car Club and The Jersey M.C and L.C.C. The car was not ready in time for the start.
12. 1948. Sunday 9 May. 'The eighth open Speed Hill Climb, Prescott'. The first race meeting with the new independent front suspension designed by Chorlton.
13. 1948. Tuesday 25 May,. 'BRDC 10th International British Empire Trophy Race' Douglas, Isle of Man. Finished 8th and received £7 in prize money in spite of complete loss of gear lever (Chorlton shifted ratios using thumb and fingers!), one side of goggles smashed, loss of water from broken filler cap and breakdown of automatic air pump (Chorlton had to hand-pump all the way).
14. 1948. 7 August. 'Zandvoort Grand Prix' (Holland). Chorlton's first foreign race.
15. 1948 Saturday 18 September. 'Junior Car Club (incorporating the Brooklands Automobile Racing Club) First Members Race Meeting'. Goodwood.
16. 1948 August. Chorlton entered the 'RAC Grand Prix'. His application was rejected for the ageing Bugatti on the grounds of "suitability", his £20 registration fee was duly returned.
17. 1949. Thursday 28 April. 'Jersey International Road Race'. Chorlton's car was not complete when the boat sailed for Jersey. Instead he hired a plane and flew the car, still without paint and cowling. A driver was killed during practice and the circuit was closed. Chorlton had only completed two laps, two short of the qualifying number, so he could not race the next day.
18. 1949. Thursday 26 May. '11th International British Empire Trophy Race' Douglas Isle of Man.
19. 1950. Monday 10 April. British Automobile Racing Club, Goodwood. 'International Car Race Meeting'.
20. 1950 . 26 August 'Daily Express International Trophy'. Silverstone

== Selected filmography ==
- Music Hall (1934)
- Say It with Flowers (1934)
- The Man Who Changed His Name (1934)
- The Ace of Spades (1935)
- Inside the Room (1935)
- The Rocks of Valpre (1935)
- Street Song (1935)
- In the Soup (1936)
- Eliza Comes to Stay (1936)
- Beauty and the Barge (1937)
- The Bedroom Diplomat (1938)
- Love on the Dole (1941)
- He Found a Star (1941)
- Salute the Soldier (1944)
- Late at Night (1945)
- The Wicked Lady (1945)
