= Michael de Burgh =

British tank commander in World War II (1923–2023)

Michael Graham de Burgh (11 June 1923 – 21 July 2023) was a British tank commander who served during the Allied advance through Italy in the Second World War.

== Biography ==
Born in Norwich to a prominent Anglo-Irish family, de Burgh was the son of Colonel HG de Burgh, an artillery officer who distinguished himself during the First World War. Educated at Beaumont College, Old Windsor, de Burgh was commissioned into the 9th Queen's Royal Lancers (9L) in July 1943. He participated in combat actions, including the attack on the Gothic Line at San Savino in September 1944, and throughout the winter when his regiment operated as infantry.

In April 1945, during the Allied offensive through the Argenta Gap toward the River Po, de Burgh commanded a tank troop. He led his unit across open ground under heavy enemy fire, a mission determined by drawing straws with fellow officer Michael Moule, who provided covering fire. It was later commemorated annually between them by exchanging two straws.

On 24 April 1945, de Burgh was severely wounded when his tank was hit by German artillery near the River Po. He recovered in a field hospital and survived the war.

After the war, de Burgh worked for Arbuthnot Latham, a merchant bank, then moved to Tanganyika (now Tanzania) in 1950 to farm sisal. Returning to Britain, he worked for Guinness for twenty years until retiring in 1985. In retirement, he managed a trout farm in Sussex and engaged in charitable activities, particularly aiding the sick and disabled, eventually becoming a Hospitaller de Notre Dame de Lourdes.

In June 2023, de Burgh was awarded the honorary Buchan Medal by Queen Camilla. He married Penelope Fairlie, daughter of Gerard Fairlie in 1950, and they had four children.
