= Robert Cochran (actor) =

British actor (1906–1977)

Robert Turnbull Cochran (20 February 1906 – 1977) was a British actor. He was born in Glasgow, and died in Kensington. He was ordinarily credited as Robert Cochran but is listed as Robert Cochrane in at least one of his films.

== Filmography ==
His credited film appearances include A Glimpse of Paradise (1934), The Third Clue (1934), Sanders of the River (1935), No Escape (1936), and Mystery of Room 13 (1938). The most notable of his film appearances is as Ebenezer Scrooge's nephew, Fred, in Scrooge (1935), the first feature-length film adaptation with sound of Charles Dickens's A Christmas Carol.
