= Leo Britt =

English actor (1908–1979)

- Born: Leo Ernest Britt; 27 March 1908; Paddington, London, England
- Died: 1979 (aged 71); London, England

Leo Ernest Britt (27 March 1908 – 1979) was a British-American actor. He made about 40 film and television appearances between 1933 and 1975, both in England and the United States. He is perhaps best-remembered as the storyteller at a party in Alfred Hitchcock's Dial M for Murder (1955). One of his last film roles was General James Scarlett in the historical drama The Charge of the Light Brigade (1968).

He became a U.S. citizen in 1955, but returned to England, where he died aged 71.

== Filmography ==
- The Monkey's Paw (1933) as Lance Corporal (uncredited)
- The Roof (1933) as Tony Freyne
- They Came by Night (1940) as George
- Take My Life (1947) as John Newcombe
- The Magnetic Monster (1953) as Dr. Benton
- No Escape (1953) as Minor Role (uncredited)
- Elephant Walk (1954) as Planter Chisholm
- Dial M for Murder (1954) as The Storyteller
- The Black Shield of Falworth (1954) as Sir Robert
- Moonfleet (1955) as Ephraim (uncredited)
- The Court Jester (1955) as Sir Bertram (uncredited)
- The Dirty Dozen (1967) as German General in Staff Car (uncredited)
- The Charge of the Light Brigade (1968) as Gen. Scarlett
- Moon Zero Two (1969) as Senior Customs Officer
- Goodbye, Mr. Chips (1969) as Elder Master (uncredited)
