= Scrooge (1935 film) =

1935 British fantasy film directed by Henry Edwards

- Film Title Frame
- Directed by: Henry Edwards
- Screenplay by: H. Fowler Mear
- Based on: A Christmas Carol; 1843 novella by Charles Dickens
- Produced by: Julius Hagen
- Starring: Sir Seymour Hicks; Donald Calthrop; Robert Cochran; Mary Glynne; Garry Marsh; Oscar Asche; Marie Ney; C.V. France
- Cinematography: Sydney Blythe; William Luff
- Edited by: Ralph Kemplen
- Music by: W.L. Trytel
- Distributed by: Twickenham Film Studios; Paramount Pictures (United States)
- Release date: 26 November 1935
- Running time: 78 minutes
- Country: United Kingdom
- Language: English

Scrooge is a 1935 British Christmas fantasy film directed by Henry Edwards and starring Seymour Hicks, Donald Calthrop and Robert Cochran. The film was released by Twickenham Film Studios and has since entered the public domain. It was the first sound film of feature length to adapt the Charles Dickens novella A Christmas Carol, and it was the second cinematic adaptation of the story to use sound, following a now-lost 1928 short subject adaptation of the story. Hicks stars as Ebenezer Scrooge, a miser who hates Christmas and is visited by a succession of ghosts on Christmas Eve. Hicks had previously played the role of Scrooge on the stage regularly, starting in 1901, and in a 1913 British silent film version. The 1913 film, retitled Old Scrooge, was reissued in 1929 as a "sound film" by the low-budget Weiss Bros. studio, with a synchronized musical score added.

Critical reception to Scrooge has been generally positive over the years. Praise has focused on the film's atmosphere, which has been compared to works of German expressionism, and on the performance of Hicks in the title role. Some reviews have criticized the film for its technical limitations and for heavily abbreviating Scrooge's backstory.

Full film

== Plot ==
It is Christmas Eve of 1843: Ebenezer Scrooge, an elderly and cold-hearted money-lender, is working in his freezing counting house along with his suffering, underpaid clerk Bob Cratchit. Two businessmen arrive to request a donation for the poor, but Scrooge responds that prisons and workhouses are sufficient resources to deal with poor people. Scrooge catches Bob trying to take some coal but warns him he will be out of a job if he does not go back to work. A visit from Fred, Scrooge's nephew and sole living relative, only incites further annoyance, with Scrooge refusing to dine with him and his wife, and grumbling that Christmas is "Humbug!".

That night after work, Bob goes home to celebrate the holidays with his family while Scrooge dines alone at a seedy tavern while the gentlemen and ladies of London celebrate Christmas with the Lord Mayor of London. At home, Scrooge encounters the ghost of his seven-years-dead partner Jacob Marley, who wears a chain he "forged in life" from his own wicked career. He tells Scrooge he will be haunted by three spirits in order to have the chance to escape his fate.

That night, as Marley warned, Scrooge is haunted by the Ghost of Christmas Past, who shows Scrooge how he lost his fiancée Belle due to his avarice and his harsh behavior toward others, including a debt-ridden couple. Scrooge then sees that Belle is now married and has many children.

The next spirit, the Ghost of Christmas Present, shows Scrooge how poor Bob and his family are, as they have a meagre Christmas dinner of goose and pudding. The spirit warns that unless the future changes, Tiny Tim, the youngest son, who is ill, will die. Scrooge then sees how others keep Christmas before seeing Fred celebrate with his wife and friends.

The Ghost of Christmas Yet to Come shows Scrooge what lies in store the following year. Scrooge discovers Tiny Tim is dead, and sees the grave of a man who was robbed after his death and discussed by some businessmen, and discovers it was himself.

Scrooge returns a changed and generous person. He orders a turkey for Bob and his family, gives a large donation to the two men from the day before and dines with Fred. Scrooge raises Bob's wages and gives him the day off, telling him that he will be a godfather to Tiny Tim, who does not die, and the two attend church together. The congregation sings "Hark! The Herald Angels Sing" as they enter.

== Cast ==
- Sir Seymour Hicks as Ebenezer Scrooge
- Donald Calthrop as Robert "Bob" Cratchit
- Robert Cochran as Fred
- Mary Glynne as Belle
- Garry Marsh as Belle's husband
- Philip Frost as Tiny Tim
- Oscar Asche as Spirit of Christmas Present
- Marie Ney as Spirit of Christmas Past (voice, physical outline only)
- C. V. France as Spirit of Christmas Future
- Athene Seyler as Scrooge's charwoman
- Maurice Evans as poor man pleading with Scrooge
- Mary Lawson as poor man's wife
- Barbara Everest as Mrs. Cratchit
- Eve Gray as Fred's wife
- Morris Harvey as poulterer with prize turkey
- D.J. Williams as undertaker
- Margaret Yarde as Scrooge's laundress
- Hugh E. Wright as Old Joe
- Charles Carson as Middlemark, seeking charitable contributions
- Hubert Harben as Worthington, seeking charitable contributions
- Robert Morley as rich man (uncredited)

== Production ==
Scrooge was the first film to be released by Twickenham Film Distributors, Ltd., which was founded by Julius Hagen and Arthur Clavering. Hagen acted as producer for the new company while Clavering handled distribution. Hagen then formed his own distributing firm.

The title character in Scrooge was performed by Sir Seymour Hicks, who had previously portrayed the character on the stage hundreds of times since 1901.

Filming began on 25 March 1935 and the finished picture was ready for advance tradeshow screenings on 2 July. The final budget was £25,000 (then $120,000 US, about par for a moderately budgeted feature film). Producer Hagen arranged distribution throughout the world, with the exception of the United States. Hagen reserved the American rights until he found an offer to his liking, and agreed to Paramount Pictures' plan to release the film "simultaneously with Christmas release [in England]." Hagen's laboratory, owned by George Humphries, worked day and night to manufacture 70 prints of the film for England, after which Hagen sent the original negative to Paramount, which made more than 200 prints for American distribution.

== Reception ==
President Franklin D. Roosevelt showed the film at the White House on Christmas night, 1935.

Variety remarked on the authenticity of the film: "Seymour Hicks has played Ebenezer Scrooge off and on for a quarter of a century. He can do it standing on his head, and was undoubtedly invaluable with his assistance in directing and production details. Whoever selected the supporting cast possesses an uncanny knack for picking types to fit the story which, of course, is laid in England around 1840. They wear the clothes of the period as though accustomed to doing so. Photography is unique in that much of it is shadowy, and suggests a lot more than it reveals."

Kate Cameron of the New York Daily News picked up on the deliberately atmospheric photography: "The settings, when they are sufficiently lighted to see, seem to belong to the period of the tale."

Frank Nugent of The New York Times called Scrooge "a faithful, tender and mellow edition" of A Christmas Carol. "The danger of adapting so widely read an author as Dickens to the screen always has been that the mortals chosen to fill the roles will prove so much less human than the characters he created out of pen, paper and genius. Happily, there is no such disappointment here. Sir Seymour's portrayal of Scrooge is, of course, the highlight of the photoplay [and] Mr. Calthrop's Bob Cratchit could not be bettered."

"Beautifully acted and faithful to the letter and spirit of the story, it is a film that merits the highest praise," wrote William Boehnel of the New York World Telegram. "The pace is just right -- neither too slow nor too fast -- the costumes and the characters are as Dickens painted them, [and] the entire production has a warming glow about it. [Hicks offers,] in short, a performance that brings Scrooge to life on the screen exactly as Dickens imagined him."

== Post-release ==
Variety had actually reviewed the film twice; the second review also praised the film but was most concerned with how it might fare with American audiences: "Scrooge, the English version of 'Christmas Carol', unqualifiedly has captured the spirit of the Dickens classic. It has been acted with fidelity to character, directed with consummate skill and intelligence, and undoubtedly will fill the groove in Christmas week programs. Where it will go on from there is a highly debatable point. [It] certainly deserves a better fate than dual spotting [programmed as part of a double feature]. Properly plugged during the holiday season, it should go over. After that it will be a job of exploitation in getting students and clubwomen interested, as has been done with similar productions of obviously lesser merit and interest."

Paramount timed the American release badly. The studio had announced the American release in November 1935 but made the mistake of making the film available only to first-run cinemas in late December, ensuring a number of engagements in larger cities but killing the film's chances after Christmas week. By the time the first-run houses had finished showing the picture, the Christmas season had passed and the neighbourhood cinemas had no interest in playing it. Paramount might have held back the American release until the following November, when Scrooge could profitably play in extended runs during the Thanksgiving and Christmas holiday seasons.

Producer Julius Hagen, quite bitter about Paramount's handling of his production, remarked, "Chief menace to the British industry at the present time is the Henry VIII myth -- the legend that $300,000 product will be received with open arms in the United States. Not only is the American market cold, but deliberate so [sic]." Hagen had expected a $200,000 return on the American runs of Scrooge; the film earned only $6000 from American cinemas. In a Hollywood Reporter story headlined "Hagen Blames U. S. for His Failure", the uncredited columnist recounted how Scrooge was "planned to be launched as a Christmastime feature but which, through calculated mismanagement across the Atlantic, it was alleged, failed to arrive in time for holiday showing." The economic shortfall resulting from the American handling of Scrooge had a direct effect on Hagen's finances, and his production and distribution companies both went into receivership less than two years after their formation. Hagen did recoup his investment from the international releases of Scrooge; the final figure calculated in 1937, including the paltry American revenue, was $275,000 US.

Scrooge was reissued theatrically in Great Britain by the Ambassador company in 1947.

== Home-movie releases ==
In 1940 Scrooge enjoyed a British release on the popular 9.5mm film gauge.

American entrepreneur Kent D. Eastin, later president of Blackhawk Films, acquired 16mm non-theatrical rights to Scrooge in 1941, and shortened the film to 60 minutes for use in schools, churches, libraries, and other community centers. This hour-long edition is well edited and omits minor episodes without affecting the continuity. For more than 40 years this shorter version of Scrooge was the only way the film could be seen. It was an early arrival on local television stations -- WGN-TV in Chicago broadcast it on Christmas Eve, 1948, and WBZ-TV in Boston aired it on 18 December 1949. It played in Canada on Christmas Eve, 1952.

== New life on home video and television ==
In the early 1980s, with the advent of home video, the prevalence of low-budget TV stations showing inexpensive, public domain movies, and new cable-TV stations offering specialized fare, the Seymour Hicks Scrooge became familiar to a new generation of viewers. The Learning Channel, a cable service, acquired the original 78-minute version of the film from a British source, and broadcast it without fanfare in 1984.

By this time the 1935 Scrooge had been somewhat eclipsed by the 1951 British production starring Alastair Sim, and many latter-day critics viewed the Hicks version in comparison with the Sim version.c

== Contemporary reviews ==
More recent reviewers are split about the merits of the 1935 Scrooge. They commend Seymour Hicks and Donald Calthrop, and note the distinctive directorial and photographic treatments, but they often dismiss it in favour of the 1951 Scrooge.

A 1982 television listing published by The New York Times described the film as "a forgotten and apparently excellent British version of Dickens's Christmas Carol." In 1985, Bob Thomas of Associated Press called the film an "undistinguished Scrooge attempt" that had been overshadowed by the 1951 adaptation. A 1987 television listing written by Bruce Bailey for The Gazette compared the film unfavourably to the 1951 adaptation, writing, "If you aren't too particular about your entertainment, notice that you can also catch the 1935 version of Scrooge". That same year, a television listing written by Bill Kelley for the Sun Sentinel called Scrooge "fairly atmospheric and generally acceptable", comparing it favourably to the 1938 adaptation, which Kelley considered saccharine. In 1988, The New York Times called Scrooge "very good" though described the 1951 adaptation as superior.

That same year, Jeff Seiken of The Philadelphia Inquirer called the film "a holiday treat" and praised Hicks as "especially good at dramatizing [the character's] metamorphosis". but criticized the screenplay's "poor judgement in its selection of scenes": "The movie wastes footage on the Lord Mayor's holiday feast, which warrants only the briefest of mentions in the book, while leaving out the bulk of the episodes from Scrooge's youth and early adulthood." (The sequence of the Lord Mayor's banquet was actually the dramatic equivalent of a musical "production number": an opportunity by the producer and director to impress the audiences with some lavish settings, ambitious staging, and crowds of extras.) Seiken felt that the film's failure to more fully explore Scrooge's early life "robs the story of some of its vitality".

When assessing various adaptations of A Christmas Carol, Christopher Cornell of The Gazette wrote in 1991 that "Vintage-film buffs may sing the praises of Seymour Hicks in 1935's Scrooge". In 1992, Jim Sulski of the Chicago Tribune described Scrooge as "probably the least known" feature film adaptation of A Christmas Carol and wrote, "That's unfortunate, because it's very loyal to Dickens' story, and it's nicely done." Sulski described the film as a "stately, moody version" of the story and appreciated Hicks in the title role. In 1993, Stanley Kauffmann of The New Republic wrote that the best cinematic portrayal of Scrooge was by "the forgotten Sir Seymour Hicks in 1935." That same year, Marc Horton of the Edmonton Journal called Scrooge the second best film adaptation of A Christmas Carol, after the 1951 adaptation. Noting that Scrooge "might disappoint those who prefer a faster pace and a more sophisticated look", he nonetheless felt that the film contains "some delightful moments".

In 2008, Jay Ashley of the Times-News named Hicks as among his favourite screen portrayals of the character. He felt that Hicks and George C. Scott gave the two "most realistic" portrayals of the character on screen, writing, "Hicks is crotchety, eternally angry, pays no attention to personal hygiene, never combs his hair and doesn't leave a tip for his waiter. He is especially gruff with small children, apt to chase them with a stick. His is the most heartfelt "Bah! Humbug!" He is very good at counting his money", though he also opined that Hicks's rendition of the character was "the fastest reclaimed Scrooge". In 2009, Susan King of the Los Angeles Times described Scrooge as "definitely worth checking out because Hicks was the seminal Scrooge in the early part of the 20th century in England." In 2013, Dave Nordstrand of The Salinas Californian wrote, "Every year...I search the channels for the 1935 version of Scrooge", stating that none of the subsequent film adaptations of A Christmas Carol could "quite match the dramatic power of that flickering original."

In 2019, Robert Keeling of Den of Geek dismissed Scrooge as little more than "a curiosity piece", calling the film "a dull and drab affair". Criticizing the film's decision to leave the ghosts mostly unseen, he questioned the theory that this was due to budgetary limitations, writing, "earlier silent films had managed to include ghosts to a pretty decent standard". He considered the film's omissions of Fan and Fezziwig to be another artistic error. and felt that the film "lacks either the darkness or joviality found in Dickens' tale."

That same year, Robert Lloyd of the Los Angeles Times called Scrooge "visually inventive and dramatically astute."

== Availability and versions ==
The hour-long version prepared by Kent Eastin in 1941 became a mainstay on the home-video market, resulting in competing VHS versions in variable quality and condition. The shorter version remains available today on DVD, including a colourized version issued by Legend Films in 2007. Legend published it on Blu-ray in 2011.

David Shepard of Blackhawk Films owned the rights to the 35mm source material (via his company's purchase of the Teleprompter film library), and prepared a restored version of the original 78-minute film, rarely seen since its original 1935 theatrical runs. It was released on DVD by Image Entertainment on 29 October 2002, and remains the only licensed version of Scrooge from 35mm, in its original eight-reel length.

In 2007, VCI Entertainment released the short version on DVD alongside a restoration of the 1951 film adaptation.

Sequences from Scrooge are edited into the 2018 operatic film The Passion of Scrooge.

== See also ==
- Adaptations of A Christmas Carol
- List of Christmas films
- List of ghost films
