= This Week of Grace =

1933 film

- Directed by: Maurice Elvey
- Written by: H. Fowler Mear; Jack Marks
- Story by: Nell Emerald; Maurice Braddell
- Produced by: Julius Hagen
- Starring: Gracie Fields; Henry Kendall; John Stuart
- Cinematography: Sydney Blythe
- Edited by: Jack Harris
- Music by: Percival Mackey
- Production company: Twickenham Studios
- Distributed by: Radio Pictures (UK)
- Release date: July 1933
- Running time: 92 minutes
- Country: United Kingdom
- Language: English

This Week of Grace is a 1933 British comedy film directed by Maurice Elvey and starring Gracie Fields, Henry Kendall and John Stuart. It was written by H. Fowler Mear and Jack Marks from a story by Nell Emerald and Maurice Braddell. The screenplay concerns a poor, unemployed woman who is made housekeeper at the estate of a wealthy duchess. It was promoted with the tagline "Cinderella in modern dress" and includes songs written by Harry Parr-Davies, such as "My Lucky Day" and "Happy Ending".

== Plot ==
Grace Milroy loses her job working at a factory. However, through a strange set of circumstances, she is taken on as housekeeper at the nearby Swinford Castle, the home of the eccentric Duchess of Swinford. She is initially coldly received by the other staff, but she soon wins them over with her personality and hard work. While working there, she falls in love with the Duchess's nephew, Viscount Swinford, and eventually marries him. Later, when she wrongly believes him to have married her under the mistaken impression that she is rich, she leaves him and takes a job on the stage, working in the chorus line. Eventually, the misunderstanding is cleared up, and the couple reconciles.

== Cast ==
- Gracie Fields as Grace Milroy
- Henry Kendall as Lord Clive Swinford
- John Stuart as Henry Baring
- Frank Pettingell as Mr Milroy
- Minnie Rayner as Mrs Milroy
- Douglas Wakefield as Joe Milroy
- Vivian Foster as vicar
- Marjorie Brooks as Pearl Forrester
- Helen Haye as Lady Warmington
- Nina Boucicault as Duchess of Swinford
- Sherman Fisher Girls as dancers

== Production ==
The film was made by Twickenham Studios following a dispute between Radio Pictures, which owned the rights to Fields, and Associated Talking Pictures (ATP), which had previously made her films. It was part of an attempt by Twickenham to move away from making Quota quickies towards higher-budgeted quality productions a strategy that continued until the bankruptcy of its owner, Julius Hagen. As the sound stage at Twickenham was already booked, the film was shot at Ealing Studios.

== Reception ==
The film is one of the least well-known of Fields' works. It has been noted for its promotion of a national consensus between classes — the first time this had been featured in a Fields film. It was theme which was to become a cornerstone of her work during her years of mainstream popularity.

Kine Weekly wrote: "Gracie Fields, who has never looked more attractive, nor worked with greater effect, draws liberally from her repertoire, and contributes a versatile performance which is in itself a great entertainment. She is, however, backed up by a sound team of experienced players, and has in Maurice Elvey a director who knows his job backwards, and it is the first-class combination of talent, experience and ambitious staging that makes the film a star and general attraction of the first box-office magnitude."

The Daily Film Renter wrote: "Gracie's greatest yet – a certain box-office winner that should sweep through the country like wildfire. Story of the perennially popular Cinderella type gives star a million chances to exploit her dazzling personality to the full, while her five song numbers are melodious and delightful. Competent direction, lavish settings, and excellent supporting cast are additional highlights. Film which will clean up wherever it is shown. This film makes ideal material for Gracie, who is seldom absent from the screen throughout its length."

Picturegoer wrote: "Gracie Fields is in a class by herself, and she acquits herself here in a way which will enthuse her numerous admirers. They will probably think I ought to have three-starred this picture, but, looking dispassionately at the story and material at the star's disposal, I do not see how I could. It is just another variation of the old Cinderella theme ... Most of the detail work is extraneous and introduced to give Gracie Fields' versatility a chance of exploitation and also to introduce her music-hall achievements. The film is hers right through. The role of her mother and father are well played by Frank Pettingell and Minnie Rayner, but they have been badly over-drawn and lack the human touch. Douglas Wakefield, too, as Gracie's brother, is caricatured too much to be effective. ... Direction is capable and settings good; but, please, let 'Oor Gracie' have a better story next time – she deserves it."

Picture Show wrote: "I have very great admiration for Gracie Fields, who, in her own line, is one of the greatest artistes of our time, Therefore it is with regret that I write that the story of this film does not do her justice. There is too much family and slapstick humour. ... Gracie Fields has been photographed in this picture much better than in her previous one, Looking On The Bright Side, but she is not so good as she was in her first film, Sally In Our Alley. It is only right to say that the film got a tremendous reception at the first showing.

== Preservation status ==
Thought to have been lost, it was loaned to the British Film Institute as a result of its 2010 search for missing films, and a copy was made for the National Archive.

== Bibliography ==
- Richards, Jeffrey. The Age of the Dream Palace. Routledge & Kegan, 1984.
- Richards, Jeffrey (ed.). The Unknown 1930s: An Alternative History of the British Cinema, 1929- 1939. I.B. Tauris & Co, 1998.
- Shafer, Stephen C. British popular films, 1929-1939: The Cinema of Reassurance. Routledge, 1997.
