= The Five Pound Man =

1937 film

- Directed by: Albert Parker
- Written by: David Evans
- Produced by: Albert Parker
- Starring: Judy Gunn; Edwin Styles; Charles Bannister
- Cinematography: Stanley Grant
- Production company: 20th Century Fox
- Distributed by: 20th Century Fox
- Release date: 24 March 1937
- Running time: 76 minutes
- Country: United Kingdom
- Language: English

The Five Pound Man (also known as £5 Man, Five Pound Man, The 5 Pound Man) is a 1937 British comedy crime film directed by Albert Parker and starring Judy Gunn, Edwin Styles and Charles Bannister. It was written by David Evans and made at Wembley Studios as a quota quickie by the British subsidiary of 20th Century Fox.

== Plot ==
Richard Fordyce, released from prison after serving a sentence for a counterfeiting – a crime he didn’t commit – is anxious to find out who framed him. Traveling penniless across the country, he holds an auction for his services and is "purchased" for £5 by Margaret Fenton. Margaret’s husband, Claude, turns out to be the man who framed him. When the police arrive, Claude kills himself to avoid capture. Richard and Margaret, who have fallen in love, are free to marry.

== Cast ==
- Judy Gunn as Margaret Fenton
- Edwin Styles as Richard Fordyce
- Frank Allenby as Claud Fenton
- Charles Bannister as Eustace Grant
- Esma Cannon as Lucy
- G. H. Mulcaster as Sinclair

== Reception ==
The Monthly Film Bulletin wrote: "The story is told very slowly and with many repetitions, and the climax fizzles out. Edwin Styles makes the most of Richard Fordyce but Judy Gunn is a colourless Margaret."

The Daily Film Renter wrote: "The plot is of an essentially conventional character, but it is saved from melodrama by a pleasant element of light comedy in dialogue and characterisation, while such familiar crook film appurtenances as sliding panels and underground cellars are quite skilfully introduced. Edwin Styles brings a neat sense of comedy to bear on the part of Fordyce, Judy Gunn makes a charming Margaret. Frank Allenby heads, with the necessary conspiratorial air, an ugly band of crooks, and Esma Cannon as a housemaid giggles with delight at the under-butler's sallies."

Picturegoer wrote: "Heavy and inherently artificial plot, dealing with a man wrongly accused of counterfeiting, who sets out to discover the man who framed him. The mixture of crime and comedy is not happily blended and the dialogue is unremarkable. Edwin Styles tends to be far too facetious as the hero, but Judy Gunn is attractive as the heroine."

Picture Show wrote: "This amusing little film is dominated by the easy, whimsical humour of Edwin Styles. There are some genuine thrills and plenty of bright comedy."
