= Dorothy Boyd =

English actress (1907–1996)

- Born: 14 April 1907; Sanderstead, Surrey, England
- Died: 1996 (aged 88–89); England
- Occupation: Actress
- Years active: 1926-1940

Dorothy Boyd (14 April 1907 – 1996) was an English film actress. She appeared in more than 30 films between 1926 and 1940. She was born in Sanderstead, Surrey, England and died in England. Without any previous stage experience, she came to films when she appeared in three short films made in the Phonofilm sound-on-film process, Knee Deep in Daisies (1926), The Sentence of Death (1927), and The Burglar and the Girl (1928). A director was impressed by her and brought her to the notice of Alfred Hitchcock who cast her in his feature Easy Virtue (1928).

== Selected filmography ==
- The Ball of Fortune (1926)
- Somehow Good (1927)
- The Constant Nymph (1928)
- Love's Option (1928)
- Easy Virtue (1928)
- Auld Lang Syne (1929)
- Birds of Prey (1930)
- Love Lies (1931)
- The Sport of Kings (1931)
- The Girl in the Night (1931)
- The House of Unrest (1931)
- Third Time Lucky (1931)
- Rynox (1932)
- The Iron Stair (1933)
- Called Back (1933)
- Two Wives for Henry (1933)
- A Shot in the Dark (1933)
- Virginia's Husband (1934)
- Oh No Doctor! (1934)
- Lily of Killarney (1934)
- It Happened in Paris (1935)
- Inside the Room (1935)
- The Ace of Spades (1935)
- Ticket of Leave (1936)
- Everything in Life (1936)
- A Touch of the Moon (1936)
- Pearls Bring Tears (1937)
- Shadowed Eyes (1940)
