= The Love Test =

- Judy Gunn and Louis Hayward
- Directed by: Michael Powell
- Written by: Jack Celestin (story); Selwyn Jepson (script)
- Produced by: Leslie Landau
- Starring: Judy Gunn; Louis Hayward; David Hutcheson; Googie Withers; Bernard Miles
- Cinematography: Arthur Crabtree
- Music by: Charles Cowlrick
- Distributed by: Fox Film Company
- Release date: 1 July 1935
- Running time: 63 min
- Country: United Kingdom
- Language: English

The Love Test is a 1935 British romantic comedy film directed by Michael Powell and starring Judy Gunn, Louis Hayward, David Hutcheson and Googie Withers. It was written by Selwyn Jepson from a story by Jack Celestin, and was made as a quota quickie.

== Plot ==
When a woman is made the head of a chemistry laboratory, her colleagues hatch a plot to make her fall in love, and neglect her work duties.

== Cast ==
- Judy Gunn as Mary Lee
- Louis Hayward as John Gregg
- David Hutcheson as Thompson (as Dave Hutcheson)
- Googie Withers as Minnie
- Morris Harvey as Company President
- Aubrey Dexter as Vice-president
- Eve Turner as Kathleen
- Bernard Miles as Allan
- Jack Knight as Managing Director
- Gilbert Davis as Hosiah Smith, Chief Chemist
- Shayle Gardner as night watchman
- James Craig as boiler man
- Thorley Walters as chemist
- Ian Wilson as chemist

== Production ==
The chemistry laboratory is trying to find a way to make the cellulose used to make toy dolls in a non-flammable form. There are obvious resonances to the problem with the highly flammable celluloid used to make films like this one.

Withers made four quota quickies with Powell, who she found a "difficult man".

== Reception ==
The Daily Film Renter wrote: "This first full-length feature from the Fox British Studios at Wembley is a smartly turned out piece of work, particularly on the technical side. ...There is, perhaps, rather a lot of dialogue, but, taken all round, the picture is quite a pleasant effort, especially on the romantic side."

Picture Show wrote: "The story is a bit thin at times, but Judy Gunn and Louis Hayward make a pleasant hero and heroine; while some amusement is caused by Googie Withers as the vamp."

Reviewing the film's showing at the British Film Institute's 1990 London Film Festival, Variety wrote: "The Love Test is a solid British programmer from the 1930s that would hardly rate a mention if the director's name wasn't Michael Powell. ... Apart from a long opening tracking shot through the lab, there's little here for Powell buffs to get excited about. But it's ably put together, lensed in glistening style by future director Arthur Crabtree, and vigorously played by an ensemble cast."

== Bibliography ==
- Powell, Michael. A Life in Movies: An Autobiography. London: Heinemann, 1986. ISBN 0-434-59945-X.
