= Two Wives for Henry =

1933 film by Adrian Brunel

- Directed by: Adrian Brunel
- Written by: Anthony Kimmins
- Produced by: George Smith
- Starring: Garry Marsh; Dorothy Boyd; Jack Raine; Andreas Malandrinos
- Production company: George Smith Productions
- Distributed by: Fox
- Release date: 1933
- Running time: 45 minutes
- Country: United Kingdom
- Language: English

Two Wives for Henry is a 1933 British comedy film directed by Adrian Brunel and starring Garry Marsh, Dorothy Boyd and Jack Raine. It was written by Anthony Kimmins, and was a quota quickie made at Wembley Studios by the independent producer George Smith as part of a contract from Fox.

A man decides to take a "substitute" wife with him for a vacation in Brighton, but things soon begin to go wrong.

== Preservation status ==
The British Film Institute National Archive holds a collection of stills but no film or video materials.

== Cast ==
- Garry Marsh as Henry Stetson
- Dorothy Boyd as Estelle Stetson
- Jack Raine as Hugo Horsfal
- Andreas Malandrinos as Gonzalez
- Paul Sheridan as Alphonse Pujol
- Millicent Wolf as Vera

== Reception ==
Picturegoer wrote: "Weak plot adequately handled and moderately well acted."

Picture Show wrote: "There is no lack of amusing incident In this unpretentious little comedy of a boot manufacturer who takes unto himself a second (platonic) wife for business reasons only, and steps into a whole lot of trouble. Directed and acted with a light, sure touch,"
