= O. B. Clarence =

British actor (1870–1955)

Clarence in 1925

Oliver Burchett Clarence (25 March 1870, Hampstead, London – 2 October 1955, Hove, Sussex) was an English actor.

Following his education at Dover College and University College Hospital, he made his stage debut in 1890. His experience included Shakespearean and other repertory with Frank Benson and Ben Greet. He performed in more than eighty productions in London, originating roles in plays by W. S. Gilbert, Bernard Shaw and others. He toured the provinces, appeared several times on Broadway, and made many films between 1914 and 1948.

== Life and career ==
=== Early years ===
Clarence was born on 25 March 1870 in Hampstead, London, to Lovell Burchett Clarence, a colonial Supreme Court judge, and his wife Blanche, (née Gunter; 1840–1886). He was intended for a medical career, and after his schooling at Dover College he studied at University College Hospital, London, before abandoning medicine for the stage. He made his first appearance on the stage at the old Trocadero Music Hall on 14 July 1890, with Arthur Lloyd and first appeared on what he called "the regular stage" at the Olympic Theatre, in December 1890, in The People's Idol. For four years, he was a member of F. R. Benson's company, playing numerous parts. He then toured with Miss Fortescue, Muriel Wylford. and in Africa with Leonard Rayne, before returning to Britain and touring with Ben Greet as the Rev Gavin Dishart in The Little Minister. He rejoined Benson, appearing at the Lyceum (1900) and the Comedy (1901).

Clarence, left, as the Rev Aloysius Parfitt in The Fairy's Dilemma (1904) with Arthur Bourchier

In May 1901, he appeared at the Royal Opera House, Covent Garden, as Verges in Charles Villiers Stanford's operatic version of Much Ado About Nothing. The following year he joined Herbert Beerbohm Tree's company at His Majesty's, playing Simple in The Merry Wives of Windsor, Starveling and Quince in A Midsummer Night's Dream and Adam in As You Like It. After engagements on tour and in the West End he joined the Garrick Theatre company, under Arthur Bourchier, in February 1904, and appeared there in roles ranging from the Rev Aloysius Parfitt and Harlequin in The Fairy's Dilemma to Old Gobbo in The Merchant of Venice. With the exception of Clown in The Winter's Tale in 1906 his roles in the 1900s were in modern plays, including The Voysey Inheritance and Our Miss Gibbs.

In late 1908, Clarence went to the US with Maxine Elliott, and played in Deborah of Tod's and The Inferior Sex. After a round of T. W. Robertson in London, he returned to the US in The Inferior Sex, subsequently touring with Olga Nethersole, playing Cayley Drummle in The Second Mrs Tanqueray, and M. Duval in Camille.

=== West End and Broadway ===
Clarence reappeared in London, at the Savoy in June 1911, playing Lord Feenix in Dombey and Son, and subsequently Jingle in Two Peeps at Pickwick. In the same year he married Hilda Bessie Forscutt; they had one daughter. In 1912, his parts included a rare title role: Kipps in a dramatisation of H. G. Wells's novel. Between then and 1919 he appeared in London and the provinces in mostly modern plays, and in January 1920 he returned to the US, playing in three plays in Broadway for the rest of that year and into 1921.

As the Inquisitor in Saint Joan, 1924

At the Everyman in May 1922 he played William in Bernard Shaw's You Never Can Tell, subsequently playing the same part in Zurich and Geneva, and in 1924 he played one of the roles most closely identified with him: the Inquisitor in Shaw's Saint Joan. The Times said of his performance:

Nobody who saw that almost motionless, white robed figure sitting calmly on the dais, delivering a quietly judicial speech, which held the audience dead still, could ever forget that there was the illusion of the drama at its best and most intense.

The following year he played Firs in Nigel Playfair's production of The Cherry Orchard at the Lyric Theatre, Hammersmith. For the rest of the 1920s he appeared mostly in new West End plays ("most of which are now forgotten" according to The Times) though he played Lord Sands and Cranmer in Henry VIII in Lewis Casson's 1925 production, starring Sybil Thorndike, and Lord Ogleby in The Clandestine Marriage in 1928.

The rest of Clarence's long career followed a similar pattern: playing old men in ephemeral new plays in the West End and on Broadway, with occasional appearances in the classics, both old and new. These included a second run as the Inquisitor in Saint Joan (1931), Mazzini Dunn in Heartbreak House (1932), George Booth in The Voysey Inheritance (1934) and Sir William Gower in Trelawny of the 'Wells' (1938). In 1939, Clarence played Polonius in Tyrone Guthrie's modern-dress and uncut Hamlet with Alec Guinness in the title role. He played Firs again in 1941 in a production by Guthrie at the New Theatre, and Old Hardcastle in She Stoops to Conquer in 1943 and 1945.

Clarence retired from the stage in 1945 and made the last of his many film appearances in 1948. He died in Hove, Sussex, on 2 October 1955, aged 85.

=== Reputation ===
The Times commented that Clarence had been "for more than half a century one of the most accomplished character actors on the English stage":

He was the old man in a bewildering variety of parts on the stage and on the screen, holding his hand to his ear and quavering: "Eh? Eh?" Yet each part, however small it was, was carefully and subtly thought out in detail; nothing was ever mechanical or stereotyped, and so perfect was the characterization that there indeed moved and had their being, Fondlewife, Booth Voysey. General Gough-Bogle, and Old Hardcastle and not Mr. O. B. Clarence giving his well-known interpretation of the parts. Few actors have been so utterly absorbed by their art, fewer still have made such a reputation by such self-effacement.

=== Films ===
Although best known as a stage actor, Clarence made many films between 1914 and 1948. They include:

- Liberty Hall (1914) – Todman Crafer
- London Pride (1920) – Mr. Tunks
- The Little Hour of Peter Wells (1920) – Peter Wells
- The Man from Chicago (1930) – John Larwood
- The Bells (1931) – Watchman
- Keepers of Youth (1931) – Slade
- Goodnight, Vienna (1932) – Theatre Manager
- Jack's the Boy (1932) – Timkins (uncredited)
- The Flag Lieutenant (1932) – Gen. Gough-Bogle
- Where Is This Lady? (1932) – Dr. Peffer
- The Barton Mystery (1932) – Sir Everard Marshall
- Discord (1933) – Mr. Hemming
- Perfect Understanding (1933) – Dr. Graham
- Soldiers of the King (1933) – Tom
- Excess Baggage (1933) – Lord Grebe
- Falling for You (1933) – Trubshawe
- His Grace Gives Notice (1933) – Lord Rannock
- A Shot in the Dark (1933) – Rev. John Makehan
- I Adore You (1933) – Mr. Young
- Friday the Thirteenth (1933) – Clerk
- Turkey Time (1933) – Shopkeeper (uncredited)
- The Silver Spoon (1933) – Parker
- Eyes of Fate (1933) – Mr. Oliver
- The Double Event (1934) – Rev. Martingale
- The Only Girl (1933) – Etienne
- The Great Defender (1934) – Mr. Hammond
- Song at Eventide (1934) – Registrar
- Nell Gwynn (1934) – Clockmaker (uncredited)
- Father and Son (1934) – Tom Yates
- Lady in Danger (1934) – Nelson
- The Scarlet Pimpernel (1934) – Count de Tournay
- The King of Paris (1934) – Mayor
- The Feathered Serpent (1934) – George Beale
- D'Ye Ken John Peel? (1935) – Ogleby
- Barnacle Bill (1935) – Uncle George
- Dandy Dick (1935) – Council Member (uncredited)
- Squibs (1935) – Sir John Barratt
- The Private Secretary (1935) – Thomas Marsland
- No Monkey Business (1935) – Professor
- Captain Bill (1935) – Sir Anthony Kipps
- The Cardinal (1936) – Monterosa
- Seven Sinners (1936) – Registrar
- East Meets West (1936) – Osmin
- All In (1936) – Hemingway
- The Mill on the Floss (1936) – Mr. Gore
- King of Hearts (1936) – Mr. Ponsonby
- Silver Blaze (1937) – Estate Agent (uncredited)
- Victoria the Great (1937) – Coachman-in-Chief
- Murder at the Baskervilles (1937) – De Marre
- Dinner at the Ritz (1937) – Messenger (uncredited)
- Second Best Bed (1938) – Torceston Magistrate (uncredited)
- Pygmalion (1938) – Mr. Birchwood – the Vicar
- It's in the Air (1938) – Sir Philip's Gardener (uncredited)
- Old Iron (1938) – Gordon
- A Spot of Bother (1938) – Butler (uncredited)
- Stolen Life (1939) – (uncredited)
- Me and My Pal (1939) – Judge
- Black Eyes (1939) – Waiter
- Jamaica Inn (1939) – Coach Passenger (uncredited)
- The Missing People (1939)
- Young Man's Fancy (1939) – Guest at Reception (uncredited)
- The Dark Eyes of London (1939) – Prof. John Dearborn (voice, uncredited)
- Return to Yesterday (1940) – Mr. Truscott
- Spy for a Day (1940) – Medical Officer
- Saloon Bar (1940) – Sir Archibald
- Major Barbara (1941) – Pettigrew
- Old Mother Riley in Business (1941)
- Quiet Wedding (1941) – First Magistrate
- Inspector Hornleigh Goes To It (1941) – Professor Mackenzie
- Turned Out Nice Again (1941) – Mr. Dawson
- Dangerous Moonlight (1941, released as Suicide Squadron in the USA) – Waiter with Tray of Wine
- Old Mother Riley's Circus (1941) – Lawyer
- Penn of Pennsylvania (1942) – Lord Cecil
- Gert and Daisy's Weekend (1942) – Vicar (uncredited)
- Front Line Kids (1942) – 'Real' Clergyman (uncredited)
- On Approval (1944) – Dr. Graham
- A Place of One's Own (1945) – Perkins
- The Way to the Stars (1945) – Minor Role (scenes deleted)
- Great Day (1945)
- Caesar and Cleopatra (1945) – Egyptian (uncredited)
- The Magic Bow (1946) – Old Gentleman
- School for Secrets (1946) – Old Retainer
- Great Expectations (1946) – The Aged Parent
- While the Sun Shines (1947) – Old Gentleman
- Meet Me at Dawn (1947) – Ambassador
- Uncle Silas (1947) – Vicar Clay
- The Calendar (1948) – Old Gentleman at Epsom
- No Room at the Inn (1948) – Reporter in Council Chambers (uncredited) (final film role)

== Sources ==
- Parker, John; Freda Gaye; Ian Herbert (1978). Who Was Who in the Theatre. Detroit: Gale Research. OCLC 310466458.
