= William Luff =

British actor and cinematographer (1872–1960)

- Born: 31 May 1872; London, United Kingdom
- Died: 15 March 1960 (aged 87); United Kingdom
- Occupations: Actor, cinematographer
- Years active: 1913–1948 (film)

William Luff (1872–1960) was a British actor and cinematographer. He played the role of Charles II in the 1922 silent The Glorious Adventure. Following the arrival of sound he switched to cinematography. He worked for Julius Hagen's Twickenham Studios during the 1930s, shooting several of the company's more expensive films.

== Selected filmography ==
=== Cinematographer ===
- Frail Women (1932)
- Condemned to Death (1932)
- The Lodger (1932)
- Bella Donna (1934)
- The Lash (1934)
- The Broken Melody (1934)
- Lily of Killarney (1934)
- Scrooge (1935)
- Cock o' the North (1935)
- Inside the Room (1935)
- Annie, Leave the Room! (1935)
- She Shall Have Music (1935)
- Eliza Comes to Stay (1936)
- A Romance in Flanders (1937)
- Silver Blaze (1937)
- London Scrapbook (1942)

=== Actor ===
- The Glorious Adventure (1922)
- A Gipsy Cavalier (1922)
- The Virgin Queen (1923)

== Bibliography ==
- Klossner, Michael. The Europe of 1500–1815 on Film and Television: A Worldwide Filmography of Over 2550 Works, 1895 Through 2000. McFarland, 2002.
