= James A. Carter =

British art director (born 1902)

- Born: 1902 (age 123–124); London, England
- Other names: James Carter, Jimmy Carter
- Occupations: Art Director, Producer
- Years active: 1923–1948 (film)

James A. Carter (born 1902) was a British art director and occasional film producer.

Carter was born in London in 1902. He studied at the Royal Academy of Art and the Royal Academy of Music, before beginning his career in the film industry at Worton Hall Studies in 1923. He was employed during the 1930s at Julius Hagen's Twickenham Studios where he worked on films such as The Triumph of Sherlock Holmes (1935). He was eventually appointed to the board of the Twickenham company. During World War II, he made training films for all three branches of the armed forces.

== Selected filmography ==
=== Art director ===
- The Mystery of the Villa Rose (1930)
- Chin Chin Chinaman (1931)
- A Night in Montmartre (1931)
- Frail Women (1932)
- Lily of Killarney (1934)
- Whispering Tongues (1934)
- The Man Who Changed His Name (1934)
- Music Hall (1934)
- The Admiral's Secret (1934)
- Bella Donna (1934)
- Flood Tide (1934)
- The Broken Melody (1934)
- The Black Abbot (1934)
- Lord Edgware Dies (1934)
- The Morals of Marcus (1935)
- The Rocks of Valpre (1935)
- D'Ye Ken John Peel? (1935)
- Squibs (1935)
- Inside the Room (1935)
- She Shall Have Music (1935)
- The Triumph of Sherlock Holmes (1935)
- The Last Journey (1936)
- The Vicar of Bray (1937)
- Sons of the Sea (1939)
- Under Your Hat (1940)
- Law and Disorder (1940)
- You Will Remember (1941)
- Hatter's Castle (1942)
- Headline (1944)
- A Girl in a Million (1946)
- Daybreak (1948)

=== Producer ===
- They Made Me a Fugitive (1947)
- Dancing with Crime (1947)
- Just William's Luck (1947)
- Daughter of Darkness (1948)
- Things Happen at Night (1948)

== Bibliography ==
- Low, Rachael. Filmmaking in 1930s Britain. George Allen & Unwin, 1985.
