= Sydney Blythe =

English cinematographer (1886–1947)

Sydney Charles William Blythe (28 December 1886 – 4 March 1947) was an English cinematographer.

In 1939, Blythe became the licensee of the Royal Oak pub in Isleworth.

Blythe married Pauline Ethel Talbot on 30 June 1913 in Wandsworth.

Blythe died on 4 March 1947, aged 60.

== Selected filmography ==
- The Faithful Heart (1922)
- Married Love (1923)
- The Knockout (1923)
- She (1925)
- If Youth But Knew (1926)
- Q Ships (1928)
- The Infamous Lady (1928)
- At the Villa Rose (1930)
- Lord Richard in the Pantry (1930)
- Alibi (1931)
- Black Coffee (1931)
- A Night in Montmartre (1931)
- The Lyons Mail (1931)
- Splinters in the Navy (1931)
- A Tight Corner (1932)
- The Face at the Window (1932)
- Once Bitten (1932)
- I Lived with You (1933)
- Excess Baggage (1933)
- This Week of Grace (1933)
- The Wandering Jew (1933)
- Say It with Flowers (1934)
- Bella Donna (1934)
- Blind Justice (1934)
- Kentucky Minstrels (1934)
- Lily of Killarney (1934)
- Lord Edgware Dies (1934)
- The Man Who Changed His Name (1934)
- The Broken Melody (1934)
- She Shall Have Music (1935)
- The Rocks of Valpre (1935)
- Vintage Wine (1935)
- D'Ye Ken John Peel? (1935)
- The Lad (1935)
- A Fire Has Been Arranged (1935)
- Squibs (1935)
- Scrooge (1935)
- Eliza Comes to Stay (1936)
- In the Soup (1936)
- The Angelus (1937)
- Death Croons the Blues (1937)
- A Romance in Flanders (1937)
- Beauty and the Barge (1937)
- Underneath the Arches (1937)
- A People Eternal (1939)
