= Gerard Fairlie =

Scottish writer (1899–1983)

Francis Gerard Luis Fairlie (1 November 1899 – 31 March 1983) was a Scottish writer and scriptwriter on whom 'Sapper' (H. C. McNeile) supposedly based the character of Bulldog Drummond. Ian Fleming stated that James Bond was influenced partially by the Drummond character. After Sapper's death in 1937, Fairlie continued the Bulldog Drummond book series.

Fairlie was born in Kensington, London. His grandfather was Army officer and golfer James Ogilvie Fairlie. He was educated at Downside School in Somerset and the Royal Military College, Sandhurst and was commissioned in December 1918 in the Scots Guards. He was both an Army boxing champion and a member of the Great Britain team in the bobsleigh at the 1924 Winter Olympics at Chamonix, France; his team finished fifth.

He married Joan Roskell in 1923 and became a journalist and screenwriter. In the Second World War, he served as an army officer with the Royal Sussex Regiment. The French awarded Fairlie with a Croix de Guerre during the Second World War while he was undertaking intelligence work. In addition to the Drummond series Fairlie wrote series books about Victor Caryll, Johnny Macall and Mr Malcolm. He died in East Lavington in West Sussex. His son-in-law was Michael de Burgh.

== Bibliography ==
=== Non-series novels ===
- The Man Who Laughed (1928)
- Scissors Cut Paper (1928)
- The Exquisite Lady (1929) – a.k.a. Yellow Munro
- Stone Blunts Scissors (1929)
- The Reaper (1929)
- The Muster of the Vultures (1930)
- Suspect (1930)
- The Man with Talent (1931)
- Unfair Lady (1931)
- Birds of Prey (1932)
- The Rope Which Hangs (1932)
- The Treasure Nets (1933)
- Copper at Sea (1934)
- That Man Returns (1934)
- The Pianist Shoots First (1938)
- They Found Each Other (1946)

=== The Mr. Malcolm Series ===
- Shot in the Dark (1932)
- Men for Counters (1933)
- Mr. Malcolm Presents (1934)

=== The Bulldog Drummond Series ===
- Bulldog Drummond on Dartmoor (1938)
- Bulldog Drummond Attacks (1939)
- Captain Bulldog Drummond (1945)
- Bulldog Drummond Stands Fast (1947)
- Hands Off Bulldog Drummond! (1949)
- Calling Bulldog Drummond (1951)
- The Return of the Black Gang (1954)

=== The Johnny Macall Series ===
- Winner Take All (1953)
- No Sleep for Macall (1955)
- Deadline for Macall (1956)
- Double The Bluff (1959)
- Macall Gets Curious (1959)
- Please Kill My Cousin (1961)

=== Non fiction ===
- With Prejudice: Almost an Autobiography (1952)
- Flight Without Wings: The Biography of Hannes Schneider (1957)
- The Reluctant Cop: The Story and Cases of Detective Superintendent Albert Webb (late of Scotland Yard) (1958)
- The Fred Emney story (1960)
- The Life of a Genius: Sir George Cayley, Pioneer of Modern Aviation (1965) (with Elizabeth Cayley)

== Selected filmography ==
- The Lad (1935)
- The Ace of Spades (1935)
- The Big Noise (1936)
- Chick (1936)
- Calling Bulldog Drummond (1951)
