= William Trytel =

Dutch-born composer

- Born: 17 November 1894; Amsterdam, North Holland; Netherlands
- Died: 1964 (aged 69–70); Westminster, England; United Kingdom
- Other names: W.L. Trytel; Otto Ferrari; W.L. Rytel; Bill Trytel
- Occupation: Composer
- Years active: 1927–1959 (film)

William Trytel (1894–1964), frequently credited as W. L. Trytel, was a Dutch-born composer. He settled in Britain where he became known for his film scores, notably at Twickenham Studios where he became director of music as well as sitting on the company's board.

== Selected filmography ==
- The Outsider (1931)
- Captivation (1931)
- The Lodger (1932)
- Frail Women (1932)
- In a Monastery Garden (1932)
- Going Gay (1933)
- Whispering Tongues (1934)
- Bella Donna (1934)
- The Night Club Queen (1934)
- The Admiral's Secret (1934)
- Kentucky Minstrels (1934)
- Flood Tide (1934)
- Music Hall (1934)
- Blind Justice (1934)
- The Man Who Changed His Name (1934)
- Lily of Killarney (1934)
- The Broken Melody (1934)
- The Lad (1935)
- D'Ye Ken John Peel? (1935)
- Squibs (1935)
- Scrooge (1935)
- The Triumph of Sherlock Holmes (1935)
- The Morals of Marcus (1935)
- Inside the Room (1935)
- She Shall Have Music (1935)
- The Rocks of Valpre (1935)
- Street Song (1935)
- Spy of Napoleon (1936)
- Eliza Comes to Stay (1936)
- The Last Journey (1936)
- Death Croons the Blues (1937)
- Beauty and the Barge (1937)
- Dead Men Tell No Tales (1938)
- Undercover Girl (1958)
- Meet Maxwell Archer (1940)
- Lady from Lisbon (1942)
- Sabotage at Sea (1942)
- The Temptress (1949)
- Undercover Girl (1958)

== Bibliography ==
- Low, Rachael. Filmmaking in 1930s Britain. George Allen & Unwin, 1985.
