= Julius Hagen =

British film producer (1884–1940)

- Born: Julius Jacob Kleimenhagen; 1884; Hamburg, German Empire
- Died: 1940 (aged 55–56); London, England
- Years active: 1913–1937

Julius Hagen (1884–1940) was a German-born British film producer who produced more than a hundred films in Britain.

Hagen originally worked as a salesman for Ruffels Pictures. He then worked his way up to become a production manager in the British silent film industry before becoming an independent producer in 1927. From 1928, he took control of Twickenham Studios and became one of the most prolific and successful producers of Quota quickies. He later switched to making more prestigious films, but in 1937 he was forced into bankruptcy and lost control of Twickenham.

Hagen also directed a film, the 1928 adaptation of an Agatha Christie novel The Passing of Mr. Quinn.

== Early life ==
Hagen was born in Hamburg but emigrated to Britain when he was still a child. He began his entertainment career as a stage actor, but in 1913 moved into the film industry and worked for several years as a film salesman. By 1917, he was a partner in a film distribution company, but this went bankrupt in 1919.

For the next few years, Hagen returned to selling films around the country and built up a reputation as an effective salesmen, enjoying success with films that were considered difficult to sell. He was then given a job as production manager with Stoll Pictures, one of the leading British Studios, whose main studio was based in Cricklewood. Following the Slump of 1924, the number of films produced rapidly declined and, in 1926, Hagen lost his job. He then moved to the rival company Astra-National where he co-produced The Flag Lieutenant, one of the biggest hits of 1926, starring Henry Edwards.

== Independent producer ==
In 1927, Hagen and Edwards formed a separate production company, and created a sequel The Further Adventures of the Flag Lieutenant, which also proved popular with British audiences. The film was made at Twickenham Studios in Middlesex, and Hagen used it as his primary base of operations thereafter. Hagen followed this with The Fake (1927). He tried to secure financial backing for further films from the City of London, but after a brief boom in the late 1920s it was increasingly difficult to secure backing there for film production.

== Twickenham Studios ==
=== Quota Quickies ===
In 1927, following the Slump of 1924 and the rapid drop in British film production, the British Parliament passed the Cinematograph Films Act which was designed to protect British filmmaking from foreign competition. It imposed a quota for distributors and exhibitors, who had to show a fixed minimum percentage of British films each year. It meant that cinemas now required an urgent increase in the availability of British films and began by producing The Passing of Mr. Quin, an Agatha Christie adaptation, which he directed himself.

Hagen gradually began to gain commissions from British distributors who needed cheap films to help them comply with the quota. He founded the Strand Film Company in 1928 and in December that year secured the lease on Twickenham Studios. Working from Twickenham, Hagen soon established a stock company of actors and technicians to work on his films. He kept an eye to the international market, and imported overseas stars such as Margot Landa to appear in his films. He also arranged for co-productions including the Anglo-French At the Villa Rose. The sudden arrival of sound created an increased demand for double bills and it soon became established that the low-budget films would be screened as a prelude to the more expensive main features produced by major studios. They were commonly labelled "Quota Quickies", and can be considered equivalent to the B movie.

Hagen employed former silent directors such as George Pearson, Henry Edwards and Maurice Elvey. Other directors, such as George A. Cooper and Bernard Vorhaus, made several films at Twickenham. Leslie S. Hiscott was one of the most prolific directors, and also played a part in production and the overall running of the studio.

=== Boom ===
Hagen steadily built his business up during the early years of sound. His major breakthrough as a producer came in 1929 when he secured a contract with one of the Hollywood Majors, Warner Brothers, to provide them with a supply of British 'quota quickies' which they needed in order to meet the requirements of the Cinematograph Films Act 1927 in order to exhibit their American-made films in Britain – their most important foreign market at the time. Despite their relatively low budgets, Hagen's films were disproportionately well received by audiences, and regularly gained many rental bookings. Although generally designed as supporting features, many Twickenham films were instead screened as main attractions. While Hagen's business model depended on the money he received to produce Quota Quickies, he was also more ambitious and oversaw film series dedicated to Sherlock Holmes and Hercule Poirot.

In the wake of the success of his films for Warner Brothers, Hagen began receiving contracts from other Hollywood Studios Fox Film Corporation, MGM, RKO and United Artists and by 1933 Twickenham's output had reached 20 films a year. Hagen introduced a policy of round the clock filming, which meant that separate crews worked in the day and night on different films. In 1930, one of the extras working on Spanish Eyes, a night-time production, died in strange circumstances, which drew attention to the studio's activities. The subsequent Inquest exonerated the studio of any blame. During these years Hagen managed to perfect efficient mass production of films despite the limitations of only having one shooting stage. Hagen eventually tried to remedy the lack of space by rebuilding Twickenham, and by purchasing additional studios in Merton Park and Elstree.

=== Prestige films ===
From 1933, Hagen began making a greater number of quality films including I Lived with You with Ivor Novello, a leading 1920s film star, and The Wandering Jew with the German actor Conrad Veidt and This Week of Grace, a comedy starring the British comedian Gracie Fields. His interest in more expensive films was spurred by the global success of The Private Life of Henry VIII, produced by Alexander Korda. Hagen, along with other British producers, attempted to copy Korda's success with their own interternationally-minded productions.

In April 1935, Hagen made his last quota film Inside the Room for Universal and ended his relationship with the Hollywood Studios. He created his own distribution company in an attempt to gain more control over his product's access to cinemas.

In 1936, Hagen's output fell to eleven films because he had decided to switch to a programme of making quality over quantity. His strategy involved employing British stage and music hall stars, as well as employing leading American or European directors and actors to work on his films. In 1935, Hagen brought over D.W. Griffith to London to remake Broken Blossoms, although Griffith's alcoholism eventually led to him being replaced as director by John Brahm. Actors including Lupe Vélez, Edward Everett Horton, Cedric Hardwicke and Boris Karloff appeared in Twickenham films during the Hagen era.

=== Collapse ===
On 8 January 1937, Hagen's Twickenham companies went into receivership. The announcement generally caught the film world and financial markets by surprise as Hagen's empire had appeared to be doing well. Hagen attempted to persuade his creditors to allow him to go into Voluntary liquidation, but a group led by the Westminster Bank refused to accept the proposal. This ended Hagen's plan of setting up a new company at Twickenham to continue making films.

The collapse of Twickenham Studios are generally blamed on the failure of Hagen to secure adequate distribution for his films. Hagen's new business plan relied on his films getting wide circulation in the lucrative American market. However, the major Hollywood Studios used a variety of techniques to deny him access. By this point, Hagen had given up the Quota films which had been his main supply of revenue. His break with the Hollywood Studios also removed their previous support for his films being distributed in Britain and his own distribution company had been unable to achieve this. He was unable to secure the sort of reliable bookings from the domestic market which the larger British studios such as Gaumont British and British International Pictures enjoyed. Without free access to either the British or American market, some of Hagen's expensive productions had barely been able to gain a return on their costs.

Hagen's collapse was part of a wider deterioration in the film industry in 1937 as other producers, including Alexander Korda, encountered similar problems and the number of films produced fell dramatically. Hagen effectively retired from the industry with the collapse of his control of Twickenham Studios. He died in February 1940.

== Selected filmography ==
Producer

- The Passing of Mr. Quin (1928)
- The Feather (1929)
- To What Red Hell (1929)
- At the Villa Rose (1930)
- Rodney Steps In (1931)
- Chin Chin Chinaman (1931)
- Bill's Legacy (1931)
- The Sleeping Cardinal (1931)
- Splinters in the Navy (1931)
- Brown Sugar (1931)
- A Tight Corner (1932)
- Frail Women (1932)
- The Marriage Bond (1932)
- In a Monastery Garden (1932)
- A Safe Proposition (1932)
- The Face at the Window (1932)
- The Crooked Lady (1932)
- Double Dealing (1932)
- Murder at Covent Garden (1932)
- Once Bitten (1932)
- The Umbrella (1933)
- The Roof (1933)
- The Medicine Man (1933)
- The Man Outside (1933)
- The Iron Stair (1933)
- The Ghost Camera (1933)
- Hundred to One (1933)
- Home, Sweet Home (1933)
- Called Back (1933)
- The Shadow (1933)
- Excess Baggage (1933)
- The Lost Chord (1933)
- I Lived with You (1933)
- His Grace Gives Notice (1933)
- This Week of Grace (1933)
- The Wandering Jew (1933)
- A Shot in the Dark (1933)
- Mannequin (1933)
- Flood Tide (1934)
- The Admiral's Secret (1934)
- The Man Who Changed His Name (1934)
- Tangled Evidence (1934)
- Bella Donna (1934)
- The Broken Melody (1934)
- Blind Justice (1934)
- The Night Club Queen (1934)
- Music Hall (1934)
- Kentucky Minstrels (1934)
- The Black Abbot (1934)
- Lily of Killarney (1934)
- Whispering Tongues (1934)
- Say It with Flowers (1934)
- The Lad (1935)
- She Shall Have Music (1935)
- Annie, Leave the Room! (1935)
- That's My Uncle (1935)
- The Rocks of Valpre (1935)
- D'Ye Ken John Peel? (1935)
- Squibs (1935)
- Three Witnesses (1935)
- The Ace of Spades (1935)
- Inside the Room (1935)
- Death on the Set (1935)
- Anything Might Happen (1935)
- Street Song (1935)
- Scrooge (1935)
- Department Store (1935)
- Vintage Wine (1935)
- The Last Journey (1936)
- In the Soup (1936)
- Broken Blossoms (1936)
- Juggernaut (1936)
- Spy of Napoleon (1936)
- Dusty Ermine (1936)
- The Man in the Mirror (1936)
- The Vicar of Bray (1937)
- Death Croons the Blues (1937)
- Clothes and the Woman (1937)
- Underneath the Arches (1937)
- Beauty and the Barge (1937)
- Make It Three (1938)

== Bibliography ==
- Chibnall, Steve. Quota Quickies: The Birth of the British 'B' film. British Film Institute, 2007.
- Richards, Jeffrey (ed.). The Unknown 1930s: An Alternative History of the British Cinema, 1929–1939. I.B. Tauris & Co, 1998.
- Sweet, Matthew. Shepperton Babylon: The Lost Worlds of British Cinema. Faber and Faber, 2005.
