= H. Fowler Mear =

British screenwriter (1888–1985)

Harry Fowler Mear
- Born: 16 June 1888; Edmonton, London, United Kingdom
- Died: May 1985 (aged 96); Exeter, Devon, United Kingdom
- Occupation: Writer
- Years active: 1917–1943 (film)

Harry Fowler Mear (16 June 1888 – May 1985) was a British screenwriter. He spent a number of years at Twickenham Film Studios where his work has been described as "competent but uninspired".

== Partial filmography ==
- The Cost of a Kiss (1917)
- What Next? (1928)
- The Silent House (1929)
- Would You Believe It! (1929)
- Red Pearls (1930)
- You'd Be Surprised! (1930)
- The Last Hour (1930)
- Alibi (1931)
- The Lyons Mail (1931)
- Black Coffee (1931)
- Third Time Lucky (1931)
- Splinters in the Navy (1931)
- The Happy Ending (1931)
- The Professional Guest (1931)
- Number, Please (1931)
- Deadlock (1931)
- Once Bitten (1932)
- The Crooked Lady (1932)
- The Marriage Bond (1932)
- The Lacquered Box (1932)
- In a Monastery Garden (1932)
- Double Dealing (1932)
- The Ghost Camera (1933)
- The Shadow (1933)
- I Lived with You (1933)
- His Grace Gives Notice (1933)
- This Week of Grace (1933)
- The Umbrella (1933)
- Home, Sweet Home (1933)
- The Wandering Jew (1933)
- Lord Edgware Dies (1934)
- Music Hall (1934)
- Whispering Tongues (1934)
- The Admiral's Secret (1934)
- The Broken Melody (1934)
- Lily of Killarney (1934)
- Say It with Flowers (1934)
- Bella Donna (1934)
- The Night Club Queen (1934)
- Flood Tide (1934)
- The Man Who Changed His Name (1934)
- The Triumph of Sherlock Holmes (1935)
- She Shall Have Music (1935)
- Squibs (1935)
- D'Ye Ken John Peel? (1935)
- Inside the Room (1935)
- Department Store (1935)
- The Morals of Marcus (1935)
- Three Witnesses (1935)
- Scrooge (1935)
- The Last Journey (1936)
- Eliza Comes to Stay (1936)
- Dusty Ermine (1936)
- In the Soup (1936)
- Talking Feet (1937)
- The Vicar of Bray (1937)
- Riding High (1937)
- Death Croons the Blues (1937)
- Song of the Forge (1937)
- Underneath the Arches (1937)
- Little Miss Somebody (1937)
- Stepping Toes (1938)

== Bibliography ==
- Richards, Jeffrey (ed.). The Unknown 1930s: An Alternative History of the British Cinema, 1929- 1939. I.B. Tauris & Co, 1998.
