= Twickenham Film Studios =

British film studio

Coordinates: 51.4559°N 0.3186°W

Twickenham Film Studios Limited
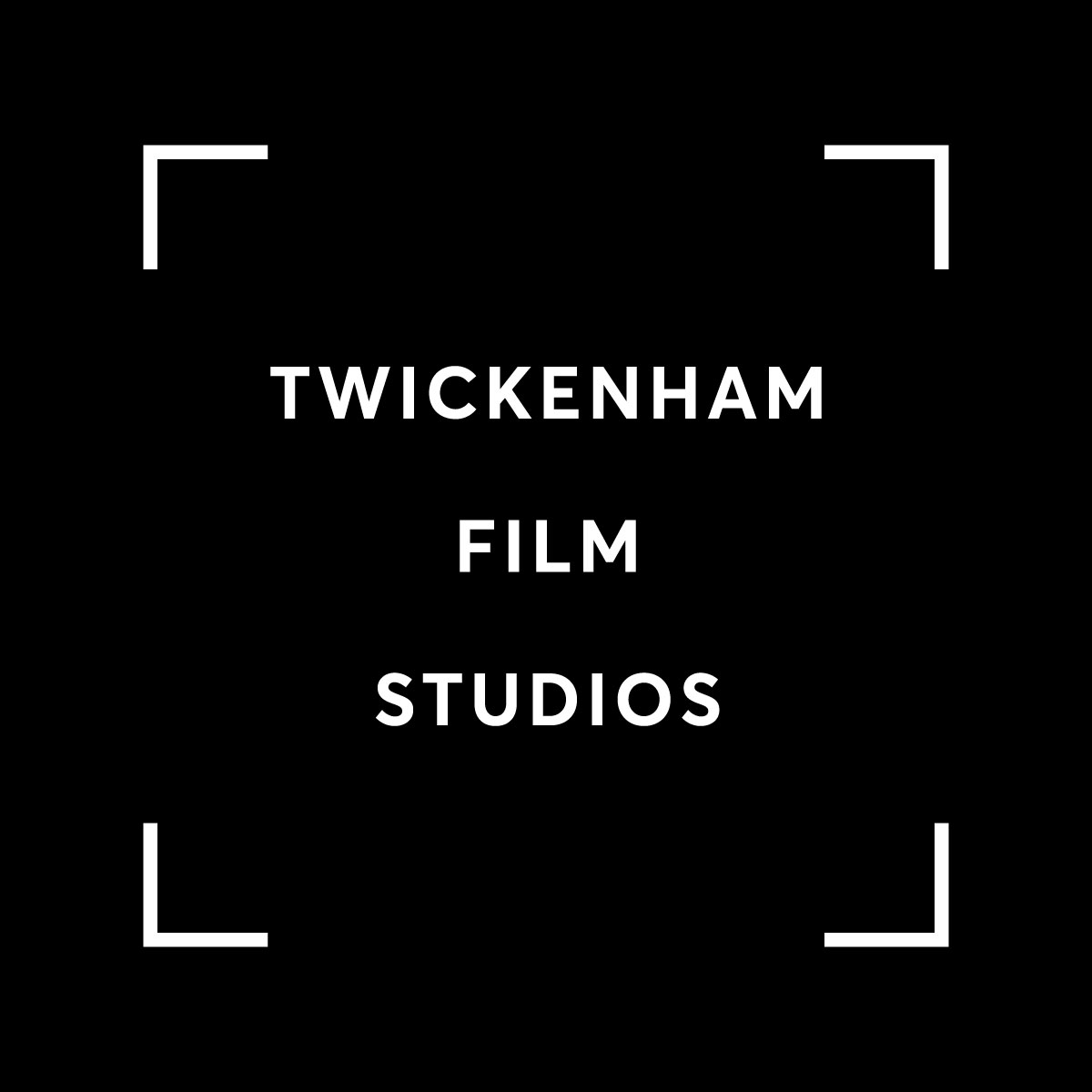

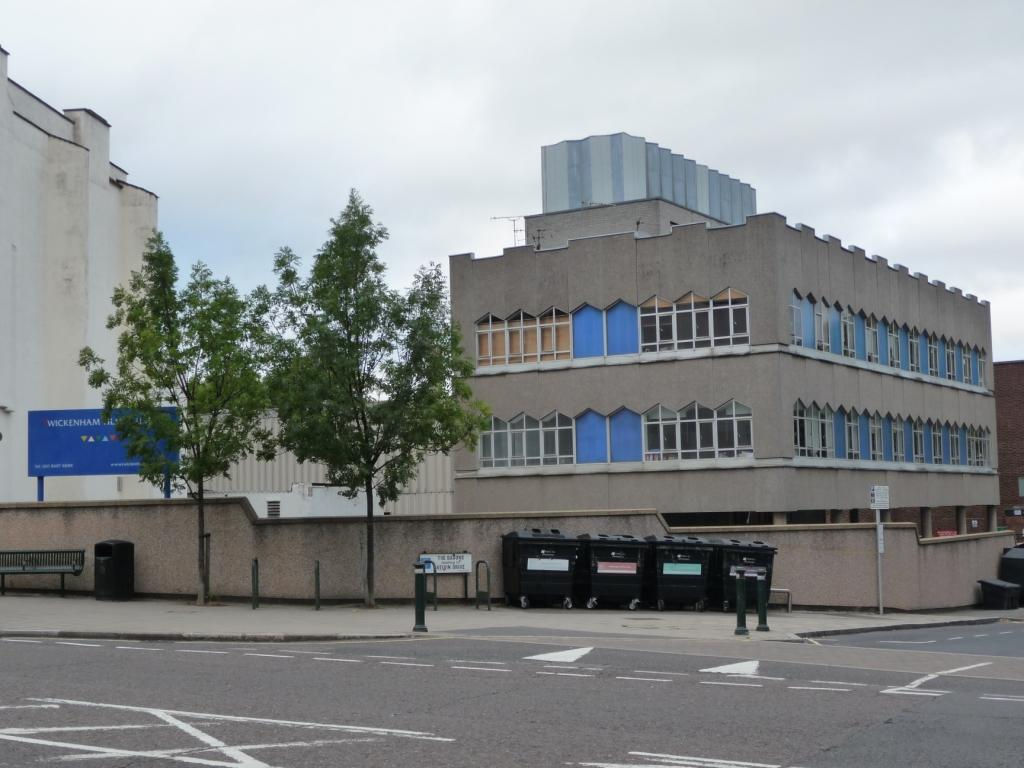
- View of part of the studios
- Type: Limited company
- Industry: Film and TV
- Founded: 1913; 113 years ago
- Headquarters: The Barons, St Margarets, London, United Kingdom
- Website: www.twickenhamstudios.com

Twickenham Film Studios is a film studio in St Margarets, in the London Borough of Richmond upon Thames, that is used by various motion picture and television companies. It was established in 1913 by Ralph Jupp on the site of a former ice rink. At the time of its original construction, it was the largest film studio in the United Kingdom.

In February 2012, it was announced that due to the studio going into administration, it would close before June, just a year before its centenary. The studio was subsequently saved from closure, with a new owner acquiring the studio in August 2012.

The studios were acquired in February 2020 by The Creative District Improvement Co. with backing from British Airways Pension Fund and TIME + SPACE Studios as operator on a long lease to run the studios.

== History ==
=== London Film ===
In 1913, the studios were constructed by the newly formed London Film Company, and were at that time the largest in Britain. London Film was a leading producer during the First World War, but the company struggled and went out of business in 1920. Twickenham Studios were sold off, and were used for various independent productions.

=== Julius Hagen ===
During the 1930s, the studio was run by Julius Hagen. Hagen built up his business making Quota quickies for major American studios, who were required by law to produce a certain number of British films each year to be allowed to release their pictures into the lucrative British market. Hagen became very efficient at producing large numbers of these quickies of varying quality. He often filmed all day, and then brought in different crews and actors to work through the night.

Following the success of Alexander Korda's The Private Life of Henry VIII (1933), Hagen became interested in producing films which could be released in America. Twickenham took on more quality work such as the Gracie Fields vehicle This Week of Grace. This ultimately led Hagen to stop making quickies entirely and focus exclusively on "quality" productions. He began to make more expensive films, such as Seymour Hicks's Scrooge (1935) and Spy of Napoleon for which he hoped to gain an international market. Hagen spent £100,000 rebuilding Twickenham Studios and acquired studios in other parts of London. He also broke with his established distributors and attempted to distribute his own films. This proved a mistake, however, as the major American studios blocked his entry into their market, while his films failed to gain access to the British market. In 1937, Hagen's company went bankrupt as part of a wider slump in British filmmaking that year, bringing an end to his reign at Twickenham.

Numerous films have been made at Twickenham Film Studios since the end of Hagen's tenure, including Carol Reed's The Stars Look Down (1939).

=== Post-war ===
In 1946, Alfred Shipman formed Alliance Film Studios Limited, controlling Riverside, Southall and Twickenham Film Studios. After his death in 1956, his two sons Gerald (father of Piers Flint-Shipman) and Kenneth Shipman took control of the studios, with Kenneth later going on to form Alliance Film Distributors.

=== Later films ===
In the 1960s, classic films such as Alfie (1966) starring Michael Caine, The Italian Job (1969), featuring Caine and Noël Coward, and Roman Polanski's first English language film, Repulsion (1965), were made at Twickenham. Be My Guest (also 1965) features Jerry Lee Lewis, an early appearance by the young actor Steve Marriott, and The Nashville Teens. The first two Beatles feature films were made at Twickenham: A Hard Day's Night (1964) and Help! (1965), and also their promotional film for "Hey Jude" (1968). The Beatles used the studios while rehearsing music for their album Let It Be. A film was made of some of the sessions; both the film and the album were released in 1970. Footage from Twickenham was the setting of the first of a three-part documentary about these sessions directed by Peter Jackson.

In the 1980s, the studio was used for The Mirror Crack'd (1980), An American Werewolf in London (1981), Blade Runner (1982), and A Fish Called Wanda (1988). Later films include The Others (2001), The Crucible (1996), Sweet Revenge (1998), and the animated film We're Back! A Dinosaur's Story (1993).

== Facilities ==
=== Sound stages ===
Twickenham Film Studios has three stages that are sound-proofed and operate on a 'four wall' basis. Dressing rooms, star apartments, make-up, hairdressing and wardrobe departments and camera rooms are situated adjacent to each stage, with nearby prop rooms, art departments and office suites. The largest, Stage 1, has a concrete water tank, housed underneath the floor boards. A camera pit at one end allows underwater viewing through a glass screen. This stage has been used for innumerable films, including the two Beatles films A Hard Day's Night and Help!, An American Werewolf in London (1981) and A Fish Called Wanda (1988). Kenneth Branagh's Sleuth (2007) was shot on this stage. Films shot on Stage 3 include Roman Polanski's Repulsion, Karel Reisz's The French Lieutenant's Woman (1981), and Lewis Gilbert's Shirley Valentine (1989). Later films include Layer Cake (2004), directed by Matthew Vaughn, and Love in the Time of Cholera (2007), directed by Mike Newell. The thriller Before I Go To Sleep (2014), written and directed by Rowan Joffé, which features Nicole Kidman and Colin Firth, was shot at the studios early in 2013.

More recently, Twickenham Film Studios carried out script-to-screen work on Ten Percent, the British remake of French series Call My Agent. Recent work also includes Kenneth Branagh's Belfast, Top Gun: Maverick, Oscar-winning Bohemian Rhapsody, Last Night in Soho and House of Gucci.

=== Post-production ===
The studios' post production facilities include a state-of-the-art sound centre, at the heart of which is the refurbished The Richard Attenborough Theatre, named after Richard Attenborough, who used to have his production offices at the studios.

Following major modernisation and expansion in recent years, Twickenham Film Studios has extensively refurbished and upgraded its two largest re-recording theatres, making the studios the most advanced sound department in the UK. The Dubbing Theatres have 4K DCI Projection and HDX Pro Tools rigs as standard.

It is one of the studios in the UK which has been Dolby Premier certified. Other facilities include a second dubbing theatre, ADR / Foley Theatre, numerous cutting rooms, office facilities and sound transfer facilities.

=== Film productions ===
Films that have used the facilities, production and post production, include:

- Spice World (1997)
- Reign of Fire (2002)
- Nicholas Nickleby (2002)
- In America (2002)
- Imagining Argentina (2003)
- Calendar Girls (2003)
- Mona Lisa Smile (2003)
- Wimbledon (2004)
- Stage Beauty (2004)
- Laws of Attraction (2004)
- Mindhunters (2004)
- Around the World in 80 Days (2004)
- Resident Evil: Apocalypse (2004)
- Derailed (2005)
- Sahara (2005)
- Renaissance (2006)
- The Magic Flute (2006)
- Closing the Ring (2007)
- 1408 (2007)
- Elizabeth: The Golden Age (2007)
- Me and Orson Welles (2008)
- Flashbacks of a Fool (2008)
- Inkheart (2008)
- The Other Man (2008)
- Killshot (2008)
- Angels & Demons (2009)
- My One and Only (2009)
- Burke & Hare (2010)
- Jackboots on Whitehall (2010)
- Kick-Ass (2010)
- Bonded by Blood (2010)
- The Debt (2010)
- Wild Target (2010)
- The Best Exotic Marigold Hotel (2011)
- War Horse (2011)
- Horrid Henry: The Movie (2011)
- Albatross (2011)
- The Iron Lady (2011)
- My Week with Marilyn (2011)
- Bel Ami (2012)
- The Wedding Video (2012)
- Outside Bet (2012)
- All in Good Time (2012)
- Before I Go To Sleep (2013)
- World War Z (2013)
- Syrenia (2015)
- Victor Frankenstein (2016)

=== TV productions ===
TV shows that have used the facilities, production and post production, include:

- Mongrels (2010-2011)
- Teletubbies (2015–2018)
- McMafia (2017)
- Black Mirror (2014–2018)
- The Buccaneers (1956)
- Tipping Point (2015–2016)
- Topsy and Tim (2013–2015)
- Crims (2015)
- Josh (2015–2017)
- Inside No. 9 (2015–present)
- Agatha Christie's Poirot (1990)

== Bibliography ==
- Richards, Jeffrey (ed.). The Unknown 1930s: An Alternative History of the British Cinema, 1929–1939. I.B. Tauris, 1998.
