= List of National Labour MPs =

This is a list of National Labour MPs. It includes all members of Parliament who sat in the British House of Commons who were sponsored by the National Labour Organisation.

Member	Constituency	Start	End	Notes
Craigie Mason Aitchison	Kilmarnock	3 September 1931	2 October 1933	Originally elected as a Labour MP; appointed Lord Advocate in the National Government. Re-elected in the 1931 general election and served until he was appointed Lord Justice Clerk.
Sir Ernest Nathaniel Bennett	Cardiff Central	1 September 1931	14 June 1945	Originally elected as a Labour MP. Announced his support for the National Government on 1 September 1931. Re-elected in the 1931 and 1935 general elections and served until the organisation was dissolved; defeated standing as a National candidate in the 1945 general election.
Archibald George Church	Wandsworth Central	8 September 1931	7 October 1931	Originally elected as a Labour MP. Initially sceptical, Church supported the Government once Parliament resumed. He was defeated in the 1931 general election, standing as a National candidate in London University.
Richard Douglas Denman	Leeds Central	10 September 1931	14 June 1945	Originally elected as a Labour MP. Abstained in the first vote after the National Government was set up but announced his support shortly afterwards. Re-elected in the 1931 and 1935 general elections and served until the organisation was dissolved; retired at the end of the Parliament.
Abraham John Flint	Ilkeston	27 October 1931	25 October 1935	Gained his seat from Labour in the 1931 general election. Retired at the end of the Parliament.
Sir George Masterman Gillett	Finsbury	31 August 1931	25 October 1935	Originally elected as a Labour MP; was a junior Minister in the Labour Government. Announced his support of the Government and was appointed to the National Government. Re-elected in the 1931 general election; defeated standing for re-election in 1935.
Derwent Hall Caine	Liverpool Everton	23 September 1931	7 October 1931	Originally elected as a Labour MP. Away from Parliament after the death of his father, announced support for the National Government on his return. Not endorsed by the Conservatives, he was defeated for re-election in the 1931 general election.
George Wilfrid Holford Knight	Nottingham South	2 September 1931	25 October 1935	Originally elected as a Labour MP. Announced his support for the Government before Parliament resumed. Re-elected in the 1931 general election and retired at the end of the Parliament.
Sir William Allen Jowitt	Preston	28 August 1931	7 October 1931	Originally elected as a Liberal MP; after he was appointed to the Labour Government was re-elected as a Labour MP. Retained office in the National Government. Defeated standing for re-election in Combined English Universities at the 1931 general election. Subsequently rejoined the Labour Party and served again as a Labour MP from 1939 until given a Peerage in 1945.
William Stephen Richard King-Hall	Ormskirk	27 October 1939	23 February 1942	Elected in a by-election in a National Labour seat. Left the Parliamentary group to sit as an Independent. Defeated for re-election at the 1945 general election standing as a National Independent, opposed by the Conservatives.
Kenneth Martin Lindsay	Kilmarnock	2 November 1933	28 May 1943	Elected in a by-election in a National Labour seat. Re-elected in the 1935 general election. Left the Parliamentary group to sit as an Independent, and re-elected as an Independent in Combined English Universities in the 1945 general election. Retired at the end of the Parliament.
James Alexander Lovat-Fraser	Lichfield	2 September 1931	18 March 1938	Originally elected as a Labour MP. Announced his support for the Government before Parliament resumed. Re-elected in the 1931 and 1935 general elections and served until his death.
Malcolm James MacDonald	Bassetlaw	24 August 1931	25 October 1935	Originally elected as a Labour MP. As the son of Ramsay MacDonald, he was always bound to support his father. Re-elected in the 1931 election; defeated for re-election in the 1935 general election.
Malcolm James MacDonald	Ross and Cromarty	10 February 1936	14 June 1945	Elected in a byelection in a Liberal National seat. Served until the organisation was dissolved. Retired at the end of the Parliament.
James Ramsay MacDonald	Seaham	24 August 1931	25 October 1935	Originally elected as a Labour MP. Formed the National Government. Re-elected in the 1931 election; defeated for re-election in the 1935 general election.
James Ramsay MacDonald	Combined Scottish Universities	31 January 1936	9 November 1937	Elected in a byelection in a Conservative seat. Served until his death.
Sydney Frank Markham	Chatham	16 September 1931	7 October 1931	Originally elected as a Labour MP. Absent from the first votes after the National Government was set up but began supporting the Government later that month. Not endorsed by the Conservatives, he withdrew his bid for re-election in the 1931 general election.
Sydney Frank Markham	Nottingham South	14 November 1935	14 June 1945	Elected in the 1935 general election, retaining a National Labour seat. Served until the organisation was dissolved. Defeated for re-election at the 1945 general election standing as a National candidate. Subsequently joined the Conservative Party and served as a Conservative MP for Buckingham from 1951 to 1964.
Hon Harold George Nicolson	Leicester West	14 November 1935	14 June 1945	Elected in the 1935 general election, gaining a seat from the Liberal Party. Served until the organisation was dissolved. Defeated for re-election at the 1945 general election standing as a National candidate.
Francis Noel Palmer	Tottenham South	27 October 1931	25 October 1935	Gained his seat from Labour in the 1931 general election. Defeated for re-election at the 1935 general election.
Sir Samuel Thomas Rosbotham	Ormskirk	5 September 1931	11 October 1939	Originally elected as a Labour MP. Announced his support for the Government before Parliament returned. Re-elected in the 1931 and 1935 general elections and served until he resigned in order to retire.
Philip Snowden	Colne Valley	25 August 1931	7 October 1931	Originally elected as a Labour MP, was Chancellor of the Exchequer in the Labour Government. Re-appointed to office in the National Government but had already decided not to seek re-election.
James Henry Thomas	Derby	25 August 1931	11 June 1936	Originally elected as a Labour MP, was Secretary of State for Dominion Affairs in the Labour Government. Re-appointed to office in the National Government. Re-elected in the 1931 and 1935 general elections and served until he resigned over a financial scandal.
Sir John Vigers Worthington	Forest of Dean	27 October 1931	25 October 1935	Gained his seat from Labour in the 1931 general election. Defeated for re-election at the 1935 general election.

== Abstainers ==
Five Labour MPs are known to have deliberately abstained from voting on 8 September 1931 in the first House of Commons division (vote) called after the formation of the National Government. Of the five, only one (Richard Denman) subsequently became a National Labour MP. The identities of the other four who had indicated a degree of alienation from the Labour Party and of support for the National Government, even if not committing themselves to it absolutely.

- Sir Ralph Norman Angell (Bradford North) voted against the Government in a division the following day, but announced his decision not to seek re-election on 24 September 1931 while stressing that he was not leaving the Labour Party.
- Edith Picton-Turbervill (The Wrekin) also voted against the Government in a division the following day. She was re-adopted as the Labour candidate for her constituency at the 1931 general election but was defeated for re-election.
- George Russell Strauss (Lambeth North) also voted against the Government in a division the following day. Although defeated for re-election in 1931, he returned in a 1934 by-election at which he defeated a National Labour candidate, and then served until he retired in 1979.
- Josiah Clement Wedgwood (Newcastle-under-Lyme) first voted against the Government on 14 September 1931. As a member of the Independent Labour Party he refused to sign a pledge to abide by the standing orders of the Parliamentary Labour Party and so fought for re-election without official endorsement at the 1931 general election, but was re-elected unopposed. He was readmitted to the PLP and served until elevated to the Peerage in 1942.

== Graphical representation ==
Constituency	1931	1931	1933	1935	36	37	38	39	42	43
Cardiff Central	Bennett									
Leeds Central	Denman									
Nottingham South	Knight			Markham						
Kilmarnock	Aitchison		Lindsay							
Ormskirk	Rosbotham							King-Hall		
Lichfield	Lovat-Fraser									
Derby	Thomas									
Finsbury	Gillett									
Bassetlaw	M. MacDonald									
Seaham	R. MacDonald									
Wandsworth Central	Church									
Liverpool Everton	Caine									
Preston	Jowitt									
Chatham	Markham									
Colne Valley	Snowden									
Ilkeston		Flint								
Tottenham South		Palmer								
Forest of Dean		Worthington								
Leicester West				Nicolson						
Ross and Cromarty					M. MacDonald					
Combined Scottish Universities					R. MacDonald					
No. of National Labour MPs	15	13	13	8	9	8	7	7	6	5
