= A Safety Match =

A Safety Match may refer to:

- A Safety Match (play)
- A Safety Match (novel)
