= The Midshipmaid (play) =

1931 play by Ian Hay and Stephen King-Hall

- Original language: English
- Written by: Ian Hay; Stephen King-Hall
- Genre: Comedy

Premiere
- Date: 1931

The Midshipmaid is a 1931 British comedy play by Ian Hay and Stephen King-Hall, which ran for 227 performances at the Shaftesbury Theatre in London's West End. The following year Hay wrote a novel based on the play.

== Original cast ==
- Able Seaman Pook - A.W. Baskcomb
- Bandmaster Tappett - Roger Maxwell
- Celia Newbiggin - Jane Baxter
- Commander ffosbery - Basil Foster
- Cora Golightly - Marjorie Playfair
- Corporal of Marines/Leading Torpedoman Huggins - Henry Thompson
- Dora Golightly - Kathleen Kelly
- Guest - Nancy Russell
- Instructor Lt. Commander Tomkinson - Peter Mather
- Lady Mildred Martyn - Mary Clare
- Lord Chinley - Terence Downing
- Lt. Commander Valentine - Charlton Morton
- Lt. Kingsford - Edward Harben
- Lucy - Ivy des Voeux
- Major Spink - Michael Shepley
- Marine Bundy - S. Victor Stanley
- Marine Robbins - D.J. Williams
- Marine Smith - Albert Arlen
- Midshipman Golightly - Humphrey Morton
- Sick Bay Attendant Slingsby/Leading Stoker Hammond - Oliver Gordon
- Sir Percy Newbiggin - Clive Currie

== Film adaptation ==
In 1932 it was made into a film of the same title by Gainsborough Pictures, starring Jessie Matthews and Basil Sydney.

== Bibliography ==
- Goble, Alan. The Complete Index to Literary Sources in Film. Walter de Gruyter, 1999.
- Wearing, J.P. The London Stage 1930-1939: A Calendar of Productions, Performers, and Personnel. Rowman & Littlefield, 2014.
