= The Midshipmaid =

1932 British comedy film

- Directed by: Albert de Courville
- Written by: Stafford Dickens
- Based on: the play The Midshipmaid by Ian Hay & Stephen King-Hall
- Produced by: Michael Balcon (uncredited)
- Starring: Jessie Matthews; A. W. Baskcomb; Basil Sydney
- Cinematography: Mutz Greenbaum
- Edited by: Ian Dalrymple; Ralph Kemplen
- Music by: Jack Beaver (uncredited)
- Production company: Gaumont British Picture Corporation
- Distributed by: Woolf & Freedman Film Service, England
- Release dates: 8 December 1932 (London, England)
- Running time: 84 minutes
- Country: United Kingdom
- Language: English

The Midshipmaid (U.S. title: Midshipmaid Gob) is a 1932 British comedy film directed by Albert de Courville and starring Jessie Matthews, Frederick Kerr, Basil Sydney and Nigel Bruce. It was written by Stafford Dickens based on the 1931 play of the same title by Ian Hay and Stephen King-Hall. John Mills makes his film debut in a supporting role. It was shot at the Lime Grove Studios, with sets designed by the art director Alfred Junge.

== Plot ==
Pompous economy expert Sir Percy Newbiggin visits the Naval Fleet in Malta to see what cuts can be made in their expenditure. The officers all fall over themselves to woo his beautiful daughter Celia, who accompanies him: she becomes engaged to the son of the First Sea Lord and her father decides to leave economics to the Navy.

== Cast ==
- Jessie Matthews as Celia Newbiggin
- Frederick Kerr as Sir Percy Newbiggin
- Basil Sydney as Commander Fosberry
- Nigel Bruce as Major Spink
- A. W. Baskcomb as AB Pook
- Claud Allister as Chinley
- Anthony Bushell as Lieutenant Valentine
- Edwin Lawrence as Tappett
- Archie Glen as Bunduy
- Albert Rebla as Robbins
- John Mills as Golightly
- Anthony Holles as Lieutenant Kingsford
- George Zucco as Lord Dore
- Joyce Kirby as Dora
- Steve Condos as horse
- Nick Condos as horse
- Hay Plumb as sailor
- John Turnbull as officer
- Wilma Vanne as Cora

== Reception ==
Film Weekly wrote: "Thin musical comedy, padded out with broad music-hall humour of the 'rollicking' type."

Kine Weekly wrote: "A rollicking romantic comedy with a refreshing nautical flavour, liberally and expensively adapted from the successful stage play. ... Fred Kerr is immense as Sir Percy and gets under the skin of the type. Jessie Matthews is a winsome, light-hearted Celia, Basil Sydney is a handsome Ffosberry, and A. W. Baskcomb, Edwin Lawrence and Nigel Bruce are amazingly good in frank comedy roles. Albert De Courville has marshalled his talent with great skill, and under his leadership the versatile players put the light story over with infectious enthusiasm."

Variety wrote: "Plot is of small consequence, its principal feature being the giving of a concert on board a British battleship stationed at Malta. Considerable fun is derived from this concert by the crew, which includes A. W. Baskcomb in the same role he created on the stage, Rebla, the juggler, Condos Brothers as a dancing horse and Archie Glen giving his familiar vaudeville impersonation of a souse dancing with a dummy. Then there is silly ass monocled gentleman, as done by Claude Allister, exactly as he did it in the States for years. ... Fred Kerr, who heads the cast, has a thankless role, which he carries satisfactorily and Nigel Bruce is utterly wasted in a bit. The atmosphere of the battleship is admirable, indicating careful attention to detail, and the direction is so speedy the specialists are given small opportunity to shine."
