= Carry On Admiral =

1957 British comedy film by Val Guest

Carry on Admiral
- Theatrical release poster
- Directed by: Val Guest
- Screenplay by: Val Guest
- Based on: Off the Record by Ian Hay & Stephen King-Hall
- Starring: David Tomlinson; Ronald Shiner; Joan Sims
- Cinematography: Arthur Grant
- Edited by: John Pomeroy
- Music by: Philip Green
- Distributed by: Renown Pictures Corporation
- Release date: 14 May 1957 (Britain)
- Country: Great Britain
- Language: English

Carry on Admiral (U.S. title: The Ship Was Loaded) is a 1957 British comedy film directed by Val Guest and featuring David Tomlinson and Ronald Shiner. Joan Hickson also made an appearance in this film. It was based on the 1947 stage play Off the Record, written by Ian Hay.

Joan Sims, who later became prominent in the Carry On series, has a small part. It pre-dates and was not part of the Carry On series, and does not share any regular cast members beyond Sims, though it is similar in tone and style to the earliest films in the series.

== Plot ==
In the course of a drunken reunion, two old friends (one a junior Government minister, the other a Royal Navy officer in uniform about to take command for the first time) switch clothes before passing out. Next morning, their changed clothes result in a series of cases of mistaken identity. The film follows the efforts of each to reunite himself with his own destiny.

== Cast ==
- David Tomlinson as Tom Baker
- Peggy Cummins as Susan Lashwood
- Brian Reece as Peter Fraser
- Eunice Gayson as Jane Godfrey
- A. E. Matthews as Admiral Sir Maximillian Godfrey, K.C.B.
- Joan Sims as Mary, Chambermaid
- Lionel Murton as Psychiatrist
- Reginald Beckwith as Receptionist
- Ronald Shiner as "Salty" Simpson
- Peter Coke as Lieutenant Lashwood
- Derek Blomfield as Lieutenant Dodson
- Tom Gill as Petty Officer
- Sam Kydd as Attendant

== Production ==
Val Guest said "George Minter approached me to see if we could make a film of it [the play], and we knew we couldn’t use the title Off the Record because it was a terrible title and it was all about the navy, and I came up with a series of titles of which we agreed we all liked Carry on Admiral... George Minter, unfortunately, didn’t register it, it was never registered and I don’t know why he didn’t, and it was just pilfered, willy-nilly, by the boys when they made the Carry On series."

The fictional ship HMS Sherwood in the film is played by a Daring-class destroyer. Other ships shown include the battleship HMS Vanguard and the frigate HMS Paladin during the title sequence, two Dido-class cruisers in early background scenes, and a Loch-class frigate during the closing credits. Several scenes were filmed in Admiralty House, in Portsmouth Naval Base.

== Reception ==
=== Box office ===
According to Kinematograph Weekly the film was "in the money" at the British box office in 1957.

=== Critical ===
The Monthly Film Bulletin wrote: "This traditional British farce does not look at all at home on a wide screen. Although the play from which it is adapted was first produced in 1947, it is essentially a period piece – vintage of the early thirties. It makes up in zeal what it lacks in wit and is played and directed with tremendous gusto."

The Radio Times Guide to Films gave the film 2/5 stars, writing: "This is not one of the Carry Ons, but an unremarkable screen adaptation of an almost forgotten stage farce. Also known as The Ship Was Loaded, this comedy of errors has more in common with radio hit The Navy Lark than its saucier namesakes. David Tomlinson and Brian Reece goof gamely as the civil servant and the sailor whose identities get muddled, but it's A.E. Matthews (at the ripe old age of 87) who steals the show."

In British Sound Films: The Studio Years 1928–1959 David Quinlan rated the film as "mediocre", writing: "Hoary old naval farce, played with vigour but pretty antiquated."
