= The Midshipmaid (novel) =

Comedy novel

- First edition
- Author: Ian Hay
- Language: English
- Genre: Comedy
- Publisher: Hodder & Stoughton
- Publication date: 1933
- Publication place: United Kingdom
- Media type: Print

The Midshipmaid is a 1933 comedy novel by the British writer Ian Hay. It is based on his 1931 play The Midshipmaid, co-written with Stephen King-Hall, about the visit of an economic expert to the British fleet to see what cuts can be made and the adventurous flirtation of his daughter with the ship's officers.

== Bibliography ==
- George Watson & Ian R. Willison. The New Cambridge Bibliography of English Literature, Volume 4. CUP, 1972.
