= The Sporting Lover =

1926 film directed by Alan Hale

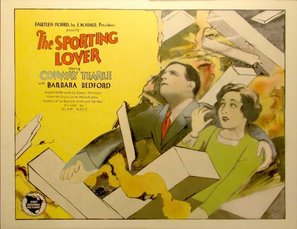
- Directed by: Alan Hale
- Written by: Carey Wilson; Malcolm Stuart Boylan
- Based on: Good Luck by Ian Hay
- Produced by: Edward Small; E.M. Asher
- Starring: Conway Tearle; Barbara Bedford; Ward Crane
- Cinematography: Faxon M. Dean; Robert Newhard
- Edited by: Edward M. Roskam
- Production company: Faultless Pictures
- Distributed by: First National Pictures
- Release date: June 17, 1926 (New York)
- Running time: 70 minutes
- Country: United States
- Language: Silent (English intertitles)

The Sporting Lover is a 1926 American silent sports romance film directed by Alan Hale and starring Conway Tearle, Barbara Bedford and Ward Crane. It was based on the British play Good Luck by Ian Hay.

== Plot ==
During the First World War an American officer and a British aristocrat fall in love but are separated. After the war he returns to find her engaged to another man. The issue is settled by a bet on The Derby horse race.

Captain Terrance Connaughton loses his stable of horses in a card game with Algernon Cravens. The next day he is wounded and taken to a military hospital where he meets and falls in love with Lady Gwendolyn. After an attack on the hospital Captain Terrence and Lady Gwen are separated for a while until the end of the war, where Terrance returns home without anything. To Captain Terrences surprise, Cravens, has made Lady Gwen promise to marry him and has entered the horses he won from Terrance in the National Derby. Terrance goes to London to attend the Derby and sees Lady Gwen again. The importance of the derby is ultimately based on who Lady Gwen can be with.

== Cast ==
- Conway Tearle as Captain Terrance Connaughton
- Barbara Bedford as Lady Gwendolyn
- Ward Crane as Captain Sir Phillip Barton
- Arthur Rankin as Algernon Cravens
- Charles McHugh as Paddy O'Brien – Connaughton's Servant
- Johnny Fox as Aloysius Patrick O'Brien – Paddy's Son
- Bodil Rosing as Nora O'Brien
- George Ovey as Jockey

== See also ==
- List of films about horses
- List of films about horse racing
