= The Sport of Kings (1931 film) =

1931 film

- Directed by: Victor Saville
- Written by: Angus MacPhail
- Based on: The Sport of Kings by Ian Hay
- Produced by: Victor Saville
- Starring: Leslie Henson; Hugh Wakefield; Gordon Harker
- Cinematography: Alex Bryce; Freddie Young
- Edited by: Thorold Dickinson
- Production company: Gainsborough Pictures
- Distributed by: Ideal Films
- Release date: 23 February 1931
- Running time: 90 minutes
- Country: United Kingdom
- Language: English

The Sport of Kings is a 1931 British comedy film directed by Victor Saville and starring Leslie Henson, Hugh Wakefield and Gordon Harker. It was written by Angus MacPhail based on the 1924 play of the same title by Ian Hay. The film was made by Gainsborough Pictures at British and Dominions Elstree Studios with sets designed by the art director Walter Murton.

== Premise ==
Algie Sprigg makes a bet with his friend Sir Reginald Toothill, that he will make Amos Purdie, a stern and sanctimonious Justice of the Peace, place a bet on a horse. He succeeds, and Purdie loses £4,000. Advised by his butler, Purdie becomes a bookie for a day and "welshes", keeping the stakes given to him by punters. Algie and Toothill protect his identity, and the escapade has left Purdie more human than before.

== Cast ==
- Leslie Henson as Amos Purdie
- Hugh Wakefield as Alfie Sprigge
- Gordon Harker as Bates
- Jack Melford as Sir Reginald Toothill
- Willie Graham as Albert
- Dorothy Boyd as Dulcie Primrose
- Renee Clama as Jane
- Mary Jerrold as Mrs. Purdie
- Barbara Gott as Cook
- Daphne Scorer as Lizzie
- Wally Patch as Panama Pete

== Reception ==
=== Box office ===
The film was a financial success.

=== Critical ===
Film Weekly wrote: "That awful cliche, a 'feast of a fun,' applies all too aptly to this picture for one to resist it. With Leslie Henson at the top of his form, Hugh Wakefield eminently likeable, and Gordon Harker scowlingly homesick for the turf, the film has a cast which keeps laughter on the lips from start to finish."

Kine Weekly wrote: "Ian Hay's successful stage farce has been transferred excellently to the screen by Victor Saville, and there is no doubt that it will repeat its success. The racing atmosphere and the acting of a strong cast make an entertainment which is essentially British in character and one which will attract every class of patron. ... Leslie Henson's expressions are a source of laughter throughout the picture, quite apart from the lines he has to utter."

Picture Show wrote: "Talkie adaptation of Ian Hay's famous racing comedy, which tells of an anti-betting crank whose cupidity leads him to his downfall and, final, a brief and inglorious career as a bookmaker. The three chief players get the utmost out of their parts, the dialogue is bright, direction competent. A British comedy that is well worth seeing."
