= Douglas Glover (politician) =

British politician

Colonel Douglas Glover TD

Member of Parliament for Ormskirk
- In office 12 November 1953 – 29 May 1970
- Preceded by: Arthur Salter
- Succeeded by: Harold Soref

Personal details
- Born: 13 February 1908 London, England
- Died: 15 January 1982 (aged 73)
- Party: Conservative

Colonel Sir Douglas Glover, TD (13 February 1908 – 15 January 1982) was a Conservative Party politician in the United Kingdom who served as Member of Parliament for Ormskirk, in Lancashire, from 1953 until 1970, and was a colonel in the Army during World War II. Sometime Chairman of the Conservative Party and of the British Anti-Slavery Society.

== Biography ==
Glover was educated at Giggleswick School, where he was later became a governor, and where the "Sir Douglas Glover Memorial Lecture" is held periodically in his memory.

On leaving school in 1925 he entered the family textile business, S.B. Glover & Co. Ltd., eventually becoming managing director. He also served for many years on the council of the Wholesale Textile Association of Great Britain.

In 1934, Glover married first wife Agnes May Brown; she died in 1976. Later that year, he married Margaret Eleanor Hurlimann.

At the outbreak of the Second World War in 1939, Glover was a subaltern in the 7th Battalion, the Manchester Regiment, TA; in 1945, he was appointed to the command of the 2nd Battalion Princess Louise's Kensington Regiment in North-West Europe; and, from 1947 to 1950, he commanded the 9th Battalion, the Manchester Regiment, TA. For his services in the Netherlands, he was made Knight Officer of the Order of Orange-Nassau in 1947.

After the war, Glover returned to the family business, whilst also contesting the parliamentary seats of Blackburn in 1945, and Stalybridge and Hyde in both 1950 and 1951 before being elected as the member for Ormskirk in a 1953 by-election, which he represented until 1970. Glover was knighted in 1960.

In later life, he moved to Switzerland where Baroness Thatcher, a close friend, would often spend her summer holidays visiting Sir Douglas and his wife. Glover died of cancer in Switzerland in January 1982. He was 73. Thatcher attended his Swiss funeral service and the Duke of Edinburgh was represented at this London memorial service.

Parliament of the United Kingdom
Preceded by Arthur Salter	Member of Parliament for Ormskirk; 1953–1970	Succeeded by Harold Soref
