= Arthur Salter, 1st Baron Salter =

British politician and academic (1881–1975)

The Right Honourable The Lord Salter GBE KCB PC
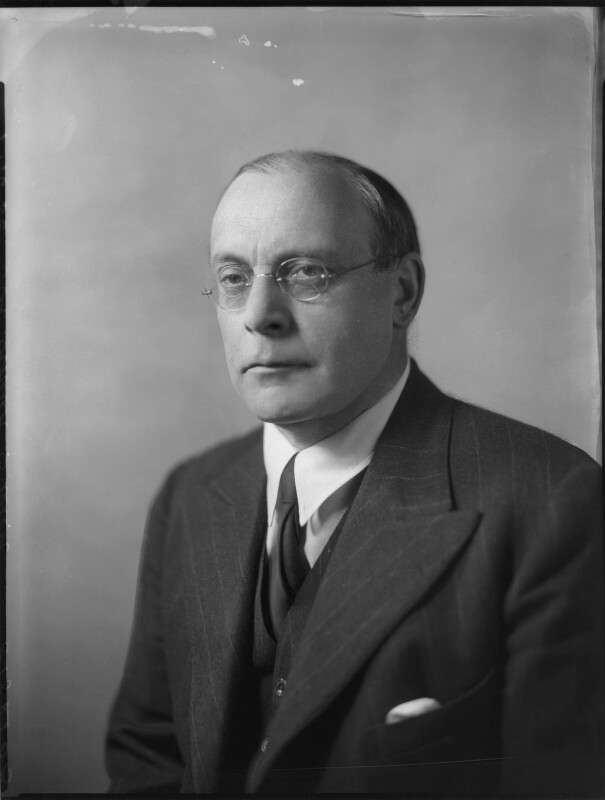
- Salter in 1936

Minister of Materials
- In office 24 November 1952 – 1 September 1953
- Prime Minister: Winston Churchill
- Preceded by: The Viscount Swinton
- Succeeded by: The Lord Woolton

Minister for Economic Affairs
- In office 26 October 1951 – 24 November 1952
- Prime Minister: Winston Churchill
- Preceded by: Hugh Gaitskell
- Succeeded by: George Brown (Sec. of State)

Chancellor of the Duchy of Lancaster
- In office 25 May 1945 – 26 July 1945
- Prime Minister: Winston Churchill
- Preceded by: Ernest Brown
- Succeeded by: John Hynd

Parliamentary Secretary to the Ministry of War Transport
- In office 29 June 1941 – 23 May 1945
- Prime Minister: Winston Churchill
- Preceded by: John Llewellin
- Succeeded by: Peter Thorneycroft

Parliamentary Secretary to the Ministry of Shipping
- In office 13 November 1939 – 29 June 1941
- Prime Minister: Neville Chamberlain; Winston Churchill
- Preceded by: Leslie Wilson (1919)
- Succeeded by: Office abolished

Member of the House of Lords Lord Temporal
- In office 12 November 1953 – 27 June 1975; Hereditary peerage

Member of Parliament for Ormskirk
- In office 5 April 1951 – 12 November 1953
- Preceded by: Ronald Cross
- Succeeded by: Douglas Glover

Member of Parliament for Oxford University
- In office 27 February 1937 – 23 February 1950
- Preceded by: Hugh Cecil
- Succeeded by: Constituency abolished

Personal details
- Born: James Arthur Salter; 15 March 1881
- Died: 27 June 1975 (aged 94)
- Education: Brasenose College, Oxford

James Arthur Salter, 1st Baron Salter, (15 March 1881 – 27 June 1975) was a British civil servant, politician, and academic who was a significant politician behind the concept of European political union, often in conjunction with his close friend and colleague Jean Monnet.

== Background and education ==
Salter was the eldest son of James Edward Salter (1857–1937) of the Thames boating company Salters Steamers, and who became Mayor of Oxford in 1909. Educated at Oxford City High School and Brasenose College, Oxford, where he was a scholar, he graduated with first class honours in Literae Humaniores in 1903.

== Career ==
Salter joined the Civil Service in 1904 and worked in the transport department of the Admiralty, on national insurance, and as private secretary, being promoted to Assistant Secretary grade in 1913. On the outbreak of war, he was recalled to the Admiralty, and became director of ship requisitioning. He was sent to Washington D.C. to press for a US programme of new construction.

In 1917–18 he was a colleague of Jean Monnet in the Chartering Committee of the Allied Maritime Transport Council, and in 1919 appointed secretary of the Supreme Economic Council in Paris. In 1920 he was appointed the first Secretary General to the Reparation Commission established by the Treaty of Versailles, a position he held from 1920 to 1922. Salter then joined Monnet at the League of Nations Secretariat in Geneva, as head of the Economic and Financial Section, where he was involved in the stabilization of currencies of Austria and Hungary and resettlement of refugees in Greece and Bulgaria.

He returned to London in 1930, and worked as journalist and author. In 1932, he presided over a Conference on Road and Rail Transport tasked with looking at the true costs and benefits of transport, and whose results were known as the Salter Report. It recommended changes to the way that public roads were funded to account for the growing demands of the motor car and road freight, and to ensure that road and rail were evenly regulated and competed fairly.

Salter was part of the World Conference for International Peace through Religion, which produced a report in 1932 on the causes of war.

In 1933, he had published the book The United States of Europe in which he included an essay first published on 2 September 1929, entitled "The 'United States of Europe' Idea", in which he set out the arguments for a Europe-wide Zollverein, stating that this could only be achieved "under the conditions of an overwhelmingly political motive and an extremely close political association between the countries concerned".

In his book, he also set out a template remarkably similar to that adopted by his former colleague Jean Monnet for the structure of the European Economic Community (EEC) in 1957. To that extent, Salter is regarded by some as co-author, with Jean Monnet, of the supranational structure of what became the European Union.

In 1934, he was appointed Gladstone professor of political theory and institutions at Oxford University, and a fellow of All Souls College, Oxford. He was Independent Member of Parliament (MP) for Oxford University from 1937 to 1950.

On outbreak of war in 1939, he resumed his role in shipping, being appointed Parliamentary Secretary to the Ministry of Shipping.

In June 1940, he once more supported Jean Monnet on the short-lived Franco-British Union proposal to politically unify Britain and France as a bastion against Nazism. Later, Salter headed the British shipping mission to Washington from 1941 to 1943, where he employed Monnet and they worked together on what would become the Victory Program of military industrial buildup.

He was appointed a Privy Councillor in 1941. In 1944 he was appointed deputy director-general of the United Nations Relief and Rehabilitation Administration. He served as Chancellor of the Duchy of Lancaster in the short-lived Churchill caretaker ministry (May–July 1945).

He was elected as Conservative MP for Ormskirk in 1951. Churchill offered him a new economic department in the Conservative Government formed that November, but he decided to join the Treasury provided he had access to the Cabinet. He served as Minister of State for Economic Affairs at the Treasury, and as Minister of Materials in 1952. Rab Butler, the Chancellor of the Exchequer, claimed in his 1971 memoirs that Churchill called Salter "the greatest economist since Jesus Christ" and drily recorded that “for thirteen months Salter wrote me numberless minutes in green ink with which I did not always agree”. Butler's biographer Anthony Howard writes that Salter was "never more than a minor, and sometimes visible, irritant to the new Chancellor". Butler called him "Micawber Salter" because of his opposition to Butler's proposal to let the pound float ("Operation ROBOT"). However, Edmund Dell wrote that Salter was "not the figure of fun of Butler’s memoirs".

In the mid-1950s he was invited by Nuri al-Said to be one of the external members of the Iraqi government's Development Board; while working with this board, he produced what came to be known as the "Salter Report" on industrial development of the Iraqi economy. He was raised to the peerage as Baron Salter, of Kidlington in the County of Oxford, on 16 October 1953. He had received many honours during his career, being first appointed a Companion of the Bath in 1918, a Knight Commander of the Bath in 1922, and a GBE in 1944. His peerage became extinct when he died in 1975, aged 94.

== Bibliography ==
- Sir Arthur Salter, Toward a Planned Economy. John Day 1934.

== Sources ==
- List of Ministers

Parliament of the United Kingdom
Preceded by Lord Hugh Cecil; A. P. Herbert	Member of Parliament for Oxford University; 1937 – 1950; With: A. P. Herbert	University constituencies abolished
Preceded by Ronald Cross	Member of Parliament for Ormskirk; 1951 – 1953	Succeeded by Douglas Glover
Political offices
Preceded by Ernest Brown	Chancellor of the Duchy of Lancaster; May–July 1945	Succeeded by John Hynd
Vacant Title last held by Hugh Gaitskell	Minister for Economic Affairs; 1951–1952	Office abolished
Peerage of the United Kingdom
New creation	Baron Salter; 1953–1975	Extinct
