= Francis Blundell (MP for Ormskirk) =

British politician (1880–1936)

Captain Francis Blundell
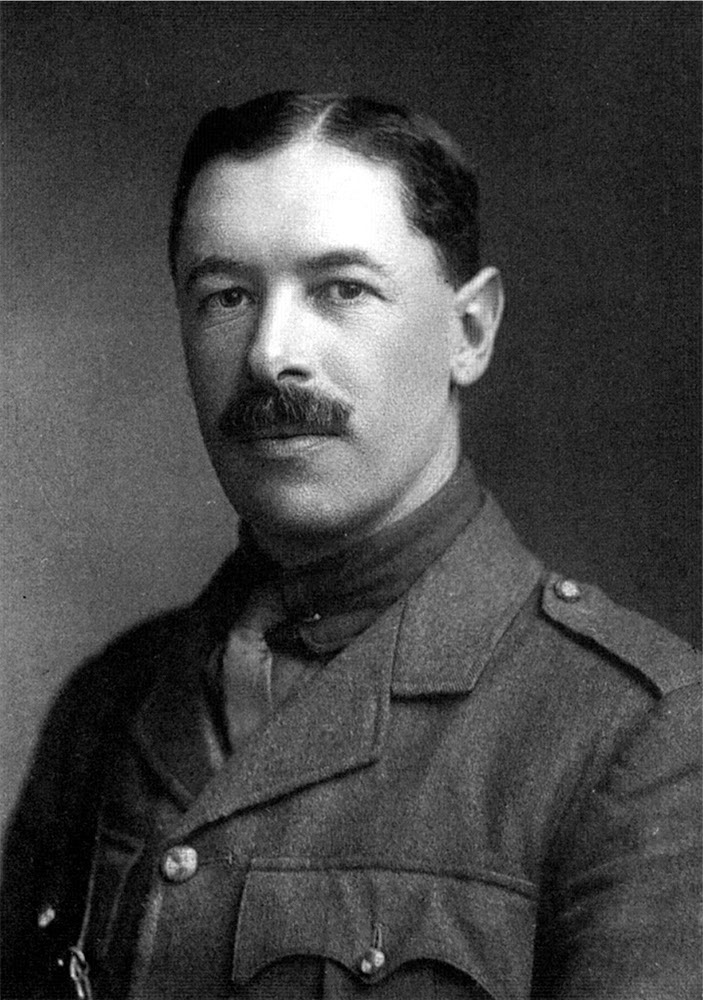
- Capt. Francis Blundell in 1915

Member of Parliament for Ormskirk
- In office 15 November 1922 – May 1929
- Preceded by: James Bell
- Succeeded by: Sir Samuel Rosbotham

Personal details
- Born: Francis Nicholas Blundell; 16 October 1880 Little Crosby, Lancashire
- Died: 28 October 1936 (aged 56) Kensington, London
- Party: Conservative
- Awards: Légion d'honneur Knight of Malta

Military service
- Allegiance: United Kingdom
- Branch/service: British Army
- Years of service: 1914–1919
- Rank: Captain
- Unit: Lancashire Hussars

Francis Nicholas Blundell (16 October 1880 – 28 October 1936) was a British Army officer, landowner and Conservative politician.

== Early life and career ==
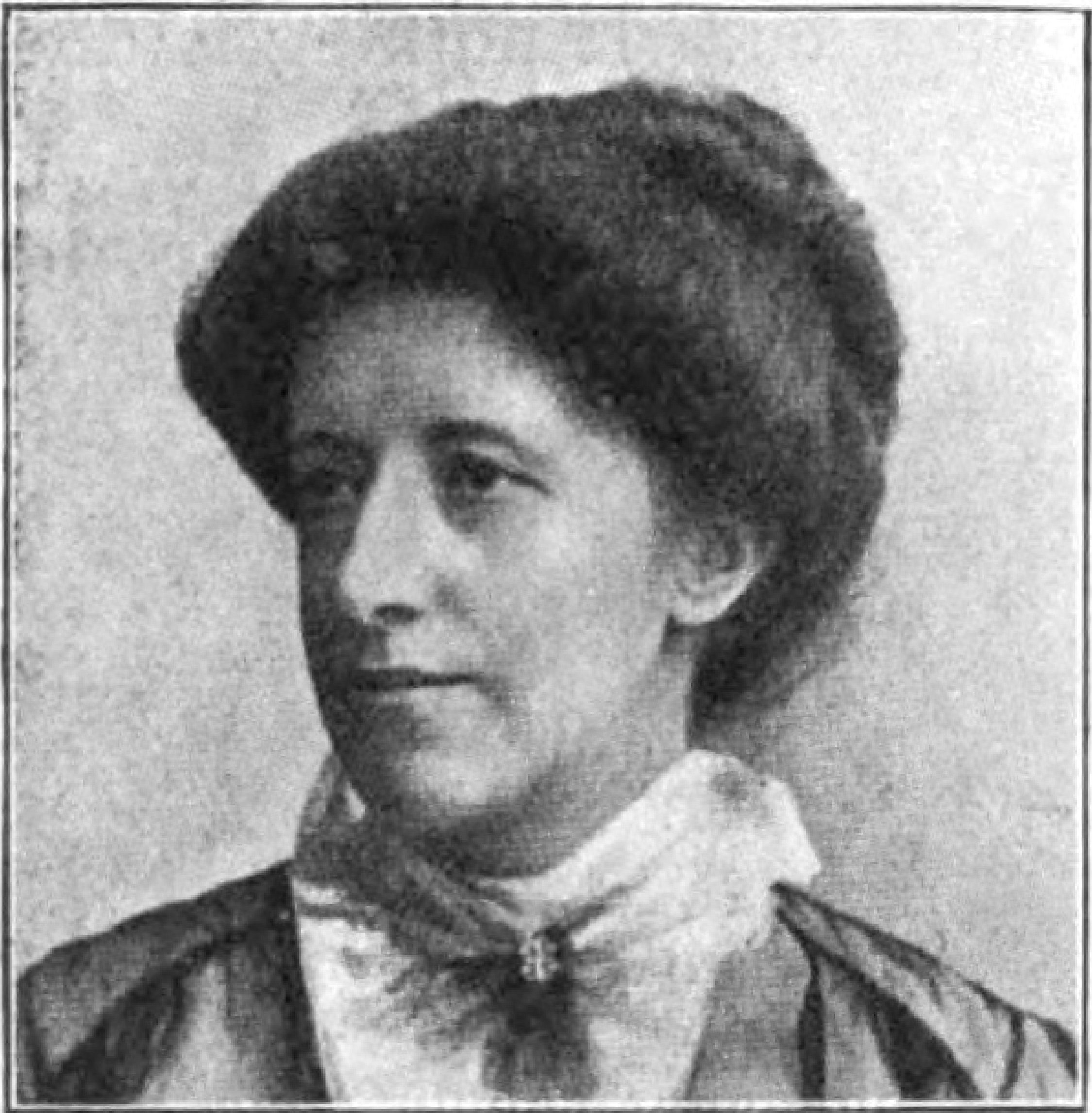
M. E. Francis (Mrs Francis Blundell)

Born at Crosby, his father Colonel Francis Nicholas Blundell (1853–1884) was a scion of the prominent Lancashire Roman Catholic land-owning family. His mother, Mary née Sweetman, of Killiney, County Dublin was an author who wrote a number of novels about country life under the pen name of M. E. Francis.

Blundell was educated at Stonyhurst College and the Oratory School, Birmingham, before going up to Merton College, Oxford (graduating BA in 1904).

=== Landowner and farmer ===
On the death of his uncle William Joseph Blundell (1851–1909), he inherited the Crosby Hall Estate. He thus became the owner of large landholdings, and involved himself in developing agriculture in the region. In 1912 he helped found the Lancashire Federation of Rural Friendly Societies enabling farm workers to take advantage of the National Insurance Act 1911. A member of the Lancashire Farmers Association (elected President, 1920), Blundell served as county representative on the National Farmers Union.

Commissioned into the Lancashire Hussars Yeomanry, Blundell served during First World War being promoted Captain and mentioned in despatches. He was later appointed a Justice of the Peace and Deputy Lieutenant for Lancashire.

In 1918 he married Theresa Ward (1891–1979), daughter of Wilfrid Ward, editor of the Dublin Review. The couple had two surviving children, Nicholas Blundell (1925–1949) and Hester Whitlock-Blundell (1928–2000).

== Politics ==
Entering politics in 1913 upon his election to Lancashire County Council, he served as County Alderman (1931–35) before retiring as a County Councillor, being succeeded by William Blundell. In 1922 he was selected as the Conservative PPC for Ormskirk. The seat, previously held by the Conservatives since its creation in 1885, had been unexpectedly lost to James Bell of the Labour Party in 1918. Blundell successfully regained the seat for the Conservatives, and held it at the 1923 and 1924 general elections. He lost Ormskirk at the 1929 general election to Labour's Sir Samuel Rosbotham, also a major Lancashire landowner and farmer.

== Papal honours ==
An active Catholic, Blundell was regarded as one of the most influential laymen in the country. He put forward the Roman Catholic Relief Act 1926 and served as Chairman of the Catholic Education Council of England and Wales from 1927 until his death.

Papal Chamberlain of the Sword and Cape to three Popes: Pius X, Benedict XV and Pius XI, Blundell was a Knight of Malta, having in 1919 been appointed a Chevalier of the Légion d'honneur.

== After Parliament ==
Blundell arms

Blundell was recognised as an authority on agriculture, and served on a number of HMG bodies dealing with the matter. He was appointed to the Imperial Economic Committee in 1926, to the Milk Reorganisation Commission in 1932, and to the Eggs and Poultry Reorganisation Commission in 1933. He wrote two books on agriculture: The Agricultural Problem (1928) and A New Policy for Agriculture (1931). In 1935 he presented Sniggery Wood to the town of Crosby marking the Silver Jubilee of George V. In 1936 a charter of incorporation was granted, constituting Crosby as a municipal borough in the following year, and Blundell was elected as the first Mayor of Crosby.

=== Death ===
Blundell died suddenly from heart failure at a hotel in Kensington, London on 28 October 1936, aged 56. He was buried in the graveyard of St Mary's Catholic Church, Little Crosby.

Parliament of the United Kingdom
Preceded by James Bell	Member of Parliament for Ormskirk; 1922 – 1929	Succeeded by Sir Samuel Rosbotham
