= 1951 Ormskirk by-election =

UK Parliamentary by-election

- 5 April 1951

Constituency of Ormskirk
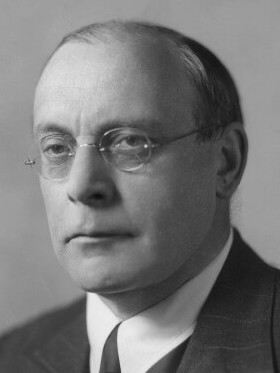
	First party	Second party
		Lab
Candidate	Arthur Salter	H. A. Kelly
Party	Conservative	Labour
Popular vote	24,190	8,969
Percentage	71.47%	26.50%
Swing	▲5.20%	▼7.23%
MP before election
Ronald Cross
Conservative
Elected MP
Arthur Salter
Conservative

The 1951 Ormskirk by-election of 5 April 1951 was held after the appointment of Conservative MP Ronald Cross as Governor of Tasmania.

The seat was safe, having been won at the 1950 United Kingdom general election by over 14,000 votes The Conservative Party held the seat.

== Result of the previous general election ==
General election 1950: Ormskirk
Party	Candidate	Votes	%	±%
Conservative	Ronald Cross	28,654	66.27	
Labour	L.C. Edwards	14,853	33.73	
Majority		14,071	32.54	
Turnout		43,237	83.9	
Conservative win (new seat)				

== Result of the by-election ==
By-election 1951: Ormskirk
Party	Candidate	Votes	%	±%
Conservative	Arthur Salter	24,190	71.47	+5.20
Labour	H. A. Kelly	8,969	26.50	−7.23
Ind. Labour Party	Fred Barton	689	2.04	New
Majority		15,221	44.97	+21.12
Turnout		33,848		
Conservative hold		Swing		
