= National Labour Organisation =

- Abbreviation: NLO
- Leader: Ramsay MacDonald; Malcolm MacDonald
- Founded: 1931; 95 years ago
- Dissolved: 14 June 1945; 81 years ago
- Split from: Labour Party
- Headquarters: London, England
- Newspaper: News-Letter
- Ideology: Social democracy
- Political position: Centre-left
- Colours: Green

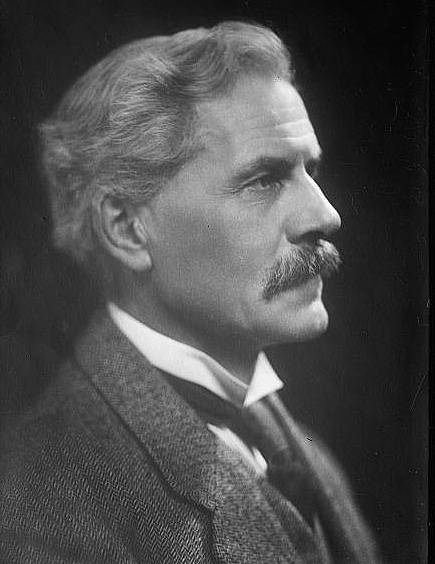
Ramsay MacDonald, c.1920

The National Labour Organisation, also known simply as National Labour, was formed in 1931 by supporters of the National Government in Britain who had been expelled from the Labour Party. Its leaders were Ramsay MacDonald (1931–1937) and his son Malcolm MacDonald (1937–1945).

The most prominent member was the Prime Minister Ramsay MacDonald. National Labour sponsored parliamentary candidates, but did not consider itself a political party as it had no policy distinctive from that of the government which it supported.

After Ramsay MacDonald's death, the group continued in existence under his son Malcolm until it was wound up on the eve of the 1945 general election; its newsletter ceased publication two years later.

== History ==
=== 1931 general election ===
After Prime Minister Ramsay MacDonald formed a National Government with the Conservative and Liberal parties to implement spending cuts rejected by the Labour Party, he and his supporters were expelled from the party. He also received no support from any of the Constituency Labour Parties or major trade unions affiliated with the Trades Union Congress.

The sudden decision to call a general election in October 1931 left MacDonald and the other Labour supporters with the difficult job of organising their own re-elections without any form of organisation. Preparations had been started on 19 September and by early October National Labour supporters had a list of 34 seats which they wanted to fight: 14 out of 15 sitting National Labour MPs wished to fight for re-election and a further ten candidates were ready to stand in other seats. The group thought that a further ten candidates could easily be found.

==== Finance and organisation ====
MacDonald was adamant that National Labour should be separate and not connected to Conservative Central Office. An offer of £100,000 funding from Lord Beaverbrook seems to have been declined, but Sir Alexander Grant gave £250 and the Duke of Westminster gave £2,000 through Maundy Gregory. National Labour had collected £20,000 in total for election expenses. At the start of the election, MacDonald denied Labour Party claims that the funds had come from the Conservative Party. Frank Markham (MacDonald's Parliamentary Private Secretary) and the junior minister Earl De La Warr set up a National Labour Committee to run the election. De La Warr became chairman.

==== Candidates ====
Negotiations with Conservative Central Office began after a meeting on 25 September, when the Conservatives had reassured MacDonald that it would not be difficult to come to agreement. Frank Markham then drafted a list of 35 constituencies in which National Labour wanted to stand for election and wanted the Conservatives to support them. However, the Conservatives objected to many of the entries such as Kensington North and Birmingham Erdington, which were marginal former Conservative seats that had only narrowly gone to Labour in 1929. Local Conservatives refused to withdraw their candidates, and in Liverpool Everton, sitting National Labour MP Derwent Hall Caine found himself opposed (and eventually beaten) by a Conservative. By 14 October, with the close of nominations imminent, persistent Conservative associations and candidates had forced National Labour candidates to withdraw in four constituencies and there were only 25 candidates confirmed, 10 of whom had Conservative opposition.

MacDonald himself tried to intervene and on the day after the election was announced complained that Attorney-General Sir William Jowitt had been forced out of Preston and the Conservatives could not find a local association willing to accept him. Jowitt subsequently stood and lost as a National Labour candidate for Combined English Universities. He later rejoined the Labour Party and would end up in Clement Attlee's 1945–1951 government as Lord Chancellor.

Conservative Party chairman Lord Stonehaven complained back to MacDonald about his promotion of "unknown candidates introduced at the very last moment by yourself" competing against Conservatives who had promised him their support, which risked handing the seats to the opposition.

Of the 20 candidates actually nominated, six faced a rival Conservative candidate and one a rival Liberal National. Three more candidates withdrew before polling day. The general organisation of National Labour during the election was run by Benjamin Musgrave. In the 1931 United Kingdom general election 13 were returned as National Labour MPs.

=== Creation of the organisation ===
In December, MacDonald's private secretary Herbert Usher wrote a long memorandum asking key questions about what type of ongoing organisation was needed. Usher stated that MacDonald needed to answer three crucial questions: first, whether he wanted to form a new party; second, whether he envisaged returning to the Labour Party; and third, whether the National Government would continue for a long time and produce a single party of the centre. Usher argued that it was not possible to create a distinctive National Labour Party because any distinctive policy would threaten the unity of the National Government coalition. He also contended that MacDonald could not return to the Labour Party, which harboured extreme bitterness about the manner in which the National Government was formed. Usher concluded that the public favoured a large centrist party, but that existing political organisations would not permit it.

Early in 1932 a constitution and organisation was established and the monthly News-Letter set up for supporters which was edited by Clifford Allen. An editorial in the first edition written by Allen emphasised that the News-Letter was "intended to be a means of contact between Labour supporters of the National Government", but also "begs the attention of public opinion", The editorship was later taken by Godfrey Elton and both Allen and Elton received peerages from MacDonald. In September 1932, William Spofforth (formerly the Labour Party agent in Westhoughton) was appointed as secretary.

Philip Snowden, who as Chancellor of the Exchequer had been second only to MacDonald in becoming a prominent Labour member of the National Government, remained nominally one of the National Labour cabinet members after the election, having received a Peerage. However, Snowden rejected an invitation from Clifford Allen to write for the News-Letter, replying scathingly and declaring that "I really do not understand this National Labour Party". When Snowden resigned from the government in opposition to the protectionist outcome of the Ottawa Conference in September 1932, he declared that he no longer had any party allegiance.

=== Relations with the Conservatives ===
After the election, MacDonald persisted in trying to find a seat for Jowitt. All that Stonehaven would offer was Nottingham South, where the Conservative Association might be persuaded to support Jowitt if the sitting National Labour member George Wilfrid Holford Knight stood down. Unexpectedly, Holford Knight refused to comply and MacDonald was angry not with him, but the Conservatives for not offering a seat that they held. In July 1932, a by-election arose in Wednesbury, a seat that Labour had held at every election except 1931. De La Warr expressed to Stonehaven the hope that the local Conservatives would accept a National Labour candidate, but Stonehaven wrote back that the suggestion amazed him. He had tried, but the Wednesbury Conservative Association were obdurate in refusing to have a National Labour candidate, which would mean handing over their organisation and funding the campaign. MacDonald may have considered resigning, but he decided only to refuse to send a message of support to the Conservative, who ended up losing the seat to Labour anyway.

In its publicity, National Labour was concerned to stress that although Parliament was heavily dominated by the Conservatives, the cabinet was much more evenly balanced between the parties.

In 1933, a local electoral pact was agreed in Finsbury between National Labour and the Municipal Reform Party in advance of the 1934 London County Council election. The Parliamentary constituency had a National Labour MP, but the two London County Council seats were held by Labour and the pact agreed that Kenneth Lindsay would run in conjunction with one Municipal Reform candidate in the election. In the event, Michael Franklin of National Labour and Fordham Flower of Municipal Reform stood as National Municipal candidates, but they failed to win seats.

=== Policy and publicity ===
While National Labour could not advocate any policy in opposition to the National Government, its members gave policy suggestions and argued in support of government policy. A pamphlet, called "On the Home Front" and published in April 1934, outlined the National Labour argument in support of the National Government's domestic policy—it argued that the agricultural policy followed by the government had "the characteristic Conservative policy of a tariff" as well as "the characteristic Socialist State organisation of industry" and therefore showed what the government "owes to the traditional doctrines of not one, but all, Parties in the State". The pamphlet asserted that returning to the old party system would mean weak government and that it was weak government that had led other European countries to dictatorship.

Looking back on the politics of the 1930s in a 1964 article, Professor Arthur Marwick regarded National Labour's significance as being "a central point around which people who desired political agreement could cohere". He noted that National Labour could attract to collectivist socialism some who were put off by the resolutely working-class character of the Labour Party and cited Harold Nicolson as a case in point.

In April 1935, a volume of essays by five leading National Labour politicians was published under the title "Towards a National Policy: being a National Labour Contribution". MacDonald contributed a preface in which he argued that the Labour opposition "is as little guided by Socialist opinion and inspired by the fine human spirit of our British Socialism as any other political party of pure expediency striving for a majority". Lord Elton argued that trade unions should not affiliate to the Labour Party because they could achieve more by bargaining for support when not tied to one political party.

=== 1935 general election ===
MacDonald remained Prime Minister as the head of a coalition government until June 1935, when he gave way to Stanley Baldwin and became instead Lord President of the Council. At the 1935 general election, the party sponsored 20 candidates, eight of whom were elected. A notable new recruit was Harold Nicolson, a former diplomat and an ex-political associate of Oswald Mosley when he created the New Party. Immediately after the election, the News-Letter argued that Labour supporters of the National Government were hidden "thanks to the trade union 'terror'" and that the party ought to appeal for the votes of all socialists and trade unionists opposed to being herded into the political wilderness. When Ramsay MacDonald's son, Malcolm, fought the Ross and Cromarty by-election of 1936, he found himself opposed by Randolph Churchill standing as a Conservative and arguing that 'National Labour' was a "sham device" with no real support. After learning of his son's success, Ramsay MacDonald corrected a correspondent who had referred to "Labour's defeat" by asserting, "Labour was victorious, and a queer mixture which had neither principle nor political policy, now known as Opposition Labour, was defeated".

=== Later years ===
On 18 October 1937, Ramsay MacDonald officially opened the new headquarters of the National Labour Organisation at 57 Tufton Street. A month later, MacDonald was dead; the National Labour Organisation continued, although it postponed its conference until March 1938. When the conference happened, The Times greeted it with a leader commending the party for striking "deeper roots than a group formed around a particular personality". Malcolm MacDonald took the leadership of the group in Parliament and National Labour members retained office—the party issued a declaration of support for Neville Chamberlain over the Munich Agreement.

In the first edition of the News-Letter for 1939, a declaration from National Labour was printed and it pledged support for a united British Empire, a strong League of Nations ("for bringing about constructive schemes of world appeasement, economic as well as political"), the national planning of our economic life, preservation of the countryside and the improvement of social services. When Germany invaded the whole of Czechoslovakia in March 1939, an editorial called for "a Government of national concentration" which would have to include "the trusted leaders of the trade unions and the Opposition parties". A Parliamentary motion from Anthony Eden and Winston Churchill calling for a National government "on the widest possible basis" was given support from the News-Letter in the following issue.

In the run-up to an expected general election in autumn 1939, several National Labour candidates were adopted and the party attracted some high-profile figures to defect to it (including former MP Michael Marcus). The outbreak of war, delaying the election, forced the group to reconsider. In February 1940, it was announced that the party would not be holding an annual conference that year and had suspended publication of "News Letter". When Churchill formed his war ministry National Labour leader Malcolm Macdonald retained his cabinet seat but his colleague Earl De La Warr was dropped. In contrast, Harold Nicolson became Parliamentary Secretary to the Ministry of Information. Macdonald left the government in February 1941 to become High Commissioner to Canada but retained his parliamentary seat. Nicolson - now the only National Labour politician in government - lasted until July 1941 when he was replaced by a Labour Party nominee.

In February 1942, Stephen King-Hall resigned from the Parliamentary Party, stating that he wanted to oppose the involvement of party political considerations in wartime. In May 1943, he was followed by Kenneth Lindsay reducing the Parliamentary group to only five in number. Earl De La Warr resigned in August 1943, succeeded as chairman by Richard Denman.

=== Dissolution ===
Despite remaining full supporters of Winston Churchil's new 'National Government', National Labour were not offered any government offices. A special conference of the National Labour Organisation on 14 June 1945 decided to dissolve the party. Malcolm Macdonald chose not to defend his seat and retired from front-line politics though was later appointed as High Commissioner to India and Governor of Kenya. The other former National Labour MPs adopted were redesignated to run as National Parliamentary candidates. The organisation issued a closing statement that praised the Labour Party for joining the Coalition in 1940 and condemned it for breaking up the Coalition immediately after victory in Europe. It called "all men and women of progressive outlook" to vote to re-elect the Churchill government. In recording the dissolution, the "Election Diary" in The Observer considered the surprising thing to be that it took place in a year as late as 1945.

The five remaining National Labour MPs were rebadged as National candidates and were defeated in the subsequent 1945 General Election. Former National Labour MP Kenneth Lindsay was re-elected as an independent after moving constituencies from Kilmarnock to Combined English Universities. The News-Letter continued, with an editorial line critical of the post-war Labour government. In September 1946, it urged progressive members of the Conservative Party to discard their name and join with the Liberal Party under another name; the editorial believed "the struggle for the future will be for individual rights against the omnipotent State, democracy against despotism". The last edition of the News-Letter was dated April–July 1947.

Subsequently, Harold Nicolson joined the Labour Party and stood as its candidate in the 1948 Croydon North by-election, which he lost. Sir Frank Markham joined the Conservatives and returned to the House of Commons as the MP for Buckingham at the 1951 general election. Markham retired from parliament in 1964. Leslie Thomas (the son of Jimmy Thomas) had stood as a National Labour candidate in Leek in the 1935 general election. In 1953, he was elected as a Conservative Party candidate for Canterbury in a by-election until he stood down in 1966.

The only former National Labour politician to return to government besides Jowitt was Earl De La Warr in 1951. He was appointed by Prime Minister Winston Churchill as Postmaster General. It was a ministerial appointment but outside the Cabinet. De La Warr retired in 1955.

== Candidacies ==
The candidates sponsored by the National Labour Committee and the subsequent National Labour Organisation were as follows.

- Legend
1. Those listed in bold were successful in at least one election.
2. Colour key:

Seat gained Seat held (seat held by sitting MP in 1931)

Constituency	Candidate	1931		By-elections			1935		By-elections		
Constituency	Candidate	Votes	%	Date	Votes	%	Votes	%	Date	Votes	%
Bassetlaw	**Malcolm MacDonald**	27,136	66.6	—			20,764	48.7	Elected for Ross and Cromarty		
Bristol East	Archibald George Church	—		—			15,126	40.7	Contested Derby		
Cardiff Central	**Ernest Nathaniel Bennett**	24,120	69.2	—			16,954	51.6	—		
Colne Valley	Michael Arthur Ernest Franklin	202	0.5	—			—		—		
Combined English Universities	William Allen Jowitt	2,759	20.1	—			—		—		
Combined Scottish Universities	**Ramsay MacDonald**	—		—			—		27–31 January 1936	16,393	56.5
Derby	**James Henry Thomas**	49,257	36.4	—			37,566	30.1	—		
Derby	Archibald George Church	—		—			—		9 July 1936	25,666	47.5
Dewsbury	John Fennell	—		—			8,798	29.5	—		
Essex South East	Felix Greene	6,539	11.5	—			—		—		
Finsbury	**George Masterman Gillett**	17,292	63.1	—			10,600	44.2	—		
Forest of Dean	**John Vigers Worthington**	14,815	52.7	—			12,337	42.4	—		
Gateshead	John Fennell	187	0.3	—			—		—		
Ilkeston	**Abraham John Flint**	17,587	50.0	—			—		—		
Kilmarnock	**Craigie Mason Aitchison**	21,803	59.6	—			—		—		
Kilmarnock	**Kenneth Martin Lindsay**	—		2 November 1933	12,577	34.8	19,115	50.9	—		
Lambeth North	Frank Markham	—		23 October 1934	2,927	15.0	—		—		
Leeds Central	**Richard Denman**	26,496	71.4	—			17,747	56.4	—		
Leek	Leslie Thomas	—		—			17,419	42.6	—		
Leicester West	**Harold Nicolson**	—		—			15,821	43.7	—		
Lichfield	**James Lovat-Fraser**	26,669	62.8	—			23,489	53.8	—		
Lichfield	George Beresford Craddock	—		—			—		5 May 1938	22,760	48.8
Liverpool Everton	Derwent Hall Caine	4,950	19.9	—			—		—		
Middlesbrough West	William Arthur Spofforth	—		—			11,387	30.1	—		
Newcastle upon Tyne Central	William Henry Dashwood Caple	94	0.3	—			—		—		
Nottingham South	**George Wilfred Holford Knight**	22,852	68.3	—			—		—		
Nottingham South	**Frank Markham**	—		—			15,559	52.3	—		
Ormskirk	**Sam Tom Rosbotham**	30,368	75.0	—			27,624	58.5	—		
Ormskirk	**Stephen King-Hall**	—		—			—		27 October 1939	Unopposed	
Peckham	Ernest James Titler	1,442	4.3	—			—		—		
Ross and Cromarty	**Malcolm MacDonald**	—		—			—		10 February 1936	8,949	49.5
Seaham	**Ramsay MacDonald**	28,978	55.0	—			17,882	31.8	Elected for Combined Scottish University		
Southwark Central	Ernest Stanford	—		—			9,735	46.7	—		
South Shields	Frederick Burden	—		—			10,784	23.6	—		
Tottenham South	**Francis Noel Palmer**	17,824	58.6	—			15,834	41.5	—		
Wednesbury	Herbert Dunnico	—		—			19,883	46.7	—		

== See also ==
- List of National Labour MPs
- Category:National Labour (UK) politicians
- List of Labour Party breakaway parties (UK)
