= Off the Record (play) =

British comedy play

- Written by: Ian Hay; Stephen King-Hall
- Original language: English
- Genre: Comedy

Premiere
- Date premiered: 17 March 1947
- Place premiered: King's Theatre, Edinburgh

Off the Record is a 1947 British comedy play by Ian Hay and Stephen King-Hall. It is a farce about the Royal Navy.

It premiered at the King's Theatre, Edinburgh prior to its London run. In the West End it ran for 702 performances from 3 June 1947 to 12 February 1949, initially at the Apollo Theatre before transferring to the Piccadilly Theatre. The cast included Hugh Wakefield, Hubert Gregg, Roger Maxwell, and Tom Gill.

In 1957 it was adapted into the British comedy film Carry on Admiral

== Bibliography ==
- Wearing, J.P. The London Stage 1940-1949: A Calendar of Productions, Performers, and Personnel. Rowman & Littlefield, 2014.
