= A Safe Proposition =

1932 film

- Feature on the film in Boy's Cinema magazine (24 September 1932)
- Directed by: Leslie S. Hiscott
- Written by: Michael Barringer
- Produced by: Julius Hagen
- Starring: A. W. Baskcomb
- Production company: Real Art Productions
- Distributed by: Fox Film
- Release date: 1932
- Running time: 45 minutes
- Country: United Kingdom
- Language: English

A Safe Proposition (also known as Night Work) is a 1932 British comedy film directed by Leslie S. Hiscott and starring A. W. Baskcomb, Barbara Gott, Harold French and Austin Trevor. It was written by Michael Barringer and made at Twickenham Studios as a quota quickie for release by Fox Film.

== Preservation status ==
The British Film Institute National Archive holds no stills or ephemera, and no film or video materials.

== Plot ==
To cover her bridge gambling debts, Emily Woodford sells an expensive necklace given to her by her husband Henry and replaces it with a convincing imitation. To hide the swap, she convinces Reggie Holloway who is courting her daughter Margaret, to stage a robbery and steal the replica from a safe. But unknown to her, Henry has already discovered her plan and has replaced the fake with the original necklace. During the robbery, Reggie encounters burglar Ginger Newton. Believing the jewelry is merely the worthless fake, Reggie helps Ginger escape with the genuine necklace.

== Cast ==
- A. W. Baskcomb as Henry Woodford
- Barbara Gott as Emily Woodford
- Harold French as Reggie Holloway
- Joyce Kirby as Margaret Woodford
- Austin Trevor as Count Tonelli
- Alexander Field as Ginger Newton
- Molly Fisher as Mrs. Newton
- Henry B. Longhurst as Sergeant Crouch

== Reception ==
Kine Weekly wrote: "An amusing little crook comedy, enlivened by the performances of the stars as nouveaux riches. Of average merit in every way, it should prove an acceptable second feature in the general programme. ... A. V. Baskcomb gives a very finished performance as the husband, Barbara Gott being also most effective as the agitated and homely wife. Younger members of the cast are not so successful in their portrayals, though they work hard to give good support. Leslie Hiscott, though rather inclined to let his characters talk too much, easily handles his plot."

The Daily Film Renter wrote: "Well-knit story packed with neat situations and abundance of comedy dialogue. ... Excellent photography and settings, and interesting performance of A. V. Baskcomb. ... Acted in just the right spirit by a capable cast, this picture moves well and contains, a number of piquant situations."
