= Leave It to Psmith (play) =

1930 play by Ian Hay and P. G. Wodehouse

- Written by: Ian Hay; P. G. Wodehouse
- Original language: English
- Genre: Comedy

Premiere
- Date premiered: 29 September 1930
- Place premiered: Shaftesbury Theatre

Leave it to Psmith, subtitled "A comedy of youth, love and misadventure", is a 1930 comedy play by Ian Hay and P. G. Wodehouse, based on the latter's 1923 novel of the same title. It premiered in London's West End at the Shaftesbury Theatre on 29 September 1930.

In the play, Freddie Bosham, son of the Earl of Middlewick, wants to marry Phyllis Jackson, but needs to raise money to be able to marry her. He hires Psmith, who is ready to do any job, to come to the family's country house and steal his stepmother's diamond necklace, but they find that others are after the necklace, too.

In 1933 the play was adapted into a film Leave It to Me directed by Monty Banks and starring Gene Gerrard, Olive Borden and Molly Lamont.

== Plot ==
=== Act One ===
The first scene is set in the Oak Gallery in Blandings Castle, in the morning. At the castle is the Earl of Middlewick, his butler Bellows, his youngest son Freddie, and his secretary Baxter. Freddie's stepmother, Lady Middlewick, has inherited a diamond necklace (to the chagrin of second cousin Ethelberta). Freddie and Phyllis Jackson want to get married but her father will not approve unless Freddie either works for his jam business or invests five thousand pounds in the business. Freddie prefers the latter. He has inherited five thousand pounds, but Lady Middlewick must sign any cheques drawn by Freddie against his legacy, and she disapproves of the investment. Freddie and Phyllis see an advertisement offering Psmith's services for any job whatsoever. Freddie wants to hire Psmith to steal the diamond necklace and arranges a meeting. Middlewick goes to London to hire Eve Halliday to catalogue the castle's library, and to bring poets Ralston McTodd and Aileen Peavey to Blandings at Lady Middlewick's command.

The second scene is set outside the Greek Park Tube Station. Cynthia, wife of Ralston McTodd, chats with a lift man and tells her friend Eve that Ralston, who is temperamental, has left her once again to go write poetry somewhere. It rains and Eve has no umbrella. Psmith takes Walderwick's umbrella from the nearby Morpheus Club and gives it to her. Psmith likes Eve and offers to steal the necklace for Freddie for free, to be near Eve at Blandings. Eddie Cootes also tries to trick Psmith out of money but fails. The third scene is set later in the Morpheus Club. Eve talks with club waitress Miss Rumbelow, sees Psmith again, and returns the umbrella. Psmith shows Walderwick where his lost umbrella is and Walderwick thanks him. Psmith tells Freddie his plan: they will steal Lady Middlewick's necklace, then she will sign Freddie's cheque to buy her a new one, but he will actually return her stolen necklace to her. Lord Middlewick annoys McTodd, and McTodd leaves while Middlewick is out. When Middlewick returns, Psmith pretends to be McTodd, which Middlewick believes because he has lost his glasses. Middlewick tells Eve that Psmith is Ralston McTodd.

=== Act Two ===
The second act is set in the Oak Gallery in Blandings Castle, in the following evening. There is a gramophone playing, and Freddie, Phyllis, Waldwerick, and Agatha dance. Lord and Lady Middlewick, Ethelberta, Baxter, and Psmith enter, and everyone settles down to drink coffee. Lady Middlewick is wearing her diamond necklace and shows it off to Ethelberta. Lady Middlewick announces that Miss Peavey and Mr McTodd are going to read their poetry for them. Aileen Peavey enters and talks poetically about fairies. Lord Chipstead, Walderwick's father and Lady Middlewick's cousin, also joins the party. Miss Peavey and Psmith (as McTodd) sign their names in Baxter's autograph book. When Eve privately talks to Psmith about his treatment of his supposed wife Cynthia, Psmith improvises and convinces her that Cynthia is wrong about him.

Baxter shows Freddie and Phyllis that Psmith's signature is wrong. Baxter suspects Psmith is an imposter intent on stealing the necklace. Freddie and Phyllis discuss this with Psmith. Cootes appears again, pretending to be Ralston McTodd and hoping to steal the necklace, but Psmith stops him and lets him go. Cootes and Peavey recognize each other as they are both confidence tricksters and former partners. They realize Psmith is an imposter, and since Cootes has a gun, they get him to agree to introduce Cootes to the household. Psmith introduces Cootes to Bellows as his valet, and gets his gun by pretending Cootes was carrying it for him. Miss Peavey and Cootes plan to turn off the lights and take Lady Middlewick's necklace. They enact their plan and Cootes hides the necklace in a flower-pot. Eve takes it and hides it elsewhere, and then Psmith acquires it.

=== Act Three ===
The third act takes place the next morning, in a keeper's cottage at Blandings where Psmith is staying. Eve spoke on the telephone with Cynthia and realized that Psmith is not McTodd. She tells Freddie. Freddie tells her he already knows and had asked Psmith to steal the necklace. Lady Middlewick has signed Freddie's cheque, ostensibly for buying a new necklace. He gave the cheque to Phyllis to give to her father and now needs the stolen necklace. Eve thinks Psmith never intended to give it to Freddie. They look through Psmith's things for the necklace. Psmith appears and is disappointed in Freddie. He still has Cootes's revolver and locks Freddie behind a staircase door. He tells Eve that he agreed to steal the necklace for free, not to take the necklace himself but to be near Eve. She asks him to prove it by giving her Lady Middlewick's necklace and he complies.

Miss Peavey appears with Cootes, who is holding a revolver and also grabs the one Psmith took. They take the necklace and decide to get married. Psmith manages to take the guns when Cootes is distracted by Freddie shouting, and Cootes gives him the necklace. Miss Peavey and Cootes leave without the necklace but plan to marry anyway. After Mr and Mrs McTodd arrive, Baxter and Lord Middlewick question Psmith about his identity. Psmith claims he was invited by Freddie to help guard the necklace, which Freddie corroborates. Psmith tells them Miss Peavey was a thief and Freddie recovered the necklace. Lady Middlewick thanks Freddie. Baxter is suspicious of Psmith but is ignored and resigns. Lord Middlewick hires Psmith as his new secretary. Psmith and Eve plan to get married. He again takes Walderwick's umbrella and they walk out under the umbrella.

== Roles and original cast ==
The roles are listed in the script by order of appearance:

- The Earl of Middlewick – Clive Currie
- Bellows – Roger Maxwell
- Freddie Bosham – Reginald Gardiner
- Rupert Baxter – Edward Chapman
- Phyllis Jackson – Nonnie Taylor
- Lady Middlewick – Eileen Munro
- A Lift Man – Edward Chapman
- Cynthia McTodd – Thea Holme
- Eve Halliday – Jane Baxter
- Ronald Eustace Psmith – Basil Foster
- Eddie Cootes – Aubrey Mather
- Gladys Rumbelow – Joan Hickson
- Christopher Walderwick – John Charlton
- Ralston McTodd – Jack Lambert
- Agatha Crofton – Blanche Adele
- Ethelberta Fitzwiggin – Kathleen James
- Aileen Peavey – Olive Blakeney
- Viscount Chipstead – Arthur Vezin

== Productions ==
The play was first staged at the Kings Theatre, Southsea on 8 September 1930, and was first staged in London at the Golders Green Hippodrome on 15 September 1930. It then began a 146 performance run in the West End, initially at the Shaftesbury Theatre (29 September 1930 through 17 January 1931) before transferring to the Lyric (19 January through 31 January 1931). The cast included Jane Baxter and Basil Foster. Clive Currie, who performed in the play as the Earl of Middlewick (the play's version of the book character Lord Emsworth), also portrayed Lord Emsworth in the 1933 film adaptation, Leave It to Me.

== Publication history ==
The play was published by Samuel French, Inc. in 1932. It was also included in a collection of four plays by Wodehouse titled Four Plays, which was published by Methuen in 1983.
