= The Gusher =

- Original language: English
- Written by: Ian Hay
- Genre: Adventure

Premiere
- Date: 31 July 1937
- Place: Prince's Theatre, London

The Gusher is a 1937 mystery adventure play by the British writer Ian Hay. It is set during a gold rush.

It ran for a 137 performances at the Prince's Theatre in London's West End. The large cast included Alastair Sim, Coral Browne, Edward Sinclair, Percy Parsons, Bernard Lee, Jack Livesey and Joan Hickson, and the production featured a revolving stage.

== Bibliography ==
- Wearing, J.P. The London Stage 1930-1939: A Calendar of Productions, Performers, and Personnel. Rowman & Littlefield, 2014.
