= 1953 Ormskirk by-election =

UK parliamentary by-election

The 1953 Ormskirk by-election of 12 November 1953 was held after the elevation to the Peerage of Conservative MP Arthur Salter.

The seat was safe, having been won at the 1951 United Kingdom general election by almost 14,000 votes The seat was held by the Conservative Party.

== Result of the previous general election ==
General election 1951: Ormskirk
Party	Candidate	Votes	%	±%
Conservative	Arthur Salter	26,759	67.43	+1.16
Labour	Ernest Kavanagh	12,908	32.57	−1.16
Majority		13,821	34.87	+2.32
Turnout		39,667	78.68	
Conservative hold		Swing		

== Result of the by-election ==
By-election 1953: Ormskirk
Party	Candidate	Votes	%	±%
Conservative	Douglas Glover	17,984	65.41	−2.02
Labour	Muriel Ferguson	9,512	34.59	+2.02
Majority		8,472	30.76	−4.04
Turnout		27,496		
Conservative hold		Swing		
