= Good Luck (play) =

- Written by: Ian Hay; Seymour Hicks
- Original language: English
- Genre: Comedy

Premiere
- Date premiered: 27 September 1923
- Place premiered: Drury Lane Theatre, London

Good Luck is a 1923 comedy play by Ian Hay and Seymour Hicks.

It ran for 260 performances at the Drury Lane Theatre in London's West End between 27 September 1923 and 10 May 1924. The cast included Claude Rains, Edmund Gwenn, Arthur Treacher, Claud Allister, Joan Maude and Joyce Carey.

In 1926 it was adapted into a silent film The Sporting Lover by Hollywood studio First National Pictures, starring Conway Tearle and Barbara Bedford.

== Bibliography ==
- Goble, Alan. The Complete Index to Literary Sources in Film. Walter de Gruyter, 1999.
- Wearing, J. P. The London Stage 1920-1929: A Calendar of Productions, Performers, and Personnel. Rowman & Littlefield, 2014.
