= Arthur Stanley (politician) =

British politician

The Honourable Sir Arthur Stanley GCVO GBE CB
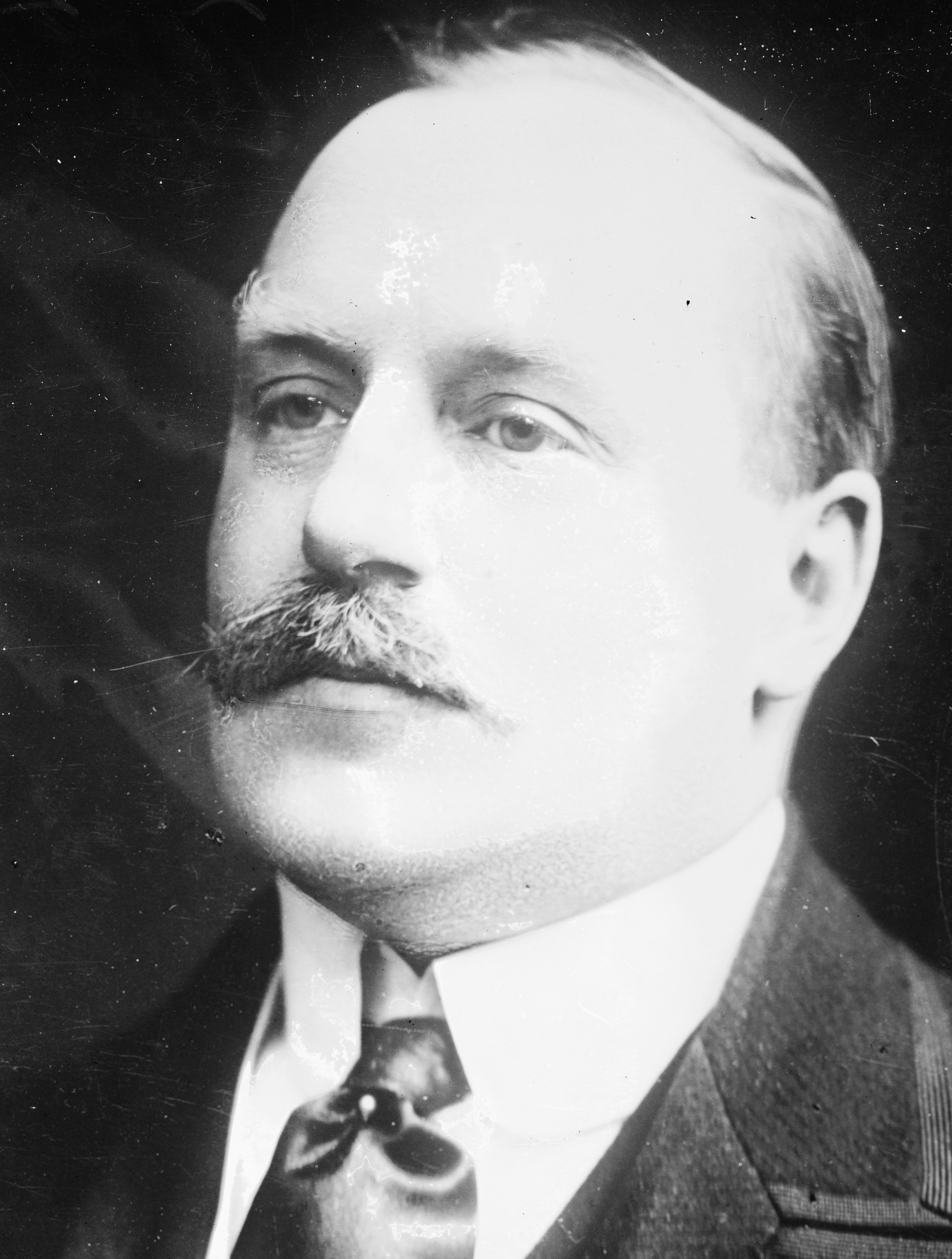

Member of Parliament for Ormskirk
- In office 1898–1918
- Preceded by: Sir Arthur Forwood
- Succeeded by: James Bell

Personal details
- Born: 18 November 1869
- Died: 4 November 1947 (aged 77)
- Party: Conservative
- Parents: Frederick Stanley, 16th Earl of Derby (father); Constance Villiers (mother)
- Relatives: Edward Stanley, 17th Earl of Derby (brother); Victor Stanley (brother); George Stanley (brother); Isobel Gathorne-Hardy (sister)

Sir Arthur Stanley (18 November 1869 – 4 November 1947) was a British Conservative politician, humanitarian, and Chairman of the Joint War Organisation of the British Red Cross Society and the Order of Saint John of Jerusalem in England during World War I and World War II.

== Biography ==
Arthur Stanley was born on 18 November 1869, the third son of the Hon. Frederick Stanley (later 16th Earl of Derby) and Lady Constance Villiers (later Countess of Derby). He was one of ten siblings, though two did not survive childhood: his twin brother, Geoffrey, died on 16 March 1871 and his sister, Katherine Mary, died later that same year on 21 October. He relocated to Canada with his family after his father was appointed Governor General of Canada in 1888 and became an avid ice hockey player. He was a member of the Rideau Hall Rebels, one of the first ice hockey teams in Canada, and also played alongside his older brother Edward (later 17th Earl of Derby).

The family returned to England in 1893 and Stanley was elected as member of parliament (MP) for Ormskirk in 1898, a position he held until 1918. He was Provincial Grand Master of the Isle of Man Freemasons from 1902 to 1912 and had a Lodge named in his honour, he was also Chairman of the Royal Automobile Club from 1905 to 1907 and from 1912 to 1936 and Treasurer of St Thomas' Hospital from 1917 to 1943. He was knighted for his services in 1917, becoming GBE.

Stanley served as a senior member of the British Red Cross Society throughout much of his professional career and served as Chairman of the Joint War Organisation of the British Red Cross Society and of the Order of St John of Jerusalem throughout World War I and during World War II, 1939 to 1946.

Through his service with the British Red Cross and his role as a Member of Parliament during the First World War, Stanley became aware of the shortage of well-trained nurses. Subsequently, in 1916 Stanley became a co-founder of the College of Nursing (later Royal College of Nursing) alongside Dame Sarah Swift, Dame Sidney Browne and Rachael Cox-Davies. He was chair of council for the College of Nursing 1916-1941 and made a vice president in 1941.

He was appointed GCVO in 1944.

He died unmarried at the age of 77 on 4 November 1947 in Eastbourne, Sussex, and was buried in the family crypt at St Mary's Church, Knowsley Village, Merseyside.

Parliament of the United Kingdom
Preceded by Sir Arthur Forwood	Member of Parliament for Ormskirk; 1898 – 1918	Succeeded by James Bell
