= 1898 Ormskirk by-election =

UK parliamentary by-election

The 1898 Ormskirk by-election was held on 20 October 1898 after the death of the incumbent Conservative Party MP Sir Arthur Forwood. It was retained by the unopposed Conservative Candidate Arthur Stanley.

Ormskirk by-election, 1898
Party	Candidate	Votes	%	±%
Conservative	Arthur Stanley	Unopposed	N/A	N/A
Conservative hold				
