= 1936 Ross and Cromarty by-election =

UK parliamentary by-election

- 10 February 1936
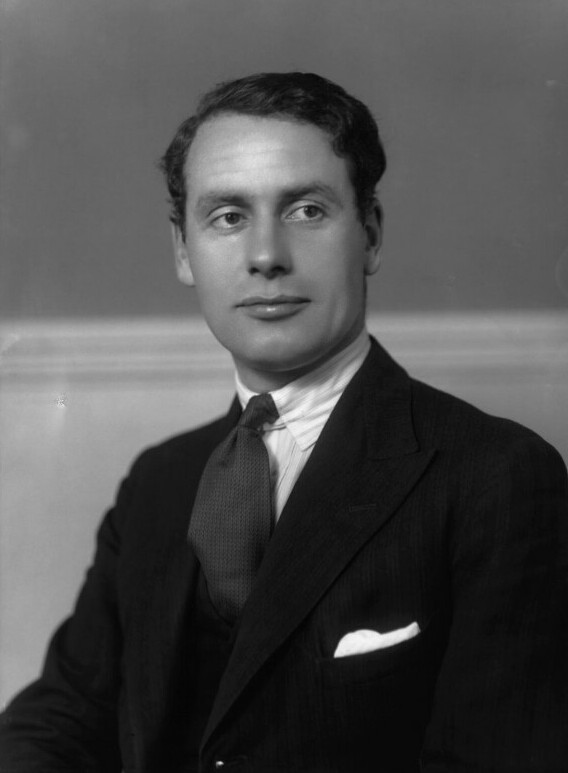

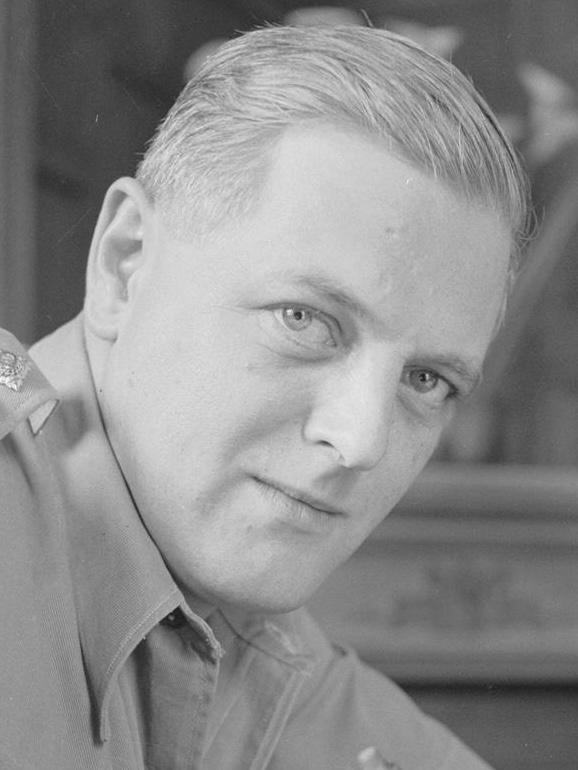
		Lab
Candidate	Malcolm MacDonald	Hector McNeil	Randolph Churchill
Party	National Labour	Labour	Unionist
Popular vote	8,949	5,967	2,427
Percentage	49.5%	33.0%	13.4%
- Map showing the Ross and Cromarty Parliamentary constituency within Scotland.
MP before election
Sir Ian Macpherson
Liberal National
Subsequent MP
Malcolm MacDonald
National

The 1936 Ross and Cromarty by-election was a parliamentary by-election for the British House of Commons constituency of Ross and Cromarty held on 10 February 1936. The by-election was triggered when Sir Ian Macpherson, a Liberal National was given a peerage. This enabled cabinet minister Malcolm MacDonald to return to Parliament.

== Candidates ==
At the 1935 general election, held a few weeks before, Malcolm MacDonald, son of former Prime Minister Ramsay MacDonald, and Dominions Secretary in the National Government, narrowly lost his Bassetlaw seat and was therefore looking for a new seat.

The Liberal National association, which was the dominant Liberal faction in the constituency, approached MacDonald about standing as a National Government candidate, and he agreed. It was later alleged that David Margesson, National Government Chief Whip, and Sir Ian Macpherson had arranged the selection of MacDonald as a National Government candidate to provide a seat for him.

The local Unionist association had previously backed Sir Ian Macpherson, as a supporter of the National Government. However, some members of the association, mainly farmers from the Easter Ross area, objected to the candidacy of MacDonald, believing that as a member of the National Labour Organisation he was still a Socialist at heart, and that he would not represent the interests of farmers. They also regarded MacDonald as having been "foisted" on the constituency.

These Unionists asked Randolph Churchill, son of Winston Churchill, to be their candidate and he consented. This caused divisions in the local Unionists, and the Chairman, Sir William Martineau resigned, declaring his support for Malcolm MacDonald. The association voted by 160 votes to 47 to adopt Churchill. It was alleged that Churchill's supporters had packed the meeting with 60 farm labourers instructed to vote for him, although this number would not have changed the outcome.

The Scottish Liberal Federation, representing the Liberal Party, was also angered by the Ross & Cromarty Liberal Nationals' adoption of an ex-Labour politician, and was determined to contest the seat, despite having great difficulty finding a candidate. At a Liberal meeting in the constituency, three quarters of those attending were opposed to contesting the seat. Nevertheless, Dr. Russell Thomas was adopted as candidate.

The Labour Party had high hopes of winning the seat, and selected as its candidate Hector McNeil, a Glasgow councillor, who had narrowly missed winning the Kelvingrove seat at the recent General Election. The Scottish National Party decided not to contest the seat. Despite rumours the British Union of Fascists would contest the seat, they did not stand either.

== Campaign ==
Being held in the middle of winter, all candidates' campaigns were hindered by bad weather, impassable roads and road accidents. During a snowball fight between National Government supporters and opponents, Malcolm MacDonald was accidentally struck in the face with a snowball which broke his glasses, causing minor damage to one eye. This forced him to take several days off from campaigning. The campaign was also suspended for several days following the death of King George V and only resumed after his funeral.

The campaign was notable for many verbal attacks on MacDonald by Churchill, who said his opponent had a "deplorable record", merely wanted to "get his greedy paws on the high offices of state", and that people resented the constituency being "used as a dumping ground for ministers who have been defeated".

MacDonald ran a strong campaign, focusing on farmers' needs and emphasising a tactical voting message - that a vote for "any other candidate" would in fact be a vote for Labour. A great many National Government MPs came to speak on his behalf, while Churchill was notably lacking in supporters.

All candidates worked hard to cover the vast constituency, MacDonald covered 200 miles in one day and the Labour candidate, driving in the bad weather, crashed his car twice. There was enormous interest in the election, and the weather improved greatly for polling day. The turnout went up from around 50% to 65%. Some voters in the remote areas of Wester Ross faced a journey of up to 22 miles to vote.

== Result ==
MacDonald won the seat with a majority of 2,982 or 16.5%. Labour increased its share of the vote by nearly 10%. Churchill polled poorly, only just saving his deposit, and the Liberal candidate did extremely badly, with just 4% of the vote.

Ross and Cromarty by-election, 10 February 1936
Party	Candidate	Votes	%	±%
National Labour	Malcolm MacDonald	8,949	49.5	N/A
Labour	Hector McNeil	5,967	33.0	+9.7
Unionist	Randolph Churchill	2,427	13.4	N/A
Liberal	Russell Thomas	738	4.1	N/A
Majority		2,982	16.5	N/A
Turnout		17,981		
National Labour gain from Liberal National		Swing		

== Previous election result ==
General election 1935: Ross and Cromarty
Party	Candidate	Votes	%	±%
Liberal National	Ian Macpherson	10,810	76.7	N/A
Labour	John MacKinnon MacDiarmid	3,284	23.3	New
Majority		7,526	53.4	N/A
Turnout		14,094	50.8	N/A
Liberal National hold		Swing	N/A	
