= Hattie Stowe =

Historical play by British Writer Ian Hay

- Written by: Ian Hay
- Original language: English
- Genre: Historical

Premiere
- Date premiered: 11 February 1947
- Place premiered: Embassy Theatre, London

Hattie Stowe is a 1947 historical play by the British writer Ian Hay. It portrays the life of the nineteenth century American abolitionist Harriet Beecher Stowe. It was very different in tone from Hay's usual plays, generally light comedies with naval themes. It was first staged at the Embassy Theatre in the West End on 11 February 1947.

== Bibliography ==
- Wearing, J.P. The London Stage 1940-1949: A Calendar of Productions, Performers, and Personnel. Rowman & Littlefield, 2014.
