= The Sport of Kings (play) =

1924 play

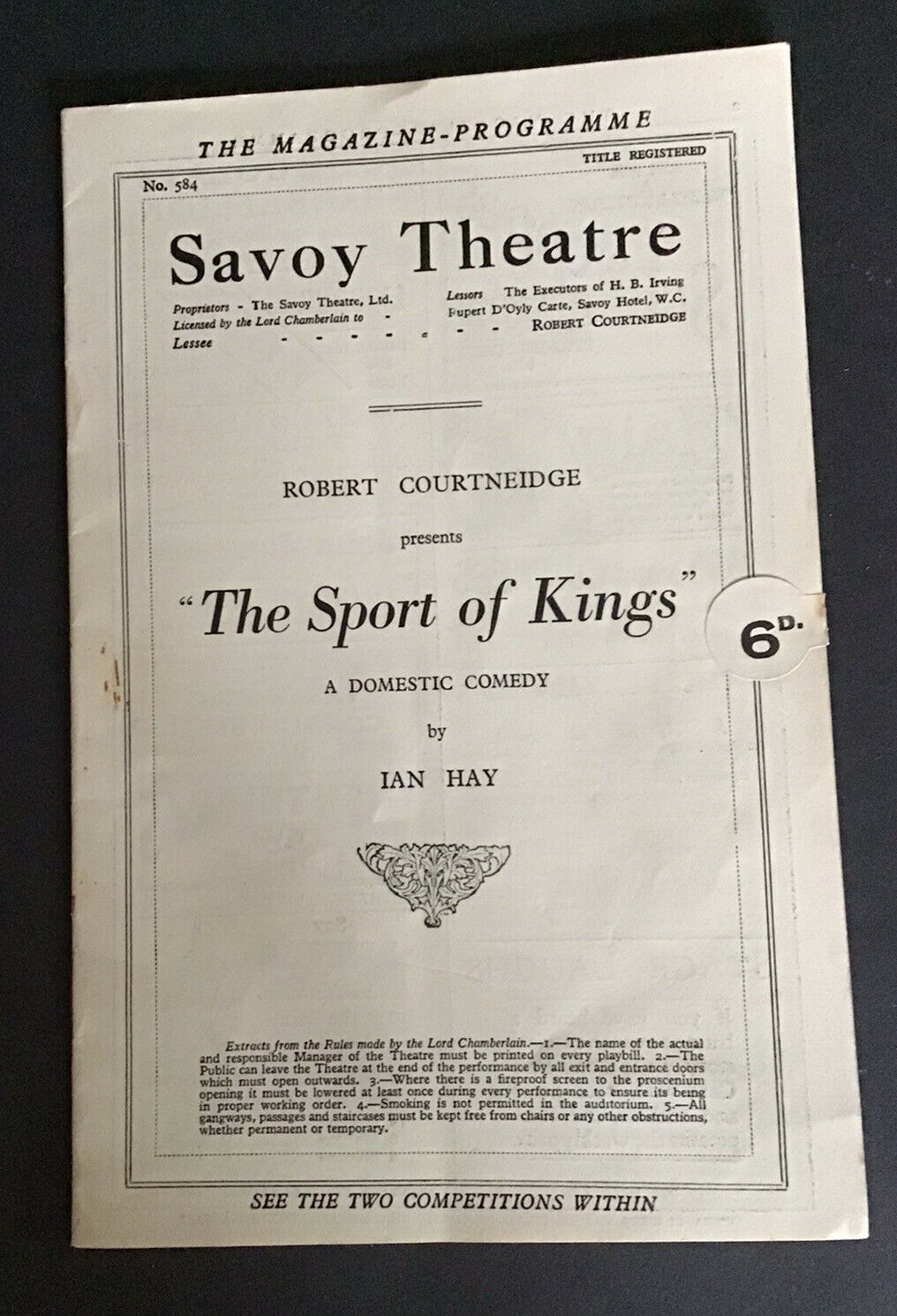
- Original language: English
- Written by: Ian Hay
- Genre: Comedy

Premiere
- Date: 8 September 1924
- Place: Savoy Theatre, London

The Sport of Kings is a 1924 comedy play by the British writer Ian Hay. It ran for 319 performance at the Savoy Theatre in the West End between 8 September 1924 and 13 June 1925.

== Adaptation ==
In 1931 it was adapted into a film The Sport of Kings by Gainsborough Pictures. It was directed by Victor Saville and starred Leslie Henson and Gordon Harker.

== Bibliography ==
- Goble, Alan. The Complete Index to Literary Sources in Film. Walter de Gruyter, 1999.
- Wearing, J. P. The London Stage 1920-1929: A Calendar of Productions, Performers, and Personnel. Rowman & Littlefield, 2014.
