= Roger Maxwell (actor) =

English film actor (1900–1971)

- Born: Roger Done Latham; 1 January 1900; Chelsea, London, England
- Died: 24 November 1971 (aged 71); Onchan, Isle of Man
- Occupation: Actor
- Years active: 1927–1971
- Cricket career

Cricket information
- Batting: Unknown

Domestic team information
- Years: Team
- 1920: Marylebone Cricket Club

Career statistics
Competition	First-class
Matches	1
Runs scored	16
Batting average	–
100s/50s	–/–
Top score	16*
Catches/stumpings	–/–
- Source: Roger Latham at Cricinfo

Roger Maxwell real name Roger Done Latham (1 January 1900 – 24 November 1971) was an English actor and first-class cricketer.

The son of Alexander Mere Latham, he was born at Chelsea on New Year's Day in 1900. He was educated at Wellington College, completing his education there in 1917. With the First World War ongoing, Maxwell attended the Royal Military College, Sandhurst from which he graduated into the Middlesex Regiment as a second lieutenant in August 1918. Following the war, he was promoted to lieutenant in September 1921, which was antedated to February 1920. Maxwell played first-class cricket for the Marylebone Cricket Club (MCC) against the British Army cricket team at Lord's in June 1920. Batting once in the match, he ended the MCC's first innings unbeaten on 16, sharing in a 58 runs stand for the final wicket with Richard Busk.

Progressing into a career in acting, Maxwell's first role was in the 1927 docudrama The Battles of Coronel and Falkland Islands. On stage he appeared in the West End in Ian Hay's Leave It to Psmith and Off the Record, Terence Rattigan's Who Is Sylvia? and Peter Jones's The Party Spirit.

In 1959, he was a member of the jury at the Venice Film Festival.

Maxwell died on the Isle of Man at Onchan in November 1971.

== Filmography ==
Year	Title	Role	Notes
1927	The Battles of Coronel and Falkland Islands		
1938	Save a Little Sunshine	Hector Stanley	
1949	Badger's Green	Sir John	
1949	Stop Press Girl	Director	Uncredited
1950	Ha'penny Breeze	Mr. Simmonds	
1951	Mr Drake's Duck	Col. Maitland	
1951	Night Was Our Friend	Colonel	
1952	Song of Paris	Weldon	
1952	Treasure Hunt	Military-Looking Man	Uncredited
1952	Girdle of Gold	Chairman of the Bench	
1953	Deadly Nightshade	Col. Smythe	
1953	The Steel Key		
1953	Glad Tidings		Uncredited
1954	John Wesley	General Holt	
1954	Colonel March of Scotland Yard	The Major	
1955	No Smoking	Major	
1955	The Cockleshell Heroes	Passenger on train	Uncredited
1956	Keep It Clean	General Ponsonby-Goreham	
1956	Reach for the Sky	Pantiles	Uncredited
1959	The Captain's Table	Fred	Uncredited
1960	A Touch of Larceny	Club Member #2	
1960	The Angry Silence	Collins	
1963	The Cracksman	Magistrate	Uncredited
1965	Doctor Zhivago	Beef-Faced Colonel	
1970	The Rise and Rise of Michael Rimmer	Party chairman	
1971	Dad's Army	General Wilkinson "Peppery Old Gent"	(final film role)
