= Sir Ronald Cross, 1st Baronet =

British politician and diplomat

The Right Honourable Sir Ronald Cross Bt KCMG KCVO
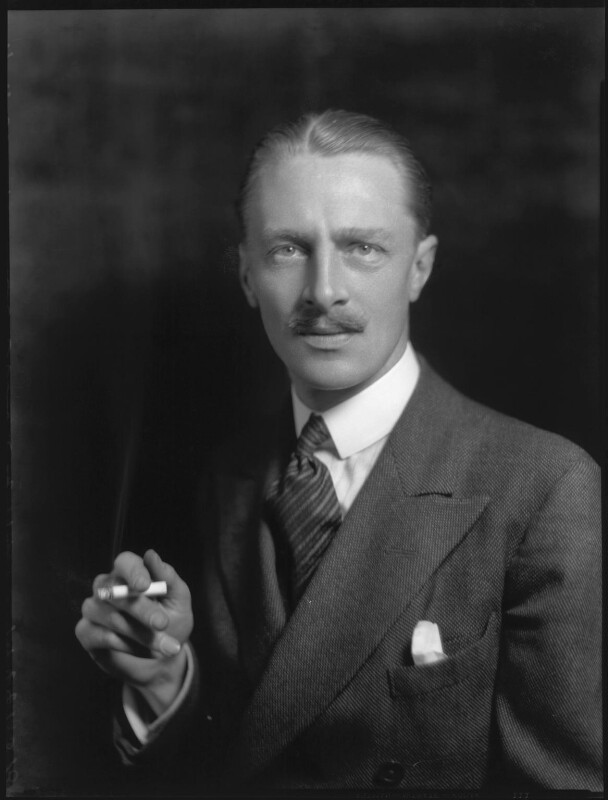

17th Governor of Tasmania
- In office 22 August 1951 – 4 June 1958
- Monarchs: George VI; Elizabeth II
- Premier: Robert Cosgrove
- Preceded by: Hugh Binney
- Succeeded by: Thomas Corbett, 2nd Baron Rowallan

Member of Parliament for Ormskirk
- In office 25 February 1950 – 5 April 1951
- Preceded by: Harold Wilson
- Succeeded by: Arthur Salter

Personal details
- Born: 9 May 1896 Pendleton, Lancashire, England
- Died: 3 June 1968 (aged 72) Westminster, London, England
- Party: Conservative
- Spouse: Louise Marion Green-Emmott

Sir Ronald Hibbert Cross, 1st Baronet, KCMG, KCVO, PC (9 May 1896 – 3 June 1968) was a British politician and diplomat. He served as Governor of Tasmania 1951-58.

== Early life and education ==
Cross was educated at Ludgrove Preparatory School and then Eton College. He served with the Duke of Lancaster's Own Yeomanry and as a pilot with the Royal Flying Corps in World War I.

== Career ==
At the 1931 general election, Cross was elected as Conservative Member of Parliament (MP) for Rossendale. He served successively as government whip (1935), Junior Lord of the Treasury (1937), Vice-Chamberlain of the Household (1937–38) and Parliamentary Secretary to the Board of Trade (1938–39). He was sworn into the Privy Council in 1940.

During the Second World War, Cross served as Minister of Economic Warfare (1939–40) and Minister of Shipping (1940–41). In 1941, he was removed as Minister of Shipping after his performance was criticized by the press. The same year, he was appointed British High Commissioner to Australia and created a Baronet, of Bolton-le-Moors in the County Palatine of Lancaster. Cross returned to the United Kingdom in 1945 but lost his seat at that year's election.

In 1950, Cross was elected in the seat of Ormskirk, Lancashire. He later served as Governor of Tasmania from 23 August 1951 to 4 June 1958. He was appointed a Knight Commander of the Royal Victorian Order (KCVO) by Queen Elizabeth II when she visited Hobart during her Coronation Tour in 1954. He was later appointed Knight Commander of the Order of St Michael and St George (KCMG) in the 1955 New Year Honours. He was a popular governor, well regarded in the island State.

Cross married Louise Marion Green-Emmott in 1925. They had four daughters and a son who predeceased him.

Parliament of the United Kingdom
Preceded by Arthur Law	Member of Parliament for Rossendale; 1931–1945	Succeeded by George Walker
Preceded by Harold Wilson	Member of Parliament for Ormskirk; 1950–1951	Succeeded by Arthur Salter
Political offices
Preceded by Arthur Hope	Vice-Chamberlain of the Household; 1937–1938	Succeeded by Robert Grimston
New title New office	Minister of Economic Warfare; 1939–1940	Succeeded by Hugh Dalton
Preceded by Robert Hudson	Minister of Shipping; 1940–1941	Office abolished
Diplomatic posts
Preceded by Sir Geoffrey Whiskard	High Commissioner to Australia; 1941–1945	Succeeded by Sir Edward Williams
Government offices
Preceded by Sir Hugh Binney	Governor of Tasmania; 1951–1958	Succeeded by The Lord Rowallan
Baronetage of the United Kingdom
New title	Baronet (of Bolton-le-Moors, Lancashire); 1941–1968	Extinct
