= Samuel Rosbotham =

British farmer and politician (1864–1950)

Sir Samuel Rosbotham

Member of Parliament for Ormskirk
- In office 30 May 1929 – 19 October 1939
- Preceded by: Francis Blundell
- Succeeded by: Stephen King-Hall

Personal details
- Born: 26 June 1864 Bickerstaffe, Lancashire
- Died: 12 March 1950 (aged 85) Southport, Lancashire
- Party: Labour (1924–31); National Labour (after 1931)
- Spouse: Joan Dearden

Sir Samuel Thomas Rosbotham (26 June 1864 – 12 March 1950), known as 'Sam Tom', was a British farmer and National Labour politician who served as the member of parliament for Ormskirk from 1929 to his resignation in 1939.

== Early life ==
Born to Samuel and Mary (née Heathcote) in 1864, he carried on his fathers occupation as a farmer at Holly and Stanley farms in Bickerstaffe, before marrying Jane Heyes in 1887, producing seven children. He was elected to Lancashire County Council in 1895, later becoming a county alderman. In 1909 he became chairman of the Lancashire Farmers Association, a post he held for twenty years.

During The First World War he was the chairman of the Ormskirk War Agricultural Committee, working to make short-term credit available for the small farmers. Following the war he was appointed to the Agricultural Wages Board as an employers' representative.

== Parliament ==
In October 1922 Rosbotham announced his candidacy as an Independent Conservative candidate for his local constituency of Ormskirk at the upcoming general election. In the event he did not contest the election. By the time of the 1924 general election Rosbotham had changed his allegiance to the Labour Party, campaigning against the sitting Conservative MP, Francis Blundell. Following a bitter contest Blundell brought an action for slander against Rosbotham for making "false statements of fact in relation to the plaintiff's character and conduct for the purpose of affecting his return to parliament".

At the next general election in 1929 Rosbotham stood as the Labour candidate against Blundell at Ormskirk, and was elected to the Commons. His victory was thought to be partly due to a change in the nature of the electorate, due to the building of a number of large housing estates by Liverpool City Council in the area.

With the formation of a National Government in August 1931 he moved to the National Labour Organisation. This led to the Ormskirk Divisional Labour Party declaring that he no longer represented them and that they would select another candidate to run against him at the next election. He was formally expelled from the Labour Party in October 1931.

He was appointed as a justice of the peace in 1930, was knighted "for political and public services" in the 1933 New Year Honours, and was re-elected as a National Labour MP in 1931 and 1935. At the 1935 election both National Labour leader Ramsay MacDonald and his son Malcolm MacDonald lost their seats, and Rosbotham offered to resign to allow either of them to contest the resulting by-election. His offer was not accepted.

== Resignation ==
In 1938 Rosbotham indicated that he would not be contesting the next general election. This led to a dispute as he failed to give whole-hearted support to Stephen King-Hall, who had been selected to replace him as the National Government's candidate. In April 1939 the local National Government Coordinating Committee passed a resolution that Rosbotham "was not a suitable person to continue to represent the Division in Parliament". In October 1939, aged 75 he chose to retire, resigning his seat by applying for appointment as Steward and Bailiff of the Manor of Northstead.

== Life after Parliament and death ==
His first wife died in 1945, and in 1946 Rosbotham married Joan Dearden of Waterfoot, Lancashire.

He died suddenly at his Southport home in March 1950, aged 85, and was buried in the graveyard of Bickerstaffe Parish Church.

Parliament of the United Kingdom
Preceded by Francis Blundell	Member of Parliament for Ormskirk; 1929–1939	Succeeded by Stephen King-Hall
