= A Safety Match (novel) =

Novel by Ian Hay

- Author: Ian Hay
- Language: English
- Publication date: 1911
- Publication place: United Kingdom
- Media type: Print

A Safety Match is a 1911 novel by the British writer Ian Hay. In 1921 it was adapted by Hay into a play of the same title.

== Bibliography ==
- George Watson & Ian R. Willison. The New Cambridge Bibliography of English Literature, Volume 4. CUP, 1972.
