= Ormskirk (constituency) =

Parliamentary constituency in the United Kingdom, 1885–1983

- Former county constituency for the House of Commons
- Ormskirk in Lancashire, showing boundaries used from 1974-1983
- County: Lancashire

1885–1983
- Seats: One
- Created from: South West Lancashire
- Replaced by: West Lancashire, Knowsley North, St Helens North and Crosby

Ormskirk was a county constituency represented in the House of Commons of the Parliament of the United Kingdom. It elected one Member of Parliament (MP) by the first past the post system of election. It was created by the Redistribution of Seats Act 1885 as a division of the parliamentary county of Lancashire. The constituency boundaries were changed in 1918, 1950, 1955 and 1974.

== History ==
The constituency was a Labour - Conservative marginal for much of its history, changing hands several times between the two parties during its 98-year existence.

The seat was initially a safe Conservative seat under the influence of the Stanleys, the Earls of Derby. Indeed, the seat was held for twenty years by Arthur Stanley, a younger son of the 16th Earl. The only serious challenge by the Liberal Party in this period was in 1910 when William Lever, the leading industrialist, contested the seat. Indeed, this was the last time the Liberal Party would contest the constituency until the 1970s.

James Bell became the first non Conservative to be elected for this seat since its creation in 1885, principally due to a divided conservative vote between the Coalition Conservatives and the candidate of the National Farmers Union at the 1918 general election. Francis Blundell regained the seat for the Conservatives in 1922 but was to lose it to Labour's Sam Tom Rosbotham in 1929.

Sam Tom followed Ramsay MacDonald when the Labour Party split in 1931, and then defended the seat successfully for National Labour in both 1931 and 1935. He was succeeded in 1939 by Commander Stephen King-Hall for National Labour.

In a repeat of 1918, the election of 1945 saw future Prime Minister, Harold Wilson elected when the Conservative Party opted to stand against the National candidate, Stephen King-Hall, and split the anti Labour vote. With Harold Wilson moving in 1950 to the newly created Huyton constituency, the seat saw a succession of Conservative Members who were then moved on to the House of Lords, until the election of the much respected Colonel Douglas Glover in the 1953 by-election.

The retirement of Douglas Glover in 1970 saw the election of Harold Soref for the Conservatives who, however, was only to hold the seat for four years. Boundary changes brought in Kirkby New Town, leading to the election of Robert Kilroy-Silk for Labour.

The constituency ceased to exist with the implementation of the 1983 boundary changes. The sitting MP moved to the new Knowsley North seat.

== Boundaries ==
=== 1885–1918 ===
The constituency, officially designated as South-West Lancashire, Ormskirk Division consisted of the town of Ormskirk and a number of surrounding parishes, namely: Aintree, Aughton, Bickerstaffe, Croxteth Park, Dalton, Downholland, Halsall, Kirkby, Knowsley, Lathom, Litherland, Lunt, Lydiate, Maghull, Melling, Netherton, Ormskirk, Orrell and Ford, Prescot, Scarisbrick, Sefton, Simonswood, Skelmersdale & Upholland.

=== 1918–1950 ===
The Representation of the People Act 1918 reorganised constituencies throughout the United Kingdom. Boundaries were adjusted and seats were defined in terms of the districts created by the Local Government Act 1894. According to the schedules of the Act, the Lancashire, Ormskirk Division comprised:

- Formby Urban District
- Lathom and Burscough Urban District
- Ormskirk Urban District
- Rainford Urban District
- Skelmersdale Urban District
- Upholland Urban District
- Sefton Rural District
- West Lancashire Rural District
- The civil parish of Dalton from Wigan Rural District

=== 1950–1955 ===
The Representation of the People Act 1948 redistributed parliamentary seats, with the constituencies first being used in the general election of 1950. The term "county constituency" was introduced in place of "division". Ormskirk County Constituency was redefined as consisting of the following districts:

- Formby Urban District
- Ormskirk Urban District
- Rainford Urban District
- West Lancashire Rural District (except the parishes of Aintree and Ford)

This reflected local government boundary changes in 1931–32: Lathom & Burscough UD had been absorbed by Ormskirk UD and Sefton RD by West Lancashire RD.

=== 1955–1974 ===
Following further council boundary changes in 1954, the remaining parishes from West Lancashire RD, (Aintree and Ford), were included in the constituency from 1955.

=== 1974–1983 ===
From 1970 the seat was again redefined, to cover the urban districts of Formby, Kirkby, Ormskirk and Rainford, and West Lancashire Rural District.

== Abolition ==
The constituency was abolished by the Parliamentary Constituencies (England) Order 1983, which redrew constituencies based on the new counties and districts created in 1974.

The Ormskirk area became part of West Lancashire, Kirkby was included in Knowsley North, Rainford in St Helens North and Formby, Aintree and Melling in Crosby.

== Members of Parliament ==
Election	Member	Party
1885	Arthur Forwood	Conservative
1898 by-election	Arthur Stanley	Conservative
1918	James Bell	Labour
1922	Francis Blundell	Conservative
1929	Samuel Rosbotham	Labour
1931	Samuel Rosbotham	National Labour
1939 by-election	Stephen King-Hall	National Labour
1945	Harold Wilson	Labour
1950	Ronald Cross	Conservative
1951 by-election	Arthur Salter	Conservative
1953 by-election	Douglas Glover	Conservative
1970	Harold Soref	Conservative
Feb 1974	Robert Kilroy-Silk	Labour
1983	constituency abolished: see West Lancashire, Knowsley North, St Helens North & Crosby	

== Election results ==
=== Elections in the 1880s ===
General election 1885: Ormskirk
Party	Candidate	Votes	%	±%
Conservative	Arthur Forwood	5,133	68.7	
Liberal	John Prince Sheldon	2,343	31.3	
Majority		2,790	37.4	
Turnout		7,476	85.8	
Registered electors		8,714		
Conservative win (new seat)				

General election 1886: Ormskirk
Party	Candidate	Votes	%	±%
Conservative	Arthur Forwood	Unopposed		
Conservative hold				

=== Elections in the 1890s ===
General election 1892: Ormskirk
Party	Candidate	Votes	%	±%
Conservative	Arthur Forwood	4,618	68.7	N/A
Liberal	James Middlehurst	2,101	31.3	New
Majority		2,517	37.4	N/A
Turnout		6,719	70.3	N/A
Registered electors		9,553		
Conservative hold		Swing	N/A	

General election 1895: Ormskirk
Party	Candidate	Votes	%	±%
Conservative	Arthur Forwood	4,780	71.7	+3.0
Liberal	Thomas Stoner	1,885	28.3	−3.0
Majority		2,895	43.4	+6.0
Turnout		6,665	65.9	−4.4
Registered electors		10,107		
Conservative hold		Swing	+3.0	

Forwood's death caused a by-election.

By-election, 20 Oct 1898: Ormskirk
Party	Candidate	Votes	%	±%
Conservative	Arthur Stanley	Unopposed		
Conservative hold				

=== Elections in the 1900s ===
General election 1900: Ormskirk
Party	Candidate	Votes	%	±%
Conservative	Arthur Stanley	Unopposed		
Conservative hold				

General election 1906: Ormskirk
Party	Candidate	Votes	%	±%
Conservative	Arthur Stanley	6,207	61.5	N/A
Liberal	Climenson Yelverton Charles Dawbarn	3,891	38.5	New
Majority		2,316	23.0	N/A
Turnout		10,098	80.0	N/A
Registered electors		12,624		
Conservative hold		Swing	N/A	

=== Elections in the 1910s ===
General election January 1910: Ormskirk
Party	Candidate	Votes	%	±%
Conservative	Arthur Stanley	6,919	59.7	−1.8
Liberal	William Lever	4,679	40.3	+1.8
Majority		2,240	19.4	−3.6
Turnout		11,598	85.8	+5.8
Conservative hold		Swing		

General election December 1910: Ormskirk
Party	Candidate	Votes	%	±%
Conservative	Arthur Stanley	Unopposed		
Conservative hold				

General election 1918: Ormskirk
Party	Candidate	Votes	%	±%
Labour	James Bell	6,545	37.2	New
Unionist	Thomas Fermor-Hesketh	6,080	34.5	N/A
National Farmers Union	Stephen Hirst	4,989	28.3	New
Majority		465	2.7	N/A
Turnout		17,614	61.0	N/A
Labour gain from Unionist		Swing	N/A	

=== Elections in the 1920s ===
General election 1922: Ormskirk
Party	Candidate	Votes	%	±%
Unionist	Francis Blundell	11,921	58.7	+24.2
Labour	James Bell	8,374	41.3	+4.1
Majority		3,547	17.4	N/A
Turnout		20,295	67.8	+6.8
Unionist gain from Labour		Swing		

General election 1923: Ormskirk
Party	Candidate	Votes	%	±%
Unionist	Francis Blundell	10,598	53.0	−5.7
Labour	Robert Barrie Walker	9,388	47.0	+5.7
Majority		1,210	6.0	−11.4
Turnout		19,986	65.7	−2.1
Unionist hold		Swing	-5.7	

General election 1924: Ormskirk
Party	Candidate	Votes	%	±%
Unionist	Francis Blundell	13,392	56.3	+3.3
Labour	Robert Barrie Walker	10,402	43.7	−3.3
Majority		2,990	12.6	+6.6
Turnout		23,794	75.9	+10.2
Unionist hold		Swing		

General election 1929: Ormskirk
Party	Candidate	Votes	%	±%
Labour	Samuel Rosbotham	20,350	53.4	+9.7
Unionist	Francis Blundell	17,761	46.6	−9.7
Majority		2,589	6.8	N/A
Turnout		38,111	74.8	−1.1
Labour gain from Unionist		Swing	+9.7	

=== Elections in the 1930s ===
General election 1931: Ormskirk
Party	Candidate	Votes	%	±%
National Labour	Samuel Rosbotham	30,368	75.0	N/A
Labour	F V King	10,115	25.0	−28.4
Majority		20,253	50.0	N/A
Turnout		40,485	71.7	−3.1
National Labour gain from Labour		Swing		

General election 1935: Ormskirk
Party	Candidate	Votes	%	±%
National Labour	Samuel Rosbotham	27,624	58.5	−16.5
Labour	F V King	19,579	41.5	+16.5
Majority		8,045	17.0	−33.0
Turnout		47,203	65.8	−5.9
National Labour hold		Swing		

1939 Ormskirk by-election

In the Ormskirk By-Election of 27 October 1939, Stephen King-Hall, National Labour was elected unopposed.

=== Elections in the 1940s ===
General election 1945: Ormskirk
Party	Candidate	Votes	%	±%
Labour	Harold Wilson	30,126	46.3	+4.8
Conservative	A C Greg	23,104	35.5	New
National Independent	Stephen King-Hall	11,848	18.2	N/A
Majority		7,022	10.8	N/A
Turnout		65,078	69.3	+3.5
Labour gain from National Labour		Swing		

=== Elections in the 1950s ===
General election 1950: Ormskirk
Party	Candidate	Votes	%	±%
Conservative	Ronald Cross	28,654	66.27	
Labour	LC Edwards	14,583	33.73	
Majority		14,071	32.54	N/A
Turnout		43,237	83.9	
Conservative gain from Labour		Swing		

1951 Ormskirk by-election
Party	Candidate	Votes	%	±%
Conservative	Arthur Salter	24,190	71.47	+5.20
Labour	H A Kelly	8,969	26.50	−7.23
Ind. Labour Party	Fred Barton	689	2.04	New
Majority		15,221	44.97	+21.12
Turnout		33,848		
Conservative hold		Swing		

General election 1951: Ormskirk
Party	Candidate	Votes	%	±%
Conservative	Arthur Salter	26,729	67.43	+1.16
Labour	Ernest Kavanagh	12,908	32.57	−1.16
Majority		13,821	34.86	+2.32
Turnout		39,637	78.68	
Conservative hold		Swing		

1953 Ormskirk by-election
Party	Candidate	Votes	%	±%
Conservative	Douglas Glover	17,984	65.38	−2.02
Labour	Muriel Ferguson	9,512	34.62	+2.02
Majority		8,472	30.76	−4.04
Turnout		27,496		
Conservative hold		Swing		

General election 1955: Ormskirk
Party	Candidate	Votes	%	±%
Conservative	Douglas Glover	27,066	68.36	+0.93
Labour	Thomas W Henry	12,527	31.64	−0.93
Majority		14,539	36.72	+1.86
Turnout		39539	73.05	
Conservative hold		Swing		

General election 1959: Ormskirk
Party	Candidate	Votes	%	±%
Conservative	Douglas Glover	32,952	69.15	+0.79
Labour	Gwilym Roberts	14,701	30.85	−0.79
Majority		18,251	38.30	+1.58
Turnout		47,653	77.59	+4.54
Conservative hold		Swing		

=== Elections in the 1960s ===
General election 1964: Ormskirk
Party	Candidate	Votes	%	±%
Conservative	Douglas Glover	33,704	62.54	−6.61
Labour	James Harold	20,186	37.46	+6.61
Majority		13,518	25.08	−13.22
Turnout		53,890	75.85	−1.74
Conservative hold		Swing		

General election 1966: Ormskirk
Party	Candidate	Votes	%	±%
Conservative	Douglas Glover	32,763	58.77	−3.77
Labour	William J. Quinn	22,983	41.23	+3.77
Majority		9,780	17.54	−7.54
Turnout		55,746	73.87	−1.98
Conservative hold		Swing		

=== Elections in the 1970s ===
General election 1970: Ormskirk
Party	Candidate	Votes	%	±%
Conservative	Harold Soref	40,517	61.4	+2.6
Labour	Robert Kilroy-Silk	25,486	38.6	−2.6
Majority		15,031	22.77	+5.3
Turnout		66,003	72.49	−1.38
Conservative hold		Swing		

General election February 1974: Ormskirk
Party	Candidate	Votes	%	±%
Labour	Robert Kilroy-Silk	34,807	47.19	
Conservative	Harold Soref	27,004	36.61	
Liberal	David Parry	11,949	16.20	New
Majority		7,803	10.58	N/A
Turnout		73,706	77.32	
Labour gain from Conservative		Swing		

General election October 1974: Ormskirk
Party	Candidate	Votes	%	±%
Labour	Robert Kilroy-Silk	35,392	50.33	+3.14
Conservative	Brian Keefe	26,541	37.74	+1.13
Liberal	David Parry	8,387	11.93	−4.27
Majority		8,851	12.59	+2.01
Turnout		70,320	72.80	−4.52
Labour hold		Swing		

General election 1979: Ormskirk
Party	Candidate	Votes	%	±%
Labour	Robert Kilroy-Silk	37,222	50.03	−0.33
Conservative	Brian Keefe	36,364	48.87	+11.13
Workers Revolutionary	S Pirani	820	1.10	New
Majority		858	1.15	
Turnout		74,406	76.11	+3.31
Labour hold		Swing		

== See also ==
- West Lancashire Constituency

== Sources ==
- Leigh Rayment's Historical List of MPs – Constituencies beginning with "O"
- Election results, 1950 - 1979
- F. W. S. Craig, British Parliamentary Election Results 1918 - 1949
- F. W. S. Craig, British Parliamentary Election Results 1885 - 1918
