= A Safety Match (play) =

Play by Ian Hay

- Written by: Ian Hay
- Original language: English

Premiere
- Date premiered: 13 January 1931
- Place premiered: Strand Theatre, London

A Safety Match is a 1921 play by the British writer Ian Hay, adapted from his own 1911 novel of the same title.

It ran for 229 performances at the Strand Theatre in London's West End between 13 January and 3 August 1921. The cast included Herbert Marshall and Clifford Mollison.

== Bibliography ==
- Wearing, J. P. The London Stage 1920-1929: A Calendar of Productions, Performers, and Personnel. Rowman & Littlefield, 2014.
