= A. W. Baskcomb =

British actor (1879–1939)

- Born: 5 July 1879; Pimlico, London, United Kingdom
- Died: 10 December 1939 (aged 60); Hampstead, London, United Kingdom
- Occupation: Actor

A. W. Baskcomb (5 July 1879 – 10 December 1939) was a British stage actor known for his comedy roles. He also appeared in several films. On stage he originated the role of Slightly in J.M. Barrie's 1904 play Peter and Wendy, continuing to play it for the next seven years. Other appearances included the Edwardian musical The Gay Gordons and Frederick Lonsdale's The Street Singer.

His daughter was the actress Betty Baskcomb. Three photographic portraits of Baskcomb are in the collection of the National Portrait Gallery, London.

== Filmography ==
- The Staff Dinner (1913, short)
- A Safe Proposition (1932)
- The Lodger (1932)
- The Midshipmaid (1932)
- The Good Companions (1933)

== Bibliography ==
- Bruce K. Hanson. Peter Pan on Stage and Screen, 1904-2010. McFarland, 2011.
