= 1939 Ormskirk by-election =

UK Parliamentary by-election

The 1939 Ormskirk by-election was held on 27 October 1939. The by-election was held due to the resignation of the incumbent National Labour MP, Samuel Rosbotham. It was won by the National Labour candidate Stephen King-Hall.
