= John Hay Beith =

British writer and historian (1876–1952)

Major-General John Hay Beith CBE MC
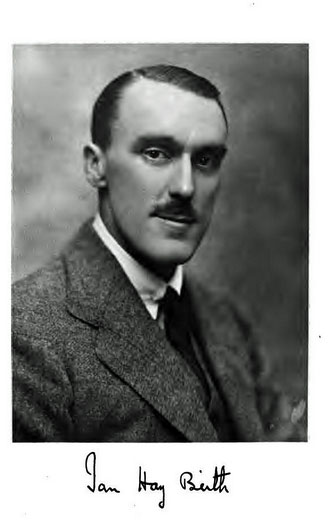
- Born: 17 April 1876; Rusholme, Manchester, England
- Died: 22 September 1952 (aged 76); Liss, Hampshire, England
- Occupations: Schoolmaster, soldier, writer
- Writing career
- Pen name: Ian Hay
- Period: 20th century
- Genres: Drama, novels, non-fiction
- Subjects: Romantic comedy, school life, military life

Major-General John Hay Beith, CBE MC (17 April 1876 – 22 September 1952) was a British schoolmaster and soldier, but is best remembered as a novelist, playwright, essayist, and historian who wrote under the pen name Ian Hay.

After reading Classics at Cambridge University, Beith became a schoolmaster. In 1907 his novel Pip was published; its success and that of several more novels enabled him to give up teaching in 1912 to be a full-time writer. During the First World War, Beith served as an officer in the army in France. His good-humoured account of army life, The First Hundred Thousand, published in 1915, was a best-seller. On the strength of this, he was sent to work in the information section of the British War Mission in Washington, D.C.

Following the war, Beith's novels did not achieve the popularity of his earlier work, but he made a considerable career as a dramatist, writing light comedies, often in collaboration with other authors including P. G. Wodehouse and Guy Bolton. During the Second World War Beith served as Director of Public Relations at the War Office, retiring in 1941 shortly before his 65th birthday.

Among Beith's later works were several war histories, which were not as well received as his comic fiction and plays. His one serious play, Hattie Stowe (1947), was politely reviewed but had a short run. In the same year he co-wrote a comedy, Off the Record, which ran for more than 700 performances.

== Life and career ==
=== Early years ===
John Hay Beith was born at Platt Abbey, Rusholme, Manchester, the third son and sixth child of John Alexander Beith, and his wife Janet, née Fleming. Beith senior was a cotton merchant, magistrate, and leading member of the local Liberals. Both Beith's parents were of Scottish descent; his paternal grandfather was a Presbyterian clergyman, Alexander Beith, one of the founders of the Free Church of Scotland in 1843. Like his father, Beith had a lifelong pride in his Scottish ancestry; he did not share his father's political views, and was a Conservative.

Beith was educated at a Manchester preparatory school, Lady Barn House, and then at Fettes College, Edinburgh. A contemporary there was the future Liberal cabinet minister John Simon, for whom the young Beith fagged. From Fettes he went up to St John's College, Cambridge, where he read Classics, distinguished himself at rugby, and captained the college boat club. After graduating with a second class degree, he held temporary teaching posts at Charterhouse and Fettes. Unable to secure a permanent position teaching Classics he returned to Cambridge and spent what a biographer called "a laborious year in acquiring sufficient knowledge of chemistry and physics to fit him for a Senior Mastership".

Beith joined Durham School in 1902 as junior science master; he also coached the rugby and boating crews. Durham was the model for Marbledown School in his 1936 play Housemaster. After four years at Durham, Beith taught for six years at Fettes, as master of one of the lower forms. He spent much of his leisure time in writing. His first novel, the schoolboy romance Pip (1907), appeared while he was still teaching at the school. He used the pen-name Ian Hay to save himself embarrassment in his professional capacity if the book failed. He offered the work to a succession of publishing firms, but it was rejected. Finally he paid a firm £50 to publish the book. (Note: The managing director of the firm was Edgar Wallace, who told Beith many years later that his £50 had saved the firm from collapse.) Pip was an immediate success, and was still selling forty years later. It was a critical as well as a commercial success: The Times Literary Supplement said, "Pip is a restful and cheering book. We recommend it earnestly to any one who may be suffering from a glut of the 'feminism' of the current English imitations of Maupassant." Beith's cautiously adopted pen name was redundant for its original purpose of camouflage in case of failure, but he decided to stick with it; he remained "Ian Hay" in all his published work thereafter. Between 1908 and 1914 he followed Pip with five more novels, characterised by The Times as "of the right stuff and happy-go-lucky, their good feeling saved from insipidity by its seasoning of piquant humour".

In 1912, Beith resigned from Fettes, to work full-time as an author. In April the following year he was chosen as prospective Unionist (i.e. Conservative) candidate for the Kirkcaldy Burghs constituency. He was unable to contest the seat as there was no general election until 1918, when the Unionists did not oppose the sitting member, a coalition Liberal.

=== First World War ===
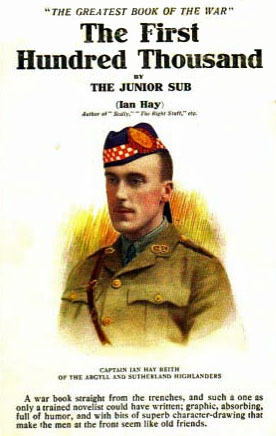
Cover of American edition of The First Hundred Thousand, 1916

On the outbreak of war in 1914, Beith joined the army as a second lieutenant in the Argyll and Sutherland Highlanders. He was in France in April 1915, one of the first 100,000 of Kitchener's Army. In 1915 he married Helen Margaret Speirs, was promoted to captain and was mentioned in dispatches. He compiled a book, published as The First Hundred Thousand. It was assembled with the help of his publisher from a series of articles written for Blackwood's Magazine, describing with wry humour life in his battalion. It became one of the most popular books of the time, with multiple editions in Britain (including a 1940 Penguin paperback) and the US, and was published as Les premiers cent mille in France. The Irish Times called it "a book which was read eagerly not only by the civilian public but also found its way into countless dugouts and redoubts in France, Mesopotamia, Palestine and Salonika."

In 1916, Beith was awarded the Military Cross for his conduct in the Battle of Loos. Later that year, on the strength of the impact The First Hundred Thousand was making in neutral America, Beith was sent to Washington to join the information bureau of the British War Mission. His biographer Patrick Murray writes, "[Beith's] energy and success were rewarded by a CBE (1918) and promotion to the rank of major." While in the US, Beith contributed a series of six long articles to The Times, running to a total of more than 8,000 words. Under the title of "The New America" they described American life and outlook for the better understanding of British readers. The paper commissioned a second series of such articles, published under the collective title "America at War" in March 1918. Unusually for The Times in that period, these articles were signed. (Note: The Times retained a policy of anonymity until 1967. Before that, a by-line was a rare distinction.) The by-line was "Ian Hay"; it was public knowledge that Hay was a pen-name, and that it belonged to Beith, but he chose to go on maintaining a distinction between the author and the soldier.

=== Playwright ===
Following the war Beith continued to write novels, but they did not achieve the great popularity of his earlier books. He became interested in the theatre, and wrote a succession of plays, several of which had notably long runs. The Times remarked that as a playwright Ian Hay was a name to conjure with. Between the First and Second World Wars, Beith had eight plays produced of which he was the sole author, and a further eleven written in collaboration with others. His co-authors were Anthony Armstrong, Guy Bolton, Seymour Hicks, Stephen King-Hall, A E W Mason, Edgar Wallace and P. G. Wodehouse. His longest running plays in the inter-war years were Tilly of Bloomsbury (1919; 414 performances), Good Luck (with Seymour Hicks, 1923; 262 performances), The Sport of Kings (1924; 319 performances) and Housemaster (1936; 662 performances).

Beith was intermittently involved with the cinema. While in the US in 1917 he had served as technical adviser to Cecil B. DeMille on the film The Little American. Between the wars he wrote or co-wrote original screenplays, such as Keep Your Seats, Please (1936); and adapted his own and other authors' works for the screen, including Tommy Atkins (1928), and The 39 Steps (1935). For several more films of the period, Beith's original plays such as The Middle Watch (1930) were adapted by other writers. In all, Beith's work featured in one of these ways in 25 films between 1921 and 1940.

In 1938 Beith published The King's Service, described by The Times as "an attempt to give an informal history of the British infantry soldier in peace and war". Like his novels and plays, the book was published under his customary pen-name. The work so impressed the Secretary of State for War, Leslie Hore-Belisha, that he appointed Beith Director of Public Relations at the War Office. From being a major on the retired list, Beith was given the honorary rank of major-general. He served from November 1938 to January 1941, retiring as he approached his 65th birthday.

=== Last years ===
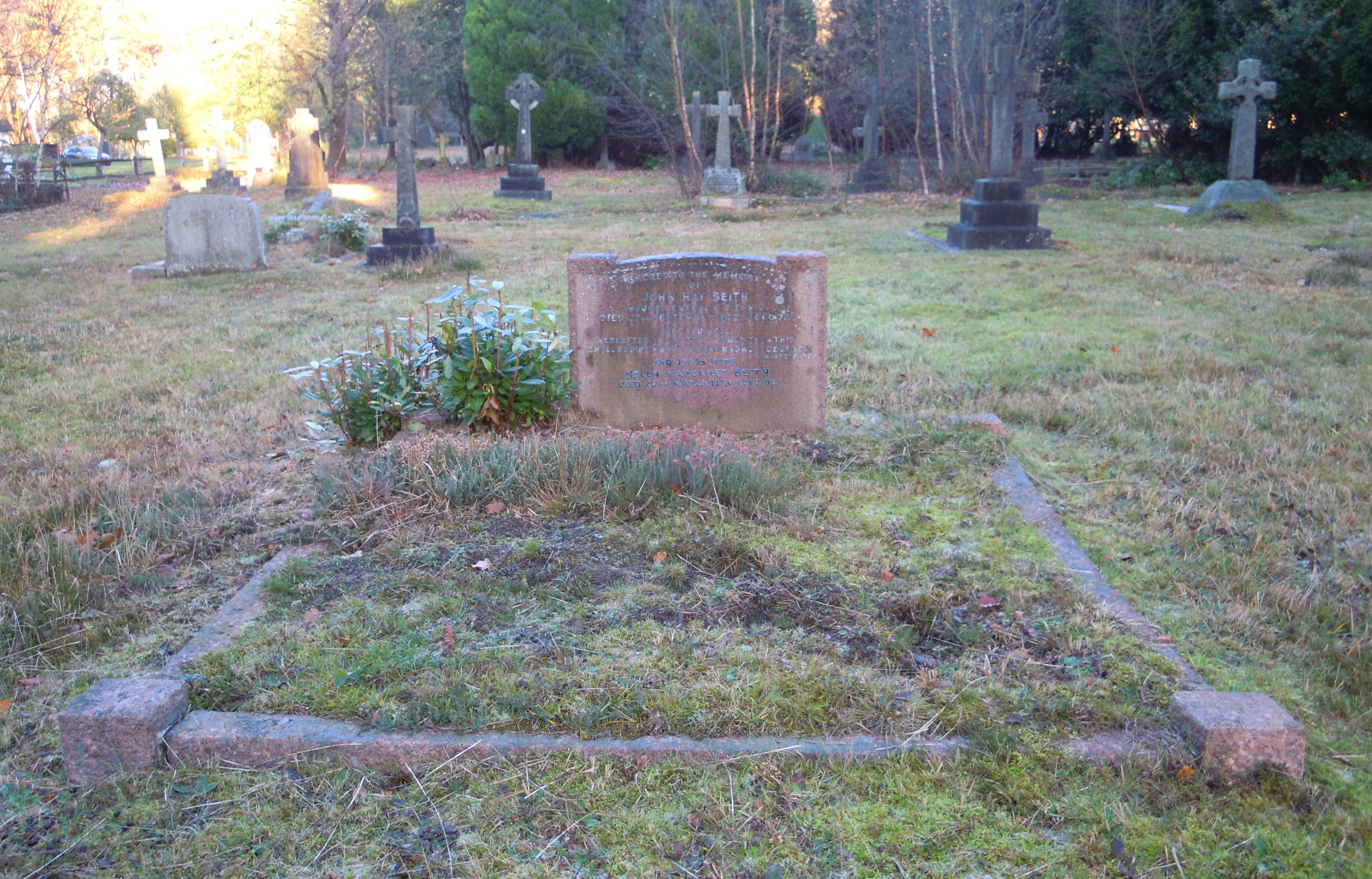
Beith's grave in Brookwood Cemetery

After leaving the War Office, Beith published several volumes of war histories, but his habitual light and witty prose was widely thought unsuited to so grave a subject. In 1947 his only serious play, Hattie Stowe was presented at the Embassy Theatre, Swiss Cottage, London. The play was a biographical study of Harriet Beecher Stowe; it was respectfully reviewed, but made little impact. In the same year he had one of his greatest successes, with Off the Record (co-written with Stephen King-Hall), which ran for 702 performances.

Beith's prose was praised by The Times for "its lightness and deftness". Among his best-known coinages are (from Housemaster) "What do you mean, funny? Funny-peculiar or funny ha-ha?" and (from The First Hundred Thousand) "War is hell, and all that, but it has a good deal to recommend it. It wipes out all the small nuisances of peace-time." He either invented or popularised the phrase "nothing to write home about", denoting something mediocre or unexceptional.

Beith died in the Hillbrow Nursing Home in Liss, on 22 September 1952 after several weeks' illness. His wife outlived him; there were no children of the marriage.

He was buried in Brookwood Cemetery.

== Bibliography ==
=== Books ===
- Pip, 1907
- The Right Stuff, 1908
- A Man's Man, 1909
- A Safety Match, 1911 (illustrated by Frank G. Cootes)
- Happy-Go-Lucky, 1913
- A Knight on Wheels, 1914
- The Lighter Side of School Life, 1914
- Scally: The Story of a Perfect Gentleman, 1915
- The First Hundred Thousand "K (1)", 1915
- Carrying On, 1917
- The Last Million, 1918
- The Willing Horse, 1921
- The Lucky Number, 1923
- The Shallow End, 1924
- Paid in Full, 1925
- Paid With Thanks, 1925
- Half-a-Sovereign, 1926
- The Poor Gentleman, 1928
- The Middle Watch, 1930
- Their Name Liveth, 1931
- The Midshipmaid, 1933
- The Great Wall of India, 1933
- David and Destiny, 1934
- Lucky Dog, 1934
- Housemaster, 1936
- The King's Service, 1938
- Stand at Ease, 1940
- Little Ladyship, 1941
- America Comes Across, 1942
- The Unconquered Isle (Malta, GC), 1943
- The Post Office went to War, 1946
- Peaceful Invasion, 1946
- ROF, the Story of the Royal Ordnance Factories, 1948
- Arms and the Men, 1939–1945
- The History of the King's Bodyguard for Scotland (1676–1950)
- 100 years of Army Nursing, 1953 (published posthumously)
- Cousin Christopher, 1953 (published posthumously)

=== Plays ===
- Tilly of Bloomsbury (1919)
- A Safety Match (1921)
- The Happy Ending (1922)
- Good Luck (1923, with Seymour Hicks)
- The Sport of Kings (1924)
- A Damsel in Distress (1928, with P G Wodehouse)
- Baa, Baa, Black Sheep (1929, with P G Wodehouse)
- The Middle Watch ( 1929, with Stephen King-Hall) (filmed in 1930, 1940 and 1958)
- A Song of Sixpence (1930, with Guy Bolton)
- Leave It to Psmith (1930, with P G Wodehouse),
- Mr Faint-Heart (1931)
- The Midshipmaid (1931, with Stephen King-Hall)
- Orders Are Orders (1932, with Anthony Armstrong)
- A Present from Margate (1933, with A E W Mason)
- Admirals All (1934, with Stephen King-Hall)
- The Frog (1936, from novel by Edgar Wallace),
- Housemaster (1936)
- The Gusher (1937)
- Little Ladyship (1939)
- Off the Record (1947, with Stephen King-Hall)
- Hattie Stowe (1947)
- The White Sheep of the Family (1951, with L. du Garde Peach),

== Notes and references ==
Notes

== Sources ==
- Adcock, Arthur St John (1928). The Glory that was Grub Street – Impressions of Contemporary Authors. London: Sampson. OCLC 756844151.
- Gaye, Freda, ed. (1967). Who's Who in the Theatre (fourteenth ed.). London: Sir Isaac Pitman and Sons. OCLC 5997224.
