= Stephen King-Hall =

British naval officer, writer, and politician (1893–1966)

The Right Honourable The Lord King-Hall of Headley
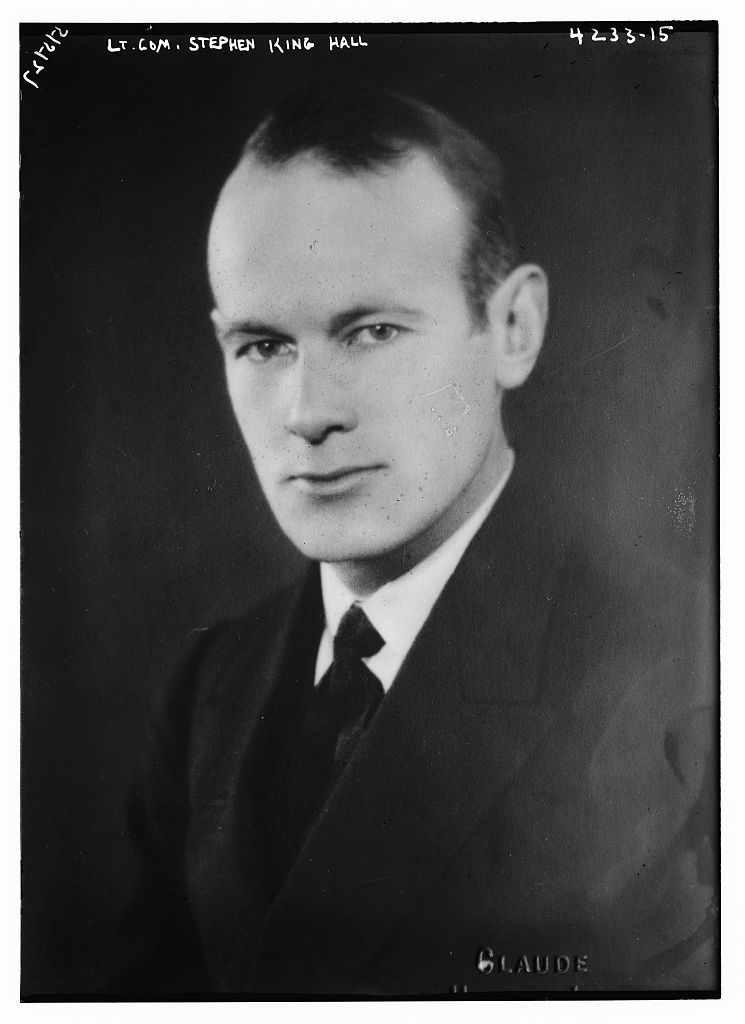
- Stephen King-Hall in 1917

Member of the House of Lords Lord Temporal
- In office 15 January 1966 – 2 June 1966

Member of Parliament for Ormskirk
- In office 27 October 1939 – 15 June 1945
- Preceded by: Samuel Rosbotham
- Succeeded by: Harold Wilson

Personal details
- Born: William Stephen Richard King-Hall; 21 January 1893 London, England
- Died: 2 June 1966 (aged 73) London, England
- Party: Independent; National Labour
- Spouse: Kathleen Spencer (until 1963)
- Relatives: George King-Hall (father)

Military service
- Allegiance: United Kingdom
- Branch/service: Royal Navy
- Years of service: 1914–1929
- Rank: Commander
- Unit: 11th Submarine Flotilla; HMS Southampton

William Stephen Richard King-Hall, Baron King-Hall of Headley (21 January 1893 – 2 June 1966) was a British naval officer, writer, politician and playwright who served as the member of parliament for Ormskirk from 1939 to 1945.

== Early life and career ==
The son of Admiral Sir George Fowler King-Hall and Olga Felicia Ker; theirs was an artistic naval family, King-Hall's sisters Magdalen and Lou also being writers. He married Kathleen Amelia Spencer (died 14 August 1950), daughter of Francis Spencer, on 15 April 1919 and they had three children, Ann, Frances Susan and Jane.

He was educated at Lausanne in Switzerland and at the Royal Naval College, Osborne and Royal Naval College, Dartmouth. He fought in the First World War between 1914 and 1918 with the Grand Fleet, serving on HMS Southampton and 11th Submarine Flotilla. He gained the rank of commander in the service of the Royal Navy in 1928, before retiring in 1929. He wrote several plays between 1924 and 1940, including Posterity accepted by Leonard Woolf for the Hogarth Essays. He joined the Royal Institute of International Affairs in 1929, having previously been awarded their gold medal for his 1920 thesis on submarine warfare.

== Member of Parliament ==
He entered the House of Commons in 1939 as Member of Parliament (MP) for Ormskirk unopposed, standing as the National Labour candidate. He later changed his affiliation and continued to stand as an independent, subsequently losing the seat to future Prime Minister Harold Wilson in the 1945 general election. During his term, he served in the Ministry of Aircraft Production under Max Aitken as Director of the Factory Defence Section.

In 1944 he founded and chaired the Hansard Society to promote parliamentary democracy. He presented a programme for children on current affairs on both BBC radio and television.

== Life after Parliament and death ==
He was invested as a Knight Bachelor on 6 July 1954 and was created a Life Peer as Baron King-Hall of Headley on 15 January 1966. He lived at Hartfield House, Headley until his death in Westminster on 2 June 1966.

== Bibliography ==
=== Political and Historical ===
- A Naval Lieutenant, 1914–1918 as "Etienne"
- Diary of a U-Boat-Commander 1918, as "Etienne", 1918
- Western Civilisation and the Far East, 1924
- Imperial Defence
- The China of To-day
- The War at Sea, 1914–1918
- Submarines in the Future of Naval Warfare, 1920. Thesis.
- Our Own Times, 2 vols, 1935
- A North Sea Diary : 1914-18, Newnes, London, 1936. A "new edition" (minor edits and postscripts) of his earlier A Naval Lieutenant under pseudonym "Etienne".
- London Newsletter (a.k.a. K-H Weekly News Letter Service, National News Letter), 1936.
- Total Victory, 1941
- Britain's Third Chance, 1943
- My Naval Life, Faber and Faber, London, 1952,
- History in Hansard (with Ann Dewar), 1952
- The Communist Conspiracy, 1953
- Letters from Africa, Geoffrey Bles, London, 1957.
- Defence in the Nuclear Age. Gollancz, London, 1958; Nyack, N.Y.: Fellowship, 1959.
- Common Sense in Defence, 1960
- Men of Destiny, 1960
- Our Times, 1900–1960, 1961
- Power Politics in the Nuclear age. Gollancz, London, 1962.

In Defence in the Nuclear Age he advocated a British policy of unilateral nuclear disarmament and national defence involving some reliance on conventional military force. This was to be supplemented by "a defence system of non-violence against violence" - what is often called "defence by civil resistance" or "social defence".

In Men of Destiny he criticised all sides for the creation of the Cold War and further promoted his aim of nuclear disarmament.

There have been several accounts and appraisals of his work advocating unilateral nuclear disarmament and defence by civil resistance.

=== Works for children ===
- Letters to Hilary, 1928
- Hilary Growing Up, 1929, E. Benn, London.
- The crowning of the King and Queen, 1937

"Hilary Growing Up" was described by the author as building "upon the foundations laid down in its predecessor Letters to Hilary. This book is for children from twelve to ninety... a series of essays, or talks... on sociology."

=== Novels ===
- Bunga-Bunga, Nicholson & Watson, 1933
- Moment of No Return, Ballantine Books (No. F543), New York, 1961. A Cold - War novel about tensions between the Soviet Bloc and the West.

=== Plays ===
- Posterity, 1927
- The Middle Watch, 1929
- The Midshipmaid, 1931
- Admirals All, 1934
- Tropical Trouble, 1936
- The Middle Watch, 1940
- Off the Record, 1947
- Girls at Sea, 1958

=== Radio ===
- BBC Children's Hour

== See also ==
- Civil resistance
- Hansard Society
- Nonviolent resistance
- Social defence

Parliament of the United Kingdom
Preceded by Sam Tom Rosbotham	Member of Parliament for Ormskirk; 1939–1945	Succeeded by Harold Wilson
