= Charlesworth at Large =

1958 British TV crime series

- Genre: Police procedural
- Written by: Berkely Mather
- Starring: Wensley Pithey; Tony Church
- Country of origin: United Kingdom
- Original language: English
- No. of series: 1
- No. of episodes: 6

Production
- Producer: John Harrison
- Running time: 30 minutes
- Production company: BBC

Original release
- Network: BBC 1
- Release: 16 August – 20 September 1958

Related
- Mister Charlesworth; Big Guns; Charlesworth

Charlesworth at Large is a British six-part crime drama television series that originally aired on the BBC in 1958. Wensley Pithey revived his role as Detective Superintendent Charlesworth of Scotland Yard which he had played in two previous series. Tony Church took over from Nigel Davenport in the role of Sergeant Spence.

== Selected cast ==
=== Regular ===
- Wensley Pithey as DS Charlesworth
- Tony Church as Sgt Spence
- Edward Higgins as PC Wrothbury

=== Other ===
- Peter Reynolds as The Angel
- Sam Kydd as Lorris
- Joan Hickson as Miss Frisby
- Ian Fleming as Mr Wedlake
- Noel Howlett as The Scribe
- Graham Crowden as Landlord
- John Nettleton as Police Sergeant
- Bernard Kay as Cotter
- William Kendall as Stanley
- Charles Lloyd Pack as Arthur Baker
- Morris Perry as Sergeant Begbie
- Frank Pettingell as Horrobin
- Elsie Wagstaff as Mrs Pawson

== Bibliography ==
- Noble, Peter. British Film and Television Yearbook, Volume 10. British and American Film Press, 1960.
