= Fair Exchange =

Fair Exchange may refer to:

- Fair Exchange (film), a 1936 British film directed by Ralph Ince
- Fair Exchange (TV series), an American television comedy
- "A Fair Exchange", a 1997 episode of the television series Wing and a Prayer
- A Fair Exchange, a 1909 short film by D. W. Griffith - see D. W. Griffith filmography
