= Say It with Diamonds =

Say It with Diamonds may refer to:

- Say It with Diamonds (1927 film), silent film
- Say It with Diamonds (1935 film), British film
