= Alibi (1931 film) =

1931 British film by Leslie S. Hiscott

- Directed by: Leslie S. Hiscott
- Written by: H. Fowler Mear
- Based on: The Murder of Roger Ackroyd; 1926 novel by Agatha Christie; 1928 play by Michael Morton
- Produced by: Julius Hagen
- Starring: Austin Trevor; Franklin Dyall; Elizabeth Allan; John Deverell
- Cinematography: Sydney Blythe
- Music by: John Greenwood
- Production company: Twickenham Film Studios
- Distributed by: Woolf & Freedman Film Service
- Release date: 1931
- Running time: 75 minutes
- Country: United Kingdom
- Language: English

Alibi is a lost 1931 British mystery detective film directed by Leslie S. Hiscott and starring Austin Trevor, Franklin Dyall, and Elizabeth Allan. It was written by H. Fowler Mear adapted from the 1928 play Alibi by Michael Morton, which was in turn based on the 1926 Agatha Christie novel The Murder of Roger Ackroyd.

It was the first of three Poirot adaptations made by Twickenham Film Studios in the 1930s, followed by Black Coffee the same year, and Lord Edgware Dies (1934), all starring Trevor as Poirot.

== Preservation status ==
Alibi is considered to be a lost film. The British Film Institute National Archive holds a collection of stills but no film or video materials.

== Cast ==
- Austin Trevor as Hercule Poirot
- Franklin Dyall as Sir Roger Ackroyd
- Elizabeth Allan as Ursula Browne
- J.H. Roberts as Dr. Sheppard
- John Deverell as Lord Halliford
- Ronald Ward as Ralph Ackroyd
- Mary Jerrold as Mrs. Ackroyd
- Mercia Swinburne as Caryll Sheppard
- Harvey Braban as Inspector Davis
- Clare Greet
- Diana Beaumont as Flora Ackroyd
- Earle Grey

== Reception ==
Film Weekly wrote: Alibi moves with that slightly slow tempo noticeable in many British films. The actors never quite succeed in making one forget that they are merely acting. Franklin Dyall is the exception. There is plenty of mystery and suspense in Alibi, and most people will enjoy it."

The Daily Film Renter wrote: "Plenty of surprise incidents and well-sustained suspense value. Brilliant interpretation of French detective by Austin Trevor; excellent photography and finely recorded. ... Austin Trevor as Hercule Poirot is excellent, as we have already indicated; he is, in fact, just the Poirot one has learned to admire in the book by Agatha Christie. Alibi can only be described as a fine piece of work – it holds, not only for the elucidation of its mystery, but its clear-cut; and decisive action and its big moments of suspense. "
