= Petronella Barker =

Petronella Barker may refer to:

- Petronella Barker (actress, born 1942), British actress
- Petronella Barker (actress, born 1965), British-born Norwegian actress
