= Charlesworth (TV series) =

1959 British TV crime series

- Genre: Police procedural
- Written by: Berkely Mather
- Directed by: Terence Dudley
- Starring: Wensley Pithey; Tony Church
- Country of origin: United Kingdom
- Original language: English
- No. of series: 1
- No. of episodes: 22

Production
- Producers: Terence Dudley; John Warrington; Campbell Logan
- Running time: 30 minutes
- Production company: BBC

Original release
- Network: BBC 1
- Release: 4 April – 5 September 1959

Related
- Mister Charlesworth; Big Guns; Charlesworth at Large

Charlesworth is a British crime drama television series that first aired on BBC in 1959. A police procedural, it starred Wensley Pithey as Detective Superintendent Charlesworth, with Tony Church as Detective Sergeant Spence. It followed on from the previous year's Charlesworth at Large.

Other actors who appeared include Terence Alexander, Alfred Burke, Sheila Burrell, Naomi Chance, George Coulouris, Ina De La Haye, Edward Evans, John Forbes-Robertson, Willoughby Goddard, Jack Hedley, Mary Kerridge, Sam Kydd, Justine Lord, William Mervyn, Norman Mitchell, Lana Morris, Wally Patch, Leslie Perrins, Frank Pettingell, James Raglan, Robert Raglan, Arnold Ridley, Leonard Sachs, Barbara Shelley, Elizabeth Shepherd, Olive Sloane, Josephine Tewson, Austin Trevor, and Patrick Troughton.

== Bibliography ==
- Radio Times, Volume 143. G. Newnes, 1959.
