= Of Human Bondage =

1915 novel by William Somerset Maugham

- First US edition
- Author: W. Somerset Maugham
- Language: English
- Genre: Bildungsroman
- Publisher: William Heinemann
- Publication date: 1915
- Media type: Print, hardback
- Pages: 648
- OCLC: 343641
- Dewey Decimal: 823.912
- LC Class: PR6025.A86 O4 1915

Of Human Bondage is a 1915 novel by W. Somerset Maugham. The novel is generally agreed to be Maugham's masterpiece and to be strongly autobiographical in nature, although he stated, "This is a novel, not an autobiography; though much in it is autobiographical, more is pure invention." Maugham, who had originally planned to call his novel Beauty from Ashes, finally settled on a title taken from a section of Spinoza's Ethics. The Modern Library ranked Of Human Bondage No. 66 on its list of the 100 best English-language novels of the 20th century.

== Plot ==
The book begins with the death of Helen Carey, the beloved mother of nine-year-old Philip Carey. Philip has a club foot and his father has died a few months earlier. Now orphaned, he is sent to live with his aunt and uncle, Louisa and William Carey in Blackstable, a town in Kent.

Philip lives at his uncle's vicarage. Aunt Louisa tries to be a mother to Philip, but his uncle is cold toward him. Philip's uncle has a vast collection of books, and Philip enjoys reading to escape his mundane existence. After less than a year, Philip is sent to a boarding school. His uncle and aunt plan for him to attend Oxford. Philip's disability and sensitive nature make it difficult for him to befriend other pupils. Philip learns that he could earn a scholarship for Oxford, which both his uncle and school headmaster view as wise, but Philip insists on going to Germany.

Philip enjoys life in Germany, residing in a boarding house in Heidelberg with other foreigners. Philip's guardians persuade him to move to London for an apprenticeship. His colleagues there resent him, believing he is a "gentleman". He goes on a business trip with one of his managers to Paris and is inspired to study art in France.

In Paris, Philip attends art classes and makes new friends, including Fanny Price, a poor and determined but talentless art student and a loner. Fanny Price falls in love with Philip, but he does not know and has no such feelings for her. She subsequently dies by suicide.

Of Human Bondage, a 1934 feature film adaptation of the novel

Philip realizes that he will never be a professional artist. He returns to his uncle's house in England to study medicine, his late father's field. He struggles at medical school and meets Mildred, who works as a waitress in a tea shop. He becomes completely infatuated with her, and they date regularly, although she does not show him affection. Mildred tells Philip she intends to marry another man, leaving him heartbroken; Philip subsequently enters into an affair with Norah Nesbit, a kind and sensitive author of penny romance novels. Later Mildred returns, pregnant, and confesses that the man for whom she had abandoned Philip never married her, because he was already married with three children.

Philip breaks off his relationship with Norah and supports Mildred financially, which he can ill afford. To Philip's dismay, after Mildred has her baby, she falls in love with Philip's good friend Harry Griffiths and runs away with him. About a year later, Philip runs into Mildred and, feeling sympathy, takes her in again. Though he no longer loves her, he becomes attached to her baby. When he rejects her sexual advances she becomes angry, destroys most of his belongings, and leaves for ever. In shame, and quickly running out of money, Philip leaves the house for good. He meets Mildred once more, towards the end of the novel, when she summons him for his medical opinion. She is suffering symptoms of syphilis from her work as a prostitute. Philip urges Mildred to give up that life but she declines and exits the plot with her fate unknown.

While working at a hospital, Philip befriends a family man, Thorpe Athelny, who has lived in Toledo, Spain, and is enthusiastically translating the works of St. John of the Cross. Philip invests in mines but is left nearly penniless because of events surrounding the Boer War. Unable to pay his rent, he wanders the streets for several days before the Athelnys take him in and find him a department store job, which he hates. His talent for drawing is discovered and he receives a promotion and an increase in salary, but his time at the department store is short-lived.

After his uncle William dies, Philip inherits enough money to allow him to finish his medical studies and he finally becomes a licensed physician. Philip is temporarily placed as locum with Dr. South, a general practitioner in Dorsetshire. Dr. South is an old, cantankerous physician whose wife is dead and whose daughter is estranged. However, Dr. South takes a shine to Philip's humour and personable nature, eventually offering Philip a partnership in his medical practice. Although flattered, Philip refuses because he plans to visit Spain.

He goes on a small summer holiday with the Athelnys, hop-picking in the Kent countryside. There he finds that one of Athelny's daughters, Sally, likes him. In a moment of romantic abandon one evening they have sex, and when she thinks she is pregnant, Philip decides to marry Sally and accept Dr. South's offer, instead of travelling the world as he had planned. They meet in the National Gallery where, though learning that it was a false alarm, Philip becomes engaged to Sally, concluding that "the simplest pattern – that in which a man was born, worked, married, had children, and died – was likewise the most perfect". He ceases his pursuit of happiness and decides to be content with his lot.

== Title ==
Maugham's initial title was Beauty from Ashes, borrowed from Isaiah 61:3, "... to bestow on them a crown of beauty instead of ashes, the oil of joy instead of mourning, and a garment of praise instead of a spirit of despair"; however, it had already been used. He took the new title from Spinoza. Part IV of his Ethics is entitled "Of Human Bondage, or the Strength of the Emotions" (Latin: De servitute humana seu de affectuum viribus). A free person, says Spinoza, is able to think rationally: but when one is dominated by emotion, rational thought is impossible, and one becomes a slave to the (unthinking) passions. He also defines good and bad categories based on the people's general beliefs, connecting it to their "emotions of pleasure or pain". He defines perfection/imperfection starting out from the desire, in its meaning of particular aims and plans. Philip Carey, the main character in Of Human Bondage, was seeking this very useful end, and became satisfied only after realizing what his aim had been, and having found a person to share this aim with.

== Autobiographical features ==
Maugham had a stammer (instead of a club foot), lost his parents early in life, and was sent to live with his aunt and uncle. He studied medicine and his tastes in literature coincide with those of the main character in this book. Although Maugham was never an artist, he was interested in painting. He possessed in his private collection works by four painters mentioned in the book: Pissarro, Sisley, Monet, and Renoir. In The Summing Up, he discloses that he read Ruskin and became acquainted with many pieces of European art. Maugham wrote an article for Life magazine titled "Painting I Have Liked".

Of Human Bondage is perhaps the most vivid instance of Maugham's inclination towards art. According to Stanley Archer, 33 artists are named in the novel, 10 famous paintings are mentioned by name and many others are referred to. Over half of the named artists were painters whose careers developed primarily in the 19th century. Of these, 13 are French, five are British, and one, Whistler, is American. Eleven were alive at the time in which the plot of the novel is unfolding and five – Carolus-Duran, Degas, Monet, Raffaëlli, and Renoir – were alive when Of Human Bondage was published in 1915.

== In other media ==
=== TV ===
- Of Human Bondage (Studio One) (1949) – starring Charlton Heston adapted by Sumner Locke Elliott
- The book appears in Buffy the Vampire Slayer (Season 4, Episode 1, "The Freshman"). A student (Eddie) at Sunnydale University describes the book as his "safety blanket", as it reflects his own background. The book itself serves as a pivotal clue in the episode, for uncovering the truth behind Eddie's disappearance.

=== Film ===
- Of Human Bondage (1934) – Leslie Howard as Philip and Bette Davis as Mildred
- Of Human Bondage (1946) – Directed by Edmund Goulding, with Paul Henreid and Eleanor Parker in the lead roles
- Of Human Bondage (1964) – Laurence Harvey and Kim Novak in the lead roles
- Seven (1995) – The serial killer John Doe is mentioned to have checked out the book. The lead detective pursuing him in the film is named William Somerset.
- The book appears in the 2017 film Spider-Man: Homecoming, based on Spider-Man, a superhero with a background that resembles Philip's
- The book appears in the animated series Adventure Time: Fionna and Cake. Specifically, Cake is seen reading the book in the fifth episode of the second season.
