= Mannequin (1933 film) =

- Theatrical release poster
- Directed by: George A. Cooper
- Written by: Charles Bennett
- Produced by: Julius Hagen
- Starring: Harold French; Judy Kelly; Diana Beaumont
- Production company: Twickenham Film Studios
- Distributed by: RKO Radio Pictures
- Release date: 5 December 1933
- Running time: 54 minutes
- Country: United Kingdom
- Language: English

Mannequin is a 1933 British drama film directed by George A. Cooper and starring Harold French, Judy Kelly and Diana Beaumont. It was written by Charles Bennnet. Produced as a quota quickie, it was released by the American distributor RKO.

== Synopsis ==
A boxer leaves his true love for another woman but ultimately returns to her.

== Cast ==
- Harold French as Peter Tattersall
- Judy Kelly as Heather Trent
- Diana Beaumont as Lady Diana Savage
- Whitmore Humphreys as Billy Armstrong (as Whitmore Humphries)
- Richard Cooper as Lord Bunny Carstairs
- Ben Welden as Chris Dempson
- Faith Bennett as Queenie
- Vera Bogetti as Nancy
- Anna Lee as Babette
- William Pardue as Armstrong's trainer
- Carol Lees as Binkie
- Toni Edgar-Bruce as Mrs. Mannering

== Production ==
The film was made at Twickenham Studios in London with sets designed by the art director James A. Carter.

== Reception ==
Picturegoer wrote: "In spite of some imaginative and well-detailed direction, this hackneyed story of a prize-fighter whose career is ruined by a society vamp fails to convince or hold the interest to any extent. Diana Beaumont is fair as the vamp, but Whitemore Humphreys is weak as the boxer, as is Harold French as a young millionaire to whom the boxer's erstwhile fiancée had turned when the latter had become infatuated. Judy Kelly is quite attractive as the ingenuous fiancée."

The Daily Film Renter wrote: "Indifferent direction fails to invest plot with any conviction, while boxing interludes are likely to evoke ridicule from patrons with rudimentary knowledge of fistics. Interesting "backstage" shots of fashionable dress salon, and Judy Kelly's heroine are main points of appeal. For uncritical patrons only."
