= Victor Stanley =

British actor (1892–1939)

S. Victor Stanley (1892–27 January 1939) was a British film actor.

Stanley died in Herne Bay on 27 January 1939 at the age of 47.

== Selected filmography ==
- The World, the Flesh, the Devil (1932) - Jim Stanger
- The Iron Stair (1933) - Ben
- The Ghost Camera (1933) - Albert Sims
- Puppets of Fate (1933)
- Timbuctoo (1933) - Henry
- This Week of Grace (1933)
- His Grace Gives Notice (1933) - James Roper
- The House of Trent (1933) - Spriggs
- Three Men in a Boat (1933) - Cockney
- The Umbrella (1933) - Victor Garnett
- The Medicine Man (1933) - Bitoff
- The Four Masked Men (1934) - Potter
- Whispering Tongues (1934) - Ship's Steward
- The Lash (1934) - Jake
- Open All Night (1934)
- School for Stars (1935) - Bill
- Gentlemen's Agreement (1935) - Williams
- Tropical Trouble (1936) - Albert
- Aren't Men Beasts! (1937) - Harry Harper (Last appearance)
