= C. V. France =

British actor (1868–1949)

- Born: Charles V. France; 30 June 1868; Bradford, West Riding of Yorkshire, England, UK
- Died: 13 April 1949 (aged 80); Gerrards Cross, Buckinghamshire, England, UK
- Occupation: Actor
- Years active: 1910–44

Charles Vernon France (30 June 1868 – 13 April 1949) was a British actor, usually credited as C. V. France.

== Stage career ==
France appeared (along with Ralph Richardson) in William Somerset Maugham's 1932 play For Services Rendered: A Play in Three Acts and Maurice Baring's 1912 drama The Grey Stocking: A Play in Four Acts.

France's stage acting was singled out for praise in Maugham's 1938 literary memoir, The Summing Up: "…But there is one actor whom, since he has never reached the rank of a star, and so has hardly received the recognition that he deserves, I should like to mention. This is C. V. France. He has acted in several of my plays. He has never played a part in which he has not been admirable. He has represented to the smallest particular the character that I had in my mind’s eye. It would be difficult to find on the English stage a more competent, intelligent, and versatile actor".

== Complete filmography ==
- The Blue Bird (1910, short) – Time
- Eugene Aram (1924) – Squire Lester
- The Burgomaster of Stilemonde (1929)
- The Loves of Robert Burns (1930) – Lord Farquhar
- The Skin Game (1931) – Mr. Hillcrist – The Hillcrists
- These Charming People (1931) – Minx
- Black Coffee (1931) – Sir Claude Amory
- A Night Like This (1932) – Micky the Mailer
- Lord Edgware Dies (1934) – Lord Edgware
- Royal Cavalcade (1935) – Father
- Scrooge (1935) – Spirit of Christmas Future
- Tudor Rose (1936) – Clergy at Execution (uncredited)
- Broken Blossoms (1936) – High Priest
- Crime Over London (1936) – (uncredited)
- Victoria the Great (1937) – Archbishop of Canterbury
- A Yank at Oxford (1938) – Dean Snodgrass
- Strange Boarders (1938) – Col. Lionel Anstruther
- If I Were King (1938) – Father Villon
- The Ware Case (1938) – Judge
- Cheer Boys Cheer (1939) – Tom Greenleaf
- Ten Days in Paris (1940) – General de Guermantes
- Night Train to Munich (1940) – Admiral Hassinger
- Breach of Promise (1942) – Morgan
- Went the Day Well? (1942) – Mr Ashton, the vicar
- The Halfway House (1944) – Mr. Truscott, Solicitor
- It Happened One Sunday (1944) – Magistrate (final film role)
