= Lord Edgware Dies (film) =

- Austin Trevor as Poirot and Richard Cooper as Hastings
- Directed by: Henry Edwards
- Written by: H. Fowler Mear
- Based on: Lord Edgware Dies; 1933 novel by Agatha Christie
- Produced by: Julius Hagen
- Starring: Austin Trevor; Jane Carr; Richard Cooper; John Turnbull
- Cinematography: Sydney Blythe
- Edited by: Michael C. Chorlton
- Music by: William Trytel
- Production company: Twickenham Film Studios
- Distributed by: Radio Pictures
- Release date: August 1934
- Running time: 80 minutes
- Country: United Kingdom
- Language: English

Lord Edgware Dies is a 1934 British mystery film directed by Henry Edwards and starring Austin Trevor, Jane Carr, and Richard Cooper. It was written by H. Fowler Mear based on the 1933 Agatha Christie novel Lord Edgware Dies.

Trevor reprised his role as Hercule Poirot for a third time, having previously played him in Alibi and Black Coffee, both released in 1931. Like them, it was filmed at Twickenham Film Studios. While the two earlier films are now lost, this production still survives.

During Julius Hagen's tenure at Twickenham, the studios had specialised in production of murder mysteries as quota quickies. Although Hagen undoubtedly had ambitions for this film to be a more prestigious production, with a larger budget, the similarities to the studio's more routine output led most cinemas to show it as a second feature. The film's sets were designed by the art director James Carter.

== Synopsis ==
Hercule Poirot is hired by Lady Edgware, an American actress, who wants him to arrange a divorce from her aristocratic husband. In fact it turns out that Lord Edgware has already agreed to a divorce, only for him to be murdered the same night.

== Cast ==
- Austin Trevor as Hercule Poirot
- Jane Carr as Lady Edgware
- Richard Cooper as Captain Hastings
- John Turnbull as Inspector Japp
- Michael Shepley as Captain Roland Marsh
- Leslie Perrins as Bryan Martin
- C. V. France as Lord Edgware
- Kynaston Reeves as Duke of Merton
- Phyllis Morris as Alice
- Sophie Stewart as Miss Geraldine Edgware

== Reception ==
Kine Weekly wrote: "Although the acting is competent, tedium is not avoided; too much verbiage and the lateness of the ending rob it of real surprise. Fair average programme picture for the masses. ... This picture is not just a screen adaptation of Agatha Christie's novel; it is a literal translation, and it is here where its weakness lies. Had the producer substituted wherever possible action for dialogue, the picture would have been a real hair-raiser; as it is it is just another conventional mystery play."

The Daily Film Renter wrote: "Main entertainment derives from detective's deductions, and perspicacity in face of apparently unshakable alibis of bunch of suspects. Good technical details, and smart staging. Austin Trevor takes honours in lead, Richard Cooper supplying characteristic humour."
