= Call the Gun Expert =

1964 British TV crime series

- Genre: Police procedural
- Written by: Macdonald Hastings
- Directed by: Jack Gold
- Starring: Wensley Pithey
- Narrated by: Macdonald Hastings
- Country of origin: United Kingdom
- Original language: English
- No. of series: 1
- No. of episodes: 6

Production
- Producer: Jack Gold
- Running time: 30 minutes
- Production company: BBC

Original release
- Network: BBC 1
- Release: 2 July – 6 August 1964

Call the Gun Expert is a British crime television series which first aired on BBC 1 in 1964. It consisted of a single series of six episodes featuring Wensley Pithey as Robert Churchill, a ballistics expert who solves a number of crimes based on real-life historical cases. Pithey frequently starred in police procedurals, and was well known to audiences for his role as Detective Superintendent Charlesworth. The scripts were written by journalist Macdonald Hastings who also narrated he series.

== Cast ==
- Wensley Pithey as Robert Churchill
- Macdonald Hastings as Narrator(voice)
- Petronella Barker as Bella Wright
- David Swift as Counsel
- Norman Mitchell as Manager
- Robert Cawdron as PC Gutteridge
- Paddy Joyce as Kennedy
- Desmond Cullum-Jones as Salesman
- Kenneth Benda as Bernard Spilsbury
- Billy McComb as Chung Lin Soo
- John Gatrell as Sir Edward Marshall Hall
- Alan Rolfe as Uncle

== Bibliography ==
- Pitts, Michael R. Famous Movie Detectives III. Scarecrow Press, 2004.
