= The Crooked Lady =

1932 British film by Leslie S. Hiscott

- Austin Trevor and Isobel Elsom in the film
- Directed by: Leslie S. Hiscott
- Written by: H. Fowler Mear
- Based on: novel The Crooked Lady by William S. Stone
- Produced by: Julius Hagen
- Starring: George Graves; Isobel Elsom; Austin Trevor
- Production company: Real Art Productions
- Distributed by: Metro-Goldwyn-Mayer (UK)
- Release date: March 1932 (UK)
- Running time: 75 minutes
- Country: United Kingdom
- Language: English

The Crooked Lady is a 1932 British drama film directed by Leslie S. Hiscott and starring George Graves, Isobel Elsom, Ursula Jeans and Austin Trevor. It was written by H. Fowler Mear based on the novel of the same title by William S. Stone. A quota quickie, it was filmed at Twickenham Studios.

== Plot ==
Ex-army Captain James Kent is out of work, and gets involved with a gang of thieves, but decides to go straight when he falls in love with lady detective Joan Collinson.

== Cast ==
- George Graves as Sir Charles Murdoch
- Isobel Elsom as Miriam Sinclair
- Ursula Jeans as Joan Collinson
- Austin Trevor as Captain James Kent
- Alexander Field as Slim Barrett
- Edmund Willard as Joseph Garstin
- S. J. Warmington as Inspector Hilton
- Frank Pettingell as Hugh Weldon
- Moore Marriott as Crabby
- Henry B. Longhurst as John Morland
- Paddy Browne as Susie

== Preservation status ==
The British Film Institute National Archive holds no stills or ephemera, and no film or video materials.

== Reception ==
Film Weekly wrote: "An unusual and quite entertaining British mixtare of crook melodrama and Cockney comedy. Much of the film's appeal depends on the performances of a really noteworthy cast. George Graves has little to do as the foppish baronet, but whenever he gets a chance he extracts the maximum of comedy from the minimum of opportunity. Ursula Jeans is quite delightful as the lady detective, Alexander Field contributes a very good study of a Cockney crook, and Austin Trevor acts smoothly as the officer turned thief."

Kine Weekly wrote: "A thoroughly sound British melodrama livened with Cockney humour and very well acted and produced. It should go down with practically any audience, the stars' performances, though of the thumbnail variety, affording an additional box-office pull."

The Daily Film Renter wrote: "Excellent comedy-drama of ex-officer who becomes a crook, but goes straight when he finds that he has robbed widow of man who lost his life in saving his (the officer's) life. A good thrill, on somewhat old-fashioned lines, and good dialogue, together with a good comedy characterisation by Alexander Field, are features of a picture which will score direct hit everywhere."

Picturegoer wrote: "The main points of interest in this picture, which opens very well, but later becomes rather overburdened with dialogue, are the appearance of George Graves and some good characterisations both of a serious and a comedy nature."
