= George A. Cooper (director) =

British film director and screenwriter (1894–1947)

George A. Cooper (1894–1947) was a British screenwriter and film director.

== Partial filmography ==
- The Shadow of Evil (1921)
- His Wife's Husband (1922)
- Geraldine's First Year (1922)
- Darkness (1923)
- The Man Who Liked Lemons (1923).
- Three to One Against (1932)
- The Eleventh Commandment (1924)
- Claude Duval (1924)
- Settled Out of Court (1925)
- Somebody's Darling (1925)
- If Youth But Knew (1926)
- The Further Adventures of the Flag Lieutenant (1927)
- His Rest Day (1927) short film made in Phonofilm sound-on-film process
- The Coffee Stall (1927) short film made in Phonofilm, starring Mark Lupino (1894-1930)
- Nan Wild (1927) short film made in Phonofilm, featuring Nan Wild
- Olly Oakley (1927) short film made in Phonofilm, featuring Olly Oakley
- The World, the Flesh, the Devil (1932)
- The Roof (1933)
- I Lived with You (1933)
- The Man Outside (1933)
- The Shadow (1933)
- Puppets of Fate (1933)
- Home, Sweet Home (1933)
- His Grace Gives Notice (1933 film)
- The Black Abbot (1934)
- The Case for the Crown (1934)
- Sexton Blake and the Bearded Doctor (1935)
- Royal Eagle (1936)
- Men Without Honour (1939)
- Down Our Alley (1939)
- Loyal Heart (1946)
- What Do We Do Now? (1946, writer)
