= Ursula Jeans =

English actress (1906–1973)

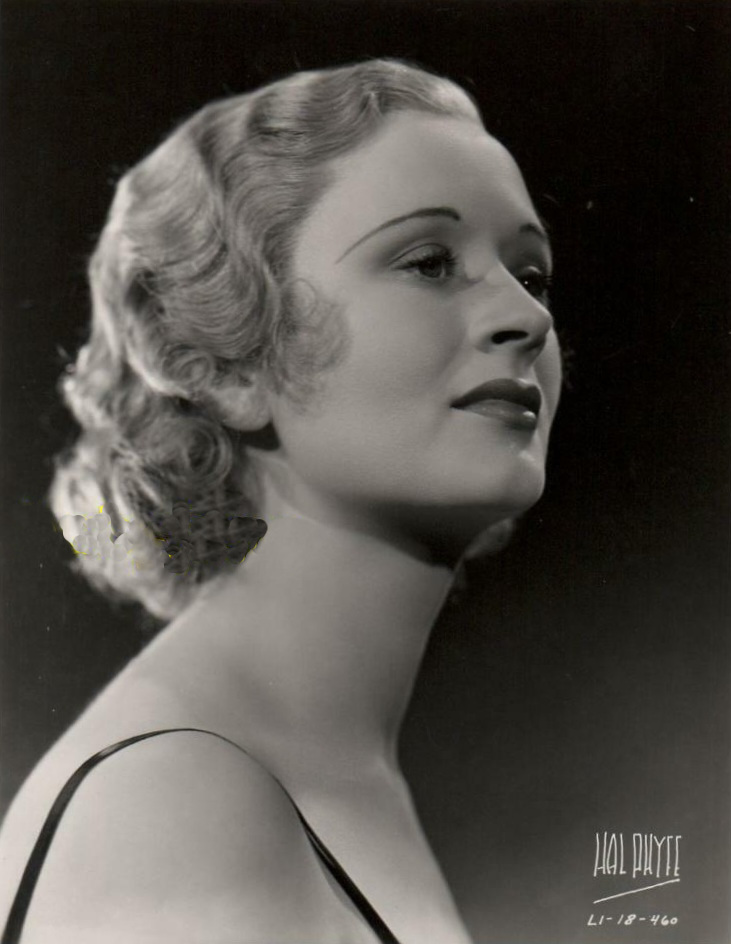
- Jeans in 1933
- Born: Ursula Jean McMinn; 5 May 1906; Simla, British India
- Died: 21 April 1973 (aged 66); London, England, United Kingdom
- Occupation: Actress
- Years active: 1922–1968
- Spouses: Robin Irvine (m. 1930; died 1933) Roger Livesey (m. 1937)

Ursula Jean McMinn (5 May 1906 – 21 April 1973), better known as Ursula Jeans, was an English film, stage, and television actress.

== Biography ==
Jeans was born in Simla, British India, to English parents. She was brought up and educated in London. She was the youngest of three siblings. Her brother Desmond Jeans was a boxer and actor, and her elder sister, Isabel, was also an actress. In 1931 she appeared in Edward Knoblock's Grand Hotel at the Adelphi Theatre.

Jeans made her stage debut in London in 1922, before joining the cast of the London production of The Play's the Thing, an adaptation by P. G. Wodehouse of Ferenc Molnár's play The Play at the Castle. The cast included Gerald du Maurier, Ralph Nairn, Henry Daniell (before he went to Hollywood), and Henry Forbes-Robertson.

She made her stage debut in New York in 1933. Her first marriage was to actor Robin Irvine (1931–1933 until his death). Her second marriage was to actor Roger Livesey from 1937 until her death. (Livesey's sister Maggie was already married to Desmond Jeans.) She appeared in one film with Livesey, The Life and Death of Colonel Blimp (1943). She entertained troops with ENSA during World War II, sometimes working with her husband. They appeared on stage together in Watch on the Rhine, Ever Since Paradise, and Uncertain Joy. After the war, she continued acting, including starring as Mrs. Tarlton, in one of the eight episodes of the BBC's H M Tennant's Globe Theatre, in 1956; and, in a stage tour of Australia and New Zealand, between 1956 and 1958.

== Last years and death ==
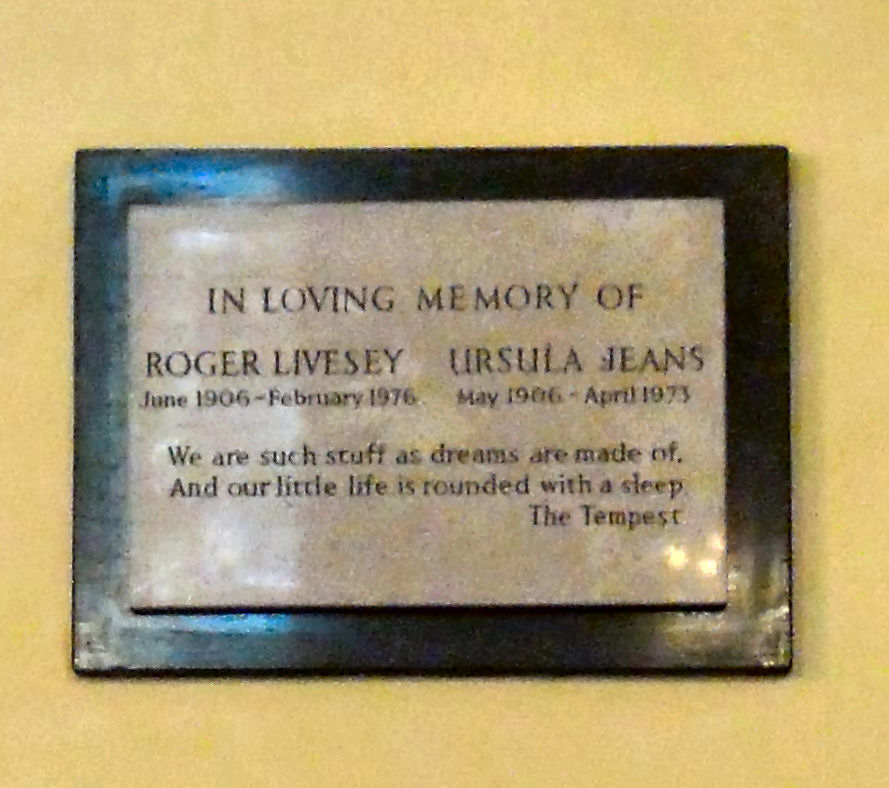
Memorial plaque in St Paul's in Covent Garden to Jeans and her husband Roger Livesey

Jeans made one appearance each in Dixon of Dock Green, in 1967, as Mrs. Regan; in Theatre 625, as Mother Denis, in 1968; and as Ursula Benton, in The Root of All Evil?, also in 1968. She continued to act into the 1970s.

Jeans died of cancer in 1973, aged 66, about 18 months after her diagnosis. She shares a memorial plaque with her second husband, Roger Livesey, in the actors' church St Paul's, Covent Garden.

== Partial filmography ==
- A Gipsy Cavalier (1922) – Minor Role (uncredited)
- The Virgin Queen (1923) – Minor Role (uncredited)
- The Fake (1927) – Maid
- Quinneys (1927) – Mabel Dredge
- The Passing of Mr. Quin (1928) – Vera, the Maid
- S.O.S. (1928) – Lady Weir
- The Love Habit (1931) – Rose Pom Pom
- The Flying Fool (1931) – Morella Arlen
- The Crooked Lady (1932) – Joan Collinson
- Once Bitten (1932) – Clare
- The Barton Mystery (1932) – Ethel Standish
- Cavalcade (1933) – Fanny Bridges
- On Thin Ice (1933) – Lady Violet
- I Lived with You (1933) – Gladys Wallis
- Friday the Thirteenth (1933) – Eileen Jackson
- The Man in the Mirror (1936) – Veronica
- Dark Journey (1937) – Gertrude
- Storm in a Teacup (1937) – Lisbet Skirving
- Over the Moon (1939) – Millie
- The Life and Death of Colonel Blimp (1943) – Frau von Kalteneck
- Mr. Emmanuel (1944) – Frau Heinkes
- Gaiety George (1946) – Isobel Forbes
- The Woman in the Hall (1947) – Lorna Blake
- The Weaker Sex (1948) – Martha Dacre
- That Dangerous Age (1949) – Minor role
- Seven Women (1953) – Leonora – (Short)
- The Night My Number Came Up (1955) – Mrs. Robertson
- The Dam Busters (1955) – Mrs. Wallis
- North West Frontier (1959) – Lady Windham
- The Green Helmet (1961) – Mrs. Rafferty
- The Queen's Guards (1961) – Mrs. Fellowes
- A Question of Fact (1962) – Grace Smith
- Boy with a Flute (1964, Short)
- The Battle of the Villa Fiorita (1965) – Lady Anthea (final film role)
