= Ever Since Paradise =

1946 play by J. B. Priestley

- Written by: J.B. Priestley
- Original language: English
- Genre: Comedy

Premiere
- Date premiered: 19 August 1946
- Place premiered: Lyceum Theatre, Sheffield

Ever Since Paradise is a 1946 comedy play by the British writer J.B. Priestley.

It premiered at the Lyceum Theatre in Sheffield in August 1946. The following June it transferred to the New Theatre in London's West End where it ran for 165 performances. The cast included Jane Carr, Joy Shelton, Roger Livesey, Ursula Jeans and Dennis Arundell.

== Bibliography ==
- Wearing, J.P. The London Stage 1940-1949: A Calendar of Productions, Performers, and Personnel. Rowman & Littlefield, 2014.
