= Wensley Pithey =

South African actor (1914–1993)

- Born: 21 June 1914; Cape Town, South Africa
- Died: 10 November 1993 (aged 79); London, England
- Occupation: Actor
- Notable work: Sunday Night Theatre

Wensley Ivan William Frederick Pithey (21 June 1914 – 10 November 1993) was a South African-British character actor who had a long stage and film career.

== Biography ==
Pithey was born in Cape Town, South Africa. A graduate of the University of Cape Town where he studied music and drama, he travelled to Britain in 1947. He appeared in various Shakespearean roles in his long career (memorably as Sir Toby Belch) and appeared in Eugene O'Neill's Anna Christie. He also directed and produced plays in the West End and appeared in a range of roles on television including the 1976 drama Edward and Mrs Simpson (as Winston Churchill – a role he also played in the miniseries Ike) and Special Branch and Poldark. His British television appearances included Danger Man (1961) among others. He also played the title role of Detective Superintendent Charlesworth in a number of BBC series including Charlesworth at Large (1958) and its sequel Charlesworth the following year. In 1964 he played a ballistics expert in the BBC series Call the Gun Expert.

Between 1961 and 1976, Pithey appeared in German TV commercials as a fake coffee expert for Tchibo.

== Filmography ==
=== Film ===
- The Mark of Cain (1947) as Opera House Attendant (uncredited)
- London Belongs to Me (1948) as First Warden
- It's Hard to Be Good (1948) as Vicar (uncredited)
- Cardboard Cavalier (1949) as Jailer
- Your Witness (1950) as Alfred
- Guilt Is My Shadow (1950) as Tillingham
- The Woman's Angle (1952) (uncredited)
- Brandy for the Parson (1952) as Circus Owner
- Father's Doing Fine (1952) as Policeman (uncredited)
- Lady in the Fog (1952) as Sid - the Barman
- The Titfield Thunderbolt (1953) as A Policeman
- The Diamond (1954) as Springwell Police Sergeant (uncredited)
- The Men of Sherwood Forest (1954) as Hugo
- Isn't Life Wonderful! (1954) as Sam
- You Can't Escape (1956) as Constable Wagstaff
- Tiger in the Smoke (1956) as Detective Sergeant Pickett
- Doctor at Large (1957) as Sam - Poacher
- Kill Me Tomorrow (1957) as Inspector Lane
- Hell Drivers (1957) as Pop
- The Long Haul (1957) as Minor Role
- Blue Murder at St Trinian's (1957) as Brigadier (uncredited)
- Serious Charge (1959) as Police Sergeant
- Make Mine Mink (1960) as Superintendent (uncredited)
- The Pure Hell of St Trinian's (1960) as Chief Constable
- Snowball (1960) as Jim Adams
- The Barber of Stamford Hill (1962) as Mr. O
- The Boys (1962) as Mr. Coulter
- The Knack ...and How to Get It (1965) as Teacher
- Oliver! (1968) as Dr. Grimwig
- Oh! What a Lovely War (1969) as Archduke Franz Ferdinand (uncredited)
- One of Our Dinosaurs Is Missing (1975) as Bromley
- The Saint and the Brave Goose (1979) as Franklyn
- Red Monarch (1983) as Voroshilov
- White Mischief (1987) as Sheridan
- American Friends (1991) as Cave

== Television ==
- Little Women (1950–1951) as Mr. James Laurence
- Midshipman Barney (1951) as Snarks
- Sunday Night Theatre (1951–1957) as Multiple roles
- Robin Hood (1953) as Friar Tuck
- Wednesday Theatre (1953) as Tom Pascoe
- A Castle and Sixpence (1954) as Mr. Parsons
- The Gentle Falcon (1954) as Innkeeper
- End of the Line (1956) as Narrator (BBC short film, broadcast August 15th.)
- Fabian of the Yard (1956) as Jerry Watson
- David Copperfield (1956) as Captain Mercier Mr. Tungay
- Play of the Week (1956–1967) as Multiple roles
- Assignment Foreign Legion (1957) as Captain Mercier
- Overseas Press Club – Exclusive! (1957) as Father Tsouderos
- Mister Charlesworth (1957) as Det. Chief Insp. Charlesworth
- Nicholas Nickleby (1957) as Vincent Crummles
- Shadow Squad (1957) as Inspector Smith
- Big Guns (1958) as Det. Supt. Charlesworth
- Caxton's Tales (1958) as Mortimer Benson
- The Diary of Samuel Pepys (1958) as Viscount Brouncker
- The Firm of Girdlestone (1958) as Dr. Dimsdale
- The New Adventures of Charlie Chan (1958) as James Collins
- Ivanhoe (1958) as Earl of Pembroke
- Charlesworth at Large (1958) as Det. Supt. Charlesworth
- Armchair Theatre (1958–1960) as Multiple roles
- The Last Chronicle of Barset (1959) as Mr. Walker
- Charlesworth (1959) as Det. Supt. Charlesworth
- Probation Officer (1960) as Mr. Moffat
- Yorky (1960) as Fred Piggott
- The Larkins (1960) as George Potter
- Somerset Maugham Hour (1960) as Willem
- Persuasion (1960–1961) as Mr. Musgrove
- No Hiding Place (1961) as Joe Smith
- Dixon of Dock Green (1961) as Paul Wigram
- Danger Man (1961) as Senor Lazar
- Here's Harry (1961) as Police Chief
- Boyd Q.C. (1961) as Mr. Wodhurst
- Deadline Midnight (1961) as Frederick Hall
- Sir Francis Drake (1961) as Davey Preston
- Jacks and Knaves (1961) as Chief Inspector
- BBC Sunday-Night Play (1961) as Col. Von Schwendi
- Zero One (1962) as Unknown role
- The Scales of Justice (1962) as Mr. Robbins
- Playbox (1962–1963) as Barrington Blizard, QC
- Suspense (1963) as Bradwell
- Man of the World (1963) as President Ruschek
- The Saint (1963) as Insp. Claude Teal
- Teletale (1963) as Prof. Bür-Malottke
- The Plane Makers (1964) as Bill Ingram
- Sergeant Cork (1964) as Bill Ingram
- Call the Gun Expert (1964) as Robert Churchill
- Love Story (1964) as Jack Wightman
- Gideon's Way (1964) as Supt. Bill Hemmingway
- The Airbase (1965) as Mr. Swearingen
- The Sullavan Brothers (1965) as Corcoran
- Blackmail (1965) as Eric Palmer
- Mrs Thursday (1966) as George Dunrich
- City '68 (1967–1968) as Alderman Sankey
- Her Majesty's Pleasure (1968) as Governor
- Callan (1969) as Det. Insp. Charwood
- Special Branch (1969) as Det. Supt. Eden
- Nearest and Dearest (1970) as Leonard Longbottom
- The Main Chance (1970) as Lord Bennett
- Doomwatch (1972) as Dr. Ericson
- The Adventurer (1972) as Nicholas
- Coronation Street (1972–1974) as Wilfred Perkins
- Sykes (1973) as Multiple roles
- Zodiac (1974) as Inspector Duggan
- Poldark (1975) as Jeffrey Clymer
- Beasts (1976) as Mr. Liversedge
- Premiere as Chief Insp. Lymington
- The Devil's Crown (1978) as Saladin
- Edward and Mrs. Simpson (1978) as Winston Churchill
- Return of the Saint (1979) as Franklyn
- Ike (1979) as Winston Churchill
- The Old Curiosity Shop (1979–1980) as The Single Gentleman
- The Gentle Touch (1982) as Dr. Quesne
- Number 10 (1983) as Edward VII
- Love and Marriage (1984) as Owen Merrick
- Howards' Way (1986) as George Johnson
- In Sickness and in Health (1987) as Equerry
- Blind Justice (1988) as Sir Charles Bingham
- Lipstick on Your Collar (1993) as Elderly Gentleman
