= Morland Graham =

British actor (1891–1949)

- Born: David Hugh Graham; 8 August 1891; Partick, Scotland
- Died: 8 April 1949 (aged 57); Chiswick, London, England
- Occupation: Film actor
- Years active: 1934–1949
- Spouse: Elsie Cole (m. 1926)

Morland Graham (8 August 1891 – 8 April 1949) was a British film actor.

Graham had a career on the stage spanning over 35 years. He was known as a character actor, but also wrote a one act comedy, C'est la Guerre, which was first performed in October 1926 and subsequently at the following year's Scottish Community Drama Festival.

Graham became best known for his film roles in Jamaica Inn (1939), Old Bill and Son (1941) and Bonnie Prince Charlie (1948), in which he starred after deputising for actor Will Fyffe. He appeared as the Biffer in Whisky Galore! which was released after his death.

Graham married Elsie Cole (née Press) in 1926. He died on 8 April 1949 after taking an overdose of aspirin while suffering from ill health and, according to his wife, "nervous depression". He had recently turned down an offer of stage work from Alistair Sim because he "did not feel up to it".

== Filmography ==
Year	Title	Role	Notes
1934	What Happened to Harkness?	Billy	
1934	The Private Life of Don Juan	Hector, Don Juan's Cook	
1934	The Scarlet Pimpernel	Treadle (the tailor)	
1935	Man of the Moment	Mr. Rumcorn	
1935	Moscow Nights	Brioukow's Servant	
1935	Get Off My Foot	Major Rawlingcourt	
1936	Whom the Gods Love	Minor Role	Uncredited
1936	Twelve Good Men	Victor Day	
1936	Where's Sally?	Polkinhome	
1936	Fair Exchange	Dr. Franz Schmidt	
1937	I, Claudius	Halotus, master of Livia's household	
1939	Q Planes	Captain of the Viking	Uncredited
1939	Jamaica Inn	Sea Lawyer Sydney	
1939	Inspector Hornleigh on Holiday	Griggle	Uncredited
1940	Full Speed Ahead	Gordon Tweedie	
1940	Night Train to Munich	Teleferic Attendant	
1941	Freedom Radio	Father Landbach	
1941	Old Bill and Son	Old Bill	
1941	The Ghost Train	Dr. Sterling	
1941	This England	Doctor	
1941	Tower of Terror	Harbour Master Kleber	
1941	Ships with Wings	C.P.O.Marsden	
1942	The Big Blockade	Civil Service	
1942	The Young Mr. Pitt	Minor Role	Uncredited
1943	The Shipbuilders	Danny Shields	
1944	Medal for the General	Bates	
1944	Henry V	Sir Thomas Erpingham	
1946	Gaiety George	Morris	
1947	The Upturned Glass	Clay	
1947	The Brothers	Angus McFarish	
1948	Esther Waters	Ketley	
1948	Bonnie Prince Charlie	Donald MacDonald	
1949	Whisky Galore!	The Biffer	(final film role)
