= Timbuctoo (film) =

1933 film by Walter Summers and Arthur B. Woods

- Henry Kendall in the film
- Directed by: Walter Summers; Arthur B. Woods
- Written by: Walter Summers
- Produced by: Walter Summers
- Starring: Henry Kendall; Margot Grahame
- Cinematography: James Wilson
- Music by: Idris Lewis
- Distributed by: British International Pictures
- Release date: April 1933
- Running time: 72 minutes
- Country: United Kingdom
- Language: English

Timbuctoo (also known as Timbucktoo) is a 1933 British comedy film, co-directed by Walter Summers and Arthur B. Woods for British International Pictures, and starring Henry Kendall and Margot Grahame. It was written by Summers.

Although BIP had a reputation for churning out films quickly and cheaply, in this case they allocated enough of a budget to finance location filming in Africa.

== Plot ==
The film's slight storyline concerns a man who has a violent quarrel with his family over his fiancée. Feeling totally upset, he wants to get away from all the conflict and decides to travel overland to Timbuktu with its legendary reputation as one of the most remote and mysterious places in the world. As soon as his fiancée learns of his departure, she vows to do the same thing and challenges herself to arrive in Timbuktu before him. Much of the film is essentially taken up with travelogue sequences of African natives and habitats.

The film contains a sequence of a pygmy hippopotamus being hunted and killed.

== Cast ==
- Henry Kendall as Benedict
- Margot Grahame as Elizabeth
- Emily Fitzroy as Aunt Augusta
- Hubert Harben as Uncle George
- Jean Cadell as Wilhelmina
- Victor Stanley as Henry
- Una O'Connor as Myrtle
- Edward Cooper as Steven

== Reception ==
Film Weekly wrote: "Exceptionally interesting African scenes grafted onto a farcical story about a young man who is told to go to Timbuktu – and does. The native cast run away with the honours, but Henry Kendall, Jean Cadell, and Victor Stanley are outstanding among the British players. Unusual entertainment with a definite novelty appeal."

Kine Weekly wrote: "This African travel comedy is original and a new idea is effectively expolited: the settings and detail are authentic but it is inclined to run to length, and would be enormously improved by cutting. Comedy and interest are not equally balanced, and the elimination of some of the travel and animal stuff would enhance the quality of the entertainment. ... The wild dancing of the natives is spectacular, and the catching of small children on sword points is most thrilling and makes an exciting break in the slender narrative. The killing of a baby hippo, however, is rather revolting, and its elimination would help to throw out the comedy in better perspective."

The Daily Film Renter wrote: "Combination of travelogue with light comedy, centred round overland trek through jungle, with novel and interesting shots of native customs. Fine jungle scenery, with occasional shots of desert. Curious contrast of Henry Kendall's sophisticated brand of humour with savagery of surroundings. Rather unpleasant killing of pigmy hippopotamus with spears, and native cabaret staged in jungle village. Fair light entertainment."

== Availability ==
The film is available to view by appointment at any of the Mediatheques run by the British Film Institute.
