= Vera Bogetti =

English film actress (1902–1985)

- Vera Bogetti
- Born: Vera Josephine Boggetti; 5 October 1902; Wandsworth, London, England, United Kingdom
- Died: 10 October 1985 (aged 83); Godstone, Surrey, England, United Kingdom
- Other names: Vera Josephine Boggetti; Vera Josephine Rickards
- Years active: 1933-1948
- Spouse: Laurence J. Rickards (1925-1953) (his death)
- Children: Pauline (1931-1932)

Vera Josephine Boggetti (5 October 1902 – 10 October 1985) was a British stage and film actress. She married Laurence J. Rickards in Hampstead, London in 1925, and the couple had a daughter, Pauline, in 1931, who died as an infant in 1932. Laurence died in 1953. She was born in Wandsworth, London and died in Godstone, Surrey.

== Career ==
She left school to go straight into the cast of John Barrymore's Hamlet at the Haymarket Theatre in London. She played in many Leslie Henson farces on stage. Her first film was Mannequin.

== Partial filmography ==
- Mannequin (1933)
- Borrow a Million (1934)
- The Life of the Party (1934)
- To Be a Lady (1934)
- Crazy People (1934)
- Seeing Is Believing (1934)
- Get Off My Foot (1935)
- Inside the Room (1935)
- Handle with Care (1935)
- Say It with Diamonds (1935)
- Excuse My Glove (1936)
- Eliza Comes to Stay (1936)
- Everything in Life (1936)
- Intimate Relations (1937)
- The Singing Cop (1938)
- Special Edition (1938)
- Confidential Lady (1939)
- Two for Danger (1940)
- The Prime Minister (1941)
- Thursday's Child (1943)
- Candles at Nine (1944)
- It's in the Bag (1944)
- No Room at the Inn (1948)
