= Enter the Queen =

1930 film

- Directed by: Arthur Varney
- Written by: Brock Williams
- Starring: Richard Cooper; Chili Bouchier; Percy Walsh
- Edited by: Charles Saunders
- Production company: Starcraft
- Distributed by: Fox Film Company
- Release date: November 1930
- Running time: 42 minutes
- Country: United Kingdom
- Language: Silent

Enter the Queen is a 1930 British silent short comedy film directed by Arthur Varney and starring Richard Cooper, Dora March, Chili Bouchier and Percy Walsh.

It was made at Beaconsfield Studios as a quota quickie for distribution by Fox Film.

== Bibliography ==
- Chibnall, Steve. Quota Quickies: The Birth of the British 'B' Film. British Film Institute, 2007.
- Low, Rachael. Filmmaking in 1930s Britain. George Allen & Unwin, 1985.
- Wood, Linda. British Films, 1927-1939. British Film Institute, 1986.
