= The Umbrella (film) =

- Kay Hammond and Harold French in the film
- Directed by: Redd Davis
- Written by: H. Fowler Mear; Laurence Meynell
- Produced by: Julius Hagen
- Starring: Kay Hammond; Harold French; Victor Stanley
- Cinematography: Ernest Palmer
- Production company: Real Art Productions
- Distributed by: RKO Pictures
- Release date: 1933
- Running time: 56 minutes
- Country: United Kingdom
- Language: English

The Umbrella is a 1933 British comedy film directed by Redd Davis and starring Kay Hammond, Harold French and Victor Stanley. It was written by H. Fowler Mear based on the novel by Laurence Meynell, and was made as a quota quickie at Twickenham Studios.

== Premise ==
After being released from prison, two incompetent crooks allow the umbrella with their stolen valuables stashed away in it to be carried off by someone else. A series of confusions ensue as they desperately try to recover the missing umbrella.

== Cast ==
- Kay Hammond as Mabel
- Harold French as Freddie Wallace
- Victor Stanley as Victor Garnett
- Dick Francis as Michael Frankenstein
- Barbara Everest as Mrs. Wynne
- Kathleen Tremaine as Mary Wynne
- John Turnbull as Governor
- Syd Crossley as Police Constable
- Ernest Mainwaring

== Reception ==
Kine Weekly wrote: "The situations are agreeably absurd, and the players make the most of the modest opportunities. A quota film which, by reason of its convenient length and clean fun, can be useful. ... The story has quite a bright idea behind it, and ingenious economy and lively team work combine to exploit it fairly successfully. Although the fun is not exactly fast and furious, it nevertheless has sufficient tempo to secure satisfactory results."

The Daily Film Renter wrote: "Action on slow side, but occasionally ingenious gags, bright performance by Kay Hammond, and well-staged masked ball sequence help to hold the interest. Romantic side-issue brings film to satisfactory conclusion. Acceptable second feature for popular halls."
