= Home, Sweet Home (1933 film) =

1933 film

- Feature on the film from Picture Show (24 February 1934)
- Directed by: George A. Cooper
- Written by: Terence Egan; H. Fowler Mear
- Produced by: Julius Hagen
- Starring: John Stuart; Marie Ney; Richard Cooper
- Production company: Real Art Productions
- Distributed by: RKO Radio Pictures
- Release date: 1933
- Running time: 74 minutes
- Country: United Kingdom
- Language: English

Home, Sweet Home is a 1933 British drama film directed by George A. Cooper and starring John Stuart, Marie Ney and Richard Cooper. It was written by Terence Egan and H. Fowler Mear, and made at Twickenham Studios as a quota quickie for release by RKO Pictures.

== Preservation status ==
The British Film Institute National Archive holds a collection of ephemera and stills but no film or video materials.

== Plot ==
About to return home on leave, mining engineer Richard Pelham discovers that his wife Constance plans to leave him for John Falkirk. By the time he gets home Constance has reconsidered, and has gone to tell Falkirk, who is waiting for her at a hotel. Richard arrives there, and accidentally kills John. Constance realises that she can only save Richard from a manslaughter sentence if she admits to marital misconduct. She does so, and Richard is released.

== Cast ==
- John Stuart as Richard Pelham
- Marie Ney as Constance Pelham
- Richard Cooper as Tuprnan
- Sydney Fairbrother as Mrs. Bagshow
- Cyril Raymond as John Falkirk
- Eve Becke as Betty Marlin
- Eliot Makeham as James Merrick
- Felix Aylmer as Robert Wilding KC
- Ben Welden as Santos
- Joan Carter
- Barbara Everest

== Reception ==
Kine Weekly wrote: "The sentiments are rather torced, and unnecessary directorial acrobatics tend a prolong the development without emphasising the purpose and moral of the plot. Moderate dramatic booking for the masses, the strong selling angles of which are the box-office title and strong cast. ... The director, George A. Cooper, employs every known modern device, such as spoken thoughts montage and symbolism to heighten the emotional appeal of the story, but its transparent artifice makes his task difficult."

The Daily Film Renter wrote: "Ingredients do not completely convince, but sincere acting of Marie Ney and John Stuart holds interest, while Old Bailey trial is well suggested in series of flashes."

Picture Show wrote: "Home-sweet-homely sentiment is exploited here – the erring repentant wife, the anguished husband arriving back after lonely years abroad to find his wife has left him only their little daughter to greet him, and the harrowing events before the reconciliation. It has been sympathetically handled and competently acted."
