= The Medicine Man (1933 film) =

1933 film

- Frank Pettingell (right) in the film
- Directed by: Redd Davis
- Written by: Michael Barringer; H. Fowler Mear; Terence Egan; Robert Edmunds
- Produced by: Julius Hagen
- Starring: Claud Allister; Frank Pettingell; Pat Paterson
- Cinematography: Ernest Palmer
- Edited by: Lister Laurance
- Music by: William Trytel
- Production company: Real Art Productions
- Distributed by: RKO Radio Pictures
- Release date: August 1933
- Running time: 52 minutes
- Country: United Kingdom
- Language: English

The Medicine Man is a 1933 British comedy film directed by Redd Davis and starring Claud Allister, Frank Pettingell, Pat Paterson and Ben Welden. It was written by Michael Barringer, H. Fowler Mear, Terence Egan and Robert Edmunds, and produced at Twickenham Studios as a quota quickie for distribution by the American company RKO Pictures. The film's sets were designed by the art director James A. Carter.

== Plot ==
Freddie Wiltshire is hard-up and idiotic young man. He agrees, for a fee, to impersonate his friend, Dr. Wesley Primus, who needs an alibi. Among his various comedic misadventures as a "doctor", Freddie ends up in court, testifying regarding a drunken reveller, who turns out to be his hypocritical temperance-espousing father-in-law, and in another incident is captured by gunmen.

== Cast ==
- Claud Allister as Hon. Freddie Wiltshire
- Frank Pettingell as Amos Wells
- Pat Paterson as Gwendoline Wells
- Ben Welden as Joe Garbel
- Jeanne Stuart as Flossie
- Viola Compton as Mrs. Wells
- George Mozart as Sir Timothy Rugg
- Drusilla Wills as Boadicea Briggs
- Ronald Simpson as Dr. Wesley Primus
- Victor Stanley as Bitoff
- Syd Crossley as commissionaire
- Andreas Malandrinos as hotel manager
- Betty Astell as patient
- John Turnbull as Police Inspector

== Reception ==
Film Weekly wrote: "A weak and vulgar British farce. It lacks the excuse of real, robust, humour, depending largely on suggestive jokes and verty broad 'gags' for its few laughs."

Kine Weekly wrote: "Farcical entertainment, a pot-pourri of comedy, crime and romance, splashed with fruity quips. The development is not too even, but the robust comedy of Frank Pettingell and good team work keep the lively spirit of the fooling at an even strength. ... Every conceivable device is employed to keep the entertainment bright, and the hectic melange is staged on quite an extravagant scale. Many of the gags border on the suggestive, and the dialogue is fruity, but the broadness of the humour is seasoned to the taste of the masses."

Picturegoer wrote: "Broad stuff this with gags here and there which come very near the knuckle. ... Claude Allister is in good form as the 'silly ass,' and Frank Pettingell is very good as a hypocritical temperance reformer."
