= Mister Charlesworth =

British television series

- Genre: Police procedural
- Written by: Berkely Mather
- Starring: Wensley Pithey; Nigel Davenport
- Country of origin: United Kingdom
- Original language: English
- No. of series: 1
- No. of episodes: 6

Production
- Producer: Peter Lambert
- Running time: 30 minutes
- Production company: BBC

Original release
- Network: BBC 1
- Release: 4 September – 9 October 1957

Related
- Big Guns; Charlesworth at Large; Charlesworth

Mister Charlesworth is a British television six-part crime drama that originally aired on the BBC in 1957. It is a police procedural featuring Detective Chief Inspector Charlesworth investigating crime around London's Soho. It was followed by several sequels featuring Charlesworth, beginning with Big Guns the following year.

== Cast ==
=== Main ===
- Wensley Pithey as DCI Charlesworth
- Nigel Davenport as Sgt Spence
- Edward Higgins as PC Wrothbury
- Anna Burden as Alice Charlesworth
- John Nettleton as Police Constable

=== Other ===
Actors who appeared in individual episodes of the series included Michael Caine, Wilfrid Brambell, Ralph Nossek, Erik Chitty, Frank Middlemass, Cyril Shaps and Donovan Winter.

== Bibliography ==
- Radio Times, Volume 137. G. Newnes, 1957.
