= Gaiety George =

- Directed by: George King; Leontine Sagan
- Written by: Peter Creswell; Richard Fisher; Katherine Strueby; Basil Woon
- Produced by: George King
- Starring: Richard Greene; Ann Todd; Peter Graves; Hazel Court
- Cinematography: Otto Heller
- Edited by: Hugh Stewart
- Music by: Jack Beaver; Eric Rogers
- Production company: Embassy Pictures
- Distributed by: Warner Brothers
- Release date: 2 July 1946
- Running time: 98 minutes
- Country: United Kingdom
- Language: English

Gaiety George (also known as Showtime) is a 1946 British historical musical film directed by George King and Leontine Sagan and starring Richard Greene, Ann Todd and Peter Graves. It was written by Peter Creswell, Richard Fisher, Katherine Strueby and Basil Woon and is set in the late Victorian music hall, when an Irish impresario arrives in London.

The film was inspired by the memory of George Edwardes.

== Cast ==
- Richard Greene as George Howard
- Ann Todd as Katharine Davis
- Peter Graves as Henry Carter
- Morland Graham as Morris
- Hazel Court as Elizabeth Brown
- Charles Victor as Danny Collier
- Jack Train as Hastings
- Leni Lynn as Florence Stevens
- Ursula Jeans as Isobel Forbes
- Daphne Barker as Miss de Courtney
- Maire O'Neill as Mrs. Murphy
- Frank Pettingell as Grindley
- Phyllis Robins as Chubbs
- John Laurie as McTavish
- Frederick Burtwell as Jenkins
- Anthony Holles as Wade
- David Horne as Lord Mountsbury
- Patrick Waddington as Lt. Travers
- Claud Allister as Archie
- Graeme Muir as Lord Elstown
- Evelyn Darvell as Maisie
- Paul Blake as Lord Royville
- John Miller as Rosie
- Richard Molinas as Laurient
- Gerhard Kempinski as Muller
- Wally Patch as a commissionaire
- Carl Jaffe as kommandant
- Everley Gregg as landlady
- Roger Moore as a member of the audience
- Hugh Morton as King (on stage)
- Maxwell Reed as Prince (on stage)

== Reception ==
The Monthly Film Bulletin wrote: "Director King demonstrates again his ability to build in a wealth of detail and give it the authenticity of a well-told romance. In narrative imagery the aspiration here evident will, no doubt, grow in clarity and conciseness. ... In a competent cast Leni Lynn steals honours with her acrobatically fluent high notes in singing. Greene has a convincing charm and a well-resstrained Irish bearing. Ann Todd, as wife and mother, brings that sympathy which keynotes the sweet sentiment of this piece."

Kine Weekly wrote: "Older filmgoers may regret the absence of some of the best-known Edwardes tunes, and many of the leading stars of yesterday go unmentioned. Happily, the younger generation of picturegoers, those who represent the great majority, will not suffer similar qualms. They will accept the film for what it is, a friendly period musical comedy drama, and enjoy it. Even so, the picture is a warning to all producers and directors not to start something they can't finish. The question of copyright and performing rights is the snag, and it prevents the film from being good biography as well as colourful light entertainment"

Picturegoer wrote: "The best thing to do when viewing this picture is to forget that it was originally presented as being based on the life of the famous Edwardian impressario, George Edwardes; you will hear none of the numbers which made his musical comedies from San Toy to The Merry Widow, a success. On the other hand, director George King has managed to capture some of the spirit of the period, both melodically, and in atmosphere. He has not succeeded in interesting us very much in his characters with, perhaps, the exception of a captious newspaper critic, played by Peter Graves. ... Ann Todd is not at all well photographed, as his leading lady who becomes his wife. Richard Greene is good as George Howard, but too tightly saddled with an Irish accent. Leni Lynn sings well, but is also handicapped by indifferent photography, as a leading lady."
