= The Four Masked Men =

Four Masked Men
- Feature on the film in Picture Show (18 August 1934)
- Directed by: George Pearson
- Screenplay by: H. Fowler Mear
- Produced by: Julius Hagen
- Starring: John Stuart; Judy Kelly; Miles Mander
- Production company: Twickenham Film Studios
- Release date: 13 August 1934
- Running time: 79 minutes
- Country: United Kingdom
- Language: English

The Four Masked Men (also known as Behind the Masks) is a 1934 British crime film directed by George Pearson and starring John Stuart, Judy Kelly and Richard Cooper. It was adapted by H. Fowler Mear from the play The Masqueraders by Cyril Campion.

== Plot ==
Trevor Phillips is a young barrister determined to avenge the murder of his brother Arthur. When he discovers that an old friend, Rodney Fraser, is a member of the masked gang responsible for the murder, with Fraser's assistance he finds the killer, who turns out to be his fiancée's uncle.

== Cast ==
- John Stuart as Trevor Phillips
- Judy Kelly as Patricia Brent
- Miles Mander as Rodney Fraser
- Richard Cooper as Lord Richard Clyne
- Athole Stewart as Colonel St. John Clive
- Sebastian Shaw as Arthur Phillips
- Victor Stanley as Potter

== Reception ==
Kine Weekly wrote: "Crime drama, the story of which is suggestive of an Edgar Wallace thriller, but rather lacks its craftsmanship. There does remain, however, much in the characterisation to sustain interest, and it is the good individual acting, coupled with excellent staging, that enables the film to hold suspense, develop a strong and intriguing hint of romance, and cater for lively thrills."

The Daily Film Renter wrote: "Logical story, strong in suspense values, moving briskly to genuine surprise denouement. Effective acting by cast of familiar British players, and direction well timed to mix comedy with drama."

Picture Show wrote: "The story, as is the case in so many thrillers, is a bit fantastic, but the director is to be congratulated for making impossible situations quite convincing. The cast is good."
