= Excess Baggage (1933 film) =

1933 film

- Maud Gill and Frank Pettingell in the film.
- Directed by: Redd Davis
- Written by: H. Fowler Mear; H. M. Raleigh (novel)
- Produced by: Julius Hagen
- Starring: Claud Allister; Frank Pettingell; Sydney Fairbrother; Rene Ray
- Cinematography: Sydney Blythe
- Production company: Real Art Productions
- Distributed by: RKO Pictures
- Release date: March 1933
- Running time: 59 minutes
- Country: United Kingdom
- Language: English

Excess Baggage is a 1933 British comedy film directed by Redd Davis and starring Claud Allister, Frank Pettingell, Sydney Fairbrother, Rene Ray, Gerald Rawlinson and Viola Compton. It was written by H. Fowler Mear based on the novel by H. M. Raleigh, and made at Twickenham Studios in west London as a quota quickie for distribution as a second feature by RKO Pictures.

Its plot concerns a British army Colonel mistakenly who thinks he has killed his superior officer while hunting down a ghost.

== Plot ==
Colonel Murgatroyd breaks a bottle over the head of his Commanding Officer, Major General Booster, and thinks he has killed him. He takes the body, locked in a trunk, to a country resort, Mudflats-on-Trym, where Major Booster comes to life, and a series of comedic adventures ensue.

== Cast ==
- Claud Allister as Colonel Murgatroyd, R.S.V.P.
- Frank Pettingell as Major General Booster, S.O.S.
- Sydney Fairbrother as Miss Toop
- Rene Ray as Angela Murgatroyd
- Gerald Rawlinson as Clive Worthington
- Viola Compton as Martha Murgatroyd
- O. B. Clarence as Lord Grebe
- Maud Gill as Duchess of Dillwater
- Finlay Currie as Inspector Toucan

== Reception ==
Film Weekly wrote: "An absurd British farce – so absurd that it almost looks like one of America's 'nonsense' films, or extract from a Crazy Month af music hall. The fun is rather labored, however, and the probable entertainment value likely to depend entirely on personal taste."

The Daily Film Renter wrote: "The story in this film is of little moment, merely serving as a slender framework for numerous gags that appeal by virtue of their inherent nonsensicality. ... Claude Allister takes the acting honors with his clever 'silly ass' study in the role of Murgatroyd, while Viola Compton helps to get the laughs as his ultra-cool wife, Frank Pettingell as the pompous C. O. Rene Ray as the heroine, Finlay Currie as the detective, and Sydney Fair-brother as a coy schoolmistress all do well. ... The gags are of the 'crazy' variety, and even if they are, at times, naive to a degree, they have the merit of compelling laughter."

Picture Show wrote: "This comedy makes no pretence to be anything but amusingly absurd. ...There are plenty of laughs."
