= In a Monastery Garden (film) =

1932 film

- Trade Show advertisement from Kine Weekly, 10 March 1932
- Directed by: Maurice Elvey
- Written by: Michael Barringer (dialogue); H. Fowler Mear (story)
- Produced by: Julius Hagen
- Starring: John Stuart; Hugh Williams; Alan Napier
- Cinematography: Basil Emmott
- Edited by: Lister Laurance
- Music by: W.L. Trytel
- Production company: Julius Hagen Productions
- Distributed by: Associated Producers & Distributors (UK); S. & G. Films (US)
- Release date: 11 March 1932 (UK); (London)
- Running time: 81 minutes
- Country: United Kingdom
- Language: English

In a Monastery Garden is a 1932 British drama film directed by Maurice Elvey and starring John Stuart, Hugh Williams, Alan Napier, and Frank Pettingell. It was written by Michael Barringer and H. Fowler Mear.

== Synopsis ==
An Italian musician begins to steal his brother's compositions after he is jailed for shooting a prince.

== Cast ==
- John Stuart as Michael Ferrier
- Hugh Williams as Paul Ferrier
- Alan Napier as Count Romano
- Dino Galvani as Cesare Bonelli
- Frank Pettingell as Bertholdi
- Humberston Wright as Abbot
- Gina Malo as Nina
- Joan Maude as Roma Romano
- Marie Rambert Dancers as Les Sylphides
- Antony Tudor choreographer
- Margaret Emden
- Alexander Scott-Gatty

== Production ==
It was made at Twickenham Studios in London with sets were designed by the art director James Carter.

== Critical reception ==
The Daily Film Renter wrote: "Careful artistic production, with many clever directorial touches, creating definite atmosphere. Rather sombre, and story drags occasionally, but has powerful moments and holds interest and sympathy. Sound artistic production worthy of a popular reception despite rather sedate air."

Film Weekly wrote: "Slowness of development mititgates against the sentimental appeal of this unusual but rather dull picture ... Those who do not insist on slickness and speed may, therefore, be able to find entertainment of an unusual type in the production."

Kine Weekly wrote: "A pleasing drama which, apart from a certain slowness in the development, represents excellent entertainment for all but the most sophisticated audience. ... Both the atmosphere and the acting are good, and plenty of local colour as well as appropriate music is introduced into the presentation."

The New York Times concluded "dullish is the word."
