= Big Guns (TV series) =

1958 British TV crime series

- Genre: Police procedural
- Written by: Berkely Mather
- Directed by: Gerard Glaister
- Starring: Wensley Pithey; Nigel Davenport
- Country of origin: United Kingdom
- Original language: English
- No. of series: 1
- No. of episodes: 6

Production
- Producer: Gerard Glaister
- Running time: 30 minutes
- Production company: BBC

Original release
- Network: BBC 1
- Release: 1 January – 5 February 1958

Related
- Mister Charlesworth; Charlesworth at Large; Charlesworth

Big Guns is a British six-part crime drama television series that originally aired on the BBC in 1958. The show was based on the character of Detective Superintendent Charlesworth, played by Wensley Pithey, who had featured a previous series Mister Charlesworth and would go on to appear further series including Charlesworth at Large and Charlesworth.

== Selected cast ==
=== Main ===
- Wensley Pithey DS Charlesworth
- Nigel Davenport as Sgt Spence
- Walter Fitzgerald as J Philimore Sparkes
- Anthony Baird as PC Wrothbury
- Carl Bernard as Milton
- Warren Mitchell as Kegworthy
- Anna Burden as Alice Charlesworth

=== Guest ===
- Frank Finlay as Roscoe
- Sam Kydd as Raikes
- Danny Green as Bronner
- Donald Churchill as Taffy Wilkes
- Wendy Craig as Rita
- Sydney Bromley as Engraver
- Frederick Jaeger as Ni Ni Blascoe
- Leslie Perrins as Cloker
- Anthony Sagar as Jakey Selsby
- Alfred Lynch as Dancer

== Bibliography ==
- Radio Times, Volume 138. G Newnes, 1958.
- Noble, Peter. British Film and Television Year Book, Volume 9. 1959.
