= Isla Bevan =

British actress (1908–1976)

Isla Mary Bevan (née Foster; 26 October 1908 – 19 July 1976) was a British stage and film actress.

== Filmography ==
Sourced from the British Film Institute Collections Search.

- Nine till Six (1932)
- The Sign of Four (1932)
- The Face at the Window (1932)
- The Star Reporter (1932)
- The World, the Flesh, the Devil (1932)
- The Sign of Four (1932)
- Puppets of Fate (1933)
- Fair Exchange (1936)
