= Full Speed Ahead (1940 film) =

1940 film

- Directed by: John Hunt
- Written by: L. DeCosta Ricci
- Produced by: John Hunt
- Starring: Frederick Peisley; Dinah Sheridan; Morland Graham
- Cinematography: W. Winterton
- Production companies: Education & General Services
- Distributed by: General Film Distributors
- Release date: 19 October 1940
- Running time: 64 minutes
- Country: United Kingdom
- Language: English

Full Speed Ahead is a 1940 British drama film directed by John Hunt and starring Frederick Peisley, Dinah Sheridan and Morland Graham. It was filmed at Cricklewood Studios in London. A second feature, it was distributed by General Film Distributors on a double bill with The Man in the Iron Mask.

== Synopsis ==
Two brothers undergo respective apprenticeships. One joins the Royal Navy while the other becomes a ship designer, working on a new destroyer.

== Cast ==
- Michael Osler as John Elwood
- Frederick Peisley as Michael Elwood
- Dinah Sheridan as Joan Barrymore
- Morland Graham as Gordon Tweedie
- H.G. Stoker as Sir Robert Barrymore
- Betty Shale as Mrs. Elwood

== Bibliography ==
- Chibnall, Steve & McFarlane, Brian. The British 'B' Film. Palgrave MacMillan, 2009.
- Wood, Linda. British Films, 1927-1939. British Film Institute, 1986.
