= Richard Cooper (actor) =

British actor (1893–1947)

- Born: 16 July 1893; Harrow-on-the-Hill; London; United Kingdom
- Died: 18 June 1947 (aged 53)
- Years active: 1930–1941

Richard Cooper (16 July 1893 – 18 June 1947) was a British actor who starred in twenty eight films between 1930 and 1941. He was born in Harrow-on-the-Hill in 1893. He started his stage work as a comedy actor in 1913 before later graduating to films.

Cooper played Captain Hastings in the 1930s series of Hercule Poirot films. He worked frequently with the director Leslie S. Hiscott for whom he made his screen debut in The House of the Arrow.

== Filmography ==
- The House of the Arrow (1930)
- At the Villa Rose (1930)
- The Last Hour (1930)
- Lord Richard in the Pantry (1930)
- Kissing Cup's Race (1930)
- Enter the Queen (1930)
- Bed and Breakfast (1930)
- The Officers' Mess (1931)
- Rodney Steps In (1931)
- Black Coffee (1931)
- The Other Mrs. Phipps (1932)
- Once Bitten (1932)
- The First Mrs. Fraser (1932)
- Double Dealing (1932)
- Home, Sweet Home (1933)
- Mannequin (1934)
- The Four Masked Men (1934)
- The Black Abbot (1934)
- Lord Edgware Dies (1934)
- Annie, Leave the Room! (1935)
- The Ace of Spades (1935)
- Three Witnesses (1935)
- That's My Uncle (1935)
- The Angelus (1937)
- Stepping Toes (1938)
- Alf's Button Afloat (1938)
- Shipyard Sally (1939)
- Inspector Hornleigh Goes To It (1941)
