= The Gold of Malabar =

1967 novel

- First edition
- Author: Berkely Mather
- Language: English
- Genre: Thriller
- Publisher: Collins
- Publication date: 1967
- Publication place: United Kingdom
- Media type: Print

The Gold Of Malabar is a 1967 thriller novel by the British writer Berkely Mather. Mather had made his name as a novelist with his 1960 work The Pass Beyond Kashmir which, like The Gold of Malabar, was set in the Indian subcontinent.

While in jail in Goa for manslaughter, merchant seaman Michael O’Reilly discovers the location of buried treasure off the Bombay coast and escapes from prison in order to hunt for it.

== Bibliography ==
- Pine, John C. 199 Ways to Review a Book: A Librarian's Readings in the Novel of the Sixties. Scarecrow Press, 1971.
- Reilly, John M. Twentieth Century Crime & Mystery Writers. Springer, 2015.
