= Once Bitten (1932 film) =

1932 British comedy film

- Dino Galvani, Frank Pettingell and Jeanne Stuart in the film
- Directed by: Leslie S. Hiscott
- Written by: Michael Barringer; John Barrow; H. Fowler Mear
- Produced by: Julius Hagen
- Starring: Richard Cooper; Ursula Jeans; Frank Pettingell
- Cinematography: Sydney Blythe
- Production company: Real Art Productions
- Distributed by: Fox Film
- Release date: March 1932
- Running time: 47 minutes
- Country: United Kingdom
- Language: English

Once Bitten is a 1932 British comedy film directed by Leslie S. Hiscott and starring Richard Cooper, Ursula Jeans and Frank Pettingell. It was written by Michael Barringer, John Barrow and H. Fowler Mear, and was made at Twickenham Studios as a quota quickie.

== Preservation status ==
The British Film Institute National Archive holds a collection of stills but no film or video materials.

== Plot ==
A man disappears after thinking he has killed a man who was blackmailing his son-in-law. The son-in-law, who could clear the man, loses his memory.

== Cast ==
- Ursula Jeans as Clare
- Richard Cooper as Toby Galloway
- Frank Pettingell as Sir Timothy Blott
- Jeanne Stuart as Alicia
- Dino Galvani as Mario Fideli
- Sydney King as Jerry
- Anthony Holles as Legros
- Kathleen Kelly as Anne

== Reception ==
Kine Weekly wrote: "A breezy British comedy, a trifle blue perhaps in its humour, which, thanks to the robust comicalities of the North Country comedian, Frank Pettingell, provides good fun for the majority of audiences. ... The story, built round the star, is quite good, and it leads to a riotous mix-up, the disentanglement of which gives play to hearty, irresponsible fooling."

The Daily Film Renter wrote: "Clever performance of Richard Cooper and Frank Pettingell and fair quota of amusing situations make film thoroughly entertaining second for average audiences. ... Although stagey in construction, the film is full of humorous moments. Frank Pettingell's broad Yorkshire comedy and accent make the baronet an interesting character."
