= Claud Allister =

English actor (1888–1970)

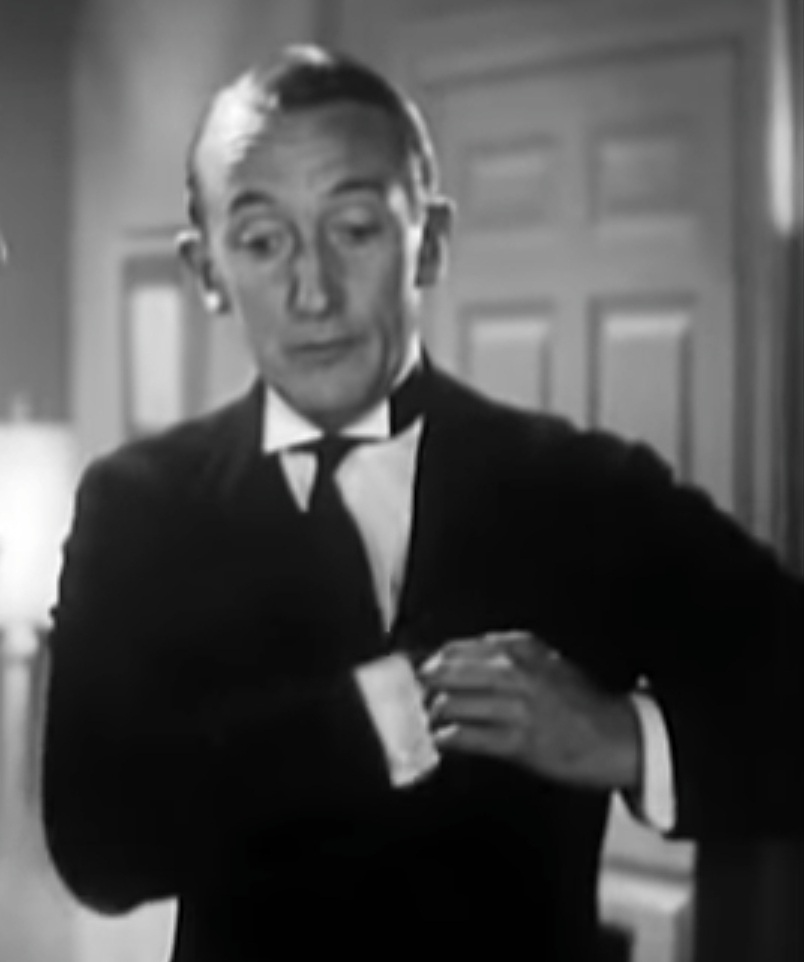
- Allister in Lady Luck (1936)
- Born: William Claud Michael Palmer; 3 October 1888; London, England
- Died: 26 July 1970 (aged 81); Santa Barbara, California, U.S.
- Occupation: Actor
- Years active: 1929–1955
- Spouses: Daisy Isabel Douglas Overed (aka Dorothy Overed) (m. 1914, divorced) Barbara Fay (divorced): Gwen Dowling

Claud Allister (born William Claud Michael Palmer, 3 October 1888 – 26 July 1970) was an English actor with an extensive film career in both Britain and Hollywood, where he appeared in more than 70 films between 1929 and 1955.

== Life and career ==
He was born in London. After receiving his education at Felsted School in Essex, he began his career as a stockbroker's clerk in the City of London, but gave up a life in the Square Mile on deciding that he preferred the stage, upon which he made his début in 1910.

He toured England's repertory theatres playing minor parts up to the outbreak of World War I, when he was commissioned into the British Army as a subaltern, and saw active service with the Suffolk Regiment and the Machine Gun Corps.

Post-war he returned to acting, appearing in the West End in Bulldog Drummond, and in 1924 went to America to perform on the stage there initially. In 1929 he made his film début in The Trial of Mary Dugan. In 1934 he appeared in the West End in the historical play Mary Read.

Allister died on 26 July 1970 at Santa Barbara, California, aged 81.

== Filmography ==
- The Trial of Mary Dugan (1929) as Henry James Plaisted
- Bulldog Drummond (1929) as Algy
- Charming Sinners (1929) as Gregson
- Three Live Ghosts (1929) as Spoofy
- In the Next Room (1930) as Parks (the butler)
- Slightly Scarlet (1930) as Albert Hawkins
- Such Men Are Dangerous (1930) as Fred Wyndham
- Murder Will Out (1930) as Alan Fitzhugh
- Ladies Love Brutes (1930) as Tailor
- The Czar of Broadway (1930) as Francis
- The Florodora Girl (1930) as Lord Rumblesham
- Monte Carlo (1930) as Prince Otto von Liebenheim
- Reaching for the Moon (1930) as Sir Horace Partington Chelmsford
- Captain Applejack (1931) as John Jason
- Meet the Wife (1931) as Victor Staunton
- I Like Your Nerve (1931) as Archie Lester
- Platinum Blonde (1931) as Dawson, the Valet
- The Sea Ghost (1931) as Percy Atwater
- On the Loose (1931) as Mr. Loder's friend
- The Unexpected Father (1932) as Claude
- Two White Arms (1932) as Dr. Biggash
- Diamond Cut Diamond (1932) as Joe Fragson
- The Return of Raffles (1932) as Bunny
- The Midshipmaid (1932) as Chinley
- That's My Wife (1933) as Archie Trevor
- Excess Baggage (1933) as Col. Murgatroyd, RSVP
- Sleeping Car (1933) as Baron Delande
- The Private Life of Henry VIII (1933) as Cornell
- The Medicine Man (1933) as Hon. Freddie Wiltshire
- Those Were the Days (1934) as Capt. Horace Vale
- The Return of Bulldog Drummond (1934) as Algy Longworth
- The Lady Is Willing (1934) as Brevin
- The Private Life of Don Juan (1934) as The Duke, as Dukes Go
- Every Night at Eight (1935) as Mr. Vernon (uncredited)
- The Dark Angel (1935) as Lawrence Bidley
- Three Live Ghosts (1936) as Lord 'Spoofy' Brockton
- Dracula's Daughter (1936) as Sir Aubrey
- Yellowstone (1936) as Guest with Monocole
- Lady Luck (1936) as Briggs
- Let's Make a Night of It (1937) as Monty
- Bulldog Drummond at Bay (1937) as Algy Longworth
- Danger: Love at Work (1937) as Salesman
- The Awful Truth (1937) as Lord Fabian (uncredited)
- Kentucky Moonshine (1938) as Lord Boffingwell (uncredited)
- Men Are Such Fools (1938) as Rudolf
- Blond Cheat (1938) as Lord Basil Sheldon (uncredited)
- Storm Over Bengal (1938) as Redding
- Arrest Bulldog Drummond (1939) as Sir Basil Leghorne
- Captain Fury (1939) as Suco
- Lillian Russell (1940) as Arthur Sullivan
- Pride and Prejudice (1940) as Mr. Beck (uncredited)
- The Reluctant Dragon (1941) as Sir Giles (voice)
- Charley's American Aunt (1941) as Cricket Match Spectator
- A Yank in the R.A.F. (1941) as Officer/Motorist (uncredited)
- Never Give a Sucker an Even Break (1941) as Bitten Englishman (uncredited)
- Confirm or Deny (1941) as William (scenes deleted)
- Don't Get Personal (1942) as Sir Cecil (uncredited)
- Forever and a Day (1943) as William Barstow
- The Hundred Pound Window (1944) as Hon. Freddie
- The Captain from Köpenick (completed in 1941, released in 1945), aka I Was a Criminal as First Railroad Employee
- Kiss the Bride Goodbye (1945) as Adolphus Pickering
- Don Chicago (1945) as Lord Piccadilly
- Gaiety George (1946) as Archie
- Dumb Dora Discovers Tobacco (1946) as Sir Percival
- Quartet (1948) as 1st. Clubman (segment "The Colonel's Lady")
- The Adventures of Ichabod and Mr. Toad (1949) as Ratty (voice)
- Hong Kong (1952) as Hotel Manager
- Down Among the Sheltering Palms (1953) as Woolawei (uncredited)
- Kiss Me Kate (1953) as Paul
- The Black Shield of Falworth (1954) as Sir George
