= The Ghost Camera =

1933 film directed by Bernard Vorhaus

- Original trade ad
- Directed by: Bernard Vorhaus
- Written by: Joseph Jefferson Farjeon (short story); H. Fowler Mear
- Produced by: Julius Hagen
- Starring: Henry Kendall; Ida Lupino; John Mills; George Merritt
- Cinematography: Ernest Palmer
- Edited by: David Lean
- Music by: W.L. Trytel
- Production companies: Twickenham Studios; Real Art Productions
- Distributed by: RKO Radio Pictures (UK); Olympic Pictures (US)
- Release dates: September 1933 (UK); 1934 (US)
- Running time: 66 minutes
- Country: United Kingdom
- Language: English

The Ghost Camera is a 1933 British mystery film directed by Bernard Vorhaus, starring Henry Kendall, Ida Lupino and John Mills. It was written by H. Fowler Mear based on "A Mystery Narrative", a short story by Joseph Jefferson Farjeon, and was made as a quota quickie.

== Plot ==
John Gray returns from a seaside holiday and discovers a camera has mysteriously appeared in his car. When he develops the negatives, one of the photos appears to show a man stabbing another. The others offer clues to where the event took place. A man tries to steal the camera from John, and takes the negative.

After identifying the location of a woman in one of the photos, John tracks down Mary Elton, whose missing brother, Ernest, took the photos before disappearing. She and he go on a search through the countryside to try to locate her missing brother. As they investigate, they discover Ernest may be involved in a jewel robbery and murder, and the police also appear to be on his trail. This leads them to a local inn, where Mary misleads John, and later confesses that she was protecting her brother. They find evidence that Ernest was trying to expose the thieves involved in the robbery, by setting up his camera to capture evidence of them. The camera photographed the fatal struggle of the thieves and Ernest fled, dropping the camera in John's car.

Ernest is arrested but later confesses his role in the crime. John, suspecting that the policeman investigating the case might actually be the murderer, confronts him and uncovers the truth. The murderer is caught, Ernest is released, and John and Mary, now in love, become engaged.

== Cast ==
- Henry Kendall as John Gray
- Ida Lupino as Mary Elton
- John Mills as Ernest Elton
- Victor Stanley as Albert Sims
- George Merritt as police detective
- Felix Aylmer as coroner
- Davina Craig as Amelia Wilkinson, maid
- Fred Groves as Barnaby Rudd, landlord

== Production ==
The film was made at Julius Hagen's Twickenham Studios as part of a long-term contract to provide films for the American major studio RKO enabling it to comply with the terms of the Cinematograph Films Act 1927. Most such films were cheaply made supporting features which became known as "quota quickies". Hagen's Twickenham company developed a reputation as a leading producer of popular quota quickies.

The film's director, Bernard Vorhaus, had arrived in Britain from America in 1930 and established himself as a director of quota films in Britain's rapidly growing film industry. His films became notable for featuring rapid editing (he often used the young David Lean as editor, who claimed that Vorhaus was a major early influence on him) and location shooting, both of which were relatively rare for supporting films.

== Release ==
The film premièred in September 1933 at MGM's flagship Empire Cinema in Leicester Square as the supporting feature on a double bill headed by Turn Back the Clock, where it was met by a hostile reception by the audience. However, when the film went on general release it proved popular with audiences and in a number of cinemas it was given top-billing.

== Reception ==
The Daily Film Renter wrote: "Ingenious direction secures maximum suspense values from convincing narrative and series of strong situations.... Ever and again, the director emphasises certain phases with clever touches, and there are numerous ideas that mark out Bernerd Vorhaus as a man of directorial promise. Henry Kendall plays the chemist on his usual lines of good humour, and with Ida Lupino has an excellent foil, although she is hardly called upon to do much in the way of acting here."

Picture Show wrote: "Straightforwardly directed murder mystery."

Variety wrote: "This is an unusual mystery thriller with a good story by Jefferson Farjeon, an English dramatist who has considerable success on the stage with his plays of that calibre. ... Palpably designed for quota purposes, the picture goes consider ably beyond that category and would stand up as a first-rate feature in the provincial picture houses here."

== Bibliography ==
- Chibnall, Steve. Quota Quickies: The Birth of the British 'B' film. British Film Institute, 2007.
- Richards, Jeffrey (ed.). The Unknown 1930s: An Alternative History of the British Cinema, 1929- 1939. I.B. Tauris & Co, 1998
