= Berkely Mather =

British writer (1909–1996)

- Born: John Evan Weston Davies; 25 February 1909; Gloucester, Gloucestershire, England, United Kingdom
- Died: 9 April 1996 (aged 87); East Sussex, United Kingdom
- Occupation: Screenwriter
- Years active: 1955–1969

John Evan Weston-Davies (25 February 1909 – 7 April 1996), also known as Jasper Davies and published under the name Berkely Mather, was a British writer who wrote fifteen published novels and a book of short stories. He also wrote for radio, television and film.

== Biography ==
Shortly before World War I, Mather's family emigrated to Australia, where he received his education. He studied medicine, the family profession, at Sydney University. Finding himself in England without job prospects at the height of the Great Depression, he enlisted in the Royal Horse Artillery, but was not accepted. He therefore applied to join the Indian Army, in which he rose through the ranks, becoming a sergeant at the start of World War II in 1939. He served in the Iraq campaign under William Slim, and ended the war as an acting lieutenant-colonel. After India gained independence in 1947, he rejoined the British Army, serving in the Royal Artillery until he retired in 1959.

He scripted his first TV series, Tales from Soho in the mid-1950s. Produced by Tony Richardson, it featured his detective Inspector Charlesworth (played by John Welsh), who was used again in later productions. Other TV work included African Patrol, Z Cars, The Avengers and the American series I Spy. Mather's first novel, The Achilles Affair (1959), was a minor best-seller, and his second, The Pass Beyond Kashmir (1960), which received glowing reviews from Ian Fleming and Erle Stanley Gardner, did even better. Ernest Hemingway owned copies of both these novels. Mather's espionage thrillers can be read separately, but are linked to each other by recurring characters, in particular the sardonic and resourceful British agent Idwal Rees, who appears in The Pass Beyond Kashmir, The Terminators and Snowline. His last three novels were a trilogy that followed the fortunes of the Stafford family in the Near and Far East from the middle of the nineteenth century to the middle of the twentieth.

Two of Mather's early books stand somewhat apart from the rest in that they are spin-offs from his work in other media. Geth Straker (1962) started out as a radio serial, hence the tag on the front cover: "Further daring exploits from the log of radio's trouble hunting mariner". The book contains four stories. Genghis Khan (1965) is a novelisation of the 1965 film of the same name, for which he had written the original story. Mather's other motion picture credits include The Long Ships and Dr. No with Mather borrowing a copy of Fleming's original novel from his son. Mather also provided uncredited rewrites of the screenplays for From Russia with Love and Goldfinger.

James Bond film producers Albert R. Broccoli and Harry Saltzman purchased the film rights to The Pass Beyond Kashmir for Columbia Pictures in 1963. Sean Connery and Honor Blackman were to star. Production was to have begun in late 1964 in Britain and on location in the Far East.

== Bibliography ==
=== Novels ===
- The Achilles Affair (1959)
- The Pass Beyond Kashmir (1960)
- The Heavy Steal. Serialised in TV Times, October 1963. Not yet published in book form
- Genghis Khan (1965) (novelisation of the screenplay of the 1965 film Genghis Khan)
- The Road and the Star (1965)
- The Gold of Malabar (1967)
- The Springers (US title: A Spy for a Spy) (1968)
- The Break in the Line (US title: The Break) (1971)
- The Terminators (1971)
- Snowline (1973)
- The White Dacoit (1974)
- With Extreme Prejudice (1975)
- The Memsahib (1977)
- The Pagoda Tree (1979) (Far Eastern Trilogy, Book 1)
- The Midnight Gun (1981) (Far Eastern Trilogy, Book 2)
- The Hour of the Dog (1982) (Far Eastern Trilogy, Book 3)

=== Short fiction collection ===
- Geth Straker (1962) (contains "Rim of the Wheel", "Alpecchi Reach", "Weed" and "Special Currency")

=== Uncollected short fiction ===
- "Dual Control". Argosy (UK), March 1957
- "Nylon Mask". Argosy (UK), May 1957
- [Titles unknown]. Series of stories sset in Cyprus. Daily Mail, Beginning 30 September 1957
- "Pagoda Well". Argosy (UK), September 1958
- "Laumoto Incident". Argosy (UK), June 1959
- "Tales from Hong Kong". Series of linked stories. Daily Mail, beginning 18 May 1959
- "Ski Test". Argosy (UK), January 1960
- "Returned without Thanks". Argosy (UK), October 1960; republished as "Cri de Coeur" in Ellery Queen's Mystery Magazine, August 1961
- "The Fish of My Uncle's Cat". Ellery Queen's Mystery Magazine, November 1961
- "Blood Feud". The Saturday Evening Post, 25 August 1962
- "Necklace for a Warrior". Argosy (UK), December 1962
- "When a Duke Falls among Thieves". Bristol Evening Post, 13 August 1965
- "The Diamond Watch". The Saturday Evening Post, 8 April 1967
- "Ma Tante Always Done Her Best". The Saturday Evening Post, December 1968
- "For the Want of a Nail". Argosy (UK), February 1968; republished as "For Want of a Nail" in Ellery Queen's Mystery Magazine, April 1968
- "Terror Ride". Ellery Queen's Mystery Magazine, April 1970
- "There's a Moral in it Somewhere". Argosy (UK), May 1970
- "The Big Bite". Ellery Queen's Mystery Magazine, December 1970
- "The Rajah's Emeralds". Ellery Queen's Mystery Magazine, April 1971
- "Treasure Trove". Ellery Queen's Mystery Magazine, July 1971
- "No Questions Asked". Ellery Queen's Mystery Magazine, April 1972

=== Television Plays ===
==== Individual Plays ====
- "The Fast Buck". BBC Television, 16 November 1954
- "Change of Air". BBC Television, 10 June 1957
- "Needle Point". BBC Television, ("Suspense"), 18 June 1962
- "To Bury Caesar". ITV ("Television Playhouse"), 12 September 1963

==== Series ====
- "As I Was Saying...". BBC Television, 1955
- "Tales from Soho". BBC Television (Featuring Detective Chief Inspector Charlesworth), 1956
- "New Ramps for Old". BBC Television (Featuring Detective Chief Inspector Charlesworth), 1956
- "Mister Charlesworth". BBC Television (Featuring Detective Chief Inspector Charlesworth), 1957
- "Big Guns". BBC Television (Featuring Detective Superintendent Charlesworth), 1958
- "Charlesworth at Large". BBC Television (Featuring Detective Superintendent Charlesworth), 1958
- "Charlesworth". BBC Television (Featuring Detetctive Superintendent Charlesworth), 1959
- "You Can't Win". BBC Television, 1961

=== Radio plays ===
==== Individual plays ====
- "Southern Channel". BBC Home Service ("Saturday Matinee"), 19 February 1955
- "The Consolation Prize". BBC Light Programme ("Mid-Week Theatre"), 25 October 1961
- "Apprentice to Danger". BBC Light Programme ("Mid-Week Theatre"), 29 August 1962
- "Bird's Eye View". BBC Light Programme, 12 October 1962
- "A Necklace for the Warriors". BBC Light Programme ("Thirty Minute Theatre"), 12 February 1963
- "Touch of an Angel". BBC Light Programme ("Thirty Minute Theatre"), 12 March 1963
- "Letter from a Lady". BBC Light Programme ("Afternoon Theatre"), 15 June 1963
- "The Blue Ox". BBC Light Programme ("Saturday Night Theatre"), 1 May 1965
- "Meritorious Service". BBC Radio 4 ("Thirty Minute Theatre"), 25 September 1984

==== Series ====
- "The Pagoda Well". BBC Light Programme 1959
- "The Sand Leopard". BBC Light Programme (Featuring Geth Straker) 1961
- "The Maresciallo". Written with Victor Francis. BBC Light Programme 1964
- "The Bounce Back". BBC Light Programme 1967
- "The Hard Buy". BBC Radio 2 1968
- "Tales from the Poona Club". BBC Radio 4 1970
- "The Meisterspringer". BBC Radio 4 1985
