= Geraldine's First Year =

1922 film

- Directed by: George A. Cooper
- Written by: Mayell Bannister
- Starring: Betty Farquhar; Sydney Folker; Joan McLean
- Production company: Quality Plays
- Distributed by: Walturdaw
- Release date: July 1922
- Country: United Kingdom
- Languages: Silent; English intertitles

Geraldine's First Year is a 1922 British silent comedy film directed by George A. Cooper and starring Betty Farquhar, Sydney Folker and Joan McLean.

== Cast ==
- Betty Farquhar as The Maid
- Sydney Folker as Jim Cunninghame
- L. March as Mrs. Venable
- Joan McLean as Geraldine

== Bibliography ==
- Murphy, Robert. Directors in British and Irish Cinema: A Reference Companion. British Film Institute, 2006.
