= The World, the Flesh, and the Devil (1932 film) =

1932 film by George A. Cooper

- Harold Huth and Sara Allgood in the film
- Directed by: George A. Cooper
- Screenplay by: H. Fowler Mear
- Based on: The World, the Flesh, and the Devil, a 1912 play by Laurence Cowen
- Produced by: Julius Hagen
- Starring: Harold Huth; Isla Bevan; Victor Stanley
- Cinematography: James E. Rogers
- Edited by: Stewart B. Moss
- Music by: William Trytel
- Production company: Real Art Productions
- Distributed by: RKO Pictures
- Release date: 23 November 1932
- Running time: 53 minutes
- Country: United Kingdom
- Language: English

The World, the Flesh, and the Devil is a 1932 British crime film directed by George A. Cooper and starring Harold Huth, Isla Bevan and Victor Stanley. It was written by H. Fowler Mear based on the 1912 play of the same title by Laurence Cowen, and was shot at Beaconsfield and Twickenham Studios as a quota quickie for release by RKO Pictures.

== Preservation status ==
The British Film Institute National Archive holds a collection of ephemera but no film or video materials.

== Synopsis ==
The screenplay concerns a lawyer who plans to murder an aristocrat and steal his inheritance.

== Cast ==
- Harold Huth as Nicholas Brophy
- Isla Bevan as Beatrice Elton
- Victor Stanley as Jim Stanger
- Sara Allgood as Emme Stanger
- James Raglan as Robert Hall
- Fred Groves as Dick Morgan
- Frederick Leister as Sir James Hall
- Felix Aylmer as Sir Henderson Trent
- Barbara Everest as Mrs Brophy

== Reception ==
Picturegoer wrote: "While the material is conventional to a degree, George Cooper has succeeded in giving it something fresh in treatment at times, and sets it effectively on the Thames water-front. As the crooked lawyer, Harold Huth gives a sound performance in the spirit of melodrama, while Isla Bevan makes an attractive heroine. A very good cockney study comes from S. Victor Stanley."

Picture Show wrote: "Somewhat lurid melodrama."
