= Austin Trevor =

Northern Irish actor (1897–1978)

- in Death at Broadcasting House (1934)
- Born: Claude Austin Trevor Schilsky; 7 October 1897; Belfast, Ireland
- Died: 21 January 1978 (aged 80); Bury St Edmunds, Suffolk, England
- Occupation: Actor
- Years active: 1930–1969

Claude Austin Trevor Schilsky (7 October 1897 – 21 January 1978) was an Irish actor who had a long career in film and television.

== Career ==
He played the parson in John Galsworthy's Escape at the world premiere in London's West End in 1926 and was the only member of the cast to transfer to New York City for the Broadway production a year later. He played Captain August Lutte in Noël Coward's Bitter Sweet during the long first run of the show in the West End from 1929 to 1931. He was the first actor to play Agatha Christie's detective Hercule Poirot on screen in three British films during the early 1930s: Alibi (1931), Black Coffee (1931) and Lord Edgware Dies (1934). He subsequently turned up in a character part in a later Poirot adaptation The Alphabet Murders in 1965. He stated that he only got the Poirot role because he could speak with a French accent.

During the 1960s he worked largely in television, appearing in series such as The First Churchills in which he played Lord Halifax. He appeared in an episode of the legal drama The Main Chance.

He died in Bury St. Edmunds, Suffolk.

== Filmography ==
=== Film ===
- The W Plan (1930) as Captain of Military Police
- At the Villa Rose (1930) as Inspector Hanaud
- Escape (1930) as Parson
- The Man from Chicago (1930) as Inspector Drew
- Alibi (1931) as Hercule Poirot
- A Night in Montmartre (1931) as Paul deLisle
- Black Coffee (1931) as Hercule Poirot
- The Crooked Lady (1932) as Captain James Kent
- The Chinese Puzzle (1932) as Paul Markatel
- A Safe Proposition (1932) as Count Tonelli
- On Secret Service (1933) as Captain Larco
- The Broken Melody (1934) as Pierre Falaise
- Lord Edgware Dies (1934) as Hercule Poirot
- Death at Broadcasting House (1934) as Leopold Dryden
- Inside the Room (1935) as Pierre Santos
- Mimi (1935) as Lamotte
- Royal Cavalcade (1935) as Captain Oates
- The Silent Passenger (1935) as Inspector Parker
- Parisian Life (1936) as Don Joao
- La Vie parisienne (1936) as Don Joâo
- The Beloved Vagabond (1936) as Count de Verneuil
- As You Like It (1936) as Le Beau
- Dusty Ermine (1936) as Swiss Hotelier-Gang Leader
- Rembrandt (1936) as Marquis
- Sabotage (1936) as Vladimir – Paymaster at Aquarium
- Knight Without Armour (1937) as Dodctor Muller
- Dark Journey (1937) as Colonel Adraxine
- Goodbye, Mr. Chips (1939) as Ralston
- The Followers (1939, television film of the play by Harold Brighouse) as Colonel Redfern
- The Lion Has Wings (1939) as Schulemburg – German Air Chief of Staff
- Law and Disorder (1940) as Heinreks
- Night Train to Munich (1940) as Captain Prada
- Under Your Hat (1940) as Boris Vladimir
- The Briggs Family (1940) as John Smith
- The Seventh Survivor (1942) as Captain Hartzmann
- The Big Blockade (1942) as German: U-boat Captain
- The Young Mr. Pitt (1942) as French Registrar
- The New Lot (1943) as Soldier Talking to Corporal
- Heaven Is Round the Corner (1944) as John Cardew
- Champagne Charlie (1944) as The Duke
- Lisbon Story (1946) as Major Lutzen
- Anna Karenina (1948) as Colonel Vronsky
- The Red Shoes (1948) as Professor Palmer
- So Long at the Fair (1950) as Police Commissaire
- Father Brown (1954) as Herald
- To Paris with Love (1955) as Leon de Colville
- Tons of Trouble (1956) as Sir Hervey Shaw
- Seven Waves Away (1957) as Edward Wilton
- Dangerous Exile (1957) as Monsieur Petitval
- The Naked Truth (1957) as Minister with Heart Attack
- Carlton-Browne of the F.O. (1959) as Secretary General
- Horrors of the Black Museum (1959) as Commissioner Wayne
- Konga (1961) as Dean Foster
- The Day the Earth Caught Fire (1961) as Sir John Kelly
- The Court Martial of Major Keller (1961) as Power
- Never Back Losers (1961) as Colonel Warburton
- The Alphabet Murders (1965) as Judson

=== Television ===
- Quatermass II (1955, 3 episodes) as Fowler
- Whack-O! (1957–72, 5 episodes) as Various roles
- Overseas Press Club – Exclusive! (1957, 1 episode) as Camp Commandant
- Fair Game (1958, 1 episode) as Captain Cramner
- East End, West End (1958, 1 episode) as Unknown role
- Private Investigator (1958, 1 episode) as Sir Julian Waite
- Boyd Q.C. (1958–61, 4 episodes) as Brigadier Boyd
- Dixon of Dock Green (1958–59, 4 episodes) as Various roles
- Charlesworth (1959, 2 episodes) as Lakington/Laporte
- Hancock's Half Hour (1959, 1 episode) as Judge
- The Third Man (1959, 1 episode) as Beaucald
- The Invisible Man (1959, 1 episode) as Hugo
- The Charlie Drake Show (1960, 2 episodes) as Various roles
- Somerset Maugham Hour (1960, 1 episode) as Hon. Charles Pelling
- Knight Errant Limited (1960, 1 episode) as Francis Froude
- Interpol Calling (1960, 1 episode) as Dr. Martin
- Yorky (1960–61, 3 episodes) as Mr Playford
- No Hiding Place (1960–65, 2 episodes) as Silves/Sir Dudley Coniston
- The Escape of R.D.7 (1961, 2 episodes) as Sir Charles Delman
- Frontier Drums (1961, 2 episodes) as Lord Mulgrave
- Spy-Catcher (1961, 1 episode) as Van der Hum
- Top Secret (1962, 1 episode) as Manaleto
- The Count of Monte Cristo (1964, 4 episodes) as Cavalcanti
- Here's Harry (1965, 1 episode) as Various roles
- Poison Island (1965, 5 episodes) as Dr. Beauregard
- Foreign Affairs (1966, 6 episodes) as Sir Hugh Marriot
- Sergeant Cork (1966, 1 episode) as Joseph Fitzroy
- BBC Play of the Month (1967, 1 episode) as Dr. Coutras
- The Forsyte Saga (1967, 2 episodes) as Boterill
- Who Is Sylvia? (1967, 1 episode) as Unknown role
- The Newcomers (1968, 2 episodes) as Rear-Admiral Grainger
- World in Ferment (1969, 1 episode) as Various roles
- W. Somerset Maugham (1969, 1 episode) as Gambler
- The Main Chance (1969, 1 episode) as Judge
- The First Churchills (1969, 4 episodes) as Lord Halifax

== Selected stage credits ==
- Fallen Angels by Noël Coward (1925)
- Escape by John Galsworthy (1926)
- Bitter Sweet by Noël Coward (1929)
- Call It a Day by Dodie Smith (1935)
- Her Excellency by Harold Purcell (1949)
