= Olly Oakley =

British banjo player and composer (1877–1943)

Olly Oakley (1877–1943) (also known as Joseph or James Sharpe) was a British banjo player and composer. He was considered a prominent zither-banjo player in England. His music made up a part of early banjo recordings on the phonograph, and during his life, he became "the most widely recorded English banjoist". Other than his performing name of Olly Oakley, he alternately recorded under the pseudonyms Fred Turner, Signor Cetra, Jack Sherwood, Mr F Curtis, Frank Forrester, and Tim Holes.

== Life and career ==
Joseph Sharpe was born in Birmingham, England in 1877. He started to play the banjo around age 12 after hearing the Bohee Brothers' music. Sharpe's music was influenced by minstrel songs, with a style of playing that was similar to the Bohee Brothers'. He played ragtime music, sentimental songs and original pieces.

From the late 1890s to the 1930s, Sharpe made hundreds of recordings on various labels and performed at British music halls. During the 1910s, his compositions for banjo were played at various concert programs in England. In 1915, he toured South Africa, performing on the banjo.

He made recordings including with Pathé and was filmed on Phonofilm.

In 1922, Sharpe published a statement in the London Gazette stating that he had applied and intended to legally change his name to Olly Oakley.

Sharpe died in 1943.

== Partial Discography ==
The Gay Gossoon
Oakley playing a 1905 composition by Edwin F. Kendall (1921)

- "Rugby Parade March" G & T (1901)
- "Oakley Quickstep", Edison
- "Poppies and Wheat"
- "Sweet Jessamine" No.2046 on The Winner label (Poppies & Wheat is on the other side)
- "Whistling Rufus"
- "The College Rag"
- "Queen of the Burlesque" (1912) – phonograph, music by A. Tilley

== See also ==
- Coon song
- Minstrel show
