= Frank Pettingell =

English actor (1891–1966)

- Born: Frank Edmund George Pettingell; 1 January 1891; Liverpool, Lancashire, England
- Died: 17 February 1966 (aged 75); London, England
- Occupations: Theatre and film actor

Frank Edmund George Pettingell (1 January 1891 – 17 February 1966) was an English actor.

Pettingell was born in Liverpool, Lancashire, and educated at Manchester University. During the First World War he served with the King's Liverpool Regiment.

He appeared in such films as the original version of Gaslight (1940), Kipps (1941, as Old Kipps), and Becket (1964, as the Bishop of York). His collection of printed and manuscript playscripts – mostly acquired from the son of the comedian Arthur Williams (1844–1915) – is held at the Templeman Library, University of Kent.

== Collection ==
Pettingell was an avid collector of popular playscripts and other literature which range from the 18th century to the early 20th century. In 1966, the Bodleian Library in Oxford purchased Pettingell’s collection of 800 volumes of 19th century ‘penny-dreadful’ publications, many published in parts. Other penny dreadfuls and periodicals from Pettingell's collection were donated to the Osbourne Collection of Early Children's Books in Toronto.

The University of Kent acquired the majority of Pettingell’s collection from his widow, Mrs. Ethel Pettingell, in 1967. The collection comprises some 4,400 printed and manuscript playscripts, with a number of works on the history of the English theatre, which were acquired by Pettingell from Arthur Williams (1844–1915), a popular comedian in the late Victorian and Edwardian theatre. The collection spans a range of popular theatre genres such as melodramas, tragedies, farces, and burlesques. In addition to popular plays, the collection includes over 300 pantomime libretti, ten manuscripts and printed texts of Dion Boucicault’s plays, and a collection of manuscript plays from Hoxton’s Britannia Theatre.

== Selected filmography ==
- Jealousy (1931) - Prof. Macguire
- Hobson's Choice (1931) - Will Mossup
- Frail Women (1932) - The Employer
- In a Monastery Garden (1932) - Bertholdi
- The Crooked Lady (1932) - Hugh Weldon
- Once Bitten (1932) - Sir Timothy Blott
- Double Dealing (1932) - Rufus Moon
- A Tight Corner (1932) - Oswald Blenkinsop
- The Lucky Number (1933) - Mr. Brown
- Yes, Madam (1933) - Albert Peabody
- The Good Companions (1933) - Sam Oglethorpe
- That's My Wife (1933) - Josiah Crump
- Excess Baggage (1933) - Gen. Booster, SOS
- This Week of Grace (1933) - Mr. Milroy
- A Cuckoo in the Nest (1933) - Landlord
- Red Wagon (1933) - McGinty
- The Medicine Man (1933) - Amos Wells
- Keep It Quiet (1934) - Joe Puddlefoot
- Sing As We Go (1934) - Uncle Murgatroyd Platt
- My Old Dutch (1934) - Uncle Alf
- The Big Splash (1935) - Bodkin
- The Right Age to Marry (1935) - Lomas
- Hope of His Side (1935) - Harry Swan
- Say It with Diamonds (1935) - Ezra Hopkins
- The Amateur Gentleman (1936) - John Barty
- On Top of the World (1936) - Albert Hicks
- Fame (1936) - Reuben Pendleton
- The Last Journey (1936) - Goddard
- Spring Handicap (1937) - Scullion
- Take My Tip (1937) - Willis
- Millions (1937) - Sir Charles Rimmer
- It's a Grand Old World (1937) - Bull
- Sailing Along (1938) - Skipper Barnes
- Queer Cargo (1938) - Dan
- Return to Yesterday (1940) - Prendergast
- Gaslight (1940) - B.G. Rough
- Busman's Honeymoon (1940) - Puffett
- Kipps (1941) - Old Kipps
- This England (1941) - Gage
- Once a Crook (1941) - The Captain
- Ships with Wings (1941) - Fields
- The Seventh Survivor (1942) - Thomas Pettifer
- The Goose Steps Out (1942) - Prof. Hoffman
- The Young Mr. Pitt (1942) - Coachman
- Get Cracking (1943) - Alf Pemberton
- The Butler's Dilemma (1943) - (uncredited)
- Gaiety George (1946) - Grindley
- The Man Who Came to Dinner (1947, TV Movie) - Sheridan Whiteside
- Escape (1948) - Constable Beames
- No Room at the Inn (1948) - Burrells
- The Magic Box (1951) - Bridegroom's Father in Wedding Group
- The Card (1952) - Police Superintendent
- The Crimson Pirate (1952) - Colonel
- Meet Me Tonight (1952) - Mr. Edwards (segment "Red Peppers")
- The Great Game (1953) - Sir Julius
- Meet Mr Lucifer (1953) - Mr. Roberts
- Value for Money (1955) - Mayor Higgins
- Up the Creek (1958) - Stationmaster
- Corridors of Blood (1958) - Mr. Blount
- Charlesworth at Large (1958, TV series) - Horrobin
- Coronation Street (1961, TV Series) - Mr. Nugent
- Term of Trial (1962) - Ferguson
- The Dock Brief (1962) - Tuppy Morgan
- Becket (1964) - Bishop of York
