= Puppets of Fate (1933 film) =

1933 film

- U.S. theatrical release poster
- Directed by: George A. Cooper
- Written by: R.H. Douglas; Basil Mason; H. Fowler Mear; Arthur Rigby
- Produced by: Julius Hagen
- Starring: Godfrey Tearle; Isla Bevan; Russell Thorndike
- Production company: Real Art Productions
- Distributed by: United Artists
- Release date: 30 December 1933
- Running time: 72 minutes
- Country: United Kingdom
- Language: English

Puppets of Fate (U.S. title: Wolves of the Underworld) is a 1933 British crime film directed by George A. Cooper and starring Godfrey Tearle, Isla Bevan, Russell Thorndike, and Fred Groves. It was written by R.H. Douglas, Basil Mason, H. Fowler Mear and Arthur Rigby.

== Cast ==
- Godfrey Tearle as Richard Sabine
- Isla Bevan as Joan Harding
- Russell Thorndike as Doctor Munroe
- Fred Groves as Arthur Brandon
- Michael Hogan as Gilbert Heath
- Kynaston Reeves as John Heath
- Roland Culver as Billy Oakhurst
- John Turnbull as Superintendent Desabine

== Production ==
The film was shot at Twickenham Studios in London as a quota quickie for release by United Artists.

== Reception ==
Kine Weekly wrote: "A hectic study in revenge, crime and punishment, a British drama which leaves nothing out in its efforts to thrill and covers places as far apart as New York, London and Dartmoor. The involved story works out with clear directness, and spectacnlar sequences, romance and rough stuff play ther allotted parts in the comprehensiveness of the artless but sgripping entertamment. Safe fare for the masses."

Picturegoer wrote: "It is all rather ingenuous, but considering the complicated nature of the plot the director has done well in gathering the threads together and keeping the continuity easy to follow. ... As the detective, Godfrey Tearle is somewhat stilted, but Russell Thorndike is an effectively sinister villain and Isla Bevan an attractive heroine."

Picture Show wrote: "Smooth direction, excellent acting and plenty of action make us overlook the fact that the story is a little far-fetched at times."
