= Nigel Davenport =

English actor (1928–2013)

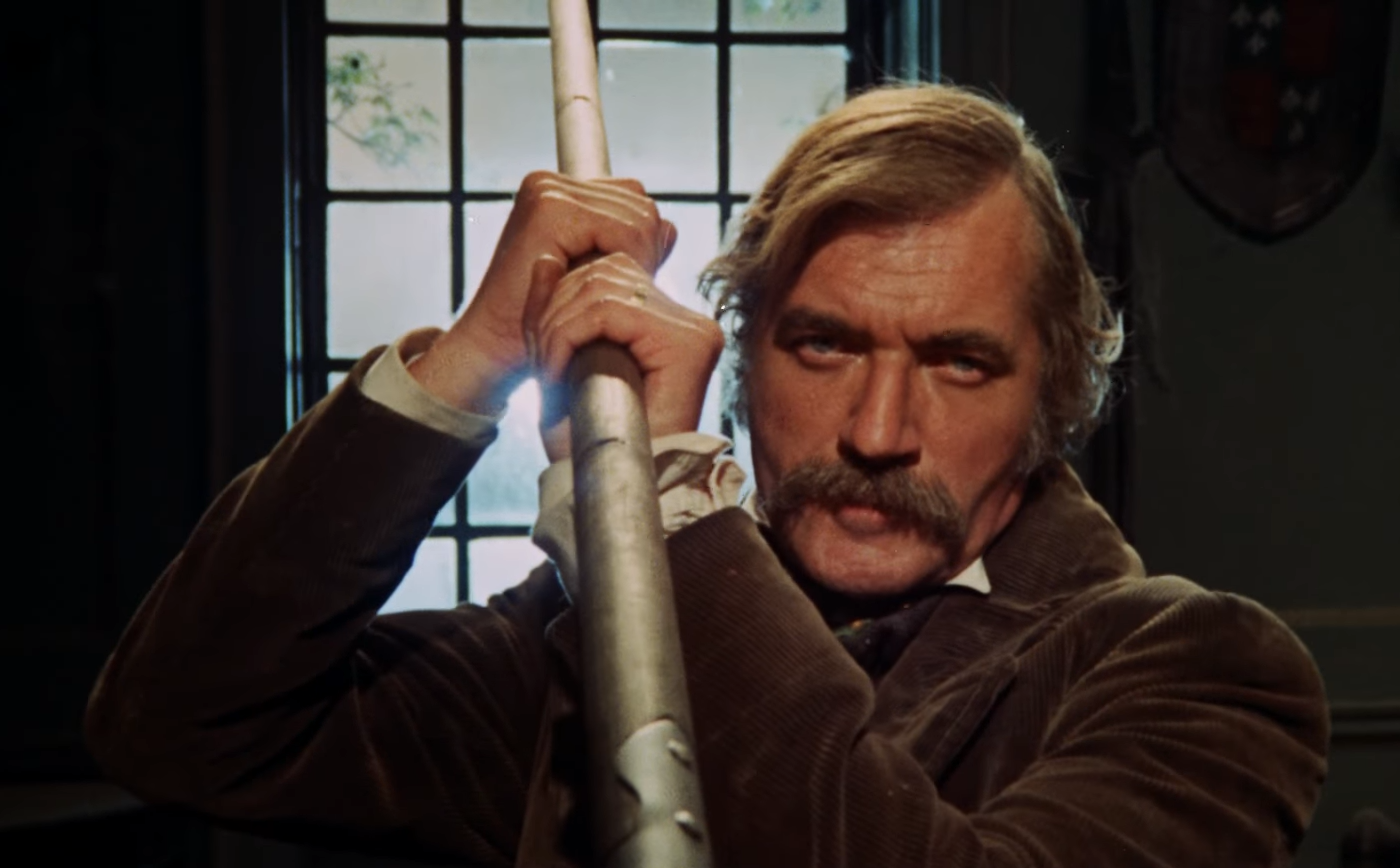
- Davenport as Abraham Van Helsing in Bram Stoker's Dracula
- Born: Arthur Nigel Davenport; 23 May 1928; Great Shelford, Cambridgeshire, England
- Died: 25 October 2013 (aged 85); Gloucester, Gloucestershire, England
- Years active: 1953–2003
- Spouses: Helena White (m. 1951; div. 1960) Maria Aitken (m. 1972; div. 1981)
- Children: 3, including Jack Davenport

Arthur Nigel Davenport (23 May 1928 – 25 October 2013) was an English stage, television and film actor, best known for his film roles as the Duke of Norfolk in A Man for All Seasons (1966), and Lord Birkenhead in Chariots of Fire (1981).

== Early life and education ==
Davenport was born in Great Shelford, Cambridgeshire, son of Arthur Henry Davenport and Katherine Lucy (née Meiklejohn). His father was an engineer, educated at Sidney Sussex College, Cambridge before being employed as an engineer for the Midland Railway, and later a lecturer in engineering, a Fellow, and the bursar at his alma mater, Sidney Sussex College. Arthur Davenport also served for four years in the Royal Engineers during World War I, and was awarded a Military Cross. Nigel's great-uncle, Major Maury Meiklejohn, was awarded a Victoria Cross during the Second Boer War.

He grew up in an academic family and was educated at St Peter's School, Seaford, Cheltenham College and Trinity College, Oxford. Originally he chose to study Philosophy, Politics and Economics but switched to English on the advice of one of his tutors.

In the 1950s Davenport undertook National Service with the Royal Army Service Corps as a disc jockey on the British Forces Broadcasting Service in Hamburg.

== Career ==
Davenport first appeared on stage at the Savoy Theatre and then with the Shakespeare Memorial Company, before joining the English Stage Company, one of its earliest members, at the Royal Court Theatre in 1956. He began appearing in British film and television productions in supporting roles, including a walk-on in Tony Richardson's film, Look Back in Anger (1959). Subsequent roles included a theatre manager opposite Laurence Olivier in the film version of The Entertainer and a policeman in Michael Powell's Peeping Tom (both 1960).

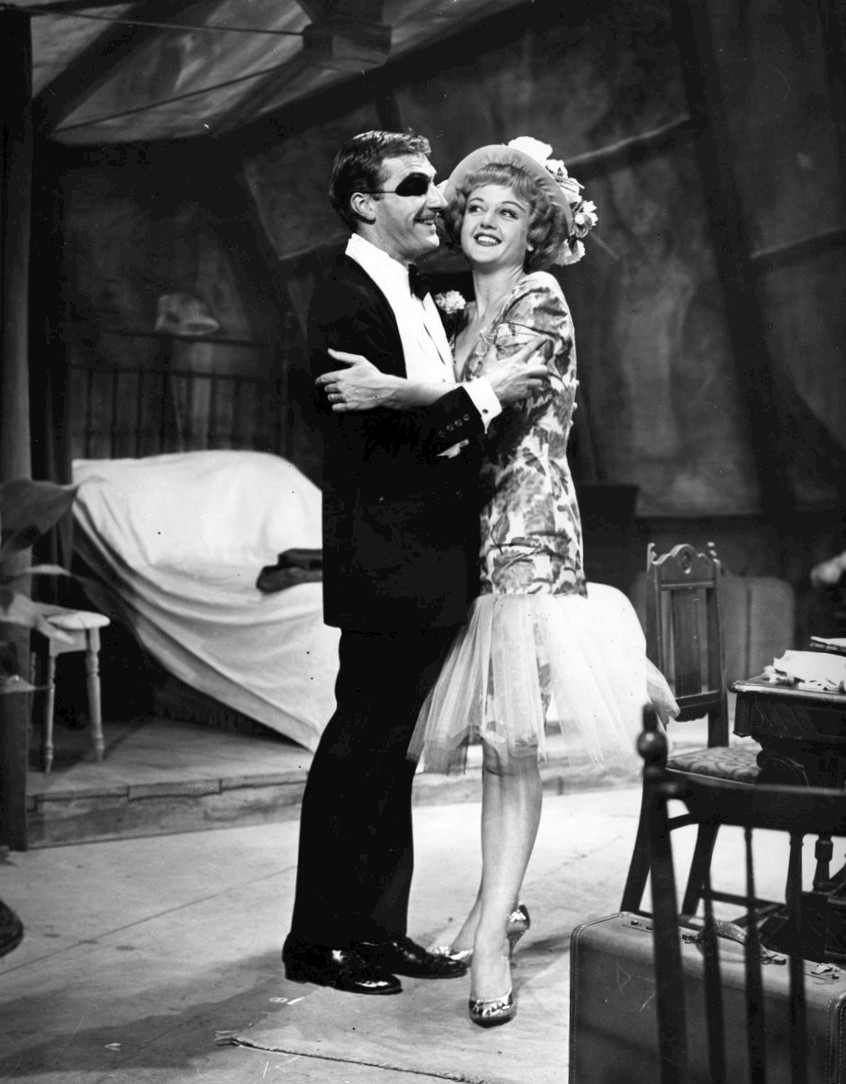
Davenport as Peter with Angela Lansbury as Helen in A Taste of Honey on Broadway, in 1960

In the 1962 last episode of the first season of the TV series The Saint, titled "The Charitable Countess", with Roger Moore as Simon Templar and Patricia Donahue as Countess Rovagna, Davenport played a supporting role as the Countess's confidant, Aldo Petri. Davenport appeared again in The Saint in season 3, episode 16 (titled "The Rhine Maiden") as Charles Voyson.

He made an impression as Thomas Howard, 3rd Duke of Norfolk in A Man for All Seasons (1966), co-starred with Michael Caine in the war movie Play Dirty, and had a major role as Lord Bothwell in Mary, Queen of Scots. In 1972, he appeared as George Adamson, opposite Susan Hampshire in Living Free, the sequel to Born Free.

During the production of Stanley Kubrick's 1968 film 2001: A Space Odyssey, Davenport read the lines of HAL 9000 off-camera during the computer's dialogues with actors Keir Dullea and Gary Lockwood. However, Kubrick thought that Davenport's English accent was too distracting and dismissed him after a few weeks. Canadian actor Douglas Rain was ultimately chosen for the role. Davenport took the leading role in the off-beat Phase IV (1974), which failed to find an audience. In 1979 he starred in the radio serialisation of Prudence, a romance novel by Jilly Cooper, alongside Felicity Kendal. The same years, he portrayed King George III in Prince Regent.

He appeared as Ebenezer Scrooge's grudging father Silas in the George C. Scott version of A Christmas Carol (1984), and played opposite Michael Caine again in the 1988 Sherlock Holmes spoof Without A Clue, which was Davenport's second-last feature film.

He portrayed The Duke of Holdernesse in a 1993 BBC Radio dramatisation of the Sherlock Holmes story "The Adventure of the Priory School".

In February 1997, Davenport was the subject of This Is Your Life when he was surprised by Michael Aspel at David Nicholson's stables near Cheltenham.

He was president of Equity from 1986 to 1992.

== Personal life ==
Davenport was married twice, first to Helena Margaret White whom he met while he was studying at Oxford University. They married in 1951 and had a son and a daughter. His second wife was actress Maria Aitken with whom he had a second son, Jack, also an actor, best known for appearing in Pirates of the Caribbean.

== Filmography ==
=== Film ===
Year	Title	Role	Ref.
1959	Look Back in Anger	1st Commercial Traveller	
1960	Peeping Tom	Det. Sgt. Miller	
1960	The Entertainer	Theatre Manager	
1962	Mix Me a Person	Juke's Stepfather	
1963	Ladies Who Do	Mr Strang	
1963	Bitter Harvest	Police Inspector	
1964	The Third Secret	Lew Harding	
1965	A High Wind in Jamaica	Mr Thornton	
1965	Sands of the Kalahari	Sturdevant	
1966	A Man for All Seasons	Duke of Norfolk	
1966	Where the Spies Are	Parkington	
1968	Play Dirty	Captain Cyril Leech	
1969	The Virgin Soldiers	Sergeant Driscoll	
1969	Sinful Davey	Richardson	
1969	The Royal Hunt of the Sun	Hernando de Soto	
1970	No Blade of Grass	John Custance	
1970	The Mind of Mr. Soames	Dr Maitland	
1971	Villain	Bob Matthews	
1971	Mary, Queen of Scots	Lord Bothwell	
1971	The Last Valley	Gruber	
1972	Living Free	George Adamson	
1973	The Picture of Dorian Gray	Lord Harry Wotton	
1974	Bram Stoker's Dracula	Van Helsing	
1974	Phase IV	Dr Ernest D. Hubbs	
1975	The Regent's Wife	Álvaro Mesía	
1976	Death of a Snowman	Lt. Ben Deel	
1977	The Island of Dr. Moreau	Montgomery	
1977	Stand Up, Virgin Soldiers	Sgt. Driscoll	
1979	The Omega Connection	Arthur Minton	
1979	Zulu Dawn	Colonel Hamilton-Brown	
1980	Cry of the Innocent	Gray Harrison Hunt	
1981	Chariots of Fire	Lord Birkenhead	
1981	Nighthawks	Peter Hartman	
1983	Strata	Victor	
1984	A Christmas Carol	Silas Scrooge	
1984	Greystoke: The Legend of Tarzan, Lord of the Apes	Major Jack Downing	
1986	Caravaggio	Giustiniani	
1988	Without a Clue	Lord Smithwick	
1997	The Opium War		

=== Television ===
Year	Title	Role	Notes	Ref.
1957–1958	The Adventures of Robin Hood	St Peter Marston, Claude the Seneschal, Barty and others	7 episodes	
1957	Mister Charlesworth	Sergeant Spence	6 episodes	
1958	Big Guns	Sergeant Spence	6 episodes	
1962	Sir Francis Drake	Miguel Cervantes	1 episode	
1962-1965	The Saint	Aldo Petri/Charles Voyson	2 episodes	
1963	The Edgar Wallace Mystery Theatre	Dino Stefano/Larry Mason	2 episodes: NB: The Verdict	
1964	Madame Bovary	Rodolphe		
1966–68	The Avengers	Lord Barnes / Robertson		
1969	The Name of the Game	David Windom	1 episode	
1972	The Edwardians	Sir Arthur Conan Doyle	1 episode	
1974	South Riding	Robert Carne	11 episodes	
1975	Oil Strike North	Jim Fraser	13 episodes	
1979	Prince Regent	King George III	8 episodes, TV mini-series	
1981	Masada	Sen. Mucianus	Part 1	
1981	A Midsummer Night's Dream	Theseus	TV movie	
1982	Minder	Ray		
1982	Bird of Prey	Charles Bridgnorth		
1982–83	Don't Rock the Boat	Jack Hoxton	12 episodes, TV mini-series	
1985–1990	Howards' Way	Sir Edward Frere	29 episodes	
1986	Ladies in Charge	Count Litvinoff	1 episode	
1986	Lord Mountbatten: The Last Viceroy	Lord Ismay		
1991	Trainer	James Brant	13 episodes	
1993	Keeping Up Appearances	The Commodore	1 episode: The Commodore	
1994	Woof!	Mr. Wellesby	1 episode	
1996	The Treasure Seekers	Lord Blackstock		
1998	The Adventures of Captain Pugwash	Narrator	26 episodes	
2000	David Copperfield	Dan Peggotty	TV movie	
2000	Midsomer Murders	William Smithers	1 episode	
2000	Longitude	Sir Charles Pelham	TV movie	
