= Petronella Barker (actress, born 1942) =

British actress

Petronella Barker (born 12 October 1942) is a British actress.

== Life ==
The daughter of the comedy actor Eric Barker and the actress Pearl Hackney, she grew up in the village of Stalisfield, Kent, and was educated at Ashford School.

Barker trained at the Central School of Speech and Drama from 1960 to 1963, in her final year winning the Carleton Hobbs Bursary, which gave her a six-month contract with the BBC's Radio Drama Company. In 1964 she joined the English Stage Company at the Royal Court Theatre for three plays: Inadmissible Evidence (understudy), Julius Caesar (crowd and understudy), and Cuckoo in the Nest, in which she played Rawlins. During four seasons with the National Theatre Company at the Old Vic Theatre between 1964 and 1968 she appeared in: Hobson's Choice (as Ada Figgins), Mother Courage and Her Children (Yvette), A Flea in her Ear (Eugenie), The Storm (Glasha), The Dance of Death (Jenny), Othello (Crowd), Juno and the Paycock (Neighbour), The Crucible (Mercy Lewis), Rosencrantz and Guildenstern are Dead (Courtier and Attendant), and Volpone (Androgyno). She played Miss Prue in William Congreve's play Love for Love at the Old Vic Theatre with Laurence Olivier, directed by Peter Wood.

From 1966 1972, Barker was married actor Anthony Hopkins. Together, they have one daughter, Abigail Hopkins (born 1968).

== Selected filmography ==
- 1987: The Bretts (TV series) — "All Right on the Night" – Miss Brownlie
- 1983: Dramarama (TV series) — "Mighty Mum and the Petnappers" – Godmother
- 1981: Roger Doesn't Live Here Anymore (TV series) — Episode #1.4 – Nanny
- 1981: Jackanory Playhouse (TV series) — "The Toy Princess" – Lady-in-waiting
- 1978: Armchair Thriller (TV series) — A Dog's Ransom: Part 5 – Gillian
- 1976: The Molly Wopsies (TV series) — "The Initiation" – Gypsy woman
- 1975: Moody and Pegg (TV series) — "Roland's Ladies" – Miss Thompkins
- 1975: Armchair Cinema (TV series) — "In Sickness and in Health" – The District Nurse
- 1975: Within These Walls (TV series) — "Playground" – Joan Dunn
- 1973: A Pin to See the Peepshow (TV series) — Anne Ackroyd (all episodes)
- 1972–1973: Z-Cars (TV series) — Angela (2 episodes) / Pat Mason (1 episode)
- 1972: The Fenn Street Gang (TV series) — "The Loneliest Night of the Week" – Waitress
- 1972: It's Murder But Is It Art? (TV series) — Fanny Templer
- 1971: The Rivals of Sherlock Holmes (TV series) — Miss Parrot (2 episodes)
- 1971: Budgie (TV series) — "And in Again" – Traffic Warden
- 1971: The Mind of Mr. J.G. Reeder (TV series) — "The Fatal Engagement" – Miss Trottington-Fox
- 1970: The Mating Machine (TV series) — "Ada's Last Chance" – Miss Jones
- 1970: Germinal (TV mini-series) — Cécile (2 episodes)
- 1967: A Flea in Her Ear (TV movie) — Eugénie
- 1965: Othello — Company
- 1964: Call the Gun Expert (TV series) — "The Green Bicycle Case – 1919" – Bella Wright
- 1964: Detective (TV series) – "Trent's Last Case" (1964) — Celestine
