= Fair Exchange (film) =

- Patric Knowles and Roscoe Ates in a scene from the film
- Directed by: Ralph Ince
- Written by: Russell Redcraft; Brock Williams
- Produced by: Irving Asher
- Starring: Patric Knowles; Roscoe Ates; Isla Bevan; Raymond Lovell
- Cinematography: Basil Emmott
- Production company: Warner Brothers
- Distributed by: Warner Brothers
- Release date: July 1936
- Running time: 63 minutes
- Country: United Kingdom
- Language: English

Fair Exchange is a lost 1936 British comedy film directed by Ralph Ince and starring Patric Knowles, Raymond Lovell and Cecil Humphreys. It was written by Russell Redcraft and Brock Williams, and made at Teddington Studios as a quota quickie by the British subsidiary of Warner Brothers.

== Preservation status ==
The British Film Institute has classed Fair Exchange as a lost film. Its National Archive holds a collection of stills but no film or video materials.

== Plot ==
Undergraduates Tony Meredith and Elmer Goodge are sent down from Oxford, after accusing one of the dons of theft. Meredith's father, a famous criminologist, wishes to dampen his son's enthusiasm for detective work so fakes the burglary of a painting for him to investigate. But Meredith and Goodge find that the picture really has been stolen, and track down the thief.

== Cast ==
- Patric Knowles as Tony Meredith
- Roscoe Ates as Elmer Goodge
- Isla Bevan as Elsie Randall
- Raymond Lovell as Sir Reeves Willoughby
- Cecil Humphreys as Matthew Randall
- Louis Goodrich as James Meredith
- Morland Graham as Dr. Franz Schmidt

== Reception ==
The Daily Film Renter wrote: "Pleasant comedy-mystery. ... Well produced and competently directed, should prove acceptable support for popular halls. ... This is not particularly imaginative, but is neat and entertaining, gets into its stride from the outset, and keeps going until the final scene. Settings are good, treatment is workmanlike, and comedy element well to the fore. Patric Knowles contributes an engaging performance as Tony, Rosco Ates is his stuttering self as Elmer, Isla Bevan supplies the slight romantic interest, Raymond. Lovell is the villain in the case, and Louis Goodrich and Cecil Humphreys offer sound portrayals."

Picturegoer wrote: "An unpretentious but quite entertaining comedy-drama. ... Patric Knowles, as one of the embryonic Sherlocks, has a part that fits him perfectly, while his colleague, played by the stuttering Roscoe Ates, provides most of the comedy. Isla Bevan makes an attractive heroine and another good performance comes from Raymond Lovell."
