= Say It with Diamonds (1935 film) =

- Directed by: Redd Davis
- Written by: Jack Marks
- Produced by: Redd Davis
- Starring: Frank Pettingell; Eve Becke; Vera Bogetti
- Production company: Redd Davis Productions
- Distributed by: MGM
- Release date: March 1935
- Running time: 64 minutes
- Country: United Kingdom
- Language: English

Say It with Diamonds is a 1935 British comedy film directed by Redd Davis and starring Frank Pettingell, Eve Becke and Vera Bogetti.

It was shot as a quota quickie at Walton Studios for distribution by the British subsidiary of MGM.

== Cast ==
- Frank Pettingell as Ezra Hopkins
- Eve Becke as Sylvia
- Vera Bogetti as Kay
- Gerald Rawlinson as Richard
- Eileen Munro as Fanny Hopkins
- Ernest Sefton as Mocket
- Arthur Finn as Montana

== Bibliography ==
- Chibnall, Steve. Quota Quickies: The British of the British 'B' Film. British Film Institute, 2007.
- Low, Rachael. Filmmaking in 1930s Britain. George Allen & Unwin, 1985.
- Wood, Linda. British Films, 1927-1939. British Film Institute, 1986.
