= Black Coffee (1931 film) =

1931 British film by Leslie Hiscott

- Adrianne Allen, Austin Trevor, Harold Meade and Philip Strange in the film
- Directed by: Leslie Hiscott
- Screenplay by: Brock Williams; H. Fowler Mear
- Produced by: Julius Hagen
- Starring: Austin Trevor; Adrianne Allen; Elizabeth Allan
- Cinematography: Sydney Blythe
- Edited by: Jack Harris
- Production company: Twickenham Film Studios
- Release date: 14 December 1931
- Running time: 80 minutes
- Country: United Kingdom
- Language: English

Black Coffee is a lost 1931 British "quota quickie" film directed by Leslie Hiscott and starring Austin Trevor, Adrianne Allen and Elizabeth Allan. It was written by Brock Williams and H. Fowler Mear based on the 1930 play Black Coffee by Agatha Christie. It was produced by Julius Hagen at Twickenham Film Studios.

== Preservation status ==
The film is believed lost. The British Film Institute National Archive holds a collection of stills but no film or video materials.

== Plot ==
Inventor Sir Claud Amory is discovered dead not long after hiring the celebrated French detective Hercule Poirot to track down a stolen formula for high explosives. Sir Claud's household is full of potential suspects, with suspicion falling on his financially troubled son Richard, his son's wife Lucia, whose father was an international spy, and the mysterious Dr. Carelli, an Italian with a dubious past. Utilising his extraordinary deductive skills, Poirot unravels the mystery, unmasking the culprit – a person least expected.

== Cast ==
- Austin Trevor as Hercule Poirot
- Adrianne Allen as Lucia Amory
- Elizabeth Allan as Barbara Amory
- Richard Cooper as Capt Hastings
- C.V. France as Sir Claude Amory
- Philip Strange as Richard Amory
- Dino Galvani as Dr Carelli
- Michael Shepley as Raynor
- Melville Cooper as Inspector Japp
- Marie Wright as Miss Amory

== Reception ==
Kine Weekly wrote: "The treatment is a little dilatory for this type of entertainment, but the picture nevertheless contains a few surprises and is embellished with diverting by-play. Leslie Hiscott's direction is sound, but it rather lacks speed and imagination, for it gives one time to think out the plot and furnish its solution, and this rather minimises the dramatic effect."

Picture Show wrote: "A workmanlike adaptation of Agatha Christie's murder mystery thriller. ... Well acted and directed, finely recorded."

Film Weekly called the film "An average 'thriller'."

Variety wrote: "It is not by any means a great film, but it's the sort of stuff which will go quite well here. ... Dialog amusing at times, once unconsciously. Austin Trevor once again as Poirot, good if you like this sort of thing. Supporting cast good. Sort of quota footage which doesn't let the theatre down."
