= The Summing Up =

1938 memoir by W. Somerset Maugham

- Author: W. Somerset Maugham
- Language: English
- Publication date: 1938

The Summing Up is a literary memoir by W. Somerset Maugham, written when he was 64 years old, first published in 1938. It covered his life from 1890 to 1938. The subject matter includes his childhood, his initial success in theater, his transition from theater to fiction writing, and other miscellaneous topics such as travel, and philosophy. It is a small book filled with memorable quotes.
