= Tony Church =

English actor

- Born: James Anthony Church; 11 March 1930; London, England
- Died: 25 March 2008 (aged 77); Oxford, England
- Occupation: Actor
- Years active: 1953–2007

James Anthony Church (11 May 1930 – 25 March 2008) was an English actor, who has appeared on stage and screen. In 1989 he became the Dean of the National Theatre Conservatory, which is the teaching arm of the Denver Center Theatre Company in Denver, Colorado.

== Stage ==
Church was educated at Hurstpierpoint College, and Clare College, Cambridge. In 1953 when fellow Cambridge student Peter Hall directed his first professional production—Pirandello's Henry IV at the Arts Theatre, London—Church was a performer. In 1960 Hall set up the new Royal Shakespeare Company and Church joined him as a founder member.

He was a regular performer with the company until 1987. In 1988 Church took leading parts in Cymbeline, The Winter's Tale and The Tempest, once again under the direction of Peter Hall, at London's National Theatre. He appeared for the last time on the Stratford stage on 31 March 2007, in a special programme marking the closure of the Royal Shakespeare Theatre.

He was appointed Director of Drama at the Guildhall School of Music and Drama in 1982, leaving to take up the post with the Denver Center for the Performing Arts in 1989.

== Film and television ==
He appeared in Work Is a Four-Letter Word (1968), On Giant's Shoulders (1979), Tess (1979), and Krull (1983). In the 1963 BBC production of As You Like It he played Duke Frederick. Later he played Frederick's banished brother, Duke Senior, in the 1978 BBC Television Shakespeare production. He also had small roles as Squire Bancroft in Lillie and Samuel Hoare in Edward & Mrs. Simpson.

== Partial filmography ==
Year	Title	Role	Notes
1968	Work Is a Four-Letter Word	Mr. Arkwright	
1973	Henry Moore: The Language of Sculpture	Narrator	
1973	Henry Moore at Home	Narrator	
1979	Tess	Parson Tringham	
1982	The Plague Dogs	Civil Servant #3	Voice
1983	Krull	Turold	

== Other sources ==
- Trowbridge, Simon (17 December 2008). "Church, Tony". Stratfordians: a Biographical Dictionary of the Royal Shakespeare Company. Oxford, England: Editions Albert Creed. ISBN 978-0-9559830-0-9.
- Who's Who (2007): James Anthony Church
- A Stage for a Kingdom (2013) Tony Church
