= Killing of Charles Walton =

1945 death in Warwickshire

Charles Walton (12 May 1870 – 14 February 1945) was an English man who was found murdered on the evening of 14 February 1945 (St. Valentine's Day), at The Firs farm on the slopes of Meon Hill, Lower Quinton, in Warwickshire, England. The foremost police detective of the era, Chief Inspector Robert Fabian, led the investigation into Walton's death. The chief suspect for the murder was the manager of The Firs, Alfred John Potter, for whom Walton was working on the day he died. However, there was insufficient evidence to convict Potter and the case is currently the oldest unsolved murder in the Warwickshire Constabulary's records. The case has earned some notoriety in popular culture due to its supposed connection with the local belief in witchcraft.

== Background ==
Charles Walton was born on 12 May 1870 to Charles and Emma Walton. An agricultural worker, he lived in Lower Quinton all his life. He was a widower who shared a small cottage, 15 Lower Quinton, with his 33-year-old niece Edith Isabel Walton, whom he had adopted thirty years previously upon the death of her mother. Walton was described as something of a loner who had earned a reputation as a trainer of horses in his youth. It is said that he did not socialise with his neighbours but was not disliked.

Walton walked with a stick because of his rheumatic joints. However, he sought casual farm work wherever he could find it and, for the previous nine months, had been working for a local farmer, Alfred Potter, whose farm was known as The Firs.

Edith Walton had lived with Charles Walton since she was three years old, although her father was still alive and lived at 30 Henley Street, Stratford. Walton had occupied his cottage since World War I and his wife had died on 9 December 1927. Walton had given Edith £1 per week housekeeping but also paid the 3s. per week rent on the cottage, as well as buying their coal and meat. In addition to his casual earnings, Walton received 10s. a week old-age pension.

== Day of the murder ==
On 14 February 1945 Walton left home with a pitchfork and a slash hook – a double-edged pruning implement with a sharpened straight edge on one side and a concave cutting edge on the other. Edith stated that Walton had left his purse at home on 14 February. He was witnessed passing through the churchyard between 9:00 and 9:30 a.m. On this particular day he was slashing hedges in a field known as Hillground on the slopes of Meon Hill.

That day Edith Walton was working as a printer's assembler at the Royal Society of Arts, which had relocated to Lower Quinton for the duration of the Second World War. Walton was expected to be home by 4:00 p.m. Edith returned home around 6:00 pm and found that Walton was not there. His solitary nature and regular habits gave her no solace that he might be in the local pub or visiting a friend.

Edith went to see her neighbour, an agricultural worker by the name of Harry Beasley who lived at 16 Lower Quinton. Together they made their way to The Firs to alert Alfred Potter. Potter claimed to have last seen Charles earlier in the day, slashing hedges in Hillground. The three of them set out in the direction of the spot where Charles had last been seen and eventually found his body near a hedgerow.

The murderer had beaten Walton over the head with his own stick, cut his neck open with the slash hook, and driven the prongs of the pitchfork into either side of his neck, pinning him to the ground. The handle of the pitchfork had then been wedged under a cross member of the hedge and the slash hook had been buried in his neck.

Edith was overcome with grief and began to scream loudly: Beasley tried to pacify her and to make sure that she did not venture too close to the scene. At that moment Harry Peachey was walking along the other side of the hedge. Potter called to him, directed his attention to the body and told Peachey to go and alert the police.

Potter stood guard over the murder scene until the police arrived, while Beasley took Edith back down the hill. The first policeman on the scene was PC Michael James Lomasney who arrived at 7.05 pm. Members of Stratford-upon-Avon CID arrived later in the evening, while Professor James M. Webster, of the West Midlands Forensic Laboratory, arrived at 11:30 p.m. The body was removed at 1:30 a.m.

== Initial investigation ==
At 11 pm on 14 February Detective Inspector Tombs took a statement from Alfred Potter. Potter stated that he had been at the farm for about five years and had known Walton for all that time. He had employed Walton casually for the previous nine months and said that Walton had worked when the weather permitted. Walton had been engaged in hedging for the previous few months and Hillground was the last field needing attention.

Potter stated that he had been in the College Arms with Joseph Stanley, a farmer of White Cross Farm, until noon that day. He had gone straight across to a small field adjoining Hillground and saw Walton working about 500–600 yards away. He said he noticed that Walton had about 6–10 yards of hedge left to cut and that, when he found his body later that day, about four additional yards of hedge had been cut, which would be about half an hour's work.

Potter stated that he knew that it was Walton's habit to stop for lunch at around 11 am and that he would then work continuously until about 4 pm. He described Walton as an "inoffensive type of man but one who would speak his mind if necessary".

The decision to request assistance from the Metropolitan Police (Scotland Yard) was made at an early stage. The Deputy Chief Constable of Warwickshire sent a message on 15 February which stated:

The Chief Constable has asked me to get the assistance of Scotland Yard to assist in a brutal case of murder that took place yesterday. The deceased is a man named CHARLES WALTON, age 75, and he was killed with an instrument known as a slash hook. The murder was either committed by a madman or one of the Italian prisoners who are in a camp nearby. The assistance of an Italian interpreter would be necessary, I think. Dr Webster states deceased was killed between 1 and 2 pm yesterday. A metal watch is missing from the body. It is being circulated.

The details of the watch that were passed to pawnbrokers and jewellers described it as:

Gents plain white metal pocket watch, snap case at back, white enamel face, with "Edgar Jones, Stratford on Avon" thereon. Second hand. English numerals. Valued at 25/- about ten years ago.

On 16 February Chief Inspector Robert Fabian and his partner, Detective Sergeant Albert Webb, arrived to assist the investigation. Later that day, Detective Sergeant Saunders of Special Branch, who was a fluent Italian speaker, also arrived.

Alfred Potter quickly came under suspicion. PC Lomasney, the local policeman who knew Alfred and his wife, Lillian Elizabeth Potter, was asked to stay close to them to see what they might unwittingly reveal.

Detective Sergeant Saunders began interviewing the Italian prisoners of war held at Long Marston. Prisoners were apparently able to roam the area at will and although there was a schedule for work days and free days no record was kept of these movements. On the afternoon of the day of the murder some prisoners had gone into Stratford to see a play, while others had visited the cinema. However, it does not appear that any of the Italians were ever seriously considered a suspect.

=== Post-mortem ===
Professor Webster's post-mortem on Walton found that Walton's trachea had been cut and that he had bruising to his chest and several broken ribs. Walton also had defensive wounds: a cut on his left hand and bruises on the back of his right hand and forearm. Webster concluded that Walton's wounds had been caused by two weapons; a stabbing weapon and a cutting weapon, presumably the pitchfork and the slash hook. Walton had also been hit over the head with his own walking stick which was found three-and-a-half yards from his body with blood and hair adhering to it. It was determined that Walton died between 1 and 2 pm. Walton's shirt had been opened, his trousers had been unfastened at the top and his fly was unbuttoned. Webster's report makes no specific mention of the cross supposedly carved on Walton's chest mentioned in some later accounts.

=== Alfred Potter's account of events ===
On 17 February Potter was interviewed for a second time, on this occasion by Detective Sergeant Webb. Potter stated that Walton had usually worked about four days each week, but never in wet weather. Potter stated that he paid him eighteen pence an hour and usually at the end of each fortnight, although sometimes by the week. He said that he left it to Walton to say how many hours he had completed and implied that Walton was sometimes paid for hours he had not actually worked. He had last paid Walton for the fortnight ending 10 February, when he had given him £2.15s.0.

Potter stated that on the day of the murder he had left the College Arms and gone across to a field known as Cacks Leys to see to some sheep and to feed some calves. When he reached the field it was 12.20 pm and he then saw Walton, working in his shirtsleeves. He was sure of this because it was the first time he had seen him so dressed and had said to himself, 'He's getting on with it today'. Potter added that he would have gone over to see Walton were it not for the fact that he had a heifer in a ditch nearby that needed attention. He went straight home and arrived there at about 12.40 pm. He then went to attend to the heifer.

On 20 February PC Lomasney was at The Firs and mentioned the fact that the police were still hoping to take fingerprints from the murder weapons. At this, Alfred Potter said that he had touched the handle of the slash hook, and possibly the pitchfork, when he first came across the body, and claimed that he had already mentioned this to the police. He said that he had handled the weapons in response to a comment from Harry Beasley that "You'd better have a look to make sure he is gone." Mrs Potter had displayed considerable annoyance at this revelation, stating that the police were bound to suspect him if his prints were on the murder weapon. Potter, meanwhile, told Lomasney that the murder was "the work of a fascist from the camp". A short time later a serviceman came to the door and asked for Potter who was in the yard. Lomasney recorded that when Potter came in he said, "That soldier has just told me that the military police at the camp have caught an Italian coming out with a suit of clothes and detained him and sent for the civil police, who came dashing out. They have taken him away with them." At this, "Potter affected great glee and his wife became almost hysterical with delight".

According to Fabian's initial report, Potter stated on 23 February that after his visit to Cacks Ley he had come home, read the paper for five minutes, and had then gone to help one of his workers, Charles Henry "Happy" Batchelor, to pulp some mangolds for a few minutes. Subsequently, both men had gone to look at the church clock and saw that it was 1 pm. This account was confirmed by Mrs Potter who stated that Alfred Potter had arrived home soon after 12.30 pm and had read the paper for a few minutes. He had then asked how long dinner would be and she had replied "Not long". On hearing this, Potter had gone to help Batchelor at about 12.40 pm and returned at 1.05 pm. Batchelor also confirmed that Potter had come to help him at around 12.40 pm.

On 27 February Fabian asked that enquiries be made of Stubbs & Bradstreet about any debts recorded against Alfred Potter or L. L. Potter & Co., Farmers of Campden, Gloucestershire. (Alfred Potter's father, Levi Potter, was the licensee of the Lygon Arms in Chipping Campden.) Subsequently, it was confirmed that there were no such debts. Fabian also asked for enquiries to be made at the Ministry of Agriculture and Fisheries about the result of a "test wages investigation made on 12 January 1945 at Firs Farm by Inspector R. G. Elliott" who was apparently reluctant to reveal the information to Fabian without authority from his Headquarters.

Again, in his initial crime report Fabian recorded that, at the inquest on Charles Walton on 20 March, Potter had told the Coroner that he had seen someone in shirtsleeves in his field at 12.30 pm and that they were stationary.

=== Other enquiries ===
Edith claimed that Potter stated the following as they made their way to Hillground with Harry Beasley on the day of the murder; 'I have to do the milking on a Wednesday. I came to the field to cut some hay at 12 o'clock and saw your uncle at his work'. Edith stated that she had never heard Walton say he had ever lent anyone any money and she had not seen any IOUs. Subsequent enquiries of the Midland Bank revealed that Walton had deposited £227.10s.0 in June 1930 but that by 1939 this had dwindled to £11.11s.9d. Walton had made numerous withdrawals during the intervening years, but never more than £10 or so at a time.

Fabian's investigations also revealed that Walton's best friend was seventy-two-year-old George Higgins of Fairview, Lower Quinton, although the pair had not seen each other since the previous Christmas. Higgins was employed by Mr Valender of Upper Quinton and at the time of the murder had been working in a barn just 300 yards from Walton. Fabian speculated that Higgins could have made his way across the fields unseen and killed Walton. However, he doubted that the old man would have had the strength to mount such an attack or sufficient motive.

When Harry Beasley was interviewed he told the police that he was employed by Harry Ball of Henney's Farm in the village. He said that "Potter had a reputation as a decent man to work for". On the night of 14 February, he recalled Potter saying of Walton, "I saw him at work at 12.15". Beasley also confirmed that Edith Walton had been going out with one Edgar Goode for some years, although Goode was later eliminated from the police enquiries. Beasley said he was confident that Potter realised Walton was dead from the moment he saw Walton's body.

The police took statements from two former employees of Potter's – William George Dyde and George Purnell. Both confirmed that, from time to time, Potter had experienced difficulties in paying their wages.

Joseph Stanley confirmed that Potter had assisted him with the castration of two calves on the morning of 14 February and that they had subsequently visited the College Arms where Potter had drunk two glasses of Guinness between 11.45 am and noon.

Statements were taken from over 500 residents of Lower Quinton, some as young as eleven years old, as well as other individuals who were in and around the area on 14 February. A detailed search of the entire area surrounding the murder scene was undertaken, with the help of the Royal Engineers using mine detectors, in an attempt to find Walton's pocket watch or some other clue, but to no avail.

Eventually Fabian and Webb returned to London while Detective Superintendent Alec Spooner continued to search for the murderer. The murder so fascinated Spooner that it is claimed he continued to return to the village long after the rest of the world had concluded that the perpetrator would never be found. There were reports that Walton's pocket watch was found in the outhouse of his cottage in 1960, despite an extensive search by the police at the time of the murder.

== Alfred Potter ==
Alfred Potter was forty years old at the time of the murder and managed The Firs for L. L. Potter & Co. which was a company owned by his father. Robert Fabian concluded that Alfred Potter was the likely killer of Charles Walton.

- Potter's behaviour on the night of the murder did not appear to be that of an innocent man. When Constable Lomasney arrived at 7.05 pm he noted that "Potter seemed very upset. He was shivering and complained of being cold. Looking back I think that Potter appeared more worried than one would have expected him to be." After all, Lomasney reasoned, Potter was used to slaughtering animals and might have been less moved by the murder scene than other men. Lomasney was also surprised when Potter said he was going home before the Stratford police turned up. He said, "His complaint of feeling cold I considered a strange excuse from one who was used to attending to animals at all hours and in all kinds of weather, especially as the murdered man was his own employee and had been murdered on his own land." In fact, the Stratford police turned up just as Potter was leaving.
- On 17 February, Potter said he would have gone over to see Walton at Hillground on 14 February were it not for the fact that he had a heifer in a ditch nearby that he needed to attend to. He claimed he had gone straight home, arriving there at about 12.40 pm, and then went to attend to the heifer. However, the heifer was found to have drowned in Doomsday Ditch on 13 February and was not removed from The Firs until 3.30 pm on 14 February – almost three hours after Potter claimed to have gone to attend to it.
- Potter's statement about the heifer was contradicted by his statement on 23 February that he had gone home, read the paper and then helped Charles Batchelor to pulp mangolds. Fabian's comment was that "Potter is undoubtedly lying about his actions at this critical time but the reason for these lies can, for the present, only be a matter for conjecture".
- Fabian's cynicism about Potter's activities between noon and 12.40 pm was increased by the fact that he variously stated he had seen Walton working in the distance at 12.10 pm, 12.15 pm and 12.20 pm, ultimately telling the inquest that he had seen 'someone' stationary at 12.30 pm. Fabian commented that "Thus we have Potter's story gradually changing from seeing Charles Walton working at hedge cutting at 12.10 pm to seeing a man standing stationary in the field at 12.30 pm".
- Potter's statements about seeing Walton at work invariably said that he was in his shirtsleeves. However, when his body was found, he was wearing a jacket. Underneath this jacket, he was wearing a shirt, but the sleeves were cut off above the elbow. Thus Potter could not have seen Walton in his shirtsleeves. In Fabian's view, even if Potter had merely seen Walton with his jacket off, "it seems improbable he would have worked in shirt sleeves at 12.20 and then put his jacket on, unless he had decided to go home".
- On 20 February, Potter said he had previously mentioned to the police that he had touched the murder weapons and that this had been at Harry Beasley's instigation. However, this was the first time he had made such a claim to the police, and Beasley strongly refuted any question that he had asked Potter to make sure Walton was dead: Beasley said it was patently obvious that he was dead and that Potter did not touch the weapons in his presence. Fabian's comment was that Potter produced this explanation only when Lomasney broached the question of fingerprints on 20 February; he considered that Potter had "gone to great pains to explain away any of his fingerprints which might be found upon the weapons ...". In the event, no prints were found.
- Potter's suggestion that he might occasionally pay Walton for hours he had not worked was disproved by an examination of the sums he had indented for wages from L. L. Potter & Co. and those he had paid to Walton. What Potter was in reality doing was claiming more than he needed to pay his employee, and pocketing the difference. Fabian's comment was that "Potter, by his own admission, is guilty of claiming more wages than were due and there is no doubt that he was making a good thing out of Walton's employment by him".
- After Fabian and Webb had returned to London, the police constable who had relieved Lomasney and stood guard over the murder scene reported that Potter had returned to Hillground soon after first light on 15 February. The policeman had warned Potter away from the actual site of the murder. Potter had exchanged a few pleasantries about the coldness of the weather, given the constable a Player's cigarette and then left. This revelation brought Fabian and Webb back for another interview with Potter and some searching questions about why he had not told them earlier about visiting the scene. However, this interview does not seem to have advanced the case any further, although it was noted that "Happy" Batchelor and another employee of Potter's had both resigned since the murder. Fabian believed both had possibly realised the nature of the man for whom they were working. He also wondered if Batchelor had compromised himself by stating that he had seen Potter at 12.40 pm.
- The trousers that Potter had worn on 14 February were described as being made from Bedford cord. There were two marks on the front that Professor Webster believed were blood stains; however, he reported that they had been cleaned too thoroughly for a positive analysis.

The key for the police was establishing Potter's movements between 12 noon, when he parted company from Joseph Stanley at the College Arms, and 12.40 pm when Charles Batchelor said he saw him at The Firs. Despite Potter changing his story in various ways, Fabian concluded that there was "no real evidence to connect him with the murder itself, and no reasonable motive can be found for his committing it". Fabian found that there was no evidence that Potter was violent or that he and Walton had ever quarrelled. He described Potter as morose and sullen at his interviews although, even when "closely interrogated", he "never lost his temper" and was civil. He wrote that Potter was "unkempt" and "on the surface dull witted" although "I am convinced he is far from that". Indeed, Fabian believed Potter to be a "man of considerable strength" and an "extremely cunning individual".

Although a number of writers have suggested that Walton had lent Potter money and its repayment was overdue, there is no proof that this was the case.

== Ann Tennant ==
Ann Tennant was a resident of Long Compton, fifteen miles from Lower Quinton, and was murdered at the age of eighty. On 15 September 1875, at about 8 o'clock in the evening, Ann Tennant left her house to buy a loaf of bread. On her way back, she met some farm workers returning home from harvesting in the fields. One of the group was a local man, James Heywood, who had known Ann's family for many years. Heywood was simple-minded and was seen as something akin to a village idiot. It is known that he had also been drinking cider. Without warning he attacked Ann Tennant with a pitchfork, stabbing her in the legs and head.

A local farmer named Taylor heard the commotion and ran to Ann's aid. He restrained Heywood until a constable arrived. Ann was taken to her daughter's house but died of her injuries at around 11.15 that night. Heywood claimed that Ann was a witch and that there were other witches in the village whom he intended to deal with in the same way. Although committed to trial for murder, he was found not guilty on the grounds of insanity and spent the rest of his life in Broadmoor Criminal Lunatic Asylum. He is recorded as dying there, at the age of 59, in the first half of 1890.

On 13 February 1954, the eve of the ninth anniversary of Walton's murder, the Daily Mirror revisited the killing of Ann Tennant and alleged similarity between that event and Walton's murder. The report stated: "The police have found one other link between the killings, but I am pledged not to reveal it."

== Claims of witchcraft ==
The two reports that Fabian wrote on the case in 1945 and which are preserved in the police file make no mention of witchcraft, ritualistic killing, black dogs, natterjack toads or blood sacrifices. However, twenty-five years later he wrote the following:

I advise anybody who is tempted at any time, and on any pretext, to venture into Black Magic, witchcraft, Satanism – call it what you will – to remember Charles Walton and to think of his death, which was so clearly the ghastly climax of a pagan rite. There is no stronger argument for keeping as far away as possible from the villains with their swords, incense and mumbo-jumbo. It is prudence on which your future peace of mind and even your life could depend.

It has been claimed that Fabian was acquainted with two pieces of local history. The first related to the murder of Ann Tennant by James Heywood, on the grounds that she was a witch. In many accounts, it has been erroneously claimed that Ann was pinned to the ground with a pitchfork and slashed with a bill-hook. Additionally, Detective Superintendent Alec Spooner, Head of Warwickshire C.I.D., is said to have drawn Fabian's attention to a 1929 book entitled Folklore, Old Customs and Superstitions in Shakespeare Land, written by the Rev. James Harvey Bloom, Rector of Whitchurch, Warwickshire, and father of author Ursula Bloom. This included the story of how, in 1885, a young plough boy named Charles Walton had met a phantom black dog on his way home from work on several nights in succession. On the last occasion, the dog had been accompanied by a headless woman. That night Walton heard that his sister had died.

Among the theories and rumours that surrounded this case in subsequent years are the following:

- It was claimed that locals believed that Walton was a witch whose powers were feared by some villagers. It was claimed he could cast the evil eye and kept natterjack toads as pets and used them to "blast" (blight) the crops and livestock of local farmers. Two examples cited were the failure of the 1944 harvest and the death of Potter's heifer on 13 February. It was claimed that this alleged witchcraft led him to be murdered in a ritualistic manner which involved his blood soaking into the ground to 'replenish the soil's fertility'.
- Local folklore held that phantom black dogs roamed the area and were a harbinger of death. It was claimed that, soon after Walton's murder, a black dog was found hanging from a tree close to the murder scene. Fabian wrote that he encountered a black dog while walking at dusk on Meon Hill. The story he related was that dog ran past him and shortly afterwards he met a local boy walking in the same direction. He asked the boy if he was looking for his dog, but when Fabian mentioned the animal's colour, the boy turned a deathly pale and fled in the opposite direction.

== Myths ==
=== Ann Tennant was murdered in the same way as Walton ===
The claims that Ann was pinned to the ground with a pitchfork or slashed with a bill-hook are pure invention. She was attacked in the view of several witnesses and the only similarity with Walton's murder was that a pitchfork was used in both instances.

=== Walton was the boy in the story of the black dog ===
There is no evidence that the Charles Walton mentioned in Bloom's book was one and the same as the murdered Charles Walton. The latter had three older sisters and two younger brothers. If the Charles Walton in the story was subsequently the murder victim, he would need to have had a sister who died in 1885. However, his sisters Mary Ann and Martha Walton both married in 1891 and lived for some years thereafter, while Harriett – in reality Charles's half-sister – was still alive in 1901. Consequently, the story must have related to another Charles Walton unless Emma, his mother, gave birth to a fourth daughter between the April 1881 Census and the end of 1885.

The 1841 Census, taken on 7 June 1841, conveniently records Charles's mother as being just 9 months old, implying that she was born around August or September 1840. In April 1881 she would have been almost 41 years old, without having given birth – at least to a living child – for some five or six years. It is highly unlikely that she did so during the next five years, especially since a detailed study of the birth, marriage and death records held by the Office for National Statistics has failed to produce any likely Walton births or deaths being registered in the Shipston or Stratford-upon-Avon areas during that period.

=== Walton was murdered close to a Druid stone circle in a Druidical ceremony ===
Fabian stated in Fabian of the Yard that:

One of my most memorable murder cases was at the village of Lower Quinton, near the stone Druid circle of the Whispering Knights. There a man had been killed by a reproduction of a Druidical ceremony on St Valentine's Eve.

Gerald Gardner stated in his book The Meaning of Witchcraft:

... the Whispering Knights are not a circle; they are not Druidical, and they are about twelve miles away, as the crow flies, from Lower Quinton. Nor was Charles Walton killed on St Valentine's Eve; and as no one knows for certain just what the Druid's ceremonies were, it is impossible to say that his death was a reproduction of one. Apart from these details, the description is accurate.
