= Hugh Debbieg =

British military engineer and army officer

General Hugh Debbieg
- Born: 1731/2; England
- Died: 27 May 1810 (aged 78/9); London, England
- Military career
- Allegiance: Great Britain; United Kingdom
- Branch: British Army
- Service years: 1742–1803
- Rank: General
- Conflicts: War of the Austrian Succession; French and Indian War

General Hugh Debbieg (1731/2 – 1810) was an English army officer, military engineer and surveyor.

== Biography ==
=== War of the Austrian Succession ===
Hugh Debbieg was born in 1731. He entered the Royal Artillery as matross on 1 April 1742, obtained a cadetship in May 1744, and in April 1745 became cadet-gunner. On 7 May 1746 he was attached as an engineer to the expedition under Lieutenant-General James St Clair against L'Orient. He took part in the siege of that place in September, and in the subsequent descent on Quiberon. He then resumed his studies at the Royal Military Academy, Woolwich. On 30 January 1747 he was appointed engineer extraordinary in Flanders. Debbieg attracted the attention of the Duke of Cumberland and Marshal Bathiani by his boldness and intelligence, and was made an extra aide-de-camp to the duke. He was present at the Battle of Val on 2 July, when he displayed conspicuous valour, winning the praise of the commander-in-chief. He served at Bergen op Zoom during the siege by the French from 14 July to 17 September, when it was taken by assault.

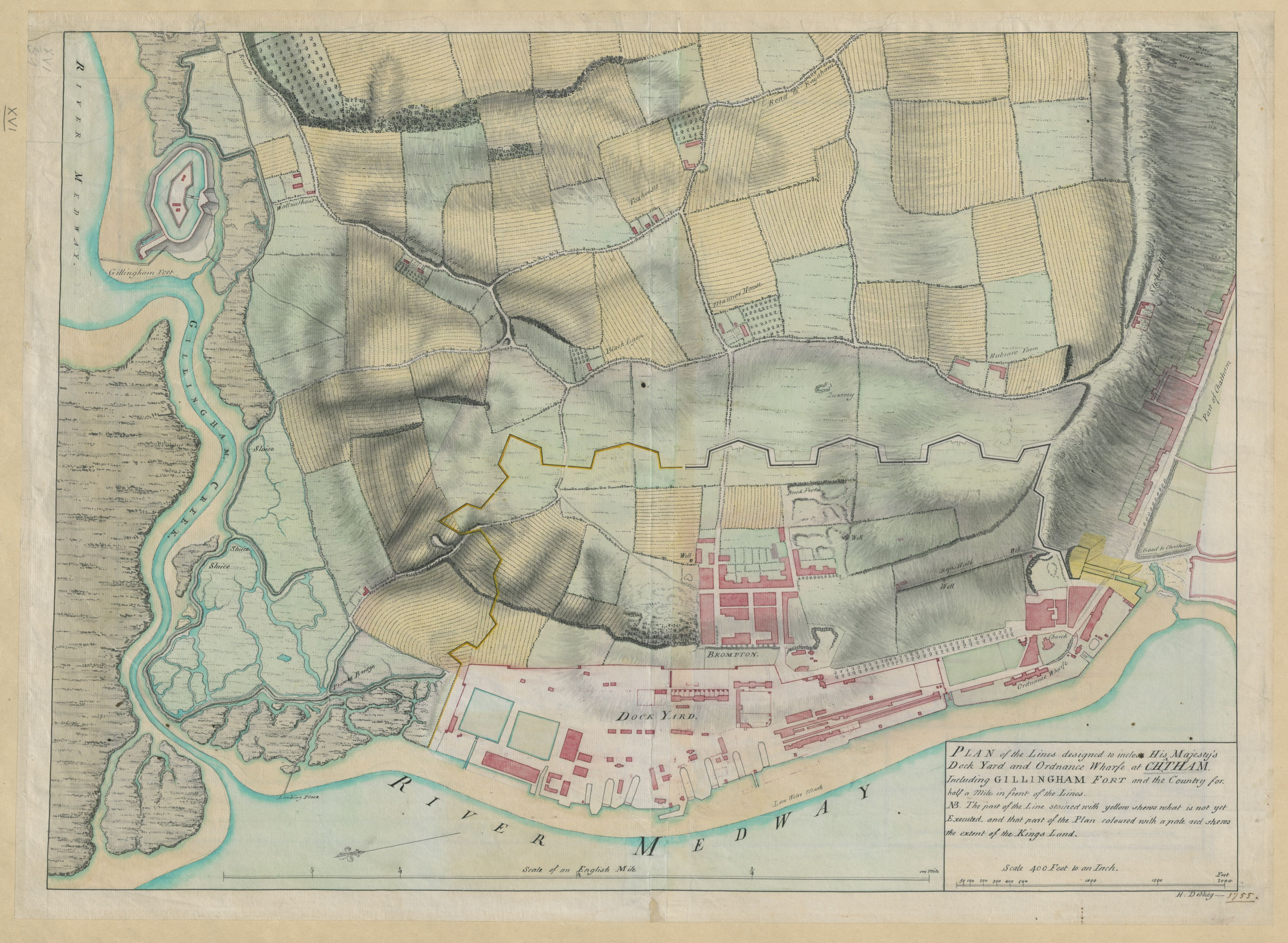
Plan of Fortifications at Chatham (1755)

On the suspension of hostilities Debbieg was one of the engineers selected to make a survey of the seat of war in Brabant, and was placed on the establishment as practitioner engineer on 2 April 1748. After the conclusion of the Treaty of Aix-la-Chapelle, on 7 October 1748, he returned home and was employed on survey operations in Scotland and the north of England, assisting Colonel Dugald Campbell in the construction of the military road from Newcastle-on-Tyne to Carlisle, which, with its fourteen bridges, was completed in 1752, and was commended as one of the straightest and best laid-out roads in the kingdom.

On 2 August 1751 Debbieg was promoted to be sub-engineer on the establishment, and was sent to Chatham, where he was employed on the defences. His plan of Chatham lines, dated 1755, is in the British Museum. On 1 September 1756 he received a commission as lieutenant in the 37th foot, then serving in Germany, and in the following year returned to survey work in Scotland. On 14 May 1757 he became a lieutenant in the Royal Engineers.

=== Seven Years' War ===
Debbieg was promoted to captain-lieutenant on 4 January 1758, and shortly after proceeded on active service to North America. He arrived at Halifax, Nova Scotia, on 9 May, and joined the expedition under Major-General Jeffery Amherst (afterwards Lord Amherst) against Louisbourg. He took part in the action on landing at Cape Breton on 8 June, and was assistant quartermaster-general under James Wolfe at the Siege of Louisbourg from 11 June until its capitulation on 26 July. The siege was a difficult one, and Debbieg, who was a man after Wolfe's own heart, resolute and daring, giving little heed to rule or system where they interfered with his views of the best mode of attack, had many opportunities of displaying his valuable qualities. He was promoted to be captain on 17 March 1759.

He served under Wolfe as assistant quartermaster-general throughout the campaign of 1759 in Canada, was present at the Siege of Quebec from 10 July to 18 September, at the repulse of Montmoency on 31 July, at the Battle of the Plains of Abraham on 13 September, and in the operations which terminated with the capitulation of the garrison at Quebec on 18 September. During the actual siege he temporarily gave up his appointment on Wolfe's staff to take his share of the engineer duties. He was with Wolfe when he fell, and figures in Benjamin West's painting of the incident.

Debbieg was at the Battle of Sillery on 28 April 1760, and served in the stubborn defence of Quebec against the French until the siege was raised on 17 May. Subsequently, he took part in the operations to complete the subjugation of Canada, ending with the capitulation of Montreal on 8 September. He accompanied the army to Halifax, Nova Scotia, where he acted for a time as chief engineer during the absence of Colonel Bastide.

In 1762, the French having seized Newfoundland, Debbieg accompanied the expedition sent to recapture it, landing with the troops at Torbay, nine miles from St. John's, under a heavy fire on 12 September. On the same day he took part in the action of Quiddy-Viddy and the attack on St. John's, which surrendered on the 18th, and with it the whole of Newfoundland. Debbieg sent home a plan of the operations of the troops, showing the town, harbour, and vicinity of St. John's. He repaired the defences and designed new works to replace some which had become obsolete. In 1763 he extended his surveys to Grace and Carboniere harbour in Conception Bay. In the following year he returned to England.

=== Military operations other than war ===
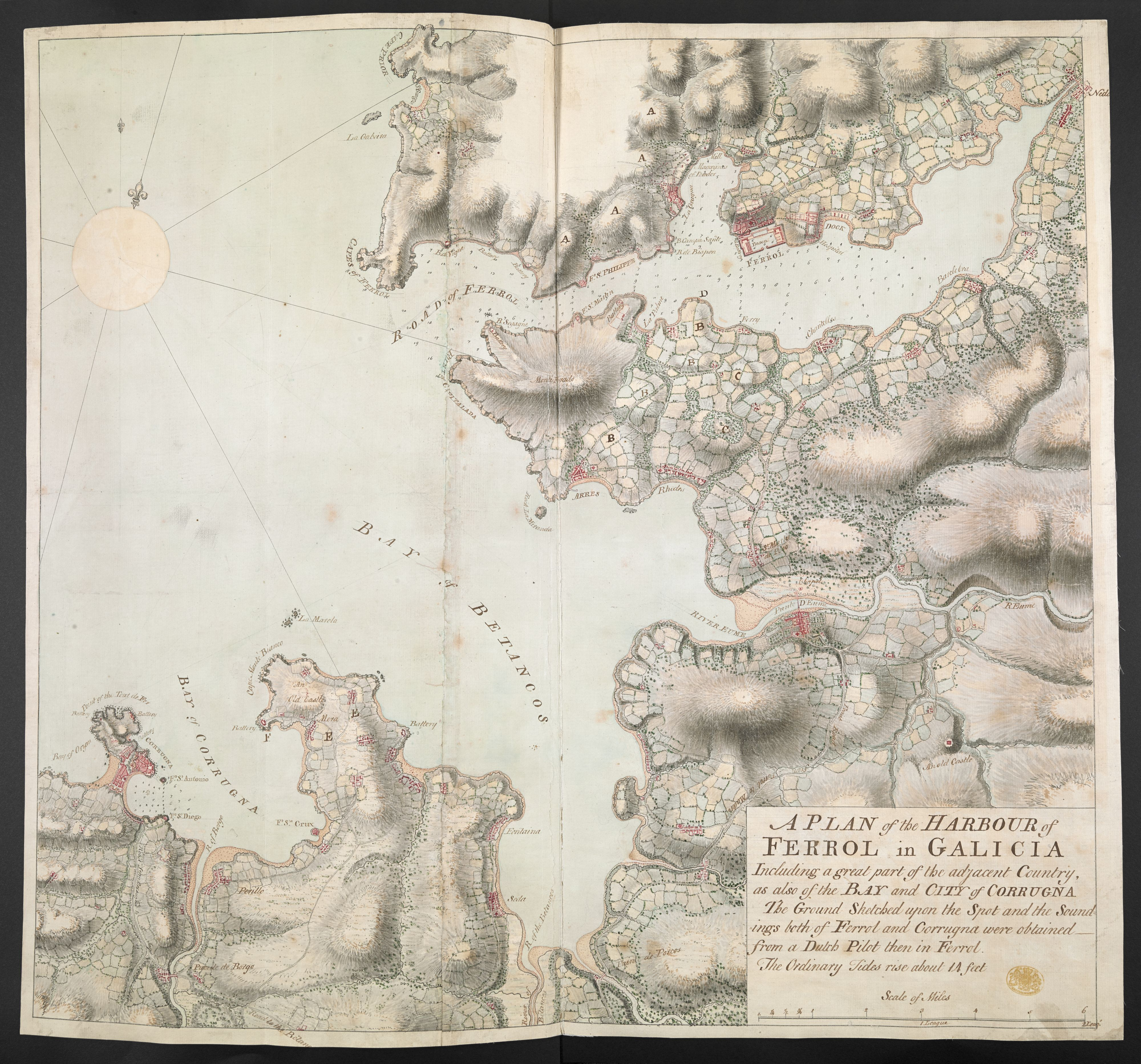
Plan of the Harbour of Ferrol in Galicia, showing the Bay and City of Corrugna (1767/8)

In 1765 he was appointed chief engineer in Newfoundland, but did not proceed thither until June 1766. In 1767 he was sent on a secret mission to France and Spain. He made plans of Barcelona, Carthagena, Cádiz, and Coruna, which are in the British Library, together with a manuscript entitled Remarks and Observations on several Seaports in Spain and France during a Journey in those Countries in 1767-1768. During these travels he was subjected to suspicion, ill-treatment, and confinement, for he was not at liberty to divulge his profession or the purpose of his travels. His mission was, however, successfully accomplished, and for his efficiency, ardour, and tact George III granted him a pension for life of 1l. per diem on 10 March 1769.

In this year he served on the committee of engineers at Westminster to report on the works necessary to complete the defences of Gibraltar. In the meantime his proposals for the defence of Newfoundland had been in abeyance on account of the cost, and at the end of 1770, having, much against his will, submitted an inferior but less costly scheme of defence, it was ordered to be carried out. On 23 July 1772 he was promoted to be brevet major, and during the next three years was employed in various secret missions, which he carried out to the satisfaction of the government.

In December 1775 he was appointed chief engineer in America on the application of Sir Guy Carleton (afterwards 1st Baron Dorchester) for his services for the defence of Quebec, but for reasons not now traceable he resigned the appointment. On 29 August 1777 he was promoted to be brevet lieutenant colonel, and in the autumn was selected as chief engineer on the staff of Jeffrey, Lord Amherst, commander-in-chief. On 17 March 1778, in addition to his staff duties, he was appointed chief engineer at Chatham. He carried out the approved designs by Desmaretz and Skinner for the defence of Chatham, but criticised them unfavourably. He constructed a military bridge across the Thames between Tilbury and Gravesend, formed of barges so arranged that a cut could be easily made for navigation. This bridge was maintained until the invasion scare had passed. In 1779 his proposed additions to the defences of Chatham and Sheerness were ordered to be carried out. He invented a movable chevaux de frise and a machine on wheels for defending a breach, an engraving of which is given in Grose's Military Antiquities.

Debbieg proposed to raise a corps of military artificers at home on the model of the companies at Gibraltar, and developed the project in a letter to Lord Amherst dated 30 July 1779, but the proposal was not favourably received at the time, although eight years later it was adopted.

When Lord George Gordon decided, at the meeting of 29 May 1780, to march on 2 June with a "no popery" mob to the House of Commons, Lord Amherst committed to Debbieg the task of placing the public buildings in London in a state of defence. Little time was available; but when, five days later, the riots commenced he had been able to take effectual measures for the protection of the Bank of England, the British Museum, and other public buildings and offices, as well as the New River Head. On the 3rd, and again on 7 June, he assisted Colonel Twistleton in defending the Bank of England against the mob, who, finding the principal public buildings prepared for defence, wreaked their vengeance on Roman Catholic chapels and the houses of public men who had supported the relief of Roman Catholics. The riots ceased on 7 June as soon as the king ordered active military measures, but Debbieg continued to exercise his metropolitan responsibility until early in July, when trade and tranquillity were completely re-established. In the meantime he furnished the Bank of England with plans and estimates for making the buildings permanently, secure.

At the manœuvres of 1780 the king complimented Debbieg on the rapidity with which he threw three bridges across the Thames below Gravesend, by which the whole army was quickly transferred from Essex to Kent. In October Debbieg submitted to Lord Sandwich a proposal to close Gillingham Creek, and to improve the navigation of the Medway at Chatham. The idea was in advance of the time, but was carried out eighty years later. He also proposed, in January 1781, a new pontoon equipment, which was adopted by the board of ordnance and continued in use for many years.

On 24 January 1781 Debbieg was promoted to be sub-director and major in the royal engineers, and on 20 November 1782 to be colonel. It was about this time that he selected for his clerk William Cobbett, then a recruit in one of the depot battalions at Chatham.

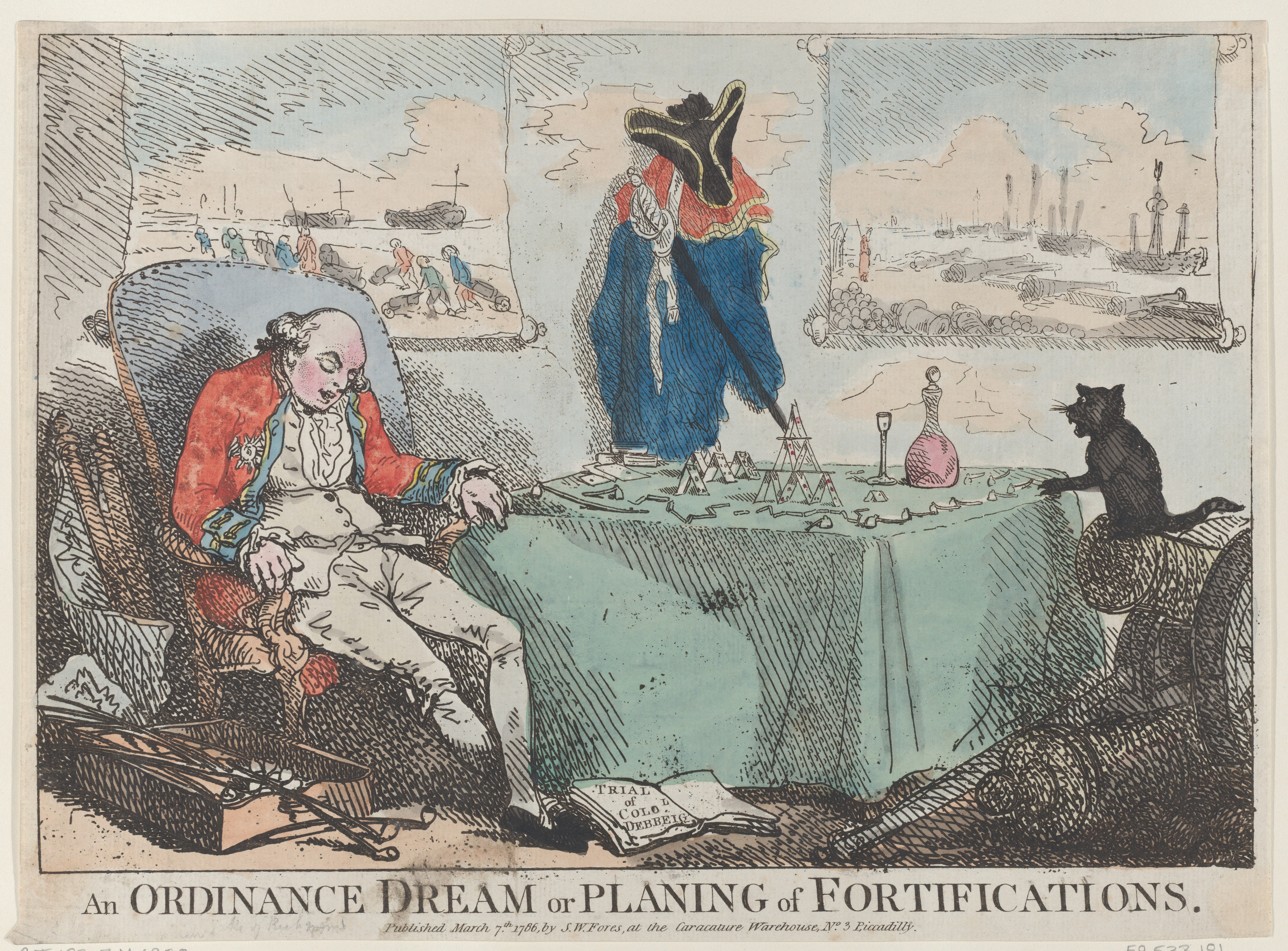
Thomas Rowlandson, An Ordinance Dream or Planning of Fortifications (7 March 1786)

On the Duke of Richmond becoming master-general of the ordnance in March 1782, Debbieg, who had had some passages of arms with him on the subject of defence, and had been attacked by him in the House of Lords in the previous November, found, or fancied he found, his position slighted and his official representations ignored; and when the duke obtained a royal warrant for the reduction and reorganisation of the Royal Engineers in 1784, by which the emoluments of the colonels were very largely reduced, Debbieg's hot temper and outspokenness got the better of his judgment, and he wrote a private letter to the duke, couched in such strong terms that he was tried by a general court-martial, and sentenced to be reprimanded. In the following year the House of Commons nominated Debbieg to be a member of the board of land and sea officers to report on the defences of the kingdom, but the duke refused to allow him to serve, and for some years he was unemployed. Having worked out and submitted a scheme of considerable merit and breadth of view for the defence of the kingdom, of which no notice whatever was taken, he wrote another intemperate letter to the duke, dated 16 March 1789, and published it in the Gazetteer. He was again tried by a general court-martial, and sentenced to be deprived of rank and pay for six months. This incident is referred to in the Rolliad in the lines beginning:

Learn, thoughtless Debbieg, now no more a youth,
The woes unnumbered that encompass truth.

=== Later life and death ===
His conduct does not seem to have been considered very serious, for he was received at court before his six months' suspension had expired, and was promoted to be major general on 12 October 1793, and lieutenant general on 1 January 1798. Much to his indignation he was posted to the Invalid Engineers on 31 August 1799. On 15 March 1800 the King granted him a special additional pension in consideration of his services, and he was promoted to be general on 25 September 1803.

Debbieg married Jannet Seton, a sister of Sir Henry Seton, 4th Baronet, of Abercorn. They had three sons: Hugh, Henry and Clement. Debbieg died at his residence in Margaret Street, Cavendish Square, London, on 27 May 1810, leaving two sons in the army: Clement (died 18 April 1819), in the 57th foot, and Henry, in the 44th foot, who became a lieutenant colonel and fort major of Dartmouth Castle. His wife died in March 1801.

== Sources ==
- Royal Engineers' Records;
- Royal Engineers Journal, 1887;
- Gentleman's Magazine, 1789, 1801, 1810, 1819;
- European Magazine, 1789, 1790, 1810;
- Ann. Biog. 1836;
- Grose's Military Antiquities, vol. ii;
- Cornwallis's Correspondence, vol. iii;
- Notes and Queries, 1st ser., vol. v;
- Proceedings of General Courts-Martial, 1784 and 1789;
- Royal MSS., British Library;
- Board of Ordnance Papers.

== Bibliography ==
- Hots, Susan (2002). "Debbieg, Hugh, General". In A Biographical Dictionary of Civil Engineers in Great Britain and Ireland. Vol. 1. 1500 to 1830. London: The Institution of Civil Engineers, Thomas Telford Ltd. pp. 173–174.
- Kopperman, Paul E. (2008). "Debbieg, Hugh". In Oxford Dictionary of National Biography. Oxford: Oxford University Press. n.p.
- Porter, Whitworth (1889). "General Hugh Debbieg". In History of the Corps of Royal Engineers. Vol 2. London: Longmans, Green, and Co. pp. 394–397.
- Vetch, Robert Hamilton (1901). "Debbieg, Hugh" . In Lee, Sidney (ed.). Dictionary of National Biography (1st supplement). Vol. 2. London: Smith, Elder & Co. pp. 124–127.
- Seton, Bruce Gordon (1941). The House of Seton: A Study of Lost Causes. Vol. 2. Edinburgh: Lindsay & Macleod. p. 531.
