= Bruce Seton =

British actor (1909–1969)

Sir Bruce Seton Bt
- Born: 29 May 1909; Simla, British India
- Died: 28 September 1969 (aged 60); London, England
- Occupation: Actor
- Spouses: Tamara Desni (m. 1937; div. 1940) Antoinette Cellier (m. 1940)
- Children: 1
- Military career
- Allegiance: United Kingdom
- Branch: British Army
- Service years: 1929–1932; 1939–1945
- Rank: Major
- Service number: 44304
- Units: Black Watch; Cameronians (Scottish Rifles)
- Conflicts: Second World War
- Awards: Medal of Freedom (US)

Sir Bruce Lovat Seton, 11th Baronet (29 May 1909 – 28 September 1969) was a British actor and soldier. He is best remembered for his lead role in Fabian of the Yard.

== Early life ==
Bruce Lovat Seton was born in Simla, British India, the younger of two sons of Lieutenant-Colonel Sir Bruce Gordon Seton of Abercorn (1868–1934), 9th Baronet and his wife, Elma Armstrong (died 1960). He was educated at Edinburgh Academy and then trained at the Royal Military College, Sandhurst.

== Military career ==
Seton was commissioned into the Black Watch in 1929 as a second lieutenant, but resigned his commission in 1932. A brief interruption in his acting career came during the Second World War and in November 1939 he held the rank of captain in the 10th Battalion, Cameronians (Scottish Rifles), ending the war as major (temporary). His service number was 44304 and he was awarded the Medal of Freedom.

== Acting ==
Seton began his acting career in the chorus line at Drury Lane Theatre and starred in Ralph Ince's film Blue Smoke (1935) as Don Chinko.

He played Inspector Fabian of Scotland Yard in the television series Fabian of the Yard (1954–1956). The series was based on the career of the former Scotland Yard Detective Inspector Robert Fabian, who usually appeared briefly before the final fade-out to wind up the story.

Seton's last role was as the voice of Beadle in The Wonderful World of Disney (1962–1963).

He fenced and boxed in the Army and was a founder member with other actors of the Lord's Taverners, a charity which raises funds to support participation in cricket.

== Later career ==
In 1963, on 7 February, the death of his brother, Alexander "Sandy" Hay Seton (who had no male heirs), Bruce became the 11th Seton baronet. As Bruce also had no male heirs at the time of his death, in 1969, the title passed to his cousin, Christopher Bruce Seton (1909–1988). His address in the 1940s was 15 Learmonth Gardens in western Edinburgh.

== Personal life ==
Seton met actress Tamara Desni Willhelm (1911–2008) on the set of Blue Smoke in 1935, in which both had leading roles. He became her second husband in 1937 in London, and divorced in 1940.

He later married actress Antoinette Cellier (born Florence Antoinette Glossop Cellier). They had a daughter, Lydia Antoinette Gordon Seton (born 14 November 1941).

== Selected filmography ==
- Flame in the Heather (1935) – Murray
- Blue Smoke (1935) – Don Chinko
- The Vandergilt Diamond Mystery (1936) – Hardcastle
- Wedding Group (1936) – Dr. Jock Carnegie
- The Demon Barber of Fleet Street (1936) – Mark
- Melody of My Heart (1936) – Jim Brent
- The End of the Road (1936) – Donald Carson
- Jack of All Trades (1936) – Dancer (uncredited)
- Love from a Stranger (1937) – Ronald Bruce
- Cafe Colette (1937) – Roger Manning
- Racing Romance (1937) – Harry Stone
- Fifty-Shilling Boxer (1937) – Jack Foster
- Father Steps Out (1937) – Johnnie Miller
- The Green Cockatoo (1937) – Madison – Tall Henchman
- Weddings Are Wonderful (1938) – John Smith
- You're the Doctor (1938) – Appleby
- If I Were Boss (1938) – Steve
- Miracles Do Happen (1939) – Rodney Gilmore
- Annie Laurie (1939) – Jamie Turner
- Old Mother Riley Joins Up (1939) – Lt. Travers
- Lucky to Me (1939) – Lord 'Tiny' Tyneside
- Return to Yesterday (1940) – Journalist (uncredited)
- The Middle Watch (1940) – Captain Randall
- The Curse of the Wraydons (1946) – Jack Wraydon / Spring-Heeled Jack
- Bond Street (1948) – Sergeant
- The Story of Shirley Yorke (1948) – Captain Sharp
- Bonnie Prince Charlie (1948) – Allan Macrae (uncredited)
- Scott of the Antarctic (1948) – Lt. H. Pennell R.N.
- Look Before You Love (1948) – Johns
- Whisky Galore! (1949) – Sergeant Odd
- The Blue Lamp (1950) – PC Campbell
- Paul Temple's Triumph (1950) – Bill Bryant
- Seven Days to Noon (1950) – Brigadier Grant (uncredited)
- Portrait of Clare (1950) – Lord Steven Wolverbury
- Blackmailed (1951) – Supt. Crowe
- Worm's Eye View (1951) – Squadron Leader Briarly
- White Corridors (1951) – Policeman
- High Treason (1951)
- Take Me to Paris (1951) – Gerald Vane
- Emergency Call (1952) – Sgt. Bellamy
- The Second Mrs Tanqueray (1952) – Gordon Jayne
- The Cruel Sea (1953) – Tallow
- Mogambo (1953) – Wilson (uncredited)
- Eight O'Clock Walk (1954) – D. C. I.
- Doctor in the House (1954) – Police Driver (uncredited)
- Delayed Action (1954) – Sellars
- Man of the Moment (1955) – Fabian of the Yard (uncredited)
- Breakaway (1956) – Webb
- Morning Call (1957) – Inspector S.G. Brown
- There's Always a Thursday (1957) – James Pelly
- West of Suez (1957) – Major Osborne
- The Crooked Sky (1957) – Inspector 'Mac' Macauley
- Undercover Girl (1958) – Ted Austin
- The Heart of a Man (1959) – River Police Inspector (uncredited)
- Strictly Confidential (1959) – Inspector Shearing
- Make Mine a Million (1959) – Supt. James
- Violent Moment (1959) – Inspector Davis
- The 39 Steps (1959) – Policeman on Train (uncredited)
- Life in Danger (1959) – George, the landlord
- John Paul Jones (1959) – 1st Villager
- Carry On Constable (1960) – (uncredited)
- Trouble with Eve (1960) – Col. Digby-Phillpotts
- Operation Cupid (1960) – Representative
- The League of Gentlemen (1960) – Patrolman (uncredited)
- Just Joe (1960) – Charlie
- Freedom to Die (1961) – Felix
- Gorgo (1961) – Prof. Flaherty
- Greyfriars Bobby: The True Story of a Dog (1961) – Prosecutor
- The Frightened City (1961) – Assistant Commissioner
- Ambush in Leopard Street (1962) – Nimmo
- The Pot Carriers (1962) – Prison Officer I / C Cell Block
- Dead Man's Evidence (1962) – Colonel James Somerset
- Dr. Syn, Alias the Scarecrow (1963) – Beadle

== Honours ==
- 7 February 1963 Baronet, 11th baronet, of Abercorn (cr. 1663)
- 1947 Medal of Freedom

=== Arms ===
Coat of arms of Bruce Seton

== Sources ==
- Burke's Peerage & Gentry, 107th edition

Baronetage of Nova Scotia
Preceded by Alexander Seton	Baronet (of Abercorn); 1963–1969	Succeeded by Christopher Seton
