= Collinson and Dean =

British comedy double act 1920s–1930s

Cigarette card showing Dean (left) and Collinson

Collinson and Dean were a British comedy double act popular during the 1920s and 1930s. They were Will Collinson (born William Valentine Malivoire; 14 February 1882 – June 1958) and Alfie Dean (born Alfred Corfield; 7 March 1902 – 22 September 1948).

London-born Collinson had toured Britain, Australia and America as a comedy sketch writer and performer, before he established a working partnership with Alfie Dean in 1925. Dean had started his own career as a juvenile performer in 1915, and the contrast between the pair's ages and height (Collinson was tall, Dean was short) formed part of the basis of their humour. Collinson was a blustery and middle-aged straight man, while Dean goaded him with inane questions, quips, puns and non sequiturs. Unlike many other double acts such as Flanagan and Allen, the audience never felt that Collinson and Dean had an underlying affection for one another, more that they were obliged to co-exist. The pair featured in many short films in the 1930s, several of which are still readily available online. They broadcast regularly on BBC radio, and appeared at the Royal Variety Performance in 1933.

Their partnership ended in 1938, and Dean joined the military at the start of the Second World War. Collinson continued to perform, as Collinson and Breen, with a new partner, Bobby Breen, who (at about 4 feet 9 inches (1.45 m)) was even shorter than Dean. Rather than continuing the format of a succession of jokes, they used the device of Collinson attempting to teach Breen a new skill. They remained popular, broadcasting through the war into the early 1950s, and appeared regularly in pantomimes.

After the end of the war, Dean worked as a foil to comedian Sid Field, and appeared in a second Royal Variety Performance in 1946. He featured in the 1948 Terry-Thomas film A Date with a Dream, and in London Town and Cardboard Cavalier with Sid Field (released after Dean's death, and shortly before that of Field, its star). In July 1948, Dean suffered serious head injuries when he was hit by a car; although he seemed to be making a recovery, he died two months later from a blood clot on the brain, aged 46. Collinson died in 1958, aged 76.
