= Selten =

Selten is a surname. Notable people with the surname include:

- Morton Selten (1860–1939), English actor
- Reinhard Selten (1930–2016), German economist
