= Cardboard Cavalier =

1949 British film by Walter Forde

- Directed by: Walter Forde
- Written by: Noel Langley
- Produced by: Walter Forde; Culley Forde
- Starring: Sid Field; Margaret Lockwood; Jerry Desmonde
- Cinematography: Jack Hildyard
- Edited by: Alan Jaggs
- Music by: Lambert Williamson
- Production company: Two Cities Films
- Distributed by: General Film Distributors
- Release date: 29 March 1949
- Running time: 96 minutes
- Country: United Kingdom
- Language: English

Cardboard Cavalier is a 1948 British historical comedy film directed by Walter Forde and starring Sid Field, Margaret Lockwood and Jerry Desmonde. It was written by Noel Langley.

It was the last film for Forde and Field. Field died of a heart attack shortly after the film was released.

== Plot ==
In an England under the rule of Oliver Cromwell, London barrow boy Sidcup Buttermeadow is unwittingly used as a spy for the exiled Charles II to deliver messages to his royalist supporters, and is aided by the object of his affection, Nell Gwynn.

Dressed as a Cavalier, Sidcup is pursued by Roundhead troops, but evades them with the help of a variety of people and a ghost.

When Charles is eventually restored as king, Sid is knighted and gets to kiss Nell Gwynn.

== Cast ==
- Sid Field as Sidcup Buttermeadow
- Margaret Lockwood as Nell Gwynne
- Jerry Desmonde as Colonel Lovelace
- Jack McNaughton as Uriah Group
- Brian Worth as Tom Pride
- Edmund Willard as Oliver Cromwell
- Mary Clare as Milady Doverhouse
- Alfie Dean as Murdercasket
- Anthony Hulme as Charles II
- Miles Malleson as Judge Gorebucket
- Irene Handl as the ghost of Lady Agnes
- Joan Young as Maggie
- Claude Hulbert as Sylvester Clutterbuck
- Michael Brennan as Brother Barebones
- Peter Bull as Mosspot
- Vincent Holman as Lord Doverhouse
- John Salew as Smug

== Production ==
The film was part of an ambitious production programme from J. Arthur Rank to meet an increased quota for British films. His intent was to make 60 over 12 months.

Sid Field's casting was announced in June 1948. He made the movie after a six-month tour of the US. Field's previous film, London Town, had been a big flop but his popularity on stage encouraged Rank to try him again in films.

Pat Roc was meant to play the role of Nell Gwynn but reportedly turned it down and was replaced by Margaret Lockwood, who was keen to play comedy again after making a number of dramas. Field's son was born during filming on 5 August.

Filming started in June 1948. It was made at Denham Studios. Production of the film was interrupted by a strike from crew members in protest over recent sackings of film workers. Cast member Alfie Dean died as the result of an off-set accident during the period of filming.

Filming ended in January 1949. Lockwood wrote in her memoirs that "we had a romp of a time with Sid Field." In Picturegoer Lockwood said: "I was terribly distressed when I read the press notices of the film."

== Reception ==
The Monthly Film Bulletin wrote: "From beginning to end the film is farce and slapstick, even to the throwing of custard pies. It is not altogether pleasing, since the talents of Sid Field are easily adequate, employed in the right way, without slapstick. He is funny, but he is seen at his best only once. Margaret Lockwood seems greatly to enjoy herself, but slapstick comedy does not become her. The small part of the ghost, amusingly played by Irene Handl, is worthy of mention; Jerry Desmonde is also quite good as Lovelace. The settings are average, the dialogue, script and story are very sketchy, and production and direction only adequate. This film provides mildly amusing entertainment as a skit on present-day regulations and restrictions."

Kine Weekly wrote: "Director Walter Forde and script-writer Noel Langley have taken a turning point in English history and converted it into side-splitting burlesque by employing current gags and using modern colloquialisms against ambitious near-authentic sets. ... No film to our knowledge has displayed a greater sense of the ridiculous."

Picture Show wrote: "Robustly directed and acted with considerable gusto ... Sid Field makes the most of his material, and Margaret Lockwood is a beautiful hoyden."

Variety spoke of Langley's script "blend[ing] comedy, bathos and sheer slapstick with skill and ingenuity" and also highlighted Lockwood as playing her role with "great gusto...verve and vivacity".

The critic Derek Winnert noted that the film was "well timed, sprightly and funny, and exuberantly played by a welcome vintage cast, as well as amusingly written by Noel Langley and nicely directed by the comedy expert Forde."

The film was banned in Syria in 1953.
