= Sara Sloane =

Sara Sloane may refer to:

- Ursula Bloom (1892–1984), British writer who used Sara Sloane as a pseudonym
- A character in an episode of The Simpsons, "A Star Is Born Again"
