= Melangkap Uprising =

1893 rebellion in North Borneo

Date	1893
Location	Melangkap, North Borneo 6.308455938979022°N 116.76288387991573°E

Belligerents
North Borneo Chartered Company	Melangkap Rebels

Commanders and leaders
(North Borneo) George Ormsby	Aki Gumboi; Aki Lengkatu

Units involved
British North Borneo Constabulary	

The Melangkap Uprising was an armed conflict in North Borneo by the local population against the rule of the North Borneo Chartered Company in the kampung of Melangkap (also spelled Melankap). This rebellion was led by the Dusun Tindal warrior Aki Gumboi and his younger brother, Aki Lengkatu. These two men were honored with the status of "Heroes of Sabah" in 2025. Contrary to most colonial narratives of the era, including those written by Owen Rutter which state that "the country was at peace" in 1893, the Melangkap Uprising occurred during that year.
