= Seton baronets of Abercorn (1663) =

Baronetcy in Linlithgow county, Scotland

Arms of Seton of Abercorn

The Seton baronetcy, of Abercorn in the County of Linlithgow, was created in the Baronetage of Nova Scotia on 3 June 1663 for Walter Seton, son of Alexander Seton, Lord Kilcreuch, with remainder to heirs male whatsoever. At the time he owned the Barony of Abercorn. He was a Customer (customs farmer) for the King.

In 1923 the 9th Baronet, petitioned the Crown for his right to the title of Lord Gordon. The Committee for Privileges of the House of Lords admitted that he was the heir male of the 1st Earl of Huntly, but decided that he had not provided enough evidence of the creation and existence of the title of Lord Gordon. The 11th Baronet was the actor Bruce Seton.

== Seton baronets, of Abercorn (1663) ==
- Sir Walter Seton, 1st Baronet (died 1692)
- Sir Walter Seton, 2nd Baronet (died 1708)
- Sir Henry Seton, 3rd Baronet (died 1751)
- Sir Henry Seton, 4th Baronet (died 1788)
- Sir Alexander Seton, 5th Baronet (1772–1810)
- Sir Henry John Seton, 6th Baronet (1796–1868)
- Sir Charles Hay Seton, 7th Baronet (1797–1869)
- Sir Bruce Maxwell Seton, 8th Baronet (1836–1915)
- Sir Bruce Gordon Seton, FRSE 9th Baronet (1868–1932)
- Sir Alexander Hay Seton, 10th Baronet (1904–1963)
- Sir Bruce Lovat Seton, 11th Baronet (1909–1969)
- Sir Christopher Bruce Seton, 12th Baronet (1909–1988)
- Sir Iain Bruce Seton, 13th Baronet (1942–2025)
- Laurence Bruce Seton, 14th Baronet (born 1968)

The heir apparent is the present holder's son Liam James Seton (born 2000).
