= Falling for You (film) =

1933 British comedy film

- Opening title card
- Directed by: Robert Stevenson; Jack Hulbert
- Screenplay by: Jack Hulbert; Douglas Furber; Robert Stevenson; Additional dialogue: Claude Hulbert
- Based on: story by Sidney Gilliat
- Starring: Jack Hulbert; Cicely Courtneidge
- Cinematography: Bernard Knowles
- Edited by: R.E. Dearing
- Music by: Music: Vivian Ellis; Lyrics: Douglas Furber; Musical director: Louis Levy
- Production companies: Gainsborough Pictures; Gaumont British Picture Corporation
- Distributed by: Woolf & Freedman Film Service
- Release dates: 15 June 1933 (London, England)
- Running time: 88 minutes
- Country: England
- Language: English

Falling for You is a 1933 British comedy film directed by Robert Stevenson and Jack Hulbert, and starring Jack Hulbert and Cicely Courtneidge.

== Plot ==
Rival journalists Jack and Minnie (Hulbert and Courtneidge) compete for a scoop about a missing heiress (Tamara Desni). When they track her down to Switzerland, Jack falls for her and Minnie gets to write up the story.

== Cast ==
- Jack Hulbert as Jack Hazeldon
- Cicely Courtneidge as Minnie Tucker
- Tamara Desni as Sondra von Moyden
- Garry Marsh as Archduke Karl
- Alfred Drayton as News editor
- Toni Edgar-Bruce as Aunt Alice (as Tonie Bruce)
- O. B. Clarence as Trubshawe
- Morton Selten as Caldicott
- Ivor McLaren as The Sweep (as Ivor McClaren)
- Leo Sheffield as The Butler

== Critical reception ==
TV Guide gave it two out of five stars, and wrote, "Okay comedy features Hulbert singing three songs and dancing on skis."
