= Heaven Is Round the Corner =

1944 British musical film

Heaven Is round the Corner
- Directed by: Maclean Rogers
- Screenplay by: Austin Melford
- Produced by: Friedrich Zelnik
- Starring: Will Fyffe; Leni Lynn; Austin Trevor
- Cinematography: James Wilson
- Edited by: Donald Ginsberg
- Music by: Kennedy Russell
- Production company: British National Films
- Release date: 10 April 1944
- Running time: 100 minutes
- Country: United Kingdom
- Language: English

Heaven is Round the Corner is a 1944 British musical film, directed by Maclean Rogers and starring Will Fyffe, Leni Lynn, Leslie Perrins, and Austin Trevor. It was written by Austin Melford and made by British National Films.

== Plot ==
A country girl goes to Paris to sing professionally, where she falls in love with a member of the British Embassy. They are parted by the outbreak of the Second World War, but subsequently reunited again.

== Cast ==
- Will Fyffe as Dougal
- Leni Lynn as Joan Sedley
- Austin Trevor as John Cardew
- Magda Kun as Musette
- Peter Glenville as Donald McKay
- Barbara Waring as Dorothy Trevor
- Leslie Perrins as Robert Sedley
- Barbara Couper as Mrs. Trevor
- Toni Edgar-Bruce as Mrs. Harcourt
- Hugh Dempster as Captain Crowe
- Paul Bonifas as Rostond
- Jan Van Loewen as Titoni
- Rosamund Greenwood as maid
- Elsa Tee as Nora Thompson
- Marcel de Haes as Louis

== Music ==
The film's music was by Kennedy Russell, with lyrics by Desmond O'Connor. The title song, sung in the film by contralto Leni Lynn, was listed among Britain's bestselling sheet music titles in June 1944.

== Reception ==
The Monthly Film Bulletin wrote: "Though this film has emotional appeal, further reflection shows that its continuity and the performances of the chief characters is poor. Were it not for the all too short appearances of Will Fyffe, the film would have no merits. Leni Lynn has a voice, and that is about all. The other characters are wooden and the situations stereotyped. The theme song, however, is tuneful."

Kine Weekly wrote: "Generously tailored and lavishly trimmed Cinderella type comedy drama, complete with appropriate and tuneful music and song, tabulating the many tender domestic and romantic vicissitudes of a pretty and talented young singer. Leni Lynn's charming and ingratiating personality and delightful singing, Will Fyffe's kindly humour, the cleverly contrasted rural England and Gay Paree settings, catchy signature tune, delightful directorial touches and deft musical accompaniment happily convert its timehonoured, but elegant subterfuge into clean and colourful popular light entertainment. It's a glittering gift for the gods. Capital British light booking, particularly for industrial provincial and family audiences."

Variety wrote: ""Will Fyffe admirers won't believe their eyes if and when they see this opus. Fyffe is on the screen most of the picture, yet his role, that of a colorless farmhand, could have been safely left to a bit player. Pic for lower half of duals, and for British audiences only."
