= Once in a New Moon =

1935 British film by Anthony Kimmins

- Opening titles
- Directed by: Anthony Kimmins
- Written by: Anthony Kimmins; Owen Rutter (novel)
- Starring: Eliot Makeham; René Ray; Morton Selten
- Production company: Fox Film Company
- Distributed by: Fox Film Company
- Release date: 1935
- Running time: 63 minutes
- Country: United Kingdom
- Language: English

Once in a New Moon is a 1935 British science fiction film directed by Anthony Kimmins and starring Eliot Makeham, René Ray and Morton Selten. It was written by Kimmins based on the 1929 novel Lucky Star by Owen Rutter, and was a quota quickie, made at Shepperton Studios.

== Plot ==
When a dead star passes planet Earth, its magnetic pull dislodges the (fictitious) English town of Shrimpton-on-the-Sea and causes it to break away and become its own miniature globe in orbit around the Earth. The village is now an island, the only land, and the rest of the mini planet is water which can be circumnavigated in a day. Sail straight and you eventually find the town again. The sun rises and sets every few hours and the Earth can be seen as a new moon in the sky. Otherwise, life is as before.

As panic sets in, the inhabitants of the village set about forming a government. However, conflicts arise between the local aristocracy and the villagers and lead the population of the newly named Shrimpton-in-Space to the brink of civil war.

== Cast ==
- Eliot Makeham as Harold Drake
- René Ray as Stella Drake
- Morton Selten as Lord Bravington
- Wally Patch as Syd Parrott
- Derrick De Marney as Honorable Bryan-Grant
- John Clements as Edward Teale
- Mary Hinton as Lady Bravington
- Gerald Barry as Coonel. Fitzgeorge
- Richard Goolden as Reverend Benjamin Buffett
- Harold Saxon-Snell as K. Pilkington-Bigge
- John Turnbull as Captain Crump
- William Fazan
- Ralph Howard
- Franklyn Kelsey
- Vernon Kelso
- Cecil Landau
- Charles Paton
- Walter Roy
- Thorley Walters

== Critical reception ==
Kine Weekly wrote: "Acting, presentation, and character drawing are all live and give credence to the improbable theme, which is very well argued. Essentially a quota booking of value in the better-class programme and one which is not without popular appeal."

Picture Show called it "an entertaining picture".

In British Sound Films: The Studio Years 1928–1959 David Quinlan rated the film as "average", writing: "Way-out fantasy, unusual for its time."
