= Hullabaloo (film) =

1940 film by Edwin L. Marin

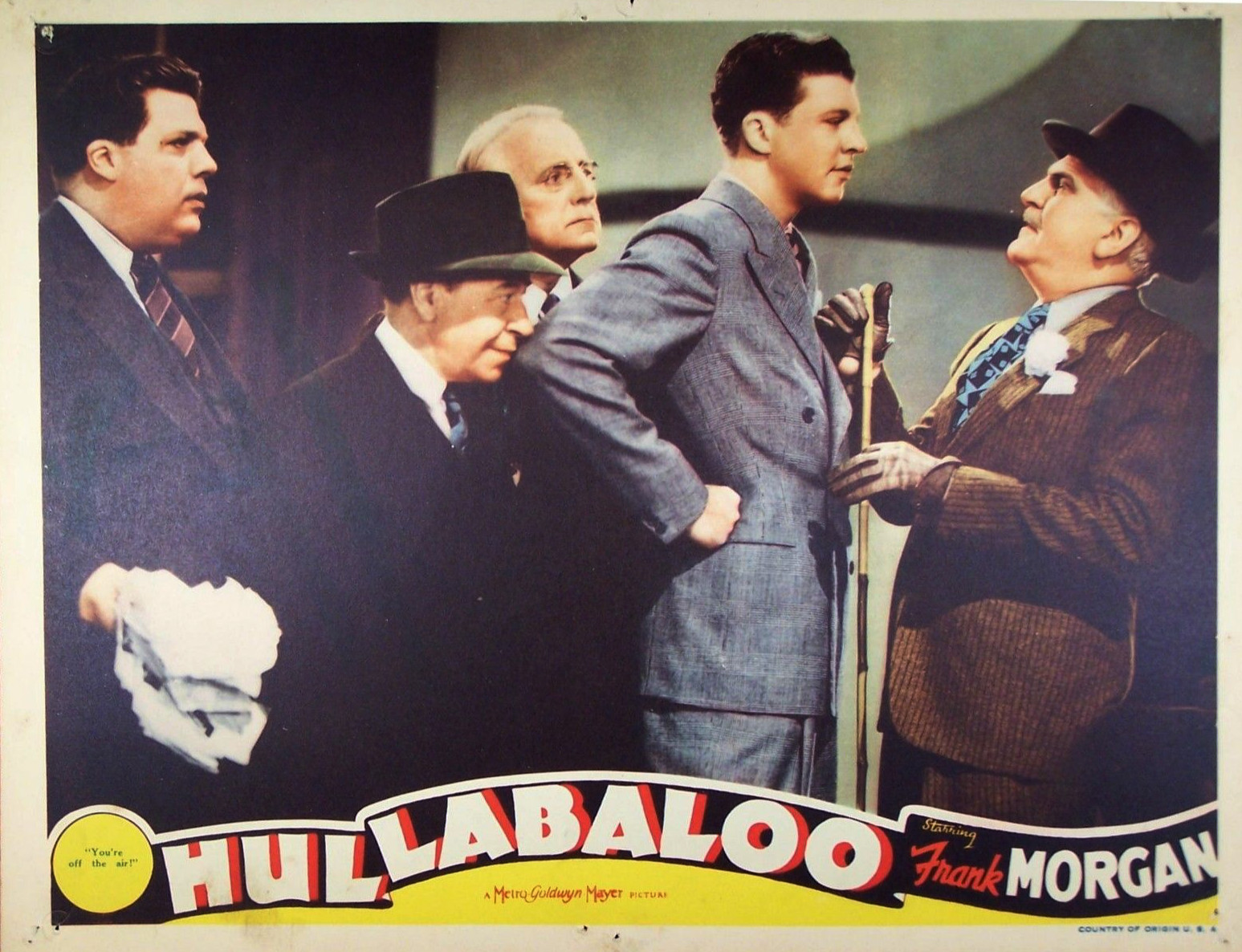
- Lobby card
- Directed by: Edwin L. Marin
- Screenplay by: Nat Perrin; Dorothy Yost
- Story by: Bradford Ropes; Val Burton
- Produced by: Louis K. Sidney
- Starring: Frank Morgan; Virginia Grey; Dan Dailey
- Cinematography: Charles Lawton Jr.
- Edited by: Conrad A. Nervig
- Music by: George Bassman
- Production company: Metro-Goldwyn-Mayer
- Distributed by: Loew's Inc.
- Release date: October 25, 1940
- Running time: 78 minutes
- Country: United States
- Language: English

Hullabaloo is a 1940 American musical comedy film directed by Edwin L. Marin and written by Nat Perrin. It stars Frank Morgan, Virginia Grey, Dan Dailey, Billie Burke, Donald Meek, Reginald Owen, and Connie Gilchrist. Jack Albertson, Leo Gorcey, and Arthur O'Connell appear in bit roles.

== Plot ==
Morgan is the star of the film, as fading actor Frankie Merriweather, who is trying to revive his career by starring on a radio program. When his most recent broadcast, a science fiction invasion from Mars story, panics the nation, he is fired. He decides to jumpstart his career by creating a new show which features his talented children.

== Cast ==
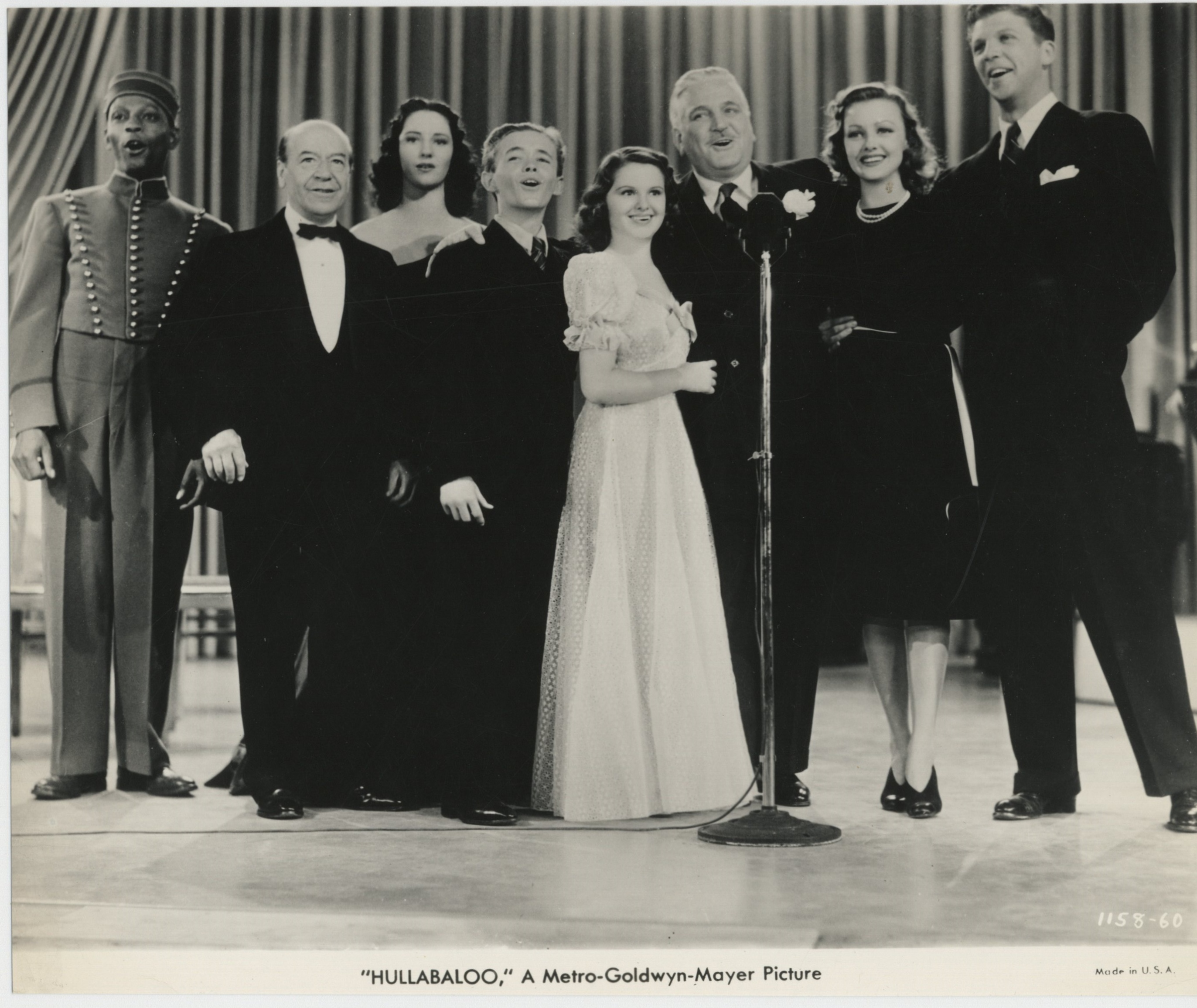
Hullabaloo (1940) publicity still

- Frank Morgan as Frankie Merriweather
- Virginia Grey as Laura Merriweather
- Dan Dailey as Bob Strong
- Billie Burke as Penny Merriweather
- Nydia Westman as Lulu Perkins
- Ann Morriss as Wilma Norton
- Donald Meek as Clyde Perkins
- Reginald Owen as Buzz Foster
- Charles Holland as Singing Bellhop
- Leni Lynn as Judy Merriweather
- Virginia O'Brien as Virginia Ferris
- Curt Bois as Armand Francois
- Sara Haden as Sue Merriweather
- Larry Nunn as Terry Merriweather
- Barnett Parker as Samuel Stephens
- Connie Gilchrist as Arline Merriweather
- Leo Gorcey as Apartment House Bellhop (uncredited)

== Production ==
A highlight of the film is Morgan's reenactment of the current MGM hit film Boom Town, with Morgan's character, Frank Merriweather, supposedly imitating the voices of the stars of that film. In fact, the Boom Town stars' voices were dubbed over Morgan's. The voices of Clark Gable, Claudette Colbert, Spencer Tracy, and Hedy Lamarr are used.
