= Leni Lynn =

American actress (1923–2010)

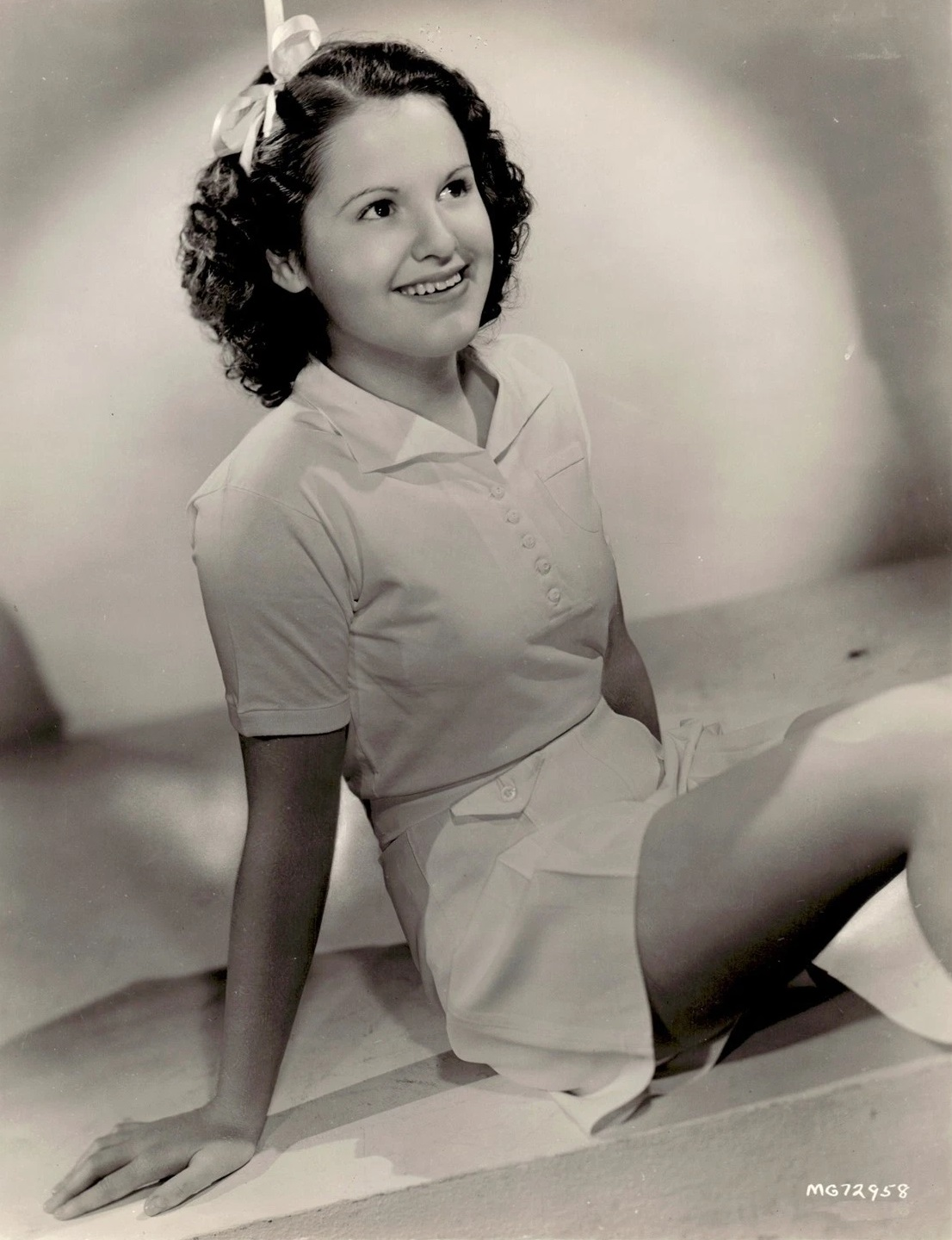
- Lynn in 1939
- Born: Angelica Ciofani; May 3, 1923; Waterbury, Connecticut
- Died: January 1, 2010 (aged 86); Croton-on-Hudson, New York
- Other name: Leni Hoffer
- Occupations: Actress, singer
- Parent(s): Francesco Ciofani; Carmelita Ciofani

Leni Lynn (born Angelina Ciofani; May 3, 1923 – January 1, 2010) was an American actress and a contralto singer. She was also known as Leni Hoffer.

The daughter of a Passaic, New Jersey, dye-goods factory worker, Francesco Ciofani, and his wife, Carmelita, who worked in a dress factory, Lynn learned to sing by listening to recordings. When she was 13, friends and neighbors in Pasaic contributed 10,000 dimes to send her to Hollywood to try for success in films. On September 6, 1938, she received a contract from MGM.

Lynn was married four times. In 1942, she married British insurance executive Edward Thomas Hopkin; they divorced on March 23, 1949. Her last husband, composer and conductor Bernard Hoffer, survived her.

On January 1, 2010, Lynn died of complications of a stroke in Croton-on-Hudson, New York. She was 86.

== Selected filmography ==
- Babes in Arms (1939)
- Hullabaloo (1940)
- Angels with Broken Wings (1941)
- Heaven Is Round the Corner (1944)
- Give Me the Stars (1945)
- Gaiety George (1946)
- Spring Song (1946)
