= The $64,000 Question (British game show) =

British TV game show (1956–1958, 1990–1993)

- Also known as: The 64,000 Question; The 64,000 Challenge
- Genre: Game show
- Presented by: Jerry Desmonde; Robin Bailey; Bob Monkhouse
- Country of origin: United Kingdom
- Original language: English
- No. of series: 3 (ATV); 4 (Central)
- No. of episodes: 85 (ATV); 52 (Central)

Production
- Running time: 30 minutes (inc. adverts)
- Production companies: ATV (1956–58); Central (1990–93)

Original release
- Network: ITV
- Release: 19 May 1956 – 18 January 1958
- Release: 1 June 1990 – 29 August 1993

Related
- The $64,000 Question

The $64,000 Question is a British quiz show based on the American format of the same name. The show originally ran from 19 May 1956 to 18 January 1958 produced by ATV and was originally hosted by Jerry Desmonde, and called simply The 64,000 Question with the top prize initially being 64,000 sixpences (£1,600), later doubling to 64,000 shillings (£3,200). After a successful pilot was shot on 15 November 1989, the programme was revived from 1 June 1990 to 29 August 1993 with Bob Monkhouse as the host and a higher £6,400 top prize.

== Format ==
=== Original ===
Jerry Desmonde was the host and former Detective Superintendent Robert Fabian was "custodian of the questions". Each contestant answered questions based on their subject of expertise. The first question earned 100 sixpences (£2/10/-), correctly answering the next question increased the player's winnings to 500 sixpences, or £12/10/-. Each of the next two questions featured two parts and answering both parts doubled the player's winnings to 1,000 sixpences (£25) and 2,000 sixpences (£50) respectively. The remaining questions featured three parts, then four parts, five parts, six parts, and the final question required at least seven parts to be answered correctly to win the top prize of 64,000 sixpences, or £1,600. In late 1956, while the values remained the same, the money increased from sixpences to shillings, for a top prize of £3,200 (64,000 shillings). £3,200 was higher, in real terms (i.e. accounting for inflation), than anything on offer on British TV for most of the 1960s, 1970s and 1980s, after the Independent Television Authority (later the Independent Broadcasting Authority) imposed prize limits on game shows after the general discrediting of the genre following the quiz show scandals in the US and rumours that the British version of Twenty-One was also corrupt.

=== Revival ===
The values started at £1, followed by questions valued at £25 and doubled with each subsequent question with £400 and £1,600 each being guaranteed. The £200 and £400 questions each featured two parts. The £800 question required three correct answers and the next question required four correct answers to secure £1,600. The contestant must then answer a follow-up question to attempt the five-part £3,200 question in a soundproof booth known as the "Isolator". The £6,400 question required six parts to answer correctly. On the £3,200 and £6,400 questions, missing one part required the contestant to answer a "reserve part" correctly. £6,400 was a significant amount of money for a British game show at that time, though still probably worth less than the original had, which was £3,200 (in former money). The 1991 series replaced the £1-£50 questions with the Basic 64 which started at £1 and doubled up to £64 guaranteed before the £100 question. In 1993, prize limits were lifted by the Independent Television Commission (paving the way for the eventual arrival of Who Wants to be a Millionaire? in 1998).

== Transmissions ==
=== ATV (1956–1958) ===
Series	Start date	End date	Episodes
1	19 May 1956	8 June 1957	54
2	15 June 1957	7 September 1957	13
3	14 September 1957	18 January 1958	18

Note: None of the ATV episodes survived.

=== Central (1990–1993) ===
Series	Start date	End date	Episodes
1	1 June 1990	24 August 1990	13
2	4 January 1991	29 March 1991	13
3	30 August 1991	22 November 1991	13
4	6 June 1993	29 August 1993	13
