= Tamara Desni =

British actress (1913–2008)

- Born: Tamara Brodsky; 22 October 1913; Berlin, Germany
- Died: 7 February 2008 (aged 94); Valence d'Agen, France
- Years active: 1931–1950
- Spouses: Hans Wilhelm (m. 1929; div. 1930) Bruce Seton (m. 1937; div. 1940) Roland Gillett (m. 1940; div. 1945) Raymond Lovell (m. 1947; div. 1951) Albert Lavagna (m. 1956; died 2002)
- Children: 2
- Parent: Xenia Desni

Tamara Desni (22 October 1913 – 7 February 2008) was a German-born British actress. She became a star of the London theatre stage and film in the 1930s. Her film career lasted until 1950.

== Biography ==
Desni was born in Berlin on 22 October 1913 as Tamara Brodsky, the daughter of actress Xenia Desni (1897–1962). Her mother was born in Kiev in the Russian Empire (present-day Ukraine), and during the Russian Revolution, she fled first to Constantinople, where she worked as a variety dancer, from there to Berlin and during the silent era she became a star of German cinema.

As a child, Desni studied ballet. While a teenager, director Erik Charell accepted her into his ensemble at the Großes Schauspielhaus in 1930. Desni enjoyed great success in his productions of Die lustige Witwe (The Merry Widow) and the legendary premiere of Ralph Benatzky's White Horse Inn, she married a dentist and appeared in her first three films. After the separation in 1931, she moved to Great Britain with her mother. She made her stage debut in Great Britain in 1931 in the operetta The White Horse Inn. She followed this up with another leading role in Benatzky's operetta Casanova at London Coliseum, featuring music by Johann Strauss, Jr.

Desni's film career took off in 1933 with Falling for You, and continued through 1950. Other film credits include Dick Barton at Bay, The Torso Murder Mystery, Fire Over England, and Hell's Cargo. In 1946, she appeared in the Durbridge film adaptation Send for Paul Temple.

== Marriages ==
Desni met her second husband, actor Bruce Seton, on the set of Blue Smoke in 1934. They married in Hendon in March 1937, but divorced in 1940. Eight days after her divorce, she married film producer Roland (Bill) Gillett, though that marriage was dissolved before the end of World War II. Her fourth marriage was to the Canadian-born actor Raymond Lovell in 1947, the two separating in 1951. Her stepdaughter during this short marriage was the actress Simone Lovell. In France, she met Albert Lavagna, a builder. They built the popular inn 'L'Auberge Chez Tamara', marrying in 1956, shortly after Desni discovered she was pregnant for the first time. They had two daughters.

== Death ==
Desni's health began declining while in her late eighties. She died, a widow, on 7 February 2008 in Valence d'Agen, France, aged 94.

== Filmography ==
Year	Title	Role	Notes
1931	Terror of the Garrison	Annemarie	
1931	In the Employ of the Secret Service	Natascha, hans datter	
1931	Marriage with Limited Liability		
1933	Falling for You	Sondra von Moyden	
1934	Jack Ahoy	Conchita	
1934	The Diplomatic Lover	Helen	
1934	Bypass to Happiness	Tamara	
1934	Forbidden Territory	Marie-Louise	
1935	McGlusky the Sea Rover	Flame	
1935	Dark World	Birgitta	
1935	Blue Smoke	Belle Chinko	
1936	Love in Exile	Tanya	
1937	Fire Over England	Elena	
1937	The Squeaker	Tamara	
1939	Traitor Spy	Marie Dufreyne	
1940	His Brother's Keeper	Olga	
1945	Flight from Folly	Nina	
1946	Send for Paul Temple	Diana Thornley	
1947	The Hills of Donegal	Carole Wells	
1950	Dick Barton at Bay	Anna	(final film role)
