= Barbara Waring =

English actress (1911–1990)

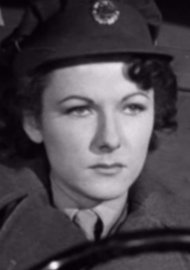
Barbara Waring

Barbara Waring (née Barbara Alice Waring Gibb; 1 August 1911 – April 1990) was an English actress, screenwriter, and playwright.

== Biography ==
Barbara Alice Waring Gibb was born on 1 August 1911 in Kent, England, the daughter of Dr. J. A. Gibb. She attended the Royal Academy of Dramatic Art, and was an actress in the 1930s and 1940s.

In the late 1930s she married Laurence A. Evans, a theatrical agent. They divorced and in 1947 she married the Hon. Geoffrey Cunliffe, son of Walter Cunliffe, 1st Baron Cunliffe, and Edith Cunningham Boothby, and Chairman of British Aluminium.

In 1963, she wrote the script for Two by the Sea and in 1974 that for Easter Tells Such Dreadful Lies. In 1967, she wrote the play The Jaywalker, performed at Coventry Cathedral with music by Duke Ellington.

She died in April 1990, aged 78, in Surrey, England.

== Appearances ==
- 1935: His Majesty and Company as Princess Sandra
- 1935: The Girl in the Crowd as Mannequin
- 1942: In Which We Serve as Mrs MacAdoo, written by Noël Coward and directed by Noël Coward and David Lean
- 1943: The Gentle Sex as Joan Simpson, directed and narrated by Leslie Howard
- 1944: A Canterbury Tale as Polly Finn
- 1944: Heaven Is Round the Corner as Dorothy Trevor
- 1945: Twilight Hour as Gladys
- 1947: Hungry Hill as Barbara Brodrick, with a screenplay by Terence Young and Daphne du Maurier, from the novel by Daphne du Maurier
