= Blue Smoke (1935 film) =

1935 British film by Ralph Ince

- Short-story film tie-in (Picture Show, 30 May 1936)
- Directed by: Ralph Ince
- Written by: Ingram D'Abbes; Roland Gillett; Fenn Shene
- Produced by: John Barrow
- Starring: Tamara Desni; Ralph Ince; Bruce Seton
- Cinematography: Alex Bryce
- Edited by: Reginald Beck
- Production company: Fox Film Company
- Distributed by: Fox Film Company
- Release date: December 1935
- Running time: 74 minutes
- Country: United Kingdom
- Language: English

Blue Smoke is a 1935 British comedy-drama film directed by Ralph Ince and starring Tamara Desni, Ince, and Bruce Seton. It was written by Ingram D'Abbes, Roland Gillett and Fenn Shene, and made at Wembley Studios by the British subsidiary of the Fox Film Company. The film's sets were designed by the art director Ralph W. Brinton.

== Preservation status ==
The British Film Institute National Archive holds a collection of ephemera and stills but no film or video materials.

== Plot ==
Don Chikno is a talented boxer who enters a boxing contest at London's Albert Hall thanks to the backing of Chris Steele, a wealthy sportsman. However, Don's evil brother Jasper plants Steele's wallet on Don, leading to his arrest. In a desperate bid to make the match, Don escapes from a policeman, but Jasper kills the officer. During the fight, the news of the policeman's death reaches Don, causing him to lose the bout. Wrongfully convicted of manslaughter, he is sent to prison. His lover Belle remains loyal and she is reunited with Don on his release.

== Cast ==
- Tamara Desni as Belle Chikno
- Ralph Ince as Al Dempson
- Bruce Seton as Don Chikno
- Ian Colin as Chris Steele
- Eric Hales as Tawno Herne
- Hal Walters as Stiffy Williams
- Beryl de Querton as Anna Steele
- Wilson Coleman as Jasper Chikno
- Jock McKay as Mac
- Bill Shine as Ted
- Philip Ray as Jan
- Ben Williams as Jenkins
- Gordon Bailey as minor role
- Guy Belmore as minor role
- Cecil Bevan as minor role

== Reception ==
Kine Weekly wrote: "The story is apt to be ragged, but individual situations are effectively dealt with even if the gipsy characterisations do not ring very true. The boxing scene at the Albert Hall ... is exciting if not altogether realistic. Love interest is colourful, and dialogue enlivened by the cockneyisms of Don's trainer keep the entertainment going. One or two musical interludes help the atmosphere, but in no way overpower the action."

The Daily Film Renter wrote: "Bruce Seton makes a virile hero and knows how to use his fists. Tamara Desni is attractive as Belle, and Ralph Ince admirably fills the role of a boxing promoter. lan Colin and Beryl De Querton play Steele and his sister, while Jock McKay contributes an amusing performance."

Picturegoer wrote: "Lacking rather in conviction, there is a certain amount of picturesqueness about this story of a fair-ground boxing champion who finds romance but loses boxing honours. It is somewhat ragged in construction, but some situations are well put over, especially a boxing match at the Albert Hall; it may lack realism, but it is quite exciting. As Dan, the gipsy, Bruce Seton is sound, as is Tamara Desni as Belle, the girl he loves, who is also wooed by his opponent in the ring, one Tawno, who is interpreted vigorously enough by Eric Hales: Hal Walters scores several laughs as a Cockney trainer."

Picture Show wrote: "Ralph Ince gives a first-rate pertormance as the boxing promoter. Tamara Desni is attractive as the gipsy heroine. Bruce Seton has a pleasant singing voice."
