= Ralph W. Brinton =

British art director (1895–1975)

- Born: 1895; England
- Died: 1975 (aged 79–80)
- Occupation: Art director
- Years active: 1935–1963

Ralph W. Brinton (1895–1975) was a British art director. He was nominated for an Academy Award in the category Best Art Direction for the film Tom Jones.

== Selected filmography ==
- Blue Smoke (1935)
- Late Extra (1935)
- Sleeping Car to Trieste (1948)
- I'll Get You for This (1951)
- Tom Jones (1963)
