= Dark World (1935 film) =

1935 British film by Bernard Vorhaus

- Tamara Desni and Leon Quartermaine in a scene from the film
- Directed by: Bernard Vorhaus
- Written by: Hugh Brooke
- Story by: Leslie Landau; Selwyn Jepson
- Produced by: Leslie Landau
- Starring: Tamara Desni; Leon Quartermaine; Olga Lindo; Hugh Brooke
- Edited by: Cecil Williamson
- Music by: Charles Cowlrick
- Production company: Fox Film Corporation
- Distributed by: Fox Film Corporation
- Release date: December 1935
- Running time: 73 minutes
- Country: United Kingdom
- Language: English

Dark World is a 1935 lost British film directed by Bernard Vorhaus and starring Tamara Desni, Leon Quartermaine, Hugh Brooke and Googie Withers. it was written by Brooke from a story by Leslie Landau and Selwyn Jepson.

== Preservation status ==
The British Film Institute has classed Dark World as a lost film. Its National Archive holds a collection of ephemera and stills but no film or video materials.

== Plot summary ==
A story of two brothers. The elder, Stephen, is adopted, and jealous of his younger brother Philip, the family's favourite, blessed with charm and musical talent. They both fall in love with Brigitta, a dancer. When she chooses Philip, Stephen decides to murder him. However his plan backfires and the wrong man dies.

== Cast ==
- Tamara Desni as Brigitta
- Leon Quartermaine as Stephen
- Hugh Brooke as Philip
- Olga Lindo as Eleanor
- Morton Selten as Colonel
- Fred Duprez as Schwartz
- Viola Compton as Auntie
- Googie Withers as Annie
- Kynaston Reeves as John

== Reception ==
The Monthly Film Bulletin wrote: "A gripping psychological drama, cleverly directed, with consistently good acting and natural dialogue. ... What might have been too sombre a tragedy is relieved by many lighter touches and the fact that Brigitta is a dancer gives scope for some lovely ballet scenes. The acting is excellent and the contribution to the whole made by the acting of every one of the minor parts is notable. Leon Quartermaine and Tamara Desni well sustain the major roles of Stephen and Brigitta, and Morton Selter as an old Colonel, and all the other characters – Philip, Auntie, Annie and the rest – make the situations credible and sometimes moving. Olga Lindo has rather a thankless task as an unfaithful wife, in a secondary theme which is sketchily depicted. It is a film well above the average both in conception and execution."

Kine Weekly wrote: "Triangle drama, conventional in theme, but modern in interpretation and presentation. The treatment is a trifle high-falutin' at times, but the cast-iron fundamentals nevertheless gain adequate recognition and bring to the screen situations that are well charged with arresting suspense. The acting, entrusted to experienced stage and screen favourites, is up to standard, and the technicalqualities are first class. Good average general booking, with an appeal clearly addressed to the feminine element."

The Daily Film Renter wrote: "Drama of jealousy and ingeniously contrived murder in which few dexterous twists give variation to familiar triangle theme. Story is driven along at good speed, culminating in suspenseful backstage climax. Competent acting, attractive dancing and pleasant touches of comedy other features. Useful booking for popular halls."

Picturegoer wrote: "A old-time melodrama in an up-to-date dress, in which Tamara Desni gives a good performance and dances delightfully. ...There is some suspense and the staging generally is good. As Philip, Hugh Brooke is effective enough in a natural, unassuming manner, but Leon Quartermaine is apt to make the villain too obviously double-dyed."

== See also ==
- List of lost films
