= His Majesty and Company =

1935 film

- Barbara Waring, John Garrick, Mary Grey and Morton Selten in the film.
- Directed by: Anthony Kimmins
- Written by: Sally Sutherland
- Starring: John Garrick; Barbara Waring; Morton Selten
- Cinematography: Alex Bryce
- Music by: Will Grosz; Ord Hamilton
- Production company: Fox Film Company
- Distributed by: Fox Film Company
- Release date: 1935
- Running time: 56 minutes
- Country: United Kingdom
- Language: English

His Majesty and Company (also known as His Majesty and Co. and His Majesty & Co.) is a 1935 British musical film directed by Anthony Kimmins and starring John Garrick, Barbara Waring, and Morton Selten. It was written by Sally Sutherland, and made at Wembley Studios by the British subsidiary of the Fox Film Company as a quota quickie.

== Plot ==
John visits Poldavia and meets and falls in love with Princess Sandra. But she is engaged to Prince Michael, leaving John to return home to London heartbroken. He later meets Sandra again, who is now an exile in London. Together they open the Café Poldavia.

== Cast ==
- John Garrick as John
- Barbara Waring as Princess Sandra
- Morton Selten as King of Poldavia
- Wally Patch as Bert Hicks
- Mary Grey as Queen
- Jean Gillie as Nina
- Desmond Jeans as Michael
- Harold Saxon-Snell as Ferguson
- Howard Douglas as Sam Bloom
- Hilda Campbell-Russell as Minnie Watson
- Alfredo Campoli as Leader, Tzigane srchestra
- Eddie Fitmaurice
- Betty le Brocke as specialty act
- Campbell Russell

== Reception ==
The Monthly Film Bulletin wrote: "A charming musical trifle, showing a delightful and typically English sense of humour. The casting, particularly that of the royal couple, is excellent. Acting, settings, photography and music all maintain a good standard. There are a few weak points, e.g., the closeup of the first song-duet, but in general one is kept in the right mood all the time. The director is to be congratulated."

Kine Weekly wrote: "Slight romantic comedy with one or two tuneful song numbers and ingenuous humour. It is quite well produced in an unpretentious manner and affords a fair light second feature for popular programmes. ... John Garrick is very good as John, but Barbara Waring is weak as Sandra. ... The flimsy plot is quite skilfully directed and is rendered fairly amusing in its byplay and detail. The song numbers are well introduced and the production generally has a certain amount of technical polish."

Picture Show wrote: "A comedy drama in Ruritania, in which the hero runs a restaurant staffed with deposed royalty. John Garrick as John gives a smooth performance, in which he is ably supported by Barbara Waring as Princess Sandra. Morton Selten as the royal tippler Is amusing, Mary Grey as his wife is good, and Wally Patch is responsible for some good comedy. Entertaining."
