= Barbara Couper =

British actress (1903–1992)

- Born: 6 January 1903; London; United Kingdom
- Died: 10 January 1992 (aged 89); Woking; United Kingdom
- Occupation: Actress
- Years active: 1925–1969
- Spouse: Howard Rose

Barbara Couper (6 January 1903 – 10 January 1992) was a British stage, film and television actress. She made her stage debut in 1925 and played leading roles at Stratford in the 1930s. Her screen work included several films and much television.

== Selected filmography ==
- Heaven Is Round the Corner (1944) – Mrs. Trevor
- The Story of Shirley Yorke (1948) – Muriel Peach
- The Last Days of Dolwyn (1949) – Lady Dolwyn
- Dark Secret (1949) – Mrs. Barrington
- Paul Temple's Triumph (1950) – Mrs. Morgan
- Happy Go Lovely (1951) – Madame Amanda
- The Lady with a Lamp (1951) – Mrs. Nightingale
- The Weak and the Wicked (1954) – Prison Doctor
- Face in the Night (1957) – Mrs. Francis
- The World of Tim Frazer (1960, TV series) – Ruth Edwards
- The Amorous Adventures of Moll Flanders (1965) – The Mayor's wife
- The Great St. Trinian's Train Robbery (1966) – Mabel Radnage
- Goodbye, Mr. Chips (1969) – Mrs. Paunceforth
