= Fabian of Scotland Yard =

- Genre: Police procedural
- Created by: Antony Beauchamp
- Developed by: Antony Beauchamp Productions
- Written by: Robert Fabian; Brock Williams; Ian Stuart Black
- Directed by: Charles Saunders; Alex Bryce; Montgomery Tully; Bernard Knowles
- Starring: Bruce Seton; Robert Raglan
- Country of origin: United Kingdom
- Original language: English
- No. of series: 1
- No. of episodes: 39

Production
- Producer: John Larkin
- Cinematography: Brendan J. Stafford
- Running time: 30 minutes
- Production companies: Antony Beauchamp Productions, Trinity Productions Ltd., Telefilm Enterprises

Original release
- Network: BBC Television
- Release: 13 November 1954 – 6 February 1956

Fabian of Scotland Yard is a British police procedural television series based on the real-life memoirs of Scotland Yard detective Robert Fabian, produced by Trinity Productions, with episodes purchased by the BBC and broadcast between November 1954 and February 1956. It is considered the earliest police procedural to be shown on British TV, sharing many points of commonality with the U.S. series Dragnet which had gone on air in 1951.

Originally made by Antony Beauchamp at Carlton Hill Studios for sale to American television in 1953, six episodes were sold to Eros Films for UK theatrical release and at least 30 episodes were shown on the BBC, of 30 minutes each. Six episodes were not shown by the BBC as they had been sold to Eros Films for theatrical release. The series was broadcast in the U.S. under the titles Fabian of Scotland Yard or Patrol Car.

== Synopsis ==
Apart from Bruce Seton, who played the eponymous Fabian in every episode, the series had relatively few recurring characters in comparison with later British police series. Only Robert Raglan as Detective Sergeant Wyatt was in any way a regular, appearing in 15 episodes. No other cast member featured in more than six episodes, as the particular skills of their character were called on to assist in a case germane to their speciality, such as the laboratory expert, the psychiatrist, the pathologist or the graphologist. There were guest appearances from well-known actors such as Kathleen Byron, Elspet Gray, Kieron Moore and Michael Craig, but for the most part the cast consisted of relative unknowns.

Fabian of the Yard was one of the earliest BBC-shown British drama series to be shot entirely on film rather than broadcast live, with each episode featuring voiceover narration from Seton. Each case was a dramatisation of a genuine crime which had taken place in the London area between the 1920s and the early 1950s, usually, although not invariably, a murder. Many of the cases featured had made national headlines in their day, such as "Little Girl", based on the murder of an East London schoolgirl which had shocked the country in 1939. Each episode finished with an epilogue in which a shot of Seton at his desk dissolved into a shot of the real-life Fabian at the same desk, who then explained to viewers what had happened to the real criminal from the case they had just been watching.

== Episodes Broadcast on BBC Television ==
1. "The Extra Bullet" (13 November 1954)
2. "The Unwanted Man" (20 November 1954)
3. "The Skeleton in the Closet" (27 November 1954)
4. "Against the Evidence" (8 January 1955)
5. "Bride of the Fires" (22 January 1955)
6. "The Troubled Wife" (29 January 1955)
7. "Written in the Dust" (19 February 1955)
8. "The Purple Mouse" (26 February 1955)
9. "Little Girl" (12 March 1955)
10. "The Coward" (19 March 1955)
11. "The Lost Boy" (30 March 1955)
12. "The Executioner" (6 April 1955)
13. "The Poison Machine" (13 April 1955)
14. "The Golden Peacock" (20 April 1955)
15. "The Man from Blackpool" (4 May 1955)
16. "Robbery in the Museum" (11 May 1955)
17. "The Deadly Pocket Handkerchief" (18 May 1955)
18. "The Hand of Terror" (25 May 1955)
19. "Pin-Point Signature" (1 June 1955)
20. "The Innocent Victims" (8 June 1955)
21. "The Jade Blade" (15 June 1955)
22. "April Fool" (22 June 1955)
23. "No Alibi" (12 November 1955)
24. "The Vanishing Cat" (14 November 1955)
25. "Escort to Death" (19 November 1955)
26. "The Sixth Dagger" (26 November 1955)
27. "The Ribbon Trap" (17 January 1956)
28. "Cocktail Girl" (30 January 1956)
29. "The Masterpiece" (6 February 1956)
30. "The Lover's Knot" (26 September 1956) BBC Scotland

== Theatrical Release ==
Released by Eros as a portmanteau feature "Fabian of the Yard":

1. "Death on the Portsmouth Road"
2. "The Actress and the Kidnap Plot"
3. "Bombs in Piccadilly".

Released by Eros as a portmanteau feature "Handcuffs, London":

1. "Handcuffs: London"
2. "The King's Hat"
3. "Nell Gwynn's Tear".

== No record of a UK release ==
These two episodes were broadcast in the US and Australia, but have never been listed as broadcast by the BBC or released theatrically:

1. “The Witches of Wednesday”
2. “Moral Murder".

Another episode, "Murder in Soho", was not purchased by the BBC and refused a certificate by the BBFC for theatrical release because the story was based on the relatively recent Alec de Antiquis murder.
