= Morton Selten =

British actor (1860–1939)

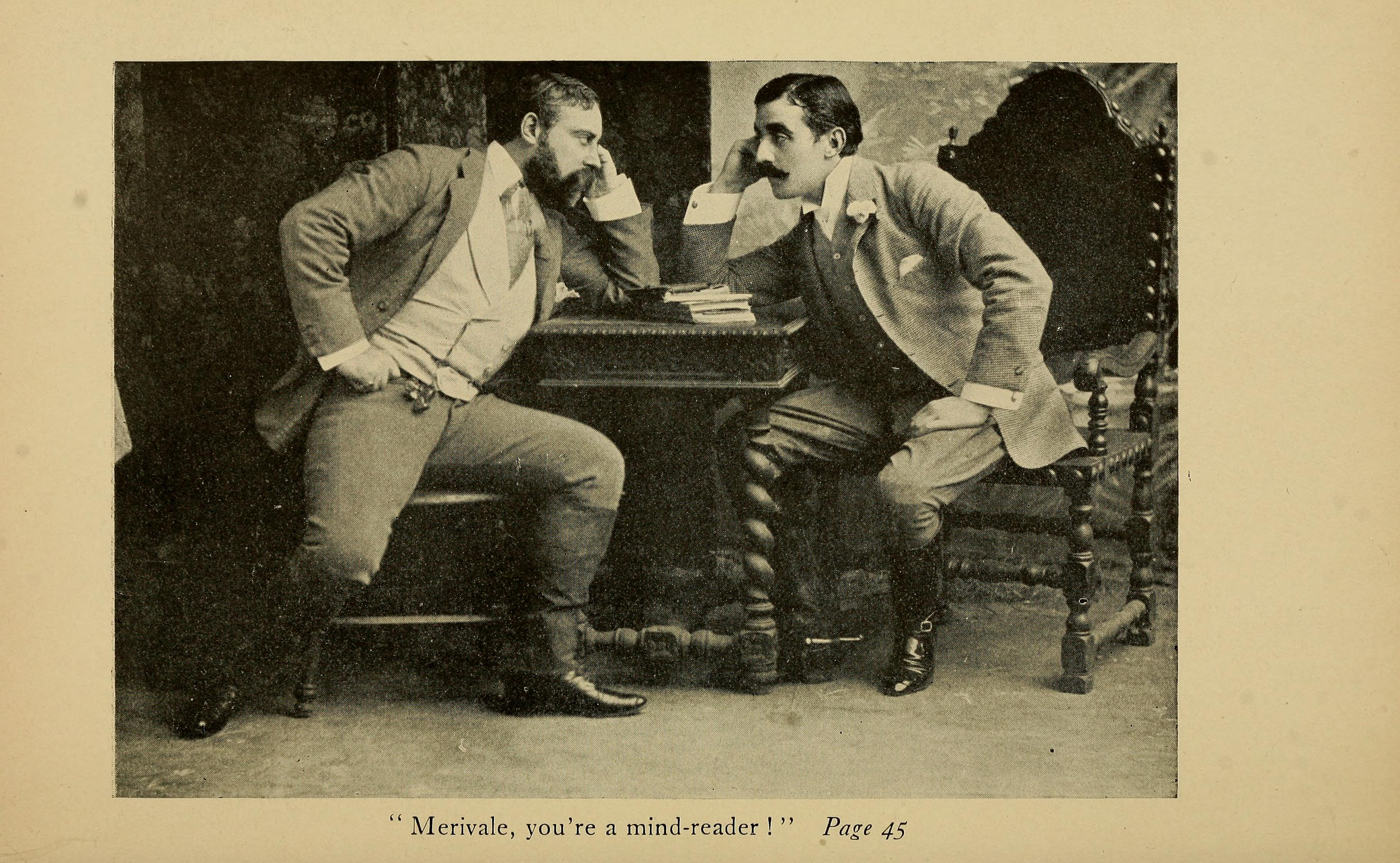
- Morton Selten (left) and E. H. Sothern in the Broadway comedy Captain Lettarblair (1891)
- Born: Morton Richard Stubbs; 6 January 1860; Marlborough, England, UK
- Died: 27 July 1939 (aged 79); London, England, UK
- Other names: Morton Selton
- Occupations: film and stage actor
- Years active: 1878–1939
- Notable work: Our Flat (1889), Shenandoah (1889), Captain Lettarblair (1891), Branded (1920), The Thief of Bagdad (1940)

Morton Selten (6 January 1860 – 27 July 1939) was a British stage and film actor. He was occasionally credited as Morton Selton.

== Biography ==
Selten was born 6 January 1860. At birth, Selten was given the name Morton Richard Stubbs and was the son of Morton Stubbs, a lawyer who died in 1877. It is said that Selten was widely believed to be an illegitimate son of the then Prince of Wales (and future King Edward VII). However, the prince's first sexual experience was as a 19-year-old in September 1861 with an Irish actress named Nellie Clifden, as he noted in his diary.

Selten began acting on the stage in 1878, mainly in America. In 1889, he played Clarence Vane in Mrs. Hargrove's Our Flat at the Lyceum Theatre and Captain Heartsease in Shenandoah, Bronson Howard's American Civil War epic. Selten would go on to play in some twenty-five Broadway productions over the following three decades. His film career began with his portrayal of the Marquis of Shelford in Branded (1920). His last film role was as the King of the Land of Legend in The Thief of Bagdad (1940).

Selten suffered from ill health in his final year of life. He underwent two operations in the first few months of 1939, which left him weak and unable to walk. Selten died of a heart attack on 27 July 1939 during the production of The Thief of Bagdad.

== Stage work ==
- Our Flat (1889) - Clarence Vane
- Shenandoah (1889-1890) - Captain Heartsease
- Captain Lettarblair (1891) - Francis Merivale
- Sheridan (1893) - Capt. Lord Lochinvar
- The Victoria Cross (1894)
- An Enemy to the King (1896) - De Berquin
- Change Alley (1897) - Jack Spurway
- The King's Musketeer (1899) - Louis XIII
- The King's Musketeer (1899) (second run) - Louis XIII
- The Song of the Sword (1899)
- Her Majesty, the Girl Queen of Nordenmark (1900)
- Unleavened Bread (1901)
- Her Lord and Master (1902)
- Hearts Aflame (1902)
- Heidelberg (1902-1903)
- The Taming of Helen (1903)
- Man Proposes (1904)
- Camille (1904)
- Yvette (1904)
- My Wife (1907)
- The World and His Wife (1908-1909) - Captain Beaulieu
- The Barber of New Orleans (1909)
- Herod (1909) - Pheroras
- Smith (1910) - Herbert Dallas-Baker, K.C.
- The Runaway (1911)
- The "Mind-the-Paint" Girl (1912-1913) - Lionel Roper
- The Amazons (1913) - Rev. Roger Minchin
- The Legend of Leonora (1914) - Sir Roderick Peripety
- The Little Minister (1916)
- A Kiss for Cinderella (1916-1917) - Mr. Bodie
- Humpty Dumpty (1918)

== Filmography ==
- Branded (1920) - Marquis of Shelford
- Somebody's Darling (1925)
- The Shadow Between (1931) - Sir George Fielder
- Service for Ladies (1932) - Mr. Robertson
- Wedding Rehearsal (1932) - Major Harry Roxbury
- Falling for You (1933) - Caldicott
- The Love Wager (1933) - General Neville
- The Diplomatic Lover (1934) - Sir Charles
- Once in a New Moon (1935) - Lord Bravington
- Ten Minute Alibi (1935) - Sir Miles Standish
- Annie, Leave the Room! (1935) - Lord Spendlove
- Moscow Nights (1935) - Gen. Kovrin
- The Ghost Goes West (1935) - The Glourie
- His Majesty and Company (1935) - King of Poldavia
- Dark World (1935) - Colonel
- Two's Company (1936) - Earl of Warke
- In the Soup (1936) - Abernethy Ruppershaw
- Juggernaut (1936) - Sir Charles Clifford
- Fire Over England (1937) - Burleigh
- Action for Slander (1937) - Judge Trotter
- The Divorce of Lady X (1938) - Lord Steele
- A Yank at Oxford (1938) - Cecil Davidson, Esq.
- Shipyard Sally (1939) - Lord Alfred Randall
- Young Man's Fancy (1939) - Mr. Fothergill
- The Thief of Bagdad (1940) - The Old King (final film role)

== See also ==
- List of British actors
