= Bruce Gordon Seton =

Scottish military surgeon and historian

Arms of Seton of Abercorn

Colonel Sir Bruce Gordon Seton, 9th Baronet, CB, FRSE (13 October 1868 – 7 July 1932) was a Scottish military surgeon and historian.

== Life ==
He was born on 13 October 1868 the son of Emma Elizabeth Loch, and her husband, Col Alexander Reginald Seton, of the Royal Engineers.

He is thought to have trained in medicine at the University of Edinburgh and Barts, and was awarded MRCS and LRCP London in 1891. He then underwent military training at Sandhurst, as was the family tradition.

He joined the Indian Medical Service as a surgeon lieutenant in January 1892 and was promoted to surgeon captain in January 1895, to major in January 1904 and to lieutenant-colonel in January 1912. He served on the North-West Frontier at the Khyber Pass in 1894, being severely wounded at Kaniguram in this campaign. He served further in the Tochi Valley Campaign of 1897. By 1899 he had reached the rank of captain. He was granted the brevet rank of colonel on 30 June 1913 and was colonel by 1914.

In the First World War he was officer commanding at the Kitchener Hospital in Brighton, focussing on the medical treatment of Indian troops injured in France and Flanders. In 1917 he became deputy director general of the Indian Medical Service and was awarded CB in the 1917 Birthday Honours.

In 1915, following the death of his uncle, Robert Maxwell Seton, he became 9th Baronet of Abercorn.

In 1926, he was elected a Fellow of the Royal Society of Edinburgh. His proposers were Sir James Alfred Ewing, John Gray McKendrick, Walter Biggar Blaikie and James Lorrain Smith.

He died in Edinburgh on 3 July 1932. His medals were sold at auction in 2012.

== Publications ==
- Cavalry Elementary Veterinary Manual (1895)
- The Indian Medical service (1911)
- The Pipes of War (1920)
- The Prisoners of the Forty-Five (1928)

== Family ==
In 1895 he married Elma Armstrong (d.1960), daughter of Lt Col Frank Hugh Armstrong. They had two daughters and two sons, who held the baronetcy consecutively, the second being the actor Bruce Seton.

Baronetage of Nova Scotia
Preceded by Bruce Maxwell Seton	Baronet (of Abercorn); 1915–1932	Succeeded by Alexander Hay Seton
