= James Harvey Bloom =

British antiquarian (1860–1943)

- Born: 28 December 1860
- Died: 23 May 1943 (aged 82)
- Education: Fitzwilliam College, Cambridge
- Occupations: Clergyman and antiquary
- Children: Ursula Bloom

James Harvey Bloom (28 December 1860 – 23 May 1943) was an English clergyman and antiquary.

Bloom was the son of Rev. James Graver Bloom.

The 1881 Census lists him as tutor at Westbury House Preparatory School, 12 Liverpool Terrace, Worthing, Sussex. The principal was Miss Elaine Billing, but by 1883 Bloom had assumed this position. He had a significant influence on one pupil at the school, the eleven-year-old Arthur Tansley, future founder of the British Ecological Society.

Bloom subsequently became a non-collegiate student at the University of Cambridge, gaining his B.A. degree in 1887 and a M.A. in 1891. He was ordained deacon in Calcutta in 1888, and appointed curate of St Andrew's Church, Hertford. After becoming a priest in 1890, he served as curate of Hemsworth from 1890 to 1892. He was Headmaster of Long Marston Grammar School from 1893 to 1895, and then Rector of Whitchurch, Warwickshire, from 1896 to 1917.

He became a genealogist, antiquarian and miscellaneous author.

Bloom died on 23 May 1943. His books were sold at auction.

His daughter was the novelist Ursula Bloom, who in 1963 published a memoir of her father, Parson Extraordinary.

== Works ==
- Shakespeare's Church, otherwise the Collegiate Church of the Holy Trinity of Stratford-upon-Avon: an architectural and ecclesiastical history of the fabric and its ornaments, 1902
- Shakespeare's Garden: being a compendium of quotations and references from the bard to all manner of flower, tree, bush, vine, and herb, arranged according to the month in which they are seen to flourish, 1903
- English Seals, 1906
- English Tracts, Pamphlets and Printed Sheets: a bibliography, 1923
- Folk Lore, Old Customs, and Superstitions in Shakespeare Land, 1929
- Medical Practitioners in the Diocese of London, Licensed under the Act of 3 Henry VIII, c. 11: an annotated list, 1529–1725, 1935
