= Seton baronets =

Set index for Seton baronets

There have been four baronetcies created for persons with the surname Seton, all in the Baronetage of Nova Scotia. As of 2026 one creation is extant, one dormant and two extinct.

- Seton baronets of Abercorn (1663)
- Seton baronets of Garleton (1664)
- Seton baronets of Windygowl (1671): see Sir Robert Seton, 1st Baronet (1641–1671)
- Seton baronets of Pitmedden (1683)
