= London Town (1946 film) =

- Sid Field and Petula Clark
- Directed by: Wesley Ruggles
- Written by: Val Guest; Sig Herzig; Elliot Paul
- Produced by: Wesley Ruggles
- Starring: Sid Field; Petula Clark; Greta Gynt; Kay Kendall; Sonnie Hale; Tessie O'Shea
- Cinematography: Erwin Hillier
- Edited by: Sidney Stone
- Music by: Jimmy Van Heusen (lyrics by Johnny Burke)
- Distributed by: Eagle-Lion Distributors Limited
- Release date: 30 September 1946 (UK release)
- Running time: 126 minutes
- Country: United Kingdom
- Language: English
- Budget: £1 million or $2 million

London Town (also known as My Heart Goes Crazy) is a 1946 Technicolor musical film directed by Wesley Ruggles and starring Sid Field and Petula Clark. The screenplay was by Sig Herzig, Val Guest, and Elliot Paul, based on a story by Ruggles.

== Plot summary ==
Comedian Jerry Sanford arrives in London believing he has been hired as the star of a major stage production, when in fact he is merely an understudy. Thanks to his daughter Peggy, who sabotages the revue's star Charlie de Haven, he finally gets his big break. The premise allows for a variety of musical numbers and comedy sketches.

== Cast ==
- Sid Field as Jerry Sanford
- Greta Gynt as Mrs. Eve Barry
- Petula Clark as Peggy Sanford
- Kay Kendall as Patsy
- Sonnie Hale as Charlie de Haven
- Claude Hulbert as Belgrave, Charlie's dresser
- Mary Clare as Mrs. Gates
- Tessie O'Shea as herself
- Jerry Desmonde as George
- Beryl Davis as Paula
- Scotty McHarg as Bill
- W. G. Fay as Mike
- Reginald Purdell as stage manager
- Alfie Dean as heckler
- Charles Paton as novelty shopkeeper
- Pamela Carroll as street singer
- Marion Saunders as obligato In 'Street Singer'
- Lucas Hoving as dancer
- Jack Parnell as drummer

== Production ==
Financed by the Rank Organisation at a time of rationing and shortages of materials in the period immediately after World War II, it was filmed in the shell of "Sound City Shepperton", which had been made available as a film studio after being requisitioned during the war as a factory for aircraft parts.

Music Hall performer Field had cheered up wartime London audiences with his hugely successful stage variety shows, including Strike a New Note (1943), Strike it Again (1944), and Piccadilly Hayride (1946), so he seemed a natural for the lead. As he was of the opinion that no British director was capable of making a good musical, he insisted on having an American at the helm, and the task fell to Wesley Ruggles, who produced as well.

Val Guest said he did not write the script, but he "did a script of all Sid's stuff" because they had worked together on stage. He continued, "Wes Ruggles needed somebody firm on top of him and he didn’t have anybody. I think they were overawed by his “weight” [gravitas] because his biography read like movie history. It just didn’t hang together, it was a very bad script". He added, "I spent quite a lot of time down there trying to hot things up, it was heart-breaking. Sid was also doing a show at the same time, and was having slight drinking problems—not a lot... Wes was sober during shooting yes, absolutely paralytic at night."

Kay Kendall was promoted as England's answer to Lana Turner. "Nobody had ever heard of me but they called me a star", she later recalled. "I opened bazaars, signed autographs, went to premieres, [and] did everything a star was supposed to do. My photograph was on magazine covers and front pages of newspapers. And all before we'd ever finished the picture."

== Reception ==
According to trade papers, the film was a "notable box office attraction" at British cinemas in 1946. It was a runner-up for best box office success in 1946 Britain. Kay Kendall said after the film's release there were "no more bazaars to open, no more premieres, [and] no more autographs."

According to Val Guest, "after it folded in America, they took all Sid's routines out of the picture and joined them all together and issued it. As a sort of comedy half-hour. And that became the rage in Hollywood, everybody had it at their parties because they thought he was quite fabulous. And Sinatra had special showings, it went around all the people there, it became a cult thing." Ruggles and Guest were going to make a film together about the Rolls-Royce family, but those plans ended after the financial failure of London Town.

The Monthly Film Bulletin wrote: "Around the laborious narration of this story is built the most costly British musical to date. Presumably if it had cost less it could have been cut by a further half-hour. An editor with authority and intelligence could still turn it into a musical of the average Hollywood standard. Ruthlessly impartial editing—to eliminate much of the ballet and to trim Field's individual sketches—is its chief lack. A few touches of neat camera-handling plus some lavish production work and extravagant costuming do not conceal the lack. Field is a comedian high in the tradition of the English music-hall, but more intelligent scripting would eliminate much which is repetitive in his set-piece sketches."

Kine Weekly wrote: "A sincere and ambitious attempt to match the best American Technicolor musical, and we wish it well. But wishing, contrary to the popular song, does not necessarily make it so. Faults there are in the film's construction, and you can't keep the truth from the box-office for long. ... Sid Field is terrific, and the proof of his genius is that he can still extract laughs from his familiar 'Slasher Green','Photographer' and 'Golfing' skits. There is never a dull moment while he's around. ... As for the plot, it soon gets lost. But, in spite of the film's lack of verve, novelty and balance, Sid Field still remains a comedy personality to be reckoned with."

The Daily Film Renter wrote: "London Town strikes a new note in British film production. Here is a musical comedy with speed, assurance, spectacle and all the polish of the American product, presented in gentle English colourings, demonstrating typical English scenes and characters. One swallow doesn't make a summer, but one Sid Field certainly makes a musicolor. What a performance!"

Variety wrote: "Treatment of the film is thoroughly American, forcing the question why it should have been made in Britain at all. In every respect it apes the American model, and London, as the London Times points out, becomes a suburb of Hollywood. Most surprising of all is the quality of the musical items, which fail every time to stun the ear with haunting hits and lack good voices throughout."

Picturegoer wrote: "It runs too long, and the oases in a somewhat arid desert are mostly supplied by Sid Field, who proves that he has the potentialities of a first-rate screen comedian; he can, with good material, emulate his stage successes."

== Music ==
Songs in London Town include "You Can't Keep a Good Dreamer Down", "The 'Ampstead Way", "Any Way the Wind Blows", a medley of Cockney songs ("Knock 'em in the Old Kent Road"/"Any Old Iron"/"Follow the Van"), "Don't Dilly Dally on the Way" (sung by Charles Collins), and "My Heart Goes Crazy", which was the title under which an abridged U.S. version of the film was released by United Artists in 1953.

In September 2006, the film's soundtrack—plus bonus tracks including four early studio recordings by Clark—was released on CD by Sepia Records.

== Media ==
The original two-hour-12-minute version, which was never released commercially, is now available for viewing at the archives at the BFI Southbank.

In September 2011, the full-length version of the film was made commercially available for the first time, when it was released on a PAL DVD by Odeon Entertainment in the U.K.
