= Sid Field =

English comedian (1904–1950)

- Field in 1949
- Born: Sidney Arthur Field; 1 April 1904; Birmingham, England
- Died: 3 February 1950 (aged 45); Wimbledon, London, England
- Occupation: Comedian
- Years active: 1916–1950

Sidney Arthur Field (1 April 1904 – 3 February 1950) was an English comedy entertainer who was popular in the 1940s.

== Early years ==
Field was born in Ladywood, Birmingham, Warwickshire, the son of Albert, a candlemaker, and Bertha, a dressmaker. Field spent most of his childhood in Birmingham. As a child, he charged his friends "admission" to his back garden impression shows. He also busked and performed in the queues at his local cinema dressed as Charlie Chaplin, once being cautioned by police for his activities. Field was later praised by Chaplin himself, at whose parties Field was a regular invitee.

Field was educated at Conway Road, Stratford Road and Golden Hillock Road schools, and attended Sunday school at Emmanuel Church, Walford Road. His cousins, "the Workmans", performed in concerts at Moseley Road Swimming Baths in the city, where Field made his stage debut, singing "What A Life" at the age of nine.

His first professional engagement, with "The Kino Royal Juveniles", came in July 1916, after his mother responded to an advertisement in the Birmingham Mail. He later worked as an understudy to Wee Georgie Wood in a Birmingham pantomime, then appeared in review at the Bordesley Palace and the Mission Hall in Church Road, Yardley. To assuage the young Sid's stage fright, Bertha gave him a glass of port to drink: by the age of 13, he was dependent on alcohol.

== Success ==
Field was considered unusual among comedy performers of the day, as his act was a multitude of characters and impersonations, at a time when most variety (vaudeville) acts were more limited in nature. Despite his flair for comedy and acting, it was not until he had spent decades touring provincial music halls that Field finally achieved prominence, appearing in London's West End as Slasher Green, the Cockney "wide boy" or "spiv". His rise to stardom was quick.

In Strike a New Note (1943), Strike it Again (1944) and Piccadilly Hayride (1946), he had his audiences roaring with laughter. One reviewer commented that he was the only comedian who had the audience literally "falling off their seats with laughter". He was loved for his routines involving a naïve approach to the billiards table and the golf course, played with his straight man, Jerry Desmonde. Terry-Thomas acted as compere for the shows and appeared with Field in one of the sketches.

On 5 November 1945, Field appeared in the Royal Variety Performance. Appearing again in 1946, he became one of the few artists to make an appearance in two consecutive Royal Performances. 18 months later in 1948, Field was topping the bill at the London Palladium, replacing Mickey Rooney.

Field had a starring role in That's the Ticket (1940) but London Town (1946) is often referred to as his first film in error. Some of his best-remembered sketches are preserved here. Field made one more film, Cardboard Cavalier (as Sidcup Buttermeadow), co-starring with Margaret Lockwood. However, cinema was not Field's most effective medium, and his films were neither critical nor commercial successes.

It is perhaps because of this lack of recorded material on film or TV, that Field is now largely forgotten. Only the three films and some recorded variety material survive. He influenced a generation of comedians and pioneered the use of character acting in comedy. He was cited as a comic favourite by Eric Morecambe, Eric Sykes, Frankie Howerd, Tommy Cooper, among many others, and an influence to Tony Hancock. He was described by Bob Hope as being 'probably the best comedian of them all.' Laurence Olivier, during an interview with Kenneth Tynan in 1966, cited Field as a strong influence on his acting, saying, 'Of all people I have ever watched with the greatest delight, I think, was in another field entirely, was Sid Field … I still borrow from him, freely and unashamedly.'

His only straight role came in 1949 in Mary Chase's play Harvey, as Elwood P. Dowd, the role played in the 1950 film by James Stewart. Members of the royal family went to see the play in August.

== Personal life and death ==
Field married Constance 'Connie' Dawkins (1910–1992), stage actress, in 1933, Birmingham. They had two daughters and a son. In December 1949 he returned from a cruise on the Durban Castle taken for health reasons.

On 3 February 1950, during the run of Harvey, Field died from a heart attack at his home, Arran Cottage, Parkside, Wimbledon, London. He was 45.

Over 300 people attended his funeral at Putney Vale Crematorium. Later that month, a memorial service was held at London's St Martin-in-the-Fields, with lessons read by Laurence Olivier and Ted Ray. A midnight matinée benefit for his wife and children, held on 25 June 1951, was attended by the Duchess of Kent, Aneurin Bevan and Noël Coward. The cast list included Jack Hylton, Bud Flanagan, Arthur Askey, Tommy Trinder, all six of the original Crazy Gang, Peter Ustinov, George Robey and many more, totalling over 240.

== Legacy ==
There is a Birmingham Civic Society blue plaque commemorating Field on the front of 152 Osborn Road, where he grew up, and a memorial in the foyer of the Prince of Wales Theatre in London, which says:

To the memory of the great comedian Sid Field, who made his first appearance in the West End at this theatre on 18 March 1943 and who played his last performance here on 2 February 1950.

In 1994, actor David Suchet portrayed Field in a stage play of his life, What a Performance. In October 2011, Suchet followed this up as the presenter of a BBC Four documentary about Field. In the programme, Suchet meets stars such as Eric Sykes, Leslie Phillips and Nicholas Parsons who recall Field's stage shows.

Field's son is John Nicholas Sidney Field; his grandson is controversial skateboarder and culture Youtuber Gifted Hater.

== Prince of Wales Theatre shows ==
- 1943 – Strike a New Note
- 1944 – Strike it Again
- 1946 – Piccadilly Hayride
- 1949 – Harvey

== Film appearances ==
- 1940 – That's the Ticket
- 1946 – London Town
- 1949 – Cardboard Cavalier
