= Robert Fabian =

English police officer

- Born: Robert Honey Fabian; 31 January 1901; Lewisham, England
- Died: 14 June 1978 (aged 77); Epsom, Surrey, England
- Occupations: Police officer; Author
- Employer: Metropolitan Police

Robert Honey Fabian (31 January 1901 – 14 June 1978) was an English police officer, who rose to the rank of Detective Superintendent in the Metropolitan Police.

== Biography ==
Fabian was born in Lewisham in 1901. He joined the police in 1921. One biographical account of Fabian credits him with the capture of Robert Augustus Delaney, the first known cat burglar. He was described as "small but wiry, carefully dressed and with sharp features and piercing eyes... He was always good‐natured and polite."

After retirement from the force in 1949, he worked as crime writer. His work was dramatised in the BBC drama series, 1954–56, Fabian of the Yard, based on his book of the same name (in reference to New Scotland Yard). Each episode ended with an epilogue in which Fabian described the real-life case on which the preceding story had been based. He also served as "custodian of the questions" on ITV's The $64,000 Question. It is written that Fabian took up gardening after his retirement from the Metropolitan Police.

He subsequently wrote a somewhat salacious but revelatory account of Soho's vice trade in London After Dark.

On 12 March 1957, he appeared on the game show To Tell the Truth – he was correctly identified by the entire panel, with the exception of Carl Reiner. Fabian also appeared as a castaway on the BBC Radio programme Desert Island Discs on 20 February 1956.

He died in an Epsom, Surrey hospital on 14 June 1978 at the age of 77.

== Bibliography ==
- Fabian of the Yard. Naldrett Press. 1950.
- London After Dark. Naldrett Press. 1954.

== See also ==
- Charles Walton (murder victim)
- A famous case he failed to solve
