= Seton baronets of Garleton (1664) =

Escutcheon of the Seton baronets of Garleton (Garleton), and of Windygowl (Windygoul)

The Seton baronetcy, of Garleton in the County of Haddington, was created in the Baronetage of Nova Scotia on 9 December 1664 for John Seton. On the death of the 2nd Baronet, c. 1720, his heir George, a Jacobite taken prisoner in 1715 at the Battle of Preston, was under attainder, and the title was consequently forfeited.

== Seton baronets, of Garleton (1664) ==
- Sir John Seton, 1st Baronet (1639–1686)
- Sir George Seton, 2nd Baronet (died c. 1720)
