= Ursula Bloom =

British novelist

- Born: Ursula Harvey Bloom; 11 December 1892; Springfield, Essex, England
- Died: 29 October 1984 (aged 91); Nether Wallop, Hampshire, England
- Occupations: Novelist; biographer; journalist
- Writing career
- Pen name: Sheila Burns; Mary Essex; Rachel Harvey; Deborah Mann; Lozania Prole; Sara Sloane
- Genre: Romantic fiction

Ursula Bloom (11 December 1892 – 29 October 1984) was a British novelist, biographer and journalist. A prolific author, she wrote over 500 books, an achievement that earned her recognition in the 1975 edition of Guinness World Records.

== Biography ==
Ursula Harvey Bloom was born on 11 December 1892 in Springfield, Chelmsford, Essex, the daughter of the Reverend James Harvey Bloom, about whom she wrote a biography, Parson Extraordinary. She also wrote about her gypsy ("Diddicoy") great-grandmother, Frances Graver (born 1809), who was known as the "Rose of Norfolk", a sobriquet used by Bloom as the title of her biography. Bloom lived for a number of years in Stratford-upon-Avon, which was the subject of another book, Rosemary for Stratford-upon-Avon.

She wrote her first book at the age of seven. Charles Dickens was always a dominant influence; she had read every book of his before she was ten years of age, and then re-read them in her teens. Many of her novels were written under various pen names, including Sheila Burns, Mary Essex, Rachel Harvey, Deborah Mann, Lozania Prole and Sara Sloane. She appeared frequently on British television. Her journalistic experiences were written about in her book The Mightier Sword. Her hobbies included needlework, which she exhibited, and cooking. She was a Fellow of the Royal Historical Society.

Ursula Bloom married twice: firstly, in 1916, to Captain Arthur Brownlow Denham-Cookes of the 24th (Queen's) London Regiment, late of the Inner Temple (son of Colonel George Denham-Cookes of the 3rd King's Own Light Dragoons and Hon. Clara, daughter of Charles Brownlow, 2nd Baron Lurgan), in the face of his family's "sniffy disapproval"; his aristocratic mother was by this time a wealthy widow, of Prince's Gate, Knightsbridge. Their son, George Philip ("Pip") Jocelyn, was born in 1917 (he married in 1944, Lorna Jean Iris, daughter of Charles Lawson, of Romford, and had issue). Arthur died of influenza in 1918, in the final days of the war. In 1925 she married Charles Gower Robinson (d. 1979), a Royal Navy Paymaster Commander; they lived at 191, Cranmer Court, London SW3. She died on 29 October 1984, aged 91, in a nursing home in Nether Wallop, Hampshire.

== List of works ==
(incomplete list:)

- The Driving of Destiny (1925)
- The Judge of Jerusalem (1926)
- Candleshades: The Story of a Soul (1928)
- Base Metal: The Story of a Man (1928)
- The Eternal Tomorrow (1929)
- To-morrow for Apricots (1930)
- This is Marriage (c. 1930)
- The Secret Lover (1931)
- Pack Mule (1931)
- Fruit on the Bough (1931)
- Log of a Naval Officer's Wife (1932)
- Better to Marry (1933)
- Wonder Cruise (1933)
- Pastoral (1934)
- Laughter in Cheyne Walk (1936)
- Three Cedars (1937)
- These Roots Go Deep (1937)
- Marriage of Pierrot (1937)
- A Cad's Guide to Cruising (1938)
- The Laughing Lady (1938)
- The Golden Venture (1938)
- The ABC of Authorship (1938)
- Beloved Creditor (1939)
- No Lady Meets No Gentleman (1940)
- The Flying Swans (1940)
- Golden Flame (1941)
- Age Cannot Wither (1942)
- Time, Tide and I (1942)
- Marriage in Heaven (1943)
- A Robin in a Cage (1943)
- The Fourth Cedar (1944)
- No Lady in Bed (1944)
- Me After the War: A Book for Girls Considering the Future (1944)
- Rude Forefathers (1945)
- The Changed Village (1945)
- The Faithless Dove (1945)
- The Painted Lady (1945)
- You and Your Child (1946)
- You and Your Holiday (1946)
- A Garden for My Child (1946)
- Three Sons (1946)
- Caravan for Three (1947)
- No Lady With a Pen (1947)
- Pumpkin the Pup (1947)
- Three Sisters (1947)
- Gipsy Flower (1949)
- Next Tuesday (1949)
- No Lady in the Cart (1949)
- You and Your Looks (1949)
- You and Your Needle (1950)
- You and Your Fun (1950)
- The Song of Philomel (1950)
- Three Girls Come to Town (1950)
- The King's Wife (1950)
- Mum's Girl Was No Lady (1951)
- How Dark My Lady! (1951)
- Pavilion (1952)
- Moon Song (1952)
- Nightshade at Morning (1952)
- Twilight of a Tudor (1953)
- The Gracious Lady (1953)
- Marriage of Leonora (1953)
- The Girl's Book of Popular Hobbies (1954)
- Hitler's Eva (1954)
- Trilogy (1954)
- Curtain Call for the Guv'nor (1954) the story of George Edwardes
- Matthew, Mark, Luke and John (1954)
- Daughters of the Rectory (1955)
- The Tides of Spring Flow Fast (1956)
- The Silver Ring (1956)
- Victorian Vinaigrette (1956)
- No Lady Has a Dog's Day (1956)
- The Girl Who Loved Crippen (1957) the story of Dr Crippen and Ethel Le Neve
- Brief Springtime (1957)
- The Elegant Edwardian (1957)
- The Abiding City (1958)
- Down to the Sea in Ships (1958)
- Monkey Tree in a Flower Pot (1958)
- Down to the Sea in Ships (1958)
- He Lit the Lamp: A Biography of Professor A. M. Low (1958) the story of Archibald Low
- Youth at the Gate (1959)
- Undarkening Green (1959)
- The Inspired Needle (1959)
- Sixty Years of Home (1960)
- The Thieving Magpie (1960)
- The Romance of Charles Dickens (1960)
- The Cactus Has Courage (1961)
- War isn't Wonderful (1961)
- A Sailor's Love (1961)
- Prelude to Yesterday (1961)
- Harvest-Home Come Sunday (1962)
- Ship in a Bottle (1962)
- Parson Extraordinary (1963) the story of Bloom's father, the Reverend James Harvey Bloom
- The Gated Road (1963)
- Mrs Bunthorpe's Respects (1963)
- The Rose of Norfolk (1964) the story of Bloom's great-grandmother Frances Graver
- The House That Died Alone (1964)
- The Ring Tree (1964)
- The Ugly Head (1965)
- Price Above Rubies (1965)
- The Mightier Sword (1966) the story of Bloom's forays into journalism
- The Dandelion Clock (1966)
- Rosemary for Stratford-on-Avon (1966) the story of the town by Bloom while she was living there
- A Roof and Four Walls (1967)
- Two Pools in a Field (1967)
- The Old Adam (1967)
- Casualty Ward (1968)
- Mediterranean Madness (1968)
- Weep Not for Dreams (1968)
- The Dragonfly (1968)
- The Flight of the Falcon (1969)
- The House of Kent (1969)
- The Hunter's Moon (1969)
- The Tune of Time (1970)
- Rosemary for Frinton (1970)
- The Caravan of Chance (1971)
- Rosemary for Chelsea (1971)
- The Duke of Windsor (1972)
- Edwardian Day-dream (1972)
- The Ten Day Queen (1972)
- Cheval Glass (1973)
- The Old Rectory (1973)
- The Old Elm Tree (1974)
- Mirage on the Horizon (1974)
- The Twisted Road (1975)
- Life is No Fairy Tale (1976)
- The Turn of Life's Tide (1976)
- The Great Queen Consort (1976) the story of Queen Mary
- The House on the Hill (1977)
- Now Barabbas Was a Robber (1977)
- Edward and Victoria (1977) the story of Queen Victoria and Edward VII
- Woman Doctor (1978)

=== as Sheila Burns ===
- The Passionate Adventure (1936)
- Wonder Trip (1939)
- The Stronger Passion (1941)
- Romance of Jenny W.R.E.N. (1945)
- Week-end Bride (1946)
- Air Liner (1948)
- Love Me To-morrow (1952)
- The Lasting Lover (1959)
- Theatre Sisters in Love (1963)
- Acting Sister (1968)
- Cornish Rhapsody (1972)
- The Bells Still Ring (1976)

=== as Mary Essex ===
- Haircut For Samson (1940)
- Nesting Cats (1941)
- Eve Didn't Care (1941)
- Marry To Taste (1942)
- Freddy For Fun (1943)
- The Amorous Bicycle (1944)
- Young Kangaroos Prefer Riding (1947)
- Six Fools and a Fairy (1948)
- Full Fruit Flavour (1949)
- Tea is so Intoxicating (1950)
- A Gentleman Called James (1951)

=== as Lozania Prole ===
- Our Dearest Emma (1949)
- The Enchanting Courtesan (1955)
- When Doctors Love (1958)
- The Wild Daughter (1963)
- Henry's Golden Queen (1964)
- Marlborough's Unfair Lady (1965)

=== as Rachel Harvey ===
- The Loves of a Virgin Princess (1968)
- Nurse on Bodmin Moor (1970)
- The Love Story of Nurse Julie (1975)
