= List of British films of 1937 =

British films released in 1937

A list of British films released in 1937.

== A–H ==
Title	Director	Cast	Genre	Notes
Action for Slander	Tim Whelan	Clive Brook, Ann Todd, Margaretta Scott	Drama	
Against the Tide	Alex Bryce	Robert Cochran, Cathleen Nesbitt, Linden Travers	Drama	
The Angelus	Thomas Bentley	Anthony Bushell, Nancy O'Neil, Eve Gray	Crime	
Aren't Men Beasts!	Graham Cutts	Robertson Hare, Alfred Drayton, June Clyde	Comedy	
Auld Lang Syne	James A. Fitzpatrick	Andrew Cruickshank, Jenny Laird, Vi Kaley	Historical	
Beauty and the Barge	Henry Edwards	Gordon Harker, Judy Gunn, Jack Hawkins	Comedy	
Behind Your Back	Donovan Pedelty	Jack Livesey, Dinah Sheridan, Betty Astell	Drama	
Big Fella	J. Elder Wills	Paul Robeson, Elisabeth Welch, Roy Emerton	Musical drama	
The Black Tulip	Alex Bryce	Patrick Waddington, Campbell Gullan, Bernard Lee	Historical	
Boys Will Be Girls	Gilbert Pratt	Leslie Fuller, Greta Gynt, Judy Kelly	Comedy	
Brief Ecstasy	Edmond T. Gréville	Paul Lukas, Hugh Williams, Linden Travers	Drama	
Bulldog Drummond at Bay	Norman Lee	John Lodge, Dorothy Mackaill, Claud Allister	Thriller	
Cafe Colette	Paul L. Stein	Paul Cavanagh, Greta Nissen, Sally Gray	Thriller	
Calling All Ma's	Redd Davis	Billy Caryll, Hilda Mundy, Margaret Yarde	Comedy	
Calling All Stars	Herbert Smith	Carroll Gibbons, Evelyn Dall, Arthur Askey	Musical	
Captain's Orders	Ivar Campbell	Henry Edwards, Jane Carr, Basil Radford	Drama	
Catch As Catch Can	Roy Kellino	James Mason, Eddie Pola, Finlay Currie	Crime	
The Cavalier of the Streets	Harold French	Margaret Vyner, Patrick Barr, Carl Harbord	Comedy	
Change for a Sovereign	Maurice Elvey	Seymour Hicks, Chili Bouchier, Bruce Lester	Comedy	
Clothes and the Woman	Albert de Courville	Rod La Rocque, Tucker McGuire, Alastair Sim	Romance	
Command Performance	Sinclair Hill	Arthur Tracy, Lilli Palmer, Mark Daly	Musical	
The Compulsory Wife	Arthur B. Woods	Henry Kendall, Joyce Kirby, George Merritt	Comedy	
Concerning Mr. Martin	Roy Kellino	Wilson Barrett, William Devlin, Billy Wells	Thriller	
Cotton Queen	Bernard Vorhaus	Stanley Holloway, Will Fyffe, Mary Lawson	Comedy	
Cross My Heart	Bernard Mainwaring	Kathleen Gibson, Kenne Duncan, Aubrey Fitzgerald	Drama	
Darby and Joan	Syd Courtenay	Peggy Simpson, Ian Fleming, Tod Slaughter	Drama	
Dark Journey	Victor Saville	Conrad Veidt, Vivien Leigh, Joan Gardner	War thriller	
Death Croons the Blues	David MacDonald	Hugh Wakefield, Antoinette Cellier, George Hayes	Crime	
Dinner at the Ritz	Harold D. Schuster	Annabella, David Niven, Paul Lukas	Mystery	
Doctor Syn	Roy William Neill	George Arliss, Margaret Lockwood, John Loder	Adventure	
The Dominant Sex	Herbert Brenon	Phillips Holmes, Diana Churchill, Carol Goodner	Comedy	
Don't Get Me Wrong	Arthur B. Woods, Reginald Purdell	Max Miller, Olive Blakeney, Clifford Heatherley	Comedy	
Double Alibi	David MacDonald	Ernest Sefton, John Warwick, Linden Travers	Crime	
Double Exposures	John Paddy Carstairs	Basil Langton, Julien Mitchell, Ruby Miller	Crime	
Dreaming Lips	Paul Czinner	Elisabeth Bergner, Raymond Massey, Romney Brent	Drama	
East of Ludgate Hill	Manning Haynes	Hal Gordon, Aubrey Mallalieu, Nancy O'Neil	Drama	
The Edge of the World	Michael Powell	John Laurie, Belle Chrystall, Finlay Currie	Drama	
The Elder Brother	Frederick Hayward	John Stuart, Marjorie Taylor, Basil Langton	Drama	
Elephant Boy	Zoltan Korda, Robert J. Flaherty	Sabu, Allan Jeayes, Wilfrid Hyde-White	Adventure	
False Evidence	Donovan Pedelty	Gwenllian Gill, Ralph Michael, Michael Hogarth	Crime	
Farewell Again	Tim Whelan	Leslie Banks, Flora Robson, Robert Newton	Drama	
Farewell to Cinderella	Maclean Rogers	John Robinson, Glennis Lorimer, Sebastian Smith	Romance	
The Fatal Hour	George Pearson	Edward Rigby, Moore Marriott, Derek Gorst	Drama	
Father Steps Out	Maclean Rogers	George Carney, Dinah Sheridan, Peter Gawthorne	Comedy	
Feather Your Nest	William Beaudine	George Formby, Polly Ward, Enid Stamp-Taylor	Comedy	
Fifty-Shilling Boxer	Maclean Rogers	Bruce Seton, Nancy O'Neil, Moore Marriott	Sport	
Fine Feathers	Leslie S. Hiscott	Jack Hobbs, Renée Houston Francis L. Sullivan	Musical	
Fire Over England	William K. Howard	Laurence Olivier, Vivien Leigh, Raymond Massey	Drama	
First Night	Donovan Pedelty	Jack Livesey, Sunday Wilshin, Bill Shine	Drama	
The Five Pound Man	Albert Parker	Judy Gunn, Edwin Styles, Esma Cannon	Comedy crime	
For Valour	Tom Walls	Tom Walls, Ralph Lynn, Veronica Rose	Comedy	
French Leave	Norman Lee	Betty Lynne, Edmund Breon, John Longden	Comedy	
The Frog	Jack Raymond	Gordon Harker, Jack Hawkins, Carol Goodner	Thriller	
The Gang Show	Alfred J. Goulding	Ralph Reader, Gina Malo, Richard Ainley	Musical	
Gangway	Sonnie Hale	Jessie Matthews, Barry MacKay, Alastair Sim	Musical	
The Girl in the Taxi	André Berthomieu	Frances Day, Henri Garat, Jean Gillie	Comedy	
Glamorous Night	Brian Desmond Hurst	Mary Ellis, Otto Kruger, Barry MacKay	Drama	
Good Morning, Boys	Marcel Varnel	Will Hay, Martita Hunt, Peter Gawthorne	Comedy	
The Great Barrier	Milton Rosmer, Geoffrey Barkas	Richard Arlen, Lilli Palmer, Antoinette Cellier	Historical	
The Green Cockatoo	William Cameron Menzies	John Mills, René Ray, Robert Newton	Crime	
Gypsy	Roy William Neill	Roland Young, Chili Bouchier, Hugh Williams	Drama	
Head over Heels	Sonnie Hale	Jessie Matthews, Robert Flemyng, Louis Borel	Musical	
The High Command	Thorold Dickinson	Lionel Atwill, Lucie Mannheim, James Mason	Drama	
Holiday's End	John Paddy Carstairs	Rosalyn Boulter, Wally Patch, Leslie Bradley	Mystery	

== I–R ==
Title	Director	Cast	Genre	Notes
I, Claudius	Josef von Sternberg	Charles Laughton, Emlyn Williams, Merle Oberon	Historical	Uncompleted adaptation of Robert Graves's novel
Intimate Relations	Clayton Hutton	June Clyde, Garry Marsh, Jack Hobbs	Comedy	
It's a Grand Old World	Herbert Smith	Gina Malo, Sandy Powell, Cyril Ritchard	Comedy	
It's Never Too Late to Mend	David MacDonald	Tod Slaughter, Jack Livesey, Marjorie Taylor	Melodrama	
It's Not Cricket	Ralph Ince	Claude Hulbert, Henry Kendall, Betty Lynne	Comedy	
Jennifer Hale	Bernard Mainwaring	René Ray, Ballard Berkeley, John Longden	Crime	
Jericho	Thornton Freeland	Paul Robeson, Henry Wilcoxon, Wallace Ford	Adventure	
Jump for Glory	Raoul Walsh	Douglas Fairbanks Jr., Valerie Hobson, Alan Hale	Drama	
Kathleen Mavourneen	Norman Lee	Sally O'Neil, Tom Burke, Jeanne Stuart	Musical	
Keep Fit	Anthony Kimmins	George Formby, Kay Walsh, Guy Middleton	Comedy	
King Solomon's Mines	Robert Stevenson, Geoffrey Barkas	Cedric Hardwicke, Anna Lee, Paul Robeson	Adventure	Based on novel by H. Rider Haggard
Knight Without Armour	Jacques Feyder	Marlene Dietrich, Robert Donat, Irene Vanbrugh	Drama	
Knights for a Day	Norman Lee	Nelson Keys, John Garrick, Nancy Burne	Comedy	
Lancashire Luck	Henry Cass	George Carney, Wendy Hiller, Nigel Stock	Comedy	
Landslide	Donovan Pedelty	Jimmy Hanley, Dinah Sheridan, Elizabeth Inglis	Drama	
The Last Adventurers	Roy Kellino	Niall MacGinnis, Linden Travers, Kay Walsh	Drama	
The Last Chance	Thomas Bentley	Frank Leighton, Judy Kelly, Laurence Hanray	Drama	
The Last Curtain	David MacDonald	Campbell Gullan, Kenne Duncan, Greta Gynt	Crime	
The Last Rose of Summer	James A. FitzPatrick	John Garrick, Cecil Ramage, Kathleen Gibson	Musical	
Leave It to Me	Herbert Smith	Sandy Powell, Franklin Dyall, Garry Marsh	Comedy	
Let's Make a Night of It	Graham Cutts	Charles "Buddy" Rogers, June Clyde, Claire Luce	Comedy	
The Lilac Domino	Frederic Zelnik	June Knight, Fred Emney, Richard Dolman	Musical	
Little Miss Somebody	Walter Tennyson	Binkie Stuart, Kathleen Kelly, Jane Carr	Drama	
The Live Wire	Herbert Brenon	Bernard Nedell, Felix Aylmer, Jean Gillie	Comedy	
London Melody	Herbert Wilcox	Anna Neagle, Tullio Carminati, Robert Douglas	Musical	
Love from a Stranger	Rowland V. Lee	Ann Harding, Basil Rathbone, Binnie Hale	Thriller	
Lucky Jade	Walter Summers	Betty Ann Davies, John Warwick, Syd Crossley	Comedy crime	
Macushla	Alex Bryce	Liam Gaffney, Max Adrian, Edgar K. Bruce	Drama	
Make-Up	Alfred Zeisler	Nils Asther, June Clyde, Judy Kelly	Drama	
The Man Who Could Work Miracles	Lothar Mendes	Roland Young, Ralph Richardson	Fantasy	
The Man Who Made Diamonds	Ralph Ince	Noel Madison, James Stephenson, Lesley Brook	Crime	
Mayfair Melody	Arthur B. Woods	Keith Falkner, Chili Bouchier, Bruce Lester	Musical	
Melody and Romance	Maurice Elvey	Hughie Green, Margaret Lockwood, Alastair Sim	Comedy	
Member of the Jury	Bernard Mainwaring	Ellis Irving, Marjorie Hume, Franklyn Bellamy	Crime	
Merry Comes to Town	George King	Zasu Pitts, Guy Newall, Betty Ann Davies	Comedy	
Midnight Menace	Sinclair Hill	Charles Farrell, Margaret Vyner, Fritz Kortner	Thriller	
Millions	Leslie S. Hiscott	Gordon Harker, Frank Pettingell, Jane Carr	Comedy	
The Minstrel Boy	Sidney Morgan	Fred Conyngham, Chili Bouchier, Lucille Lisle	Musical	
Missing, Believed Married	John Paddy Carstairs	Wally Patch, Julian Vedey, Hazel Terry	Comedy	
Moonlight Sonata	Lothar Mendes	Ignacy Jan Paderewski, Charles Farrell, Eric Portman	Drama	
Mr. Smith Carries On	Lister Laurance	Edward Rigby, Julien Mitchell, Basil Langton	Crime	
Museum Mystery	Clifford Gulliver	Elizabeth Inglis, Gerald Case, Charles Paton	Crime	
The Mutiny of the Elsinore	Roy Lockwood	Lyn Harding, Paul Lukas, Kathleen Kelly	Action	
Night Ride	John Paddy Carstairs	Wally Patch, Jimmy Hanley, Julian Vedey	Drama	
Non-Stop New York	Robert Stevenson	John Loder, Anna Lee, Francis L. Sullivan	Crime	
O.H.M.S.	Raoul Walsh	Wallace Ford, John Mills, Anna Lee	Action comedy	
O-Kay for Sound	Marcel Varnel	The Crazy Gang, Fred Duprez, Enid Stamp Taylor	Comedy	
Oh, Mr Porter!	Marcel Varnel	Will Hay, Graham Moffatt, Moore Marriott	Comedy	
Old Mother Riley	Oswald Mitchell	Arthur Lucan, Kitty McShane, Barbara Everest	Comedy	
Our Fighting Navy	Norman Walker	Robert Douglas, Richard Cromwell, Hazel Terry	Action	
Over She Goes	Graham Cutts	Stanley Lupino, Claire Luce, Max Baer	Musical comedy	
Paradise for Two	Thornton Freeland	Jack Hulbert, Patricia Ellis, Googie Withers	Comedy	
Passenger to London	Lawrence Huntington	John Warwick, Jenny Laird, Nigel Barrie	Thriller	
Patricia Gets Her Man	Reginald Purdell	Hans Söhnker, Lesley Brook, Edwin Styles	Comedy	
Pearls Bring Tears	Manning Haynes	John Stuart, Dorothy Boyd, Googie Withers	Comedy	
The Penny Pool	George Black	Douglas Wakefield, Gabrielle Brune, Tommy Fields	Comedy	
The Perfect Crime	Ralph Ince	Ralph Ince, Hugh Williams, Glen Alyn	Crime	
Please Teacher	Stafford Dickens	Bobby Howes, René Ray, Wylie Watson	Comedy	
The Price of Folly	Walter Summers	Leonora Corbett, Colin Keith-Johnston, Judy Kelly	Drama	
Racing Romance	Maclean Rogers	Bruce Seton, Marjorie Taylor, Eliot Makeham	Comedy	
The Rat	Thomas Bentley	Anton Walbrook, Ruth Chatterton, Rene Ray	Drama	
Return of the Scarlet Pimpernel	Hanns Schwarz	Barry K. Barnes, James Mason, Margaretta Scott	Thriller	
Return of a Stranger	Victor Hanbury	Griffith Jones, Rosalyn Boulter, Athole Stewart	Drama	
The Reverse Be My Lot	Raymond Stross	Ian Fleming, Marjorie Corbett, Mickey Brantford	Drama	
Rhythm Racketeer	James Seymour	Harry Roy, Princess Pearl, Norma Varden	Musical	
Riding High	David MacDonald	Claude Dampier, John Garrick, Kathleen Gibson	Comedy	
The Robber Symphony	Friedrich Feher	Françoise Rosay, Magda Sonja, George Graves	Musical	
A Romance in Flanders	Maurice Elvey	Paul Cavanagh, Marcelle Chantal, Garry Marsh	Drama	
Rose of Tralee	Oswald Mitchell	Binkie Stuart, Kathleen O'Regan, Fred Conyngham	Musical	

== S–Z ==
Title	Director	Cast	Genre	Notes
Said O'Reilly to McNab	William Beaudine	Will Mahoney, Will Fyffe, Percy Parsons	Comedy	
Sam Small Leaves Town	Alfred J. Goulding	Stanley Holloway, June Clyde, Fred Conyngham	Comedy	
Saturday Night Revue	Norman Lee	Billy Milton, Sally Gray, Betty Lynne	Musical	
School for Husbands	Andrew Marton	Rex Harrison, Diana Churchill, June Clyde	Comedy	
The Schooner Gang	W. Devenport Hackney	Vesta Victoria, Gerald Barry, Frank Atkinson	Crime	
Secret Lives	Edmond T. Gréville	Brigitte Horney, Neil Hamilton, Raymond Lovell	Drama	
The Show Goes On	Basil Dean	Gracie Fields, Owen Nares, John Stuart	Musical	
Side Street Angel	Ralph Ince	Hugh Williams, Lesley Brook, Henry Kendall	Comedy	
Silver Blaze	Thomas Bentley	Arthur Wontner, Ian Fleming, Lyn Harding	Mystery	
Sing as You Swing	Redd Davis	Evelyn Dall, Claude Dampier, Lu Ann Meredith	Musical	
Smash and Grab	Tim Whelan	Jack Buchanan, Elsie Randolph, Anthony Holles	Comedy crime	
Song of the Forge	Henry Edwards	Stanley Holloway, Lawrence Grossmith, Davy Burnaby	Musical	
The Song of the Road	John Baxter	Bransby Williams, Muriel George, Tod Slaughter	Drama	
Splinters in the Air	Alfred J. Goulding	Sydney Howard, Richard Hearne, Ellen Pollock	Comedy	
Spring Handicap	Herbert Brenon	Will Fyffe, Maire O'Neill, Aileen Marson	Comedy	
The Squeaker	William K. Howard	Edmund Lowe, Sebastian Shaw, Ann Todd	Crime	
Storm in a Teacup	Ian Dalrymple, Victor Saville	Vivien Leigh, Rex Harrison, Cecil Parker	Comedy	
Strange Adventures of Mr. Smith	Maclean Rogers	Gus McNaughton, Norma Varden, Eve Gray	Comedy	
Strange Experiment	Albert Parker	Donald Gray, Mary Newcomb, Alastair Sim	Drama	
The Street Singer	Jean de Marguenat	Margaret Lockwood, Arthur Tracy, Arthur Riscoe	Musical	
Sunset in Vienna	Norman Walker	Tullio Carminati, Lilli Palmer, John Garrick	Musical	
Talking Feet	John Baxter	Hazel Ascot, Jack Barty, Davy Burnaby, Enid Stamp Taylor	Musical	
Take a Chance	Sinclair Hill	Claude Hulbert, Binnie Hale, Enid Stamp Taylor	Comedy	
Take It from Me	William Beaudine	Max Miller, Betty Lynne, Buddy Baer	Comedy	
Take My Tip	Herbert Mason	Jack Hulbert, Cicely Courtneidge, Harold Huth	Musical comedy	
Television Talent	Robert Edmunds	Hal Walters, Polly Ward, Richard Goolden	Comedy	
There Was a Young Man	Albert Parker	Oliver Wakefield, Nancy O'Neil, Clifford Heatherley	Comedy	
Thunder in the City	Marion Gering	Edward G. Robinson, Nigel Bruce, Ralph Richardson	Drama	
The Ticket of Leave Man	George King	Tod Slaughter, Marjorie Taylor, John Warwick	Thriller	
Twin Faces	Lawrence Huntington	Anthony Ireland, Frank Birch, Francesca Bahrle	Crime	
Under a Cloud	George King	Betty Ann Davies, Edward Rigby, Hilda Bayley	Drama	
Under the Red Robe	Victor Sjostrom	Conrad Veidt, Raymond Massey, Annabella	Historical	
Under Secret Orders	Edmond T. Gréville	Erich von Stroheim, Dita Parlo, John Loder	Thriller	
Underneath the Arches	Redd Davis	Bud Flanagan, Chesney Allen, Enid Stamp Taylor	Comedy	
The Vicar of Bray	Henry Edwards	Stanley Holloway, Hugh Miller, Garry Marsh	Historical drama	
Victoria the Great	Herbert Wilcox	Anna Neagle, Anton Walbrook, Walter Rilla	Biopic	
The Vulture	Ralph Ince	Claude Hulbert, Lesley Brook, Hal Walters	Comedy	
Wake Up Famous	Gene Gerrard	Gene Gerrard, Nelson Keys, Fred Conyngham	Comedy	
Wanted!	George King	ZaSu Pitts, Claude Dampier, Norma Varden	Comedy	
When the Devil Was Well	Maclean Rogers	Jack Hobbs, Eve Gray, Gerald Rawlinson	Drama	
Who Killed John Savage?	Maurice Elvey	Nicholas Hannen, Kathleen Kelly, Edward Chapman	Crime	
Who's Your Lady Friend?	Carol Reed	Frances Day, Vic Oliver, Margaret Lockwood	Comedy	
Why Pick on Me?	Maclean Rogers	Wylie Watson, Jack Hobbs, Sybil Grove	Comedy	
The Wife of General Ling	Ladislao Vajda	Griffith Jones, Valéry Inkijinoff, Gabrielle Brune	Drama	
The Windmill	Arthur B. Woods	Hugh Williams, Glen Alyn, Henry Mollison	Drama	
Wings of the Morning	Harold D. Schuster	Annabella, Henry Fonda, Leslie Banks	Drama	First technicolor film shot in the British Isles
Wise Guys	Harry Langdon	Charlie Naughton, Jimmy Gold, Robert Nainby	Comedy	
You Live and Learn	Arthur B. Woods	Glenda Farrell, Claude Hulbert, Glen Alyn	Comedy	
Young and Innocent	Alfred Hitchcock	Nova Pilbeam, Derrick De Marney, Percy Marmont	Mystery	

== Documentary and short films ==
Title	Director	Cast	Genre	Notes
The Academy Decides	John Baxter	April Vivian, Henry Oscar	Drama	
Carry on London	R. A. Hopwood	Tom Warden, Stan West	Musical	
Song in Soho	Reginald Hopwood	Paddy Browne, Gus Chevalier	Musical	
Windmill Revels	Reginald Hopwood	Ivor Beddoes, Paddy Browne	Musical	

== See also ==
- 1937 in British music
- 1937 in British television
- 1937 in the United Kingdom
