= Michael Ripper =

British actor (1913– 2000)

- Born: Michael George Ripper; 27 January 1913; Portsmouth, Hampshire, England
- Died: 28 June 2000 (aged 87); London, England
- Education: Central School of Speech and Drama
- Occupation: Actor
- Years active: 1936–1992
- Spouses: Jean Bramley (m. 1934–1947) Catherine Finn (m. 1972–1978) Cecelia Doidge (m. 1995)
- Children: 2

Michael George Ripper (27 January 1913 – 28 June 2000) was an English character actor who appeared in many British horror, comedy and science fiction films.

== Career ==
Ripper began his film career in quota quickies in the 1930s and until the late 1950s was virtually unknown; he was seldom credited. Along with Michael Gough he played one of the two murderers in Laurence Olivier's film version of Richard III (1955).

From the late 1940s Ripper became a mainstay in Hammer Film Productions playing supporting character roles: coachmen, peasants, tavern keepers, pirates, soldiers, and sidekicks. Appearing in more of the company's films than any other performer, these included There Is No Escape (1948), X the Unknown (1956), The Camp on Blood Island (1958), The Revenge of Frankenstein (1958), The Mummy (1959), The Brides of Dracula (1960), Captain Clegg (1962), The Scarlet Blade (1963), The Reptile (1966), The Plague of the Zombies (1966) and The Mummy's Shroud (1967).

Some of Ripper's parts were little better than glorified bits (as in The Curse of the Werewolf (1961)), but his penultimate role for Hammer Films was a significant supporting part as a landlord in Scars of Dracula in 1970. (His last Hammer role was as a railway worker in the atypical comedy That's Your Funeral two years later.)

Ripper is also well remembered for his role as a jockey/horse trainer in The Belles of St. Trinian's (1954) and the liftman in the next three of the St. Trinian's comedies, and on television for his role as Thomas the chauffeur in the BBC comedy Butterflies (1978–83) and as Burke, one of the two criminals in the youth television series Freewheelers (1968–71).

Ripper's other television roles include Mr Shepherd, Aunt Sally's owner, in Worzel Gummidge, a judge in "Voice in The Night", a 1958 episode of The Adventures of William Tell, in a 1960 episode of Danger Man entitled "The Lovers" in the role of Miguel Torres, as well as in the 1962 episode entitled "The Island" as Kane, Phunkey in The Pickwick Papers (1985) and the Drones Porter in Jeeves and Wooster (1990–91).

== Partial filmography ==
- Twice Branded (1936) – Minor role (uncredited)
- Prison Breaker (1936) – (uncredited)
- Not So Dusty (1936) – Bit Role (uncredited)
- To Catch a Thief (1936) – (uncredited)
- The Heirloom Mystery (1936)
- Nothing Like Publicity (1936) – (uncredited)
- Pearls Bring Tears (1937) – (uncredited)
- Busman's Holiday (1937) – Crook
- Farewell to Cinderella (1937) – Undetermined Role (uncredited)
- Strange Adventures of Mr. Smith (1937) – Undetermined Role (uncredited)
- Fifty-Shilling Boxer (1937) – (uncredited)
- Father Steps Out (1937) – Minor Role (uncredited)
- Why Pick on Me? (1937) – (uncredited)
- Easy Riches (1938) – Cuthbert
- Paid in Error (1938) – Minor Role (uncredited)
- His Lordship Regrets (1938) – (uncredited)
- You're the Doctor (1938) – (uncredited)
- His Lordship Goes to Press (1938) – (uncredited)
- Luck of the Navy (1938)
- Miracles Do Happen (1938) – Morning Comet Reporter (uncredited)
- Blind Folly (1939) – (uncredited)
- Captain Boycott (1947) – Pat Nolan
- Oliver Twist (1948) – Barney
- The Dark Road (1948) – Andy Anderson
- Noose (1948) – Nelson (uncredited)
- The History of Mr. Polly (1949) – Third Store Employee Carrying Packages (uncredited)
- The Rocking Horse Winner (1949) – 2nd Chauffeur (uncredited)
- The Adventures of PC 49 Investigating the Case of the Guardian Angel (1949) – Fingers
- Your Witness (1950) – Samuel 'Sam' Baxter
- Let's Have a Murder (1950) - Gunman
- A Case for PC 49 (1951) – George Steele
- Lady Godiva Rides Again (1951) – Joe (stage manager)
- Old Mother Riley's Jungle Treasure (1951) – Jake
- Secret People (1952) – Charlie
- Treasure Hunt (1952) – Removal Man (uncredited)
- Derby Day (1952) – 1st Newspaper Reporter (uncredited)
- Folly to Be Wise (1952) – Drill Corporal
- Alf's Baby (1953) – Mike
- The Story of Gilbert and Sullivan (1953) – Louis
- Appointment in London (1953) – Bomb Aimer
- Blood Orange (1953) – Eddie
- The Intruder (1953) – Mechanic
- Personal Affair (1953) – Reporter (uncredited)
- The Rainbow Jacket (1954) – Benny Loder
- The Belles of St. Trinian's (1954) – Albert Faning
- The Sea Shall Not Have Them (1954) – Botterhill
- Tale of Three Women (1954) – Simkins (segment "Thief of London' story)
- The Constant Husband (1955) – Left Luggage Attendant
- Geordie (1955) – Reporter
- Secret Venture (1955) – Bill Rymer
- Richard III (1955) – Forrest, 2nd murderer
- A Man on the Beach (1955) - as Unnamed Chauffeur
- 1984 (1956) – Outer Party Orator
- Yield to the Night (1956) – Roy, bar good-timer
- Reach for the Sky (1956) – Warrant Officer West
- The Green Man (1956) – Waiter
- X the Unknown (1956) – Sgt. Harry Grimsdyke
- The Steel Bayonet (1957) – Pvt. Middleditch
- Quatermass 2 (1957) – Ernie
- Woman in a Dressing Gown (1957) – Pawnbroker
- These Dangerous Years (1957) – Pvt. Simpson
- Not Wanted on Voyage (1957) – Steward Macy
- The One That Got Away (1957) – Corporal (uncredited)
- The Naked Truth (1957) – J.E. Freeman – Greengrocer (uncredited)
- Blue Murder at St Trinian's (1957) – Eric – The Liftman
- The Camp on Blood Island (1958) – Japanese Driver
- Up the Creek (1958) – Decorator
- The Revenge of Frankenstein (1958) – Kurt
- Girls at Sea (1958) – Jumper, Marine
- Further Up the Creek (1958) – Ticket Collector
- I Only Arsked! (1958) – Azim
- Quatermass and the Pit (TV, 1959) – Sergeant
- The Man Who Could Cheat Death (1959) – Morgue Attendant (uncredited)
- Bobbikins (1959) – Naval Petty Officer (uncredited)
- The Mummy (1959) – Poacher
- The Ugly Duckling (1959) – Benny
- Jackpot (1960) – Lenny Lane
- Sink the Bismarck! (1960) – Able Seaman, Lookout 'Suffolk' (uncredited)
- Dead Lucky (1960) – Percy Simpson
- The Brides of Dracula (1960) – Coachman
- Not a Hope in Hell (1960) – Sid
- Circle of Deception (1960) – Monsieur Chauvel
- The Pure Hell of St Trinian's (1960) – Liftman
- The Curse of the Werewolf (1961) – Old Soak
- A Matter of WHO (1961) – Skipper
- Petticoat Pirates (1961) – Tug
- The Pirates of Blood River (1962) – Mack, a pirate
- Captain Clegg (1962) – Jeremiah Mipps (coffinmaker)
- The Phantom of the Opera (1962) – Longfaced Cabbie
- Out of the Fog (1962 film) – Tich
- A Prize of Arms (1962) – Cpl. Freeman
- The Amorous Prawn (1962) – Angus
- Two Left Feet (1963) – Uncle Reg
- The Punch and Judy Man (1963) – Waiter
- What a Crazy World (1963) – The Common Man
- Swallows and Amazons (1963) – Old Billie
- The Scarlet Blade (1963) – Pablo
- The Human Jungle - ( ' The Flip Side Man ', episode ) - as Dublane
- The Devil-Ship Pirates (1964) – Pepe, a pirate
- Every Day's a Holiday (1964) – Mr. George Pullman
- The Curse of the Mummy's Tomb (1964) – Achmed
- The Secret of Blood Island (1964) – Lt Tojoko
- The Spy Who Came in from the Cold (1965) – Lofthouse (uncredited)
- The Plague of the Zombies (1966) – Sergeant Jack Swift
- Rasputin the Mad Monk (1966) – Waggoner (voice, uncredited)
- The Reptile (1966) – Tom Bailey
- The Great St. Trinian's Train Robbery (1966) – The Liftman
- Where the Bullets Fly (1966) – Angel
- The Deadly Bees (1966) – David Hawkins
- The Mummy's Shroud (1967) – Longbarrow
- Torture Garden (1967) – Gordon Roberts (Framework Story)
- Inspector Clouseau (1968) – Steven Frey
- The Lost Continent (1968) – Sea Lawyer
- Dracula Has Risen from the Grave (1968) – Max
- Journey into Darkness (1968) – Albert Cole (episode 'Paper Dolls')
- Moon Zero Two (1969) – 1st Card Player
- Mumsy, Nanny, Sonny and Girly (1970) – Zoo attendant
- Taste the Blood of Dracula (1970) – Cobb
- Scars of Dracula (1970) – Landlord
- That's Your Funeral (1972) – Arthur (Railway Porter)
- The Creeping Flesh (1973) – Carter
- No Sex Please, We're British (1973) – Traffic Warden
- Legend of the Werewolf (1975) – Sewerman
- Unipart TV advert (1970s) "Thousands of Parts for Millions of Cars", with Peter Cleall
- The Sweeney (TV 1975) Herbie Mew.
- The Prince and the Pauper (1977) – Edith's Servant
- Sammy's Super T-Shirt (1978) – Gateman
- Butterflies (1978 - 1983) – Thomas (19 episodes)
- Danger on Dartmoor (1980)
- Lady Killers (1981) – William Seddon
- No Surrender (1985) – Tony Bonaparte
- Revenge of Billy the Kid (1992) – Old Pub Local (final film role)
