= Not So Dusty =

Not So Dusty may refer to:

- Not So Dusty (1936 film), a British comedy film starring Wally Patch
- Not So Dusty (1956 film), a British comedy film starring Bill Owen
- Not So Dusty (album), an Australian tribute album
