= Easy Riches =

1938 British film by Maclean Rogers

- Opening titles
- Directed by: Maclean Rogers
- Written by: John Hunter (original screen story); H.F. Maltby (dialogue)
- Produced by: George Smith
- Starring: George Carney; Gus McNaughton; Molly Hamley-Clifford
- Cinematography: Geoffrey Faithfull
- Edited by: Dan Birt
- Production company: George Smith Productions (as GS Enterprises)
- Distributed by: RKO Pictures (UK)
- Release date: 31 March 1938 (UK)
- Running time: 67 minutes
- Country: United Kingdom
- Language: English

Easy Riches (also known as In the Money) is a 1938 British comedy film directed by Maclean Rogers and starring George Carney, Gus McNaughton, Marjorie Taylor and Tom Helmore. It was written by John Hunter and H.F. Maltby, and was made as a quota quickie.

== Preservation status ==
The British Film Institute National Archive holds the film.

== Plot ==
Sam Miller, owner of a brick-field, and Joe Hicks, a cement works boss, are business rivals in a small town. Sam's son Harry is engaged to Hicks' daughter Dorothy. When Miller wins the contract for the new town hall, he meets Stacey Lang, a crooked financier, who subsequently comes up with an ambitious scheme for a garden city. Miller falls for the scheme and invests heavily, and Hicks comes to the rescue, needlessly as it turns out, because Miller has some unexpected luck.

== Cast ==
- George Carney as Sam Miller
- Gus McNaughton as Joe Hicks
- Molly Hamley-Clifford as Mrs Miller
- Tom Helmore as Harry Miller
- Marjorie Taylor as Dorothy Hicks
- Peter Gawthorne as Stacey Lang
- Aubrey Mallalieu as Mr Marsden
- Michael Ripper as Cuthbert

== Reception ==
The Monthly Film Bulletin wrote: "Gus McNaughton and George Carney, and also Peter Gawthorne as the crook, are all capable actors, but the rest of the cast are awkward and unconvincing with the exception of Molly Hamley-Clifford, who is pleasant as long as she remembers to speak in dialect. The treatment of the plot is very dull and unreal."

Kine Weekly wrote: "Unpretentious but entertaining comedy-drama rivalry between two small-town business men, which has homely humour and sentiment, and neat and readily understandable plot to recommend it as acceptable fare for the masses. ... Gus McNaughton as Hicks and George Carney as Miller are excellent, investing the characters with interest as well as conviction. They largely carry the film on their shoulders. ... Although very good in detail and characterisation, it amounts to little more than a psychological conundrum for the intelligentsia. Specialised hall appeal only is indicated."
