= The Heirloom Mystery =

- Edward Rigby and Gus McNaughton in the film
- Directed by: Maclean Rogers
- Written by: Kathleen Butler; G.H. Moresby-White
- Produced by: A. George Smith
- Starring: Edward Rigby; Mary Glynne; Gus McNaughton; John Robinson
- Cinematography: Geoffrey Faithfull
- Production company: George Smith Productions
- Distributed by: RKO Pictures
- Release date: November 1936
- Running time: 69 minutes
- Country: United Kingdom
- Language: English

The Heirloom Mystery is a 1936 British drama film directed by Maclean Rogers and starring Edward Rigby, Mary Glynne and Gus McNaughton. It was written by Kathleen Butler and G.H. Moresby-White, and was made at the Nettlefold Studios in Walton, as a quota quickie for distribution by RKO Pictures.

== Preservation status ==
The British Film Institute National Archive holds a collection of ephemera and stills but no film or video materials.

== Synopsis ==
After being secretly commissioned by a man to create a replica piece of furniture so he can sell the valuable original without his wife knowing, Charles Marriott's firm finds itself under investigation.

== Cast ==
- Edward Rigby as Charles Marriott
- Mary Glynne as Lady Benton
- Gus McNaughton as Alfred Fisher
- Marjorie Taylor as Mary
- John Robinson as Dick Marriott
- Martin Lewis as Sir Arthur Benton
- Kathleen Gibson as Doris
- Louanne Shaw as Millie
- Bruce Lester as Alf Dene
- H. F. Maltby as Mr. Lewis
- Michael Ripper as minor role

== Reception ==
The Monthly Film Bulletin wrote: "The film is slow, but the acting is fine and carries the story. ... The direction is competent."

Kine Weekly wrote: "A very human little story, rather slow but sound in characterisation. ... It is quite unpretentious, but its obvious sincerity and simple comedy makes it well-worthwhile entertainment. ... Edward Rigby gives an exceedingly good characterisation as the old craftsman; he is the mainstay of the picture. ... Human story, good characterisations, and sincerity of atmosphere."

Picture Show wrote: "Unpretentious but entertaining story ... Edward Rigby gives a human, convincing characterisation, and is excellently supported by Gus McNaughton. The humour is a little strained."
