= Pearls Bring Tears =

- Mark Stone, Dorothy Boyd and John Stuart in the film
- Directed by: Manning Haynes
- Written by: Roy Lockwood
- Story by: Clifford Grey
- Produced by: George Smith
- Starring: John Stuart; Dorothy Boyd; Eve Gray
- Cinematography: Geoffrey Faithfull
- Production company: George Smith Productions
- Distributed by: Columbia Pictures Corporation (UK)
- Release date: March 1937 (UK)
- Running time: 63 minutes
- Country: United Kingdom
- Language: English

Pearls Bring Tears is a 1937 British comedy drama film directed by Manning Haynes and starring John Stuart, Dorothy Boyd and Googie Withers. It was written by Roy Lockwood from a story by Clifford Grey, and was made as a quota quickie.

== Plot ==
Madge Hart borrows a pearl necklace to wear to a dance, but then accidentally breaks it. She is further concerned because the pearls were only on loan to her husband as security for a business deal. Madge then rushes the necklace to be repaired, but when it is stolen, further panic ensues.

== Cast ==
- John Stuart as Harry Willshire
- Dorothy Boyd as Madge Hart
- Eve Gray as Pamela Vane
- Mark Stone as George Hart
- Googie Withers as Doreen
- Aubrey Mallalieu as Mr. Vane
- Annie Esmond as Mrs. Vane
- H.F. Maltby as Mr. Duffield
- Hal Walters as Albert
- Syd Crossley as Parkes
- Isobel Scaife as Mary
- Michael Ripper as jeweller's assistant (uncredited)

== Critical reception ==
Kine Weekly wrote: "A farcical comedy, this British picture does not run out an easy winner in the laughter-making stakes, but it has in its artless story composition the capacity to amuse the not-too sophisticated. The principal players do their stuff, and the simple humour is adequately framed technically. ... H.F. Maltby and Hal Walters portray the leading roles, and it is their tireless enthusiasm that keeps the fun atnear concert pitch"

The Monthly Film Bulletin wrote: "The story is ingeniously worked out and moves briskly from start to finish. The entire cast throw themselves into the fun with gusto and the result is a wellmade, amusing film."

The Daily Film Renter wrote: "The story, fundamentally slight, is eked out by the not always very convincing turns of the plot, and the multiplicity of characters tends to confuse the issue, but since its prevailing mood remains light and there is some quite amusing Cockney humour from the ex-convict and his butler brother, some entertainment value can be extracted."

TV Guide gave the film two out of four stars, calling it "A fast-paced and surprisingly witty comedy."
