= Father Steps Out =

Father Steps Out may refer to:

- Father Steps Out (1937 film), a British comedy starring Dinah Sheridan
- Father Steps Out (1941 film), an American comedy
