= Aubrey Mallalieu =

English actor (1873–1948)

- Born: 8 June 1873; Liverpool, Lancashire, England
- Died: 28 May 1948 (aged 74)
- Occupation: Actor
- Years active: 1890s? – 1948

Aubrey Mallalieu (8 June 1873 – 28 May 1948) was an English actor with a prolific career in supporting roles in films in the 1930s and 1940s.

Mallalieu began life as George William Mallalieu, the son of William Mallalieu (c. 1845–1927), a well-known stage comedian, and his wife Margaret Ellen Smith. He had a sister called Polly who corresponded with Lewis Carroll in the 1890s. He adopted the stage name of Aubrey early in his acting career.

Information is scant on Mallalieu's pre-film career, but he is believed to have had a lengthy stage career before making the move into films. Archive sources available in New Zealand indicate that he spent a considerable number of years touring with stage companies in that country and Australia in the 1900s and 1910s.

In December 1912 Mallalieu was touring Australia with Leal Douglas in a piece called “Feed the Brute”. The two formed a company and took it on a tour of South Africa, and then in May 1913 they travelled together to England on the SS Ballarat, when The Era reported that Mallalieu was returning after an absence of five years.

Mallalieu may also have played supporting roles during the silent film era in Britain, but no named credits have been located as it was rare for supporting players to be name-checked at this period.

Mallalieu's first named film credit dates from 1934, and thereafter he accumulated 115 screen appearances before his death in 1948. These were overwhelmingly minor roles, many in quota quickies and B films, although Mallalieu also played in a considerable number of prestigious and well-known productions such as The Stars Look Down (1940), The Young Mr. Pitt (1942), For You Alone (1945), The Wicked Lady (1945), Frieda (1947) and The Winslow Boy (1948).

== Selected filmography ==
- 1934: What Happened to Harkness? – Dr. Powin
- 1935: The Riverside Murder – Robert Norman
- 1935: Cross Currents – Gen. Trumpington
- 1935: The Last Journey – Mulchester Doctor (uncredited)
- 1935: Play Up the Band – Judge (uncredited)
- 1936: A Touch of the Moon – Mr. Dupare
- 1936: Prison Breaker – Sir Douglas Mergin
- 1936: Sweeney Todd: The Demon Barber of Fleet Street – Trader Paterson
- 1936: Music Hath Charms – Judge
- 1936: Once in a Million
- 1936: Love at Sea – Brighton
- 1936: Not So Dusty – (uncredited)
- 1936: Broken Blossoms – Minor Role (uncredited)
- 1936: A Star Fell from Heaven – Doctor (uncredited)
- 1936: The Tenth Man – Bank Manager
- 1936: Talk of the Devil – (uncredited)
- 1936: Such Is Life – Sallust
- 1936: Parisian Life
- 1936: Nothing Like Publicity – Mr. Dines
- 1937: The Black Tulip – Colonel Marnix
- 1937: Mayfair Melody – Dighton
- 1937: Patricia Gets Her Man – Colonel Fitzroy
- 1937: Pearls Bring Tears – Mr. Vane
- 1937: Strange Adventures of Mr. Smith – Mr. Broadbent
- 1937: Fifty-Shilling Boxer – Charles Day
- 1937: All That Glitters – Flint
- 1937: Silver Blaze – Doctor at Stables (uncredited)
- 1937: Over She Goes – 1st Man with Suitcase (uncredited)
- 1937: Keep Fit – Magistrate
- 1937: Victoria the Great – Bishop at the Palace (uncredited)
- 1937: Change for a Sovereign – Baron Breit
- 1937: The Rat – The Jeweller (uncredited)
- 1937: The Last Chance – Judge Croyle
- 1937: East of Ludgate Hill
- 1937: When the Devil Was Well – Banks
- 1937: The Reverse Be My Lot – Dr. Davidson
- 1937: Holiday's End – Bellamy
- 1938: Easy Riches – Mr. Marsden
- 1938: Paid in Error – George
- 1938: The Claydon Treasure Mystery – Lord Claydon
- 1938: Simply Terrific – Sir Walter Carfax
- 1938: Coming of Age – Mr. Myers
- 1938: Almost a Honeymoon – Clutterbuck
- 1938: Thank Evans – Magistrate
- 1938: His Lordship Regrets – Dawkins
- 1938: Dangerous Medicine – Judge
- 1938: The Return of Carol Deane – Lamont
- 1938: Save a Little Sunshine – Official
- 1938: You're the Doctor – Vicar
- 1938: His Lordship Goes to Press – Hardcastle
- 1938: The Return of the Frog – Banker
- 1938: The Gables Mystery – Sir James Rider
- 1938: Miracles Do Happen – Prof. Gilmore
- 1939: Me and My Pal – Governor
- 1939: Dead Men are Dangerous – Coroner
- 1939: So This Is London – Butler (uncredited)
- 1939: The Face at the Window – M. de Brisson
- 1939: I Killed the Count – Johnson
- 1939: Murder Will Out
- 1940: All at Sea – Prof. Myles
- 1940: 21 Days – Magistrate
- 1940: The Stars Look Down – Hudspeth
- 1940: The Door with Seven Locks – Lord Charles Francis Selford
- 1940: Busman's Honeymoon – Rev. Simon Goodacre
- 1940: The Briggs Family – Milward
- 1940: Bulldog Sees It Through – Magistrate
- 1940: Spare a Copper – Manager of Music Store
- 1940: Salvage with a Smile (Short) – Professor
- 1941: Turned Out Nice Again – Irate Customer (uncredited)
- 1941: "Pimpernel" Smith – Dean
- 1941: Facing the Music
- 1941: Atlantic Ferry – Minor role (uncredited)
- 1941: Mr. Proudfoot Shows a Light (Short) – Chairman
- 1942: The Black Sheep of Whitehall – Ticket Collector
- 1942: Penn of Pennsylvania – King's Chaplain
- 1942: Hatter's Castle – Clergyman
- 1942: Gert and Daisy's Weekend – Barnes
- 1942: The Missing Million – Minor Role
- 1942: Back-Room Boy – West (uncredited)
- 1942: Breach of Promise – Judge
- 1942: They Flew Alone – Bill, the Barber
- 1942: Unpublished Story – Warden (uncredited)
- 1942: Let the People Sing – Cmdr. Spofforth
- 1942: Uncensored – Louis Backer
- 1942: The Goose Steps Out – Rector
- 1942: Gert and Daisy Clean Up – Judge (uncredited)
- 1942: The Young Mr. Pitt – Somerset (uncredited)
- 1942: Asking for Trouble – General Fortescue
- 1943: We'll Meet Again – Stage Door Keeper
- 1943: Squadron Leader X – Pierre
- 1943: The Adventures of Tartu – ARP Warden (uncredited)
- 1943: Rhythm Serenade – Vicar
- 1943: The Dark Tower – Doctor
- 1943: Yellow Canary – Reynolds (uncredited)
- 1943: My Learned Friend – Magistrate
- 1943: Somewhere in Civvies – Doctor (uncredited)
- 1943: The Demi-Paradise – Toomes – the Butler
- 1943: The Lamp Still Burns – Rev. J. Ashton (uncredited)
- 1944: Champagne Charlie – Butler (uncredited)
- 1944: He Snoops to Conquer – Councillor Stubbins
- 1945: Kiss the Bride Goodbye – Rev. Glory
- 1945: A Place of One's Own – Canon Mowbray
- 1945: I Live in Grosvenor Square – Bates
- 1945: For You Alone – Eye Specialist (uncredited)
- 1945: 29 Acacia Avenue – Martin
- 1945: Murder in Reverse – Judge
- 1945: The Wicked Lady – Doctor
- 1946: Under New Management – John Marshall
- 1946: I'll Turn to You – Managing Director (uncredited)
- 1946: Bedelia – Vicar
- 1946: A Girl in a Million – Judge
- 1946: School for Secrets – 1st Club Member
- 1947: While the Sun Shines – Night Porter
- 1947: Meet Me at Dawn – Prefect of Police
- 1947: Frieda – Irvine
- 1947: Master of Bankdam – Dr. Bouviere
- 1947: The Ghosts of Berkeley Square – Butler (uncredited)
- 1948: The Fatal Night – Yokel
- 1948: Counterblast – Maj. Walsh
- 1948: Calling Paul Temple – Waiter at The Falcon Inn
- 1948: Bond Street – Parkins (uncredited)
- 1948: The Winslow Boy – Mr. Roberts (uncredited)
- 1948: Saraband for Dead Lovers – Envoy at Ahlden
- 1949: The Queen of Spades – Fedya
- 1949: The Bad Lord Byron – 1st Old club member (final film role)
