= Racing Romance =

Racing Romance may refer to:

- Racing Romance (1926 film), an American silent action film
- Racing Romance (1937 film), a British comedy film
