= Not a Hope in Hell =

1960 British film by Maclean Rogers

- Trade advertisement
- Directed by: Maclean Rogers
- Screenplay by: Raymond Drew
- Produced by: Roger Proudlock
- Starring: Richard Murdoch; Jon Pertwee; Claude Hulbert
- Cinematography: Geoffrey Faithfull
- Edited by: Peter Pitt
- Production company: Parkside Productions
- Distributed by: Archway
- Release date: 14 March 1960
- Running time: 78 minutes
- Country: United Kingdom
- Language: English

Not a Hope in Hell is a 1960 British second feature ('B') comedy film directed by Maclean Rogers and starring Richard Murdoch, Jon Pertwee and Claude Hulbert. It was written by Raymond Drew and produced by Roger Proudlock at Walton Studios.

== Preservation status ==
The British Film Institute National Archive holds a collection of ephemera and stills but no film or video materials.

== Plot ==
Hell is a small seaside village operating a thriving trade in smuggled wines and spirits. The operation is run by ex-con man Bertie and his henchman Dan, and continues despite the investigations by Customs and Excise, whose officers have previously turned a blind eye when tempted by the unlimited free booze. Then Senior Customs executive Miss Applejohn turns up, accompanied by Cy Hallam, an American customs officer on a learning trip, and TV personality Diana Melton. Dan is signed up to appear on Diana's show; Cy falls for local beauty Jean, and Miss Applejohn, having sampled the free drink on offer, quits her job and joins the smugglers.

== Cast ==
- Richard Murdoch as Bertie
- Jon Pertwee as Dan
- Claude Hulbert as Police Constable Salter
- Tim Turner as Cy Hallam
- Judith Furse as Miss Applejohn
- Stuart Saunders as Bulstrode
- Humphrey Lestocq as Cricklegate
- Zoreen Ismael as Jean
- Bill Shine as Pettigrew
- Michael Ripper as Sid
- Keith Smith as Captain Wotherspoon
- John Boxer as Merriman
- Erik Chitty as Jo

== Reception ==
The Monthly Film Bulletin wrote: "This depressing concoction of nostalgic jokes was assembled in the apparent belief that two phoney Americans, three expert comedians and several stock characters and situations are in themselves enough to provide seventy minutes of entertainment. But since the material and its treatment are feeble in the extreme the title can only be taken as prophetic."

Kine Weekly wrote: "The characters are drawn from stock, but the equally well-known players put some fresh life into them, and the staging is adequate. ... The picture is a new comedy, yet, oddly enough, most of its jokes have an aura of nostalgia. ...The director keeps things moving, and the settings meet modest demands. Its title could be prophetic, but the overall should tickle the undemanding."
