= His Lordship Goes to Press =

1938 British film by Maclean Rogers

- Opening titles
- Directed by: Maclean Rogers
- Written by: Kathleen Butler; H.F. Maltby
- Story by: Margaret McDonell; Gordon McDonell
- Produced by: George Smith
- Starring: Romney Brent; Louise Hampton; Leslie Perrins
- Cinematography: Geoffrey Faithfull
- Edited by: Daniel Birt
- Production company: Canterbury Films
- Distributed by: RKO Pictures (UK)
- Release dates: 21 October 1938 (London, UK)
- Running time: 70 minutes
- Country: United Kingdom
- Language: English
- Budget: £17,674

His Lordship Goes to Press is a 1938 British comedy film directed by Maclean Rogers and starring June Clyde, Hugh Williams, Louise Hampton and Leslie Perrins. It was written by Kathleen Butler and H.F. Maltby from a story by Margaret McDonell and Gordon McDonell, and was made as a quota quickie. The film follows an American reporter who goes to work on a farm for an assignment, where a comedy of mistaken identity ensues.

== Plot ==
Lord Bill Wilmer falls for pretty American journalist Valerie Lee, assigned to cover English farming life. Pretending to be a smallholder, he takes her to a run-down farm next to his estate. Valerie is furious when she discovers she has been duped. In revenge, she concocts a scheme to make him a laughing stock.

== Cast ==
- June Clyde as Valerie Lee
- Hugh Williams as Lord Bill Wilmer
- Louise Hampton as Mrs Hodges
- Leslie Perrins as Sir Richard Swingleton [Wilmer's cousin]
- Romney Brent as Pinkie Butler
- Aubrey Mallalieu as Hardcastle [Wilmer's valet]
- Eve Gray
- Bill Shine (as Billy Shine)
- Paul Sheridan
- H. F. Maltby as General Tukes
- Zillah Bateman as Mrs Tukes
- Sheila Kay
- Arthur Finn

== Reception ==
The Monthly Film Bulletin wrote: "The plot is thin, not very funny and long drawn out."

Kine Weekly wrote: "The theme, which borrows its outline from the Taming of the Shrew, insists upon excursions to the English countryside, and picturesque rural trimmings are one of the ingenuous entertainment's strongest suits. Another is amiable team-work by an attractive and versatile cast. Apart from occasional evidence of excess footage, popular tastes are adequately catered for."

The Daily Film Renter wrote: "Plot is contrived, but has amusing situations and dialogue is provocative of tolerant chuckles. Acting and direction smooth, and production values very good. Popular tastes will relish the comedy twists and the unsubtle fun of the dialogue."
