= Father Steps Out (1937 film) =

1937 British film by Maclean Rogers

- Opening titles
- Directed by: Maclean Rogers
- Written by: Kathleen Butler (adaptation); H. F. Maltby (dialogue)
- Based on: an original story by Henry Holt; Irving LeRoy
- Produced by: George Smith
- Starring: George Carney; Bruce Seton; Dinah Sheridan
- Cinematography: Geoffrey Faithfull
- Edited by: Roy Lockwood
- Production company: George Smith Productions
- Distributed by: RKO Pictures (UK)
- Release date: 13 December 1937 (UK)
- Running time: 64 minutes
- Country: United Kingdom
- Language: English

Father Steps Out is a 1937 British comedy film directed by Maclean Rogers and starring George Carney, Dinah Sheridan, Bruce Seton and Peter Gawthorne. It was written by Kathleen Butler and H. F. Maltby adapted from a story by Henry Holt and Irving LeRoy, and was made as a quota quickie.

A wealthy cheese manufacturer falls prey to con men.

== Preservation status ==
The British Film Institute National Archive holds the film.

== Plot ==
Joe Hardcastle is the wealthy owner of a cheese business. When his daughter Helen falls in love with Philip Fitzwilliam, supposedly a Society man, the Hardcastles are invited to spend a weekend with the Fitzwilliams. Philip's father, a con-artist, sees an opportunity to exploit Joe's wealth and instructs Philip to elope with Helen. Joe's chauffeur Johnnie Miller prevents the elopement, but meanwhile Joe is duped into buying worthless shares. Eventually things work out, Joe recovers his fortune, and Helen finds romance with Johnnie.

== Cast ==
- George Carney as Joe Hardcastle
- Bruce Seton as Johnnie Miller
- Dinah Sheridan as Helen Hardcastle
- Peter Gawthorne as Mr Fitzwilliam
- Vivienne Chatterton as Mrs Hardcastle
- Basil Langton as Philip Fitzwilliam
- Zillah Bateman as Mrs Fitzwilliam
- Elizabeth Kent as Joan
- Isobel Scaife as Alice

== Reception ==
Kine Weekly wrote: "Simple sociological comedy of amiable improbability. It is impossible to believe in the story but many of the characters are real, the majority of the situations are neat, and the dialogue is excellent. ... George Carney portrays good character as Joe, Vivienne Chatterton is true to type as his wife. Peter Gawthorne is suave as Fitzwilliam, and Dinah Sheridan and Bruce Seton score as Helen and Johnnie."

The Daily Film Renter wrote: "Plot, cut to familiar pattern, contrasts homely unpretentiousness of factory owner's home with spurious gentility of snobs who gull him, sincerity of treatment and strong element of caustic Northern wit being principal credits. Unsophisticated but amusing second feature entertainment."

Picture Show wrote: "George Carey gives an excellent performance as a self-made man who is swindled by a couple of crooks posing as Society people, but makes himself another fortune with his last few pounds. The supporting cast is good, settings well chosen."
