= Molly Hamley-Clifford =

British actress (1887–1956)

- Born: Irene Leila Hamley Clifford; 1 August 1887; Exeter, Devon, England
- Died: 7 June 1956 (aged 68); London, England
- Occupation: Actress
- Years active: 1916–1956 (film)

Molly Hamley-Clifford (born Irene Leila Hamley Clifford; 1 August 1887 – 7 June 1956) was a British stage and film actress.

== Early life ==
Clifford was born on 1 August 1887 in Exeter the daughter of George W and Eliza Clifford.

== Selected filmography ==
- Milestones (1916)
- Merely Mrs. Stubbs (1917)
- The Cobweb (1917)
- Spinner o' Dreams (1918)
- The Flying Fool (1931)
- What a Night! (1931)
- Temptation (1934)
- Leave It to Blanche (1934)
- Joy Ride (1935)
- Pay Box Adventure (1936)
- Ticket of Leave (1936)
- Under Secret Orders (1937)
- There Was a Young Man (1937)
- Easy Riches (1938)
- Murder Tomorrow (1938)
- Paid in Error (1938)
- Miracles Do Happen (1939)
- Contraband (1940)
- Deadlock (1943)
- Tawny Pipit (1944)
- Dark Secret (1949)
- Kind Hearts and Coronets (1949)
- The Magnet (1950)
- Meet Mr. Lucifer (1953)
- Street of Shadows (1953)
- The Million Pound Note (1954)
- The Feminine Touch (1956)

== Bibliography ==
- Goble, Alan. The Complete Index to Literary Sources in Film. Walter de Gruyter, 1999.
