= Stella Bonheur =

British actress (1904–1997)

Bonheur, centre, alongside Tom Walls and Ralph Lynn in Rookery Nook (1926)

Stella Bonheur (5 December 1904 – 10 October 1997) was a British actress. She also appeared on stage, e.g. in Rookery Nook, one of the Aldwych farces by Ben Travers.

== Selected filmography ==
- Red Wagon (1933)
- The Elder Brother (1937)
- Behind Your Back (1937)
- Wanted! (1937)
- The End of the Line (1957)
- The Treasure of San Teresa (1959)
- Identity Unknown (1960)
- Compelled (1960)
- The Roman Spring of Mrs. Stone (1961)

== Early life and death ==
Bonheur was born in London on 5 December 1904 and died in London on 10 October 1997, at the age of 92. Sister Angelica in The Treasure of San Teresa (1959), and Mrs. Edwards in The End of the Line (1957). She also appeared in High Tide at Noon (1957), as Aunt Mary, and Man in the Shadow (1957), as a sister at Newhaven.

On television, she appeared in The Errol Flynn Theatre (1956),

== Additional screen credits ==
Among her later film roles, Bonheur played Mrs.Jamison-Walker in The Roman Spring of Mrs. Stone (1961), as Aunt Joan West in The Saint (1962), and as Mrs. White in ITV Playhouse (1967).
