= The Shadow of Mike Emerald =

1936 film

- Leslie Perrins and Marjorie Mars in the film
- Directed by: Maclean Rogers
- Written by: Kathleen Butler; Anthony Richardson
- Produced by: A. George Smith
- Starring: Leslie Perrins; Marjorie Mars; Vincent Holman
- Cinematography: Geoffrey Faithfull
- Production company: George Smith Productions
- Distributed by: RKO Pictures
- Release date: 28 March 1936
- Running time: 61 minutes
- Country: United Kingdom
- Language: English

The Shadow of Mike Emerald is a 1936 British crime drama film directed by Maclean Rogers and starring Leslie Perrins, Marjorie Mars and Vincent Holman. It was written by Kathleen Butler and Anthony Richardson. It was made at the Walton Studios outside London as a quota quickie for release by RKO Pictures.

== Preservation status ==
The British Film Institute National Archive holds a collection of ephemera and stills but no film or video materials.

== Plot ==
Shady financier Mike Emerald double-crosses his criminal associates Lee Cooper, John Elliman and Ryder March. The trio swear revenge once they complete the three-year prison sentence their joint villainy has earned them. On their release, they are frustrated to discover that Emerald has vanished, a setback that only intensifies their relentless hunt for revenge. They find Emerald at a country hotel where he is due to reunite with his wife Lucia, who has been guarding a cache of stolen bearer bonds during his time in jail. Driven by greed, March tries to betray Cooper and Elliman, only to be shot and killed for his treachery. Meanwhile, Emerald arrives at the hotel disguised as an elderly colonel, but he meets his end when he plummets over a balcony during a struggle with Cooper.

== Cast ==
- Leslie Perrins as Mike Emerald
- Marjorie Mars as Lucia Emerald
- Martin Lewis as Lee Cooper
- Vincent Holman as John Ellman
- Atholl Fleming as Clive Warner
- Neville Brook as Ryder March
- Basil Langton as Rollo Graham
- John Counsell
- William Hartnell

== Reception ==
The Monthly Film Bulletin wrote: "It is quite a good film; all the men act extremely well and nearly all the women over act and break down the convincing atmosphere the men have built up. The thrills and comic relief are not always too happily blended: we are often switched suddenly from the main interest to the merely secondary. But the plot is plausible and is aided by the familiarity of the scenes: London streets, flat life, a country inn. The merits far outweigh the defects."

The Daily Film Renter wrote: "Long arm of coincidence plays undue part in development, while sketchy plot and indifferent direction hardly help. Marjorie Mars best of cast comprising able performers who struggle to infuse realism into poorly characterised roles. Quota support for indulgent patrons."

Picture Show wrote: "The story is at times very incredible, and is not too well developed. Leslie Perrins plays the role of Emerald in a manner which hardly convinces and Marjorie Mars as Mrs. Emerald is attractive. Fair entertainment."
