= Twice Branded =

- Directed by: Maclean Rogers
- Written by: Kathleen Butler; H. F. Maltby; Anthony Richardson (novel)
- Produced by: A. George Smith
- Starring: James Mason; Robert Rendel; Lucille Lisle
- Cinematography: Geoffrey Faithfull
- Edited by: Daniel Birt
- Production company: George Smith Productions
- Distributed by: RKO Pictures
- Release date: 11 May 1936
- Running time: 72 minutes
- Country: United Kingdom
- Language: English

Twice Branded is a 1936 British drama film directed by Maclean Rogers and starring James Mason, Robert Rendel and Lucille Lisle. It was made at Walton Studios as a quota quickie.

== Plot ==
A man returning home after serving a prison sentence tries to rebuild his relationship with his family and prevent his son becoming embroiled with the same criminal gang which had led to his own conviction.

== Cast ==
- Robert Rendel as Charles Hamilton
- Lucille Lisle as Betty Hamilton
- James Mason as Henry Hamilton
- Eve Gray as Sylvia Hamilton
- Mickey Brantford as Dennis Hill
- Ethel Griffies as Mrs. Etta Hamilton
- Isobel Scaife as Mary
- Paul Blake as Lord Hugo Winstanley
- Neville Brook as Marcus Leadbetter
- Ethel Royale as Miss Miller
- Wally Patch as James Kaley

== Bibliography ==
- Low, Rachael. Filmmaking in 1930s Britain. George Allen & Unwin, 1985.
- Wood, Linda. British Films, 1927-1939. British Film Institute, 1986.
