= The Treasure of San Teresa =

- Theatrical release poster
- Directed by: Alvin Rakoff
- Written by: Jack Andrews; Jeffrey Dell
- Produced by: John Nasht; Patrick Filmer-Sankey
- Starring: Eddie Constantine; Dawn Addams; Marius Goring; Christopher Lee
- Cinematography: Wilkie Cooper
- Edited by: Jim Connock
- Music by: Don Banks
- Production companies: Beaconsfield Productions; Kurt Ulrich Filmproduktion; Orbit Films
- Distributed by: British Lion; Constantin Film
- Release date: 21 July 1959
- Running time: 84 minutes
- Countries: United Kingdom; West Germany
- Language: English

The Treasure of San Teresa (German: Rhapsodie in Blei) is a 1959 British-West German thriller film directed by Alvin Rakoff and starring Eddie Constantine, Dawn Addams and Marius Goring. It was based on a play by Jeffrey Dell. The film is also known by the alternative titles Hot Money Girl, Long Distance, and Rhapsody in Blei.

== Plot ==
Ex-OSS operative Larry Brennan returns to Czechoslovakia after retiring from his military service during World War II. He is intent on seeking out a hidden cache of Nazi jewels stashed in this country during the war. There he has to join with Hedi von Hartmann, his former lover and a daughter of the German general who previously owned the gems, but Larry is not sure whether he can trust her. Soon Larry begins to realise that he is being double-crossed and triple-crossed.

== Cast ==
- Eddie Constantine as Larry Brennan
- Dawn Addams as Hedi von Hartmann
- Marius Goring as Rudi Siebert
- Christopher Lee as Jaeger
- Nadine Tallier as Zizi
- Walter Gotell as Hamburg inspector
- Willi Witte as von Hartmann
- Leslie "Hutch" Hutchinson as piano player at Billie's
- Gaylord Cavallaro as Mike Jones
- Hubert Mittendorf as Schneider
- Derek Sydney as barman
- Penelope Horner as bar girl
- Georgina Cookson as Billie
- Clive Dunn as cemetery keeper
- Sheldon Lawrence as patrolling policeman
- Steve Plytas as station sergeant
- Thomas Gallagher as truck driver
- Stella Bonheur as Sister Angelica
- Tom Bowman as tough
- Margaret Boyd as Sister Catherine
- Walter Buhler as uniformed policeman
- Tsai Chin as 1st girl in fight
- Marie Devereux as girl with the mink
- Diane Potter as 2nd girl in fight
- Susan Travers as girl at Billie's
- Anna Turner as Billie's maid
