= Tom Helmore =

English actor (1904–1995)

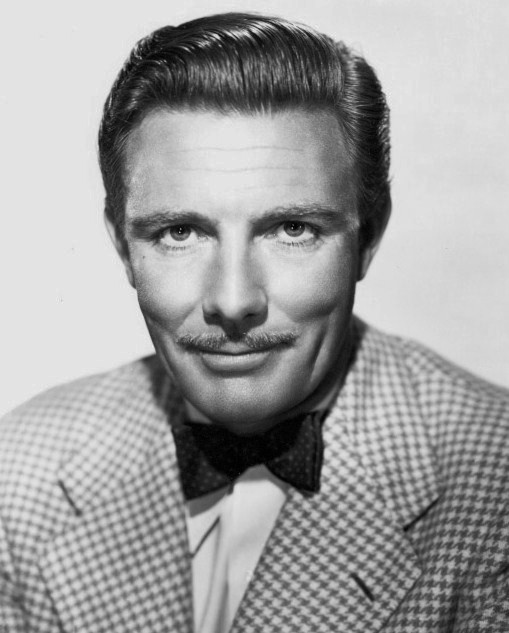
- Born: 4 January 1904; London, England
- Died: 12 September 1995 (aged 91); Longboat Key, Florida, U.S.
- Occupation: Actor
- Years active: 1927–1972
- Spouses: Evelyn Hope (m. 1931; div. 1945) Mary Drayton (m. 1945; died 1994)
- Children: 1

Tom Helmore (4 January 1904 – 12 September 1995) was an English film actor. He appeared in more than 50 films between 1927 and 1972, including three directed by Alfred Hitchcock.

Helmore was born in London, England and died in Longboat Key, Florida, USA. Helmore worked in his father's accounting firm while working as an extra in films. He subsequently pursued acting as a career, working predominantly on the stage, and later on Broadway, which led to Helmore's Hollywood career.

In British and American films, Helmore was mostly employed as a dapper, comedic actor, although he is best known for his role as Gavin Elster, the villain of Alfred Hitchcock’s Vertigo.

Helmore portrayed Colonel X on the Top Secret Files radio program on the Mutual Broadcasting System in the mid-1950s.

== Partial filmography ==
- The Ring (1927) - Spectator (uncredited)
- Young Woodley (1928) - Milner
- White Cargo (1930) - Worthing
- Leave It to Me (1930) - Tony
- The House of Unrest (1931) - David
- The Wife's Family (1931) - Willie Nagg
- The House Opposite (1932) - Minor role (uncredited)
- The Barton Mystery (1932) - Harry Maitland
- Above Rubies (1932) - Paul
- The King's Cup (1933) - Ronnie Helmore
- Up for the Derby (1933) - Ronnie Gordon
- Song at Eventide (1934) - Michael Law
- Virginia's Husband (1934) - Barney Hammond
- The Feathered Serpent (1934) - Peter Dewin
- The Riverside Murder (1935) - Alfred Jerome
- The Right Age to Marry (1935) - Stephen
- Secret Agent (1936) - Colonel Anderson (uncredited)
- Luck of the Turf (1936) - Lord Broadwater
- Treachery on the High Seas (1936) - Edward Brailstone
- Merry Comes to Town (1937) - Peter Bell
- Easy Riches (1938) - Harry Miller
- Paid in Error (1938) - Jimmy Randle
- Shadowed Eyes (1940) - Ian
- Three Daring Daughters (1948) - Michael Pemberton
- Scene of the Crime (1949) - Norrie Lorfield
- Malaya (1949) - Matisson
- Shadow on the Wall (1950) - Crane Weymouth
- Trouble Along the Way (1953) - Harold McCormick
- Let's Do It Again (1953) - Courtney Craig
- The Shadow (1954, TV pilot) - Lamont Cranston / The Shadow
- Lucy Gallant (1955) - Jim Wardman
- The Tender Trap (1955) - Mr. Loughran
- This Could Be the Night (1957) - Stowe Devlin
- Designing Woman (1957) - Zachary Wilde
- Alfred Hitchcock Presents (1958) (Season 3 Episode 39: "Little White Frock") - Adam Longsworth
- Alfred Hitchcock Presents (1958) (Season 4 Episode 9: "Murder Me Twice") - Miles Farnham
- Vertigo (1958) - Gavin Elster
- Count Your Blessings (1959) - Hugh Palgrave
- The Man in the Net (1959) - Gordon Moreland
- The Time Machine (1960) - Anthony Bridewell
- Advise & Consent (1962) - British Ambassador
- Flipper's New Adventure (1964) - Sir Halsey Hopewell
