= All That Glitters (1936 film) =

1936 British film by Maclean Rogers

- Jack Hobbs and Moira Lynd in the film
- Directed by: Maclean Rogers
- Written by: Denison Clift
- Produced by: A. George Smith
- Starring: Jack Hobbs; Moira Lynd; Aubrey Mallalieu; Kay Walsh
- Cinematography: Geoffrey Faithfull
- Production company: George Smith Productions
- Distributed by: RKO
- Release date: December 1936
- Running time: 72 minutes
- Country: United Kingdom
- Language: English

All That Glitters is a 1936 British comedy crime film directed by Maclean Rogers and starring Jack Hobbs, Moira Lynd and Aubrey Mallalieu. It was written by Denison Clift. The film was made at Nettlefold Studios in Walton for distribution as a quota quickie by RKO.

== Preservation status ==
The British Film Institute National Archive holds no stills or ephemera, and no film or video materials.

== Premise ==
A bank manager who has successfully bought into a lucrative gold mine manages to foil the plot of some confidence tricksters who plan to swindle him out of his investment.

== Cast ==
- Jack Hobbs as Jack Tolley
- Moira Lynd as Angela Burrows
- Aubrey Mallalieu as Flint
- Kay Walsh as Eve Payne-Coade
- Annie Esmond as Mrs. Payne-Coade
- Fred Duprez as Mortimer
- John Robinson as Taylor
- Dick Francis as Derek Montague

== Reception ==
The Monthly Film Bulletin wrote: "The story is flimsy and the film is at times slow, but it is amusing and the dialogue is crisp. ... Jack Hobbs as the flippant Tolley is good, and Aubrey Mallalieu gives an excellent performance as Mr. Flint."

Kine Weekly wrote: "Though seldom rising higher than the level of unbelievable farce, the film is taken along at a good pace, and has few dull moments. ... Bright dialogue and amusing surprises."

The Daily Film Renter wrote: "Put over to tune of dialogue rather than action, plot affords several amusing sequences. ... Aubrey Mallalieu walks off with the laurels, his bank manager being a perfect piece of work, particularly when he is 'under the influence'. Jack Hobbs as Tolley, and Moira Lynd as the heroine give conventional renditions in roles that call for little acting ability."
