= His Lordship Regrets =

1938 British film by Maclean Rogers

- Opening titles
- Directed by: Maclean Rogers
- Written by: Kathleen Butler (adaptation); H. F. Maltby (dialogue)
- Based on: the play Bees and Honey by H.F. Maltby
- Produced by: George Smith
- Starring: Claude Hulbert; Winifred Shotter; Gina Malo
- Cinematography: Geoffrey Faithfull
- Music by: W.L. Trytel (uncredited)
- Production company: Canterbury Films
- Distributed by: RKO Pictures (UK)
- Release date: 31 October 1938 (UK)
- Running time: 78 minutes
- Country: United Kingdom
- Language: English
- Budget: £17,974

His Lordship Regrets is a 1938 British comedy film directed by Maclean Rogers and starring Claude Hulbert, Winifred Shotter, Gina Malo and Aubrey Mallalieu. It was written by Kathleen Butler and H. F. Maltby based on the play Bees and Honey by Maltby, and made as a quota quickie.

== Preservation status ==
The British Film Institute National Archive holds a collection of ephemera and stills but no film or video materials.

== Synopsis ==
Impoverished Lord Reggie Cavender pursues wealthy Mabel van Morgan only to discover himself in love with the apparently penniless Mary.

== Cast ==
- Claude Hulbert as Lord Reggie Cavender
- Winifred Shotter as Mary/Mabel
- Gina Malo as Mabel van Morgan
- Aubrey Mallalieu as Dawkins
- Anthony Holles as Guy Reading
- Eve Gray as Enid
- Athole Stewart as Sir Timothy Kentford
- Annie Esmond as Lady Kentford
- Sally Stewart as Sally
- Derek Gorst as Honorable Percy Hartlock
- Gerald Rawlinson as Captain Arthur Gregson

== Reception ==
The Monthly Film Bulletin wrote: "Those who like Claude Hulbert may not find the film too long, but actually it drags a good deal. The settings in the old English country house are pleasant and amusing, but there is hardly enough variety to carry the thing through. The acting and photography are adequate and also the direction, granting the drawback of continual subservience to the star."

Kine Weekly wrote: "Farcical comedy of evergreen design providing a tailor made vehicle for the asinine comicalities of Claude Hulbert. The star, aided by a competent supporting cast and bright dialogue, keeps the laughs at a lively tempo. Production qualities are good. ... There is more dialogue than action, but most of the quips are bright, and these sparkle up conventional comedy situations."

TV Guide called it a "Blah comedy," and went on to conclude that a "Decent cast of familiar British faces doesn't help this one."
