= Nothing Like Publicity =

1936 film

- William Hartnell (left) and Marjorie Taylor in the film
- Directed by: Maclean Rogers
- Written by: Kathleen Butler; H. F. Maltby
- Produced by: A. George Smith
- Starring: William Hartnell; Marjorie Taylor; Moira Lynd
- Cinematography: Geoffrey Faithfull
- Production company: George Smith Productions
- Distributed by: RKO Pictures
- Release date: 1936
- Running time: 64 minutes
- Country: United Kingdom
- Language: English

Nothing Like Publicity is a 1936 British comedy film directed by Maclean Rogers and starring William Hartnell, Marjorie Taylor and Moira Lynd. It was written by Kathleen Butler and H. F. Maltby, and was made at Walton Studios as a quota quickie.

== Preservation status ==
The British Film Institute National Archive holds a collection of ephemera and stills but no film or video materials.

== Plot ==
Ambitious press agent Pat Spencer falls in love with music-hall actress Denise Delorme, whose Dickensian character sketches are failing to excite audiences. Desperate to boost her profile and generate some publicity, Pat persuades Denise to impersonate Miss Bradley, an American heiress travelling to England to claim the famous Wharncliffe diamonds.The publicity stunt initially succeeds, but chaos ensues when a second "Miss Bradley" arrives on the scene. This newcomer is eventually unmasked as an impostor, and Pat and Denise ensures the diamonds remain safe.

== Cast ==
- William Hartnell as Pat Spencer
- Marjorie Taylor as Denise Delorme
- Moira Lynd as Miss Bradley
- Ruby Miller as Sadie Sunshine
- Max Adrian as Bob Wharncliffe
- Isobel Scaife as maid
- Gordon McLeod as Sir Arthur Wharncliffe
- Dorothy Hammond as Lady Wharncliffe
- Aubrey Mallalieu as Mr. Dines
- Rex Alderman as first reporter
- Billy Bray as Billy Merrick
- Neal Arden
- Michael Ripper

== Reception ==
Kine Weekly wrote: "Cheap, but not particularly cheerful, this romantic comedy seldom gives just cause tor laughter. The story, borrowed from old-time stage farce, is weighed down too heavily by chestnuts to get really gong, the acting all too frequently amateurish, the dialogue tame, and the staging cramped. The humour is addressed mainly to unsophisticated, industrial, and family andiences."

The Daily Film Renter wrote: "Somewhat involved narrative errs on side of naivete, but entertainment is forthcoming from amusing performance by Billy Hartnell as perspicacious booster. ... Supporting feature for not too critical patrons."

Picturegoer wrote: "Old-fahioned stage farce, which does not affect the risible faculties to any appreciable extent. The gags and situations are mostly time-honoured and are not redeemed either by the acting of the cast nor the dialogue. ... The staging is rather cramped, and the development is both hackneyed and pedestrian."

Picture Show wrote: "This is an entertaining, unpretentious little British comedy."
