= Dark Secret (film) =

1949 British film by Maclean Rogers

- Australian theatrical release poster
- Directed by: Maclean Rogers
- Screenplay by: Moie Charles; A.R. Rawlinson
- Based on: play The Crime at Blossoms by Mordaunt Shairp
- Produced by: Ernest G. Roy
- Starring: Dinah Sheridan; Emrys Jones; Irene Handl
- Cinematography: Walter J. Harvey
- Edited by: Ted Richards
- Music by: George Melachrino
- Production company: Nettlefold Films
- Distributed by: Butcher's Film Service
- Release date: October 1949
- Running time: 85 minutes
- Country: United Kingdom
- Language: English

Dark Secret is a 1949 British second feature ('B') crime film directed by Maclean Rogers and starring Dinah Sheridan, Emrys Jones and Irene Handl. The screenplay was Moie Charles and A.R. Rawlinson. It was a remake of the 1933 film The Crime at Blossoms, also directed by Rogers.

== Plot ==
Ex-pilot Chris and his wife Valerie move into an attractive country cottage, only to become obsessed with the murdered woman who used to live there before them.

== Cast ==
- Dinah Sheridan as Valerie Merryman
- Emrys Jones as Chris Merryman
- Irene Handl as 'Woody' Woodman
- Hugh Pryse as a very late visitor
- Barbara Couper as Mrs. Barrington
- Percy Marmont as vicar
- Geoffrey Sumner as Jack Farrell
- Mackenzie Ward as artist
- Charles Hawtrey as Arthur Figson
- John Salew as Mr. Barrington
- George Merritt as Mr. Lumley
- Stanley Vilven as Mr. Woodman
- Grace Arnold as housewife
- Esme Beringer as elderly lady
- Edgar Driver as George, barman
- Molly Hamley-Clifford as fat woman
- Laurence Naismith as Mr. Grossmith
- Terry Randall as daughter
- Johnnie Schofield as motor coachman

== Reception ==
The Monthly Film Bulletin wrote: "A wholly inadequate mystery melodrama."

Kine Weekly wrote: Dinah Sheridan is refreshingly feminine, but, delightful as she is personally, she is unable to carry the uneven supporting cast or gloss over the fabulous mumbo-jumbo. ... The picture, which superimposes machine-made macabre on to time-honoured rural comedy, claims to be based on fact, but it is peopled with such stagey characters and burdened with such indifferent dialogue that, in spite of its valid fundamentals, it is much less funny and creepy than the wildest 'who-dunnit.' It could and should have been at least a quarter of an hour shorter."

Picture Show wrote: "This mixture of merriment and the macabre does not altogether come off, and is on the slow-moving side. ... Dinah Sheridan gives an attractive performance as the wife, Emrys Jones makes a cheerfully matter-of-fact husband, and Irene Handl weighs in with the comedy as the charwoman who delights in curdling the blood of the sightseers."
