= The Belles of St. Clements =

1936 British film by Ivar Campbell

- Directed by: Ivar Campbell
- Written by: Terence Rattigan
- Story by: Ivar Campbell; Sheila Campbell
- Produced by: Anthony Havelock-Allan
- Production company: British & Dominions Film Corporation
- Distributed by: Paramount British Pictures
- Release date: January 1936
- Running time: 68 minutes
- Country: United Kingdom
- Language: English

The Belles of St. Clements (also known as The Belles of St. Clement's) is a 1936 British drama film directed by Ivar Campbell and starring Evelyn Foster, Meriel Forbes and Basil Langton. It was written by Terence Rattigan from a story by Campbell and Sheila Campbell, and was made as a quota quickie.

== Plot ==
Schoolgirl Natalie de Mailliere is dismayed to learn her parents have arranged her marriage to Albert de Courcey, an American cousin she has never met. Evading her friend Eve, who had promised her mother to chaperone her, Natalie sneaks out with Billy Grant, a reckless youth who steals a car and flees after a crash. Eve is implicated because Natalie was wearing her beret, but Eve keeps silent to protect Natalie's family. Fortunately, Albert arrives and resolves the crisis.

== Cast ==
- Evelyn Foster as Eve Chester
- Meriel Forbes as Natalie de Mailliere
- Basil Langton as Billy Grant
- Isobel Scaife as Maisie Carstairs
- Enid Lindsey as Miss Nelson
- Sonia Somers as Miss Grant
- Heather White as Betty Green
- Tosca von Bissing as Countess de Mailliere
- Donald Gray as Albert de Courcey
- Arthur Metcalfe as Count de Mailliere
- Frederick Bradshaw as Mr. Garth
- Eileen Munro as Mrs. Carstairs

== Reception ==
Kine Weekly wrote: "Collegiate, romantic drama, presenting a very naive and obvious interpretation of low life in an English girls' high school. Built to the modest intellectual limits of the lower fourth, the picture has mainly to thank its quota ticket for its inclusion in the second feature category. ... There is little fault to find with the female side of the cast. The males, however, are dreadful, they and the director not only kill the simple psychological angle of the story, but reduce the rest to a level closely approximating the kindergarten."

The Daily Film Renter wrote: "Uneventful and novelettish cross-section of life in girls' school, presented with little imagination, and often embarrassingly naive. Poor direction, stilted dialogue, and incredible situations militate against entertainment angles, most of which are supplied by clever portrayal by Meriel Forbes as heroine. ... Quota supporting fare at best, it is difficult to understand why this offering was made. As entertainment it can only please the most uncritical audiences."

Picture Show wrote: "This is a highly imaginary story of melodramatic adventures at a girls' high school. Moderate entertainment."
