= Busman's Holiday (1936 film) =

1936 British film by Maclean Rogers

- Trade advertisement
- Directed by: Maclean Rogers
- Written by: Kathleen Butler; H.F. Maltby; Wally Patch
- Produced by: A. George Smith
- Starring: Wally Patch; Gus McNaughton; Muriel George; H. F. Maltby
- Cinematography: Geoffrey Faithfull
- Production company: George Smith Productions
- Distributed by: RKO Pictures
- Release date: November 1936
- Running time: 68 minutes
- Country: United Kingdom
- Language: English

Busman's Holiday (also known as Bow Bells) is a 1936 British comedy film directed by Maclean Rogers and starring Wally Patch, Gus McNaughton and Muriel George. A bus conductor and his driver manage to round up a gang of criminals. It was made at Nettlefold Studios as a quota quickie for distribution by RKO Pictures.

== Preservation status ==
The British Film Institute National Archive holds a collection of ephemera and stills but no film or video materials.

== Plot ==
Bus driver Alf and conductor Pinky are suspended for their lack of punctuality, and they subsequently find work as house decorators. They inadvertently work on the wrong house, and get involved with burglars who hide their stolen goods in their pockets. They get arrested, but eventually return to the garage none the worse for wear.

== Cast ==
- Wally Patch as Jeff "Pinky" Pinkerton
- Gus McNaughton as Alf Green
- Muriel George as Mrs. Green
- H. F. Maltby as Mr. Bulger
- Isobel Scaife as Daisy
- Robert Hobbs as Harry Blake
- Norman Pierce as crook
- Michael Ripper as crook

== Reception ==
The Monthly Film Bulletin wrote: "The dialogue is crisp and funny, though occasionally it is allowed to slow up the film. But on the whole the film moves quickly and there is a light-hearted spontaneity about it which is refreshing."

Kine Weekly wrote: "The humour is not ultra smart, neither is it original, but in the capable and experienced hands of Wally Patch and Gus McNaughton it nevertheless flows liberally and at good speed. The entertainment should appeal to industrial and provincial audiences."

The Daily Film Renter wrote: "Put over with plenty of slapstick deriving from co-stars' misadventures as amateur house decorators, subject has lashings of broad comedy, and affords good 'down to earth' humors of human type. Robust supporting feature for the masses."
