= Deadlock (1943 film) =

1943 British film by Ronald Haines

- Directed by: Ronald Haines
- Produced by: Ronald Haines
- Starring: John Slater; Cecile Chevreau; Molly Hamley-Clifford; Hugh Morton
- Production company: British Foundation Pictures Ltd
- Release date: October 1943
- Running time: 59 minutes
- Country: United Kingdom
- Language: English

Deadlock is a 1943 British crime film directed by Robert Haines and starring John Slater in a dual role as twin brothers. A quota quickie, it was listed on the British Film Institute's BFI 75 Most Wanted list of lost films and was subsequently rediscovered.

== Cast ==
- John Slater as Fred Bamber / Allan Bamber
- Cecile Chevreau as Eileen
- Molly Hamley-Clifford as Martha
- Hugh Morton as Arkell
- Gordon Edwards as Geoffrey
- Mirren Wood as a village girl
- Richard Lindsay as the judge
- George Dewhurst as Slaks

== Reception ==
The Monthly Film Bulletin wrote: "John Slater makes the twin brothers suitably unattractive, and Cecille Chevreau does her best with the unfortunate Eileen. Direction and dialogue are uninspired and the cast fail to evoke much sympathy, so that it is not a matter of great interest whether they are hanged or murdered."

Kine Weekly wrote: "There is more to the plot than meets the eye, but unfortunately neither the script-writers, cast nor director make the most of its psychological possibilities. Still, much of its surface action is suspenseful and exciting, and its climax exploits a well-timed twist. It's an each-way bet on balance. Reliable quota proposition for the smaller industrial halls."
