= The End of the Line (1957 film) =

British crime film by Charles Saunders

- U.S.A. poster
- Directed by: Charles Saunders
- Screenplay by: Paul Erickson
- Story by: Paul Erickson
- Produced by: Guido Coen
- Starring: Alan Baxter; Barbara Shelley; Arthur Gomez; Jennifer Jayne
- Cinematography: Walter J. Harvey
- Edited by: Tom Simpson
- Music by: Edwin Astley
- Production company: A Fortress Film Production
- Distributed by: Eros Films (UK); Jerome Balsam Films Inc.(USA)
- Release dates: December 1957 (UK); 1959 (US)
- Country: United Kingdom
- Language: English

The End of the Line is a 1957 British second feature crime film directed by Charles Saunders and starring Alan Baxter, Barbara Shelley, Ferdy Mayne and Jennifer Jayne. The screenplay was by Paul Erickson. It was released in the US in 1959.

== Plot ==
Mike Selby, an American author living in England gets involved with the wife of a jewel fence, who persuades Mike to rob her husband, whilst at the same time giving him a fake alibi. But soon after the robbery when the jewel fence winds up dead, Mike begins to get blackmailed.

== Cast ==
- Alan Baxter as Mike Selby
- Barbara Shelley as Liliane Crawford
- Ferdy Mayne as Edwards
- Jennifer Jayne as Anne Bruce
- Arthur Gomez as John Crawford
- Geoffrey Hibbert as Max Perrin
- Jack Melford as Inspector Gates
- Charles Clay as Henry Bruce
- Marianne Brauns as Sally
- Sheldon Allan as barman
- Harry Towb as Vince
- Barbara Cochran as Cynthia
- Colin Rix as Detective Parker
- Stella Bonheur as Mrs. Edwards
- Charles Cameron as publican

== Production ==
It was made at Southall Studios, now in Greater London.

== Critical reception ==
The Monthly Film Bulletin wrote: "A routine crime story with a highly unconvincing plot which relies heavily on coincidence, this film sticks carefully to stereotyped lines. The acting throughout is remarkably poor."

Kine Weekly wrote: "The plot's a trifle theatrical, but competent stellar performances and resourceful direction enable it to hold the interest. There is no lack of movement, and it culminates on a hectic note. ... The picture presents a new if slightly extravagant variation of the 'perfect alibi' theme, and even though it lets its hero off lightly at the finish, gives it conviction. Alan Baxter registers as Mike, Barbara Shelley makes an attractive bad hat as Liliane, and Arthur Gomez, Jennifer Jayne and Ferdy Mayne score in direct support. Its settings are appropriate, and music is logically introduced. Definitely a shrewdly carpentered job."

In British Sound Films: The Studio Years 1928–1959 David Quinlan rated the film as "mediocre", writing: "Very far-fetched, stickily acted thriller."
