= Martin Lewis (English actor) =

British actor (1888–1970)

- 1939 Spotlight casting directory photo
- Born: 8 September 1888; Blackheath, Kent, England
- Died: 1 April 1970 (aged 81); Farnborough Common, Orpington, Kent, England
- Occupation: Actor

Martin Lewis (8 September 1888 – 1 April 1970) was an English actor. He has appeared in various films and shows including The Stronger Sex, The Riverside Murder, The Heirloom Mystery and the series Emergency-Ward 10. On stage, he played Dr. Bradman in the original West End production of Noël Coward's Blithe Spirit in 1941.

== Selected filmography ==
- Greek Street (1930)
- The Stronger Sex (1931)
- Dangerous Ground (1934)
- The Heirloom Mystery (1936)
- The Shadow of Mike Emerald (1936)
