= Miracles Do Happen =

1938 British film by Maclean Rogers

- Trade advertisement (Kine Weekly, 23 May 1940)
- Directed by: Maclean Rogers
- Written by: Kathleen Butler; H. F. Maltby; Jack Marks; Con West
- Produced by: George Smith
- Starring: Aubrey Mallalieu; Jack Hobbs; Bruce Seton; Marjorie Taylor
- Cinematography: Geoffrey Faithfull
- Edited by: Daniel Birt
- Production company: George Smith Productions
- Distributed by: New Realm Pictures
- Release date: 1940
- Running time: 59 minutes
- Country: United Kingdom
- Language: English

Miracles Do Happen is a 1940 British comedy film directed by Maclean Rogers and starring Aubrey Mallalieu, Jack Hobbs, Bruce Seton and Marjorie Taylor. It was written by Kathleen Butler, H. F. Maltby, Jack Marks and Con West, and made at Isleworth Studios as a quota quickie.

== Preservation status ==
The British Film Institute National Archive holds the film.

== Plot ==
Professor Gilmore discovers a formula for making synthetic milk, and sets out to manufacture and market the product. Farcial adventures ensue when Gilmore and his associates raise the necessary funding, but then realise they have lost the formula.

== Cast ==
- Aubrey Mallalieu as Professor Gilmore
- Jack Hobbs as Barry Strangeways
- Bruce Seton as Rodney Gilmore
- Marjorie Taylor as Peggy Manning
- George Carney as Mr. F. Greenlaw
- Molly Hamley-Clifford as Mrs. Greenlaw
- Anthony Holles as Proctor
- Douglas Stewart
- Derek Farr as Greenlaw's secretary
- Andreas Malandrinos as headwaiter
- Michael Ripper as Morning Comet reporter

== Reception ==
The Monthly Film Bulletin wrote: "This is an amusing, cheerful film with an entirely fantastic plot. Aubrey Mallalieu is good as the inventor and the rest of the cast support him nobly."

Kine Weekly wrote: "The picture's aim is to make good, wholesome fun, aud as such it is commendably successful. The story keeps moving all the time, and amusing situations are continuous."

The Daily Film Renter wrote: "Story amusingly put together, moving smoothly, supported by snappy and amusing dialogue. Slight romantic interest, sound portrayals by leading players. Modest picture, competently made, offering worthwhile support for most situations."
