= The Elder Brother (film) =

- Directed by: Frederick Hayward
- Written by: Anthony Gibbs (novel); Dorothy Greenhill
- Produced by: George King
- Starring: John Stuart; Marjorie Taylor; Basil Langton; Charlotte Tedlie; Stella Bonheur
- Cinematography: Jack Parker
- Production company: George King Productions
- Distributed by: Paramount Pictures
- Release date: February 1937
- Running time: 67 minutes
- Country: United Kingdom
- Language: English

The Elder Brother is a 1937 British drama film directed by Frederick Hayward and starring John Stuart, Marjorie Taylor and Basil Langton. It was made at Shepperton Studios as a quota quickie for release by the Hollywood studio Paramount Pictures.

== Cast ==
- John Stuart as Ronald Bellairs
- Marjorie Taylor as Susan Woodward
- Basil Langton as Hugo Bellairs
- Stella Bonheur as Lady Hobbs
- Hilary Pritchard as Sir Frederick Hobbs
- Claude Horton as Doctor

== Bibliography ==
- Chibnall, Steve. Quota Quickies: The British of the British 'B' Film. British Film Institute, 2007.
- Low, Rachael. Filmmaking in 1930s Britain. George Allen & Unwin, 1985.
- Wood, Linda. British Films, 1927-1939. British Film Institute, 1986.
