= Isobel Scaife =

British actress (1911–1985)

- Born: 27 June 1911; Portsmouth, Hampshire, United Kingdom
- Died: 14 December 1985 (aged 74); Turnworth, Dorset, United Kingdom
- Occupation: Actress
- Years active: 1935–1938 (film)

Isobel Scaife (1911–1985) was a British stage and film actress. She received a diploma in acting from the Royal Academy of Dramatic Art in 1931.

== Selected filmography ==
- Old Faithful (1935)
- The Right Age to Marry (1935)
- Nothing Like Publicity (1936)
- Not So Dusty (1936)
- Busman's Holiday (1936)
- The Belles of St. Clements (1936)
- Twice Branded (1936)
- Nothing Like Publicity (1936)
- Pearls Bring Tears (1937)
- Why Pick on Me? (1937)
- Strange Adventures of Mr. Smith (1937)
- Silver Top (1938)
