= George Carney =

British actor (1887–1947)

- Born: 21 November 1887; Bristol, Gloucestershire, England
- Died: 9 December 1947 (aged 60); London, England
- Occupations: Comedian, actor

George Carney (21 November 1887 – 9 December 1947) was a British comedian and film actor.

Born in Bristol, he worked at the Liverpool Cotton Exchange, in a furniture business, then in the Belfast shipyards. In 1906 he made his debut stage appearance in a pantomime in Nottingham, with his first London appearance following in 1907, as one half of a double act, Carney and Armstrong. They toured together in Britain, Australia and South Africa before Carney set up revues with another comedian, Sam Harris. From 1926, he worked on stage as a solo comedian, with such sketches as "The Fool of the Force", "The Stage Door Keeper", and "I Live in Leicester Square". He then took up a film career, appearing as a character actor in numerous British films, including Love on the Dole (1941) and Brighton Rock (1948).

He was the uncle of actor Leonard Williams

He died in London in 1947.

== Complete filmography ==
- Commissionaire (1933) - Sergeant Ted Seymour
- The Television Follies (1933) - Father
- Say It with Flowers (1934) - Bill Woods
- The Night Club Queen (1934) - Hale
- Red Ensign (1934) - Mr. Lindsey (uncredited)
- Music Hall (1934) - Bill
- Easy Money (1934) - Boggie
- A Glimpse of Paradise (1934) - Jim Bogsworth
- Hyde Park (1934) - Joe Smith
- Flood Tide (1934) - Captain Bill Buckett
- Lest We Forget (1934) - Sergeant Jock
- A Real Bloke (1935) - Bill
- City of Beautiful Nonsense (1935) - Chesterton
- Windfall (1935) - Syd
- Cock o' the North (1935) - George Barton
- Variety (1935) - Minor Role
- The Small Man (1936) - Bill Edwards
- It's in the Bag (1936) - Blumfield
- Tomorrow We Live (1936) - Mr. Taylor
- Land Without Music (1936) - Prison Warder
- Some Waiter! (1936 short)
- Thunder in the City (1937) - Harry Hopper (uncredited)
- Dreaming Lips (1937) - Rescuer
- Beauty and the Barge (1937) - Tom Codd
- Father Steps Out (1937) - Joe Hardcastle
- Smash and Grab (1937) - Engine Driver (uncredited)
- Lancashire Luck (1937) - George Lovejoy
- Little Miss Somebody (1937) - Angus Duncan
- Easy Riches (1938) - Sam Miller
- Paid in Error (1938) - Will Baker
- Kicking the Moon Around (1938) - Police Constable Truscott
- Weddings Are Wonderful (1938) - Rogers
- When We Are Married (1938 TV movie) - Henry Ormonroyd
- Consider Your Verdict (1938 short) - The Butcher
- Miracles Do Happen (1938) - Mr. F. Greenlaw
- Young Man's Fancy (1939) - Chairman
- Come On George! (1939) - Sgt. Johnson
- Where's That Fire? (1940) - Councillor (uncredited)
- The Stars Look Down (1940) - Slogger Gowlan
- A Window in London (1940) - Night Watchman
- Convoy (1940) - Bates
- The Briggs Family (1940) - George Downing
- Kipps (1941) - Old Pornick (scenes deleted)
- Love on the Dole (1941) - Mr. Hardcastle
- The Common Touch (1941) - Charlie
- Hard Steel (1942) - Bert Mortimer
- The Day Will Dawn (1942) - Harry, Soldier in Fleet Street Pub
- Unpublished Story (1942) - Landlord
- In Which We Serve (1942) - Mr. Blake
- Thunder Rock (1942) - Harry
- Rose of Tralee (1942) - Collett
- When We Are Married (1943) - Landlord
- Schweik's New Adventures (1943) - Gendarme
- The Night Invader (1943) - Conductor
- Tawny Pipit (1944) - Whimbrel
- Welcome, Mr. Washington (1944) - Publican
- Soldier, Sailor (1944)
- Waterloo Road (1945) - Tom Mason
- The Agitator (1945) - Bill Shackleton
- I Know Where I'm Going! (1945) - Mr. Webster
- Wanted for Murder (1946) - Boat Rental Agent
- Spring Song (1946) - Stage Door Keeper (uncredited)
- The Root of All Evil (1947) - Bowser
- Woman to Woman (1947) - Taxi Driver
- The Little Ballerina (1947) - Bill
- Fortune Lane (1947) - Mr. Quentin
- Brighton Rock (1948) - Phil Corkery
- Good-Time Girl (1948) - Mr. Rawlings
