= Reginald Hopwood =

Personal information
- Full name: Reginald Arthur Hopwood
- Born: 5 July 1903; Marylebone, London, England
- Died: 3 June 1969 (aged 65); Tangier, Morocco
- Nickname: Binks
- Batting: Unknown
- Bowling: Unknown arm fast-medium

Domestic team information
- Years: Team
- 1924: Gloucestershire

Career statistics
Competition	First-class
Matches	1
Runs scored	2
Batting average	1.00
100s/50s	–/–
Top score	2
Balls bowled	18
Wickets	–
Bowling average	–
5 wickets in innings	–
10 wickets in match	–
Best bowling	–
Catches/stumpings	–/–
- Source: Cricinfo, 8 July 2012

Reginald Arthur Hopwood (5 July 1903 – 3 June 1969) was a diplomat, film-maker and an English cricketer. Hopwood's batting style is unknown, but it is known he was a fast-medium bowler, although it is not known which arm he bowled with. He was born at Marylebone, London.

Hopwood made a single first-class appearance for Gloucestershire against Derbyshire in the 1924 County Championship at the County Ground, Derby. Gloucestershire won the toss and elected to bat, making 92 all out. Hopwood, who batted at number eleven, was dismissed for a duck by Samuel Cadman. In response, Derbyshire made just 87 all out, during which Hopwood bowled three wicketless overs. Replying in their second-innings, Gloucestershire were made 161 all out, with Hopwood scoring 2 runs before he was dismissed by Arthur Morton. Set 167 for victory, Derbyshire were dismissed for 157 in their second-innings, losing by 9 runs. This was his only major appearance for Gloucestershire. Later in League Cricket he appeared for Affiliate making 2, 1, 11, 3, 6 in his first three matches.

He married Rosemary Storey in 1926, and in the 1930s became a producer and director of films, usually shorts using the Windmill Theatre performers, such as Bottle party (1936), Digging for gold (1936), Full stream (1936), Windmill revels (1937), Carry On London (1937), Up town review (1937), Concert party (1937), Two men in a box (1938), Swing (1938), etc.

In 1939 he went to Tangier, where he took up the position of attaché to the British Consulate General.

He died at Tangier in Morocco on 3 June 1969.
