= East of Ludgate Hill =

1937 British film by Manning Haynes

- Dorothy Dewhurst, Hal Gordon, Eliot Makeham and Nancy O'Neil in the film
- Directed by: Manning Haynes
- Written by: Edward Dryhurst; Arnold Ridley
- Starring: Hal Gordon; Aubrey Mallalieu; Nancy O'Neil
- Cinematography: Stanley Grant
- Production company: Fox Film Company
- Distributed by: Fox Film Company
- Release date: December 1937
- Running time: 48 minutes
- Country: United Kingdom
- Language: English

East of Ludgate Hill is a 1937 British drama film directed by Manning Haynes and starring Hal Gordon, Aubrey Mallalieu and Nancy O'Neil. It was written by Edward Dryhurst and Arnold Ridley, and was made as a quota quickie at Wembley Studios by the British subsidiary of 20th Century Fox.

== Plot ==
After a successful trading year, James MacIntyre, the head of a firm of stockbrokers, promises a bonus of £50 to each of his senior employees, but their expectations are dashed when there is talk that the company has been robbed by Maclntyre’s good-for-nothing son.

== Cast ==
- Hal Gordon as Bert Bickley
- Aubrey Mallalieu as James MacIntyre
- Robert Cochran as Derek Holt
- Dorothy Dewhurst as Miss Parfitt
- Nancy O'Neil as Norah Applin
- Eliot Makeham as Mr Tallweather

== Reception ==
The Monthly Film Bulletin wrote: "The acting is good, though occasionally overdone in an effort to stress a type, and the film is well cast. Occasionally a stilted note appears in the dialogue and the direction is slow, but this detracts little from the placid interest of the film."

Kine Weekly wrote: "Original financial comedy-drama, revealing in its treatment both directorial and technical initiative. ... Robert Cochran and Nancy O'Neil are the stars, but they have little to do other than supply conventional romance. Eliot Makeham, Hal Gordon, Aubrey Mallalicu and Dorothy Dewhurst are the main contenders for acting honours, and their good work is, incidentally, the backbone ot the entertainment."

Picture Show wrote: "Unusual little drama ... It is convincingly acted, neatly directed, with humour and romance lightening the drama."
