= Strange Adventures of Mr. Smith =

- Gus McNaughton, Eve Gray and Isobel Scaife in the film
- Directed by: Maclean Rogers
- Written by: Kathleen Butler; H. F. Maltby; Gus McNaughton
- Produced by: A. George Smith
- Starring: Gus McNaughton; Norma Varden; Eve Gray
- Cinematography: Geoffrey Faithfull
- Production company: George Smith Productions
- Distributed by: RKO Pictures
- Release date: 11 October 1937
- Country: United Kingdom
- Language: English

Strange Adventures of Mr. Smith is a 1937 British comedy film directed by Maclean Rogers and starring Gus McNaughton, Norma Varden and Eve Gray. It was written by Kathleen Butler, H. F. Maltby and Gus McNaughton, and was a quota quickie made at Nettlefold Studios in Walton for release by RKO Pictures.

== Plot ==
Pavement artist Will Smith works in disguise, known as "Black Patch", keeping his job secret from his wife Marjorie for fear of disapproval by her snobbish family, the Broadbents. Urged by her mother, Marjorie demands to know his line of work. When he refuses, the pair tail him, catching him in his disguise. Thinking Black Patch is actually William's murderer, they raise the alarm, sending police and shop assistants in hot pursuit. Cleverly shedding his alter ego, Will secures a £10,000 legacy left to Black Patch by a grateful patron. After standing up to Mrs Broadbent, he looks forward to a peaceful, prosperous marriage.

== Cast ==
- Gus McNaughton as Will Smith / Black Patch
- Norma Varden as Mrs. Broadbent
- Eve Gray as Mrs. Marjorie Smith
- Aubrey Mallalieu as Mr. Broadbent
- Bill Shine as Rodney Broadbent
- Hal Walters as Lobby
- Isobel Scaife as Birkenstraw
- Michael Ripper as extra
- John Singer as boy

== Reception ==
The Monthly Film Bulletin wrote: "Farcical comedy. The story is amusing, the episodes well-chosen, the dialogue interesting and the direction smooth. The minor characters, such as Black Patch's fellow pedlar, a seller of balloons, goldfish and maps of London, and Smith's maid well support the major characters and add to the fun of the film. The acting is good."

Kine Weekly wrote: "The treatment of H. F. Maltby's story is resourceful and the characterisations are fairly good, but the comedy for the most part is only mildly amusing. ... Gus McNaughton is in good form in the dual impersonations of a typical suburbanite and pavement artist, and is responsible for most of the laughs. Norma Varden is the characteristically domineering mother-in-law, and Eve Gray is the pretty but rather dumb wife, Marjorie."

Picturegoer wrote: "Most of the laughs in this farce are raised by the hard work of the star, Gus McNaughton, in a dual role. The plot has some originality of idea, but it never avoids .the obvious and drifts from one situation to another rather than building up to a climax."
