= Jack Hobbs (actor) =

British actor (1893–1968)

- Born: 28 September 1893; London; United Kingdom
- Died: 4 June 1968 (aged 74); Brighton, East Sussex; United Kingdom
- Occupation: Actor
- Years active: 1915–1940 (film)

Jack Hobbs (28 September 1893 – 4 June 1968) was a British stage and film actor who appeared in more than forty films. After making his debut in the 1915 silent The Yoke Hobbs appeared in a mixture of leading and supporting roles in both the silent and sound eras. He played the hero in several quota quickies of the 1930s, including All That Glitters (1936). He was cast as an effectively glib, smooth-talking antagonist in two George Formby films No Limit (1935) and It's in the Air (1938).

His West End appearances included The Dancers (1923), Betty in Mayfair (1925) and Admirals All (1934).

== Filmography ==
- The Yoke (1915)
- Tom Brown's Schooldays (1916)
- The Lady Clare (1919)
- The Face at the Window (1920)
- The Shuttle of Life (1920)
- Inheritance (1920)
- The Call of Youth (1921)
- The Skin Game (1921)
- The Lonely Lady of Grosvenor Square (1922)
- The Crimson Circle (1922)
- The Eleventh Commandment (1924)
- The Happy Ending (1925)
- The Flame (1926)
- Mischief (1931)
- Love Lies (1931)
- The Love Race (1931)
- Doctor Josser K.C. (1931)
- Never Trouble Trouble (1931)
- The Last Coupon (1932)
- Josser Joins the Navy (1932)
- Josser in the Army (1932)
- His Wife's Mother (1932)
- Too Many Wives (1933)
- Beware of Women (1933)
- Double Wedding (1933)
- Trouble in Store (1934)
- Oh No Doctor! (1934)
- No Limit (1935)
- Handle with Care (1935)
- Car of Dreams (1935)
- The Interrupted Honeymoon (1936)
- All That Glitters (1936)
- The Show Goes On (1937)
- Fine Feathers (1937)
- Millions (1937)
- Why Pick on Me? (1937)
- Intimate Relations (1937)
- When the Devil Was Well (1937)
- Leave It to Me (1937)
- Miracles Do Happen (1938)
- It's in the Air (1938)
- Make It Three (1938)
- Let George Do It! (1940)

== Bibliography ==
- Chibnall, Steve. Quota Quickies: The British of the British 'B' Film. British Film Institute, 2007.
- Low, Rachael. Filmmaking in 1930s Britain. George Allen & Unwin, 1985.
