= Facing the Music (1941 film) =

1941 film

- Directed by: Maclean Rogers
- Written by: Kathleen Butler; Maclean Rogers
- Produced by: Maclean Rogers
- Starring: Bunny Doyle; Betty Driver; Chili Bouchier; H. F. Maltby
- Cinematography: Stephen Dade
- Music by: Percival Mackey
- Production company: Butcher's Film Service
- Distributed by: Butcher's Film Service
- Release date: 25 August 1941
- Running time: 79 minutes
- Country: United Kingdom
- Language: English

Facing the Music is a 1941 British comedy film directed by Maclean Rogers and starring Bunny Doyle, Betty Driver, Chili Bouchier and H. F. Maltby. It was written by Kathleen Butler and Rogers. The film's sets were designed by the art director R. Holmes Paul.

== Preservation status ==
The British Film Institute National Archive holds a collection of ephemera and stills but no film or video materials.

== Plot ==
Wilfred Hollibone is an incompetent who struggles to hold down a job. His one ambition is to be able to sing a popular song he has composed; but nobody will listen to him. His girl, Mary Matthews, gets him a series of jobs in the various departments of the munitions factory where she works, but the useless Hollibone gets sacked from them all. To confuse spies, false information is leaked that vital machinery is being constructed in a vacant garage, with Hollibone managing the project. The spies are lured and steal the useless plans. Hollibone helps to arrest them, and finally gets a chance to sing his song at a factory concert.

== Cast ==
- Bunny Doyle as Wilfred Hollibone
- Betty Driver as Mary Matthews
- H. F. Maltby as Mr. Bulger
- Chili Bouchier as Anna Braun
- Wally Patch as Briggs
- Gus McNaughton as illusionist
- Ruby Miller as Gloria Lynn
- Eliot Makeham as secretary
- Gordon McLeod as Mr. Kelly

== Reception ==
The Monthly Film Bulletin wrote: "A quite amusing comedy of its kind. Bunny Doyle as the nit-wit hero is the undisguised music hall comedian. ... The direction lacks that speed and sureness which is necessary in a film of this kind if one is not to be allowed leisure to dwell on its improbabiities."

Kine Weekly wrote: "Bunny Doyle, already familiar to music-hall and wireless audiences, reveals an appealing personality and an aptitude for verbal and physical slapstick as the simple hero, Wilfred Hollibone; he is ably supported by Betty Driver, who sings delightfully and acts with conviction as his sweetheart Mary. ... Hearty farcical action, pleasant star personality, attractive musical numbers, topical setting and enthusiastic teamwork."
