= Wanted! =

- Trade advertisement
- Directed by: George King
- Written by: H. F. Maltby; Brock Williams (play)
- Produced by: George King
- Starring: Zasu Pitts; Claude Dampier; Mark Daly
- Cinematography: Jack Parker
- Music by: Colin Wark
- Production company: Embassy Pictures
- Distributed by: Sound City Films
- Release date: 17 February 1937
- Running time: 69 minutes
- Country: United Kingdom
- Language: English

Wanted! is a 1937 British comedy film directed by George King and starring Zasu Pitts, Claude Dampier and Mark Daly. It was written by H. F. Maltby from the play by Brock Williams, and was made at Shepperton Studios as a quota quickie.

== Preservation status ==
The British Film Institute National Archive holds a collection of ephemera and stills but no film or video materials.

== Premise ==
The Oatfields, a married couple, are mistaken for jewel thieves and forced to go to a party. The husband accidentally turns on the burglar alarm and the real criminals are apprehended.

== Cast ==
- Zasu Pitts as Winnie Oatfield
- Claude Dampier as Henry Oatfield
- Mark Daly as Mr. Smithers
- Norma Varden as Mrs. Smithers
- Finlay Currie as Uncle Mart
- Kathleen Harrison as Belinda
- Billy Holland as Harry the Hick
- Stella Bonheur as Baby Face
- Billy Bray as Sparrow Hawkins
- Arthur Goullet as Bonelli
- Alfred Wellesley as Lord Hotbury
- Mabel Twemlow as Lady Hotbury
- D.J. Williams as Captain McTurk
- Bryan Herbert as Police Constable Gribble

== Reception ==
The Monthly Film Bulletin wrote: "A good slick production. The East End scenes in a fog are particularly well photographed. Claude Dampier and Zasu Re both have parts which suit them completely, and both make the most of them."

Kine Weekly wrote: "Amusing comedy crime melodrama ... Zasu Pitts and Claude Dampier, inimitable exponents of humorous timidity, team up successtully, but they get very little support from the story, and not much from the director. There is little contrast to their fooling apart from a few commonplace crime burlesque sequences, hence a certain flatness and sketchiness of the entertainment. ... Lacking in pep, snap and contrast, the film is little more than a conventional, mildly amusing domestic playlet with half-hearted gangster trimmings."

The Daily Film Renter wrote: "Main entertainment springs from teaming of Zasu Pitts and Claude Dampier, who manage to extract laughs from not overbright material, and project characteristic personalities through familiar narrative morass concerning inevitable jewel robbery. ... Having taken the trouble to bring Zastu Pitts all the way from Hollywood, it is rather a pity the sponsors of this production could not have provided her with something more worthwhile in the way of story material."
