= Basil Langton =

English actor (1912–2003)

Langton in the 1960s

Basil Cedric Langton (9 January 1912 – 29 May 2003) was an English actor, director and photographer, who made a career on both sides of the Atlantic. He was an authority on the plays of George Bernard Shaw and compiled an archive of more than 400,000 words of interviews with people who had known and worked with Shaw. He was also a teacher, working at colleges in New York and California.

== Life and career ==
Langton was born 9 January 1912 in Clifton, Bristol (England) but spent his early years in Canada, where his family moved soon after his birth. His first experience of theatre was in Montreal, where, at the age of six, he was taken by his mother to see Sarah Bernhardt's farewell tour in Camille. During his youth in Canada he became attracted by silent films: "I learned courage from Pearl White, love from Rudolph Valentino, and laughter from Charlie Chaplin". After leaving school he worked in a bank in Vancouver, British Columbia, and acted in plays staged by the city's Little Theatre Association. He had beeninspired to become an actor by seeing Sir Donald Wolfit's performance in The Barretts of Wimpole Street in 1932. He won a scholarship to the arts school at Dartington Hall in Devon that enabled him to leave Canada and return to England to begin a stage career in 1934. In 1935 he began learning classical acting at the Shakespeare Memorial Theatre and the Old Vic.

Langton appeared in fifteen films between 1935 and 1949, including The Belles of St. Clements (1936), One Good Turn (1936), The Shadow of Mike Emerald (1936), Father Steps Out (1937), The Elder Brother (1937), Mr. Smith Carries On (1937) and Merry Comes to Town (1937).

In Laurence Olivier's first Macbeth at the Old Vic, Langton "took the eye with an extremely subtle and suspicious little characterisation of Lennox in the murder scene"; he understudied the star in the title role.

In 1936, he was cast as Dolabella in Theodore Komisarjevsky's staging of Antony and Cleopatra. In the same year he played Eliah opposite the exiled German star Elisabeth Bergner in the title role in Sir J. M. Barrie's The Boy David.

In 1938 he played the lead in the London premiere of Clifford Odets's Awake and Sing, and for Michel Saint-Denis he appeared in Mikhail Bulgakov's The White Guard with Michael Redgrave and Peggy Ashcroft in 1938. He played Sebastian to Ashcroft's Viola in Twelfth Night in the same season. At Stratford in 1940, Langton played Hamlet with what The Times called "a fine Italianate presence", and was praised for his "tight lipped and tortured passion" as Angelo in Measure for Measure.

After a series of leading roles with the Birmingham Repertory Theatre, Langton founded his own permanent repertory ensemble, the Travelling Repertory Company, in 1941. It toured Britain until 1946, performing in bombed cities, munitions factories and army camps. At various times the company's members included Dame Sybil Thorndike and Sir Lewis Casson (who were married to each other), as well as Margaret Leighton, Renée Asherson. Esmond Knight, Paul Scofield and Eric Porter.

Langton was declared medically unfit for military service in World War II because he had asthma, but nonetheless registered as a conscientious objector. His wartime pacifism estranged him from some in the British establishment; it was widely believed that his pacifist beliefs had led the authorities to withhold the public subsidy a touring repertory company might have been expected to receive.

In 1947, Langton moved permanently to the U.S., and worked on stage and television as a director and actor. He gave the American television premiere of a Shaw play, The Devil's Disciple, and produced the first Shaw Festival in America. He was a co-founder of the Empire State Music Festival, and ran a jazz festival with Duke Ellington, Dave Brubeck and George Shearing. On Broadway he acted in The Affair, Camelot and Rolf Hochhuth's controversial play Soldiers. He returned to London in as the Chief of the Imperial General Staff, Lord Alanbrooke, in Clifford Williams's production of Soldiers at the New Theatre in 1968. One of his last acting performances was in Star Trek: Voyager in 1994 as the titular character, an extra-terrestrial being, in the two-hour pilot episode "Caretaker".

In addition to his acting, Langton taught at the Manhattan School of Music, at UCLA, and at Sarah Lawrence College. He was an authority on the stage works of Shaw, and in 1959 he was awarded a Guggenheim Fellowship to research the playwright's stagecraft. The resulting interviews with more than sixty people who had known and worked with Shaw were recorded on tape and transcribed. The recordings and transcripts, amounting to more than 400,000 words, were acquired by the Humanities Research Center of the University of Texas Library in Austin.

Langton was also an exhibited photographer. His pictures of Henry Moore, David Hockney, Joan Miró and others have been displayed at the Metropolitan Museum of Art in New York.

Langton's first marriage was to the dancer Louise Soelberg, with whom he had a daughter; the second was to the actress Nancy Wickwire. Both marriages ended in divorce. He was survived by his daughter and his long-term companion, Judith Searle. He died in Santa Monica, California, aged 91.

== Notes and sources ==
=== Sources ===
- Croall, Jonathan (2008). Sybil Thorndike: A Star of Life. London: Haus. ISBN 978-1-905791-92-7.
