= Eve Gray =

English actress (1900–1983)

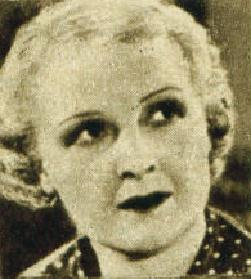
- Gray in 1938
- Born: Fanny Evelyn Garrett; 27 November 1900; West Bromwich, Staffordshire, England
- Died: 23 May 1983 (aged 82); Mere, Wiltshire, England
- Other name: Eve Grey
- Occupation: Film actress
- Years active: 1927–1951

Eve Gray (27 November 1900 – 23 May 1983) was an English film actress.

Born Fanny Evelyn Garrett, she was taken to Australia as a child and later had a stage career there. She returned to England in 1924 and within three days of arrival had signed a contract and then made her first appearance on the London stage at Daly's Theatre in Madame Pompadour. A film contract soon followed, although she continued to appear on stage in the West End in plays such as Charles Bennett's Sensation.

== Partial filmography ==
- The Lodger: A Story of the London Fog (1927) - Showgirl Victim (uncredited)
- The Silver Lining (1927) - Lettie Deans
- Poppies of Flanders (1927) - Beryl Kingwood
- One of the Best (1927) - Mary Penrose
- The Lodger (1927)
- Moulin Rouge (1928) - Margaret
- Villa Falconieri (1928) - Princess Sora
- Smashing Through (1929) - Kitty Masters
- Sweet Pepper (1929)
- The Secret Adversary (1929) - Lucienne Fereoni
- The Loves of Robert Burns (1930) - Mary Campbell
- Why Sailors Leave Home (1930) - Slave Girl
- Night Birds (1930) - Mary Cross
- Midnight (1931, Short) - Dorothy Harding
- The Wickham Mystery (1931) - Joan Hamilton
- The Bermondsey Kid (1933) - Toots
- The Flaw (1933) - Irene Nelson
- Smithy (1933) - Daughter
- The Crimson Candle (1934) - Mavis
- Guest of Honour (1934) - Cissie Poffley
- Big Business (1934) - Sylvia Brent
- What's in a Name? (1934) - Mrs. Schultz
- Womanhood (1934) - Leila Mason
- Murder at Monte Carlo (1935) - Gilian
- Three Witnesses (1935) - Margaret Truscott
- Department Store (1935) - Dolly Flint
- Death on the Set (1935) - Laura Cane
- Man of the Moment (1935) - Miss Madden
- Scrooge (1935) - Fred's Wife
- Twice Branded (1936) - Sylvia Hamilton
- Jury's Evidence (1936) - Ruby
- They Didn't Know (1936) - Cutie
- The Last Journey (1936) - Daisy
- The Happy Family (1936) - Nia Harrison
- Such Is Life (1936) - Vicky
- Pearls Bring Tears (1937) - Pamela Vane
- Strange Adventures of Mr. Smith (1937) - Mrs. Maidie Smith
- Fifty-Shilling Boxer (1937) - Miriam Steele
- The Vicar of Bray (1937) - Meg Clancy
- The Angelus (1937) - Maisie Blake
- Silver Blaze (1937) - Mrs. Mary Straker
- When the Devil Was Well (1937) - Ann
- The Awakening (1938)
- His Lordship Regrets (1938) - Enid
- His Lordship Goes to Press (1938)
- One Good Turn (1951, Short) - Mrs. Lowery (final film role)
