= Sybil Grove =

English actress (1891–1957)

- Born: Sybil Marian Westmacott; 4 October 1891; Teddington, Middlesex, England, UK
- Died: 28 September 1957 (aged 65); UK
- Other name: Sybil Wingrove
- Occupation: Actress
- Years active: 1928-1938 (films)

Sybil Grove (4 October 1891 – 28 September 1957) was an English actress. She was born Sybil Marian Westmacott on 4 October 1891 in Teddington, Middlesex, and was also known as Sybil Wingrove.

With reddish brown hair and standing 5'8", she trained at RADA and her stage debut was in 1927. She had seven years in the UK in straight plays, revues and musical comedies then seven years directing and playing in her own stock company in the Orient. She also worked in the United States. She died in 1957, aged 65, and was interred in Weston Super Mare Crematorium & Cemetery.

== Selected filmography ==
- His Private Life (1928)
- A Bit of Heaven (1928)
- The Black Pearl (1928)
- Satan and the Woman (1928)
- Along Came Youth (1930)
- The Man from Blankley's (1930)
- Let Us Be Gay (1930)
- Sunshine Susie (1931)
- Hotel Splendide (1932)
- I'm an Explosive (1933)
- Red Wagon (1933)
- Maid Happy (1933)
- The Man from Toronto (1933)
- Too Many Millions (1934)
- Fighting Stock (1935)
- Luck of the Turf (1936)
- Tropical Trouble (1936)
- The Gay Adventure (1936)
- This Green Hell (1936)
- She Knew What She Wanted (1936)
- The Show Goes On (1937)
- Racing Romance (1937)
- Merry Comes to Town (1937)
- Why Pick on Me? (1937)
- What a Man! (1938)
