= Marjorie Taylor =

British actress (1912–1974)

- Born: 23 May 1912; Blackburn, Lancashire, England
- Died: 11 May 1974 (aged 61); Chichester, Sussex, England
- Occupation: Actress
- Years active: 1936–1940

Marjorie Taylor (1912–1974) was a British stage and film actress. She played the female lead in several Tod Slaughter films during the 1930s.

== Filmography ==
- The Heirloom Mystery (1936)
- The Crimes of Stephen Hawke (1936)
- Well Done, Henry (1936)
- Reasonable Doubt (1936)
- Nothing Like Publicity (1936)
- Racing Romance (1937)
- It's Never Too Late to Mend (1937)
- The Ticket of Leave Man (1937)
- The Elder Brother (1937)
- Silver Top (1938)
- Paid in Error (1938)
- Easy Riches (1938)
- Miracles Do Happen (1939)
- The Face at the Window (1939)
- Three Silent Men (1940)

== Bibliography ==
- Goble, Alan. The Complete Index to Literary Sources in Film. Walter de Gruyter, 1999.
