= Paid in Error =

1938 film

- Lillian Christine and George Carney in a publicity still for the film
- Directed by: Maclean Rogers
- Written by: H. F. Maltby; Basil Mason
- Story by: John Chancellor
- Produced by: A. George Smith
- Starring: George Carney; Lillian Christine; Tom Helmore
- Production company: George Smith Enterprises
- Release date: February 1938
- Running time: 68 minutes
- Country: United Kingdom
- Language: English

Paid in Error is a 1938 British comedy film directed by Maclean Rogers and featuring George Carney, Lillian Christine and Tom Helmore. It was written by H. F. Maltby and Basil Mason, and made as a quota quickie. The screenplay concerns a man who is mistakenly given a large sum of money at the bank.

== Preservation status ==
The British Film Institute National Archive holds a collection of ephemera and stills but no film or video materials.

== Cast ==
- George Carney as Will Baker
- Lillian Christine as Joan Atherton
- Tom Helmore as Jimmy Randle
- Marjorie Taylor as Penny Victor
- Googie Withers as Jean Mason
- Molly Hamley-Clifford as Mrs. Jenkins
- Jonathan Field as Jonathan Green
- Aubrey Mallalieu as George

== Reception ==
The Monthly Film Bulletin wrote: "It is a simple picture, simply acted. Googie Withers as Jean, Penny's girl friend, infuses most life into her part, There is a tendency to pad and introduce characters who do not help the main story. This makes it over-long."

Kine Weekly wrote: "Slender theme is helped out by amusing domestic incident in typical metropolitan boarding-house and pleasant romance. ... George Carney is in good form as the feckless Baker and rises to the sentimental demands of the part as well as geting the most of the comedy out of it. Tom Helmore is also good as the harassed cashier and a valuable contribution is made by Googie Withers as a hard-boiled girl clerk. Marjorie Taylor has not much to do as the ingenue, but does it gracefully."

Picture Show wrote: "It is brightly acted, efficiently directed, with some really amusing dialogue."
