= Merry Comes to Town =

- Guy Newall, Zasu Pitts and Hermione Gingold in the film
- Directed by: George King
- Written by: Evadne Price; Brock Williams
- Produced by: George King
- Starring: Zasu Pitts; Guy Newall; Betty Ann Davies
- Cinematography: Hone Glendinning
- Production company: Embassy Pictures
- Distributed by: Sound City Films
- Release date: 8 November 1937
- Running time: 79 minutes
- Country: United Kingdom
- Language: English

Merry Comes to Town is a 1937 British comedy film directed by George King and starring Zasu Pitts, Guy Newall and Betty Ann Davies. It was made at Shepperton Studios.

== Plot ==
Susannah Merridew ("Merry"), a prim Detroit secretary, inherits a small legacy and visits her London relatives. Though they assume she is a wealthy American, she finds Professor Stafford and his family impoverished. Using wits rather than riches, Susannah transforms their fortunes: she launches the Professor’s thriving correspondence school, reunites him with an old flame, foils a crook targeting his children, clears the family mortgage, buys Grandma an electric wheelchair, and secures a job for her cousin's fiancé.

== Cast ==
- Zasu Pitts as Winnie Oatfield
- Guy Newall as Prof. John Stafford
- Betty Ann Davies as Marjorie Stafford
- Stella Arbenina as Mme. Saroni
- Bernard Clifton as Dennis Stafford
- Margaret Watson as Grandmother Stafford
- Basil Langton as Noel Slater
- Muriel George as cook
- Tom Helmore as Peter Bell
- Cecil Mannering as Horace Bell
- George Sims as Sales Manager
- W.T. Ellwanger as Mr. Ramp
- Arthur Finn as Mr. Walheimer
- Sybil Grove as Zoe
- Dorothy Bush
- Hermione Gingold as Ida Witherspoon
- Mabel Twemlow as Mrs. C. Wriggle
- Jack Hellier
- Janet Fitzpatrick as woman
- Margaret Yarde

== Reception ==
Kine Weekly wrote: "Simple, pleasantly casual domestic comedy drama, held together by the sly wit and abundant resource of Zasu Pitts. The story, as a story, is more episodic than direct, but with the experienced star ever on parade to hold the many by-plots in clear perspective it manages to make the grade to the accompaniment of much wholesome laughter and no little heart interest. Homely and friendly, the film is agreeable light entertainment for the masses and the family, particularly the latter."

The Daily Film Renter wrote: "Zasu Pitts' second British talkie, with star as American girl who spends legacy on English vacation, most of which is devoted to extricating impoverished relations from trouble. Slender plot and production values undistinguished, with not particularly bright dialogue. Stellar personality, however, is well exploited in role that calls for pathos as well as comedy touches."

Picture Show wrote: "Zasu Pitts is delightful as the spinster, and is excellently supported by the rest of the cast, who give delicious pictures of a suburban household."
