= Not So Dusty (1956 film) =

British film by Maclean Rogers

- Directed by: Maclean Rogers
- Written by: Maclean Rogers
- Produced by: Bill Luckwell; Derek Winn
- Starring: Bill Owen; Leslie Dwyer; Joy Nichols; Wally Patch
- Cinematography: James Wilson
- Edited by: Sam Simmonds
- Music by: Wilfred Burns
- Production company: Bill Luckwell Productions
- Distributed by: Eros Films
- Release date: February 1956
- Running time: 78 minutes
- Country: United Kingdom
- Language: English

Not So Dusty is a 1956 black and white British 'B' movie comedy film directed and written by Maclean Rogers and starring Bill Owen, Leslie Dwyer and Joy Nichols.

== Plot ==
Two London dustmen (rubbish collectors) Dusty and Nobby, serving the borough of Twickenham, spot a couple in an apartment block stealing a book from the woman's sister. The crime is temporarily delayed by the maid. Dusty and Nobby find a diamond brooch in the bin outside the property. They enter the building to return it just as the owner, Miss Duncan, returns. This allows Dusty to meet Lobelia, the maid. He asks her out to the pictures.

Instead of cash, Miss Duncan gives them a book on the philosophy of Diogenes as a reward. This is the same book which the couple were trying to steal. An American is seeking the book offering $5000 (£500).

Nobby's son Derek takes it to a bookseller as part of a bundle of old books which need to be in groups of six. Thinking it is a valuable book, Nobby and Dusty break into the bookseller's to retrieve it.

They have to thwart the attempts of some criminals to con them out of it. Mrs Lincoln eventually finds them and gives them £500 for the book. However, it is revealed that the American seeks volume 1 and they had volume 2 which is worthless.

Volume 1 is tracked and they rush to the airport to get the American the copy just in time. He writes a cheque for more money.

== Cast ==
- Bill Owen as "Dusty" Grey
- Joy Nichols as Lobelia, Miss Duncan's maid
- Leslie Dwyer as Nobby Clarke
- Harold Berens as Driver
- Roddy Hughes as J.C. Layton
- Ellen Pollock as Agatha Lincoln
- Bill Shine as Alistair Lincoln
- Wally Patch as Burrows, the concierge at Miss Duncan's home
- Dandy Nichols as Mrs. Clarke, Nobby's wife
- William Simons as Derek Clarke
- Totti Truman Taylor as Charlotte Duncan
- Tony Quinn as Elmer J. Cobb
- Diana Chapman as receptionist
- Scott Sanders as Lancelot Barnaby Pennington, the bookseller
- Michael McKeag as 2nd actor
- Alexis de Galien as head waiter
- George Roderick as 1st waiter
- John Moore as 2nd waiter

== Production ==
The film was made at Twickenham Studios and on location around London. It is a remake of the 1936 film Not So Dusty which was also directed by Maclean Rogers. Wally Patch, who had co-written and starred in the earlier film, appears in a small role in the remake.

== Critical reception ==
The Monthly Film Bulletin wrote: "Rather laboured comedy, depressingly laced with topical gags. Joy Nichols sings pleasantly."

Kine Weekly wrote: "Low-life extravaganza, titivated with an occasional tune. ... Its script leaves little to the imagination, but happily its well known players never give up. It'll amuse the not too sophisticated."

Picture Show wrote: "'Cheerful comedy with slapstick touches."

In British Sound Films: The Studio Years 1928–1959 David Quinlan rated the film as "mediocre", writing: "Remake of 1936 film of the same title, brought up to date in rather laboured fashion."
