= Why Pick on Me? (1937 film) =

- Sybil Grove and Wylie Watson in the film
- Directed by: Maclean Rogers
- Written by: Kathleen Butler; H. F. Maltby; Jack Marks; Con West
- Produced by: A. George Smith
- Starring: Wylie Watson; Jack Hobbs; Sybil Grove
- Cinematography: Geoffrey Faithfull
- Production company: George Smith Productions
- Distributed by: RKO Pictures
- Release date: 16 July 1937
- Running time: 64 minutes
- Country: United Kingdom
- Language: English

Why Pick on Me? is a 1937 British comedy film directed by Maclean Rogers and starring Wylie Watson, Jack Hobbs and Sybil Grove. It was written by Kathleen Butler, H. F. Maltby, Jack Marks and Con West, and was made at Walton Studios as a quota quickie for release by the American company RKO Pictures.

== Preservation status ==
The British Film Institute National Archive holds no stills or ephemera, and no film or video materials.

== Plot ==
Hen-pecked Sam Tippett lives it up at a nightclub when his wife is away, until the club is raided. He sneaks away unseen, and goes to a police station to claim his dog, which he had earlier reported as lost. Here he is the victim of mistaken identity, when the family's new maid, Daisy, accuses him of having stolen her handbag. He denies the charge by claiming he was actually in the raided nightclub at the time. His farcical misadventures continue, including finding himself being mistaken for an eminent surgeon, and then as the patient awaiting an operation.

== Cast ==
- Wylie Watson as Sam Tippett
- Jack Hobbs as Stretton
- Sybil Grove as Mrs. Tippett
- Max Adrian as Jack Mills
- Isobel Scaife as Daisy Mog
- Elizabeth Kent as Bubbles

== Reception ==
The Monthly Film Bulletin wrote: "'This wildly improbable story owes practically all its entertainment values to Wylie Watson. Aided by bright dialogue he makes the bewildered little Sam an amusing figure. The supporting players are efficient at their job, and settings and technical qualities are good."

Kine Weekly wrote: "Fast-moving farcical comedy of conventional but nevertheless, cast-iron laughter-making complications The numerous characters are shuffled with no little dexterity, the team work is good, the dialogue smart, and the presentation neat."

The Daily Film Renter wrote: "Diverting farcical comedy of henpecked husband's night out and his desperate attempts to extricate himself from one tight situation after another. Sound comedy performance from Wylie Watson as misjudged and meek husband. Genuine ring to comic Cockney dialogue and several original wisecracks."
