= Maclean Rogers =

British film director and screenwriter (1899–1962)

- Born: Percy Miller Maclean Rogers; 13 July 1899; Croydon, Surrey, England
- Died: 4 January 1962 (aged 62); Harefield, Middlesex, England
- Years active: 1929–1960

Maclean Rogers (13 July 1899 – 4 January 1962) was a British film director and screenwriter.

== Selected filmography ==
=== Director ===
- The Third Eye (1929)
- The Mayor's Nest (1932)
- The Crime at Blossoms (1933)
- Summer Lightning (1933)
- Up for the Derby (1933)
- Trouble (1933)
- It's a Cop (1934)
- Virginia's Husband (1934)
- The Scoop (1934)
- The Feathered Serpent (1934)
- A Little Bit of Bluff (1935)
- The Right Age to Marry (1935)
- Old Faithful (1935)
- Marry the Girl (1935)
- A Wife or Two (1936)
- A Touch of the Moon (1936)
- The Shadow of Mike Emerald (1936)
- Not So Dusty (1936)
- To Catch a Thief (1936)
- The Happy Family (1936)
- The Heirloom Mystery (1936)
- Nothing Like Publicity (1936)
- Busman's Holiday (1936)
- Farewell to Cinderella (1937)
- Strange Adventures of Mr. Smith (1937)
- Fifty-Shilling Boxer (1937)
- All That Glitters (1937)
- Father Steps Out (1937)
- Why Pick on Me? (1937)
- Racing Romance (1937)
- Easy Riches (1938)
- Paid in Error (1938)
- If I Were Boss (1938)
- Darts Are Trumps (1938)
- His Lordship Regrets (1938)
- Weddings Are Wonderful (1938)
- His Lordship Goes to Press (1939)
- Miracles Do Happen (1939)
- Old Mother Riley Joins Up (1940)
- Shadowed Eyes (1940)
- Garrison Follies (1940)
- Facing the Music (1941)
- Gert and Daisy's Weekend (1942)
- Front Line Kids (1942)
- Gert and Daisy Clean Up (1942)
- Variety Jubilee (1943)
- I'll Walk Beside You (1943)
- Somewhere in Civvies (1943)
- Give Me the Stars (1945)
- Don Chicago (1945)
- The Trojan Brothers (1946)
- Woman to Woman (1947)
- Calling Paul Temple (1948)
- The Story of Shirley Yorke (1948)
- Dark Secret (1949)
- Something in the City (1950)
- Old Mother Riley's Jungle Treasure (1951)
- Madame Louise (1951)
- Salute the Toff (1952)
- Hammer the Toff (1952)
- Alf's Baby (1953)
- Flannelfoot (1953)
- Johnny on the Spot (1954)
- Calling All Cars (1954)
- Assignment Redhead (1956)
- Not So Dusty (1956)
- You Pay Your Money (1957)
- Not Wanted on Voyage (1957)
- Mark of the Phoenix (1958)
- A Clean Sweep (1958)
- Just Joe (1960)
- Not a Hope in Hell (1960)

=== Screenwriter ===
- God's Clay (1928)
- Glorious Youth (1929)
- Mischief (1931)
- Not So Dusty (1956)

=== Other ===
- The W Plan (1930) - editor
- A Warm Corner (1930) - editor
- Tons of Money (1930) - editor
- A Night Like This (1932) - editor
