= Racing Romance (1937 film) =

- Marjorie Taylor, Bruce Seton and Ian Fleming in the film
- Directed by: Maclean Rogers
- Written by: John Hunter
- Produced by: A. George Smith
- Starring: Bruce Seton; Marjorie Taylor; Eliot Makeham
- Cinematography: Geoffrey Faithfull
- Production company: George Smith Productions
- Distributed by: RKO Pictures
- Release date: 10 September 1937
- Running time: 63 minutes
- Country: United Kingdom
- Language: English

Racing Romance is a 1937 British comedy film directed by Maclean Rogers and starring Bruce Seton, Marjorie Taylor and Eliot Makeham. It was written by John Hunter and was made as a quota quickie for release by RKO Pictures.

== Preservation status ==
The British Film Institute National Archive holds a collection of ephemera and stills but no film or video materials.

== Plot ==
Harry Stone runs a local garage but his true passion is horse racing. At the racetrack he meets farmer's daughter Peggy Lanstone, who tells him that financial difficulties have forced her family to sell off their livestock. Brownie, her favourite horse, is due to go to auction after the next race. Harry bids for the horse and wins, but his fiancée Muriel Hanway is unimpressed, and tries to persuade him to sell Brownie and buy a new garage site instead. When Brownie only manages second-place in the big race, Muriel calls off the engagement and goes off with a rival suitor. But she leaves too soon to hear that the front-runner has been disqualified, making Brownie the winner of the impressive cash prize. Meanwhile, Harry and Peggy find romance.

== Cast ==
- Bruce Seton as Harry Stone
- Marjorie Taylor as Peggy Lanstone
- Eliot Makeham as George Hanway
- Sybil Grove as Mrs. Hanway
- Elizabeth Kent as Muriel Hanway
- Ian Fleming as Martin Royce
- Robert Hobbs as James Archer
- Charles Sewell as Mr. Lanstone

== Reception ==
The Monthly Film Bulletin wrote: "Bruce Seton, as the impulsive Harry, and Marjorie Taylor, as the quiet and ladylike Peggy, are good. They are well supported by the other characters; shrewish Muriel, her waspish mother, her father, impervious to his wife's hen-pecking, and the shop assistant, Harry's garage boy – all add touches of life and humour to the romantic story, and make the film an entertaining one."

Kine Weekly wrote: "Eliot Makeham steals the picture as Muriel's henpecked father who finally rounds on his nagging wife and gold-digging daughter. ... Story is neatly unfolded, and the director has made the most of the simple, human domestic humour which is the mainstay of the picture."

Picturegoer wrote: "There is quite sound romance and domestic humour in this simple little comedy."
