= Kathleen Butler (screenwriter) =

British screenwriter

- Occupation: Screenwriter
- Years active: 1934–1949 (film)

Kathleen Butler was a British screenwriter who worked on the scripts of over 40 films. She also worked as assistant director on four films. Butler was part of a group of women given increasing control over the writing of scripts in British cinema of the time, writing The Temptress (1949) alone. She worked for much of her career for the production company Butcher's Film Service.

== Selected filmography ==
=== Screenwriter ===
- The Right Age to Marry (1935)
- Old Faithful (1935)
- The Happy Family (1936)
- A Touch of the Moon (1936)
- The Heirloom Mystery (1936)
- Nothing Like Publicity (1936)
- A Wife or Two (1936)
- The Shadow of Mike Emerald (1936)
- Twice Branded (1936)
- Not So Dusty (1936)
- Strange Adventures of Mr. Smith (1937)
- Why Pick on Me? (1937)
- Busman's Holiday (1937)
- His Lordship Regrets (1938)
- Darts Are Trumps (1938)
- Weddings Are Wonderful (1938)
- Miracles Do Happen (1939)
- Garrison Follies (1940)
- Facing the Music (1941)
- Sheepdog of the Hills (1941)
- Front Line Kids (1942)
- Gert and Daisy's Weekend (1942)
- Gert and Daisy Clean Up (1942)
- Rose of Tralee (1942)
- Variety Jubilee (1943)
- I'll Walk Beside You (1943)
- My Ain Folk (1945)
- For You Alone (1945)
- Calling Paul Temple (1948)
- The Story of Shirley Yorke (1948)
- The Temptress (1949)

== Bibliography ==
- Harper, Sue. Women in British Cinema: Mad, Bad and Dangerous to Know. Bloomsbury Publishing, 2000.
