= Fifty-Shilling Boxer =

1937 film

Fifty-shilling Boxer
- Nancy O'Neil, Eve Gray, Moore Marriott and Bruce Seton in the film
- Directed by: Maclean Rogers
- Screenplay by: Guy Fletcher
- Produced by: George Smith
- Starring: Bruce Seton; Moore Marriott; Nancy O'Neil
- Production company: Walton Studios
- Release date: 1937
- Running time: 74 minutes
- Country: United Kingdom
- Language: English

Fifty-Shilling Boxer is a 1937 British comedy film directed by Maclean Rogers and starring Bruce Seton, Nancy O'Neil and Moore Marriott. It was written by Guy Fletcher, and was made as a quota quickie. A young boxer tries to build a career in the world of professional boxing.

== Preservation status ==
The British Film Institute National Archive holds a collection of stills but no film or video materials.

== Plot ==
When ageing fairground boxer Tim Regan retires, he helps launch the boxing career of young Jack Foster. After a period in the ring at 50 shillings a bout, Jack becomes an actor. In a play involving a boxing sequence, the star Miriam Steele falls for Jack, making both his girl Moira Regan, and Jim Pollett, the leading man, jealous. In the boxing scene Jack is goaded by Pollett, and – contrary to the script – knocks him out, ruining the play. But Jack's impromptu performance results in his professional return to the boxing world.

== Cast ==
- Bruce Seton as Jack Foster
- Nancy O'Neil as Moira Regan
- Moore Marriott as Tim Regan
- Eve Gray as Miriam Steele
- Charles Oliver as Jim Pollett
- Aubrey Mallalieu as Charles Day

== Reception ==
The Monthly Film Bulletin wrote: "Direction and settings fail to create the proper atmosphere of fairground and shoddy boarding house necessary for the story, but the boxing sequences and an impression of a theatre audience are both well done. The leading players are miscast and although they work hard their accents destroy conviction."

Kine Weekly wrote: "The character-drawing is not too convincing, but the story is comprehensive and has in its scope the key to pleasant light diversion. Cultivation of the homely touch is, however, the film's surest shield against criticism. Useful supporting feature for industrial halls and the family. ... Bruce Seton is an agreeable Jack, Moore Marriott is good as Tim, and Charles Oliver is sound as the morose Pollett, but neither one of them looks like a boxer, let alone shapes like one. Their acting is a modest triumph over miscasting."
