= Roy Lockwood =

English film, radio and television director and producer (1907–2002)

- Born: June 8, 1907; Bristol, England, U.K.
- Died: April 25, 2002 (aged 94); Yarmouth, Maine, U.S.
- Burial place: Riverside Cemetery, Yarmouth, Maine, U.S.
- Occupations: Film, radio and television director
- Years active: 1923–1946
- Spouse: Betty Lockwood (m. 1960–2002; his death)

Roy Lockwood (8 June 1907 – 25 April 2002) was a British film, television and radio director. His work included directing the radio soap opera Valiant Lady.

== Radio ==
In 1941, Lockwood left the British Press Service and joined the production staff of NBC in New York City. He joined the staff of the Blue Network as a producer in 1942.

Later, he was head of BBC "productions from America to Britain," which he left to become producer of Light of the World for General Mills on CBS in 1945. While with the BBC, his work included producing The War in the Pacific and a series of broadcasts about United States military forces from their beginnings to what was then the present time.

== Television ==
Lockwood was a producer for CBS-TV. His work there included producing Resources for Freedom in 1954.

== Film ==
In 1955, Lockwood became a producer-director for Robert Lawrence Productions in New York City.

== Filmography ==
- 1930 Counterpoint
- 1933 The Laughter of Fools
- 1934 Airport
- 1937 The Mutiny of the Elsinore
- 1938 You're the Doctor
- 1940 The Invisible Man Returns
- 1957 Jamboree

== Personal life ==
Lockwood was married to Betty, a native of South Carolina, who survived him by a decade. After living in New York City with her husband, they moved toYarmouth, Maine. She moved to Exeter, New Hampshire, after his death.

== Death ==
Lockwood died in 2002, aged 94. He and his wife of 42 years are interred in Riverside Cemetery in Yarmouth.

== See also ==
- List of film and television directors
- List of people from Maine
- List of people from New York City
