= Not So Dusty (1936 film) =

- Trade advertisement from The Daily Film Renter (12 May, 1936)
- Directed by: Maclean Rogers
- Written by: Frank Atkinson; Kathleen Butler; H. F. Maltby; Wally Patch
- Produced by: George Smith
- Starring: Wally Patch; Gus McNaughton; Muriel George; Philip Ray
- Cinematography: Geoffrey Faithfull
- Production company: George Smith Productions
- Distributed by: RKO
- Release date: May 1936
- Running time: 69 minutes
- Country: United Kingdom
- Language: English

Not So Dusty is a 1936 British comedy film directed by Maclean Rogers and starring Wally Patch, Gus McNaughton and Muriel George. It was written by Frank Atkinson, Kathleen Butler, H. F. Maltby and Patch. The film was made at Nettlefold Studios in Walton-on-Thames. In 1956 the film was remade, again directed by Rogers, and starring Leslie Dwyer and Bill Owen.

== Plot ==
London rubbish collectors Dusty Gray and Nobby Clark come into possession of a valuable book, and thwart the attempts of criminals to con them out of it.

== Cast ==
- Wally Patch as Dusty Gray
- Gus McNaughton as Nobby Clark
- Muriel George as Mrs. Clark
- Philip Ray as Dan Stevens
- John Singer as Johnny Clark
- Isobel Scaife as Mary
- Ethel Griffies as Miss Miller
- H. F. Maltby as Mr. Armstrong
- Raymond Lovell as Mr. Holding

== Critical reception ==
The Monthly Film Bulletin wrote: "The plot is over-elaborate, but the direction good. The Cockney atmosphere is well and consistently carried out and dialogue and sound recording excellent. Photography and settings are good and the acting by the leading comedians is excellent in the music-hall tradition and well supported by the rest of the cast. This production gives good, light entertainment of an unsophisticated type."

Kine Weekly wrote: "Low-life extravaganza, titivated with an occasional tune. ... Its script leaves little to the imagination, but happily its well-known players never give up. It'll amuse the not too sophisticated."

The Daily Film Renter wrote: "Full-bodied Cockney comedy. ... Dustmen's annual dinner, an amateur burglary, and arrival of bailiffs provide new Patch-McNaughton team with fair humorous material. Quite good slapstick music hall stuff."
