= Geoffrey Faithfull =

British cinematographer (1893–1979)

Geoffrey Faithfull B.S.C., (28 January 1893 – 1 December 1979) was a British cinematographer who worked on more than 190 feature films from starting in the industry in the 1910s. Faithfull also directed two films: For You Alone (1945) and I'll Turn to You (1946). He worked on several films with Michael Powell and among his later work was responsible for the 1960 SF classic Village of the Damned.

== Selected filmography ==
- Molly Bawn (1916)
- What Next? (1928)
- Wait and See (1929)
- Would You Believe It! (1929)
- The Silent House (1929)
- Red Pearls (1930)
- The Last Hour (1930)
- You'd Be Surprised! (1930)
- 77 Rue Chalgrin (1931)
- The Other Woman (1931)
- The Professional Guest (1931)
- Two Crowded Hours (1931)
- The Rasp (1931)
- Self Made Lady (1932)
- Little Waitress (1932)
- C.O.D. (1932)
- Above Rubies (1932)
- His Lordship (1932)
- Hotel Splendide (1932)
- My Friend the King (1932)
- Rynox (1932)
- The Rasp (1932)
- The Star Reporter (1932)
- My Lucky Star (1933)
- Born Lucky (1933)
- I'm an Explosive (1933)
- Prince of Arcadia (1933)
- After Dark (1933)
- Easy Money (1934)
- Boomerang (1934)
- Borrowed Clothes (1934)
- Two Hearts in Waltz Time (1934)
- Handle with Care (1935)
- Lend Me Your Husband (1935)
- The Right Age to Marry (1935)
- Luck of the Turf (1936)
- Such Is Life (1936)
- All That Glitters (1936)
- Her Last Affaire (1936)
- A Touch of the Moon (1936)
- Nothing Like Publicity (1936)
- Irish and Proud of It (1936)
- If I Were Rich (1936)
- This Green Hell (1936)
- Twice Branded (1936)
- The Shadow of Mike Emerald (1936)
- They Didn't Know (1936)
- The Vandergilt Diamond Mystery (1936)
- Born That Way (1936)
- Not So Dusty (1936)
- Busman's Holiday (1936)
- Farewell to Cinderella (1937)
- Racing Romance (1937)
- Why Pick on Me? (1937)
- Strange Adventures of Mr. Smith (1937)
- Little Miss Somebody (1937)
- You're the Doctor (1938)
- Many Tanks Mr. Atkins (1938)
- If I Were Boss (1938)
- Night Journey (1938)
- Weddings Are Wonderful (1938)
- Darts Are Trumps (1938)
- Lily of Laguna (1938)
- Miracles Do Happen (1939)
- Music Hall Parade (1939)
- Blind Folly (1939)
- Garrison Follies (1940)
- The Girl Who Forgot (1940)
- Pack Up Your Troubles (1940)
- Three Silent Men (1940)
- Death by Design (1943)
- I'll Walk Beside You (1943)
- Rhythm Serenade (1943)
- Headline (1944)
- The Story of Shirley Yorke (1948)
- Something in the City (1950)
- Honeymoon Deferred (1951)
- Marilyn (1953)
- Flannelfoot (1953)
- Johnny on the Spot (1954)
- Radio Cab Murder (1954)
- River Beat (1954)
- Stock Car (1955)
- Stolen Time (1955)
- Behind the Headlines (1956)
- Undercover Girl (1958)
- Life in Emergency Ward 10 (1959)
- Village of the Damned (1960)
- Dangerous Afternoon (1961)
- Clash by Night (1963)
- Naked Evil (1966)
