= Kate Plus Ten =

Kate Plus Ten may refer to:

- Kate Plus Ten (novel), a 1917 British crime novel by Edgar Wallace
- Kate Plus Ten (film), a 1938 British thriller film, adapted from the novel
