= Virginia's Husband =

Virginia's Husband may refer to:

- Virginia's Husband (play)
- Virginia's Husband (1928 film), a 1928 British silent comedy film
- Virginia's Husband (1934 film), a 1934 British comedy film
