= The Flag Lieutenant =

The Flag Lieutenant may refer to:

- The Flag Lieutenant (1919 film)
- The Flag Lieutenant (1926 film), a 1926 British war film
- The Flag Lieutenant (1932 film), a 1932 British war film
