= The Flag Lieutenant (1926 film) =

1926 film

- Directed by: Maurice Elvey
- Written by: W.P. Drury (play); Patrick L. Mannock; Leo Tover (play)
- Produced by: Norman Walker
- Starring: Henry Edwards; Lilian Oldland; Dorothy Seacombe
- Cinematography: William Shenton
- Production company: Astra-National
- Distributed by: Astra-National
- Release date: 1926
- Country: United Kingdom
- Languages: Silent; English intertitles

The Flag Lieutenant is a 1926 British war film directed by Maurice Elvey and starring Henry Edwards, Lilian Oldland and Dorothy Seacombe. It is based on the play The Flag Lieutenant by W.P. Drury. Its sets were designed by the art director Andrew Mazzei. The film proved to be one of the hits of the year at the British box office.

== Sequels ==
In 1927 Edwards starred in a sequel The Further Adventures of the Flag Lieutenant. The play was adapted into a film again in 1932, also starring Edwards.

== Cast ==
- Henry Edwards as Dicky Lascelles
- Lilian Oldland as Sybil Wynne
- Dorothy Seacombe as Mrs Cameron
- Fred Raynham as Major Thesiger
- Fewlass Llewellyn as Admiral Wynne
- Hayford Hobbs as D'Arcy Penrose
- Forrester Harvey as Dusty Miller
- Humberston Wright as Stiffy Steele

== Bibliography ==
- Richards, Jeffrey (ed.). The Unknown 1930s: An Alternative History of the British Cinema, 1929- 1939. I.B. Tauris & Co, 1998.
