= The Further Adventures of the Flag Lieutenant =

1927 film

- Directed by: W. P. Kellino
- Written by: W.P. Drury (story); George A. Cooper
- Produced by: Julius Hagen
- Starring: Henry Edwards; Isabel Jeans; Lilian Oldland; Lyn Harding
- Cinematography: Horace Wheddon
- Production company: Julius Hagen Productions
- Distributed by: Williams and Pritchard Films
- Release date: 4 November 1927
- Running time: 8,500 feet
- Country: United Kingdom
- Language: English

The Further Adventures of the Flag Lieutenant is a 1927 British silent action film directed by W. P. Kellino and starring Henry Edwards, Isabel Jeans and Lilian Oldland.

== Production ==
The film was made at Twickenham Studios by the German-born independent producer Julius Hagen. It was released as a sequel to The Flag Lieutenant which had been a major hit the previous year. It was also released with the alternative title Further Adventures of a Flag Officer. A third in the series, a sound film The Flag Lieutenant, was released in 1932.

== Cast ==
- Henry Edwards as Lieutenant Dicky Lascelles
- Isabel Jeans as Pauline
- Lilian Oldland as Sybil Wynne
- Lyn Harding as The Sinister Influence
- Fewlass Llewellyn as Admiral Wynne
- Fred Raynham as Colonel William Thesiger

== Bibliography ==
- Low, Rachael. History of the British Film, 1918–1929. George Allen & Unwin, 1971.
- Wood, Linda. British Films 1927–1939. British Film Institute, 1986.
