= Pender Hodge Cudlip =

English theologian and writer (1835–1911)

Rev Pender Hodge Cudlip
- Born: 1835; Porthleven, Cornwall, England
- Died: 1911 (aged 75–76); Sparkwell, Devon
- Occupations: Writer, clergyman, theologian
- Spouse: Annie Hall Cudlip (1867–1911)
- Children: Daisy, Ethel and Eric
- Writing career
- Pen name: PH Cudlip
- Genres: Non-fiction, religion, theology

Pender Hodge Cudlip (1835–1911) was an English Anglican High Church clergyman, theologian and writer. Born in Porthleven, Cornwall, he became well known as a preacher in Devon and spent most of his clerical life there. As the husband of writer Annie Hall Cudlip, née Thomas, he self-published a series of books on religion and theology between 1895 and 1905.

== Biography ==
Pender Hodge Cudlip was born to William Edgecombe Cudlip in Porthleven near Helston, Cornwall in April 1835. He attended the University of Oxford, matriculating on 25 April 1855 and receiving degrees from Magdalen Hall, – his BA in 1858 and MA four years later. While attending Oxford, Cudlip co-wrote an article, Music, with Tremenheere Johns and Pascoe Grenfell Hill for the Helston Grammar School Magazine.

Cudlip was ordained a deacon in 1860, then a priest by the Bishop of Exeter in 1861. His first clerical posting at Buckfastleigh, Devon, was followed by Modbury in 1861–1866. In 1867, while a curate in Yealmpton, also in Devon, he met Annie Hall Thomas and the two were married on 10 July that year. The couple had six children, of whom three survived to adulthood. One of his daughters later married Major William Price Drury, a Royal Marine, who wrote some nautical novels at the end of the century.

The Cudlips lived in Devon for most of their married lives, except for 1873–1884 spent in Paddington, London. Thereafter Cudlip was vicar of Sparkwell for 25 years. He also held the title of Rural Dean of Plympton. Before his death in 1911, Cudlip published several books on religion, including Bible Worship or The Continuity of Sacrificial Worship (1895), Meditations On The Revelations Of The Resurrection (1896), Why I Should Be Confirmed? (1898) and The Eucharistic Glory Of The Incarnation (1904).

== Bibliography ==
- Bible Worship or, The Continuity of Sacrificial Worship, 1895
- Meditations On The Revelations Of The Resurrection, 1896
- Why I Should Be Confirmed?, 1898
- The Eucharistic Glory Of The Incarnation, 1904
