= The Jewel (1933 film) =

1933 film

- Directed by: Reginald Denham
- Written by: Basil Mason
- Based on: The Strange Countess by Edgar Wallace
- Produced by: Hugh Perceval
- Starring: Hugh Williams; Frances Drake; Jack Hawkins
- Production company: Venture Films
- Distributed by: Paramount British Pictures
- Release date: October 1933
- Running time: 67 minutes
- Country: United Kingdom
- Language: English

The Jewel is a 1933 British crime film directed by Reginald Denham and starring Hugh Williams, Frances Drake and Jack Hawkins. It was written by Basil Mason based on the1925 Edgar Wallace novel The Strange Countess, and was produced by Hugh Perceval as a quota quickie.

== Preservation status ==
The British Film Institute National Archive holds a collection of ephemera and stills but no film or video materials.

== Plot summary ==
A family heirloom is stolen and the family attempts to recover it.

== Cast ==
- Hugh Williams as Frank Hallam
- Frances Drake as Jenny Day / Lady Joan
- Jack Hawkins as Peter Roberts
- Lilian Oldland as Lady Maude Carleigh
- Eric Cowley as Major Brook
- Geoffrey Goodheart as Mr Day
- Annie Esmond as Mme Vanheim
- Clare Harris as Mrs Day

== Reception ==
The Daily Film Renter wrote: "Weak and improbable Edgar Wallace 'thriller' in which hero undertakes fantastic subterfuges to prevent jewel robbery. Direction unimpressive, whilst suspense values and climax are definitely lukewarm. Francis Dean only cast member to achieve conviction, although given impossible dual role to fill. Booking on author's name and for uncritical patrons."

Picture Show wrote: "That it does not convince must not be attributed to the players, for Hugh Williams, Jack Hawkins and Frances Dean give excellent performances."
