= If I Were Boss =

If I Were Boss may refer to:

- If I Were Boss (1938 film), a British drama film
- If I Were Boss (1934 film), a French comedy film
