= The Price of Wisdom =

1935 film

- Opening titles
- Directed by: Reginald Denham
- Written by: Lionel Brown (play); George Dewhurst; Basil Mason
- Produced by: Anthony Havelock-Allan
- Starring: Mary Jerrold; Roger Livesey; Lilian Oldland
- Cinematography: Henry Harris
- Production company: British and Dominions
- Distributed by: Paramount British Pictures
- Release date: 12 February 1935
- Running time: 65 minutes
- Country: United Kingdom
- Language: English

The Price of Wisdom is a 1935 British drama film directed by Reginald Denham and starring Mary Jerrold, Roger Livesey and Lilian Oldland. It was adapted by George Dewhurst and Basil Mason from the play by Lionel Brown, and was made at British and Dominions Elstree Studios as a quota quickie for release by the British subsidiary of Paramount Pictures.

== Synopsis ==
Country girl Mary Newland moves to London to work and finds herself in a complicated situation involving her employer and one of his inventive young employees, whom she champions.

== Cast ==
- Mary Jerrold as Mary Temple
- Roger Livesey as Peter North
- Lilian Oldland as Jean Temple
- Robert Rendel as Alfred Blake
- Eric Cowley as Colonel Layton
- Ann Codrington as Miss Stokes
- Ivor Barnard as Pollit
- Cicely Oates as Bonny

== Reception ==
The Daily Film Renter wrote: "Comedy of misfortunes arising from injudicious mixing of love and business. ... Farcical climatic situation yields fair amusement. Spirited portrayal of downright modern girl from Mary Newland. Usable second feature. Although there is too much dialogue, the picture has the compensating merit of few digressions."

Picture Show wrote: "There is too much talk and too little action in this romance of a country girl who goes to London, and her adventures with a business magnate and his son. It is, nevertheless, unpretentiously pleasant, with some touches of comedy. Mary Newland and Roger Livesey are the young couple whose happiness is menaced by the magnate, and Mary Jerrold is engaging as the girl's mother."
