= Paul Blake (actor, born 1904) =

British actor (1904–1960)

Paul Blake (1904–28 January 1960) was a British actor.

== Selected filmography ==
- Lazybones (1935)
- Twice Branded (1936)
- King of the Castle (1936)
- The Crimson Circle (1936)
- The Lilac Domino (1937)
- Darts Are Trumps (1938)
- Welcome, Mr. Washington (1944)
- Gaiety George (1946)
- Green Fingers (1947)
- My Brother Jonathan (1948)
- Nothing Venture (1948)
- Castle in the Air (1952)
