= The Man at Six =

1931 film

- Feature on the film in Picture Show (9 April 1932)
- Directed by: Harry Hughes
- Written by: Harry Hughes; Victor Kendall
- Based on: The Man at Six by Jack Celestin and Jack DeLeon
- Produced by: Warwick Ward
- Starring: Anne Grey; Lester Matthews; Gerald Rawlinson
- Cinematography: Ernest Palmer
- Edited by: A.R. Gobbett
- Production company: British International Pictures
- Distributed by: Wardour Films
- Release date: 1 August 1931
- Running time: 70 minutes
- Country: United Kingdom
- Language: English

The Man at Six (also known as The Gables Mystery) is a 1931 British mystery film directed by Harry Hughes and starring Anne Grey, Lester Matthews and Gerald Rawlinson. It was written by Hughes and Victor Kendall based on the 1929 West End play The Man at Six by Jack Celestin and Jack DeLeon, and was produced as a quota quickie by British International Pictures at the company's Elstree Studios near London. It was released in America in 1932 as The Gables Mystery. The original play was also the basis for the 1938 film The Gables Mystery.

== Preservation status ==
The British Film Institute National Archive holds a collection of ephemera but no film or video materials.

== Plot summary ==
A butler is found murdered in an unfurnished mansion house.

== Cast ==
- Anne Grey as Sybil Vane
- Lester Matthews as Campbell Edwards
- Gerald Rawlinson as Frank Pine
- John Turnbull as Inspector Dawford
- Kenneth Kove as Joshua Atkinson
- Charles Farrell as George Wollmer
- Arthur Stratton as Sergeant Hogan
- Herbert Ross as Sir Joseph Pine
- Minnie Rayner as Mrs. Cummerpatch

== Reception ==
Film Weekly wrote: "Here is a British mystery film that is worth seeing, having all the elements that good examples of its type should have. ... The mystery is baffling, and so well is the story told by Harry Hughes that you are kept guessing all the while the action is taking place. The suspense is strong, and there are no jarring moments. All the cast are well chosen and play their parts well."

Kine Weekly wrote: "The whole thing strikes one as artificial, but the acting is good and the plot winds up with two good surprise twists."

Variety wrote: "Good British mystery-thriller, with plenty of action, heavy load of mystery stuff, good supply of comedy and sound suspense values."
