= Reginald Denham =

English fim director and actor (1894–1983)

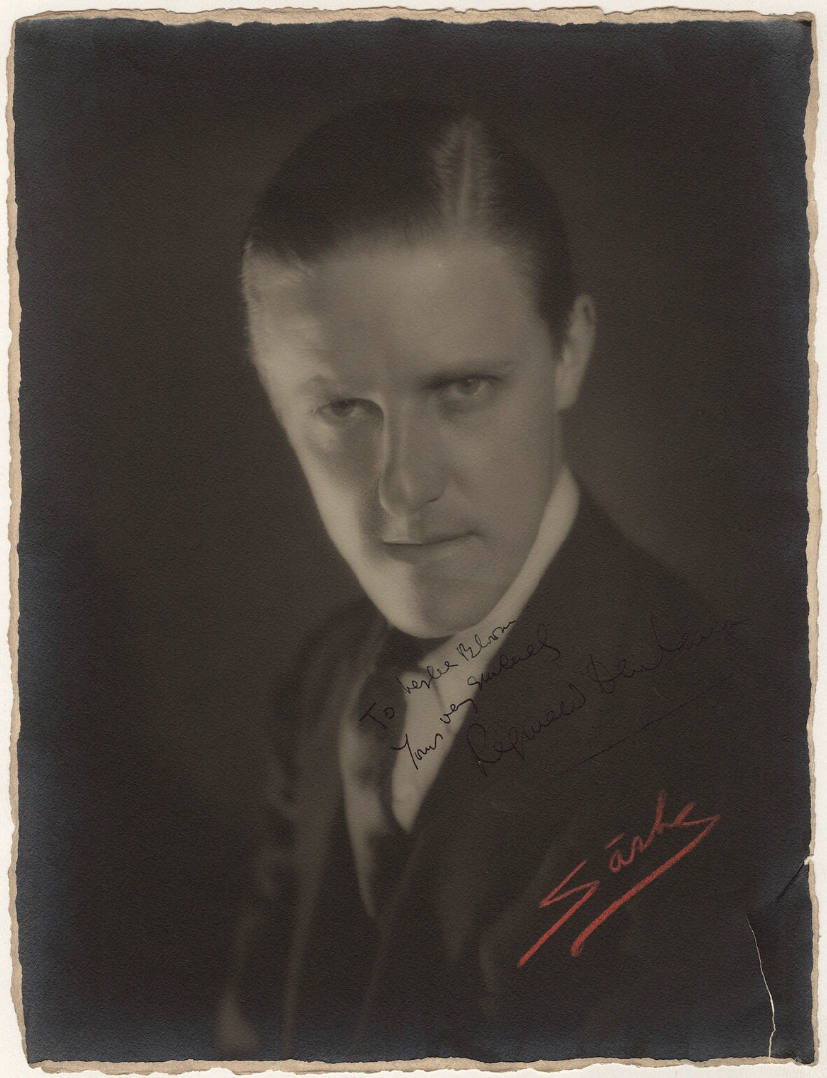
- Portrait of Reginald Denham in the 1920s.
- Born: 10 January 1894; London, England
- Died: 4 February 1983 (aged 89); Tenafly, New Jersey, U.S.
- Occupations: Writer; Theatre actor Film director Producer
- Spouse(s): Moyna Macgill (m. 1919–1924) Lilian Oldland Mary Orr (m. 1947)
- Relatives: Tamara Ustinov (granddaughter)

Reginald Denham (10 January 1894 – 4 February 1983) was an English writer, theatre and film director, actor and film producer.

== Biography ==
Reginald H. F. Denham was born in London, England, in 1894.

He spent a good part of his career directing Broadway theatre, with a career spanning from the melodrama Rope's End (1929) by Patrick Hamilton, to the courtroom drama Hostile Witness (1966). In 1930 he produced the First World War drama Suspense in the West End. He began working in the United States in 1943.

Denham's marriage to Irish actress Moyna Macgill ended in divorce in 1924. On November 15, 1924, he married English actress Lilian Oldland. They were divorced, and he married American actress and writer Mary Orr (from 1947 until his death). While they were married, Denham and Orr were writing partners. His daughter with Macgill, Isolde Denham, married actor Peter Ustinov when they were both 19.

Denham's autobiography, Stars In My Hair, was published by Crown Publishers in 1958.

He died following a stroke in Tenafly, New Jersey.

== Credits ==
=== Writer ===
- Paradies der alten Damen (1971) (play Ladies in Retirement)
- The Mad Room (1969) (earlier screenplay) (play Ladies in Retirement)
- Lux Video Theatre (2 episodes, 1954–1957)

Dark Hammock (1957) TV episode (play, with Mary Orr)
Ladies in Retirement (1954) TV episode (play, with Mary Orr)

- Alfred Hitchcock Presents (1 episode, 1956)

Help Wanted (1956) TV episode (adaptation, with Mary Orr)

- The Motorola Television Hour (1 episode, 1954)

A Dash of Bitters (1954) TV episode (teleplay, with Mary Orr)

- Broadway Television Theatre (1 episode, 1952)

Suspect (1952) TV episode (play, with Mary Orr)

- Mr. & Mrs. North (1952) TV series (unknown episodes)
- Suspense (4 episodes, 1949–1950)

The Suicide Club (1950) TV episode
Help Wanted (1949) TV episode (with Mary Orr)
Murder Through the Looking Glass (1949) TV episode (teleplay)
Dead Ernest (1949) TV episode

- Wallflower (1944) (play, with Mary Orr)
- Ladies in Retirement (1941) (play) (screenplay)
- Suspect (1939) (TV)
- Trunk Crime (1939) (play)
- Calling the Tune (1936)
- Ebb Tide (1932)
- Hombre que asesinó, El (1931) (adaptation)
- Stamboul (1931)

=== Director ===
- Blind Folly (1940)
- Flying Fifty-Five (1939)
- Kate Plus Ten (1938)

a.k.a. Queen of Crime (USA)
a.k.a. The Vanishing Train (USA: TV title)

- Dreams Come True (1936)
- The House of the Spaniard (1936)
- Calling the Tune (1936)
- The Crimson Circle (1936)
- Lucky Days (1935)
- The Silent Passenger (1935)
- The Village Squire (1935)
- The Price of Wisdom (1935)
- Lieut. Daring R.N. (1935)

a.k.a. Lieutenant Daring R.N.

- Borrow a Million (1934)
- Death at Broadcasting House (1934)

a.k.a. Death at a Broadcast (USA)
a.k.a. Death of a Broadcast

- The Primrose Path (1934)
- Brides to Be (1934)
- Lucky Loser (1934)
- Called Back (1933)
- The Jewel (1933)

=== Producer ===
- The Primrose Path (1934)
- Brides to Be (1934)

=== Actor ===
- Nothing Else Matters as Flash Harry (1920)
