= Lucky Loser (1934 film) =

- Trade advertisement
- Directed by: Reginald Denham
- Written by: Basil Mason; Anne Smith
- Based on: The Big Sweep (play) by Matthew M. Brennan
- Produced by: Herbert Wilcox
- Starring: Richard Dolman; Aileen Marson; Anna Lee
- Production company: British and Dominions
- Distributed by: Paramount British Pictures
- Release date: March 1934
- Running time: 68 minutes
- Country: United Kingdom
- Language: English

Lucky Loser is a 1934 British comedy film directed by Reginald Denham and starring Richard Dolman, Aileen Marson and Anna Lee. It was written by Basil Mason and Anne Smith based on the play The Big Sweep by Matthew M. Brennan, and made as a quota quickie at British and Dominion's Elstree Studios for release by the British subsidiary of Paramount Pictures.

== Preservation status ==
The British Film Institute National Archive holds a collection of ephemera and stills but no film or video materials.

== Plot ==
Hard-up young man-about-town Tom O'Grady meets Kitty Willoughby, and falls for her. To be near her he rents a room, using a false name, in the guesthouse she runs. There he encounters Ursula Hamilton, to whom he was engaged before he broke it off. He and Kitty fight, but a winning sweep ticket he had hidden in a desk smooths out their problems.

== Cast ==
- Richard Dolman as Tom O'Grady
- Aileen Marson Kathleen Willoughby
- Anna Lee as Ursula Hamilton
- Annie Esmond as Mrs. Hamilton
- Roland Culver as Pat Hayden
- Noel Shannon as Peters
- Joan White as Alice
- Gordon McLeod as auctioneer
- Mary Gaskell
- Alice Lane

== Reception ==
Kine Weekly wrote: "The story is really quite bright, and the acting has a certain engaging sincerity, but there is too much talk, and therefore too much footage. Lack of crispness and compactness, however, do not completely destroy the picture's merit as popular entertainment, and it should pass as a supporting feature in the smaller halls."

The Daily Film Renter wrote: "Bolstered up by light, irrelevant action, film has few laughs, and has been satisfactorily directed. ... Acting is on quite competent lines, Richard Dolman giving a pleasing study as the gay, debonair O'Grady. Anna Lee, as Ursula Hamilton, the girl who is engaged to Tom for only one night, gives a spirited portrayal, while Aileen Marson, as Kitty Willoughby, is effective, The entire action, with the exception of a stock shot of the race, takes place indoors, and the direction presents the film on straightforward lines."
