= Fewlass Llewellyn =

British actor (1866–1941)

- Born: 5 March 1866; Hull, East Riding of Yorkshire, England
- Died: 16 June 1941 (aged 75); London, England
- Occupation(s): Actor; Playwright; Theatrical producer
- Spouse: Caroline S. Lewis

Fewlass Llewellyn (5 March 1866 – 16 June 1941) was an English actor, playwright and theatrical producer. Previously an engineer, he made his stage debut in 1890, and appeared in various film roles, often as authority figures. A play he co-wrote with Ernest Martin formed the basis for the 1915 film The Coal King.

== Selected filmography ==
- Dombey and Son (1917)
- Goodbye (1918)
- The Lady Clare (1919)
- A Bill of Divorcement (1922)
- This Freedom (1923)
- The Flag Lieutenant (1926)
- The Further Adventures of the Flag Lieutenant (1927)
- Afterwards (1928)
- Virginia's Husband (1928)
- The Outsider (1931)
- These Charming People (1931)
- The Officers' Mess (1931)
- Lloyd of the C.I.D. (1932)
- Ask Beccles (1933)
- Seeing Is Believing (1934)
- The Secret of the Loch (1934)
- Red Ensign (1934)
- Royal Cavalcade (1935)
- Lazybones (1935)
- The Phantom Light (1935)
- Stormy Weather (1935)
- All In (1936)
- Second Bureau (1936)
- On Top of the World (1936)
- Tudor Rose (1936)
- Jack of All Trades (1936)
- Good Morning, Boys (1937)
- The Lilac Domino (1937)
- Brief Ecstasy (1937)
- It's a Grand Old World (1937)
- Special Edition (1938)
- A Spot of Bother (1938)
- Crackerjack (1938)
