= Tell it to the Marines =

Idiom

"Tell it to the Marines" is an English-language idiom, originally with reference to Britain's Royal Marines, connoting that the person addressed is not to be believed. The phrase is an anapodoton – the full phrase is "tell it to the marines because the sailors won't believe you", but only the first clause is usually given, standing for the whole. The idiom depends on its implication that marines, unlike the speaker, will gullibly believe nonsense.

== History ==
An early published use of the phrase is in 1804 in John Davis's novel The Post Captain; or, the Wooden Walls Well Manned; Comprehending a View of Naval Society and Manners: "You may tell that to the marines ... may I be damned if the sailors will believe it", and several similar shorter phrases in speeches by characters. Davis was a veteran of the navy. This original meaning of the phrase is pejorative to the Marines, implying that they are gullible.

In 1824, Sir Walter Scott used the phrase "Tell it to the Marines – the sailors won't believe it" in his novel Redgauntlet.

In 1864, Anthony Trollope used the phrase in his novel The Small House at Allington in the chapter titled Domestic Troubles: an angry speech by the character Mr.Lupex about his wife's doings, ending with "... Is that a story to tell to such a man as me! You may tell it to the marines!".

In 1864, William T. Sherman used the phrase, "Talk thus to the marines, but not to me" in his 10 September 1864 letter to General Hood, CSA, commanding the Army of Tennessee, in response to Gen Hood's complaints regarding Sherman's behavior to the people of Atlanta after Sherman had captured the city and ordered all residents of the city to evacuate.

In 1876, Anthony Trollope used the phrase three times in his novel The Prime Minister. Once in a conversation between the Duchess of Omnium and her husband the Duke of Omnium ("When he said this, she gave him a look which almost upset even his gravity, a look which was almost the same as asking him whether he would not—"tell that to the marines."); once by Ferdinand Lopez to Mr. Arthur Fletcher ("You may tell that to the marines. All the borough shall know what a coward you are."); and once by the Duchess of Omnium to the Duke of St Bungay ("If I were not very serious at this moment, Duke, I should make an allusion to the—Marines.").

In the 1942 comedy Once Upon a Honeymoon, Cary Grant's character is forced to read a pro-Nazi propaganda radio broadcast. He "warns" of the invincibility of the German war machine and instructs the Americans to be sure to tell the Army and the Navy and, above all, "Tell it to the Marines!!" Naturally, the Nazis don't get the reference.

It was used in 1905, by Edith Nesbit in her children's book The Railway Children. It is said by the Stationmaster when he catches Peter stealing coal from the Station in Chapter two.

The phrase was used in the 1942 serial G-Men vs the Black Dragon (it is a captured American agent's response to a sneering Japanese villain's account of Axis victories)

The phrase is the title of a British sitcom, Tell It to the Marines, which aired on ITV from 1959 to 1960. In a 1972 episode of Doctor Who (Day of the Daleks), the phrase was used as a duress code by the Doctor when speaking to the Brigadier (who would be familiar with it). "Tell it to the Marines" was the title of a 1975 episode of the American TV program Happy Days. In the 2000 Woody Allen comedy Small Time Crooks, the phrase is used when Ray (Allen) surprises his wife Frenchy (Tracey Ullman) with Belgian chocolates: "Tell it to the marines! You're up to something. Did you get caught hitting on a waitress?" In the Will & Grace episode "My Uncle the Car", character Karen Walker tells Beverley Leslie "tell it to the Marines, if ya already haven’t!" after he proclaims he would have made his shot while playing pool had she not intervened.

=== Revisionist hoax ===
In 1904 William Price Drury, a novelist and retired Lieutenant Colonel of the Royal Marine Light Infantry, wrote in a preface of a 1904 collection of his stories The Tadpole of the Archangel that King Charles II of Great Britain (reigned 1660–1685) said the phrase to Samuel Pepys; in Drury's origin story, the Marines knew from their travels that flying fish exist, but Charles II did not believe them. This version presents the Marines as astute and experienced world travelers rather than credulous dopes. This origin story was formerly widely believed, but Drury later admitted that it was a fabrication.

== Alternative meaning ==
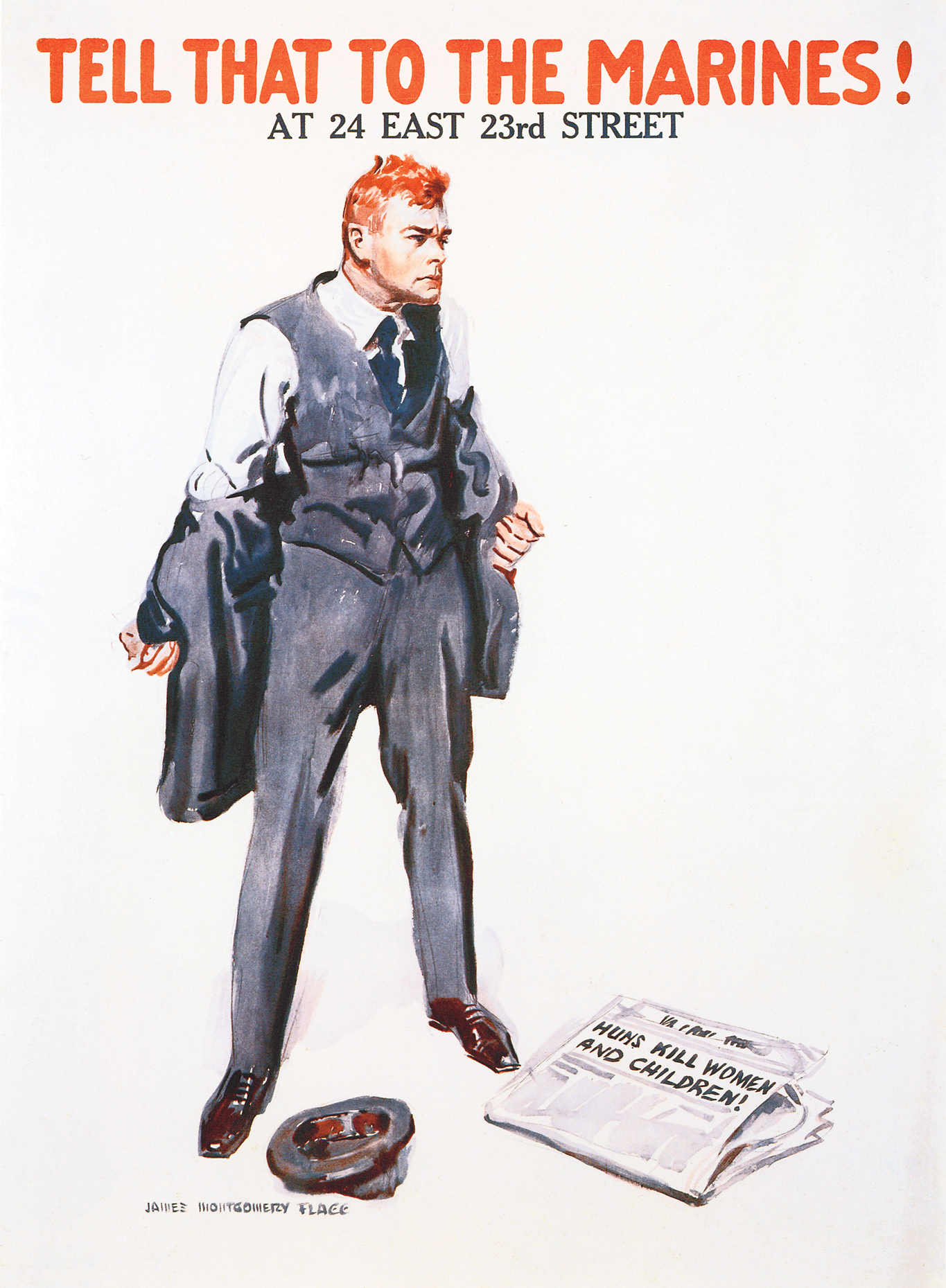
James Montgomery Flagg's 1917 recruiting poster

In America, the phrase, while still retaining its original use and meaning, also acquired a second meaning: if there's a wrong to be avenged, tell the Marines, because they will do something about it.

In 1917 in the United States, a recruitment poster shows a variation of the phrase and an enraged civilian who wants to enlist. This sense of the phrase has appeared in many American books, films, and other media. The 1926 film Tell It to the Marines shows the American media using the phrase in the context of the Marines as tough fighters rather than as gullible naifs.

Franklin Delano Roosevelt used the phrase during one of his wartime fireside chats. On February 23, 1942, referring to Axis propaganda doubting the American will to fight. "Ever since this nation became the arsenal of democracy – ever since enactment of Lend-Lease – there has been one persistent theme through all Axis propaganda. This theme has been that Americans are admittedly rich, (and) that Americans have considerable industrial power – but that Americans are soft and decadent, that they cannot and will not unite and work and fight. From Berlin, Rome and Tokyo we have been described as a nation of weaklings – 'playboys' – who would hire British soldiers, or Russian soldiers, or Chinese soldiers to do our fighting for us. Let them repeat that now! Let them tell that to General MacArthur and his men. Let them tell that to the sailors who today are hitting hard in the far waters of the Pacific. Let them tell that to the boys in the Flying Fortresses. Let them tell that to the Marines!"

The phrase was the title of a 1952 series of war comics from Toby Press and a 1960 album of Marine songs by Oscar Brand. "Tell it to the Marine" was used as an advertising slogan by Marine Midland Bank in the 1970s.

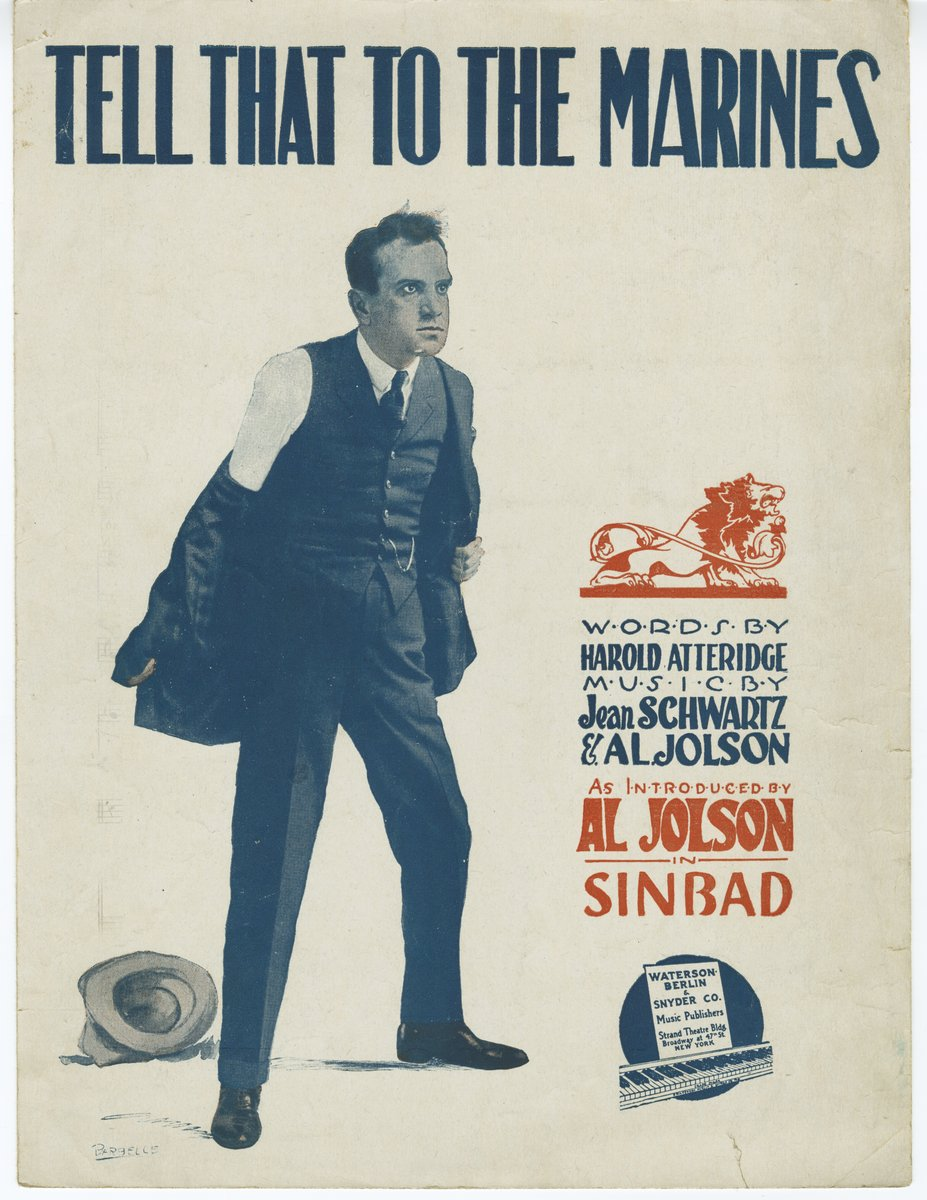
Sheet music cover of 1918 Al Jolson song mimics Flagg's poster.

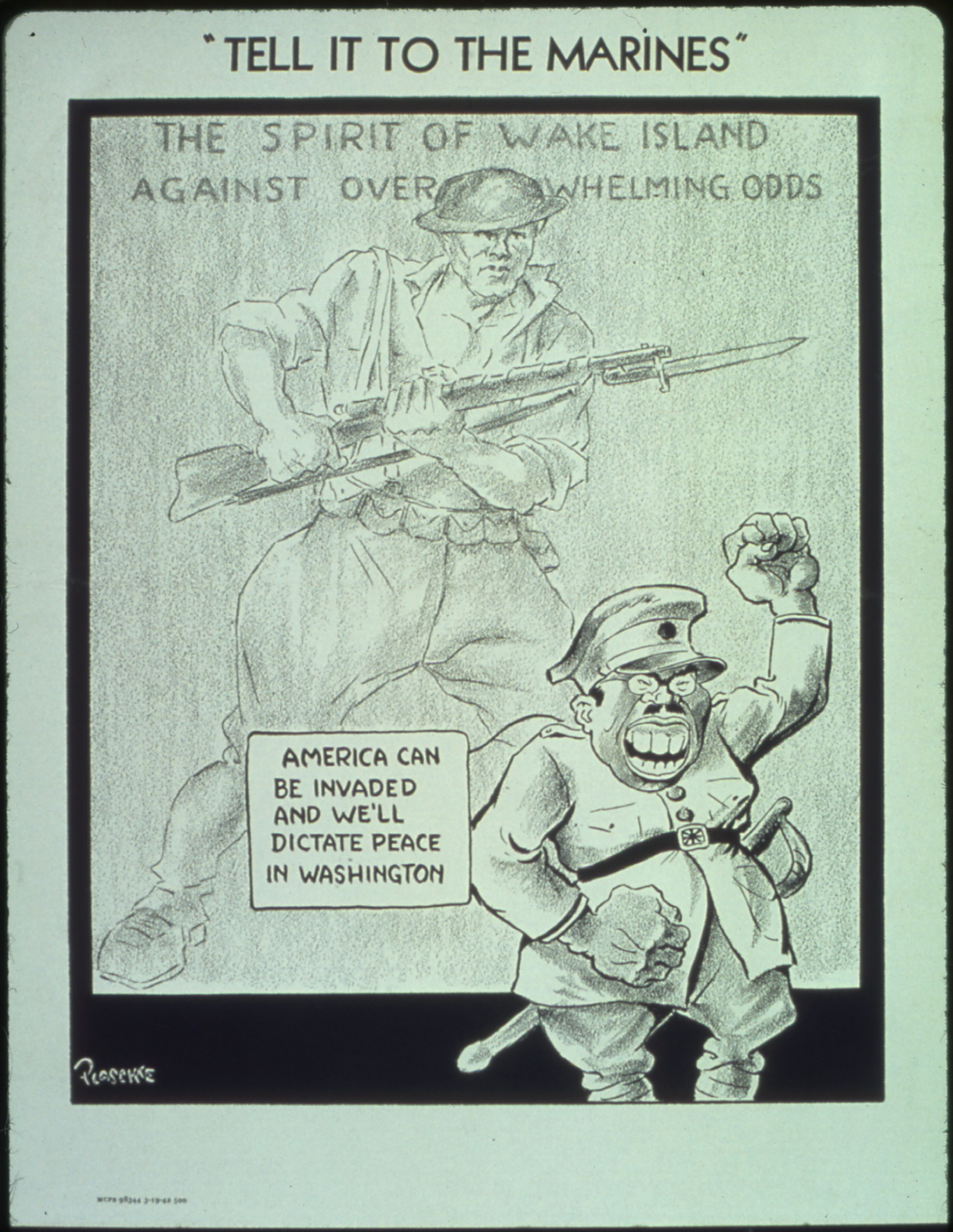
American World War II propaganda poster shows the Marines as avengers.

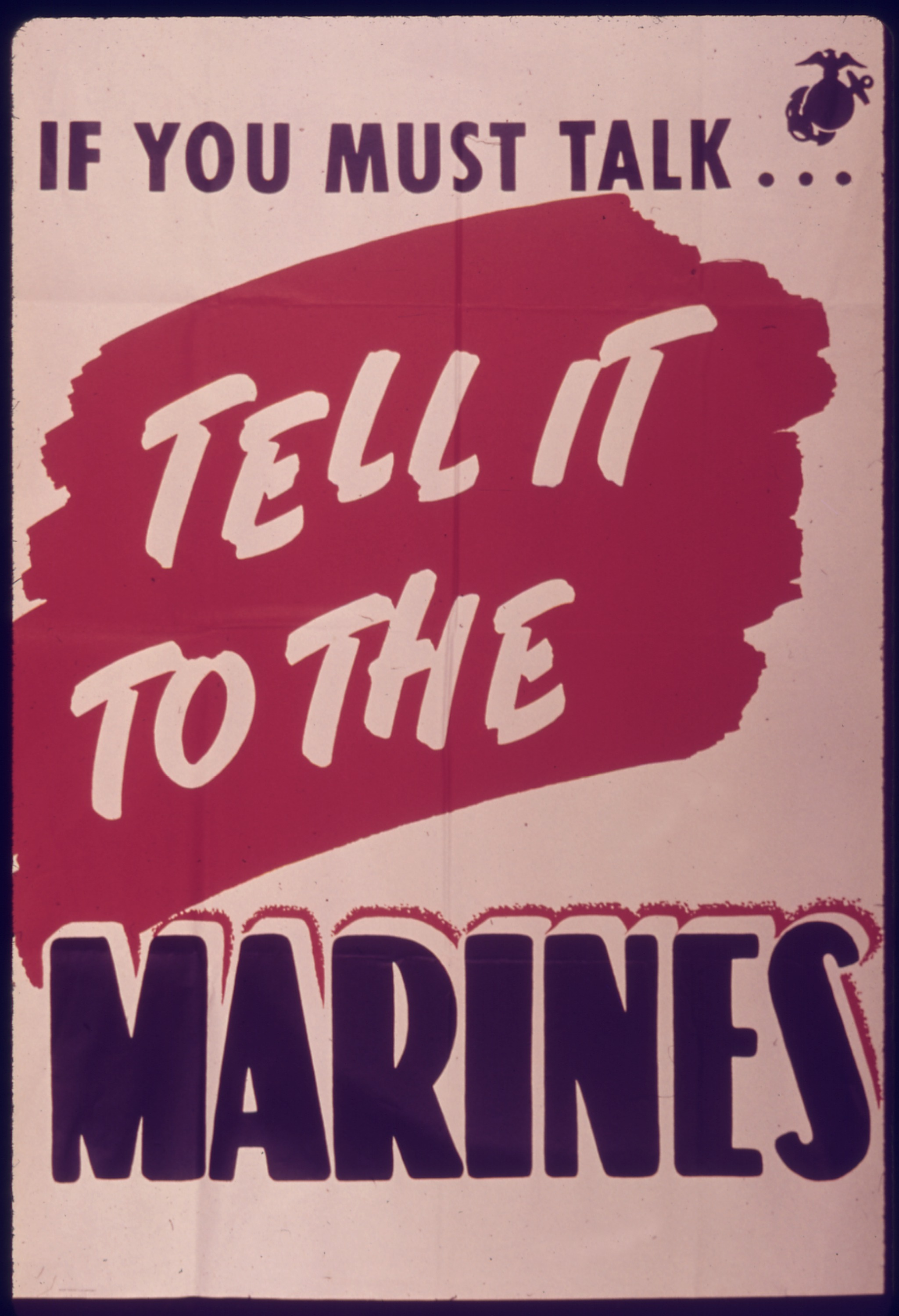
World War II propaganda poster of the "loose lips sink ships" variety implies trustworthiness.
