= Crackerjack (1938 film) =

1938 British film by Albert de

- U.S. poster
- Directed by: Albert de Courville
- Written by: A. R. Rawlinson; Basil Mason (adaptation); Michael Pertwee (uncredited)
- Based on: Man With 100 Faces by William Blair Morton Ferguson
- Produced by: Edward Black
- Starring: Tom Walls; Lilli Palmer; Noel Madison
- Cinematography: Jack E. Cox
- Edited by: R. Wilson
- Music by: Louis Levy
- Production company: Gainsborough Pictures
- Distributed by: General Film Distributors (U.K.); Gaumont British Picture Corporation of America (U.S.)
- Release dates: October 1938 (United Kingdom); 31 October 1938 (United States)
- Running time: 76 minutes
- Country: United Kingdom
- Language: English

Crackerjack (U.S. title: Man With 100 Faces) is a 1938 British comedy crime film directed by Albert de Courville and starring Tom Walls, Lilli Palmer, and Noel Madison. It was written by A.R. Rawlinson from an adaptation by Basil Mason of the 1938 novel Man With 100 Faces by W.B.N. Ferguson. It was made at Pinewood Studios with sets designed by Walter Murton.

== Plot ==
Three men rob a millionaire of diamonds aboard an airliner in flight. When Police Superintendent Benting tries to intervene, Jack Drake, another passenger, knocks him out to save him from being shot. The thieves force the pilot to land so they can dump the passengers. However, the men find the diamonds have already been stolen by someone else (Drake).

Drake is a sort of modern-day Robin Hood. He donates the proceeds of his latest robbery to fund the stalled construction of the "New Social Institute". He even writes a book, "Crackerjack": The true story of my exploits., which becomes a bestseller. Everybody is reading it, including the people at Scotland Yard and Baroness Von Haltz, and wondering if it is fact or fiction. The baroness tells her maid Annie that certain passages somehow remind her of Drake, who broke her heart.

By coincidence, she is residing in the same hotel as Drake. He goes to see her, but she does not forgive him for leaving her without a word in Berlin. He explains that he was forced to leave suddenly, but she is not mollified.

Meanwhile, Drake instructs Burdge, his secretary, to send a cheque for £10,000 to the Buckingham Hospital for a new wing, even though Burdge informs him he is overdrawn at the bank. Drake tells him that the wealthy Mrs. Humbold's pearls will provide ample funds. The Humbolds are hosting a masquerade ball that night, and the baroness will be there.

At the ball, part of the entertainment is a group called the "Four Gangsters", who have been tied up and replaced by a gang of real gangsters, the same thieves from the aeroplane caper. Sculpie, their leader, kills an unarmed man who foolishly tries to resist. Afterward, however, Sculpie is furious to learn that the pearls he took from Mrs. Humbold are fakes. Once again, Drake has the real ones.

An advertisement in the newspaper asking for Crackerjack's help intrigues Drake. He arranges to meet the person in trouble, who turns out to be the baroness, although he speaks with her indirectly, not face to face. She asks him to retrieve letters being used as blackmail by Hambro Golding. Drake is especially interested when she informs him that the letters prevent her from marrying. He promises to attend to the matter the next night. Unaware that Golding is actually a member of Sculpie's gang, she innocently informs him that Crackerjack will try to burgle his safe for the non-existent letters (Golding told her that Crackerjack had stolen his ring, a family heirloom). Sculpie is delighted. However, when the baroness returns for her forgotten handbag, she overhears the gang discussing Crackerjack's fate.

Suspecting that Drake is Crackerjack, she tries to stop him by making a dinner engagement with him, but when he does not show up at the appointed time, she makes Burdge take her to Golding's place. Drake is caught, but manages to turn the tables on the gang. He has also arranged for the police to raid the house as well. Drake gets away and flies off with the baroness to get married.

== Cast ==
- Tom Walls as Jack Drake
- Lilli Palmer as Baroness Von Haltz
- Noel Madison as Sculpie
- Leon M. Lion as Hambro Golding
- Edmund Breon as Tony Davenport
- Jack Lester as Boyne
- Charles Heslop as Burdge
- H.G. Stoker as Superintendent Benting
- Henry B. Longhurst as Insptector Lunt
- Ethel Griffies as Annie
- Edmund D'Alby as Lug
- Muriel George as Mrs. Humbold
- Andreas Malandrinos as Ducet
- Fewlass Llewellyn as Weller
- Hal Walters as Smithy
- Burton Pierce as specialty dance

== Reception ==
The Monthly Film Bulletin wrote: "The film is rather slow, and does not get into its stride until the last reel or two, and the earlier scenes are only saved by the debonair humour of Tom Walls from falling very flat."

Kine Weekly wrote: "Comedy crime drama, steeped in the Fopular 'Raffles' tradition. Tom Walls assumes the role of gentleman crook, and parades a gay debonair and thrilling versatility. Piquant femininity is charmingly applied by Lilli Palmer. A good supporting cast, ambitious sets and smooth direction complete the bright and, at times, exciting engagement."

The Daily Film Renter wrote: "Brisk melodrama depicting adventures of man-about-town, who secretly plays Robin Hood role by robbing wealthy people and giving proceeds to deserving charities. Tom Walls lends distinction to part of urbane 'Raffles,' cleverly portraying monocled Mayfairite in addition to assuming sundry disguises in course of nefarious activities. Plot motivation has excitement born of leading man's clash with American gangsters and piquant baroness who probes his secret, while fade-out sees Jekyll and Hyde-like hero neatly side-stepping police to board Continental airplane. Lilli Palmer affords star strong support. Entirely safe popular entertainment."

Picturegoer wrote: "The story is quite an Ingenious one, not wholly convincing but nevertheless fairly entertaining. It tails off rather at the end and it suffers somewhat from the too studied nonchalance assumed by the star. Lilli Palmer makes quite a good deal of none too fat a part."

Picture Show wrote: "Comedy and drama are deftly blended, and the film moves smoothly and briskly."
