= Sam Livesey =

Welsh actor (1873–1936)

- in Mr. Bill the Conqueror (1932)
- Born: Samuel Livesey; 14 October 1873; Flintshire, Wales, UK
- Died: 7 November 1936 (aged 63); London, England, UK
- Occupation: Actor
- Years active: c. 1883–1936
- Spouse(s): Mary Catherine 'Cassie' Edwards (1913–1936); Margaret Ann Edwards (1900–13)

Samuel Livesey (14 October 1873 – 7 November 1936) was a Welsh stage and film actor.

== Life ==
Livesey's father, Thomas, had been a railway engineer before leaving the industry to establish a travelling theatre with his wife Mary.

The two had six children who all grew up working in the theatre. In 1893, after Thomas's death, Mary opened a purpose built theatre, the Prince of Wales in Mexborough. The family performed frequently on the stage and in touring productions.

Sam and his brother Joseph married actresses who were themselves sisters: Sam married Margaret Ann Edwards in 1900 and Joseph married Mary Catherine Edwards in 1905. Sam and Margaret had two children who subsequently followed their profession, the actors Jack and Barry Livesey. But by 1913 both Joseph and Margaret Ann had died. Sam then married Mary Catherine and adopted her son Roger Livesey (his nephew) as his own. Roger also went on to become a highly successful stage and screen actor. The couple had a daughter together in 1915 whom they named Stella.

== Film career ==
Livesey had a successful film career encompassing both the silent and sound eras. He often appeared as authority figures; the cuckolded headmaster in Young Woodley, the dictatorial paterfamilias in Maisie's Marriage and a variety of Police inspectors and military officers. Alfred Hitchcock cast him as the Chief Inspector in the original silent version of Blackmail but in the subsequent sound version, the role went to Harvey Braban.

Livesey also worked with Anthony Asquith on Moscow Nights and Alexander Korda (appearing in Rembrandt with his stepson Roger, Dark Journey and cameoing in The Private Life of Henry VIII). Sam and Roger had previously appeared together playing father and son in the 1923 silent Maisie's Marriage. Nearly the whole family – Sam, Mary Catherine ('Cassie'), Jack and Barry – appeared as the Boyds in Variety (1935), a film revue directed by Adrian Brunel. One of Livesey's final roles was as Mr Tulliver, the owner of the titular Mill on the Floss, with James Mason portraying his son Tom.

== Partial filmography ==
- The Lifeguardsman (1916) - Capt. Salzburg
- One Summer's Day (1917) - Philip Marsden
- Spinner o' Dreams (1918) - Reuben Hundred
- Victory and Peace (1918, unreleased) - Capt. Schiff
- The Sins of Youth (1919)
- A Sinless Sinner (1919) - Sam Stevens
- The Chinese Puzzle (1919) - Paul Markatel
- The Black Spider (1920) - Reggie Cosway
- Burnt Wings (1920) - Joseph Heron
- All the Winners (1920) - Pedro Darondary
- The Marriage Lines (1921) - Martin Muscroft
- Married Love (1923) - Mr. Burrows
- Wait and See (1928) - Gregory Winton
- Zero (1928) - Monty Sterling
- The Forger (1928) - Inspector Rouper
- Blackmail (1929) - The Chief Inspector (silent version) (uncredited)
- Raise the Roof (1930) - Mr. Langford
- Young Woodley (1930) - Doctor Simmons
- One Family (1930) - The Policeman
- Dreyfus (1931) - Labori
- The Girl in the Night (1931) - Ephraim Tucker
- Jealousy (1931) - Inspector Thompson
- Many Waters (1931) - Stanley Rosel
- The Hound of the Baskervilles (1931) - Sir Hugo Baskerville
- Up for the Cup (1931) - John Cartwright
- The Wickham Mystery (1932) - Inspector Cobb
- Mr. Bill the Conqueror (1932) - Dave Lannick
- Insult (1932) - Major Dubois
- The Flag Lieutenant (1932) - Col. McLeod
- The Wonderful Story (1932) - Doctor
- The Private Life of Henry VIII (1933) - The English Executioner
- Commissionaire (1933) - Sergeant George Brown
- Tangled Evidence (1934) - Inspector Drayton
- The Great Defender (1934) - Sir Henry Linguard
- Jew Süss (1934) - Harprecht
- Regal Cavalcade (1935) - Drinker
- Drake of England (1935) - Sir George Sydenham
- Where's George? (1935) - Sir Richard Lancaster
- Turn of the Tide (1935) - Henry Lunn
- Moscow Nights (1935) - Fedor
- Variety (1935) - Charlie Boyd
- Men of Yesterday (1936)
- Calling the Tune (1936) - Bob Gordon
- Rembrandt (1936) - Auctioneer
- The Mill on the Floss (1936) - Mr. Tulliver
- Dark Journey (1937) - Major Schaeffer
- Wings of the Morning (1937) - Angelo (final film role)
