= Peter Haddon =

British actor (1898–1962)

- Born: Peter Haddon Tildsley; 31 March 1898; Rawtenstall, Lancashire, England
- Died: 7 September 1962 (aged 64)
- Occupation: Actor
- Spouses: Rosaline Jane Courtneidge (m. 1925; died 1926) Edith Ralston Hicks Lyon (m. 1932, divorced by 1945)

Peter Haddon (31 March 1898 – 7 September 1962) was an English actor.

== Personal life ==
Haddon was born Peter Haddon Tildsley in Rawtenstall, Lancashire. He was the son of Alfred and Mary Tildsley; he had a brother, Vincent Harvey (born 1894), and two sisters, Edna and Mary. His father was a clergyman.

In 1925, he married Rosaline Jane Courtneidge (1903–1926), a daughter of Robert Courtneidge; her eldest sister was Cicely Courtneidge. Peter and Rosaline Tildsley had a daughter, Rosaline (1926–2011). In 1932, as a widower, he married divorcee Edith Ralston Hicks Lyon, née Huxtable. By 1945 she had remarried.

== Career ==
He first became associated with the theatre as a member of the Footlights Dramatic Society while reading medicine at Caius College, Cambridge. His first professional appearance was at the Adelphi Theatre, London in 1920, and he went on to appear at almost every London theatre. Among his stage credits in the 1920s were Charlot's Revue (1925 and 1927, with Beatrice Lillie and Gertrude Lawrence) and Good Morning, Bill (1928), in which his understudy was William Hartnell. His 1930s credits included Paulette, Tell Her the Truth (with Bobby Howes and Alfred Drayton), That's a Pretty Thing, Who's Who, Anything Goes (Palace Theatre, London, 1935), Love and Let Love (with Claire Luce), No Sleep for the Wicked and Under Your Hat (with Jack Hulbert and Cicely Courtneidge).

He entered films in the mid-1920s, wrote several plays, and in 1935 became the first actor to portray Dorothy L. Sayers' fictional detective Lord Peter Wimsey on screen. In 1947, after war service, he co-starred with Robertson Hare in the West End comedy She Wanted a Cream Front Door. In the 1940s and 1950s, he made numerous theatrical tours in the provinces. In 1952 he appeared in Lord Arthur Savile's Crime at the Court Theatre, and the following year he formed his own company, assuming the management of the Hippodrome in Aldershot and presenting weekly repertory. In 1955, he transferred his company to Wimbledon and continued as actor-manager of the Wimbledon Theatre until his death in 1962.

== Filmography ==
- The Second Mrs. Tanqueray (1952) – Sir George Orreyed
- Moulin Rouge (1952) (uncredited)
- Helter Skelter (1949) – Major Basil Beagle
- Over the Moon (1939) – Lord Petcliffe
- Good Morning, Bill (1939) (TV) – Bill
- Kate Plus Ten (1938) – Boltover
- The House of the Spaniard (1936) – David Grey
- The Beloved Vagabond (1936) – Major Walters
- Mother, Don't Rush Me (1936) – Adolphe
- Public Nuisance No. 1 (1936/I) – Richard Trelawny
- The Secret of Stamboul (1936) – Peter
- No Monkey Business (1935) – Arthur
- The Silent Passenger (1935) – Lord Peter Wimsey
- Who's Your Father (1935) – Frank Steadley
- Death at Broadcasting House (1934) – Guy Bannister
- Alf's Button (1930) – Lieutenant Allen
- Greek Street (1930) – Businessman
- Oxford Bags (1926) – The Golfer
- The Clicking of Cuthbert (1924) – Cuthbert
- Lizzie's Last Lap (1924) – Fibs-Gerald

== Early TV ==
• Good Morning, Bill! (4 jun 1939)
A comedy by P. G. Wodehouse
Author	P. G. Wodehouse
Producer	Royston Morley
Bill	Peter Haddon
Lord Tidmouth	Michael Shipley
Sir Hugo Drake	Brefni O'Rorke
