= Florence Kilpatrick =

English novelist, playwright (1888–1968)

Florence Antoinette Kilpatrick (1888–1968) was a British author and playwright whose plays were made into films Virginia's Husband and The Hellcat.

== Career ==
Kilpatrick adapted two of her novels into plays which, in turn, were made into films. Her novel Virginia's Husband was dramatised as a farcical comedy in 1926. Two versions of the film were produced in 1928 and 1934. Wildcat Hetty was also dramatised and performed as Wildcat Hetty and Hell Cat Hetty in 1927, starring Dorothy Minto. It was adapted to the film The Hellcat.

The novel The Eldest Miss Grimmett was dramatised as Murder without Tears in 1938.

Kilpatrick travelled to South America and Africa to gather material for her novels.

Kilpatrick died in 1968.

== Works ==
=== Plays ===
- Virginia's Husband (1926)
- Hell Cat Hetty (1927)
- Murder without Tears (1938)
- Easy Living (1943)

=== Novels ===
- Our Elizabeth (1920)
- Educating Ernestine (1921)
- Our Elizabeth Again (1923)
- Sunshine Street (1923)
- Camilla in a Caravan (1925)
- Virginia's Husband (1925)
- Red Dust, a Romance of East Africa (1926)
- Wildcat Hetty (1927)
- Something always Happens! (1928)
- Hetty's Son (1929)
- Rift Valley (1930)
- Illicit (1932)
- Our Elizabeth Returns (1933)
- Oh, Joy! (1933)
- Hetty Married; a sequel to Wildcat Hetty (1933)
- Getting George married (1933)
- Paradise Limited (1935)
- White Man, Black Man (1935)
- Sea Fever (1936)
- The Eldest Miss Grimmett (1936)
- What a Liberty (1937)
- Six Marriages (1937)
- Within Four Walls (1938)
- Elizabeth in Africa (1940)
- Men are just Marvellous (1941)
- Elizabeth to the Rescue (1942)
- Elizabeth in Wartime (1942)
- Motive for Murder (1944)
- Gentlemen Should Marry (1942)
- Elizabeth the Sleuth (1946)
- Elizabeth finds the Body (1949)
