= Basil Mason =

British screenwriter

Basil Mason was a British screenwriter. He worked on more than thirty films during his career.

== Filmography ==
- Ebb Tide (1932)
- Women Who Play (1932)
- Aren't We All? (1932)
- Insult (1932)
- Puppets of Fate (1933)
- The Jewel (1933)
- Lucky Loser (1934)
- Brides to Be (1934)
- The Primrose Path (1934)
- Girls Please! (1934)
- Easy Money (1934)
- The Scoop (1934)
- Death at Broadcasting House (1934)
- The Price of Wisdom (1935)
- Key to Harmony (1935)
- Once a Thief (1935)
- The Silent Passenger (1935)
- Checkmate (1935)
- Gentlemen's Agreement (1935)
- Calling the Tune (1936)
- The House of the Spaniard (1936)
- Wake Up Famous (1937)
- Secret Lives (1937)
- The Lilac Domino (1937)
- Brief Ecstasy (1937)
- Paid in Error (1938)
- If I Were Boss (1938)
- Crackerjack (1938)
- What a Man! (1938)
- Candles at Nine (1944)
- Teheran (1946)
- White Cradle Inn (1947)
- Call of the Blood (1947)

== Bibliography ==
- Goble, Alan. The Complete Index to Literary Sources in Film. Walter de Gruyter, 1999.
