= Borrow a Million =

1934 British film by Reginald Denham

- Vera Bogetti and Charles Cullum in the film
- Directed by: Reginald Denham
- Written by: Margaret McDonnell
- Starring: Reginald Gardiner; Vera Bogetti; Wally Patch
- Production company: Fox Film Company
- Distributed by: Fox Film Company
- Release date: December 1934
- Country: United Kingdom
- Language: English

Borrow a Million is a 1934 British comedy film directed by Reginald Denham and starring Reginald Gardiner, Vera Bogetti and Wally Patch. It was written by Margaret McDonnell and made at Wembley Studios as a quota quickie by the British subsidiary of the Fox Film Company.

== Synopsis ==
Michael Trent, the owner of a one-man tea company, accepts a huge loan and establishes a chain of tea stores, but discovers that someone is leaking confidential information about his business, which is destroying the company.

== Cast ==
- Reginald Gardiner as Alastair Cartwright
- Vera Bogetti as Adele Cartwright
- Charles Cullum as Michael Trent
- Wally Patch as Bodgers
- Meriel Forbes as Eileen Dacres
- Robert Rendel as Struthers
- Roland Culver as Charles Nutford
- Wilson Coleman as Blake
- Gordon McLeod as Bowers

== Reception ==
The Daily Film Renter wrote: "Moderate dramatic, comedy and acting values, with adequate settings and technical qualities. Lacking conviction owing to loose construction, ranks only as quota supporting feature. ... There is little in the film to lift it out of the ranks of mediocrity, and it seems to bear evidence of having been rushed together without great expenditure of effort."

Picturegoer wrote: "Simple unpretentious comedy. ... Charles Cullum is sound as Michael, the tea shop proprietor and Meriel Forbes is unaffected and capable as Eileen. Wally Patch turns in a good character study as the transport manager as does Vera Bogetti as the lady responsible for the leakage of information."
