= Brief Ecstasy =

1937 British film by Edmond T. Gréville

- Directed by: Edmond T. Gréville
- Written by: Basil Mason
- Produced by: Hugh Perceval
- Starring: Paul Lukas; Hugh Williams; Linden Travers; Marie Ney
- Cinematography: Henry Harris; Ronald Neame
- Edited by: Ray Pitt
- Music by: Walter Goehr
- Release date: 17 August 1937
- Running time: 72 minutes
- Country: United Kingdom
- Language: English

Brief Ecstasy (also known as Dangerous Secrets) is a 1937 British drama film directed by Edmond T. Gréville and starring Paul Lukas, Hugh Williams, Linden Travers and Marie Ney. It was written by Basil Mason, and made at Ealing Studios as a quota quickie.

== Plot ==
Helen Norwood falls in love with young aviator Jim Wyndham, but he has to leave for India. The years pass and she marries Professor Paul Bernardy. When Jim turns up again, Helen is still attracted to him, but it turns out he is a long-standing friend of Paul. Eventually Helen decices to stay loyal to Paul.

== Cast ==
- Paul Lukas a Professor Paul Bernardy
- Hugh Williams as Jim Wyndham
- Linden Travers as Helen Norwood Bernardy
- Marie Ney as Martha Russell
- Renee Gadd as Marjorie
- Fred Withers as Gardener
- Howard Douglas as Coleman
- Fewlass Llewellyn as director of steel company
- Peter Gawthorne as chairman of steel company
- Norman Pierce as landlord

== Reception ==
Kine Weekly wrote: "Triangle drama, cloaking a somewhat conventional story by polished acting, direction and production qualities. Although the plot, one of shattered illusions, promises more than it gives, it is, nevertheless, sufficiently near to feminine appeal to offer sound emotional refreshment for the majority. Furthermore, star values are al distinct asset."

The Daily Film Renter wrote: "Plot paucity emphasised by 'intense' directorial style, while action lamentably lacking, and players hard put to it to infuse characterisations with interest. Told mainly with large close-ups and banal dialogue, this offering is likely to please only indulgent patronage."

Writing for Night and Day in 1937, Graham Greene gave the film a good review, expressing admiration for producer Perceval's ability to "wring twenty shillings' worth out of every pound" and director Gréville's recognition that for a film whose subject is sexual passion "the story doesn't matter; it's the atmosphere which counts". Greene praised Gréville's "wanton and vivid" depictions of "undifferentiated desire" as well as his French education in "photograph[ing] a woman's body – uncompromisingly", and noted that "the film at its finest [...] generalizes", and "there isn't, thank God, any love in it".
