= The Hellcat =

1928 film

- Directed by: Harry Hughes
- Produced by: Archibald Nettlefold
- Starring: Mabel Poulton; Eric Bransby Williams; John F. Hamilton; Pauline Johnson
- Production company: Nettlefold Films
- Distributed by: Butcher's Film Service
- Release date: March 1928
- Running time: 6,700 feet
- Country: United Kingdom
- Language: English

The Hellcat is a 1928 British silent romance film directed by Harry Hughes and starring Mabel Poulton, Eric Bransby Williams and John F. Hamilton. It was based on the play Wilcat Hetty by Florence Kilpatrick and made at the Nettlefold Studios in Walton-on-Thames.

== Cast ==
- Mabel Poulton as Hetty
- Eric Bransby Williams as Stephen Tredegar
- John F. Hamilton as Bert Stiles
- Pauline Johnson as Nancy Price
- Johnny Butt as Lloyd
- Mary Dibley as Mrs. Price
- Charles Dormer as Gilded youth
- Gerald Rawlinson as David Birkett
- Frank Stanmore as Butler

== Bibliography ==
- Low, Rachael. History of the British Film, 1918-1929. George Allen & Unwin, 1971.
- Wood, Linda. British Films 1927-1939. British Film Institute, 1986.
