= Jealousy (1931 film) =

1931 film

- Malcolm Keen and Gibb McLaughlin in the film.
- Directed by: G.B. Samuelson
- Written by: John McNally
- Based on: The Green Eye by John McNally
- Produced by: E. Gordon Craig
- Starring: Lilian Oldland; Malcolm Keen; Harold French
- Cinematography: Desmond Dickinson
- Production company: Majestic Film Company
- Distributed by: Warner Brothers
- Release date: 28 August 1931
- Running time: 56 minutes
- Country: United Kingdom
- Language: English

Jealousy is a 1931 British drama film directed by G.B. Samuelson and starring Lilian Oldland, Malcolm Keen, Harold French and Frank Pettingell. It was written by John McNally based on his play The Green Eye, and was shot at Isleworth Studios as a quota quickie for distribution by Warner Brothers.

== Preservation status ==
The British Film Institute National Archive holds a collection of stills but no film or video materials.

== Synopsis ==
The film follows a man who falls madly in love with a woman and stages a robbery in an effort to frame her sweetheart.

== Cast ==
- Lilian Oldland as Joyce Newcombe (credited as Mary Newland)
- Malcolm Keen as Henry Garwood
- Harold French as Bernard Wingate
- Gibb McLaughlin as Littleton Pardmore
- Sam Livesey as Inspector Thompson
- Henrietta Watson as Mrs. Delahunt
- Henry Carlisle as Clayton
- Frank Pettingell as Professor Macguire

== Reception ==
Film Weekly wrote: "There is little to recommend this story ... The development is tortoise-like; the acting is heavy with melodramatic emphasis; the dialogue reverberates with ponderous menace or remorse. One or two good cameos by the small-part players are the best things in an indifferent film."

Kine Weekly wrote: "Malcolm Keen gives a very fine study of the jealous guardian, in the grip of emotions that are too strong for him. As Joyce, Mary Newland is charming, and Sam Livesey offers a very good few minutes as the inspector. ... G. B. Samuelson has done good work with the production, though there is a tendency to prolong conversational patches, and the film would benefit by cutting."
