= Aren't We All? (film) =

1932 film by Harry Lachman

- Feature on the film from Picture Show (1 October 1932)
- Directed by: Harry Lachman
- Written by: Basil Mason; Gilbert Wakefield
- Based on: 1923 play Aren't We All? by Frederick Lonsdale
- Produced by: Walter Morosco
- Starring: Gertrude Lawrence; Hugh Wakefield; Owen Nares
- Cinematography: Rudolph Maté; Jack Whitehead
- Production company: Paramount British Pictures
- Distributed by: Paramount British Pictures
- Release date: 18 March 1932
- Running time: 80 minutes
- Country: United Kingdom
- Language: English

Aren't We All? is a 1932 British comedy film directed by Harry Lachman and starring Gertrude Lawrence, Hugh Wakefield and Owen Nares. It was written by Basil Mason and Gilbert Wakefield based on the 1923 play Aren't We All? by Frederick Lonsdale, and was made at British and Dominions Elstree Studios.

A print is preserved in the Library of Congress collection.

== Cast ==
- Gertrude Lawrence as Margot
- Hugh Wakefield as Lord Grenham
- Owen Nares as Willie
- Wallace Geoffrey as Robert Kent
- Harold Huth as Karl Van der Hyde
- Marie Lohr as Lady Frinton
- Renee Gadd as Kitty Lake
- Emily Fitzroy as Angela
- Aubrey Mather as vicar
- Rita Page as cabaret dancer
- Maud Gill
- Kathleen Harrison
- Eileen Munro
- Merle Oberon

== Reception ==
Film Weekly wrote: "A better all-round cast has seldom appeared in a British picture. But it is to Harry Lachman, more than anyone else, that Aren't We All owes its undoubted power to entertain. His direction extracts the utmost from not very promising screen material. Good light entertainment,."

Kine Weekly wrote: "Seldom has such a distinguished cast of stage artistes been seen on the screen and seldom has a British studio produced so polished, amusing, and sophisticated a film as this version of Lonsdale's play. It is in no sense of the word a 'photographed play,' on the contrary, the scope of action is wide and the plot easily and cleverly unfolded. It should enjoy a big success."
