= Ask Beccles =

1933 British film by Redd Davis

- Directed by: Redd Davis
- Starring: Garry Marsh; Lilian Oldland; Abraham Sofaer
- Production company: British and Dominions
- Distributed by: Paramount British Pictures
- Release date: December 1933
- Running time: 68 minutes
- Country: United Kingdom
- Language: English

Ask Beccles is a 1933 British comedy crime film directed by Redd Davis and starring Garry Marsh, Lilian Oldland, Abraham Sofaer and John Turnbull. The film was based on a play by Cyril Campion. It was made at British and Dominions Elstree Studios as a quota quickie for release by Paramount Pictures.

== Premise ==
A man steals a priceless diamond, but returns it when an innocent man is arrested for the theft.

== Cast ==
- Garry Marsh as Eustace Beccles
- Lilian Oldland as Marion Holforth
- Abraham Sofaer as Baki
- Allan Jeayes as Matthew Blaise
- John Turnbull as Inspector Daniels
- Evan Thomas as Sir Frederick Boyne
- Eileen Munro as Mrs. Rivers
- Fewlass Llewellyn as Sir James Holforth

== Bibliography ==
- Low, Rachael. Filmmaking in 1930s Britain. George Allen & Unwin, 1985.
- Wood, Linda. British Films, 1927-1939. British Film Institute, 1986.
