= Easy Money (1934 film) =

1934 British film by Redd Davis

- Directed by: Redd Davis
- Written by: Basil Mason
- Produced by: Redd Davis
- Starring: Lilian Oldland; Gerald Rawlinson; George Carney
- Cinematography: Geoffrey Faithfull
- Production company: British and Dominions
- Distributed by: Paramount British Pictures
- Release date: August 1934
- Running time: 69 minutes
- Country: United Kingdom
- Language: English

Easy Money is a 1934 British comedy film directed by Redd Davis and starring Lilian Oldland, Gerald Rawlinson and George Carney. It was written by Basil Mason, and was made as a quota quickie at British and Dominions Elstree Studios.

== Cast ==
- Lilian Oldland as Joan Letchworth
- Gerald Rawlinson as Jock Durant
- George Carney as Boggle
- Laurence Hanray as Mr. Pim
- Hubert Leslie as Colonel Hinckley
- Harvey Braban as Williams
- Gladys Hamer as Maggie
- René Ray as typist
- Margot Grahame

== Reception ==
Kine Weekly wrote: "Broad farce with very little point and obvious humour of unsophisticated variety. Adequate acting, but indifferent direction. Suitable mainly for quota purposes."

The Daily Film Renter wrote: "Incredible plot lacks rhyme or reason, while climax resolves into wild slapstick. Settings include bookmaker's office, pleasant rural exteriors and night club. Mary Newland only member of cast to achieve anything approaching conviction. Quota fare for very indulgent patrons. The plot of this effort is of such slender texture that it is almost impossible to set it down in cold print. Exactly what the characters are supposed to be doing is almost completely obscure."
