= The Strange Countess (novel) =

1925 novel by Edgar Wallace

- Author: Edgar Wallace
- Language: English
- Genre: Crime
- Publisher: Hodder & Stoughton
- Publication date: 1925
- Publication place: United Kingdom
- Media type: Print

The Strange Countess is a 1925 crime novel by the British writer Edgar Wallace.

== Film adaptations ==
It was the basis for the 1933 British film The Jewel and for the 1961 West German film The Strange Countess, the latter as part of a long-running series of Wallace adaptations by Rialto Film.

== Bibliography ==
- Goble, Alan. The Complete Index to Literary Sources in Film. Walter de Gruyter, 1999.
