= Secret Lives (film) =

- Brigitte Horney (right) in a scene from the film.
- Directed by: Edmond T. Gréville
- Written by: Jeffrey Dell; Edmond T. Gréville; Basil Mason; Hugh Perceval; Paul de Sainte Colombe (story)
- Produced by: Hugh Perceval
- Starring: Brigitte Horney; Neil Hamilton; Raymond Lovell
- Cinematography: Otto Heller
- Edited by: Ray Pitt
- Music by: Walter Goehr
- Production company: Phoenix Films
- Distributed by: Associated British Film Distributors
- Release date: 27 September 1937
- Running time: 79 minutes
- Country: United Kingdom
- Language: English

Secret Lives (U.S. title: I Married a Spy) is a 1937 British war drama film directed by Edmond T. Gréville and starring Brigitte Horney, Neil Hamilton and Raymond Lovell. It was written by Jeffrey Dell, Gréville, Basil Mason and Hugh Perceval based on a story by Paul de Sainte Colombe, and made at Ealing Studios by the independent Phoenix Films. The screenplay concerns a young woman who is recruited into the French secret service.

== Plot ==
At the outbreak of the First World War, a young German-born woman living in Paris is interned and then recruited into the French secret service for operations against Germany.

== Cast ==
- Brigitte Horney as Lena Schmidt
- Neil Hamilton as Lieutenant Pierre de Montmalion
- Raymond Lovell as German Secret Service Chief
- Charles Carson as Henri
- Ivor Barnard as Baldhead
- Frederick Lloyd as French Secret Service Chief
- Leslie Perrins as J 14
- Gyles Isham as Franz Abel
- Hay Petrie as Robert Pigeon
- Ben Field as Karl Schmidt
- Ralph Truman as prison guard

== Reception ==
Kine Weekly wrote: "Rather highbrow espionage melodrama, the abstract story of which mirrors the mental rather than the physical hazards which are inevitably wrapped up in the lives of Secret Service agents. The story and much of its treatment are interesting, but there is a tendency to put camera tricks before excitement and suspense. Still, although the high-faluting direction rather restricts the entertainment's appeal, it nevertheless has, in spite of its pronounced B.B.C. flavour, qualities that are entitled to the respect of the discerning."

The Daily Film Renter wrote: "Played against a realistic war-time canvas, with settings that embrace concentration camp, Intelligence headquarters, train and Swiss locations, the action moves steadily to its climax, which, incidentally, packs considerable emotional power. Direction introduces a number of telling touches that add immeasurably to the general effect."

Variety wrote: "While the motivation behind this film is commendable, the result falls far short of the intended effect. It tries to go arty in a continental way, but doesn't make the grade, either in acting, direction or photography. ... Possibly budget limitations were responsible, but picture sags and fails to come off well. It seems headed for an obscure career at the box office."
