= Death at Broadcasting House =

1934 British film by Reginald Denham

- Opening titles
- Directed by: Reginald Denham
- Screenplay by: Basil Mason
- Based on: Death at Broadcasting House by Val Gielgud and Eric Maschwitz (as Holt Marvell)
- Produced by: Hugh Perceval
- Starring: Ian Hunter; Austin Trevor; Lilian Oldland
- Cinematography: Günther Krampf
- Edited by: Reginald Beck
- Music by: Ord Hamilton
- Production company: Phoenix Films
- Distributed by: Associated British Film Distributors
- Release date: November 1934 (UK)
- Running time: 75 minutes
- Country: United Kingdom
- Language: English

Death at Broadcasting House (also known as Death at a Broadcast) is a 1934 British mystery film directed by Reginald Denham and starring Ian Hunter, Austin Trevor, Henry Kendall, and Jack Hawkins, with cameo appearances by contemporary radio personalities including Hannen Swaffer, Gillie Potter, Elisabeth Welch and Percival Mackey. It was written by Basil Mason, adapted from the 1934 novel of the same title by Val Gielgud and Eric Maschwitz (as Holt Marvell).

== Plot ==
Actor Sidney Parsons is murdered while taking part in a radio play broadcast by the BBC. When Detective-Inspector Gregory of Scotland Yard investigates, he finds that Parsons had many enemies in the cast. He decides to reconstruct the crime, with the assistance of the technicians and actors, in the hope it will lead him to identify the murderer. He succeeds in identifying the culprit.

== Cast ==
- Ian Hunter as Detective Inspector Gregory
- Austin Trevor as Leopold Dryden
- Lilian Oldland as Joan Dryden
- Henry Kendall as Rodney Fleming
- Val Gielgud as Julian Caird
- Peter Haddon as Guy Bannister
- Betty Ann Davies as Poppy Levine
- Jack Hawkins as Herbert Evans
- Donald Wolfit as Sydney Parsons
- Robert Rendel as Sir Herbert Farquharson
- Bruce Lester as Peter Ridgewell

== Reception ==
Kine Weekly wrote: "The construction of the story is such as to obscure the identity of the killer until the end, and the showmanship revealed in the employment of the B.B.C. headquarters as the stage on which the play is presented is fully rewarded in the additional interests created, all cunningly employed to strengthen the entertainment. The pace is a trifle leisurely, but the film's many issues are nevertheless firmly consolidated into an intriguing and arresting whole"

The Daily Film Renter wrote: "Murder mystery melodrama, staged against background of B.B.C. headquarters. Identity of culprit kept well hidden until ingenious climax, usual 'red herring' clues seemingly implicating numerous characters. Main interest centres on inside glimpses of Broadcasting House, and noted radio personalities who make brief appearances, Drama and comedy well knit, production values being excellent throughout. Peter Haddon tops strong cast with superb 'silly ass' portrayal."

Picturegoer wrote: "Very good murder mystery drama, familiar in theme, but novel in its application and in its settings and atmosphere. Broadcasting House has been brought most convincingly to the screen, and the atmosphere throughout is soundly realistic. ... Technical work and detail is so good – the life at Broadcasting House goes on in its accustomed manner throughout all the commotion – that one forgets that basically it is just a 'guess who' story."

== Adaptations ==
In 1935 the film was adapted for Australian radio as Murder at 2FC.
