= The Lilac Domino (film) =

- Directed by: Frederic Zelnik
- Written by: Emmerich von Gatti (libretto); Bela Jenbach (libretto); Rudolf Bernauer; Neil Gow; Richard Hutter; Basil Mason; Derek Neame
- Produced by: Lee Garmes; Isadore Goldsmith; Max Schach
- Starring: Michael Bartlett; June Knight; Fred Emney; Paul Blake
- Cinematography: Roy Clark; Bryan Langley
- Edited by: Lynn Harrison
- Music by: Charles Cuvillier (operetta); Hans May; Harry Acres
- Production company: Capitol Film Corporation
- Distributed by: United Artists Paramount British Pictures General Film Distributions
- Release date: April 1937
- Running time: 79 minutes
- Country: United Kingdom
- Language: English

The Lilac Domino is a 1937 British operetta film directed by Frederic Zelnik and starring Michael Bartlett, June Knight and Fred Emney. It was made at Welwyn Studios with sets designed by Oscar Friedrich Werndorff. It is based on the 1918 version of the operetta The Lilac Domino.

== Partial cast ==
- Michael Bartlett as Count Anatole de Karefi
- June Knight as Shari de Gonda
- Fred Emney as Baron Ladislas de Gonda
- Paul Blake as Cousin Andor de Gonda
- S.Z. Sakall as Sandor
- Richard Dolman as Steffen
- Cameron Hall as Arnim
- Athene Seyler as Mme. Alary
- Morris Harvey as Janos
- Jane Carr as Leonie
- Robert Nainby as Biro
- Joan Hickson as Katrina
- Fewlass Llewellyn as chauffeur
- Ralph Truman as doorman
- Mark Daly
- Norma Varden
- Julie Suedo

== Bibliography ==
- Low, Rachael. Filmmaking in 1930s Britain. George Allen & Unwin, 1985.
- Wood, Linda. British Films, 1927–1939. British Film Institute, 1986.
