= Gordon McLeod (actor) =

English actor (1890–1963)

- in The Saint Meets the Tiger (1943)
- Born: Charles Gordon McLeod; 27 December 1890; Market Giffard, Ivybridge, Devon, England
- Died: 16 October 1963 (aged 72); Los Angeles, California, U.S.
- Occupation: Actor
- Years active: 1919-1956

Charles Gordon McLeod (27 December 1890 – 16 October 1963) was an English actor. He was born in Market Giffard, Ivybridge, Devon.

His film appearances include Chance of a Lifetime and The Silent Passenger, but he is best known for his recurring appearance as the character Claud Eustace Teal in films such as The Saint Meets the Tiger.

== Filmography ==
- A Smart Set (1919)
- Mixed Doubles (1933)
- Brides to Be (1934)
- Borrow a Million (1934)
- The Case for the Crown (1934)
- Lucky Loser (1934)
- The Primrose Path (1934)
- The Crimson Circle (1936)
- Talk of the Devil (1936)
- Nothing Like Publicity (1936)
- The Frog (1937)
- The Squeaker (1937)
- Victoria the Great (1937)
- Dangerous Medicine (1938)
- I See Ice (1938)
- Double or Quits (1938)
- Lucky to Me (1939)
- Hoots Mon! (1940)
- That's the Ticket (1940)
- Two for Danger (1940)
- This Man Is Dangerous (1941)
- The Prime Minister (1941)
- Banana Ridge (1942)
- We'll Smile Again (1942)
- The Saint Meets the Tiger (1943)
- He Snoops to Conquer (1944)
- I Didn't Do It (1945)
- I'll Be Your Sweetheart (1945)
- Meet Sexton Blake! (1945)
- The Winslow Boy (1948)
- Floodtide (1949)
- Chance of a Lifetime (1950)
- Once a Sinner (1950)
- Four Days (1951)
- A Case for PC 49 (1951)
