= Dorice Fordred =

South African actress (1902–1980)

- in The Silent Passenger in 1935
- Born: Dorice Winifred Fordred; 25 November 1902; Port Elizabeth, Cape Colony (today in South Africa)
- Died: 4 August 1980 (aged 77); London, England
- Years active: 1928-1955

Dorice Fordred (25 November 1902 – 4 August 1980) was a South African actress, best known for character parts and Shakespearean roles on the London stage. The Brooklyn Daily Eagle commented in 1931, "She is one of those rare things, a young and attractive character actress."

== Early life ==
Dorice Fordred was born and raised near Port Elizabeth, Cape Colony. She went to England to study theatre. "Living on the veldt gives you – you can't help it, no matter who you are – a susceptibility to simple, earthy rhythms," she explained to an American interviewer in 1931.

== Career ==
Dorice Fordred spent most of her career on the London stage, where she debuted in 1923 and appeared regularly in the 1920s and 1930s. London productions featuring Fordred in the cast included The Two Gentlemen of Verona (1923); Troilus & Cressida (1923); The School for Scandal (1923–24); Faust (1924); The Taming of the Shrew (1924); A Midsummer Night's Dream (1924); Everyman (1925); Hamlet (1925); Macbeth (1925); Twelfth Night (1925); Riverside Nights (1926); The Widowing of Mrs. Holroyd (1926); Trelawney of the Wells (1926-1927); Thunder on the Left (1928); Some Showers (1928); The Iron Law (1929); Murder on the Second Floor (1929-1930); Love's Labour Lost (1930); Debonair (1930); Getting Rid of Gertie (1930); Cynara (1930–31); Three Flats (1931); The Force of Circumstance (1931); Musical Chairs (1932); Half-Holiday (1932); Earthquake in Surrey (1932); Francis Thompson (1933); Bellairs (1933); A Sleeping Clergyman (1933); Viceroy Sarah (1934); Summer's Lease (1935); Othello (1924 and 1935); King Lear (1936); Sonata (1936); The Ante-Room (1936); Adults Only (1939); We At the Crossroads (1939).

Dorice Fordred also appeared in films, including Blue Bottles and Daydreams (both 1928), both short films, now lost, based in stories by H. G. Wells, and both starring Elsa Lanchester and Charles Laughton; The Silent Passenger (1935); As You Like It (1936), starring Laurence Olivier; Knight Without Armour (1937), starring Marlene Dietrich; The Nursemaid Who Disappeared (1939); Stolen Life (1939); John Smith Wakes Up (1940); and The Skin Game (1951). On Broadway, she had one credit, for Payment Deferred (1931), again with Elsa Lanchester and Charles Laughton as fellow cast members.

== Personal life ==
Fordred died in 1980, in London, aged 77 years.
