= Hugh Perceval =

British screenwriter and film producer (1908–1987)

- Born: 18 February 1908
- Died: July 1987 (aged 79); Beaconsfield, Buckinghamshire, United Kingdom
- Occupations: Writer, producer
- Years active: 1931–1970

Hugh Perceval (18 February 1908 – July 1987) was a British screenwriter and film producer. He was portrayed by Michael Kitchen in the 2011 film My Week with Marilyn, which chronicles the filming of The Prince and the Showgirl (1957), whose production Perceval managed.

== Filmography ==
=== Producer ===
- After Dark (1933)
- The Jewel (1933)
- Death at Broadcasting House (1934)
- The Silent Passenger (1935)
- Calling the Tune (1936)
- The House of the Spaniard (1936)
- Secret Lives (1937, also screenwriter)
- Brief Ecstasy (1937)
- What a Man! (1938)
- Garrison Follies (1940)
- Danny Boy (1941)
- The Missing Million (1942)
- Front Line Kids (1942)
- The Third Man (1949)
- Outcast of the Islands (1951)
- Home at Seven (1952)
- Who Goes There! (1952)
- The Ringer (1952)
- The Holly and the Ivy (1952)
- The Man Between (1953)
- Three Cases of Murder (1955)
- The Man Who Loved Redheads (1955)
- Raising a Riot (1955, also screenwriter)
- The Deep Blue Sea (1955)
- Carve Her Name with Pride (1958)
- The World of Suzie Wong (1960)
- The Third Secret (1964)
- The Reckoning (1970)

=== Production Manager ===
- Jamaica Inn (1939)
- Night Beat (1947)
- The Fallen Idol (1948)
- The Prince and the Showgirl (1957)

=== Screenwriter ===
- These Charming People (1931)
- A Man of Mayfair (1931)
- Secret Lives (1937)
- Raising a Riot (1955)

== Bibliography ==
- Landy, Marcia. British Genres: Cinema and Society, 1930-1960. Princeton University Press, 2014.
