= Perfect Understanding =

- Film poster
- Directed by: Cyril Gardner
- Written by: Miles Malleson; Michael Powell
- Produced by: Gloria Swanson
- Starring: Gloria Swanson; Laurence Olivier; John Halliday
- Cinematography: Curt Courant
- Edited by: Thorold Dickinson
- Music by: Henry Sullivan
- Production company: Gloria Swanson British Productions
- Distributed by: United Artists
- Release date: 24 February 1933
- Running time: 80 minutes
- Country: United Kingdom
- Language: English

Perfect Understanding is a 1933 British comedy film directed by Cyril Gardner and starring Gloria Swanson, Laurence Olivier and John Halliday. The film was an independent production made at Ealing Studios, conceived as an attempt to revive Swanson's career which had suffered following the conversion to sound films.

== Plot ==
Judy and Nicholas Randall are a newly married couple who agree to a marriage based on "perfect understanding." This agreement is meant to rule out any form of jealousy. During their honeymoon they are called away to Cannes to spend time with their friends. Judy chooses to go back to London to decorate their home but insists that Nicholas spend time with their friends. While in Cannes, Nicholas becomes drunk and ends up sleeping with Stephanie, his former mistress. Nicholas is guilt-stricken and immediately returns home and confesses to Judy his sin. Judy forgives him due to their prior agreement of a perfect understanding. However, while Nicholas is away on business she confesses to her friend Ivan that she is still upset with Nicholas. Ivan then declare his love for Judy and tells her that if she would like, he would be willing to spend the night with her. Judy leaves Ivan to consider her options and ends up wandering the streets at night. Meanwhile, Nicholas has been outside Ivan's apartment and does not realize that Judy has left. He concludes that the two are having an affair. When Judy returns from walking the streets she leaves a letter for Ivan, thanking him for his love.

When she arrives home, she is confronted by Nicholas who accuses her of an affair. She denies this and an argument ensues. Nicholas later drives to Ivan's apartment and finds the letter. He and Judy eventually separate. A month later, Judy finds that she is pregnant. She informs Nicholas who questions whether the baby is his. Angrily, she declares that their marriage is over and chooses to initiate divorce proceedings.

Nicholas is distraught over his failed relationship with Judy and confers with his lawyer over preventing the divorce. Unfortunately, due to Nicholas's infidelity the judge will grant the divorce for Judy unless he can prove that Judy was also unfaithful. During the court proceedings, Nicholas' lawyer displays her letter to Ivan. The judge dismisses the divorce due to the appearance of Judy's unfaithfulness. Afterward, Nicholas tells Judy he believes her and the couple promise to make amends and create a new life together.

== Cast ==
- Gloria Swanson as Judy
- Laurence Olivier as Nicholas Randall
- John Halliday as Ivan Ronnson
- Nigel Playfair as Lord Portleigh
- Michael Farmer as George
- Genevieve Tobin as Kitty
- Charles Cullum as Sir John Fitzmaurice
- Nora Swinburne as Lady Stephanie Fitzmaurice
- Peter Gawthorne as Butler
- Charles Childerstone as Judy's Counsel
