= Calling the Tune =

1936 British film by Reginald Denham

- Directed by: Reginald Denham
- Written by: Basil Mason; Reginald Denham
- Produced by: Hugh Perceval
- Starring: Adele Dixon; Sally Gray; Sam Livesey
- Cinematography: Franz Weihmayr
- Edited by: Thorold Dickinson; Ray Pitt
- Production company: Phoenix Films
- Distributed by: Associated British Film Distributors
- Release date: 7 July 1936
- Running time: 80 minutes
- Country: United Kingdom
- Language: English

Calling the Tune is a 1936 British musical drama film directed by Reginald Denham and Thorold Dickinson and starring Adele Dixon, Sally Gray and Sam Livesey. The screenplay was by Basil Mason based on the 1913 play of the same title by Irish MP and novelist Justin Huntly McCarthy.

== Cast ==
- Adele Dixon as Julia Harbord
- Sally Gray as Margaret Gordon
- Sam Livesey as Bob Gordon
- Eliot Makeham as Stephen Harbord
- Donald Wolfit as Dick Finlay
- Clifford Evans as Peter Mallory
- Lewis Casson as John Mallory
- Ronald Simpson as Bramwell
- H. F. Maltby as Stubbins
- Robb Wilton as Jenkins
- Reginald Forsyth as himself
- Charles Penrose as himself
- George Robey as himself
- Students of the R.A.D.A. as themselves
- Sir Henry Wood as himself
- Pat Fitzpatrick as boy
- Cedric Hardwicke as himself

== Production ==
The film was made at Ealing Studios with sets designed by the art director R. Holmes Paul.

== Reception ==
The Monthly Film Bulletin wrote: "The attempt to mix melodrama and inside views of a gramophone factory fails, and neither aspect is adequately treated. The fictional story spreads over the long period from the infancy of the gramophone to the present day and suggests that this period has been one of trickery, theft and the exploitation of the technical by the commercial man. Production and acting are unpretentious and adequate."
