= The Officers' Mess =

1931 film

- Directed by: Manning Haynes
- Written by: Sydney Blow (play); Douglas Hoare (play); Eliot Stannard
- Produced by: Harry Rowson
- Starring: Richard Cooper; Harold French; Elsa Lanchester
- Cinematography: Basil Emmott
- Production company: Harry Rowson Productions
- Distributed by: Paramount British Pictures
- Release date: 15 May 1931
- Running time: 98 minutes
- Country: United Kingdom
- Language: English

The Officers' Mess is a 1931 British comedy film directed by Manning Haynes and starring Richard Cooper, Harold French and Elsa Lanchester. It was written by Eliot Stannard based on the play by Sydney Blow and Douglas Hoare, and was made at Walton Studios. It was released as a quota quickie by Paramount Pictures.

A Lieutenant becomes mixed-up with some stolen jewels.

== Preservation status ==
The British Film Institute National Archive holds a collection of ephemera and stills but no film or video materials.

== Cast ==
- Richard Cooper as Tony Turnbull
- Harold French as Budge Harbottle
- Elsa Lanchester as Cora Melville
- Lilian Oldland as Kitty
- Max Avieson as Bolton
- Margery Binner as Phoebe
- George Bellamy as Inspector Bedouin
- Annie Esmond as Mrs. Makepiece
- Fewlass Llewellyn as Adm. Harbottle
- Helen Haye as Mrs. Harbottle
- Faith Bennett as Ann Telford
- Gordon Begg

== Reception ==
Film Weekly wrote: "If you are willing to make allowances for too much talk of the frothy, very British kind, you will be entertained by this bright comedy. ... This picture is well handled by Manning Haynes, who has obtained the best value from a rather diffuse story. The cast is good, Richard Cooper and Elsa Lanchester being especially effective."

Kine Weekly wrote: "Familiar bedroom farce adapted from the well-known stage play, which is a very amateurish affair and is seldom funny. ... Richard Cooper is fairly good as Tony, but employs hesitancy of speech with such frequency that it becomes irritating. Harold French is adequate as Budge, but both Elsa Lanchester and Mary Newland are weak as Cora and Kitty respectively."
