= The House of the Spaniard =

1935 film by Reginald Denham

- Brigitte Horney and Peter Haddon in a still image of the film
- Directed by: Reginald Denham
- Written by: Arthur Behrend, The House of the Spaniard (novel); Basil Mason
- Produced by: Hugh Perceval
- Starring: Peter Haddon; Brigitte Horney; Jean Galland; Allan Jeayes
- Cinematography: Franz Weihmayr
- Music by: Allan Gray
- Production company: Phoenix Films
- Distributed by: Associated British
- Release date: November 1936
- Running time: 71 minutes
- Country: United Kingdom
- Language: English

The House of the Spaniard is a 1936 British comedy thriller film directed by Reginald Denham and starring Peter Haddon, Brigitte Horney and Allan Jeayes. It is set in Lancashire and Spain, during the ongoing Spanish Civil War. It was shot at Ealing Studios in west London, England, and on location in Lancashire and Spain. Art direction was by Holmes Paul. It was based on a novel of the same title by Arthur Behrend, which was published in 1935.

== Plpt ==
An unemployed and seemingly dull-witted young man named David Grey stays with his friend Johnny Gilchrist in Liverpool while he looks for work. Due to a mistake, he is hired by a Spanish-owned shipping company whose owner "Don" Pedro de Guzman lives in a lonely, mysterious house in the marshes outside Liverpool. Grey's curiosity is aroused by the unexplained death of a man whom he had spoken to on the marshes, close to the house. His investigations lead to his abduction and detention on one of Guzman's steamers, which takes to Spain where he becomes embroiled in an attempted revolution in Spain, which fails. He is eventually able to escape thanks to the help of Guzman's daughter, Margarita.

== Cast ==
- Brigitte Horney as Margarita de Guzman
- Peter Haddon as David Grey
- Jean Galland as Ignacio
- Allan Jeayes as Don Pedro de Guzman
- Gyles Isham as John Gilchrist
- Hay Petrie as Orlando
- Ivor Barnard as Mott
- Minnie Rayner as Mrs. Blossom
- Gibson Gowland as 1st Captain
- David Horne as 2nd Captain
- Ernest Jay
- Charles Lloyd-Pack as Man in train
- Fred O'Donovan as McNail
- Abraham Sofaer as Vidal

== Bibliography ==
- Chibnall, Steve (16 January 2007). Quota Quickies: The British of the British 'B' Film. British Film Institute. ISBN 978-1-84457-155-0 – via Internet Archive.
- Low, Rachael (1985). Film Making in 1930s Britain. George Allen & Unwin. ISBN 978-0-04-791042-5.
- Wood, Linda (December 1986). British Films: 1927-1939. Bloomsbury Academic, British Film Institute. ISBN 978-0-85170-189-9.
