= The Silent Passenger =

- Opening titles
- Directed by: Reginald Denham
- Written by: Basil Mason
- Based on: a story by Dorothy L. Sayers
- Produced by: Hugh Perceval
- Starring: John Loder; Peter Haddon
- Cinematography: Jan Stallich
- Edited by: Thorold Dickinson
- Music by: Percival Mackey
- Release date: 11 November 1935 (UK)
- Running time: 54 minutes 9 seconds
- Country: United Kingdom
- Language: English

The Silent Passenger is a 1935 British black-and-white mystery film directed by Reginald Denham and starring John Loder, Peter Haddon and Lilian Oldland. It was written by Basil Mason based on an original story written by Dorothy L. Sayers specifically for the screen. It was produced at Ealing Studios, London.

== Plot ==
Maurice Windermere, a blackmailer, is absconding to France with Mollie Ryder, one of his victims. While waiting for the train to take them to the cross Channel ferry, he is murdered by the husband of another one of his victims, railway detective Henry Camberley. Bridge engineer John Ryder, Mollie's husband, jealously searching for her, breaks into Windermere's room just after Camberley has killed Windermere and hidden him in a trunk.

Ryder assaults Camberley, who he assumes is Windermere, and demands the tickets Windermere purchased for himself and Mollie, intending to surprise his wife by taking Windermere's place on the trip abroad. Camberley places the trunk containing Windermere's body with Windermere's other luggage, which Ryder obligingly takes with him on his journey to France.

Windermere's body is discovered in Windermere's trunk when Ryder, using Windermere's tickets, attempts to go through French customs. The French police assume he murdered the rival for his wife's affections and return him to England by the next ferry. Fortunately for Ryder, amateur detective Lord Peter Wimsey, who already suspected Windermere of blackmail, followed Windermere's trail onto the boat train where he struck up an acquaintance with Mollie and John Ryder. Back in England Lord Peter sets about proving his newfound friend's innocence, using Ryder as "bait" to flush out the real killer and solve the murder.

== Cast ==
- John Loder as John Ryder
- Peter Haddon as Lord Peter Wimsey
- Lilian Oldland as Mollie Ryder (billed as Mary Newland)
- Donald Wolfit as Henry Camberley
- Austin Trevor as Chief Inspector Parker
- Leslie Perrins as Maurice Windermere
- Aubrey Mather as Bunter
- Robb Wilton as porter
- Ralph Truman as Saunders
- Ann Codrington as desk clerk
- George De Warfaz as Chief of French Police
- Annie Esmond as old lady passenger with Pekinese dogs
- Dorice Fordred as Camberley's accomplice
- Vincent Holman as works manager
- Gordon McLeod as Commissioner
- Frederick Burtwell (uncredited)
- Percy Rhodes (uncredited)

== Reception ==
The Daily Film Renter wrote: "Crisply directed, splendidly staged and well acted, with Peter Haddon scoring as nobleman detective. Excellent popular entertainment."

Kine Weekly wrote: "Rousing railroad melodrama with an ingenious crime motif, glorious comedy relief, and spectacular thrills framed in realistic atmosphere. Not only does the plot itself reveal arresting dramatic invention, but it makes generous provision for comprehensive by-play. Every link in the human and exciting chain is fashioned with resourceful technical skill, and each, thanks to enthusiastic team work, carries the hallmark of capital popular entertainment. It is great stuff, a proposition of box-office dimensions for young and old alike, and every member of the family."

Picturegoer wrote: "An extremely well-made detective drama, novel in plot, ingenious in solution, and seasoned throughout with a real sense of humour. The production, as a whole, is unpretentious and there are minor flaws in construction, particularly in the opening; but it does achieve what it sets out to do – to entertain first and last, and all the time."

== Home media ==
The film was released on DVD in 2008 by Sinister Cinema.
