= Mary Newland =

English actress (1903–1984)

- in The Silent Passenger (1935)
- Born: Lilian Mary Oldland; 7 February 1903; Gloucester, England
- Died: 29 September 1984 (aged 81); Brighton and Hove, England
- Years active: 1925–1935
- Spouse(s): Reginald Denham; Edward Percy Smith

Lilian Mary Oldland (later Newland, 7 February 1903 – 29 September 1984) was an English actress who appeared in more than twenty films between 1925 and 1935.

== Biography ==
Born in Gloucester in 1903, she made her film debut in The Secret Kingdom and was soon cast as a regular in the Bindle Series of films. In 1930 she changed her name to Mary Newland and was credited as that thereafter. She made her last film, The Silent Passenger, in 1935.

She was married to the actor Reginald Denham, and later to MP and playwright Edward Percy Smith.

== Selected filmography ==
- The Flag Lieutenant (1926)
- The Further Adventures of the Flag Lieutenant (1927)
- A Daughter in Revolt (1927)
- Virginia's Husband (1928)
- Troublesome Wives (1928)
- The City of Youth (1928)
- To Oblige a Lady (1931)
- The Officers' Mess (1931)
- Jealousy (1931)
- Ask Beccles (1933)
- The Jewel (1933)
- Easy Money (1934)
- Death at Broadcasting House (1934)
- The Price of Wisdom (1935)
- The Silent Passenger (1935)
- The Small Man (1936)
