= The Trygon Factor =

1966 British–West German film by Cyril Frankel

- Directed by: Cyril Frankel
- Written by: Derry Quinn; Stanley Munro based on a novel by Edgar Wallace
- Produced by: Ian Warren; Horst Wendlandt
- Starring: Stewart Granger; Susan Hampshire; Robert Morley
- Cinematography: Harry Waxman
- Edited by: Oswald Hafenrichter
- Music by: Peter Thomas
- Production company: Rialto Film
- Distributed by: J. Arthur Rank Film Distributors (UK); Warner Bros.-Seven Arts (US); Constantin Film (West Germany)
- Release dates: December 1966 (West Germany); May 1967 (UK)
- Running time: 88 minutes
- Countries: United Kingdom; West Germany
- Languages: English, German
- Box office: 73,066 admissions (France); 605,412 admissions (Spain); 1.6 million (West Germany)

The Trygon Factor (German title: Das Geheimnis der weißen Nonne / Mystery of the White Nun) is a 1966 British-West German crime film directed by Cyril Frankel and starring Stewart Granger, Susan Hampshire and Robert Morley. It is based on the 1917 Edgar Wallace novel Kate Plus Ten.

== Plot ==
A Scotland Yard inspector is called to investigate a series of unsolved robberies. Inspector Cooper-Smith arrives at the country manor of a respectable English family. He discovers Livia Emberday, the mistress of the house, has turned to crime in order to bolster the family's flagging fortunes. With assistance from an order of bogus nuns, stolen goods end up in the warehouse of Hamlyn, purportedly a respectable businessman.

== Cast ==
- Stewart Granger as Superintendent Cooper-Smith
- Susan Hampshire as Trudy Emberday
- Robert Morley as Hubert Hamlyn
- Cathleen Nesbitt as Livia Emberday
- Brigitte Horney as Sister General
- Sophie Hardy as Sophie
- Diane Clare as Clare O'Connor (Sister Clare)
- James Robertson Justice as Sir John (voice: English version)
- Siegfried Schürenberg as Sir John – German version
- Eddi Arent as Emil Clossen
- James Culliford as Luke Emberday
- Allan Cuthbertson as Detective Thompson
- Colin Gordon as Dice
- Caroline Blakiston as white nun
- Richardina Jackson as black nun

== Production ==
Susan Hampshire called the film "another B picture. Very often I did films because of tax demands" and said Stewart Granger had a big ego, but felt "we had a very interesting director in that film, Cyril Frankley [sic!], and I think it was one of the best acting performances I've ever given."

Filmink called the movie "one of several thrillers made by Rank that were co-productions partly shot in Europe using international 'names'."

== Release ==
The film premiered in West Germany on 16 December 1966.

== Critical reception ==
The Monthly Film Bulletin wrote: "Take one of England's statelier homes, serving as headquarters for a ruthless criminal conspiracy by a sisterhood of nuns engaged in smuggling, bank-robbery and murder; add a matriarch behaving like a genteel Doctor Mabuse, whose son is kinky for French girls' blonde hair, and whose daughter displays marked transvestite tendencies; throw in Robert Morley pouting petulantly, and you should have the ingredients for an entertaining thriller. Apparently you don't. The film is confused, rambling, and almost entirely lacking in humour or real tension. However, it is mostly agreeable to look at, thanks to the photography and art direction. Susan Hampshire and James Culliford adequately portray mental imbalance, and there is an excellent performance by Cathleen Nesbitt, of whom one would happily have seen much more."

The Radio Times called it a "farcical British crime drama."

Variety noted, "a complicated Scotland Yard whodunit which the spectator will find taxing to follow ... Script is pocketed with story loopholes and attempts to confuse, plus certain motivations and bits of business impossible to fathom. Granger still makes a good impression."

Allmovie wrote, "there are plenty of twists in the storyline of this often complex mystery feature."

== Soundtrack ==
The soundtrack composed by Peter Thomas was released in 1968 on a library music LP Jazz Graphics / The Spy Set (KPM 1042) without any reference to the film. Parts of the soundtrack can be found on the 2000 CD – Peter Thomas – Kriminalfilmmusik (Prudence 398.6533.2).
