= Charles Cullum =

British actor (1899–1979)

- in It's Not Cricket (1949)
- Born: Robert Perry Cullum; 8 March 1899; Barry Docks, Wales
- Died: 26 May 1979 (aged 90); Lewes, Sussex, England
- Occupation: Actor
- Years active: 1920–1971 (film and TV)

Charles Cullum (8 March 1899 – 26 May 1979) was a British stage and film actor.

On 29 December 1930 Mary Ellen Chaddock, a popular British magazine model, reportedly committed suicide after learning Cullum had married in New York. At the time he was touring the United States playing Captain Stanhope in the British war drama Journey's End. Cullum would later state that there was never a hint of engagement between him and Chaddock.

== Filmography ==
| Year | Title | Role | Notes |
|---|---|---|---|
| 1920 | The Children of Gibeon | Jack Conyers | |
| 1932 | Self Made Lady | Lord Max Mariven | |
| 1933 | Perfect Understanding | Sir John Fitzmaurice | |
| 1934 | To Be a Lady | Dudley Chalfont | |
| 1934 | William Tell | Arnold Melchthal | |
| 1934 | Borrow a Million | Michael Trent | |
| 1935 | D'Ye Ken John Peel? | | |
| 1948 | Bonnie Prince Charlie | Sir John MacDonald | Uncredited |
| 1949 | It's Not Cricket | Sir Leslie Lawson | |
| 1949 | The Chiltern Hundreds | Colonel | |
| 1949 | A Run for Your Money | Powerful Man | Uncredited |
| 1951 | The Man in the White Suit | 1st Company Director | |
| 1957 | Barnacle Bill | Maj. Kent | |
| 1958 | The Reluctant Debutante | English Colonel | Uncredited |
| 1961 | The President | Sir Merryl Lloyd | |
| 1971 | Games That Lovers Play | Charles | (final film role) |

== Bibliography ==
- Ian Christie & Andrew Moor. Michael Powell: International Perspectives on an English Film-maker. British Film Institute, 2005.
