= Robert Rendel =

British actor (1884–1944)

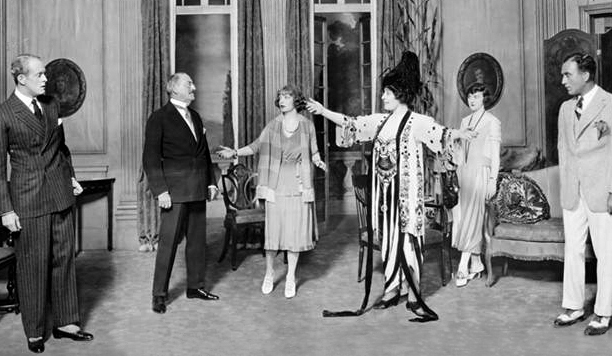
- Robert Rendel (left) with John Drew, Estelle Winwood, Mrs. Leslie Carter, Maxine MacDonald and John Halliday in the Broadway production of W. Somerset Maugham's The Circle (1921)
- Born: 2 December 1884; St Mary Abbots Kensington, London, England
- Died: 9 May 1944 (aged 59); Marylebone, London, England
- Occupation: Actor

Robert Rendel (2 December 1884 in St Mary Abbots Kensington, London – 9 May 1944 in Marylebone, London) was a British actor of stage, screen, television and radio.

== Career ==
His stage work included roles in the original Broadway productions of Somerset Maugham's The Circle in 1921, and Arnold Ridley's The Ghost Train in 1926. In 1935 he played the Duke of Marlborough in Norman Ginsbury's Viceroy Sarah. On film, he played Sherlock Holmes in the original sound version of The Hound of the Baskervilles in 1932.

== Filmography ==
- Slander (1916) as Harry Carson
- The Barricade (1917) as Gerald Hastings
- Her Night of Romance (1924) as Prince George
- The Hound of the Baskervilles (1932) as Sherlock Holmes
- Death at Broadcasting House (1934) as Sir Herbert Farquharson
- The Way of Youth (1934) as Sir Peter Marmon
- Borrow a Million (1934) as Struthers
- The Price of Wisdom (1935) as Alfred Blake
- Twice Branded (1936) as Charles Hamilton
- The Crimson Circle (1936) as Commissioner
- Fire Over England (1937) as Don Miguel
- The Dark Stairway (1938) as Dr. Fletcher
- The Four Feathers (1939) as Colonel
- The Spy in Black (1939) as Admiral
- The Lion Has Wings (1939) as Chief of Air Staff
- Ten Days in Paris (1940) as Sir James Stevens
- Sailors Three (1940) as British Captain
- The Day Will Dawn (1942) as Captain of Destroyer
