= One Summer's Day =

- Directed by: Frank Goodenough Bayly
- Written by: H.V. Esmond (play and screenplay)
- Starring: Fay Compton; Owen Nares; Sam Livesey
- Production company: British Actors Film Company
- Distributed by: International Exclusives
- Release date: June 1917
- Running time: 4 reels
- Country: United Kingdom
- Languages: Silent; English intertitles

One Summer's Day is a 1917 British silent drama film directed by Frank Goodenough Bayly and starring Fay Compton, Owen Nares and Sam Livesey.

== Cast ==
- Fay Compton as Maisie
- Owen Nares as Captain Dick Rudyard
- Sam Livesey as Philip Marsden
- Eva Westlake as Chiana
- A.G. Poulton
- Caleb Porter
- Roy Royston
- Gwendoline Jesson

== Bibliography ==
- Goble, Alan. The Complete Index to Literary Sources in Film. Walter de Gruyter, 1999.
