= Gerald Rawlinson =

British actor (1904–1975)

Gerald Rawlinson (1904–1975) was a British actor.

== Selected filmography ==
- The Hellcat (1928)
- Life's a Stage (1928)
- The Rising Generation (1928)
- Young Woodley (1928)
- The Silent House (1929)
- The Devil's Maze (1929)
- Alf's Carpet (1929)
- The Night Porter (1930)
- Young Woodley (1931)
- Creeping Shadows (1931)
- Tell England (1931)
- Dangerous Seas (1931)
- Brown Sugar (1931)
- The Man at Six (1931)
- The Old Man (1931)
- Threads (1932)
- The Call Box Mystery (1932)
- Collision (1932)
- Sleepless Nights (1933)
- Excess Baggage (1933)
- Daughters of Today (1933)
- You Made Me Love You (1933)
- Easy Money (1934)
- Say It with Diamonds (1935)
- When the Devil Was Well (1937)
- His Lordship Regrets (1938)
