= Abraham Sofaer =

British actor (1896–1988)

- Sofaer in a 1966 episode of Mission: Impossible
- Born: Abraham Isaac Sofaer; 1 October 1896; Rangoon, British Burma
- Died: 21 January 1988 (aged 91); Woodland Hills, Los Angeles, California, U.S.
- Occupation: Actor
- Years active: 1921-1974
- Spouse: Angela Psyche Christian (m. 1920)
- Children: 5

Abraham Isaac Sofaer (1 October 1896 – 21 January 1988) was a British actor. He began his career on stage and became a familiar supporting player in film and on television in his later years.

== Early life and education ==
Sofaer was born in Rangoon, Burma (present-day Yangon, Myanmar) — then a part of the British Empire. His father was Isaac Sofaer, a successful architect and merchant of Baghdadi Jewish origin (who established the Sofaer Building, Rangoon, which still stands today), who had emigrated to British Burma from Iraq as a child.

Sofaer was educated locally at the Diocesan Boys' High School. His education continued in England, and he initially worked as a school teacher in Rangoon and later in London.

== Career ==
He began his acting career on the London stage in 1921, but soon he was alternating between theatre productions in London and New York. He appeared in the 1933 musical He Wanted Adventure. In 1935, he gained widespread attention on Broadway portraying Prime Minister Benjamin Disraeli in Victoria Regina.

During the 1930s, he appeared in both British and American films. Among his prominent performances were his dual role as the Judge and Surgeon in Powell and Pressburger's A Matter of Life and Death (1946) and as Saint Paul in Quo Vadis (1951).

He also appeared on television from its early days in the late 1930s and on radio, including a small part in Dorothy L. Sayers' The Man Born to Be King.

Although his film appearances diminished after the 1950s, he had guest roles on dozens of major U.S. television series throughout the 1960s. He made three appearances on Perry Mason, including as Dr. Maitland in “The Case of the Deadly Double” (1958), Sylvester Robey in the 1960 episode "The Case of the Crying Cherub", and defendant Elihu Laban in the 1963 episode "The Case of the Two-Face Turnabout". His voice was featured in two episodes of Star Trek.

Other guest appearances were in Wagon Train, Gunsmoke, The Twilight Zone, The Investigators, Daniel Boone, The Time Tunnel, Lost in Space, and The Outer Limits. He may be best remembered for his recurring role as Haji, the master of all genies, on I Dream of Jeannie or as the swami who in the sauna scene in The Monkees' 1968 film Head.

== Personal life ==
Sofaer was the first cousin, once removed, of American jurist Abraham David Sofaer.

=== Death ===
Sofaer died at the Motion Picture & Television Country House and Hospital in Woodland Hills, California, as the result of congestive heart failure in 1988, aged 91.

== Complete filmography ==
- Dreyfus (1931) - Dubois
- The House Opposite (1932) - Fahmy
- Stamboul (1932) - Mahmed Pasha
- The Flying Squad (1932) - Li Yoseph
- Insult (1932) - Ali Ben Achmed
- The Flag Lieutenant (1933) - Meheti Salos
- Long Live the King (1933, Short) - Alexis
- Karma (1933) - Holy Man
- The Wandering Jew (1933) - Zapportas
- Trouble (1933) - Ali
- Little Miss Nobody (1933) - Mr. Beal
- High Finance (1933) - Myers
- Ask Beccles (1933) - Baki
- Oh No Doctor! (1934) - Skelton
- Nell Gwynn (1934) (uncredited)
- The Admiral's Secret (1934) - Don Pablo y Gonzales
- The Private Life of Don Juan (1934) - Street Bookseller (uncredited)
- Things to Come (1936) - Wadsky (uncredited)
- The House of the Spaniard (1936) - Vidal
- Rembrandt (1936) - Dr. Menasseh
- The Switchback (1939, TV Movie)
- Caesar's Friend (1939, TV Movie) - Annas
- The Deacon and the Jewess (1939, TV Movie) - Benedict the Pointer, Jew of Oxford
- The Great Adventure (1939, TV Movie) - Ebag
- Freedom Radio (1941) - Heini
- The Prime Minister (1941) - Turkish ambassador (uncredited)
- Crook's Tour (1941) - Ali
- The Queen of Spades (1946, TV Movie) - Tchekalinsky
- The Man with the Cloak Full of Holes (1946, TV Movie) - Luis de Santángel
- A Matter of Life and Death (1946) - The Judge
- Caesar's Friend (1947, TV Movie) - Joseph Caiaphas
- The Merchant of Venice (1947, TV Movie, aired on two days) - Shylock
- Dual Alibi (1947) - French Judge
- Trilby (1947, TV Movie) - Svengali
- The Ghosts of Berkeley Square (1947) - Benjamin Disraeli
- Dim'at Ha'Nehamah Ha'Gedolah (1947) - Corporal / Commentator: Jordan's Tale
- Calling Paul Temple (1948) - Dr. Kohima
- Tilly of Bloomsbury (1948, TV Movie) - Mehta Ram
- Counsellor at Law (1949, TV Movie) - George Simon
- A Man's House (1949, TV Movie) - Salathiel
- The Gentle People (1949, TV Movie) - Jonah Goodman
- Christopher Columbus (1949) - Luis de Santángel
- The Squeaker (1949, TV Movie) - Lew Friedman
- Dick Whittington (1949, TV Movie) - Sultan
- Cairo Road (1950) - Commandant
- Pandora and the Flying Dutchman (1951) - Judge
- Quo Vadis (1951) - Paul the Apostle
- Judgment Deferred (1952) - Chancellor
- Music at Night (1952, TV Movie) - Nicholas Lengel
- His Majesty O'Keefe (1954) - Fatumak, Medicine Man
- The Naked Jungle (1954) - Incacha
- Elephant Walk (1954) - Appuhamy
- Out of the Clouds (1955) - The Indian
- Bhowani Junction (1956) - Surabhai
- The First Texan (1956) - Don Carlos
- Omar Khayyam (1957) - Tutush
- The Story of Mankind (1957) - Indian Chief
- The Sad Sack (1957) - Hassim
- Song Without End (1960) - Emissary in Rome (uncredited)
- Hitler (1962) - Morris Kaplan
- Taras Bulba (1962) - Abbot
- Captain Sindbad (1963) - Galgo
- Twice-Told Tales (1963) - Professor Pietro Baglioni
- 4 for Texas (1963) - Pulaski
- The Greatest Story Ever Told (1965) - Joseph of Arimathaea
- Journey to the Center of Time (1967) - Dr. 'Doc' Gordon
- Head (1968) - Swami
- Che! (1969) - Pablo Rojas
- Justine (1969) - Proprietor
- Chisum (1970) - Chief White Buffalo

== Selected television appearances ==
- Perry Mason (1958, Season 1, Episode 24: "The Case of the Deadly Double") — Dr. Maitland
- Wagon Train (1958, Season 2, Episode 7: "The Bije Wilcox Story") — Bull Man
- Zane Grey Theatre (1959, Season 4, Episode 7: "Mission") — Comanche Chief Alou
- The Real McCoys (1959, Season 2, Episode 21: "The Rainmaker") — Arapaho Chief
- Wagon Train (1959, Season 3, Episode 1: "The Stagecoach Story") — Antonio DeVargo
- Gunsmoke (1960, Season 5, Episode 24: "Kitty's Killing") — Jeremiah Leech
- The Twilight Zone (1960, Season 1, Episode 35: "The Mighty Casey") — Dr. Stillman
- Perry Mason (1960, Season 3, Episode 29: "The Case of the Crying Cherub") — Sylvester Robey
- Thriller (1960, Season 1, Episode 10: "The Prediction") — Gus Kostopulos
- Alfred Hitchcock Presents (1961, Season 6, Episode 14: "The Changing Heart") — Ulrich Klemm
- Peter Gunn (1961, Season 3, Episode 26: "A Penny Saved") — Boris Petrov
- Thriller (1961, Season 2, Episode 4: "The Weird Tailor") — Nicolai
- Rawhide (1961, Season 4, Episode 5: "The Lost Tribe") — Little Hawk
- Gunsmoke (1962, Season 7, Episode 15: "The Do-Badder") — Harvey Easter
- The Alfred Hitchcock Hour (1962, Season 1, Episode 2: "Don't Look Behind You") — Dr. MacFarlane
- Perry Mason (1963, Season 6, Episode 18: "The Case of the Two-Faced Turn-a-Bout") — Elihu Laban
- The Alfred Hitchcock Hour (1964, Season 2, Episode 14: "Beyond the Sea of Death") — Dr. R.D. Shankara
- Outer Limits (1964, Season 2, Episode 5: "Demon with a Glass Hand") — Arch
- Star Trek: The Original Series (1966, Season 1, Episode 2: "Charlie X") — The Thasian
- The Man from U.N.C.L.E. (1965, Season 1, Episode 23: "The Brain-Killer Affair") — Mr. Gabhail Samoy
- The Time Tunnel (1966, Season 1, Episode 7: "Revenge of the Gods") — Epeios
- The Time Tunnel (1967, Season 1, Episode 20: "The Walls of Jericho") — Father
- The Rat Patrol (1967, Season 1, Episode 23: "The Holy War Raid") — Holy Man
- I Dream of Jeannie (1967, Season 2, Episode 27: "There Goes the Bride") — Haji
- I Dream of Jeannie (1967, Season 2, Episode 29: "The Birds and the Bees Bit") — Haji
- I Dream of Jeannie (1968, Season 3, Episode 22: "Divorce, Genie Style") — Haji
- Star Trek: The Original Series (1968, Season 3, Episode 6: "Spectre of the Gun") —voice of Melkotian
- Lost in Space (1968, Season 3, Episode 22: "The Flaming Planet") — Sobram
- Kolchak: The Night Stalker (1974, Season 1, Episode 11: "Horror in the Heights") — Ali Lakshmi
