= Kate Plus Ten (film) =

1938 British film by Reginald Denham

- Directed by: Reginald Denham
- Written by: Jeffrey Dell; Jack Hulbert
- Based on: Kate Plus Ten by Edgar Wallace
- Produced by: Richard Wainwright
- Starring: Jack Hulbert; Genevieve Tobin; Noel Madison
- Cinematography: Roy Kellino
- Edited by: Inman Hunter
- Music by: Allan Gray
- Production company: Richard Wainwright Productions
- Distributed by: General Film Distributors
- Release date: 1 August 1938 (UK)
- Running time: 81 minutes
- Country: United Kingdom
- Language: English

Kate Plus Ten (also known as Queen of Crime) is a 1938 British thriller film directed by Reginald Denham and starring Jack Hulbert, Genevieve Tobin and Noel Madison. It was written by Jeffrey Dell and Jack Hulbert adapted from the 1917 Edgar Wallace novel Kate Plus Ten.

== Plot summary ==
Kate Westhanger, the leader of a gang of criminals, works as secretary to an aristocrat allowing her to pick up vital information. However, the police soon become suspicious of her and Scotland Yard's Inspector Pemberton is sent on her trail.

== Cast ==
- Jack Hulbert as Inspector Mike Pemberton
- Genevieve Tobin as Kate Westhanger
- Noel Madison as Gregori
- Francis L. Sullivan as Lord Flamborough
- Arthur Wontner as Colonel Westhanger
- Frank Cellier as Sir Ralph Sapson
- Peter Haddon as Boltover
- Googie Withers as Lady Moya
- Edward Lexy as Sergeant
- Felix Aylmer as Bishop
- Leo Genn as Doctor Gurdon
- James Harcourt as bank manager
- Vincent Holman as detective
- Oliver Johnston as Cunningham
- Ronald Adam as Police Chief
- Philip Leaver as Mulberry
- Arthur Hambling as 3rd signalman
- Bryan Herbert as 2nd signalman
- Leonie Lamartine as stout woman
- Queenie Leonard
- Walter Sondes
- Albert Whelan
- Arthur Brander
- Geoffrey Clark
- Paul Sheridan

== Production ==
The film was an independent production shot at Shepperton Studios.

The final third of the film makes extensive use of railway locations. Among these, the main line between Bath and Westbury (Wiltshire) was employed, with a stolen train smashing through fake level crossing gates at Freshford station. The branch line through Limpley Stoke and Camerton was also featured, and a closed colliery in the Somerset coalfield was the location for the scene in which a steam locomotive crashes through wooden shed doors.

== Critical reception ==
The Monthly Film Bulletin wrote: "A good thriller in a light vein."

Kine Weekly wrote: "Comedy crime thriller, brilliantly adapted from Edgar Wallace's all-time best-seller. The tale is not taken too seriously, but at the same time no flagrant liberties are permitted with the original script. Inconsequential romance, represented by rivalry between a police inspector and the attractive head of a gang of crooks, is cunningly encouraged, and this, in turn, merrily paves the way to breath-taking suspense. The grand finale is great stuff. The cast, too, is highly presentable from the stars downwards, and the technical presentation is excellent. Outstanding general booking, one that will meet all box-office needs."

The Daily Film Renter wrote: "Fast moving Edgar Wallace thriller, with Jack Hulbert as amusing Yard 'tec against brilliant woman crook. Dramatic moments mortared with sparkling comedy, and hero's final pairing off with feminine adversary caters for romantic interest. Punch finale shows villains stealing railway train packed with bullion, and sleuth's victory after thrilling loco-v-car race. Hulbert-Tobin team first-rate. Excellent popular entertainment sure to click."

Britmovie called it a "light-hearted comedy-thriller," adding, "like so many Wallace stories logic takes a back seat, but the speeding train sequence generates some lively thrills, and Hulbert and Tobin craft a likeable onscreen chemistry. Tobin is wickedly delightful as Kate, and Hulbert, who co-wrote the screenplay with Jeffrey Dell, gives an agreeable performance in spite of the artificiality of the role."
