= Virginia's Husband (1928 film) =

1928 film

- Directed by: Harry Hughes
- Written by: Florence Kilpatrick (play); H. Fowler Mear
- Produced by: Archibald Nettlefold
- Starring: Mabel Poulton; Lilian Oldland; Patrick Aherne; Marie Ault
- Production company: Nettlefold Films
- Distributed by: Butcher's Film Service (UK)
- Release date: May 1928 (UK)
- Running time: 6,300 feet
- Country: United Kingdom
- Language: English

Virginia's Husband is a 1928 British silent comedy film directed by Harry Hughes and starring Mabel Poulton, Lilian Oldland and Patrick Aherne. It was based on the play Virginia's Husband by Florence Kilpatrick, and was remade as a sound film in 1934.

== Premise ==
A woman enlists a man to pose as her husband to trick her aunt.

== Cast ==
- Mabel Poulton - Joyce
- Lilian Oldland - Virginia Trevor
- Patrick Aherne - Bill Hemingway
- Marie Ault - Aunt Janet
- Fewlass Llewellyn - Uncle Donald
- Ena Grossmith - Elizabeth
- Charles Dormer - Freddy Parkinson
