= The Strange Countess =

1961 film directed by Josef von Báky

- German film poster
- Directed by: Josef von Báky; Jürgen Roland
- Written by: Curt Hanno Gutbrod; Robert A. Stemmle
- Based on: The Strange Countess by Edgar Wallace
- Produced by: Horst Wendlandt
- Starring: Lil Dagover; Joachim Fuchsberger; Marianne Hoppe
- Cinematography: Richard Angst
- Edited by: Hermann Ludwig
- Music by: Peter Thomas
- Production company: Rialto Film
- Distributed by: Constantin Film
- Release date: 8 November 1961
- Running time: 94 minutes
- Country: West Germany
- Language: German

The Strange Countess (German: Die seltsame Gräfin) is a 1961 West German crime film directed by Josef von Báky and starring Lil Dagover, Joachim Fuchsberger and Marianne Hoppe. It is based on Edgar Wallace's 1925 novel of the same title, and is part of a long-running series of Wallace adaptations produced by Rialto Film. It was shot at the Tempelhof Studios in Berlin. Location shooting took place at the Schloss Ahrensburg. The film's sets were designed by the art director Helmut Nentwig.

== Cast ==
- Lil Dagover as Lady Leonora Moron (title role)
- Joachim Fuchsberger as inspector Michael 'Mike' Dorn
- Brigitte Grothum as Margaret Lois Reedle
- Marianne Hoppe as Mary Pinder
- Rudolf Fernau as Dr. Tappatt
- Richard Häussler as Chesney Praye
- Edith Hancke as Lizzy Smith
- Eddi Arent as Lord Selwyn 'Selly' Moron
- Fritz Rasp as solicitor Shaddle
- Reinhard Kolldehoff as Oliver Frank aka John Addams
- Alexander Engel as patient
- Klaus Kinski as Bresset
- Albert Bessler as prison warden Duffon (uncredited)

== Release ==
The FSK gave the film a rating of 16 years and older, not suitable for public holidays. The film premiered on 8 November 1961 at the Capitol in Trier.

== Bibliography ==
- Bergfelder, Tim. International Adventures: German Popular Cinema and European Co-Productions in the 1960s. Berghahn Books, 2005.
