= Virginia's Husband (1934 film) =

- Reginald Gardiner, Annie Esmond and Dorothy Boyd in the film
- Directed by: Maclean Rogers
- Written by: H. Fowler Mear
- Based on: play Virginia's Husband by Florence Kilpatrick
- Produced by: A. George Smith
- Starring: Reginald Gardiner; Dorothy Boyd; Enid Stamp-Taylor
- Cinematography: Geoffrey Faithfull
- Production companies: Fox Film Company; George Smith Productions (as GS Enterprises)
- Distributed by: Fox Film Company (UK)
- Release date: September 1934 (UK)
- Running time: 71 minutes
- Country: United Kingdom
- Language: English

Virginia's Husband is a 1934 British comedy film directed by Maclean Rogers and starring Dorothy Boyd, Reginald Gardiner and Enid Stamp-Taylor. It was written by H. Fowler Mear, based on the 1926 play of the same title by Florence Kilpatrick, and was made as a quota quickie. Kilpatrick's play had previously been adapted as a silent film in 1928.

== Preservation status ==
The British Film Institute National Archive holds no stills or ephemera, and no film or video materials.

== Plot ==
Virginia Trevor is the unmarried man-hating leader of the "Women's League of Liberty." Because her wealthy aunt, on whom she relies for an allowance, does not approve of women who do not marry, Virginia lies to her aunt that she is married. When the aunt unexpectedly decides to lodge with her, to keep up with the pretence Virginia places an advertisement for a "temporary husband", and young man-about-town John Craddock gets the job. Complications ensue, and Virginia and John end up married.

== Cast ==
- Dorothy Boyd as Virginia Trevor
- Reginald Gardiner as John Craddock
- Enid Stamp-Taylor as June Haslett
- Ena Grossmith as Elizabeth
- Annie Esmond as Mrs. Elkins
- Sebastian Smith as Mr. Ritchie
- Wally Patch as Police Sergeant
- Tom Helmore as Barney Hammond
- Andreas Malandrinos as headwaiter
- Hal Walters as mechanic

== Critical reception ==
Kine Weekly wrote: "Clean, unpretentious farcical comedy, the story of which hinges on a familiar but nevertheless piquant deception. The lively situations are approached in the right spirit by an attractive cast, while the love interest is given suitable recognition. Adequate action prevents the preponderance of dialogue, amusing at times, from becoming irksome. Altogether a homely, entertaining proposition, particularly suitable for family audiences."

The Daily Film Renter wrote: "Although the theme and its presentation are on naive lines, it cannot be denied that some of the situations are genuinely amusing. ... Direction is quite good."

Picturegoer wrote: "Unpretentious farce which is quite well put together and, while rather over-burdened with dialogue, is not lacking in capably handled situations. ... The picture's humour and artifice are quite simple, but nevertheless provide their fair share of amusement."

In their review, TV Guide concluded the film had "Some amusing moments but not enough to sustain the comedy throughout."
