= If I Were Boss (1938 film) =

1938 British film by Maclean Rogers

- Directed by: Maclean Rogers
- Written by: Basil Mason
- Produced by: A. George Smith
- Starring: Bruce Seton; Googie Withers; Ian Fleming
- Cinematography: Geoffrey Faithfull
- Edited by: Daniel Birt
- Production company: George Smith Productions
- Distributed by: Columbia Pictures
- Release date: March 1938
- Running time: 72 minutes
- Country: United Kingdom
- Language: English

If I Were Boss is a 1938 British drama film directed by Maclean Rogers and starring Bruce Seton, Googie Withers and Ian Fleming. It was written by Basil Mason, and was made at the Walton Studios outside London as a quota quickie for distribution by Columbia Pictures.

== Preservation status ==
The British Film Institute National Archive holds a collection of ephemera and stills but no film or video materials.

== Synopsis ==
A young clerk working for a company arrogantly believes he could do a better job running it himself. When he inherits shares in the company, he is able to become the boss but nearly leads the business into bankruptcy after being tricked by swindlers.

== Cast ==
- Bruce Seton as SteveGoogie Withers as Pat
- Ian Fleming as Mr. Biltmore
- Zillah Bateman as Mrs. Biltmore
- Julie Suedo as Irma
- Charles Oliver as Owen Reeves

== Reception ==
The Monthly Film Bulletin wrote: "The story lacks originality, and parts of it are absurd, and unreal."

Kine Weekly wrote: "This story ... is very thin and generally lacking in conviction."

The Daily Film Renter wrote: "Googie Withers is a pleasant heroine, but Bruce Seton is unsuccessful in winning sympathy for the hero. Ian Fleming is restrained as the boss, while Zillah Bateman and Julie Suedo are adequate in supporting roles."

Picturegoer wrote: "It is very thin and none of the characters is of much interest. Googie Withers is fair as the heroine and Bruce Seton succeeds in making the hero a somewhat unpleasant character; neither has any real opportunities."
