= Cicely Waite-Smith =

Jamaican playwright and short story writer (1910–1978)

Cicely Waite-Smith (née Howland) (1910–1978) was a Jamaican playwright and short story writer.

== Early life ==
Cicely Howland was born in Canada in 1910. She studied in England, Switzerland and France. Having returned back to England, Howland became an actress, and left the profession when she married Frank Waite-Smith, a Jamaican.

Waite Smith was invited to a 1957 Belize Festival of Arts drama section as an adjudicator.

== Works ==
- The Wild Horse, 1955
- The Impossible Situation, 1956
- Africa Sling-shot, 1958
- Return to paradise, 1966
- The Creatures
- Family poem
