= Kate Plus 10 (novel) =

1917 novel by Edgar Wallace

- Author: Edgar Wallace
- Language: English
- Genre: crime fiction
- Publisher: Small, Maynard & Company
- Publication date: 1917
- Media type: Print

Kate Plus 10 is a 1917 British crime novel written by Edgar Wallace. In 1938, it was made into a film Kate Plus Ten. It was adapted for the film The Trygon Factor starring Stewart Granger.

== Plot ==
"What an enigma Kate Is!"

Attempts to capture eighteen-year-old criminal mastermind Kate Wasthanger, a colonel's niece and the strategist behind several increasingly successful swindles. These include stealing a complete and valuable railway goods train. "Each one is bigger than the last – but never once have we traced the crime to her door."
