= William Price Drury =

English officer and author (1861–1949)

Lieutenant-Colonel William Price Drury, CBE (8 November 1861 – 21 January 1949) was a Royal Marine Light Infantry officer, novelist and playwright. He served as Mayor of Saltash from 1929 to 1931.

== Life ==
Drury was educated at Brentwood School, Essex, and at Plymouth College. He was commissioned a lieutenant in the Royal Marines Light Infantry on 1 September 1880 and promoted to captain on 2 January 1890. During his Royal Marines career, he served on the China Station and with the Mediterranean Fleet. He commanded the Royal Marines from HMS Camperdown and HMS Astraea, which landed in Crete after local Christians and British soldiers were massacred by Turkish Bashi-bazouk forces in 1898, and was promoted to major on 12 December 1898.

He was appointed to the Naval Intelligence Department in March 1900, and served until he was placed on half-pay on 1 July 1902 due to medical unfitness. He then resigned to pursue his literary career. At the outbreak of World War I, he rejoined the Royal Marines and served as an intelligence officer at Plymouth.

Drury's mother-in-law was the romantic novelist Mrs. Pender Cudlip. The actress Ruth Kettlewell was his niece.

== Work ==
Drury was the author of a range of plays and novels, many with naval themes. Perhaps his best known play, The Flag Lieutenant, was filmed three times: twice as a silent film – in 1919 by Percy Nash and in 1926 by Maurice Elvey, and then again with sound in 1932 by Henry Edwards. The Further Adventures of the Flag Lieutenant was also filmed in 1927, after the huge success of Elvey's adaptation.

The preface of Drury's collection The Tadpole of an Archangel helped to popularise the expression Tell it to the Marines. Drury attributed the phrase to Charles II, reporting that he had made the remark to Samuel Pepys. Drury later admitted this was a fabrication. Drury also wrote a poem entitled The Dead Marines in tribute to the Royal Marines, after the Duke of Clarence supposedly called empty alcohol bottles "Dead Marines".

The Royal Marines Barracks at Stonehouse, Plymouth have a Drury Room containing his desk and memorabilia. Many items from the Drury Room are now on display at Saltash Heritage Museum and Local History Centre.

== List of works ==
- HMS Missfire (1893)
- The Petrified Eye and Other Stories Originally Told to the Marines (1896)
- The Tadpole of an Archangel (1898)
- Bearers of the Burden Being Stories of Land and Sea (1899)
- The Passing of the Flagship (1902)
- The Shadow on the Quarterdeck (1903)
- The Peradventures of Private Pagett (1904)
- A Privy Council (with Richard Pryce) (1906)
- Men-At-Arms (1906)
- The Flag Lieutenant, a naval comedy in four acts (1908)
- Long Bow and Broad Arrow (1911)
- The Admiral Speaks (1912)
- Calamity Jane, RN (1912)
- His Heritage (1916)
- The Porter of Hell: A Drama of 1914 (1918)
- All the King's Men (1919)
- The Incendiaries (1922)
- "Tales of our Ancestors: From Elizabeth to James II" (1926)
- " Tales of our Ancestors: From Anne to the present day" (1926)
- Tales of Our Ancestors: From King Arthur to William IV (1927)
- In Many Parts: The Memoirs of a Marine (1926)
- A Book of St. George (1928)
- The Flag Lieutenant in China (1929)
- Pagett Calling (1930)
- Eight Bells (1932)
- King's Blood (1935)
- A Regency Rascal (1937)
- Fightingcocks (1939)
