= The Flag Lieutenant (1932 film) =

1932 British war film by Henry Edwards

- Directed by: Henry Edwards
- Written by: Leo Tover (play); W.P. Drury (play); Joan Morgan
- Produced by: Herbert Wilcox
- Starring: Henry Edwards; Anna Neagle; Joyce Bland; Peter Gawthorne
- Cinematography: Stanley Rodwell
- Edited by: Michael Hankinson
- Music by: Harris Weston
- Production company: British and Dominions
- Distributed by: Woolf and Freedman
- Release date: 12 October 1932
- Running time: 85 minutes
- Country: United Kingdom
- Language: English

The Flag Lieutenant is a 1932 British war film based on the play by William Price Drury and directed by and starring Henry Edwards, Anna Neagle, Joyce Bland, and Peter Gawthorne. The film's plot involves a lieutenant who is wrongly accused of cowardice.

== Production ==
The film was made at British and Dominions Imperial Studios, Elstree. It is based on the play of the same title which had previous been adapted into films in 1919 and 1927. The film provided an early leading role for Neagle, who was under contract to the producer Herbert Wilcox and would later become his wife.

== Cast ==
- Henry Edwards as Lieutenant Dicky Lascelles
- Anna Neagle as Hermione Wynne
- Joyce Bland as Mrs Cameron
- Peter Gawthorne as Major Thesiger
- Louis Goodrich as Admiral Wynne
- Sam Livesey as Colonel McLeod
- Michael Hogan as Lieutnenat Palliser
- O. B. Clarence as General Gough-Bogle
- Abraham Sofaer as Meheti Salos
- Peter Northcote as Midshipman Lee
- Tully Comber as Midshipman Hood

== Bibliography ==
- Low, Rachael. Filmmaking in 1930s Britain. George Allen & Unwin, 1985.
- Wood, Linda. British Films, 1927–1939. British Film Institute, 1986.
