= Night Journey (1938 film) =

1938 film

- Patricia Hilliard and Geoffrey Toone in the film
- Directed by: Oswald Mitchell
- Written by: Jim Phelan; Maisie Sharman
- Produced by: John Corfield
- Starring: Geoffrey Toone; Patricia Hilliard; Alf Goddard
- Cinematography: Geoffrey Faithfull
- Edited by: Douglas Myers
- Music by: Percival Mackey
- Production company: British National Films
- Distributed by: Butcher's Film Service
- Release date: December 1938
- Running time: 76 minutes
- Country: United Kingdom
- Language: English
- Budget: £15,692

Night Journey is a 1938 British crime drama film directed by Oswald Mitchell and starring Geoffrey Toone, Patricia Hilliard and Alf Goddard. It was written by Jim Phelan and Maisie Sharman.

It was shot at Walton Studios as a quota quickie, and was a co-production between British National and Butcher's. The film's sets were designed by the art director R. Holmes Paul.

The film was one of a series about British lorry drivers made around this time, others including Night Ride (1937) and They Drive By Night (1938).

== Plot ==
A story of the activities of a gang of car thieves whose rendezvous is an all-night café, built up against a disused chalk quarry, where stolen cars are brought to be disguised and sent on their way again for disposal in distant towns.

== Cast ==
- Geoffrey Toone as Johnny Carson
- Patricia Hilliard as Mary Prentice
- Alf Goddard as Tiny
- Edward Lexy as Milstone Mike
- Ronald Ritchie as Lemmy
- Zillah Bateman as Nan
- Charles Farrell as Dave
- Richard Norris as Harry
- Phyllis Morris as Mrs Prentice

== Reception ==
The Monthly Film Bulletin wrote: "Topical crime story of lorry drivers on the Great North Road. ... Whilst the photography is commendable, the haphazard story starts numerous side interests without attempting to satisfy them and parts of the film are a good deal longer than is warranted by either entertainment value or dramatic quality. The acting is efficient but not impressive."

Kine Weekly wrote: "Melodrama of the Great North Road incorporating many themes within its basic one. Prodigality of interests leads at times to some narrator confusion, but the vigour of the atmosphere and the major characterization more than compensates for spasmodic lapses of directorial discipline. Stern drama, crisp comedy, tender romance, and big thrills alternate for the most part in arresting and entertaining order. Very good booking for the masses and industrial audiences."
