= Sheerluck Jones, or Why D'Gillette Him Off =

Scenes from Sheerluck Jones, or Why D'Gillette Him Off - Tatler (1902)

The Policeman and Professor MacGillicuddy

Sheerluck Jones and Miss Baulkner

Clarence Blakiston as Sheerluck Jones (right) - Tatler (1902)

Sheerluck Jones, or Why D'Gillette Him Off is a burlesque on the popular 1899 play Sherlock Holmes. The comedy starred Clarence Blakiston as Sheerluck Jones and ran at Terry's Theatre (1901-02) for 138 performances.

== History ==
In 1901 William Gillette brought Sherlock Holmes to the Lyceum Theatre in London where it proved to be a great success. The parody Sheerluck Jones, or Why D’Gillette Him Off opened on 29 October 1901 and ran at an hour long. It was written by Malcolm Watson and Edward La Serre as a "dramatic criticism in four burlesque paragraphs and as many headlines" Each evening it preceded The New Clown by H. M. Paull.

== Play ==
The names of the characters in Gillette's play had been slightly manipulated, and as the Tatler in its review mentioned, "The point about the pronunciation of MacGillicuddy is to be found in the extraordinary way in which the name of Moriarty, a difficult word to say, is pronounced at the Lyceum." The Tatler also noted that, "The peculiarities of Mr. Gillette's company are so marked that it is not difficult to imitate them. Mr. Gillette's own impressively monotonous style is admirably reproduced by Mr. Clarence Blakiston and the hop-skip-and-jump manner in which Larrabee is played is humorously exaggerated in Scarab... One of the funniest incidents in the burlesque, which from beginning to end is entirely good-humoured, is the opening of the safe with an egg whisk."

== Reviews ==
A review in The Advertiser in Adelaide said of the production:

"Sheerluck Jones, or Why D'Gillette Him Off" which is now the second item at Terry's Theatre. To enjoy the latter thoroughly, and Mr. Clarence Blakiston's inimitable imitation of Mr. Gillette, you want to see the former. The travesty shows up the absurdities of the original in a screamingly funny fashion. The detective's deductions fail, and Professor McGillicuddy, the Lipton of Crime (Professor Moriarity, "the Napoleon of Crime" in the original) simply romps in. One of the best bits of fooling is in the gas-chamber at Stepney, to which Sheerluck is to be lured and suffocated. The gas-collector arrives with a long bill, and threatens to cut off the supply when the arrears are at once paid. If Sherlock and Sheerluck come your way, go and see them both.

The critic for Punch wrote:

In these days, when burlesque is not regarded favourably, although not altogether considered as a lost art, a signal tribute to the exceptional success of Sherlock Holmes is the fairly successful attempt at travestying it at Terry's Theatre. One of its authors is Mr Watson, whom his collaborator, Mr La Serre, must often have asked, "Do you follow me, Watson?" Miss Lee's caricature of the style and make-up of the Lyceum heroine is very good, and the same may be said of Mr Clarence Blakiston who cleverly reproduces some of the mannerisms of Mr Gillette as the great detective, but who fails in the make-up, which is just à peu près. Nothing could be better than the caricature of Forman by Mr Egerton Hubbard; and Mr J. Willes, representing the Lyceum Professor Moriarty, plays the part with such real burlesque humour as to atone for the dissimilarity in appearance between him and Mr Abingdon. The slamming of the doors, the banging on the floor, the rattling noises "heard without", the perpetual pistols of the original, are turned to good account, while very little is made out of the incident of "following the cigar." Indeed, several evident points have been lost by these burlesque-writers. With the aid of so clever a musical director as Mr Buccalossi the authors ought to have introduced some real good "numbers" and eccentric dances, without which, coming in as surprises, it is very difficult for any burlesque to achieve genuine success. What a hit might have been made by Sherlock Holmes revealing his knowledge of the principal villain's real character in a song commencing "I'll sing thee songs of Larabee!" The burlesque is good as far as it goes, but it does not go far enough.

== Scenes ==
The Place is the Strand. The Time - Any Time

- First Part: A Musical Evening at the Scarabees
- Second Part: Sheerluck Finds His Match & Lights a Pipe With It
- Third Part: The Trail of a Cigar
- Fourth Part: The Pleasures of Smoke

== Cast ==
Lyceum characters	Terry's characters	Terry's cast
Sherlock Holmes	Sheerluck Jones	Mr Clarence Blakiston
Dr. Watson	Dr. Rotson	Mr Carter Pickford
John Forman	John Toanfroman	Mr J. Egerton Hubbard
Sir Edward Leighton	Sir Edward Sleighton	Professor MacGillicuddy
Count von Stahlburg	Baron Pumpernickel	Mr Sidney Pinch
Professor Moriarty	Professor MacGillicuddy (pronounced Machlicuddy)	Mr J. Wiles
James Larrabee	James Scarabee	Mr Russell Norrie
Sidney Prince	Sidney Pinch	Mr F. Cremlin
Alfred Bassick	Thomas Bleary	Mr E. J. Blumberg
Jim Craigin	Braigin	Mr A. James
"Lightfoot" McTague	The Gas Collector	Mr Martin Harper
Parsons	Carsons	Mr Garry
Billy	Little Billee	Mr Gunnis Davis
Madge Larrabee	Madge Scarabee	Miss Portia Knight
Alice Faulkner	Alice Baulkner	Miss Gordon Lee
