= Windfall (1935 film) =

- Directed by: Frederick Hayward; George King
- Written by: Randall Faye; Jack Celestin
- Based on: play Windfall by R.C. Sherriff
- Produced by: George King; Randall Faye
- Starring: Edward Rigby; Marie Ault; George Carney
- Production company: Embassy Film Company
- Distributed by: RKO Radio Pictures (UK)
- Release date: 25 November 1935 (UK)
- Running time: 65 minutes
- Country: United Kingdom
- Language: English

Windfall is a 1935 British drama film adapted by Jack Celestin and Randall Faye from the R. C. Sherriff play of the same title. The film was directed by Frederick Hayward and George King, and starred Edward Rigby and Marie Ault and George Carney. When an elderly ironworker receives a financial windfall, he uses the money to retire, but his family and those around him behave irresponsibly.

== Cast ==
- Edward Rigby as Sam Spooner
- Marie Ault as Maggie Spooner
- George Carney as Syd
- Marjorie Corbett as Mary
- Derrick De Marney as Tom Spooner
- Googie Withers as Dodie
- Charles Hawtrey as Minor Role (uncredited)
