= Googie Withers =

British actress and entertainer (1917–2011)

Googie Withers AO CBE
- Withers in 1947
- Born: Georgette Lizette Withers; 12 March 1917; Karachi, British India
- Died: 15 July 2011 (aged 94); Sydney, Australia
- Education: Italia Conti Academy of Theatre Arts
- Occupations: Actress, dancer
- Years active: 1929–2002
- Spouse: John McCallum (m. 1948; died 2010)
- Children: 3, including Joanna

Georgette Lizette "Googie" Withers (12 March 1917 – 15 July 2011) was an English dancer and actress, with a lengthy career spanning some 73 years in theatre, film, and television. She was a well-known actress and star of British films during and after the Second World War.

Withers often featured in British productions, primarily in films with actor and producer John McCallum, whom she married and, in the late 1950s, emigrated together to her husband's native Australia, where they became best known in theatre. During the 1970s, she played prison governor Faye Boswell in the TV series Within These Walls, and continued to feature in films. She won the inaugural British Academy Television Award for Best Actress in 1955.

== Biography ==
Withers was born in Karachi, British India (now Pakistan), to Edgar Withers, a captain in the Royal Navy, and Lizette Wilhelmina Katarina, of Dutch, French and German descent. She was named after her aunt Georgette Ottolina, but was fondly given the name "chota ghugi" at a young age by her Punjabi ayah (nanny), "chota ghugi" being Punjabi for "little dove", which became anglicised to "Googie". She became used to the nickname and decided to keep it as her stage name.

After her father left the Royal Navy to manage a foundry in Birmingham, England, Googie was sent to Fredville Park School, a boarding school in Nonington, and a secondary day school in London.

== Acting career ==
Withers began acting at the age of twelve, and was student at the Italia Conti Academy of Theatre Arts, and at the dance school of Buddy Bradley, where she learnt ballet and tap. She was a dancer in a West End production when she was offered work as a film extra in Michael Powell's The Girl in the Crowd (1935). She arrived on the set to find one of the major players in the production had been dismissed, and she was immediately asked to step into the leading role, beginning a seven year contract with Warner Brothers, after which she worked for Fox British, Ealing Studios and The Rank Organisation.

During the 1930s, Withers was constantly in demand in lead roles in minor films, and supporting roles in more prestigious productions. She was in Windfall (1935) and The Love Test (1935), and she had the lead in All at Sea (1935).

Withers supported in Dark World (1935), King of Hearts (1936), and Accused (1936). Her Last Affaire (1935) was her third film with Powell.

She followed it with She Knew What She Wanted (1936), Crown v. Stevens (1936) (directed by Powell), Crime Over London (1936), Pearls Bring Tears (1937), Action for Slander (1937), and Paradise for Two (1937).

Withers had the lead in You're the Doctor (1938) and was back to support for Kate Plus Ten (1938). Her best-known work of the period was as one of Margaret Lockwood's friends in Alfred Hitchcock's The Lady Vanishes (1938).

She continued in support roles in Paid in Error (1938) and Strange Boarders (1938). She was in a Will Hay film Convict 99 (1938) and supported Jack Buchanan in The Gang's All Here (1939). Then she appeared in crime films Murder in Soho (1939) and Dead Men are Dangerous (1939).

She supported George Formby in Trouble Brewing (1939) and Tommy Trinder in She Couldn't Say No (1939). She was in a Robert Montgomery film Busman's Honeymoon (1939) and was reunited with Buchanan in Bulldog Sees It Through (1940). She was still supporting comics in Back-Room Boy (1942) with Arthur Askey.

=== Rising fame ===
Among her successes of the 1940s, and a departure from her previous roles, was the Powell and Pressburger film One of Our Aircraft Is Missing (1942), a topical World War II drama, in which she played a Dutch resistance fighter who helps British airmen return to safety from behind enemy lines.

Powell and Pressburger then used her in a film they produced but did not direct, The Silver Fleet (1943). She played Helen, a significant second lead in the Clive Book-directed 1944 comedy On Approval.

Withers was in They Came to a City (1945), directed by Basil Dearden, and was one of several stars in Dead of Night (1945).

She was given a star part in Pink String and Sealing Wax (1945). It was well received, and Withers was given the title role in The Loves of Joanna Godden (1947), which was a hit. In the cast was actor John McCallum, whom Withers later married. They remained married until McCallum died in 2010.

Withers then starred in It Always Rains on Sunday (1948), which was one of the biggest hits of the year. In 1948, British exhibitors voted her the 8th most popular British star in the country.

Three comedies followed: the hugely popular Miranda (1948), with McCallum, and Once Upon a Dream (1949) and Traveller's Joy (1949), both directed by Ralph Thomas. Next, she was third-billed after Hollywood stars Gene Tierney and Richard Widmark in the tense thriller Night and the City (1950).

Withers took 13 months off following the birth of her first child, then returned to star as a doctor in White Corridors (1951), one of the most popular films of the year in Britain. She was one of many cameos in The Magic Box (1951) and was in a play Winter Journey.

Withers made three films with her husband, Derby Day (1952), Devil on Horseback (1954), and Port of Escape (1956).

In 1954, she starred with McCallum in the West End play Waiting for Gillian, by Ronald Millar.

=== Australia ===
Withers first toured Australia in the stage play Simon and Laura. After McCallum was offered the position of running J. C. Williamson theatres, they moved to Australia in 1959. Withers starred in a number of stage plays, including Rattigan's The Deep Blue Sea, Desire of the Moth, The First 400 Years (with Keith Michell), The Circle, A. R. Gurney's The Cocktail Hour, Time and the Conways, The Importance of Being Earnest, Beekman Place (1965), for which she also designed the set. Desire of the Moth, The Kingfisher, Stardust, Chekhov's The Cherry Orchard and Wilde's An Ideal Husband for the Melbourne Theatre Company; both productions toured Australia. They appeared together in the UK in The School for Scandal at the Duke of York's Theatre in London's West End and on the subsequent British Council tour of Europe in 1983–84, and in W. Somerset Maugham's The Circle at the Chichester Festival Theatre. Withers starred on Broadway with Michael Redgrave in The Complaisant Lover, and in London with Alec Guinness in Exit the King.

=== Later career ===
Withers returned to films with the lead in Nickel Queen (1971), directed by McCallum.

She was in The Cherry Orchard (1974) on Australian TV.

In 1974, she appeared as Faye Boswell, the original governor of a women's prison, in the television series Within These Walls. Because Within These Walls had been a moderate success in Australia, she was approached by producers to play the role of the Governor in the Australian version titled Prisoner, but she declined and the role was given to Patsy King.

Performances on the stage in productions of The Cherry Orchard and An Ideal Husband earned Withers a nomination in the Actress of the Year in a Revival at the 1976 Laurence Olivier Awards.

Withers starred in the BBC adaptation of Hotel du Lac (1986), which was followed a year later by another BBC production, Northanger Abbey.

In 1989, she appeared at Brighton in England in The Cocktail Hour alongside her husband John and her daughter, Joanna. In the previous year, the play had been a success in New York, starring Nancy Marchand. In 1990, she appeared in ITV's adaptation of Ending Up. Her last screen performance was as the Australian novelist Katharine Susannah Prichard in the film Shine (1996), for which she and the other cast members were nominated for a Screen Actors Guild award for "Outstanding performance by a cast".

In 2002, aged 85, Withers, with Vanessa Redgrave, appeared in London's West End, in Oscar Wilde's Lady Windermere's Fan.

In October 2007, aged 90 and 89 respectively, Withers and McCallum appeared in an extended interview with Peter Thompson on ABC TV's Talking Heads programme.

== Death ==
Withers died on 15 July 2011 at her Sydney home, aged 94. Her husband, actor, television producer and studio executive John McCallum predeceased her on 3 February 2010.

== Honours ==
Withers was appointed an Honorary Officer of the Order of Australia (AO) for services to drama, in the 1980 Australia Day Honours List. In the 2001 Queen's Birthday Honours List (UK), she was named a Commander of the Order of the British Empire (CBE). Withers was a JC Williamson Award recipient for lifetime achievement in 1999. In 1992 Googie Withers and John McCallum were founding patrons and active supporters of the Tait Memorial Trust in London. A Charity established by Isla Baring OAM, the daughter of Sir Frank Tait of J. C. Williamson's to support young Australian performing artists in the UK.

She was the subject of This Is Your Life in 1971, when she was surprised by Eamonn Andrews whilst thinking she was going to be interviewed by her close friend Godfrey Winn. Although she knew Andrews, when he appeared as she entered the set, she asked him why he was no longer working as a presenter and was instead working as a floor manager.

== Selected filmography ==
- The Girl in the Crowd (1935) – Sally
- The Love Test (1935) – Minnie
- Windfall (1935) – Dodie
- Her Last Affaire (1935) – Effie
- Dark World (1935) – Annie
- All at Sea (1935) – Daphne Tomkins
- She Knew What She Wanted (1936) – Dora
- Crown v. Stevens (1936) – Ella Levine
- Crime Over London (1936) – Miss Dupres
- Accused (1936) – Ninette Duval
- King of Hearts (1936) – Elaine
- Action for Slander (1937) – Mary
- Pearls Bring Tears (1937) – Doreen
- Paradise for Two (1937) – Miki
- The Green Cockatoo (1937) – (uncredited)
- Paid in Error (1938) – Jean Mason
- If I Were Boss (1938) – Pat
- Strange Boarders (1938) – Elsie
- Convict 99 (1938) – Lottie
- Kate Plus Ten (1938) – Lady Moya
- The Lady Vanishes (1938) – Blanche
- You're the Doctor (1938) – Helen Firmstone
- Trouble Brewing (1939) – Mary Brown
- Murder in Soho (1939) – Lola Matthews
- The Gang's All Here (1939) – Alice Forrest
- Dead Men are Dangerous (1939)
- She Couldn't Say No (1940) – Dora
- Busman's Honeymoon (1940) – Polly
- Bulldog Sees It Through (1940) – Toots
- Jeannie (1941) – Laundry Girl
- Back-Room Boy (1942) – Bobbie
- One of Our Aircraft Is Missing (1942) – Jo de Vries
- The Silver Fleet (1943) – Helène van Leyden
- On Approval (1944) – Helen Hale
- They Came to a City (1945) – Alice
- Dead of Night (1945) – Joan Cortland (segment "Linking Story") / (segment "The Haunted Mirror")
- Pink String and Sealing Wax (1945) – Pearl Bond
- The Loves of Joanna Godden (1947) – Joanna Godden
- It Always Rains on Sunday (1947) – Rose Sandigate
- Miranda (1948) – Clare Martin
- Once Upon a Dream (1949) – Carol Gilbert
- Night and the City (1950) – Helen Nosseross
- Traveller's Joy (1950) – Bumble Pelham
- White Corridors (1951) – Dr. Sophie Dean
- The Magic Box (1951) – Sitter in Bath Studio
- Lady Godiva Rides Again (1951) – Susan Foster (actress in clip, "The Shadow of the Orient") (uncredited)
- Derby Day (1952) – Betty Molloy
- Devil on Horseback (1954) – Mrs. Cadell
- Port of Escape (1956) – Anne Stirling
- The First 400 Years (1964)
- Nickel Queen (1971) – Meg Blake
- The Cherry Orchard (1974, TV Movie) – Ranevskaya
- Within These Walls (1974–1975, TV Series) – Prison Governess – Faye Boswell
- Screen Two (1986, TV Series) – Mrs. Allen / Mrs. Pusey / Leda Klein
- Melba (1988, TV Mini-Series) – Lady Armstrong
- Country Life (1994) – Hannah
- Shine (1996) – Katharine Susannah Prichard (final film role)
