= Mary Davis (actress) =

British-American silent film actress (1870–1944)

Mary Isabel Gunnis Davis (born 1870 in London, England–Died 15 July 1944 in San Bernardino) was a British-born American silent film actress. She was married to J. Gunnis Davis.

== Motion pictures ==
She made her début in Hollywood with a role in Leave It To Cissy (1916). This appearance was followed by parts credited as Mary I. Davis in I Accuse and Mary G. Davis in The Haunted Manor, both from 1916. Her career was short-lived, concluding with performances in Rich Man, Poor Man (1918), Mrs. Wiggs of the Cabbage Patch (1919), and An Amateur Widow (1919).

She is also sometimes credited as Mary B. Davis, Mary Gunniss, and Mary Gunniss Davis.

Davis' Los Angeles, California address was 1113 South Union Avenue. She died at the Ramona Community Hospital in San Bernardino in California in 1944.

== Personal life ==
Born in London in 1870 as Mary Isabel Michael, she was the daughter of surgeon John William Michael (1847–1897) and Kate née Soilleux (1844–1913). She married Henry Warnell Denton-Cardew (1860–1894) in 1889 and with him had two children: Mary Isabel Denton Cardew (1890–1967), and Warnell De Montigny Denton Cardew (1892–1917). In 1897 she married the actor Spencer Trevor (1875–1945) and with him had a son, John Spencer Trevor Andrews (1897–1984); they divorced in 1901 as a result of her adultery with the actor J. Gunnis Davis. Thirdly, after her divorce she married J. Gunnis Davis in London in 1902 and with him had a son, James Gunnis J Davis (1906–1992).

== Assault victim ==
In 1928 she filed a criminal complaint against Dr. J.C. Woodward after going to his office for treatment. She charged the physician with kicking and beating her. Davis told the chief prosecutor that Woodward started a drinking party and made advances toward her. When she resisted he knocked her down and kicked her in the abdomen. Davis was then thrown out into the corridor of the building and was picked up by a tenant from an adjacent room. She was sent home in a taxicab. Woodward was placed under arrest and taken before a municipal judge. He entered a plea of guilty to both charges and awaited sentencing.
