= Chastity (1923 film) =

1923 film by Victor Schertzinger

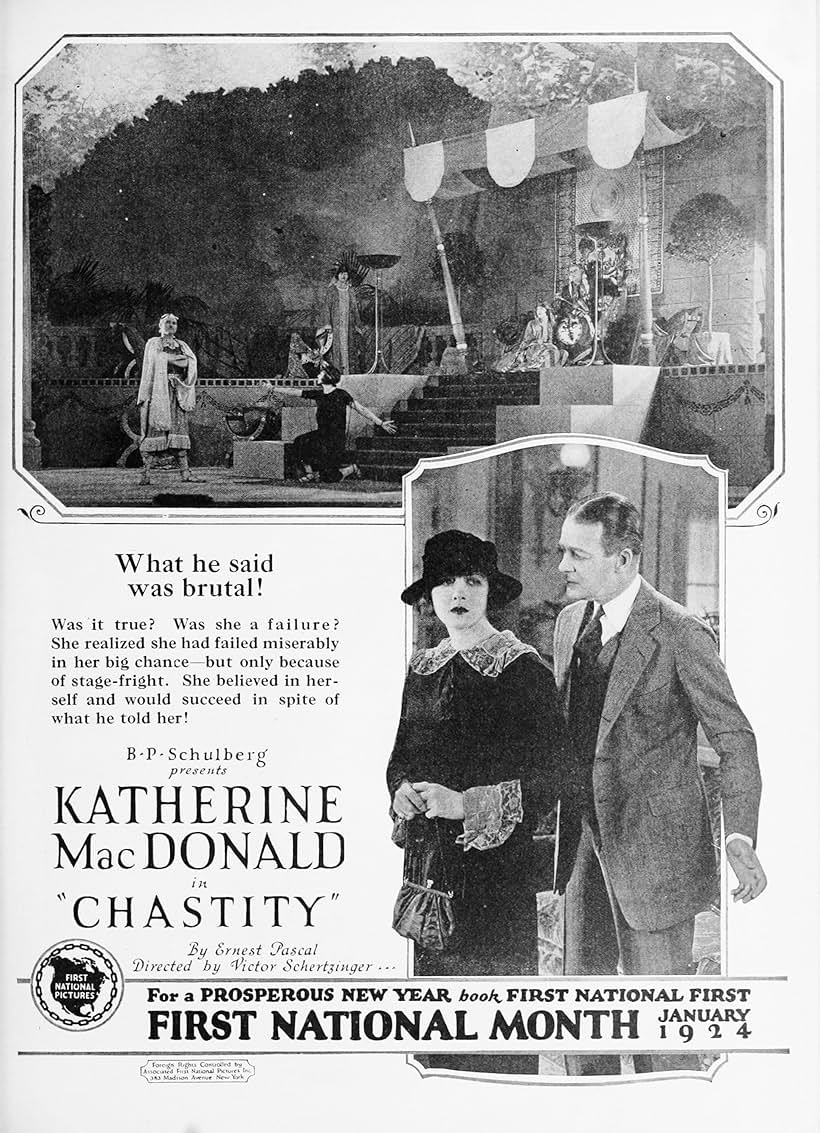
- Film ad
- Directed by: Victor Schertzinger
- Written by: Ernest Pascal
- Produced by: B.P. Schulberg
- Starring: Katherine MacDonald; J. Gunnis Davis; Huntley Gordon
- Cinematography: Ernest Miller; Joseph Brotherton
- Edited by: Eve Unsell
- Production company: Preferred Pictures
- Distributed by: First National Pictures
- Release date: December 31, 1923
- Running time: 6 reels
- Country: United States
- Language: Silent (English intertitles)

Chastity is a 1923 American silent drama film directed by Victor Schertzinger and starring Katherine MacDonald, J. Gunnis Davis, and Huntley Gordon.

== Plot ==
As described in a film magazine review, unsuccessful at first on the stage, Norma O'Neill finally wins Broadway recognition. Gossip links her name with that of Fergus Arlington, who had backed her. Darcy Roche, in love with Norma, is jealous of Fergus and reproaches Norma. Norma decides to leave the stage. She is reported as having been killed in an automobile accident, but the body is that of her understudy, mistaken for her. Later Darcy meets Norma in California, and she explains that Fergus was her guardian. The lovers are reunited.

== Cast ==
- Katherine MacDonald as Norma O'Neill
- J. Gunnis Davis as Nat Mason
- J. Gordon Russell as Sam Wolfe
- Huntley Gordon as Darcy Roche
- Frederick Truesdell as Fergus Arlington
- Edythe Chapman as Mrs. Harris
- Verne Winter

== Preservation ==
The film is now lost.

== Bibliography ==
- James Robert Parish and Michael R. Pitts. Film directors: a guide to their American films. Scarecrow Press, 1974. ISBN 0810807521
