= Raymond Glendenning =

British sports commentator (1907–1974)

- Born: Raymond Carl Glendenning; 25 September 1907; Newport, Monmouthshire, Wales
- Died: 23 February 1974 (aged 66); Buckinghamshire, England
- Occupation: Sports commentator

Raymond Carl Glendenning (25 September 1907 – 23 February 1974) was a BBC radio sports commentator and occasional character actor.

== Early years ==
Glendenning was born in Newport, Monmouthshire, Wales, son of Robert James Samuel Glendenning, a commercial clerk and later a company director, and his wife Mathilde Anna Elise, née Deveridge. He was educated at Newport High School and graduated from the University of London with a BCom. He worked briefly as a chartered accountant before joining the BBC as an organiser on Children's Hour in Cardiff in 1932.

== Pre-war and wartime career ==
In 1935 he moved to Belfast as an outside broadcasts assistant, and began commentating on local sporting events on the BBC's Northern Ireland service. In 1939 he moved to London and joined the national outside broadcasts staff, becoming assistant director in 1942. By this time he was commentating on many major sporting events, and by the end of the Second World War was the BBC's leading sports commentator.

== Postwar career ==
He covered the FA Cup Final every year from 1946 to 1963. He also commentated on the 1962 World Cup and regularly on domestic and international football matches. Glendenning also commentated regularly on boxing, on horse racing (until the end of 1960) and Wimbledon tennis, as well as covering greyhound racing, and show jumping in the 1948 London Olympics.

== Manner and appearance ==
He was noted for his horn-rimmed glasses, his handlebar moustache and for his fast-paced, excitable, somewhat plummy broadcasting style. He was a popular public figure, lending his name to a number of sports books, mostly aimed at boys.

== Private life ==
Glendenning was an active Freemason under the United Grand Lodge of England (UGLE). He was initiated in Wales in the Nioba Lodge No 5264 (Newport), and subsequently joined lodges in London including Avenue Lodge No 3231 (whose members were all members of the Constitutional Club), and Shakespear Lodge No 99. After serving as a Grand Steward of UGLE he also joined the Grand Stewards' Lodge.

== Broadcasting retirement ==
He gave up sports commentary in the early months of 1964.

He died aged 66 on 23 February 1974, from a heart attack.

== Selected filmography ==
- Asking for Trouble (1942)
- Sussex Fortnight (1950)
- The Galloping Major (film) (1951)
- Derby Day (1952)
- Dry Rot (1955)
- Make Mine a Million (1959)
- The Iron Maiden (1962)

== Sources ==
- Oxford Dictionary of National Biography (includes photo)
