= Derby Day (1952 film) =

British drama by Herbert Wilcox

- Directed by: Herbert Wilcox
- Written by: Arthur Austen; John Baines; Monckton Hoffe; Alan Melville
- Produced by: Maurice Cowan; Hebert Wilcox
- Starring: Anna Neagle; Michael Wilding; Googie Withers; John McCallum; Peter Graves; Suzanne Cloutier; Gordon Harker
- Narrated by: Raymond Glendenning
- Cinematography: Mutz Greenbaum
- Edited by: Bill Lewthwaite
- Music by: Anthony Collins
- Production company: Herbert Wilcox Productions
- Distributed by: British Lion Film Corporation
- Release date: 9 May 1952
- Running time: 84 minutes
- Country: United Kingdom
- Language: English
- Box office: £150,010 (UK)

Derby Day (U.S. title: Four Against Fate) is a 1952 British drama film directed by Herbert Wilcox and starring Anna Neagle, Michael Wilding, Googie Withers, John McCallum, Peter Graves, Suzanne Cloutier and Gordon Harker. An ensemble piece, it portrays several characters on their way to the Derby Day races at Epsom Downs Racecourse. It was an attempt to revive the success that Neagle and Wilding had previously enjoyed on screen together. To promote the film, Wilcox arranged for Neagle to launch the film at the 1952 Epsom Derby.

While making the film, Wilding began dating Elizabeth Taylor, who was in London filming Ivanhoe, and later became her second husband.

== Plot ==
On the morning of the Epsom Derby, a disparate group of people prepare to go to the races. Lady Helen Forbes, a recently widowed aristocrat, is planning to make the journey in spite of the disapproval of her social set who consider it unseemly for her to go while still in mourning. David Scott, a newspaper cartoonist, is ordered to go by his editor against his wishes. He invites his taxi driver, along with the driver's wife, to join him. When the taxi breaks down, Lady Forbes offers him a lift.

As part of a charity raffle, dissolute film star Gerald Berkeley must reluctantly escort a wealthy grand dame to Epsom, although when the woman falls and injures her leg, her crafty housekeeper arranges for the young French Canadian maid to go in her place. A lodger accidentally kills a man whose wife he has been having an affair with. The lodger and the wife plan to flee the country, so they travel to Epsom, where he knows a tipster who may be able to smuggle them out. While waiting for the race to start, Lady Forbes and David Scott meet up again, and find themselves sharing confidences, as they were both bereaved by the same air crash. It seems likely that they will meet again.

The lodger and the wife are spotted and arrested. The taxi driver's wife decides that she enjoyed the day at the races after all, despite her earlier reluctance to attend.

== Cast ==
- Anna Neagle as Lady Helen Forbes
- Michael Wilding as David Scott, the cartoonist
- Googie Withers as Betty Molloy
- John McCallum as Tommy Dillon
- Peter Graves as Gerald Berkeley, film star
- Suzanne Cloutier as Michele Jolivet
- Gordon Harker as Joe Jenkins
- Edwin Styles as Sir George Forbes
- Gladys Henson as Gladys Jenkins
- Nigel Stock as Jim Molloy
- Ralph Reader as Bill Hammond
- Tom Walls Jr. as Gilpin
- Josephine Fitzgerald as O'Shaughnessy, the cook
- Alfie Bass as Spider Wilkes
- Toni Edgar-Bruce as Mrs. Harbottle-Smith
- Ewan Roberts as Jock, the studio driver
- Leslie Weston as Capt. Goggs
- Sam Kydd as Harry Bunn, the bookie
- Raymond Glendenning as himself
- Brian Johnston as interviewer
- Richard Wattis as newspaper editor
- Frank Webster as taxi driver
- Gerald Anderson as police sergeant
- Robert Brown as Foste, Berkeley's butler
- John Chandos as man on train
- Cyril Conway as Hinchcliffe, coalman
- Arthur Hambling as Colonel Tremaine
- H.R. Hignett as Lawson, Lady Forbes' butler
- Prince Monolulu as himself
- Myrette Morven as Mrs. Tremaine
- Hugh Moxey as police constable
- Jan Pilbeam as 1st maid
- Mary Gillingham as 2nd maid
- Derek Prentice as old man
- Michael Ripper as 1st newspaper reporter
- Philip Ray as 2nd newspaper reporter
- Cecily Walper as Mrs. Wickham, housekeeper

== Critical reception ==
The Monthly Film Bulletin wrote: "The film involves a stereotyped collection of characters in some equally familiar situations, For the lower orders there is crime (John McCallum, unshaven, breathing heavily and on the run) and artificial Cockney comedy (Gladys Henson and Gordon Harker) with only one joke – the hypothetical superiority of television to the real thing. The film star (Peter Graves) makes tiresomely coy intramural jokes about the British film industry; the maid (Suzanne Cloutier) is stage French. The upper classes, represented by Anna Neagle and Michael Wilding – who contrive to look as though they were posing for an advertisement in a glossy magazine – suffer bravely but woodenly over their champagne. A script sadly deficient in wit, originality or probability shows up the pedestrian nature of Herbert Wilcox's technique. Usually he presents similar ingredients with a certain showmanship, but here excessive loyalty to a formula has produced far from happy results."

The Radio Times Guide to Films gave the film 3/5 stars, writing: "This is an engaging, absorbing look at the various flotsam and jetsam that pit themselves against the Fates at Epsom Downs on Derby Day. The British class system was firmly rooted and unassailable in the early 1950s, and director Herbert Wilcox nicely milks its rituals and nuances at a great cultural event. The portmanteau cast effortlessly goes through its paces with aplomb and confidence. We have been here many times before, but it's still fun."

In British Sound Films: The Studio Years 1928–1959 David Quinlan rated the film as "average", writing: "Neagle-WIlding formula wearing thin."

Leslie Halliwell said: "Intercut comic and melodramatic stories of four people who go to the Derby. Quietly efficient, class-conscious entertainment on the lines of Friday the 13th and The Bridge of San Luis Rey. No surprises, but plenty of familiar faces."

== See also ==
- List of films about horse racing
