= The Girl in the Crowd =

- Googie Withers (seated, left)
- Directed by: Michael Powell
- Written by: Brock Williams
- Produced by: Michael Balcon
- Starring: Barry Clifton; Patricia Hilliard; Googie Withers; Harold French
- Cinematography: Basil Emmott
- Edited by: Bert Bates
- Distributed by: Warner Brothers-First National Productions
- Release date: 20 May 1935 (UK)
- Running time: 52 min
- Country: United Kingdom
- Language: English

The Girl in the Crowd is a 1935 British comedy film directed by Michael Powell starring Barry Clifton, Patricia Hilliard, and Googie Withers. It was written by Brock Williams.

== Preservation status ==
The British Film Institute has classed The Girl in the Crowd as a lost film. Its National Archive holds a collection of stills but no film or video materials.

== Plot ==
The wife of a bookseller gives advice about picking up women to her husband's friend (whom she has never met) over the phone. She advises him simply to follow the first pretty woman he sees. Unfortunately, when he takes her advice, she is the girl in the crowd he ends up following, leading to his arrest.

== Cast ==
- Barry Clifton as David Gordon
- Patricia Hilliard as Marian
- Googie Withers as Sally
- Harold French as Bob
- Clarence Blakiston as Mr. Peabody
- Margaret Gunn as Joyce
- Richard Littledale as Bill Manners
- Phyllis Morris as Mrs.Lewis
- Patric Knowles as Tom Burrows
- Marjorie Corbett as secretary
- Brenda Lawless as policewoman
- Barbara Waring as mannequin
- Eve Lister as Ruby
- Betty Lyne as Phyllis
- Melita Bell as assistant manageress
- John Wood as Harry

== Production ==
Withers was an extra, until the second female lead quit and she took over.

== Reception ==
Kine Weekly wrote: "Mildly amusing comedy of mistaken identity, flimsy and disjointed in plot, but containing some well devised situation and a good proportion of technical polish. It makes a very usable quota booking. ... As Bob, an irrepressible philanderer, Harold French is effective; and Barry Clifton is good as David. The girls are all attractive, but do not show to great histrionic advantage. Patricia Hilliard as Marion has a great deal of charm which, given opportunity, could well be exploited."

The Daily Film Renter wrote: "Feeble farce comedy. ... Development occasionally obscure, direction mediocre and settings unconvincing. ... Laboured satire on public school policemen and 'below-stairs' humour fail to prove more than moderately amusing. Patricia Hilliard gives interesting portrayal in feminine lead. Quota fare for the uncritical only."

Picturegoer wrote: "Some well-devised situations, and sound technical polish, help to brighten up the otherwise flimsy and disjointed plot of this mildly amusing comedy. It is a trifling affair, weak in continuity, but generally competently directed, although occasionally there is an atmosphere of amateur theatricals about it."
