= Spencer Trevor =

British actor (1875–1945)

- Born: 29 May 1875; Biarritz, Pyrénées-Atlantiques, France
- Died: 22 May 1945 (aged 69); London, United Kingdom
- Occupation: Actor
- Years active: 1916–1943 (film)

Spencer Trevor (29 May 1875 – 22 May 1945) was a British stage and film actor.

He was born as Spencer Trevor Andrews. In 1897 he married the actress Mary Davis (1870–1944) and with her had a son, John Spencer Trevor Andrews (1897–1984); they divorced in 1901 as a result of her adultery with the actor J. Gunnis Davis.

== Selected filmography ==
- Lucky Girl (1932)
- Congress Dances (1932)
- Two White Arms (1932)
- The Return of Bulldog Drummond (1934)
- Blossom Time (1934)
- Let the People Sing (1942)
- The Life and Death of Colonel Blimp (1943)

== Bibliography ==
- Michelangelo Capua. Deborah Kerr: A Biography. McFarland, 2010.
