= Devil on Horseback =

1954 British film by Cyril Frankel

- Directed by: Cyril Frankel
- Written by: Neil Paterson; Montagu Slater; Geoffrey Orme
- Story by: James Curtis
- Produced by: John Grierson; Isobel Pargiter
- Starring: Googie Withers; John McCallum; Jeremy Spenser
- Cinematography: Denny Densham
- Edited by: Sidney Stone
- Music by: Malcolm Arnold
- Production company: Group 3 Films
- Distributed by: British Lion Films
- Release date: 17 March 1954
- Running time: 88 minutes
- Country: United Kingdom
- Language: English

Devil on Horseback is a 1954 British sports drama film directed by Cyril Frankel and starring Googie Withers, John McCallum and Jeremy Spenser. The screenplay was by Scottish writer Neil Paterson.

== Plot ==
Fourteen-year-old Moppy Parfit pursues his ambition to be a jockey. As his career progresses his arrogance leads him into trouble but he learns to fight his faults.

== Cast ==
- Googie Withers as Mrs Cadell
- John McCallum as Charles Roberts
- Jeremy Spenser as Moppy Parfitt
- Meredith Edwards as Ted Fellowes
- Liam Redmond as Scarlett O'Hara
- Sam Kydd as Darky
- Bill Shine as steward
- Lucy Griffiths as maid
- Brian Oulton as Villiers
- Malcolm Knight as Squib
- Peter Lindsay as Len
- Eric Francis as Reg Guest
- Vic Wise as Fred Cole
- Peter Swanwick as Mr Parfitt
- Betty Hardy as Mrs Parfitt
- Roger Maxwell as Chief Steward
- Arthur Lovegrove as valet
- Tom Walls Jr. as starter
- Frederick Piper as miner
- Harry Locke as lorry driver
- Tony Sympson as musician
- Dudley Jones as publican
- Lucy Griffiths as maid
- George Rose as blacksmith

== Production ==
The film was made at Beaconsfield Studios with sets designed by Michael Stringer.

== Reception ==
The Monthly Film Bulletin wrote: "For over half its length Devil on Horseback appears as a routine racing film, with no more than the excitements inevitable in the theme. Then, after a half-fantastic scene between the drunken Irishman and the boy, the film concentrates on the breaking-in of Moppy, which it does very well, capturing with remarkable success the sharpness of misery which is only possible at fourteen. The superiority of the latter part of the film is due largely to Jeremy Spenser's greater aptitude for more emotional acting; the earlier scenes are weakened by his inability to make the boy both cocksure and sympathetic. As the emotional hub of the film, the scene between Moppy and O'Hara under the street lamp might have been a moment of high fantasy, had it not been allowed to run on after the emotional impact had been achieved. The faking of the racing scenes is at times uncomfortably apparent; but the almost documentary re-creation of the atmosphere of the training stables and the morning runs on the heath is strikingly successful."

Kine Weekly wrote: "Wholesome, uninhibited racing melodrama, set in authentic and picturesque surroundings ... The picture covers a lot of territory and carries quite enough weight, but, although it puffs a bit as it reaches the straight, it seldom relxes its grip on its audience and ends in grand style."

Leonard Maltin called it an "inconsequential racing yarn."

The Radio Times said, "it's strong on atmosphere and story. Sadly, the film suffers from lack of pace, disappointing racing sequences and an overdose of sentimentality".

TV Guide called it a "good racetrack drama, with excellent performances all around."

In British Sound Films: The Studio Years 1928–1959 David Quinlan rated the film as "average", writing: "Slow, atmospheric racing drama, well acted; below par-racing sequences."

In British Cinema of the 1950s Harper and Porter write that the film was "marred by extremely poor back projection in the racing sequences".

== See also ==
- List of films about horses
- List of films about horse racing
