= The Missing Million =

- Directed by: Philip Brandon
- Written by: James Seymour
- Based on: The Missing Million by Edgar Wallace
- Produced by: Hugh Perceval
- Starring: Linden Travers; John Warwick; Patricia Hilliard; John Stuart
- Cinematography: Stephen Dade
- Edited by: Walter Jentzsch
- Music by: Percival Mackey
- Production company: Signet Films
- Distributed by: Associated British Film Distributors
- Release date: March 1942
- Running time: 84 minutes
- Country: United Kingdom
- Language: English

The Missing Million is a 1942 British crime film directed by Philip Brandon and starring Linden Travers, John Warwick and Patricia Hilliard. It was adapted by James Seymour from the 1923 novel The Missing Million by Edgar Wallace. A millionaire is persecuted by a criminal gang.

== Plot ==
When millionaire-about-town Rex Walton mysteriously vanishes on the eve of his wedding, a chain of strange, violent events is set in motion. Intrepid Joan Walton assists Inspector Dicker in the search for her brother. The main suspect is notorious criminal The Panda ("The Prince of Blackmailers").

== Production ==
The film was shot at the Riverside Studios in Hammersmith with sets designed by the art director Andrew Mazzei.

== Cast ==
- Linden Travers as Joan Walton
- John Warwick as Bennett
- Patricia Hilliard as Dora Coleman
- John Stuart as Inspector Dicker
- Ivan Brandt as Rex Walton
- Brefni O'Rorke as Michael Coleman
- Charles Victor as Nobby Knowles
- Marie Ault as Mrs Tweedle
- Valentine Dyall as Collett
- James Donald as police officer

== Critical reception ==
The Monthly Film Bulletin wrote: "Though the many twists and turns of the story are on the whole adequately directed, the film just lacks the speed and slickness of a really first-class thriller. Linden Travers and John Stuart play the parts of Joan Walton and the Scotland Yard detective with naturalness and ease, but Ivan Brandt and Patricia Hilliard as Rex Walton and Dora Coleman are at times a little melodramatic "

Kine Weekly wrote: "Though altogether too talkative to make an ideal screen medium, the film holds attention by keeping the audience guessing in the best Edgar Wallace tradition, and in preserving its secret for the surprise climax. Effective thrills come from a succession of murders, and broad comedy finds its place in the rather uneven development."

TV Guide called it a "routine second feature."

Noirish wrote, "This is a very, very workaday comedy thriller, with most of the action being played as light entertainment and one character—the tiresomely misogynistic safecracker Nobby Knowles (Victor)—being played strictly for laughs".
