= 1955 Guild of Television Producers and Directors Awards =

Television awards show

Guild of Television Producers and Directors Awards
- Date: 1955

Highlights
- Best Actor: Paul Rogers
- Best Actress: Googie Withers

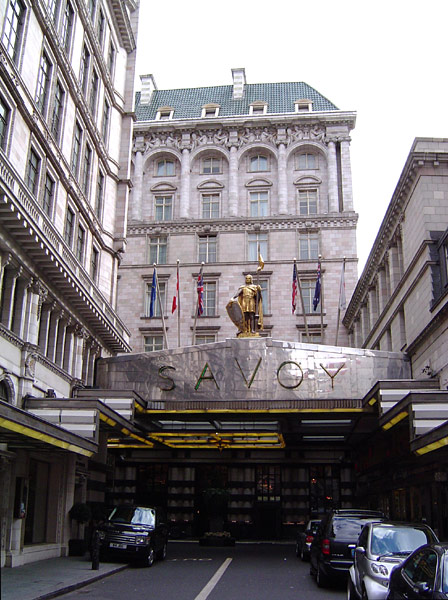

The 1955 Guild of Television Producers and Directors Awards were presented at the "Television Ball", held at the Savoy Hotel in London. They were the first major television awards of their kind in the United Kingdom. Following the Guild's merger with the British Film Academy they later became known as the British Academy Television Awards, under which title they are still given.

== Winners ==
- Actor
  - Paul Rogers
- Actress
  - Googie Withers
- Designer
  - Michael Yates
- Personality
  - Sir Mortimer Wheeler
- Production
  - Christian Sampson
- Writer
  - Iain McCormack
- Writers Award
  - Iain McCormack

== Sources ==
- Archive of winners on official BAFTA website (retrieved February 19, 2006).
- BAFTA entry at the Encyclopedia of Television (retrieved February 19, 2006).
