= J. Gunnis Davis =

British-born American actor and director (1873–1937)

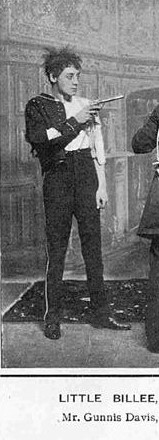
- Davis as "Little Billee" in Sheerluck Jones, or Why D’Gillette Him Off (1902)
- Born: James Gunnis Davis; 21 December 1873; Sunderland, County Durham, England
- Died: 23 March 1937 (aged 63); Los Angeles, California, U.S.
- Resting place: Hollywood Forever Cemetery
- Occupation: Actor
- Years active: 1901–1936
- Spouse: Mary Davis (m. 1902)
- Children: 1

James Gunnis Davis (21 December 1873 – 23 March 1937) was a British-born American actor and director who had a career in films in the US.

== Early life ==
He was born as Joseph Gunnis Davis on 21 December 1873 in Sunderland, the son of Janet (1845-1905) and Alfred Davis (1828-1899) and educated in London. He made his first appearance as an actor in 1876 age 3 years. In 1902 he married Mary Isabel née Michael in London. In 1904 he and his wife Mary moved to New York as stage manager for Charles Frohman and Henry W. Savage. In 1925 they became naturalized American citizens.

== Career ==
After a period treading the boards, including as Little Billee in the Sherlock Holmes parody Sheerluck Jones, or Why D’Gillette Him Off (1901), Davis entered the film world in 1912.

Davis in later life

Davis was best known for The Hazards of Helen (1914), but he appeared in 51 films, a number of stage productions, and has a significant number or directing credits, generally as James Davis. He played the auction clerk in Captain Blood (1935), Uncle Glutz in Bride of Frankenstein (1935), Secretary in The White Angel (1936) and Doctor in Show Boat (1936).

== Personal life and family ==
James Gunnis Davis belonged to the Troupers and the Veteran Thespians. He was of average height, 5 feet, 6 1/2 inches, with blue eyes and brown hair, weighing 112 pounds.

In 1902 in London Gunnis Davis married actress Mary Davis (professional name Miss Denton Garden) with whom he had one child, James Gunnis Davis (1906–1992). She had been married to the actor Spencer Trevor from 1897 to their divorce in 1901 as a result of her adultery with Gunnis Davis.

== Death ==
Davis died on 23 March 1937 at St. Vincent Hospital in Los Angeles after a brief illness following which the Troupers arranged his funeral at the Hollywood Forever Cemetery.

== Filmography ==
=== Stage ===
- Sheerluck Jones, or Why D’Gillette Him Off (1901)
- The Arcadians Time (1910)
- Alice in Wonderland (1915)

=== Selected filmography ===
- The Hazards of Helen (1915 – 1917)
- The Little Duchess (1917)
- Stolen Orders (1918)
- The Road to France (1918)
- The Rough Neck (1919)
- The Secret of the Hills (1921)
- A Certain Rich Man (1921)
- The Gray Dawn (1922)
- Refuge (1923)
- The Midnight Alarm (1923)
- Chastity (1923)
- Twinkletoes (1926)
- The Notorious Lady (1927)
- Captain Blood (1935)
- Show Boat (1936) as Doctor
