= The Missing Million (novel) =

1923 crime novel by Edgar Wallace

- 1955 reissue cover
- Author: Edgar Wallace
- Language: English
- Genre: Crime
- Publisher: John Long Limited
- Publication date: 1923
- Publication place: London, United Kingdom
- Media type: Print
- OCLC: 880122038

The Missing Million is a 1923 crime novel by the British writer Edgar Wallace.

"The Missing Million" centers around the disappearance of millionaire Rex Walton on the eve of his wedding. After Walton disappears, a chain of weird and violent events begin to occur.

== Film adaptation ==
In 1942 the novel was adapted into a British film of the same title starring Linden Travers and John Warwick.

== Bibliography ==
- Goble, Alan. The Complete Index to Literary Sources in Film. Walter de Gruyter, 1999.
