= She Couldn't Say No (1939 film) =

- Tommy Trinder and Fred Emney in the film
- Directed by: Graham Cutts
- Written by: Clifford Grey; Bert Lee; Elizabeth Meehan
- Based on: Funny Face; 1927 musical play by Paul Gerard Smith; Fred Thompson
- Produced by: Walter C. Mycroft
- Starring: Tommy Trinder; Fred Emney; Googie Withers
- Cinematography: Claude Friese-Greene
- Music by: Kenneth Leslie-Smith
- Distributed by: Pathé Pictures
- Release date: 20 April 1939
- Running time: 72 minutes
- Country: United Kingdom
- Language: English

She Couldn't Say No is a 1939 British comedy film directed by Graham Cutts and starring Tommy Trinder, Fred Emney and Googie Withers. It was written by Clifford Grey, Bert Lee and Elizabeth Meehan based on the 1927 play Funny Face by Paul Gerard Smith and Fred Thompson. A woman arranges a burglary to try to recover a stolen diary with compromising details written in it.

== Plot summary ==
Frankie and Dora Barnes live under the care of their guardian, Jimmy Reeves. Because Frankie is a compulsive liar, Jimmy locks away her diary the moment he discovers it. Desperate to retrieve it, Frankie convinces Peter Thurston, a young airman, to pull off a quick burglary to get it back. Peter and his friend Dugsie Gibbs break into the house on the night of Jimmy’s birthday party, unwittingly timing their break-in at the exact same moment as a pair of real thieves. The overlapping burglaries result in chaos. Fleeing the scene, Peter and Dugsie seek refuge in a nearby sanatorium, where staff mistake them for a doctor and a patient. The madness escalates when Frankie arrives disguised as a nurse, followed closely by the real burglars in their own disguises. Following a hectic climax, all the misunderstandings are resolved.

== Cast ==
- Tommy Trinder as Dugsie Gibbs
- Fred Emney as Herbert
- Googie Withers as Dora Barnes
- Greta Gynt as Frankie Barnes
- David Hutcheson as Peter Thurston
- Bertha Belmore as Dr. Grimstone
- Basil Radford as Lord Pilton
- Cecil Parker as Jimmy Reeves
- David Burns as Chester
- Wylie Watson as Thrumgood
- Doris Hare as Amelia Reeves
- Geoffrey Sumner as announcer

== Reception ==
The Monthly Film Bulletin wrote: "This thoroughly artificial and impossible plot has been used before. It is now embellished with various irrelevant episodes and incidents. The result is mildly amusing rather than hilariously funny. The cast work hard, but their material is inadequate. Tommy Trinder gives a characteristic performance, and Fred Emney supports him energetically. Googie Withers is well up to what is asked of her, but Greta Gynt seems a somewhat bewildered Frankie."

Kine Weekly wrote: "Even if the picture is a little thin and ingenuous in plot it should go down well at popular halls. Its fooling is of a broad variety and tuneful song numbers and a dance or two add to its mass appeal."

The Daily Film Renter wrote: "Slender narrative makes suitable vehicle for amiable fooling by Tommy Trinder and Fred Emney, while song and dance numbers are neatly introduced into general theme. Amusing situations provided by obvious complications of story."
