= Patricia Hilliard (actress) =

British actress (1916–2001)

- Born: 14 March 1916; Quetta, British India
- Died: 19 May 2001 (aged 85); Sussex, United Kingdom
- Other name: Patricia Maud Penn-Gaskell
- Occupations: Film actress Stage actress
- Years active: 1934–1942 (film)
- Spouse: William Fox (1938–2001) (her death) (2 children)
- Children: Alexandra Fox (b. 1940); Nicholas Fox (b. 1942)

Patricia Hilliard (born Patricia Maud Penn-Gaskell; 14 March 1916 – 19 May 2001), was a British stage and film actress.

== Biography ==
She was born at Quetta, then in British India, now in Pakistan, on 14 March 1916. She was the daughter of actress Ann Codrington (real name Marjorie Doris Codrington, who appeared in films such as The Rossiter Case) and her first husband, Percy Charles Penn-Gaskell, a military. Hilliard later adopted the last name of her stepfather, actor Stafford Hilliard. On 30 December 1915, her mother, while pregnant with Patricia, and her grandmother, Mrs. Helen Codrington, were aboard the British passenger liner SS Persia when it was sunk by German U-boat U-38 in the Mediterranean. Ann Codrington was one of only 15 surviving women; Helen Codrington did not survive.

Hilliard attended the Royal Academy of Dramatic Art in London, where her performance in Molière's Sicilien and her striking beauty led to a 2-year contract with Warner Brothers. After some modelling she appeared as an extra in Double Wedding (1933). She rapidly progressed, being the female lead in The Girl in the Crowd (1935) and René Clair's The Ghost Goes West (1935). She also appeared in Alexander Korda's Things to Come, based on H. G. Wells's novel. Her film career tailed off, but she continued to work on stage.

She married actor William Fox in 1938, with whom she had appeared on stage in William Congreve's Love for Love and the first production of J B Priestley's I Have Been Here Before (1937). She took a break between 1940 and 1944 following the birth of her first child and while her husband was on active military service in World War II, returning to the stage in 1944. In 1952 she joined the BBC's repertory company, before retiring in the early 1960s.

== Filmography ==
| Year | Title | Role | Notes |
|---|---|---|---|
| 1934 | The Private Life of Don Juan | The Girl at the Castle, a Young Girl in Love | |
| 1935 | Full Circle | Jeanne Westover | |
| 1935 | The Girl in the Crowd | Marian | |
| 1935 | The Ghost Goes West | Shepherdess | |
| 1936 | Things to Come | Janet Gordon | |
| 1936 | The Limping Man | Gloria Paget | |
| 1937 | Farewell Again | Nurse Ann Harrison | |
| 1938 | Night Journey | Mary Prentice | |
| 1939 | A Gentleman's Gentleman | Judy | |
| 1940 | Shadowed Eyes | Dr. Diana Barnes | |
| 1942 | The Missing Million | Dora Coleman | |

== Bibliography ==
- Low, Rachael. History of the British Film, 1918–1929. George Allen & Unwin, 1971.
