= A Boy, a Girl and a Bike =

1949 British film by Ralph Smart

- British quad poster
- Directed by: Ralph Smart
- Screenplay by: Ted Willis
- Story by: Ralph Keene & John Sommerfield
- Produced by: Ralph Keene; Alfred Roome
- Starring: John McCallum; Honor Blackman; Patrick Holt; Diana Dors
- Cinematography: Ray Elton; Phil Grindrod
- Edited by: James Needs
- Music by: Kenneth Pakeman
- Production company: Gainsborough Pictures
- Distributed by: General Film Distributors (UK)
- Release date: 23 May 1949 (UK)
- Running time: 92 minutes
- Country: United Kingdom
- Language: English
- Box office: £61,000 (by 1953)

A Boy, a Girl and a Bike is a 1949 British romantic comedy film directed by Ralph Smart and starring John McCallum, Honor Blackman and Patrick Holt, with art direction by George Provis. The screenplay was by Ted Willis. The film is set in Wakeford and in the Yorkshire Dales and features cycle sabotage and cycling tactics.

== Plot ==
Young couple Sue and Sam are members of a Yorkshire cycling club, the Wakeford Wheelers. Romantic complications ensue when wealthy David becomes smitten with Sue and joins the club to pursue her, much to Sam's dismay.

== Cast ==
- John McCallum as David Howarth
- Honor Blackman as Susie Bates
- Patrick Holt as Sam Walters
- Diana Dors as Ada Foster
- Maurice Denham as Bill Martin
- Leslie Dwyer as Steve Hall
- Anthony Newley as Charlie Ritchie
- Megs Jenkins as Nan Ritchie
- John Blythe as Frank Martin
- Hal Osmond as Mr. Bates
- Thora Hird as Mrs. Bates
- Amy Veness as Grandma Bates
- Maggie Hanley as Ginger
- Cyril Chamberlain as Bert Gardner
- Barry Letts as Syd
- Vera Cook as Helen Gardner
- Julien Mitchell as Mr. Howarth
- Alison Leggatt as Mrs. Howarth
- Lyn Evans as Policeman in Cafe
- Margot Bourke as Mary Bates
- Geoffrey Best as Harry
- John Howlett as Alf Pearson
- Patrick Halstead as Willie
- Joan Seton as Beryl Howarth
- Dennis Peck as Norman Bates
- Vera Williams as Jill Bates
- Bernard Hepton as Cyclist
- Gerald Lawson as Dog Seller
- Barbara Murray
- Valerie Pearson as Cyclist
- Charles Saynor as Policeman
- Marianne Stone
- Ben Williams as New Houseowner
- Jimmy Savile as Cyclist (uncredited)

== Production ==
The film is based on an original idea by Sydney Box, who was head of production at Gainsborough. Box devised the idea while out for a Sunday drive and assigned the script to Ted Willis, who had worked for Box on the scripts for Holiday Camp and The Huggetts Abroad. Willis had a reputation as a skilled writer for working-class characters. The film was originally titled Wheels Within Wheels.

Richard Attenborough was meant to play a key role but was busy making The Guinea Pig, so Patrick Holt played his part instead.

In March 1948, Smart scouted locations in Yorkshire and filming took place in September 1948 at Lime Grove Studios as well as on location in Yorkshire at places including Wakefield, Hebden Bridge, Skipton and Malham Cove.

== Reception ==
Variety called the film "feeble ... valueless for the US market." The Monthly Film Bulletin called it a "simple unpretentious story enlivened by flashes of homely Yorkshire humour." Leslie Halliwell said: "Mild comedy drama with the advantage of fresh air locations."

In British Sound Films: The Studio Years 1928–1959 David Quinlan rated the film as "average", writing: "Homespun humour and romance, with a variety of accents from the Rank Charm School." The Radio Times Guide to Films gave the film 2/5 stars, writing: "A minor, good-natured British comedy romance ... The cosy enterprise demonstrates why, with certain superior exceptions, the public preferred American films."

== Bibliography ==
- Spicer, Andrew. Sydney Box. Manchester University Press, 2006.
