= A Gentleman's Gentleman =

- Feature in The Daily Film Renter (19 April 1939)
- Directed by: Roy William Neill
- Written by: Philip MacDonald; Elizabeth Meehan; Austin Melford
- Produced by: Jerome Jackson
- Starring: Eric Blore; Marie Lohr; Peter Coke; Patricia Hilliard
- Cinematography: Basil Emmott
- Music by: Bretton Byrd
- Production company: First National Pictures
- Distributed by: Warner Brothers
- Release date: May 1939
- Running time: 70 minutes
- Country: United Kingdom
- Language: English

A Gentleman's Gentleman is a lost 1939 British comedy film directed by Roy William Neill and starring Eric Blore, Marie Lohr and Peter Coke. It was written by Elizabeth Meehan and Austin Melford based on a play by Philip MacDonald, and made at Teddington Studios.

== Preservation status ==
The British Film Institute has classed A Gentleman's Gentleman as a lost film. Its National Archive holds a collection of stills but no film or video materials.

== Plot ==
Judy, a young girl, accompanies elderly Magnus Pomeroy to a New Year's dance at the Albert Hall. When Pomeroy faints, Judy believes he has died. Fellow-partygoers Tony and Bassy, and Tony's "gentleman's gentleman" Hepplewhite, come to help. When Hepplewhite realizes that Pomeroy is alive, he keeps this to himself, and offers to dispose of the "body", for a suitable sum.

== Cast ==
- Eric Blore as Heppelwhite
- Marie Lohr as Mrs Handside-Lane
- Peter Coke as Tony
- Patricia Hilliard as Judy
- David Hutcheson as Bassy
- David Burns as Alfred
- Wallace Evennett as Magnus Pomeroy
- C. Denier Warren as Doctor Botto

== Reception ==
The Monthly Film Bulletin wrote: "Eric Blore's elaborate interpretation of Heppelwhite is utterly incongruous with his role and hardly lends itself to the comic. David Burns as Heppelwhite's accomplice is more funny with his Bowery philosophy and tomfooleries."

The Daily Film Renter wrote: "Presented on broad lines, subject resorts to conventional farce but fails to achieve requisite degree of humour. Production values, however, quite adequate, and subject ranks as fair offering for the masses. ... Eric Blore, while giving a competent portrayal as the unscrupulous butler, is by no means strong enough to carry the picture. Marie Lohr deserves a better part than that of the wealthy widow, Peter Coke and Patricia Hilliard are a pleasant romantic team."

Kine Weekly wrote: "Artless but amiable farcical comedy depicting the adventures and misadventures of a blackmailing butler. Most of the twists are theatrical, but Eric Blore is equal to every emergency in the name part. He guides the ingenuous humour into popular channels. Support is eager and presentation is colourful, if not always convincing. ...The story is not strikingly original, but it at least gives Eric Blore his head, and he takes the bit between his teeth in no uncertain manner. He alone brings a reasonable quota of laughs to the time-honoured set of complications."

Picturegoer wrote: "Eric Blore's well-known mannerisms are well to the fore in an enthusiastically acted, if theatrical comedy."
