= Shadowed Eyes =

1940 film

- Patricia Hilliard and Basil Sydney in the film
- Directed by: Maclean Rogers
- Written by: Roy Carter; Herbert Hill; Arnold Ridley
- Produced by: A. George Smith; Kurt Sternberg
- Starring: Basil Sydney; Patricia Hilliard; Stewart Rome
- Cinematography: Geoffrey Faithfull
- Production companies: George Smith Productions; Savoy Productions
- Distributed by: RKO Pictures
- Release date: 2 March 1940
- Running time: 68 minutes
- Country: United Kingdom
- Language: English
- Budget: £19,441

Shadowed Eyes is a 1940 British crime film directed by Maclean Rogers and starring Basil Sydney, Patricia Hilliard and Stewart Rome. It was written by Roy Carter, Herbert Hill and Arnold Ridley, and was produced at Isleworth Studios in London as a quota quickie for distribution by RKO Pictures.

== Preservation status ==
The British Film Institute National Archive holds a collection of stills but no film or video materials.

== Plot ==
Famous surgeon Emil Zander murders his wife’s lover during a mental blackout. Convicted but deemed insane, he is sent to a private research facility. When his assistant Diana’s father requires urgent eye surgery, his friends smuggle him out to perform it. After a brief, lapse into violence, Zander’s mind clears; he successfully operates, and Diana vows to help him rebuild his life.

== Cast ==
- Basil Sydney as Doctor Emil Zander
- Patricia Hilliard as Doctor Diana Barnes
- Stewart Rome as Sir John Barnes
- Ian Fleming as Doctor McKane
- Tom Helmore as Ian
- Dorothy Calve as Marjorie
- Ruby Miller as Mrs Clarke-Fenwick

== Reception ==
The Monthly Film Bulletin wrote: "Given a good script, direction and acting, this exceedingly far-fetched story might have managed to hold the interest. As it is, the script is atrocious, the direction pedestrian in the extreme and the acting very poor."

Kine Weekly wrote: "Good, honest melodrama straightforwardly told in a scientific-cum-medico atmosphere that cunningly amplifies the emotional significance of its eternal basic theme. The acting is equal to all demands and requirements and so is the direction. It is no mean woman's picture or, for that matter, man's."

The Daily Film Renter wrote: "Far-tetched narrative fails to convince and situations are overmelodramatic, but film may get by with not too critical patrons. ... Conviction can hardly be described as the production's strong point, many of the situations being of a highly theatrical nature, while the actors are hard put to it to infuse life into their characterisations. Basil Sydney plays the surgeon with polish, but cannot achieve reality. Patricia Hilliard is the heroine, Stewart Rome the barrister and lan Fleming another doctor, and all three, together with other supporting cast members, also suffer from unbelievable roles."
