= Jim Phelan (Irish writer) =

Irish writer (1895–1966)

- Jim Phelan, circa 1956
- Born: 1895; Ireland
- Died: 1966 (aged 70–71)
- Occupations: Writer, tramp
- Spouse(s): Dora Mary Brien, Jill Constance Hayes, Kathleen Newton
- Children: Catherine Mary, Seumas
- Writing career
- Genres: Prose, poetry
- Notable works: Tramp at Anchor, Lifer, Tramping the Toby

James Leo Phelan (1895–1966) was an Irish writer, political activist and tramp who wrote several books on tramp life and prison life.

== Prison ==
On the eve of his execution in 1924, the Home Secretary commuted his sentence to life imprisonment. He remained in prison for another 13 years before he was released, serving time in Maidstone, Parkhurst and Dartmoor prisons. He would later draw on these experiences for his several books on prison life.

Chess historian Edward Winter has discussed Phelan's interest in chess.

== Family life and death ==
Phelan's first wife was Dora, with whom he had a child, Catherine Mary, in 1922. Dora died in 1924. His second partner, Jill Hayes, was a young left-wing idealist who visited him in prison. They were married on his release in 1937, and had a son, Seumas. Hayes was injured in The Blitz in 1940 and died following a series of mental health problems which prompted Seumas, in his short story "Naughty Mans", to describe her as "lost in the war". Later, Phelan established a relationship with Kathleen Newton - they were married in 1944 - who helped raise the young Seumas, and who shared Phelan's unusual lifestyle.

In his book Tramping the Toby, Phelan wrote, "...one day Dylan Thomas sat down beside me, to drink black coffee at the Madrid in Soho. Next day I was a scriptwriter in a film company, with Dylan and the rest of the boys. Many of the films were about forestry-work, lorry-drivers, trawler men, and the like. I got out on the road a great deal, collecting material. It was the next thing to being a tramp – I had found the halfway house."

He died at his son's house in west London in 1966. Phelan was survived by both children and Kathleen. Kathleen died in 2014. Seumas died in Australia on 13 November 2016.

== Works ==
- Museum (1937) (US; reissued in the UK (1938) as Lifer; reprinted 1966)
- Ten-a-Penny People (1938)
- Green Volcano (1938)
- Meet the Criminal Class (1938)
- In the Can (1939)
- Jail Journey (1940)
- Churchill Can Unite Ireland (1940)
- Murder by Numbers (1941)
- Ireland- Atlantic Gateway (1941)
- And Blackthorns (1944)
- Banshee Harvest (1945)
- Moon in the River (1946)
- Turf Fire Tales (1947)
- The Name's Phelan (1948; Blackstaff Press, 1993]
- Bog Blossom Stories (1948)
- We Follow the Roads (1949)
- Vagabond Cavalry (1951)
- Wagon Wheels (1951)
- Tramp at Anchor (1954)
- Criminals in Real Life (1956)
- Fetters for Twenty (1957)
- Tramping the Toby (1958)
- The Underworld (1967)
- Nine Murderers and Me (1967)
