= Clarence Blakiston =

British film and stage actor (1864–1943)

Clarence Blakiston as Prince Badahur in The Blue Moon (1905)

Clarence Blakiston (23 April 1864 – 21 March 1943) was a British film and stage actor, comedian and singer who during his career across five decades played the title role in the Sherlock Holmes parody Sheerluck Jones, or Why D’Gillette Him Off at Terry's Theatre (1901–02) which ran for 138 performances and who appeared in the original production of The Admirable Crichton at the Duke of York's Theatre in 1902.

== Early life ==
He was born at Giggleswick in North Yorkshire in England, one of five children of Marie Jane née Simon (1825–1908) and John Richard Blakiston (1829–1917), HM Chief Inspector of Schools and Headmaster of Giggleswick School (1858–1866). In 1880 aged 16 Clarence Blakiston joined the Merchant Navy as an apprentice at Cardiff while in 1884 he was awarded a Certificate of Competency to serve as Second Mate. In 1888 he married Glasgow-born Clementina Lindsay née Low (1864–1936) and they had a daughter, Marie Blakiston (1889–1890).

== Stage career ==
Blakiston as Sheerluck Jones (right) in Sheerluck Jones, or Why D’Gillette Him Off – Tatler (1902)

After leaving the Merchant Navy Blakiston determined to try his hand at the theatre. His brief biography in The Play Pictorial review of The Blue Moon in 1905 recorded that:

Blakiston's first engagement was with a modern, but somewhat shady, repertoire Company whose manager cast him for juvenile lead, only because he possessed a presentable wardrobe. The thirsty members of the company were most eager to show him how his parts really should be played, but stipulated that the coaching was done in the nearest bar-parlour. Soon after joining, his manager called him aside and said, "My boy, you're too good for juveniles. When I see real talent I always help it on. I'll sacrifice myself by exchanging parts with you – I'll lend you my clothes (take care of them as it has taken me years to collect them), and you shall lend me yours." "Whereupon this gentleman" says Mr. Blakiston, "possessed himself of all my available suits and linen, and two weeks later gave me 12/- for two weeks' work, explaining with tears in his eyes that business was so bad owing to my inability to play such important parts. I never saw my clothes again. The manager's clothes (mostly rags) I sold for a few shillings, and got insulted over the transaction." After going through many vicissitudes Mr. Blakiston obtained an introduction to Mr. Edward Compton who engaged him as prompter, and thenceforth he worked his way up to the position of leading man, which position he retained for five years before trying his fate in town.

His stage roles included Chastelard in The Queen's Room (1891) at the Opera Comique; Harry Dornton in The Road to Ruin (1891) at the Opera Comique; Roger Conant in The Mayflower (1892); Captain Simmonds in Delia Harding (1895) at the Comedy Theatre; Mr Goldie in A Breezy Morning (1895) at the Comedy Theatre; Butler in The Manoeuvres of Jane at the Haymarket Theatre (1899); Stingo in She Stoops to Conquer (1900) at the Theatre Royal Haymarket; Mr Fenwick in The Second in Command (1900) at the Theatre Royal Haymarket; Captain Trent in The New Clown and Sheerluck Jones in the Sherlock Holmes parody Sheerluck Jones, or Why D’Gillette Him Off (1901) and Edgar Blatcher in A Tight Corner (1901) at Terry's Theatre; Harry Brandon in The Little French Milliner (1902) at the Avenue Theatre; John Treherne in The Admirable Crichton (1902) at the Duke of York's Theatre; Dr Topping in Little Mary (1903); Grieve in Du Barry (1905) at the Savoy Theatre; Sm in The Faddists (1905) at St James's Theatre; Prince Badahur Sanatsinjhi of Kharikar in The Blue Moon (1905) at the Lyric Theatre; Prince Hassan in A Persian Princess (1909) at the Queen's Theatre; Richard Gilder in Within the Law (1916) at the Theatre Royal in Melbourne in Australia and the same role at the Kingsway Theatre (1920); Dr Macfarlane in The Unknown by W. Somerset Maugham at the Aldwych Theatre (1920) starring Basil Rathbone and Lady Tree; Harding in Send for Dr. O'Grady (1923) at the Criterion Theatre; Sir Robert Shale in The Lie (1924) at the Regent Theatre, and Archbishop in High Treason at the Strand Theatre (1928).

== Film roles ==
Blakiston's film roles include Richard Gilder in the Australian film Within the Law (1916), M. Duval in The Lady of the Camellias (1922), Sir John Edmonds in Somebody's Darling (1925), Sir George Venning in Rogues of the Turf (1923), Henry Leslie in A Peep Behind the Scenes (1929), Mr Peabody in The Girl in the Crowd (1935), Love Up the Pole (1936), and the Duke of Sussex in Victoria the Great (1937).

By 1939 Clarence Blakiston was living in Ainsdale in Southport, Merseyside and here he died in 1943. In his will he left £221 3s 11d to Ellen Rosemary Blakiston.
