= Bill Shine (actor) =

British actor (1911–1997)

- Bill Shine (left) & Claude Hulbert in Take a Chance (1937)
- Born: Wilfred William Dennis Shine; 20 October 1911; London, England
- Died: 24 July 1997 (aged 85); Kensington, London, England
- Years active: 1929–1988

Wilfred William Dennis Shine (20 October 1911 – 24 July 1997) was a British theatre, film and television actor.

== Biography ==
Shine was born into a family of theatre actors; among others, Shine's father, mother, grandmother, two uncles and an aunt had worked in theatre. His father Wilfred Shine was a theatre actor who also appeared in films during the 1920s and the 1930s. Bill Shine made his film debut in 1929, since which he appeared in over 160 films and television series. Towards the end of his career, he was best known for playing Inventor Black on children's television series Super Gran. In series two, episode four of Mrs Thursday, "The Duke and I" (1967), he played the Duke of Midlothian.

== Selected filmography ==
* The Flying Scotsman (1929) – barman (uncredited)
- High Seas (1929) – minor role (uncredited)
- Under the Greenwood Tree (1929) – Leaf
- The Loves of Robert Burns (1930) – (uncredited)
- Harmony Heaven (1930) – rejected actor (uncredited)
- The Last Hour (1930) – Ben
- The Yellow Mask (1930) – Sunshine
- These Charming People (1931) – Ulysses Wiggins
- Many Waters (1931) – Registry Office junior clerk (uncredited)
- The Bells (1931)
- Money for Nothing (1932) – minor role (uncredited)
- Verdict of the Sea (1932) – Slim
- The Man from Toronto (1933) – butcher's delivery boy
- Waltzes from Vienna (1934) – Carl (uncredited)
- The Private Life of Don Juan (1934) – minor role (uncredited)
- My Old Dutch (1934) – Cousin Arry
- The Scarlet Pimpernel (1934) – an aristocrat (uncredited)
- It Happened in Paris (1935) – Albert (uncredited)
- Old Roses (1935) – minor role (uncredited)
- Late Extra (1935) – Fred (uncredited)
- Music Hath Charms (1935) – minor role (uncredited)
- It's a Bet (1935) – Arthur – citizen of Doveton (uncredited)
- Blue Smoke (1935) – Ted
- Gaol Break (1936)
- Find the Lady (1936) – (uncredited)
- Highland Fling (1936) – Lizards
- To Catch a Thief (1936) – (uncredited)
- Rembrandt (1936) – minor role (uncredited)
- Sensation (1936) – Quirk
- You Must Get Married (1937) – minor role (uncredited)
- Take a Chance (1937) – minor role (uncredited)
- The Compulsory Wife (1937) – minor role (uncredited)
- Strange Adventures of Mr. Smith (1937) – Rodney Broadbent
- Farewell Again (1937) – Cpl. Edrich
- Cotton Queen (1937) – telephone operator (uncredited)
- First Night (1937) – minor role (uncredited)
- The Squeaker (1937) – Alfie (uncredited)
- There Was a Young Man (1937) – minor role (uncredited)
- Dinner at the Ritz (1937) – minor role (uncredited)
- The Last Adventurers (1937) – Joe Hanson
- Young and Innocent (1937) – manager of Tom's Hat Cafe (uncredited)
- The Green Cockatoo (1937) – Lightning (uncredited)
- The Terror (1938) – (uncredited)
- You're the Doctor (1938) – (uncredited)
- His Lordship Goes to Press (1938)
- They Drive by Night (1938) – minor role (uncredited)
- The Villiers Diamond (1938) – Joe
- Second Thoughts (1938) – minor role (uncredited)
- Over the Moon (1939) – minor role (uncredited)
- The Face at the Window (1939) – Pierre, Babette's Beau
- Let George Do It! (1940) – untipped steward (uncredited)
- Crook's Tour (1940) – bit role (uncredited)
- Three Silent Men (1940) – bystander at accident (uncredited)
- Garrison Follies (1940) – minor role (uncredited)
- Spare a Copper (1940) – minor role (uncredited)
- Old Bill and Son (1941) – pub customer (uncredited)
- Inspector Hornleigh Goes To It (1941) – Hotel Porter
- Turned Out Nice Again (1941) – (uncredited)
- Champagne Charlie (1944) – Mogador Stage Manager
- Fiddlers Three (1944) – minor role (uncredited)
- For You Alone (1945) – captain (uncredited)
- Perfect Strangers (1945) – Webster
- Wanted for Murder (1946) – Det. Ellis
- Captain Boycott (1947) – press photographer (uncredited)
- Vice Versa (1948) – Lord Gosport
- The Red Shoes (1948) – her mate
- The Winslow Boy (1948) – Fred (uncredited)
- The Small Voice (1948) – Maitland
- Another Shore (1948) – Bats Vere-Brown
- Passport to Pimlico (1949) – Captain Willow
- Private Angelo (1949) – Col. Michael
- Under Capricorn (1949) – Mr. Banks
- The Chiltern Hundreds (1949) – reporter
- The Woman with No Name (1950) – Major
- Something in the City (1950) – reporter
- Old Mother Riley's Jungle Treasure (1950) – F / O Prang
- Talk of a Million (1951) – church groundsman – (uncredited)
- Scarlet Thread (1951) – Basil (uncredited)
- The Woman's Angle (1952) – (uncredited)
- Girdle of Gold (1952) – juror
- Never Look Back (1952) – Willie
- No Haunt for a Gentleman (1952) – minor role (uncredited)
- Mother Riley Meets the Vampire (1952) – Mugsy's assistant
- Love's a Luxury (1952) – Clarence Mole
- Hot Ice (1952)
- There Was a Young Lady (1953) – Charlie, Duke of Chiddingford
- Melba (1953) – minor role (uncredited)
- Innocents in Paris (1953) – customs officer (uncredited)
- The Clue of the Missing Ape (1953) – henchman in opening sequence (uncredited)
- Devil on Horseback (1954) – steward (at horseracing track)
- Knave of Hearts (1954) – pub barman (uncredited)
- Father Brown (1954) – minor role (uncredited)
- Knave of Hearts (1954) – Saxby
- Duel in the Jungle (1954) – Bill Shine (uncredited)
- Raising a Riot (1955) – Dotty (uncredited)
- As Long as They're Happy (1955) – P.C. Bowker (uncredited)
- Where There's a Will (1955) – porter
- John and Julie (1955) – car driver
- The Deep Blue Sea (1955) – Golfer
- The Gold Express (1955) – (uncredited)
- The Adventures of Quentin Durward (1955) – Trois-Eschelles
- Richard III (1955) – beadle
- An Alligator Named Daisy (1955) – minor role (uncredited)
- Not So Dusty (1956) – Alistair
- Women Without Men (1956) – reveller
- Bond of Fear (1956) – man hiker
- Blonde Bait (1956) – Lindbergh (uncredited)
- The Last Man to Hang (1956) – The Jury: Underhay
- Around the World in 80 Days (1956) – minor role (uncredited)
- The Tommy Steele Story (1957) – minor role (uncredited)
- High Flight (1957) – policeman
- The House in the Woods (1957) – Colonel Shellaby
- Blue Murder at St. Trinian's (1957) – policeman (uncredited)
- The Diplomatic Corpse (1958) – Humphrey Garrad
- The Man Inside (1958) – English husband
- Blow Your Own Trumpet (1958) – drummer (uncredited)
- Make Mine a Million (1959) – outside broadcast producer (uncredited)
- Idol on Parade (1959) – ticket collector
- Jack the Ripper (1959) – Lord Tom Sopwith
- Left Right and Centre (1959) – Centre – Basingstoke
- The Boy and the Bridge (1959) – bridge mechanic
- Libel (1959) – the guide
- Trouble with Eve (1960) – Alonzo, artist
- The Challenge (1960) – farm labourer
- Not a Hope in Hell (1960) – Pettigrew
- The Pure Hell of St Trinian's (1960) – usher
- Double Bunk (1961) – 2nd Thames conservancy officer
- The Rescue Squad (1963)
- The Yellow Rolls-Royce (1964) – minor role (uncredited)
- Joey Boy (1965) – ticket collector (uncredited)
- The Great St. Trinian's Train Robbery (1966) – minor role (uncredited)
- Bindle (One of Them Days) (1966) – man in country pub
- The Sky Bike (1967) – Wingco
- Not Tonight, Darling (1971) – Captain Harrison
- Burke & Hare (1971) – landlord
- The Jigsaw Man (1983) – commissionaire
