= Let Me Explain, Dear =

1932 British film by Gene Gerrard and Frank Miller

- Original poster ad
- Directed by: Gene Gerrard; Frank Miller
- Written by: Gene Gerrard; Frank Miller
- Based on: play by Walter Ellis
- Produced by: John Maxwell
- Starring: Gene Gerrard; Viola Lyel; Claude Hulbert
- Cinematography: Walter J. Harvey; Horace Wheddon
- Edited by: Bert Bates
- Music by: Idris Lewis
- Production company: British International Pictures
- Distributed by: Wardour Films
- Release date: 1 May 1933
- Running time: 75 minutes
- Country: United Kingdom
- Language: English

Let Me Explain, Dear is a 1932 British comedy film directed by Gene Gerrard and Frank Miller and starring Gerrard, Viola Lyel and Claude Hulbert. It was written by Gerrard and Miller adapted from the 1915 play A Little Bit of Fluff by Walter Ellis. It was made by British International Pictures.

== Plot summary ==
A man tries to fake an accident in order to claim insurance money, but things soon go awry.

== Cast ==
- Gene Gerrard as George Hunter
- Viola Lyel as Angela Hunter
- Claude Hulbert as Cyril Merryweather
- Jane Carr as Mamie
- Amy Veness as Aunt Fanny
- Henry B. Longhurst as Dr. Coote
- Hal Gordon as Parrott
- C. Denier Warren as jeweller
- Reginald Bach as taxi driver

== Reception ==
Kine Weekly wrote: "Boistrous farcical comely, suggested by the successful play A Liitle Bit of Fluff, which builds up its laughs with effortless ease from a brisk succession of hectic and hilarious marital complications. The spirit of true English farce is preserved by excellent team work and staging, and the result is capital light entertainment for all classes."

Picture Show wrote: "Sparkling and fast moving."
