= The Maid of the Mountains (film) =

1932 film

- Original trade ad poster
- Directed by: Lupino Lane
- Written by: Scenario: Victor Kendall; Frank Miller; Edwin Greenwood; Screen adaptation: Douglas Furber; Lupino Lane
- Based on: musical play by Frederick Lonsdale
- Produced by: John Maxwell
- Starring: Harry Welchman; Nancy Brown; Betty Stockfeld
- Cinematography: Claude Friese-Greene; Arthur Crabtree
- Edited by: Leslie Norman
- Music by: Harold Fraser-Simson; Lyricist: Harry Graham; Musical direction: Idris Lewis
- Production company: British International Pictures
- Distributed by: Wardour Films (UK)
- Release date: 19 September 1932
- Running time: 80 minutes
- Country: United Kingdom
- Language: English
- Box office: $500,000 (est. for UK)

The Maid of the Mountains is a 1932 British film directed by Lupino Lane and starring Nancy Brown, Harry Welchman and Betty Stockfeld. It was written byVictor Kendall, Frank Miller, Edwin Greenwood, Douglas Furber and Lane based on the long-running stage musical The Maid of the Mountains by Harold Fraser-Simson.

== Cast ==
- Nancy Brown as Teresa
- Harry Welchman as Baldasare
- Betty Stockfeld as Angela Malona
- Albert Burdon as Tonio
- Garry Marsh as Beppo
- Renee Gadd as Vittoria
- Wallace Lupino as Crumpet
- Dennis Hoey as Orsino
- Gus McNaughton as General Malona
- Val Guest as party guest

== Critical reception ==
Film Weekly wrote: "It has tuneful songs, effective comedy, and good backgrounds. A fine family picture, which is capital entertainment of its type. Wisely eschewing 'advanced' sreen treatment, Lupino Lane has concentrated on bringing out the straightforward singing, romance, and comedy of the original."

Kine Weekly wrote: "Goop popular entertainment, a picture which brings to the screen the spirit of clean, English musical comedy and presents it in a spectacular manner which should delight the majority. The original musical score has been employed, and the most famous numbers are retained and are well rendered, and there is plenty of humour and action to keep the entertainment alive. A film which not only deserves attention on its merits, but has unquestionable box-office pull."

Picture Show wrote: "The camera-work and recording are excellent and the players ... supply a really pleasing portrayal of the famous characters in this amusing musical play."

TV Guide wrote: "The production, unfortunately, is flat and lifeless, without any of the jauntiness needed for it to work."
