= Leave It to Me (1933 film) =

1933 film

- Feature on the film from Picture Show (26 August 1933)
- Directed by: Monty Banks
- Written by: Cecil Lewis; Frank Miller; Gene Gerrard
- Based on: Leave It to Psmith by Ian Hay & P.G. Wodehouse
- Produced by: John Maxwell
- Starring: Gene Gerrard; Olive Borden; Molly Lamont
- Cinematography: Claude Friese-Greene
- Edited by: Bert Bates
- Production company: British International Pictures
- Distributed by: Wardour Films
- Release date: April 1933
- Running time: 76 minutes
- Country: United Kingdom
- Language: English

Leave It to Me is a 1933 British comedy film directed by Monty Banks and starring Gene Gerrard, Olive Borden and Molly Lamont. It was written by Cecil Lewis, Frank Miller and Gerrard, adapted from the play Leave It to Psmith (1930) by Ian Hay and P.G. Wodehouse, itself based on Wodehouse's 1923 novel of the same title. It was made at Elstree Studios with sets designed by the art director David Rawnsley.

== Plot ==
Sebastian Help, an energetic entrepreneur running a help agency, agrees to stage a fake burglary for the Honorable Freddie, in order to collect a reward. Learning that the lovely Eve Halliday will be at Blandings Castle, the site of the heist, is an extra attraction. Posing as a poet, Sebastian stumbles into a plot by American crooks targeting the same necklace. He outwits the thieves, secures the jewels, and wins Eve's heart.

== Cast ==
- Gene Gerrard as Sebastian Help
- Olive Borden as Peavey
- Molly Lamont as Eve Halliday
- George K. Gee as Coots
- Gus McNaughton as Baxter
- Clive Currie as Lord Emsworth
- Toni Edgar-Bruce as Lady Constance
- Peter Godfrey as Siegffied Velour
- Syd Crossley as Beach
- Melville Cooper as the Honorable Freddie
- Wylie Watson as client

== Reception ==
Kine Weekly wrote: "It is very slight in plot, but allows for plenty of typical Gerrard humour and fooling which is thoroughly entertaining."

The Daily Film Renter wrote: "Obviously designed as a vehicle for the exploitation of Gene Gerrard's particular personality, this film should prove very acceptable to his legion of admirers. He is the life and soul of the picture, putting over numerous gags with slickness and efficiency."
