= Money for Nothing (1932 film) =

1932 film

- Directed by: Monty Banks
- Written by: Seymour Hicks; Victor Kendall; Walter C. Mycroft
- Produced by: John Maxwell
- Starring: Seymour Hicks] Betty Stockfeld; Edmund Gwenn
- Cinematography: Jack E. Cox
- Production company: British International Pictures
- Distributed by: Pathé Pictures
- Release date: 20 January 1932
- Running time: 72 minutes
- Country: United Kingdom
- Language: English

Money for Nothing is a 1932 British comedy film directed by Monty Banks and starring Seymour Hicks, Betty Stockfeld and Edmund Gwenn. It was written by Hicks, Victor Kendall and Walter C. Mycroft, produced by British International Pictures and shot at the company's Elstree Studios near London. A French-language remake, Love and Luck, also directed by Banks, premiered later in the year.

== Preservation status ==
The British Film Institute National Archive holds a collection of ephemera and stills but no film or video materials.

== Synopsis ==
The screenplay concerns a penniless gambler who is mistaken for a very wealthy man in Monte Carlo.

== Cast ==
- Seymour Hicks as Jay Cheddar
- Betty Stockfeld as Joan Blossom
- Edmund Gwenn as Sir Henry Blossom
- Donald Calthrop as manager
- Henry Wenman as Jay Cheddar
- Philip Strange as Jackson
- Amy Veness as Emma Bolt
- Charles Farrell as Digger
- Mike Johnson as waiter
- Hal Gordon as waiter
- Renee Gadd as maid

== Reception ==
Film Weekly wrote: "Seymour Hicks prances through his part in great form, making love – and making fortunes – with infectious enthusiasm. While he is not ideal as a 'silly ass' lover he certainly improves upon his performance in The Love Habit. Betty Stockfeld makes a suitable and not too girlish heroine, Renee Gadd acts brightly in the role of a lady's maid, and Edmund Gwenn works hard in a part which does not suit him too well. But Monty Banks, the director, is chiefly responsible for the brightness of the film as a whole."

Kine Weekly wrote: "A neat farcical comedy, which is put over with great gusto by Seymour Hicks, whose boundless energy and amazing volatility never allow the entertainment to flag. The story is bright and original, the supporting players are attractive and work hard, the dialogue is snappy, and has that essential touch of innocuous suggestiveness, while the production qualities are first-rate. Capital British comedy."

The Daily Film Renter wrote: "A farcical comedy by Seymour Hicks, with Seymour Hicks, and directed by Monty Banks. A triumph for both and for British International. ... Packed tight with comical farce situations, all done in the best Hicksian manner, and put through at a fast speed. An irresistible show which has its own way with the laughter apparatus."
