= Leslie Norman (director) =

English film director and screenwriter (1911–1993)

- Born: Leslie Armande Norman; 25 February 1911; Fulham, London, England
- Died: 18 February 1993 (aged 81); Knebworth, Hertfordshire, England
- Occupations: Director, producer, editor
- Years active: 1930 – 1978
- Military career
- Allegiance: United Kingdom
- Branch: British Army
- Service years: 1942–1945
- Rank: Major
- Service number: 238604
- Unit: Royal Army Ordnance Corps

Leslie Armande Norman (25 February 1911 – 18 February 1993) was an English film and television director, producer, editor, and screenwriter.

== Early life ==
Norman was born on 25 February 1911 at Shepherd's Bush, West London, to Jewish chiropodist Jacob Norman and Evelyn Maria (née Wootton).

Leaving school at 14, Norman worked in the film industry from the age of 16, working his way up from sweeper of the cutting-room floors at Ealing Studios to become an editor at 19.

=== Editor ===
Norman's early credits as editor were for British International. They included The Man from Chicago (1930), Compromising Daphne (1930), Fascination (1931) for director Miles Mander, Potiphar's Wife (1931) with Laurence Olivier for director Maurice Elvey, and Men Like These (1932) which he also co wrote.

Norman went on to edit Carmen (1932), Why Saps Leave Home (1932), Lucky Girl (1932), The Maid of the Mountains (1932), and the comedy Timbuctoo (1933). He did Red Wagon (1933) for director Paul L. Stein, Facing the Music (1933), and Over the Garden Wall (1934), then another with Stein, April Blossoms (1934) with Richard Tauber.

Norman edited I Spy (1934) for director Allan Dwan, then The Old Curiosity Shop (1934). He did several with Stein: Mimi (1935) for with Gertrude Lawrence, Heart's Desire (1935) with Tauber and Stein, and Viennese Love Song (1936) aka Faithful. There was also Regal Cavalcade (1935), The Perfect Crime (1937), Who Killed John Savage? (1937) with Elvey, and Glamour Girl (1938).

Norman edited an early movie for TV, The Case of the Frightened Lady (1938). Then he returned to features: They Drive by Night (1938), Everything Happens to Me (1938) for director Roy William Neill, and The Nursemaid Who Disappeared (1938) for Arthur Woods.

In 1939, prior to joining the British Army, Norman co-directed with Anthony Hankey the thriller Too Dangerous to Live starring Sebastian Shaw and Anna Konstam.

He returned to editing with Hoots Mon (1940) for Roy William Neil, and The Frightened Lady (1940). Norman's last editing credits before entering the services were The Prime Minister (1941) for Thorold Dickinson and This Was Paris (1942).

=== Second World War ===
In 1942 Norman was enlisted in the British Army rising to the rank of Major. In August 1945 he was deployed to Burma as part of a secret mission to test sonic warfare in the fight against the Japanese. This involved Norman and his platoon broadcasting the sound of troop movements in the Burmese jungle as a decoy to allow Allied troop movements to take place in what would otherwise have been fortified Japanese positions.

== Ealing ==
=== Return to editing ===
After the war Norman returned to editor on The Overlanders (1946) for Ealing. According to Norman director Harry Watt was not satisfied with the editing job done by Inman Hunter "so they asked me to take it over. I actually ripped it all apart and started over again. But I thought this could ruin Ted Hunter's career so I suggested they credit him as editor and I would take the title of supervising editor."

Ealing kept him on to edit The Life and Adventures of Nicholas Nickleby (1947) and Frieda (1947) for Basil Dearden.

=== Producer ===
Director Harry Watt had been impressed by the work Norman did on The Overlanders, so he took Norman with him to Australia to help with Eureka Stockade (1949). Norman was producer and editor.

Ealing promoted Norman to producer, on which he worked A Run for Your Money (1949) which he also co wrote. Norman went back to Australia to produce Bitter Springs (1950), written and directed by Ralph Smart. Like Eureka Stockade it was a box office disappointment.

Norman then went with director Henry Watt to Kenya where they made Where No Vultures Fly (1951); Norman was credited as producer and writer. It was a huge success. So too were the next two films Norman produced, both starring Jack Hawkins: Mandy (1952) and The Cruel Sea (1953).

Norman and Watt reunited with West of Zanzibar (1954) a sequel to Where No Vultures Fly, which was less popular.

== Director ==
Norman returned to directing with the thriller The Night My Number Came Up (1955), made for Ealing. He moved over to Hammer Film for who he made the sci-fi/horror movie X the Unknown (1956), replacing Joseph Losey at the last minute.

In 1952 Norman said he wanted to make A Town Like Alice, Robbery Under Arms and Come in Spinner in Australia. The first two movies were made without him but Norman went to Australia for Ealing again to make The Shiralee (1957) starring Peter Finch The movie was a success. Norman had another hit with the war movie Dunkirk (1958) starring John Mills and Richard Attenborough. It was one of the last movies made by Ealing, which soon wound up production.

Norman made another trip to Australia, to produce and direct an adaptation of the play Summer of the Seventeenth Doll (1959), for Hecht Hill Lancaster. The movie was not a success, critically or commercially. Filmink magazine argued:

Norman made a bunch of films in Australia as producer and/or director that, if flawed, were at least all tonally consistent: The Shiralee, Bitter Springs, Eureka Stockade. The Doll is all over the place in terms of tone. Norman was an effective director under the protective shield of Ealing Studios, but was out of his element tackling Hollywood studios. Richard Todd, who worked with Norman on The Long and Short and the Tall, called him 'a nice man but indecisive' and The Doll feels like it was made by a nice, indecisive person.

Norman directed an adaptation of The Long and the Short and the Tall (1961) for Michael Balcon's new company; it was commercially successful in England. Less well received were Spare the Rod (1961) with Max Bygraves and Mix Me a Person (1962) with Donald Sinden and Adam Faith.

=== Television career ===
In the 1960s, he worked as director on several notable British TV series including Gideon's Way (7 episodes), The Baron (3 episodes), The Champions, The Saint (21 episodes), The Avengers (2 episodes), My Partner the Ghost, Randall and Hopkirk (Deceased) (3 episodes), Department S (3 episodes), Shirley's World, The Persuaders! (6 episodes), The Pathfinders and Return of the Saint.

He started directing Hammer's The Lost Continent (1969) but was replaced during the shoot by Michael Carreras.

=== Retirement and death ===
Norman was forced into retirement after a laryngectomy for cancer in 1978. He died in Knebworth, Hertfordshire on 18 February 1993 at the age of 81 after suffering a seizure whilst driving near his home.

== Family ==
Norman's son, Barry, was a prominent UK film critic and broadcaster, whilst his daughter, Valerie, is a script editor and director.

== Selected filmography ==
=== Editor ===
- Potiphar's Wife (1931)
- Lucky Girl (1932)
- The Innocents of Chicago (1932)
- Red Wagon (1933)
- Facing the Music (1933)
- The Old Curiosity Shop (1934)
- I Spy (1934)
- Over the Garden Wall (1934)
- Heart's Desire (1935)
- Mimi (1935)
- Faithful (1936)
- Hoots Mon! (1940)
- The Prime Minister (1941)
- Frieda (1947)
- Eureka Stockade (1949)

=== Producer ===
- The Crash of Silence [Mandy in the UK] (1952)
- The Cruel Sea (1953)
- West of Zanzibar (1954)

=== Executive producer ===
- The Ivory Hunters [Where No Vultures Fly in the UK] (1951)

=== Director ===
==== Film ====
- Too Dangerous to Live (1939)
- The Night My Number Came Up (1955)
- X the Unknown (1956)
- The Shiralee (1957)
- Dunkirk (1958)
- Summer of the Seventeenth Doll (1959)
- Spare the Rod (1961)
- The Long and the Short and the Tall (1961)
- Mix Me a Person (1962)
- The Lost Continent (1968, uncredited)
- Sporting Chance (1975)

==== Television ====
- The Saint
  - "Paper Chase" (1966)
- Randall and Hopkirk (Deceased)
  - "A Sentimental Journey" (1968)
  - "It's Supposed to be Thicker than Water" (1968)
- The Persuaders!
  - "Anyone Can Play" (1971)
  - "The Old, the New and the Deadly" (1971)
  - "That's Me Over There" (1971)
  - "The Man in the Middle" (1971)
  - "Nuisance Value" (1972)
  - "The Morning After" (1972)
  - "A Death in the Family" (1972, uncredited)
