= Fascination (1931 film) =

1931 British drama film

- Directed by: Miles Mander
- Written by: Eliot Crawshay-Williams (play); Victor Kendall
- Produced by: Clayton Hutton
- Starring: Madeleine Carroll; Carl Harbord; Dorothy Bartlam
- Cinematography: Horace Wheddon; Willy Winterstein
- Edited by: Leslie Norman
- Music by: John Reynders
- Production company: British International Pictures
- Distributed by: Wardour Films
- Release date: 15 July 1931
- Running time: 70 minutes
- Country: United Kingdom
- Language: English

Fascination is a 1931 British drama film directed by Miles Mander and starring Madeleine Carroll, Carl Harbord and Dorothy Bartlam. It was made by British International Pictures at the company's Elstree Studios near London. The film's sets were designed by the art directors Clarence Elder and David Rawnsley.

It features minor performances from the future stars Freddie Bartholomew and Merle Oberon.

== Cast ==
- Madeleine Carroll as Gwenda Farrell
- Carl Harbord as Larry Maitland
- Dorothy Bartlam as Vera Maitland
- Kay Hammond as Kay
- Kenneth Kove as Bertie
- Louis Goodrich as Colonel Farrington
- Roland Culver as Ronnie
- Freddie Bartholomew as Child
- John Kove as Child
- Merle Oberon as Flower Seller
- Allison Van Dyke as Child

== Bibliography ==
- Low, Rachael. Filmmaking in 1930s Britain. George Allen & Unwin, 1985.
- Wood, Linda. British Films, 1927-1939. British Film Institute, 1986.
