= Bryan Langley =

English cinematographer (1909–2008)

- Born: John Bryan B. Langley; 29 December 1909; Fulham, London, England
- Died: 31 January 2008 (aged 98); United Kingdom
- Occupation: Cinematographer
- Years active: 1927–1981
- Father: Herbert Langley

John Bryan B. Langley (29 December 1909 – 31 January 2008) was an English cinematographer. Langley worked for a number of years with the British International Pictures organisation, but later worked at other studios including Gainsborough Pictures and Ealing. He was the son of opera singer and actor Herbert Langley.

== Selected filmography ==
- The Streets of London (1929)
- Number Seventeen (1932)
- Lucky Girl (1932)
- Letting in the Sunshine (1933)
- Facing the Music (1933)
- Blossom Time (1934)
- Music Hath Charms (1935)
- It's a Bet (1935)
- The Student's Romance (1935)
- Living Dangerously (1936)
- Royal Cavalcade (1936)
- The Limping Man (1936)
- Saturday Night Revue (1937)
- The Price of Folly (1937)
- French Leave (1937)
- The Lilac Domino (1937)
- Lassie from Lancashire (1938)
- Dead Men Tell No Tales (1938)
- Meet Mr. Penny (1938)
- The Gables Mystery (1938)
- Night Alone (1938)
- I Killed the Count (1939)
- The Dark Eyes of London (1939)
- Spare a Copper (1940)
- Room for Two (1940)
- Tower of Terror (1941)
- When the Bough Breaks (1947)
- The Phantom Shot (1947)

== Bibliography ==
- Low, Rachael. History of the British Film: Filmmaking in 1930s Britain. George Allen & Unwin, 1985.
