= Radio Parade =

1933 film

- Theatrical release poster
- Directed by: Richard Beville; Archie de Bear
- Written by: Paul England; Claude Hulbert
- Starring: Florence Desmond; Claude Hulbert; Jeanne de Casalis
- Cinematography: James Wilson
- Music by: Idris Lewis
- Production company: British International Pictures
- Distributed by: Wardour Films
- Release date: 29 May 1933
- Running time: 70 minutes
- Country: United Kingdom
- Language: English

Radio Parade (also known as Hello Radio) is a 1933 British musical comedy film directed by Richard Beville and Archie de Bear and featuring an ensemble cast including Florence Desmond, Claude Hulbert, Jeanne de Casalis and the comedy double act Clapham and Dwyer. A revue film, it was written by Paul England and Claude Hulbert and made by British International Pictures, who had produced the similarly formatted film Elstree Calling in 1930. It features many of the leading radio stars of the era. A further revue film, Radio Parade of 1935 (1934) followed.

== Preservation status ==
The British Film Institute National Archive holds the film.

== Synopsis ==
Christopher Stone links performances by a selection of variety artistes.

== Cast ==
- Doris Arnold as self, pianist
- Elsie Carlisle as self
- Charles Clapham as self
- Mabel Constanduros as Grandma Buggins
- Carlyle Cousins as themselves
- Jeanne de Casalis as Mrs. Feather
- Florence Desmond as self
- Bill Dwyer as self
- Roy Fox as self and his band
- Reginald Gardiner as self
- Leonard Henry as self
- Billie Houston as self
- Renée Houston as self
- Claude Hulbert as self
- Mario 'Harp' Lorenzi as self
- B.C. Hilliam as self
- Malcolm 'Mr. Jetsam' McEachern as self
- Tex McLeod as self
- Gus McNaughton as self
- Harry S. Pepper as self, pianist
- Stanelli as self
- Stainless Stephen as self
- Christopher Stone as self, disc jockey
- Doris Waters as Daisy
- Elsie Waters as Gert
- Keith Wilbur as self
- Hal Gordon as garage mechanic
- Eric Pavitt as boy
- Ernest Sefton as nightclub compere

== Reception ==
Film Weekly wrote: "It is little difficult to discuss Radio Parade as a film, because its makers have not tried to produce a film, in the ordinary sense, but have concentrated on the screen presentation of a 'super' radio-cum-television show. There is no story running through the 'turns' as in America's Big Broadcast. The items and artists on the programme are linked together only by the announcements of Christopher Stone, the gramophone specialist, and some comedy 'business' by Gus McNaughton and Claude Hulbert. ... One could hardly have a more comprehensive or more talented collection of radio stars."

Kine Weekly wrote: "Novel non-stop variety entertainment which marshals its talent from the famous stars of the ether. The many turns, all of which are known to the millions of listeners, are shuffled effectively and linked together with easy ingenuity. The showmanship displayed in the presentation of the film brings vaudeville entertainment at its best to the screen, and, with its ready-made public of wireless listeners, its obvious, exploitation angles have only to be exercised for big box office receipts to be assured."

== Bibliography ==
- Street, Seán. The A to Z of British Radio. Scarecrow Press, 2009.
- Wright, Adrian. Cheer Up!: British Musical Films 1929-1945. The Boydell Press, 2020.
