= Love at Second Sight (1934 film) =

1934 film

- Trade advertisement
- Directed by: Paul Merzbach
- Written by: Paul Merzbach; Harold Simpson; Frank Miller; Jack Davies
- Produced by: Julius Haimann
- Starring: Marian Marsh; Anthony Bushell; Claude Hulbert
- Cinematography: Jack E. Cox; Phil Grindrod
- Edited by: John Neill Brown
- Music by: Mischa Spoliansky
- Production company: Radius Films
- Distributed by: Wardour Films
- Release date: 21 March 1934
- Running time: 65 minutes
- Country: United Kingdom
- Language: English

Love at Second Sight (U.S. title: Girl Thief) is a 1934 British romantic comedy film directed by Paul Merzbach and starring Marian Marsh, Anthony Bushell and Claude Hulbert. It was written by Merzbach, Harold Simpson, Frank Miller and Jack Davies, and was shot at Elstree Studios in Hertfordshire as a quota quickie. The film's sets were designed by the art director David Rawnsley.

== Preservation status ==
The British Film Institute National Archive holds a collection of ephemera and stills but no film or video materials.

== Plot ==
Allan has invented the inexhaustible match, and hopes to sell his invention to Macintosh, the match magnate. He falls for Juliet, not knowing that she is Macintosh's daughter. He gets his friend Bill to write a song which will attract Juliet to him. When the song is broadcast, Juliet falls in love with Bill, not Allan.

== Cast ==
- Marian Marsh as Juliet
- Anthony Bushell as Bill
- Claude Hulbert as Allan
- Ralph Ince as Mackintosh
- Joan Gardner as Evelyn
- Stanley Holloway as PC
- Neil Kenyon as Uncle Angus
- E. Vivian Reynolds as butler
- John Singer as boy

== Reception ==
Kine Weekly wrote: "A romantic comedy with music which rather over-dresses its simple and not too well characterised story. Lack of proportionate balance, however, does not prevent many amusing situations visiting the development, and it is the manner in which they are handled by a sound Anglo-American cast that enables the film to build up adequate popular light entertainment. The songs are tuneful, and the treatment, even if rather ostentatious, is not without imagination and ideas."

The Daily Film Renter wrote: "Plot introduces light humorous incident, aided by pleasingly sung melodies, but general development slow and uneventful, with effective portrayals by leading players. ... This picture comprises nothing more than a very slender plot, bolstered up with occasional comedy incident and a few tuneful melodies. It is not the sort of thing to make any great demand on an audience, but the pleasant manner in which it moves, assisted by the acting, which in the main is in keeping with the easy nature of the story, help to make it agreeable material for the easy-to-please."
