= Potiphar's Wife (film) =

1931 film

- Nora Swinburne and Laurence Olivier in the film
- Directed by: Maurice Elvey
- Written by: Maurice Elvey; Victor Kendall; Edgar Middleton (play)
- Produced by: John Maxwell
- Starring: Nora Swinburne; Laurence Olivier; Guy Newall
- Cinematography: James Wilson
- Edited by: Leslie Norman
- Production company: British International Pictures
- Distributed by: First National-Pathé Pictures
- Release date: 2 April 1931
- Running time: 79 minutes
- Country: United Kingdom
- Language: English

Potiphar's Wife (also known as Her Strange Desire) is a 1931 British romance film directed by Maurice Elvey and starring Nora Swinburne, Laurence Olivier and Guy Newall. It was written by Elvey and Victor Kendall based on the 1927 play of the same title by Edgar C. Middleton. It was made at Elstree Studios with sets were designed by Clarence Elder.

== Plot ==
Lady Diana Bromford is an idle, spoiled but neglected wife. When she makes advances to her chauffeur, Straker, she is rejected, and in retaliation she falsely accuses him of assault. Straker is charged and put on trial, but when Lady Diana breaks down under cross-examination, the case is halted.

== Cast ==
- Nora Swinburne as Lady Diana Bromford
- Laurence Olivier as Straker
- Norman McKinnel as Lord Bromford
- Guy Newall as Maurice Worthington
- Donald Calthrop as Counsel for Defense
- Ronald Frankau as Major Tony Barlow
- Betty Schuster as Rosita Worthington
- Marjorie Brooks as Sylvia Barlow
- Walter Armitage as Geoffrey Hayes
- Henry Wenman as Stevens
- Gibb McLaughlin as chauffeur
- Elsa Lanchester as Therese
- Henry Vibart as Judge

== Reception ==
The Daily Film Renter wrote: "Direction is very uneven, some characterisations being clever and others crude, with some rather unconvincing incident."

Picture Show wrote: "Slow at first, the scenes in the courtroom when the chauffeur stands trial possess dramatic suspense. Competently acted and staged. "

== See also ==
- Potiphar's wife
