= Violet Farebrother =

English actress (1888–1969)

- 1936 Spotlight photo
- Born: 22 August 1888; Grimsby, Lincolnshire, England
- Died: 27 September 1969 (aged 81); Eastbourne, Sussex, England
- Occupation: Actress
- Years active: 1907–1965

Violet Farebrother (22 August 1888 – 27 September 1969) was an English actress. She appeared in 25 films between 1911 and 1965, including three films directed by Alfred Hitchcock. She was born in Grimsby, Lincolnshire, and died in Eastbourne, Sussex.

On stage from 1907, her theatre work included touring with Frank Benson's company, and playing Gertrude opposite Donald Wolfit's Hamlet on Broadway.

== Selected filmography ==
- Downhill (1927)
- Easy Virtue (1928)
- Murder! (1930)
- At the Villa Rose (1930)
- Enemy of the Police (1933)
- This Acting Business (1933)
- Nine Forty-Five (1934)
- The Office Wife (1934)
- It's a Bet (1935)
- Where's Sally? (1936)
- Mr. Cohen Takes a Walk (1936)
- The Pearls of the Crown (1937)
- Change for a Sovereign (1937)
- It's Not Cricket (1937)
- The Voice Within (1946)
- Cup-tie Honeymoon (1948)
- The Woman for Joe (1955)
- Man of the Moment (1955)
- Fortune Is a Woman (1957)
