= It's a Bet =

1935 film

- Opening titles
- Directed by: Alexander Esway
- Written by: Marcus McGill (novel); Frank Miller; L. du Garde Peach; Curt Siodmak
- Produced by: Walter C. Mycroft
- Starring: Gene Gerrard; Helen Chandler; Judy Kelly
- Cinematography: Bryan Langley
- Music by: Idris Lewis
- Production company: British International Pictures
- Distributed by: Wardour Films
- Release date: 1935
- Running time: 69 minutes
- Country: United Kingdom
- Language: English

It's a Bet (also known as Safe Bet) is a 1935 British comedy drama film directed by Alexander Esway and starring Gene Gerrard, Helen Chandler and Judy Kelly. It was written by Frank Miller, L. du Garde Peach and Curt Siodmak based on a novel by Marcus McGill.

== Synopsis ==
Young English reporter Rollo Briggs makes a bet with wealthy newspaper proprietor Norman that he can disappear completely for a month. Norman makes much of Briggs's mysterious disappearance in an attempt to boost the circulation of his newspaper.

== Cast ==
- Gene Gerrard as Rollo Briggs
- Helen Chandler as Clare
- Judy Kelly as Anne
- Allen Vincent as Norman
- Dudley Rolph as Harry
- Nadine March as Mis Parsons
- Polly Ward as Maudie
- Alf Goddard as Joe
- Jimmy Godden as Mayor
- Frank Stanmore as tramp
- Ronald Shiner as fair man
- Ellen Pollock as Mrs. Joe
- Violet Farebrother as Lady Allway
- George Zucco as convict
- Raymond Raikes
- Syd Crossley
- Charlotte Parry

== Production ==
The film was made at Elstree Studios by British International Pictures, with sets designed by the art director David Rawnsley.

== Reception ==
The Daily Film Renter wrote: "Escapades make comedy itinerary through country and seaside. Rural beauty forms natural background to series of farcical tight corners and hectic pursuits. Dashing performance from Gene Gerrard is highlight of swiftly moving laughter maker, which should prove popular attraction at most halls."

Picturegoer wrote: "The American actress, Helen Chandler, is colourless as Clare, but the supporting cast is very good. The story allows for English countryside backgrounds of a very pleasant character. Indeed, one of the best features of the picture is its strong pictorial appeal. Situations are neatly contrived and while the humour is not of the whirlwind variety it entertains in a breezy and engaging manner."

Picture Show wrote: "Gerrard as Rollo proves quite amusing at times, but does not reach his usual standard. Judy Kelly as Anne is good. Allen Vincent as Norman, the newspaper editor, plays the part quite well. Fairly amusing, but on the slow side."
