= Josser Joins the Navy =

1932 film

- Trade Show advertisement from The Daily Film Renter, 17 March 1932
- Directed by: Norman Lee
- Written by: Herbert Sargent; Con West
- Produced by: Norman Lee
- Starring: Ernie Lotinga; Cyril McLaglen; Jack Hobbs
- Production company: British International Pictures
- Distributed by: Wardour Films
- Release date: 18 March 1932
- Running time: 69 minutes
- Country: United Kingdom
- Language: English

Josser Joins the Navy (also known as Josser at Sea) is a 1932 British comedy film directed by Norman Lee and starring Ernie Lotinga, Cyril McLaglen and Jack Hobbs. It was written by Herbert Sargent and Con West made at Elstree Studios by British International Pictures. It was one of a series of films featuring Lotinga in his Josser character.

== Plot ==
International spies have stolen a secret formula and hotel porter Jimmy Josser sets out to recover it. This involves him joining the Navy, but unable to keep discipline, he is court-martialed. He escapes confinement and retrieves the formula.

== Cast ==
- Ernie Lotinga as Jimmy Josser
- Cyril McLaglen as Langford
- Jack Hobbs as Lt. Cmdr. Cole
- Lesley Wareing as Lesley Beauchamp
- Renee Gadd as Polly
- Jack Frost as Spud
- Harold Saxon-Snell as Ling Foo
- Charles Paton as Prof. Black
- Florence Vie as Mrs. Black
- Leslie Stiles as Admiral

== Reception ==
Film Weekly wrote: "Some ever-popular gags peer out of the slight plot in this burlesque and Josser, alias Ernest Lotinga, puts them over with a gusto in which a large slice of his own enjoyment will be shared by audiences who relish broad comedy. Nobody is ever likely to accuse Lotinga of being too subtle, and here, once again, he fools his way through a disconnected story in the music-hall manner in which he has no peer. ... Not for the sophisticated – but those who laugh easily will laugh a lot."

The Daily Film Renter wrote: "Those who like Lotinga's style will find something to amuse them, no doubt; but, in general, the film's appeal is to quite unsophisticated audiences. Plot is negligible, being merely a string on which to hang old-style music-hall humour."

Kine Weekly wrote: "A robust, nautical comedy, a tupical Lotinga offering, which depends upon the star's broad gags, ripe innuendoes and breezy rough stuff for its entertainment. This is not the fare for the better-class patrons, but the masses will no doubt find the picture to their liking, and it should do weli in populous areas. ... The star works hard, and although his humour comes dangerously near the border line, he holds the comedy together and invests it with a definite mass appeal."
