= Renee Gadd =

British actress (1906–2003)

- Born: Renee Gertrude Gadd; 22 June 1906; Bahía Blanca, Argentina
- Died: 20 July 2003 (aged 97); Hove, England
- Other name: Renée Gadd
- Occupation: Film actor
- Years active: 1932 - 1956
- Spouses: Guy Tooth (m. 1929, divorced) Henry Hardman (m. 1947, divorced) Joe Wilson (m. 1950)

Renee Gertrude Gadd (22 June 1906 – 20 July 2003) was an Argentine-born British film actress. She acted mostly in British films.

== Early life ==
Gadd was born on a ranch in Bahía Blanca, Argentina in 1908 to immigrants from Jersey. Her father, Talbot Gadd, was a railway executive who abandoned the family, after which they moved to England in 1913. Gadd lived with her aunt and began to study dancing, working as a chorus girl in Brighton by the age of fourteen. In 1924, she was cast in a production of Hassan by the powerful theatrical agent Basil Dean, after which she appeared in several musical comedies, then straight plays after becoming a member of a Shakespearian company at Stratford-on-Avon. She enjoyed a series of successful West End roles. During this same period she acted, and had an affair, with Fred Astaire.

== Film career ==
In 1931, Gadd signed a contract with British International Pictures and spent two years making films for them. Finding the various comedy films she was cast in uninspiring she behaved uncooperatively until she was released from her contract. In 1932, while working on the crime film White Face she began a tempestuous affair with her co-star Hugh Williams. When her contract with British International expired in 1934 she followed Williams who had gone to Hollywood, but found he had a new lover. She appeared opposite him in the 1935 film David Copperfield, but returned to Britain the following year. Her career began to tail off and she appeared mostly in quota quickies and small roles in minor productions for the remainder of her career. Her final appearance was in the 1950 Ealing Studios film The Blue Lamp.

== Personal life and death ==
Gadd married her first husband Guy Tooth, the youngest son of a family of Cork Street art dealers, in Westminster, in 1929. In 1932, Gadd began an affair with the actor Hugh Williams, which lasted until 1934, spelling the end of her marriage. In 1947, she married wealthy septuagenarian Henry "Harry" Hardman, a relationship that would also prove to be short-lived. Her third and final marriage was to insurance manager Joe Wilson in 1950. After his death, she settled in Hove in East Sussex, where she died aged 97.

== Partial filmography ==
- Money for Nothing (1932) - Maid
- Josser Joins the Navy (1932) - Polly
- Aren't We All? (1932) - Kitty Lake
- The Bad Companions (1932) - Josie
- White Face (1932) - Janice Harman
- The Maid of the Mountains (1932) - Vittoria
- His Wife's Mother (1932) - Tony
- Happy (1933) - Pauline
- Letting in the Sunshine (1933) - Jane
- Uncertain Lady (1934) - Myra Spaulding
- The Love Captive (1934) - Valerie Loft
- David Copperfield (1935) - Janet
- The Crimson Circle (1936) - Millie Macroy
- Where's Sally? (1936) - Sally
- Tomorrow We Live (1936) - Patricia Gordon
- The Man in the Mirror (1936) - Miss Blake
- The Man Who Made Diamonds (1937) - Marianne
- Clothes and the Woman (1937) - Schoolmistress
- Brief Ecstasy (1937) - Marjorie
- Under a Cloud (1937) - Judy St. John
- Meet Mr. Penny (1938) - Mrs. Brown
- Murder in Soho (1939) - Woman in Police Station
- Unpublished Story (1942) - Miss Hartley
- They Came to a City (1944) - Mrs. Stritton
- Dead of Night (1945) - Mrs. Craig (segment "Linking Story")
- Frieda (1946) - Mrs. Freeman
- Good-Time Girl (1948) - Mrs. Parsons
- The Blue Lamp (1950) - Woman Driver (uncredited)

== Citations ==
- The Stage, "Obituaries", 7 August 2003, p. 21

== Bibliography ==
- Sweet, Matthew. Shepperton Babylon: The Lost Worlds of British Cinema. Faber and Faber, 2005.
