= Out of the Blue (1931 film) =

1931 British musical film

- Opening titles
- Directed by: Gene Gerrard
- Screenplay by: Bert Lee; Frank Miller; R.P. Weston
- Based on: Little Tommy Tucker; 1930 play by Desmond Carter and Caswell Garth
- Produced by: John Maxwell
- Starring: Gene Gerrard; Jessie Matthews; Kay Hammond
- Cinematography: Arthur Crabtree; Ernest Palmer
- Edited by: Edward B. Jarvis
- Music by: Vivian Ellis
- Production company: British International Pictures
- Distributed by: Pathé Pictures International
- Release date: 5 November 1931
- Running time: 88 minutes
- Country: United Kingdom
- Language: English

Out of the Blue is a 1931 British musical film directed by Gene Gerrard and starring Gerrard, Jessie Matthews, and Kay Hammond. It was written by Bert Lee, Frank Miller and R.P. Weston based on the 1930 play Little Tommy Tucker by Desmond Carter and Caswell Garth. Produced by British International Pictures at Elstree Studios near London, its sets were designed by art director David Rawnsley. The plot follows a baronet’s daughter who falls in love with a radio star engaged to her sister.

It marked Matthews’ first major film role. Although the film was not a commercial success, it led to Matthews being cast in There Goes the Bride (1932) and signing a contract with Gainsborough Pictures. Matthews later reflected in her autobiography that "Out of the Blue was adapted from a stage musical and never should have left the boards." John Orton served as supervising director.

== Plot ==
Tommy Tucker, an impoverished aristocrat’s daughter, is in love with radio announcer Bill Coverdale, but he is engaged to her glamorous sister Angela, whom he does not love. Seeking a fresh start and an escape from her life of genteel poverty, Tommy leaves for Biarritz to pursue work as a nightclub singer.

== Cast ==
- Gene Gerrard as Bill Coverdale
- Jessie Matthews as Tommy Tucker
- Kay Hammond as Angela Tucker
- Kenneth Kove as Freddie
- Binnie Barnes as Rosa
- David Miller as Sir Jeremy Tucker
- Fred Groves as Bannister Blair
- Averil Haley as Judy Blair
- Hal Gordon as Videlop
- Gordon Begg as Mumford

== Critical reception ==
Film Weekly wrote: "The lighthearted personality of Gene Gerrard, the succession of incidents which provide opportunities for innumerable 'gags,' and the assistance of Jessie Matthews, Kay Hammond, and Kenneth Kove make Out of the Blue an entertainment which will appeal strongly to those who like farce with a touch of music added."

Kine Weekly wrote: "This comedy with music has quite a good story as musical comedies go ... bright gags, clever dialogue and excellent team work, but it is a trifle long for the subject matter. It takes some time to get into its stride, but once it gets going it moves with a ready swing and works up to a capital climax. Although a little scissoring would definitely enhance its entertainment values, this picture is nevertheless bright and enjoyable, and should: make a good light booking."

TV Guide described the film as a "lightweight musical."
