= Let's Love and Laugh =

1931 film directed by Richard Eichberg

- Feature on film from Picture Show (21 November 1931)
- Directed by: Richard Eichberg
- Written by: Frederick J. Jackson; Walter C. Mycroft
- Based on: play The Unwelcome Wife by Edward A. Paulton; Fred Thompson
- Produced by: Richard Eichberg
- Starring: Gene Gerrard; Muriel Angelus; Margaret Yarde
- Cinematography: Heinrich Gartner; Bruno Mondi
- Edited by: Sam Simmonds
- Music by: Hans May; John Reynders
- Production company: British International Pictures
- Distributed by: Wardour Films
- Release date: 12 May 1931
- Running time: 85 minutes
- Country: United Kingdom
- Language: English

Let's Love and Laugh (also known as The Bridegroom's Widow; U.S. title: Bridegroom for Two) is a 1931 British-German comedy film directed by Richard Eichberg and starring Gene Gerrard, Muriel Angelus and Dennis Wyndham. A German-language version, Die Bräutigamswitwe, was made at the same time. It was written by Frederick J. Jackson and Walter C. Mycroft based on the play Unwelcome Wife by Edward A. Paulton and Fred Thompson.

The film launched Gerrard as a popular star, and he went on to appear in a series of comedies for British International Pictures.

== Plot ==
Two philanderers marry each other.

== Cast ==
- Gene Gerrard as George Brown, the bridegroom
- Muriel Angelus as Fay, the bride who was
- Margaret Yarde as Fay's mother
- Frank Stanmore as Columbus, Fay's father
- Dennis Wyndham as Bill, Fay's fiancé
- Henry Wenman as Thomas, the butler
- Rita Page as Maud Huntingdon, the bride who wasn't
- Ronald Frankau as Mr Huntingdon, Maud's father
- George K. Gee as Hicks, the detective

== Critical reception ==
The Film Daily wrote that despite "some funny moments" it was "pretentious" and "draggy" and concluded, "It is all very British and complex, and will hardly click with American audiences."

Film Weekly wrote: "You will laugh at this melange of nonsense, and that's the main thing, fortunately. Beyond its in doubted power to make you chuckle, it has little also to recommend it. The acting, while efficient, is extremely stagey; and the story rambles in the manner the musical comedy from which it is adapted."

Kine Weekly wrote: "This farce with music is very well staged, has tuneful airs, and amusing dialogue which bristles with topical gags, but is a little loose in construction. There are many bright moments, but the development suffers from occasional dull patches. Entertaining as the picture is, it could be sharpened up to advantage."
