= The Love Habit =

1931 film

- Directed by: Harry Lachman
- Written by: Val Valentine; Seymour Hicks
- Based on: Pour avoir Adrienne by Louis Verneuil
- Produced by: John Maxwell
- Starring: Seymour Hicks; Margot Grahame; Edmund Breon
- Cinematography: Jack E. Cox
- Edited by: Edward B. Jarvis
- Production company: British International Pictures
- Distributed by: Wardour Films
- Release date: 16 January 1931
- Running time: 90 minutes
- Country: United Kingdom
- Language: English

The Love Habit is a 1931 British comedy film directed by Harry Lachman and starring Seymour Hicks, Margot Grahame and Edmund Breon. It was made at Elstree Studios with production beginning in August 1930. Produced by British International Pictures, the largest British film company of the time, it was released in January the following year. It was based on a French play Pour avoir Adrienne by Louis Verneuil.

== Cast ==
- Seymour Hicks as Justin Abelard
- Margot Grahame as Julie Bubois
- Edmund Breon as Alphonse Dubois
- Ursula Jeans as Rose Pom Pom
- Clifford Heatherley as Santorelli
- Walter Armitage as Max Quattro
- Elsa Lanchester as Mathilde

== Bibliography ==
- Low, Rachael. Filmmaking in 1930s Britain. George Allen & Unwin, 1985.
- Wood, Linda. British Films, 1927-1939. British Film Institute, 1986.
