= Lucky Girl (1932 film) =

1932 film

- Directed by: Gene Gerrard; Frank Miller
- Written by: Frank Miller; Gene Gerrard; Reginald Berkeley (play); Douglas Furber (play); Bert Lee (play); R.P. Weston (play)
- Produced by: John Maxwell
- Starring: Gene Gerrard; Molly Lamont; Gus McNaughton
- Cinematography: Jack E. Cox; Bryan Langley
- Edited by: Leslie Norman
- Music by: Sydney Baynes
- Production company: British International Pictures
- Distributed by: Wardour Films
- Release date: 1 June 1932
- Running time: 75 minutes
- Country: United Kingdom
- Language: English

Lucky Girl is a 1932 British musical comedy film directed by Gene Gerrard and Frank Miller and starring Gerrard, Molly Lamont and Gus McNaughton. It was made at Elstree Studios with sets designed by the art director John Mead. It was based on a play titled Mr. Abdullah.

== Plot summary ==
A young English-raised former army officer inherits the throne of a small European kingdom. Bored by life there and wishing to raise funds for his impoverished country by selling the crown jewels, he travels to London with his American efficiency expert. Invited to a house party, he travels there incognito but having fallen in love with the daughter of his host he becomes the prime suspect for a robbery that has taken place.

== Cast ==
- Gene Gerrard as Stephan Gregorovitch
- Molly Lamont as Lady Moira
- Gus McNaughton as Hudson E. Greener
- Spencer Trevor as Duke Hugo
- Toni Edgar-Bruce as Duchess Amelia
- Hal Gordon as Police Constable
- Frank Stanmore as Mullins
- Ian Fleming as Lord Henry

== Bibliography ==
- Low, Rachael (1985). Filmmaking in 1930s Britain. George Allen & Unwin.
- Wood, Linda (1986). British Films, 1927–1939. British Film Institute.
