= Verdict of the Sea =

1932 film

- Directed by: Frank Miller; Sidney Northcote
- Written by: Frank Miller
- Produced by: Clayton Hutton
- Starring: John Stuart; Moira Lynd; Cyril McLaglen
- Cinematography: Ernest Palmer; Arthur Crabtree
- Edited by: Bert Bates
- Production company: Regina Films
- Distributed by: Pathé Pictures
- Release date: 14 November 1932
- Running time: 65 minutes
- Country: United Kingdom
- Language: English

Verdict of the Sea is a 1932 British adventure film directed by Frank Miller and Sidney Northcote and starring John Stuart, Moira Lynd and Cyril McLaglen. It was written by Miller, based on a novel by Alan Sullivan. and was made as a quota quickie at Elstree Studios and on location by British International Pictures. The film's sets were designed by David Rawnsley.

== Plot ==
Fenn, the domineering second officer of a merchant ship, is attempting to recruit an extra hand in the London docks for a voyage to Singapore but due to his harsh reputation he can find no volunteers. Eventually he manages to persuade a drunken, middle-class man who has apparently fallen down on his luck to sign on to the ship. Aboard ship the well-spoken "Gentleman" Burton attracts the interest of the captain's daughter Paddy who is curious at his mysterious past. This enrages Fenn who is desperate to marry her, despite her dislike of his rough manners, and he tries to bribe Burton to desert at their first port of call to remove a rival for her love. When Burton refuses to do so, Fenn arranges for local criminals to kidnap him, but is compelled by Paddy to rescue him, which he successfully does.

When the ship arrives at an island to take on supplies, the ship becomes embroiled in a plan by a group of British criminals living on the island to steal some diamonds from a local shopkeeper. The captain agrees to carry the diamonds to safety in Singapore, but the criminals board and take over the ship to get their hands on the diamonds, threatening to kill the surviving crew. Fenn and Burton join forces to repulse the boarders and the ship gets safely to Singapore where Burton and Paddy agree to marry, after he reveals that he quit his previous life as a respectable doctor due to a woman. Meanwhile, Fenn leaves to look for command of a ship of his own.

== Cast ==
- John Stuart as Gentleman Burton
- Moira Lynd as Paddy
- Cyril McLaglen as Fenn
- David Miller as Captain
- Hal Walters as Shorty
- Harold Saxon-Snell as Myers
- Bill Shine as Slim
- Fred Rains as Martin

== Reception ==
Kine Weekly wrote: "John Stuart carries off acting honours and, incidentally, supports the picture on his shoulders all through. Moira Lynd has little or nothing to do, but does it creditably in voice as well as action. Cyril McLaglen hardly shines as he might as Fenn. ... Nothing like a smoothly told story is given in this film; actions leaps from one incident to another disconcertingly, and the changes verge here and there on the ludicrous. A story of this kind demands full blooded treatment, which it has not received."

Picture Show wrote: "Melodrama aboard a tramp steamer. Slow in development and somwhat obscure. Competently acted and extremely convincing atmosphere."

Picturegoer wrote: "The story is jerkily unfolded and incidents follow one another in somewhat disconcerting confusion, which now and again makes the action almost ludicrous."
