= Letting in the Sunshine =

1933 film

- Trade advertisement
- Directed by: Lupino Lane
- Written by: Anthony Asquith; Frank Miller; Herbert Sargent; Con West
- Produced by: John Maxwell
- Starring: Albert Burdon; Renee Gadd; Molly Lamont
- Cinematography: Jack E. Cox; Bryan Langley
- Edited by: E.B. Jarvis
- Music by: Idris Lewis
- Production company: British International Pictures
- Distributed by: Wardour Films
- Release date: 10 July 1933
- Running time: 73 minutes
- Country: United Kingdom
- Language: English

Letting in the Sunshine is a 1933 British comedy crime film directed by Lupino Lane and starring Albert Burdon, Renee Gadd and Molly Lamont. It was written by Anthony Asquith, Frank Miller, Herbert Sargent and Con West. The film was made by British International Pictures at Elstree Studios with sets designed by the art director David Rawnsley. The theme song "Letting in the Sunshine" was written by Noel Gay.

== Synopsis ==
A window cleaner and his housemaid girlfriend try to thwart a gang's plan to steal a valuable necklace during a society dance.

== Cast ==
- Albert Burdon as Nobby Green
- Renee Gadd as Jane
- Molly Lamont as Lady Anne
- Henry Mollison as Duvine
- Herbert Langley as foreman
- Eric Le Fre as Bill
- Ethel Warwick as housekeeper
- Syd Crossley as Jenkyns
- Toni Edgar-Bruce as Lady Warminster

== Reception ==
Kine Weekly wrote: "The story is of the lightest texture, but it leads to a brisk succession of knockabout situations and clever pantomimics which register through the resourceful fooling of Albert Burdon, who plays a hectic part. The easy entertainment is put over with ingenious elaboration, and the film has ail the essentials uf a safe comedy bet for the masses."

The Daily Film Renter wrote: "Wild knockabout slapstick, with Albert Burdon getting the laughs on painter's 'cradle' high above street, agile acrobatics on trick roof, and diverting antics at masquerade ball. Tuneful song number. Good robust fare for popular halls."

Variety wrote: "Picture has as many knockabout, breakaway, vampire, pratfalls, terpsichorean and mechanical stunts as can possibly be crowded into this much footage. But with a diminutive, mugging, low comedian prancing, cavorting and dancing with an extremely pretty and shapely ingenue, ably supported by innumerable feeders, there are so many laughs they can't be counted. The West End may not think this one carries enough weight, but for provincial and neighbcrhood booking it has all the earmarks of success."
