= Harold Saxon-Snell =

British actor (1889–1956)

- Born: 7 August 1889; South Norwood, United Kingdom
- Died: 8 August 1956 (aged 67); Westminster, United Kingdom
- Other name: Leslie Harold Saxon Snell
- Occupation: Actor
- Years active: 1914–1935 (film)

Harold Saxon-Snell (1889–1956) was a British stage and film actor. He appeared in twenty-three films during the silent and early sound eras. He is often credited as H. Saxon-Snell or Harold Snell. He and actress Kathleen Boutall married in 1922.

== Filmography ==
- Eugene Aram (1914)
- The Man Who Bought London (1916)
- The Luck of the Navy (1927)
- Smashing Through (1928)
- The Bondman (1929)
- A Peep Behind the Scenes (1929)
- The Clue of the New Pin (1929)
- The Loves of Robert Burns (1930)
- Deadlock (1931)
- Josser Joins the Navy (1932)
- My Friend the King (1932)
- Verdict of the Sea (1932)
- The Return of Raffles (1932)
- Maid Happy (1933)
- The Love Wager (1933)
- Murder at the Inn (1934)
- The Return of Bulldog Drummond (1934)
- His Majesty and Company (1935)
- Radio Pirates (1935)
- Rolling Home (1935)
- Once in a New Moon (1935)
- Abdul the Damned (1935)
- Royal Cavalcade (1935)

== Bibliography ==
- Goble, Alan (1999). The Complete Index to Literary Sources in Film. de Gruyter. ISBN 978-3598114922.
