= Thomas Bentley (director) =

British film director (1884–1966)

- Born: 23 February 1884; St George Hanover Square, London, England
- Died: 23 December 1966 (aged 82); Bournemouth, Dorset, England
- Occupation: Film director
- Years active: 1912–1951

Thomas Bentley (23 February 1884 – 23 December 1966) was a British film director. He directed 68 films between 1912 and 1941. He directed three films in the early DeForest Phonofilm sound-on-film process, The Man in the Street (1926), The Antidote (1927), and Acci-Dental Treatment (1928).

Bentley was born in St George Hanover Square, London and originally trained as an engineer but went on to become a vaudeville performer well known for impersonating the characters from the novels of Charles Dickens on stage, touring Britain and Australia. His directing career in silent films began in 1910 after he was signed by Cecil Hepworth to write and direct five adaptations of Dickens' novels. He would go on to direct more Dickens adaptations throughout his career. After his retirement from directing in 1941 he became technical advisor to the British Film Council.

In her typescript-cum-memoir, Mabel Poulton named Bentley as the film director-rapist of a young British starlet who then becomes an alcoholic as a result. Poulton starred in two films directed by him: The Old Curiosity Shop (1921) and Not Quite a Lady (1928).

== Legacy ==
Bentley directed nearly 60 films and many shorts during his career. Despite Bentley's long tenure in the British film industry, his work remains comparatively neglected within academic film circles. His modern reputation is also viewed unfavorably, with film historian Rachael Low describing Bentley as a "hum-drum director".

== Selected filmography ==
- Oliver Twist (1912)
- David Copperfield (1913)
- Milestones (1916)
- Les cloches de Corneville (1917)
- The Divine Gift (1918)
- The Old Curiosity Shop (1921)
- The Adventures of Mr. Pickwick (1921)
- A Master of Craft (1922)
- Money Isn't Everything (1925)
- A Romance of Mayfair (1925)
- White Heat (1926)
- The Silver Lining (1927)
- Not Quite a Lady (1928)
- Young Woodley (1928)
- The American Prisoner (1929)
- Harmony Heaven (1930)
- Young Woodley (1930)
- Compromising Daphne (1930)
- Hobson's Choice (1931)
- Keepers of Youth (1931)
- After Office Hours (1932)
- Sleepless Nights (1932)
- The Love Nest (1933)
- Hawley's of High Street (1933)
- The Scotland Yard Mystery (1934)
- Those Were the Days (1934)
- The Great Defender (1934)
- The Old Curiosity Shop (1934)
- Royal Cavalcade (1935)
- Music Hath Charms (1935)
- She Knew What She Wanted (1936)
- The Angelus (1937)
- Silver Blaze (1937)
- The Last Chance (1937)
- Night Alone (1938)
- Marigold (1938)
- Me and My Pal (1939)
- Lucky to Me (1939)
- Dead Man's Shoes (1940)
- The Middle Watch (1940)
- Three Silent Men (1940)
- Old Mother Riley's Circus (1941)
