= Bobbie Comber =

British actor and singer (1886–1942)

- Born: Edmund Comber; 8 January 1886; Bury St Edmunds, Suffolk, England
- Died: 1 March 1942 (aged 56); Bangor, Wales
- Other name: Bobby Comber
- Occupations: Comedian, singer, actor
- Years active: 1904–1941

Edmund Comber (8 January 1886 – 1 March 1942), known professionally as Bobbie Comber, was a British comedian, singer and actor.

He was born in Bury St Edmunds, Suffolk. He first appeared on stage in 1904 in Bournemouth, and worked as a civil servant in the War Office before forming his own concert party in 1912. He served in the military in the First World War, and then toured the country in musical revues and the comedy Chu Chin Chow. He first appeared on stage in London at the Adelphi Theatre in a production of The Naughty Princess in 1920.

Comber's first broadcasts were in excerpts from the show Clowns in Clover, and he made more regular appearances as a comedian on BBC radio from 1929, sometimes as one of "Those Four Chaps": Bobbie Comber, Paul England, Claude Hulbert, and Eddie Childs (Childs was later replaced by Arthur Clay, and subsequently by H. B. Longhurst). Comber also performed in a double act with Hulbert.

== Legacy ==
Comber's comedy songs survive on recordings, such as "Barnacle Bill the Sailor", "Does Santa Claus Sleep with His Whiskers Over or Under the Sheet?", and (with Ray Noble's band) "Turkish Delight". He also appeared in British films, including Elstree Calling (1930), Lazybones (1935), and Be Careful, Mr. Smith (1935).

The BBC's entertainment programmes were broadcast from north Wales during the Second World War, and Comber died there, in Bangor, in 1942, aged 56.

== Selected filmography ==
- Brother Alfred (1932)
- The Fortunate Fool (1933) as Marlowe
- There Goes Susie (1934)
- Lilies of the Field (1934)
- Be Careful, Mr. Smith (1935)
- The Ace of Spades (1935)
- Sporting Love (1936)
- Mother, Don't Rush Me (1936)
- A Romance in Flanders (1937)
- The Singing Cop (1938)
