= Where's Sally? =

1936 film by Arthur B. Woods

- Gene Gerrard and Renee Gadd in a scene from the film
- Directed by: Arthur B. Woods
- Written by: Frank Launder; Brock Williams
- Produced by: Irving Asher
- Starring: Chili Bouchier; Gene Gerrard; Claude Hulbert
- Cinematography: Basil Emmott
- Distributed by: Warner Brothers-First National Productions
- Release date: May 1936
- Running time: 71 minutes
- Country: United Kingdom
- Language: English

Where's Sally? is a lost 1936 British quota quickie comedy film, directed by Arthur B. Woods and starring Chili Bouchier, Gene Gerrard and Claude Hulbert. It was written by Frank Launder and Brock Williams.

== Preservation status ==
The British Film Institute has classed Where's Sally? as a lost film. Its National Archive holds no film or video materials.

== Plot ==
A womanising playboy becomes tired of his philandering lifestyle and asks his current girlfriend to marry him. At the wedding reception, his best man makes a speech treating the entire gathering to the finer details of the bridegroom's chequered romantic history. The bride becomes upset, and her new husband is furious with his best friend for being so indiscreet. He whisks her straight out of the wedding hall and they set off on honeymoon.

Matters are set for a series of farcical complications and misunderstandings as they start to meet a motley selection of odd characters who do nothing to improve relations between the newly-weds. Then the best friend's wife turns up at the honeymoon location, announcing that she has left her husband in disgust. He is quickly on the scene trying to change her mind, and soon there are two sets of bickering couples going full steam, while the bridegroom and his best friend also clash with each other. The bewildered bride has to try to make up her mind whether or not to stay with her new husband.

== Cast ==
- Chili Bouchier as Sonia
- Gene Gerrard as Jimmy Findlay
- Claude Hulbert as Tony Chivers
- Reginald Purdell as Dick Burgess
- Renee Gadd as Sally
- Violet Farebrother as Mrs. Hickory
- Athole Stewart as Lord Mullion
- Morland Graham as Polkinholme

== Reception ==
The Monthly Film Bulletin wrote: "There is nothing original in conception or development in this completely farcical story. It runs on familiar lines from start to finish. There is a great deal of drinking and the humorous situations are frequently those in which the principal characters are intoxicated. Some of the dialogue is amusing, and it is made the most of by an efficient cast who work well together. Gene Gerrard as Jimmy is energetic and amusing. Claude Hulbert, politely imbecile, makes a good foil. Renée Gadd and Chili Bouchier have not a great deal to do, but are adequate to what is asked of them. The director keeps the pace swift, and incident follows incident in rapid succession."

Kine Weekly wrote: "Rollocking farcical comedy, played at a merry pace by an attractive team of Enghsh radio, stage and screen favourites. The crazy fooling, upon which the entertainment is based, is more robust than subtle, but coupled with the excellent team work is amusing dialogue and resourceful direction, and the snappy combination of all three allows the swift succession of conventional comedy situations to culminate in a crescendo of hearty laughs. A feast of fun accompanied by star values, the picture is an excellent hight booking."

The Daily Film Renter wrote: "Gaily irresponsible comedy of erstwhile gay dog's hectic honeymoon misadventures when incensed bride learns facts of lurid past. Presented at fast pace, with lashings of clever alcoholic humour, quota of hilarious misunderstandings, snappy dialogue, and climax in riotous 'knockabout' tradition, this has Gene Gerrard and Claude Hulbert at their best in characteristic roles. Excellent popular entertainment."

Picturegoer wrote: "Stage screen, and radio favourites help to put over the somewhat obvious humour of this rapid action farce quite satisfactorily. The plot, dealing with trouble between newly-weds, is quite bright and runs on conventional farcical lines. Gene Gerrard, as Jimmy, one of three friends whose ranks are depleted by matrimony, is in good form, while Reginald Purdell and Claude Hulbert are good as the other members of the trio. Renee Gadd lacks vitality as Sally, but sound support is afforded by Violet Farebrother, Ralph Roberts, Chili Bouchier, and Athole Stewart. The opening is rather slow, but the pace quickens as the plot develops."

Picture Show wrote: "This is all about a gay Lothario who tries to leave his past behind him when he marries, but finds it intruding on his honeymoon, and his search for his vanishing bride – who spends her time vanishing and returning – gives the film its name. Gene Gerrard, Claude Hulbert and Reginald Purdell are an amusing comedy team, the two latter being the bridegroom's pals from bachelor days, who with the best intentions in the world make a complete mess of things for him."
