= Faithful (1936 film) =

1936 film

- Trade advertisement from The Daily Film Renter (2 March 1936)
- Directed by: Paul L. Stein
- Written by: Brock Williams
- Produced by: Irving Asher
- Starring: Jean Muir; Hans Söhnker
- Cinematography: Basil Emmott
- Edited by: Leslie Norman
- Music by: Pierre Neuville
- Distributed by: Warner Brothers-First National Productions
- Release date: March 1936
- Running time: 78 minutes
- Country: United Kingdom
- Language: English

Faithful is a 1936 British musical drama film, directed by Paul L. Stein and starring Jean Muir and Hans Söhnker. It was made by Warner Brothers at Teddington Studios as a quota quickie production, with an original screenplay by Brock Williams and music by Pierre Neuville.

== Preservation status ==
The British Film Institute has classed Faithful as a lost film. Its National Archive holds a collection of stills but no film or video materials.

== Plot ==
Marilyn and Carl, two pupils from a provincial music conservatory elope, marry, and come to London to try their luck. The husband becomes a singer in a nightclub, and is soon targeted by a predatory socialite. They start an affair, but the wife finds out about it and decides to leave her husband, until matters are smoothed over by a third-party who wishes the couple well.

== Cast ==
- Jean Muir as Marilyn Koster
- Hans Söhnker as Carl Koster
- Chili Bouchier as Pamela Carson
- Gene Gerrard as Danny Reeves
- Margaret Yarde as Mrs. Kemp

== Reception ==
The Monthly Film Bulletin wrote: "The story is extremely obvious and the opening is commonplace, but skill in production and a certain attention to detail and continuity rescue it from absolute mediocrity. The producers indicate their own estimate of its level by not suggesting for a moment that the singer's voice belongs to any higher sphere than that of the night-club. The acting helps: Jean Muir makes the wife an attractive and serious personality; Hans Sonker deals efficiently with the handsome husband according to precedent, and Gene Gerrard makes a really good thing out of the amusing and goldenhearted impresario, but Chili Bouchier as the rich vamp is weak."

The Daily Film Renter wrote: "Elaborately staged in settings ranging from Vienna to London, subject is distinguished by pleasing vocalism of Hans Sonker, who renders tuneful ballads with effect, and appealing work of Jean Muir. Piquant sex interludes, occasionally snappy dialogue, and effective romantic values of triangular variety help to make this pleasant light entertainment for popular patrons."

Kine Weekly wrote: "Simple romantic comedy-drama, with pleasing moments of sentiment, humour and song, attractive sets, and an engaging and versatile cast. The actual story pursues an obvious course, but it is so charmingly decorated with scintillating incidentals that it has no difficulty in covering its ample running time with gay, refreshing entertainment."
