= Too Dangerous to Live =

- Directed by: Anthony Hankey; Leslie Norman
- Screenplay by: Leslie Arliss; Connery Chappell; Paul Gangelin; David Hume (novel)
- Produced by: Jerome Jackson
- Starring: Sebastian Shaw; Anna Konstam; Reginald Tate
- Cinematography: Basil Emmott
- Production company: Warner Brothers-First National
- Distributed by: Warner Brothers-First National
- Release date: 21 August 1939 (UK)
- Running time: 74 minutes
- Country: United Kingdom
- Language: English

Too Dangerous to Live is a 1939 British crime film directed by Anthony Hankey and Leslie Norman and starring Sebastian Shaw, Anna Konstam and Reginald Tate. The screenplay was by Leslie Arliss, Connery Chappell and Paul Gangelin based on the 1933 novel Crime Unlimited by David Hume.

== Preservation status ==
The British Film Institute National Archive holds a collection of stills but no film or video materials.

== Premise ==
A private detective goes undercover by joining a gang of burglars.

== Cast ==
- Sebastian Shaw as Jacques Leclerc
- Anna Konstam as Lou
- Reginald Tate as Collins
- Greta Gynt as Marjorie
- Ronald Adam as Murbridge / Wills
- Edward Lexy as Inspector Cardby
- Ian McLean as Saunders
- Henry Caine as Selford
- George Relph as Manners
- Toni Edgar-Bruce as Mrs. Herbert
- Torin Thatcher as Burton
- William Hartnell as minor role

== Reception ==
Kine Weekly wrote: "The direction is as competent as the acting, no grass is allowed to grow under the story; it works smoothly and excitingly to its spectacular climax. Secret passages mysterious radio stations, aeroplanes, sinister hideouts, death by electrocution, and attempt at a death by arson are but the most easily remembered paraphernalia and phases of the eventful and hair-raising entertainment."

Picture Show wrote: "Thoroughly entertaining crook melodrama ... The film is crisply directed, and is full of interesting touches. The climax is really thrilling and somewhat horrifying. Excellent acting by a well-chosen cast gets the most from the situations and neat dialogue."
