= Gene Gerrard =

British actor (1892–1971)

- Born: 31 August 1892; Clapham, London, England
- Died: 1 June 1971 (aged 78); Sidmouth, Devon, England
- Occupation: Actor

Gene Gerrard (31 August 1892 – 1 June 1971) was an English film and stage actor, and occasional film director. He starred in light musical comedies but returned to his stage career by the 1930s.

He was born Eugene O'Sullivan and began as a cutter in his father's tailoring business in High Holborn, Central London. He became an assistant to Mozart and made his stage début at the revue at the Alhambra Theatre of Variety, London in 1910 and his screen début in 1912 for the Hepworth Company. He served in the Great War.

He is billed as "The 'GENIE' of laughter" on the poster for The Wife's Family (1931).

== Filmography ==
Actor

- Let's Love and Laugh (1931) (His talkie début)
- Out of the Blue (1931), also director
- The Wife's Family (1931)
- Brother Alfred (1932)
- Let Me Explain, Dear (1932)
- Lucky Girl (1932)
- The Love Nest (1933)
- Leave It to Me (1933)
- It's a Bet (1935)
- Royal Cavalcade (1935)
- Joy Ride (1935)
- The Guv'nor (1935)
- There Goes Susie (1935)
- No Monkey Business (1935)
- Faithful (1936)
- Such Is Life (1936)
- Where's Sally? (1936)
- Wake Up Famous (1937)
- Glamour Girl (1938)
- Dumb Dora Discovers Tobacco (1946)

Director

- Out of the Blue (1931)
- Lucky Girl (1932)
- Let Me Explain, Dear (1931)
- Wake Up Famous (1937)
- It's in the Blood (1938)

Screenwriter

- Let Me Explain, Dear (1932)
- Lucky Girl (1932)
- The Love Nest (1933)
- Leave It to Me (1933)
