= Gus McNaughton =

English actor (1881–1969)

- in The 39 Steps (1935)
- Born: 29 July 1881; Hornsey, London, England
- Died: 18 November 1969 (aged 88); Castor, Cambridgeshire, England
- Occupation: Actor
- Years active: 1930–1947
- Spouse: Charlotte Poluski (? - ?)

Gus McNaughton (29 July 1881 – 18 November 1969), also known as Augustus Le Clerq and Augustus Howard, was an English film actor. He appeared in 70 films between 1930 and 1947. He was born in London and died in Castor, Cambridgeshire. He is sometimes credited as Gus MacNaughton. He appeared on stage from 1899, as a juvenile comedian with the Fred Karno company, the influential British music hall troupe. In films, McNaughton was often cast as the "fast-talking sidekick", and he appeared in several popular George Formby comedies of the 1930s and 1940s. He also appeared twice for director Alfred Hitchcock in both Murder! (1930) and The 39 Steps (1935).

== Filmography ==
- Comets (1930) - Himself
- Murder! (1930) - Tom Trewitt (uncredited)
- Children of Chance (1930) - H.K. Zinkwell
- Lucky Girl (1932) - Hudson E. Greener
- The Last Coupon (1932) - Lord Bedlington
- The Maid of the Mountains (1932) - General Malona
- His Wife's Mother (1932) - Joy
- Money Talks (1932) - Solly Sax, Impresario
- Radio Parade (1933) - Himself
- Leave It to Me (1933) - Baxter
- Heads We Go (1933) - Otis Dove
- Crime on the Hill (1933) - Collins
- Happy (1933) - Waller
- The Love Nest (1933) - Fox
- Their Night Out (1933) - Fred Simpson
- Seeing Is Believing (1934) - Geoffrey Cooper
- Master and Man (1934) - Blackmailer
- The Luck of a Sailor (1934) - Official
- There Goes Susie (1934) - Brammel
- Spring in the Air (1934) - Max
- Barnacle Bill (1935) - Jack Baron
- Invitation to the Waltz (1935) - Valet
- Royal Cavalcade (1935) - Workman
- The 39 Steps (1935) - Commercial Traveller #1
- Joy Ride (1935) - String
- The Crouching Beast (1935)
- Music Hath Charms (1935) - Goodwin
- Not So Dusty (1936) - Nobby Clark
- Keep Your Seats, Please (1936) - Max
- Southern Roses (1936) - Parker
- The Heirloom Mystery (1936) - Alfred Fisher
- You Must Get Married (1936) - Bosun
- Action for Slander (1937) - Tandy
- Busman's Holiday (1937) - Alf Green
- Strange Adventures of Mr. Smith (1937) - Will Smith / Black Patch
- Storm in a Teacup (1937) - Horace Skirving
- Keep Fit (1937) - Tom
- South Riding (1938) - Tadman
- Easy Riches (1938) - Joe Hicks
- The Divorce of Lady X (1938) - Waiter
- We're Going to Be Rich (1938) - Broderick
- You're the Doctor (1938) - Kemp
- Sidewalks of London (1938) - Arthur Smith
- The Citadel (1938) - Tom Evans (uncredited)
- Keep Smiling (1938) - Eddie Perkins (uncredited)
- Q Planes (1939) - Blenkinsop
- Trouble Brewing (1939) - Bill Pike
- I Killed the Count (1939) - Martin
- There Ain't No Justice (1939) - Alfie Norton
- What Would You Do, Chums? (1939) - Harry Piper
- Blind Folly (1940) - Professor Zozo
- All at Sea (1940) - Nobby
- That's the Ticket (1940) - Milkbar Monty
- Two for Danger (1940) - Braithwaite
- George and Margaret (1940) - Wolverton
- Old Bill and Son (1941) - Alf
- Facing the Music (1941) - Illusionist
- Jeannie (1941) - Angus Whitelaw
- South American George (1941) - George White
- Penn of Pennsylvania (1942) - Ship's Mate
- The Day Will Dawn (1942) - Army Sergeant
- Let the People Sing (1942) - Ketley
- Much Too Shy (1942) - Manager
- Rose of Tralee (1942) - Gleeson
- The Shipbuilders (1943) - Jim
- Demobbed (1944) - Capt. Gregson
- A Place of One's Own (1945) - P.C. Hargreaves
- The Trojan Brothers (1946) - Frank
- Here Comes the Sun (1946) - Barrett
- The Turners of Prospect Road (1947) - Knocker
- This Was a Woman (1948) - Vet Surgeon
- Feature Story (1949)

== Theatre ==
- Darling, I Love You (1931)
