= The Love Nest (1933 film) =

- Directed by: Thomas Bentley
- Written by: Gene Gerrard; H. F. Maltby; Frank Miller
- Produced by: Walter C. Mycroft
- Starring: Gene Gerrard; Camilla Horn; Nancy Burne; Gus McNaughton
- Cinematography: Walter J. Harvey
- Production company: British International Pictures
- Distributed by: Wardour Films
- Release date: July 1933
- Running time: 69 minutes
- Country: United Kingdom
- Language: English

The Love Nest is a 1933 British comedy film directed by Thomas Bentley starring Gene Gerrard, Camilla Horn, and Nancy Burne. It was written by Gene Gerrard, H. F. Maltby and Frank Miller.

== Preservation status ==
The British Film Institute National Archive holds a collection of ephemera and stills but no film or video materials.

== Plot summary ==
On the eve of his own marriage, a man offers shelter to a runaway wife with whom he strikes up an unexpected bond.

== Cast ==
- Gene Gerrard as George
- Camilla Horn as Fifi
- Nancy Burne as Angela
- Gus McNaughton as Fox
- Garry Marsh as Hugo
- Amy Veness as Ma
- Charles Paton as Pa
- Marian Dawson as Mrs Drinkwater
- Judy Kelly as girl

== Reception ==
Film Weekly wrote: "The Love Nest is a certain laugh raiser for Gerrard's admirers. He is in excellent form."

Kine Weekly wrote: "Piquant, farcical comedy, neatly fashioned in the familiar but popular Elstree mould. The opening is positively brilliant, but the ingenuity and inspiration displayed are not fully sustained, and the more conventional treatment which follows causes the subsequent situations and the denouement to suffer a little in contrast. However, the diverting plot, catchy music and songs, adequate team work and excellent staging combine to keep the entertainment, bright and cheerful, and the film, in its entirety, offers acceptable light diversion."
