= Poluski Brothers =

The Poluski Brothers were an English comedy duo popular in the music halls of the late 19th and early 20th centuries. They were Will Poluski (born William Nelson Govett; 28 July 1855–31 December 1923) and Sam Poluski (born Samuel Thomas Govett; 19 January 1866–1 June 1922).

== History ==
Will Govett was born in Limehouse, London, and his younger brother Sam was born in nearby Shadwell. Sources give various years for Will's birth between 1854 and 1861 (the year he was baptised); when he married in 1878 he gave his age as 21, but at his death his age was given as 68. Their parents were performers, and by 1875 both Will and Sam were apprenticed to Duffy's Circus as "musical clowns".

In the early 1880s, the two brothers started performing together as the Poluski Brothers, making their first appearances in London in 1884. Their act combined acrobatics and slapstick with cross-talking, in which Sam – though the younger brother – was the tall and smartly-dressed straight man, a figure of authority, and Will was the shorter eccentric clown. One of their sketches, "Late on Parade", involved the use of a row of mechanical dolls. According to comedy historian Roger Wilmut, Will "used to ask Sam questions and then hop around the stage shouting 'He can't do it'; he also had a routine where he wrestled spectacularly with himself... [They also used a device] where the straight man would be trapped into agreeing with the comic, and then correct himself...".

The Poluskis (as they were sometimes billed) became popular and toured widely, visiting the United States, South Africa and Australia. Their style of comedy foreshadowed that of many later comedy double acts. They appeared together in pantomimes, made recordings, and appeared together in several silent comedy films. Sam (credited as Sam T. Poluski) appeared as a solo performer in several more short silent films, made in Britain in the mid-1910s, such as Nobby the New Waiter, made by the Ec-Ko Film Company, which drew on routines used by the brothers in their stage act. In 1914, they appeared in a charity matinée performance before King George V and Queen Mary at the London Palladium. They continued to perform together until Sam Poluski's death in 1922, aged 56. Will Poluski died in 1923 (not 1924 as sometimes reported).

Will Poluski was married to Harriet Waite, a fellow music hall performer. One of their sons, also named William, was a member of Fred Karno's company and married Rosetta Wood, the sister of Marie Lloyd; and one of his daughters, Charlotte, married the actor Gus McNaughton. Another daughter, Winnifred, was the mother of Polly Ward (also known as Byno Poluski), who performed in films and on stage with George Formby, Max Miller and others.
