= Facing the Music (1933 film) =

1933 film

- Feature on the film in Picture Show (9 December 1933)
- Directed by: Harry Hughes
- Written by: Clifford Grey; Sidney Gilliat; Frank Launder; Stanley Lupino
- Produced by: John Maxwell
- Starring: Stanley Lupino; Nancy Burne; José Collins; Dennis Hoey
- Cinematography: Walter J. Harvey; Bryan Langley
- Edited by: Leslie Norman
- Music by: Harry Acres
- Production company: British International Pictures
- Distributed by: Wardour Films
- Release date: June 1933
- Running time: 72 minutes
- Country: United Kingdom
- Language: English

Facing the Music (also known as Jewel Song) is a 1933 British musical comedy film directed by Harry Hughes and starring Stanley Lupino, José Collins and Nancy Burne. It was written by Clifford Grey, Sidney Gilliat, Frank Launder and Lupino. It was made as a quota quickie.

== Plot ==
In order to promote his client a publicist organises a fake robbery of her jewels, but things soon begin to unravel.

== Cast ==
- Stanley Lupino as Jack Foley
- Nancy Burne as Nina Carson
- José Collins as Calvini
- Nancy Brown as Rivers
- Doris Woodall as D'Ava
- Lester Matthews as Becker
- Dennis Hoey as Capradossi
- Morris Harvey as De Breen
- Hal Gordon as Sim

== Production ==
The film was made at Elstree Studios by British International Pictures. It was one of a series of films made by the company featuring the popular stage entertainer Stanley Lupino. The film's art direction was by David Rawnsley.

== Reception ==
Kine Weekly wrote: "Farcical comedy with music, a lively, popular medley of romance, song, and slapstick, which scores heartily with new gags and situations, and puts new life and pep into the evergreen ones, through the high speed versatuity and resourcefulness of Stanley Lupino. The staging and team work are excellent, and these important attributes complete the film, which is good, clean fun from start to finish."

The Daily Film Renter wrote: "Stanley Lupino takes honours in role exactly suited to his brand of semi-knockabout humour, with Jose Collins effective as famous prima donna."

TV Guide noted "a stiff opera-oriented production using Faust as a backdrop";
