= R.A.F. (film) =

- title card of the film
- Directed by: John Betts
- Written by: John Betts
- Narrated by: William Helmore
- Cinematography: Horace Wheddon
- Production company: Gaumont-British
- Release date: 17 June 1935
- Running time: 50 minutes
- Country: United Kingdom
- Language: English

R.A.F. is a 1935 British documentary film covering the work of the Royal Air Force (RAF) made by the Gaumont-British Picture Corporation. Various scenes cover the basic training of enlisted men and officers, flying training and parachute training, the flying duties of the RAF including bomber aircraft, torpedo bombers, flying boats and interceptor fighters, and the work of the RAF overseas.

The film was sponsored by the Air Ministry and premiered at the Polytechnic Theatre, Regent Street, London on 17 June 1935 in the presence of Sir Philip Cunliffe-Lister, the Secretary of State for Air.

The work of director John Betts, who also wrote the commentary, the film took 18 months to shoot at various locations throughout the United Kingdom and abroad. Betts' commentary was read by Squadron Leader William Helmore. While the film was praised for its aerial photography, both contemporary and modern sources describe the film as "undiluted propaganda" or "a crudely made recruiting film".

The film music was provided by the Central Band of the Royal Air Force and included as accompaniment to one of the aerial sequences, Wagner's Ride of the Valkyries, over 40 years before its use in a similar sequence in the film Apocalypse Now.
