= Be Careful, Mr. Smith =

1935 British film by Max Mack

- Directed by: Max Mack
- Written by: Frank Atkinson; Ernest Longstaffe
- Produced by: Max Mack
- Starring: Bobbie Comber; Bertha Belmore; Cecil Ramage
- Edited by: James Corbett
- Production company: Union Films
- Distributed by: Apex Film Distributors
- Release date: 7 May 1935
- Running time: 72 minutes
- Country: United Kingdom
- Language: English

Be Careful, Mr. Smith (also known as Singing Through) is a 1935 British comedy film directed by Max Mack and starring Bobbie Comber, Bertha Belmore and Cecil Ramage. It was written by Frank Atkinson and Ernest Longstaffe.

== Plot ==
When Geoffrey Smith retires from his provincial desk-job, he gets involved in a London share-dealing fraud, and brings the criminals to justice.

== Cast ==
- Bobbie Comber as Geoffrey Smith
- Bertha Belmore as Jenny Smith
- Cecil Ramage
- C. Denier Warren
- Arthur Finn
- Warren Jenkins
- Frank Atkinson
- Marie Daine
- Bertha Ricardo
- Ernest Sefton

== Production ==
The film's sets were designed by the art director John Mead.

== Reception ==
Kine Weekly wrote: "Thin, old-fashioned farcical comedy with music, which seldom rises above the amateurish stage. ... The film is, in fact, so incredibly artless that its entertainment, such as it is, can appeal to none but the unsophisticated. ... Bobbie Comber puts over the song numbers successfully in the old music-hall style, but as a character comedian he is far from funny. Bertha Belmore plays opposite him as Jenny, but she, too, is unhappily cast. Weak as the stars are, however, they have nothing on Warren Jenkins as Jimmy and Bertha Ricardo as his fiancée, who are hopelessly ineffectual. ... Although the old-time songs, played against modern night-club backgrounds, have no particular bearing on the story, they provide the happiest feature of the entertainment. They are real entertainment, but this is more than can be said of the comedy situations. The gags are threadbare, the development is obvious, and the dialogue is childish. The film is certainly no feast of snappy, up-to-date fun, but the artlessness of its humour may bring a little enjoyment to the uncritical."

The Daily Film Renter wrote: "Old-fashioned musical comedy treatment, featuring songs of long ago. Treatment is uninspired. Some musical angles, but generally an offering for the uncritical. A rather light and flimsy musical comedy story, with acting that consists almost entirely in delivery of the dialogue as written. ... Bobbie Comber makes an impression when doing the old-time music hall stuff, Bertha Belmore, certainly, is satisfactory as his wife, but there is nobody else of particular note in the cast. The whole thing moves from sequence to sequence, leaving more to the imagination than it reveals. Production values are better than the subject deserves."

In British Sound Films: The Studio Years 1928–1959 David Quinlan rated the film as "mediocre", writing: "Ragged comedy."
