= Bachelor's Baby =

1932 film by Harry Hughes

- Directed by: Harry Hughes
- Written by: Rolph Bennett (novel); Harry Hughes
- Starring: Ann Casson; William Freshman; Henry Wenman
- Cinematography: James Wilson
- Production company: British International Pictures
- Distributed by: Pathé Pictures
- Release date: 22 August 1932
- Running time: 58 minutes
- Country: United Kingdom
- Language: English

Bachelor's Baby is a 1932 British comedy film directed by Harry Hughes and starring Ann Casson, William Freshman and Henry Wenman. It was made by British International Pictures at Elstree Studios.

== Cast ==
- Ann Casson as Peggy
- William Freshman as Jimmy
- Henry Wenman as Capt. Rogers
- Alma Taylor as Aunt Mary
- Ethel Warwick as Mrs. Prowse
- Charles Paton as Mr. Ponder
- Connie Emerald as Mrs. Ponder
- Patrick Ludlow as Clarence
- Helen Goss
- Pearl Hay

== Bibliography ==
- Low, Rachael. Filmmaking in 1930s Britain. George Allen & Unwin, 1985.
- Wood, Linda. British Films, 1927-1939. British Film Institute, 1986.
