= Night Alone =

1938 film directed by Thomas Bentley

- DVD cover
- Directed by: Thomas Bentley
- Written by: Jeffrey Dell (play); Victor Kendall; Vernon Clancey
- Produced by: Warwick Ward
- Starring: Emlyn Williams; Leonora Corbett; Lesley Brook; Cyril Raymond
- Cinematography: Bryan Langley
- Edited by: Ted Richards
- Music by: John Reynders
- Production company: Welwyn Studios
- Distributed by: Pathé Pictures
- Release date: 13 July 1938
- Running time: 76 minutes
- Country: United Kingdom
- Language: English

Night Alone is a 1938 British comedy film directed by Thomas Bentley and starring Emlyn Williams, Leonora Corbett and Lesley Brook. It was written by Jeffrey Dell, Victor Kendall and Vernon Clancey based on the 1937 play of the same title by Dell. The film was shot at the Welwyn Studios of Associated British.

== Plot ==
Charles and Barbara Seaton are a devoted couple who haven't spent a single night apart in their seven years of marriage. However, during a trip to the city for a party, an unexpected business meeting forces Charles to send Barbara ahead without him. Gowing increasingly bored alone in a hotel, Charles visits a nightclub. The evening then spirals out of control; he gets thoroughly drunk and ends up being carried back to the apartment of a young woman who secretly works for a notorious criminal. The police raid the flat and lock Charles in a police station cell. The next morning, Charles makes a frantic dash back to the hotel, desperate to beat Barbara there. He manages to arrive just in time, but as he is in the middle of explaining his absence, a policeman arraives at the door to return the overcoat he left behind. Forced to think on his feet, Charles conjures up a lie that successfully allays Barbara's suspicions and he escapes the embarrassing situation.

== Cast ==
- Emlyn Williams as Charles Seaton
- Leonora Corbett as Vi
- Lesley Brook as Barbara Seaton
- Cyril Raymond as Tommy
- Julie Suedo as Gloria
- Margot Landa as Celia
- Wally Patch as policeman
- John Turnbull as Superintendent

== Reception ==
The Monthly Film Bulletin wrote: "The theme of this may be superficially amusing, but fundamentally it is unpleasant. The 'tongue in the cheek' method of treatment underlines its inherent bad taste. Admittedly it is skilfully put over and well acted. Emlyn Williams enters into the part of Charles with characteristic thoroughness and apparent enjoyment. The result is a caricature of a devoted husband such as would be difficult to find outside the pages of a certain type of fiction. Leonora Corbett gives a clever study of an odious and 'catty' woman who assumes that every man is seeking an opportunity to be unfaithful and urges every woman to retaliate. Lesley Brook makes the best of the ungrateful part of Barbara."

Picture Show wrote: "This entertaining adaptation of the well-known play is a warning to wives not to forget to change their husbands' library books. Although there is rather more dialogue than action and the production is occasionally reminiscent of the stage, it is quite amusing, with Emlyn Williams scoring as the provincial solicitor."
