= Brother Alfred =

1932 film

- Directed by: Henry Edwards
- Written by: Henry Edwards; Claude Guerney
- Based on: the play Brother Alfred (1913) by P. G. Wodehouse and Herbert Westbrook
- Starring: Gene Gerrard; Molly Lamont; Elsie Randolph; Bobbie Comber
- Cinematography: Walter J. Harvey; Horace Wheddon
- Edited by: Bert Bates
- Music by: Vivian Ellis; Idris Lewis
- Production company: British International Pictures
- Distributed by: Wardour Films (UK)
- Release date: 12 April 1932; (London) (UK)
- Running time: 77 minutes
- Country: United Kingdom
- Language: English

Brother Alfred is a 1932 British comedy film directed by Henry Edwards and starring Gene Gerrard, Molly Lamont and Elsie Randolph. It was written by Edwards and Claude Guerney based on the 1913 play of the same title by P.G. Wodehouse and Herbert Westbrook. It was shot at the Elstree Studios of British International Pictures. The film's sets were designed by the art director David Rawnsley.

== Synopsis ==
After she finds him embracing one of the maids, a man's fiancée ends her engagement to him. In an effort to win her back he disguises himself as a fictional twin brother.

== Cast ==
- Gene Gerrard as George Lattaker
- Molly Lamont as Stella
- Elsie Randolph as Mamie
- Bobbie Comber as Billy Marshall
- Clifford Heatherley as Prince Sachsberg
- Hal Gordon as Harold Voles
- Henry Wenman as Uncle George
- Adele Blanche as Pilbeam
- James Carew as Mr. Marshall
- Hugh E. Wright as Sydney
- Harvey Braban as Denis
- Maurice Colbourne as equerry
- Toni Edgar-Bruce as Mrs. Vandaline

== Critical reception ==
Film Weekly wrote: "P. G.. Wodehouse is written all over Brother Alfred. Only he could create such comical complications, and then untangle them so ingeniously and farcically. ... The action is mostly confined to a yacht, but the brisk direction of Henry Edwards never allows the story to be static. Gene Gerrard flings himself joyfully into the role of George, and there will be many who will acclaim this as lhis funniest performance. ... Here is a farce, sometimes bordering on the boisterous, that is distinctly bright, with plenty of hearty laughs."

Kine Weekly wrote: "Gene Gerrard's stage technique, personality and resourcefulness hold together the slight story and gloss over the occasional flat spots ... The film in its entirety represents agreeable and attractive light entertainment."
