= She Knew What She Wanted =

- Trade advertisement (The Daily Film Renter, 9 May 1936)
- Directed by: Thomas Bentley
- Written by: Fred Thompson (play); Paul Gerard Smith (play); Frank Miller; Thomas J. Geraghty
- Produced by: Thomas Bentley
- Starring: Albert Burdon; Betty Ann Davies; Claude Dampier; Googie Withers
- Cinematography: Curt Courant
- Production company: John Argyle Productions
- Distributed by: Wardour Films
- Release date: June 1936
- Running time: 74 minutes
- Country: United Kingdom
- Language: English

She Knew What She Wanted (also known as Kiss and Make Up) is a 1936 British musical comedy film directed by Thomas Bentley and starring Albert Burdon, Claude Dampier and Googie Withers. It was written by Frank Miller and Thomas J. Geraghty based on the 1927 stage musical Funny Face by Fred Thompson and Paul Gerard Smith, and was made as a quota quickie.

== Preservation status ==
The British Film Institute National Archive holds a collection of ephemera and stills but no film or video materials.

== Plot ==
Ex-convent girl Frankie Dean, a compulsive liar, inviegles her way into a relationship with famous bandleader Peter Thurston. In the home of her guardian, Jimmy Reeve, she unnerves him with a diary filled with libellous claims about his character. After Jimmy locks the diary away, Frankie spins a colourful story to Peter, who foolishly agrees to help her break in to retrieve it. Their attempt entangles them with a pair of crooks, Chester and Herbert and, though everything ultimately works out – proving that for Frankie, lying pays off after all.

== Cast ==
- Albert Burdon as Dugsie
- Betty Ann Davies as Frankie Dean
- Claude Dampier as Jimmy Reeves
- W.H. Berry as Herbert
- Fred Conyngham as Peter Thurston
- Ben Welden as Chester
- Googie Withers as Dora
- Hope Davy as June
- Sybil Grove as Mme. Piccard
- Albert le Fre as butler

== Reception ==
The Monthly Film Bulletin wrote: "Musical comedy with a heroine as completely amoral as it is possible to conceive. ... The plot of a musical comedy is not required to be consistent or probable, but some novelty is expected. Situations, dialogue, and dances are equally lacking in originality. There is a great deal of drinking, and much of the humour is dependent on the intoxication of the characters. The juvenile leads work hard but are obviously inexperienced. Claude Dampier overacts in the part of the guardian – but is amusing in his way; and Albert Burdon is genuinely funny. The settings are lavish, and the photography and lighting good."

Kine Weekly wrote: "Here we have a musical comedy, catering with artless aplomb for those of simple, untutored tastes. The plot is not altogether devoid of originality, and the cast combines in equal proportions experience and youthful enthusiasm, but the pep and polish of the first-rate musical is somewhat lacking in the treatment. However, even if the picture is too orthodox and too imitative to be certain of appealing confidently to the full circle of fastidious film fans, it nevertheless has in its variety, attractive credit titles, simple humour and tuneful numbers the equipment to entertain the industrial majority."

Picture Show wrote: "Conventional musical comedy in which an irresponsible young girl has a habit of telling fibs about everything which leads her first into romance and then into trouble. The film has been given lavish settings and catchy music to offset its somewhat antiquated gags and situations, and the cast work hard."
