= There Goes Susie =

The There Goes Susie
- Directed by: Victor Hanbury; John Stafford
- Written by: Hans Jacoby (story); Charlie Roellinghoff (story)
- Produced by: Victor Hanbury; John Stafford
- Starring: Gene Gerrard; Wendy Barrie; Zelma O'Neal
- Music by: Otto Stransky; Jack Beaver
- Production company: British International Pictures
- Distributed by: Pathé Pictures
- Release date: 6 September 1934
- Running time: 70 minutes
- Country: United Kingdom
- Language: English
- Budget: $175,000

There Goes Susie (U.S. title for 1935 release: Scandals of Paris) is a 1934 British comedy film directed by Victor Hanbury and John Stafford and starring Gene Gerrard, Wendy Barrie, and Zelma O'Neal. Written by Charlie Roellinghoff and Hans Jacoby, it was made by British International Pictures at Elstree Studios. It is a remake of the 1933 German film Marion, That's Not Nice. An Italian version, Model Wanted (1933), was also made.

== Plot ==
An artist is hired by a major soap company for an advertisement. He paints a model in a revealing pose, only to discover she is the boss's daughter.

== Cast ==
- Gene Gerrard as Andre Cochet
- Wendy Barrie as Madeleine Sarteaux
- Zelma O'Neal as Bunny
- Gus McNaughton as Brammel
- Henry Wenman as Otto Sarteaux
- Gibb McLaughlin as advertising manager
- Bobbie Comber as Uncle Oscar
- Mark Daly as Sunshine

== Reception ==
Picturegoer wrote: "Parisian backgrounds are not too convincing, but the musical numbers are tuneful and good performances come from a capable cast."

Picture Show wrote: "Gene Gerrard as Andre is in excellent form, and is responsible for some first-rate humour. Wendy Barrie as Madeline is also at her best, and gives an extremely good performance in support. The remainder of the cast maintain the high standard of those mentioned, which adds greatly to the ultimate success of the picture."

In British Sound Films: The Studio Years 1928–1959 David Quinlan rated the film as "average", writing: "The story counts for little in this musical-comedy."
