= Love Lies (1932 film) =

1932 film

- Binnie Barnes and Stanley Lupino in the film
- Directed by: Lupino Lane
- Written by: Stanley Lupino (musical); Arthur Rigby (musical); Frank Miller
- Produced by: Stanley Lupino
- Starring: Stanley Lupino; Dorothy Boyd; Jack Hobbs; Binnie Barnes
- Cinematography: Walter J. Harvey; Horace Wheddon
- Edited by: Edward B. Jarvis
- Music by: Idris Lewis
- Production company: British International Pictures
- Distributed by: Wardour Films
- Release date: 11 August 1932
- Running time: 70 minutes
- Country: United Kingdom
- Language: English

Love Lies is a 1932 British musical comedy film directed by Lupino Lane and starring Stanley Lupino, Dorothy Boyd and Jack Hobbs. It was written by Frank Miller based on the 1928 stage musical So This is Love! by Arthur Rigby and Lupino. It was made by British International Pictures at Elstree Studios.

== Plot ==
At a bullfight in Spain, Jerry Walker meets Junetta, who falls for him. Jerry flees the country, arriving home just too late for his friend Rolly Rider's wedding. Rolly's uncle arrives. Because the uncle fiercely objects to his nephew's marriage, Rolly pretends that his new bride, Joyce, is actually Jerry's wife. Then Jerry's own uncle shows up, accompanied by Junetta, whom he insists Jerry must marry. Following a series of comic misunderstandings the couples are sorted out, and Jerry marries Junetta.

== Cast ==
- Stanley Lupino as Jerry Walker
- Dorothy Boyd as Joyce
- Jack Hobbs as Rolly Rider
- Dennis Hoey as Cyrus Watt
- Binnie Barnes as Junetta
- Sebastian Smith as Nicholas Wich
- Wallace Lupino as Lord Lletgoe
- Arty Ash as Butler
- Charles Courtneidge as Inspector
- Denis O'Neil as prison warder

== Reception ==
Film Weekly wrote: "Stanley Lupino's first full length 'talkie,' made under the direction of his cousin, Lupino Lane, is one long laugh from start to finish. The humour is as pointed as a bayonet and as delicate as a gun-butt, but nevertheless, the, laughs are there... Whether you are a high, low or middle-brow, you will laugh – despite its faults – at this new British film, which moves with a speed unusual in pictures made this side of the Atlantic."

Kine Weekly wrote: "Depending entirely for its effect on the quips and tooling of the principals, this film, which is rather more in the nature of a musical comedy without songs than a farce, provides a very good hour's amusement. Stanley Lupino and Jack Hobbs put up some excellent scenes, and are well supported."

Picturegoer wrote: "A picture that relies not on its story, which is of the rapid musical-comedy variety, but on the wisecracks and knockabout efforts of the principal comedians. It is safe for an hour's entertainment if you do not go to it in too critical a mood or to simply to enjoy a good laugh – preferably after a good dinner."
