= Henry Wenman =

British actor (1875–1953)

Henry Wenman (1875-1953) was a British actor.

He was a brother of theatrical producer Charles Wenman, who had a substantial career in Australia.

== Filmography ==
Year	Title	Role	Notes
1929	The Silver King	Cripps	
1930	The Middle Watch	Marine Ogg	
1931	Let's Love and Laugh	The Butler	
1931	The Shadow Between	Sergeant Blake	
1931	Potiphar's Wife	Stevens	
1932	Money for Nothing	Jay Cheddar	
1932	Two White Arms	Mears	
1932	Brother Alfred	Uncle George	
1932	Bachelor's Baby	Capt. Rogers	
1934	Freedom of the Seas	Wallace	
1934	There Goes Susie	Otto Sarteaux	
1935	Brewster's Millions	Pedro	(final film role)
