= Compromising Daphne =

1930 British film by Thomas Bentley

- Feature on the film from Picture Show (1 August 1931)
- Directed by: Thomas Bentley
- Written by: Edith Fitzgerald (play); Val Valentine
- Produced by: John Maxwell
- Starring: Jean Colin; Phyllis Konstam; C. M. Hallard; Viola Compton
- Cinematography: Claude Friese-Greene
- Edited by: Leslie Norman
- Production company: British International Pictures
- Distributed by: Wardour Films
- Release date: 22 October 1930
- Running time: 86 minutes
- Country: United Kingdom
- Language: English

Compromising Daphne (also known as Compromised!) is a 1930 British comedy film directed by Thomas Bentley and starring Jean Colin, Phyllis Konstam, C. M. Hallard and Viola Compton. It was written by Val Valentine based on the play by Edith Fitzgerald and produced by British International Pictures at their Elstree Studios with sets designed by John Mead.

== Preservation status ==
The British Film Institute National Archive holds a collection of ephemera and stills but no film or video materials.

== Plot ==
Daphne Ponsonby and George wish to be married, but Daphne's parents object. In desperation she arranges for a young man to visit her in her bedroom to compromise her. However he goes to the wrong bedroom, and is subsequently arrested. The father of the accidentally compromised girl then gets involved, and a farcical turn of events follows.

== Cast ==
- Jean Colin as Daphne Ponsonby
- Charles Hickman as George
- Phyllis Konstam as Sadie Bannister
- C. M. Hallard as Mr Ponsonby
- Viola Compton as Mrs Ponsonby
- Leo Sheffield as Mr Bannister
- Frank Perfitt as Hicks
- Barbara Gott as Martha
- Margot Grahame as Muriel

== Reception ==
Film Weekly wrote: "There are many bright laughs in this British farce, which is on the whole a satisfactorily made picture."

Kine Weekly wrote: "A light, frivolous, farcical comedy which is refreshingly English, and allows evergreen situations to be put over in a manner which gives them an irresistible piquancy. The picture moves at a brisk pace, and the team work is excellent. ... Jean Colin has freshness and charm as Daphne, and enters into the spirit of the play with great gusto. Charles Hickman is an effervescent George and works tremendously hard, while C. M. Hallard retains a sense of dignity as Ponsonby."

The Daily Film Renter wrote: "Obvious kind of old-fashioned farce comedy. Acting is sufficient for the story, which becomes increasingly irresponsible as it goes on. Quite the popular sort of humour more particularly in the fashion few years back. ... This is the type of production of which little need be said, except to absolve the director from any responsibility for the story. Thomas Bentley has made probably the best job that could be made of it; but it is all very familiar stuff."
