= Toni Edgar-Bruce =

British actress (1892–1966)

- 1939 Spotlight photo
- Born: Sybil Etonia Bruce; 4 June 1892; London, England
- Died: 28 March 1966 (aged 73); Chertsey, Surrey, England
- Occupation: Actress
- Years active: 1914–1952

Toni Edgar-Bruce (4 June 1892 – 28 March 1966) was a British actress, frequently seen on stage. Her theatre work included the original West End production of Somerset Maugham's The Circle in 1921.

The actor-manager Edgar Bruce was her father.

== Filmography ==
- Duke's Son (1920)
- Charles Augustus Milverton (1922)
- A Warm Corner (1930)
- Tell England (1931)
- Brother Alfred (1932)
- Mr. Bill the Conqueror (1932)
- Diamond Cut Diamond (1932)
- Lucky Girl (1932)
- The Melody-Maker (1933)
- Falling for You (1933)
- Mannequin (1933)
- As Good As New (1933)
- Heads We Go (1933)
- Letting in the Sunshine (1933)
- Leave It to Me (1933)
- Princess Charming (1934)
- The Broken Melody (1934)
- Nell Gwyn (1934)
- Lilies of the Field (1934)
- Whispering Tongues (1934)
- Handle with Care (1935)
- Mr. What's-His-Name? (1935)
- Night Mail (1935)
- Captain Bill (1936)
- The Last Waltz (1936)
- Boys Will Be Girls (1937)
- Behind Your Back (1937)
- Scruffy (1938)
- Too Dangerous to Live (1939)
- Gert and Daisy Clean Up (1942)
- The First of the Few (1942)
- Somewhere on Leave (1943)
- It Happened One Sunday (1944)
- Heaven Is Round the Corner (1944)
- Twilight Hour (1945)
- Waltz Time (1945)
- Derby Day (1952)
