= Sleepless Nights (1932 film) =

1932 film directed by Thomas Bentley

- French poster
- Directed by: Thomas Bentley
- Written by: Stanley Lupino; Victor Kendall
- Produced by: Walter C. Mycroft
- Starring: Stanley Lupino; Polly Walker; Gerald Rawlinson; Frederick Lloyd
- Cinematography: Jack E. Cox
- Edited by: Walter Stokvis
- Music by: Noel Gay; Harry Acres
- Production company: British International Pictures
- Distributed by: Wardour Films
- Release date: 7 November 1932
- Running time: 73 minutes
- Country: United Kingdom
- Language: English

Sleepless Nights (also known as Farandole De Nuits and Darling) is a 1932 British musical comedy film directed by Thomas Bentley and starring Stanley Lupino, Polly Walker and Gerald Rawlinson. It was written by Lupino and Victor Kendall, and made at Elstree Studios by British International Pictures. Unlike most of Lupino's other films it was based on an original screenplay rather than an existing stage work.

== Cast ==
- Stanley Lupino as Guy Raynor
- Polly Walker as Marjorie Drew
- Gerald Rawlinson as Gerald Ventnor
- Frederick Lloyd as Summers
- Percy Parsons as Mr. Drew
- Charlotte Parry as Mrs. Drew
- David Miller as Captain
- Hal Gordon as gendarme

== Reception ==
Film Weekly wrote: "Here's Stanley Lupino'e brightest farce, a really funny film of its type. Its amusing situations, its tuneful music, and its swift action pointed dialogue raise it to the top of the class."

Kine Weekly wrote: "Merry bedroom farce with music, simple, saucy, scintillating entertainment, a tonic for these depressing days. Thomas Bentley, the producer, has co-ordinated action with music with lively effect, and his spirited direction, coupled with the resourcefulness of Stanley Lupino and the charm of Polly Walker, brings to the screen a light picture which should delight all classes."
