= Bert Bates =

British film editor

- Born: 18 August 1907; Walthamstow, London, England
- Died: 23 April 1976 (aged 68); Barnet, London, England
- Other name: A.S. Bates
- Occupation: Film editor
- Years active: 1931–1973

Bert Bates (18 August 1907 – 23 April 1976) was a British film editor, sometimes credited as A. S. Bates. He worked on more than sixty films during his career. Bates edited his first feature film, Many Waters, in 1931. He went on to be employed by many leading British studios, working on films by directors including Alfred Hitchcock, Anatole Litvak and Carol Reed.

== Selected filmography ==
- Many Waters (1931)
- Brother Alfred (1932)
- Fires of Fate (1932)
- Verdict of the Sea (1932)
- Leave It to Me (1933)
- Heads We Go (1933)
- You Made Me Love You (1933)
- Happy (1933)
- Girls Will Be Boys (1934)
- Man of the Moment (1935)
- It's in the Bag (1936)
- Gypsy (1937)
- The Return of Carol Deane (1938)
- The Midas Touch (1940)
- White Cradle Inn (1947)
- Idol of Paris (1948)
- Under Capricorn (1949)
- The Cure for Love (1949)
- Outcast of the Islands (1951)
- Happy Go Lovely (1951)
- Home at Seven (1952)
- The Ringer (1952)
- The Holly and the Ivy (1952)
- The Man Between (1953)
- Malaga (1954)
- The Man Who Loved Redheads (1955)
- A Kid for Two Farthings (1955)
- The Deep Blue Sea (1955)
- Anastasia (1956)
- Legend of the Lost (1957)
- The Key (1958)
- Our Man in Havana (1959)
- The World of Suzie Wong (1960)
- The Best of Enemies (1961)
- Goodbye Again (1961)
- Five Miles to Midnight (1962)
- The Running Man (1963)
- A Shot in the Dark (1964)
- 633 Squadron (1964)
- The Battle of the Villa Fiorita (1965)
- The Heroes of Telemark (1965)
- Return of the Seven (1966)
- Cast a Giant Shadow (1966)
- The Long Duel (1967)
- Interlude (1968)
- Battle of Britain (1969)
- The Light at the Edge of the World (1971)
- Diamonds Are Forever (1971)
- Live and Let Die (1973)
