= Over the Garden Wall (1934 film) =

- Opening titles
- Directed by: John Daumery
- Written by: H. F. Maltby (play); Gordon Wellesley
- Produced by: Walter C. Mycroft
- Starring: Bobby Howes; Marian Marsh; Margaret Bannerman; Viola Lyel
- Cinematography: Jack E. Cox
- Edited by: Leslie Norman
- Music by: Harry Acres
- Production company: British International Pictures
- Distributed by: British International Pictures
- Release date: June 1934
- Running time: 68 minutes
- Country: United Kingdom
- Language: English

Over the Garden Wall is a 1934 British musical romantic comedy film directed by John Daumery and starring Bobby Howes, Marian Marsh and Margaret Bannerman. It was written by H. F. Maltby and Gordon Wellesley from the play The Youngest of Three by Maltby.

== Synopsis ==
A young man and a woman exchange glances through the windows of their passing trains. They later discover that they are staying in neighboring houses, but their respective families are feuding, and they are only occasionally able to continue their romance across the garden wall. Eventually, they decide to elope together, but this only leads to more trouble than it is worth.

== Cast ==
- Bobby Howes as Bunny
- Marian Marsh as Mary
- Margaret Bannerman as Diana
- Viola Lyel as Gladys
- Bertha Belmore as Jennifer
- Syd Crossley as Podds
- Mary Sheridan as Tilda
- Freddie Watts as Thorold

Stewart Granger and Henry B. Longhurst appear in minor roles.

== Production ==
The film was made at Elstree Studios with sets designed by art director David Rawnsley. Marian Marsh was imported from Hollywood where she had starred in major productions such as Svengali (1931).

== Reception ==
The Daily Film Renter wrote: "Farce comedy (with occasional songs) presenting Bobby Howes as young man enamoured of 'girl next door.' ... Played with gusto by competent cast, picture moves along smoothly to tune of laughs, culminating in rather naive finale. Marian Marsh makes attractive co-star for Howes, whose admirers should find this effort much to their tastes. Reliable popular fare."

Picturegoer wrote: "Simple romance interspersed with song numbers which is chiefly entertaining because of the versatility and personality of Bobby Howes. Marian Marsh is quite good, but not outstanding as object of his affections and Margaret Bannerman and Bertha Belmore are fair as the pair's respective aunts who contribute the reason why the romance does not run smoothly. It is hearty simple material adequately put over."
