= You Must Get Married =

1936 British comedy film

- Trade advertisement for the film
- Directed by: Leslie Pearce
- Written by: Richard Fisher; F. McGrew Willis
- Based on: You Must Get Married by David Evans
- Produced by: Basil Humphreys
- Starring: Frances Day; Neil Hamilton; Robertson Hare
- Cinematography: Claude Friese-Greene
- Production company: Walton Studios
- Distributed by: City Film Corporation
- Release date: December 1936
- Running time: 68 minutes
- Country: United Kingdom
- Language: English

You Must Get Married is a 1936 British comedy film directed by Leslie Pearce and starring Frances Day, Neil Hamilton and Robertson Hare. It was written by Richard Fisher and F. McGrew Willis based on a novel of the same title by David Evans.

== Plot ==
American film star Fenella Dane signs a major contract, only to discover her British work permit has expired. To escape deportation, her publicist Percy Phut arranges a marriage of convenience with Captain Brown. Unhappy with the expectation that he vanish after the wedding, Brown abducts Fenella and Percy onto his tramp steamer. Upon reaching Oran, Fenella escapes to claim another lucrative film offer, but her new husband tracks her down and carries her off again.

== Cast ==
- Frances Day as Fenella Dane
- Neil Hamilton as Michael Brown
- Robertson Hare as Percy Phut
- Wally Patch as Chief Blow
- Gus McNaughton as Bosun
- Fred Duprez as Cyrus P. Hankin
- Dennis Wyndham as Albert Gull
- C. Denier Warren as Mr Wurtsell
- James Carew as Mr Schillinger

== Reception ==
The Monthly Film Bulletin wrote: "Vivacious comedy on board ship. ... Frances Day shows an excellent sense of comedy, so long as she is allowed to be free from fantastic dresses and arch make-up. She is an ascending British star. Robertson Hare is already a national figure of fun, and Neil Hamilton is a very presentable hero. The humour errs too far on the theme of undressing."

Kine Weekly wrote: "Farcical comedy, so threadbare in story values, that not even the enlistment of a good cast and the cultivation of authentic atmosphere can draw from it more than an occasional laugh. Frances Day does her share with consummate self-confidence, and Robertson Hare scintillates shyly, but they are merely stars in an otherwise barren sky."
