= Horace Wheddon =

British cinematographer

- Born: Horace Marrison Wheddon; 1891; Kentish Town, London, England
- Died: 1959 (aged 67–68); Worthing, Sussex, England
- Other name: "Dilly"
- Occupation: Cinematographer
- Years active: 1926 - 1937

Horace Wheddon (1891–1959) was a British cinematographer. He worked at one point for British Instructional Films, which was then merged into the major studio British International Pictures.

== Selected filmography ==
- The Conspirators (1924)
- Mons (1926)
- The Further Adventures of the Flag Lieutenant (1927)
- The Fake (1927)
- The Passing of Mr. Quinn (1928)
- The Clue of the New Pin (1929)
- The Squeaker (1930)
- Dreyfus (1931)
- P.C. Josser (1931)
- Love Lies (1931)
- Brother Alfred (1932)
- Holiday Lovers (1932)
- Music Hath Charms (1935)
- Royal Cavalcade (1935)
- R.A.F. (1935)
- McGlusky the Sea Rover (1935)
- I Live Again (1936)
- Cotton Queen (1937)

== Bibliography ==
- Low, Rachael. History of the British Film: Filmmaking in 1930s Britain. George Allen & Unwin, 1985 .
