= High Seas (film) =

1929 film

- German poster
- Directed by: Denison Clift
- Written by: Monckton Hoffe (story); Victor Kendall; Denison Clift
- Produced by: Denison Clift
- Starring: Lillian Rich; John Stuart; Randle Ayrton; Winter Hall
- Cinematography: Claude L. McDonnell
- Music by: John Reynders
- Production company: British International Pictures
- Distributed by: First National-Pathé Pictures; Süd-Film (Germany)
- Release date: May 1929
- Running time: 72 minutes
- Country: United Kingdom
- Languages: Sound (Synchronized); English

High Seas is a sound 1929 British adventure film directed by Denison Clift and starring Lillian Rich, James Carew, John Stuart, Randle Ayrton and Winter Hall. While the film has no audible dialog, it features a synchronized musical score, singing and sound effects on the soundtrack.

The film follows a wealthy young man who falls in love with a sailor's daughter who saves him from a shipwreck. When he announces he wants to marry her, his family try to foil the match. It was based on a story by Monckton Hoffe.

== Cast ==
- Lillian Rich as Faith Jeffrey
- John Stuart as Tiny Bracklethorpe
- Randle Ayrton as Captain Jeffrey
- Winter Hall as Lord Bracklethorpe
- Janet Alexander as Lady Bracklethorpe
- James Carew as Jaeger
- Daisy Campbell as Mrs Jeffrey

== Bibliography ==
- Wood, Linda. British Films, 1927-1939. British Film Institute, 1986.
