= Royal Cavalcade =

1935 British film

- George Robey, Arthur Prince and Harry Tate
- Directed by: Thomas Bentley; Herbert Brenon; W. P. Kellino; Norman Lee; Walter Summers; Marcel Varnel
- Written by: Marjorie Deans; Eric Maschwitz; Val Gielgud
- Produced by: Walter C. Mycroft; David Horne; Roy Goddard
- Starring: Marie Lohr; Hermione Baddeley; Owen Nares
- Cinematography: James Corbett
- Edited by: Jack E. Cox; Phil Grindrod; Bryan Langley; Leslie Rowson; Horace Wheddon
- Music by: Idris Lewis
- Production company: British International Pictures
- Distributed by: Wardour Films; Film Alliance of the United States
- Release date: 4 April 1935 (London)
- Running time: 104 minutes
- Country: United Kingdom
- Language: English

Royal Cavalcade (also known as Regal Cavalcade and Jubilee Cavalcade) is a 1935 British black-and-white drama film with six directors: Thomas Bentley (Supervising Director), Herbert Brenon, Norman Lee, Walter Summers, W. P. Kellino and Marcel Varnel. The film stars many entertainers, including Marie Lohr, Hermione Baddeley, Owen Nares, Robert Hale, Austin Trevor, James Carew, Edward Chapman and Ronald Shiner. It was written by Marjorie Deans, Eric Maschwitz and Val Gielgud, and presented by Associated British Pictures Corporation. It was made to mark the twenty fifth anniversary of the succession of George V to the throne.

== Synopsis ==
The film is a dramatised pastiche of great events that occurred during the reign of George V. A newly minted 1911 penny coin passes from hand to hand, and each person has a story to tell about the events of our time.

== Cast ==
- Marie Lohr as mother
- Hermione Baddeley as barmaid
- Robert Hale as drinker
- J.H. Roberts as drinker
- Charles Paton as taxi driver
- C. V. France as father
- John Singer as boy
- Esmé Percy as Lloyd George
- Frederick Lloyd as neighbour
- C. Denier Warren as Smith
- Pearl Argyle as Anna Pavlova
- Frank Vosper as Capt. Robert Falcon Scott
- Austin Trevor as Capt. Oates
- John Stuart as explorer in tent
- Jane Baxter as girl in punt
- John Mills as young enlistee
- Jimmy Hanley as newsboy
- Wallace Bosco as M.P.
- Alice Lloyd as Marie Lloyd
- Amy Veness as suffragette
- Antoinette Cellier as Marjorie Wilkinson
- Jimmy Godden as Harry
- Chili Bouchier as landgirl
- Renée Macready as landgirl
- Annie Esmond as lady
- Bertha Belmore as schoolmistress
- C. M. Hallard as Winston Churchill
- H. Saxon-Snell as Sir Edward Grey
- Fred Groves as soldier
- George Graves as Old Bill
- Ronald Shiner as soldier in trenches
- Iris Ashley as girl
- Constance Shotter as grl
- Patric Knowles as army officer
- Judy Kelly as girl
- Billy Caryll as theatrical agent
- Hilda Mundy as girl
- Gus McNaughton as workman
- W. H. Berry as Bob
- Henry Mollison as John Doughty
- Gene Gerrard as bus passenger
- Vera Pearce as bus passenger's wife
- Reginald Gardiner as bus conductor
- Reginald Purdell as radio listener
- Ellen Pollock as wife
- Diana Napier as actress talking to doorman
- Syd Walker as stage doorman
- Rene Ray as girl
- Elaine Benson as child in bed
- Leonora Corbett as nurse
- Olga Lindo as tourist
- Mary Glynne as waitress
- Sam Livesey as drinker
- Robert Nainby as drinker
- Seymour Hicks as gentleman
- Ellaline Terriss as wife
- Owen Nares as gentleman
- Aileen Marson as lady
- Gyles Isham as Dining Officer
- Arthur Margetson as Dining Officer
- Basil Gill as Bishop
- Jerry Verno as taxpayer
- Craighall Sherry as Chancellor
- Ivan Samson as man
- Carol Goodner as tourist in Tower of London
- James Carew as tourist in Tower of London
- Ben Welden as businessman
- Matheson Lang as Henry V
- Athene Seyler as Queen Elizabeth I
- George Robey as self
- Arthur Prince as self
- Harry Tate as self
- Nancy Astor as self
- Jack Judge as self
- Florrie Forde as self
- Bert Feldman as self
- Norman Long as self
- Stanton Jefferies as self
- Stuart Hibberd as self
- Leonard Henry as self

== Reception ==
Kine Weekly wrote: "British International has given the screen a fitting tribute to celebrate the Jubilee of King George V. It is not a question of to whom it is going to appeal, but rather who there can possibly be who does not want to see it. In other words, there has never been a picture which represents such cast-iron box-office appeal ... .It is an almost impossible task to put on paper in a short space the incidents covered by this unique production."

The Daily Film Renter wrote: "Inspiring cavalcade of His Majesty's s wonderful twenty-five years' reign, with 1911 penny forming ingenious continuity device. Producers have re-staged historic incidents with uncanny realism, combining them with occasional news reel shots, result being fascinating mosaic of quarter of a century of progress. Film leaves fiction 'at the post' by virtue of absorbing human interest, mighty drama and regal pageantry, while cast is veritable 'Who's Who' of stage and film worlds."
