= Music Hath Charms =

1935 British film

- Henry Hall in the film
- Directed by: Thomas Bentley; Alexander Esway; Walter Summers; Arthur B. Woods
- Written by: L. du Garde Peach
- Produced by: Walter C. Mycroft
- Starring: Henry Hall; Carol Goodner; Arthur Margetson; Lorna Hubbard
- Cinematography: Jack E. Cox; Claude Friese-Greene; Otto Kanturek; Bryan Langley; Ronald Neame; Horace Wheddon
- Edited by: J. Corbett
- Music by: Benjamin Frankel (arranger)
- Production company: British International Pictures
- Distributed by: Wardour Films
- Release date: 2 March 1936
- Running time: 70 minutes
- Country: United Kingdom
- Language: English

Music Hath Charms is a 1935 British musical comedy film directed by Thomas Bentley (supervising director), Walter Summers, Arthur B. Woods and Alexander Esway, and starring Henry Hall with the BBC Dance Orchestra, Carol Goodner and Arthur Margetson. It was written by L. du Garde Peach, with music and lyrics by Hall, Mabel Wayne, Desmond Carter and Collie Knox.

== Scenario ==
The film complrises a loosely connected series of comedy-drama episodes set to the music of Henry Hall and his band.

== Cast ==
- Henry Hall as himself
- W.H. Berry as Basil Turner
- Carol Goodner as Mrs. Norbray
- Arthur Margetson as Alan Sterling
- Lorna Hubbard as Marjorie Turner
- Antoinette Cellier as Joan
- Billy Milton as Jack Lawton
- Aubrey Mallalieu as Judge
- Wallace Douglas as George Sheridan
- Edith Sharpe as Miss Wilkinson
- Gus McNaughton as Goodwin
- Hugh Dempster as Tony Blower
- Cyril Smith as BBC Producer

== Musical numbers ==
- "Music Hath Charms" – the theme tune is performed twice, first with Dan Donovan on vocals at the beginning of the film, and later at the end with a harmony quartet and mixed chorus.
- "I'm Feeling Happy" – performed when Henry Hall goes to the recording studio. Dan Donovan provides the vocals.
- "There Is No Time Like the Present" – performed at a rehearsal.
- "Honey-Coloured Moon" – performed with vocals by Hildegarde.
- "Many Happy Returns Of The Day" – performed during a montage of Henry Hall's "birthday parade", after which the band-members go missing. This song should not be confused with the Burke-Dubin song of the same name, published in 1931.
- "Just Little Bits and Pieces" – the orchestra is still missing by 5.15, so Henry begins the programme with a piano improvisation, during which his musicians appear one by one.
- "(Serenading A) Big Ship" – featuring Dan Donovan on vocals, the action turns to an African outpost, where a man is too distracted by the music to defend himself from an incoming horde of cannibals.

== Reception ==
The Monthly Film Bulletin wrote: "Amusing fantasy by L. du Garde Peach. Henry Hall proves himself quite a competent actor, as do his boys; his admirers are in no danger of being disappointed. But apart from the news value of the band, the film has real merits of its own as a delightful piece of humour."

Kine Weekly wrote: "Musical medley, an ear-tickling exiravaganza of melody, song, comedy and drama, effectively and shrewdly designed to give full vent to England's Dance Band No. 1, to wit Henry Hall's. The number of strings to the artless plot, fashioned principally to show the happy influence of the B.B.C. dance orchestra on people at home and abroad, leads at times to slight narratal confusion, but the band fortunately is always on parade to keep the andience in step with good humour and conduct them at a merry gait through the plot's many byways. The film is, in fact, a cheerful maze of harmony, with no chinks in its box-office armour."

The Daily Film Renter wrote: "Musical exploiting Henry Hall and B.B.C. band, whose rendition of tuneful numbers form principal entertainment bid. Far-fetched patchwork plot depicts effect of Hall's broadcasts on listeners in jungle, High Court, ocean liner, and Highland mountain locales. ... Offering of popular calibre, with Henry Hall's name to pull 'em in."
