= Elstree Calling =

1930 film by Adrian Brunel and Alfred Hitchcock

- Directed by: Adrian Brunel; Alfred Hitchcock
- Written by: Adrian Brunel; Walter C. Mycroft; Val Valentine
- Starring: Tommy Handley; Helen Burnell; Donald Calthrop
- Cinematography: Claude Friese-Greene
- Production company: British International Pictures
- Distributed by: Wardour Films (UK)
- Release dates: 6 February 1930 (London); 29 September 1930 (UK)
- Running time: 87 minutes
- Country: United Kingdom
- Language: English

Elstree Calling is a 1930 British comedy musical film directed by Adrian Brunel and Alfred Hitchcock at Elstree Studios.

== Synopsis ==
Elstree Calling (1930)

The film, referred to as "A Cine-Radio Revue" in its original publicity, is a lavish musical film revue and was Britain's answer to the Hollywood revues which had been produced by the major studios in the United States, such as Paramount on Parade (1930) and The Hollywood Revue of 1929. The revue has a slim plot about its being a television broadcast. The film consists of 19 comedy and music vignettes linked by running jokes of an aspiring Shakespearean actor and technical problems with a viewer's TV set.

== Production background ==
Among Hitchcock's contributions were the comic linking segments about a man trying to "tune in" the revue on his television set, but always failing to get the picture for long because of his needless tinkering. In the UK, John Logie Baird's work in mechanical television in the 1920s made television a topical subject at the time. The film's ensemble numbers were staged by André Charlot, Paul Murray and Jack Hulbert.

Imitating the lavish use of Technicolor by Hollywood studios at that time, four sequences in the film were coloured by the Pathécolor process, which used stencils to tint selected areas of the black and white prints.

In their book Film's musical moment, Ian Conrich and Estella Tincknell write:

"The British equivalent of Hollywood's all-star revues was Elstree Calling (1930), produced by British International Pictures (BIP), which consisted mainly of musical and comedy items from stage shows of the day introduced by compère Tommy Handley. Lacking the lavish production values and visual spectacle of its Hollywood equivalents, Elstree Calling is now something of a curio item interesting chiefly for two reasons: Alfred Hitchcock (then contracted to BIP) was... employed on the production; and the film is quite possibly the first ever to refer directly to television (the linking narrative concerns a television broadcast of the revue, some six years before the BBC began regular television transmissions)."

== Cast ==
In credits order:

- Will Fyffe
- Cicely Courtneidge
- Jack Hulbert
- Tommy Handley
- Lily Morris
- Helen Burnell
- The Berkoffs
- Bobbie Comber
- Lawrence Green
- Ivor McLaren
- Anna May Wong
- Jameson Thomas
- John Longden
- Donald Calthrop
- Gordon Harker
- Hannah Jones
- Teddy Brown
- Chocolate Kiddies trio, The Three Eddies: Shakey (Clarence) Beasley, Chick (Layburn) Horsey and Tiny (Earle) Ray
- The Balalaika Choral Orchestra

Supported by:

- The Aldelphi Girls
- The Charlot Girls

Also with:

- Gordon Begg as Shakespeare
- Nathan Shacknovsky
- John Stuart

== Copyright status and home media ==
Like Hitchcock's other British films, Elstree Calling has been heavily bootlegged on home video. As of early 2019, the officially licensed, preserved version has only appeared on DVD from Network Distributing in the UK.

== See also ==
- List of early color feature films
