= Victor Kendall =

British screenwriter (1903–?)

Victor Kendall (26 September 1903–date unknown) was a British screenwriter notable for his work in the 1930s.

Kendall wrote the screenplay for Atlantic (1929), the first sound portrayal of the Titanic disaster, and worked for several British studios and production companies but spent most of his screenwriting career with British International Pictures.

== Unverified acting career ==
According to IMDb, this was the same person who proceeded to an acting career in the United States, commencing as one of the uncredited students in A Chump at Oxford (1939). Other films through to 1943 in which an actor of this name appeared are listed in the same source. Against this background, it might be noted that there are no England and Wales birth records for any Victor Kendall in 1903, no sign of emigration to the United States in the 1930s, and no evidence of a person with such a name and approximate date of birth in the 1940 US Census.

== Selected filmography as screenwriter ==
- Weekend Wives (1928)
- Atlantic (1929)
- Atlantik (1929)
- High Seas (1929)
- The Copper (1930)
- Young Woodley (1930)
- Night Birds (1930)
- Atlantis (1930)
- Cape Forlorn (1931)
- Potiphar's Wife (1931)
- The Maid of the Mountains (1932)
- Sleepless Nights (1932)
- Love and Luck (1932)
- Dick Turpin (1933)
- Heads We Go (1933)
- Meet Mr. Penny (1938)
- Night Alone (1938)
- Save a Little Sunshine (1938)
- Dead Men Are Dangerous (1939)

== Bibliography ==
- Richards, Jeffrey. A Night to Remember: the Definitive Titanic Film: A British Film Guide. I.B.Tauris, 2002.
