= Jack E. Cox =

English cinematographer

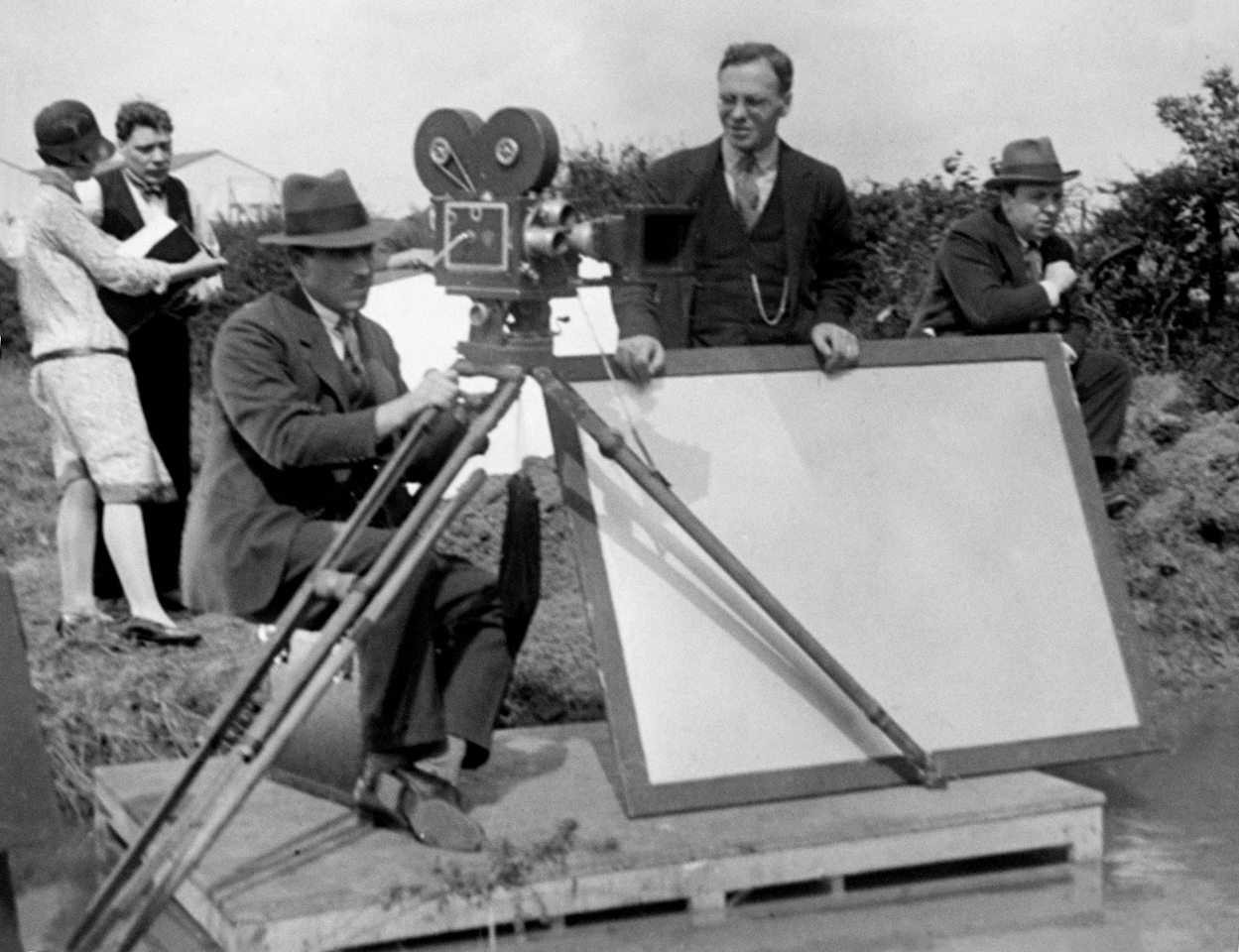
- Born: 26 July 1896; London, England
- Died: 29 July 1960 (aged 64); Surrey, England
- Occupation: Cinematographer

Jack E. Cox, BSC, known variously as J. J. Cox, Jack Cox, John J. Cox and John Cox, was an English cinematographer born in London, on 26 July 1896. After a prolific career of 85 films in 33 years, Cox died in Surrey on 29 July 1960.

== Selected filmography ==
- The Four Feathers (1921)
- The Yellow Claw (1921)
- Petticoat Loose (1922)
- The Gold Cure (1925)
- Confessions (1925)
- The Chinese Bungalow (1926)
- Hindle Wakes (1927)
- Blighty (1927)
- The Ring (1927)
- The Farmer's Wife (1928)
- Champagne (1928)
- Weekend Wives (1928)
- The Manxman (1929)
- The Lady from the Sea (1929)
- Blackmail (1929)
- Murder! (1930)
- The Middle Watch (1930)
- Almost a Honeymoon (1930)
- Juno and the Paycock (1930)
- Cape Forlorn (1931)
- The Skin Game (1931)
- The Love Habit (1931)
- Mary (1931)
- Glamour (1931)
- Lucky Girl (1932)
- Sleepless Nights (1932)
- Hawley's of High Street (1933)
- Heads We Go (1933)
- Red Wagon (1933)
- Letting in the Sunshine (1933)
- The Great Defender (1934)
- Love at Second Sight (1934)
- Over the Garden Wall (1934)
- Music Hath Charms (1935)
- The Man Who Changed His Mind (1936)
- Windbag the Sailor (1936)
- O-Kay for Sound (1937)
- Doctor Syn (1937)
- Crackerjack (1938)
- The Lady Vanishes (1938)
- Strange Boarders (1938)
- They Came by Night (1940)
- Cottage to Let (1941)
- Hi Gang! (1941)
- The Ghost Train (1941)
- The Wicked Lady (1945)
- They Were Sisters (1945)
- The Idol of Paris (1948)
- Traveller's Joy (1950)
- Mister Drake's Duck (1951)
- Babes in Bagdad (1952)
- Devil Girl from Mars (1954)
- Star of My Night (1954)
- One Good Turn (1955)
- Alias John Preston (1955)
- Man of the Moment (1955)
- Up in the World (1956)
- Jumping for Joy (1956)
- Just My Luck (1957)
- The Big Money (1958)
- The Square Peg (1959)
