= Idris Lewis =

Welsh musician (1889-1952)

- Born: 21 November 1889; Birchgrove, Llansamlet, Glamorgan, Wales
- Died: 15 April 1952 (aged 62); Cardiff, Wales
- Occupations: Composer, musical director

Idris Lewis (21 November 1889 – 15 April 1952) was a Welsh conductor and composer. He worked on the film scores of a number of productions during the 1930s, when he was employed by British International Pictures. He was the Director of Music for the Welsh Region of the BBC.

== Biography ==
Idris Lewis was born in Birchgrove near Swansea on 21 November 1889, the son of a coal miner. He was interested in music as a child, and when he was sixteen he won a scholarship to study at the Royal College of Music in London.

In 1911 and 1912, after completing his studies at the Royal College, Lewis toured India and the Far East, giving piano recitals.

He became assistant director at Daly's Theatre in London, and musical director at the Lyric and Gaiety Theatres. He was also organist at the Charing Cross Road Welsh Presbyterian Chapel and conductor of the London Welsh Choral Society and of the London Welsh Male Voice Choir.

In 1927 he joined the film company British International Pictures, where he was the musical director from 1931 to 1937. While there he arranged the music for several films.

His work on the 1934 film Blossom Time starring Richard Tauber brought Lewis to the attention of the BBC, and in 1936 he became the first Music Director of the Welsh Region of the BBC in Cardiff, where his assistants were to include the composers Mansel Thomas and Arwel Hughes. At the BBC Lewis was responsible for several radio series of popular vocal music, including Melys Lais and Cenwch im yr hen ganiadau.

In addition to his film compositions, Lewis composed songs and arranged works for male voice choir. His song cycle Alun Mabon is a setting of a pastoral poem in Welsh by John Ceiriog Hughes (1832–1887), and includes Cân Yr Arad Goch which has become well known and has been recorded by singers including Bryn Terfel.

Idris Evans died at his home in Cardiff on 15 April 1952.

== Selected filmography ==
- Why Sailors Leave Home (1930)
- Love Lies (1931)
- Brother Alfred (1932)
- Let Me Explain, Dear (1932)
- Strip! Strip! Hooray!!! (1932)
- Mr. Bill the Conqueror (1932)
- Letting in the Sunshine (1933)
- Radio Parade (1933)
- The Blarney Stone (1933)
- Money Talks (1933)
- Blossom Time (1934)
- Heart's Desire (1935)
- It's a Bet (1935)

== Bibliography ==
- Taves, Brian. P.G. Wodehouse and Hollywood: Screenwriting, Satires and Adaptations. McFarland, 2006.
