= David Rawnsley =

British art director (1909–1977)

- Born: 1909; Sevenoaks, Kent, England
- Died: 1977 (aged 67–68); Capri, Italy
- Occupation: Art director
- Years active: 1931 - 1949 (film)

David Rawnsley (1909–1977) was a British art director.

For his last four films, Rawnsley oversaw a scheme to streamline production operations for the Rank Organisation. His innovations were widely ridiculed by the Rank film crews. Despite this resistance, David Rawnsley developed independent frame storyboarding and back projection, both radical improvements to the filmmaking process which are still in use today.

David Willingham Rawnsley co-founded the Chelsea pottery with his third wife, born Elaine Doran, a model and talented ceramic artist, and with her he had five children. Rawnsley moved from England to Capri in the 60s, and there he became a well-known sculptor and artist. He died in 1977 while married to his fourth wife Phyllis (May), leaving one son from this last marriage.

== Selected filmography ==
- Out of the Blue (1931)
- Fascination (1931)
- Verdict of the Sea (1932)
- Brother Alfred (1932)
- The Maid of the Mountains (1932)
- For the Love of Mike (1932)
- Facing the Music (1933)
- Letting in the Sunshine (1933)
- Love at Second Sight (1934)
- Over the Garden Wall (1934)
- The Improper Duchess (1936)
- A Star Fell from Heaven (1936)
- A Royal Divorce (1938)
- 49th Parallel (1941)
- One of Our Aircraft Is Missing (1942)
- In Which We Serve (1942)
- They Flew Alone (1942)
- The Way Ahead (1944)
- They Were Sisters (1945)
- The Rake's Progress (1945)
- I See a Dark Stranger (1946)
- Night Boat to Dublin (1946)
- Under the Frozen Falls [1948)
- Warning to Wantons (1949)
- Floodtide (1949)
- Stop Press Girl (1949)
