= Frank Miller (screenwriter) =

British filmmaker (1891–1950)

Frank Miller (1891–1950) was a prolific screenwriter, film director, and actor from London, England, UK.

== Selected filmography ==
- The March Hare (1919)
- Control (1920)
- The Knave of Diamonds (1921)
- The Alley of Golden Hearts (1924)
- Houp-La! (1928)
- Cupid in Clover (1929)
- Love Lies (1931)
- Shadows (1931)
- Out of the Blue (1931)
- Lucky Girl (1932)
- Verdict of the Sea (1932)
- A Southern Maid (1933)
- Letting in the Sunshine (1933)
- Money Talks (1933)
- My Song Goes Round the World (1934)
- The Scotland Yard Mystery (1934)
- It's a Bet (1935)
- The Deputy Drummer (1935)
- Dandy Dick (1935)
- Father O'Flynn (1935)
- Honeymoon for Three (1935)
- She Knew What She Wanted (1936)
- Annie Laurie (1936)
