= John Maxwell (producer) =

British film producer

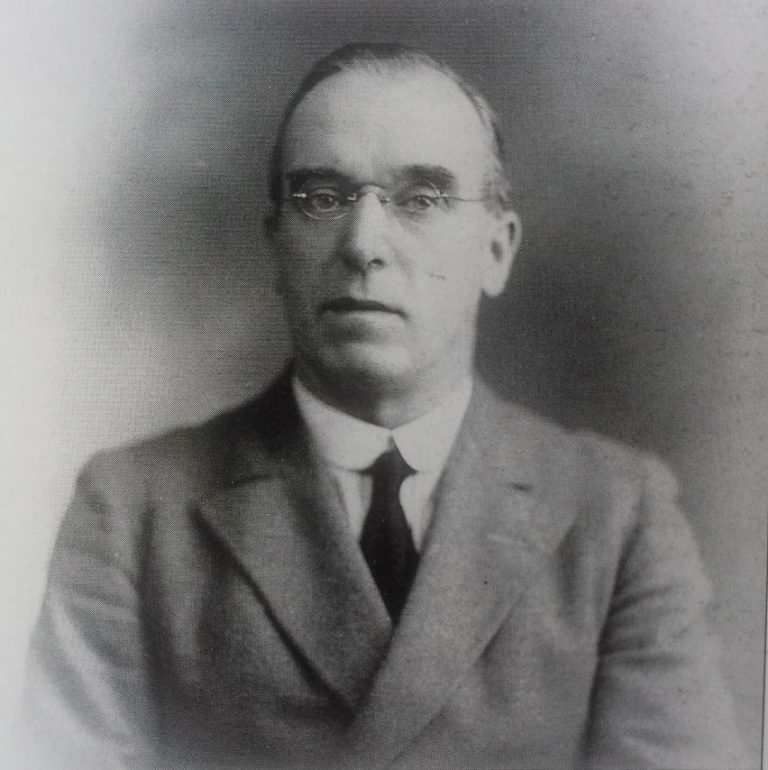
- Born: 1879; Glasgow, Scotland; United Kingdom
- Died: 2 October 1940 (aged 60–61); Surrey, England; United Kingdom
- Occupation: Film Producer

John Maxwell (1879–1940) was a British film producer. Maxwell was the co-owner of British International Pictures, which emerged as the largest British studio following the Film Act of 1927. Maxwell was a Scottish lawyer who first came into contact with the film industry in 1912. In 1927 he took over the newly constructed British National Studios in Elstree after its founders ran into financial problems. Maxwell built a vertically integrated company incorporating film production, film distribution, initially through Wardour Films, and a large network of cinemas (ABC Cinemas) that enabled the company to compete with the leading German and Hollywood firms. Along with the facilities in Elstree, the company also acquired Welwyn Studios in Welwyn Garden City.

With BIP (which was renamed Associated British Picture Corporation in 1933) John Maxwell began a major production programme. Maxwell imported top filmmakers from Europe as well as signing up leading British talent such as Alfred Hitchcock. Under Maxwell's leadership BIP produced several masterpieces of late silent cinema. With Hitchcock's Blackmail (1929) the company successfully made the transition to sound. While it continued to make some more expensive films, it increasingly relied on large numbers of medium or low-budget comedies and musicals aimed at the British rather than the international market.

By the mid-1930s BIP had been overtaken by its rival Gaumont British as the largest British producer. Maxwell bought a stake in Gaumont, intending this as a first step to a takeover that would allow him to merge the two companies to create a giant firm. However, he discovered that he had acquired non-voting shares, which brought him no actual control over the company. He took legal action and a court case followed.

In July 1937, Maxwell became a financial partner in Charles Laughton and Erich Pommer's independent film production company, Mayflower Pictures, by buying a substantial interest in shares in the company. Maxwell's role in the firm, and as a board member, was to guarantee financing and distribution (through Associated British Picture) of the films in the British Isles and North America. The company made three films: Vessel of Wrath (1938), St. Martin's Lane (1938), and Jamaica Inn (1939).

By 1938, Maxwell owned 502 cinemas to support his productions.

His characteristics are talking with his hand over his mouth, never getting to the office until mid-day, spending two hours over lunch (which means that he has learned the secret of success - the delegation of authority), an affection for big rooms, gaspers, and a quarter bottle of champagne at eleven o'clock every morning with a dry biscuit. His hobbies are reading and walking. He is a Scot who does not play golf, likes precision, regards card-playing as the evidence of an idle mind, and a trudge round Paris with a guide-book as the perfect holiday. The Bystander, February 2, 1938

Charles Bennett called him "a nasty sort of unpleasant man."

Maxwell died in 1940. The corporation of which he was chairman and managing director had assets of over £50 million and controlled a circuit of theatres which was the second largest in the world.

== Selected filmography ==
- The Manxman (1929)
- Elstree Calling (1930)
- The Middle Watch (1930)
- Hobson's Choice (1931)
- The Woman Between (1931)
- Out of the Blue (1931)
- Potiphar's Wife (1931)
- Josser in the Army (1932)
- Lucky Girl (1932)
- Facing the Music (1933)
- The Song You Gave Me (1933)
- Heads We Go (1933)
- Letting in the Sunshine (1933)

== Bibliography ==
- Low, Rachael. Filmmaking in 1930s Britain. George Allen & Unwin, 1985.
- Richards, Jeffrey. The Age of the Dream Palace: Cinema and Society in 1930s Britain. I.B. Tauris, 2010.
- Warren, Patricia. Elstree Studios: The British Hollywood. Columbus Books, 1988.
