= Sporting Love (film) =

- Directed by: J. Elder Wills
- Written by: Stanley Lupino (play); Ingram D'Abbes; Fenn Sherie
- Produced by: Henry Passmore
- Starring: Stanley Lupino; Laddie Cliff; Lu Ann Meredith
- Cinematography: Eric Cross
- Edited by: Hugh Stewart
- Music by: Billy Mayerl; Eric Ansell; Jack Beaver
- Production company: Hammer Films
- Distributed by: British Lion Film Corporation
- Release date: 6 December 1936
- Running time: 70 minutes
- Country: United Kingdom
- Language: English

Sporting Love is a 1936 British musical comedy film directed by J. Elder Wills and starring Stanley Lupino, Laddie Cliff and Lu Ann Meredith. It was made at Beaconsfield Studios. It was based on the musical Sporting Love which Stanley Lupino had written and starred in. Lupino had broken with British International Pictures to make a couple of independent films, but after this he returned to BIP.

== Plot ==
The Brace brothers (Percy and Peter) are in a continual trough of financial depression and fear they may lose their racehorse Moonbeam to repay a mortgage to Mr. Dane. The brothers borrow money from their aunt Fanny, claiming they are both getting married and thus need her financial aid. They get caught in a lie however when Aunt Fanny announces she's coming to visit them. The brothers try to talk two women (Nellie and Maud) into posing as their wives to fool Aunt Fanny. Nellie's fiance shows up unexpectedly, breaks up with Nellie and winds up making a play for Aunt Fanny. Mr. Dane tries to withdraw their racehorse from the Derby, and the two brothers are forced to kidnap the animal. Percy winds up betting on the wrong horse as the race begins, but things work out for the best and the Brace brothers end up accidentally winning a massive sum at the track.

== Cast ==
- Stanley Lupino as Percy Brace
- Laddie Cliff as Peter Brace
- Eda Peel as Maude Dane
- Lu Ann Meredith as Nellie Gray
- Bobbie Comber as Gerald Dane
- Henry Carlisle as Lord Dimsdale
- Clarissa Selwynne as Aunt Fanny
- Wyn Weaver as Wilfred Wimple
- Barry Lupino
- Arty Ash
- Syd Crossley
- Merle Tottenham

== Critical reception ==
Filming was completed on June 23, 1936, and the film was released in the UK on Dec. 6, 1936. Variety (12/9/36) reviewed it, saying "Good enough to be accepted in America as a programmer." But the film fared poorly at the box office, and resulted in Hammer Films' not making another movie for more than a decade.

In 1940, Pathescope Monthly called it "A lively comedy you will enjoy!"

== Bibliography ==
- Low, Rachael. Filmmaking in 1930s Britain. George Allen & Unwin, 1985.
- Wood, Linda. British Films, 1927-1939. British Film Institute, 1986.
