= Who's Your Father =

- Lupino Lane in the film.
- Directed by: Lupino Lane
- Written by: Lupino Lane; Arthur Rigby; Reginald Long
- Based on: play by Mark Melford
- Starring: Lupino Lane; Peter Haddon; Nita Harvey
- Music by: W.L. Trytel
- Production company: St. George's Pictures
- Distributed by: Columbia Pictures
- Release date: March 1935
- Running time: 63 minutes
- Country: United Kingdom
- Language: English

Who's Your Father is a 1935 British comedy film directed by Lupino Lane and starring Lane, Peter Haddon and Nita Harvey. It was written by Lane, Arthur Rigby and Reginald Long based on the play Turned Up by Mark Melford.

The film was based on Turned Up, a farce in three acts first originally produced in 1886 as Too Much Married. In 1926 Julian Wylie and James W. Tate produced a stage musical adaptation by Rigby starring Lane and Melford's nephew, Jack Melford.

== Plot ==
George Medway’s plans to introduce his prospective father-in-law to his mother go awry when he discovers she has secretly remarried, putting his inheritance at risk. The situation gets even more complicated when his mother's first husband, long thought to have been lost at sea, suddenly reappears, revealing that during a bout of amnesia, he inadvertently took a second wife.

== Cast ==
- Lupino Lane as George Medway
- Peter Haddon as Frank Steadley
- Nita Harvey as Bina Medway
- Jean Kent as Mary Radcliffe (credited as Joan Kent)
- Margaret Yard as Mrs. Medway
- James Carew as Elmer J. Radcliffe
- Peter Gawthorne as Captain Medway
- James Finlayson as cast member
- Eva Hudson as cast member

== Reception ==
Kine Weekly wrote: "The cast is a good one, and it is tireless team work as much as anything that contributes to the modest success of the show. With its adequate complement of laughs and attractive stars, the picture establishes its right to a place on the average two picture programme. Good light booking for the masses."

The Daily Film Renter wrote: "Robust entertainment of unsophisticated type, relying mainly on tumbling antics of star, and – to a lesser degree – of supporting cast. Invested with additional gags and humorous dialogue, with acting hearty rather than polished. Should make adequate program material for the masses."
