= The Love Race =

1931 film

- Directed by: Lupino Lane
- Written by: Edwin Greenwood
- Based on: The Love Race by Stanley Lupino
- Produced by: Stanley Lupino
- Starring: Stanley Lupino; Jack Hobbs; Dorothy Boyd
- Cinematography: James Wilson
- Edited by: Sam Simmonds
- Music by: John Reynders
- Production company: British International Pictures
- Distributed by: Wardour Films
- Release date: 26 December 1931
- Running time: 81 minutes
- Country: United Kingdom
- Language: English

The Love Race is a 1931 British comedy film directed by Lupino Lane and starring Stanley Lupino, Jack Hobbs and Dorothy Boyd. It was adapted by Edwin Greenwood from Stanley Lupino's play of the same name and was produced by British International Pictures. It was shot at the company's Elstree Studios outside London. The film's sets were designed by the art director Duncan Sutherland. A very young – and blonde – Ida Lupino appears in the chorus.

== Plot ==
A mix-up with suitcases lands a wealthy racing driver into an embarrassing situation with his fiancée at a party.

== Cast ==
- Stanley Lupino as Reggie Powley
- Jack Hobbs as Bobbie Mostyn
- Dorothy Boyd as Ida Mostyn
- Dorothy Bartlam as Rita Payne
- Frank Perfitt as Mr Powley
- Wallace Lupino as Ferdinand Fish
- Arty Ash as Eustace
- Florence Vie as Mrs Mostyn
- Doris Rogers as Nernice Dawn

== Reception ==
Film Weekly wrote: "The Love Race, appropriately enough, moves with welcome speed, and it succeeds, by the variety and number of its 'gags,' in providing happy entertainment for the many who revel in humour of the music-hall-brand. Stanley Lupino and Jacks Hobbs put in some high-pressure, work, while Dorothy Bartlam, making the most of thin part, indicates what she could do if given scope for her ability."

Kine Weekly wrote: "A refreshing farcical comedy with music, an adaptation of the Gaiety Theatre success, in which familiar gags and conventional slapstick situations are put over with that joie de vivre which gives the illusion of newness and spontaneity. The star, ably supported by a strong West End cast, puts in good work, while the quality of the production is excellent."
