= Sporting Love =

Original theatre programme

Sporting Love is a musical written by Stanley Lupino with music by Billy Mayerl, lyrics by Desmond Carter and Frank Eyton.

Produced by Lupino, it opened at the Gaiety Theatre, London on 31 March 1934 and ran for 302 performances, closing on 26 January the following year.

In 1936 it was adapted as a film Sporting Love starring Lupino, featuring some of the original stage cast.

== Plot ==
Brothers Percy and Peter Brace scheme to avoid imminent bankruptcy by gambling on the horses. They would also dearly love to marry to marry sisters Mabel and Maude, if only the girls' hostile father Gerald could be brought round. The brothers hit on a mad cap scheme to inherit money from a rich aunt, but farcical mix-ups ensure things do not go according to plan.

== Stage cast ==
- Peter Brace – Laddie Cliff
- Percy Brace – Stanley Lupino
- Gerald Dane – Arthur Rigby Jr.
- Maud Dane – Marjorie Browne
- Mabel Dane – Vera Bryer
- Nelly Grey – Jenny Dean
- Prologue/Andy Dene – James Croome
- Claude Barrington – Arty Ash
- Stable Lad – Guy Vaughan
- Groom – Ewart Watt
- Trainer/Bert Bray – Peter Miller
- Jack Lester – Basil Howes
- Freddy Croome – Harry Milton
- Norman Drew/Henry Bernard – William Lorimer
- Wilfred Wimple – Wyn Weaver
- Lord Dimsdale – Henry Carlisle
- Maid – Irene North
- June Westley – Gilly Flower
- Fanny Maydew – Eileen Munro
