= The Deputy Drummer =

1935 British film by Lupino Lane

- Opening titles
- Directed by: Lupino Lane
- Written by: Stanley Brightman; Peter Cheyney; Reginald Long; Frank Miller; Arthur Rigby
- Based on: the musical Darling, I Love You by Stanley Brightman & Arthur Rigby
- Produced by: Ian Sutherland
- Starring: Lupino Lane; Jean Denis; Kathleen Kelly; Syd Crossley
- Cinematography: Alex Bryce
- Edited by: Sam Simmonds
- Music by: Harold Brewer; Billy Mayerl (songs and lyrics); Frank Eyton (songs and lyrics)
- Production company: St. George's Pictures
- Distributed by: Columbia Pictures
- Release date: September 1935
- Running time: 71 minutes
- Country: United Kingdom
- Language: English

The Deputy Drummer is a 1935 British musical film directed by Lupino Lane and starring Lane, Jean Denis and Kathleen Kelly. It was written by Stanley Brightman, Peter Cheyney, Reginald Long, Frank Miller and Arthur Rigby based on the 1930 musical Darling I Love You by Stanley Brightman and Rigby.

== Synopsis ==
Drummer and aspiring composer Adolphus Miggs is fired by his exasperated bandleader. A talent agent secures him a job as a drummer at a society party, unaware that his former band have also been hired. To add to the confusion he masquerades as an aristocrat of the same name. Fortunately in the process he manages to foil some jewel thieves.

== Cast ==
- Lupino Lane as Adolphus Miggs
- Jean Denis as Bubbles O'Hara
- Kathleen Kelly as Peggy Sylvester
- Wallace Lupino as Robbins
- Margaret Yarde as Lady Sylvester
- Arthur Rigby as Sir Henry Sylvester
- Syd Crossley as Curtis
- Reginald Long as Captain Hindlemarsh
- Fred Leslie as Kabitzer
- Hal Gordon as yokel
- Harold Brewer as Baritz
- Arthur Clayton as Sir Arthur Paterson
- Phyllis Clare as nightclub singer

== Production ==
The film was shot at Wembley Studios as a quota quickie for release by the American company Columbia Pictures with sets designed by art director Andrew Mazzei.

== Reception ==
The Monthly Film Bulletin wrote: "The film is played far too much as a theatrical instead of a film comedy and all its faults arise from that. The dream of the unconscious Miggs might have been omitted as being neither beautiful nor amusing. Lupino Lane's acrobatics provide most of the laughter; the rest of the acting is on a level with a good impromptu charade."

The Daily Film Renter wrote: "Indifferent direction fails to infuse poor plot material with either humour or conviction, while climax is halted for interpolation of irrelevant slapstick ballet 'dream' sequence. Main laughs ensue from star's acrobatics and quota of furniture-smashing 'rough house.' Musical side of production is undistinguished. For most uncritical audiences only."

Picturegoer wrote: "Amateurish production on stage lines which is so incredibly weak in plot that it exercises hardly any appeal at all. Lupino Lane's dances are its only asset".
