= Anne Lenner =

British singer (1912–1997)

- Born: Violet Green; 24 December 1912; Aylestone, Leicester, England
- Died: 4 June 1997 (aged 84) Barnet, London, England
- Genres: Traditional pop, British dance band, jazz
- Occupation: Singer
- Years active: circa 1935–1950

Anne Lenner (24 December 1912 – 4 June 1997) was an English vocalist, who sang with the British dance bands of the 1930s and 1940s. She is most closely associated with Carroll Gibbons and the Savoy Orpheans, a band who regularly played at the Savoy Hotel in London, with whom she made many studio recordings. The British bands played a softer version of the swing jazz popular in the USA during the 1930s and 1940s.

== Early life and education ==
Lenner was born Violet Green on 24 December 1912 in Aylestone, Leicester. Her father was Arthur Green, a variety performer who adopted the stage name of Tom Lenner, and toured with his wife, Florence Wright, Anne's mother. Lenner attended school locally at King Richard's Road school.

Lenner had five sisters: Florence (who became Judy Shirley), Maidie, Ida, Rosa (who used the stage name Sally Rose), and Ivy (who became Shirley Lenner, and had a successful career in show business, singing with Joe Loss among others). All the sisters followed their father into show business, apart from Maidie, who married a property millionaire. Lenner also had two brothers, Herbert and Arthur. Herbert died at a young age, and Arthur went on to become a cobbler.

== Career ==
Lenner's first stage appearance was in a family acting, singing and dancing production, billed as "Tom Lenner and his Chicks". Later, Lenner teamed up with Ida and formed "The Lenner Sisters". The two sisters performed in Leicester, with concerts at the de Montfort Hotel, singing on stage at the City Cinema, tea dances at the Palais de Danse in Belgrave Gate, and Sundays at Aylestone Boathouse. The Lenner Sisters song and dance act ended when Ida got married and started a double-act with her new husband. Her elder sister, Jud, paid for Lenner to have dancing lessons, so she could understudy Judy in a production showing at the Loughborough Theatre.

Lenner began performing solo at charity shows, benefits and social clubs. She was soon heard by scouting agents, and by 1933 she was offered engagements in London. She appeared at Jack's Club and the Cabaret Club, where she had to perform with a megaphone. At another engagement in 1934, at Murray's Club in Soho's Beak Street, she was heard by Savoy Hotel bandleader Carroll Gibbons.

Gibbons was so impressed with Lenner's voice that he invited her to record with his group for a Radio Luxembourg broadcast sponsored by Hartley's Jam. The story goes that the session was booked for 9:30am the next morning, but Lenner was late for what was her first really big break. Luckily, Gibbons was so keen that he booked another session with Lenner for later that day. The broadcasts were successful, and Lenner was given a three-year contract to sing with Gibbons at the Savoy Hotel.

The Savoy management initially objected to the presence of a female vocalist, but Gibbons believed in Lenner and he refused to give in. In the event, she stayed with the Carroll Gibbons band for seven years.

Apart from the Hartley's Jam programme, Lenner also appeared with Gibbons in the Ovaltineys, in which she became known to millions of children as "Auntie Anne".

Lenner sang with a gentle "Mayfair" accent, based on received pronunciation, and did not attempt to "project" her voice at the audience. With her soft pure voice, she was ideal for the typically English sounding Savoy Orpheans, and fitted in very well, becoming extremely popular not only with patrons of the Savoy, but also with the record buying public and the huge radio audiences.

As an entertainer, she performed for many prominent audiences. Many of her dresses were designed by Colin Becke, whose sister, Eve Becke, was a vocalist with the band. Lenner recalled: "My days were always very full and time flew. I was very lucky to be singing during a period of the best song writers and I think when British dance music was at its best."

Her contract for the Savoy did not prevent her from recording one song with Joe Loss in 1936, or appearing with Eric Wild and his "Tea-timers", who were regularly on pre-war television from Alexandra Palace. Lenner recalled having to wear green lipstick when on the embryonic TV station. In the same year, she also contributed to bandleader George Scott-Wood's "Fred and Ginger Selection" record, in which she sang "Lovely To Look At" and duetted with Brian Lawrance on "I Won't Dance".

Some of the other standards Lenner recorded, and especially enjoyed, during the 1930s were "All The Things You Are", and "A Foggy Day in London Town", among others. She recorded over 150 titles with Gibbons, both with the full band and with a smaller contingent, which he called his "Boy Friends". It was with the Boy Friends that Lenner made the Hartley's Jam broadcasts mentioned above. These radio programmes were introduced by Jimmy Dyrenforth, who introduced Lenner as the "girl friend".

Lenner spoke very fondly of Gibbons: "To work with, he was the most understanding, gentle and kind person. The boys respected and loved him. He was not only the boss but interested in their private lives and was a friend to all of them. Carroll's boys all looked good and were very versatile, especially George Melachrino who played oboe, viola and sax and Reg Leopold who played violin, viola and sax. I loved singing with the full orchestra but also enjoyed sessions with The Boyfriends and the sweet trumpet of Bill Shakespeare. Through Carroll's influence, I enjoyed tremendous respect and kindness from all of them."

Lenner left the Savoy Hotel in 1941 to spend more time with her husband. Nevertheless, she kept up her broadcasting and recording dates with the Savoy Orpheans. She also appeared on BBC radio in the weekly series Composer Cavalcade with the BBC Concert Orchestra directed by organist Sidney Torch. She shared the singing spots with Denny Dennis, George Melachrino and Sam Costa, all of whom were by now in the armed forces. She was also in demand for ENSA shows and was called upon to sing at official Government functions; Lenner performed in front of Winston Churchill and General Dwight D. Eisenhower among others.

She appeared in the 1940 British comedy film Garrison Follies, which also included David Tomlinson(in his film debut) and Barry Lupino; on another occasion, her singing voice was dubbed for actress Ann Todd.

During the war years, Lenner sang with a number of other bands, notably Jay Wilbur, Jack White, Louis Levy, and Frank Weir at the Astor Club, where George Shearing was in the band. She only recorded a handful of songs with these bands. She also recorded just one song with Maurice Winnick; on the other side of the record, Al Bowlly took the vocal. Lenner also sang on broadcasts with the Stan Atkins' Band around this time.

After the war, she did troop shows in Austria, Germany and Italy; one of these was with her trio, which included Spike Milligan on vocals and guitar of whom she later said: "He is a lovely man, so talented. We still keep in touch and I visit him and his wife at their lovely Sussex home." Her overseas work also included Monte Carlo, where she had a show at the Casino and in Paris where she sang with Bert Firman. She never sang in the USA; a tour was planned, but halted by the outbreak of the war.

Back in the United Kingdom, Lenner was singing solo. She could also be found teaming up with Bob Harvey for a double-act entitled "Just The Two of Us".

Lenner noticed that the entertainment world was changing, and decided to retire from show business. Her nephew, John Doyle, believed that her voice had started to fail, which may have been partly due to heavy smoking and the strain placed on her vocal cords by working without microphones during her early career. By now, her marriage to Gordon Little was over and she was looking for a new direction. Following a chance meeting with an admirer from the Savoy days, she managed to get a job as a telephonist in the Civil Service, working for the security services. Lenner produced the annual Civil Service show on several occasions.

== Personal life and death ==
Lenner married a dance producer by the name of Piddock, whom she met while appearing in a review produced by him. They had a son, Jeffrey, who went into show business under the name of Jeffrey Lenner. Jeffery was educated at Bedford School but ran away to join the Ice Follies which came through town when he was in the 6th Form. Jeffrey found it difficult to obtain work after his return from Australia, where he had hosted his own television programme, and he was never able to emulate the success of his mother.

Lenner attended Brooklands motor racing circuit during the 1930s. Around the outbreak of World War II, Lenner married for a second time, to up-and-coming actor Gordon Little, who was in the Navy, stationed at Portsmouth. Lenner rented a house in Warsash, Hampshire, to be near her husband, who commanded a torpedo boat during the war, with the flotilla moored near Warsash. The couple hosted many parties in their home. Lenner and a friend, Eustace Hoey, opened the Ward Room, a club in Curzon Street, London especially for Gordon, so he and his Navy friends had somewhere to go on their visits to London. The couple's marriage did not last for long after the war, however. There were no children, and Lenner did not marry again.

After her retirement, Lenner lived for many years in Edgware, north London, in an uncomfortable flat opposite Edgware station. She spent a lot of her later years caring for her mother, who died at 102 years of age. Despite her previously glamorous life, Lenner never complained about her reduced circumstances in her later years.

During the 1970s and 1980s, she worked for Post Office Telephones (now BT Plc) at their Sales offices in 6-7 Clifford Street, Mayfair, London and in 77 Oxford Street, London, she made a live broadcast for the BBC from the Queen Elizabeth Hall, Southbank, London during the late 1970s and retired from British Telecom in the 1980s.

Lenner died at the age of 84, on 4 June 1997, at Barnet Hospital.

Gibbons' widow Joan recalls, "Anne was a marvellous raconteur, a very quick brain and with a strong sense of humour. She once told me that she would have liked to have been a comedienne. She suffered from failing eyesight towards the end of her life and found it difficult to get around."

== Films ==
- Garrison Follies (1940)
