= Twenty to One =

Twenty to One was a British musical comedy first performed in 1935. The musical was a farce set around the world of horseracing. Bill Snibson (Lupino Lane), a bookmaker, joins an anti-gambling organisation in a fit of guilt. It ran for other four hundred performances at the Coliseum Theatre in the West End. Combined with provincial tours it ran for over a thousand shows. It was written by Louis Arthur Rose. The music was composed by Billy Mayerl.

The lead character of Bill Snibson was such a success, that he was revived in 1937 for another musical Me and My Girl. This proved to be an even greater hit with its well-known song "The Lambeth Walk". It was adapted into a film in 1939.

== Bibliography ==
- Shafer, Stephen C. British popular films, 1929-1939: The Cinema of Reassurance. Routledge, 1997.
