= Chinatown Nights =

Chinatown Nights may refer to:

- Chinatown Nights (1929 film), an American film
- Chinatown Nights (1938 film), a British film
