= Richard Lupino =

American actor (1929–2005)

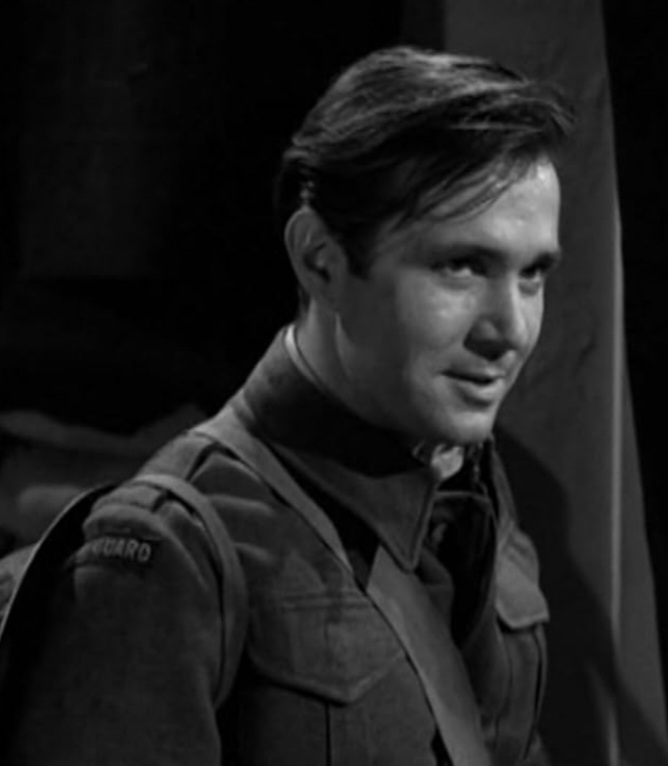
- Lupino in an episode of One Step Beyond (1960)
- Born: Henry Richard Lupino; 29 October 1929; Hollywood, California, U.S.
- Died: 9 February 2005 (aged 75); New York City, U.S.
- Other names: Richard Lane; Dicky Lupino
- Years active: 1940-1983
- Spouse: Pandora Bronson (?-2005) (his death)
- Parent: Wallace Lupino (father)
- Relatives: Lupino Lane (uncle); Stanley Lupino (uncle); Ida Lupino (cousin)

Richard Lupino (29 October 1929 – 9 February 2005) was an American film, stage and television actor, of British parentage, part of the theatrical Lupino family.

He was born in Hollywood to British actor Wallace Lupino and his wife Rose. He worked as a medic in Korea with the rank of corporal.^{[6]} He trained at the Royal Academy of Dramatic Art in London, where he graduated on July 1, 1945. He was married to Pandora Bronson Lupino.

He appeared in a handful of films between 1940 and 1973, making his debut at the age of ten as Just William in the film of the same name (1940). He was also active on the stage, in regional theater, on Broadway, in London, in Sydney, Australia, and appeared frequently on US television from the 1950s to the 1970s. From 1972 to 1977, he played Earl Goodman, in the controversial Australian TV serial Number 96.

He was a founding member of the Charles Laughton Shakespeare Group. ^{[6]} In 2002, his play, The Evening Shift, was performed off-off-Broadway, and was later optioned for film. ^{[6]} He wrote several television scripts with his cousin, the actress and director Ida Lupino.

== Death ==
He died of complications from non-Hodgkin's lymphoma in 2005, aged 75.^{[6]}

== Filmography ==
Year	Title	Role	Notes
1940	Just William	William Brown	
1949	That Forsyte Woman	Chester Forsyte	Uncredited
1950	Kim	Sentry	Uncredited
1951	Royal Wedding	Singing Elevator Boy	Uncredited
1954	Rhapsody	Otto Krafft	
1955	Strategic Air Command	Lieutenant - Controller	Uncredited
1955	The Marauders	Perc Kettering	
1955	The Sea Chase	British Officer of the Watch	Uncredited
1959	Alfred Hitchcock Presents	Ives	Season 4 Episode 24: "The Avon Emeralds"
1959	Never So Few	Mike Island	
1960	Alfred Hitchcock Presents	Press Photographer	Season 5 Episode 29: "The Hero"
1960	Midnight Lace	Foster	
1963	The New Phil Silvers Show	Christopher Hawthorne	TV series, episode "The Son of Pygmalion"
1964	Father Goose	Radioman	Uncredited
1964	The Alfred Hitchcock Hour	James Willis, the Author	Season 2 Episode 19: "Murder Case"
1965	The Alfred Hitchcock Hour	Guerny, Jr.	Season 3 Episode 22: "Thou Still Unravished Bride"
1973	Avengers of the Reef		

== See also ==
- Lupino family
