= Trust the Navy =

- Directed by: Lupino Lane
- Written by: Arthur Rigby; Reginald Long; L. Arthur Rose
- Produced by: Ian Sutherland
- Starring: Lupino Lane; Nancy Burne; Wallace Lupino; Guy Middleton
- Music by: Billy Mayerl
- Production company: St. George's Pictures
- Distributed by: Columbia Pictures
- Release date: December 1935
- Running time: 71 minutes
- Country: United Kingdom
- Language: English

Trust the Navy is a 1935 British comedy film directed by Lupino Lane and starring Lane, Nancy Burne and Wallace Lupino. It was made at Cricklewood Studios. It marked the screen debut of Guy Middleton, who went on to be a leading character actor in British films of the following decades.

== Preservation status ==
The British Film Institute National Archive holds a collection of stills but no film or video materials.

== Plot ==
On shore leave, seamen pals Nip Briggs and Wally Wopping uncover a smugglers' den in the cellar of the Grand Hotel. The crooks escape, but on the following night at a Naval ball, the smugglers kidnap some of the guests and take them to their ship. Wally and Nip follow and manage to round the criminals up.

== Cast ==
- Lupino Lane as Nip Briggs
- Nancy Burne as Susie
- Wallace Lupino as Wally Wopping
- Guy Middleton as Lieutenant Richmond
- Miki Hood as Andree Terraine
- Ben Welden as Scar
- Fred Leslie as Chief Petty Officer
- Doris Rogers as Martha
- Reginald Long as Serge Chungster
- Arthur Rigby as Lambert Terrain
- Charles Sewell
- Arthur Stanley

== Reception ==
The Monthly Film Bulletin wrote: "There is little originality in the story, the situations or even the jokes, but of its kind this is a very good edition. Music and dancing are pleasant. The Lupinos have the screen to themselves most of the time and give the best of their own type of humour."

Kine Weekly wrote: "Slapstick farce with a naval background, and most of the old Navy jokes and a great many old civilian jokes as well. This is a type of film which is almost impossible to classify, because it never keeps to one style for more than a reel or so; there is no suggestion of musical comedy proper, although every now and then the characters break into song with little or no excuse – and the songs and singing are by no means the strongest part of the show. There is also an attempt at melodrama here and there, which hardly convinces."

The Daily Film Renter wrote: "Artless combination of comedy and melodrama ... Main entertainment derives from comicalities of star and occasional song numbers, which are somewhat irrelevantly introduced. Poor material, it may probably entertain the most indulgent patrons."
