= Mark Melford =

British author, actor and variety artist (c.1850–1914)

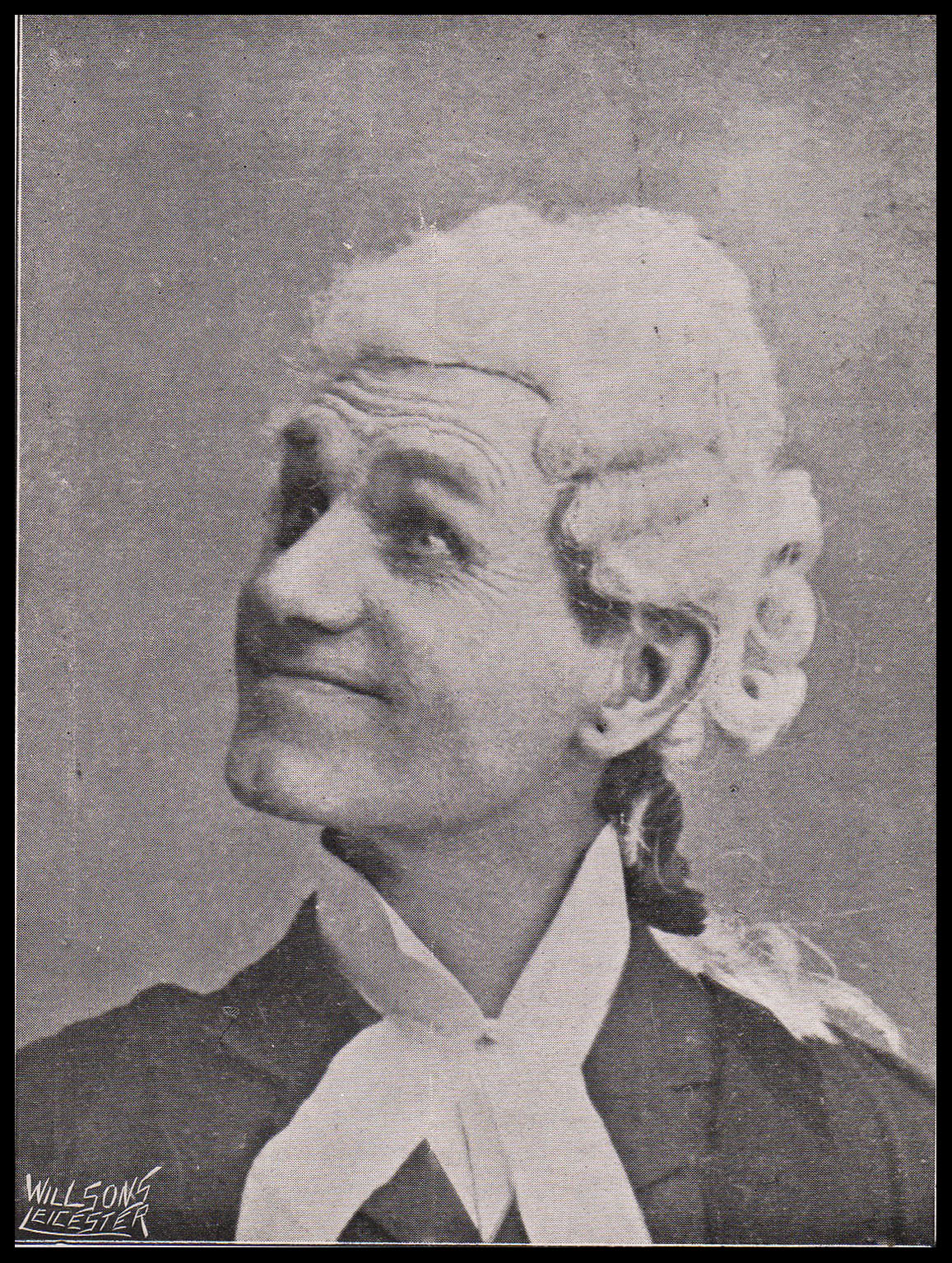
- Mark Melford in Non-suited c.1900
- Born: c. 1850; Fareham, Hampshire, England
- Died: 4 January 1914; North Hammersmith, London, England
- Occupations: Playwright, actor, author, political activist
- Writing career
- Genres: Farce, melodrama, comedy, drama

Signature
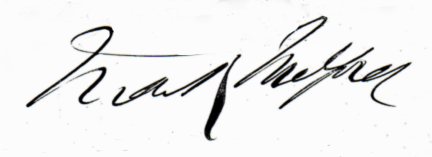

Mark Melford (c. 1850 – 4 January 1914) was an English playwright, actor, and variety performer. His career encompassed the era of the late Victorian farce, the music halls and early British cinema. Melford was a prolific playwright and wrote not only dramas, farces, melodramas and comic sketches, but also a musical drama, and a comic opera. He was also an accomplished comic actor often taking the leading role in his own works.

As a playwright, the genre in which he was most prolific was farce; Jeffrey H. Huberman in his Late Victorian Farce writes that Melford wrote and had produced more full-length original farces than any other Victorian playwright. The hand-list of plays in Allardyce Nicoll's six-volume A History of English Drama, 1660-1900 lists thirty nine works by Melford up to 1900. From 1912 onwards he also wrote, directed, and acted in many short silent films.

== Early life ==
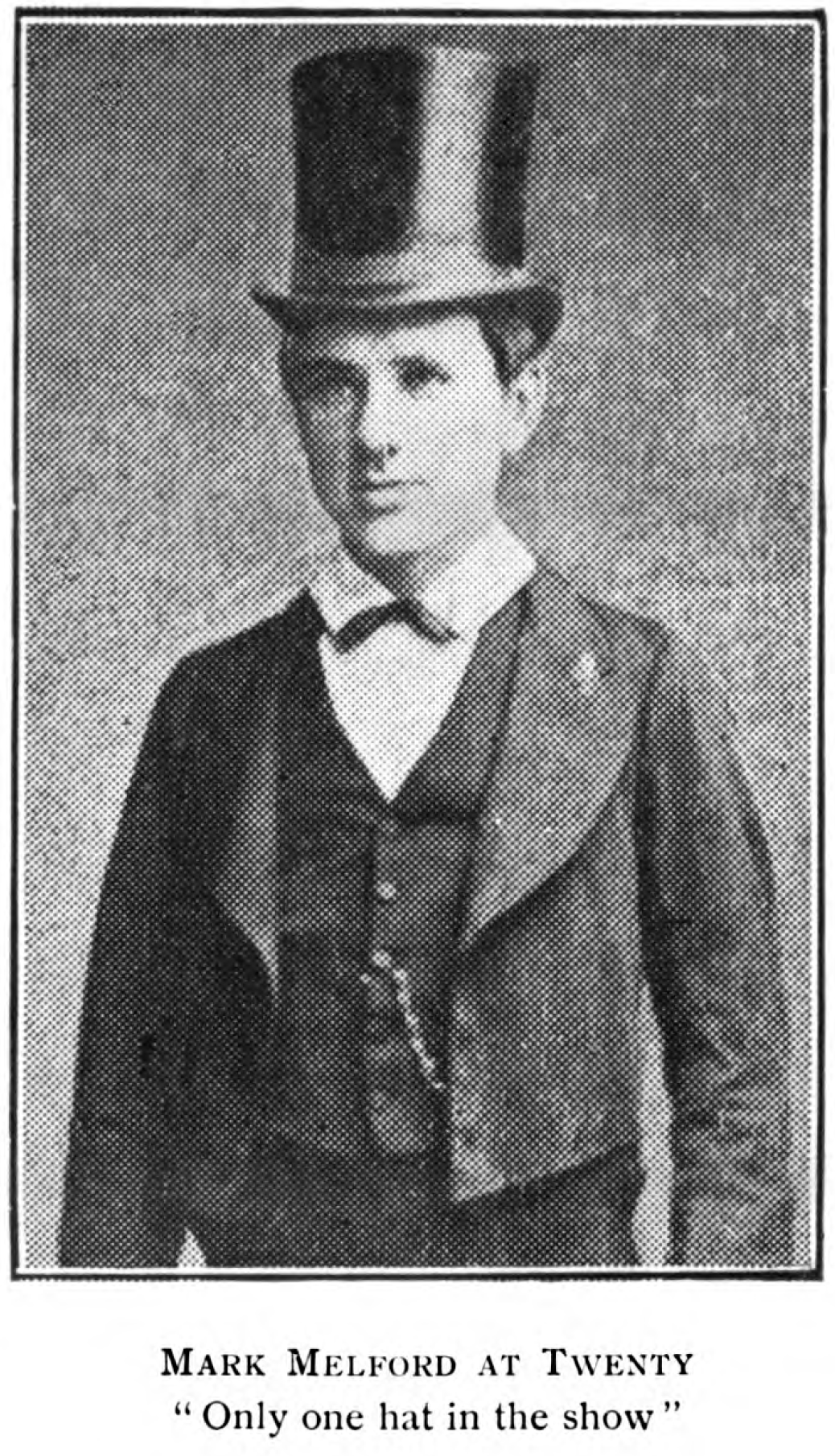

Born George Smith in Fareham, Hampshire, England, he was the son of Joseph Smith, a provisions merchant, and Priscilla Hill the daughter of a farmer. From humble beginnings working in the family business he became well known under his stage name, Melford, as an actor and dramatic author. He and his brother Alfred (later to become Austin Melford) were known in the Portsmouth area as the 'Humorous Brothers'. Alfred first appeared as an amateur in Portsmouth, carrying off all prizes at singing contests with character songs, written by his brother Mark.

== Actor ==
During his twenties he joined a travelling portable theatre company, or booth, in the North Country of England. His adventures over the fifteen months he spent with the booth theatre are recounted in his book Life in a Booth and Something More. Later he worked in the theatre with Charles Rice, Charles James Mathews, Mrs Rousby, Walter Speakman, Eloise Juno, Willie Edouin, Alice Atherton, and Oswald Stoll, theatre manager, and the co-founder of the Stoll Moss Group theatre company. He advertised himself in his early career as an actor able to play the 'heavy lead' or villain, and burlesque, or 'character' parts. He was known affectionately in his hometown Portsmouth area, by the soubriquet "Rhymeo", and the Portsmouth Evening News noted his special rapport with the audience: "a mutual good feeling appears to exist between the performer and the public from the moment Rhymeo's genial countenance smiles upon them." In 1898 The Stage wrote "It is well nigh impossible not to laugh when Mr. Melford occupies the stage, his odd grimaces, quick and extraordinary gestures, quaint antics, and generally comic behaviour make him a most droll comedian."

== Dramatic author ==
He began writing and performing poems, songs, plays and recitations as a Portsmouth schoolboy. As an established author his plays were reputedly swiftly written in an almost indecipherable hand; his manuscripts were never revised, and went to the typewriter as written.

Around 1883 he became actor-manager of Melford's Comedy Company, later known as Melford and Company. The company performed his own plays, and he claimed that his tours with Kleptomania, Flying from Justice, Secrets of the Police, were all great financial successes. In 1886, he sold the rights to Turned Up to Willie Edouin for 25 pounds and a royalty of one pound per performance. Turned Up was performed as far afield as Perth in Western Australia and was later made into a film called Who's Your Father.

Some of his works dealt with serious topics, but were usually seen through the prism of comedy, and not always sympathetically. Kleptomania: A Farcical Comedy in Three Acts, first performed in 1888, "lampooned the concept of kleptomania and the wealthy women who supposedly suffered from the disorder." He wrote at least one other farce based on a mental disorder, A Screw Loose, in 1893; and also a drama in four acts called The Maelstrom about a homicidal maniac. Originally titled A Hidden Terror the play was performed in London at the Shaftesbury Theatre in 1892, to mixed reviews. The Era wrote "The Maelstrom is decidedly a remarkable play; and though ... we do not believe that there is much 'money in it' for London; we must give to the author the credit due to daring and fertility." But The People newspaper severely criticised the play. In response Melford brought an action for libel against the newspaper and won damages of £50. William Moy Thomas in his review of A Screw Loose in The Graphic wrote "Lunacy as a basis of farce is obviously a material that may easily be made offensive; but Mr Melford handles it with such excellent discretion and keeps the humorous side of things so constantly in view throughout the genuinely comic imbroglio, that his audience are always in good humour."

The "frivolously farcical comedy" Frivolity was written by Melford for The Leopolds, a family of performing acrobats. The troupe's gymnastic and musical abilities were melded into a story line involving an elopement, some students, a pursuit to France and some lively adventures in Paris. The play was first performed in Liverpool in 1893 and The Leopolds toured with an "embroidered" version of it for at least ten years. Turned Up, 1886, was arguably his most successful work. Jeffrey H. Huberman says that the play's "combination of standard stereotypes, at least one unforgettable eccentric, and some of the wildest act-ending spectacle ever, helped to make Turned Up one of the most popular plays of the genre."

== Later career ==
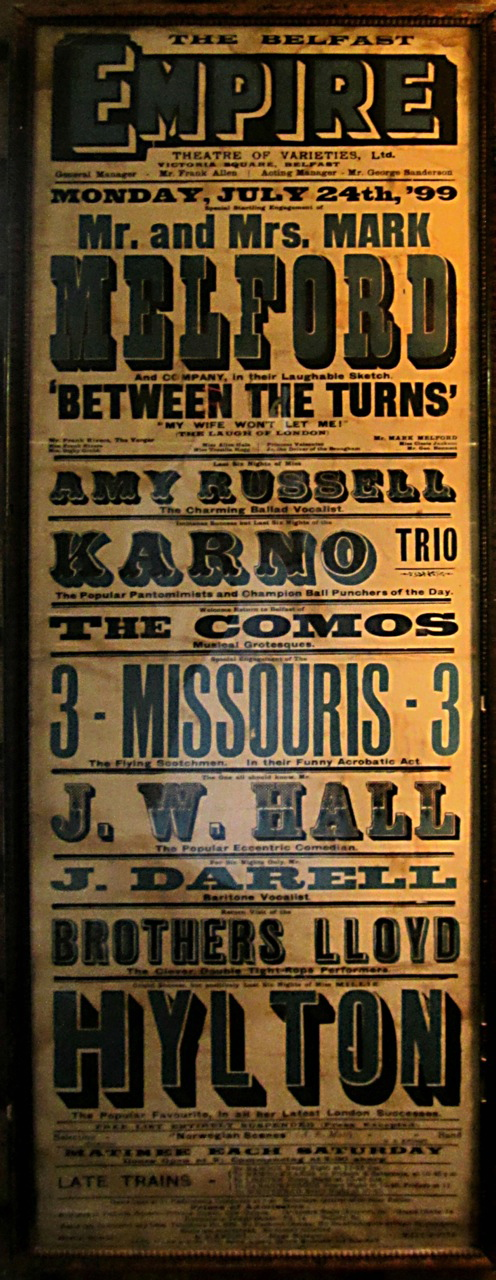

In the late nineteenth century the three-act extreme farce was falling out of favour, and music hall variety shows became more popular. From the mid-1890s Melford wrote and performed many short farcical sketches in this genre, and for the next 15 years he and his company appeared frequently at the London Pavilion Music Hall. Coincidentally Desperation was one of the first of his one-act farcical sketches to be played at the London Pavilion, in 1896, and was also one of the last, in 1908.

=== Non-suited ===
Non-suited, titled "an illegal sketch in one scene" on the playscript cover, opened in London at The Pavilion in September 1899, and was his most successful comic sketch. The plot involves a breach of promise suit, and Melford himself usually took the title role of the barrister. Later Miss Marie Dalroyde purchased the provincial rights to the 20 minute sketch, for a then record price of £500, worth almost £45,000 British pounds today. His last performance in this role was at his farewell benefit concert in late 1913 at the Little Theatre in John Street, London, a few months before his death.

=== Films ===
In 1912 Mark became involved with the early silent film industry. Heron Films Ltd. was established in 1912 by Arthur Melbourne-Cooper and Andrew Heron in order to produce films with Melford's theatrical company. He wrote, directed, and played in many short films although, apart from an excerpt from The Herncrake Witch, none of his films are known to exist today. His play Flying from Justice was produced by Neptune Films as a silent black and white movie in 1914, directed by Percy Nash. Turned Up (original title Too Much Married) was adapted for the cinema and produced as Who’s Your Father in 1935, directed by and starring Lupino Lane.

== Political activism ==
Melford was a free thinker, humanist, anti-vivisectionist, animal welfare activist, and supporter of women's suffrage, as documented in Life in a Booth and Something More. He was actively opposed to cruelty towards performing animals and was instrumental in bringing at least one such case, concerning performing elephants, before the courts.

== Personal life ==
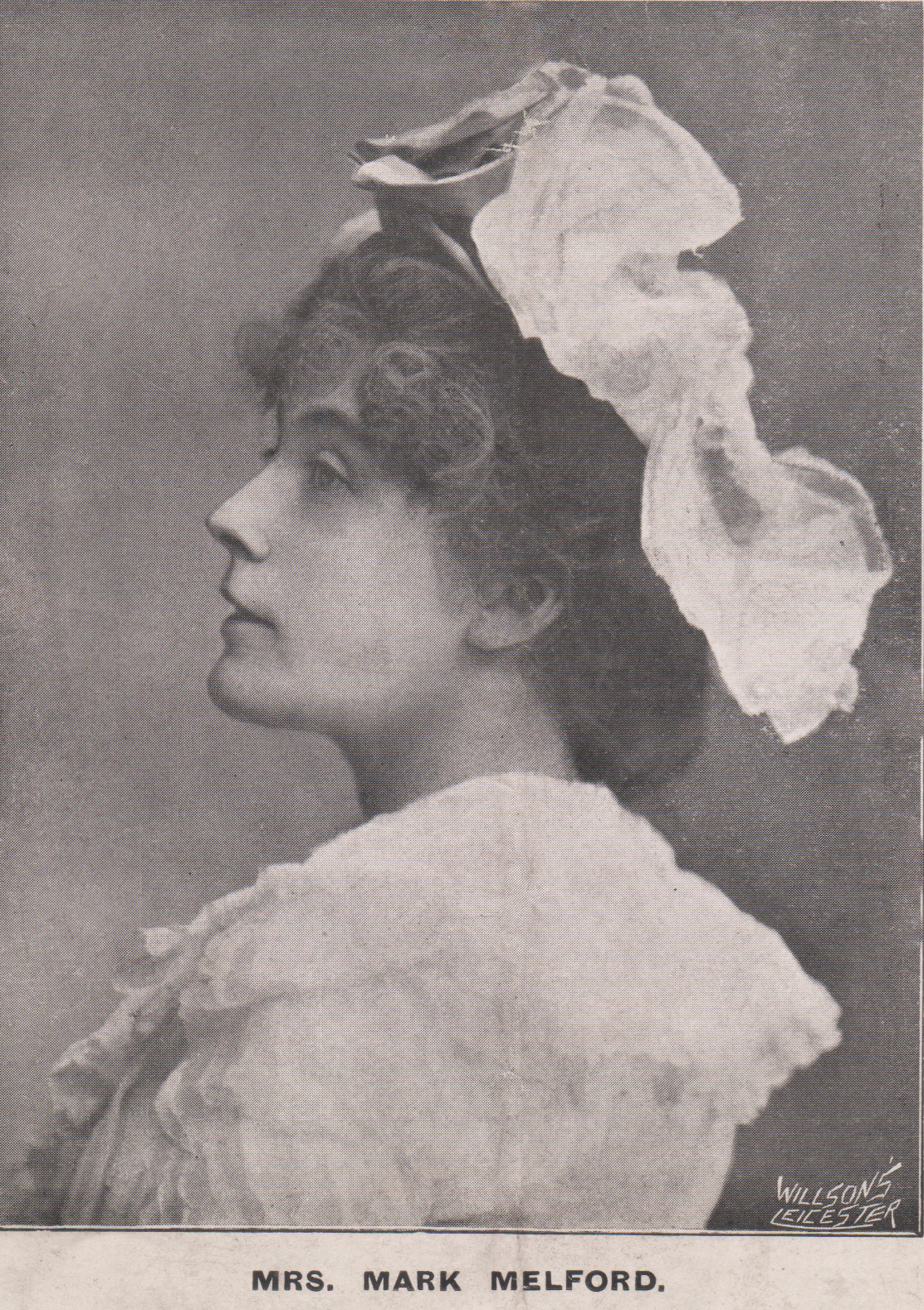

On 9 May 1887 he married Ethel Byford, an actress and sister of Roy Byford, also an actor. They had four children Jackeydawra, Benjamin (died young), Paul and Mavis. Jackeydawra, his eldest daughter, born Alice Bradshaw Jackeydora Melford, was one of the early British women pioneers of film.

He had a fondness for birds, especially jackdaws, jays and magpies. At their house, "The Jackdaw’s Nest" on the outskirts of Southampton, a whole room was left just for his birds. The window was left open and they were free to roam the countryside at will, only coming home to roost at night.

He died on 5 January 1914 and his death was reported widely, even in the New York Times. The Liverpool Echo reported that he "died with his pen in his hand." Mr Bransby Williams said that, after being in bed practically helpless for some months, Mark rallied and wrote 3,000 words of his unfinished book in the last few days before his death. He was cremated at Golders Green, "the ceremony, in accordance with the deceased artist's expressed wishes, being of the simplest possible character".

== Selected works ==
=== Selected Plays ===
- Frivolity, farcical comedy, 1883, written for the acrobatic troupe The Leopolds
- No Mercy, drama in five acts, 1883
- Blackberries, comic drama, 1886
- Too Much Married, Farce, 1886; later became Turned Up, 1891
- Ivy, four-act comic drama, 1887
- Kleptomania, farcical comedy in three acts, 1888
- The Hidden Terror, 1889; later became The Maelstrom, 1892
- The Best Man Wins, farce, 1890
- Flying From Justice, melodrama, 1890
- Jackeydora; or, The Last Witch, comic opera, 1890, music by Popsie Rowe
- The Rope Merchant, sketch, 1890
- The Jerry Builder, farcical comedy, 1892
- A Screw Loose, farcical comedy, 1893
- Skyward Guide, drama, 1895; co-writer Mrs Alfred Bradshaw
- Desperation, comic sketch, 1896
- Black and White, musical drama, 1897; with J. Crook and W. Sapte.
- A Hampshire Hog, dramatic sketch, 1899
- Non-suited, comic sketch,1900

=== Filmography ===
==== Writer ====
- 1912 The Courtier Caught (Short)
- 1912 A Day's Sport (Short)
- 1912 The Land of the Nursery Rhymes (Short) (story)
- 1912 The Herncrake Witch (Short) (story)
- 1912 His First Sovereign (Short)
- 1913 Wanted: A Husband (Short) (sketch)
- 1913 Flying from Justice (Short) (play)
- 1913 Only a Wedding (Short) (sketch)

==== Director ====
- 1912 His First Sovereign (Short)
- 1912 The Herncrake Witch (Short)
- 1912 The Land of the Nursery Rhymes (Short)
- 1912 A Day's Sport (Short)
- 1912 The Courtier Caught (Short)
- 1913 Gretna Green (Short)
- 1913 Bottled Courage (Short)
- 1913 Pat's Idea (Short)

==== Actor ====
Mr Melford also appeared as an actor in all of the above films as well as

- The Inn on the Heath, 1914, written and directed by Jackeydawra Melford.

==== Film adaptations ====
- 1915, Flying from Justice (from the play "Flying from Justice" 1890)
- 1935, Who's Your Father (from the play "Turned Up" 1891)

== Further reference ==
- Abelson, Elaine S. (1989). The Invention of Kleptomania Signs, Vol. 15, No. 1 (Autumn, 1989), pp. 123–143 Published by: The University of Chicago Press https://www.jstor.org/stable/3174709
- Baker, Richard Anthony (2014). British Music Hall:an Illustrated History. Barnsley, South Yorkshire: Pen & Sword. ISBN 9781783831180
- Booth, Michael Richard (1991). Theatre in the Victorian Age. Cambridge: Cambridge University Press. ISBN 9780521348379
- Gill, Maude (1948) See The Players. 2nd edition. Birmingham: George Ronald
- Harrop, Josephine (1989). Victorian Portable Theatres. London: The Society for Theatre Research. ISBN 0854300473
- Hudson, W. H. (1920) Birds in Town and Village. New York: E. P. Dutton
- Huberman, Jeffrey H. (1986) Late Victorian Farce. Ann Arbor, Michigan: UMI Research Press.
- Leach, Robert (2013). Theatre Studies: The basics. 2nd edition. New York: Routledge, 2013
- Mayer, David (2006) "Why Girls Leave Home": Victorian and Edwardian "Bad-Girl" Melodrama Parodied in Early Film Theatre Journal, Vol. 58, No. 4, Film and Theatre (December 2006), pp. 575–593 Published by: The Johns Hopkins University Press https://www.jstor.org/stable/25069916
- Melford, Mark (1913) Life in a Booth and Something More. London: Hendersons
- Russell, Virginia. The Illegitimate Adventures of a Theatrical Eccentric. Mistry Press, 2017.
- Stephens, John Russell (1992) The Profession of the Playwright: British Theatre 1800-1900 Cambridge: Cambridge University Press ISBN 0521259134
- Whitlock, Tammy (1999) Gender, Medicine, and Consumer Culture in Victorian England: Creating the Kleptomaniac Albion: A Quarterly Journal Concerned with British Studies Vol. 31, No. 3 (Autumn, 1999), pp. 413–437Published by: The North American Conference on British Studies https://www.jstor.org/stable/4052958 p. 413
