= Alan Wheatley =

English actor (1907–1991)

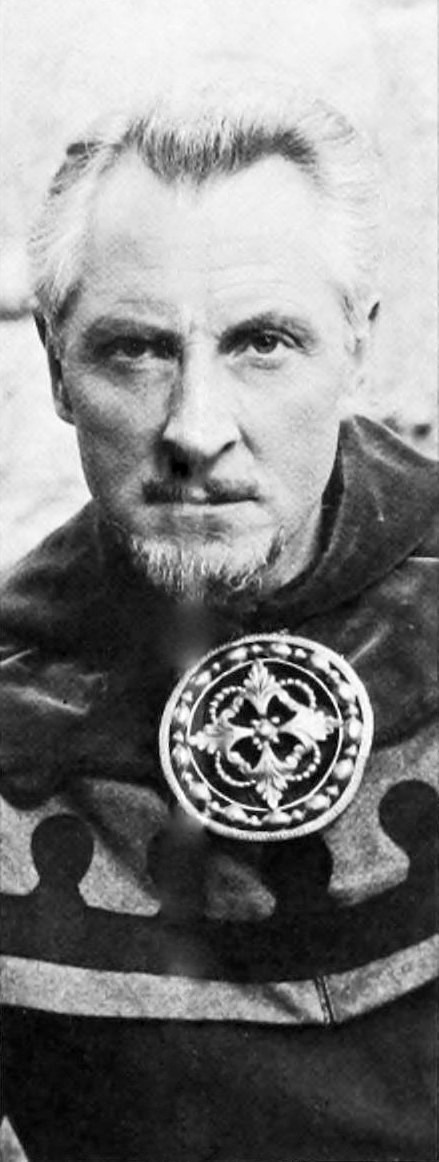
- Wheatley as the Sheriff of Nottingham in The Adventures of Robin Hood
- Born: 19 April 1907; Tolworth, Surrey, England
- Died: 30 August 1991 (aged 84); Westminster, London, England
- Occupations: Actor and radio announcer

Alan Wheatley (19 April 1907 – 30 August 1991) was an English actor. He was a well known stage actor in the 1930s, 1940s and 1950s, appeared in forty films between 1931 and 1965 and was a frequent broadcaster on radio from the 1930s to the 1990s, and on television from 1938 to 1964. His most prominent television role was the Sheriff of Nottingham in the 1950s TV series The Adventures of Robin Hood, with Richard Greene as Robin Hood; Wheatley played the sheriff in 54 episodes between 1955 and 1959. Earlier, he had played Sherlock Holmes in the first television series featuring the great detective.

In addition to acting, Wheatley was a radio announcer during the Second World War, broadcasting to occupied Europe, where he became a well known voice. Poetry was another of his interests: he translated the poetry of Federico García Lorca and was a frequent reader of poems on air. In his later years he worked mainly in radio, as a narrator, a verse-reader and an actor.

== Life and career ==
=== Early years ===
Wheatley was born in Tolworth, Surrey, on 19 April 1907, the son of William Henry Wheatley and his wife Rose Eva (née Towers). He was educated at Tiffin School, and was then employed in industrial psychology. He made his first appearance on the stage at the Festival Theatre, Cambridge in October 1928, as Randall Utterword in Heartbreak House, after which he was a member of the repertory company at that theatre and later in Hull. In 1930 he toured as Sir Roger Fairfax in Sweet Nell of Old Drury with Fred Terry, and in 1931 in The Quaker Girl.

In November 1931 Wheatley performed in London at the Embassy and St Martin's theatres, as the Journalist in Britannia of Billingsgate. In other London productions in 1932–33 he played the Guide in Miracle at Verdun, Master Klaus in The Witch and Godfrey Perry in Wild Justice. He appeared at the Malvern Festival in August 1933, before returning to the West End, where his roles included Edgar in King Lear to the Lear of William Devlin.

For nine months in 1934–35 Wheatley was leading man at the Croydon Repertory Theatre, and in 1936 he made his first appearance with the Old Vic company. He made his Broadway debut in the same year, in the Old Vic's production of St Helena, playing Las Cases to the Bonaparte of Maurice Evans. He subsequently toured in Scandinavia and adjoining countries, as Major Petkoff in Arms and the Man and Arnold Champion-Cheney in The Circle.

After returning to London, Wheatley's last stage roles of the 1930s were Disraeli in Mr Gladstone, with Devlin; Mosca in Volpone, with Donald Wolfit; Frank Harris in Oscar Wilde with Francis L. Sullivan; Sebastian in Walk in the Sun, with Terence de Marney; and Sir Patrick Cullen in The Doctor's Dilemma, with Clifford Evans. He appeared in several films in the 1930s (see Filmography below), and, already a frequent broadcaster on BBC radio, he made his first television appearance in August 1938, playing Lane in The Importance of Being Earnest. In the same year he played Sam Weller in Bardell against Pickwick, adapted from The Pickwick Papers.

=== War and post-war ===
In September 1939 at the time of the outbreak of the Second World War Wheatley joined the BBC Drama Repertory Company. From May to September 1940 he was an announcer on the BBC Overseas Service and then until March 1945 he was principal announcer and newsreader for the BBC European Service. The Times said of him, "His clarity of diction and balanced speaking voice became well known in war-time Europe, where people in occupied countries turned to the BBC for information".

While serving with the European Service Wheatley met Rafael Nadal, a friend of Federico García Lorca, and developed an interest in the poet's works. He made English translations of several of them; "Lament on the Death of a Bullfighter" was the first to be completed, and was broadcast by the BBC in 1946. He recorded nine of his translations for the gramophone in 1953, released in Britain on the Argo label and in the US by Westminster Records.

When BBC television resumed after its suspension during the war, Wheatley played a wide range of characters, from Sam Weller again (1946), to the humorously cynical schoolmaster Rupert Billings in The Happiest Days of Your Life (1949) and the tragic king in Richard II (1950). The Manchester Guardian called the last "a brilliant performance: television acting at its best". Wheatley's film credits in the 1940s include Caesar and Cleopatra (1945), The Rake's Progress (1945), Appointment with Crime (1946), Brighton Rock (1947) and Calling Paul Temple (1948).

In 1945 Wheatley rejoined the Old Vic company, touring as Mercutio in Romeo and Juliet. At the end of the year he joined the company at the Mercury Theatre, London, where his roles included the Greek and Tegeus in a double bill of W. B. Yeats's The Resurrection and Christopher Fry's A Phoenix Too Frequent, Julian in Ronald Duncan's This Way to the Tomb (which the cast also played at the Studio Champs-Elysées in Paris and the Garrick Theatre, London), and Harry in T. S. Eliot's The Family Reunion. In 1949 he played the title role in Hamlet at the Richmond Theatre. The reviewer in The Stage thought Wheatley displayed "a good voice and presence" in the role but was "rather lightweight".

=== 1950s ===
In 1951 Wheatley played Sherlock Holmes in a series of six televised dramatisations of Conan Doyle stories. Holmes had been played on television before, in one-off adaptations, but this was the first series to feature him. Wheatley's co-stars were Raymond Francis as Dr Watson and Bill Owen as Inspector Lestrade. The Times commented that as Holmes, Wheatley "catches the essential character. He is a figure, not merely of wonder or of fun, but of romantic possibility". No audio or video recordings of the productions are known to exist.

Between 1955 and 1959 Wheatley is recorded by the British Film Institute as appearing in 54 episodes of the ABC television series The Adventures of Robin Hood as the Sheriff of Nottingham, the perpetual adversary of Robin (Richard Greene). He played the role "with many a villainous smile", as The Times said, but eventually withdrew from it. His colleague Peter Cotes said that the part made him into a well known "personality", and although he was regarded by colleagues as "the best high comedy actor in Britain", and "daring", "haunting" and "moving" in various roles, nonetheless, after the Robin Hood series he was, in the words of an obituarist, "more inclined to be cast as a suave villain than as a hero". Concurrently with some of the Robin Hood series, Wheatley played Pontius Pilate in a BBC television religious drama series, Jesus of Nazareth first shown in 1956. His other television roles of the 1950s included Rupert Cadell in Rope (1953) and the murderous Jonathan Brewster in the comedy Arsenic and Old Lace (1958). His film roles included Inspector Braddock in The Limping Man (1953) and Inspector MacLennan in The House Across the Lake (1954).

Wheatley's entry in Who's Who in the Theatre records no stage appearances by him between 1952 and 1959. In February 1959 he played Edgar Marr in an American thriller, House Without Windows. In December of the same year he played Abanazar in Aladdin, a lavish show at the London Coliseum, with songs by Cole Porter, production and choreography by Robert Helpmann, and co-starring Bob Monkhouse, Ian Wallace and Ronald Shiner.

=== Later years ===
In the 1960s, Wheatley continued to broadcast frequently on television and radio. He played Richard D'Oyly Carte in a three-part BBC television series Gilbert and Sullivan: The Immortal Jesters (1961), and appeared in episodes of Maigret (1962 and 1963), Doctor Who, where his character was the first ever to be seen being killed by a dalek and Compact, both in 1964. In the same year he played Prince Rohat, Minister of the Interior, in Victor Canning's six-part drama The Midnight Men. His last cinema role listed by the British Film Institute was Major Ronald Grey-Simmons in Clash by Night (1965).

In later years, Wheatley worked mostly on radio, as narrator and poetry-reader as well as actor. In 1975, he played Judas Iscariot in the 12-part cycle The Man Born to be King by Dorothy L. Sayers. He acted in adaptations of plays by writers including Noël Coward and Somerset Maugham, and of novels by Alexandre Dumas, James Hilton, Anthony Powell and C. P. Snow among others. He made his final appearance in 1991 in a BBC Radio 4 adaptation of A Day by the Sea, with Wendy Hiller and Michael Hordern, both old friends of his.

Wheatley died of a heart attack in Westminster, London on 30 August 1991, aged 84.

== Filmography ==
Year	Title	Role	Notes
1931	Out of the Blue	Extra	Uncredited
1931	The Love Race	Extra	Uncredited
1936	The Conquest of Air	Borelli	
1937	William Tindale	William Tindale	
1944	Love Story	Partygoer	Uncredited
1945	The Rake's Progress	Edwards	
1945	Caesar and Cleopatra	Persian	
1946	Appointment with Crime	Noel Penn	
1946	Spring Song	Menelli	
1947	Jassy	Sir Edward Walker	
1947	The End of the River	Irygoyen	
1947	Brighton Rock	Fred Hale	
1948	Corridor of Mirrors	Edgar Orsen	
1948	Counterblast	M.W. Kennedy	
1948	Calling Paul Temple	Edward Lathom	
1948	Sleeping Car to Trieste	Karl / Charles Pool	
1949	It's Not Cricket	Felix	
1949	For Them That Trespass	Librarian	Uncredited
1951	Home to Danger	Hughes	
1952	Whispering Smith Hits London	Reith	
1952	The Pickwick Papers	Fogg	
1953	Spaceways	Dr Smith	
1953	The Limping Man	Inspector Braddock	
1953	Small Town Story	Nick Hammond	
1954	The Javenese Dagger	Victor	Short
1954	The Diamond	Thompson Blake	
1954	The House Across the Lake	Inspector MacLennan	
1954	Delayed Action	Mark Cruden	
1954	Elizabethan Express	Narrator	Joint Narrator, with Howard Marion Crawford.
1955	Simon and Laura	Adrian Lee	
1958	The Duke Wore Jeans	King of Ritallia	
1960	Inn for Trouble	Harold Gaskin	
1961	Frederic Chopin	Unknown	short film
1961	The Shadow of the Cat	Inspector Rowles	
1963	Master Spy	Paul Skelton	
1963	Tomorrow at Ten	Assistant Commissioner Bewley	
1964	A Jolly Bad Fellow	Epicene	
1964	Clash By Night	Ronald Grey-Simmons	

== References and sources ==
=== Sources ===
- Herbert, Ian, ed. (1977). Who's Who in the Theatre (sixteenth ed.). London and Detroit: Pitman Publishing and Gale Research. ISBN 978-0-273-00163-8.
