= Lady Behave (musical) =

1941 musical

- Written by: Stanley Lupino
- Music by: Edward Horan
- Original language: English
- Genre: Musical

Premiere
- Date premiered: 1941
- Place premiered: His Majesty's Theatre, London

Lady Behave is a 1941 British stage musical written by Stanley Lupino with music by Edward Horan. In the original West End production at His Majesty's Theatre, Lupino starred alongside Sally Gray who had appeared with him in a number of films. Pat Kirkwood, Judy Kelly, Hartley Power and Judy Campbell also featured in other roles during its run. It is set in Hollywood where a stuntman can't get his girlfriend to marry him until she has made a success in films.

By some accounts it was the first new musical staged in London since the outbreak of the Second World War. It was a popular success. As he grew increasingly ill, Lupino had to step down from his role and was replaced by Bobby Howes.

In 1947 it was adapted for the 1947 Swedish musical film Don't Give Up.

== Bibliography ==
- Donati, William. Ida Lupino: A Biography. University Press of Kentucky, 2013.
- Wearing, J.P. The London Stage 1940-1949: A Calendar of Productions, Performers, and Personnel. Rowman & Littlefield, 2014.
