= Sewell Collins =

American playwright and artist (1876–1934)

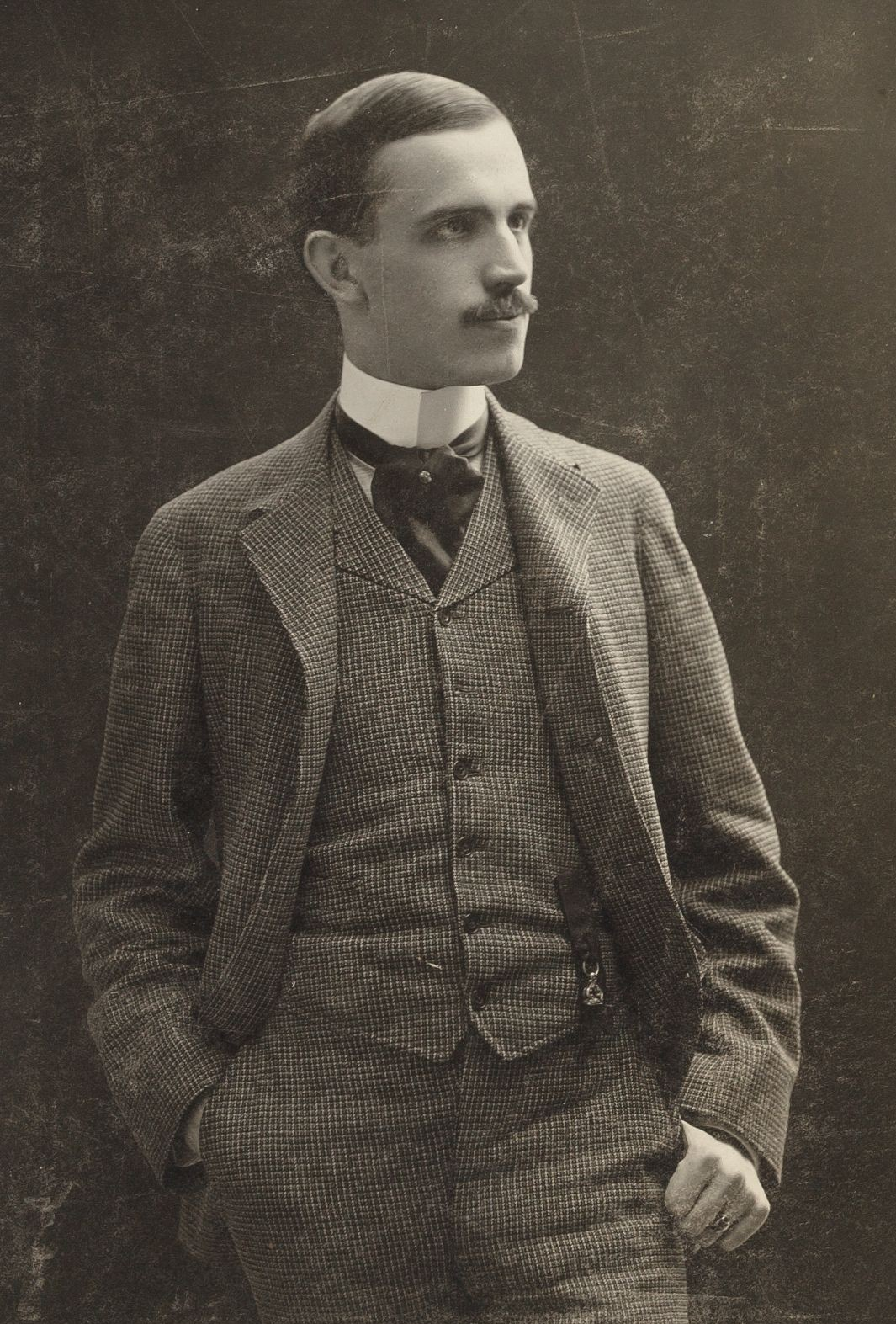
Sewell Collins

Sewell Thomas Collins Jr. (September 1, 1876 – February 15, 1934) was an American dramatist, producer, and illustrator.

== Biography ==
Collins was born in Denver, Colorado, to Sewell Thomas Collins, a banker, and Edith (Hughes) Collins. He attended the University of Notre Dame, Indiana, then Shattuck Military School, Minnesota, from which he graduated in 1893. Afterwards he was engaged as draughtsman in different positions in Chicago, and began studying at the Chicago Art Institute. During this time he was engaged during the day as a clerk, subsequently going with the Chicago Daily News as a reporter and cartoonist. He joined the staff of the Chicago Tribune in 1893, remaining with that paper for four years as a cartoonist, specializing in theatrical work. His work attracted the attention of William Randolph Hearst, who engaged him to come to New York, joining the staff of the Evening Journal. He remained in this position for one year, after which he became a freelance doing theatrical posters and general magazine work, with work appearing in periodicals such as Life and Collier's Weekly. He wrote several one-act sketches, including Awake at the Switch, Thirty Dollars, The Blue Danube, Fine Feathers, The Father, and Somebody. His play Miss Patsy, produced by Henry W. Savage and starring Gertrude Quinlan, opened on Broadway in 1910. The same year, he went to London to write, produce, and paint. He made portraits of many prominent actors and actresses from Europe and America.

Collins wrote several plays which were later adapted for film, including At 9:45 (1919) which was filmed as Nine Forty-Five (1934) and starred Binnie Barnes and Donald Calthrop. In his play G.H.Q. Love (1920), Collins was one of the first playwrights to depict prostitutes without judgment, depicting women who turned to that trade, according to theatre historian Sos Eltis, "as social deprivation and economic necessity." Later in life he began directing films, including The Night Porter (1930) and Bracelets (1931). His wife was the Scottish-born actress Margaret Moffat. He died aged 57 at his home in London on February 15, 1934.

Select illustrations

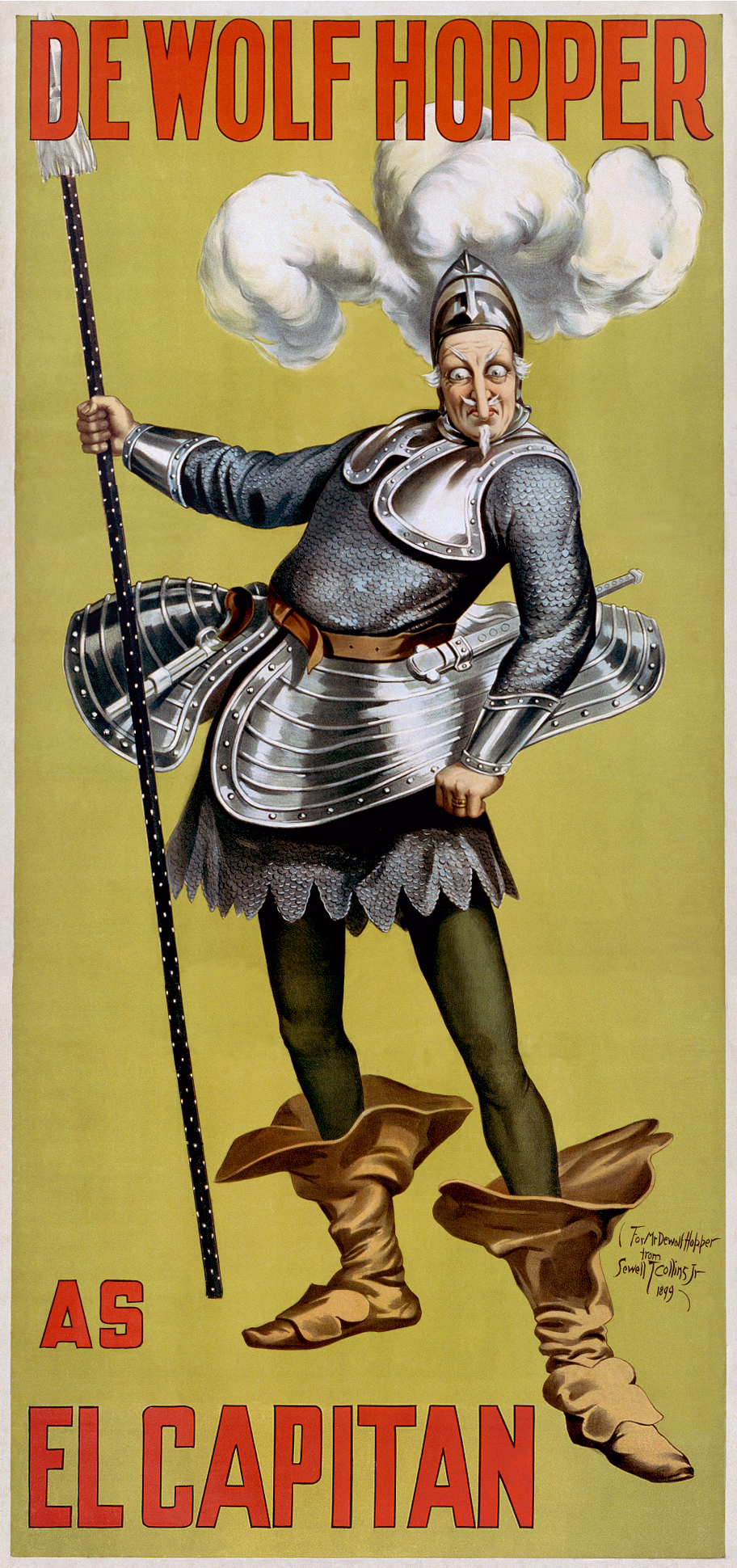
Poster for El Capitan (1896)

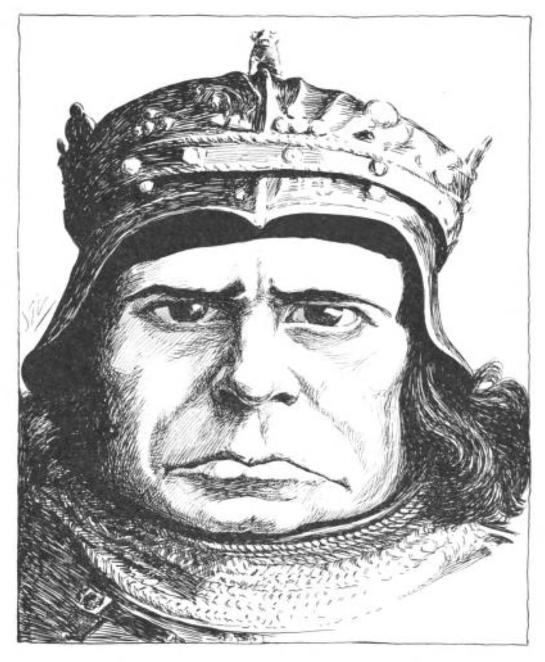
Caricature of Richard Mansfield in Richard III

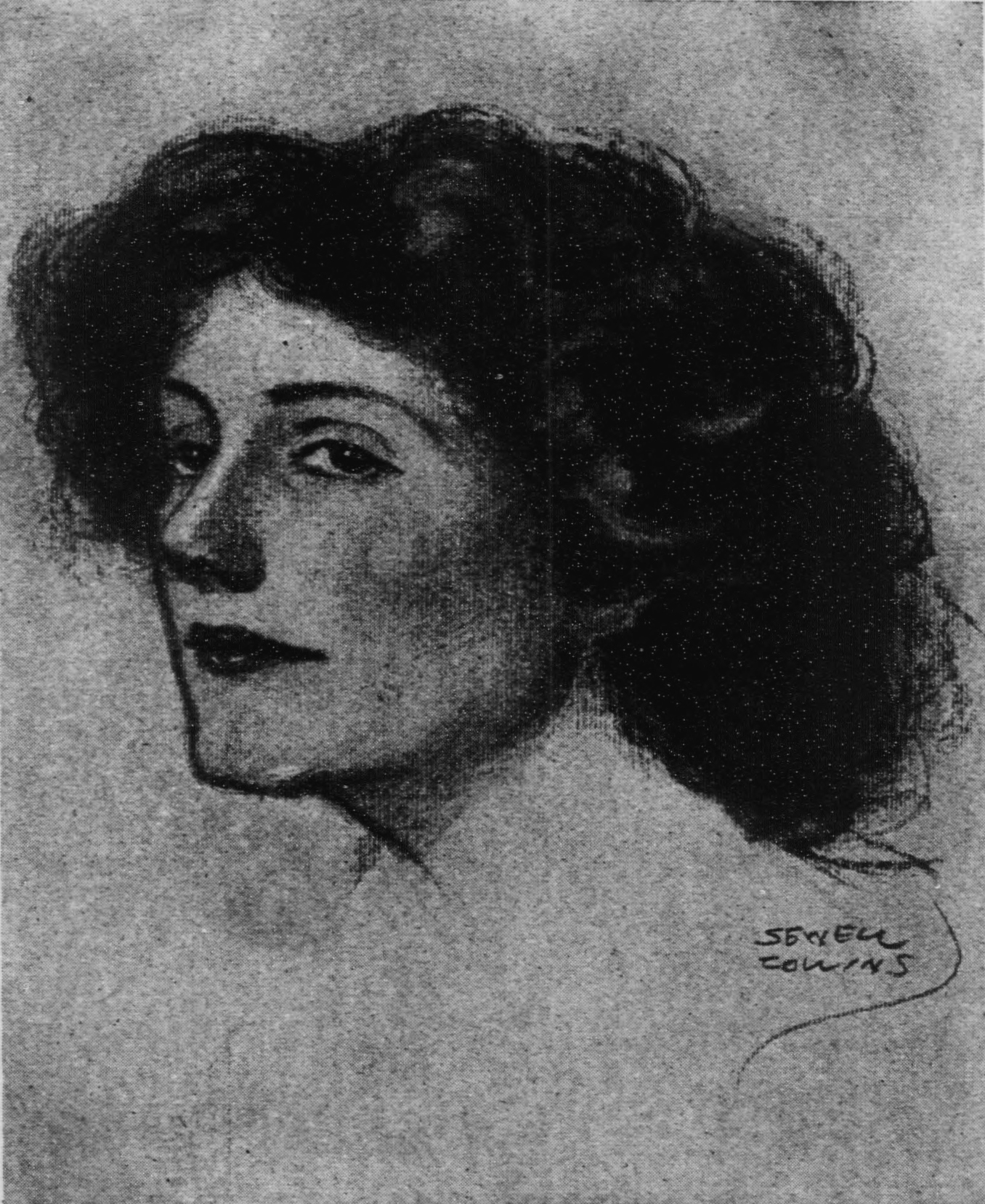
Margaret Moffat, Collins' wife, as sketched in 1909

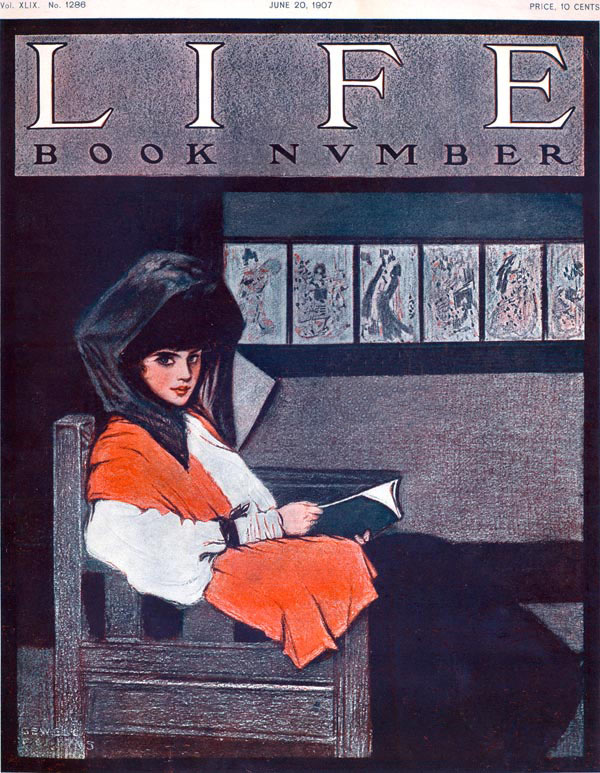
Life cover, June 20 1907
