= Albert Harris (composer) =

- Born: February 13, 1916; London, England, United Kingdom
- Died: February 14, 2005 (aged 89) Auckland, New Zealand
- Genres: film music
- Occupations: Composer, arranger

Albert Harris (13 February 1916 – 14 February 2005) was an English musician who worked most of his life in Hollywood as an orchestrator, arranger and composer for several of the big film studios and for such pop icons as Barbra Streisand, Roberta Flack and Cher.

Harris was born in London and studied piano from age 6 and was also a self-taught guitarist; his knowledge of this instrument enabled him in later years to compose pieces specifically for guitar (his Variations and Fugue on a Theme by Handel was recorded by Andrés Segovia). During the mid-1930s he began to make a name for himself as a session musician in London where he featured on many recordings, most notably as session guitarist with the Lew Stone band, his delicate but swinging improvisations enhancing many of Stones records during the 1934–35 period. He came to New York in 1938 at which time he started playing piano in big bands across the U.S., after which he began studying at New York University's College of Music where he earned a doctorate in music in 1944. Before earning his doctorate he moved to Los Angeles in 1942. Albert Harris studied composition with Mary Carr Moore and Eugen Zador in Los Angeles, and conducting with Richard Lert. He is a recipient of several awards for choral pieces, songs, and an octet for french horn from the Los Angeles Horn Club. Albert Harris served as professor of orchestration at UCLA. He was Assistant Musical Director for NBC from 1946 to 1949.

In 1959, conductor Frank deVol recorded an album of Harris's compositions, Bacchanal, which was 15 pieces, each named for a Greek god.

"Music Service Incorporated" (MSI) was formed by Harris and two colleagues (one of whom was Nelson Riddle) and was responsible for the music for four TV Shows: "Mary Tyler Moore – Dick Van Dyke Show," "Ray Bolger Show," "Danny Thomas Show," and "Andy Griffith Show."

He was music director for Barbra Streisand on the TV special "Barbra and Other Instruments," music orchestrator and arranger for Cher’s album "Bittersweet Moonlight" and was music arranger for Roberta Flack for appearances in Hollywood. Harris was the composer and conductor for Quinn Martin Productions, specifically "Cannon", "Barnaby Jones", "Streets of San Francisco" and "FBI." Over a period of 30 years, Mr. Harris was employed by all the major film studios as an orchestrator and composer.

A popular teacher and lecturer in Los Angeles, he was invited to speak at the Santa Barbara Academy of the West by Darius Milhaud. While he was president of the American Society of Music Arrangers (a post he held from 1989 to 1991), he co-lectured at a composer's workshop with Henry Mancini.

Albert Harris was a member of Composers and Lyricists Guild of America, on the board of directors of the American Society of Music Arrangers. He won the National Composer's Award for his "Concerto de California" scored for guitar and string quartet. Among those nominating Harris was Aaron Copland with whom Harris shares a harmonic language that, in the words of Ned Rorem, "sounds like the great outdoors". Harris retired from film and television work in 1990.

He married Diane Smith, from New Zealand, in California in 1986, and the couple retired to New Zealand in 1992. He died in Auckland. He is survived by his wife Diane Harris and his sister Bette Friedman.

== Selected filmography ==
- Don't Give Up (1947)
- 1955 Kiss Me Deadly
- 1958 Showdown at Boot Hill, aka Shadow of Boot Hill
- 1958 Queen of Outer Space, aka Queen of the Universe
- 1960 Saiyu-ki, aka Alakazam the Great (USA), aka The Enchanted Monkey, aka The Magic Land of Alakazam (USA)
- 1961 Master of the World
- 1963 The Raven
- 1965 Dr. Goldfoot and the Bikini Machine
- 1966 The Ghost in the Invisible Bikini
- 1970 Dirty Dingus Magee
- 1974-75 Cannon TV series, "Man in the Middle", "Voice from the Grave"
- 1979 The Curse of Dracula TV series
