= The Limping Man (1953 film) =

British drama by Cy Endfield

- Theatrical release poster
- Directed by: Cy Endfield
- Written by: Ian Stuart Black; Reginald Long
- Based on: Death on the Tideway by Anthony Verney
- Produced by: Donald Ginsberg
- Starring: Lloyd Bridges; Moira Lister; Leslie Phillips; Alan Wheatley
- Cinematography: Jonah Jones
- Edited by: Stanley Willis
- Music by: Arthur Wilkinson
- Production company: Banner Films
- Distributed by: Eros Films
- Release date: 30 November 1953
- Running time: 76 minutes
- Country: United Kingdom
- Language: English

The Limping Man is a 1953 British second feature ('B') film noir directed by Cy Endfield and starring Lloyd Bridges, Moira Lister and Leslie Phillips. The film was made at Merton Park Studios and was written by Ian Stuart Black and Reginald Long based on Anthony Verney's novel Death on the Tideway. Endfield directed it under the pseudonym Charles de Lautour due to his blacklisting in Hollywood. Location shooting took place around London including The Mayflower pub in Rotherhithe.

== Plot ==
American former soldier Frank Prior arrives in London to visit a wartime girlfriend, whom he has not seen in six years. His plane landing at the airport coincides with a fellow passenger being killed by a sniper.

Scotland Yard Inspector Braddock and detective Cameron are assigned to investigate. The dead man is carrying forged documents addressed to Kendall Brown (whom he is thus identified as), and a photograph that leads them to Pauline French, an actress.

Pauline is the woman Frank has come to see. She also happens to be an expert marksman with a rifle. After they kiss, Pauline tells Frank that she had tried unsuccessfully to notify him to delay his visit.

An autographed picture of another actress, Helene Castle, is found in Kendall Brown's flat. The detectives learn that Helene is the victim's ex-wife. In the meantime, Frank spends a few hours with Pauline on her boat. When they later go to a pub, a limping man seems to menace and unnerve Pauline, who runs away.

Pauline confesses to Frank that she once let Kendall Brown use her boat for a smuggling operation. He began blackmailing her with letters she wrote, which Helene now possesses. At the theatre, the limping man turns out to be George, the stage manager. But to everyone's shock, the late Kendall Brown turns up very much alive. The victim on the plane was a man bringing documents to Brown who saw his own apparent death as convenient.

After knocking the limping man unconscious, Kendall Brown ends up in a fistfight with Frank in the theatre's balcony. Brown and Frank fall over the railing, but as he falls, Frank jars awake and finds himself back on the plane, having dreamed the entire adventure. Brown is revealed to be one of Frank's fellow passengers, Castle the flight attendant, and Braddock and Cameron the pilots. Confused but relieved, Frank exits the plane and meets his girlfriend, Pauline French.

== Cast ==
- Lloyd Bridges as Frank Prior
- Moira Lister as Pauline French
- Alan Wheatley as Inspector Braddock
- Leslie Phillips as Detective Cameron
- Hélène Cordet as Helene Castle, magician's assistant
- Bruce Beeby as Kendall Brown
- André van Gyseghem as George, stage doorman
- Tom Gill as George the Stage Manager
- Lionel Blair as Tommy the dancer
- Robert Harbin as Harper LeStrade, magician
- Charles Bottrill as Xylophonist
- Rachel Roberts as barmaid
- Verne Morgan as Stone
- Raymond Rollett as Jonas
- Irissa Cooper as Maid
- Maxwell Gardner as airport official
- Olive Lucius as T.V. hostess
- Stephen Boyd as airport traveller
- Marjorie Hume as landlady
- Jean Marsh as landlady's daughter
- Max and Louise Boisot as children

== Reception ==
The Monthly Film Bulletin wrote: "Apart from the improbabilities – accounted for by the fact that the film is a dream – this thriller is sufficiently full of mystery to hold the attention for most of its length. Containing the usual mixture of comedy, romance, songs and excitement, it is greatly strengthened by the performances of Alan Wheatley and Leslie Phillips as the detectives. Lloyd Bridges tends to under-play the legendary toughness of Americans in such circumstances."

Kine Weekly wrote: "Romantic crime melodrama unfolded against a bizarre London kaleidoscope. Its story, which is about a young American who gets involved in blackmail and murder while visiting an old flame in England, ends in a dream, but the device disarms at the cost of conviction and realism. Its extravagant surface action can, however, be depended upon to intrigue, if not thrill, the nine-pennies, until hoax explodes."

In British Sound Films: The Studio Years 1928–1959 David Quinlan rated the film as "average", writing: "Competent thriller spoiled by terrible ending."

Leslie Halliwell said: "Initially intriguing thriller which gives up the ghost and tacks on a dream ending."
