= Never Trouble Trouble =

1931 film

- Directed by: Lupino Lane
- Written by: George Dewhurst; Lauri Wylie
- Produced by: Lupino Lane
- Starring: Lupino Lane; Renee Clama; Jack Hobbs; Wallace Lupino
- Production company: Lupino Lane Productions
- Distributed by: Producers Distributing Corporation
- Release date: 10 May 1931
- Running time: 75 minutes
- Country: United Kingdom
- Language: English

Never Trouble Trouble is a 1931 British comedy film directed by Lupino Lane and starring Lane, Renee Clama and Jack Hobbs. It was written by Lane, Renee Clama, Jack Hobbs and Wallace Lupino, and was shot at the Cricklewood Studios in London.

== Synopsis ==
An artist, despairing of life, arranges to have himself assassinated only to discover that he has inherited a large sum of money.

== Cast ==
- Lupino Lane as Olvier Crawford
- Renee Clama as Pam Tweet
- Jack Hobbs as Jimmie Dawson
- Wallace Lupino as Mr. Tweet
- Iris Ashley as Gloria Baxter
- Dennis Hoey as stranger
- Wally Patch as Bill Hainton
- Lola Hunt as Mrs. Hainton
- Barry Lupino as Tompkins
- George Dewhurst as Inspector Stevens
- Syd Crossley as minor role
- Merle Oberon as minor role
- Tom Shale as minor role

== Reception ==
Film Weekly wrote: "Lupino Lane's first personally directed picture cannot be called more than moderate. It has a slight, frankly impossible, story, but that would not matter if it contained comedy that was really funny. As it is, the film is only comic in spots. Too often it misses the laughs through over-emphasis and poor handling. Lupino can be very funny, but he needs a director to handle him and material to work with, Here he lacks both. The film fails beonuse he has tried to do two jobs, one of which is unfamiliar to him."

Kine Weekly wrote: "Quota comedy, which may get over on the star's name and amusing personality, but has little else to recommend it. It has, however, possibilities if drastically condensed and re-edited as the central farcical idea is a good one. ... Lupino Lane works hard and puts up an amusing show, but is handicapped by the unimaginative direction. Whenever given the opportunity, he scores the laughs, but the opportunity comes all too seldom."

The Daily Film Renter wrote: "Much of it in knockabout strain, but farcical story plus continuous gagging and smart comedy work of the lead should keep popular audiences in continuous laughter. One of those films which is unmistakably indicated for mass entertainment, and safe booking. This picture is likely to be popular enough wherever pure knockabout and nonsense is enjoyed. The number of times Lupino Lane makes his famous 'falls' in the course of it is amazing but he does them so cleverly that none will criticise him for relying so often on this type of acrobatics. His facial expressions will also tickle the public's fancy.."
