= In a Lotus Garden =

1931 film directed by Fred Paul

- Directed by: Fred Paul
- Written by: Patrick K. Heale
- Produced by: Patrick K. Heale
- Starring: Roy Galloway; Jocelyn Yeo; H. Agar Lyons
- Music by: Chris Langdon
- Production company: Patrick K. Heale Productions
- Distributed by: Metro-Goldwyn-Mayer
- Release date: 1931
- Running time: 47 minutes
- Country: United Kingdom
- Language: English

In a Lotus Garden is a 1931 British musical film directed by Fred Paul and starring Roy Galloway, Jocelyn Yeo and H. Agar Lyons. It was made at Isleworth Studios as a quota quickie. The film's sets were designed by Norman G. Arnold.

== Cast ==
- Roy Galloway as Lieutenant Dick Waring
- Jocelyn Yeo as Margaret Leyland
- H. Agar Lyons as Mandarin
- Rita Cave as Son Tu
- Jack Barnes as Cher Sang

== Bibliography ==
- Chibnall, Steve. Quota Quickies: The Birth of the British 'B' Film. British Film Institute, 2007.
- Low, Rachael. Filmmaking in 1930s Britain. George Allen & Unwin, 1985.
- Wood, Linda. British Films, 1927-1939. British Film Institute, 1986.
