= The Night Porter (1930 film) =

1930 film

- Theatrical release poster
- Directed by: Sewell Collins
- Written by: Fred Rome (sketch); Harry Wall (writer) (sketch); Ralph Gilbert Bettison; L'Estrange Fawcett; Sewell Collins
- Produced by: L'Estrange Fawcett
- Starring: Donald Calthrop; Trilby Clark; Gerald Rawlinson; Barbara Gott
- Cinematography: Percy Strong
- Edited by: David Lean
- Production company: Gaumont British Picture Corporation
- Distributed by: Ideal Films
- Release date: March 1930
- Running time: 55 minutes
- Country: United Kingdom
- Language: English

The Night Porter is a 1930 British comedy film directed by Sewell Collins and starring Donald Calthrop, Trilby Clark and Gerald Rawlinson. It was produced as a quota quickie for release as a second feature. It was based on a popular music hall sketch by Fred Rome and Harry Wall depicting a honeymooning couple and the hotel night porter they encounter.

== Plot summary ==
George, the inebriate night porter at the Hotel Splendide, develops a series of increasingly outlandish suspicions about Billy and Percy, two guests who have arrived separately yet claim to be a married couple and demand to share a room together, and he believes they are jewel thieves.

== Cast ==
- Donald Calthrop as George, the night porter
- Trilby Clark as Billy Bardolph, the wife
- Gerald Rawlinson as Percy Pink, the husband
- Barbara Gott as Mrs Ramsbotham
- Tom Shale as Jim, the day porter
- Anna Ludmilla

== Production ==
The film was made by Gaumont British Picture Corporation, an affiliate of Gainsborough Pictures, at the Lime Grove Studios with sets designed by Andrew Mazzei.

== Reception ==
Kine Weekly wrote: "The music-hall sketch has been slightly embellished in order to make this into a feature, and this results in it becoming a little tedious at times. It must be said, however, that in the circumstances Donald Calthrop does extraordinarily well and is sufficiently good to make the picture a safe comedy booking."
