= Harry Agar Lyons =

Irish actor (1878–1944)

Harry Agar Lyons (1 April 1878 – 1944) was an Irish-born British actor. He was born in Cork, Ireland in 1878 and died in Wandsworth, London, England in 1944 at age 72.

Lyons is best known for playing Fu Manchu in a series of fifteen silent films collectively called The Mystery of Dr. Fu Manchu, all filmed in 1923, followed by a 1924 series of eight additional Fu Manchu films under the title The Further Mysteries of Dr. Fu Manchu. Lyons starred in the title role of all 23 movies (which ran about 20 –25 minutes each in length), all of which featured Fu's ongoing battle with his two British nemeses, Sir Nayland Smith (played by Fred Paul) and his assistant Dr. Petrie. Both series were produced by Oswald Stoll (see List of Stoll Pictures films), who had earlier produced a 1920 film version of Sax Rohmer's 1915 "Yellow Peril" novel, The Yellow Claw. In spite of the many films in which Lyons played an Oriental character, the obviously British actor "put forth little effort to make himself seem anything other than Caucasian".

He later also starred as Dr. Sin Fang, another Asian character, in a low-budget 1928 six-picture film series produced by Pioneer Productions. The Sin Fang films were produced and directed by Fred Paul (who also co-starred in them as the regularly appearing police lieutenant John Byrne) and were written by Patrick K. Heale. The Sin Fang films co-starred Evelyn Arden as Byrne's girlfriend Betty and Wally Patch as Byrne's sidekick Bill Riggers. Fred Paul (who had also directed a number of the earlier Fu Manchu films) co-produced the 6 Sin Fang films with A. M. Brooks, and created the Sin Fang character to be as similar to Fu Manchu as he could possibly be, without being sued by Sax Rohmer for copyright infringement. Of the six Sin Fang films, only the fifth one (The Torture Cage) still exists.

Lyons' last two films, the cheaply-made 1937 Dr. Sin Fang sound feature and the 1938 Chinatown Nights, also both featured the Dr. Sin Fang character, but those were produced by Victory Films and were not part of the 1928 silent film series.

== The 1923 "Mystery of Dr. Fu Manchu" film series ==
1. The Scented Envelopes (a lost film)
2. The West Case
3. The Clue of the Pigtail
4. The Call of Siva
5. The Miracle
6. The Fungi Cellars
7. The Knocking on the Door
8. The Cry of the Nighthawk
9. Aaron's Rod (only a partial print exists)
10. The Fiery Hand
11. The Man With the Limp
12. The Queen of Hearts
13. The Silver Buddha
14. The Sacred Order
15. Shrine of the Seven Lamps

== The 1924 "Further Mysteries of Dr. Fu Manchu" film series ==
1. The Midnight Summons
2. The Coughing Horror
3. Cragmire Tower
4. The Green Mist
5. The Cafe L'Egypte
6. The Golden Pomegranates
7. Karanmaneh
8. Greywater Park

== The 1928 "Dr. Sin Fang Dramas" film series ==
1. The Scarred Face
2. The Zone of Death
3. The Light on the Wall
4. The Living Death
5. The Torture Cage (the only surviving film in the Sin Fang series)
6. Under the Tide

=== See also ===
Dr. Sin Fang (1937) and Chinatown Nights (1938), two later sound films that also both featured the Dr. Sin Fang character

== Selected filmography ==
- Little Lord Fauntleroy (1914)
- The World, the Flesh and the Devil (1914)
- The Chance of a Lifetime (1916)
- Diana and Destiny (1916)
- A Man the Army Made (1917)
- The Happy Warrior (1917)
- The Knave of Hearts (1919)
- The Man Who Forgot (1919)
- The Power of Right (1919)
- The Iron Stair (1920)
- Mary Latimer, Nun (1920)
- Frailty (1921)
- The River of Stars (1921)
- Melody of Death (1922)
- The Romany (1923)
- One Arabian Night (1923)
- Slaves of Destiny (1924)
- The Prehistoric Man (1924)
- Henry, King of Navarre (1924)
- The Thoroughbred (1928)
- In a Lotus Garden (1931) Lyons plays a Chinese mandarin in this British musical
- Dr. Sin Fang (1937) featured the character Dr. Sin Fang
- Chinatown Nights (1938) featured the character Dr. Sin Fang
