= Just William (film) =

- Feature on the film from The Daily Film Renter (6 June 1939)
- Directed by: Graham Cutts
- Written by: Graham Cutts; Doreen Montgomery; Ireland Wood
- Based on: Books by Richmal Crompton
- Produced by: Walter C. Mycroft
- Starring: Richard Lupino; Fred Emney
- Cinematography: Walter J. Harvey
- Edited by: Edward B. Jarvis
- Distributed by: Pathé Pictures International
- Release date: 20 July 1940
- Running time: 72 minutes
- Country: United Kingdom
- Language: English
- Budget: £25,962

Just William is a 1940 British comedy film directed by Graham Cutts and starring Richard Lupino, Fred Emney and Basil Radford. It was written by Cutts, Doreen Montgomery and Ireland Wood based on the Just William series of books by Richmal Crompton.

== Plot ==
A rascally child recruits his friends as assistants to help his father get elected to the city council. Sadly, the children accidentally help two jewel thieves to escape. They feel sorry about this, and to redeem themselves, the kids begin investigating a rival candidate's conspiracy. Their involvement causes the boy's father to win the election.

== Cast ==
- Richard Lupino as William Brown
- Fred Emney as Mr Brown
- Basil Radford as Mr Sidway
- Amy Veness as Mrs Bott
- Iris Hoey as Mrs Brown
- Roddy McDowall as Ginger
- Norman Robinson as Douglas
- Peter Miles as Henry
- David Tree as Marmaduke Bott
- Jenny Laird as Ethel Brown
- Simon Lack as Robert Brown

== Reception ==
The Monthly Film Bulletin wrote: "Competently produced with a well-chosen cast, its broad humour and the cheery personality of Dicky Lupino as William should make it popular entertainment, especially with readers of the books. Fred Emney shoulders a fair share of the entertainment and the rest of the cast give adequate support."

Kine Weekly wrote: "Workmanlike translation to screen of popular Richmal Crompton story and boy character beloved by thousands, who should have no complaints about Dicky Lupino's characterisation in title-role. Slender story threading together series of juvenile adventures and domestic incident has been developed on lines calculated to please the masses, and this, with huge ready-made public, ensure certain success for the film as popular entertainment. "
