= Nine Forty-Five =

1934 film

- Scene from the film from a review in Picture Show (8 September 1934)
- Directed by: George King
- Written by: Sewell Collins (play); Owen Davis (play); Brock Williams
- Produced by: Irving Asher
- Starring: Binnie Barnes; Donald Calthrop; Violet Farebrother
- Cinematography: Basil Emmott
- Production company: Warner Brothers
- Distributed by: Warner Brothers
- Release date: 3 September 1934
- Running time: 59 minutes
- Country: United Kingdom
- Language: English

Nine Forty-Five (also known as 9.45) is a 1934 British quota quickie crime film directed by George King and starring Binnie Barnes, Donald Calthrop and Violet Farebrother. It was written by Brock Williams based on the 1919 play At 9:45 by Sewell Collins and Owen Davis, and made at Teddington Studios by the British subsidiary of Warner Brothers.

== Preservation status ==
The BFI National Archive holds a collection of stills but no film or video materials.

== Cast ==
- Binnie Barnes as Ruth Jordan
- Donald Calthrop as Dr. Venables
- Violet Farebrother as Mrs. Randall
- Malcolm Tod as James Everett
- James Finlayson as P.C. Doyle
- George Merritt as Inspector Dickson
- Ellis Irving as Turner
- Cecil Parker as Robert Clayton
- Janice Adair as Molly Clayton
- Margaret Yarde as Margaret Clancy
- René Ray as Mary Doane

== Reception ==
Kine Weekly wrote: "The performances of Donald Calthrop as amateur detective and of an unnamed actress as a cook are the most interesting points about a distinctly commonplace murder mystery. ... Except for allowing a torrent of dialogue, including rather too much back-chat between the blustering, dense inspector and his P.C. assistant, George King has directed successfully. He keeps the complicated threads of the plot clear, emphasises action where possible, and gives away no secrets till the finish. The fault of the plot lies in the stereotyped characters and the consistency with which every murder suspect lies to save someone else. It is also difficult to bélieve in the extreme gullibility of the inspector. The profuse dialogue is mostly lively in tone."

The Daily Film Renter wrote: "Unpretentious effort, leaving many loose ends, but interesting because of good performances, notably from Donald Calthrop and Margaret Yarde, and story development. Drama and comedy effectively mixed, but many situations open to criticism. Adequate second feature for popular provincial halls."

Picturegoer wrote: "That fine character actor Donald Calthrop scores in another wise commonplace murder mystery. This time he is on the side of the angels as an amateur detective who solves the murder of a Mr. Randall, after suspicion has fallen on a number of people. Binnie Barnes has few opportunities as one of the suspects. The characters and situations are stereotyped, and there is a preponderance of dialogue."

Picture Show wrote: "There are the usual comedy police, who bully the doctor who eventually clears up the mystery. The doctor is finely played by Donald Calthrop, excellently supported by Margaret Yarde."
