= Tom Shale =

British actor (1864–1953)

- Tom Shale, George Robey and Barry Lupino in Jack and the Beanstalk c.1920
- Born: Thomas Augustine Shale; 10 September 1864; Bilston, Staffordshire, England
- Died: 24 June 1953 (aged 88); Brighton, Sussex, England
- Occupations: Film actor, comedian

Thomas Augustine Shale (10 September 1864 – 24 June 1953) was a British comic actor who appeared in vaudeville, theatre, pantomime and films during the late 19th and early 20th centuries.

Making his first professional appearance in 1885, he was a regular in pantomime, playing 'Buttons' in Cinderella and King Stoneybrokish in Jack and the Beanstalk with George Robey and Barry Lupino. He regularly toured in productions in Great Britain and the United States.

His films included The Night Porter (1930), Never Trouble Trouble (1931) and The Good Companions (1933).

His brother Edward Shale (1861–1926) was a London-based stage manager for over 20 years.
