= The Prehistoric Man =

1924 film

- Directed by: A. E. Coleby
- Written by: George Robey; Sinclair Hill
- Starring: George Robey; Marie Blanche; H. Agar Lyons
- Production company: Stoll Pictures
- Distributed by: Stoll Pictures
- Release date: March 1924
- Country: United Kingdom
- Languages: Silent; English intertitles

The Prehistoric Man is a 1924 British silent comedy film directed by A. E. Coleby and starring George Robey, Marie Blanche and H. Agar Lyons.

== Cast ==
- George Robey as He-of-the Beetle Brow
- Marie Blanche as She-of-the Permanent-Wave
- H. Agar Lyons as He-of-the-Clutching-Hand
- W. G. Saunders as He-of-the-Knotty-Joints
- Johnny Butt as He-of-the-Cedar-Mop
- Elsie Marriott-Watson as She-of-the-Tireless-Tongue
- Laurie Leslie as He-of-the-Matted-Beaver

== Bibliography ==
- Goble, Alan. The Complete Index to Literary Sources in Film. Walter de Gruyter, 1999.
- Low, Rachael. The History of the British Film 1918-1929. George Allen & Unwin, 1971.
