= Lu Ann Meredith =

American film actress (1913–1998)

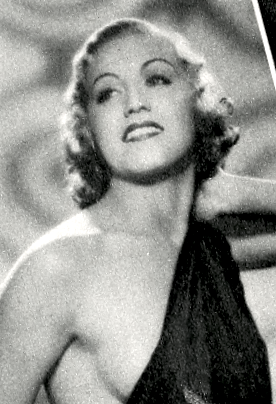
- Meredith in 1934
- Born: July 7, 1913; Dallas, Texas, U.S.
- Died: November 12, 1998 (aged 85); Lancaster, California, U.S.
- Other name: Lu Anne Meredith
- Occupation: Actress
- Years active: 1934-1937

Lu Ann Meredith (July 7, 1913—November 12, 1998) was an American film actress. Picked as one of the WAMPAS Baby Stars in 1934, her career did not flourish unlike a number of other awardees such as Jean Arthur and Ginger Rogers. In 1935, she had a romance with David Lean, who discussed marriage with her mother Cheerio Meredith. She made a few appearances in British films, but by 1937 her film career had declined. She appeared in a total of nine films between 1934 and 1939 before retiring from acting.

== Filmography ==
- Young and Beautiful (1934)
- Whirlpool (1934)
- Night Life of the Gods (1936)
- Ball at Savoy (1936)
- Sporting Love (1937)
- Sing as You Swing (1937)

== Bibliography ==
- Gregory William Mank. Women in Horror Films, 1930s. McFarland, 2005.
