= Garrison Follies =

1940 British film by Maclean Rogers

- Feature on the film in The Daily Film Renter (4 July 1940)
- Directed by: Maclean Rogers
- Written by: Kathleen Butler; H.F. Maltby; Maclean Rogers
- Produced by: Ernest Gartside; Hugh Perceval
- Starring: Barry Lupino; Nancy O'Neil; H.F. Maltby
- Cinematography: Geoffrey Faithfull
- Music by: Percival Mackey
- Production company: Signet Films
- Distributed by: Butcher's Film Service
- Release date: 19 October 1940
- Running time: 64 minutes
- Country: United Kingdom
- Language: English

Garrison Follies is a 1940 British comedy musical revue film directed by Maclean Rogers and starring Barry Lupino, Nancy O'Neil and H.F. Maltby. It was written by Kathleen Butler, Maltby and Rogers.

== Plot ==
Major Hall-Vett, pulled out of retirement, takes over as temporary commandant of the RAF's Rashminster aerodrome and arranges a civilian concert party and "water carnival." Problems arise when he realises there is no water available. His attempts to fix the situation only make matters worse, as he mistakenly summons military tanks instead of water tanks. The various disasters are finally resolved in a cheerful musical conclusion.

== Cast ==
- Barry Lupino as Alf Shufflebottom
- Nancy O'Neil as Sally Richards
- H.F. Maltby as Major Hall-Vett
- John Kevan as Dick Munro
- Hugh Dempster as adjutant
- Gabrielle Brune as Lady Cynthia Clayton
- Neville Brook as Commanding Officer
- Dennis Val Norton as Plummer
- Harry Herbert as himself
- Sylvia Kellaway as herself
- Ann Lenner as herself
- The Six Rose Petals as themselves
- Percival Mackey as himself

== Production ==
Thefilm was produced by the independent Butcher's Film Service and shot at Walton Studios outside London. The film's sets were designed by the art director Holmes Paul.

== Reception ==
The Monthly Film Bulletin wrote: "This is a cheerful, tuneful, light-hearted spectacle guaranteed to cure the worst dose of blues. Everything is delightfully exaggerated, from the apoplectic major to the trumpet player who apparently plumbs in his spare time, while intermixed with their antics are some pleasant variety turns. Barry Lupino is excellent as Alf Shufflebottom, the resourceful plumber; Sally Richards looks charming as the heroine; while H. F. Maltby's dug-out major has to be seen to be believed."

Kine Weekly wrote: "The show is so written that all the gags and situations lead up to a water carnival, and a crazy one at that, but expectation is not fulfilled. There is not even a drop of water. But, although aquatic slapstick is denied, anticipation is responsible for a number of laughs, and there arc many other bright gags. The incidental acts are also versatile and top-line."

Picturegoer wrote: "Main asset is H. F. Maltby as an ex-Indian colonel who insists on taking charge of the show. He gives a good humorous character study. Barry Lupino also scores as Alf, a plumber and between them they pro-vide a quota of laughs."

== Bibliography ==
- Mackenzie, S.P. British War films, 1939-1945. A&C Black, 2001.
- Wright, Adrian. Cheer Up!: British Musical Films 1929-1945. The Boydell Press, 2020.
