= Avengers of the Reef =

- Directed by: Chris McCullugh
- Written by: Anne Brooksbank
- Produced by: Noel Ferrier
- Starring: Simon Drake
- Cinematography: Peter James
- Edited by: Tim Wellburn
- Music by: John Sangster
- Production company: Timon Productions
- Distributed by: Roadshow
- Release date: 21 October 1973
- Running time: 84 mins
- Country: Australia
- Language: English
- Budget: A$100,000
- Box office: A$27,000 (Australia)

Avengers of the Reef is a 1973 Australian children's film directed by Chris McCullugh and starring Simon Drake.

== Cast ==
- Simon Drake as Tim Stewart
- Biu Rarawa as Sai
- Tim Elliot as Kemp
- Noel Ferrier as Updike
- Garry McDonald as Updike's Aide
- Dibs Mather as Bill Stewart
- Lesie as Chieftain
- Judy Morris as Airline Hostess
- Jenny Lee
- Richard Lupino
- Bob Lee
- Eddie Osborne

== Production ==
Taveuni was a setting for Avengers of the Reef.

== Awards ==
Anne Brooksbank won an Australian Writers Guild Award for the screenplay.
