= Hot News (1936 film) =

Hots News
- Directed by: W. P. Kellino
- Written by: Reginald Long; Arthur Rigby
- Produced by: Ian Sutherland
- Starring: Lupino Lane; Phyllis Clare; Wallace Lupino
- Cinematography: Jack Parker
- Production company: St. George's Pictures
- Distributed by: Columbia Pictures
- Release date: March 1936
- Running time: 77 minutes
- Country: United Kingdom
- Language: English

Hots News is a 1936 British comedy film directed by W. P. Kellino and starring Lupino Lane, Phyllis Clare and Wallace Lupino.

It was made as a quota quickie at Cricklewood Studios.

== Synopsis ==
An idiot working as a guest reporter on a newspaper gets entangled with Chicago gangsters.

== Cast ==
- Lupino Lane as Jimmy Selby
- Phyllis Clare as Betty Mason
- Wallace Lupino as Horace Wells
- Barbara Kilner as Princess Ina
- Ben Welden as Slug Wilson
- Glen Raynham as Barbara O'Neill
- Reginald Long as Prince Stephen
- Fred Leslie as Leslie Fredericks
- George Pughe as Slim McGill

== Bibliography ==
- Chibnall, Steve. Quota Quickies: The British of the British 'B' Film. British Film Institute, 2007.
- Low, Rachael. Filmmaking in 1930s Britain. George Allen & Unwin, 1985.
- Wood, Linda. British Films, 1927-1939. British Film Institute, 1986.
