= Barry Lupino =

British actor (1882–1962)

- Tom Shale, George Robey and Barry Lupino in Jack and the Beanstalk c.1920
- Born: George Barry Lupino-Hook; 7 January 1884; Southwark, London, England
- Died: 26 September 1962 (aged 78); Brighton, Sussex, England
- Occupations: Film actor, film producer, comedian
- Years active: 1919–1962

George Barry Lupino-Hook (7 January 1884 – 26 September 1962) was an English comedian and film actor, and a notable Pantomime dame.

He was the brother of the actor and comedian Stanley Lupino, the father of the actress Antoinette Lupino, and the uncle of the actresses Ida and Rita Lupino.

Lupino was married three times, to Gertrude Latchford, Mary Georgina Gordon Anstruther and Doriel M. Phillips.

== Selected filmography ==
- Barry Butts In (1919)
- Never Trouble Trouble (1931)
- Master and Man (1934)
- Sporting Love (1936)
- Bed and Breakfast (1938)
- The Sky's the Limit (1938)
- Garrison Follies (1940)
- What Do We Do Now? (1946)

== See also ==
- Lupino family
