= Lupino Lane =

British actor (1892–1959)

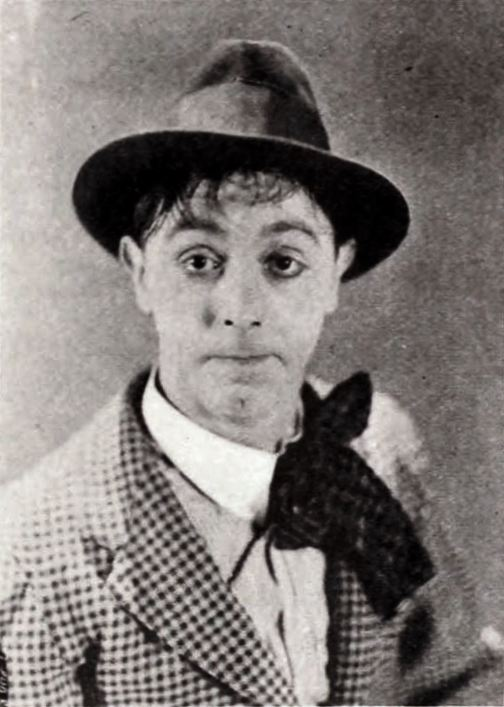
- Lane in 1922
- Born: Henry William George Lupino; 16 June 1892; Hackney, London, England
- Died: 10 November 1959 (aged 67); London, England
- Occupations: Actor; theatre manager; director; producer
- Years active: 1896–1940
- Spouse: Violet Blythe (m. 1917)
- Children: 1
- Relatives: Wallace Lupino (brother); Stanley Lupino (brother); Ida Lupino (cousin) Richard Lupino (nephew)
- Family: Lupino

Henry William George Lupino (16 June 1892 – 10 November 1959), known professionally as Lupino Lane, was an English actor and theatre manager, and a member of the famous theatrical Lupino family, which eventually included his cousin, the screenwriter/director/actress Ida Lupino. Lane began as a child performer, known as "Little Nipper", and went on to appear in a wide range of theatrical, music hall, and film performances.

Lupino Lane is best known in the United Kingdom for playing Bill Snibson in the play and film Me and My Girl, which popularized the song-and-dance routine "The Lambeth Walk". In America he is remembered as an acrobatic star of silent comedy shorts produced between 1925 and 1929. Lane was especially well suited to physical comedy because he was double-jointed, and his limber frame was capable of performing dazzling acrobatics. One of his unique feats had him sitting or reclining on the floor, and suddenly thrusting his legs forward and leaping to his feet (as seen in his 1927 short Hello Sailor).

Lane married actress Violet Blythe on 10 February 1917, and their son was the actor Lauri Lupino Lane (1921–1986). Lane's brothers were the actors Wallace Lupino and Stanley Lupino, and his nephew (Wallace's son) was another actor, Richard Lupino.

== Early life and career ==
Lane was born in Hackney, London, son of Harry Charles Lupino (1867–1925), part of the Hook family who adopted the surname 'Lupino.' His great-aunt Sarah Lane (1822–1899, née Borrow), the director of the Britannia Theatre in Hoxton, did not want her name to die out and prevailed upon young Henry to take the Lane name.

Lane made his first stage appearance at the age of four in a benefit in Birmingham for Vesta Tilley. He made his London début in 1903 as Nipper Lane at the London Pavilion. The Nipper name stuck, and for the rest of his life his friends and family addressed him as Nip.

In 1915, he appeared at the Empire Theatre and played comic roles in theatre and film on both sides of the Atlantic from then on. In 1921, he dived through sixty three stage traps in six minutes while performing in a 1921 pantomime production of Aladdin at the Hippodrome. Lane and his wife Violet Blythe were both in the Broadway production of the musical Afgar, at the Central Theatre, in 1920–21, and he appeared in the Ziegfeld Follies of 1924 at the New Amsterdam Theatre, from June 1924 to March 1925, and subsequently played Ko-Ko in The Mikado on Broadway in 1925, receiving good reviews. In 1929 Lane told a reporter that Ko-Ko was his favorite role.

Lane's silent film career started in 1915, at age 23, in a series of British short films, including the experimental Mr Butterbuns series. As a comedian, he appeared in 40 Hollywood films made in the 1920s. After several shorts and features for Fox in 1922–23, Lane appeared as Rudolph in D. W. Griffith's 1924 feature Isn't Life Wonderful?

== Silent-comedy star ==
Earle Hammons of silent-comedy studio Educational Pictures signed Lupino Lane in 1925. Hammons sent his chief producer Jack White to see Lane on stage: "He was working in New York in The Mikado, Gilbert and Sullivan. I went backstage to see him after the show was over and we got to know each other fairly well," recalled White. Lane starred in a series of short comedies that featured his acrobatic flips and falls. Lane's co-star was usually his brother, Wallace Lupino. Wallace also starred in his own comedies, only three of which are known to survive. (Archivist Ben Model discovered one of them and posted it on YouTube.)

During his first year at Educational, Lane found time to produce and star in The Hollywood Music Box Revue, which enjoyed an unusually long run (by local standards) of 19 weeks. Some of the young ladies featured in the show went on to screen careers, including Lupe Vélez, Nancy Carroll, and Marion Byron.

Roscoe Arbuckle, Charles Lamont, Norman Taurog, and Mark Sandrich were some of Lupino Lane's directors, but in 1928 Lane insisted on directing the films himself. (He received screen credit under the pseudonym "Henry W. George," his given names.) White commented, "[Wallace Lupino] was approachable where Lupino Lane was not. Lane was a very difficult guy to make a movie with, because he disagreed with everything except what came from his head. I thought he was rather arrogant. He went on for a couple years, though [sic]." Lane demonstrated that he knew his business, and his comedies successfully displayed his agility and versatility: in one film he played 27 characters (Only Me, 1929).

Lupino Lane made the transition to talking pictures, his voice being a light, British-accented tenor. He was one of the first of Educational's stars to make talking two-reel comedies; his sound shorts alternated with silent shorts through the end of 1929.

== Musical comedy star in sound films ==
In mid-1929 Hollywood finally realized that Lupino Lane already had musical comedy experience, extremely valuable in the early days of sound. Reporter Scoop Conlon commented, "It never rains but it pours in this game. Here Lupino Lane has been content to star in his own two-reel comedies under the Educational banner for several seasons, when suddenly the Paramount company decides that the diminutive comedian will prove a great asset to their next Maurice Chevalier starring picture, The Love Parade. Just as suddenly the other producers wake up to the fact that they may be passing up a big bet in Lupino, who has long been one of our most popular musical comedy stars. Now comes the news that the Warner Brothers have signed Lupino. He will take his makeup box over to the Warner Brothers studio late this month." While at Warner Bros., Lane made a guest appearance in the studio's musical revue The Show of Shows, and played supporting roles in two feature films, Bride of the Regiment and Golden Dawn (both released 1930).

Educational had already promised exhibitors "eight talking comedies" with Lane, but only four had been completed when Lane's contract ran out. In October 1929 reporter Conlon announced that Lupino Lane was abandoning short subjects for feature films, on the strength of his Paramount and Warner pictures.

On the heels of this report, Lane himself explained his state of affairs to syndicated columnist Dan Thomas: "I have wanted to get out of this two-reel racket for the last three years, but I couldn't because of my contract with Educational. That contract was completed when I finished my last picture, and now I am through. The majority of theater audiences don't even stay to see the comedies. Consequently, no matter how big a man may be in the field of two-reelers, he gets no recognition from the fans because they don't see him. In the old days when Charlie Chaplin and Roscoe Arbuckle were kings of the comedy lots, things were different. Comedies played just as big a part on theater programs as feature productions then. And they were made with that in mind. Today they are merely fillers. I hope to be starred in feature-length musical comedies on the screen, but if I can't do that, I will return to the legitimate stage."

Two months later Lane abandoned Hollywood entirely, leaving Educational, Warner, and Paramount behind. In December 1929 the New York Daily News reported that Lupino Lane "is deserting Hollywood for a six-month engagement at the Hippodrome in London." A subsequent Film Daily report added that Lane was leaving Hollywood for his native England, to form his own production company, which was confirmed in a European dispatch from January 1930: "Lupino Lane, who is now appearing at the Glasgow Alhambra, intends setting up an organisation of his own outside London, to make British comedies, and his immediate plans include four features and twelve two-reel comedies a year. He will probably only appear in two features himself, but will direct the others."

Lane's surprise swan song in America was a Vitaphone short called Evolution of the Dance, released in February 1930 as a two-reel Technicolor special, even though the running time (12 minutes) barely exceeded one reel. This was filmed as a production number for the feature-length Show of Shows revue but removed from the final cut. The short is a pageant of performers offering different styles of dance; Lupino Lane leads a hobo ensemble. Dance directors Larry Ceballos and Jack Haskell were credited in the short, but featured performer Lane was not; Vitaphone waited until Lane had left the country before quietly releasing the out-take—without crediting Lane. Fellow British stage stars Jack Buchanan and Beatrice Lillie also filmed specialty acts for Show of Shows that Warner removed and released separately as Vitaphone shorts.

A little-known postscript to Lupino Lane's career in America: in 1936 Educational's Earle Hammons tried to persuade Lane to return to the screen in two-reel comedies. At this time, star comedian Joe Cook was leaving the studio and Hammons needed a "name" comedian to replace him. Lane gave the offer enough consideration for Hammons to announce it publicly, listing the new season's contract actors "and possibly Lupino Lane", but Lane finally declined and remained in England.

== Career in Europe ==
In the 1930s Lane worked exclusively in Europe, starring in feature films and on the musical-comedy stage. With Sir Oswald Stoll, Lane co-produced Twenty to One, written by L. Arthur Rose and Frank Eyton with music by Billy Mayerl, on the West End. Lane made his first appearance as Bill Snibson in this production, in which Snibson, a racetrack tout, was a big hit. The production ran for a year starting from November 1935 and went on a long British tour afterward.

Me and My Girl, the follow-up show, written by Rose and Douglas Furber with music by Noel Gay, was an even bigger hit. Snibson inherits a country estate and invites his mates from Lambeth to stay with him. It featured a hit song and dance routine from Lane called "The Lambeth Walk", which became popular throughout Europe in the late 1930s. Lane directed and produced the show as well as starring in it for 1,550 performances between 1937 and 1940. It was the first British musical comedy to be televised.

A film version went into production in October 1938. The Me and My Girl film was released by Metro-Goldwyn-Mayer in January 1940 under the title The Lambeth Walk, purely on the popularity of the dance craze. Trade reviewer Pete Harrison cautioned exhibitors that the film was "not for the American masses; the accents are thick, and some of the situations and slang expressions are so British that they will be completely lost on American audiences." Harrison's prediction proved correct: in some American theaters, moviegoers walked out on the picture.

== Later career and death ==
Lane and Jon Pertwee in a 1955 Radio Times advert for the programme "Round the Bend"

Me and My Girl was a vehicle for Lupino Lane, and it made him a rich man. Lane continued to act on stage and on television in England for the rest of his life. In 1946, after it sustained damage during World War II, he purchased the shell of the Gaiety Theatre in London to rescue it from dereliction, intending to produce comedies. He failed to win the financial backing to refurbish it and sold it in 1950. The theatre was demolished in 1956.

On March 25, 1956 Lupino Lane was the subject of This Is Your Life when he was surprised by host Eamonn Andrews at London's BBC Television Theatre. Columnist Bernard Charman reported, "The interesting point came when Eamonn Andrews was reminding him of how Me and My Girl was transformed from a failure to a blazing success. The musical was in fact on the very point of folding when John Watt and Charles Brewer did a live radio broadcast of it from the theatre. From that day it never looked back -- and ran for five years."

Lane also appeared on radio's Desert Island Discs in 1957. The premise of the show had the guest performer "cast away" with a phonograph on a desert island, and selecting eight favorite records he would take with him.

== Memorials ==
Lupino Lane died on November 10, 1959, in London, at age 67 and is buried at Streatham Park Cemetery. His wife, Violet Blythe, died March 17, 1983, aged 93.

To mark the 50th anniversary of his death, the Music Hall Guild of Great Britain and America restored his memorial at Streatham Park Cemetery and held a memorial service at St Paul's, Covent Garden, with a reception at Theatre Royal, Drury Lane.

A commemorative blue plaque was erected in memory of Lupino Lane on June 15, 2014 at his former home 32 Maida Vale, Paddington, by The Music Hall Guild of Great Britain and America.

== Partial filmography ==
All are starring roles unless otherwise indicated:

- A Friendly Husband (1923)
- Maid in Morocco (1925, short)
- Fool's Luck (1926, short)
- His Private Life (1926 short, not to be confused with the 1928 Adolphe Menjou feature of the same name)
- Hello Sailor (1927)
- Drama Deluxe (1927, short)
- Sword Points (1928, short)
- Roaming Romeo (1928, short)
- Fisticuffs (1928, short)
- Be My King (1928, short)
- Only Me (1929, short)
- The Love Parade (1929, supporting role)
- Summer Saps (1929, short)
- Ship Mates (1929, his first sound short)
- Good Night Nurse (1929, silent short)
- Battling Sisters (1929, silent short)
- Buying a Gun (1929, sound short)
- Joy Land (1929, silent short)
- Fire Proof (1929, sound short)
- Purely Circumstantial (1929, sound short, his final for Educational)
- The Show of Shows (1929, guest appearance in feature film)
- Golden Dawn (1930, supporting role)
- Evolution of the Dance (1930 short in Technicolor, final American film)
- The Yellow Mask (1930)
- Never Trouble Trouble (1931)
- No Lady (1931)
- Love Lies (1932, director)
- A Southern Maid (1933, supporting role)
- The Deputy Drummer (1935)
- Trust the Navy (1935)
- Who's Your Father (1935)
- Hot News (1936)
- Me and My Girl (1939, released in America in 1940 as The Lambeth Walk)

== DVD release ==
On December 26, 2012, Alpha Video released Lupino Lane Silent Comedy Collection, Volume 1 on Region 0 DVD-R.
On January 28, 2014, Alpha released Lupino Lane Silent Comedy Collection, Volume 2.
On November 15, 2022, D&D Productions (Dave Glass and Dave Wyatt) released Lupino Lane: Silent Comedian on DVD & Blu-ray.

== See also ==
- Lupino family

== Sources ==
- Lane, Lupino (1946). How To Become A Comedian. London: F. Muller Ltd.
- White, James Dillon (1957). Born to Star: The Lupino Lane Story. London: Heinemann.
- Balducci, Anthony (2012). Eighteen Comedians of Silent Film. Seattle: CreateSpace Independent Publishing Platform. ISBN 978-1479152926.
