= Chinatown Nights (1938 film) =

1938 British film by Toni Frenguelli

- Directed by: Anthony Frenguelli
- Written by: Nigel Byass; Frederick Reynolds
- Story by: Kaye Mason
- Produced by: Nell Emerald
- Starring: Harry Agar Lyons; Anne Grey; Robert Hobbs; Nell Emerald; Arty Ash; George Mozart
- Production company: Victory Films
- Distributed by: Columbia Pictures Corporation
- Release date: March 1938
- Running time: 70 minutes
- Country: United Kingdom

Chinatown Nights is a 1938 British science fiction film directed by Anthony Frenguelli and starring Harry Agar Lyons, Anne Grey and Robert Hobbs. It was written by Nigel Byass and Frederick Reynolds.

Lyons plays the evil Dr. Sin Fang, a character that he had played earlier in a 1928 six-picture film series produced by Pioneer Productions (see the actor's filmography).

== Preservation status ==
The British Film Institute's National Archive holds no ephemera, stills or film or video materials.

== Plot ==
On the eve of her marriage to John Byrne, Sonia Graham is hypnotised and abducted by Boroski, the son of Chinese criminal Sin Fang, who is seeking a formula invented by Sonia's brother. Mrs. Higgins, housekeeper for the Byrnes, discovers the criminals' whereabouts, and together with a policeman they infiltrate their headquarters, but Fang blows up the building. Sonia escapes capture from Boroski and she and John are reunited.

== Cast ==
- Harry Agar Lyons as Doctor Sin Fang
- Anne Grey as Sonia Graham
- Robert Hobbs as John Byrne
- Nell Emerald as Mrs. Higgins
- Arty Ash as Professor Graham
- George Mozart as Bill

== Reception ==
Kine Weekly wrote: "Crude, involved story of abduction and hypnotism with Chinese atmosphere. At least, the mainspring of the villainy and the venue of the plot are represented as having a Chinese origin: but we seldom seem to be out of a rather exotic film studio, and neither the plot nor the characters have any recognisable likeness to reality. ... Anne Grey is the conventional heroine caught in absurd situations: Robert Hobbs, the distraught bridegroom; and Henry Agar Lyons and Edgar Picrce porfray the Chinese villains in preposterous make-up."

The Daily Film Renter wrote: "Disjointed, under-directed, and lacking in production values. ... Quite what one is supposed to do with this disjointed mélange of crude melodrama is a mystery, for not even the most unsophisticated juvenile patron can digest a series of apparently unrelated happenings, put over with an entire lack of conviction. ... The photography is passable, otherwise the picture lacks even the elementary principles of entertainment."
