= The Lambeth Walk (film) =

1939 film by Albert de Courville

- Lobby card
- Directed by: Albert de Courville
- Written by: John Paddy Carstairs (screenplay); Clifford Grey; Robert Edmunds
- Based on: the musical by Noel Gay; Douglas Furber; Louis Arthur Rose
- Produced by: Anthony Havelock-Allan
- Starring: Lupino Lane; Seymour Hicks; Sally Gray
- Cinematography: Francis Carver
- Edited by: Lister Laurance; Richard Best
- Music by: Louis Levy (musical director); Jack Beaver
- Production company: Pinewood Studios
- Distributed by: MGM
- Release date: 3 April 1939 (U.K.)
- Running time: 84 min
- Country: United Kingdom
- Language: English
- Budget: £53,514

The Lambeth Walk (U.S. title: Me and My Girl) is a 1939 British musical comedy film directed by Albert de Courville and starring Lupino Lane, Sally Gray and Seymour Hicks. It was written by John Paddy Carstairs, Clifford Grey and Robert Edmunds, adapted from the 1937 musical Me and My Girl, The film takes its title from the play's best known song, "The Lambeth Walk". The star of the musical, Lupino Lane, reprised his lead role in the film.

== Plot ==
Bill Snibson, a chancer from Lambeth Walk in South London, is informed that he has been discovered to be the long-lost heir to a title and castle which he can claim provided he is able to convince his new relations that he has enough aristocratic bearing. Things soon begin to go awry however, particularly when Sally, Bill's girlfriend from Lambeth, turns up.

== Cast ==
- Lupino Lane as Bill Snibson
- Sally Gray as Sally Smith
- Sir Seymour Hicks as Sir John
- Norah Howard as The Duchess
- Enid Stamp-Taylor as Jacqueline
- Wallace Lupino as Parchester
- Wilfrid Hyde-White as Lord Battersby
- May Hallatt as Lady Battersby
- Charles Heslop as Oswald

== Reception ==
The Monthly Film Bulletin wrote: "Excellent film version of the Victoria Palace stage success, Me and My Girl. ... While following closely the original play, its original cockney verve is enhanced by brisk direction and delightful musical settings. Lupino Lane as the little Cockney, Bill, who inherits a title and humanises his aristocratic relatives, repeats his personal success and reveals a talent for the comedy-pathos of the 'little man' reminiscent of Chaplin. Sally Gray also shows more than average talent as his sweetheart."

Kine Weekly wrote: "The fault with the picture is not in the team-work or in the technical presentation; it is that most of the gags, all of which get their laughs the easy way by allowing the cockney to score off the aristocracy are not only hackneyed but overplayed. The film would have been twice as funny had it been half as long."

The Daily Film Renter wrote: "From a purely technical viewpoint, the film is an unambitious offering, produced at no great cost, and relying upon elementals for success, even custard pies coming into their own. A good many of the jokes are obvious, the humour is often physical, and the ultimate outcome is easily foreseen. Nevertheless, it progresses to the tune of hearty laughs, possibly because it deals with the perennially popular theme of an underdog suddenly skyrocketed to the nobility."

Variety wrote: "Lambeth has its points, and Lane stabs out every now and then for a laugh, but not frequently enough to save it. Two young dolls, who trim off nice hunks of the screenplay, are Sally Gray, the cockney girl Lane refuses to leave behind, and Enid StampTaylor, who displays herself dramatically and physically to good advantage. Norah Howard, the duchess, looks it, and Seymour Hicks is the picture of tea-sipping nobility."
