= Arthur Rigby (actor) =

English actor and writer (1900–1971)

- Photo from a 1965 programme
- Born: Arthur Turner; 27 September 1900; London, UK
- Died: 25 April 1971 (aged 70); Worthing, Sussex, UK
- Occupations: Actor & writer
- Years active: 1928–1965
- Spouse: Sheila MacEvoy
- Relatives: William Franklyn (nephew)

Arthur Rigby (born Arthur Turner; 27 September 1900 – 25 April 1971) was an English actor and writer. He was best known for playing Sgt Flint on the TV series Dixon of Dock Green, appearing in 253 episodes from 1955 to 1965. He also appeared with Dixon 's star Jack Warner in the 1949 film The Blue Lamp, which was also the film in which the character of PC George Dixon was created.

As a writer, Rigby co-wrote the book (with Stanley Lupino), for the musical play So This is Love, which ran for 321 performances at the Winter Garden Theatre in London's West End in 1928. This was adapted to film twice, first as Love Lies, in 1932, and then as Lucky to Me in 1939. Rigby also co-wrote (with Stanley Brightman), the musical comedy Darling, I Love You, which ran for 147 performances at London's Gaiety Theatre in 1930, and was also later filmed as The Deputy Drummer (1935). He additionally supplied stories and scripts for the films Puppets of Fate (1933), Who's Your Father?, Trust the Navy (both 1935), and Hot News (1936).

His parents were the actors Arthur Rigby Sr. and Mary Rigby; and Rigby was sometimes credited as Arthur Rigby Jr.

== Filmography ==
Year	Title	Role	Notes
1932	Jack's the Boy	Police Constable	Uncredited
1933	You Made Me Love You	Brother	
1935	The Deputy Drummer	Sir Henry Sylvester	
1935	Trust the Navy	Lambert Terrain	
1936	Cheer Up	Bill Rachett	
1936	The Prisoner of Corbal	Major	
1936	Hot News		
1938	Hold My Hand	Norman Love	
1950	The Blue Lamp	Policeman at Station	Uncredited
1952	Miss Robin Hood	Detective	Uncredited
1953	The Blue Parrot	Charlie	
1953	Small Town Story	Alf Benson	
1954	Dangerous Cargo	Feathers	
1956	Who Done It?	Police Station Sergeant	Uncredited
1956	The Long Arm	Detective-Inspector at Chester	
1956	Behind the Headlines	Hollings	
1960	Crossroads to Crime	Sergeant Pearson	
