= Arty Ash =

British actor (1895–1954)

Arty Ash, real name Arthur Richard Dodge (14 April 1895 – 6 February 1954) was a British actor. He is well known for appearing with Leslie Sarony in Clonk! (1928), a short comedy film made in the Phonofilm sound-on-film process.

Ash was born Arthur Richard Dodge in 1895, at Lambeth, London, England to Arthur Oliver Dodge and Mary Jane Dodge (née Nidd). He married Marie Florence Goldshede in 1917 and had two children, Daphne and Clive.

== Selected filmography ==
- The Love Race (1931)
- Love Lies (1931)
- Josser on the River (1932)
- Soldiers of the King (1933)
- Honeymoon for Three (1935)
- Sporting Love (1936)
- Cheer Up (1936)
- Guilty Melody (1936)
- Chinatown Nights (1938)
- Dear Octopus (1943)
