= Reginald Long =

British actor and screenwriter

- Occupations: Screenwriter; Actor
- Years active: 1935-1967 (film)

Reginald Long was a British screenwriter and actor. He worked on around twenty screenplays including the 1953 crime film The Limping Man. He also worked on stage, appearing in the wartime West End musical The Lisbon Story.

== Selected filmography ==
=== Screenwriter ===
- Ball at Savoy (1936)
- Hot News (1936)
- Second Bureau (1936)
- The Wife of General Ling (1937)
- Make-Up (1937)
- The Avenging Hand (1937)
- Code of Scotland Yard (1947)
- The First Gentleman (1948)
- To Have and to Hold (1951)
- Death of an Angel (1952)
- The Limping Man (1953)

=== Actor ===
- Trust the Navy (1935)
- The Deputy Drummer (1935)
- Beloved Imposter (1936)
- Hot News (1936)

== Bibliography ==
- Chibnall, Steve & Murphy, Robert. British Crime Cinema. Routledge, 2005.
