= Wallace Lupino =

British actor (1898–1961)

- Born: 23 January 1898; Edinburgh, Scotland
- Died: 11 October 1961 (aged 63); Ashford, Kent, England
- Years active: 1918–1945
- Children: Richard Lupino
- Relatives: Lupino Lane (brother); Stanley Lupino (brother); Ida Lupino (niece)

Wallace Lupino (23 January 1898 – 11 October 1961) was a British-born stage and film actor who was a member of the Lupino family. He appeared in 63 films between 1918 and 1945, most often with his older brother, Lupino Lane. He was born in Edinburgh, Scotland, and died in Ashford, Kent, England.

== Selected filmography ==
- The Fighting Dude (1925)
- His Private Life (1926)
- Children of Chance (1930)
- Never Trouble Trouble (1931)
- No Lady (1931)
- Josser on the River (1932)
- The Innocents of Chicago (1932)
- The Bad Companions (1932)
- The Melody-Maker (1933)
- The Stolen Necklace (1933)
- Trust the Navy (1935)
- The Deputy Drummer (1935)
- The Student's Romance (1935)
- The Man Who Could Work Miracles (1936)
- Love Up the Pole (1936)
- Shipmates o' Mine (1936)
- Hot News (1936)
- The Lambeth Walk (1939)
- Waterloo Road (1945)

== See also ==
- Lupino family
