= Stanley Lupino =

English actor (1893–1942)

- 1930s publicity still
- Born: Stanley Richard Lupino Hook; 15 June 1893; Southwark, London, England
- Died: 10 June 1942 (aged 48); Wandsworth, London, England
- Occupations: Actor; dancer; singer; librettist; director; short story writer
- Spouse: Connie Emerald
- Children: 2, including Ida Lupino
- Parents: George Lupino; Rosina
- Relatives: Barry Lupino (brother); Lupino Lane (cousin); Wallace Lupino (cousin)
- Family: Lupino

Stanley Richard Lupino Hook (15 June 1893 – 10 June 1942), known professionally as Stanley Lupino, was an English actor, dancer, singer, librettist, director and short story writer. During the 1930s, Lupino appeared in a successful series of musical comedy films, often based on his already popular stage shows.

Lupino was a member of the celebrated theatrical Lupino family. His father was the actor George Lupino. He was the brother of actor Barry Lupino (1884–1962) and the father of Ida Lupino.

== Career ==
Lupino began his career as an acrobat. He made his first stage appearance at the age of 6 as a monkey in King Klondyke. After prize fighting for a while, he toured with the Albert and Edmunds troupe of acrobats, the Brother Luck and other vaude units. In 1910 he appeared in Dick Whittington, and 4 years later was signed by his brother, Barry, for a role in Sleeping Beauty. He first became known as a music hall performer and played in pantomimes at the Theatre Royal Drury Lane. In 1917 he played Rono in Arlette by Austen Hurgon and George Arthurs at the Shaftesbury Theatre. In 1920 and 1921 he appeared in Wylie & Tate pantomimes at Sheffield and Cardiff with Daisy Burrell. He appeared with Elsie Janis in Hello, America and wrote the words for Hold My Hand.

Lupino wrote and performed in several shows, including Phi-Phi (1922) and From Dover Street to Dixie (1923) at the London Pavilion. In 1926-'27 he appeared on Broadway in Naughty Riquette and The Nightingale, returning to England to play at the Gaiety Theatre in London, including Love Lies (1929), Hold My Hand (1932), and Sporting Love (1934), which ran for 302 performances. He also wrote and starred in So this is Love (1929) at Drury Lane and The Love Race. He also performed extensively for BBC Radio. Later, he turned to screenwriting and films, although he also continued on stage in works like The Fleet's Lit Up (1939) and Lady Behave (1941) which co-starred Sally Gray.

Lupino wrote a short novel Crazy Days which was published by Herbert Jenkins Ltd in 1932 and his autobiography From the Stocks to the Stars: An Unconventional Autobiography which was published in 1934.

He is buried in Lambeth Cemetery, London.

On 16 February 2016 a commemorative blue plaque was erected to Stanley Lupino and his daughter Ida Lupino by the theatre charity The Music Hall Guild of Great Britain and America at the house where Ida was born in Herne Hill.

== Filmography ==
=== Actor ===
- Love Lies (1931)
- The Love Race (1931)
- Sleepless Nights (1932)
- You Made Me Love You (1933)
- King of the Ritz (1933)
- Facing the Music (1933)
- Happy (1933)
- Honeymoon for Three (1935)
- Cheer Up (1936)
- Sporting Love (1937)
- Hold My Hand (1938)
- Over She Goes (1938)
- Lucky to Me (1939)

=== Writer ===
- Love Lies (1931)
- You Made Me Love You (1933)
- Facing the Music (1933)
- Happy (1933)
- Honeymoon for Three (1935)
- Sporting Love (1937)
- Hold My Hand (1938)
- Over She Goes (1938)
- Lucky to Me (1939)
- Don't Give Up (1947)

=== Producer ===
- Love Lies (1931)
- The Love Race (1931)
- Honeymoon for Three (1935)
- Cheer Up (1936)

== See also ==
- Lupino family
