= Billy Mayerl =

English pianist and composer (1902–1959)

- Born: 31 May 1902; Tottenham Court Road, London, United Kingdom
- Died: 25 March 1959 (aged 56)
- Genre: Light music
- Occupation: Composer
- Instrument: Piano

William Joseph Mayerl (31 May 1902 – 25 March 1959) was an English pianist and composer who built a career in music hall and musical theatre. Best known for his syncopated novelty piano solos, he wrote over 300 piano pieces, many of which were named after flowers and trees, including his best-known composition, "Marigold" (1927). He also ran the successful School of Syncopation, for whose members he published hundreds of his own arrangements of popular songs.

He also composed works for piano and orchestra, often in suites with evocative names such as the Aquarium Suite (1937), comprising "Willow Moss", "Moorish Idol", "Fantail", and "Whirligig".

== Early life and education ==
Mayerl was born in 1902 on London's Tottenham Court Road, near the West End theatre district. His father, a violinist, attempted to introduce him to the violin when Billy was four years old, but without success. After noticing his affinity for the piano, his father instead started him on piano lessons. By the age of seven, Mayerl was studying at the Trinity College of Music, supported by a series of scholarships. He gave his first major concert at age nine, performing Edvard Grieg's Piano Concerto. During his teenage years, he supplemented his studies by accompanying silent films and playing at dances.

While studying at Trinity College, Mayerl began visiting a local music arcade known as "Gayland", where he first encountered North American ragtime music. After trying his hand at composing it, he was threatened with expulsion from Trinity College if he continued, and it was a decade before his first composition was re-issued as "The Jazz Master".

Attracted to North American popular music, Mayerl joined a Southampton hotel band in 1921. He recorded about 37 piano rolls of popular tunes of the early 1920s for the Echo label in London. He subsequently joined the Savoy Havana Band in London and became a celebrity. In the late 20s he recorded in London a single title, "Eskimo Shivers", on the Duo-Art player piano system for the Aeolian Company.

== Career ==
- Cover art of "The Sensational European Novelty Georgie Porgie: Fox-Trot Song" (1924)
- "The Sensational European Novelty Georgie Porgie: Fox-Trot Song" (1924) Mayerl and Gerald "Gee" Paul's adaptation of "Georgie Porgie", published in 1924 by Harms, Inc.

In 1926, Mayerl left the Savoy and opened his "School of Syncopation" which specialised in teaching modern music techniques such as ragtime and stride piano. It led to the long-running correspondence course "How to play like Billy Mayerl". During this period, he wrote his most famous solo, "Marigold". By the late 1930s his correspondence school was believed to have had over 100 staff members and 30,000 students. It closed in 1957.

On 28 October 1925, Mayerl was the soloist in the London premiere of George Gershwin's Rhapsody in Blue. In December 1926, he appeared with Gwen Farrar (1899–1944) in a short film—made in the Lee de Forest Phonofilm sound-on-film process—in which they sang Mayerl's song "I've Got a Sweetie on the Radio". His song "Miss Up-to-Date" was sung and played by Cyril Ritchard in Alfred Hitchcock's sound film Blackmail (1929).

In November 1927, his piano styles accompanied the Hamilton Sisters and Fordyce, American Vaudeville vocal harmonizers who first recorded in England.

On 1 October 1929, Billy Mayerl's orchestra performed at the opening of the Locarno Dance Hall in Streatham.

In the 1930s Mayerl composed several works for the musical theatre, including three connected with horse racing: Sporting Love, opening at the Gaiety Theatre, London in 1934; Twenty to One (Coliseum 1935); and Over She Goes (Saville 1936). In 1938, jazz pianist Marian McPartland joined his group "Mayerl's Claviers" under the name Marian Page.

Mayerl stepped in as bandleader for the Grosvenor House Hotel in May 1941, when Sydney Lipton was called up to serve with the Royal Corps of Signals. Lipton returned after the war.

== Death ==
Mayerl died in 1959 from a heart attack at his home in Beaconsfield, Marigold Lodge, after a long illness.

He was cremated at Golders Green Crematorium in north London on 31 March 1959 and his ashes were placed in the Cedar Lawn Rose Bed. His name is listed in the Book of Remembrance.

== Personal life ==
In 1923 Mayerl married pianist Ermenegilda (Jill) Bernini, a childhood sweetheart. She later helped him write duet arrangements.

== See also ==
- List of ragtime composers

== Bibliography ==
- Marigold: The Music of Billy Mayerl by Prof. Peter Dickinson (Oxford University Press, 1999), ISBN 978-0198162131
