= Everybody Dance (film) =

- Original trade ad
- Directed by: Charles Reisner
- Screenplay by: Leslie Arliss; Ralph Spence
- Based on: a story by Leslie Arliss & Stafford Dickens
- Produced by: Michael Balcon
- Starring: Cicely Courtneidge; Ernest Truex; Percy Parsons; Alma Taylor
- Cinematography: Jack Cox
- Edited by: R. E. Dearing
- Music by: Words & music: Mack Gordon; Harry Revel; Musical director: Louis Levy
- Production companies: Gainsborough Pictures; Gaumont British
- Distributed by: Gaumont British Distributors
- Release dates: September 1936 (London, England)
- Running time: 74 minutes
- Country: United Kingdom
- Language: English

Everybody Dance is a 1936 British musical film directed by Charles Reisner and starring Cicely Courtneidge, Ernest Truex, Percy Parsons and Alma Taylor. The film's sets were designed by Alex Vetchinsky. It was made at Islington Studios.

Sidney Gilliat called it "dreadful".

== Plot ==
When a successful nightclub singer (Cicely Courtneidge) finds herself guardian to her late sisters children, she ditches her singing career and takes the kids to live on a farm. Her manager is less than happy and resorts to legal means to try and stop her.

== Cast ==
- Cicely Courtneidge as Katharine 'Lady Kate' Levering
- Ernest Truex as Wilbur Spurgeon
- Percy Parsons as Josiah Spurgeon
- Alma Taylor as Rosemary Spurgeon
- Chuck Reisner Jr. as Tony Spurgeon
- Billie De la Volta as Shirley Spurgeon
- Kathleen Harrison as Lucy
- Bruce Winston as Pierre
- C. Denier Warren as Dan Fleming
- Peter Gawthorne as Sir Rowland Morton
- Helen Haye as Lady Morton
- Janet Johnson as Lilian Morton
- Joan Ponsford as Dorothy Morton

== Bibliography ==
- Low, Rachael. Filmmaking in 1930s Britain. George Allen & Unwin, 1985.
- Wood, Linda. British Films, 1927-1939. British Film Institute, 1986.
