= Heat Wave (1935 film) =

- Directed by: Maurice Elvey
- Written by: Leslie Arliss; Jerome Jackson; Austin Melford
- Starring: Albert Burdon; Cyril Maude; Les Allen
- Cinematography: Glen MacWilliams
- Edited by: Paul Capon
- Music by: Louis Levy
- Production company: Gainsborough Pictures
- Distributed by: Gaumont British Distributors
- Release date: May 1935
- Running time: 72 minutes
- Country: United Kingdom
- Language: English

Heat Wave is a 1935 British comedy film directed by Maurice Elvey and starring Albert Burdon, Cyril Maude and Les Allen.

It was titled The Code originally.

== Plot ==
A British vegetable salesman accidentally gets mixed up in a planned revolution in South America.

== Cast ==
- Albert Burdon as Albert Speed
- Cyril Maude as President Allison
- Les Allen as Tom Brown
- Anna Lee as Jane Allison
- Vera Pearce as Gloria Spania
- Bernard Nedell as Gen. Da Costa
- C. Denier Warren as Col. D'Alvarez
- Bruce Winston as Lerone
- Edmund Willard as Hoffman
- Finlay Currie as Captain
- Grace Poggi as Dancer

== Production ==
It was made at Islington Studios by Gainsborough Pictures. The film's sets were designed by the Austrian art director Oscar Friedrich Werndorff.

== Release ==
Variety wrote "Plenty of old and surefire gags in this one, but enough original touches to make for pleasing entertainment. Cyril Maude... is a delight... Not too much music to detract from the story, nor too much plot to strain the intellect. Pleasing all- round amusement."

== Bibliography ==
- Low, Rachael. Filmmaking in 1930s Britain. George Allen & Unwin, 1985.
- Wood, Linda. British Films, 1927-1939. British Film Institute, 1986.
