= Stormy Weather (1935 film) =

- Opening titles
- Directed by: Tom Walls
- Written by: Ben Travers
- Produced by: Michael Balcon
- Starring: Tom Walls; Ralph Lynn; Robertson Hare; Yvonne Arnaud
- Cinematography: Philip Tannura
- Edited by: Alfred Roome
- Music by: Louis Levy; Jack Beaver
- Production company: Gainsborough Pictures
- Distributed by: Gaumont British Distributors
- Release date: August 1935
- Running time: 74 minutes
- Country: United Kingdom
- Language: English

Stormy Weather (also known as Get out of It and Get Out) is a 1935 British comedy film directed by Tom Walls and starring Walls, Ralph Lynn and Robertson Hare. It was written by Ben Travers.

== Plot ==
Sir Duncan Craggs retires from the Colonial Service and returns to London with his new French wife. The couple are devoted to each other, but continually flirt with other people. Sir Duncan is appointed to the board of clothing retail chain. On his tour of inspection, he encounters a successful store run by the efficient Mr. Bullock. By contrast, a neighbouring shop is filled with unhelpful staff overseen by an incompetent and lazy manager, Raymond Penny, who is more interested in horseracing than running his shop. Craggs is unimpressed by Penny and summons him to a meeting in London. Both Bullock and his domineering wife travel up to London as well, fearing that Penny will tell Craggs malicious stories about them.

Back in London, Mrs. Craggs is horrified to discover she is still married to the White Russian Count Polotsky, whom she had thought was dead. The villainous Polotsky plans to kidnap her and blackmail her new husband. Craggs, Penny and Bullock eventually rescue her from the Chinatown dive where she is being held. It is discovered that Polotsky has married a young Chinese woman and is equally guilty of bigamy. They are able to recover all incriminating evidence as well. In gratitude, Craggs appoints Penny as his assistant.

== Cast ==
- Tom Walls as Sir Duncan Craggs
- Ralph Lynn as Mr. Raymond Penny
- Yvonne Arnaud as Louise Craggs
- Robertson Hare as Mr. Bullock
- Norma Varden as Mrs. Dulcie Bullock
- Andrews Engelmann as Count Polotsky
- Davy Burnaby as Merritt
- Veronica Rose as Trixie Merritt
- Stella Moya as Moya
- Gordon James as Salt Jasper
- Louis Bradfield as Lacey
- Fewlass Llewellyn as Pullman
- Peter Gawthorne as Police Inspector

== Production ==
Since 1930, a popular series of film adaptations of Ben Travers' Aldwych Farces had been released. Although this film was based on an original screenplay by Travers rather than one of his stage farces, it features a number of actors who had appeared in Aldwych films. The film was made by Gainsborough Pictures at Islington Studios, with sets designed by art director Alex Vetchinsky.

== Reception ==
The Monthly Film Bulletin wrote: "All the elements of first-rate comedy are included: comic characters, witty dialogue, comic actions, and comic situations are most happily combined in accomplished acting, with singularly appropriate musical accompaniment, to keep the audience in constant laughter. ... Tom Walls as the supremely composed and politely insolent Managing Director, Ralph Lynn as the 'silly ass' incompetent Branch Manager, Yvonne Arnaud as the wife who must have masculine attention, from elsewhere if the husband defaults, have not only real comedy character parts to act – which they do extremely well – but also combine to make a fast-moving, complete and satisfying production."

Kine Weekly wrote: "Boisterous farcical comedy, a merry medley of crime comedy and slapstick thrills, fashioned from the experienced and popular pen of Ben Travers. The plot may flag a little in places, but the never-failing English comedians, Tom Walls, Ralph Lynn and Robertson, reveal all the resource necessary to fill in the gaps. They deliver the goods, and their fans, meaning nine picturegoers out of ten, will not be disappointed. First-rate light entertainment with big star pull."

Picturegoer wrote: "The most attractive thing in this formula-as-before-Walls-Lynn-Travers farce is the performance of Yvonne Arnaud as the flirtatious foreign wife of the Managing Director of a big commercial concern. She is excellent, and walks away with the acting honours in a story that sometimes mistakes vulgarity for subtlety and deals in a broad farcial manner with the activities of a Russian blackmailer who is finally defeated by the combined efforts of an elderly roué, played by Tom Walls, and an asinine shop manager played in his usual vein by Ralph Lynn. Robertson Hare scores as a pompous little man who, as usual, gets all the kicks and no halfpence while Andrews Engelman is good as the blackmailer, in spite of the poorness of the dialogue with which he is fed. Just for Yvonne Arnaud's performance the film is worthwhile."
