= Said O'Reilly to McNab =

- video cover
- Directed by: William Beaudine
- Screenplay by: Leslie Arliss; Marriott Edgar; Howard Irving Young
- Produced by: Edward Black
- Starring: Will Mahoney; Will Fyffe; Ellis Drake
- Cinematography: Arthur Crabtree
- Edited by: Alfred Roome
- Music by: Jack Beaver; Louis Levy
- Production company: Gainsborough Pictures
- Distributed by: General Film Distributors
- Release date: July 1937
- Running time: 80 minutes
- Country: United Kingdom
- Language: English

Said O'Reilly to McNab is a 1937 British comedy film directed by William Beaudine and starring Will Mahoney, Will Fyffe and Ellis Drake. It was made at Islington Studios by Gainsborough Pictures. The film's sets were designed by the art director Alex Vetchinsky. Leslie Arliss and Marriott Edgar wrote the screenplay.

The movie was one of several comedies made at Gainsborough under Ted Black.

== Plot ==
American confidence trickster Timothy O'Reilly has to flee New York with the law after him for his dubious business activities. He goes with his loyal, quick-thinking secretary across the Atlantic to Scotland where his son Terence is living.

O'Reilly finds Terence is in love with the daughter of Malcolm McNab, a tight-fisted local businessman. The two engage in a certain amount of rivalry while O'Reilly tries to find a way to refresh his financial fortune and get McNab's permission for their children to marry. These include a game of golf at which both try to cheat and a miracle new dieting pill which is in fact just a caramel sweet.

== Cast ==
- Will Mahoney as Colonel Timothy O'Reilly
- Will Fyffe as Malcolm McNab
- Ellis Drake as Mrs McNab
- Jean Winstanley as Mary McNab
- James Carney as Terence O'Reilly
- Sandy McDougal as Jock McKay
- Marianne Davis as Sophie
- Lillian Urquhart as Maggie
- Percy Parsons as Mr Dunkel
- Robert Gall as Jock Mc Nab

== Bibliography ==
- Marshall, Wendy L. William Beaudine: from silents to television. Scarecrow Press, 2005.
- Wood, Linda. British Films, 1927-1939. British Film Institute, 1986.
