= Shipyard Sally =

- Directed by: Monty Banks
- Written by: Don Ettlinger; Gracie Fields; Thomas J. Geraghty; Karl Tunberg; Val Valentine
- Produced by: Robert Kane
- Starring: Gracie Fields; Sydney Howard; Norma Varden
- Cinematography: Otto Kanturek
- Edited by: R. E. Dearing; Alfred Roome
- Music by: Louis Levy
- Production company: Twentieth Century Productions
- Distributed by: Twentieth Century Fox
- Release date: 16 October 1939 (UK)
- Running time: 77 minutes
- Country: United Kingdom
- Language: English
- Budget: £255,057

Shipyard Sally is a 1939 British musical comedy film directed by Monty Banks and starring Gracie Fields, Sydney Howard and Norma Varden. It was written by Don Ettlinger, Fields, Thomas J. Geraghty, Karl Tunberg and Val Valentine.

The film contains the song "Wish Me Luck as You Wave Me Goodbye".

== Plot ==
Sally, a failed music hall performer, and her father take over a pub near the John Brown & Company shipyard at Clydebank. When the closure of the yard threatens to put many out of work she leads a campaign to persuade the government to reconsider the decision.

== Production ==
Made shortly before the outbreak of the Second World War, it was Fields' last British film. It was shot at Islington Studios with sets designed by Alex Vetchinsky.

== Cast ==
- Gracie Fields as Sally Fitzgerald
- Sydney Howard as Major Fitzgerald
- Morton Selten as Lord Alfred Randall
- Norma Varden as Lady Patricia Randall
- Oliver Wakefield as Forsyth
- Tucker McGuire as Linda Marsh
- MacDonald Parke as Diggs
- Richard Cooper as Sir John Treacher
- Joan Cowick as secretary
- Monty Banks as Marsh's doctor (uncredited)

== Reception ==
The Monthly Film Bulletin wrote: "An excellent team assists Gracie, who works hard and has a variety of songs to sing. Sydney Howard as the derelict Major, her father, is a real character, Morton Selton gives amiable dignity to Lord Randal and Oliver Wakefield and Norma Varden contribute characteristic comedy."

Kine Weekly wrote: "The basic gag is bound up in Sally's repeated efforts to beard the touchy but human Randall in his den, and the star makes the most of the robust, if obvious, humour. She improvises, sings and keeps the supporting players on their toes. The opening scenes of the launching of the Queen Mary, and the closing ones, illustrating after a moment of disappointment the resuscitation of life in the shipyard are also showmanlike but the piéce de résistance is the patriotic vocal climax. Here the star is supreme. She flag-wags the film to certain success. ... It's the Gracie Fields picture that the public has been waiting for."

Picturegoer wrote: "Gracie Fields has done nothing better than Shipyard Sally. It is a truly riotous comedy with an underlying note of seriousness dealing with unemployment in the Clydeside."

Picture Show wrote: "There will be few who see this film who do not think that it is Gracie Fields' best film to date. She is at the top of her form, and her warmly human, sympathetic personality, with its stiffening of common sense and shrewd humour, has never been seen to better advantage."

Variety wrote: "Shipyard Sally is one of Gracie Fields' best films. It provides plausible excuses for her to sing and dance, innumerable opportunities for her inimitable comedy, and sufficient story for the introduction of emotional sequences. An impressive production and intelligent direction of a well-written script, with serviceable supporting cast, combine for certain success in this country, especially in the provinces, and better than an even chance in the U.S."

== Bibliography ==
- Shafer, Stephen C. British Popular Films 1929–1939:The Cinema of Reassurance. Rutledge, 1997. ISBN 978-0-415-00282-0.
- Wood, Linda. British Films, 1927–1939. British Film Institute, 1986.
