= Love Story (1944 film) =

- DVD cover
- Directed by: Leslie Arliss
- Written by: Rodney Ackland (dialogue)
- Screenplay by: Leslie Arliss; Doreen Montgomery
- Based on: "Love Story" by J. W. Drawbell
- Produced by: Harold Huth
- Starring: Margaret Lockwood; Stewart Granger; Patricia Roc
- Cinematography: Bernard Knowles
- Edited by: Charles Knott
- Music by: Hubert Bath
- Production company: Gainsborough Pictures
- Distributed by: Eagle-Lion Distributors (UK); Universal Pictures (USA)
- Release date: 20 November 1944 (UK)
- Running time: 113 minutes
- Country: United Kingdom
- Language: English
- Budget: £125,000
- Box office: £200,000

Love Story is a 1944 British black-and-white romance film directed by Leslie Arliss and starring Margaret Lockwood, Stewart Granger, and Patricia Roc. Based on a short story by J. W. Drawbell, the film is about a concert pianist who, after learning that she is dying of heart failure, decides to spend her last days in Cornwall. While there, she meets a former RAF pilot who is going blind, and soon a romantic attraction forms. Released in the United States as A Lady Surrenders, this wartime melodrama produced by Gainsborough Pictures was filmed on location at the Minack Theatre in Porthcurno in Cornwall, England.

== Plot ==
Concert pianist Felicity Crichton Lissa Campbell leaves her successful music career to devote herself to the British war effort. She applies to be in the Women's Auxiliary Air Force, part of the RAF, but is rejected for health reasons. She then learns that she has a heart condition and does not have long to live.

Determined to live her final months fully, she goes to a resort in Cornwall. Not wanting to be recognised, she introduces herself as Lissa. She is soon befriended by Tom Tanner, a salty old Yorkshireman, on government assignment to investigate mines. He sees her sadness, but does not pry.

She meets Kit Firth, a brash young engineer, and they form an association. She does not know Kit will soon be blind due to a war injury. The only one who knows is Judy, his childhood friend who is secretly in love with him. Meanwhile, Tom arranges for a piano to be provided for Lissa and she begins composing,(music later to become famous as the Cornish Rhapsody) inspired by her new environment and by Kit. Later, Kit introduces Lissa to Judy, who is working on an open-air play. Judy persuades Tom to invest in her production of The Tempest.

Kit and Lissa's romance grows but, whenever things become serious, Kit backs away. Lissa grows increasingly frustrated, especially after he refuses Tom's offer to supervise the reopening of a mine in which Kit has found much-needed molybdenum, and she finally breaks up with him. Kit confesses to Judy that he has never met anyone as understanding as Lissa.

The next day a mining accident traps Tom and his crew. When Kit descends the mine, he too becomes trapped but is able to escape and rescue them, proving he is not a coward. When Lissa finds him practising reading Braille, everything falls into place. She urges him to have surgery, but he says the doctors estimated his chances of surviving it were 100 to one, and that Judy had talked him out of it.

Lissa gets Judy to admit she views blindness as a godsend; Kit would have to turn to her. They agree Lissa will leave him if Judy persuades Kit to have the operation. After Kit leaves for surgery, Judy and her company prepare for their play. For the premiere, Judy is unable to go on until she hears the results of the imminent surgery. Lissa placates the audience for the delay by performing her new composition inspired by Kit. During her performance, she is overwhelmed by the same fear, and faints.

When Lissa recovers, she is reassured that Kit is well. When Judy thanks her for giving up Kit, Lissa admits that she is not giving up much—because she is dying. True to her word, she says goodbye to Kit, saying she will be going on a world tour and may not see him again. Despite his profession of love, Lissa leaves, heartbroken. In the coming weeks she travels the world, entertaining the troops. Meanwhile, Kit proposes to Judy and she accepts, but their relationship lacks passion. Despite Tom's advice to her to accept the truth and not cheat another woman out of the love she deserves, Judy insists she will not give up Kit.

Sometime later, Lissa is performing at the Royal Albert Hall. After her final number, she spots Kit in the wings in his RAF uniform, and runs into his arms before fainting. When she recovers, she sees Judy. Recognising that he will always love Lissa, Judy announces, to Kit's surprise, that they will not be getting married and leaves abruptly – Kit never belonged to her. Lissa finally reveals she only has months to live. Kit tells her they must take what happiness they can.

== Cast ==
- Margaret Lockwood as Lissa Campbell
- Stewart Granger as Kit Firth
- Patricia Roc as Judy
- Tom Walls as Tom Tanner
- Reginald Purdell as Albert
- Walter Hudd as Ray
- A. E. Matthews as Col. Pitt Smith
- Josephine Middleton as Mrs. Pitt Smith
- Beatrice Varley as Miss Rossiter
- Laurence Hanray as Angus Rossiter
- Brian Herbert as Stuttering Cornish Fisherman
- Roy Emerton as Cornish Fisherman
- George Merritt as Telephone Engineer
- Moira Lister as Carol
- Sidney Beer as Conductor
- Dorothy Bramhall as Susie
- Vincent Holman as Prospero
- Joan Rees as Ariel

== Production ==
Arliss admitted gaining inspiration from a number of magazine stories, called "Love and Forget", "The Ship Sailed at Night" and "A Night in Algiers".

Love Story was filmed at Gaumont-British Studios in Lime Grove, Shepherd's Bush, London, and the Minack Theatre in Porthcurno in Cornwall, England. The final concert scenes were filmed at the Royal Albert Hall in London.

Lockwood had not played piano since school but learned how to play the concerto for realism in her performance. She practiced for hours every day with Harriet Cohen, who performed on the soundtrack. "In the end I was able to play with not too many mistakes," wrote Lockwood. She wrote that she and Roc had to "slap each other's faces constantly, til we both ached."

Stewart Granger was making Waterloo Road at the same time as this film. He says Gainsborough was bombed while making Love Story, which he later called "a load of crap – and a smash hit!"

== Reception ==
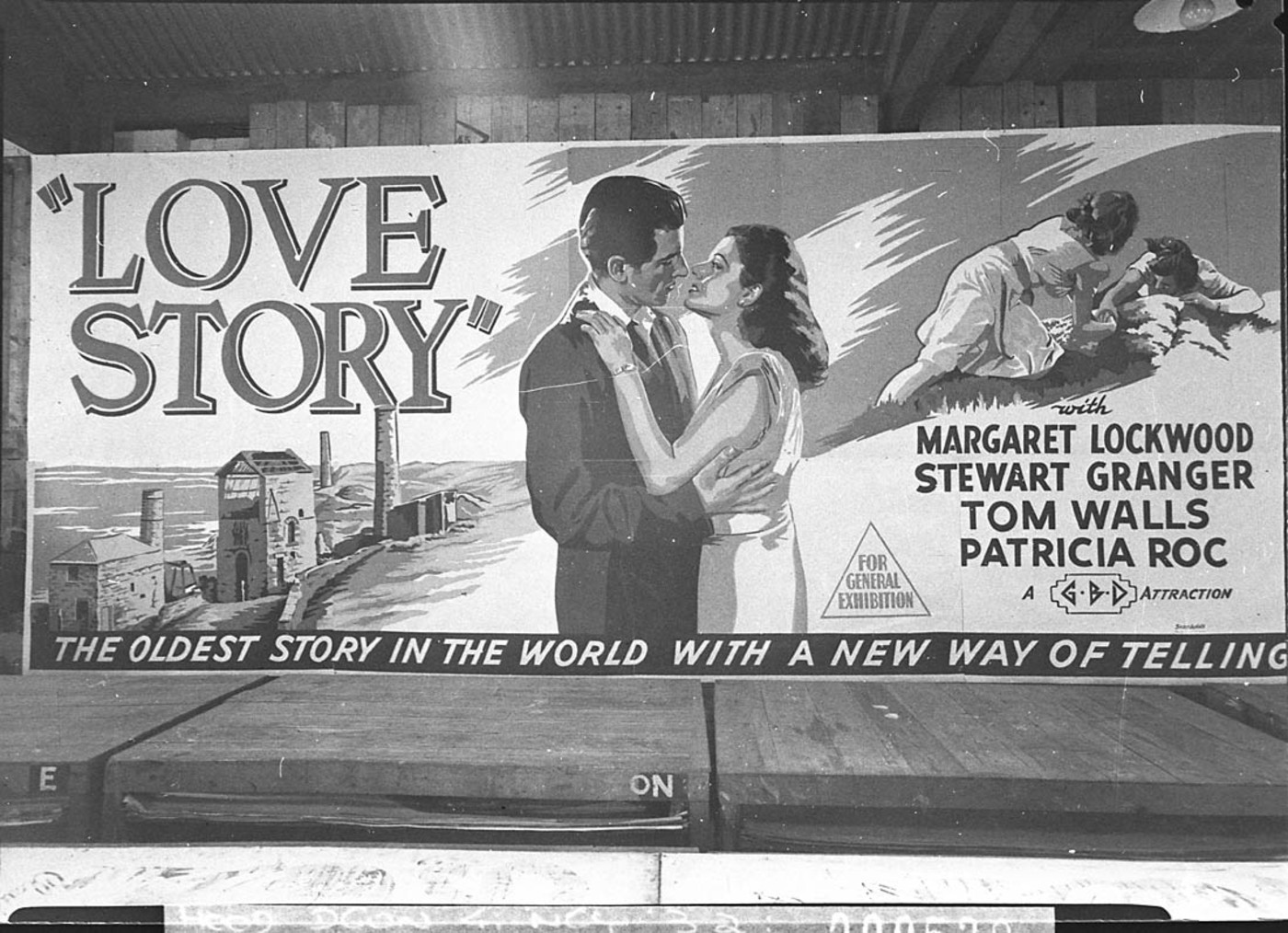
Advertisement for the film on display in Sydney, Australia (1946)

=== Box office ===
The film was very popular at the British box office. According to Kinematograph Weekly the 'biggest winners' at the box office in 1944 Britain were For Whom the Bell Tolls, This Happy Breed, The Song of Bernadette, Going My Way, This Is the Army, Jane Eyre, The Story of Dr Wassell, Cover Girl, White Cliffs of Dover, Sweet Rosie O'Grady and Fanny By Gaslight (the latter being from the same studio as Love Story, and also starring Stewart Granger). The biggest British hits of the year were This Happy Breed, with runners up being Fanny By Gaslight, The Way Ahead and Love Story. It made more money than any other film in Britain in November 1944.

=== Critical ===
In his review of the DVD release, Jeremy Arnold excused the film's overly melodramatic storyline and lack of realism and appreciated the context in which the film was released. "For wartime British audiences", Arnold wrote, "a melodramatic romance dealing with death, heroism and sacrifice, lushly photographed amidst the shores of Cornwall, must have served as a shot in the arm." Arnold found the film to be "so skillfully made that what seems like contrived melodrama in the abstract comes off more as just a sweeping romantic aura on screen." Arnold praised the acting in the film, writing that Lockwood "delivers a solid performance" and that the supporting actors, Tom Walls and Patricia Roc, stole the film. A well-known comic actor of the British stage and screen whose career began in 1905, Walls appeared in Love Story toward the end of his life. Patricia Roc was in some ways the more desirable of the two romantic choices, according to Arnold, who noted that "our eyes go to her more than to Lockwood whenever the two share the screen."

Film scholar William K. Everson wrote that the film "enabled the housewives, themselves much put upon, to wallow in the greater and more artificial self-sacrifice shown on the screen and to find in it a kind of contemporary escapism."
