= All In (film) =

1936 British film by Marcel Varnel

- Directed by: Marcel Varnel
- Written by: Val Guest; Leslie Arliss
- Based on: Tattenham Corner by Philip Merivale & Brandon Fleming
- Produced by: Michael Balcon
- Starring: Ralph Lynn; Gina Malo; Jack Barty; Claude Dampier
- Cinematography: Arthur Crabtree
- Edited by: Alfred Roome
- Music by: Louis Levy
- Production company: Gainsborough Pictures
- Distributed by: Gaumont British Distributors
- Release date: November 1936
- Running time: 71 minutes
- Country: United Kingdom
- Language: English

All In (also known as Tattenham Corner) is a 1936 British sports comedy film directed by Marcel Varnel and starring Ralph Lynn, Gina Malo and Garry Marsh. It was written by Guest and Leslie Arliss, based on the play Tattenham Corner by Philip Merivale and Brandon Fleming, which takes its name from a sharp bend on Epsom Racecourse, where the Derby is run.

The owner of a racing stables has high hopes of winning The Derby, but fate intervenes.

== Cast ==
- Ralph Lynn as Archie Slott
- Gina Malo as Kay Slott
- Jack Barty as Tom "Tingaling Tom"
- Claude Dampier as "Toop"
- Sydney Fairbrother as Genesta Slott
- Garry Marsh as Lilleywhite
- Robert Nainby as Eustace Slott
- O. B. Clarence as Hemingway
- Gibb McLaughlin as Reverend Cuppleditch
- Glennis Lorimer as Kitty
- Fewlass Llewellyn as Dean of Plinge

== Production ==
The film was made at Islington Studios by Gainsborough Pictures with sets designed by the art director Alex Vetchinsky.

== Reception ==
The Monthly Film Bulletin wrote: "The direction is thoroughly efficient. The most in the way of laughs is got out of every situation, and none is unduly prolonged. With so much that is in its own way thoroughly entertaining it is to be regretted that there are one or two less satisfactory elements. The dialogue is in the main bright and amusing, but there are a number of quite unnecessary doubles entendres."

Kine Weekly wrote: "There are no unexpected twists in this very British comedy; it gets going with the inevitable garden fete and seldom leaves well-worn paths, but in spite of its crop of chestnuts, and somewhat clumsy quips and innuendoes, it manages to promote an adequate amount of popular knockabout humour before it fades out."

The Daily Film Renter wrote: "Ralph Lynn, bemonocled as usual, gives the performance his admirers have come to expect, dithering a tortuous way through numerous difficulties, with Providence ensuring his final success. Claude Dampier, another stylised comic, pulls his weight as team mate, and Gina Malo supplies the feminine element."

Picturegoer wrote: "The action is kept going by Marcel Varnel at commendable speed and the scenes of all-in wrestling provide a very good example of slapstick fooling. Ralph Lynn gets mixed up in these, and demonstrates that the life of a comedian certainly has its ups and downs."

== See also ==
- List of films about horses
- List of films about horse racing
