= Princess Charming (film) =

1934 film

- Directed by: Maurice Elvey
- Written by: Lauri Wylie; Arthur Wimperis; L. du Garde Peach; Robert Edmunds
- Produced by: Michael Balcon
- Starring: Evelyn Laye; Henry Wilcoxon; Yvonne Arnaud; George Grossmith
- Cinematography: Mutz Greenbaum
- Edited by: Derek N. Twist
- Music by: Leighton Lucas; Louis Levy
- Production company: Gainsborough Pictures
- Distributed by: Gaumont British Distributors
- Release date: 25 April 1934
- Running time: 78 minutes
- Country: United Kingdom
- Language: English

Princess Charming, also known as Alexandra, is a 1934 British musical comedy film directed by Maurice Elvey and starring Evelyn Laye, Henry Wilcoxon, and Yvonne Arnaud. It was made at Islington Studios by Gainsborough Pictures. The film's sets were designed by Ernő Metzner. It is part of the operetta film genre that was popular during the era.

== Plot ==
A Ruritanian princess is betrothed to the king of a neighbouring country, but falls in love with the army officer sent to escort her there. Meanwhile, a revolution breaks out.

== Cast ==
- Evelyn Laye as Princess Elaine
- Henry Wilcoxon as Captain André Launa
- Yvonne Arnaud as Countess Annette
- George Grossmith as King Christian of Aufland
- Max Miller as Walter Chuff aka Sam
- Ivor McLaren as Ernest
- Finlay Currie as Baron Seegman
- Ivor Barnard as Ivanoff
- Francis L. Sullivan as Alakiev
- Dino Galvani as Louis
- Gordon Begg as Sir John
- Eliot Makeham as The real Walter Chuff
- Cecil Parker as Mr. Thompson
- Percy Parsons as Royalist
- D. J. Williams as Philip
- Toni Edgar-Bruce
- Neal Arden

== Bibliography ==
- Wood, Linda (1986). British Films, 1927–1939. London: British Film Institute. ISBN 978-0-85170-189-9.
