= The Innocents of Chicago =

1932 film

- Trade show advertisement
- Directed by: Lupino Lane
- Written by: Reginald Simpson; Lupino Lane
- Based on: play by J. W. Drawbell; Leslie Arliss
- Produced by: Lupino Lane
- Starring: Henry Kendall; Margot Grahame; Binnie Barnes
- Cinematography: Ernest Palmer
- Edited by: Leslie Norman
- Music by: Harry Acres
- Production company: British International Pictures
- Distributed by: Wardour Films
- Release date: 31 March 1932
- Running time: 63 minutes
- Country: United Kingdom
- Language: English

The Innocents of Chicago (also known as Why Saps Leave Home and The Milky Way) is a 1932 British comedy film directed by Lupino Lane and starring Henry Kendall, Binnie Barnes and Margot Grahame. It was written by Leslie Arliss and Lane based on the play The Milky Way by Reginald Simpson and J. W. Drawbell.

== Plot ==
Percy Lloyd arrives in Chicago to take over a milk company bequeathed to him by his uncle. In fact the business is a front for a bootlegging racket, but Lloyd is so innocent of the gangster scene that he doesn't realise. He gets caught up in a feud between rival gangs, but emerges intact, rich and with a new bride.

== Cast ==
- Henry Kendall as Percy Lloyd
- Betty Norton as Betty Woods
- Margot Grahame as Lil
- Bernard Nedell as Tony Costello
- Binnie Barnes as Peg Guinan
- Ben Welden as Spike Guinan
- Wallace Lupino as gangster
- Charles Farrell as Smiler
- Cyril Smith as gangster
- Ernest Sefton as gangster
- Val Guest as gangster

== Production ==
The film was made by British International Pictures at Elstree Studios with sets designed by art director Duncan Sutherland.

== Reception ==
Film Weekly wrote: "Fast and furious slapstick fun in a high-speed burlesque of American gangster films, wherein Elstree takes several leaves out of Hollywood's book of words. Lupino Lane hustles his story along in a way that is highly appropriate to its subject ... All the known (and some unknown) practices of the film gangster are seized upon and reduced to flagrant absurdity in a riot of nonsense, culminating in a spectacular battle between the human 'gorillas' engaged in rival rackets. ... The film is slickly, though modestly, produced and staged."

Kine Weekly wrote: "A bright, cheery burlesque on Chicago gangsters and their methods, which has excellent atmosphere and characterisation and moves at a merry pace. Considering the difficulties which beset a producer who attempts to burlesque that which is in itself fantastic, Lupino Lane has done his work well, and has punctuated the proceedings with riotous rough stuff which is certain to delight popular audiences."
