= George Benson (actor) =

British actor (1911–1983)

- Born: George Frederick Percy Benson; 11 January 1911; Cardiff, Wales
- Died: 17 June 1983 (aged 72); London, England
- Education: RADA
- Occupation: Actor

George Frederick Percy Benson (11 January 1911 – 17 June 1983) was a British actor of both theatre and screen, whose career stretched from the 1930s to the early 1970s. He was on stage from the late 1920s, and made his film debut in 1932 in Holiday Lovers written by Leslie Arliss. His most notable work as a comic actor included supporting roles with George Formby (Keep Fit - 1937) and Ronnie Barker (A Home of Your Own - 1964).

== Early life ==
Benson was born in Cardiff and educated at Blundell's School, the son of Leslie Bernard Gilpin Benson and his wife Isita. The family moved to Weston-super-Mare around 1920 and to Bristol around 1925. He began acting at school in the Latin plays mounted annually at the school. He trained for the stage at the Royal Academy of Dramatic Art (where he was the Silver Medallist in 1930).

== Early career ==
Much of Benson's early work was in revue, particularly those mounted in the 1930s by Andre Charlot. In 1932-3 he toured Australia with the company of Athene Seyler and Nicholas Hannen and on the tour met Seyler's daughter, Jane Anne Sterndale Bennett, who would become his first wife. In 1936 he achieved his first real success, as Edward Gill in Herbert and Eleanor Farjeon's musical The Two Bouquets. He continued to work with Herbert Farjeon until he was called up for war service in 1940, appearing in the revues Nine Sharp and The Little Revue. He served with the Royal Artillery for six years, mostly in anti-aircraft units.

== Later career ==
After the war, he played the part of the solicitor Desmond Curry in Terence Rattigan's The Winslow Boy on an extensive tour of the US (1947–1948), before returning to revue in the highly successful Lyric and Globe Revues. in 1955 he joined the Old Vic Company (with Robert Helpmann and Katharine Hepburn) on a tour of Australia, playing the clown roles in Measure for Measure, The Merchant of Venice and The Taming of the Shrew. During the late 1950s he cemented his reputation as skilled comedy actor in a succession of stage roles, perhaps notably that of Arthur Groomkirby in N. F. Simpson's 'Theatre of the Absurd' play One Way Pendulum.

Although still noted as a comedy actor, during the 1960s he showed he could also excel in darker and more serious roles. In 1961 he played the murderer Dr Crippen in Wolf Mankowitz's musical Belle, or the Ballad of Dr Crippen, and Boss Mangan in Bernard Shaw's Heartbreak House. In the early 1970s he appeared in several plays with Bernard Miles at the Mermaid Theatre, notably as the Inquisitor in St Joan. In 1973, while appearing as Polonius in Hamlet, he suffered a stroke which affected his speech and ended his career.

== Personal life ==
He married, first, Jane Ann Sterndale Bennett, a granddaughter of the composer William Sterndale Bennett. They had two daughters, Caroline and Elizabeth. His second wife was Pamela Enid White, also (briefly) an actor. They had one son, Christopher. Benson took a keen interest in theatre history, and was Chairman of the Society for Theatre Research from 1968-72.

== Filmography ==
=== Film ===
Year	Title	Role	Notes
1932	Holiday Lovers	Oswald	
1933	The Man from Toronto	Villager	Uncredited
1937	Keep Fit	Ernie Gill	
1937	Red Peppers	Bert Bentley	Short
1937	Music-Hall Cavalcade: Stars of Yesterday and Today	Chairman	TV film
1937	Dick Whittington and His Cat		Short
1938	Rush Hour		TV film
1938	Break the News	Firing Squad Officer	
1939	The Gamblers	Alexey	TV film
1939	Young Man's Fancy	Booking Clerk	
1940	Convoy	Parker	
1947	Here's Looking at You		TV film
1947	The Ugly Duckling	The King	Short
1947	Maria Marten or, the Murder at the Red Barn	Timothy Winterbottom	TV film
1947	The Merchant of Venice	Launcelot Gobbo	TV film
1947	Rosmersholm	Ulric Brendel	TV film
1947	The October Man	Mr. Pope	
1948	The Light of Heart	Barty	TV film
1949	A Word in Your Eye		TV film
1949	Helter Skelter	Temporary Waiter	
1949	The Lost People	Driver	
1950	Madeleine	Chemist	Uncredited
1950	The Happiest Days of Your Life	Mr. Tripp	
1950	Cage of Gold	Assistant Registrar	
1950	Highly Dangerous	Sandwich Stand Customer	
1951	Pool of London	George	Uncredited
1951	The Man in the White Suit	The Lodger	
1951	Appointment with Venus	Senior Clerk	
1952	Mother Riley Meets the Vampire	Police Sergeant	
1952	The Globe Revue		TV film
1953	The Captain's Paradise	Mr. Salmon	
1953	The Broken Horseshoe	Prescott	
1953	The New Morality	E. Wallace Wister	TV film
1953	Three's Company	George Bailey	
1954	Doctor in the House	Lecturer on drains	
1954	Aunt Clara	Photographer	Uncredited
1954	Lilacs in the Spring	Theatre Royal manager	Uncredited
1954	Tons of Money	James Chesterman, a solicitor	TV film
1955	Value for Money	Trombonist	
1956	Fanny's First Play	Mr. Robin Gilbey	TV film
1957	The Naked Truth	Photographer	Uncredited
1958	Charles and Mary	William Godwin	TV film
1958	Dracula	Official	
1959	Model for Murder	Freddie	
1959	Left Right and Centre	Egerton	
1960	David and Broccoli	Headmaster	TV film
1960	The Pure Hell of St Trinian's	Defence Counsel	
1964	A Jolly Bad Fellow	Inspector Butts	
1965	A Home of Your Own	Gatekeeper	
1966	The Great St Trinian's Train Robbery	Gore-Blackwood	
1968	The Strange Affair	Uncle Bertrand	
1968	Journey into Darkness	The Vicar	
1970	The Private Life of Sherlock Holmes	Inspector Lestrade	Uncredited
1972	What Became of Jack and Jill?	Vicar	
1972	A Warning to the Curious	Vicar	TV film
1973	The Creeping Flesh	Waterlow	

=== Television ===
Year	Title	Role	Notes
1950	BBC Sunday Night Theatre	Tom Buttle	Episode: "The Happy Sunday Afternoon"
1950	BBC Sunday Night Theatre	Squeen	Episode: "Miss Hargreaves"
1951	An Evening at Home with Bernard Braden and Barbara Kelly	Neighbour	Series regular
1953	Rheingold Theatre	George Bailey	Episode: "Take a Number"
1953	Vice Versa	Paul Bultditude	Mini-series
1955	Theatre Royal	George Perker	Episode: "Bardell vs. Pickwick"
1956	Tracey and Me	Mr. Crudnick	Mini-series
1956	BBC Sunday Night Theatre	Percy Middling	Episode: "Mrs. Moonlight"
1957	BBC Sunday Night Theatre	Sidney Satterthwaite	Episode: "Mayors' Nest"
1957	BBC Sunday Night Theatre	Teddy Brewster	Episode: "Arsenic and Old Lace"
1957	BBC Sunday Night Theatre	Captain Wallcott	Episode: "The Mulberry Bush"
1957	The Adventures of Robin Hood	Sir Cedric Hayworth	Episode: "The Secret Pool"
1957	Dick and the Duchess	Beasley	Episode: "The Armoured Car"
1957	Theatre Night	Sibilot	Episode: "Nekrassov"
1957	ITV Playhouse	Dr. Frank Freeman	Episode: "The Sand Castle"
1957	ITV Playhouse	Mr. Samuel Pepys	Episode: "And So to Bed"
1958	Television Playwright	Man on Park Bench	Episode: "Call Me a Liar"
1958	Fair Game	The Reverend Summers	Episode: "Saint Asaph's School for Boys"
1958	Armchair Theatre	Mr. Prosser	Episode: "The One Who Came Back"
1958	Saturday Playhouse	Edward Carter	Episode: "The Fourth Wall"
1958	BBC Sunday Night Theatre	Medvedev, a Policeman	Episode: "The Lower Depths"
1958	The Adventures of William Tell	Conrad	Episode: "The Cuckoo"
1958	ITV Playhouse	Major Forrester	Episode: "Badger's Green"
1959	ITV Playhouse	Colonel Leonard Battersby	Episode: "Movement of Troops"
1959	The Life and Death of Sir John Falstaff	Bardolph	Series regular
1959	Theatre Night	Wellington Potts	Episode: "Caught Napping"
1960	Armchair Theatre	Arthur Hopkins	Episode: "Mr Nobody"
1960	Theatre 70	James Morris	Episode: "Full Circle"
1960	Tales from Dickens	Stiggins	Episode: "Sam Weller and his Father"
1961	Winning Widows		Episode: "New Husbands"
1961	No Hiding Place	Buzz Wilson	Episode: "Signals at Danger"
1961	ITV Play of the Week	Mr. Filby	Episode: "Ring of Truth"
1962	ITV Play of the Week	Gerardin	Episode: "Coach 7, Seat 15"
1962	Dixon of Dock Green	Monty Mellon	Episode: "Bells in My Ears"
1962	Saki	Peter Pigeoncote	Mini-series
1963	Zero One	Williams	Episode: "Deadly Angels"
1963	The Dickie Henderson Show		Episode: "The Stamp Collector"
1963	The Rag Trade		Episode: "Baby Dolls"
1963	Tales of Mystery	Petershin	Episode: "Petershin and Mr. Snide"
1963	Drama 61-67	Mr. Lott	Episode: "The Lady and the Clerk"
1963	No Hiding Place	Major Binns	Episode: "Deadline for Dummy"
1964	Comedy Playhouse	Mr. Wilkes	Episode: "The Siege of Sydney's Street"
1964	The Avengers	Reverend Whyper	Episode: "Mandrake"
1964	Detective	Silas Hickler	Episode: "The Case of Oscar Brodski"
1965	The Man in Room 17	Marcus Oliver	Episode: "The Bequest"
1965	Danger Man	Police Chief	Episode: "Have a Glass of Wine"
1965	The Wednesday Thriller	The Man	Episode: "The Regulator"
1965	Out of the Unknown	Arnold Potterley	Episode: "The Dead Past"
1966	David Copperfield	Richard 'Mr. Dick' Babley	Series regular
1966	Walter and Connie Reporting	Mr. Turner	Episode: "The New Lock"
1967	Adam Adamant Lives!	Timothy Henshaw	Episode: "Death Begins at Seventy"
1967	Before the Fringe		1 episode
1967	The Forsyte Saga	Marquess of Shropshire	Recurring role
1967	The Prisoner	Labour Exchange Manager	Episode: "Free for All"
1968	Half Hour Story	Shillinghurst	Episode: "Natural Justice"
1968	The Mock Doctor	Valere	Recurring role
1968	The World of Beachcomber		Recurring role
1968	The Root of All Evil?	Dick	Episode:"The Fireplace Firm"
1968	Journey to the Unknown	The Vicar	Episode: "Paper Dolls"
1969	The Canterbury Tales	Chaplain	Episode: "The Canon Yeoman's Tale/The Franklin's Tale"
1970	The Misfit	Henry	Episode: "On Being British"
1970	Albert and Victoria	Dr. Martin	Episode: "The Secret of the Attic"
1970	Here Come the Double Deckers	Caterpillar	Episode: "Scooper Strikes Out"
1970	The Goodies	The Vicar	Episode: "The Greenies"
1970-1971	Jackanory	Storyteller	Series regular
1971	The Last of the Baskets	Mr. Smithers	Episode: "I Gotta Horse"
1971	Kate	Dr. Naseby	Episode: "A Sort of Change"
1971	Misleading Cases	Mr. Lazenby	Episode: "A Tiger in Your Bank"
1971	Now Take My Wife		Episode: "Claire's Demo"
1971	Casanova	Uncle	Mini-series
1972	Jason King	Gym Instructor	Episode: "If It's Got to Go - It's Got to Go"
1972	Six Days of Justice	Arnold Watson	Episode: "Suddenly... You're in It"
1973	Harriet's Back in Town	William Fryer	Series regular

== Sources ==
- Obituary of Mr George Benson, The Times, 21 June 1983 (pg. 12; Issue 61564; col G)
- George Benson at IMDb
- Who's Who in the Theatre, 16th edition, 1977
