= The Woman's Angle =

1952 British film by Leslie Arliss

- Directed by: Leslie Arliss
- Written by: Leslie Arliss; Mabbie Pool; Frederick Gotfurt
- Based on: Three Cups of Coffee by Ruth Feiner
- Produced by: Walter C. Mycroft
- Starring: Edward Underdown; Cathy O'Donnell; Lois Maxwell; Claude Farell
- Cinematography: Erwin Hillier
- Edited by: E.B. Jarvis
- Music by: Robert Gill (musical score); Louis Levy (musical director)
- Production company: Associated British Picture Corporation
- Distributed by: Associated British-Pathé
- Release date: February 1952 (U.K.)
- Running time: 86 minutes
- Country: United Kingdom
- Language: English
- Box office: £91,096 (UK)

The Woman's Angle is 1952 British drama film directed by Leslie Arliss and starring Edward Underdown, Cathy O'Donnell and Lois Maxwell. It was written by Arliss, Mabbie Pool and Frederick Gotfurt based on the 1940 novel Three Cups of Coffee by Ruth Feiner.

== Plot ==
The film is the story of three love affairs of a man who belongs to celebrated family of musicians, culminating in divorce and his final discovery of happiness.

== Cast ==
- Edward Underdown as Robert Mansell
- Cathy O'Donnell as Nina Van Rhyne
- Lois Maxwell as Enid Mansell
- Claude Farell as Delysia Veronova
- Peter Reynolds as Brian Mansell
- Marjorie Fielding as Mrs. Mansell
- Anthony Nicholls as Doctor Nigel Jarvis
- Isabel Dean as Isobel Mansell
- John Bentley as Renfro Mansell
- Olaf Pooley as Rudolph Mansell
- Ernest Thesiger as Judge
- Eric Pohlmann as Steffano
- Joan Collins as Marina
- Malcolm Knight as shepherd boy
- Fred Berger as restaurant manager
- Dana Wynter as Elaine
- Leslie Weston as Suttley
- Geoffrey Toone as Count Cambia
- Lea Seidl as Madame Kossoff
- Anton Diffring as peasant
- Miles Malleson as Arthur Secrett
- Peter Illing as Sergei
- Teddy Johnson as nightclub singer
- Sylva Langova as blonde in sleigh
- Bill Shine as Saunders
- Nora Gordon as guesthouse owner
- Wensley Pithey as Mr Witherspool
- Rufus Cruickshank as the Scot
- Fred Griffiths as cockney at bus stop

== Production ==
Arliss had been a fan of the novel since he read it in 1944. Peter Reynods was under contract to Associated British at the time.

The film was financed by the Elstree Group a financing scheme that operated for British films made by Associated British Pictures Corporation in the early 1950s. Associated British would make movies with part of the fiance being provided by the National Film Finance Corporation.

== Critical reception ==
The Monthly Film Bulletin wrote: "As the title suggests, this is no more than the filming of a woman's magazine story, and has the traditional air of unreality. The ingredients – eccentric genius, misunderstandings, music, and a variety of settings – are put together without inspiration."

Kine Weekly wrote: "The picture, which pivots on the divorce court and is unfolded in flashback, is at times apt to take itself a little too seriously, but it nevertheless contains many touching and amusing moments, lightly spiced with sex. Edward Underdown is not too happily cast as the susceptible Robert, but Lois Maxwell, Claude Farell and Cathy O'Donnel have very definite personalities and register in contrast as Enid, Delsya and Nina respectively. Pleasing musical accompaniment, which includes an original concerto, completes the engaging oracle."

Picturegoer wrote: "Hardly an edifying story, it's true, but the witty sophistication and gaiety with which it is decked out make it an amusing piece with occasional moments of enchantment. Leslie Arliss' direction, helped by some brittle dialogue, slithers skilfully over some very thin ice."

In British Sound Films: The Studio Years 1928–1959 David Quinlan rated the film as "mediocre", writing: "Arliss still making films to a Gainsborough formula that no longer works; novelettish stuff."

In The New York Times, Bosley Crowther thought the film "a grim little sample of bad writing, bad acting and bad directing all around."
