= The Man from Toronto =

The Man from Toronto may refer to:

- The Man from Toronto (1933 film), a British romantic comedy film directed by Sinclair Hill
- The Man from Toronto (2022 film), an American action comedy film directed by Patrick Hughes
