= Rhodes of Africa =

- Directed by: Berthold Viertel
- Written by: Leslie Arliss; Michael Barringer
- Based on: Rhodes by Sarah Millin
- Produced by: Geoffrey Barkas
- Starring: Walter Huston; Oskar Homolka; Basil Sydney
- Narrated by: Leo Genn
- Cinematography: S.R. Bonnett; Bernard Knowles
- Edited by: Derek Twist
- Music by: Hubert Bath
- Distributed by: Gaumont British Distributors
- Release date: February 1936
- Running time: 91 minutes
- Country: United Kingdom
- Language: English
- Budget: more than £100,000

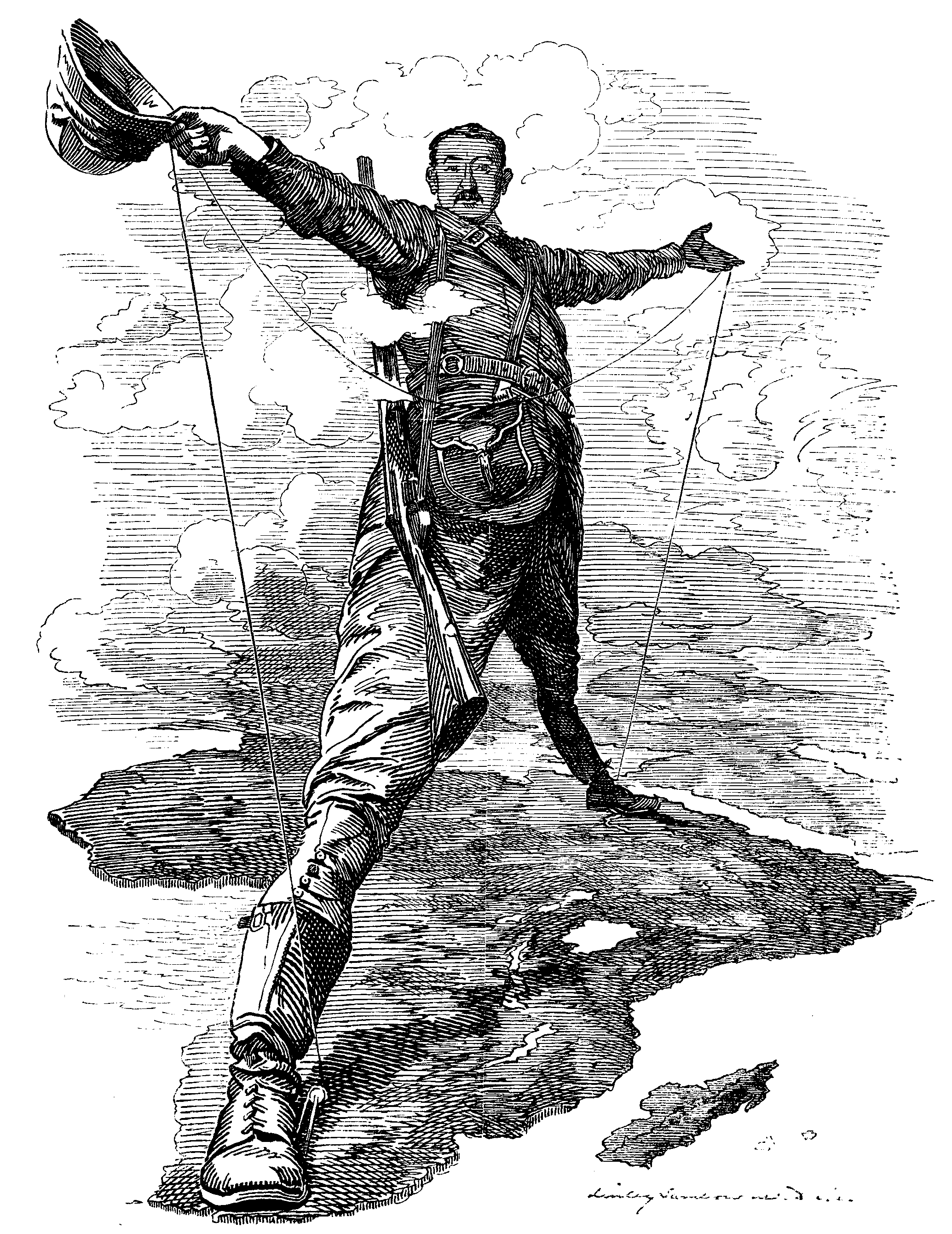
A caricature presenting Rhodes's life goal "From Cape to Cairo"

Rhodes of Africa is a 1936 British biographical film charting the life of Cecil Rhodes. It was directed by Berthold Viertel and starred Walter Huston, Oskar Homolka, Basil Sydney, and Bernard Lee.

== Plot ==
The movie begins with the captions: "The life of Cecil Rhodes is a drama of the man who set out single-handed to unite a continent. In the pursuit of this task, he spared neither himself nor others. By some he was hailed as an inspired leader, by others he was reviled as an ambitious adventurer. But to the Matabele--the very people he had conquered--he was a Royal Warrior, who tempered conquest with the gift of ruling. At his death, they gave to him, alone of white men before or since, their Royal Salute Bayete! Perhaps these children of Africa came closest to understanding the heart of this extraordinary man" which explain that there is controversy about Cecil Rhodes: whether he was a hero and an inspirational figure, or ambitious adventurer.

The film opens with an explanation of what South Africa's map looked like in the year 1870. After the explanation the film shows a family in the Cape Colony that have found a diamond. Following this, a complete diamond rush began. Then, Rhodes made his first appearance on the film, in the Kimberley Club. There, he meets his opponent who plans to buy all the Kimberley mines, and Rhodes says that is also what he plans to do. Then he goes to the doctor, who tells him he only has six more years to live. After they talk, the doctor claims that Rhodes has a desire to live, which is better than any medicine he can give.

Ten years later, his doctor says that he doesn't believe it, and congratulates Rhodes for managing to purchase all the mines in Kimberly. Then, he says, ten years ago, he only gave him six more years to live, and Rhodes said he had not even a spare moment to think about it ever since. After they had a little chat, Rhodes's opponent came in and said he did not understand how Rhodes managed to win; Rhodes explained to him that his employees spied on him, gave Rhodes all the inside info, and that is why Rhodes managed to win. After Rhodes's opponent gets less mad, Rhodes said he wants to invite him to work for his company.

Rhodes shows the map of Africa to his employees at British South Africa Company, explaining that north of where they are, the Transvaal Republic has rich gold mines, and that this poor country is no longer poor. These mines are not available to them, but in the land north from Transvaal, who knows what they will find, gold, copper, coal, fertile land for agriculture. He explained that the diamonds they found could be over, so he had to expand. At first there was resistance, but then he was able to persuade them.

The Transvaal President, his mother, and his friend - Henry talking about Rhodes with a woman who came to visit them. They are aware that Rhodes is planning to meet Lobengula, and Kroger (the Transvaal president) tells Henry that he must get there first and warn Lobengula. As Rhodes enters into the borders of the land of Lobengula, many local people surround him, bringing him to their king. At first, Lobengula is angry that all the white men who come to this country want something from him, saying that if he could have gotten rid of every one of them, he would have done it. His soldiers start aiming their javelins at him, but then Rhodes said he wants to talk to the king, and they took down the javelins. Rhodes told king Lobengula will not be able to get any rest from all the white people who come to bother him unless he makes a deal with one such person strong enough to protect him. After a little persuasion, he shows him a contract and Lobengula signs it.

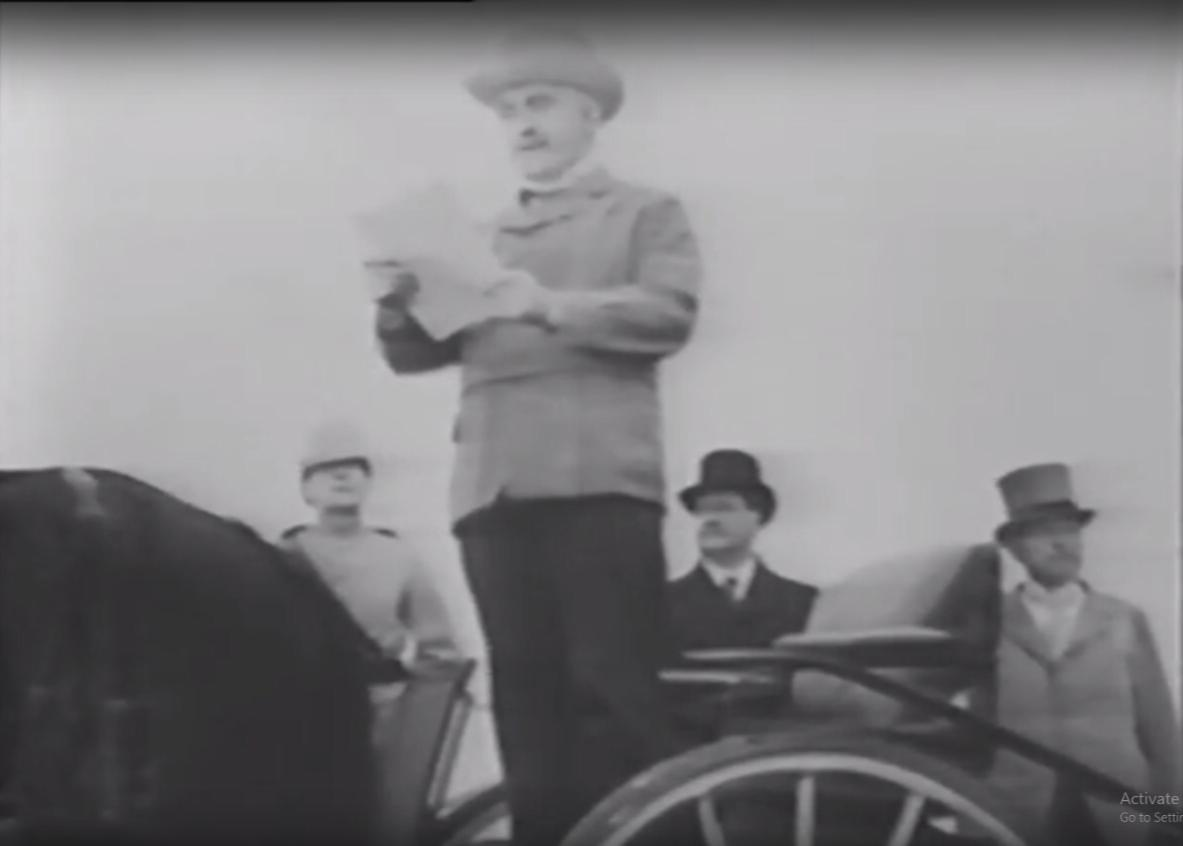
A speech before the diamond rush in the colony of the Cape of Good Hopes, South Africa

A few days later, Rhodes arrives to the house of the president of the Boers, informing him that he has managed to obtain the land of Lobengula. He says the two strongest countries in Africa need to work together, otherwise there will be war. Krueger says that if there was a war it would be the fault of the English and not his fault. Rhodes says it doesn't matter who it is, because if there is a war, it will destroy what Rhodes built and what Kruger built. Kruger refuses, saying they will not fight and will not work together.

Two doctors who talk about Rhodes' dire health, and say it's a tragedy, an entire country named after him, he just returned from London where they received him as king, and he has heart problems. The other doctor says it is a miracle that not much happened before the sea before and that only his ideology could keep him alive so much.

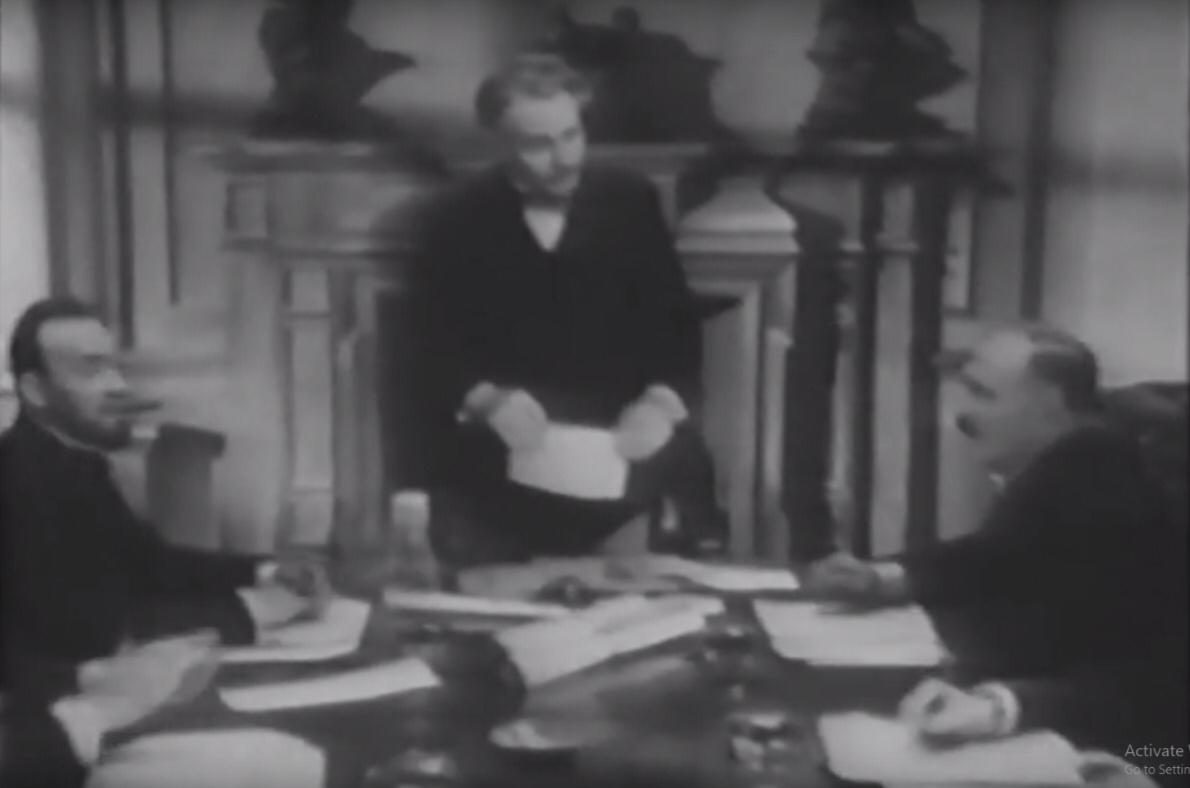
Rhodes talking to the employees the British South African Company

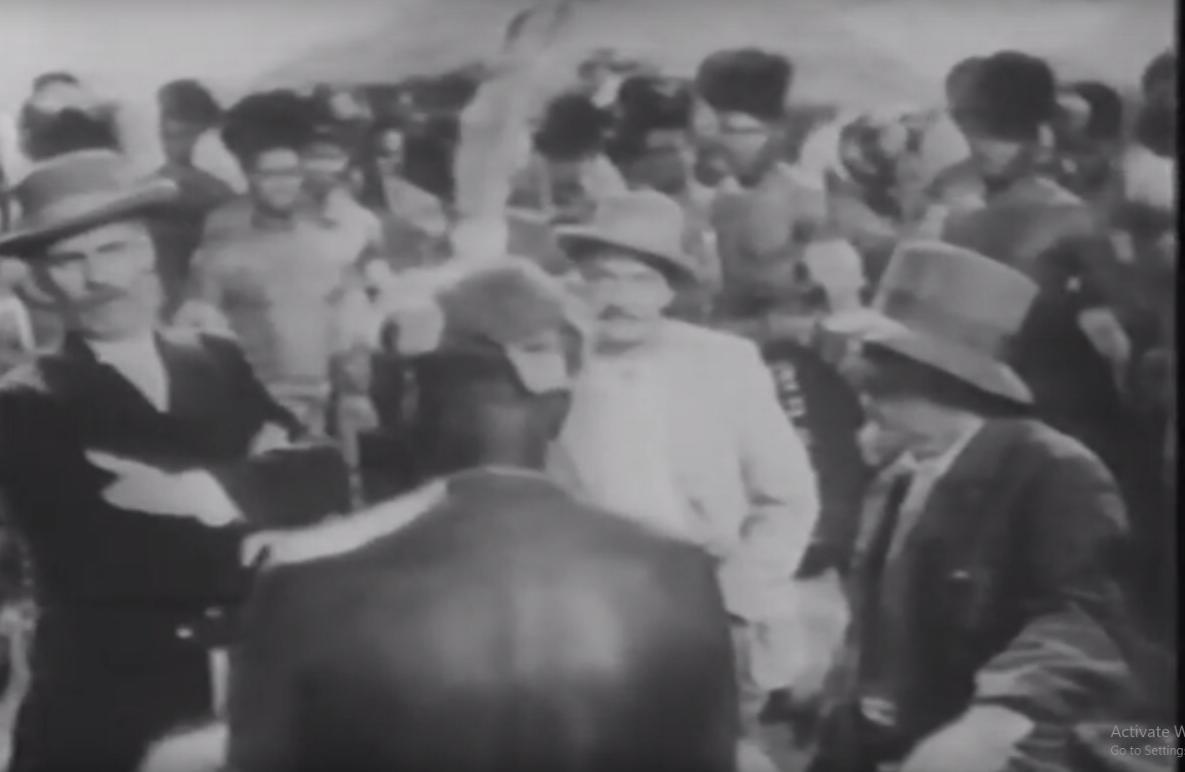
Rhodes talking to Lobengula

Some people were complaining to Kruger, telling him that he called people from all over the world to come and develop his country, and in response to his outcry they came. All of Johannesburg was built from their own money, but his laws give them fewer rights. The police only protects only the Boers and not them. Their fields were attacked by an epidemic, and they couldn't save their crops because according to Kruger, an epidemic in those fields is a punishment from the sky. Paul Kruger refuses to listen to them, so they decide to take a train south, to Cape Town, to Rhodes. At first, they told that they cannot say one thing in Southern Africa that Rhodes did not improve and they ask him, as Cape Colony's prime minister, and the director of the British South African company, and ask him to send troops to protect them. They say they will get rights and freedom, and that Rhodes will get a united South Africa. He collapses, and his doctors bring him to rest, telling people from Transvaal that soon he will be fine and that he can talk to them. At the house of the Transvaal president, some people came over him and said they refused to come out before he realized what was really going on. He says they stopped a truck full of oil tanks – all the containers were full of ammunition. They are trying to get him to give the signal, to start fighting, and he says they should be given time.

At the border between British South African colonies, and Transvaal, the soldiers of the British South African Company's army were already impatient. They send a letter to Rhodes asking that they leave as soon as possible. Rhodes says this to people who came to ask for help in their revolt, but they say they're not ready yet. When Rhodes heard that the Boer forces had captured the British forces he had sent to the border, he went straight to Jonasburg, to meet Kruger to ask for them to be released. Kruger initially refused, but then Rhodes claims he is no longer Cape Colony's prime minister, or the director of the British South African company – he resigned both jobs. He can no longer disturb Kroger and asks him to release the soldiers he kidnapped.

And then, the following text appears: "A few years later the clash came which Rhodes had foreseen-The Boer War. Out of this struggle rose the triumph of his life's ideal-The Union of South Africa. But Rhodes couldn't live to see it's fulfilment". The text explains that the Second Boer War has begun, but Rhodes didn't live to see the end of the war. The movie ends with a scene where they show Rhodes dying, and then his dead body is brought to Rhodesia, and the native tribes gave him their royal salute.

== Cast ==
Character	Actor
Cecil Rhodes	Walter Huston
Johannes Paul Kruger	Oskar Homolka
Dr Jim Jameson	Basil Sydney
Barney Barnato	Frank Cellier
Ann Carpenter, the writer	Peggy Ashcroft
Mrs Kruger	Renee de Vaux
Cartwright	Bernard Lee
Reverend Charles Helm	Lewis Casson
Lobengula	Kumalo Of Matabeleland, Ndanisa
fiancée	Glennis Lorimer
man from Transvaal	Felix Aylmer
Sara	Diana De Vaux
cast member	Ernest Jay
cast member	Julien Mitchell
Film director	Berthold Viertel
Director (Southern Africa Exteriors)	Geoffrey Barkas
Production Company	Gaumont-British
Film adaptation	Leslie Arliss
Adaption	Michael Barrington
Dialogue	Michael Barrington
Based on the book 'Rhodes' by	Sarah Gertrude Millin
Director of Photography (In Studio)	Bernard Knowles
Director of Photography (in S Africa)	S.R. Bonnett
Camera Assistant	Gerry Massey-Collier
Editor	D.N. Twist
Art Director	Werndorff, O.
Wardrobe	Strassner, J.
Music Director	Louis Levy
Recorder	A.F. Birch
Recorder	Dorte, F.H.

Blue Ensign of the British South Africa Company

British South Africa Company Lion

== Production ==
The film was the idea of South African novelist Sara Millin, who pitched the idea of a film of Rhodes' life to Michael Balcon. Plans to make the movie were abandoned when General Smuts expressed opposition to the project. However he changed his mind after he read a copy of the script. Leslie Banks, Clive Brook, Cedric Hardwicke and Brian Aherne were all discussed for the lead before Walter Huston was cast.

The movie was a series of imperial epics with Hollywood stars made by Gaumont British around this time, others including The Flying Doctor and The Tunnel.

Michael Balcon said he gave the job of directing to an Austrian because he did "not want the flag waved at all. The patriotism must be implicit, not- paraded. Our first aim is to produce entertainment, and if in doing so it reflects credit on British Government and arms then naturally weare pleased, but propaganda— well nothing is further, from our thoughts."

=== Filming ===
Filming took place on location in Southern Rhodesia in 1935 with studio scenes shot in London.

=== Score ===
The movie soundtrack was composed by Hubert Buth. Hubert was a British film composer and a music director. The composition and recordings were directed by Louis Levy. Levy was a film composer and a music director.

== Reception ==
=== Critical ===
Writing for The Spectator in 1936, Graham Greene gave the film a good review. Describing the film as "sober, worthy, [and] humourless", Greene observed that the tone of the biographical film was one of modern Liberalism, both "more charitable" and "with the anarchistic point of view of a man who never makes a moral condemnation". Greene also mentioned that "after ten days [he could] remember very little of this film but a sense of gentle titillation".

The film was criticised by fascists in Holland due to being seen as neglecting the contribution of Boers.

== Awards and honours ==
The movie is considered the eighth best movie of the year 1936. Oskar Homolka won eighth best performance of the year for his portrayal of Paul Kruger in Rhodes. Walter Huston won sixth best performance of the year for his portrayal of Cecil Rhodes.

== See also ==
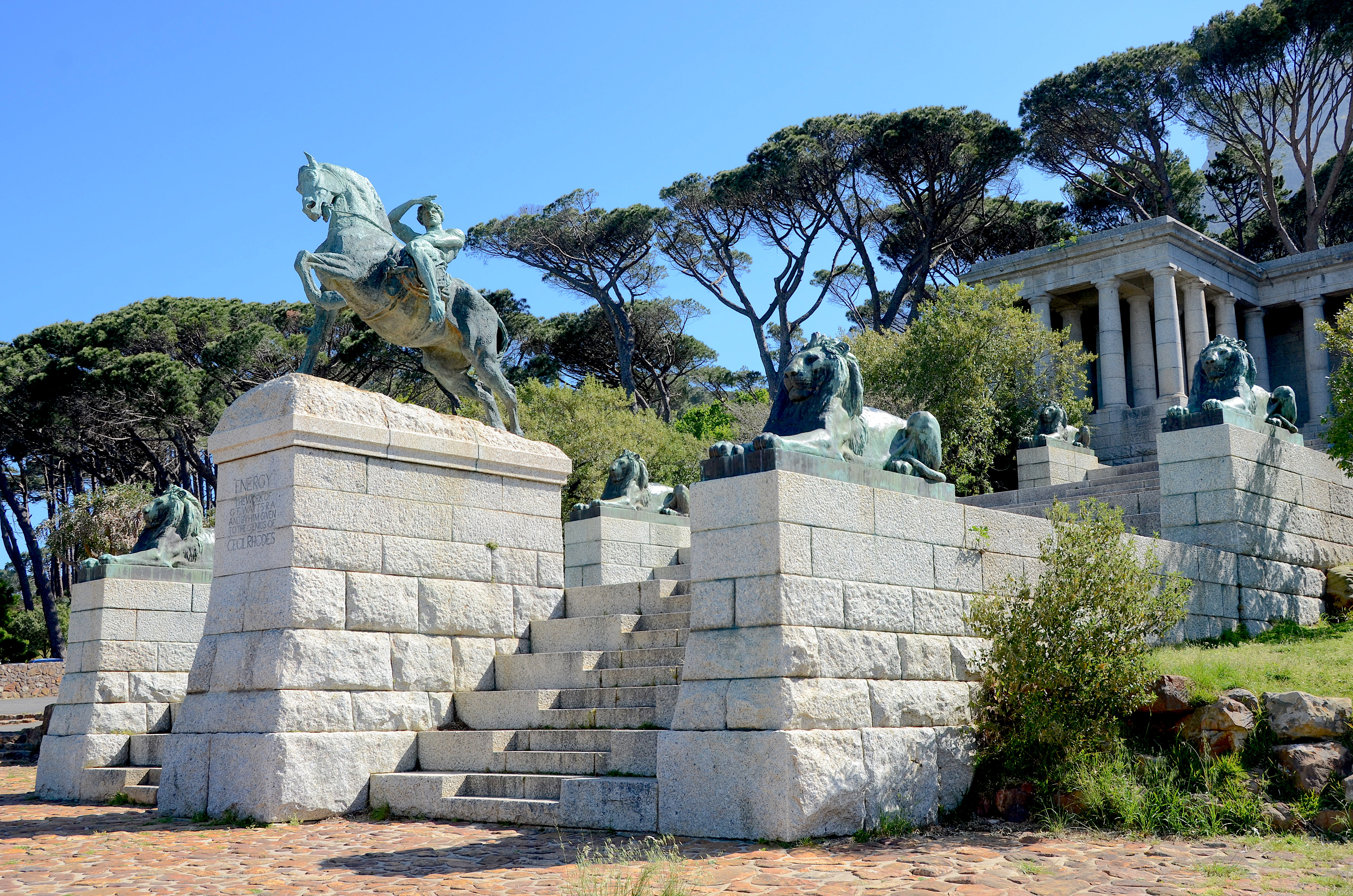
Rhodes memorial, Cape Town, South Africa

- British Empire
- Cape Colony
- Cecil Rhodes
- Colonialism
- Colony of Natal
- Company rule in Rhodesia
- Dr. Jim Jameson
- Northern Rhodesia
- Orange Free State
- Paul Kruger
- Post U.D.I. Rhodesia
- Transvaal Colony
- South African Republic (Transvaal Republic)
- Scramble for Africa
- Southern Rhodesia
- Union of South Africa

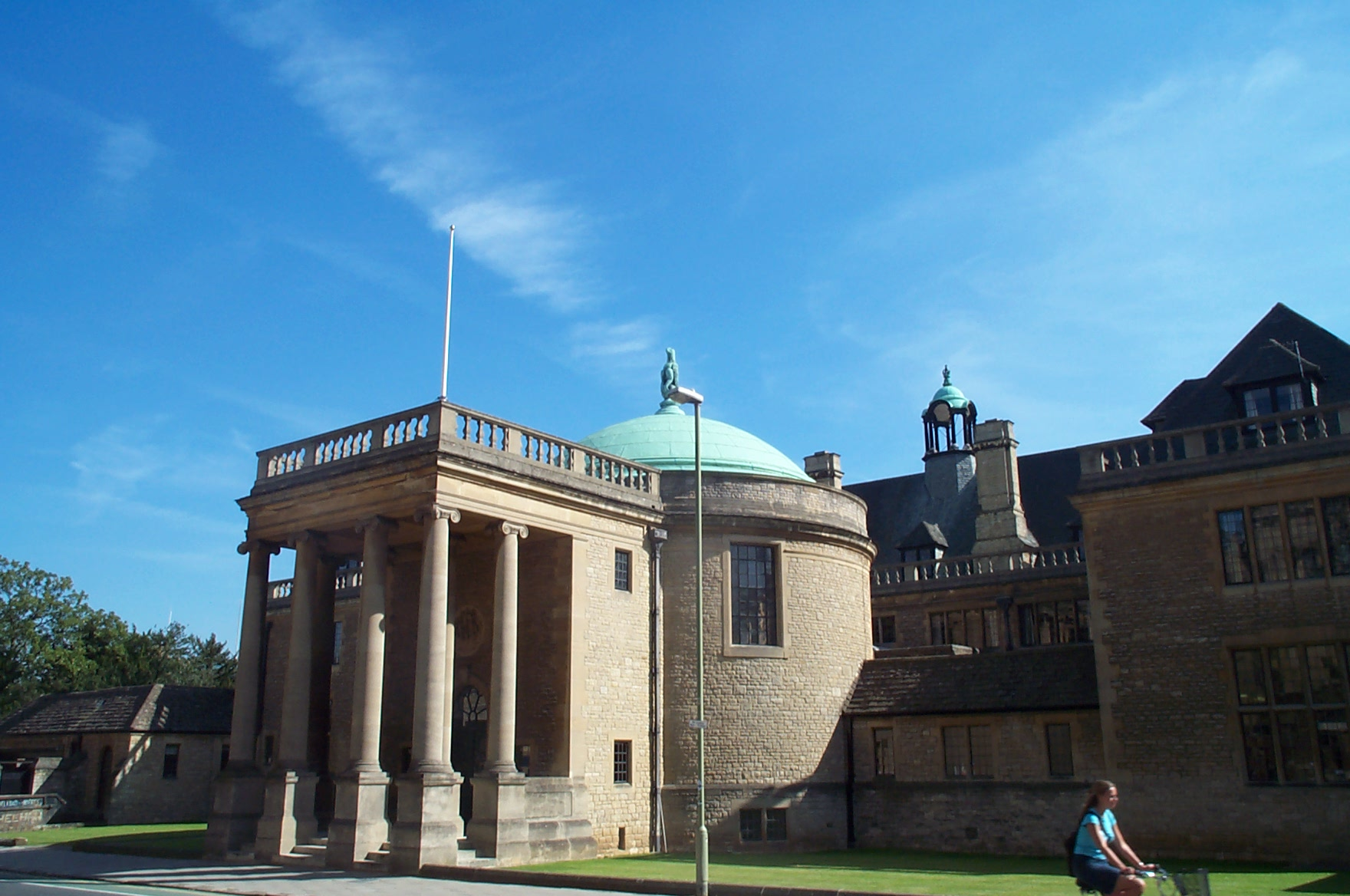
Rhodes House, Oxford University
