= The Man from Toronto (1933 film) =

1933 film

- British trade ad
- Directed by: Sinclair Hill
- Screenplay by: W. P. Lipscomb
- Based on: play The Man from Toronto by Douglas Murray
- Produced by: Michael Balcon
- Starring: Jessie Matthews; Ian Hunter; Frederick Kerr
- Cinematography: Leslie Rowson
- Edited by: R. E. Dearing
- Music by: Louis Levy
- Production company: Gainsborough Pictures
- Distributed by: Ideal Films (UK)
- Release date: January 1933
- Running time: 77 minutes
- Country: United Kingdom
- Language: English

The Man from Toronto is a 1933 British romantic comedy film directed by Sinclair Hill and starring Jessie Matthews, Ian Hunter and Frederick Kerr. It was written by W.P. Lipscomb based on the 1919 play of the same title by Douglas Murray. After an inheritance is left to them if they marry, an Englishwoman and a Canadian must meet for the first time to investigate the other – with comedic results.

The film was re-released in 1945.

== Plot ==
Lawyer Bunston informs Englishwoman Leslie Farrar, his niece by marriage, that she will inherit a quarter of a million if she marries Canadian Fergus Wimbush. The trouble is, they have never met. Leslie is furious, certain that the deceased made the will to get back at her for not marrying him by pressuring her to wed his nephew. When Leslie refuses to comply with the condition, Bunston lets Mrs. Hubbard's cottage to Leslie, as she must cut down on her expenses. When the man from Toronto comes to England, Leslie poses as a parlour maid in order to better make his acquaintance, and the two fall in love anyway. When he finally discovers her real identity, he is furious and refuses to marry her, but she persuades him to change his mind.

== Cast ==
- Jessie Matthews as Leslie Farrar
- Ian Hunter as Fergus Wimbush
- Frederick Kerr as Bunston (as Fred Kerr)
- Margaret Yarde as Mrs. Hubbard
- Percy Parsons as Hogbin
- Kenneth Kove as vicar
- Ben Field as Jonathan
- Kathleen Harrison as Martha
- Bill Shine as butcher's delivery boy (as Billy Shine)
- George Turner as Povey
- Herbert Lomas as Jake
- Laurence Hanray as Duncan
- Sybil Grove as vicar's wife
- George Zucco as Squire
- George Benson as villager (uncredited)
- Cyril Smith as gossiping villager (uncredited)

== Production ==
Production began in July 1932. The film was shot at Islington Studios and on location at Amberley in Sussex. The film's art direction was by Alex Vetchinsky.

== Critical reception ==
Kine Weekly wrote: "A simple, piquant, romantic comedy, adapted from the stage success, refreshingly English in its sentiments, humour, and picturesque countryside environment. There are no fireworks, but the picture nevertheless holds its audience and thoroughly entertains them through its clever characterisation – the types are excellent – its homely shrewd directorial touches, fine photography, and delightful atmosphere."

The Daily Film Renter wrote: "Jessie Matthews sets the seal on her previous screen work by turning in delightful performance, neatly blending high spirits, broad comedy and romance. Fred Kerr's testy lawyer portrayal is big hit. Magnificent shots of English countryside and picturesque cottage locale form principal backgrounds for mirth-provoking incidents which culminate in burlesque village pageant on elaborate lines. Sure fire attraction for any house."

TV Guide gave the film two out of five stars, calling it "A little charmer," and concluded that, "Kerr, as the lawyer, does his best to pair the two off and carries the weight of the picture while doing so."
