= Strip! Strip! Hooray!!! =

1932 film

- Opening titles
- Directed by: Norman Lee
- Written by: Leslie Arliss
- Starring: Ken Douglas; Betty Norton; Albert E.Raynor
- Cinematography: Bert Ford; Walter J. Harvey
- Edited by: Walter Stokvis
- Music by: Idris Lewis
- Production company: British International Pictures
- Distributed by: Pathé Pictures
- Release date: 28 June 1932
- Running time: 36 minutes
- Country: United Kingdom
- Language: English

Strip! Strip! Hooray!!! (also known as Strip! Strip! Hooray!!! Or (Fun with the Sunbathers), Fun with the Bathers and Fun with the Sunbathers) is a 1932 British short comedy film directed by Norman Lee and starring Ken Douglas, Betty Norton and Albert E. Raynor. It was written by Leslie Arliss and made by British International Pictures at Elstree Studios as a second feature.

== Premise ==
A specialist sunbathing camp is threatened by a campaign by the leader of the 'Wear More Clothes League'.

== Cast ==
- Ken Douglas as Benny Clements
- Betty Norton as Janet
- Albert E. Raynor as Sir Hector
- Muriel White as Snowdrop
- Hal Gordon as hoodlum
- June Seymour as dance band leader
- Binnie Barnes as Spanish lady
- Muriel Aked in a bit part
- Freddie Bartholomew as boy
- Charles Castella as Superintendent
- Eric Pavitt as boy
- Anita Sharp-Bolster in a bit part

== Reception ==
Kine Weekly wrote: "Comedy extravaganza, a popular type of leg show well sprinkled with breezy fun. The picture provides half-an hour's diversion and should make a useful supporting attraction for the masses. Ken Douglas patterns his performance on well-established music hall lines, but, nevertheless, scores the laughs, as Benny. Betty Norton is adequate as Janet, and the supporting players enter into the spirit of the entertainment with enthusiasm. This comedy, which is an excuse to exploit lightly clad damsels, is quite a useful effort as leg shows go, and is bolstered up with plenty of popular knockabout fooling. The fun is kept up at an even pace, and succeeds in whiling away half an hour. The sun-bathing sequences are well decked with lightly-clad girls. There is a little music and dancing and a bathing pool which allows for slapstick sequences."

Picturegoer wrote: "A comedy of very meagre idea which exists almost solely to exploit lightly clad women – in other words, a leg show. The legs are supported by knockabout fooling in sun-bathing and bathing-pool sequences, assisted by some music and dancing. Ken Douglas works on music-hall lines and scores his laughs from the dialogue and accepted medium of that class of entertainment rather than from any kinematic cleverness."

The Daily Film Renter wrote: "Skit on sun bathing cult approached from comedy angle with prim M.P. 'investigating' conditions in a sun colony in silk hat and bathing costume. Quantities of pretty girls bathing and dancing, and slender story of young couple blackmailing the investigating M.P. into permitting – and financing – their wedding. Treated rather in musical comedy vein, its appeal is to lighter-hearted patrons of not too captious a calibre."
