= Sarah Millin =

South African author (1889–1968)

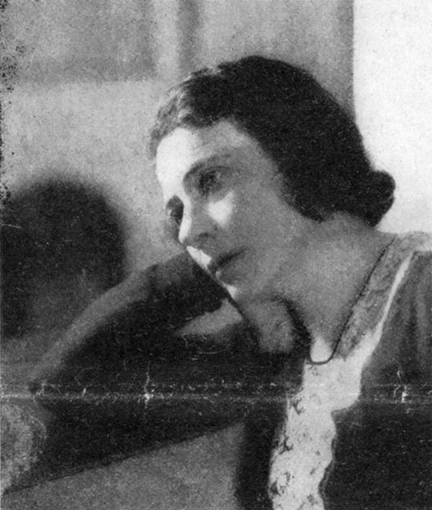
Sarah Millin, before 1931

Sarah Gertrude Millin (née Liebson} (19 March 1889 – 6 July 1968), was a South African author.

== Biography ==
Millin was born in Žagarė, Kovno Governorate on 19 March 1889. She was the eldest child and only daughter of Isaiah Liebson, a Jewish merchant, and his wife, Olga Friedmann. Five months later her parents, Isaiah and Olga, immigrated to Cape Colony and the family settled in Beaconsfield near Kimberley. In 1894, when she was six years old, they moved to the diamond diggings on the banks of the Vaal River in the Kimberley area where her father opened a trading store. This environment was to provide the setting for much of her future work that combined a love of the South African landscape with an abhorrence of the poverty and squalor in which most of the diggers lived. After matriculating at Kimberley High School for Girls in 1904 she chose not to take up the bursaries offered to her to attend the university at the South African College in Cape Town but instead studied music in Kimberley. She obtained a piano teacher's certificate but never practiced that career. From the age of six she had been convinced that writing was her destiny and had begun writing short stories at an early age. Some of her first compositions appeared in newspapers in the years 1910 to 1912.

On 1 December 1912 she married Philip Millin and they settled in Johannesburg. Philip, a lawyer who later became a judge of the Supreme Court, encouraged her literary ambitions. Philip Millin died of heart failure on the bench while she had just begun to write her autobiography The Measure of My Days, an event which affected her deeply.

She died in Johannesburg.

== Bibliography ==
=== Fiction ===
- The Dark River was first published in the United Kingdom (UK) by William Collins (publisher) Sons & Co., Ltd. in 1919, and in the US by Thomas Seltzer in 1920. Archibald Constable & Co. Ltd. reprinted The Dark River in 1928 under its Constable's Miscellany series.
- Middle Class was first published in the UK by W. Collins Sons & Co., Ltd. in 1921. It was not published in the US. Constable & Co. Ltd. reprinted Middle Class in 1928 under its Constable's Miscellany series.
- Adam's Rest was first published in the UK by W. Collins Sons & Co., Ltd. in 1922 and in the US by Horace Liveright in 1930. Constable & Co. Ltd. reprinted Adam's Rest in 1928 under its Constable's Miscellany series.
- The Jordans was first published in the UK by W. Collins Sons & Co., Ltd. in 1923 in the US by Horace Liveright in the same year as the Collins edition. Constable & Co. Ltd. reprinted The Jordans in 1928 under its Constable's Miscellany series.
- God's Stepchildren was published in 1924 by Constable & Co. Ltd. in the UK and by Boni & Liveright in the US. It proved to be Millin's greatest success. Particularly, the US release enjoyed numerous printings, and Grosset & Dunlap also reprinted God's Stepchildren.
- Mary Glenn was published in 1925 by Constable & Co. Ltd. in the UK and by Boni & Liveright in the US. Grosset & Dunlap reprinted it, and Mary Glenn was also adapted as a play, being first produced retitled "No Longer Mourn in London, England, at the Gate Theatre, in 1935.

The Coming of the Lord

- The Coming of the Lord was published in 1928 by Constable & Co. Ltd. in the UK, by Macmillan in Canada, and by Horace Liveright in the US. It was reprinted by Grosset & Dunlap.
- An Artist in the Family was also published in 1928. Constable & Co. Ltd. served the UK market, Macmillan the Canadian market, and Boni & Liveright the US market.
- The Fiddler was published in 1929 by Constable & Co. Ltd. in the UK and by Horace Liveright in the US.
- The Sons of Mrs Aab was published in 1931 in the UK by Chatto & Windus and in the US by Boni & Liveright.
- Three Men Die was published in 1934 in the UK and the US by Chatto & Windus and Harper & Brothers, respectively. This novel is based upon the life of Daisy de Melker.
- What Hath a Man? was published in 1938 in the UK and the US by Chatto & Windus and Harper & Brothers, respectively.
- The Herr Witchdoctor was published in the UK by William Heinemann in 1941. In 1941 in the US it was published under the title The Dark Gods by Harper & Brothers. This novel of Nazis in South Africa is largely forgotten, but remains an excellent reference for students of South African history.
- The King of the Bastards is a novel of a small colored community in the Northern Transvaal, descendants of Coenraad Buys and his harem of native women. With a foreword by Jan Smuts, it was published in 1949 in the US by Harper & Brothers, and in 1950 in the UK by William Heinemann.
- The Burning Man, a sister novel running in parallel in time to The King of the Bastards, is the story of Johannes van der Kemp, military officer, doctor, and philosopher, who eventually became a missionary in South Africa. In 1952 William Heinemann published the novel in the UK while G.P. Putnam's Sons published it in the US.
- Two Bucks Without Hair & Other Stories was published in 1957 in the UK by Faber & Faber, in South Africa by Central News Agency, and in Rhodesia by Kingston's.
- The Wizard Bird was published in 1962 in the UK by William Heinemann, in South Africa by Central News Agency, and in Rhodesia by Kingston's.
- Goodbye, Dear England was Millin's last novel. It was published in 1965 in the UK by William Heinemann.

=== Non-fiction ===
The South Africans was Millin's first foray into non-fiction. It was published in the UK in 1926 by Constable & Co. Ltd, and in the US in 1927 by Boni & Liveright.

Men on a Voyage differs from anything else Millin ever produced. It consists of thoughts and essays on various subjects. Men on a Voyage was only released in the UK and the Commonwealth, and was published in 1930 by Constable & Co. Ltd.

Her biography of Cecil Rhodes is still considered to be an authoritative source of information on the diamond magnate's life. Chatto & Windus published Rhodes in 1933, and then a revised edition in 1952. Harper & Brothers released the work in the US in 1933 under the title Cecil Rhodes. Millin is credited as one of the contributors to the screenplay for the film Rhodes of Africa, which was released in 1936 and starred Walter Huston. To coincide with the release of Rhodes of Africa, Grosset & Dunlap reprinted this biography in the US under the title Cecil Rhodes, Empire Builder.

General Smuts is Millin's second biography. In 1936 it was published in two volumes. Faber & Faber served the UK market while Little, Brown and Company served the American market.

Millin contributed the chapter on South Africa contained in The British Commonwealth & Empire (nonfiction, W. Collins Sons & Co. Ltd., 1943)

The People of South Africa is an expansion of The South Africans of 1926. Constable & Co. Ltd published it in 1951 in the UK and Alfred A Knopf published it in America in 1954.

Millin acted as editor of White Africans are also people, published in 1966 in South Africa by Howard Timmons, and in the UK by Bailey Swinfen.

South Africa published by William Collins of London 1941, Editor W. J. Turner. a part of the Britain in Pictures series. 48 pages, illustrated 12 colour plates and 28 black and white illustrations. Produced by ADPRINT LONDON, Printed in Great Britain by Harrison & Sons Ltd. London. Printers to His Majesty the King.

=== Autobiography ===
- The Night is Long. Faber & Faber limited. 1941., Millin's first autobiography
- During World War II Millin wrote a six-volume diary published in the UK by Faber & Faber as World Blackout (1944); The Reeling Earth (1945); The Pit of the Abyss (1946); The Sound of the Trumpet (1947); Fire Out of Heaven (1947); and The Seven Thunders (1948).
- The Measure of My Days. Faber. 1955. is Millin's second autobiography, published in 1955 by Faber & Faber in the UK, Central News Agency in South Africa, and Kingston's in Rhodesia.
