= Holiday Lovers =

1932 film

- Directed by: Jack Harrison
- Screenplay by: Leslie Arliss
- Produced by: Harry Cohen
- Starring: Margery Pickard; George Vollaire; Pamela Carme; George Benson
- Cinematography: Horace Wheddon
- Production companies: Harry Cohen Productions; Fox Film British
- Distributed by: Fox Film Company
- Release date: 10 November 1932 (U.K.)
- Running time: 46 min
- Country: United Kingdom
- Language: English

Holiday Lovers is a 1932 romantic comedy film from the United Kingdom. It is written by notable screenwriter and director Leslie Arliss, directed by Jack Harrison and stars Margery Pickard, George Vollaire, Pamela Carme and George Benson in his debut role. Filming took place at Wembley Studios under the supervision of Hugh Perceval, the head of Fox productions U.K, with production design by J. Elder Wills. It is the first film of Harry Cohen Productions and marks the return of film making to Wembley Studios after a major fire.

When a man and woman of modest means meet on a Brighton pier they begin a holiday romance. However, when they each act rich to dupe the other, there are unintended consequences.

== Cast ==
- Margery Pickard
- George Vollaire
- Pamela Carme
- Boris Ranevsky
- George Benson as Oswald
- Wyn Weaver as Lord Winterton
- Vincent Holman as Salesman

== Release ==
"Holiday Lovers" premiered on 10 November 1932 at The Hippodrome, London in a Fox Film double bill with "Six Hours to Live", a U.S. science fiction thriller.

== Reception ==
In his review for The Era newspaper on 16 November 1932 Jack Payne wrote that Holiday Lovers "opens brightly but flops mid way. Naive story likely to cause some laughter in the wrong places."
