= Percy Parsons =

American actor (1878–1944)

- 1939 Spotlight photo
- Born: Edward Percy Parsons; 12 June 1878; Louisville, Kentucky, United States
- Died: 3 October 1944 (aged 66); Chelsea, London, England
- Occupations: Actor; singer
- Years active: 1906–1942
- Spouse: Natalie Lynn

Edward Percy Parsons (12 June 1878 – 3 October 1944) was an American actor and singer who worked largely in the British film industry.

== Selected filmography ==
- Suspense (1930)
- Beyond the Cities (1930)
- Creeping Shadows (1931)
- Strictly Business (1931)
- Happy Ever After (1932)
- Sleepless Nights (1932)
- The Man from Toronto (1933)
- This Is the Life (1933)
- Red Wagon (1933)
- Red Ensign (1934)
- Princess Charming (1934)
- My Heart Is Calling (1935)
- The Big Splash (1935)
- Rhodes of Africa (1936)
- The Gay Adventure (1936)
- Twelve Good Men (1936)
- Strangers on Honeymoon (1936)
- Victoria the Great (1937)
- The Song of the Road (1937)
- Non-Stop New York (1937)
- Said O'Reilly to McNab (1937)
- Blondes for Danger (1938)
- The Four Just Men (1939)
- Hi Gang! (1942)
- They Flew Alone (1942)
