= Insomnia Is Good for You =

1957 British short comedy film by Leslie Arliss

- Directed by: Leslie Arliss
- Screenplay by: Lewis Griefer; Mordecai Richler
- Produced by: Jules Simmons
- Starring: Peter Sellers
- Cinematography: J.M. Burgoyne-Johnson
- Edited by: Helen Wiggins
- Production company: Park Lane Films
- Release date: 1957
- Running time: 26 minutes
- Country: United Kingdom
- Language: English

Insomnia is Good for You is a 1957 British short second feature ('B') comedy film directed by Leslie Arliss and starring Peter Sellers. It was written by Lewis Griefer and Mordecai Richler and produced and released by Park Lane Films.

== Plot ==
Salesman Hector Dimwittie is unable to sleep during the weekend before a dreaded Monday meeting with his boss.

== Cast ==
- Peter Sellers as Hector Dimwittie

== Reception ==
The Monthly Film Bulletin wrote: "One of two recently issued comedies featuring a Peter Sellers character, Hector Dimwiddie [sic], ambiguously described as 'a normal, lazy married man'. In this film Dimwiddie is seen cultivating insomnia preparatory to an impending Monday morning interview with his boss. The increasingly frightful visions of the boss's temper and his uncertainty of the reasons for the interview produce a marathon sixty-two hours of sleeplessness. ... Despite an amusing and satirical opening and occasional bright moments later, most of the humour falls very flat, despite the talent and hard work of Peter Sellers. One short sequence, however, in which Dimwiddie demonstrates the various positions (all neatly labelled) an insomniac may adopt, is notable."

== Conservation status ==
As of December 2012, the film was considered lost by rare book and script collector and actor Neil Pearson, with no cast list (apart from Sellers), script or footage known to exist. Nevertheless, a copy had been found in 1996, in a skip outside the offices of the film company, together with Dearth of a Salesman (also 1957). It was shown at the Southend Film Festival in May 2014.
