= Leslie Arliss =

British film director (1901–1987)

- Born: London, England; 6 October 1901; London
- Died: 30 December 1987 (aged 86); Jersey, Channel Islands
- Occupations: screenwriter and film director

Leslie Arliss (6 October 1901 – 30 December 1987) was an English screenwriter and director. He is best known for his work on the Gainsborough melodramas directing films such as The Man in Grey and The Wicked Lady during the 1940s.

== Biography ==
=== Early life ===
His parents were Charles Sawforde Arliss and Annie Eleanor Lilian "Nina" Barnett Hill. He was not the son of George and Florence Arliss as has sometimes been reported erroneously.

Arliss began his professional career as a journalist in South Africa. Later he branched out into being a critic.

=== Screenwriter ===
During the 1920s, Arliss entered the film industry as a screenwriter, and author of short stories. He did some uncredited work on The Farmer's Wife (1928) directed by Alfred Hitchcock, then was credited on the comedies Tonight's the Night (1932), Strip! Strip! Hooray!!! (1932), Josser on the River (1932), The Innocents of Chicago (1932) and Holiday Lovers (1932).

Arliss joined Gaumont British to write Road House (1934), a crime film; Orders Is Orders (1934), a comedy; My Old Dutch (1934), a comedy; Jack Ahoy (1934), a Jack Hulbert vehicle. He was credited on Heat Wave (1935), and Windbag the Sailor (1936) with Will Hay.

Arliss' most prestigious credit to date was Rhodes of Africa (1936) starring Walter Huston, a job he got in part because of his South African background. It was back to more typical fare with All In (1936), a comedy; Everybody Dance (1936), a musical; Where There's a Will (1936) and Good Morning, Boys (1937) with Will Hay; and Said O'Reilly to McNab (1937) with Will Mahoney. Many of these were written for producer Ted Black.

In 1938 it was reported he was writing a script on Rob Roy for Gainsborough Studios but the film was not made. He worked in Hollywood in 1937 and 1938. He did some work for Sam Goldwyn and wrote an unfilmed story of Tchaikovsky.

Arliss wrote a crime film Too Dangerous to Live (1938) then did Come On George! (1939) with George Formby and The Second Mr. Bush (1940).

With World War II he began writing propaganda films: Pastor Hall (1940) for Roy Boulting; For Freedom (1940) with Will Fyffe; Bulldog Sees It Through (1941) with Jack Buchanan; and South American George (1941) with Formby. He also wrote The Saint Meets the Tiger (made 1941 released 1943) with Hugh Sinclair.

=== Director ===
The success of Noël Coward as a writer and director with In Which We Serve (1942) led to the British film industry encouraging writers to become directors.

In 1941 Arliss became a director, initially for Associated British, but soon changing to Gainsborough Pictures. He made his directorial debut with a remake of The Farmer's Wife (1941), co-directed by Norman Lee.

He worked on The Foreman Went to France (1942) for Ealing Studios as writer only and wrote and directed The Night Has Eyes (1942), a thriller, with James Mason.

=== Gainsborough Melodrama ===
Arliss had the biggest success of his career to date with The Man in Grey (1943), which he co-wrote and directed. It was one of the biggest hits of his career and made stars of its leads, Mason, Stewart Granger, Phyllis Calvert and Margaret Lockwood. Calvert later claimed Arliss was "not at all" responsible for the eventual success of the film, saying "He was a lazy director; he had got a wonderful job there and he just sat back... [producer] Ted Black was the one who would watch it, cut it, and know exactly what the audience would take." Calvert also said ""Arlissing about" became "a Gainsborough byword for slackness."

Arliss' next movie was also a huge hit. Love Story (1944), which he co-wrote and directed, starred Granger, Lockwood and Patricia Roc.

An even bigger success was The Wicked Lady (1945), which Arliss wrote and directed, starring Lockwood and Mason.

He was working on a film called Digger's Republic in 1945. It was later made without him as Diamond City (1948).

=== Alexander Korda ===
Arliss turned down Hollywood offers, but in March 1946 he accepted an offer to work for Alexander Korda. (Korda was on a talent-signing spree at the time, also doing contracts with Herbert Wilcox, Edward Black and Anthony Kimmins.) Arliss was put to work on Bonnie Prince Charlie (1948), although he eventually left the project. He directed A Man About the House (1947). Arliss directed Idol of Paris (1948) for Gainsborough's former production chief Maurice Ostrer, but the film was a notorious flop, as was Bonnie Prince Charlie when it was released.

He was meant to make an Egg and I style comedy with Kieron Moore for Korda, but instead he wrote and directed Saints and Sinners (1949), which also did poorly.

=== 1950s films ===
Arliss prepared a sequel to his greatest success, The Wicked Lady's Daughter, but it was not made. Instead he wrote and directed The Woman's Angle (1952), which was a commercial disappointment.

He directed some comedies, Miss Tulip Stays the Night (1955) and See How They Run (1955) (which he also wrote).

He did a number of short films in the mid/late 1950s, two of which, Dearth of a Salesman and Insomnia Is Good for You (both 1957), featured Peter Sellers. The films, long believed lost, were rediscovered around 2013.

He later directed several series of television programmes such as Douglas Fairbanks Jr. Presents (1954), Sailor of Fortune (1955) The Buccaneers (1956), The New Adventures of Charlie Chan (1957–58), The Invisible Man (1958) and The Forest Rangers (1963).

=== Final Years ===
Arliss died in his home on the English Channel Island of Jersey.

In 1928 he married Dorothy Gordon Cumming (died 1986). His survivors include a daughter.

== Films as screenwriter ==
- The Farmer's Wife – 1928 (uncredited)
- Tonight's the Night – 1932
- Strip! Strip! Hooray!!! – 1932 (short : also lyricist for songs)
- Josser on the River – 1933
- The Innocents of Chicago – 1932
- Holiday Lovers – 1932
- Road House – 1934
- Orders is Orders – 1934
- My Old Dutch -1934
- Jack Ahoy – 1934
- Heat Wave – 1935
- Windbag the Sailor – 1936
- Rhodes of Africa – 1936
- All In – 1936
- Everybody Dance – 1936
- Where There's a Will – 1936 (story)
- Good Morning, Boys – 1937
- Said O'Reilly to McNab – 1937
- Too Dangerous to Live – 1939
- Come on George! – 1939
- The Second Mr. Bush – 1940
- Pastor Hall – 1940
- For Freedom – 1940
- Bulldog Sees it Through – 1940
- South American George – 1941
- The Foreman Went to France – 1942
- The Saint Meets the Tiger – 1943
- Top of the Form – 1953
- The Wicked Lady – 1983

== Films as director and screenwriter ==
- The Farmer's Wife – 1941
- The Night Has Eyes – 1942
- The Man in Grey – 1943
- Love Story – 1944
- The Wicked Lady – 1945
- A Man About the House – 1947
- Idol of Paris – 1948 (Director only)
- Saints and Sinners – 1949 (also Producer)
- The Woman's Angle (1952)
- Miss Tulip Stays the Night – 1955
- See How They Run – 1955

== Films as director ==
- Man with a Dog (short) (1957)
- Dearth of a Salesman (short) (1957)
- Insomnia Is Good for You (short) (1957)
- Danger List (short) (1959)

== Television ==
- The New Adventures of Charlie Chan (1957) – directed 15 episodes
- Sailor of Fortune (1955–1956) – directed 3 episodes
- The Buccaneers (1956–1957) – directed 9 episodes
- The Invisible Man (1958) – wrote or co-wrote 4 episodes
