= Les Allen (musician) =

Canadian musician (1902–1996)

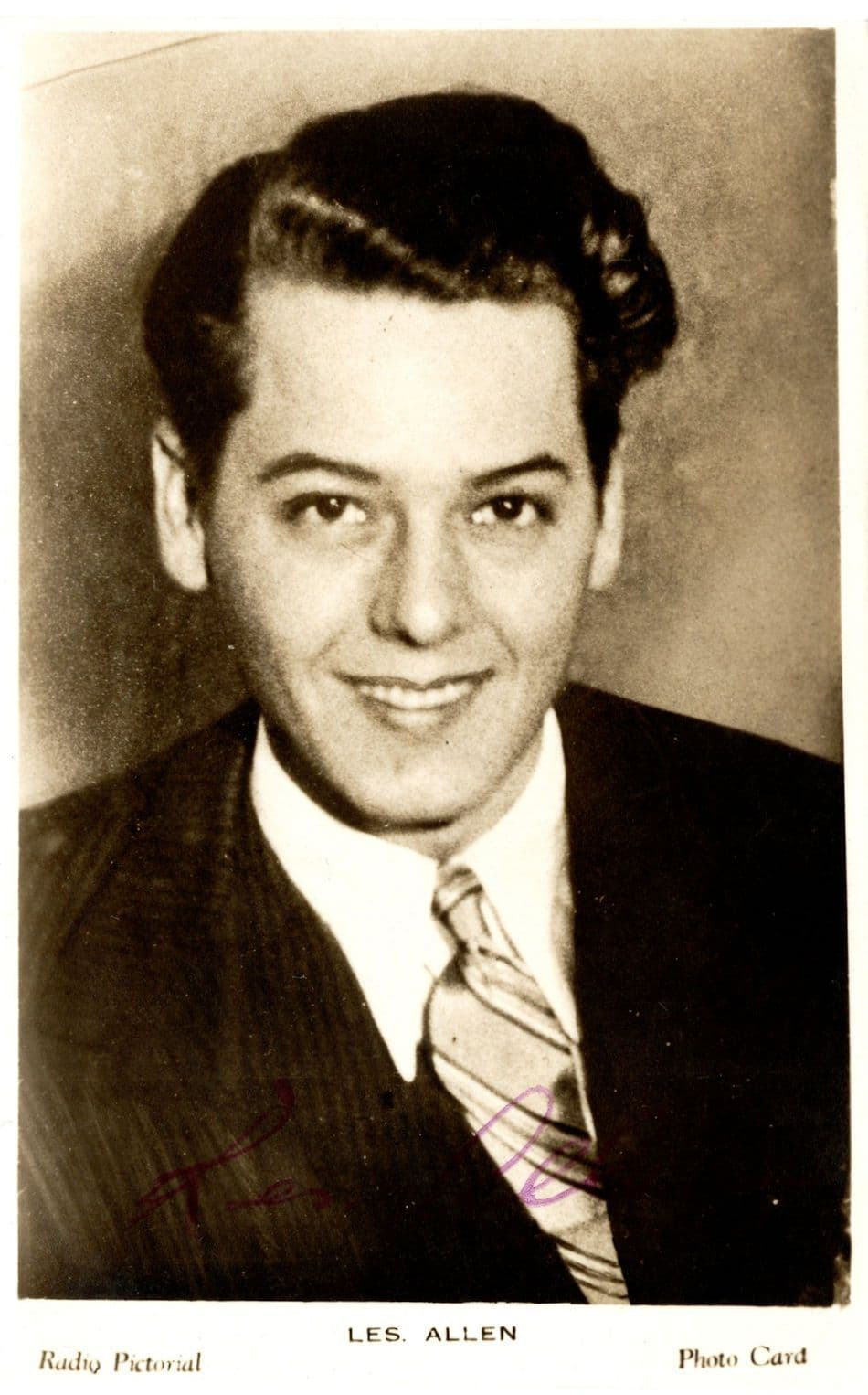
- Les Allen on a Radio Pictorial photo card

Background information
- Born: Leslie Allen; 29 August 1902; London, England
- Died: 25 June 1996 (aged 93) Toronto, Ontario, Canada
- Genres: Big Band, jazz
- Occupations: Musician, Singer
- Instruments: Tenor saxophone, clarinet
- Years active: 1920–1950s

Leslie Allen (29 August 1902 – 25 June 1996) was a Canadian saxophonist and vocalist popular in Britain during the 1930s.

== Life ==
Allen was born in Ealing, London; at age 3, he and his family moved to Canada. As a child, he played clarinet alongside his father in the Queen's Own Rifles Band and later learned to play the saxophone. Allen performed with the dance bands of Burton Till and Luigi Romanelli and in 1922 worked briefly in New York before travelling to England in 1924 as part of a band of fellow Canadians recruited by Hal Swain.

Swain had intended his band to play at the Rector's Club in London, but found it closed. Luckily, the band found work as the resident band at the New Prince's restaurant in Piccadilly and took on the name 'The New Princes' Toronto Band'. Under this name, they recorded for Columbia for eighteen months with Allen serving as alto-saxophonist and occasional vocalist. Between 1926 and 1927, Allen joined several of his NPTB colleagues on a European tour where they performed as 'Dave Caplin's Toronto Band' under the leadership of banjoist Caplin.

After returning to England in 1927, Allen spent the next five years playing and singing with several leading British dance orchestras (including those of Carroll Gibbons, George Melachrino and Geraldo) and making a number of freelance recording (including duets with Al Bowlly). In 1932, he joined Henry Hall's BBC Dance Orchestra as a featured vocalist and enjoyed national hits with 'The Sun Has Got His Hat On' and 'Auf Wiedersehen, My Dear'. Allen parted ways with Hall in 1934 and began a career as a solo act, scoring hits with 'Tell Me Tonight', 'Love Is The Sweetest Thing' and the children's ballad, 'Little Man You've Had A Busy Day' on which his wife, Anne and son, Norman had speaking parts. In 1935, he starred in the musical comedy ‘Heat Wave’. Subsequently, Allen formed his own bands, the Les Allen Melody Four and the male voice singing group, Les Allen & His Canadian Bachelors, with fellow countrymen Jack Curtis (lead), Herbie King (tenor), and Cy Mack (baritone and arranger).

During the Second World War, Allen travelled and entertained Canadian troops. After the war, he played the juvenile lead in the 1945 revival of "Miss Hook of Holland" before returning to Toronto in 1948, where he started a second career in the office supply trade, retiring in 1971. He died in Toronto in 1996 at the age of 93.

Allen's nephew, Singer-accordionist Eddie Allen, was a member of The Happy Gang from 1938 to 1959.
