= Alex Vetchinsky =

British film designer (1904–1980)

- Born: Alec Hyman Vetchinsky; 9 November 1904; London, England; United Kingdom
- Died: 4 March 1980 (aged 75); Hove, East Sussex; United Kingdom
- Occupation: Art director
- Years active: 1928–1974

Alex Vetchinsky (né Alec Hyman Vetchinsky; 9 November 1904 – 4 March 1980) was a BAFTA nominated British film art director and production designer. He worked on more than a hundred productions during a career that lasted between 1928 and 1974. Vetchinsky was employed for many years at Gainsborough Pictures. He later worked frequently for Rank, including on several Carry On films.

== Selected filmography ==
- Balaclava (1928)
- Symphony in Two Flats (1930)
- Sunshine Susie (1931)
- The Faithful Heart (1932)
- The Lucky Number (1932)
- Marry Me (1932)
- The Man from Toronto (1933)
- It's a Boy (1933)
- Soldiers of the King (1933)
- Aunt Sally (1934)
- Stormy Weather (1935)
- The Phantom Light (1935)
- Tudor Rose (1936)
- All In (1936)
- Good Morning, Boys (1937)
- Said O'Reilly to McNab (1937)
- The Lady Vanishes (1938)
- Convict 99 (1938)
- Shipyard Sally (1939)
- A Girl Must Live (1939)
- Night Train to Munich (1940)
- Kipps (1941)
- Cottage to Let (1941)
- The Young Mr. Pitt (1942)
- Tawny Pipit (1944)
- Don't Take It to Heart (1944)
- Waterloo Road (1945)
- The October Man (1947)
- The Mark of Cain (1947)
- Hungry Hill (1947)
- Escape (1948)
- It's Hard to Be Good (1948)
- Morning Departure (1950)
- Highly Dangerous (1950)
- Waterfront (1950)
- Night Without Stars (1951)
- Hunted (1952)
- The Black Knight (1954)
- Passage Home (1955)
- The Colditz Story (1955)
- Value for Money (1955)
- A Town Like Alice (1956)
- Carry on Sergeant (1958)
- Operation Amsterdam (1959)
- Rotten to the Core (1965) (received BAFTA nomination)
- Doctor in Clover (1966)
- The Long Duel (1967)
- Carry On... Up the Khyber (1968)
- Kidnapped (1971)
- Gold (1974)
