= Louis Levy =

British composer (1892–1957)

Louis Levy

Louis Levy (20 November 1892 – 18 August 1957) was an English film music director and conductor, who worked in particular on Alfred Hitchcock and Will Hay films. He was born in London and died in Slough, Buckinghamshire (now Berkshire).

== Early life ==
As a child Louis Levy played the violin, beginning with a toy violin that his father bought him at the age of seven. He later became the pupil of Guido Papini but due to his parents' limited means, ended his studies with Papini and began a period of self-study. This led to him gaining a scholarship at the London College of Music. Papini refused to allow Levy to study under anyone else, so resumed his tuition, this time free of charge.

== Career ==
He started his career in 1910, arranging and performing music for silent films. In 1916, he became musical director for the New Gallery Cinema in London. In 1921, he became Music Chief at the Shepherd's Bush Pavilion and is credited with being the first to develop the theme song in movies, and one of the first musicians to tackle difficulties that were holding back the progress of sound recording in films.

At the beginning of talkies, he joined the Gaumont British studios at Shepherd's Bush, where he was musical director for Gaumont's earliest sound picture, High Treason (1929). He became the head of the music department for all Gainsborough Pictures productions from 1933 onwards. The rich sounds emanating from his large orchestra are all the more impressive when one realises that electrical sound industry was barely ten years old. He worked in particular on Alfred Hitchcock and Will Hay films, directing the music for The 39 Steps and The Lady Vanishes.

Levy later had a long running BBC radio series Music From the Movies, which started in 1936 and lasted until the 1950s, and also toured the provincial theatres with his orchestra. The Music From the Movies March, reputedly composed by Levy, was the theme tune for the radio show, and opened all of the Gaumont newsreels of the time. He is also said to have composed the orchestral piece Maltese Entr'Acte.

In 1948, Levy became general musical director for the Associated British Picture Corporation, and during the 1950s he was head of music at Elstree Studios, where the films he worked on included Moby Dick (1956). Unlike his counterparts at other studios, Muir Mathieson and Ernest Irving, who cultivated art composers to contribute film scores, Levy operated a department of specialised staff composers and arrangers, closer to the Hollywood system. Among the talented arrangers he employed were Peter Yorke (who adapted the Levy sound for his own successful post-war concert orchestra) and Bretton Byrd, who was his chief music editor at Gaumont British.

Although often given the only musical credit on films for which he supervised the music, Alexander Gleason has argued that Levy did not compose or arrange the scores for any of the 250 talkies with which his name is associated.

== Personal life and death ==
Levy married Jean Moscovitch in 1923. In the late 1930s their address was 28 Bracknell Gardens, Hampstead. He died of a heart attack in Slough Hospital: the obituaries claimed he was 63 years old, though death records give the age as 64. He was survived by Jean. At the time of his death they were living at Orchard Cottage, Horton Road in Datchet, Buckinghamshire.

== Partial filmography ==
(Sole credit for the music, often as musical director, unless otherwise noted)

- She (1925)
- Balaclava (1928)
- The Devil's Maze (1929)
- High Treason
- Just for a Song (1930)
- Alf's Button (1930)
- No Lady (1931)
- Michael and Mary (1931)
- The Stronger Sex (1931)
- Third Time Lucky (1931)
- Baroud (with Jack Beaver, 1932)
- The Faithful Heart (1932)
- The Ghoul (with Leighton Lucas,1933)
- The Man from Toronto (1933)
- Waltz Time (adapting Johann Strauss, 1933)
- Leave It to Smith (1933)
- A Cuckoo in the Nest (1933)
- Sleeping Car (with Bretton Byrd, 1933)
- Channel Crossing (with Jack Beaver, 1933)
- It's a Boy (1933)
- Soldiers of the King (1933)
- Forbidden Territory (1934)
- Wild Boy (1934)
- My Old Dutch (with Jack Beaver, 1934)
- Dirty Work (with Jack Beaver, 1934)
- Princess Charming (with Leighton Lucas, 1934)
- Heat Wave (1935)
- My Heart Is Calling (with Tommie Connor and Harry S. Pepper, 1935)
- Oh, Daddy! (with Bretton Byrd, 1935)
- Fighting Stock (1935)
- Hyde Park Corner (1935)
- Stormy Weather (with Jack Beaver, 1935)
- Things Are Looking Up (1935)
- Brown on Resolution (1935)
- The 39 Steps (with Jack Beaver, Herbert Bath, Charles Williams, 1935)
- Heat Wave (1935)
- All In (1936)
- East Meets West (composer John Greenwood, 1936)
- Everybody Dance (music & lyrics, Mack Gordon, Harry Revel, 1936)
- Everything Is Thunder (with Jack Beaver, 1936)
- His Lordship (with Hubert Bath, 1936)
- It's Love Again (1936) (with Bretton Byrd, and music & lyrics by Sam Coslow, Harry Woods)
- Jack of All Trades (with Bretton Byrd, 1936)
- Secret Agent (composer John Greenwood, 1936)
- Tudor Rose (with Hubert Bath, 1936)
- The Great Barrier (with Hubert Bath, Jack Beaver, 1937)
- Head over Heels (music & lyrics, Mack Gordon, Harry Revel, 1937)
- Non-Stop New York (with Hubert Bath, Bretton Byrd, 1937)
- Said O'Reilly to McNab (with Jack Beaver, 1937)
- Oh, Mr Porter! (with Jack Beaver, 1937)
- O-Kay for Sound (1937)
- Young and Innocent (with Jack Beaver, 1937)
- Crackerjack (1938)
- Old Iron (1938)
- The Lady Vanishes (with Charles Williams, 1938)
- The Citadel (with Charles Williams, 1938)
- Ask a Policeman (1939)
- Shipyard Sally (1939)
- The Lambeth Walk (composer Jack Beaver, 1939)
- An Englishman's Home (1940)
- Night Train to Munich (1940)
- They Came by Night (with Charles Williams, 1940)
- The Young Mr. Pitt (1942)
- Uncensored (1942)
- We Dive at Dawn (1943)
- The Adventures of Tartu (1943)
- Millions Like Us (1943)
- The Man in Grey (composer Cedric Mallabey, 1943)
- Fanny by Gaslight (composer Cedric Mallabey, 1944)
- They Were Sisters (1945)
- I'll Be Your Sweetheart (1945)
- Man on the Run (composer Philip Green, 1948)
- The Glass Mountain (composer Nino Rota, 1949)
- The Hasty Heart (composer Jack Beaver, 1949)
- The Queen of Spades (composer Georges Auric, 1949)
- Under Capricorn (with Richard Addinsell, 1949)
- The Dancing Years (composer Ivor Novello, 1950)
- Captain Horatio Hornblower R.N. (composer Robert Farnon, 1951)
- So Little Time (1952)
- The Dam Busters (composers Eric Coates, Leighton Lucas, 1954)
- Yield to the Night (composer Ray Martin, 1956)
- 1984 (composer Malcolm Arnold, 1956)
- Tarzan and the Lost Safari (composer Clifton Parker, 1956)
- Moby Dick (composer Philip Sainton, 1956)
- Let's Be Happy (composers Nicholas Brodszky, Wally Stott, 1957)
- The Young and the Guilty (composer Sydney John Kay, 1957)
- No Time for Tears (composer Francis Chagrin, 1957)
- Woman in a Dressing Gown (1957)
