= James Wedgwood Drawbell =

British writer, playwright and journalist (1899–1979)

James Wedgwood Drawbell (1899–6 February 1979) was a British writer, playwright, and journalist, known in equal measure for his literary works and professional association (of variable closeness) with prominent figures of the day, including Winston Churchill, Bernard Shaw, Noël Coward, D. H. Lawrence, Margot Asquith, and many others. In 1925, he was hired by William Berry as editor-in-chief of the Sunday Chronicle to become the second youngest (after John Delane) British editor-in-chief of a newspaper ever, and he remained in that position until 1946, whereupon he undertook a variety of other occupations. Among other things, Drawbell wrote three autobiographies, which, in addition to being valuable and often minute accounts of the changing age, also contain unique and insightful recollections of his encounters with famous people from all walks of life—ranging from great men of letters such as Fitzgerald to politicians such as Hitler.

== Life ==
Drawbell, the youngest of 6 siblings to survive to maturity, was born in Falkirk to a pupil teacher from Linlithgow and the daughter of a locally prominent entrepreneurial and authoritative figure, one Francis Wedgwood Broome, whose late-life penchant for his newspaper Bo'ness Journal must have influenced Drawbell's choice of career. Drawbell's early years were overshadowed by his father's drinking problem, which always kept the family on the brink of poverty; the marital discord finally resulted in Drawbell's father being forced to leave for the Colonies for good. The rest of the family shortly thereafter emigrated to Edinburgh, where Drawbell attended school.

At the age of 17, he enlisted in one of the Scottish infantry regiments, where he served until the Great War ended. After a while, Drawbell and a friend sailed to Canada in pursuit of a position in journalism, but, unsatisfied with the limited prospects Montreal had to offer, they moved to New York. There he held a variety of jobs with different editions (such as The Journal and The World) and made a number of acquaintances; in particular, it was there that he first crossed paths with Coward and Fitzgerald.

Ultimately, at the age of 23, he elected to return to London, where he worked first for John Bull and then as editor-in-chief of the Sunday Chronicle, a newspaper in which he was to achieve the pinnacle of his journalistic career. Drawbell sought to revitalise the edition by making it relevant, up-to-date, and sometimes verging on provocative, and so engaged the most diverse contributors and attracted exclusive material. For example, his was the only newspaper to offer Jacob Epstein space for an apology of Rima, then a newly erected statue in Kensington Gardens that the contemporary public had by and large considered scandalous; he bought exclusive rights to Isadora Duncan's memoirs for £300 (up to £50,000 in today's money), thereby indirectly sponsoring Duncan's perilous Amilcar ride; he encouraged Monica Dickens in her literary pursuits; and he was one of the first recipients of Lady Chatterley's Lover (he dismissed it as a falsification).

Drawbell's consistent anti-Nazi stance is also notable: as he led the newspaper through the period leading up to and including World War II, he worked methodically to dispel—employing targeted pieces even from such people as Leon Trotsky—the notion that Hitler harboured no ill will towards Britain and consistently underlined the poor preparedness of Britain for the war, which he saw as inevitable already in 1930, when his correspondent James Mellor wrote from Berlin: "Hitler is fanatical and ruthless... he is a real menace to the British Empire and to world peace".

== Bibliography ==
Novels and autobiographies

- A Gallery of Women Collins (1933) Includes: Dora Russell, Lady Cory, Greta Garbo, Vicki Baum, Dodie Smith, Viscountess Rhondda
- Dorothy Thompson's English Journey: The Record of an Anglo-American Partnership (1942)
- Night and Day (1945)
- Drifts My Boat (1947)
- The long year. Allan Wingate, London (1958). (Political Diary from 1 September 1939 to 5 October 1940)
- The Sun within Us (1963)
- James Drawbell: An Autobiography (1964)
- Time on My Hands (1968)
- Scotland: Bitter Sweet : Macdonald (1972)

Plays

- The Milky Way (adapted for screen in 1932)
- Who Goes Next? (adapted for screen in 1938)
- A Lady Surrenders (adapted for screen in 1944)
