= Islington Studios =

Film studios located in London

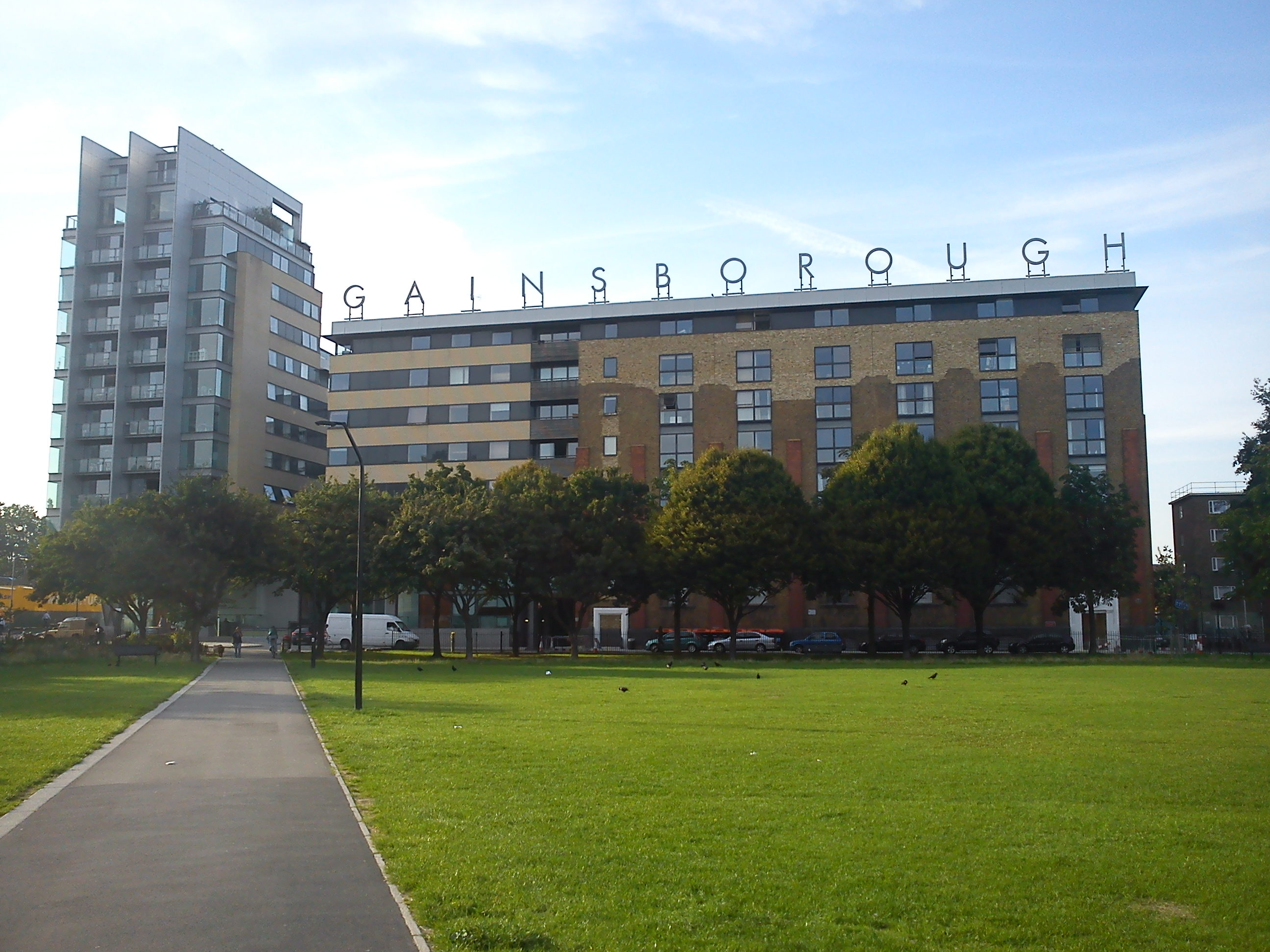
- Flats built on the site of Islington Studios
- Interactive map of the Islington Studios area
- Alternative names: Gainsborough Studios

General information
- Type: Film studios
- Location: Poole Street, Hoxton, London, United Kingdom
- Coordinates: 51.536120°N 0.088432°W
- Opened: 1919
- Closed: 1949
- Owner: Gainsborough Pictures (1924-1941); Rank Organisation (1941-1949)

Islington Studios, often known as Gainsborough Studios, were British film studios located on the south bank of the Regent's Canal, in Poole Street, Hoxton in the former Metropolitan Borough of Shoreditch, London between 1919 and 1949. The studios are closely associated with Gainsborough Pictures which was based there for most of the studios' history. During its existence Islington Studios worked closely with its sister Lime Grove Studios in Shepherd's Bush and many films were made partly at one studio and partly at the other. Amongst the films made at the studios were Alfred Hitchcock thrillers, Will Hay comedies and Gainsborough melodramas.

== History ==
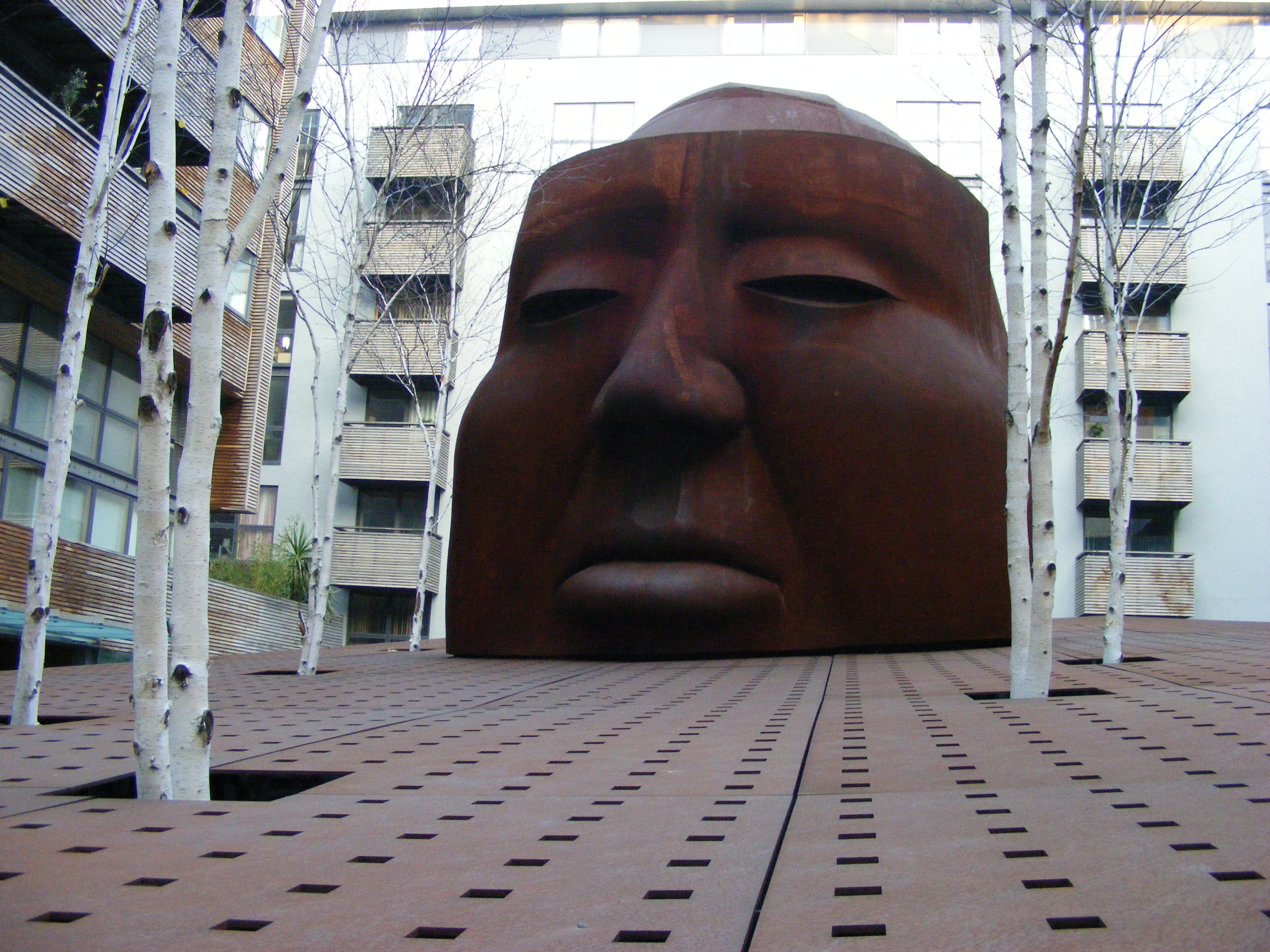
Sculpture of Alfred Hitchcock's head at flats on the site of Islington Studios

The studios building was originally built as a power station for the Great Northern & City Railway, and was acquired by the major American company Famous Players–Lasky which wanted to set up a British subsidiary. The building was converted into a two-stage studio, and production began in 1920. During this era Alfred Hitchcock made his start in films, when he was employed as an intertitle writer at Islington. In 1924 the Hollywood company sold off the studios which were bought by Michael Balcon's Gainsborough Pictures. The company enjoyed some success turning out silent films during the 1920s, at a time when other British companies were struggling.

In the late 1920s Gainsborough merged with the larger British Gaumont which owned the Lime Grove Studios. The conglomerate had ambitious plans to challenge Hollywood and produce more than twenty films a year. The larger Lime Grove Studios complex was selected to make expensive films while Islington Studios was designated for cheaper films, particularly comedies. However, during these years they served as overflow studios and many films scheduled for Lime Grove Studios were made partly at Islington Studios.

During the Slump of 1937, British Gaumont shut down production. Although it considered giving up filmmaking completely, it was decided to continue Gainsborough Pictures making slightly cheaper films. Lime Grove Studios were shut down and all production switched to Islington Studios. The success of some of these late 1930s Islington Studios productions such as The Lady Vanishes helped Gainsborough to keep in business.

Unlike many other studios, Islington Studios was not requisitioned when war broke out and production continued there, but the studios were temporarily closed because it was feared that a direct hit from a German bomb during an air raid would make the large chimney collapse. All production was switched to the re-opened Lime Grove Studios. Both studios came under the control of the Rank Organisation when it bought Gainsborough in 1941.

Following the war, Islington Studios were re-opened. In 1946 Betty Box was placed in charge of the studios when her brother Sydney Box was appointed by Rank to run Gainsborough Pictures. Over the next three years the studios turned out a large number of thrillers and comedies. In 1949 both Islington Studios and Lime Grove Studios were closed when Rank concentrated production at Pinewood Studios. Today a block of flats stand where the studios used to be. The block's courtyard features a large sculpture of Alfred Hitchcock's head, by sculptor Antony Donaldson.

== See also ==
- List of Gainsborough Pictures films

== Bibliography ==
- Macnab, Geoffrey. J. Arthur Rank and the British Film Industry. Routledge, 1994.
- Murphy, Robert. Realism and Tinsel: Cinema and Society in Britain, 1939–1949. Routledge, 1992.
- Warren, Patricia. British Film Studios: An Illustrated History. Batsford, 2001.
