= Thomas Burke bibliography =

This page is a complete bibliography of the English author Thomas Burke.

== Fiction ==
- Limehouse Nights. London: Grant Richards, 1916; Freeport, NY: Books for Libraries Press, 1969.
- Twinkletoes: a Tale of Chinatown. London: Grant Richards, 1917; aka Twinkletoes: a Tale of Limehouse. New York: Robert M. McBride, 1918.
- Broken Blossoms: a selection of stories from Limehouse Nights. London, 1920.
- Whispering Windows: Tales of the Waterside. London: Grant Richards, 1921; aka More Limehouse Nights. New York: George H. Doran, 1921.
- The Wind and the Rain: A Book of Confessions. New York: Doran, 1924. London: Thornton Butterworth, 1924;
- The Sun in Splendour. London: Constable, 1927; New York: George H. Doran, 1926.
- East of Mansion House. London: Cassell, 1928; New York: Doran, 1926.
- The Bloomsbury Wonder. London: Mandrake Press, 1929.
- The Flower of Life. Boston: Little, Brown, 1931; Constable, 1929.
- Go Lovely Rose. Brooklyn, N. Y.: Sesphra Library, 1931. "This edition consists of 110 copies of which 100 are for sale, and the type has been distributed."
- The Pleasantries of Old Quong. London: Constable, 1931; aka A Tea-Shop in Limehouse, Boston: Little, Brown, 1931. Reprinted by Freeport, NY: Books for Libraries Press, 1969, 1972.
- Night Pieces: Eighteen Tales. London: Constable, 1935; Freeport, NY: Books for Libraries Press, 1971; Richmond, VA: Valancourt Books, 2016.
- Abduction: A Story of Limehouse. London: Herbert Jenkins, 1939.
- Victorian Grotesque. London: Herbert Jenkins, 1941.
- Dark Nights. London: Herbert Jenkins, 1944. Includes novelette "The Bloomsbury Wonder."
- The Best Stories Of. London: Phoenix House, 1950.
- The Golden Gong and Other Night-Pieces. Ed. Jessica Amanda Salmonson. Afterword reminiscence by Grant Richards. Ashcroft: Ash Tree Press, 2001. Only 600 copies. Collects 20 tales from Night Pieces and other collections.

== Non-fiction ==
- Nights in Town: A London Autobiography. London: Allen & Unwin, 1915; aka Nights in London. New York: Henry Holt, 1916.
- Out and About: A Note-book of London in War-Time. London: Allen & Unwin, 1918; aka Out and About in London, New York: Holt, 1919. Includes short story, "The Kid’s Man."
- The Outer Circle: Rambles in Remote London. New York: Doran, 1921; London: Allen and Unwin, 1921.
- The London Spy: A Book of Town Travels. New York: Doran, 1922; London: Thornton Butterworth, 1922.
- Essays of Today and Yesterday. London: George Harrap, 1928.
- The English Inn. London/New York: Longmans, Green, 1930; rev. ed. London: Jenkins, 1947
- The Real East End. Text by Thomas Burke. Lithographs by Pearl Binder. London: Constable, 1932.
- The Beauty of England. London: Harrap, 1933.
- London In My Time. London: Rich & Cowan, 1934.
- Vagabond Minstrel, The Adventures of Thomas Dermody. Longmans, Green and Co., London, 1936.
- Will someone lead me to a pub?: Being a Note upon certain of the Taverns, old and new, of London; Presenting something of their Story, their Company, and their Quiddity. Which may entertain Those at Home, and may cause a Spasm of Nostalgia in the Breasts of Englishmen in the Dominions, the Dependencies, and the lonely Out-posts of our Far-Flung etc., where To-day, as in Kipling’s Day, Men sit Swapping Lies about the Purple East, and when they tire of that, talk in the sour-sweet Accents of the Exile, of their Favourite London Bars. Illustrated by Frederick Carter. London: George Routledge, 1936.
- Murder at Elstree; or, Mr. Thurtell and his gig. London/New York: Longmans, Green, 1936.
- Dinner is served! or, Eating round the world in London, being a brief glance, for the benefit of visitors, at the many ways and means of dining in London; from the fashionable restaurants of great reputation, through the various grill rooms, and the assorted nationalities of Soho, to the old chop houses and the more dainty snack bars. With some observations on the gastronomical customs of past and present; brief sketches of each kind of restaurant; and a note of any special dishes peculiar to this or that restaurant. London: G. Routledge, 1937.
- Living in Bloomsbury. London: G. Allen & Unwin, 1939.
- English Night-Life; from Norman curfew to present black-out. London: Batsford, 1941.
- The Streets of London through the centuries. New York: Scribner’s/London: Batsford, 1940. Also Batsford, 1949. Batsford, 1941.
- English Inns. With 8 plates in colour and 24 illustrations in black and white. London: Collins, 1943.
- The English Townsman as he was and as he is. London: Batsford, 1946.
- Introducing Britain. By K. Johnstone, T. Burke, H. B. Brennan, etc. London, 1938. Revised 2nd ed., 1946.
- Son of London. London: Herbert Jenkins, 1946.
- The English Inn. With 24 photographs by Will F. Taylor and a pencil sketch by Edmond C. Warre. Introduction by A. P. Herbert. Illustrated edition. London/New York: Longmans, Green, 1931. Re-issue, revised. Country Books. London, 1947.
- Travel in England: from pilgrim and pack-horse to light car and plane. London: Batsford, 1942. Also Batsford, 1949.
- Voices on the Green. London: Michael Joseph, 1945. Anthology of original fiction, verse, song and art produced as a fund-raising project for the St. Mary’s Hospital for Women and Children. Contains fiction by André Maurois, J. L. Hudson, Burke, James Laver, Frank Swinnerton, John Brophy, Marjorie Bowen etc.

== Poetry ==
- Verses. (1910)
- Pavements and Pastures: A Book of Songs (1912)
- Kiddie Land, ed. by Margaret G. Hays and Thomas Burke. London: Dean and Son, 1913.
- London Lamps: A Book of Songs London: Richards, 1917; New York: McBride, 1919.
- The Song Book of Quong Lee of Limehouse. London: Allen & Unwin, 1920. New York: Holt, 1920. 66 poems supposedly written by Quong Lee.

== As editor ==
- The Small People: A Little Book of Verse About Children for Their Elders. London: Chapman and Hall, 1910. Burke edited this anthology of 140 poems, which includes three of his own.
- An Artist's Day Book: A Treasury of Good Counsel from the Great Masters in the Arts for Their Disciples. Edited by Thomas Burke. London: Herbert and Daniel, 1911; aka Life and Art and Truth and Beauty 2 vols. London: Cape, 1921; Boston: Humphries, 1937.
- The Charm of the West Country, Bristol: Arrowsmith, 1913.
- Children in Verse: Fifty Songs of Playful Childhood. London: Duckworth, 1913. Boston: Little, Brown, 1914. Anthology of poems from various authors edited by Burke.
- The Contented Mind: An Anthology of Optimism, London: Truslove and Hanson, 1914.
- The Charm of England: An Anthology compiled and edited by Thomas Burke. London: Truslove and Hanson, 1914
- The German Army from Within, by B. G. Baker, New York: Doran, 1914.
- The Book of the Inn, being two hundred pictures of the English inn from the earliest times to the coming of the railway hotel. Selected and edited by Thomas Burke. New York: George H. Doran, 1927. English edition, Constable, 1927.
- The Ecstasies of Thomas De Quincey. Chosen by Thomas Burke. London: Harrap, 1929; New York: Doubleday, 1929.

== Introductions etc. ==
- Jack McLaren, My Odyssey. With a preface by Thomas Burke. 2nd ed. revised. London, 1928.
