= The Middle Watch =

Middle watch or The Middle Watch may refer to:

- The middle watch (or midwatch), one of the regular periods of work duty under a watch system; see Watch system#Traditional system
- The Middle Watch (play), a play by Ian Hay
- The Middle Watch (1930 film)
- The Middle Watch (1940 film)
