= Beryl and the Croucher =

"Beryl and the Croucher" is a short story by the British writer Thomas Burke which was part of his 1916 collection Limehouse Nights. A washed-up boxer, known as "the Croucher" for his distinctive fighting style, having fought his last fight sinks into dissipation and crime in the East End of London. His only hope to recover his former sense of self-worth is a former lover named Beryl.

== Adaptation ==
In 1949 the story was turned into a film No Way Back directed by Stefan Osiecki and starring Terence de Marney, Eleanor Summerfield and Jack Raine. The plot was moved to a contemporary setting and was part of the Spiv cycle of films of the late 1940s.

== Bibliography ==
- Chibnall, Steve & Murphy, Robert. British crime cinema. Routledge, 1999.
- Newland, Paul. The Cultural Construction of London's East End: Urban Iconography, Modernity and the Spatialisation of Englishness. 2008.
- Witchard, Anne Veronica. Thomas Burke's Dark Chinoiserie. Ashgate, 2009.
