= Suspense (play) =

- Original language: English
- Written by: Patrick MacGill
- Genre: War drama

Premiere
- Date: 8 April 1930
- Place: Duke of York's Theatre, London

Suspense is a 1930 play by the Irish writer Patrick MacGill. Set during the First World War it focuses on a small group of soldiers who are aware that the Germans are building a mine under their trench and have to sit waiting for the enemy to detonate it.

It ran for 64 performances at the Duke of York's Theatre in London's West End. The cast included Robert Douglas, Roland Culver and Gordon Harker. It was produced by Reginald Denham.

The same year it was adapted into a film Suspense directed by Walter Summers and starring Cyril McLaglen, Jack Raine and Hay Petrie.

== Bibliography ==
- Goble, Alan. The Complete Index to Literary Sources in Film. Walter de Gruyter, 1999.
- Wearing, J.P. The London Stage 1930-1939: A Calendar of Productions, Performers, and Personnel. Rowman & Littlefield, 2014.
