= John Brahm =

German film and television director (1893–1982)

- Born: Hans Brahm; August 17, 1893; Hamburg, German Empire
- Died: October 12, 1982 (aged 89); Malibu, California, U.S.
- Occupations: Film director, television director

John Brahm (August 17, 1893 – October 12, 1982) was a German film and television director. His films include The Undying Monster (1942), The Lodger (1944), Hangover Square (1945), The Locket (1946), The Brasher Doubloon (1947), and the 3D horror film The Mad Magician (1954).

== Early life ==
Brahm was born Hans Brahm in Hamburg, the son of actor Ludwig Brahm and his wife. His family was involved in theater; his paternal uncle was the theatrical impresario Otto Brahm.

== Career ==
Brahm started his career in the theatre as an actor. After serving as an infantryman in the Imperial German Army on both the Western and Russian Fronts during World War I, he traveled and worked among the cities of Vienna, Berlin and Paris, which had the most artistic cultures of the time. He eventually became a director, and was appointed as resident director for acting troupes at the Deutsches Theater and the Lessing Theater, both in Berlin.

With the rise of Adolf Hitler and the Nazi Party in Germany in the 1930s, Brahm left the country, first moving to England. After working as a movie production supervisor, he got a chance to direct his first film, Broken Blossoms, in 1936. It was a remake of the American director D.W. Griffith's 1919 film by the same name.

In 1937, Brahm moved to the US, where he began his Hollywood career at Columbia Pictures. He joined an increasing number of European emigres working in the American film studios in this period. Eventually, he moved to 20th Century-Fox. He directed the ill-fated Let Us Live, the true story of two men wrongly convicted of murder who were almost executed by the Commonwealth of Massachusetts. State authorities were embarrassed by this fiasco and put pressure on the studio to cancel the film. The studio completed the film, but kept it to a small budget.

In his book, The American Cinema: Directors and Directions 1929–1968, American film historian and critic Andrew Sarris states that Brahm "hit his stride" in the 1940s with "mood-drenched melodramas." He suggested that Brahm's work declined after this period. Sarris said that Brahm did not lack work, as he made "approximately 150 TV films" during the 1950s and 1960s. Among these, he also directed numerous episodes of Alfred Hitchcock Presents and The Twilight Zone. Brahm's last full-length film was Hot Rods to Hell.

== Personal life ==
He married an actress named Hanna, who ran off with another actor, leaving him seriously depressed. His second marriage was to actress Dolly Haas. They divorced after coming to the United States, when their careers moved in different directions. She appeared in New York theatre and in 1943 she married again, to Al Hirschfeld, the caricaturist for The New York Times.

In the 1950s, Brahm married his third wife, Anna. They had two children together. Their grandchildren include Christopher Maltauro, who became a movie producer and assistant director.

== Filmography (not including television work) ==
- Broken Blossoms (1936)
- Counsel for Crime (1937)
- Penitentiary (1938)
- Girls' School (1938)
- Let Us Live (1939)
- Rio (1939)
- Escape to Glory (1940)
- Wild Geese Calling (1941)
- The Undying Monster (1942)
- Tonight We Raid Calais (1943)
- Bomber's Moon (1943) (uncredited)
- Wintertime (1943)
- The Lodger (1944)
- Guest in the House (1944)
- Hangover Square (1945)
- Three Little Girls in Blue (1946) (uncredited)
- The Locket (1946)
- The Brasher Doubloon (1947)
- Singapore (1947)
- Siren of Atlantis (1949) (uncredited reshoots)
- The Miracle of Our Lady of Fatima (1952)
- The Thief of Venice (1950)
- Face to Face (1952)
- The Diamond Queen (1953)
- The Mad Magician (1954)
- The Golden Plague (1954)
- With This Ring (1954, short film)
- Special Delivery (1955)
- Bengazi (1955)
- Hot Rods to Hell (1967)
