= Suspense (1930 film) =

1930 film directed by Walter Summers

- Directed by: Walter Summers
- Written by: Walter Summers; Patrick MacGill
- Based on: Suspense by Patrick MacGill
- Produced by: Walter Summers
- Starring: Mickey Brantford; Cyril McLaglen; Jack Raine; Hay Petrie
- Cinematography: Theodor Sparkuhl; Hal Young
- Edited by: Walter Stokvis
- Music by: Dallas Bower
- Production company: British International Pictures
- Distributed by: Wardour Films
- Release date: 4 July 1930
- Running time: 75 minutes
- Country: United Kingdom
- Language: English
- Budget: $50,000
- Box office: $150,000

Suspense is a 1930 British war film directed by Walter Summers and starring Mickey Brantford, Cyril McLaglen and Jack Raine. It was written by Summers, adapted from the 1930 play of the same title by Patrick MacGill.

== Premise ==
During the First World War a British unit take up a new position in a trench unaware that the Germans are laying a mine underneath it.

== Cast ==
- Mickey Brantford as Private Pettigrew
- Cyril McLaglen as Cyril McClusky
- Jack Raine as Captain Wilson
- Hay Petrie as Scruffy
- Fred Groves as Private Lomax
- Percy Parsons as Private Brett
- Syd Crossley as Corporal Brown
- Hamilton Keene as Officer

== Production ==
The film's sets were designed by John Mead. The battle effects were created under the supervision of Cliff Richardson at Elstree Studios which was owned by British International Pictures. Richardson recalled: "I was put in charge of battle effects, which were on a fairly large scale. ... Even today I shudder to think of the chances that were taken in making up flash powder."

== Reception ==
Kine Weekly wrote: The realism is intense, with very sound character drawing and most convincing war settings. Both camera work and acting are on a high level. ... Walter Summers has dealt extremely well with his grim subject. With the exception of All Quiet on the Western Front,'the war atmosphere has not been bettered. ... Direction is particularly good, and Summers has made use of his camera to great advantage."

The Daily Film Renter wrote: "The best performance is contributed by D. Hay Petrie, who, as the sock-knitting optimist, does what he invariably dows on the stage – strolls away with the major portion of the plaudits. The dialogue itself is coarser than anything yet heard in a British talkie, but the tone is clear. The camera work is notable, especially in the night scenes."
