= Harmony Heaven =

1930 film directed by Thomas Bentley

- Directed by: Thomas Bentley
- Written by: Randall Faye; Frank Launder; Arthur Wimperis
- Starring: Polly Ward; Stuart Hall; Trilby Clark; Jack Raine
- Cinematography: Theodor Sparkuhl
- Edited by: Sam Simmonds
- Production company: British International Pictures
- Distributed by: Wardour Films
- Release date: March 1930
- Running time: 61 minutes
- Country: United Kingdom
- Language: English

Harmony Heaven is a 1930 British musical film directed by Thomas Bentley and starring Polly Ward, Stuart Hall and Trilby Clark. It was written by Randall Faye, Frank Launder and Arthur Wimperis. This film had Pathechrome inserts, and was one of Britain's first two musical films, along with Raise the Roof (1930). It was made at Elstree Studios with sets designed by the art director John Mead.

Alfred Hitchcock is sometimes cited as an uncredited co-director but he did not actually work on the film.

== Plot ==
Bob Farrell wants to be a song writer, and with the assistance of Billie Breeze, the leading lady of the revue "Harmony Heaven", he gets a small part and contributes a song, eventually taking the place of the leading man.

== Cast ==
- Polly Ward as Billie Breeze
- Stuart Hall as Bob Farrell
- Trilby Clark as Lady Violet Mistley
- Jack Raine as Stuart
- Philip Hewland as Beasley Cutting
- Percy Standing as producer
- Gus Sharland as Stage Manager
- Aubrey Fitzgerald as Suggs
- Edna Prince as the singer

== Reception ==
Kine Weekly wrote: "Some tuneful songs, particularly "Harmony Heaven" and "That's All That Matters," quite well put over, are the main asset of this song and dance feature. Story is very slight. ... Polly Ward shows to advantage, and one would like to see her given better opportunities for acting. Stuart Hall is fair as the hero, but his voice is much better than his histrionic ability."

Picture Show wrote: "Ridiculous story, somewhat compensated by the colour, music, and dancing numbers of this British contribution to backstage stuff, Polly Ward, Jack Raine, Trilby Clark, and Stuart Hall do their utmost in this."

== Home media ==
The film has been released on UK DVD by Network Distributing.

== See also ==
- List of early color feature films
