= John Mead (art director) =

British art director

- Occupation: Art director
- Years active: 1930-1940 (film)

John Mead was a British art director. He was employed designing the sets of more than thirty films.

== Selected filmography ==
- Raise the Roof (1930)
- Harmony Heaven (1930)
- Suspense (1930)
- Murder! (1930)
- Compromising Daphne (1930)
- The Middle Watch (1930)
- The Flying Fool (1931)
- Lucky Girl (1932)
- Red Wagon (1933)
- The Outcast (1934)
- The Return of Bulldog Drummond (1934)
- Abdul the Damned (1935)
- Invitation to the Waltz (1935)
- Love in Exile (1936)
- Gypsy Melody (1936)
- Sensation (1936)
- Aren't Men Beasts! (1937)
- Spring Handicap (1937)
- Bulldog Drummond at Bay (1937)
- At the Villa Rose (1940)

== Bibliography ==
- Bergfelder, Tim & Harris, Sue & Street, Sarah. Film Architecture and the Transnational Imagination: Set Design in 1930s European Cinema. Amsterdam University Press, 2007.
