= No Way Back (1949 film) =

- Directed by: Stefan Osiecki
- Written by: Thomas Burke (short story); Stefan Osiecki; Terence De Marney
- Produced by: Derrick De Marney
- Starring: Terence De Marney; Eleanor Summerfield; Jack Raine; John Salew
- Cinematography: Robert Navarro
- Edited by: Stefan Osiecki
- Music by: Eric Spear
- Production company: Concanen Productions
- Distributed by: Eros Films
- Release date: July 1949
- Running time: 72 minutes
- Country: United Kingdom
- Language: English

No Way Back is a 1949 British second feature ('B') crime film directed by Stefan Osiecki and starring Terence De Marney, Eleanor Summerfield and Jack Raine. It was written by Thomas Burke, Osiecki and De Marney, from a short story by Burke.

The story concerns an injured boxer who sinks into bad company when his fighting career comes to an end leading to a spiral of crime.

== Plot ==
Johnnie Thompson, a veteran and popular boxer known as "The Croucher" for his distinctive fighting style, enters the ring against a much younger opponent Tommy McGovern. Despite his years of hard living, Thompson remains confident of winning but soon finds himself in trouble. Drawing on all his reserves he is able to knock his opponent down but not out. McGovern gets up and then knocks Thompson out for a ten count.

Thompson still hopes to continue his career and regain his title, but a visit to the Doctor's informs him that the sight in one of his eyes has gone. He realises he will be unable to fight on and retires. His promoter explains that he spent most of his money during his career, and even a benefit held in his honour goes towards paying taxes. His wife, a glamorous nightclub singer, leaves him now that he can no longer provide expensive things for her. Thompson sinks into self-pity, returning to pubs in his old haunt in East London where he grew up to drink himself into an alcoholic stupor.

One day while drinking, he encounters a former girlfriend from before his boxing career took off, Beryl. She is now the girl of a local big-shot gangster boss Joe Sleat. Sleat, who remembers Thompson as a young boy and was always jealous, is amused to see him in his current state and offers him a job working for him. Beryl tries to stop Thompson from being drawn into Sleat's orbit, but she is unsuccessful. Before long Thompson has become one of Sleat's best men, although he is treated contemptuously by the boss.

Before long Beryl and Thompson are clearly developing feelings for each other, irritating Sleat who feels that Thompson is getting above himself. He sets up an armed robbery on a jewellers and plans it so that Thompson will be killed in the raid. Beryl gets wind of this and intercepts the message telling Thompson about the raid, and then informs the police of Sleat's robbery. In the ensuing chaos, Sleat shoots a policeman dead and escapes. Now a fugitive, he returns to his house where Beryl and Thompson are. She tries to tell Thompson not to get involved, but he still feels obliged to Sleat for giving him a break in his outfit.

When the police arrive the three of them make a run for it and are pursued by the police through the streets of London's docklands. They finally hole up in a warehouse and Thompson and Sleat shoot down two more policemen. As Sleat gleefully points out to him, Thompson is now in as much trouble as he is. They all face hanging for their crime, and decide to fight it out. The situation rapidly develops into a siege. Sleat begins to break down, and eventually tries to make a run for it but is killed.

Thompson and Beryl continue to hold out, but it has dawned on him there is literally no way back. Restored by Beryl's confession of her love for him, and the sound of a nearby radio recounting the ongoing story of the siege and the career of the former champion "Croucher" Thompson – allowing him to briefly relive his glory days as a fighter – he accepts his fate and calmly walks outside to be shot down.

== Cast ==
- Terence De Marney as Johnnie Thompson
- Eleanor Summerfield as Beryl
- Jack Raine as Joe Sleat
- John Salew as Sammy Linkman
- Shirley Quentin as Sally Thompson
- Dennis Val Norton as Harry
- Gerald Lawson as Mike Taylor
- Tommy McGovern as himself
- Peggy Clarke as Miss Carter
- Thomas Gallagher as Bill
- Gerald Pring as doctor
- Anthony Valentine as little boy

== Production ==
No Way Back was based on the short story "Beryl and the Croucher" by Thomas Burke, from his 1916 collection Limehouse Nights, who was known for his writings set in the East End of London. It is part of the spiv cycle of films made between 1945 and 1950. It was made at Nettlefold Studios in Walton-on-Thames.

The real-life boxer Tommy McGovern appears in the opening fight scene of the film as Thompson's opponent.

== Reception ==
The Monthly Film Bulletin wrote: "Eleanor Summerfield endows Beryl with something more than the conventional "heart of gold" and her accomplished acting is the redeeming feature of this unenterprising version of the conventional story."

In British Sound Films: The Studio Years 1928–1959 David Quinlan rated the film as "average", writing: "Competent acting in undistinguished thriller."
