= Broken Blossoms (1936 film) =

1936 British film by John Brahm

- Directed by: John Brahm
- Written by: Emlyn Williams
- Based on: '"The Chink and the Child" by Thomas Burke
- Produced by: Julius Hagen
- Starring: Arthur Margetson; Emlyn Williams; Basil Radford; Dolly Haas
- Cinematography: Curt Courant; Hal Young
- Edited by: Ralph Kemplen
- Music by: Karol Rathaus
- Production company: Twickenham Studios
- Distributed by: Twickenham Film Distributors Ltd (UK) Imperial Distributing Corporation (US); Haussmann Films (France)
- Release dates: 20 May 1936 (UK); 13 January 1937 (US)
- Running time: 78 minutes
- Country: United Kingdom
- Language: English

Broken Blossoms is a 1936 British drama film directed by John Brahm and starring Emlyn Williams, Arthur Margetson, Basil Radford and Edith Sharpe. It was written by Emlyn Williams based on the short story "The Chink and the Child" by Thomas Burke from his collection Limehouse Nights (1916), and was produced at Twickenham Studios in London. The story had previously been adapted by D. W. Griffith for his film Broken Blossoms (1919) starring Lillian Gish. Director Bernard Vorhaus was technical supervisor.

== Plot ==
A Chinese Buddhist missionary comes to London where he works in the slums and helps a young girl being ill-treated by her abusive father.

== Cast ==
- Dolly Haas as Lucy Burrows
- Emlyn Williams as Chen
- Arthur Margetson as Battling Burrows
- C. V. France as High Priest
- Basil Radford as Mr. Reed
- Edith Sharpe as Mrs. Reed
- Ernest Jay as Alf
- Bertha Belmore as Daisy
- Gibb McLaughlin as Evil Eye
- Ernest Sefton as manager
- Donald Calthrop as old Chinaman
- Kathleen Harrison as Mrs. Lossy
- Kenneth Villiers as missionary
- Dorothy Minto as woman
- Sam Wilkinson as guide
- Jerry Verno as Bert

== Reception ==
The Monthly Film Bulletin wrote: "The adaptation is clever and effective, and gives a vivid and unsentimentalised picture of East End life. The dialogue is crisp and has flashes of genuine Cockney humour. The story is told with stark realism, and the director has gone all out to extract every ounce of pathos from the tragic and, at times, sordid story. Contrast is achieved on the one hand by the charming sequences when Lucy is in Chen's room and on the other by the vigorous boxing match. The character drawing is extremely good, even the minor parts being strongly individualised. The acting is on a consistently high level. Dolly Haas gives a remarkable and unforgettable performance. Emlyn Williams wins interest and sympathy for Chen, and Arthur Margetson is unrelievedly brutal as Burrows. The production is on a lavish scale. This film will not appeal to those who dislike being harrowed."

The Daily Film Renter wrote: "A really beautiful piece of work – but terribly grim and sordid. Dolly Haas gives magnificent performance as ill-used slum child who finds friend in young Limehouse Buddhist. Direction sensitive and well balanced, with magnificent shots of river and passages between distracted child and brutal father almost appalling in their tensity, despite few light touches here and there. Production values credit to all concerned. Audiences who can appreciate unrelenting realism, will find it absorbing."

Kine Weekly wrote: "Romantic drama of sombre beauty and drab charm, intelligently and artistically adapted from Thomas Burke's famous short story. The atmosphere in which the delicate love interest is promoted is one of harsh brutality, but arising from ugly soil is sentiment of exquisite delicacy and immense appeal, and situations of tremendous power. Stark, vital, capably characterised, particularly by Dolly Haas in the lead, and brilliantly mounted, the film is the equal of its famous silent predecessor in quality and entertainment."

Picture Show wrote: "Despite the fundamental sordidness of the theme ... this British film is deserving of high praise for its delicacy of treatment and the fragile beauty that pervades it. Dolly Haas reveals a sensitive simplicity that lifts her, as she lifts the film, high above the ordinary run, and the direction is as understanding and as intelligent as the star's acting."

Variety wrote: "This one is all wrong. Even if it were perfectly made from every angle, the idea would still be old-fashioned. Maudlin bathos is not present-day entertainment for a full length film, especially when unrelieved by a single bit of comedy, as is the case in this reproduction of the old Griffith silent in talker form. Makeups alone are not characterization. Emlyn Williams never once gives the feeling that he is actually a Chinaman. He starts of with an attempted accent, which savors more of Welsh than Chinese. Dolly Haas, as Lucy, seems to have learned to speak her part as if Americanized mechanically without fully understanding the meaning, and throughout is more continental in demeanor than Limehouse. Arthur Margetson in makeup and action conducts himself as if he were trying to do a particularly emphatic Bill Sykes. This is the trouble throughout. No member of the cast gives the impression that he or she is what they are attempting to be. The whole thing is mechanical and played on one key, lacking the requisite atmosphere. D. W. Griffith who produced the original silent with Barthelmess-Gish came over on this chore but without contributing much to the local production."
