= Thomas Burke (author) =

British author (1886–1945)

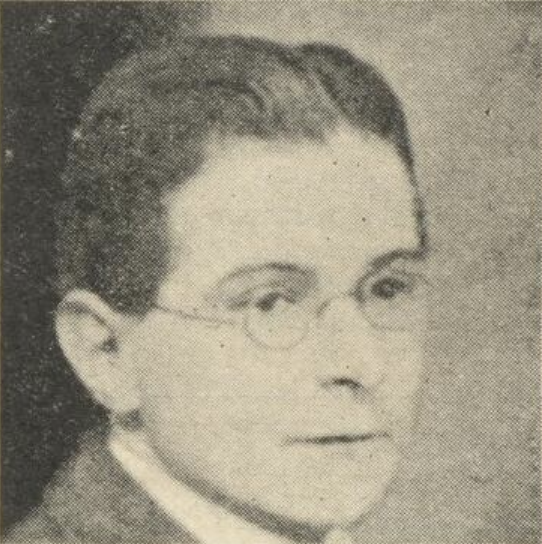
- Burke, c. 1925
- Born: 29 November 1886; Clapham Junction, London, England
- Died: 22 September 1945 (aged 58); Homeopathic Hospital, Bloomsbury, London, England
- Occupations: Novelist, journalist, poet
- Writing career
- Movements: Modernism, Realism

Thomas Burke (29 November 1886 – 22 September 1945) was a British author. He was born in Clapham Junction, London.

His first successful publication was Limehouse Nights (1916), a collection of stories centred on life in the poverty-stricken Limehouse district of London. Many of Burke's books feature the Chinese character Quong Lee as narrator.

"The Lamplit Hour", an incidental poem from Limehouse Nights, was set to music in the United States by Arthur Penn in 1919. That same year, American film director D. W. Griffith used another tale from the collection, "The Chink and the Child" as the basis of his screenplay for the movie Broken Blossoms. Griffith based his film Dream Street (1921) on Burke's "Gina of Chinatown" and "Song of the Lamp".

== Life ==
Burke was born Sydney Thomas Burke on 29 November 1886 in Clapham Junction. Burke's father died when he was barely a few months old and he was eventually sent to live with his uncle in Poplar. At the age of ten he was removed to a home for middle-class boys who were "[r]espectably descended but without adequate means to their support." When Burke turned sixteen he started working as an office boy, a job that he deeply detested. In 1901, he published his first professional written work entitled "The Bellamy Diamonds" in the magazine Spare Moments. He also edited some anthologies of children's poetry that were published in 1910–1913.

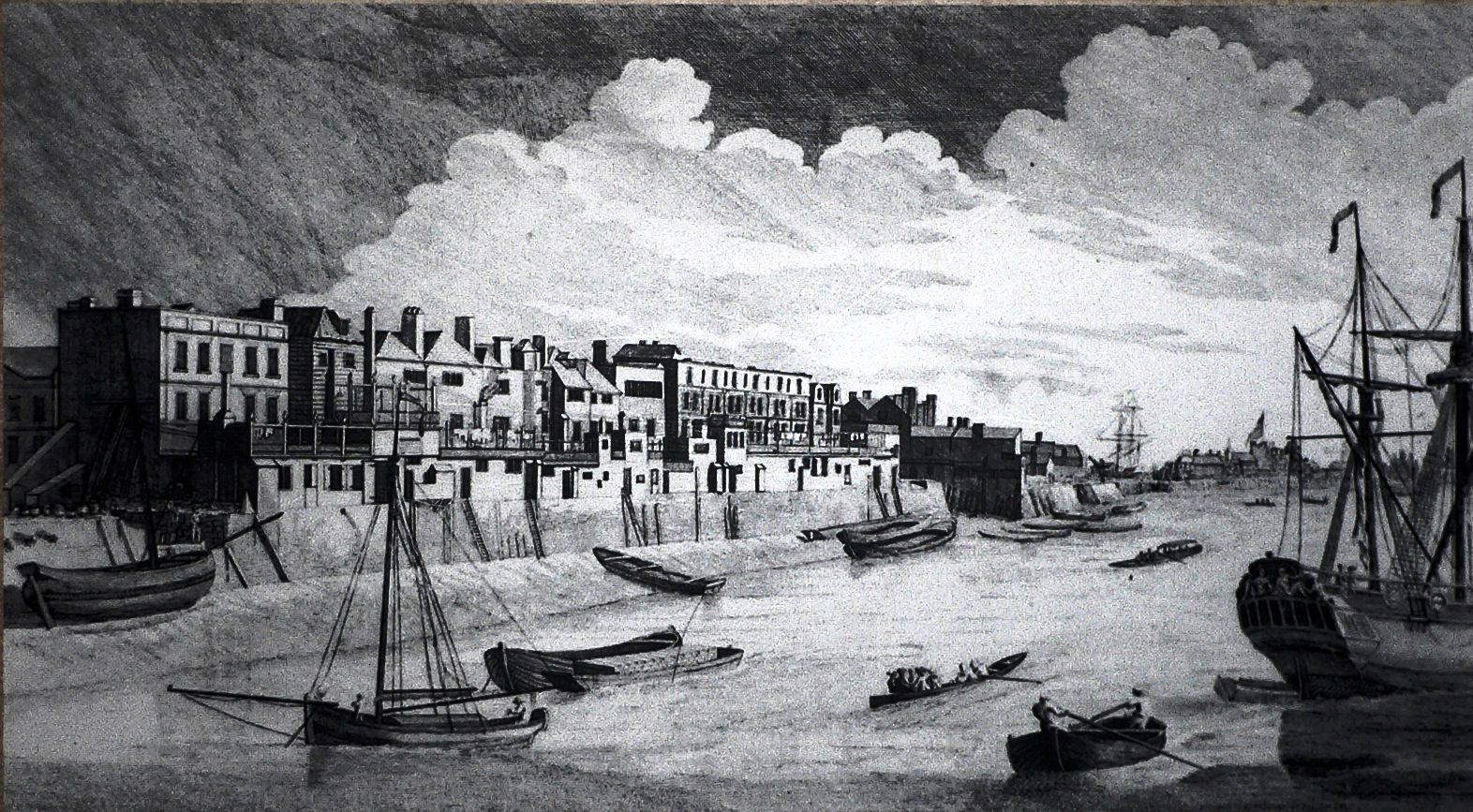
A lithograph of the riverside at Limehouse by publisher John Boydell (1751)

In 1915, Burke published Nights in Town: A London Autobiography, which featured his descriptions of working-class London nightlife including the essay, 'A Chinese Night, Limehouse' However, it was not until the publication of Limehouse Nights in 1916 that he obtained any substantial acclaim as an author. This collection of melodramatic short stories, set in a lower-class environment populated by Chinese immigrants, was published in three British periodicals, The English Review, Colour and The New Witness, and received marked attention from literary reviewers. Limehouse Nights helped to earn Burke a reputation as "the laureate of London's Chinatown". Burke's writing also influenced contemporary popular forms of entertainment, such as the Western film industry. Indeed, D. W. Griffith used the short story "The Chink and the Child" from Limehouse Nights as the basis for his popular silent film Broken Blossoms (1919). However, Limehouse Nights also proved controversial upon release, being "banned for immorality by the circulating libraries and Burke [being] condemned as a "blatant agitator" by the Times Literary Supplement for his evocative portrayal of a hybrid East End." The Times Literary Supplement wrote that

In place of the steady, equalised light which he should have thrown on that pestiferous spot off the West India Dock Road, he has been content... with flashes of limelight and fireworks.

Burke continued to develop his descriptions of London life throughout his later literary works. He gradually expanded his range with novels such as The Sun in Splendor, which was published in 1926. He also continued to publish essays on the London environment, including pieces such as "The Real East End" and "London in My Times". Burke died in the Homeopathic Hospital in Queens Square, Bloomsbury on 22 September 1945. His short story "The Hands of Ottermole" was later voted the best mystery of all time by critics in 1949. Having so closely tied his literature to Limehouse, illuminating an otherwise relatively unknown community, historians have noted that Burke's popularity correlated with the presence of the Chinese population in the district, leading to a significant decline in his notability in the decades following his death.

== Biographical inaccuracies ==
Any attempt to accurately describe Thomas Burke's life is severely complicated by the many fictionalised accounts of his youth that circulated widely during his lifetime. Burke himself was principally responsible for fabricating and disseminating these autobiographical stories, which he used to bolster his authorial claim to an intimate knowledge of life among the lower-classes. As literary critic Anne Witchard notes, most of what we know about Burke's life is based on works that "purport to be autobiographical [and] yet contain far more invention than truth".

For instance, although he grew up in the suburbs, Thomas Burke claims in his autobiographical novel The Wind and the Rain: A Book of Confessions (1924) to have been born and raised in the East End, a lower-working class area of London. Furthermore, in this work he states that while growing up as an orphan in the East End he befriended a Chinese shopkeeper named Quong Lee from whom he learned about Chinese life in London. Burke also told newspaper reporters that he had "sat at the feet of Chinese philosophers who kept opium dens to learn from the lips that could frame only broken English, the secrets, good and evil, of the mysterious East."

These romanticised tales of Burke's early life were often accepted by the literary critics of the day and went largely unchallenged by his contemporaries. Although Burke's later writing, including the book Son of London more accurately describes his youth in the suburbs, the majority of his autobiographies attest to his supposedly intimate knowledge of working class life. These fabricated autobiographies enabled Burke to establish his authority as an expert on the Chinese in London, allowing him to create a persona that he used to market his fictional works on Limehouse. As Witchard notes, Burke, through his writing, positioned himself as a "seer" in an "occult process" of representing London's Chinese immigrant community.

== Critical reception ==
Burke's critical reception is as concentrated on Limehouse Nights as his public reception. Consensus is largely positive, praise coming from such notable authors as H. G. Wells and Arnold Bennett. Even negative reviews tend to be tempered by acknowledgement for Burke's craft. Critic Gilbert Seldes, for instance, wrote:

"Possibly Mr. Burke's books, at once vigorous and wanton, may be respected afterward; one fears only that they will be found a little purposeless, a little lacking in social direction. It is that lack, of course, which makes them so attractive. For, it may be mentioned, these are wonderfully good things to read."

More ecstatic reviewers echo critic Milton Bronner's favourable comparison: "Not since the days when Kipling burst upon the English word has any writer displayed more sheer power and driving force". Unlike Rudyard Kipling, who wrote at the height of empire in distant India, however, recent interpretation suggests Burke found critical success by writing about 'exotic' subject material at home, providing an escape for a public caught in the unprecedented brutality of World War I.

Reviews of Burke's many other works are more mixed, and always overshadowed by the controversial and successful Limehouse Nights. Twinkletoes, published a year later in 1918, rode on the same wave of approval. More Limehouse Nights in 1921 was also generally well received, but Burke was increasingly criticised for repetition. As critic John Gunther remarked, "[it] may be true that London is big enough to stand nine books about her from one hand. But that hand should be a bigger one than Thomas Burke's". While critical interest in Burke is now typically sparse, when recognised he is still regarded favourably as a modernist author.

=== Burke's reception in the United States ===
Burke's work, particularly Limehouse Nights, was extremely positive, with cinematographer Karl Brown stating in his 1973 work Adventures With D. W. Griffith that: "The whole English-reading world knew every dark and dangerous alley of Limehouse as well as they knew the way to the corner grocery."

The American filmmaker D. W. Griffith used Burke's short story "The Chink and the Child" from Limehouse Nights as basis for his silent film Broken Blossoms (1919). The film was equivalent in size, style, and prominence to a contemporary blockbuster. Griffith paid one thousand pounds for rights to the story, which was a huge sum at the time. This raised the public's awareness of the Limehouse district and the poverty in London. The film was remade in 1936.

Other film adaptations have been based on Burke's stories as well. Charlie Chaplin derived A Dog's Life (1918) from Limehouse Nights, and Burke's book Twinkletoes (1926) was made into a movie of the same name, starring Colleen Moore, Tully Marshall, Gladys Brockwell, Lucien Littlefield, and Warner Oland, directed by Charles Brabin. Maurice Elvey's Curlytop (1924) combines a number of Limehouse scenes and other stories of Burke's were also used as material for Alfred Hitchcock Presents. The 1949 British spiv film No Way Back is based on Burke's Beryl and the Croucher.

== Literary works ==
Thomas Burke considered himself to be a true Londoner both by birth and in spirit, and the large majority of his writings are concerned with the everyday life in London. The settings and peoples of working class London became an important element in Burke's work, and lower class setting and character 'types' are repeatedly used in both his fictional and non-fictional essays. Burke's writing follows in the tradition of James Greenwood and Jack London with his non-fiction, journalistic representation of London streets and the people in them. Burke gained recognition with his first book, Nights in Town, in 1915. Limehouse Nights was his first popular success, though it was largely a repetition of the same material in Nights in Town, only in fiction form.

Burke has in fact used the same material to produce different genres of writing—as essays in Nights Town: A London Autobiography, as fictional short stories in Limehouse Nights, as a novel in Twinkletoes, and as poetry in The Song Book of Quong Lee of Limehouse. Though the majority of Burke's writing was concerned with London, and more specifically the East End and the Limehouse district, Burke also published several eclectic and "uncharacteristic" pieces. With Night-Pieces (1935) and Murder at Elstree or Mr. Thurtell and His Gig, Burke tried his hand at horror fiction. In contrast to this, Burke also published The Beauty of England (1933) and The English Inn (1930), which depict England's countryside, and The Outer Circle, which contains a series of ramblings about the London suburbs. In 1901 "The Bellamy Diamonds" was published in Spare Moments "which every week offered a guinea for the best short story sent in" (169).

=== Literary style and Yellow Peril ===
Burke's literary style blended several writing conventions to create a dramatic portrait of London. Limehouse Nights and its various sequels classified Burke as a "purveyor of melodramatic stories of lust and murder among London's lower classes". Both his essays and fiction, focusing particularly on Limehouse Nights, are characterised, seemingly paradoxically, with harsh realities and more romanticised, poetic outlooks. Ultimately, Burke's style is that of a blend of realism and romanticism. Burke's first-hand knowledge (though overstated in his fictional autobiographies) and love for the city of London enabled Burke to write intimately about London life. Burke was also influenced by the work of Thomas De Quincey, and many of his writings that focus on the Limehouse district bear a resemblance to De Quincey's Confessions of an English Opium-Eater.

Scholars have also analysed how the depiction of the Chinese immigrant community in Limehouse Nights related to the Yellow Peril, a racial colour-metaphor for East Asians which posed them as a fundamental threat to the Western world. Scholar Anne Witchard argued that Burke's works displayed, in contrast to the majority of Western depictions of Chinese immigrants "what seems in the light of its day, and in contrast with Sax Rohmer's Fu Manchu thrillers, an unusual racial tolerance", noting the "absence of moral censure regarding miscegenation" in Limehouse Nights.

== Nonfiction works ==
In addition to his autobiographical Nights in Town, Thomas Burke wrote a non-fictional account of Chinatown in his book Out and About. In the chapter entitled "Chinatown Revisited" Burke elaborates on a visit in 1919 to the Limehouse district. While there with a friend, Coburn, Burke discovers that the Limehouse he wrote about in Limehouse Nights has disappeared. He explains that the crime, sex, and violence characteristic of Limehouse has been regulated by the local police. No longer present was the life of the Chinese district that Burke had created. As he notes, "the glamorous shame of Chinatown has departed".

Thomas Burke's later nonfictional works, as analysed by Matt Houlbrook in Queer London, examine, if only in an indirect way, London's homosexual communities. In 1922, Burke published The London Spy: A Book of Town Travels, part of which describes the male homosexual relationship as existing within the public spaces of the city: "Only in the misty corners of the thickening streets…can [homosexual couples] attain the solitude they seek…For the young lover…the street is more private than the home."

In 1937, Burke published For Your Convenience: A Learned Dialogue Instructive to all Londoners and London Visitors. Burke's nonfictional account, according to Houlbrook, "offers an ironic—if heavily veiled—indictment of contemporary sexual mores", and again establishes public, rather than private spaces, particularly urinals, as the sites of homosexual desire. By providing a verbal and visual map of London with the locations of urinals clearly marked, Burke "[formalizes] men's knowledge of these sexual possibilities" and "[codifies] their knowledge of the tactics needed to use these sites safely". Burke's work as an urban observer thus allows him to map the public world of London's queer and to reflect upon the extent to which interaction with London's public landmarks engaged homosexual communities in an historical narrative of identity formation.

== Secondary bibliography ==
- R. Thurston Hopkins, "In the Footsteps of Thomas Burke", Chapter XIII of London Pilgrimages (London: Brentano's, 1928), pp. 193–210.
- Barry Milligan, Pleasures and Pains: Opium and the Orient in Nineteenth-Century British Culture (Charlottesville & London: UP of Virginia, 1995).
- George A. Wade, "The Cockney John Chinaman", The English Illustrated Magazine (July 1900): 301–07.
- Anne Witchard, "Aspects of Literary Limehouse: Thomas Burke and the 'Glamorous Shame of Chinatown", Literary London: Interdisciplinary Studies in the Representation of London, 2, 2 (September 2004): 7 pp. http://homepages.gold.ac.uk/london-journal/september%202004/witchard.html.

== Adaptations ==
=== The League of Extraordinary Gentlemen ===
Quong Lee, portrayed a tea-shop owner in Down East Limehouse, makes a brief cameo in the first volume of Alan Moore's The League of Extraordinary Gentlemen, where he delivers the protagonists veiled hints about the "Devil Doctor's" machinations.
