= The Middle Watch (1930 film) =

1930 film

- Owen Nares, Jacqueline Logan and Jack Raine in a scene from the film.
- Directed by: Norman Walker
- Written by: Ian Hay (play); Stephen King-Hall (play); Frank Launder; Norman Walker
- Produced by: John Maxwell
- Starring: Owen Nares; Jacqueline Logan; Jack Raine; Dodo Watts
- Cinematography: Jack E. Cox; Claude Friese-Greene
- Edited by: Emile de Ruelle; Sam Simmonds
- Production company: British International Pictures
- Distributed by: Wardour Films
- Release date: 24 October 1930
- Running time: 72 minutes
- Country: United Kingdom
- Language: English

The Middle Watch is a 1930 British comedy film directed by Norman Walker and starring Owen Nares, Jacqueline Logan, Jack Raine and Dodo Watts. It was written by Frank Launder and Norman Walker based on the 1930 play of the same name by Ian Hay and Stephen King-Hall.

The film was made by British International Pictures at its Elstree Studios, with sets designed by John Mead. It was remade in 1940 by the same company.

== Plot ==
After a dance on board a naval cruiser, Mary Carlton and Fay Eaton are stranded aboard and are given beds in the Captain's cabin. Then Admiral Sir Herbert Hewitt comes aboard and the ship puts to sea to rescue a stricken yacht with the Admiral's wife and daughter aboard. The Captain has to find accommodation for the Admiral, and farcial maritime shenannigans ensue.

== Cast ==
- Owen Nares as Captain Maitland
- Jacqueline Logan as Mary Carlton
- Jack Raine as Commander Baddeley
- Dodo Watts as Fay Eaton
- Frederick Volpe as Admiral Sir Herbert Hewitt
- Henry Wenman as Marine Ogg
- Reginald Purdell as Corporal Duckett
- Margaret Halstan as Lady Agatha Hewitt
- Phyllis Loring as Nancy Hewitt
- Hamilton Keene as Captain Randall
- Muriel Aked as Charlotte Hopkinson
- George Carr as Ah Fong
- Syd Crossley as sentry

== Reception ==
Film Weekly wrote: "If you want to see British film-making at its best and brightest, The Middle Watch is your picture. It has been very cleverly directed by Norman Walker, who has apparently delighted in its strong naval flavour. Comedy and romance are successfully mingled, while the clever acting, real sea settings and charming story all help to provide an extremely enjoyable en entertainment."

Kine Weekly wrote: "A bright, piquant and refreshing nautical comedy, cleverly directed and is notable for the all-round excellence of the acting. Despite its length, the rich, clean humour flows steadily, and there is never a dull moment. An excellent attraction."

The Daily Film Renter wrote: "The finest naval farce ever screened in this country. Talkie version of famous West End stage piece, which is better than play itself. 'Bedroom farce' at sea with a laugh at every corner. Excellent cast, headed by Jacqueline Logan and Owen Nares, and brilliantly handled by Norman Walker, gives superbly humorous translation of strong comedy situations devised by Ian Hay and Stephen King-Hall."
