= Limehouse Nights =

1916 short story by Thomas Burke

Limehouse Nights is a 1916 short story collection by the British writer Thomas Burke. The stories are set in and around the Chinatown that was then centred on Limehouse in the East End of London. The book was a popular success and features several of Burke's best-known stories such as "The Chink and the Child" and "Beryl and the Croucher".

== Film adaptations ==
Four films have been based upon stories collected in Limehouse Nights. The story "The Chink and the Child" was turned into the 1919 film Broken Blossoms directed by D.W. Griffith and its 1936 remake. The story "Twelve Golden Curls" became the film Curlytop in 1924. "Beryl and the Croucher" was filmed in 1949 as No Way Back and set in the contemporary East End as part of the Spiv cycle of films made in the years following the Second World War.

== George Gershwin ==
Limehouse Nights was the inspiration for an eponymous piano piece by the renowned American composer George Gershwin.

== Bibliography ==
- Limehouse Nights London: Grant Richards, 1916, 1923
- Limehouse Nights New York: Robert M. McBride, 1917
- Limehouse Nights London: Daily Express Fiction Library, undated [1936-1940]
- Limehouse Nights New York: Horizon Press, 1973
