= Patrick MacGill =

Irish journalist, poet and novelist

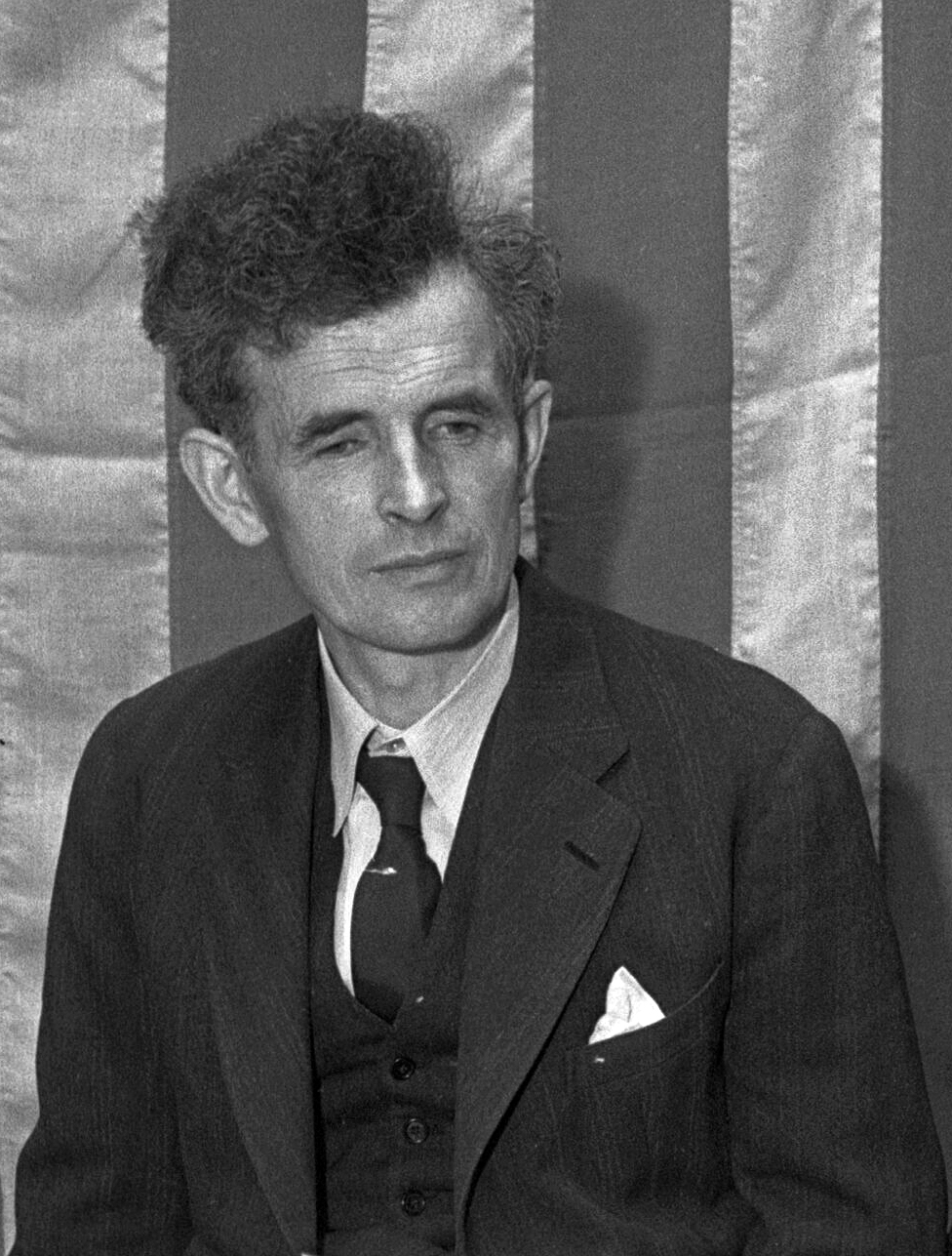
Patrick MacGill

Patrick MacGill (c. 1890* – 23 November 1963) was an Irish journalist, poet and novelist, known as "The Navvy Poet" because he had worked as a navvy before he began writing.

*Usually stated as between 24 December 1889 and 1 January 1890

== Personal life ==
MacGill was born in Glenties, County Donegal. A statue in his honour is on the bridge where the main street crosses the river in Glenties. He had three children, Christine, Patricia and Sheila MacGill. He died in Florida aged 73 and was buried in Fall River, Massachusetts.

== Military service ==
During the First World War, MacGill served with the London Irish Rifles (1/18th Battalion, The London Regiment) and was wounded at the Battle of Loos on 28 October 1915. He was recruited into military intelligence, and wrote for MI 7b between 1916 and the Armistice in 1918.

MacGill wrote a memoir-type novel called Children of the Dead End. as well as several other works during the war.

== Legacy ==
In early 2008, a docu-drama starring Stephen Rea was made about the life of Patrick MacGill, which was released in Ireland in 2009 as Child of the Dead End. One of the film's locations was the boathouse of Edinburgh Canal Society at Edinburgh on the Union Canal, and one of its rowing boats.

An annual literary event, the Patrick MacGill Festival, is held in Glenties in his honour.

== Bibliography ==
=== Novels ===
- Children of the Dead End: The Autobiography of a Navvy (London: Herbert Jenkins 1914; London: Caliban 1982; Edinburgh: Birlinn 2000, Edinburgh: Birlinn Limited, 2022, ISBN 978-1-78027-764-6
- The Rat-Pit (London: Herbert Jenkins 1915; London: Caliban 1982)
- The Amateur Army (London: Herbert Jenkins 1915)
- The Red Horizon (London: Herbert Jenkins 1916; London: Caliban 1984)
- The Great Push: An Episode in the Great War (London: Herbert Jenkins 1916; ; London: Caliban 1984; Edinburgh: Birlinn 2000)
- The Brown Brethren (London: Herbert Jenkins 1917)
- [as John O’Gorman] The Dough-Boys (London: Herbert Jenkins 1919)
- The Diggers: The Australians in France, foreword by W. M. Hughes, Australian PM (London: Herbert Jenkins 1919)

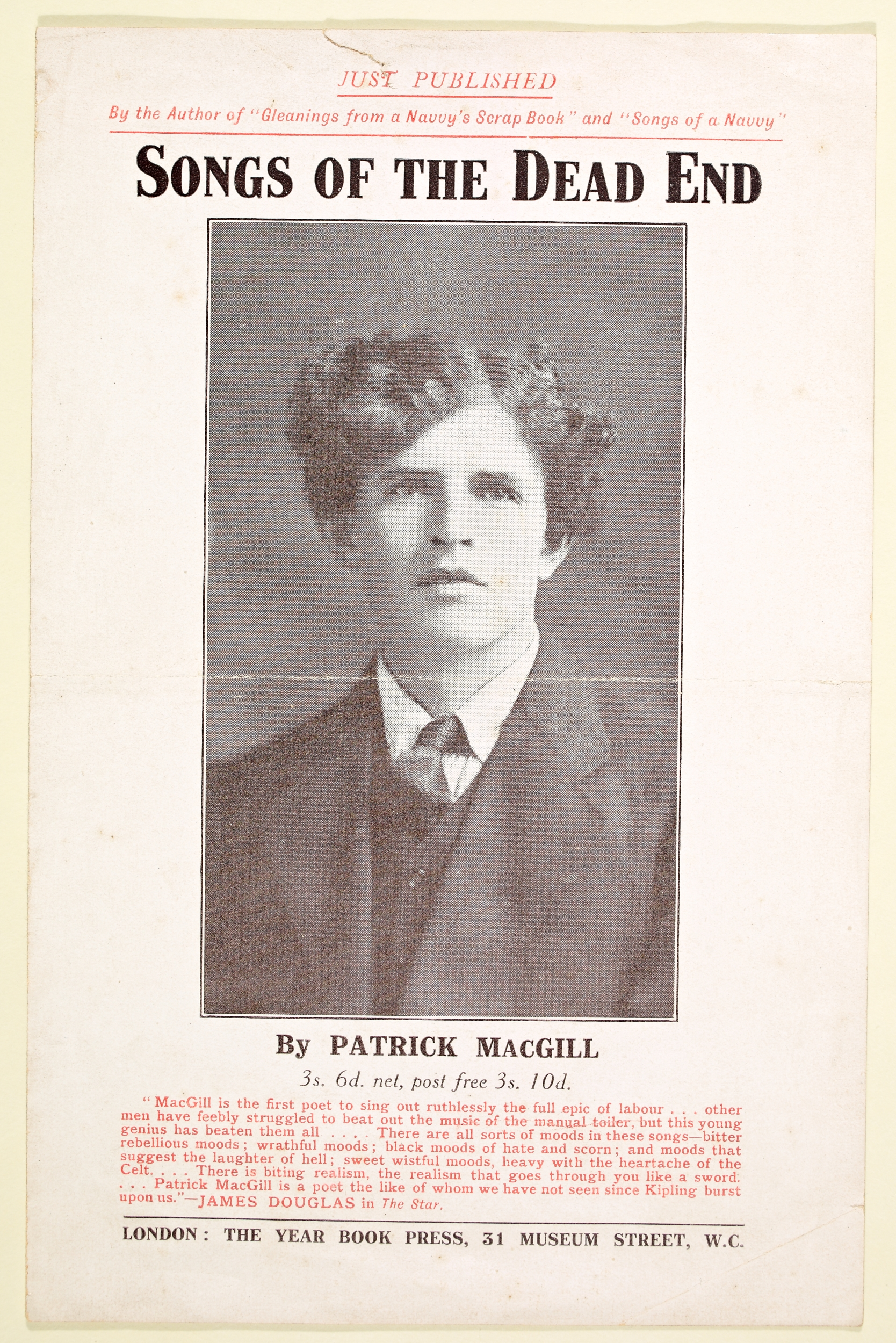

- Glenmornan (London: Herbert Jenkins 1919; London: Caliban 1983)
- Maureen (London: Herbert Jenkins 1920)
- Fear! (London: Herbert Jenkins 1921)
- Lanty Hanlon: A Comedy of Irish Life (London: Herbert Jenkins 1922)
- Moleskin Joe (London: Herbert Jenkins 1923; London: Caliban 1983)
- The Carpenter of Orra (London: Herbert Jenkins 1924)
- Sid Puddiefoot (London: Herbert Jenkins 1926)
- Una Cassidy (London: Herbert Jenkins 1928)
- Tulliver’s Mill (London: Herbert Jenkins 1934)
- The Glen of Carra (London: Herbert Jenkins 1934)
- The House at the World's End (London: Herbert Jenkins 1935)
- Helen Spenser (London: Herbert Jenkins 1937)

=== Poetry ===
- Gleanings from a Navvy's Scrapbook (Derry: Derry Journal 1910)
- Songs of a Navvy (Windsor: P. MacGill 1911)
- Songs of the Dead End (London: Year Book Press 1912)
- Soldier Songs (London: Herbert Jenkins 1917)
- Songs of Donegal (London: Herbert Jenkins 1921)
- The Navvy Poet: Collected Poetry of Patrick MacGill (London: Caliban 1984) [Songs of Donegal; Songs of the Dead End; Soldier Songs]

=== Plays ===
- Moleskin Joe (1921)
- Suspense: A Play in Three Acts (London: Herbert Jenkins, 1930)

== In The Morning ==
MacGill wrote several poems during the first world war about the realities of life on the frontline. His poem In The Morning, written after the Battle of Loos in 1915, reflects on the destruction and loss of life in wars.

== Adaptations, tributes, and related works ==
Irish fiddle player Gráinne Brady released an album titled The Road Across the Hills in 2019 to accompany Children of the Dead End.
