= Raise the Roof (film) =

1930 film directed by Walter Summers

- Theatrical release poster
- Directed by: Walter Summers
- Written by: Philip MacDonald; Walter Summers
- Produced by: Walter Summers
- Starring: Betty Balfour; Maurice Evans; Jack Raine
- Cinematography: René Guissart
- Production company: British International Pictures
- Distributed by: Pathé Pictures
- Release date: February 1930
- Running time: 77 minutes
- Country: United Kingdom
- Language: English

Raise the Roof is a 1930 British musical film directed by Walter Summers and starring Betty Balfour, Maurice Evans, and Jack Raine. It was written by Philip MacDonald and Summers.

== Cast ==
- Betty Balfour as Maisie Grey
- Maurice Evans as Rodney Langford
- Jack Raine as Atherley Armitage
- Sam Livesey as Mr. Langford
- Ellis Jeffreys as Mrs. Langford
- Arthur Hardy as Croxley Bellairs
- Dorothy Minto as Juanita
- Charles Garry as Deighton Duff
- Mike Johnson as Fred Frisco
- Louie Emery as Mrs. Warburton
- Andreas Malandrinos as Pedro
- Josephine Earle as Queenie Quern
- Harry Hilliard as Colin Calquon

== Production ==
The film was made at Elstree Studios with sets designed by the art director John Mead.

== Reception ==
Kine Weekly wrote: "Waiter Summers is responsible for clever directorial touches, and has succeeded in creating a really good atmosphere, but fails to bring conviction to the story. The idea of a touring company being entirely remodelled in an afternoon and turned into a success is pushing dramatic licence to its limits. Betty Balfour, too, is called upon to shoulder too much, and is not sufticiently entertaining in herself to outweigh the improbabilities. The by-play, however, is at times most amusing, and there is a love theme which is delicately handled and never over-stressed."
