= Broken Blossoms =

1919 film by D. W. Griffith

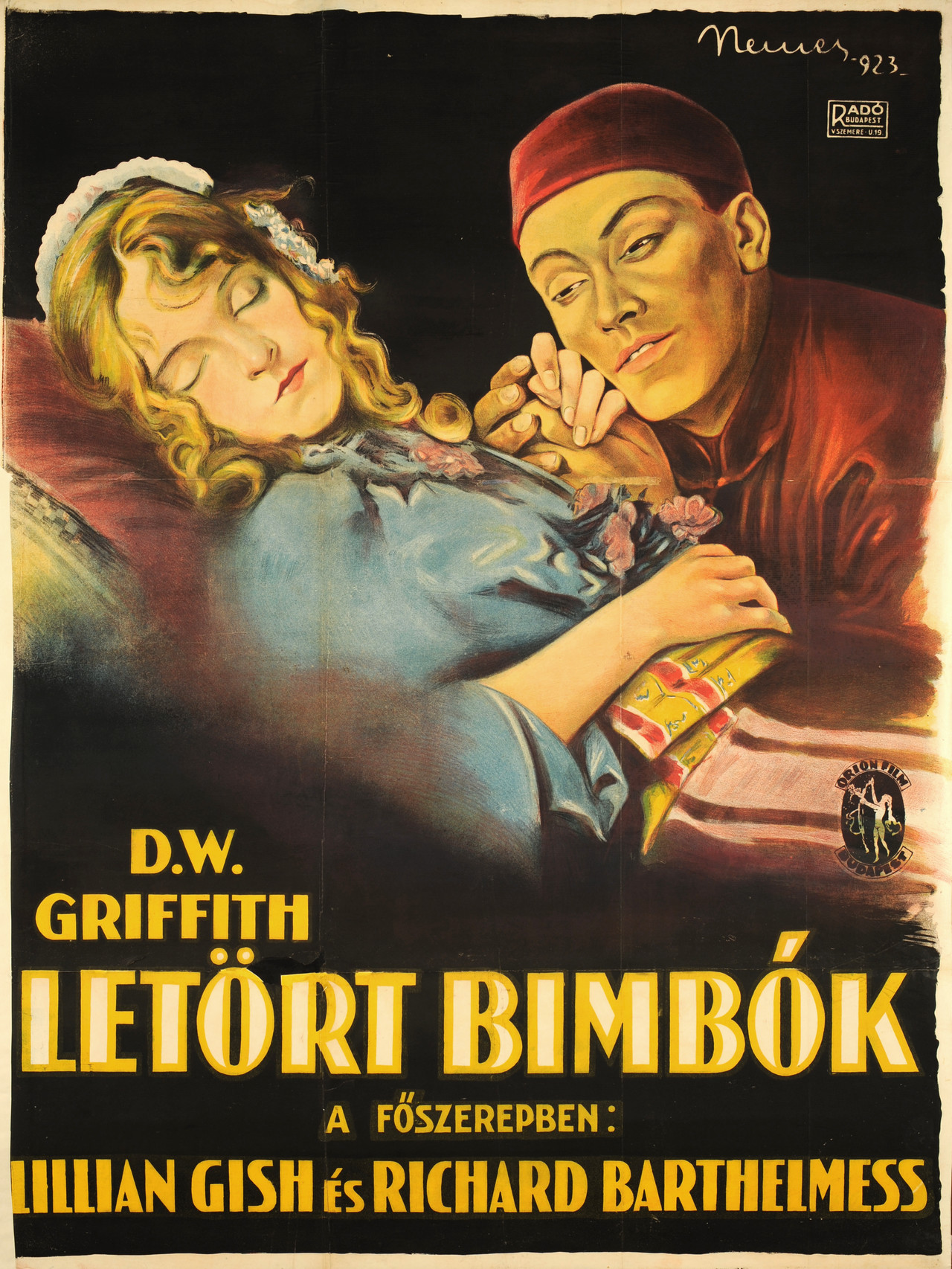
- Hungarian Theatrical release poster
- Directed by: D. W. Griffith
- Screenplay by: D. W. Griffith
- Based on: "The Chink and the Child" by Thomas Burke
- Produced by: D. W. Griffith
- Starring: Lillian Gish; Richard Barthelmess; Donald Crisp
- Cinematography: G. W. Bitzer
- Edited by: James Smith
- Distributed by: United Artists
- Release dates: May 13, 1919 (New York City, premiere); October 20, 1919 (U.S.)
- Running time: 90 minutes
- Country: U.S.
- Language: Silent (English intertitles)
- Budget: $88,000 or $115,000
- Box office: $600,000 (U.S.) or $1.25 million

Broken Blossoms or The Yellow Man and the Girl, often referred to simply as Broken Blossoms, is a 1919 American silent melodrama film directed by D. W. Griffith. It was distributed by United Artists and premiered on May 13, 1919. It stars Lillian Gish, Richard Barthelmess, and Donald Crisp, and tells the story of a young girl, Lucy Burrows, who is abused by her alcoholic prizefighting father, Battling Burrows, and meets Cheng Huan, a kind-hearted Chinese man who falls in love with her. It was the first film distributed by United Artists. It is based on Thomas Burke's short story "The Chink and the Child" from the 1916 collection Limehouse Nights. In 1996, Broken Blossoms was selected for preservation in the United States National Film Registry by the Library of Congress, being deemed "culturally, historically, or aesthetically significant".

== Plot ==
Broken Blossoms

Cheng Huan leaves his native China because he "dreams to spread the gentle message of Buddha to the Anglo-Saxon lands." His idealism fades as he is faced with the brutal reality of London's gritty inner-city. However, his mission is finally realized in his devotion to the "broken blossom" Lucy Burrows, the beautiful but unwanted and abused daughter of boxer Battling Burrows.

After being beaten and discarded one evening by her raging father, Lucy finds sanctuary in Cheng's home, the beautiful and exotic room above his shop. As Cheng nurses Lucy back to health, the two form a bond as two unwanted outcasts of society. All goes astray for them when Lucy's father gets wind of his daughter's whereabouts and in a drunken rage drags her back to their home to punish her. Fearing for her life, Lucy locks herself inside a closet to escape her contemptuous father.

By the time Cheng arrives to rescue Lucy, whom he so innocently adores, it is too late. Lucy's lifeless body lies on her modest bed as Battling has a drink in the other room. As Cheng gazes at Lucy's youthful face which, in spite of the circumstances, beams with innocence and even the slightest hint of a smile, Battling enters the room to make his escape. The two stand for a long while, exchanging spiteful glances, until Battling lunges for Cheng with a hatchet, and Cheng retaliates by shooting Burrows repeatedly with his handgun. After returning to his home with Lucy's body, Cheng builds a shrine to the Buddha and takes his own life with a knife to the chest.

== Cast ==
- Lillian Gish as Lucy Burrows
- Richard Barthelmess as Cheng Huan
- Donald Crisp as "Battling" Burrows
- Arthur Howard as Burrows' manager
- Edward Peil Sr. as "Evil Eye"
- George Beranger as the spying one
- Norman Selby (aka Kid McCoy) as a prizefighter
- Steve Murphy as fight spectator

== Production and style ==
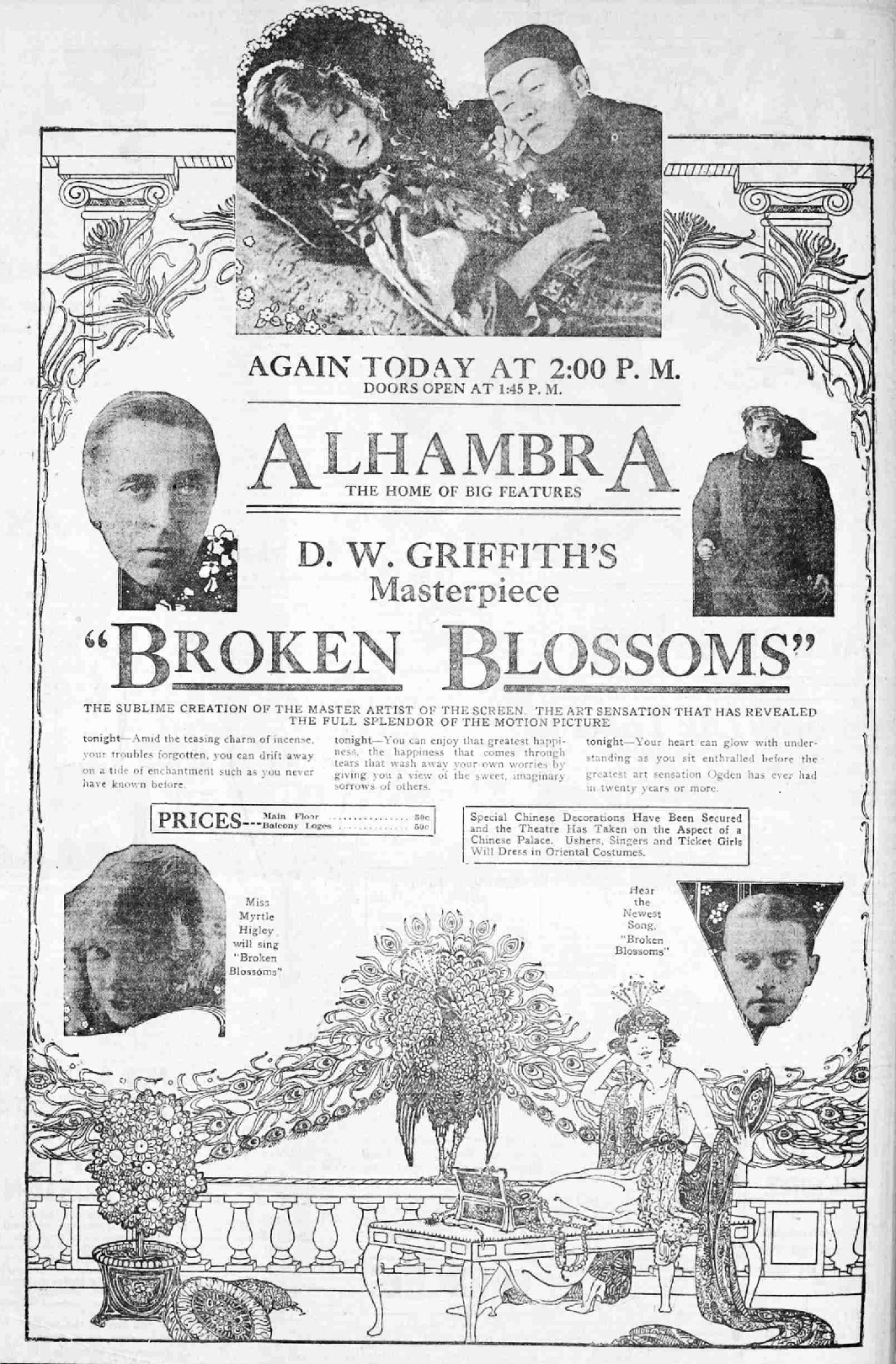
Newspaper advertisement for the film

Unlike Griffith's more extravagant earlier works like The Birth of a Nation or Intolerance, Broken Blossoms is a small-scale film that uses controlled studio environments, to create a more intimate "impressionistic" effect, reminiscent of the "impressionist school of painting". Shot entirely in the studio, Broken Blossoms is notable in that most of Hollywood productions at the time "relied heavily on location work to provide any kind of effective atmosphere". (Note: O'Dell also notes the film's "great atmospherics" on page 124.) The visual style of Broken Blossoms emphasizes the seedy Limehouse streets with their dark shadows, drug addicts, and drunkards, contrasting them with the beauty of Cheng and Lucy's innocent attachment as expressed by Cheng's decorative apartment. Conversely, the Burrows' bare cell reeks of oppression and hostility. Film critic and historian Richard Schickel goes so far as to credit this gritty realism with inspiring "the likes of Pabst, Stiller, von Sternberg, and others, [and then] re-emerging in the United States in the sound era, in the genre identified as Film Noir".

Griffith was known for his willingness to collaborate with his actors and on many occasions join them in research outings. As such, Broken Blossoms is "the fusion of directorial and acting style."

Griffith was unsure of his final product and took several months to complete the editing, saying: "I can't look at the damn thing; it depresses me so."

== Box office ==
The film was originally made for Famous Players–Lasky. The company sold it to the newly founded United Artists for $250,000. The film turned out to be a hit at the box office and earned a profit of $700,000. It was the first film ever distributed by United Artists.

== Reception ==
The enthusiasm which Broken Blossoms awakened in 1919 can hardly be overstated; Griffith was everywhere felt to have opened up new dimensions in the cinema and raised it to a level of great tragic art.

— Edward Wagenknecht, The Movies in the Age of Innocence (1962)

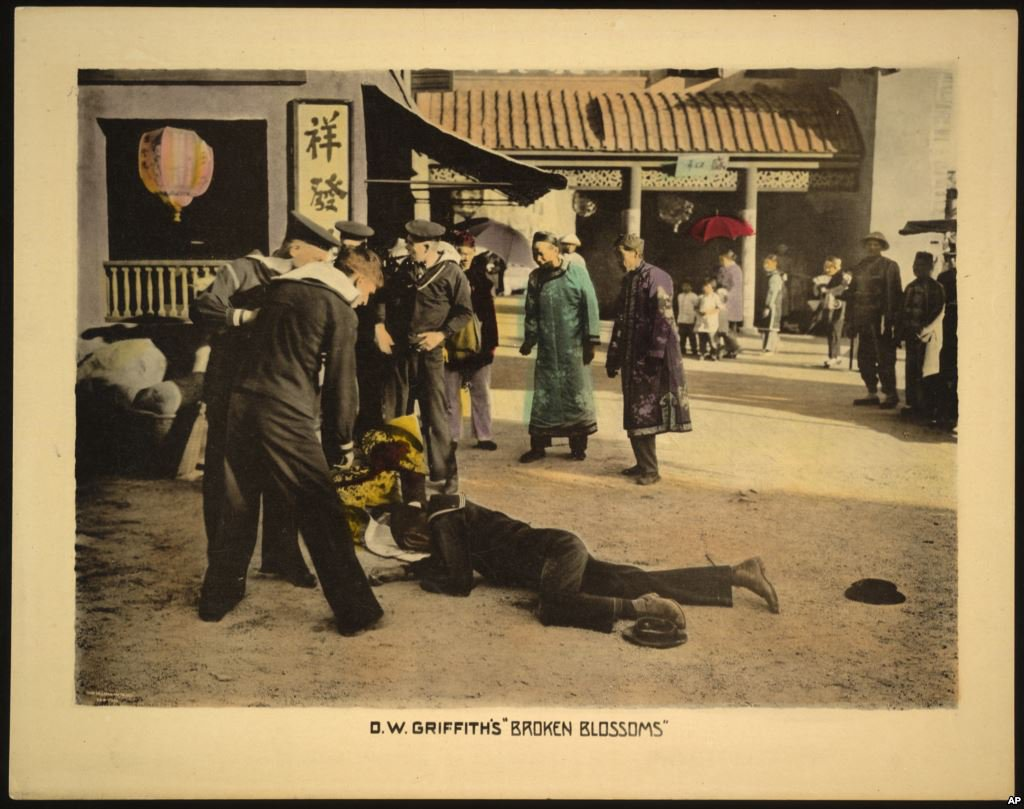
Lobby card for the film, showing the early scene in which drunken Western sailors fight on a street in China

Broken Blossoms premiered in May 1919, at George M. Cohan's Theatre in New York City as part of the D. W. Griffith Repertory Season. According to Lillian Gish's autobiography, theaters were decorated with flowers, moon lanterns and beautiful Chinese brocaded draperies for the premiere. Critics and audiences were pleased with Griffith's follow-up film to his 1916 epic Intolerance. Contrasting with Intolerance's grand story, set and length, Griffith charmed audiences by the delicacy with which Broken Blossoms handled such a complex subject.

Reviewers found it "Surprising in its simplicity"...the acting seemed nine days' wonder – no one talked of anything but Lillian's smile, Lillian turned like a tormented animal in a trap, of Barthelmess' convincing restraint. Few pictures have enjoyed greater or more lasting succès d'estime."

The scenes of child abuse nauseated backers when Griffith gave them a preview of the film; according to Lillian Gish in interviews, a Variety reporter invited to sit in on a second take left the room to vomit.

Today, Broken Blossoms is widely regarded as one of Griffith's finest works. In 2012, the film received five critics' votes and one director's vote in the British Film Institute's decennial Sight & Sound poll. Roger Ebert was a longtime champion of the film, having added it to his "Great Movies" series; and in 1996, it was selected for preservation in the United States National Film Registry by the Library of Congress as being "culturally, historically, or aesthetically significant".

Review aggregation site They Shoot Pictures, Don't They has since found Broken Blossoms to be the 261st most acclaimed film in history.

Unbroken Blossoms, a play about the making of the film told from the perspective of the two Chinese American consultants hired to work on the project, premiered at East West Players in Summer 2024.

== Themes ==
If Lillian Gish's performance in Broken Blossoms is to be counted among her greatest film roles, then the performance of Richard Barthelmess is her perfect complement. Cheng Huan is portrayed as a deeply reverent and compassionate man, whose love for peace is equaled only by his love for beauty. He finds both qualities when he shelters Lucy from the savageries of Burrows. In the end he is corrupted by the forces that surround him...Too late to save Lucy, too late to save even himself, he throws himself into an uneven struggle with determination and courage, the final and ultimate sacrifice to Lucy and their spiritual happiness.

— Film historian Paul O'Dell, Griffith and the Rise of Hollywood (1970)

Cruelty and injustice against the innocent are a recurring theme in Griffith's films and are graphically portrayed here. The introductory card says, "We may believe there are no Battling Burrows, striking the helpless with brutal whip — but do we not ourselves use the whip of unkind words and deeds? So, perhaps, Battling may even carry a message of warning."

Broken Blossoms was released during a period of strong anti-Chinese feeling in the U.S., a fear known as the Yellow Peril. The phrase "Yellow Peril" was common in the U.S. newspapers owned by William Randolph Hearst. It was also the title of a popular book by an influential U.S. religious figure, G. G. Rupert, who published The Yellow Peril; or, Orient vs. Occident in 1911. Griffith changed Burke's original story to promote a message of tolerance. In Burke's story, the Chinese protagonist is a sordid young Shanghai drifter pressed into naval service, who frequents opium dens and brothels; in the film, he becomes a Buddhist missionary whose initial goal is to spread the word of Buddha and peace (although he is also shown frequenting opium dens when he is depressed). Even at his lowest point, he still prevents his gambling companions from fighting.

Literary critic Edward Wagenknecht places Broken Blossoms thematically among the works of Shakespeare and the ancient Greek dramatists, "who wrought their material out of sordid material."

Broken Blossom might have been merely a subtly lighted, skillfully directed slum melodrama [but] was lifted into a world of aesthetic purity and clarity, so that the audience went away uplifted as well as terrified. (Note: Wagenknecht also describes the film as "an immense and brooding film.")

== The "closet scene" ==
The most-discussed scene in Broken Blossoms is Lillian Gish's "closet" scene. Here Gish performs Lucy's horror by writhing in the claustrophobic space like a tortured animal who knows there is no escape. There is more than one anecdote about the filming of the "closet" scene, Richard Schickel writes:

It is heartbreaking – yet for the most part quite delicately controlled by the actress. Barthelmess reports that her hysteria was induced by Griffith's taunting of her. Gish, on her part, claims that she improvised the child's tortured movements on the spot and that when she finished the scene there was a hush on stage, broken finally by Griffith's exclamation, "My God, why didn't you warn me you were going to do that?"

The scene is also used to demonstrate Griffith's uncanny ability to create an aural effect with only an image. Gish's screams apparently attracted such a crowd outside the studio that people needed to be held back.

== Remakes ==
A UK remake, also titled Broken Blossoms, followed in 1936. It was remade in Japan twice, both set in Yokohama's Chinatown. A 1959 version was known as 戦場のなでしこ (Senjō no Nadeshiko, Nadeshiko on the Battlefield), directed by Teruo Ishii for Shintoho.
