= Jack Raine =

English actor (1897–1979)

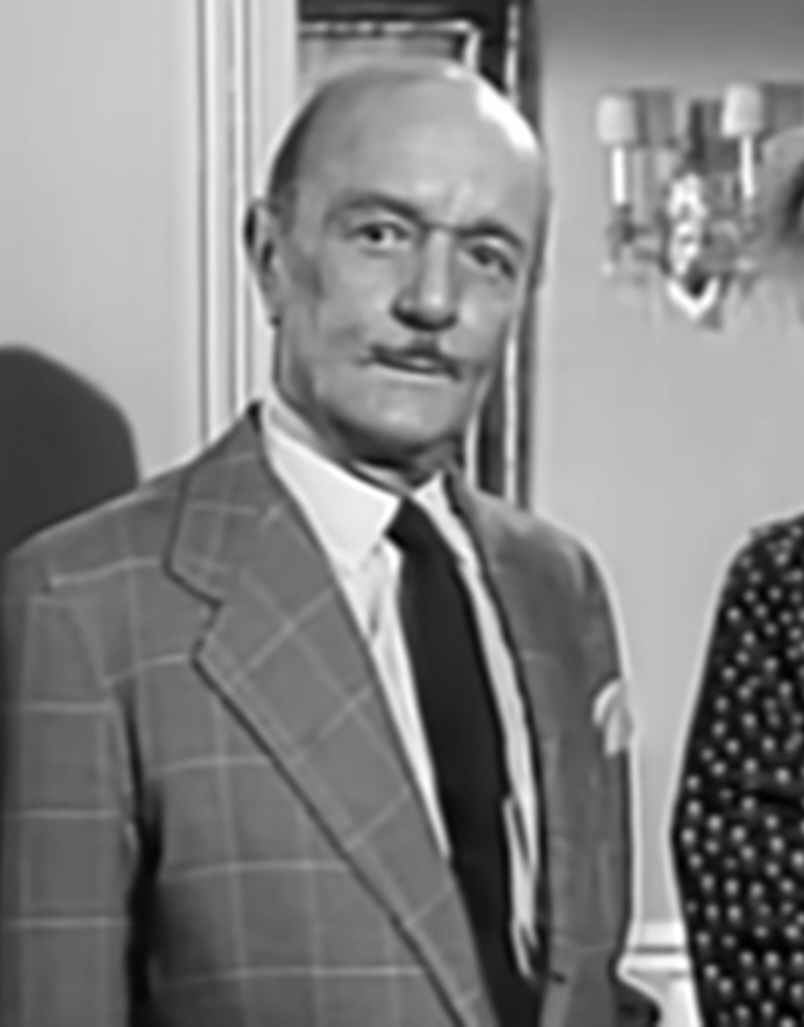
- Raine in an episode of One Step Beyond (1959)
- Born: Thomas Foster Raine; 18 May 1897; Hendon, England
- Died: 30 May 1979 (aged 82); South Laguna, California, US
- Occupation: Actor
- Years active: 1920–1971
- Spouse(s): Binnie Hale (m. 1924; div. 1934) Sonia Phyllis Bellamy; Theodora Moreau Wilson

Thomas "Jack" Foster Raine (18 May 1897 – 30 May 1979) was an English stage, television and film actor.

== Career ==
Raine was a leading man of the British cinema in the late 1920s and early 1930s, in such films as The Hate Ship (1929), Raise the Roof, Suspense, Night Birds and The Middle Watch (all 1930), before moving down the cast list and becoming a character actor. Throughout the thirties and forties he appeared in numerous supporting roles, usually as sturdy figures of authority, including The Ghoul (1933), The Clairvoyant (1934), Holiday Camp, Mine Own Executioner (both 1947) and Easy Money (1948). He also played Sir Graham Forbes in the first two Paul Temple films Send for Paul Temple (1946) and Calling Paul Temple (1948). One of his last British films was a rare co-starring role of this era in the 'B' movie No Way Back (1949), opposite Terence De Marney, in which he played against type as a small time gangster.

Like a lot of British actors during the 1950s, Raine made the move to Hollywood and enjoyed a career of character roles which continued into the seventies. These included Julius Caesar (1953), An Affair to Remember (1957), Witness for the Prosecution (both 1957), My Fair Lady (1964), Doctor Doolittle (1967), The Killing of Sister George (1968) and Bedknobs and Broomsticks (1971).

Television roles for Raine included Perry Mason, Mister Ed, 77 Sunset Strip, The Outer Limits, The Twilight Zone, Father Knows Best,The Man from U.N.C.L.E. and Ironside. He also portrayed Dr. Watson opposite Basil Rathbone's Sherlock Holmes on Broadway, after the passing of Rathbone's screen Watson, Nigel Bruce.

== Personal life ==
Raine was married to musical theatre actress Binnie Hale from 1924 until their divorce in 1934. He was subsequently married to Sonia Phyllis Bellamy and then Theodora Moreau Wilson.

== Selected filmography ==
- Piccadilly (1929) – Diner in Nightclub Scene (uncredited)
- The Hate Ship (1929) – Roger Peel
- Raise the Roof (1930) – Atherley Armitage
- Harmony Heaven (1930) – Stuart
- Suspense (1930) – Capt. Wilson
- Night Birds (1930) – Sgt. Harry Cross
- The Middle Watch (1930) – Cmdr. Baddeley
- Comets (1930) – Himself
- Fires of Fate (1932) – Filbert Frayne
- Her Night Out (1932) – Jim Hanley
- The Ghoul (1933) – Davis, the chauffeur (uncredited)
- Two Wives for Henry (1933) – Hugo Horsfal
- The House of Trent (1933) – Peter
- The Fortunate Fool (1933) – Gerald (credited as Jack Raines)
- Out of the Past (1933) – Eric Cotton
- Important People (1934) – George Pelling
- Love, Life and Laughter (1934) – Aide (uncredited)
- Dangerous Ground (1934) – Philip Tarry
- Red Ensign (1934) – Testing Official (uncredited)
- Little Friend (1934) – Jeffries
- Lilies of the Field (1934) – George Belwood
- Mimi (1935) – Duke
- Royal Cavalcade (1935) – Minor Role (uncredited)
- The Clairvoyant (1935) – Customs Officer (uncredited)
- Double or Quits (1938) – Roland
- Meet Mr. Penny (1938) – Preston
- Life of St. Paul (1938) – Pudens
- For Freedom (1940) – Cutter
- Girl in the News (1940) – Detective Smith (uncredited)
- Neutral Port (1940) – Alf
- Sailors Don't Care (1940) – Hotel Manager (uncredited)
- I Didn't Do It (1945) – J.B. Cato
- Send for Paul Temple (1946) – Sir Graham Forbes
- Just William's Luck (1947) – Detective No. 1
- Holiday Camp (1947) – District Superintendent (uncredited)
- Mine Own Executioner (1947) – Inspector Pierce
- Easy Money (1948) – Managing Director
- Just William's Luck (1948) – Police Sergeant
- Good-Time Girl (1948) – Detective Inspector Girton
- Calling Paul Temple (1948) – Sir Graham Forbes
- My Brother's Keeper (1948) – Chief Constable
- The Story of Shirley Yorke (1948) – Stansfield Yorke
- Quartet (1948) – Thomas (segment "The Facts of Life")
- No Way Back (1949) – Joe Sleat
- Holiday for Sinners (1952) – Dr. Surtees
- Les Misérables (1952) – Captain (uncredited)
- The Happy Time (1952) – Mr. Frye – School Principal
- Botany Bay (1952) – Governor's Aide (uncredited)
- Above and Beyond (1952) – Dr. Fiske
- Rogue's March (1953) – Gen. Woodbury
- The Story of Three Loves (1953) – Doctor (segment "The Jealous Lover") (uncredited)
- The Desert Rats (1953) – C.I.C. (uncredited)
- Julius Caesar (1953) – Trebonius
- Young Bess (1953) – Governor of Tower (uncredited)
- Dangerous When Wet (1953) – Stuart Frye
- Rhapsody (1954) – Edmund Streller
- Elephant Walk (1954) – Norbert (uncredited)
- Bengal Brigade (1954) – Col. Rivers (uncredited)
- The Silver Chalice (1954) – Magistrate (uncredited)
- Prince of Players (1955) – Theatre Manager (uncredited)
- Interrupted Melody (1955) – Mr. Norson (uncredited)
- Soldier of Fortune (1955) – Maj. Leith Phipps (uncredited)
- Moonfleet (1955) – Frame (uncredited)
- Not as a Stranger (1955) – Dr. Lettering
- How to Be Very, Very Popular (1955) – Speaker (uncredited)
- The Girl in the Red Velvet Swing (1955) – Mr. Finley (uncredited)
- D-Day the Sixth of June (1956) – Officer (uncredited)
- The Power and the Prize (1956) – Mr. Pitt-Semphill
- An Affair to Remember (1957) – British TV Commentator (uncredited)
- Witness for the Prosecution (1957) – Sir Wilfrid's doctor (uncredited)
- Compulsion (1959) – Professor McKinnon (uncredited)
- Woman Obsessed (1959) – Ian Campbell (uncredited)
- Taras Bulba (1962) – Mayor (uncredited)
- My Fair Lady (1964) – Extra (uncredited)
- The Americanization of Emily (1964) – Hotel Waiter (uncredited)
- Do Not Disturb (1965) – Bird Watcher (uncredited)
- Our Man Flint (1966) – English Diplomat (uncredited)
- Assault on a Queen (1966) – Bartender (uncredited)
- Doctor Dolittle (1967) – Vicar (uncredited)
- The Killing of Sister George (1968) – Deputy Commissioner
- Hello, Dolly! (1969) – Elderly Man (uncredited)
- Scandalous John (1971) – Switchman
- Bedknobs and Broomsticks (1971) – Old Home Guardsman (uncredited) (final film role)
