= The Call of the North =

The Call of the North may refer to:

- The Call of the North (1914 film), a 1914 American silent adventure-drama film
- The Call of the North (1921 film), a 1921 American silent film
- The Call of the North (1929 film), a 1929 German silent film
- The Call of the North, a 1908 play by George Broadhurst
- Call of the North, a 2023 album by Frozen Crown
