= Gilbert White (disambiguation) =

Gilbert White (1720–1793) was a pioneering English naturalist and ornithologist.

Gilbert White may also refer to:

- Gilbert White (bishop) (1859–1933), Bishop of Carpentaria, Australia, and poet
- Gilbert White (painter) (1877–1939), American painter
- Gilbert F. White (1911–2006), American geographer
- Gilbert White (British Army officer) (1912–1977), English cricketer and British Army officer
