= The Coming of Amos =

1925 film by Paul Sloane

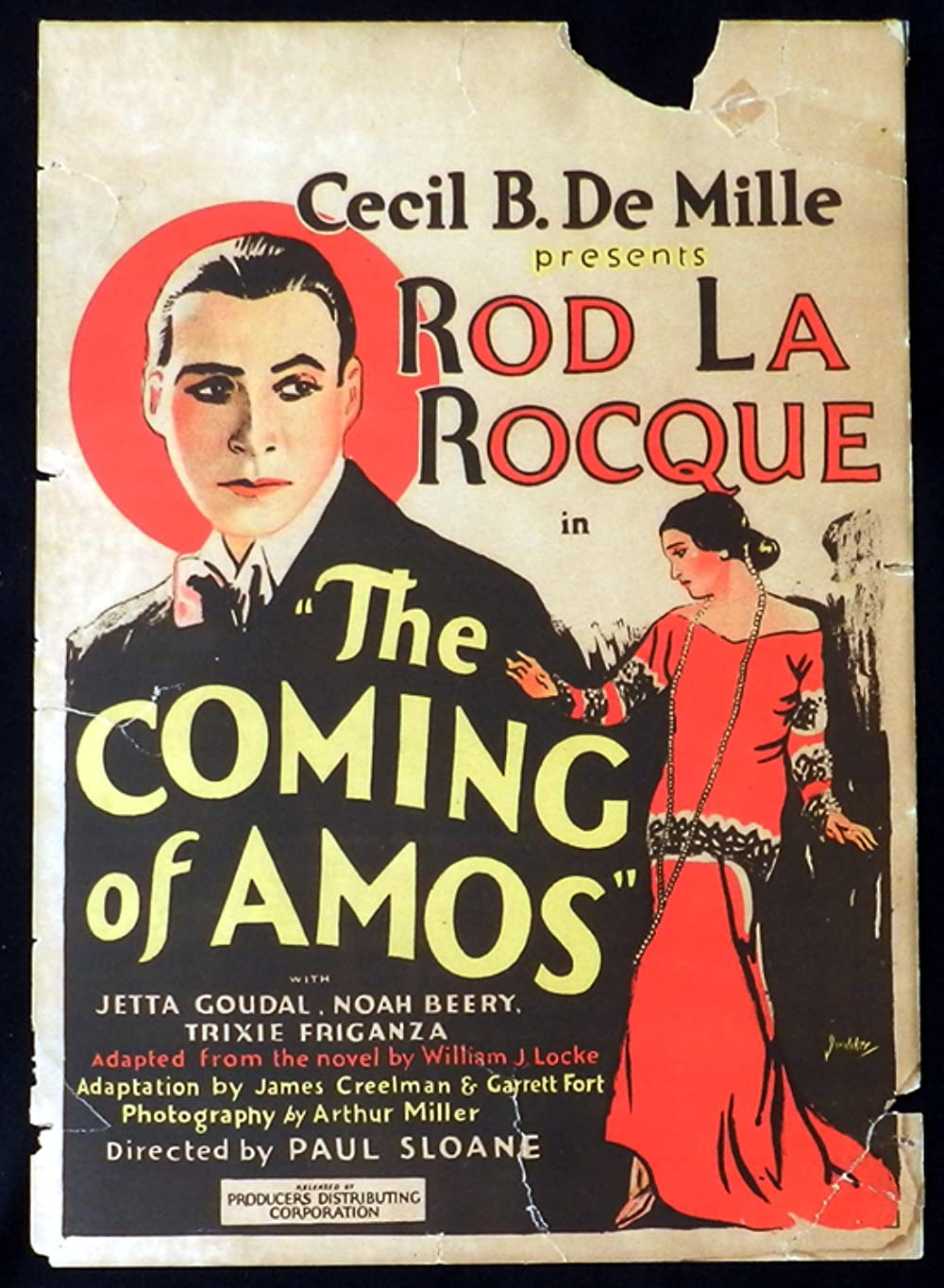
- Theatrical poster
- Directed by: Paul Sloane
- Written by: Garrett Fort (adaptation); James Ashmore Creelman (adaptation)
- Based on: The Coming of Amos by William J. Locke
- Produced by: Cecil B. DeMille
- Starring: Rod La Rocque; Jetta Goudal; Noah Beery
- Cinematography: Arthur C. Miller
- Distributed by: Producers Distributing Corporation
- Release date: September 6, 1925
- Running time: 60 minutes (6 reels; 5,677 feet)
- Country: United States
- Language: Silent (English intertitles)

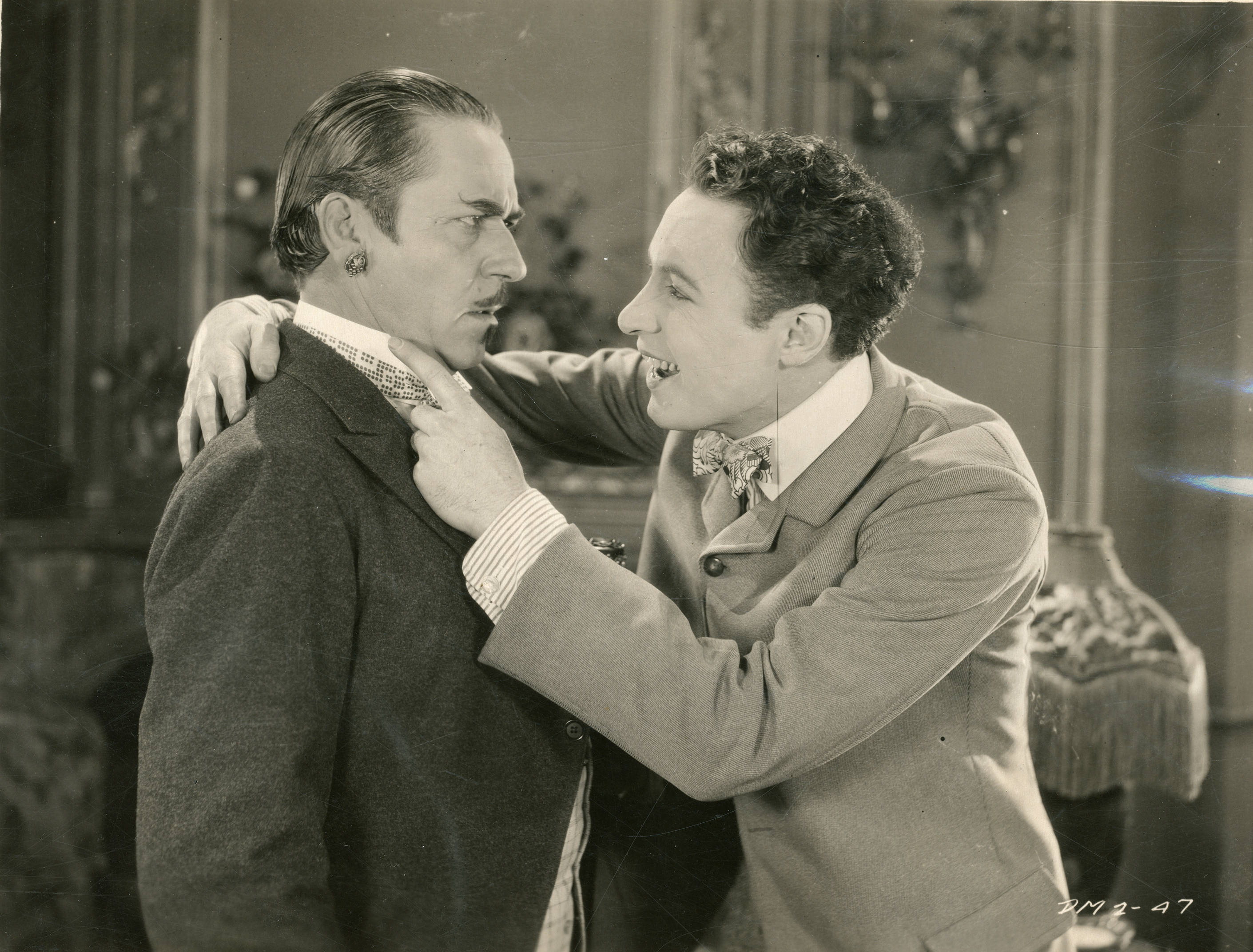
Noah Beery Sr. and Rod La Rocque in The Coming of Amos

The Coming of Amos is a 1925 American silent romantic drama film directed by Paul Sloane, produced by Cecil B. DeMille and distributed by his Producers Distributing Corporation. Copies of this film survive and can be found on home video and more recently on DVD.

== Plot ==
As described in a film magazine review, Amos Burden's mother dies and leaves him 50,000 pounds and the richest sheep farm in Australia. He leaves his home for that of his uncle, David Fontenay, who lives on the continent. The uncle, fastidious, tidy, and high in social circles, is distressed by the ingenuous and uncouth Amos. Fontenay's friends, with the exception of the Princess Nadia, are amused by Amos. The Princess favors him, however, and Amos woos her, ignorant of the tales of the disaster that befell each of her former suitors. Under the tutelage of the aesthete Bendyke Hamilton, Amos becomes a gentleman so far as externals go and he progresses well with the Princess. Then out of the past appears Ramon Garcia with a threat of suffering for the Princess if she does not redeem a promise made to him. The Princess, fearful of Garcia, puts off his promise until the night of the Rose Carnival. Garcia swears to take her by force on this night if she fails him. To escape Garcia's wrath, the Princess pretends a loss of interest for Amos. Then follow hectic days for the two men and the woman involving duels and hairbreadth escapes from death. In the end Garcia is killed and Amos and his Princess bride are united.

== Cast ==
- Rod La Rocque as Amos Burden
- Jetta Goudal as Princess Nadia Ramiroff
- Noah Beery as Ramon Garcia
- Richard Carle as David Fontenay
- Arthur Hoyt as Bendyke Hamilton
- Trixie Friganza as Dowager Duchess of Parth
- Clarence Burton as Pedro Valdez
- Ruby Lafayette as Nurse
- Louis Natheaux as Duchess' Gigolo (uncredited)
- August Tollaire as Doctor (uncredited)

== Preservation ==
Prints of The Coming of Amos are preserved in the Library of Congress collection, Archives Du Film Du CNC Bois d'Arcy, George Eastman Museum Motion Picture Collection, and Cinémathèque française.
