= Noah Beery =

American actor (1882–1946)

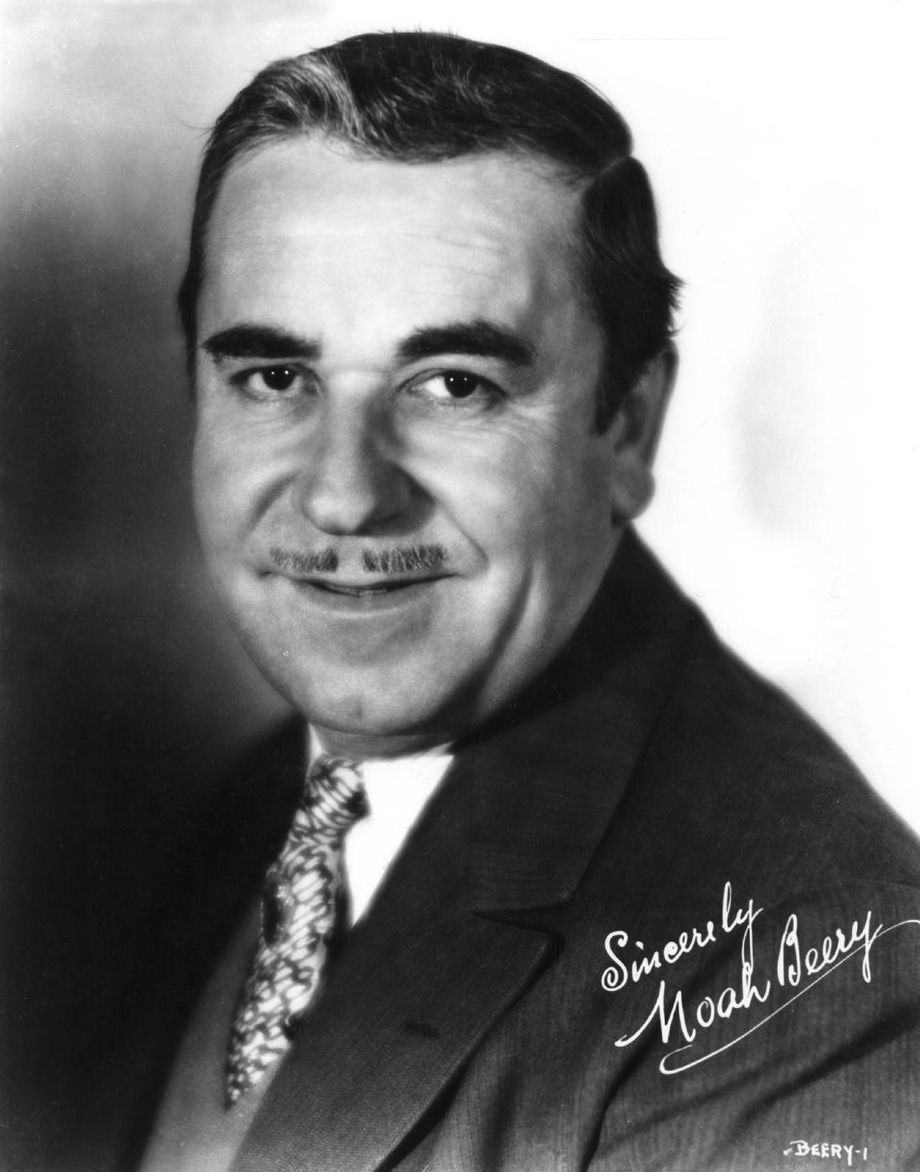
- Beery in 1930
- Born: Noah Nicholas Beery; January 17, 1882; Clay County, Missouri, U.S.
- Died: April 1, 1946 (aged 64); Beverly Hills, California, U.S.
- Resting place: Forest Lawn Memorial Park, Hollywood Hills, California
- Occupation: Actor
- Years active: 1898–1946
- Spouse: Marguerite Lindsay (m. 1910)
- Children: Noah Beery Jr.
- Relatives: Wallace Beery (brother)

Noah Nicholas Beery (January 17, 1882 – April 1, 1946) was an American actor who appeared in films from 1913 until his death in 1946. He was the older brother of Academy Award-winning actor Wallace Beery as well as the father of character actor Noah Beery Jr. He was billed as either Noah Beery or Noah Beery Sr. depending upon the film.

== Early life ==
Noah Nicholas Beery was born on a farm in Clay County, Missouri, not far from Smithville. The Beery family left the farm in the 1890s and moved to nearby Kansas City, Missouri, where the father was employed as a police officer. While still a young boy Beery got his first exposure to theatre, and at the same time showed budding entrepreneurship by selling lemon drops at the Gillis Theater in Kansas City.

Beery's deep, rich voice in his early teens led several actors at the Gillis Theater to encourage him to take singing lessons and consider a career as a performer. A summer of singing at Kansas City's Electric Park amusement park led to his leaving for New York City at age 16. Beery was three years older than his brother Wallace, who also became an actor as quickly as he could.

== Career ==
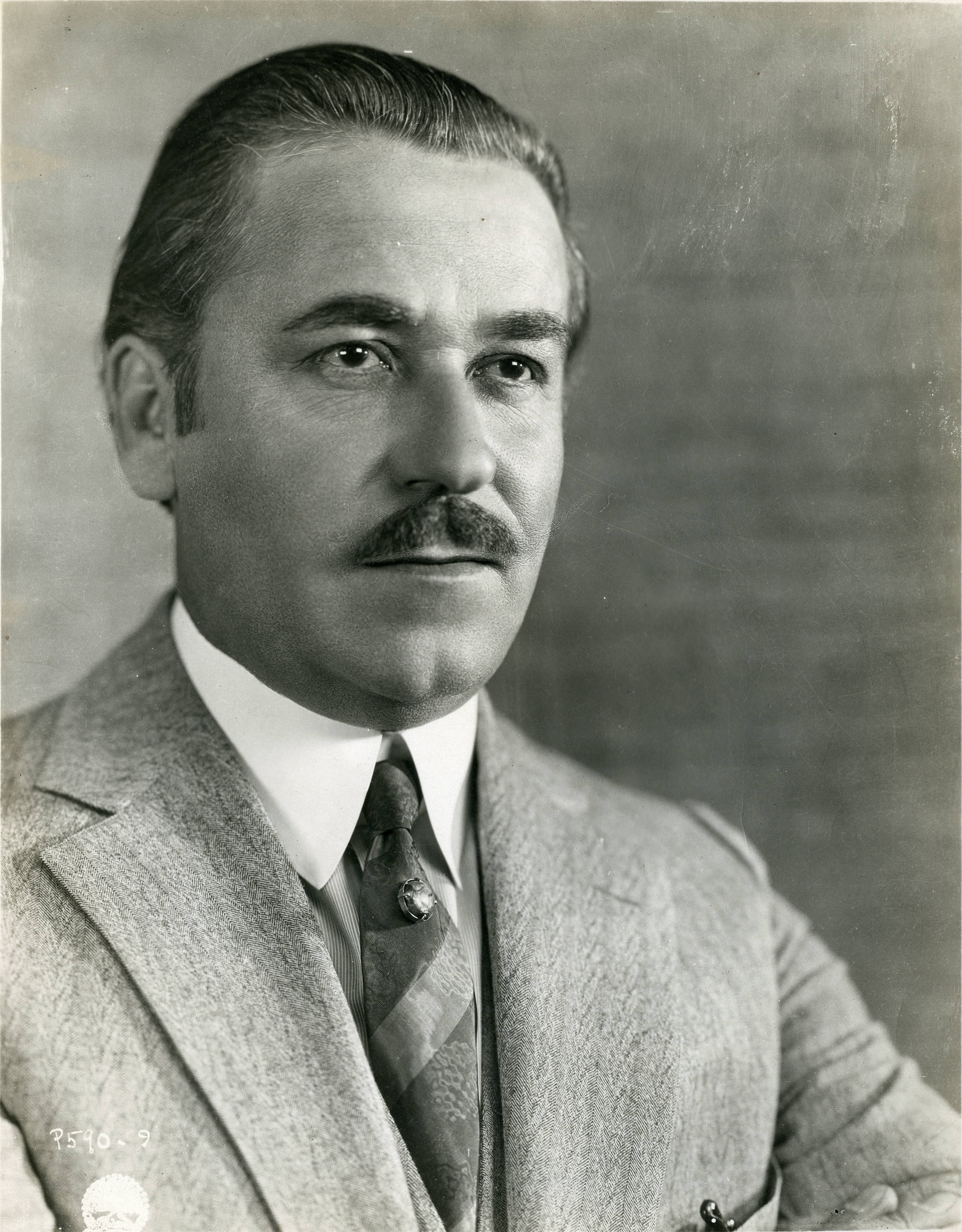
Beery in 1925

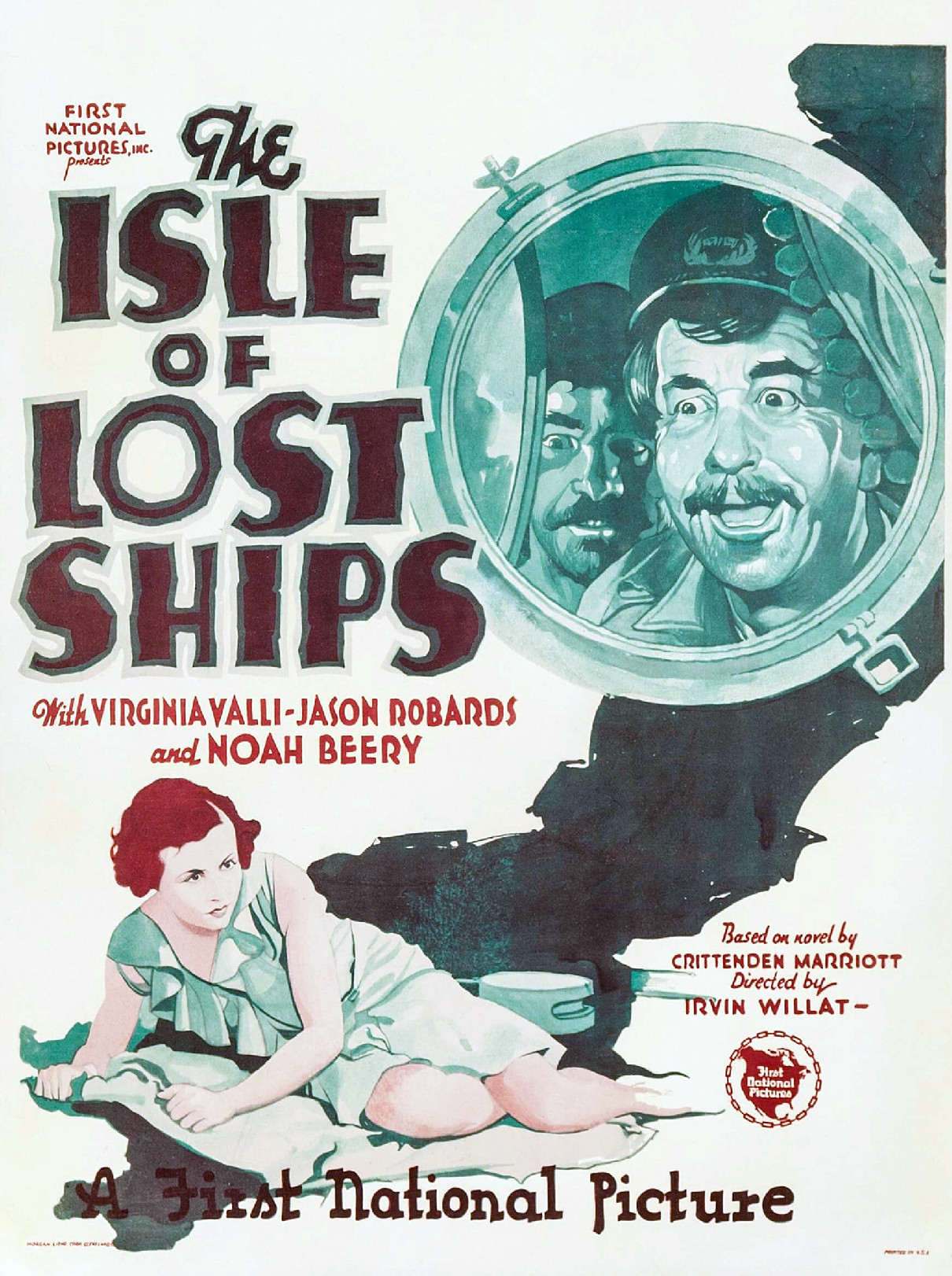
Isle of Lost Ships (1929) with Jason Robards Sr. and Beery

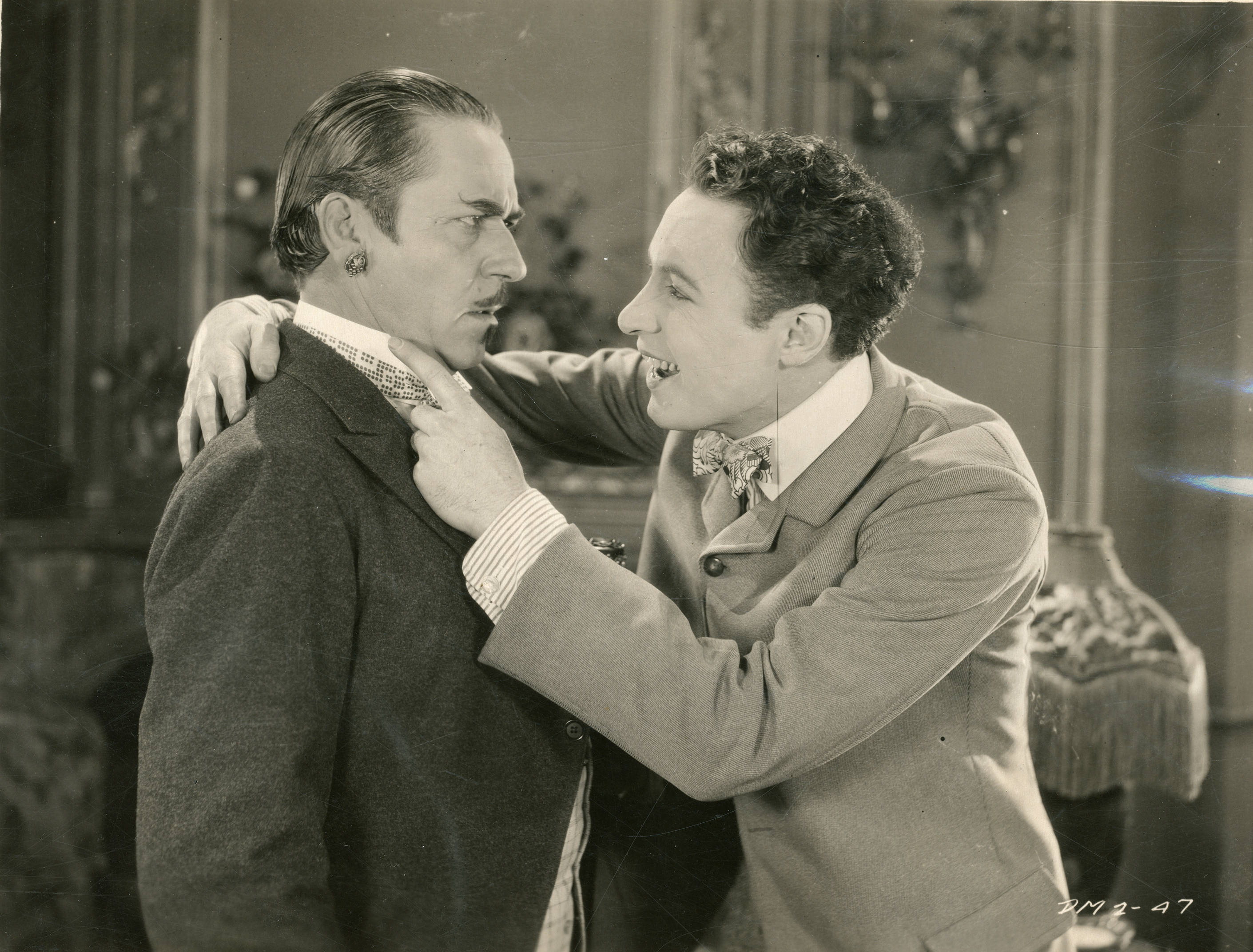
The Coming of Amos (1925)

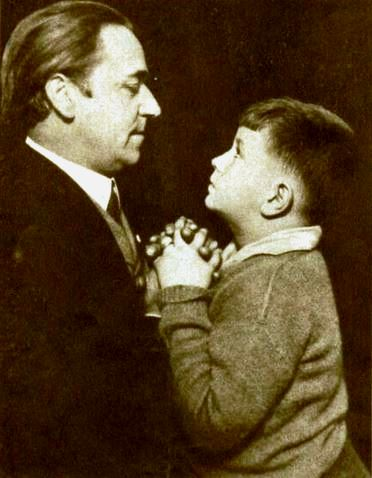
Beery and his son Noah Beery Jr. in 1922

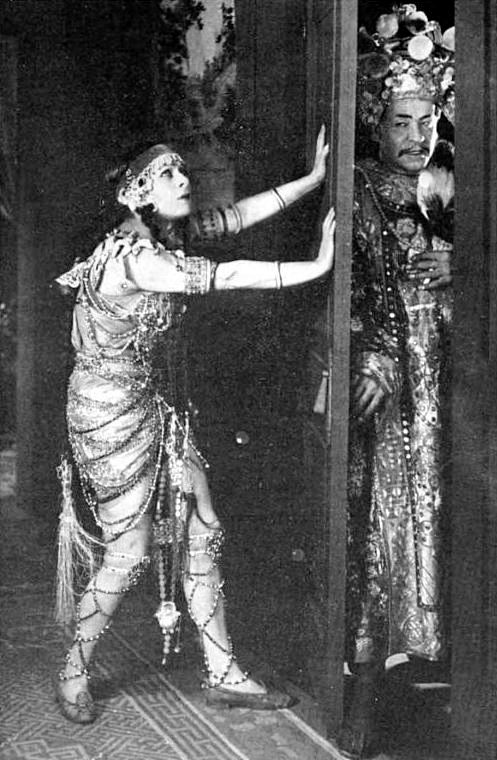
The Red Lantern (1919) with Alla Nazimova and Beery

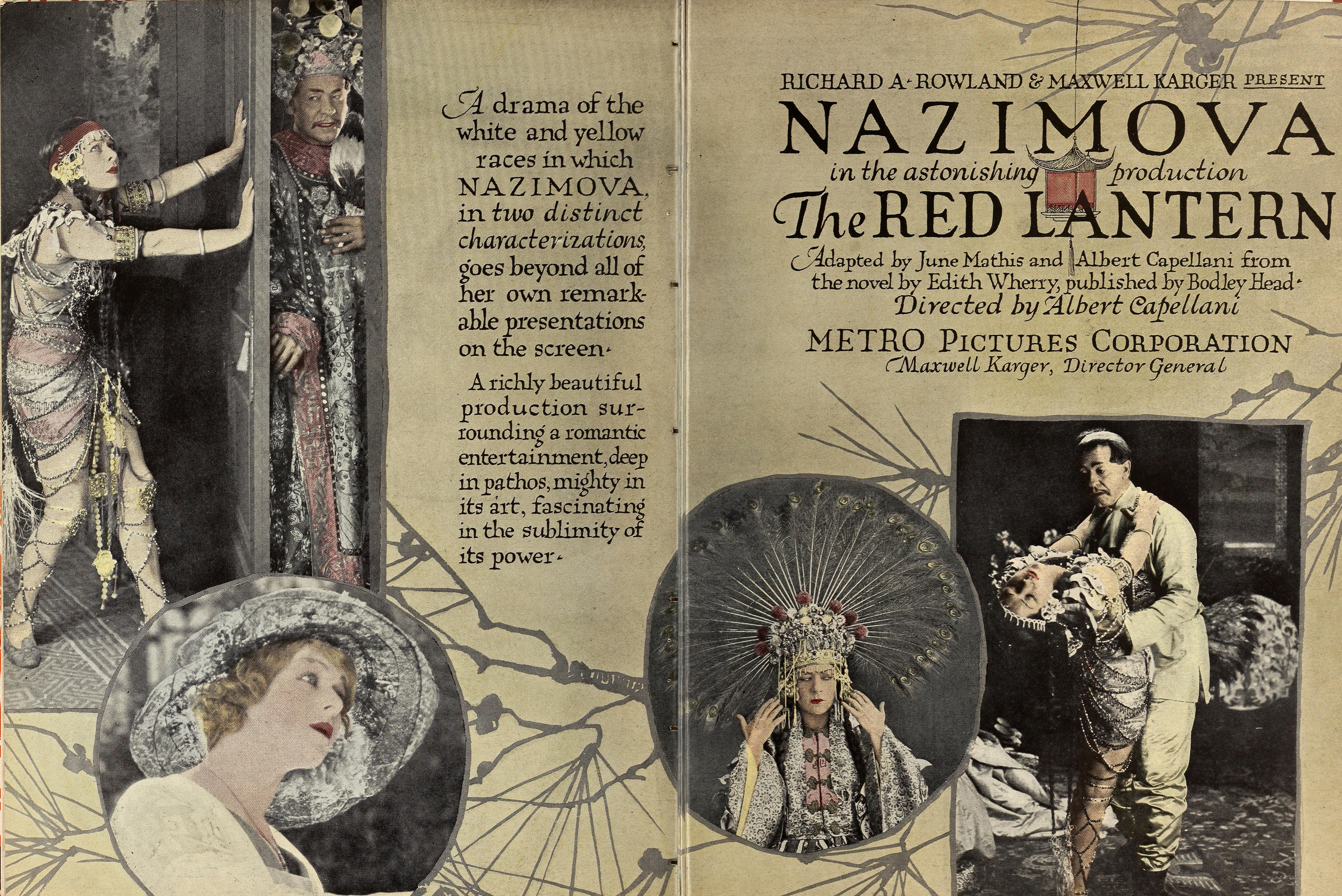
The Red Lantern (1919) with Nazimova and Beery

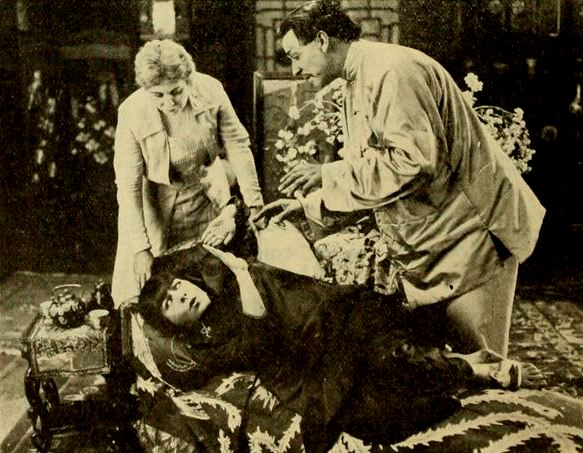
The Red Lantern (1919) with Nazimova and Beery

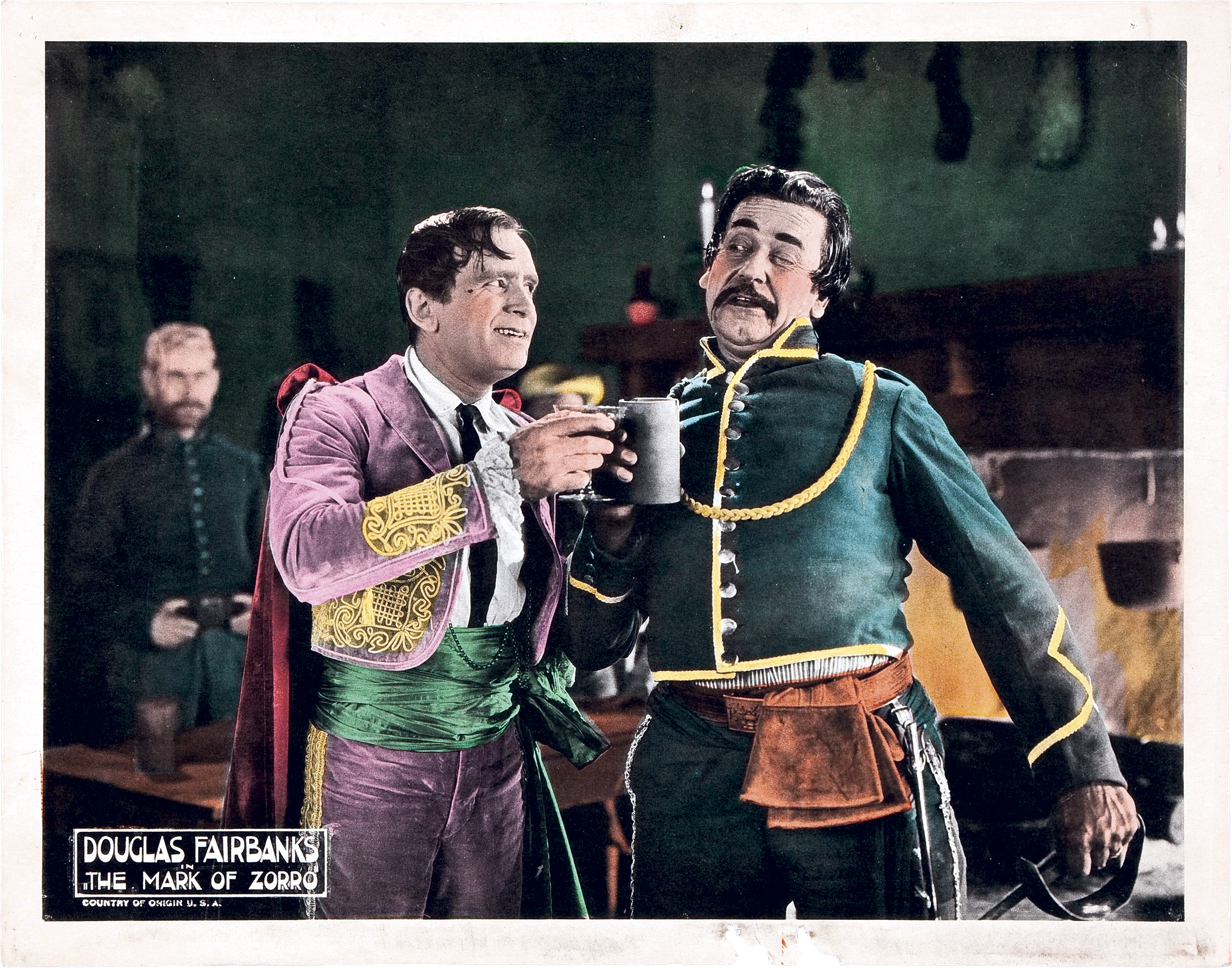
The Mark of Zorro (1920) with Douglas Fairbanks and Beery

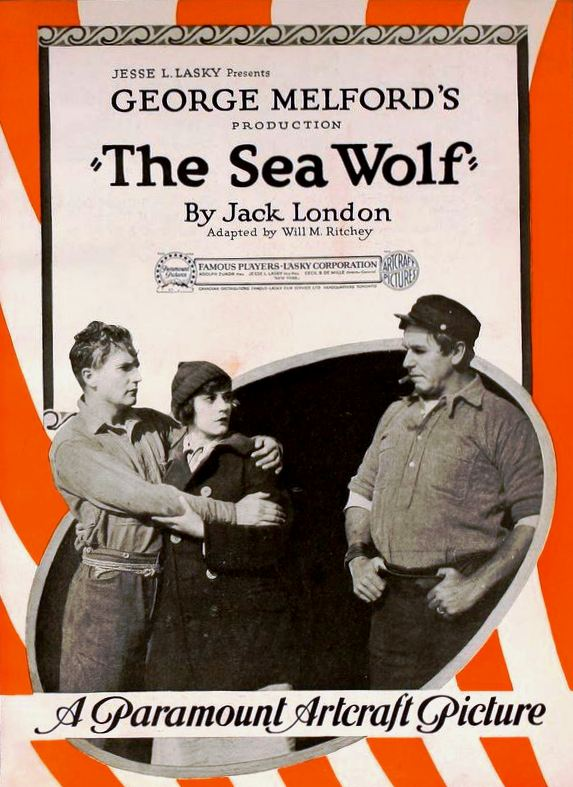
The Sea Wolf (1920) with Beery as Wolf Larsen

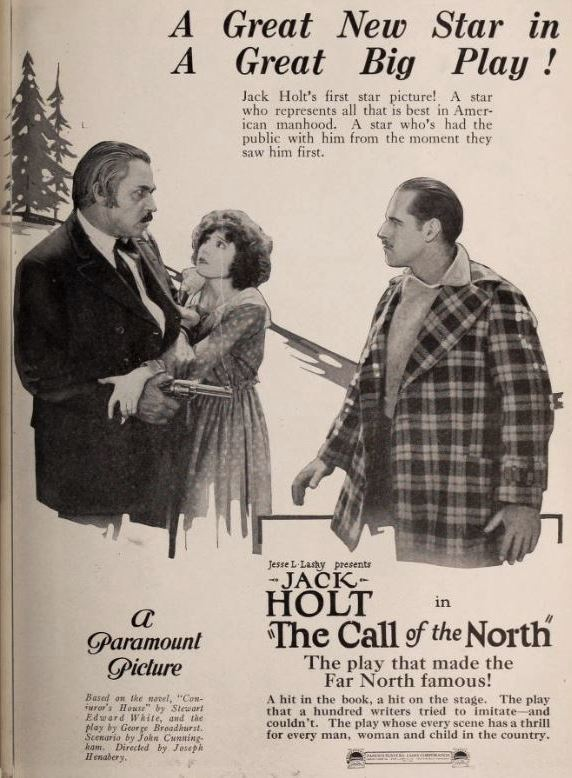
The Call of the North (1921)

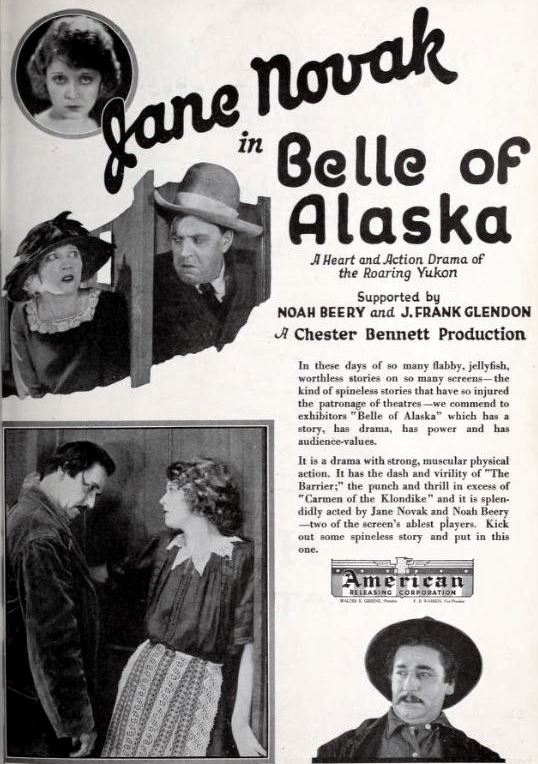
Belle of Alaska (1922)

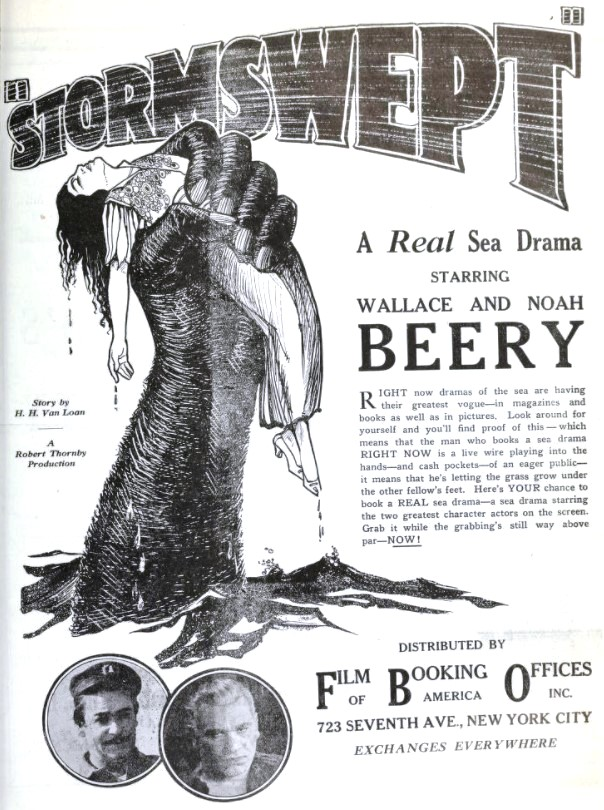
Stormswept (1923) with Wallace and Noah Beery

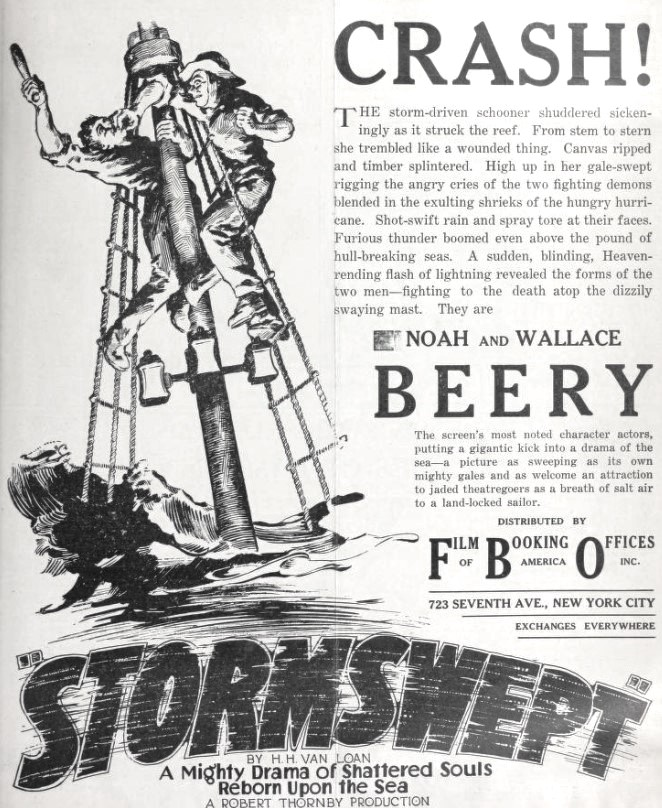
Stormswept (1923) with Noah and Wallace Beery

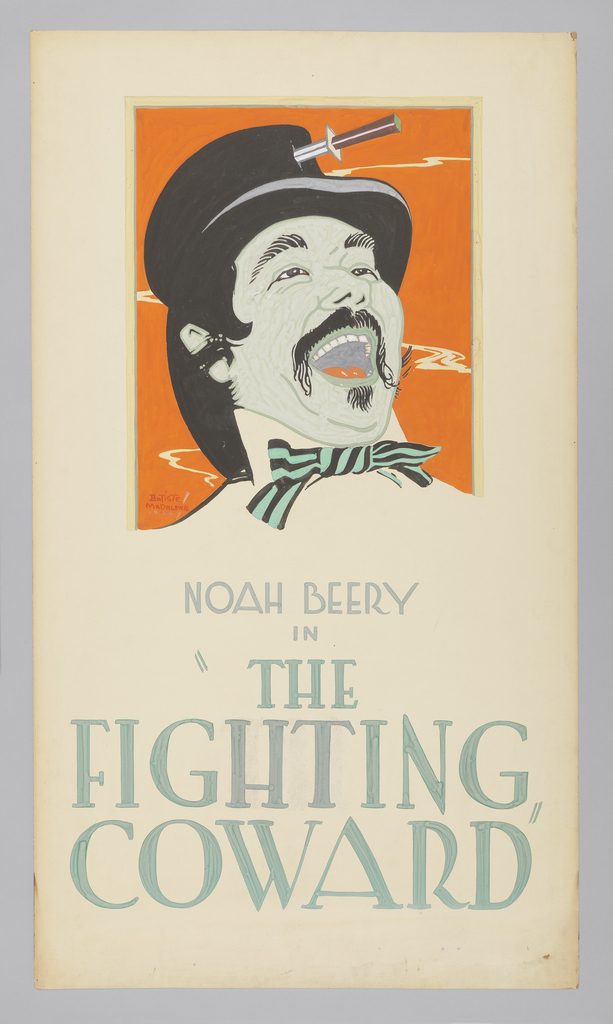
The Fighting Coward (1924)

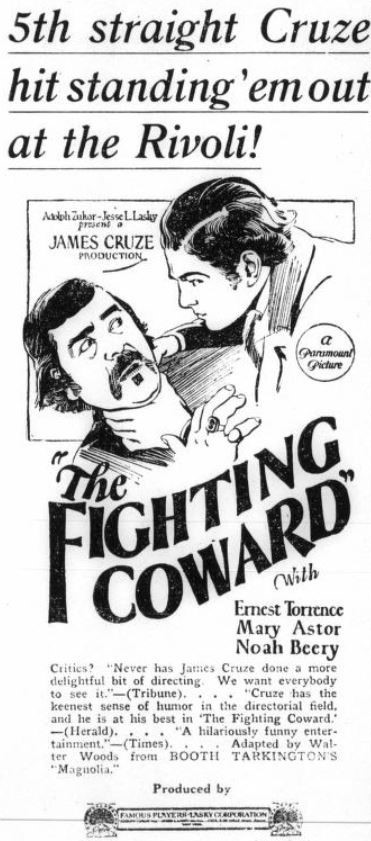
The Fighting Coward (1924) with Beery and Cullen Landis

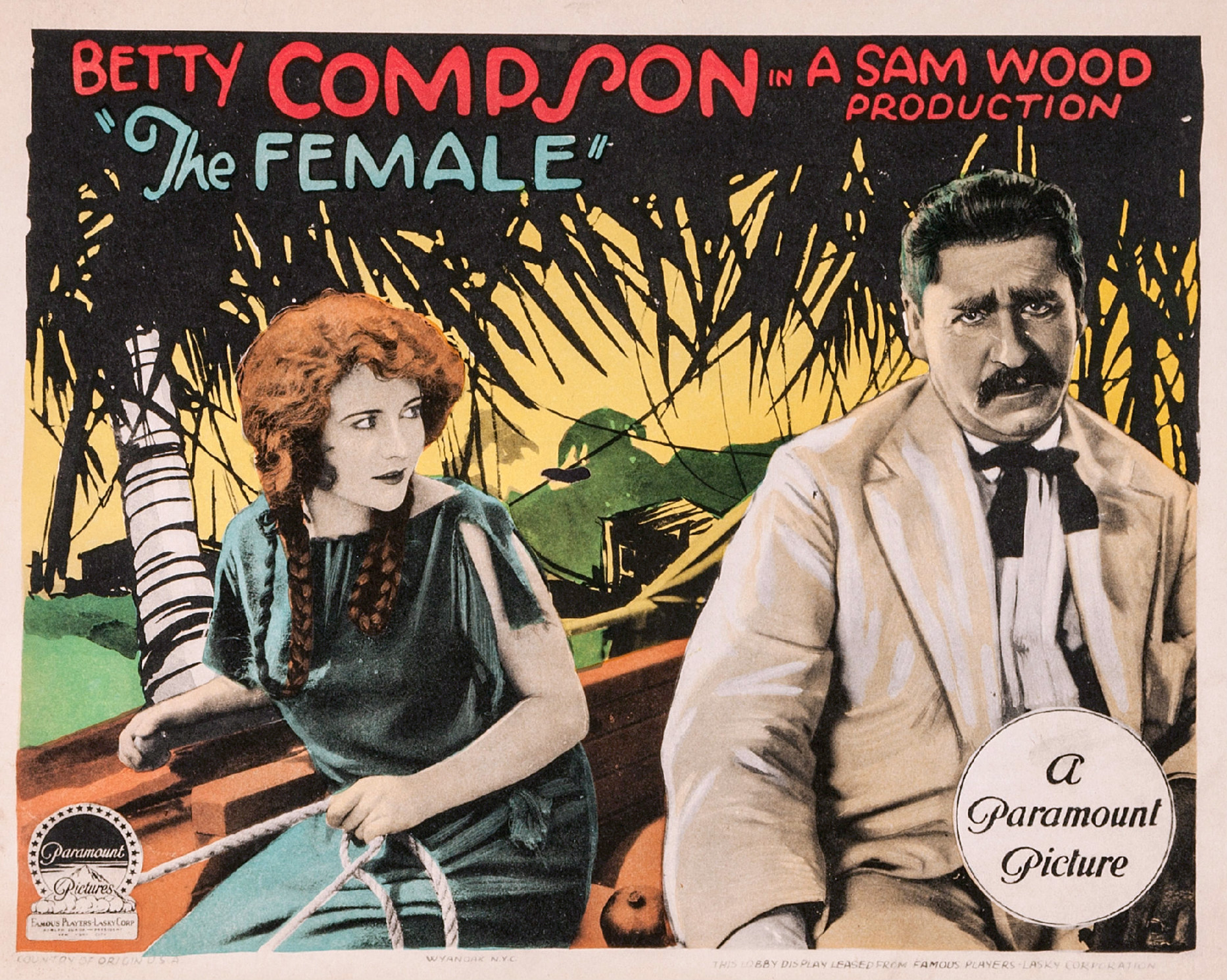
Betty Compson and Beery in The Female (1924)

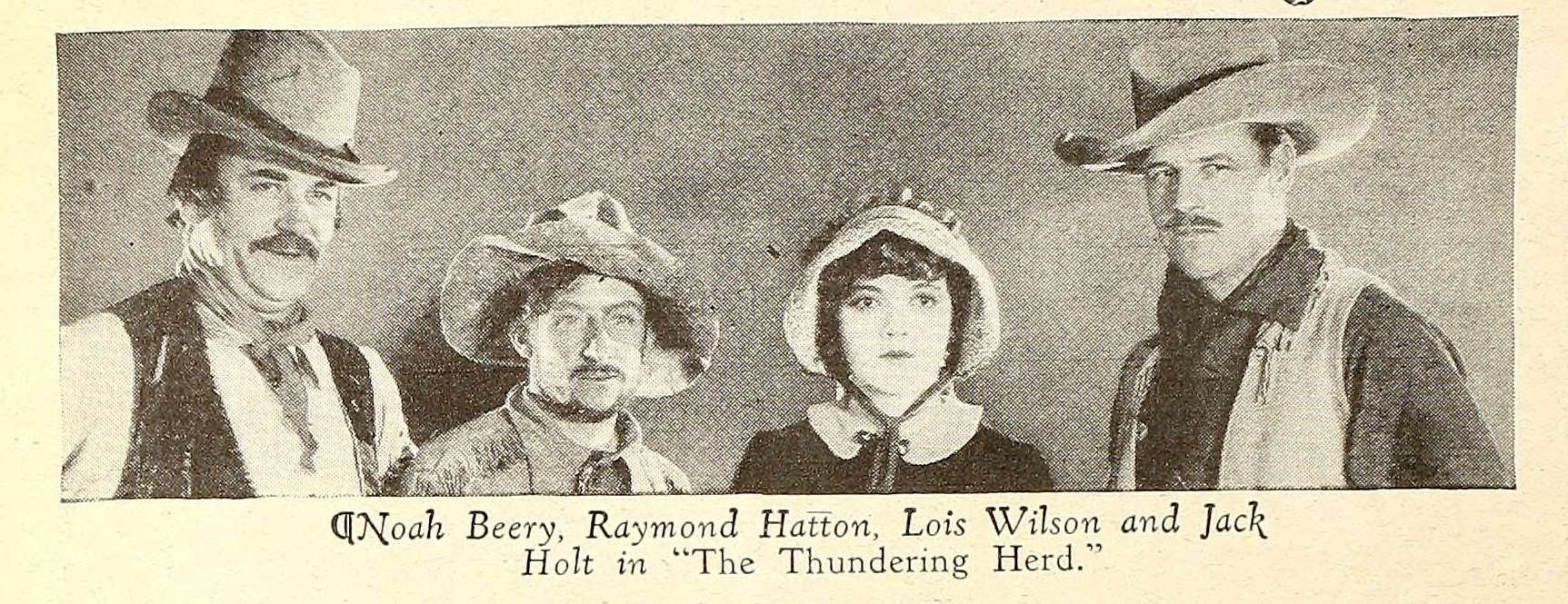
Beery, Raymond Hatton, Lois Wilson, and Jack Holt in The Thundering Herd (1925)

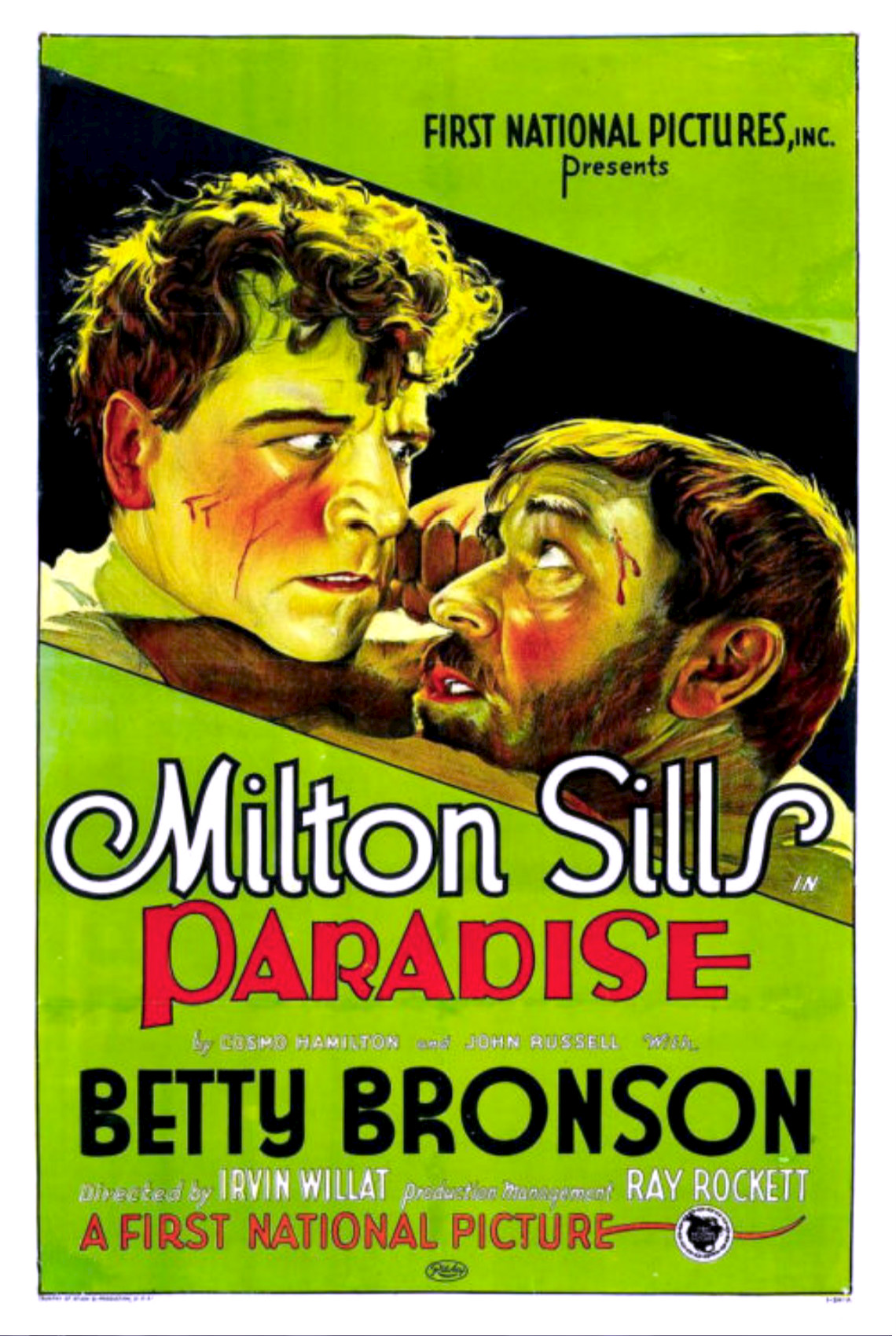
Paradise (1926)

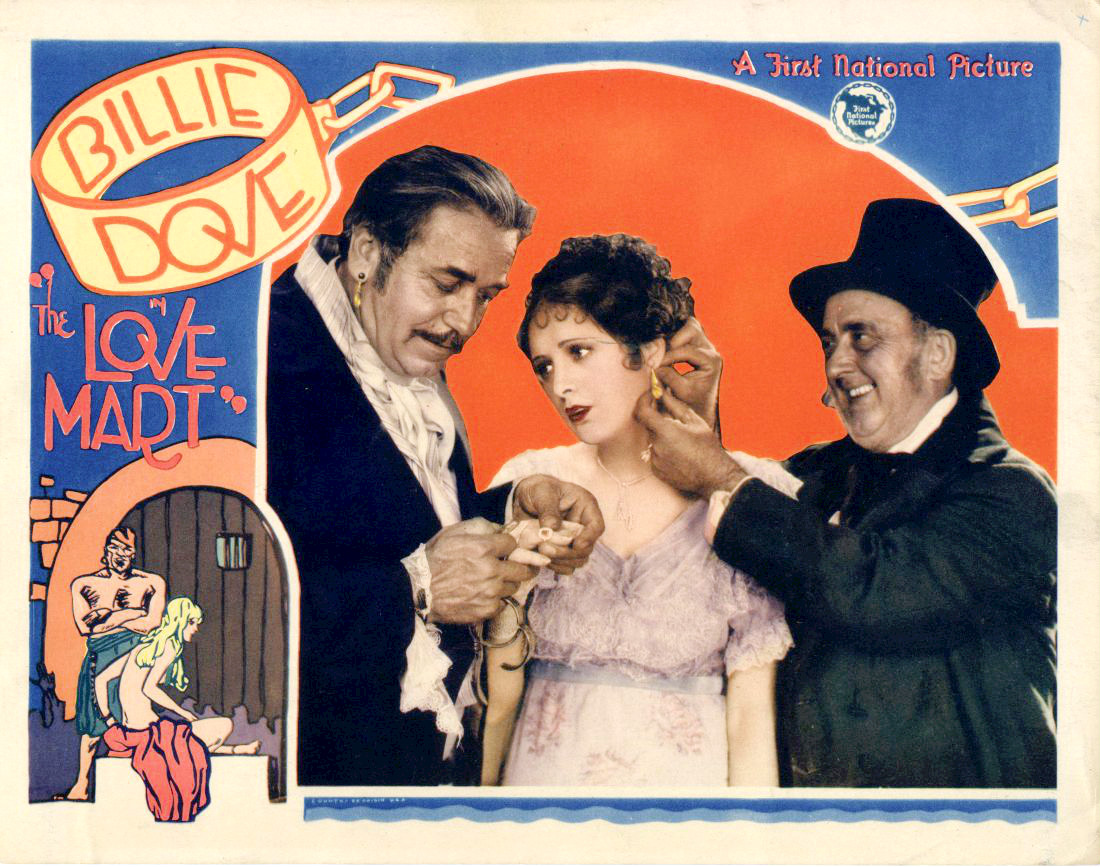
The Love Mart (1927)

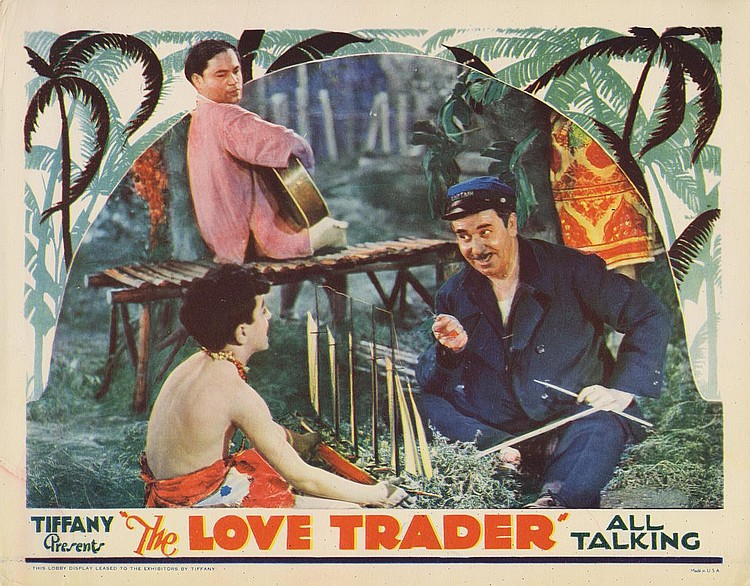
The Love Trader (1930)

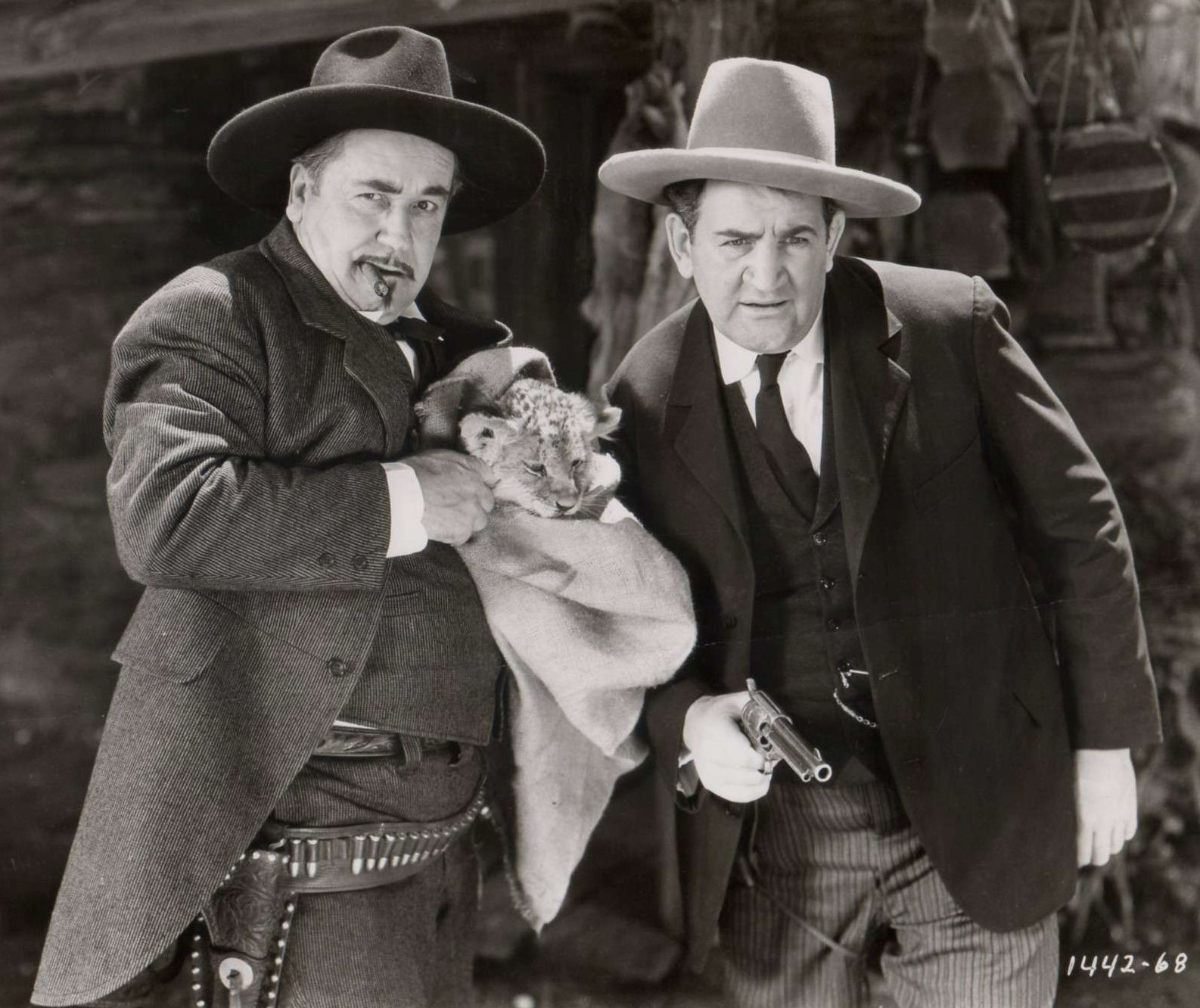
Beery and Tom Kennedy in Man of the Forest (1933)

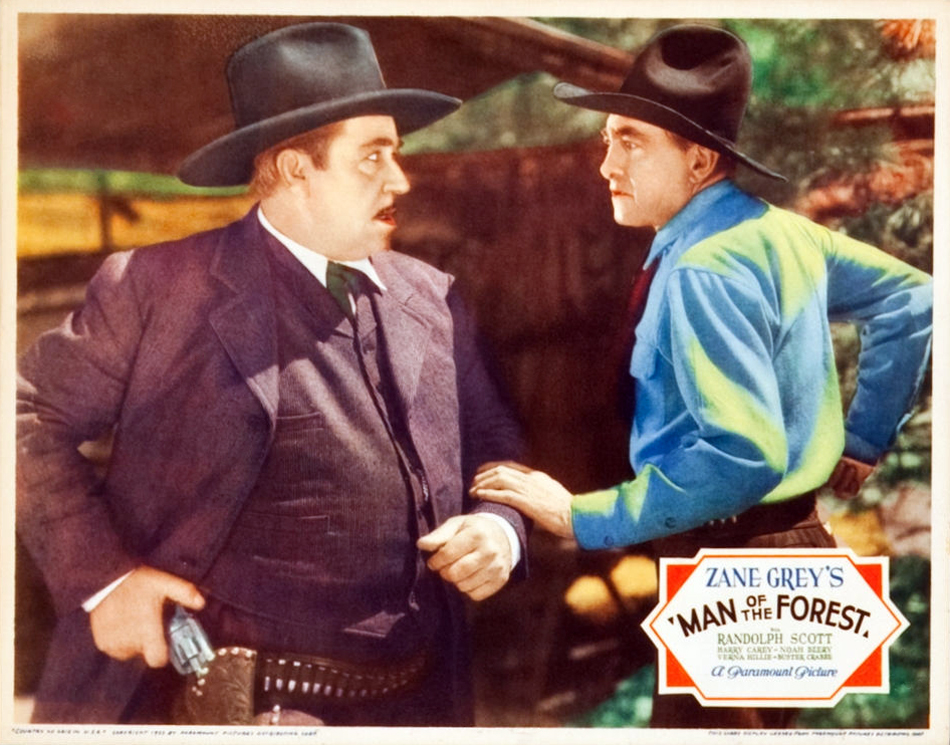
Beery and Harry Carey in Man of the Forest

Beery worked in vaudeville and in the choruses of musical comedies during his early years in New York. Soon, though, he turned to acting in melodramas of the period, often under the direction of William A. Brady.

After a dozen years on the stage, he joined his brother Wallace in Hollywood in 1915 to make motion pictures. He became a respected character actor, adept at playing the villain but sometimes portraying the hero. One of his most memorable characterizations was as Sergeant Gonzales in The Mark of Zorro (1920) opposite Douglas Fairbanks. The tagline on the poster for Stormswept (1923) proclaimed "Wallace and Noah Beery, the Two Greatest Character Actors on the American Screen".

Beery acted through the silent film era, and made the transition to sound films. He appeared in early Technicolor musicals, such as The Show of Shows (1929), the widescreen musical Song of the Flame (1930; the movie's poster noted that "Noah Beery will thrill you with his wonderful bass voice, twice as low as any ever recorded"), Bright Lights (1930), Under a Texas Moon (1930) and Golden Dawn (1930; in which he wore blackface as an African native).

He reached his peak in popularity in 1930, recording a phonograph record for Brunswick Records with songs from two of his films. However, his popularity gradually declined while his brother Wallace became the highest-paid actor in the world, winning an Oscar and arranging a contract with MGM in which he would be paid $1 more than any other actor on their roster. Noah Beery Sr. played the flamboyant supporting role of Mae West's bar-owning lover until she leaves him for Cary Grant in She Done Him Wrong (1933), and his brother Wallace performed in an extremely similar part, as the top-billed lead, later the same year in Raoul Walsh's The Bowery.

At the height of his career, Noah Beery began billing himself as Noah Beery Sr. in anticipation of his son's presence in films. After his death, his son dropped the Junior and became simply Noah Beery. Among other films, Noah Beery Sr. and Noah Beery Jr. appeared together in The Trail Beyond (1934) with John Wayne, in which Noah Jr. played Wayne's sidekick throughout the picture. Four decades later, Noah Jr. became best known as James Garner's character's father "Rocky" in the 1970s television series The Rockford Files. Noah Beery Sr. appeared in nearly 200 films during his career and in 1945 returned to New York City to star in the Mike Todd Broadway production of Up in Central Park.

== Personal life ==
Beery married actress Marguerite Walker Lindsey in 1910. Their first child died in infancy. Their second child, actor Noah Lindsey Beery (stage name Noah Beery Jr.), was born in 1913 and was seriously ill in early childhood, prompting a brief move to Florida on the advice of doctors.

== Death ==
Beery died on April 1, 1946, aged 64, after suffering a heart attack at the home of his brother Wallace Beery in Beverly Hills. It was Wallace's birthday, and in addition to celebrating the event, the brothers were rehearsing a radio drama they were scheduled to perform later in the evening.

He was buried at Forest Lawn Memorial Park, Hollywood Hills in Los Angeles.

== Selected filmography ==
- The Influence of a Child (1913, Short) as Jim Cooper - a Crook
- The Social Highwayman (1916) as Hugh Jaffray
- The Human Orchid (1916)
- The Spirit of '76 (1917) as George Washington
- A Mormon Maid (1917) as Darius Burr
- Sacrifice (1917) as Count Wenzel
- The Chosen Prince, or The Friendship of David and Jonathan (1917) as Saul
- The Hostage (1917) as Boyadi
- The Clever Mrs. Carfax (1917) as Adrian Graw
- Molly Entangled (1917) as Shawn, the Smithy
- His Robe of Honor (1918) as 'Boss' Nordhoff
- The Hidden Pearls (1918) as Teariki
- The Whispering Chorus (1918) as Longshoreman
- The White Man's Law (1918) as Dr. Robinson
- Old Wives for New (1918) as Doctor (uncredited)
- Social Ambition (1918) as Big Dan Johnson
- Believe Me, Xantippe (1918) as Sheriff Kamman
- Less Than Kin (1918) as Senor Cortez
- The Source (1918) as John Nord
- The Goat (1918) as Cowboy (uncredited)
- Too Many Millions (1918) as R.A. Bass
- The Squaw Man (1918) as Tabywana
- Under the Top (1919) as Prof. De Como
- Johnny Get Your Gun (1919) as Town Marshal
- The Red Lantern (1919) as Dr. Sam Wang
- The Woman Next Door (1919) as Randolph Schuyler
- A Very Good Young Man (1919) as Blood
- Louisiana (1919) as Lem Rogers
- The Valley of the Giants (1919) as Black Minorca
- In Mizzoura (1919) as Jo Vernon
- Everywoman (1919) as Bluff
- The Sagebrusher (1920) as Sim Gage
- The Fighting Shepherdess (1920) as Mormon Joe
- The Sea Wolf (1920) as 'Wolf' Larsen, the Sea Wolf
- Go and Get It (1920) as Dr. Ord
- Love Madness (1920) as Jack Frost
- The Scoffer (1920) as Boorman
- The Mutiny of the Elsinore (1920) as Andreas Mellzire
- Dinty (1920) as Wong Tai
- The Mark of Zorro (1920) as Sergeant Pedro Gonzales
- Why Tell? (1921)
- Bob Hampton of Placer (1921) as Red Slavin
- Beach of Dreams (1921) as Jack Raft
- Bits of Life (1921) as Hindoo
- The Call of the North (1921) as Galen Albret
- Lotus Blossom (1921) as Tartar Chief
- Tillie (1922) as Jacob Getz
- Wild Honey (1922) as Henry Porthen
- Belle of Alaska (1922) as Wade Harkin
- The Lying Truth (1922) as Lawrence De Muidde
- The Heart Specialist (1922) as Dr. Thomas Fitch
- The Crossroads of New York (1922) as James Flint
- I Am the Law (1922) (with Wallace Beery) as Sgt. Georges Mordeaux
- Flesh and Blood (1922) as Li Fang (with Lon Chaney)
- The Power of Love (1922) as Don Almeda
- Youth to Youth (1922) as Brutus Tawney
- Good Men and True (1922) as S.S. Thorpe
- Ebb Tide (1922) as Richard Attwater
- Omar the Tentmaker (1922) (with Boris Karloff) as The shah of shahs
- Dangerous Trails (1923) as Insp. Criswell
- The Spider and the Rose (1923) as Maître Renaud
- Stormswept (1923) (with Wallace Beery) as Shark Moran
- Quicksands (1923) as 'Silent' Krupz
- Main Street (1923) as Adolph Valborg
- Soul of the Beast (1923) as Caesar Durand
- Wandering Daughters (1923) as Charle Horton
- The Spoilers (1923) (with Milton Sills and Anna Q. Nilsson) as Alex McNamara
- Tipped Off (1923) as Chang Wo
- Hollywood (1923, Cameo) as himself
- The Destroying Angel (1923) as Curtis Drummond
- To the Last Man (1923) as Colter
- His Last Race (1923) as Packy Sloane
- When Law Comes to Hades (1923)
- Desire (1923) as Hop Lee
- Stephen Steps Out (1923) as Muley Pasha
- The Call of the Canyon (1923) as Haze Ruff
- The Heritage of the Desert (1924) as Holderness
- The Fighting Coward (1924) as Capt. Blackie
- Wanderer of the Wasteland (1924) as Dismukes
- Welcome Stranger (1924) as Icabod Whitson
- Lily of the Dust (1924) (with Pola Negri and Ben Lyon) as Col. Mertzbach
- The Female (1924) (with Betty Compson and Warner Baxter) as Barend de Beer
- North of 36 (1924) (with Jack Holt and Lois Wilson) as Slim Rudabaugh
- The Spaniard (1925) as Gómez
- East of Suez (1925) as British Consul
- Folly of Youth (1925) as Lee Haynes
- Contraband (1925) (with Lois Wilson) as Deputy Jenney
- The Thundering Herd (1925) (with Jack Holt, Charles Ogle and Tim McCoy) as Randall Jett
- Old Shoes (1925) as The Stepfather
- The Light of Western Stars (1925) as Brand
- Wild Horse Mesa (1925) as Bud McPherson
- The Coming of Amos (1925) as Ramón Garcia
- The Vanishing American (1925) (with Richard Dix) as Booker
- Lord Jim (1925) (with Raymond Hatton) as Captain Brown
- The Enchanted Hill (1926) as Jake Dort
- The Crown of Lies (1926) as Count Mirko
- Padlocked (1926) as Henry Gilbert
- Beau Geste (1926) (with Ronald Colman, William Powell, and Victor McLaglen) as Sgt. Lejaune
- Paradise (1926) as Quex
- Evening Clothes (1927) as Lazarre
- The Rough Riders (1927) (with George Bancroft and Mary Astor) as Hell's Bells
- The Love Mart (1927) (with Boris Karloff) as Capt. Remy
- The Dove (1927) as Don José María y Sandoval
- Beau Sabreur (1928) as Sheikh El Hammel
- Two Lovers (1928) as The Duke of Azar
- Hellship Bronson (1928) as Capt. Ira Bronson
- The Godless Girl (1928) as The Brute
- The Passion Song (1928) as John Van Ryn
- Noah's Ark (1928) as Nickoloff / King Nephiliu
- Dreary House (1928)
- Love in the Desert (1929) as Abdullah
- Linda (1929) as Armstrong Decker
- False Fathers (1929) as Parson
- Careers (1929) as The President
- The Four Feathers (1929) as Slave Trader
- The Isle of Lost Ships (1929) as Captain Peter Forbes
- Two O'Clock in the Morning (1929)
- The Show of Shows (1929) (with John Barrymore, Mary Astor, Myrna Loy and Loretta Young) as Performer in "The Pirate" Number / Soldier (segment "Rifle Execution")
- Glorifying the American Girl (1929) as himself (uncredited)
- Isle of Escape (1930) as Shane
- Under a Texas Moon (1930) as Jed Parker
- Murder Will Out (1930) as Lt. Concon
- Showgirl in Hollywood (1930) as himself at Premiere (uncredited)
- Song of the Flame (1930) as Konstantin
- Golden Dawn (1930) as Shep Keyes
- Oh Sailor Behave (1930) as Romanian General
- The Way of All Men (1930) as Stratton
- Big Boy (1930) as Bagby
- Bright Lights (1930) as Miguel Parada
- The Love Trader (1930) as Captain Morton
- Renegades (1930) as Thurman Machwurth
- A Soldier's Plaything (1930) as Capt. Plover
- Tol'able David (1930) as Luke
- The Millionaire (1931) as Peterson
- Honeymoon Lane (1931) as Tom Baggott
- The Homicide Squad (1931) as Captain Buckley
- Shanghaied Love (1931) as Captain 'Black Yankee' angus Swope
- Riders of the Purple Sage (1931) (with George O'Brien and Marguerite Churchill) as Judge Dyer
- In Line of Duty (1931) as Jean Duchene
- The Drifter (1932) (with William Farnum) as John McNary
- The Stoker (1932) as Santini
- Stranger in Town (1932) as J.B. Hilliker
- Cornered (1932) as Laughing Red Slavens
- No Living Witness (1932) as Clyde Corbin
- Out of Singapore (1932) as 1st Mate Woolf Barstow
- The Big Stampede (1932) (with John Wayne) as Sam Crew
- The Devil Horse (1932, Serial) as Canfield
- The Kid from Spain (1932) as Alonzo Gomez
- Long Loop Laramie (1932)
- She Done Him Wrong (1933) (with Mae West and Cary Grant) as Gus Jordan
- The Thundering Herd (1933) (with Randolph Scott, Buster Crabbe and Harry Carey) as Randall Jett
- The Flaming Signal (1933) as Otto Von Krantz
- Sunset Pass (1933) (with Randolph Scott and Harry Carey) as Marshal Blake
- The Woman I Stole (1933) as Gen. Rayon
- Easy Millions (1933) with Richard "Skeets" Gallagher
- Fighting with Kit Carson (1933, Serial) as Cyrus Kraft
- Laughing at Life (1933) as Hauseman
- Man of the Forest (1933) (with Randolph Scott, Harry Carey and Buster Crabbe) as Clint Beasley
- To the Last Man (1933) (with Randolph Scott, Esther Ralston and Buster Crabbe) as Jed Colby
- Caravan (1934) as Innkeeper
- Madame Spy (1934) as General Philipow
- David Harum (1934) as General Woolsey
- Mystery Liner (1934) as Capt. John Holling
- Cockeyed Cavaliers (1934) as Baron Moxford
- Happy Landing (1934) as Capt. Terris
- The Trail Beyond (1934) (with John Wayne and Noah Beery Jr.) as George Newson
- Kentucky Kernels (1934) as Colonel Wakefield
- Sweet Adeline (1934) as Sultan in the Show (uncredited)
- King of the Damned (1935) as Mooche
- The Crimson Circle (1936) as Felix Marl
- The Avenging Hand (1936) as Lee Barwell
- Someone at the Door (1936) as Harry Capel
- The Prisoner of Corbal (1936) as The Sergeant
- Strangers on a Honeymoon (1936) as Redbeard
- I Live Again (1936) as Morton Meredith
- The Frog (1937) as Joshua Broad
- Our Fighting Navy (1937) as The Presidente of Bianco
- Zorro Rides Again (1937) as J. A. Marsden
- The Bad Man of Brimstone (1937) (with Wallace Beery) as Ambrose Crocker
- The Girl of the Golden West (1938) as The General
- Panamint's Bad Man (1938) as King Gorman
- Mexicali Rose (1939) as Pedro Valdez
- Mutiny on the Blackhawk (1939) as Captain of the 'Blackhawk'
- Pioneers of the West (1940) as Judge Platt
- Grandpa Goes to Town (1940) as Sam
- Adventures of Red Ryder (1940, Serial) (with Don 'Red' Barry) as Ace Hanlon
- The Tulsa Kid (1940) as Montana Smith
- A Little Bit of Heaven (1940) as Uncle Sherm
- A Missouri Outlaw (1941) as Sheriff Ben Dixon
- The Devil's Trail (1942) as Bull McQuade
- Isle of Missing Men (1942) as Capt. Sanchez (uncredited)
- Overland Mail (1942, Serial with Lon Chaney Jr. and Noah Beery Jr.) as Frank Chadwick
- Outlaws of Pine Ridge (1942) as Honest John Hollister
- Pardon My Gun (1942) as Judge W. B. Hackett (uncredited)
- Tennessee Johnson (1942) (with Van Heflin) as Sheriff Cass
- Carson City Cyclone (1943) as Judge Phalen
- Clancy Street Boys (1943) as Pete Monahan
- Salute to the Marines (1943, in color with Wallace Beery) as Adjutant
- Mr. Muggs Steps Out (1943) as Judge
- Million Dollar Kid (1944) as Captain Mathews
- Block Busters (1944) as Judge
- Barbary Coast Gent (1944 with Wallace Beery and Chill Wills) as Pete Hanibal
- Gentle Annie (1944) as Hansen
- This Man's Navy (1945 with Wallace Beery) as Joe Hodum
- Sing Me a Song of Texas (1945) (with Tom Tyler) as Charley Bronson
