= Welcome Stranger (1924 film) =

1924 film

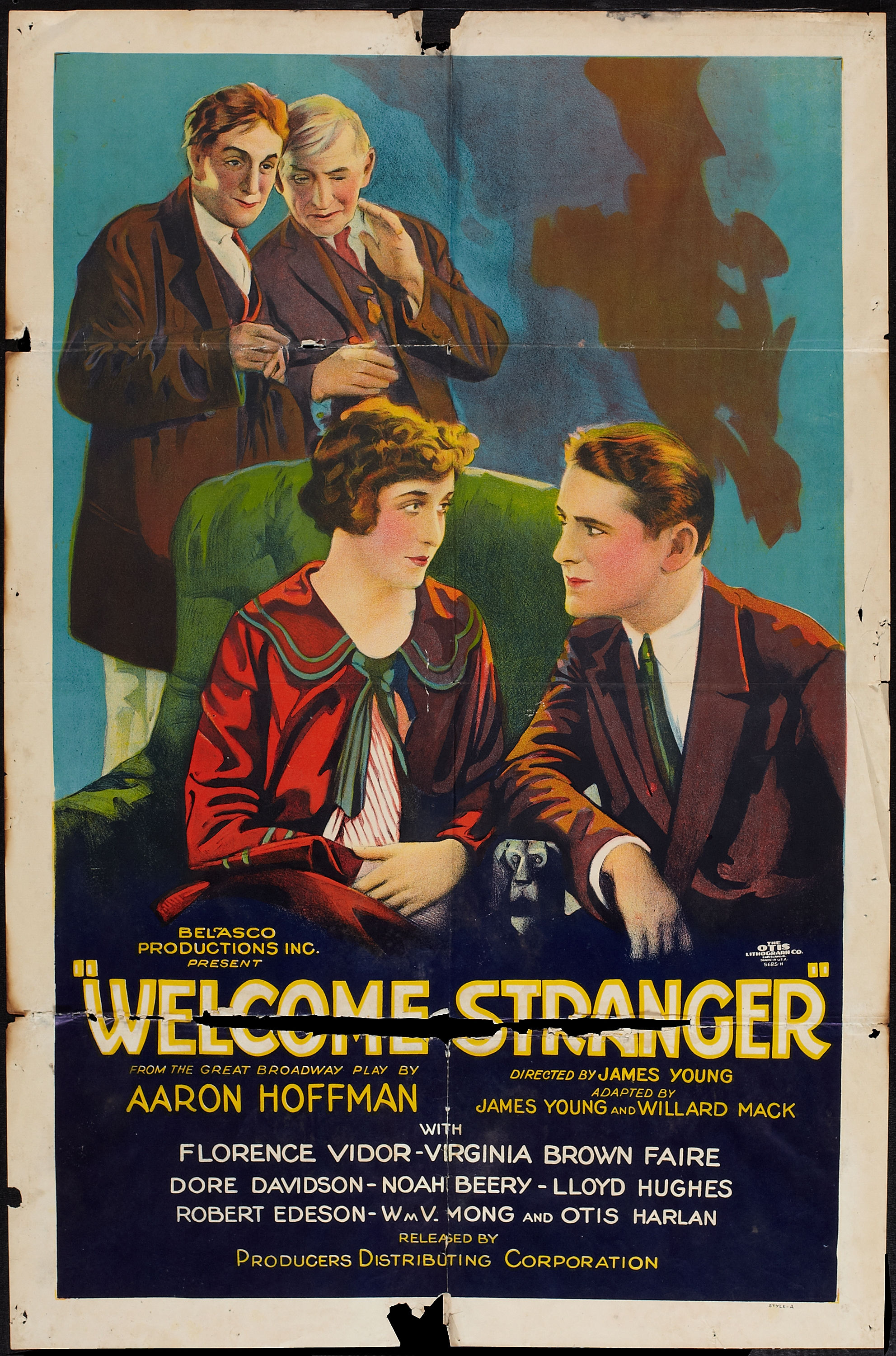
- Film poster
- Directed by: James Young
- Written by: Willard Mack; James Young; Katherine Hilliker; H.H. Caldwell
- Based on: Welcome Stranger by Aaron Hoffman
- Produced by: Belasco Productions
- Starring: Florence Vidor; Noah Beery
- Cinematography: George Benoit
- Distributed by: Producers Distributing Corporation
- Release date: August 24, 1924
- Running time: 70 minutes
- Country: United States
- Language: Silent (English intertitles)

Welcome Stranger is a 1924 American silent comedy-drama film directed by James Young, starring Florence Vidor and featuring Noah Beery.

== Cast ==
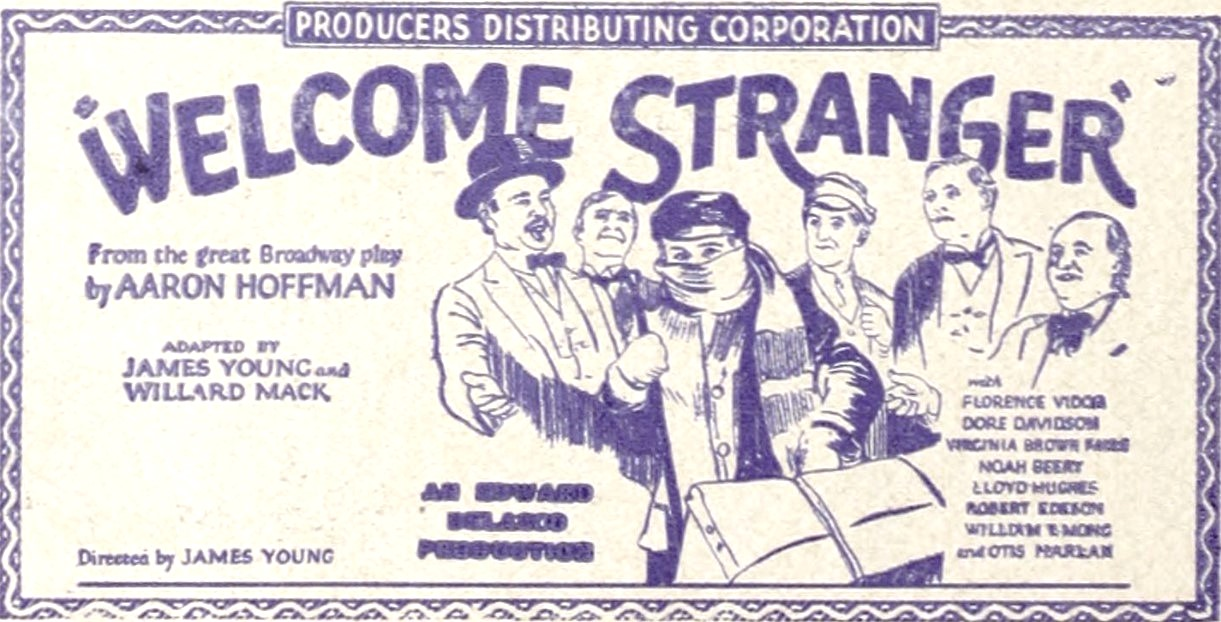
Advertisement with cast drawing (Noah Beery Sr. at left in derby)

- Dore Davidson as Isadore Solomon
- Florence Vidor as Mary Clark
- Virginia Brown Faire as Essie Solomon
- Noah Beery as Icahod Whitson
- Lloyd Hughes as Ned Tyler
- Robert Edeson as Eb Hooker
- William V. Mong as Clem Beemis
- Otis Harlan as Seth Trimble
- Fred J. Butler as Gideon Tyler
- Pat Hartigan as Detective
- Evelyn Sherman as Dowager (uncredited)

== Preservation ==
With no copies of Welcome Stranger located in any film archives, it is a lost film.
