= The Influence of a Child =

- Starring: Noah Beery; Marie Falls
- Release date: 1913
- Running time: Short
- Country: United States
- Languages: Silent film English intertitles

The Influence of a Child is a 1913 film featuring Noah Beery, Marie Falls, David Galley, Adelaide Lawrence, and Stephen Purdee. This extremely early short drama is notable as the first screen appearance of Noah Beery Sr., who portrays a burglar who takes a friend along to assist him in the robbery of a local saloon, which soon becomes a catastrophe.
