= The Way of All Men =

1930 film

- Theatrical poster
- Directed by: Frank Lloyd
- Screenplay by: Bradley King
- Based on: "The Sin Flood" by Henning Berger
- Produced by: Frank Lloyd
- Starring: Douglas Fairbanks Jr. Dorothy Revier; Noah Beery; Dorothy Mathews
- Cinematography: Sidney Hickox
- Edited by: Ray Curtiss
- Distributed by: First National Pictures, a subsidiary of Warner Bros. Pictures
- Release date: September 7, 1930 (U.S.)
- Running time: 69 minutes
- Country: United States
- Language: English

The Way of All Men is a 1930 American pre-Code drama film directed by Frank Lloyd and starring Douglas Fairbanks Jr., Dorothy Revier and Noah Beery. It was produced and released by First National Pictures, a subsidiary of Warner Bros. Pictures. The film was based on the story entitled "The Sin Flood", by Henning Berger and appeared as a silent in 1922 also directed by Frank Lloyd. In 1931, the studio remade the film in German as Die Maske fällt.

== Plot ==
Billy Bear is a broker's clerk who has recently been fired because some information has been leaked to a rival broker. Billy goes to work with the rival broker, offering him valuable information about his former employer. Fairbanks falls in love with his employer's daughter, Edna, a wealthy socialite. Billy abandons his old girlfriend, Poppy, who is a showgirl.

One a hot summer's day, Billy goes to a luxurious underground bar, run by Stratton. A tornado descends on the town, the river rises, and suddenly they find themselves trapped in the bar by a break in the levee which pours the flood waters through the streets of the town, which is situated below sea level.

A number of people flee into the bar just before the steel flood doors are closed and locked tight, making the place air-tight and safe from water. The film now focuses on the people trapped in the bar and how they act when they are facing circumstances where they are all facing death in a matter of hours. The majority of the trapped people completely change their normal way of acting and attempt to make amends for the things they regret having done. Billy asks Poppy for her forgiveness and professes his love for her. The two brokers, who have been lifelong enemies, shake hands. An ex-minister converts a crooked politician who had destroyed his home. Stratton's bartender confesses to him that he has been stealing money from the cash register. Stratton confesses that perhaps he hasn't been paying his bartender as much as he should have.

As everyone begins to realize that their oxygen is running out, they decide to open the flood gates, preferring a quick death to a drawn-out one. When the gates are open, everyone is surprised to find that the sun is shining and they are free from danger. The majority of those that were trapped quickly return to their original traits and old enmities are renewed once again. Billy, however, does not go back on his promise of marrying Poppy and the two are happily united.

== Cast ==
- Douglas Fairbanks Jr. as Billy Bear
- Dorothy Revier as Poppy
- Noah Beery as Stratton
- Dorothy Mathews as Edna
- Robert Edeson as Swift
- Anders Randolf as Frazer
- Ivan F. Simpson as Higgins
- William Orlamond as Nordling
- Wade Boteler as Charlie
- William Courtenay as Preacher

== Foreign-language version ==
Poster for Die Maske fällt

One foreign-language version of the 1930 version of The Way of All Men was produced. The German version was titled Die Maske fällt (lit. The Mask Falls) and was directed by William Dieterle. It starred Lissy Arna, Anton Pointner and Karl Etlinger.

== Preservation status ==
No film elements are known to survive. Only stills and advertising material like lantern slides, lobby posters and window cards survive as visual elements. The soundtrack, which was recorded on Vitaphone disks, may survive in private hands.

== See also ==
- List of lost films
- List of early Warner Bros. sound and talking features

== Bibliography ==
- Waldman, Harry. Missing Reels: Lost Films of American and European Cinema. McFarland, 2000.
