= Hazel Terry =

English actress (1918–1974)

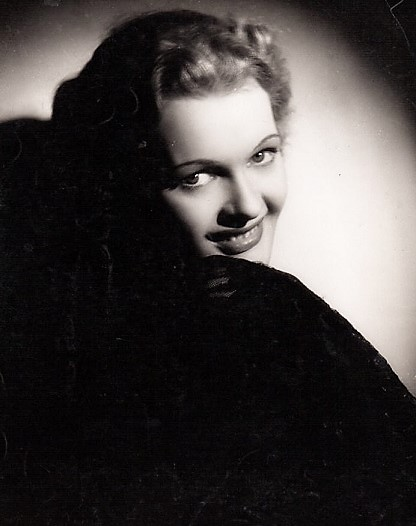
- Terry in 1938
- Born: Hazel M. Neilson-Terry; 23 January 1918; London, England
- Died: 12 October 1974 (aged 56); London, England
- Occupation: Actress
- Years active: 1935–1965
- Spouses: Geoffrey Keen (m. 1940; div. 19??); David Evans (m. 1948)
- Children: 1
- Parents: Dennis Neilson-Terry (father); Mary Glynne (mother)
- Relatives: Sir John Gielgud (cousin)

Hazel M. Neilson-Terry (23 January 1918 – 12 October 1974) was an English actress. A member of the theatrical dynasty the Terry family she had a successful stage career, and also made some cinema films. Among her roles was Ophelia in Hamlet opposite her cousin John Gielgud.

== Life and career ==
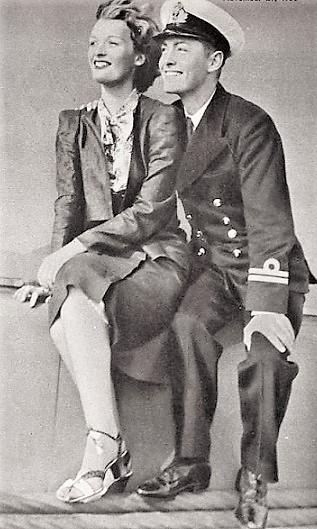
Terry with Richard Cromwell in Our Fighting Navy (1937)

Terry was born in London, the daughter of the actor Dennis Neilson-Terry and his wife, actress Mary Glynne. Her only sibling was her sister Monica Julia Glassborow née Neilson-Terry (died 1984). Hazel's first role was at the age of 17 as the page in Henry IV, Part I with George Robey as Falstaff at His Majesty's in 1936. Later in that year she played Beauty in Everyman.

As her cousin John Gielgud had done early in his career, she joined the Oxford Repertory company; her roles included Olivia in Twelfth Night. In 1938 she made her New York debut playing Hazel in J B Priestley's Time and the Conways, later repeating the role on tour in Britain. She made her film debut in 1935 in The Marriage of Corbal.

In the 1938 Malvern Festival season she appeared in The Last Trump, which transferred to the West End. Following what The Times called "various unremarkable engagements" she starred in a year-long ENSA tour as Amanda in Noël Coward's Private Lives. In 1944 she understudied Peggy Ashcroft as Ophelia in Gielgud's last London Hamlet, and had the chance to play the role in Manchester and London.

After World War II, her roles included Lydia in Coward's Peace in Our Time (1947), the Queen in Terence Rattigan's Adventure Story (1949), and Mesita in The Seagull (1949). The obituarist in The Times wrote, "After absence from the theatre during much of the fifties, she was uncommonly good as the housekeeper, an exacting part, in the fine cast (John Gielgud and Ralph Richardson among it) that brought Enid Bagnold's The Last Joke to the Phoenix in September, 1960." In 1961 she played Rachel in The Irregular Verb To Love in the West End.

== Personal life ==
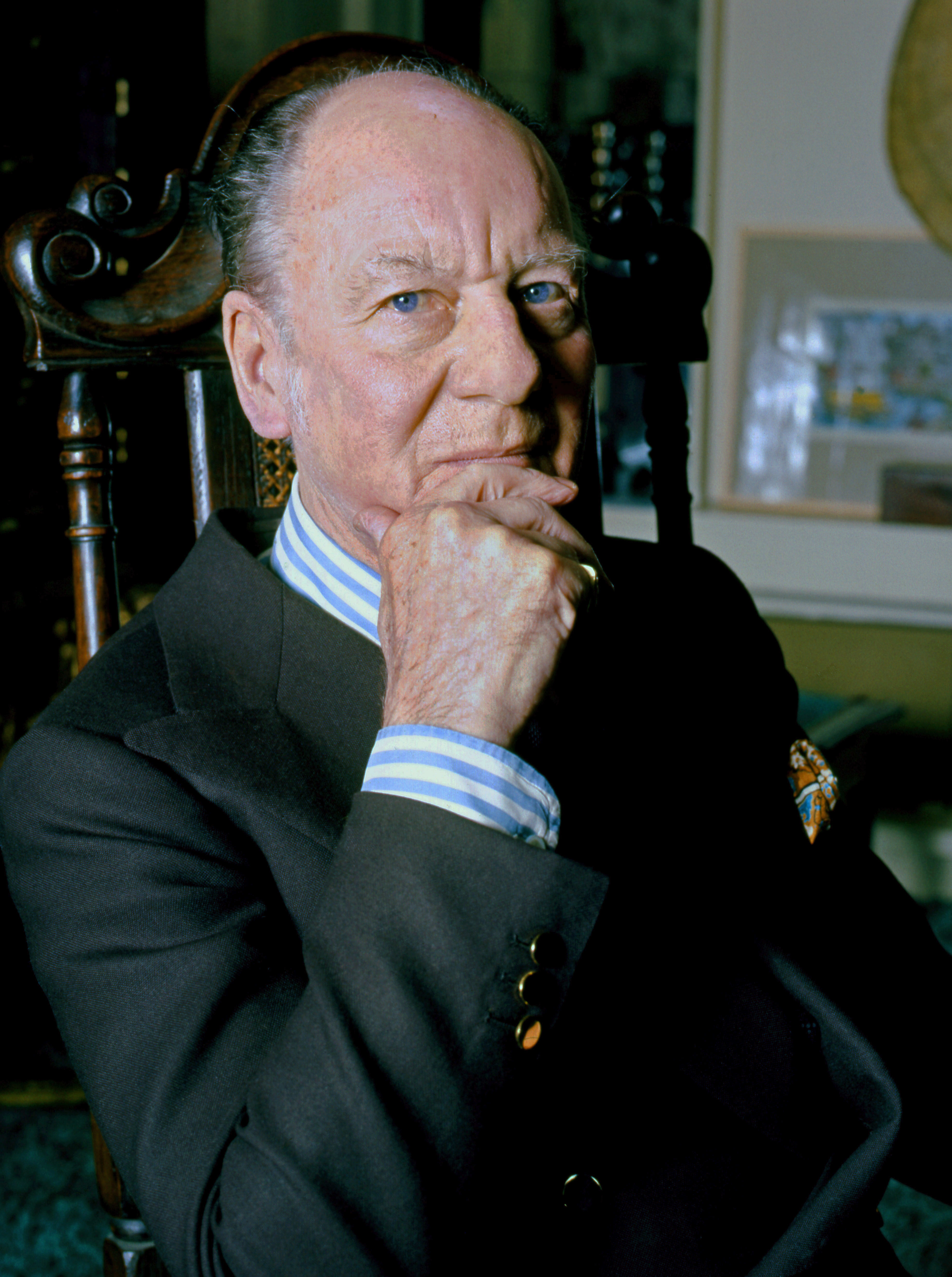
Hazel's fellow actor and cousin Sir John Gielgud

Terry was married, first to the actor Geoffrey Keen and then to David Evans. Her daughter, Jemma Hyde (1941–2017), became an actress. Hazel Terry committed suicide at the age of 56. An inquest heard how she had taken a large dose of valium and had been an alcoholic for many years.

== Selected filmography ==
- The Marriage of Corbal (1935)
- Our Fighting Navy (1937)
- Missing, Believed Married (1937)
- Sweet Devil (1938)
- Kill or Cure (1962)
- The Servant (1963)
