= The Prisoner of Corbal =

1936 film directed by Karl Grune

- British poster
- Directed by: Karl Grune
- Written by: S. Fullman
- Based on: the novel The Nuptials of Corbal by Rafael Sabatini
- Produced by: Max Schach
- Starring: Nils Asther; Hugh Sinclair; Hazel Terry; Noah Beery
- Cinematography: Otto Kanturek
- Edited by: Walter Stokvis
- Music by: Allan Gray
- Production company: Capitol Film Corporation
- Distributed by: General Film Distributors (UK)
- Release date: 28 May 1936 (London)
- Running time: 93 minutes
- Country: United Kingdom
- Language: English

The Prisoner of Corbal is a 1936 British historical drama film directed by Karl Grune and starring Nils Asther, Hugh Sinclair and Hazel Terry. It is also known by the alternative title The Marriage of Corbal. It is set against the backdrop of the French Revolution.

The film was made at British and Dominions Elstree Studios as an independent production which was released by General Film Distributors. The film is based on the 1927 novel The Nuptials of Corbal by Rafael Sabatini.

== Plot ==
The aristocrat Cleonie is the object of affection for both the Marquis of Corbal and Citizen-Deputy of the revolution, Varennes. The latter saves Cleonie from the guillotine by disguising her as his nephew and smuggling her out of France.

== Cast ==
- Nils Asther as Varennes
- Hugh Sinclair as Marquis of Corbal
- Hazel Terry as Cleonie
- Noah Beery as The Sergeant
- Ernst Deutsch as The Fugitive
- Davy Burnaby as Pierre
- Clifford McLaglen as Jean
- Arthur Rigby as Major
- Ralph Truman as Charles
- Brian Buchel as Roger
- Gordon Begg as Shepherd
- Vincent Sternroyd as Deaf Peasant
- Charles Paton as French Commandant
- Percy Walsh as Gamekeeper
- Walter Sondes as Chaplain
- Hubert Leslie as General
- Moyna Lynd as Hostess at Inn

== Critical reception ==
Writing for The Spectator in 1936, Graham Greene described the film as "incredibly silly and incredibly badly written but [with] a kind of wide-eyed innocence [...] which is almost endearing". Greene characterized the dialogue as "the worst I have heard these twelve months", and criticized the scenario and acting (which he attributed to the direction). Acknowledging the praise for this film from other reviewers Greene expressed concerns that other reviews may have been tainted by the presence of money.

TV Guide noted, "some racy bedroom scenes were clipped for the US release. The actors suffer from miscasting, but Asther gives an outstanding performance. Interesting use of camera angles stands out, as does the direction of the crowd scenes."
