= Our Fighting Navy =

- American poster
- Directed by: Norman Walker
- Written by: H.T. Bishop; Gerald Elliott; Harrison Owen; Guy Pollock; L. DeCosta Ricci
- Produced by: Herbert Wilcox
- Starring: Robert Douglas; Richard Cromwell; Hazel Terry
- Cinematography: Claude Friese-Greene
- Edited by: Winifred Cooper
- Music by: Noel Gay
- Production company: Herbert Wilcox Productions
- Distributed by: General Film Distributors
- Release date: 21 April 1937
- Running time: 66 minutes (US release)
- Country: United Kingdom
- Language: English

Our Fighting Navy (also known as Torpedoed and The Navy Eternal) is a 1937 British action film directed by Norman Walker and starring Robert Douglas, Richard Cromwell and Hazel Terry. It was written by H.T. Bishop, Gerald Elliott, Harrison Owen, Guy Pollock and L. DeCosta Ricci.

== Plot ==
A British warship intervenes to protect British subjects and prevent a rebellion in a South American republic.

== Cast ==
- Robert Douglas as Captain Markham
- Richard Cromwell as Lieutenant Bill Armstrong
- Hazel Terry as Pamela Brent
- H.B. Warner as Brent, British Consul
- Noah Beery as Presidente of Bianco
- Esmé Percy as Diego de Costa
- Frederick Culley as Admiral
- Henry Victor as Lieutenant d'Enriquo
- Binkie Stuart as Jennifer
- Julie Suedo as Juanita
- Richard Ainley as Lieutenant (uncredited)

== Production ==
The film was made by Herbert Wilcox Productions at Pinewood Studios. The film's sets were designed by the art director Lawrence P. Williams.

The film's credits state that the Royal Navy provided warships and extras.

== Release ==
It was given an American release in 1938 with a reduced running time. The dialogue adaptation for the French dub version was carried out by Jean Devaivre and the film was released in France under the title Choc en mer (Shock at Sea) in 1938.

== Reception ==
The Monthly Film Bulletin wrote: "The story and the dialogue might have been taken from a boy's magazine, the love interest is weak and lamely told, so that we do not mind about the heroine's plight, and the actors are not given enough to do to show themselves to advantage. The film is neither good entertainment nor effective propaganda."

Kine Weekly wrote: "In many ways the film is schoolboy stuff – the plot is naive and the scene of much of the action is reminiscent of comic opera – but by making the most of Service co-operation and resolutely sounding the patriotic note it finally aspires to pretty good mass entertainment. The acting of the principals is above the average, and there is a spectacular culminating thrill. ... Robert Douglas is rather young for the role of naval captain, but he, nevertheless, puts over a sound portrayal; H. B. Warner is dignified as Brent, and Noah Beery and Esme Percy are good as the President and rebel leader respectively ... Topographically the film is artificial, and the development is not too clear, but the detail is occasionally graphic, the machinery of modern warfare is adequately displayed and spectacle comes at the right place, the climax. The authentic trimmings, shrewdly tinged with appropriate sentiment, cover many of the narratal shortcomings."
