= Stewart Edward White =

American novelist, writer (1873–1946)

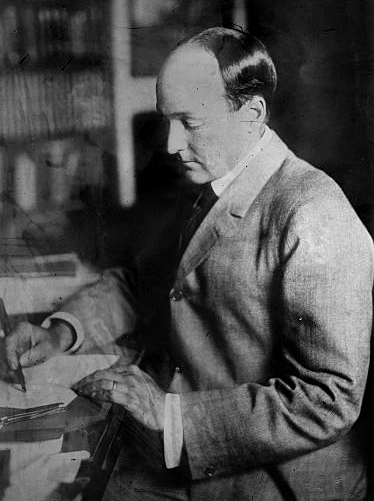
- Stewart Edward White, 1912
- Born: March 12, 1873; Grand Rapids, Michigan, United States
- Died: September 18, 1946 (aged 73); Hillsborough, California
- Education: University of Michigan
- Occupation: Author
- Writing career
- Period: 1901 to 1940
- Genres: Paranormal, adventure, travel
- Notable work: The Unobstructed Universe
- Movement: New Age

Stewart Edward White (March 12, 1873 – September 18, 1946) was an American writer, novelist, and Spiritualist. He was a brother of noted mural painter Gilbert White.

== Early life ==
White was born in Grand Rapids, Michigan, the son of Mary E. (Daniell) and Thomas Stewart White, a lumberman. He attended Grand Rapids High School, and earned degrees from University of Michigan (B.A., 1895; M.A., 1903). White married Elizabeth Grant in 1904.

== Writer ==
From about 1900 until about 1922 he wrote fiction and non-fiction about adventure and travel, with an emphasis on natural history and outdoor living. Starting in 1922 he and his wife Elizabeth "Betty" Grant White wrote numerous books, that according to them, were received through channelling with spirits. They also wrote about their travels around the state of California.

Whenever you see a dust through the trees, you look first to make sure it is not raised by stray cattle. Then when you are certain of your horse and man, you start a fire in the little stove. That is the invariable rule in the mountains. The logic is simple, unanswerable, and correct. The presence of the man argues that he has ridden from some distant point, for here all points are more or less distant; and the fact in turn proves that somewhat of exercise and space have intervened last he has eaten. Therefore, no matter what the time of day, you feed him. It works out like a mathematical formula.

— From "On Strangers", The Cabin, 1911

== Death ==
White died in Hillsborough, California, on September 18, 1946, at the age of 73.

== Writing ==
White's books were popular at a time when America was losing its vanishing wilderness. He was a keen observer of the beauties of nature and human nature, yet could render them in a plain-spoken style. Based on his own experience, whether writing camping journals or Westerns, he included pithy and fun details about cabin-building, canoeing, logging, gold-hunting, and guns and fishing and hunting. He also interviewed people who had been involved in the fur trade, the California Gold Rush and other pioneers which provided him with details that give his novels verisimilitude. He salted in humor and sympathy for colorful characters such as canny Indian guides and "greenhorn" campers who carried too much gear. White also illustrated some of his books with his own photographs, while some of his other books were illustrated by artists, such as the American Western painter Fernand Lungren for The Mountains and Camp and Trail. Theodore Roosevelt wrote that White was "the best man with both pistol and rifle who ever shot" at Roosevelt's rifle range at Sagamore Hill.

The Long Rifle (1930), Folded Hills (1932), Ranchero (1933), and Stampede (1942) constitute The Saga of Andy Burnett, which follows a young Pennsylvania farm boy who escapes his overbearing stepfather by running away to the West with grandmother's blessing and "The Boone Gun", the original Kentucky rifle carried by Daniel Boone. He encounters mountain man Joe Crane, who becomes his mentor in the ways of survival in the wild. The remainder of the saga follows Andy as he moves west, ultimately settling in California, which is the setting of the last three books. The series incorporates actual events and characters from the time period in the narrative. The four stories were published as a posthumous volume, The Saga of Andy Burnett, in 1947, and were adapted into several episodes of The Wonderful World of Disney during 1957 and 1958, starring Jerome Courtland as Andy Burnett, and Jeff York (Mike Fink) as his friend and mentor Joe Crane. This series was in many ways a follow-up to Disney's much more successful Davy Crockett.

== Honors ==
In 1927, the Boy Scouts of America made White an Honorary Scout, a new category of Scout created the same year. This distinction was given to "American citizens whose achievements in outdoor activity, exploration and worthwhile adventure are of such an exceptional character as to capture the imagination of boys...". The other eighteen who were awarded this distinction were: Roy Chapman Andrews; Robert Bartlett; Frederick Russell Burnham; Richard E. Byrd; George Kruck Cherrie; James L. Clark; Merian C. Cooper; Lincoln Ellsworth; Louis Agassiz Fuertes; George Bird Grinnell; Charles A. Lindbergh; Donald Baxter MacMillan; Clifford H. Pope; George P. Putnam; Kermit Roosevelt; Carl Rungius; Orville Wright.

== Works ==
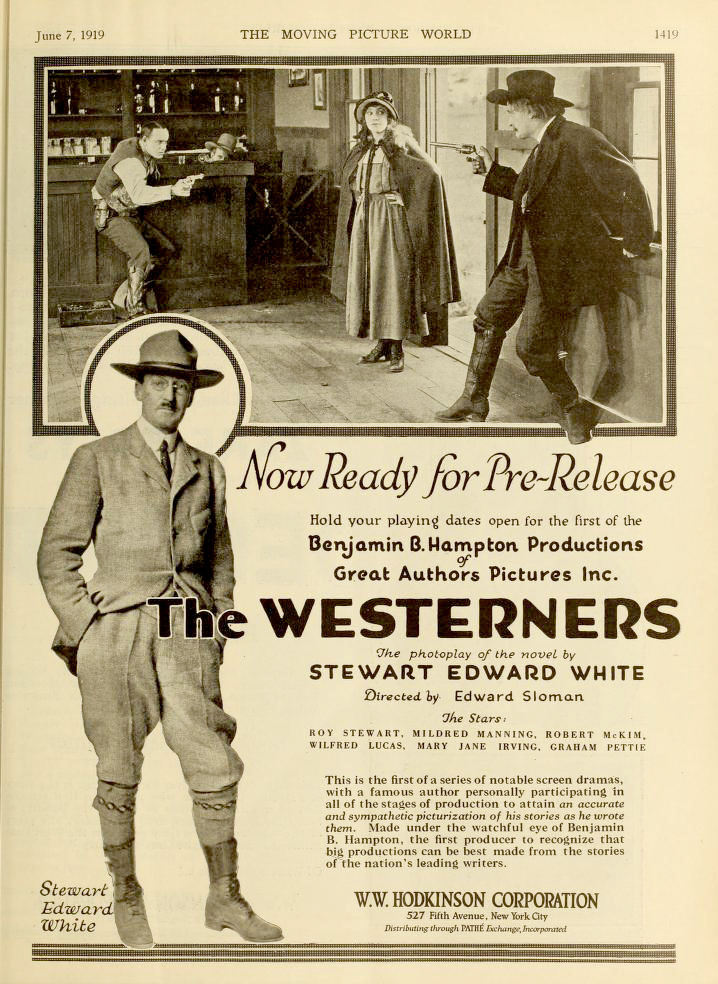
Advertising (1919) for a film based on The Westerners

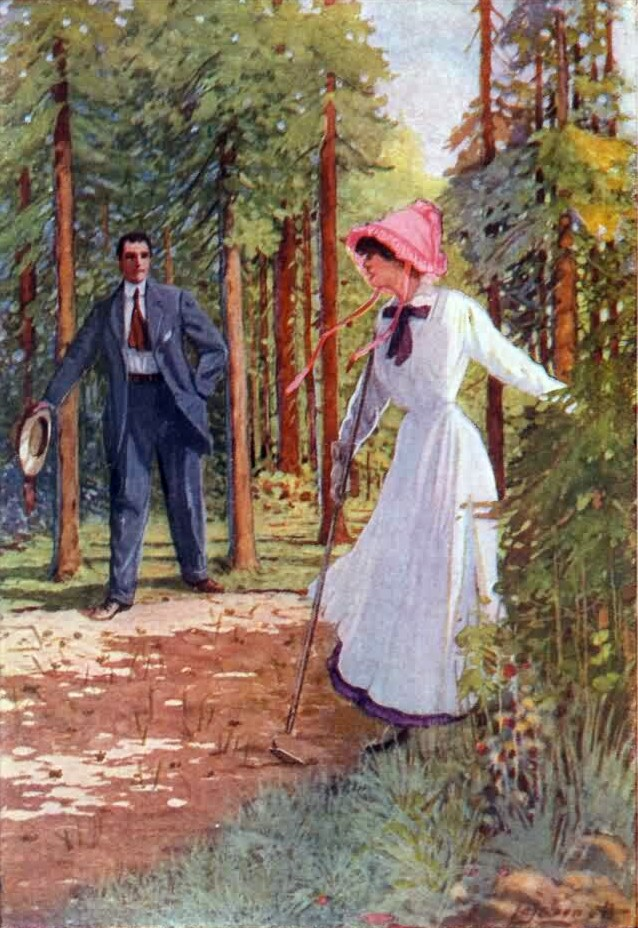
From Rules of the Game by Stewart Edward White, illustrated by Lejaren Hiller Sr. (1880–1969)

- The Westerners (1901)
- The Claim Jumpers (1901)
- The Blazed Trail (1902)
- The Call of the North (1902)
- The Conjuror's House (1903)
- The Magic Forest: A Modern Fairy Story (1903)
- Blazed Trail Stories (1904)
- The Forest (1904)
- The Mountains (1904)
- The Silent Places (1904)
- The Pass (1906), with S. H. Adams
- The Mystery (1907), with S. H. Adams
- Arizona Nights (1907)
- Camp and Trail (1907)
- The Riverman (1908)
- The Cabin (1910)
- The Adventures of Bobby Orde (1910)
- Rules of the Game (1910) (sequel to The Adventures of Bobby Orde)
- The Sign at Six (1912)
- The Land of Footprints (1912)
- African Camp Fires (1913)
- Gold (1913)
- The Gray Dawn (1915)
- Rediscovered Country (1915)
- Simba (1917)
- The Forty-Niners; A Chronicle of the California Trail and El Dorado (1918)
- The Killer (1919)
- The Rose Dawn (1920)
- Daniel Boone, Wilderness Scout (1922)
- "The Glory Hole" (1924)
- Skookum Chuck (1925)
- Lions in the Path; A Book of Adventure on the High Veldt (1926)
- Back of Beyond (1926)
- Secret Harbour (1926)
- Dog Days, Other Times, Other Dogs; The Autobiography of a Man and His Dog Friends Through Four Decades of Changing America (1930)
- The Long Rifle (1930)
- "The Shepper-Newfounder" (1931)
- Folded Hills (1932)
- “The Saga of Andy Burnett” (1933)
- Ranchero (1933)
- Pole Star (1935), with Harry DeVighne
- Wild Geese Calling (1940)
- Stampede (1942)

=== The Psychic Books ===
- Credo (1925)
- Why Be a Mud Turtle (1928)

These first two books are "pre" Betty's book. White discusses the philosophy of the future books, without revealing the source (the channeling through his wife Betty).

- The Betty Book (1937)
- Across the Unknown (1939), with Harwood White
- The Unobstructed Universe (1940) (Considered the most important of the collection)
- The Road I Know (1942)
- Anchors to Windward (1943)
- The Stars are Still There (1946)
- With Folded Wings (1947)
- The job of living (1948)
- The Gaelic Manuscripts

=== Nonfiction ===
- The Birds of Mackinac Island
- Speaking For Myself (1943)

== Filmography ==
- The Call of the North, directed by Cecil B. DeMille and Oscar Apfel (1914, based on the novel The Conjuror's House)
- The Westerners, directed by Edward Sloman (1919, based on the novel The Westerners)
- The Leopard Woman, directed by Wesley Ruggles (1920, based on the novel The Leopard Woman)
- The Killer, directed by Jack Conway and Howard Hickman (1921, based on the novel The Killer)
- The Call of the North, directed by Joseph Henabery (1921, based on the novel The Conjuror's House)
- The Gray Dawn (1922, based on the novel The Gray Dawn)
- The Two-Gun Man, directed by David Kirkland (1926, based on the novel Two-Gun Man)
- Arizona Nights, directed by Lloyd Ingraham (1927, based on a story by Stewart Edward White)
- Under a Texas Moon, directed by Michael Curtiz (1930, based on the novel Two-Gun Man)
- Part Time Wife, directed by Leo McCarey (1930, based on the story The Shepper-Newfounder)
- Mystery Ranch, directed by David Howard (1932, based on the novel The Killer)
- Change of Heart, directed by James Tinling (1938, based on the story The Shepper-Newfounder)
- Wild Geese Calling, directed by John Brahm (1941, based on the novel Wild Geese Calling)
- Walt Disney: Saga of Andy Burnett, directed by Lewis R. Foster (1957–1958, TV miniseries, based on the novel The Long Rifle)
