= Belle of Alaska =

1922 film

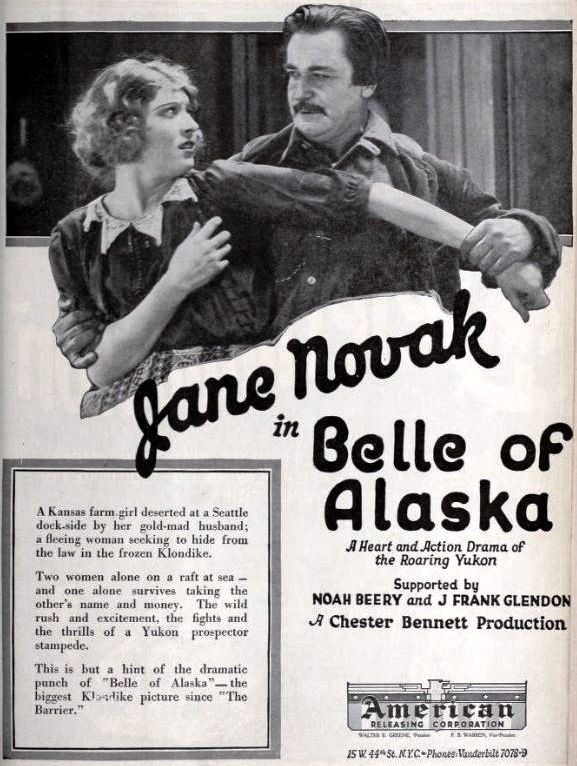
- Jane Novak and Noah Beery Sr.
- Directed by: Chester Bennett
- Written by: J. Grubb Alexander; Harvey Gates
- Produced by: Chester Bennett
- Starring: J. Frank Glendon; Jane Novak; Noah Beery Sr.
- Cinematography: Jack MacKenzie
- Production company: Chester Bennett Productions
- Distributed by: American Releasing Corporation
- Release date: March 5, 1922
- Running time: 50 minutes
- Country: United States
- Languages: Silent; English intertitles

Belle of Alaska is a 1922 American silent Western film directed by Chester Bennett and starring J. Frank Glendon, Jane Novak and Noah Beery.

== Plot ==
A Kansas farmer and his wife leave for Alaska to take part in the Klondike Gold Rush, but she becomes separated from him and ends up working in a dance hall owned by the gambler Lucky Vail.

== Cast ==
- J. Frank Glendon as Lucky Vail
- Jane Novak as Ruth Harkin
- Noah Beery Sr. as Wade Harkin
- Florence Carpenter as Chicago Belle
- Les Bates as Dugan

== Censorship ==
Before Belle of Alaska could be exhibited in Kansas, the Kansas Board of Review required the removal of a scene where a man is unbuttoning his coat before he assaults a woman.

== Preservation ==
Belle of Alaska is currently presumed lost. In February of 2021, the film was cited by the National Film Preservation Board on their Lost U.S. Silent Feature Films list.
