= Under a Texas Moon =

1930 film

- Film poster
- Directed by: Michael Curtiz
- Written by: Gordon Rigby; Stewart Edward White (Novel)
- Starring: Frank Fay; Raquel Torres; Myrna Loy; Noah Beery
- Cinematography: William Rees (Technicolor)
- Edited by: Ralph Dawson
- Music by: Ray Perkins
- Distributed by: Warner Bros. Pictures
- Release date: April 1, 1930
- Running time: 82 minutes
- Country: United States
- Language: English

Under A Texas Moon is a 1930 American pre-Code musical Western film directed by Michael Curtiz, distributed by Warner Bros. Pictures, and photographed entirely in Technicolor. It was based on the novel Two-Gun Man (from 1929) which was written by Stewart Edward White. It was the second all-color, all-talking feature to be filmed entirely outdoors, as well as being the second all-color all-talking Western feature. The film features one theme song by the title of "Under A Texas Moon."

== Plot ==
Frank Fay, as a Mexican named Don Carlos, rides into a small Texas border settlement on the Fourth of July in the early 1880s. He is accompanied by his two inseparable companions, played by Georgie Stone and George Cooper. The day is being celebrated in the style of a Spanish fiesta. Fay challenges a rough Texan, played by Noah Beery, to a duel, only to find himself invited to undertake the dangerous task of capturing a cattle rustler who has been stealing cattle from the Lazy Y Ranch. He accepts the task on the promise of receiving $7,000 in gold if he can return both the thief and the stolen cattle within 10 days.

During the next nine days, Fay spends his time making love to every pretty girl he meets, serenading many of them by singing the theme song to the film while playing his guitar, while his two companions join in the harmonizing. He lies to them all, telling each girl exactly what she wishes to hear. Throughout all this time, he does nothing towards earning his reward. On the 10th day, he captures the cattle rustler and turns up the cattle to everyone's surprise by using a simple method of which no one had thought. He rides back to Mexico with his latest conquest in his arms.

== Cast ==
- Frank Fay as Don Carlos
- Raquel Torres as Raquella
- Myrna Loy as Lolita Romero
- Armida as Dolores
- Noah Beery as Jed Parker
- Georgie Stone as Pedro
- George Cooper as Philipe
- Charles Sellon as José Romero
- Jack Curtis as Buck Johnson
- Sam Appel as Pancho Gonzalez
- Tully Marshall as Gus Aldrich
- Mona Maris as Lolita Roberto

== Preservation ==
The film survives as a single nitrate Technicolor print, copied by the UCLA Film and Television Archive.

== Response ==
New York Latinos led by Gonzalo González protested the film, characterizing it as "anti-Mexican" mainly because Frank Fay portrayed Mexicans as being liars and womanizers. Police brutalized the picketers, killing González. The murder sparked a pan-Latino protest, in which the Latino civil rights activist Luisa Moreno participated. She later told Bert Corona that the experience "motivated her to work on behalf of unifying the Spanish-speaking communities."

== See also ==
- List of early color feature films
