= The Nuptials of Corbal =

1927 novel

- First edition (UK)
- Author: Rafael Sabatini
- Language: English
- Genre: Historical; Adventure
- Publisher: Hutchinson (UK); Houghton Mifflin (US)
- Publication date: 1927
- Publication place: United Kingdom
- Media type: Print

The Nuptials of Corbal is a 1927 historical adventure novel by the British writer Rafael Sabatini. Set during the French Revolution, it portrays the escapades of a Frenchman who saves condemned prisoners from the guillotine.

== Film adaptation ==
In 1936 the story was adapted into a British film The Marriage of Corbal directed by Karl Grune and starring Nils Asther.

== Bibliography ==
- Goble, Alan. The Complete Index to Literary Sources in Film. Walter de Gruyter, 1999.
