= The Call of the North (1921 film) =

1921 film

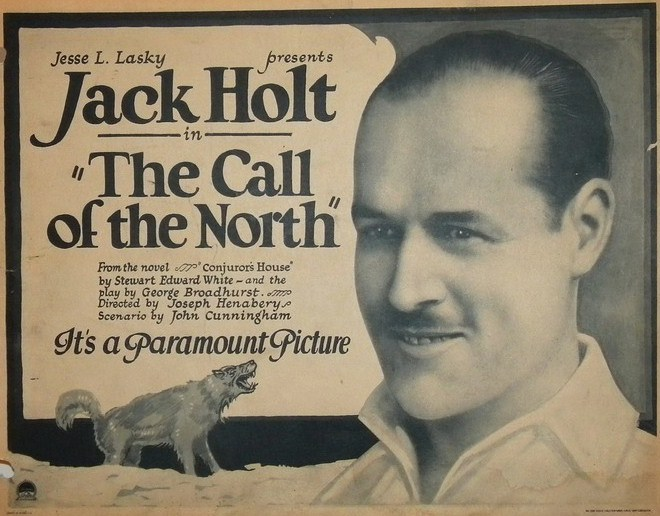
- Period advertisement
- Directed by: Joseph Henabery
- Written by: Jack Cunningham
- Based on: The Conjuror's House: a Romance of the Free Forest by Stewart Edward White
- Produced by: Adolph Zukor; Jesse Lasky
- Starring: Jack Holt; Madge Bellamy
- Cinematography: Faxon M. Dean
- Distributed by: Paramount Pictures
- Release date: November 27, 1921
- Running time: 50 minutes; 5 reels
- Country: United States
- Language: Silent (English intertitles)

The Call of the North is a 1921 American silent drama film produced by Famous Players–Lasky and distributed by Paramount Pictures. It was directed by Joseph Henabery and stars Jack Holt. It is based on the 1903 novel The Conjuror's House: a Romance of the Free Forest by Stewart Edward White and its 1908 play adaptation The Call of the North by George Broadhurst starring Robert Edeson. This film is a remake of an earlier 1914 version directed by Cecil B. DeMille. It is not known whether the film currently survives.

== Plot ==
As described in a film magazine, Ned Trent, a free trader who has successfully opposed the iron rule of the Hudson's Bay Company factor Galen Albret, is captured and brought to the trading post. They plan to keep Trent there until the first snowfall and then send him out upon the long trail without any food or rifle, a custom said to be followed by agents of the company. Defying the factor, Trent falls in love with the factor's daughter Virginia and finds his affection reciprocated. When her attempt to aid Trent to escape brings her father to the verge of murder, it is discovered that Albret had been responsible for the death of Trent's father many years earlier. However, in the end, the complex situation is worked out logically to a satisfactory end.

== Cast ==
- Jack Holt as Ned Trent
- Madge Bellamy as Virginia Albret
- Noah Beery as Galen Albret
- Francis McDonald as Achille Picard
- Edward Martindel as Graham Stewart
- Helen Ferguson as Elodie Albret
- Jack Herbert as Louis Placide
