= Robert Edeson =

American actor (1868–1931)

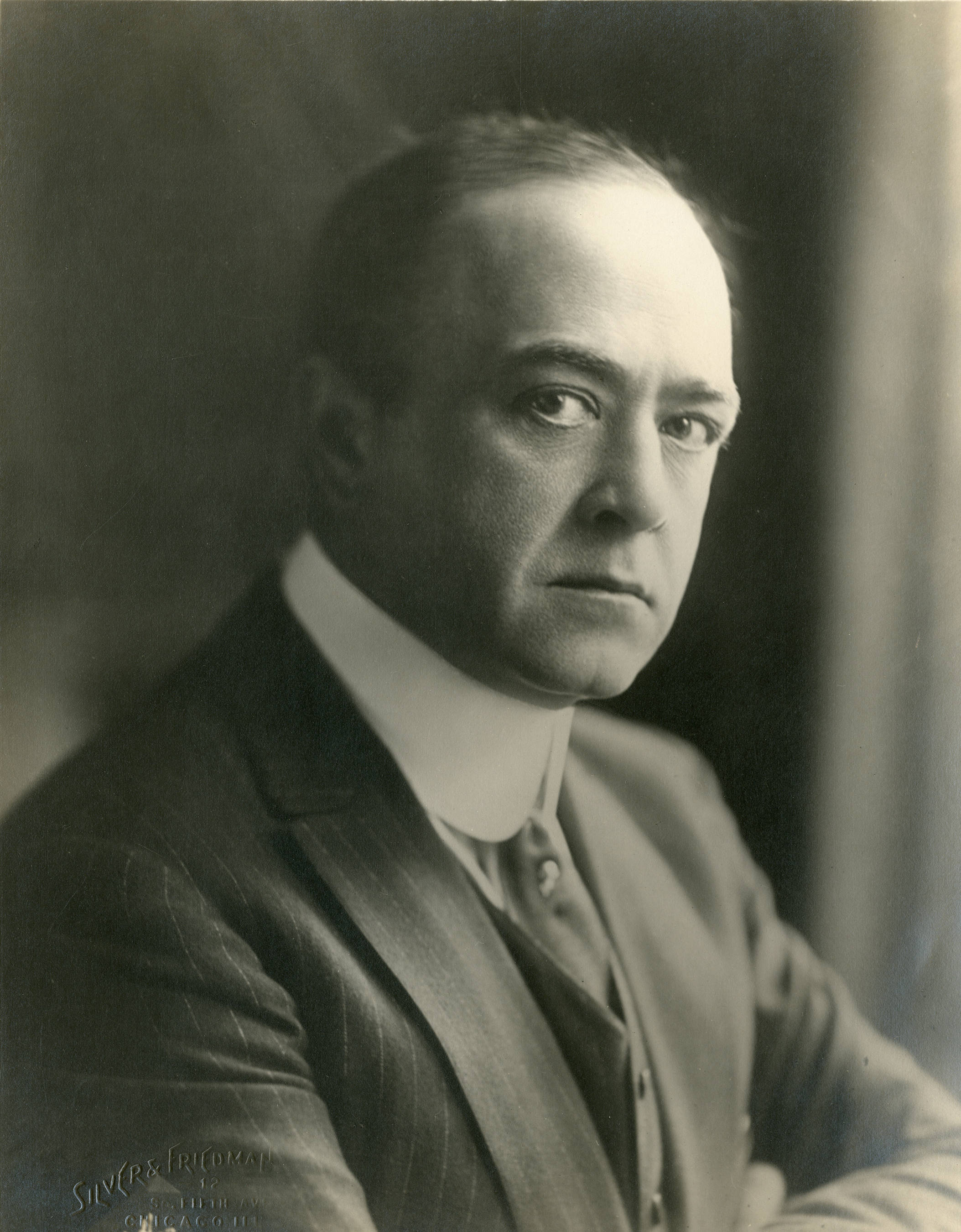
- Edeson in 1913
- Born: June 3, 1868; New Orleans, Louisiana, U.S.
- Died: March 24, 1931 (aged 62); Hollywood, California, U.S.
- Occupation: Actor
- Years active: 1912–1931

Robert Edeson (June 3, 1868 – March 24, 1931) was an American film and stage actor of the silent era and a vaudeville performer.

== Life and career ==
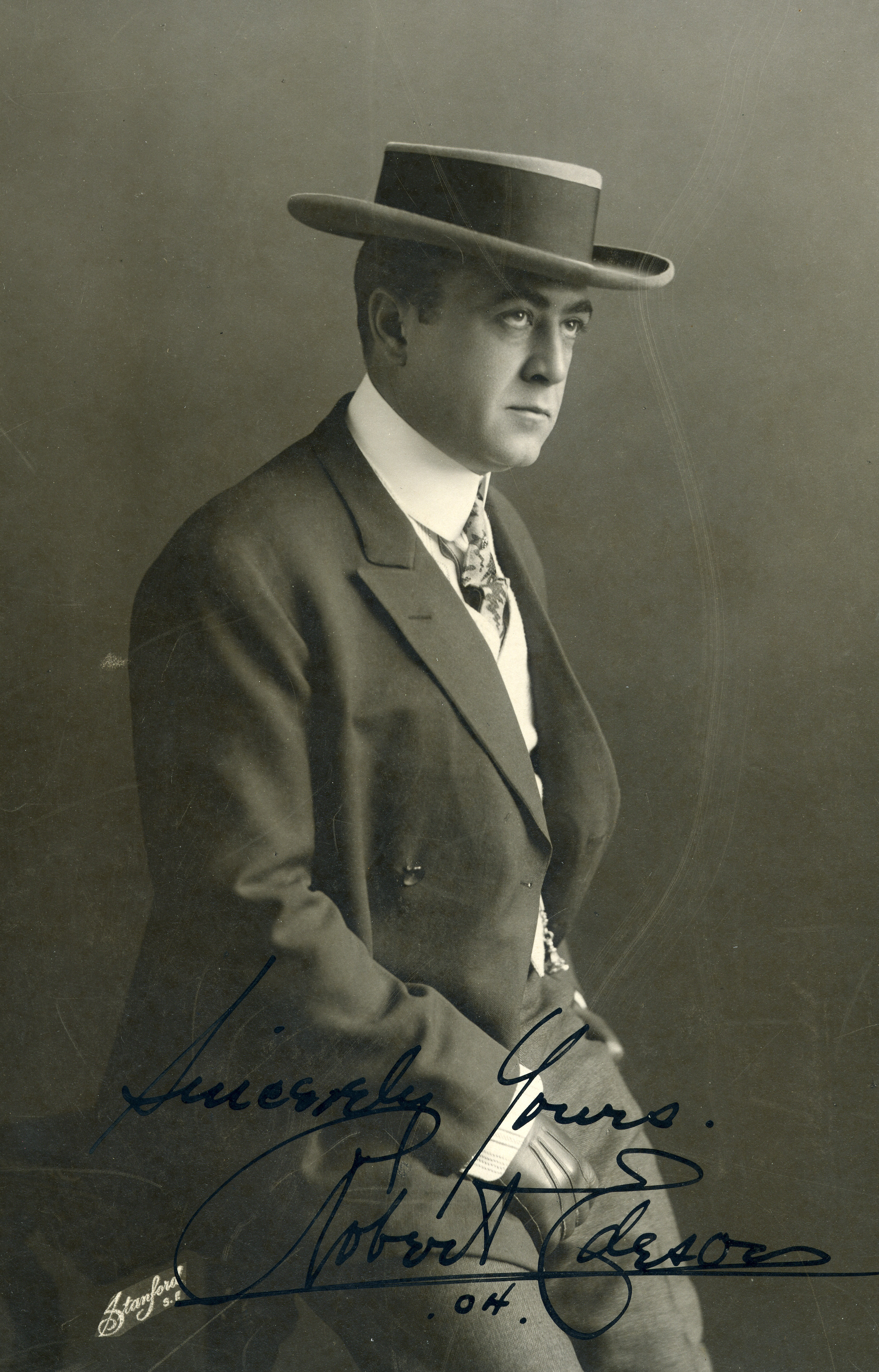
Robert Edeson

Edeson was born in New Orleans, Louisiana, the son of manager and actor George R. Edeson. After working as treasurer of the Park Theatre in Brooklyn, he initially acted in New York in 1887 in a production of Fascination. He debuted on Broadway in Marriage (1896). In 1901 he created the role Edward Warden in the original production of Clyde Fitch's The Climbers. His last Broadway appearance was in The World We Live In (1922). He also performed in vaudeville.

Edeson received his first boost in films in 1914 when he starred in the Cecil B. DeMille directed film, The Call of the North (1914).

Edeson replaced actor Rudolph Christians in Erich von Stroheim's production of Foolish Wives (1922), after Christians died of pneumonia. Edeson famously only showed his back to the camera so as not to clash with shot footage of Christians that was still to be used in the completed film.

Edeson's final film was Aloha (1931).

His third wife was the former Aida Banker.

== Death ==
On March 24, 1931, Edeson died at his home in Hollywood. He was 62 years old.

== Selected filmography ==
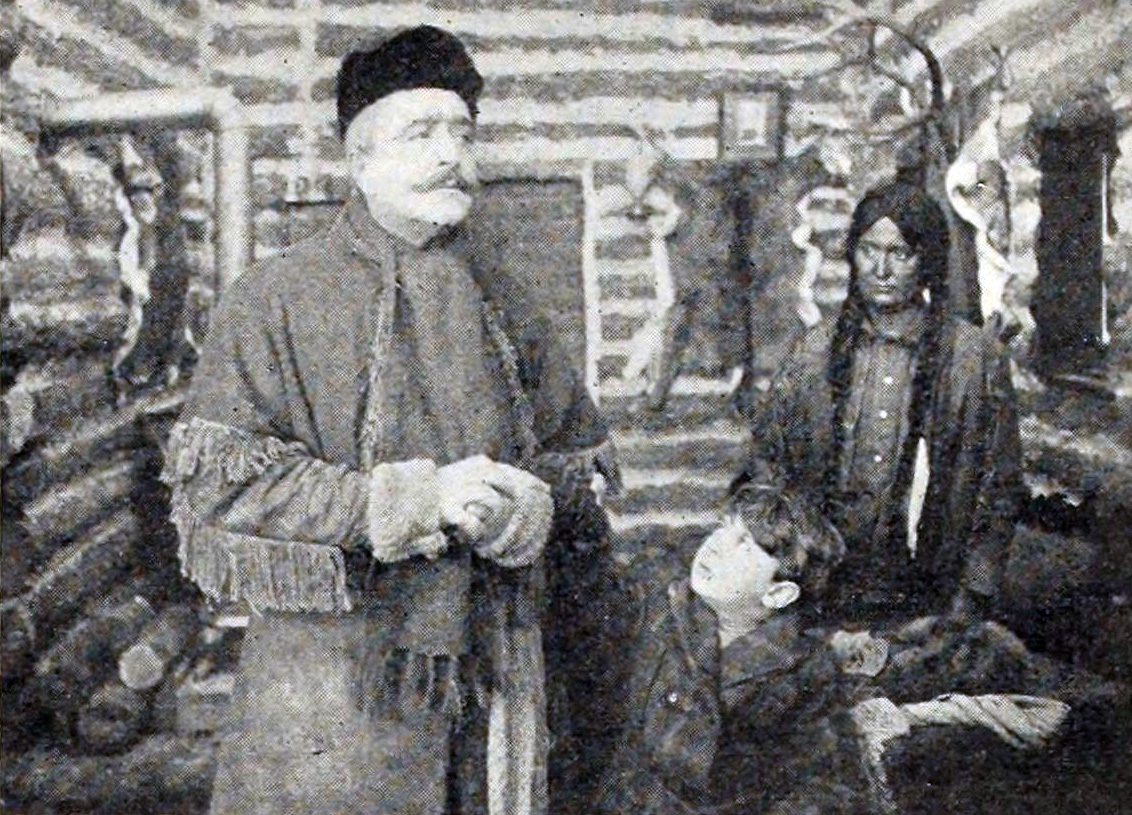
Fathers of Men (1916)

- The Paymaster's Son (1913) as The Paymaster's Son
- The Call of the North (1914) as Ned Stewart
- Where the Trail Divides (1914)
- The Absentee (1915) as Nathaniel Crosby
- The Light That Failed (1916) as Dick Hedlar
- Big Jim Garrity (1916) as Jim Garrity
- On the Night Stage (1915) as Austin
- The Caveman (1915) as Hanlick Smagg
- Public Defender (1917) as Arthur Nelson
- Extravagance (1921) as Richard Vane
- Foolish Wives (1922) as Andrew J. Hughes
- The Prisoner of Zenda (1922) as Colonel Zapta
- Sure Fire Flint (1922) as Anthony De Lanni
- Any Night (1922) as Jim Barton
- You Are Guilty (1923) as Theodore Tennent
- The Tie That Binds (1923) as Charles Dodge
- The Silent Partner (1923) as Ralph Coombes
- To the Last Man (1923) as Gaston Isbel
- The Ten Commandments (1923) as Inspector Redding
- Feet of Clay (1924) as Dr. Fergus Lansell
- Welcome Stranger (1924) as Eb Hooker
- Men (1924) as Henri Duval
- Triumph (1924) as Samuel Overton
- Thy Name Is Woman (1924) as The Commandante
- Missing Daughters (1924) as Secret Service Chief
- The Prairie Pirate (1925) as Don Esteban
- Men and Women (1925) as Israel Cohen
- The Golden Bed (1925) as Amos Thompson
- The Danger Signal (1925) as Cyprus Browning
- Go Straight (1925) as The Hawk
- Locked Doors (1925) as Norman Carter
- Blood and Steel (1925) as W.L. Grimshaw
- The Volga Boatman (1926) as Prince Nikita
- The Clinging Vine (1926) as T. M. Bancroft
- The Blue Eagle (1926) as Chaplain Regan
- The King of Kings (1927) as Matthew the Apostle
- Chicago (1927) as William Flynn
- Altars of Desire (1927) as John Sutherland
- The Night Bride (1927)
- George Washington Cohen (1928) as Mr. Gorman
- The Little Wildcat (1928
- A Ship Comes In (1928) as Judge Gresham
- Beware of Blondes (1928) as Costigan
- Walking Back (1928) as Edgar Thatcher
- Dynamite (1929) as Wise Fool
- Romance of the Rio Grande (1929) as Don Fernando
- Pardon My Gun (1930) as Pa Martin
- A Devil with Women (1930) as General Garcia
- Danger Lights (1930) as Tom Johnson
- The Lash (1930) as Don Mariana Delfine
- The Way of All Men (1930) Swift
- Swing High (1930)
