= Gilbert White (painter) =

American painter

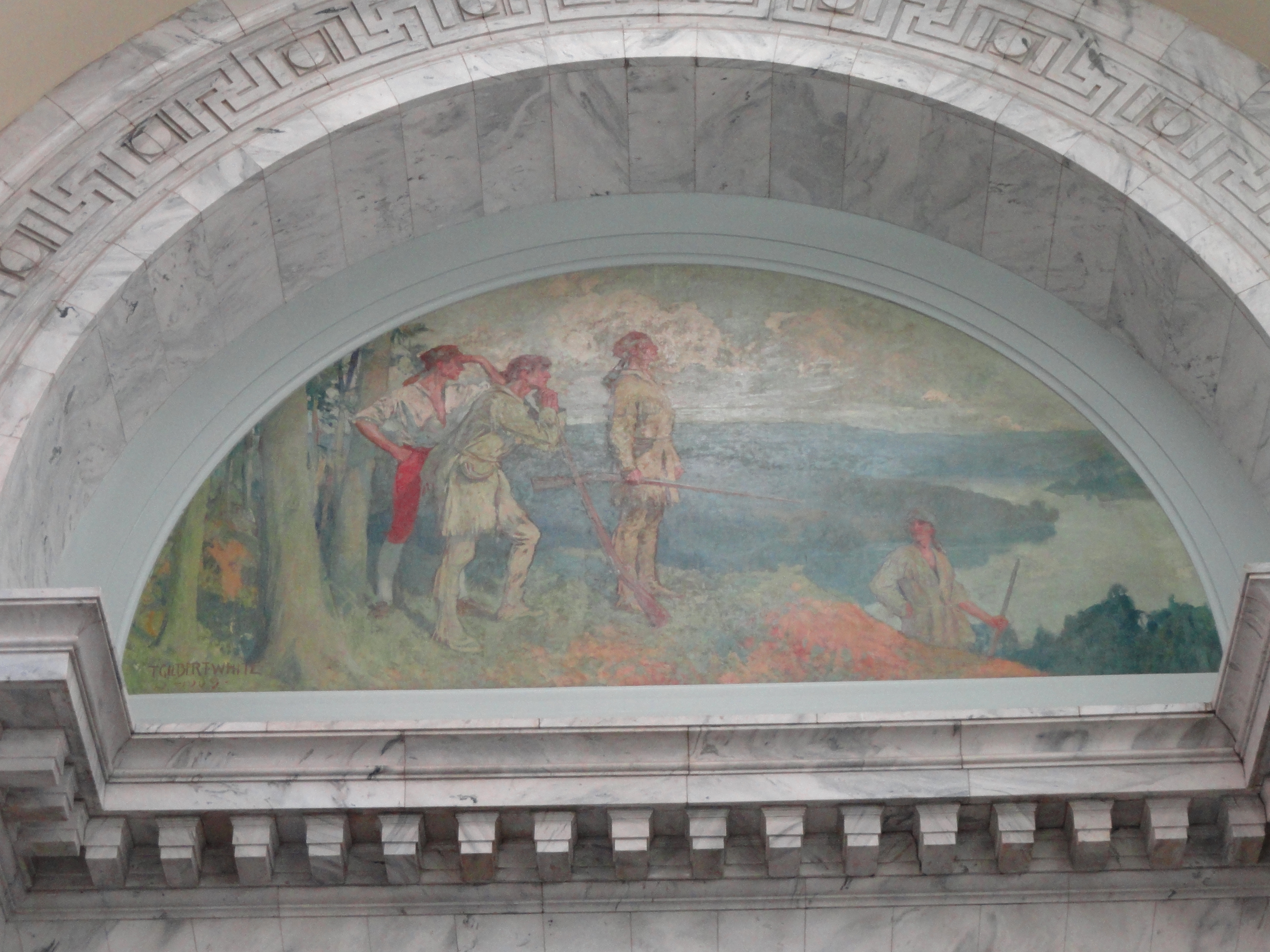
Mural of "Daniel Boone atop Pilot Knob" at Kentucky State Capitol

Thomas Gilbert White (July 18, 1877 – February 17, 1939) was an American painter, now best remembered for his murals. His brothers Stewart Edward White and Roderick White also achieved acclaim, as author and violinist, respectively.

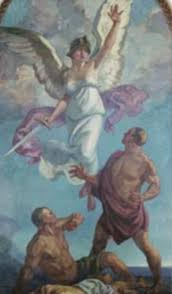
Thomas Gilbert White's mural of the Greek goddess Nemesis. Painted and installed by White in 1915. Located in the Federal Building, now known as the Campbell Professional Building, in Gadsden, Alabama.

White was born in Grand Haven, Michigan, and died in Paris. He studied at Columbia University and the Art Students League of New York, and at the Académie Julian and the Académie des Beaux-Arts in Paris with James McNeill Whistler. His work graces the state capitols of Kentucky, Oklahoma, and Utah; the County Courthouse in New Haven, Connecticut and Gadsden, Alabama; and the Pan American Union Building in Washington, D.C. He received numerous awards, among them the Commander de la Legion d’Honneur, Officier de l’Académie française, and the Order of the Purple Heart.
