= The Call of the North (1914 film) =

1914 film

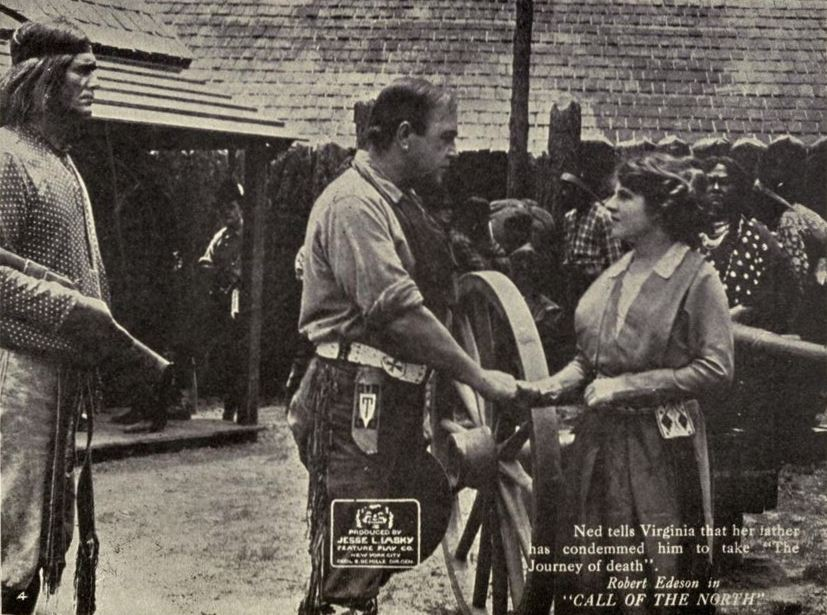
- Film still
- Directed by: Oscar Apfel; Cecil B. DeMille
- Written by: George Broadhurst (screenplay); Stewart Edward White (original novel)
- Produced by: Jesse L. Lasky Feature Play Co. Inc.
- Starring: Robert Edeson
- Cinematography: Alvin Wyckoff
- Edited by: Mamie Wagner
- Distributed by: Paramount Pictures
- Release date: August 10, 1914
- Running time: 5 reels
- Country: United States
- Language: Silent (English intertitles)

The Call of the North (1914) by Oscar Apfel and Cecil B. DeMille, extract

The Call Of The North (1914) Extant Part

The Call of the North is a 1914 American silent adventure-drama film directed by Oscar Apfel and Cecil B. DeMille. It is based on the 1903 novel, The Conjuror's House; a Romance of the Free Forest by Stewart Edward White and its 1908 play adaptation The Call of the North by George Broadhurst. Robert Edeson starred in the play and reprises his role in this film. He played a dual role of both Ned Stewart and his own father, Graehme Stewart.

A copy of the film exists in the George Eastman Museum Motion Picture Collection. The film was remade by Paramount in 1921 with Jack Holt in the lead role.

== Plot ==
Graehme Stewart is accused of adultery and killed although he was innocent. His son Ned decides to avenge his father, but gets captured and sent on the long journey to death "la longue traverse". Virginia saves his life and the film's villain confesses Ned is innocent.

== Cast ==
- Robert Edeson in a dual role as Ned, and as Graehme Stewart
- Theodore Roberts as Galen Albert
- Winifred Kingston as Virginia
- Horace B. Carpenter as Rand
- Florence Dagmar as Elodie
- Milton Brown as Me-en-gan
- Vera McGarry as Julie
- Jode Mullally as Picard
- Sydney Deane as McTavish
- Fred Montague as Jack Wilson

== See also ==
- The House That Shadows Built (1931 promotional film by Paramount)
