= List of British films of 1936 =

British films released in 1936

A list of British films released in 1936.

== A–H ==
Title	Director	Cast	Genre	Notes
Accused	Thornton Freeland	Douglas Fairbanks Jr., Dolores del Río, Florence Desmond	Drama	
All In	Marcel Varnel	Ralph Lynn, Gina Malo, Garry Marsh	Comedy	
All That Glitters	Maclean Rogers	Jack Hobbs, Kay Walsh, Moira Lynd	Comedy	
The Amateur Gentleman	Thornton Freeland	Douglas Fairbanks Jr., Elissa Landi, Gordon Harker	Adventure	
The Amazing Quest of Ernest Bliss	Alfred Zeisler	Cary Grant, Mary Brian, Peter Gawthorne	Romantic comedy	
Annie Laurie	Walter Tennyson	Will Fyffe, Polly Ward, Bruce Seton	Comedy	
As You Like It	Paul Czinner	Laurence Olivier, Elisabeth Bergner, Sophie Stewart	Comedy	
The Avenging Hand	Victor Hanbury, Frank Richardson	Noah Beery, Kathleen Kelly, Louis Borel	Crime	
Ball at Savoy	Victor Hanbury	Conrad Nagel, Marta Labarr, Fred Conyngham	Musical	
The Bank Messenger Mystery	Lawrence Huntington	George Mozart, Kenneth Kove, Francesca Bahrle	Crime	
The Belles of St. Clements	Ivar Campbell	Meriel Forbes, Basil Langton, Donald Gray	Drama	
Beloved Imposter	Victor Hanbury	René Ray, Fred Conyngham, Germaine Aussey	Musical	
The Beloved Vagabond	Curtis Bernhardt	Maurice Chevalier, Margaret Lockwood, Betty Stockfeld	Musical drama	
The Big Noise	Alex Bryce	Alastair Sim, Norah Howard, Fred Duprez	Musical comedy	
Birds of a Feather	John Baxter	George Robey, Horace Hodges, Diana Beaumont	Comedy	
Blind Man's Bluff	Albert Parker	Basil Sydney, Enid Stamp-Taylor, James Mason	Drama	
Born That Way	Randall Faye	Elliott Mason, Kathleen Gibson, Terence De Marney	Comedy	
Broken Blossoms	John Brahm	Dolly Haas, Emlyn Williams, Arthur Margetson	Drama	
The Brown Wallet	Michael Powell	Patric Knowles, Nancy O'Neil, Henrietta Watson	Crime	
Busman's Holiday	Maclean Rogers	Wally Patch, Gus McNaughton, Muriel George	Comedy	
Cafe Mascot	Lawrence Huntington	Geraldine Fitzgerald, Derrick De Marney, Clifford Heatherley	Comedy	
Calling the Tune	Reginald Denham, Thorold Dickinson	Adele Dixon, Sally Gray, Sam Livesey	Musical	
Captain Bill	Ralph Cedar	Leslie Fuller, Judy Kelly, Hal Gordon	Comedy	
The Captain's Table	Percy Marmont	Percy Marmont, Daphne Courtney, Mark Daly	Crime	
The Cardinal	Sinclair Hill	Matheson Lang, Eric Portman, June Duprez	Historical	
Cheer Up	Leo Mittler	Stanley Lupino, Sally Gray, Roddy Hughes	Musical	
Chick	Michael Hankinson	Sydney Howard, Betty Ann Davies, Cecil Humphreys	Comedy crime	
Crime Over London	Alfred Zeisler	Margot Grahame, Paul Cavanagh, Basil Sydney	Crime	
The Crimes of Stephen Hawke	George King	Tod Slaughter, Marjorie Taylor, Eric Portman	Horror drama	
The Crimson Circle	Reginald Denham	Hugh Wakefield, Alfred Drayton, June Duprez	Crime	
Crown v. Stevens	Michael Powell	Patric Knowles, Beatrix Thomson, Glennis Lorimer	Crime	
David Livingstone	James A. FitzPatrick	Percy Marmont, James Carew, Pamela Stanley	Historical adventure	
Debt of Honour	Norman Walker	Leslie Banks, Will Fyffe, Geraldine Fitzgerald	Drama	
Dishonour Bright	Tom Walls	Tom Walls, Eugene Pallette, Diana Churchill	Comedy	
Dodging the Dole	John E. Blakeley	Barry K. Barnes, Dan Young	Musical	
The Dream Doctor	Widgey R. Newman	Leo Genn, Julie Suedo, Margaret Yarde	Drama	
Dreams Come True	Reginald Denham	Frances Day, Nelson Keys, Hugh Wakefield	Musical	
Dusty Ermine	Bernard Vorhaus	Anthony Bushell, Jane Baxter, Ronald Squire	Crime	
The Early Bird	Donovan Pedelty	Richard Hayward, Jimmy Mageean	Comedy	
East Meets West	Herbert Mason	George Arliss, Godfrey Tearle, Lucie Mannheim	Drama	
Educated Evans	William Beaudine	Max Miller, Hal Walters, Nancy O'Neil	Comedy	
Eliza Comes to Stay	Henry Edwards	Betty Balfour, Seymour Hicks, Ellis Jeffreys	Comedy	
The End of the Road	Alex Bryce	Harry Lauder, Bruce Seton, Campbell Gullan	Musical	
Everybody Dance	Charles Reisner	Cicely Courtneidge, Ernest Truex, Alma Taylor	Musical	
Everything in Life	J. Elder Wills	Gitta Alpar, Neil Hamilton, Lawrence Grossmith	Musical	
Everything Is Rhythm	Alfred J. Goulding	Harry Roy, Dorothy Boyd, Clarissa Selwynne	Musical	
Everything Is Thunder	Milton Rosmer	Constance Bennett, Douglass Montgomery, Oskar Homolka	Thriller	
Excuse My Glove	Redd Davis	Len Harvey, Archie Pitt, Olive Blakeney	Sports	
Fair Exchange	Ralph Ince	Patric Knowles, Roscoe Ates, Raymond Lovell	Comedy	
Faithful	Paul L. Stein	Jean Muir, Hans Söhnker, Gene Gerrard	Musical	
Fame	Leslie S. Hiscott	Sydney Howard, Miki Hood, Guy Middleton	Comedy	
Find the Lady	Roland Grillette	Jack Melford, Althea Henley, George Sanders	Comedy	
The First Offence	Herbert Mason	John Mills, Lilli Palmer, Bernard Nedell	Drama	
The Flying Doctor	Miles Mander	Charles Farrell, Mary Maguire, Margaret Vyner	Drama	Co-production with Australia
Forget Me Not	Zoltan Korda	Beniamino Gigli, Joan Gardner, Jeanne Stuart	Drama	Co-production with Germany
Full Speed Ahead	Lawrence Huntington	Moira Lynd, George Mozart, Julian Vedey	Drama	
Gaol Break	Ralph Ince	Basil Gill, Raymond Lovell, Elliott Mason	Crime	
The Gay Adventure	Sinclair Hill	Yvonne Arnaud, Barry Jones, Nora Swinburne	Comedy	
Grand Finale	Ivar Campbell	Mary Glynne, Guy Newall, Glen Alyn	Comedy	
Guilty Melody	Richard Pottier	Gitta Alpar, John Loder, Nils Asther	Drama	
Gypsy Melody	Edmond T. Gréville	Lupe Velez, Alfred Rode, Raymond Lovell	Musical comedy	
Hail and Farewell	Ralph Ince	Claude Hulbert, Bruce Lester, Wally Patch	Comedy	
Happy Days Are Here Again	Norman Lee	Renée Houston, Viola Compton, Ida Barr	Musical	
The Happy Family	Maclean Rogers	Hugh Williams, Leonora Corbett, Glennis Lorimer	Comedy	
Head Office	Melville W. Brown	Owen Nares, Nancy O'Neil, Arthur Margetson	Drama	
Hearts of Humanity	John Baxter	Bransby Williams, Wilfred Walter, Cathleen Nesbitt	Drama	
The Heirloom Mystery	Maclean Rogers	Edward Rigby, Mary Glynne, Marjorie Taylor	Crime	
Highland Fling	Manning Haynes	Charlie Naughton, Jimmy Gold, Gibson Gowland	Comedy	
His Lordship	Herbert Mason	George Arliss, Romilly Lunge, Rene Ray	Drama	
Hot News	W. P. Kellino	Lupino Lane, Phyllis Clare, Wallace Lupino	Comedy	
House Broken	Michael Hankinson	Mary Lawson, Jack Lambert, Enid Stamp Taylor	Comedy	
The House of the Spaniard	Reginald Denham	Peter Haddon, Brigitte Horney, Allan Jeayes	Thriller	
The Howard Case	Frank Richardson	Jack Livesey, Olive Sloane, David Keir	Drama	

== I–R ==
Title	Director	Cast	Genre	Notes
I Live Again	Arthur Maude	Noah Beery, Bessie Love, John Garrick	Musical	
If I Were Rich	Randall Faye	Jack Melford, Kay Walsh, Clifford Heatherley	Comedy	
The Improper Duchess	Harry Hughes	Yvonne Arnaud, Hugh Wakefield, Wilfrid Caithness	Comedy	
In the Soup	Henry Edwards	Ralph Lynn, Judy Gunn, Nelson Keys	Comedy	
The Interrupted Honeymoon	Leslie S. Hiscott	Claude Hulbert, Francis L. Sullivan, Glennis Lorimer	Comedy	
Irish and Proud of It	Donovan Pedelty	Richard Hayward, Dinah Sheridan, Gwenllian Gill	Comedy	Co-production with the Irish Free State
Irish for Luck	Arthur B. Woods	Athene Seyler, Margaret Lockwood, Patric Knowles	Comedy	
It's in the Bag	William Beaudine	Jimmy Nervo, Teddy Knox, George Carney	Comedy	
It's Love Again	Victor Saville	Jessie Matthews, Robert Young, Sonnie Hale	Musical	
It's You I Want	Ralph Ince	Seymour Hicks, Marie Lohr, Jane Carr	Comedy	
Jack of All Trades	Robert Stevenson	Jack Hulbert, Gina Malo, Robertson Hare	Comedy	
Juggernaut	Henry Edwards	Boris Karloff, Joan Wyndham, Mona Goya	Mystery	
Jury's Evidence	Ralph Ince	Hartley Power, Margaret Lockwood, Sebastian Shaw	Crime	
Keep Your Seats, Please	Monty Banks	George Formby, Florence Desmond, Alastair Sim	Comedy	
King of the Castle	Redd Davis	June Clyde, Claude Dampier, Billy Milton	Comedy	
King of Hearts	Oswald Mitchell, Walter Tennyson	Will Fyffe, Gwenllian Gill, Richard Dolman	Romance	
Laburnum Grove	Carol Reed	Edmund Gwenn, Cedric Hardwicke, Victoria Hopper	Comedy	
Land Without Music	Walter Forde	Richard Tauber, Diana Napier, June Clyde	Comedy	
The Last Journey	Bernard Vorhaus	Julien Mitchell, Hugh Williams, Judy Gunn	Thriller	
The Last Waltz	Leo Mittler	Jarmila Novotna, Harry Welchman, Gerald Barry	Musical	
Limelight	Herbert Wilcox	Anna Neagle, Arthur Tracy, Jane Winton	Musical	
The Limping Man	Walter Summers	Francis L. Sullivan, Hugh Wakefield, Patricia Hilliard	Mystery	
Living Dangerously	Herbert Brenon	Otto Kruger, Leonora Corbett, Aileen Marson	Drama	
Lonely Road	James Flood	Clive Brook, Victoria Hopper, Nora Swinburne	Drama	
Love at Sea	Adrian Brunel	Rosalyn Boulter, Carl Harbord, Aubrey Mallalieu	Comedy	
Love in Exile	Alfred L. Werker	Helen Vinson, Clive Brook, Mary Carlisle	Romance	
Love Up the Pole	Clifford Gulliver	Ernie Lotinga, Vivienne Chatterton, Wallace Lupino	Comedy	
Luck of the Turf	Randall Faye	Jack Melford, Wally Patch, Moore Marriott	Comedy	
The Man Behind the Mask	Michael Powell	Hugh Williams, Jane Baxter, George Merritt	Mystery	
The Man in the Mirror	Maurice Elvey	Edward Everett Horton, Genevieve Tobin, Alastair Sim	Comedy	
The Man Who Changed His Mind	Robert Stevenson	Boris Karloff, Anna Lee, John Loder	Horror	
Melody of My Heart	Wilfred Noy	Derek Oldham, Bruce Seton, Dorothy Vernon	Musical	
Men Are Not Gods	Walter Reisch	Miriam Hopkins, Gertrude Lawrence, Sebastian Shaw	Drama	
Men of Yesterday	John Baxter	Stewart Rome, Cecil Parker, Hay Petrie	Drama	
Midnight at Madame Tussaud's	George Pearson	James Carew, Charles Oliver, Lucille Lisle	Mystery	
The Mill on the Floss	Tim Whelan	Geraldine Fitzgerald, Frank Lawton, James Mason	Drama	
Mother, Don't Rush Me	Norman Lee	Robb Wilton, Muriel Aked, Peter Haddon	Comedy	
Murder at the Cabaret	Reginald Fogwell	James Carew, Frederick Peisley, Mark Daly	Crime	
Murder by Rope	George Pearson	Sunday Wilshin, Wilfrid Hyde-White, Daphne Courtney	Mystery	
No Escape	Norman Lee	Valerie Hobson, Leslie Perrins, Billy Milton	Mystery	
Not So Dusty	Maclean Rogers	Wally Patch, Gus McNaughton, Raymond Lovell	Comedy	
Nothing Like Publicity	Maclean Rogers	William Hartnell, Marjorie Taylor, Moira Lynd	Comedy	
On Top of the World	Redd Davis	Betty Fields, Frank Pettingell, Leslie Bradley	Comedy	
One Good Turn	Alfred J. Goulding	Leslie Fuller, Georgie Harris, Hal Gordon	Comedy	
Once in a Million	Arthur B. Woods	Charles "Buddy" Rogers, Mary Brian, Billy Milton	Comedy	
Ourselves Alone	Brian Desmond Hurst	John Loder, Antoinette Cellier, John Lodge	Drama	
Pagliacci	Karl Grune	Richard Tauber, Diana Napier, Steffi Duna	Musical	
Pay Box Adventure	W. P. Kellino	Syd Crossley, Marjorie Corbett, Molly Hamley-Clifford	Crime	
Pot Luck	Tom Walls	Ralph Lynn, Robertson Hare, Diana Churchill	Comedy	
Prison Breaker	Adrian Brunel	James Mason, Marguerite Allan, Wally Patch	Crime drama	
The Prisoner of Corbal	Karl Grune	Nils Asther, Hugh Sinclair, Hazel Terry	Historical	
Public Nuisance No. 1	Marcel Varnel	Frances Day, Arthur Riscoe, Peter Haddon	Comedy	
Queen of Hearts	Monty Banks	Gracie Fields, John Loder, Enid Stamp-Taylor	Comedy	
Radio Lover	Austin Melford	Wylie Watson, Betty Ann Davies, Jack Melford	Comedy	
Reasonable Doubt	George King	John Stuart, Nancy Burne, Marjorie Taylor	Comedy	
Rembrandt	Alexander Korda	Charles Laughton, Gertrude Lawrence, Elsa Lanchester	Biography	
Rhodes of Africa	Berthold Viertel	Walter Huston, Oskar Homolka, Basil Sydney	Historical	
Rhythm in the Air	Arthur B. Woods	Jack Donohue, Tutta Rolf, Vic Oliver	Comedy	
Royal Eagle	George A. Cooper	John Garrick, Nancy Burne, Felix Aylmer	Crime	

== S–Z ==
Title	Director	Cast	Genre	Notes
Sabotage	Alfred Hitchcock	Sylvia Sidney, Oskar Homolka, John Loder	Drama	
The Scarab Murder Case	Michael Hankinson	Wilfrid Hyde-White, Wally Patch, Kathleen Kelly	Mystery	
Second Bureau	Victor Hanbury	Marta Labarr, Charles Oliver, Arthur Wontner	Spy	
Secret Agent	Alfred Hitchcock	John Gielgud, Peter Lorre, Madeleine Carroll, Robert Young	Spy drama	
The Secret of Stamboul	Andrew Marton	Valerie Hobson, James Mason, Kay Walsh	Thriller	
The Secret Voice	George Pearson	John Stuart, Diana Beaumont, Henry Victor	Thriller	
Sensation	Brian Desmond Hurst	John Lodge, Diana Churchill, Margaret Vyner	Crime	
Seven Sinners	Albert de Courville	Edmund Lowe, Constance Cummings, Henry Oscar	Thriller	
The Shadow of Mike Emerald	Maclean Rogers	Leslie Perrins, Marjorie Mars, Atholl Fleming	Crime	
She Knew What She Wanted	Thomas Bentley	Albert Burdon, Claude Dampier, Googie Withers	Musical	
Shipmates o' Mine	Oswald Mitchell	John Garrick, Richard Hayward, Derek Blomfield	Musical	
Show Flat	Bernard Mainwaring	Clifford Heatherley, Polly Ward, Vernon Harris	Comedy	
Skylarks	Thornton Freeland	Jimmy Nervo, Teddy Knox, Nancy Burne	Comedy	
The Small Man	John Baxter	George Carney, Mary Newland, Minnie Rayner	Drama	
Soft Lights and Sweet Music	Herbert Smith	Bert Ambrose, Evelyn Dall, Harry Tate	Musical	
Someone at the Door	Herbert Brenon	Billy Milton, Aileen Marson, Noah Beery	Drama	
Song of Freedom	J. Elder Wills	Paul Robeson, Elisabeth Welch, Esme Percy	Drama	
Southern Roses	Frederic Zelnik	George Robey, Neil Hamilton, Gina Malo	Musical comedy	
Sporting Love	J. Elder Wills	Stanley Lupino, Laddie Cliff, Lu Ann Meredith	Comedy	
Spy of Napoleon	Maurice Elvey	Richard Barthelmess, Dolly Haas, Frank Vosper	Historical	
A Star Fell from Heaven	Paul Merzbach	Joseph Schmidt, Florine McKinney, Billy Milton	Comedy	
Stars on Parade	Oswald Mitchell, Challis Sanderson	Sam Barton, Arthur Lucan, Kitty McShane	Musical	
Strange Cargo	Lawrence Huntington	Kathleen Kelly, Moore Marriott, George Sanders	Crime	
Strangers on Honeymoon	Albert de Courville	Constance Cummings, Hugh Sinclair, Noah Beery	Comedy	
Such Is Life	Randall Faye	Gene Gerrard, Claude Dampier, Jean Colin	Comedy	
Sunshine Ahead	Wallace Orton	Betty Astell, Leslie Perrins, Eve Lister	Musical	
Sweeney Todd	George King	Tod Slaughter, Eve Lister, Bruce Seton	Horror	
Talk of the Devil	Carol Reed	Ricardo Cortez, Sally Eilers, Basil Sydney	Crime	
The Tenth Man	Brian Desmond Hurst	John Lodge, Antoinette Cellier, Athole Stewart	Drama	
Terror on Tiptoe	Louis Renoir	Bernard Nedell, Mabel Poulton, Stella Bonheur	Crime	
They Didn't Know	Herbert Smith	Eve Gray, Leslie Perrins, Diana Beaumont	Comedy	
Things to Come	William Cameron Menzies	Raymond Massey, Edward Chapman, Ralph Richardson	Sci-fi	
This Green Hell	Randall Faye	Edward Rigby, Sybil Grove, Richard Dolman	Comedy	
This'll Make You Whistle	Herbert Wilcox	Jack Buchanan, Elsie Randolph, Jean Gillie	Musical comedy	
Three Maxims	Herbert Wilcox	Anna Neagle, Tullio Carminati, Leslie Banks	Drama	
Ticket of Leave	Michael Hankinson	Dorothy Boyd, John Clements, George Merritt	Crime	
To Catch a Thief	Maclean Rogers	John Garrick, Mary Lawson, Vincent Holman	Comedy	
Toilers of the Sea	Selwyn Jepson	Mary Lawson, Andrews Engelmann, Cyril McLaglen	Adventure	
Tomorrow We Live	H. Manning Haynes	Godfrey Tearle, Haidee Wright, Sebastian Shaw	Drama	
A Touch of the Moon	Maclean Rogers	John Garrick, Dorothy Boyd, Joyce Bland	Comedy	
Treachery on the High Seas	Emil-Edwin Reinert	Bebe Daniels, Charles Farrell, Ben Lyon	Crime	
Tropical Trouble	Harry Hughes	Douglass Montgomery, Betty Ann Davies, Alfred Drayton	Comedy	
Troubled Waters	Albert Parker	James Mason, Virginia Cherrill, Alastair Sim	Mystery	
Tudor Rose	Robert Stevenson	Nova Pilbeam, John Mills, Cedric Hardwicke	Historical drama	
Twelve Good Men	Ralph Ince	Henry Kendall, Nancy O'Neil, Joyce Kennedy	Crime	
Twice Branded	Maclean Rogers	James Mason, Robert Rendel, Lucille Lisle	Crime	
Two on a Doorstep	Lawrence Huntington	Kay Hammond, Harold French, George Mozart	Comedy	
Two's Company	Tim Whelan	Ned Sparks, Gordon Harker, Mary Brian	Comedy	
Under Proof	Roland Gillett	Betty Stockfeld, Tyrell Davis, Guy Middleton	Comedy	
The Vandergilt Diamond Mystery	Randall Faye	Betty Astell, Bruce Seton, Charles Paton	Comedy	
Variety Parade	Oswald Mitchell	Harry Tate, Nat Gonella, Teddy Brown	Musical	
Wedding Group	Alex Bryce, Campbell Gullan	Fay Compton, Patric Knowles, Alastair Sim	Drama	
Wednesday's Luck	George Pearson	Patrick Barr, Linden Travers, Moore Marriott	Drama	
Well Done, Henry	Wilfred Noy	Will Fyffe, Cathleen Nesbitt, Marjorie Taylor	Comedy	
When Knights Were Bold	Jack Raymond	Jack Buchanan, Fay Wray, Garry Marsh	Comedy	
Where There's a Will	William Beaudine	Will Hay, Gina Malo, Graham Moffatt	Comedy	
Where's Sally?	Arthur B. Woods	Chili Bouchier, Gene Gerrard, Claude Hulbert	Comedy	
Whom the Gods Love	Basil Dean	Stephen Haggard, Victoria Hopper, John Loder	Historical	
A Wife or Two	Maclean Rogers	Henry Kendall, Nancy Burne, Betty Astell	Comedy	
Windbag the Sailor	William Beaudine	Will Hay, Moore Marriott, Graham Moffatt	Comedy	
Wings Over Africa	Ladislao Vajda	Joan Gardner, Ian Colin, James Harcourt	Adventure	
Wolf's Clothing	Andrew Marton	Claude Hulbert, Gordon Harker, Lilli Palmer	Comedy	
A Woman Alone	Eugene Frenke	Anna Sten, Henry Wilcoxon, John Garrick	Drama	
You Must Get Married	Leslie Pearce	Frances Day, Neil Hamilton, Robertson Hare	Comedy	

== Documentary ==
Title	Director	Cast	Genre	Notes
Night Mail	Harry Watt, Basil Wright	Arthur Clarke, John Grierson	Documentary short	
The Story of Papworth	Anthony Asquith	Madeleine Carroll, Gordon Harker	Short drama	

== See also ==
- 1936 in British music
- 1936 in British television
- 1936 in the United Kingdom
