= Sons of the Sea (1939 film) =

- British trade ad
- Directed by: Maurice Elvey
- Written by: George Barraud; Gerald Elliott (screenplay) (as W.G. Elliott); Maurice Elvey (screenplay); Reginald Long (dialogue); D. William Woolf (scenario)
- Produced by: K.C. Alexander
- Starring: Leslie Banks; Kay Walsh; Mackenzie Ward; Cecil Parker
- Cinematography: Eric Cross
- Edited by: Douglas Myers
- Production company: British Consolidated
- Distributed by: Grand National Pictures (UK)
- Release date: December 23, 1939
- Running time: 82 minutes
- Country: United Kingdom
- Language: English

Sons of the Sea is a 1939 British colour drama film directed by Maurice Elvey and starring Leslie Banks, Kay Walsh, Mackenzie Ward and Cecil Parker. It was written by George Barraud, Gerald Elliott (as W.G. Elliott), Elvey, Reginald Long and D. William Woolf.

== Plot ==
In Britain in 1939, the Captain of Dartmouth Naval College is murdered. His successor, Captain Hyde, believes that he himself was in fact the intended target of the assassination. He soon begins to realise that both British and foreign intelligence agents are at work. He enlists the help of his son, a reluctant sea cadet, to smoke them out.

== Cast ==
- Leslie Banks as Captain Hyde
- Kay Walsh as Alison Devar
- Mackenzie Ward as Newton Hulls
- Cecil Parker as Commander Herbert
- Simon Lack as Philip Hyde
- Ellen Pollock as Margaret Hulls
- Peter Shaw as John Strepte
- Nigel Stock as Rudd
- Kynaston Reeves as Professor Devar
- Charles Eaton as Commander-in-Chief

== Production ==
Sons of the Sea was filmed during the summer of 1939, just before the outbreak of the Second World War, something explored in the themes of the film. The film's credits state the film was "Made with full Admiralty co-operation".

It is the only feature film to be shot using the Dufaycolor process, with a limited colour palette. Since restoration, it has been shown on BBC television and Talking Pictures TV.

== Release ==
The film premiered in London on 11 March 1940, at the then recently opened Cinephone cinema at 241 Oxford Street, with the attendance of the main star, Leslie Banks.

== Reception ==
The Monthly Film Bulletin wrote: "The film is in Dufaycolour throughout with delicate pastel shades. There are many delightful shots – Dartmouth ferry, the ensign against a blue sky, red cliffs and the sea below, the cadets on parade. The story is plausible and extremely well acted. Leslie Banks gives the right air of authority as the Captain, and Simon Lack makes a youthfully human but delightful Philip. The dialogue is natural and easy, and the theme is genuinely patriotic without being embarrassingly so."

Kine Weekly wrote: "Flawless Dufaycolor photography gilds the propitious and exciting project. ... There is clever and natural character drawing – MacKenzie Ward jumps right into his own as a disarming foreign agent – to round off the healthy, inspiring and exhilarating illusion. ... Maurice Elvey, doyen of British film directors, brings all his experience and proven flair for popular showmanship to bear on his treatment of this picture."

Today's Cinema's reviewer commented that "With its topically appealing title, its surge of espionage incident, its stirring angles of filial devotion and its panoramic backgrounds of cadets on parade performing this or that manoeuvre, the development has all the essentials which make for popular success."
