= The Mystery of the Mary Celeste =

- Directed by: Denison Clift
- Screenplay by: Charles Larkworthy (Scenario)
- Story by: Denison Clift
- Produced by: Henry Passmore
- Starring: Béla Lugosi, Shirley Grey, Arthur Margetson
- Cinematography: Eric Cross; Geoffrey Faithfull
- Edited by: John Seabourne
- Production company: Hammer Film Productions
- Distributed by: General Film Distributors
- Release date: 14 November 1935; (UK) (Note: See Talk page discussion of release date.)
- Running time: 80 minutes
- Country: United Kingdom
- Language: English
- Budget: £80,000

The Mystery of the Mary Celeste (U.S. title: Phantom Ship) is a 1935 British mystery film directed by Denison Clift and starring Béla Lugosi and Shirley Grey with Arthur Margetson. It was written by Clift and Charles Larkworthy and was the second feature film from Hammer Film Productions.

It is based on the story of the Mary Celeste, a sailing ship that was found adrift and deserted in the Atlantic Ocean in 1872, and is an imagined explanation of the disappearance of the crew and passengers. It is believed that only the shortened US version survives.

== Plot ==
Captain Briggs and Captain Morehead are best friends. Morehead is in love with Sarah, and he brings Briggs to New York to meet her. However, Briggs and Sarah fall in love with one another. Both men propose to her on the same day. Sarah chooses Briggs. Sarah and Briggs reveal their marriage plans to Morehead and he gets furious with jealousy, and believes Briggs has deceived him. Briggs tells him that he will marry Sarah even if it means the end of their friendship.

As the couple plans to sail, Captain Briggs is short of crew. He asks Morehead to forgive him and help. Morehead agrees and sends a man, Volkerk Grot, not to help, but to do something to the ship. Briggs also recruits other men, including Anton Lorenzen, who is a sailor who has suffered a lot and is about to have a mental breakdown.

As the voyage begins, the crew realizes that there is a murderer among them who is killing them off one by one. Meanwhile, a crew member tries to rape Sarah; Lorenzen saves her by killing the man. But then he cries because he cannot stand the pain of killing a man.

Soon, everybody has died or disappeared except 1st mate Bilson, Lorenzen and a third crew member, Ponta Katz. They decide that one of them must be the killer.

Katz realizes that Lorenzen could not kill because he is too soft, so he runs after Bilson. Bilson shoots Katz and then celebrates with Lorenzen on becoming the new captain of the ship, and makes plans for the future.

Lorenzen gets angry and tells Bilson that he was shanghaied six years before, on the same ship, and, due to his horrific treatment aboard at that time, committed the murders to get revenge. He shoots Bilson and throws him into the sea. Just after killing Bilson, Lorenzen is hit on the head by the ship's boom. When he regains consciousness, he runs everywhere on the ship searching for Bilson, then, in his madness, jumps overboard.

The ship drifts with the wind until it is spotted by another ship. The ship is totally abandoned except for a black cat.

A final scene shows Morehead handing money to a crew member, commenting "I am thinking of Briggs and her, dead!"

== Cast ==
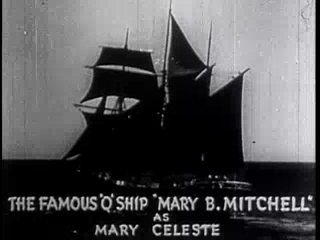
The Mary B Mitchell in the film's opening credits.

- Béla Lugosi as Anton Lorenzen / A. Gottlieb
- Shirley Grey as Sarah Briggs
- Arthur Margetson as Capt. Benjamin Briggs
- Edmund Willard as Toby Bilson
- Dennis Hoey as Tom Goodschard
- George Mozart as Tommy Duggan
- Johnnie Schofield as Peter Tooley
- Gunner Moir as Ponta Katz
- Ben Welden as 'Sailor' Hoffman
- Clifford McLaglen as Capt. Jim Morehead
- Tom Bastable as Olly Deveau
- Matt Ramage as Andy Gilling
- Terence De Marney as Charlie Kaye
- Edgar Pierce as Arian Harbens
- Herbert Cameron as Volkerk Grot
- Wilfred Essex as Horatio Sprague
- James Carew as James Winchester
- Monti DeLyle as Portunato
- Alec Fraser as Commander Mahon

== Production ==
The schooner Mary B Mitchell was used as the ship Mary Celeste. Lugosi's scenes were only finished filming in mid-August, 1935, at which time he returned to America.

== Reception ==
Kine Weekly wrote: "Neither the staging nor the story is too convincing; each savours strongly of the theatre but there nevertheless rests on the grim errirness of the play and its chilly message of foreboding, heartily delivered by the strong cast, a succession of thrillers that should not fail to excite and intrigue the not too sophisticated. ... The character of the play is such that it cannot fail entirely to impress, but it would have been much more effective dramatically had it been told with greater imagination. The retrospective treatment creates unnecessary complications, while the complete process of elimination, upon which the plot is based, soon becomes obvious at the cost of much valuable suspense."

Picture Show wrote: "Bela Lugosi is excellent as the mysterious and sinister Anton Lorenzen. Shirley Grey is good as the Captain's bride. Edmund Willard as the tough First Mate gives another clever piece of acting, 'The remainder of the players are well cast. Good entertainment."

Variety wrote: "Shirley Grey does all that is expected of her in the role of the wife. A virile, hefty bunch of men have heen chosen for the crew, with the exception of George Mozart for comedy relief. ... Outstanding role is played by Bela Lugosi as a seaman who had sailed in the boat six years previously and been thrashed until he is a mental and physical wreck. ... All the men are sufficiently forceful, with the possible exception of Arthur Margetson, as the captain of the Celeste. Ship is an American one and Margetson speaks with an accent bordering on the Oxonian. Illusion of the vessel at sea is excellent, barring the cabin scenes. Despite terrific storms, the cabin does not sway one bit. Good direction throughout, but morbid and unsatisfactory story. Very strong stuff for those who like tragic entertainment."
