= Dial 999 =

Dial 999 may refer to:

- 999 (emergency telephone number), urgent assistance contact
- Dial 999 (1938 film), British crime drama directed by Lawrence Huntington
- Dial 999 (1955 film), British crime drama written and directed by Montgomery Tully
- Dial 999 (TV series), a British crime television series starring Robert Beatty
