= Love at Sea =

Love at Sea may refer to:

- Love at Sea (1936 film), a British comedy film directed by Adrian Brunel
- Love at Sea (1964 film), a French film directed by Guy Gilles
