= Paul Neville =

Paul Neville may refer to:

- Paul Neville (politician) (1940–2019), Australian politician
- Paul Neville (musician), British industrial metal guitarist
- Paul Neville (actor) in Full Speed Ahead
