= Lieutenant Daring R.N. =

- Hugh Williams and Geraldine Fitzgerald in the film
- Directed by: Reginald Denham
- Written by: Gerald Elliott; Frank Shaw
- Produced by: Lawrence Huntington
- Starring: Hugh Williams; Geraldine Fitzgerald; Frederick Lloyd
- Cinematography: George Stretton
- Edited by: Challis Sanderson
- Music by: Horace Sheldon
- Production company: Butcher's Film Service
- Distributed by: Butcher's Film Service
- Release date: 1935
- Running time: 95 minutes
- Country: United Kingdom
- Language: English

Lieutenant Daring R.N. (also known as Lieutenant Daring, Rn) is a 1935 British comedy adventure film directed by Reginald Denham and starring Hugh Williams, Geraldine Fitzgerald and Frederick Lloyd. It was written by Gerald Elliott and Frank Shaw, and It was made by Butcher's Film Service at Cricklewood Studios. It revived a popular character of the silent era, Lieutenant Bob Daring of the Royal Navy who featured in a series of productions made by British and Colonial Films.

== Plot ==
In Chinese waters, sealed orders are stolen, and the blame falls, unfairly, on Lieutenant Bob Daring. When the woman he loves is kidnapped by a pirate gang, Daring comes to her rescue, and at the same time proves his innocence.

== Cast ==
- Hugh Williams as Lieutenant Bob Daring
- Geraldine Fitzgerald as Joan Fayre
- Frederick Lloyd as Captain Mayne
- Jerry Verno as AB Swallow
- John Rorke as Marine Fish
- Ernest Butcher as AB Singer
- Martin Walker as Neville Mayne
- Ralph Truman as Mung
- Arthur Brander as Lieutenant Barlow
- George Carr as Pung Yo
- Geoffrey Clark as Commander Brent
- Douglas Phillips as Lieutenant Commander Arnott
- Charles Cantley as Fayre, British Consul
- Robb Wilton as Pieface
- Ellen Tai as Spring Blossom
- Grace Tai as Ah Ping
- A.E.J. Walker as Roberts, butler
- Edwin Ellis as Sergeant
- Chee Foo as Chinese servant
- Pat Hagen as Yeoman of Signals
- Victor Hagen as Petty officer
- Neil McKay as hornpipe dancer
- Richard Norris as Briggs
- Hugh Selwyn as Paymaster
- K. Wing as Rickshaw Coolee
- Horace Sheldon and His Orchestra as themselves

== Reception ==
The Monthly Film Bulletin wrote: "In literature this picture would be described as 'good holiday reading'. The familiar story gets under weigh [sic] after the first ten minutes and the interest is well sustained by brisk action until the climax, at which any children's audience would cheer. Great accuracy in setting and treatment must not be looked for. ... Hugh Williams emphasises the romantic rather than the daredevil side of the hero, Geraldine Fitzgerald plays a nice girl very naturally, Ernest Bucher sings 'A-Roving' with admirable spirit and Niel McKay's acrobatic hornpipe is extremely clever."

Kine Weekly wrote: "Although the plot holds no secrets, it is treated in such a manner as to keep the interest alert. The melodramatic angle, culminating in a meaty rough and tumble, ploughs through the conventional with aggressive determination, and in riding ronghshod over improbabilities it finds many openings for romance comedy and variety, all of which are adroitly seized."
