= No Parking =

- Directed by: Jack Raymond
- Written by: Gerald Elliott
- Story by: Carol Reed
- Produced by: Herbert Wilcox
- Starring: Charles Carson; Geraldo; Fred Groves; Gordon Harker; George Hayes; Leslie Perrins
- Cinematography: Francis Carver
- Music by: Geraldo
- Production company: Herbert Wilcox Productions
- Distributed by: British Lion Film Corporation (UK) (theatrical)
- Release date: July 1938 (Britain)
- Running time: 72 min
- Country: United Kingdom
- Language: English

No Parking is a 1938 British comedy film directed by Jack Raymond. The film features Charles Carson, Geraldo, Fred Groves, Gordon Harker and Leslie Perrins in the lead roles.

The story was written by Carol Reed who later directed The Third Man.

The film is considered lost, as no prints are known to exist.

== Plot summary ==
Albert is the unfortunate car park attendant who gets caught up with jewel thieves mistaking him for the American gangster they've been waiting to join forces with. However, on the day of the heist, the real American gangster turns up, and Albert is revealed as an undercover policeman.

== Cast ==
- Charles Carson as Hardcastle
- Geraldo as Orchestra Leader
- Fred Groves as Walsh
- Gordon Harker as Albert
- George Hayes as James Selby
- Leslie Perrins as Captain Sneyd
- Cyril Smith as Stanley
- Frank Stanmore as Gus
- Irene Ware as Olga

== Critical reception ==
Picturegoer’s Lionel Collier wrote, "Gordon Harker has not appeared to such advantage for some time" and he gives "a rich, human Cockney characterization." Of the other cast members, he said, "Irene Ware is very good as a girl crook, and Leslie Perrins is excellent as a gang leader. Sound support is given by Cyril Smith, Charles Carson, Fred Graves and Frank Stanmore." His comments about the film were mostly positive and he noted, "the plot itself, while far-fetched at times, has been neatly directed by Jack Raymond … and there is a surprise denouement which, while it does not hold water very well, is amusing and unexpected."
