= Romance in Rhythm =

- Directed by: Lawrence Huntington
- Written by: Lawrence Huntington
- Produced by: Lawrence Huntington
- Starring: Phyllis Clare; David Hutcheson; David Burns
- Cinematography: Desmond Dickinson
- Edited by: Challis Sanderson
- Production company: Allied Film Productions
- Distributed by: Metro-Goldwyn-Mayer
- Release date: 1934
- Running time: 73 minutes
- Country: United Kingdom
- Language: English

Romance in Rhythm (also known as Night Club Murder) is a 1934 British mystery film directed, written and produced by Lawrence Huntington and starring Phyllis Clare, David Hutcheson and David Burns. It was made at Cricklewood Studios as a quota quickie.

== Preservation status ==
The British Film Institute National Archive holds no stills or ephemera, and no film or video materials.

== Plot ==
Chorus girl Ruth Lee and pianist Bob Mervyn are in love, but separate because of a misunderstanding. Ruth gets a job as a singer in a Berlin café, and Bob tours as a band leader. When he appears at the London café where he and Ruth first met, he is introduced to new continental singer "Sylvia Fay", but who is actually Ruth. After numerous incidents, including Bob being wrongly accused of murdering her fiancé-manager, Bob and Ruth are happily reunited.

== Cast ==
- Phyllis Clare as Ruth Lee
- David Hutcheson as Bob Mervyn
- David Burns as Mollari
- Queenie Leonard as Skye Gunderson
- Paul Tillett
- Geoffrey Goodheart
- Philip Strange as Peter Lloyd
- Julian Vedey
- Carroll Gibbons as himself with his Savoy Orpheans

== Reception ==
Kine Weekly wrote: "The story follows familiar, hackneyed paths, always seeking the sensational, but never finding it, and the acting, with few exceptions, is amateurish. Musical divertissement is presented on a very meagre scale, and the song numbers are feeble. The picture, in fact, is poor in every department and utterly devoid of dramatic unity."

The Daily Film Renter wrote: "Played against hotel backgrounds, film has two light romantic numbers effectively sung by star. The direction seems adequate, but the portrayals lack spirit. Light quota fare for unexacting patrons."

Picturegoer wrote: "Crude depiction of life behind the scenes of London's cabarets. Plot is of no account, acting is weak, and the song number unremarkable."
