= Jubilee Window =

- Ralph Truman and Michael Shepley in the film.
- Directed by: George Pearson
- Written by: Gerald Elliott; George Pearson
- Produced by: Anthony Havelock-Allan
- Starring: Sebastian Shaw; Ralph Truman; Olive Melville
- Production company: British and Dominions
- Distributed by: Paramount British Pictures
- Release date: 21 June 1935
- Running time: 61 minutes
- Country: United Kingdom
- Language: English

Jubilee Window is a 1935 British comedy film directed by George Pearson and starring Sebastian Shaw, Ralph Truman and Olive Melville. It was written by Gerald Elliott and Pearson, and was made as a quota quickie.

== Preservation status ==
The British Film Institute National Archive holds a collection of ephemera and stills but no film or video materials.

== Plot ==
Sir Edward Musgrove hides the family jewels to provent his spendthrift wife from pawning them. When he dies, the jewels cannot be found. Dacres, a crook, inveigles his way into the life of Mrs Holroyd, the wife of Musgrove's solicitor, pretending to admire her daughter. He goes with the Holroyds and their daughter to Musgrove's house, which overlooks the procession for the Silver Jubilee of George V, hoping to discover the jewels. Farcial situations ensue.

== Cast ==
- Sebastian Shaw as Peter Ward
- Ralph Truman as Dan Stevens
- Olive Melville as Margery Holroyd
- Frank Birch as Ambrose Holroyd
- Margaret Yarde as Mrs. Holroyd
- Michael Shepley as Dacres
- Winifred Oughton as Mrs Tribbets
- Robert Horton as Sir Edward Musgrove
- Dorothy Hammond as Lady Musgrove
- Mark Daly as Dave
- Walter Amner
- Frank Bertram
- Doris Hare

== Reception ==
Kine Weekly wrote: "It is conventional rather old-fashioned stuff put over without much polish and suitable only for quota purposes. ... Margaret Varde gives a good performance as a masterful woman, and Frank Birch is sound as her hen-pecked husband. The rest of the cast is fair. The production is hardly up to the standard one expects from George Pearson. The time honored situations are handled in an obvious manner, and generally the fun is so ingenuous and artless that the picture, as a whole, fails to grip."

The Daily Film Renter wrote: "Honours go to Margaret Yarde and Frank Birch, although all players competent. Useful supporting feature. This entertaining little comedy has been given a topical flavor by inclusion of scenes of Jubilee crowds and procession."
