= The Fatal Hour (1937 film) =

- Moira Reed and Moore Marriott in the film
- Directed by: George Pearson
- Written by: Cicely Frazer-Simpson (novel); Ralph Neale; Gerald Elliott
- Produced by: Anthony Havelock-Allan
- Starring: Edward Rigby; Moira Reed; Moore Marriott
- Production company: British and Dominions
- Distributed by: Paramount British Pictures
- Release date: May 1937
- Running time: 66 minutes
- Country: United Kingdom
- Language: English

The Fatal Hour (also known as The Clock) is a 1937 British drama film directed by George Pearson and starring Edward Rigby, Moira Reed and Moore Marriott. It was written by Ralph Neale and Gerald Elliott based on the novel by Cicely Frazer-Simpson.

It was the final film of the director George Pearson, who had been a leading figure during the silent era, and was made as a quota quickie at Pinewood Studios.

== Preservation status ==
The British Film Institute National Archive holds a collection of ephemera but no film or video materials.

== Plot ==
Cready is the leader of a gang of spies, and, posing as an antiques dealer, arranges to deliver an explosives-fliied clock to the chemist Sir George Bell, inventor of a formula to prevent against gas attacks. The clock is primed to detonate when Sir George is in a meeting with the country's defence chiefs. However, Sir George's secretary Mary, having been warned by her father – a member of Cready's spy gang – removes the clock before the meeting, and it later explodes killing the conspirators, including Cready.

== Cast ==
- Edward Rigby as Cready
- Moira Reed as Mary Denston
- Moore Marriott as Dixon
- Dick Hunter as Peter
- Derek Gorst as James West
- D.J. Williams as evangelist
- J.R. Lockwood as Sir George Bell
- Ernest Sefton as Pat
- Cyril Hillier
- Douglas Vine

== Reception ==
Kine Weekly wrote: "Popular espionage drama, combining story ingenuity with vivid character drawing, graphic detail and convincing atmosphere. The entertainment is successful in its quest for the unexpected, yet makes ample provision for comedy and romance. There is no dawdling; the development is keen and direct."

The Daily Film Renter wrote: "The plot suffers somewhat from being over-involved, but after a leisurely start, action is plentiful, and the atmosphere of suspense well sustained, the principal flaw in the picture being stilted dialogue, which approximates to melodrama rather, than life."

Picture Show wrote: "Edward Rigby is one of the most outstanding British character actors, and in this film he carries off acting honours with ease for his natural, convincing portrayal. ... The story is not entirely convincing, supporting cast fair, settings good."
