= Mackenzie Ward =

British actor (1903–1976)

- Ward in 1938
- Born: 20 February 1903; Eastbourne, Sussex, England, United Kingdom
- Died: January 1976 (aged 72); Brighton, Sussex, England, United Kingdom
- Other name: Rupert John Mackenzie Ward
- Occupations: Film actor Stage actor

Mackenzie Ward (20 February 1903 – January 1976) was a British stage and film actor.

== Filmography ==
Year	Title	Role	Notes
1929	Syncopation	Sylvester Cunningham	
1929	Lucky in Love	Cyril	
1930	The Lady of Scandal	Ernest	
1930	Sunny	Wendell-Wendell	
1933	The Golden Cage	Claude Barrington	
1935	The Student's Romance	Karl Reuter	
1935	While Parents Sleep	Jerry Hammond	
1936	As You Like It	Touchstone	
1937	The Girl in the Taxi	Hubert des Aubrais	
1939	Over the Moon	Guy	
1939	Sons of the Sea	Newton Hulls	
1941	Kipps	Pearce	
1941	Turned Out Nice Again	Gerald Dawson	
1945	The World Owes Me a Living	Tommy Tindsley	Uncredited
1945	Caesar and Cleopatra	Councillor	Uncredited
1946	Carnival	Arthur Danby	
1948	The Dark Road		
1948	The Monkey's Paw	Noel Lang	
1949	Dark Secret	Artist	
1949	A Run for Your Money	The Photographer	
1950	The Happiest Days of Your Life	Benson	Uncredited
1950	Something in the City	Chelsea Artist	
1951	Laughter in Paradise	Benson	
1951	Madame Louise	Business Man	
1960	The Two Faces of Dr. Jekyll	Business Man	Uncredited, (final film role)

== Bibliography ==
- Low, Rachael. History of the British Film: Filmmaking in 1930s Britain. George Allen & Unwin, 1985 .
