= Big Business (1930 film) =

1930 British film by Oscar M. Sheridan

- Directed by: Oscar M. Sheridan
- Written by: Hubert W. David; Oscar M. Sheridan
- Produced by: Oscar M. Sheridan
- Starring: Frances Day; Barrie Oliver; Virginia Vaughan; Anthony Ireland
- Cinematography: Basil Emmott
- Music by: Oscar M. Sheridan; H.W. David
- Production company: Oscar M. Sheridan Productions
- Distributed by: Fox Film Company
- Release date: 30 September 1930
- Running time: 76 minutes
- Country: United Kingdom
- Language: English

Big Business is a 1930 British musical film directed by Oscar M. Sheridan and starring Frances Day, Barrie Oliver and Virginia Vaughan. It was made at the Twickenham Film Studios in London.

== Cast ==
- Frances Day as Pamela Fenchurch
- Barrie Oliver as Barnie
- Virginia Vaughan as Kay
- Anthony Ireland as Jimmy
- Ben Welden as Fenchurch
- Jimmy Godden as Oppenheimer
- Billy Fry as Augustus
- Lewis Keezing as Miggs
- Leslie 'Hutch' Hutchinson as Pianist
- Arthur Roseberry as himself - Orchestra Leader

== Bibliography ==
- Low, Rachael. Filmmaking in 1930s Britain. George Allen & Unwin, 1985.
- Wood, Linda. British Films, 1927–1939. British Film Institute, 1986.
