= Twin Faces =

- Directed by: Lawrence Huntington
- Written by: Gerald Elliott; Douglas Reekie
- Produced by: J. Steven Edwards
- Starring: Anthony Ireland; Francesca Bahrle; Frank Birch; Paul Neville
- Production company: Premier Sound Films
- Distributed by: Paramount British Pictures
- Release date: August 1937
- Running time: 67 minutes
- Country: United Kingdom
- Language: English

Twin Faces (also known as Press Button B) is a 1937 British crime film directed by Lawrence Huntington and starring Anthony Ireland, Francesca Bahrle and Frank Birch. It was written by Gerald Elliott and Douglas Reekie, and made at Highbury Studios as a quota quickie for release by Paramount Pictures.

== Preservation status ==
The British Film Institute National Archive holds a collection of ephemera and stills but no film or video materials.

== Plot ==
Jimmy the Climber is planning to steal a unique tiara. At the jewellery's auction, he spots his double – a man named Michael Wentworth. When he does the burglary he is seen, and the next day his description is circulated. He hatches a plan to frame Wentworth.

== Cast ==
- Anthony Ireland as Jimmy the Climber / Michael Wentworth
- Francesca Bahrle as Judy Strangeways
- Frank Birch as Ben Zwigi
- Paul Neville as Cmdr. Strangeways
- Victor Hagen as Inspector Coates
- George Turner as Maurice
- Ivan Wilmot as Levenstein
- Frank Tickle as John Cedar

== Reception ==
The Monthly Film Bulletin wrote: "The direction is fairly good, but occasionally amateurish. Anthony Ireland in the double part is good, giving some difference to the characterisations. An excellent performance is given by Frank Birch as Ben Zwegi, the receiver of Jimmy's stolen goods. Francesca Bahrle's portrayal of Judy is poor; her acting is camera-conscious, given to histrionic pauses and her intonations forced. The photography is adequate except when Anthony Ireland meets himself, when the fake is painfully obvious."

The Daily Film Renter wrote: "Plot never manages to convince, but development affords certain quota of melodramatics, while genuine London landmarks figure prominently in location set-up. ... This story cannot, of course, be taken seriously for a single moment, but there are, nevertheless, moments of suspense, more due to competent direction than narrative values."
