= Kicking the Moon Around =

1938 British film by Walter Forde

- Florence Desmond, Edward Rigby, Julian Vedey and George Carney in the film.
- Directed by: Walter Forde
- Written by: Angus MacPhail; Roland Pertwee; Michael Hogan; H. Fowler Mear
- Based on: story by Thomas J. Geraghty
- Produced by: Herbert Wynne
- Cinematography: Francis Carver
- Edited by: Derek N. Twist
- Production company: Vogue Film Productions
- Release date: 30 March 1938
- Running time: 78 minutes
- Country: United Kingdom
- Language: English

Kicking the Moon Around (also known as Millionaire Merry-go-round and The Playboy) is a 1938 British musical comedy film directed by Walter Forde and starring Bert Ambrose, Evelyn Dall and Harry Richman. It was written by Angus MacPhail, Roland Pertwee, Michael Hogan and H. Fowler Mear from a story by Thomas J. Geraghty. It was re-issued in 1943."

The film marked Maureen O'Hara's screen debut; she appeared very briefly, speaking one line.

== Preservation status ==
The British Film Institute National Archive holds a collection of ephemera and stills but no film or video materials.

== Plot summary ==
Millionaire Bobbie Hawkes is engaged to Flo, a singer and aspiring actress who hopes to move to Hollywood. He becomes concerned when his friend Mark points out that Flo seems mostly interested in Bobbie's money. In an effort to discover whether she is a gold digger, Bobbie pretends to have lost his fortune on the stock market and she ends their engagement.

Disguised as an ordinary laborer, he befriends a shopgirl named Pepper who performs for customers. He is impressed by Pepper's voice and decides to help her start a singing career. A jealous Flo sabotages Pepper's audition with popular bandleader Bert Ambrose and tricks her into signing a contract with the store owner, Mr. Stoker. However, Bobbie outsmarts Flo by arranging a second audition for Pepper. Undeterred, Flo ruins Pepper's debut performance by painting Bobbie as a villain and plying her with alcohol; in the ensuing chaos, everyone in the club is arrested and brought before a magistrate. The magistrate sentences Flo to seven days in jail for assaulting Mark, ruining her chance of a Hollywood contract. Meanwhile, Pepper and Bobbie are free to go and start their life together.

== Cast ==
- Bert Ambrose and his orchestra as themselves
- Evelyn Dall as Pepper Martin
- Harry Richman as Harry
- Florence Desmond as Flo Hadley
- Hal Thompson as Bobbie Hawkes
- C. Denier Warren as Mark Browd
- Leslie Carew as Streamline
- Julian Vedey as Herbert Stoker
- Max Bacon as Gus
- Davy Burnaby as magistrate
- George Carney as Constable Truscott
- Edward Rigby as Professor Scattlebury
- Maureen O'Hara as secretary

== Production ==
The film was shot in Pinewood Studios and distributed by General Film Distributors.

== Release ==
In 1942, the film was rereleased in theatres with the new title of Millionaire Merry-Go-Round. It was titled The Play Boy in the US.

== Reception ==
The Monthly Film Bulletin wrote: "The story is nebulous, and what there is of it is unconvincing, but there are many compensations. There is Ambrose who with his orchestra puts over some tuneful numbers; Florence Desmond does brilliant impersonations of Greta Garbo and Katherine Hepburn; Evelyn Dall makes an attractive heroine and croons effectively; and Hal Thompson makes a pleasant enough hero. Julian Videy as an excitable chain-store manager and Edward Rigby as a Hyde Park orator give two clever little studies. The director keeps things moving at a brisk pace. On the whole this is a bright and entertaining film."

Kine Weekly wrote: "PolishedBritish romantic comedy musicale, featuring box-office recruits from radio and cabaret. The plot plays up to the stars, and they in turn scintillate in a thrilling atmosphere of dazzling versatility. The technical presentation is excellent. ... Hal Thompson is wooden as Bobby, but Evelyn Dall, the famous blues singer, levels the love interest up as Pepper. Her performance is good. Florence Desmond indulges in clever mimicry and draws convincing character as the spiteful Flo, Edward Rigby is excellent as Scattle-bury, and Julian Vedey and Denier Warren score in major supporting roles."

Variety wrote: "Musical compares favorably with American song and dance shows, and, while not competing with the vocal and instrumental American films in the matter of production, is more than adequate in that respect. It far exceeds many American rivals in the matter of entertainment. One thing, and one thing alone, is responsible. It is the first instance within memory that a British musical enjoyed the advantage of 'going to press' with a suitably prepared script."
