= Lieutenant Daring =

Lieutenant Daring was the name of a series of silent films made by British and Colonial Films featuring a fictional British Royal Navy lieutenant of that name. The films were made at Newstead House in Strawberry Vale, East Finchley, London, and on location.

The character was revived for the 1935 talkie Lieutenant Daring R.N.

== Selected productions ==
- The Adventures of Lieutenant Daring R.N.: In a South American Port (1911)
- Lieutenant Daring Avenges an Insult to the Union Jack (1912)
- Lieutenant Daring Defeats the Middleweight Champion (1912)
- Lieutenant Daring and the Photographing Pigeon (1912)
- Lieutenant Daring and the Ship's Mascot (1912)
- Lieutenant Daring Quells a Rebellion (1912)
- Lieutenant Daring and the Plans of the Mine Fields (1912) (alternative title: Lieutenant Daring Captures a Spy)
- Lieutenant Daring and the Labour Riots (1913)
- Lieutenant Daring RN and the Water Rats (1924)
