= Frank Birch =

English cryptographer and actor (1889–1956)

Francis Lyall Birch
- Born: 5 December 1889; London, England
- Died: 14 February 1956 (aged 66); London, England
- Other name: Frank Birch
- Occupations: Cryptographer and actor
- Spouse: Vera Benedicta Gage

Francis Lyall "Frank" Birch, CMG OBE (5 December 1889 – 14 February 1956) was a British cryptographer and actor. He worked at Bletchley Park from 1939 to 1945 during World War II. He headed the German navy sub-section first and later the navy section. He and his staff analyzed and distributed to the Royal Navy the decoded messages of the navies of the Axis powers, especially the Kriegsmarine of Nazi Germany. The secretive work of Birch and many others at Bletchley Park helped the British overcome the most dangerous threat to their survival in 1941 and 1942, the War in the Atlantic.

== Early life ==
Frank Birch was born in London on 5 December 1889, the third son of John Arden Birch, a banker, and Charlotte Stopford Birth. He as educated at Eton College and King's College, Cambridge. He studied history and modern languages and graduated in 1912 with honors in both subjects. During World War I he initially served in the Royal Naval Volunteer Reserve as a lieutenant and took part in the Dardanelles campaign as an interpreter. Fluent in German, in 1916 the Admiralty assigned him to decrypt and interpret German naval communications. He worked in Room 40, the Admiralty's cryptanalysis section. After the war, Birch was a fellow at Cambridge from 1916 to 1934 and a lecturer at Cambridge from 1921 to 1928. Afterwards he became an actor, a theater producer, and an advisor to the Government Code and Cypher School. Birch appeared in many plays and movies in the late 1920s and 1930s. He was especially noted for his portrayal of Widow Twankey.

Author Michael Smith described Birch as "a short bald man." Novelist Penelope Fitzgerald described him as "a many-sided human being -- a rather dull historian, an acceptable drinking companion, a mysterious private personality, a brilliant talker, and a born actor." Birch was eccentric and abrasive, but popular with his staff and bridged a gap between the older codebreakers and the younger.

== Bletchley Park ==
Birch offered his services to the government shortly after the beginning of the war in September 1939 and arrived at Bletchley Park on 5 September 1939. William "Nobby" Clarke hired him as head of the German Naval sub-section. The section then consisted of four people, including Phoebe Senyard. Birch embarked on the rapid expansion of the sub-section (as all of Bletchey Park was expanding). In August 1941, he replaced Clarke as head of the Naval Section which would grow to have 900 employees by 1945. The Naval Section was housed in Hut 4, one of the temporary building erected on the grounds of the Bletchley Park mansion. Harry Hinsley became the head of the German sub-section.

The greatest threat to Britain's survival from mid 1940 to mid-1942 was the German submarine attacks on merchant ships carrying food and essential materials from the Americas to Britain. Bletchley Park's Birch's top priority was to break the German naval codes which had not been accomplished during the past 20 years. Ninety-five percent of German naval traffic was encoded using the Enigma machine. Hut 8 housed the codebreakers, of whom Alan Turing and Peter Twinn are the best known. Birch's Hut 4, had the task of the translation and intelligence analysis of the decrypted messages. Hut 4 would then pass its analysis of the decrypted messages to the Royal Navy. Progress in decrypting German navy messages was slow but the results were eventually impressive. The decrypted messages permitted the Royal Navy to reroute convoys of merchant ships away from the location of German submarines. From March to June 1941, the Germans sank 282,000 tons of merchant ships; from July to December 1941, British shipping losses were only 120,000 tons.

Birch and Hut 4 assisted Turing and Twinn with "cribs" they discovered, but Birch was not complimentary about their efforts: "Turing and Twinn are brilliant..but not practical." Birch agitated for more resources and closer cooperation with the United States Navy. This led to a visit by Birch and Edward Travis to the United States in September 1942. The pair concluded an agreement for cooperation in codebreaking between Bletchley Park and the U.S.

"Birch excelled less in codebreaking than in collating and explaining the results."

== Later life ==
After the war Frank Birch was the official historian of the Government Communications Headquarters (GCHQ). He wrote a three-volume history of Bletchey Park titled A History of British SIGINT, 1941-1945. Most of his history was not published for decades due to official secrecy regarding Bletchley Park. He died on 14 February 1956 in London.

== Selected filmography ==
- School for Stars (1935) - Robert Blake
- Jubilee Window (1935) - Ambrose Holroyd
- Cross Currents (1935) - Rev. Eustace Hickling
- Wolf's Clothing (1936) - Reverend John Laming
- Love at Sea (1936) - Mr. Godwin
- Such Is Life (1936) - Mockett
- Jump for Glory (1937) - Vicar
- Double Exposures (1937) - Kempton
- Twin Faces (1937) - Ben Zwigi
- Victoria the Great (1937) - Sir Charles Dilke
- Jennifer Hale (1937) - Sharman
- The Academy Decides (1937)
- Who Goes Next? (1938) - Capt. Grover
- The Challenge (1938) - Rev. Charles Hudson
- The Villiers Diamond (1938) - Silas Wade
- Lady in the Fog (1952) - Boswell - the airport manager
- Will Any Gentleman...? (1953) - Mr. Brown
- Face the Music (1954) - Trumpet Salesman

== Sources ==
- Ralph Erskine, Birch, Francis Lyall (1889–1956), Oxford Dictionary of National Biography, Oxford University Press, 2004.
- Action this Day edited by Michael Smith & Ralph Erskine (2001, Bantam London); ISBN 0-593-04910-1
