= Anthony Ireland (actor) =

British actor (1902–1957)

- 1939 Spotlight photo
- Born: 4 February 1902; Arequipa, Peru
- Died: 4 December 1957 (aged 55); London, England
- Occupation: Actor
- Years active: 1925-1957

Anthony Ireland (4 February 1902 – 4 December 1957) was a British actor. He was born in Peru to British parents but by 1904 his family lived in Chile, where his brother Noel was born. In 1910 they moved to England and in the 1911 census they were shown as living in Bedford. Noel became an RAF pilot and was killed in a crash in 1931.

Ireland made his stage debut in 1925, and appeared in the original London production of Patrick Hamilton's Rope, in 1929. He was active in both British and U.S. theatre, and in various films and TV shows over the years.

== Selected filmography ==
- Big Business (1930)
- Spanish Eyes (1930)
- The Water Gipsies (1932)
- Called Back (1933)
- Three Maxims (1936)
- Jump for Glory (1937)
- Twin Faces (1937)
- Sweet Devil (1937)
- Just like a Woman (1939)
- Mrs. Pym of Scotland Yard (1940)
- The Prime Minister (1941)
- The Gambler and the Lady (1952)
- Spaceways (1953)
- Night of the Silvery Moon (1954)
- I Accuse! (1958)
