= Missing, Believed Married =

- Directed by: John Paddy Carstairs
- Screenplay by: A. R. Rawlinson (& original story)
- Produced by: Anthony Havelock-Allan
- Starring: Wally Patch; Julian Vedey; Hazel Terry
- Cinematography: Francis Carver
- Edited by: Lister Laurance
- Production company: British and Dominions
- Distributed by: Paramount British Pictures (UK)
- Release date: 24 September 1937 (London)
- Running time: 66 minutes
- Country: United Kingdom
- Language: English

Missing, Believed Married is a 1937 British comedy film directed by John Paddy Carstairs and starring Wally Patch, Julian Vedey and Hazel Terry. It was a quota quickie made at Pinewood Studios. A young heiress is almost tricked into marriage by a fortune hunter.

The film's sets were designed by Wilfred Arnold.

== Plot ==
When young Heiress Hermione Blakiston discovers that the count she was engaged to is a fortune-hunting imposter, she runs away. Concussion to the head during a street brawl leaves Hermione with amnesia, but she is rescued and taken in by street vendors Flatiron and Mario. When the count appears on the scene once more and tricks Hermione into going to Paris with him, her new friends follow and rescue her again.

== Cast ==
- Wally Patch as Flatiron Stubbs
- Julian Vedey as Mario Moroni
- Hazel Terry as Hermione Blakiston
- Emilio Cargher as Emilio Graffia
- Peter Coke as Peter
- Margaret Rutherford as Lady Parke
- Charles Paton as Mr. Horton
- Irene Handl as Chambermaid

== Bibliography ==
- Low, Rachael. Filmmaking in 1930s Britain. George Allen & Unwin, 1985.
- Wood, Linda. British Films, 1927-1939. British Film Institute, 1986.
