= Lend Me Your Wife =

1935 film

- Directed by: W. P. Kellino
- Written by: Edmund D'Alby; Fred Duprez; W.P. Kellino
- Produced by: Fred Browett
- Starring: Henry Kendall; Kathleen Kelly; Cyril Smith
- Production companies: Grafton Films; Veneficus Films
- Distributed by: Metro-Goldwyn-Mayer
- Release date: October 1935
- Running time: 61 minutes
- Country: United Kingdom
- Language: English

Lend Me Your Wife is a 1935 British comedy film directed by W. P. Kellino and starring Henry Kendall, Kathleen Kelly and Cyril Smith. It was written by Edmund D'Alby, Fred Duprez and Kellino, and made at Elstree Studios as a quota quickie.

== Preservation status ==
The British Film Institute National Archive holds no stills or ephemera, and no film or video materials.

== Plot ==
To get his allowance doubled, Tommy Radford pretends to his rich uncle Jerry that he is married. When the uncle visits, uncle arrives, Tommy persuades his best pal's wife Grace to fill in for his non-existent wife. Farcial complications follow.

== Cast ==
- Henry Kendall as Tommy Radford
- Kathleen Kelly as Grace Harwood
- Cyril Smith as Charles Harwood
- Jimmy Godden as Uncle Jerry
- Marie Ault as Aunt Jane
- Hal Gordon as Nick Larkin
- Gillian Maude as Ruth
- Hilda Campbell-Russell as Martha Larkin

== Reception ==
The Daily Film Renter wrote: "Cast in familiar mould, with rather feeble humour and easily foreseen developments. Subject's main entertainment bid arises from smooth portrayal of Henry Kendall as harassed leading man. ... Henry Kendall, who plays Tommy, works hard, and, although he has banal material at his command, manages to give an entertaining performance. It says much for his smooth acting that he gives some semblance of credibility to the piece."
