= The Blue Bird (1910 film) =

1910 British silent film

- Written by: Maurice Maeterlinck (play)
- Starring: Pauline Gilmer; Olive Walter
- Release date: 1910
- Running time: 420 meters (about 14 minutes)
- Country: United Kingdom
- Languages: Silent film English intertitles

The Blue Bird is a 1910 silent film, based on the 1908 play by Maurice Maeterlinck and starring Pauline Gilmer as Mytyl and Olive Walter as Tytyl. It was filmed in England.

== Cast (in credits order) ==
- Pauline Gilmer as Mytyl
- Olive Walter as Tytyl
- Margaret Murray as Mummy Tyl
- E.A. Warburton as Daddy Tyl
- Ernest Hendrie as Tylo
- Norma Page as Tylette
- Carlotta Addison as The Fairy
- Edward Rigby as Bread
- H.R. Hignett as Sugar
- Doris Lytton as Milk
- Saba Raleigh as Cow
- C. V. France as Time
- Roy Travers as Cow
