= Cross Currents (1935 film) =

1935 British film by Adrian Brunel

- Opening tiles
- Directed by: Adrian Brunel
- Written by: Gerald Elliott (novel); Leigh Aman; Adrian Brunel
- Produced by: Anthony Havelock-Allan
- Starring: Ian Colin; Marjorie Hume; Evelyn Foster; Frank Birch
- Cinematography: Francis Carver
- Production company: British & Dominions Film Corporation
- Distributed by: Paramount British Pictures
- Release date: July 1935
- Running time: 68 minutes
- Country: United Kingdom
- Language: English

Cross Currents (also known as Nine Days Blunder) is a 1935 British comedy film directed by Adrian Brunel and starring Ian Colin, Marjorie Hume and Evelyn Foster. It was written by Pelham Leigh-Aman and Adrian Brunel, based on the novel Nine Days Blunder by Gerald Elliott. The film was made as a quota quickie supporting feature, for distribution by Paramount to allow them to meet the annual quota established by the British government. Much of the film was shot on location in Cornwall.

== Preservation status ==
The British Film Institute National Archive holds a collection of ephemera and stills but no film or video materials.

== Plot ==
Three residents of a Devon village, the Reverend Eustace Hickling, Major Murdock and Commander Mannering, are rival suitors for the widowed Mrs. Stepping Drayton. When Murdock disappears, Hickling and Mannering are suspected of murder. Then they, too, vanish. When all parties turn up again, Murdock reveals that he staged his disappearance in order to unmask an unscrupulous share dealer.

== Cast ==
- Ian Colin as Tony Brocklehurst
- Marjorie Hume as Mrs. Stepping-Drayton
- Evelyn Foster as Margery Weston
- Frank Birch as Rev. Eustace Hickling
- Aubrey Pollock as Major Murdock
- Aubrey Mallalieu as General Trumpington
- Kate Saxon as Miss Cruickshank
- Aubrey Dexter as Colonel Bagge-Grant
- Bryan Powley as Commander Mannering
- Sally Gray as Sally Croker

== Reception ==
The Monthly Film Bulletin wrote: "The film is often slow as it is constantly held up for the sake of a witticism or a whole series of them. ... The acting of Ian Colin and Marjorie Hume is good, while that of the vicar is excellent, as is also that of the leader of the Girl Guides ... There are many laughable moments and on the whole it is good entertainment."

The Daily Film Renter wrote: "Poor direction, banal dialogue, artificial characterisation and lashings of alleged comedy relief combine to put this film into class for extremely indulgent patrons."

Kine Weekly wrote: "This British comedy, which flirts timidly with crime, is a painfully childish affair. Much ado about nothing expressed verbally, it has nothing to recommend it other than its quota ticket."

Picturegoer wrote: "Very ingenuous comedy, which is outmoded in every department and overloaded with dialogue. The artistes have little chance with the material at their command, and the picture, as a whole represents very indifferent entertainment."

Picture Show wrote: "Frank Birch as the Rev. Hickling gives an amusing performance, and the roles of General Trumpington and Colonel Bagge-Grant are played quite well by Aubrey Mallalien and Aubrey Dexter respectively. Kate Saxon is convincing as Miss Cruikshank. The rest of the players are quite good."
