= Gerald Elliott =

British screenwriter (1907–1982)

- Born: July 1907; Lewisham, England United Kingdom
- Died: 1982; South Glamorgan, Wales, United Kingdom
- Occupation: Writer
- Years active: 1935-1942 (film)

Gerald Elliott (1907–1982) was a British screenwriter.

== Filmography ==
- Lieutenant Daring R.N. (1935)
- Jubilee Window (1935)
- Cross Currents (1935)
- A Star Fell from Heaven (1936)
- Birds of a Feather (1936)
- Pay Box Adventure (1936)
- Strange Cargo (1936)
- Men of Yesterday (1936)
- Hearts of Humanity (1936)
- Cafe Mascot (1936)
- Two on a Doorstep (1936)
- Full Speed Ahead (1936)
- Double Exposures (1937)
- Museum Mystery (1937)
- Our Fighting Navy (1937)
- The Frog (1937)
- Twin Faces (1937)
- Holiday's End (1937)
- The Song of the Road (1937)
- The Fatal Hour (1937)
- Dial 999 (1938)
- Silver Top (1938)
- Return of the Frog (1938)
- No Parking (1938)
- Inspector Hornleigh (1938)
- Blondes for Danger (1938)
- Sword of Honour (1939)
- Sons of the Sea (1939)
- All at Sea (1940)
- The Great Mr. Handel (1942)
