= Jump for Glory =

- Italian poster
- Directed by: Raoul Walsh
- Written by: Gordon McDonnell (novel); John Meehan Jr. Harold French
- Produced by: Douglas Fairbanks Jr. Marcel Hellman
- Starring: Douglas Fairbanks Jr. Valerie Hobson; Alan Hale; Jack Melford
- Cinematography: Victor Arménise
- Edited by: Conrad von Molo
- Music by: Percival Mackey
- Production company: Criterion Films
- Distributed by: United Artists
- Release date: 5 March 1937
- Running time: 85 minutes
- Country: United Kingdom
- Language: English

Jump for Glory (also known as When Thief Meets Thief) is a 1937 British crime romantic drama film directed by Raoul Walsh and starring Douglas Fairbanks Jr., Valerie Hobson and Alan Hale. It was written by John Meehan Jr. and Harold French based on the 1936 novel by Gordon McDonnell. The film was shot at Isleworth Studios by the independent company Criterion Film for distribution by United Artists. The film's sets were designed by the art director Edward Carrick.

== Plot ==
Rick Morgan, an American involved in the bootlegging trade, is forced to relocate to Britain where he becomes one of the top cat burglars in London. One night while breaking into a house he runs into the daughter of its occupant Glory Fane and they soon fall in love. However, one of Morgan's old associates from the United States, now masquerading as a respectable member of British society, threatens to wreck his chances of going straight and finding happiness with Glory.

== Cast ==
Per opening credits and British Film Catalogue

- Douglas Fairbanks Jr. as Ricky Morgan
- Valerie Hobson as Glory Howard / Glory Fane
- Alan Hale as Jim Dial / Colonel Fane
- Edward Rigby as Sander
- Barbara Everest as Mrs. Nolan
- Jack Melford as Thompson
- Anthony Ireland as Sir Timothy Haddon
- Esmé Percy as Robinson
- Basil Radford as Valentine
- Leo Genn as Peters
- Ian Fleming as coroner
- Frank Birch as vicar
- Roland Culver as conductor
- Fred Duprez
- Henry Longhurst
- Win Oughton
- Cecil Bevan as butler
- Joan Connor
- Mary Kerridge
- Jim Burnett
- Hindle Edgar
- Herbert Cameron
- Dorothy Oldfield
- George Mozart

== Reception ==
The Monthly Film Bulletin wrote: "The story naturally relies rather on vigorous action (of which there is plenty) than on probabilities of character or of circumstance. Douglas Fairbanks Jr and Valerie Hobson play the joint juvenile lead in a pleasant – fashion, although (perhaps wisely) they do not attempt any great depth of characterisation in the more emotional scenes. Alan Hale is well cast and gives a good performance as a 'fence' with whom Ricky has many dealings. The settings are thoroughly businesslike and appropriate, and the photography and lighting are competent."

Kine Weekly wrote: "Sensational love and crime feature, packed with action, and containing at least three good acting parts. ... The plot is strong, and could stand the elimination of much irrelevant material in the coroner's court and trial scenes. On the whole this British production is one that will make its mark, and it can be booked with the assurance of general success."

Variety wrote: "Starts off at a commendable pace, but doesn't carry through. With judicious cutting it can be made an interesting adventure story for local patrons and perhaps an okay programmer for the U.S. Douglas Fairbanks, Jr., turns in a splendid characterization as the young criminal, and Valerie Hobson as the society girl is that somewhat rare thing in British pictures – an actress rather than the usual vacuous type who has crashed pictures on her looks. Alan Hale as the older crook is duly ruthless and villainous, and the general supporting cast is more than adequate. Cuts towards the end of the picture will improve it out of all recognition."
