= The Bank Messenger Mystery =

1936 British film by Lawrence Huntington

- Advertisement from Kine Weekly, 9 May 1940
- Directed by: Lawrence Huntington
- Written by: Lawrence Huntington
- Produced by: Will Hammer
- Starring: George Mozart; Francesca Bahrle; Paul Neville
- Cinematography: Eric Cross
- Production company: Hammer Film Productions
- Distributed by: Renown Pictures (UK)
- Release date: 1940
- Running time: 56 minutes
- Country: United Kingdom
- Language: English

The Bank Messenger Mystery is a 1936 British crime film directed and written by Lawrence Huntington and starring George Mozart, Francesca Bahrle and Paul Neville. It was produced as a quota quickie by Will Hammer for Hammer Films.

== Preservation status ==
The British Film Institute National Archive holds no stills or ephemera, and no film or video materials.

== Plot ==
A bank cashier feels he has been wrongfully fired and teams up with some criminals to rob the bank.

== Cast ==
- George Mozart as George Brown
- Francesca Bahrle as Miss Brown
- Paul Neville as Harper
- Marilyn Love
- Frank Tickle
- Kenneth Kove

== Release ==
According to the British Film Institute's British Films, 1927–1939, the film was "in production" in 1936; however the BFI database gives the release date as 1940. Advertisements in the trade paper Kine Weekly indicate that the film was trade shown in 1940 in Manchester, Cardiff and London. In 1940 the Monthly Film Bulletin listed the film under "films issued between March 20 and April 24". The British Board of Film Classification dates the film as 1940.

The Encyclopedia of Hammer Films states that no actual evidence of a theatrical release exists. The entry for the film in Hammer Films: An Exhaustive Filmography mentions without evidence a 1936 trade show, and states "it is not known if it ever saw the inside of a theatre".

== Reception ==
Kine Weekly wrote: "The plot is stereotyed and the conclusion is obvious. Except for one short sequence, when the burglars are in the strong-room, action is slow. There is, however, both humour and sentiment mixed with the crooks' criminality, and the film should be acceptable to industrial type of programme. ...The suspense and the love angle will satisfy all but the sophisticated."
