= Accused (1936 film) =

1936 British film by Thornton Freeland

- Directed by: Thornton Freeland
- Written by: Zoë Akins; George Barraud; Harold French
- Produced by: Douglas Fairbanks Jr. Marcel Hellman
- Starring: Douglas Fairbanks Jr. Dolores del Río; Florence Desmond; Edward Rigby
- Cinematography: Victor Arménise; Jack Parker
- Edited by: Conrad von Molo
- Music by: Percival Mackey
- Production company: Criterion Films
- Distributed by: United Artists
- Release date: April 1936
- Running time: 83 minutes
- Country: United Kingdom
- Language: English

Accused is a 1936 British mystery film directed by Thornton Freeland and starring Douglas Fairbanks Jr., Dolores del Río and Florence Desmond. It was written by Zoë Akins, George Barraud and Harold French.

== Plot ==
Two dance partners become embroiled in a murder mystery when one of the dancers is accused of murder.

== Cast ==
- Douglas Fairbanks Jr. as Tony Seymour
- Dolores del Río as Gaby Seymour
- Florence Desmond as Yvette Delange
- Edward Rigby as Alphonse de la Riveire
- Basil Sydney as Eugene Roget
- Googie Withers as Ninette Duval
- J.H. Roberts as President of Court
- Cecil Humphreys as Prosecuting Counsel
- Esmé Percy as Morel
- Moore Marriott as Dubec
- Cyril Raymond as Guy Henry
- Roland Culver as Henry Capelle
- Leo Genn as man

== Production ==
The film was made at Isleworth Studios by the independent Criterion Films, of which Fairbanks was a co-owner. The film's sets were designed by Edward Carrick.

== Reception ==
The Monthly Film Bulletin wrote: "The scenes at the theatre previous to the murder and the trial scene are tedious and longwinded. Douglas Fairbanks, Jr., gives a very pleasant and, at times, forceful performance as a faithful husband in a series of difficult situations and Dolores del Rio is suitably exotic. But their dancing is pitiable. Florence Desmond is hopelessly miscast as Yvette. Direction is throughout pedestrian; production values generally are good."
