= Cafe Mascot =

1936 film by Lawrence Huntington

- Derrick De Marney, Richard Norris, Geraldine Fitzgerald and George Mozart in the film.
- Directed by: Lawrence Huntington
- Written by: Gerald Elliott; Cecil Arthur Lewis
- Produced by: Gabriel Pascal
- Starring: Geraldine Fitzgerald; Derrick De Marney
- Production company: Gabriel Pascal Productions
- Distributed by: Paramount British Pictures
- Release date: 1936
- Running time: 77 minutes
- Country: United Kingdom
- Language: English

Cafe Mascot is a 1936 British comedy film directed by Lawrence Huntington and starring Geraldine Fitzgerald. It was written by Gerald Elliott and Cecil Arthur Lewis, produced by Gabriel Pascal, and made as a quota quickie at Wembley Studios.

== Preservation status ==
The British Film Institute National Archive holds a collection of ephemera and stills but no film or video materials.

== Plot ==
A young man discovers £1,000 in a taxi. He gives it to an impoverished Irish girl by investing it in her business, the Cafe Mascot.

== Cast ==
- Geraldine Fitzgerald as Moira O'Flynn
- Derrick De Marney as Jerry Wilson
- George Mozart as George Juppley
- Clifford Heatherley as Dudhope
- Richard Norris as Nat Dawson
- Paul Neville as Peters
- Julian Vedey as Francois
- George Turner as Miles
- Geoffrey Clark as Benton

== Reception ==
The Monthly Film Bulletin wrote: "This film could have been an interesting commentary on contemporary financial methods, but instead we are given the petty and improbable intrigues of the original thieves to get back the lost money. But there is one delightful sketch of a magnificent business man who conscientiously breathes capital H's, and puts himself in the way of acquiring smuggled silks: this is Clifford Heatherley."

The Daily Film Renter wrote: "Sound idea neatly developed, with amusing comedy, pleasant romance, and spot of dramatics, although dialogue occasionally stodgy. Geraldine Fitzgerald makes attractive heroine, and technical qualities are entirely competent. Pleasing light entertainment of popular pattern."
