= Edward Rigby =

British actor (1879–1951)

- Born: Edward Coke; 5 February 1879; Ashford, Kent, England
- Died: 5 April 1951 (aged 72); Richmond, Surrey, England
- Occupation: Actor
- Years active: 1910–1951
- Spouse: Phyllis Austin (1888–1979)

Edward Coke MC (5 February 1879 – 5 April 1951), known professionally as Edward Rigby, was a British character actor.

== Early life ==
Rigby was born at Ashford, Kent, England, the second son of Dr William Harriott Coke and his wife, Mary Elizabeth. He was educated at Haileybury, and Wye Agricultural College. Under his real name, Edward Coke (Rigby was his mother's maiden name), he served in the Artists' Rifles and the Royal Field Artillery in World War I and was awarded the Military Cross, cited on 17 September 1917 "for conspicuous gallantry and devotion to duty as artillery liaison officer. At a time when all communication with his artillery group was severed, he made repeated attempts to restore the connection, and personally crossed a river under heavy fire in his efforts to mend the cable and to lay fresh ones. He showed the greatest gallantry and disregard of danger throughout the operation, and only desisted from his efforts on receiving the direct order from his headquarters to do so."

In 1912, Rigby married Phyllis Muriel Mary Austin, a novelist (1888–1979). Their son, Cyril Edward Rigby Coke, a television director, married Muriel Young (1923–2001), an ITV announcer and TV presenter.

== Stage and screen career ==
He made his first stage appearance in 1900 at the Grand Theatre in Fulham and later toured Australia, United States and Canada. He followed his first film appearance, the 1910 silent The Blue Bird, with roles in more than 150 films from 1933 to 1951.

== Death ==
He collapsed after a heart attack in the street at Richmond upon Thames and when taken to Richmond upon Thames Hospital was found to be dead. He was cremated at Mortlake Crematorium on 11 April 1951.

== Selected filmography ==
- The Blue Bird (1910, Short) – Bread
- Lorna Doone (1934) – Reuben 'Uncle Ben' Huckaback
- Windfall (1935) – Sam Spooner
- No Limit (1935) – Grandfather
- Gay Old Dog (1935) – Tom Bliss
- Queen of Hearts (1936) – Perkins
- This Green Hell (1936) – Dan Foyle
- Land Without Music (1936) – The Maestro
- Crime Over London (1936) – (uncredited)
- The Heirloom Mystery (1936) – Charles Marriott
- Accused (1936) – Alphonse de la Riveire
- Irish for Luck (1936) – Hon. Denis Maguire
- Jump for Glory (1937) – Sanders
- The Show Goes On (1937) – Mr. Scowcroft, Sally's Father
- The Fatal Hour (1937) – Cready
- Under a Cloud (1937) – Jimmy Forbes
- Mr. Smith Carries On (1937) – Mr. Smith
- Young and Innocent (1937) – Old Will
- A Yank at Oxford (1938) – Scatters
- Kicking the Moon Around (1938) – Prof. Scattlebury
- Yellow Sands (1938) – Tom Major
- The Ware Case (1938) – Tommy Bold
- Keep Smiling (1938) – Silas Gray
- The Four Just Men (1939) – (uncredited)
- There Ain't No Justice (1939) – Pa Mutch
- Poison Pen (1939) – Badham
- Young Man's Fancy (1939) – Gray
- The Stars Look Down (1940) – Robert Fenwick
- The Proud Valley (1940) – Bert
- Convoy (1940) – Mr. Matthews
- Girl in the News (1940) – Hospital Secretary (uncredited)
- Sailors Don't Care (1940) – Joe Clark
- The Farmer's Wife (1941) – Tom Gurney
- Fingers (1941) – Sam Bromley
- Major Barbara (1941) – Man on Quayside (uncredited)
- Kipps (1941) – Buggins
- The Common Touch (1941) – 'Tich'
- Penn of Pennsylvania (1941) – Bushell
- Flying Fortress (1942) – Dan Billings (uncredited)
- Let the People Sing (1942) – Timmy Tiverton
- Salute John Citizen (1942) – Mr. Bunting
- Went the Day Well? (1942) – Bill Purvis
- Get Cracking (1943) – Sam Elliott
- They Met in the Dark (1943) – Mansel
- A Canterbury Tale (1944) – Jim Horton
- Don't Take It to Heart (1944) – Butler
- I Live in Grosvenor Square (1945) – Innkeeper
- The Agitator (1945) – Charlie Branfield
- Perfect Strangers (1945) – Charlie
- Murder in Reverse (1945) – Spike
- The Years Between (1946) – Postman
- Quiet Weekend (1946) – Sam Pecker
- Piccadilly Incident (1946) – Judd
- Temptation Harbour (1947) – Tatem
- The Courtneys of Curzon Street (1947) – Mr. R (Stock Exchange Sweeper / Cleaner) (uncredited)
- Green Fingers (1947) – Albert Goodman
- The Loves of Joanna Godden (1947) – Stuppeny
- Easy Money (1948) – Teddy (segment The Teddy Ball Story)
- The Three Weird Sisters (1948) – Waldo
- Daybreak (1948) – Bill Shackle
- Noose (1948) – Slush
- It's Hard to Be Good (1948) – Parkinson
- All Over the Town (1949) – Grimmett
- Christopher Columbus (1949) – Pedro
- Don't Ever Leave Me (1949) – Harry Denton
- A Run for Your Money (1949) – Beefeater
- Rover and Me (1949) – Mr. Maggott
- Poet's Pub – Pageant watching villager (uncredited)
- The Happiest Days of Your Life (1950) – Rainbow
- Double Confession (1950) – The Fisherman
- Tony Draws a Horse (1950) – Grandpa
- What the Butler Saw (1950) – The Earl
- The Mudlark (1950) – The Watchman (uncredited)
- Into the Blue (1950) – Bill, the Skipper
- Circle of Danger (1951) – Idwal Llewellyn (final film role)
