= J. Elder Wills =

British art director and film director (1900–1970)

James Ernest Elder Wills (1900–1970) was a British person who had a lengthy career in the film industry.

He mainly worked as an art director, but he also worked in other roles, including director.

Films he was involved in include Tiger Bay, The Quatermass Xperiment, and The Men of Sherwood Forest.

He was a colonel during the Second World War who worked in I.S.R.B. designing, signing and building camouflaged explosive devices for agents operating against the Germans and Japanese. The story he wrote for the film Against the Wind was based upon his wartime experiences.

== Selected filmography ==
- The First Mrs. Fraser (1932) - Art Director
- Holiday Lovers (1932) - Art Director
- Tiger Bay (1934) - Director
- Honeymoon for Three (1935) - Art Director
- Everything in Life (1936) - Director
- Sporting Love (1936) - Director
- Song of Freedom (1936) - Director
- Big Fella (1937) - Director
- Look Before You Love (1948) - Art Director
- Against the Wind (1948) - Story and Art Director
- The Men of Sherwood Forest (1954) - Art Director
- The Quatermass Xperiment (1955) - Art Director
