= Dial 999 (1938 film) =

1938 British film by Lawrence Huntington

- Elizabeth Kent and John Longden in the film.
- Directed by: Lawrence Huntington
- Written by: Ernest Dudley; Gerald Elliott; Lawrence Huntington
- Produced by: Edward Dryhurst
- Starring: John Longden; Elizabeth Kent; Neville Brook
- Cinematography: Stanley Grant
- Edited by: Peter Tanner
- Production company: 20th Century Fox
- Distributed by: 20th Century Fox
- Release date: 27 June 1938
- Running time: 46 minutes
- Country: United Kingdom
- Language: English

Dial 999 is a 1938 British crime film directed by Lawrence Huntington and starring John Longden, Elizabeth Kent and Neville Brook. It was written by Ernest Dudley, Gerald Elliott and Huntington, and was made as a quota quickie by 20th Century Fox at Wembley Studios.

The film's title aimed to capitalise on the recent introduction of the emergency telephone number 999.

== Plot ==
Scotland Yard is investigating a flood of highly plausible counterfeit banknotes, and are on the trail of the perpetrator. He ultimately turns out to be none other than the expert employed at the Yard to spot forged notes.

== Cast ==
- John Longden as Bill Waring
- Elizabeth Kent as Margot Curtis
- Neville Brook as Hicks
- Ian Fleming as Sir Edward Rigg
- Paul Neville as Inspector Morris
- Ivan Wilmot as Gelder
- Victor Hagen as Brandon
- Cecil Bishop as Baker
- Howard Douglas as Davis
- Joe Mott as Lang
- Paul Sheridan as Mario

== Reception ==
The Monthly Film Bulletin wrote: "The film is well photographed and produced, with specially significant sound effects, and the story contains a real surprise."

Kine Weekly wrote: "Very deficient in romantic interest and there is little punch in it. Acting and production are both unremarkable."

The Daily Film Renter wrote: "Feeble drama depicting Scotland Yard in action against master counterfeiter who turns out to be banknote expert employed by police. Stodgy acting, banal dialogue, and unconvincing plot militate against entertainment values, subject representing offering for most uncritical patrons only. ... Put over to the tune of banal dialogue, ludicrous melodrama, and unconvincing situations, the film offers very little in the way of entertainment, while the acting is definitely stodgy."

Picture Show wrote: "This drama (it is a little too mild to be called melodrama) deals with a Scotland Yard man's adventures in tracking down a gang of forgers. Acting and direction fair."
