= George Mozart =

British actor and screenwriter (1864–1947)

- Born: David John Gillings; 15 February 1864; Great Yarmouth, Norfolk, England
- Died: 10 December 1947 (aged 83); London, England
- Occupations: Comedian, actor
- Years active: 1873–1947

George Mozart (born David John Gillings; 15 February 1864 – 10 December 1947) was a British music hall comedian, actor and singer, with a career lasting over 70 years.

== Biography ==
He was born in Great Yarmouth, and began his career at the age of nine playing side-drums at the Theatre Royal in the town. He trained with the Prince of Wales’ Own Norfolk Artillery Band, and played clarinet and violin in local music hall orchestras, before joining a circus as a clown. He became a member of the Livermore Brothers Court Minstrels, as a violinist and comedian, and made his London debut in blackface in 1886.

He formed a double act as 'Engist and Orsa - Musical Clowns', and then formed a comedy and musical duo, 'Warrington and Gillings' with Charles Warrington. They changed their name to 'The Mozarts', and first appeared together in London in 1891. They became successful, and had a 12-month season under Charles Morton at the Palace Theatre.

In 1895, George Mozart was seen by Sir Augustus Harris, who offered him a part in a pantomime at the Theatre Royal, Drury Lane. He agreed to become a solo performer, and began appearing in more pantomimes and variety shows. His career peaked between then and the outbreak of the First World War. According to writer Roy Busby, he "became one of the finest character comedians and pantomime artistes, topping bills at all the major halls for nearly 30 years notably with the one-man sketches 'A Soldier and a Maid' and 'The Family Album'". W. J. MacQueen-Pope described his "thumb-nail sketches" as "...high art and masterpieces of comic characterisation and observation..".

He made several recordings of his routines, around and shortly after 1900. According to his accompanist Fred Gaisberg, he made his first recordings having changed into full costume and make-up, assuming he could also be seen by listeners. He toured the United States vaudeville circuit in 1907. He had an interest in film making, appearing in, and directing, several short silent films including Coney as Peacemaker (1913). In 1915, he made his first appearance in a revue, playing Queen Elizabeth in André Charlot's Now is the Time.

During the 1920s, he was landlord of the Green Man and French Horn pub in Covent Garden, but continued to perform in variety shows. He also appeared in several films in the 1930s, including The Indiscretions of Eve (1932), The Medicine Man (1933), The Public Life of Henry the Ninth (1935), The Mystery of the Mary Celeste (starring Bela Lugosi, 1935), Song of Freedom (starring Paul Robeson, 1936), and Full Speed Ahead (1936). Mozart was a founder director of Hammer Film Productions, which made several of the films.

He published an autobiography, Limelight, in 1938. His last appearance was at the Victoria Palace, London, a few nights before his death.

He died in London in 1947, at the age of 83.

== Filmography ==
Year	Title	Role	Notes
1932	The Indiscretions of Eve	Smart	
1933	The Medicine Man	Sir Timothy Rugg	
1935	The Public Life of Henry the Ninth	Draughts Player	
1935	The Mystery of the Mary Celeste	Tommy Duggan	
1936	Strange Cargo	'Orace	
1936	Two on a Doorstep	George	
1936	Cafe Mascot	George Juppley	
1936	Song of Freedom	Bert Puddick	
1936	Full Speed Ahead	Chief Smith	
1936	The Bank Messenger Mystery	George Brown	
1937	Jump for Glory		
1937	Chinatown Nights	Bill	
1937	Pygmalion	Third Bystander	(final film role)
