= Song of Freedom =

- Directed by: J. Elder Wills
- Screenplay by: Ingram D'Abbes; Fenn Hill Sherie
- Based on: The Kingdom of Zinga by Claude Wallace & Dorothy Holloway
- Produced by: William Hinds; Enrique Carreras
- Starring: Paul Robeson; Elisabeth Welch; George Mozart; Esmé Percy
- Cinematography: Eric Cross; T.A. Glover; Harry Rose
- Edited by: Arthur Tavares
- Music by: Eric Ansell; Jack Beaver
- Production company: Hammer Film Productions
- Distributed by: British Lion Films
- Release date: 17 August 1936
- Running time: 80 minutes
- Country: United Kingdom
- Language: English
- Budget: $500,000

Song of Freedom is a 1936 British musical drama film directed by J. Elder Wills and starring Paul Robeson, Elisabeth Welch, Esmé Percy and Robert Adams. It was written by Ingram D'Abbes and Fenn Hill Sherie based on a story by Claude Wallace and Dorothy Holloway. It is an early feature produced by Hammer Film Productions.

John Zinga is a black dockworker in England with a great bass-baritone singing voice. He is discovered by an opera impresario and becomes an international star. Yet he feels alienated from his African past, and out of place in England. By chance, he is informed that an ancestral medallion he wears proves his lineage to African kings, and he leaves fame and fortune behind to take his rightful place as royalty. Reunited with his people, he plans to improve their lives by combining Western technology with the best of African tradition.

Although unsuccessful in the US, it was notably chosen in 1950 to open the convention of Ghana's Convention People's Party. The ceremonies were presided over by future first Prime Minister of independent Ghana, Kwame Nkrumah, Robeson's friend from his London years.

== Plot ==
The first part of the film's story takes place in the year 1700 on an island called Casanga off the west coast of Africa. The island has not yet attracted the attention of the slave traders on the mainland, but its people are suffering fierce oppression under their hereditary queen Zinga - a tyrant, despot, and mistress of cruelty.

What first appears on screen is a grassland landscape in which men of an African tribe are patrolling, with haystacks and rugged hills in the background. Into this scene there comes a bare-chested young African, as strong as a bull, looking around him cautiously.

Next we see the brutal Queen Zinga, wearing a leopard-skin dress, a straw hat, and a shell necklace on which hangs a medallion, a symbol of kingship. Laughing vigorously, she is teasing a man tied on a wooden column, who is supposed to be the king of Casanga. Zinga takes off the necklace and puts it on the man's neck, taunting him as a "one-second king" and trying to kill him straight away. Suddenly, a girl, apparently frustrated by the cruelty of the planned execution, rushes towards the queen, grabs the medallion, and runs off. Astonished, the queen orders her soldiers to catch the fleeing girl and to recover the medallion. However, with the help of the strong young man seen at the beginning of the film, she is able to escape from the soldiers and the two get onto a raft to row it to the mainland. Once there, they turn to a white slave-trader for help. The slaver happily accepts them into his camp and adds them to his chain. Then, along with all the other blacks the slaver has acquired, the couple is filled with anxiety and fear. Sent to England by boat to begin their new life, they are not sure what is in store for them.

Time runs on and historical events unfold, such as the abolition of the slave trade in the British Empire in 1807. But not until 1838 did the slaves themselves become free from the oppressing situation and the social status for blacks start to improve. Chains and handcuffs are destroyed, ropes and whips are burned, and a seemingly brand new story begins, centring on John Zinga, a black dockworker in England with a great baritone singing voice. His singing impresses all his colleagues on the wharf. Children in his apartment block fall asleep soundly when he sings, but he himself doesn't realize what use he can make use of his voice. In fact, what keeps hovering in his mind is the eagerness to discover his true origins and to help his own people, although he doesn't know who they are. Zinga always considers himself out of place in London and is often blamed by his wife for being ‘not satisfied’, but never does he change his mind. Finally, one day an opera impresario hears him singing and tries his best to find out about him. And in a pub, while Zinga is being invited by the owner to sing the song "Lonely Road", Gabriel Donizetti, the famous impresario, comes quietly in from the door and sits in the audience, watching, listening, and enjoying the beautiful song. "No more docker, but a great career" Donizetti promises Zinga, who is shocked and surprised since he thinks he can achieve his dream of travelling back to Africa by this chance. They shake hands with each other and Donizetti leaves a card for Zinga to come to his hotel room the next day.

Zinga can't wait to go. The next day he dresses in a suit, apparently for the first time since he both walks and acts in a lame and inappropriate way. Zinga's wife is also with him to deal with the hotel managers. In the end they find the way to Donizetti's room and he starts a series of tests and introduces several skills to help Zinga improve his singing. At first Zinga is reluctant to accept these instructions, like ‘breathing from the stomach’ and ‘singing from the breast’, claiming that he knows how to sing. And he fights against singing in a suit, since he doesn't feel ‘free’. His voice significantly lacks emotion compared to when he sings freely with friends and in a pub about his homeland in Africa. But after his wife's comforting, mainly focussing on the chance of travelling back to Africa, he is persuaded to follow those doctrinaire rules and techniques.

After long training and practice, Zinga becomes an international opera star and succeeds in all kind of concerts and dramas. This brings him wealth and fame that he has never dreamt of. Yet he feels alienated from his African past, always being sarcastic towards his slave-born identity as his being referred as the Negro King. One day after a great performance, Zinga is instructed to give a speech about what he feels about his success. Not good at public speaking, he sings an old song derived from his long lost childhood memory that he barely remembers and into which has to put some words. In the song, he himself is regarded as a ‘wanderer’ and ‘hears the cold felt by his people’. John has a feeling that by singing the song he may find out some information about his origins, which means much to him. The result does not fail him. The song is moving and invokes one of the audience's memories about the song. He comes to the dressing room at the back of the stage and talk to John about what he knows. John then finds out that his ancestor belongs to the island of Casanga, located on the west coast of Africa. The man from the audience, Pele, was the only white man to escape from the island since it was dominated by a brutal queen, and it is now ruled by a wicked witch doctor. And the song John sang was the secret song passed on by every king, regarded as the "Song of Freedom" of the Casanga people. Pele also tells Zinga the medallion hanging on his neck, which he got from his father and his father had from his great-grandfather, is the symbol of the kingship-----he, John Zinga, is the king of his people. Hearing that his people are still uncivilized on the island, Zinga's idea of going back to his homeland to help his people became even more fixed. At this time Donizetti happens to come in and tells John some good news - a new contract to work in the great New York City. Zinga refuses to go to New York to carry on his singing career, since he considers his people bigger than his success. Donizetti is mad about Zinga leaving his career, but cannot stop him from crossing the ocean to come to the little island in Africa.

When Zinga arrives on the island he, his wife and a servant are not trusted by the aboriginals. Even though they have the same skin colour and Zinga has the medallion which proves him the king, he and his fellows are still considered out-siders, strangers or even bad guys coming from the whites’ country. That's far from Zinga's expectation, which lets him down for a time. His servant wants to resign and tell him to give up, even he himself thinks the place is too primitive and his people are too hard to change. But his wife stands by his side and encourages him ‘the worse things are, the more you can change’. Soon he cheers up and waits for his chance in a shabby dome. And it comes. Zinga finds out that the witch doctor locks patients up instead of treating them for the lack of medicine. The witch doctor also announces that when a person gets sick - no matter a fever or cancer - he's dead rather than ill. To deal with this inhuman act, Zinga gives the patient medicine and tries to heal them. Some of the people start to believe in Zinga. They tell him "I'm your man, but you can be no king." But this doesn't last long when the witch doctor began to form various rituals to cast the ‘disaster’ the outsiders brought to the island. What's worse is that the people's trust in Zinga diminishes since the patients he tried to cure all die. To break the superstition Zinga interrupts the rites, attempting to show that no taboos are going to act on him, but is scolded by the crowds. Therefore, the witch doctor come up with a task of bringing the rain. He claims that by rituals he can always bring rains to the island, then the gods and ghosts will be satisfied and cast no disaster and diseases to the men and women; yet Zinga points out frankly that the cause of disease is the bacteria and germs in the river and he cannot bring rains but he can help saving the rain. And he begins to illustrate the amazing life brought by technology improvement from the other side of the ocean. With the help of his followers, more and more and people of the clan believe in him.

The witch doctor is so angry that he jumps up and down to try to scare people from getting in touch with Zinga. While they are debating, Zinga's wife runs out and shouts to the witch doctor to support her husband. But that violates the taboo of not letting women join the ritual and the witch doctor feels perfectly justified to put Zinga's wife in the basement. Zinga, who tried to protect his wife, is also tied up by the army. They are going to execute both of them the next day. And by the moonlight, Zinga's wife sang miserably to him to show her dismay. Zinga's followers bring him his gun but he refuses it. He determines not to use force to hurt his people but to convince them in other way.

Next day the ritual is being held. The witch doctor performs different kinds of tricks, such as fire swallowing to intimidate his people, so that Zinga's followers are afraid to rescue them. Both Zinga and his wife are tied to a wooden pole, waiting to be killed, just as hundreds of years ago, the evil in charge of the island won against the justice. Then the drums for the execution start, and the rhythm starts to sound increasingly familiar to Zinga. It's the Song of Freedom, the secret song passed on by each king of the island. He can't help but start singing the Song and sings so well that the crowds turn astonishment to appreciation and admiration. He's the king!! Someone from the crowd shouts out and the people eventually believe he is the king and are willing to listen to him. Zinga wins against the witch doctor at last and achieves his dream. He goes back to America and frequently brings back medicine and technology of all kinds, helping his people to become civilized and educated.

At the end of the movie, Zinga picks up his career as a singer again and performs the song he sang a long time ago, "Lonely Road" on a stage decorated as his little island, referring to his achieving his dream and the help he brought to his people, leading them to a better life.

== Cast ==
- Paul Robeson as John 'Johnny' Zinga
- Elisabeth Welch as Ruth Zinga
- Esmé Percy as Gabriel Donozetti
- Robert Adams as Monty
- James Solomon as native leader
- Ecce Homo Toto as Mandingo
- Ronald Simpson as Blane, the pianist
- George Mozart as Bert Puddick
- Jenny Dean as Marian
- Joan Fred Emney as Nell Puddick
- Bernard Ansell as Sir James Pyrie
- Johnnie Schofield
- Ambrose Manning as trader
- Arthur Elliott (as Hon. Arthur Eliot)
- Cornelia Smith as Queen Zinga

== Production ==
Robeson was also given final-cut approval, an unprecedented option for an actor of any race.

As in Sanders of the River, Song called for documentary scenes of West African traditional dances and ceremonies.

== Reception ==
=== Box office ===
Advertised as a "$500,000 epic" (an above-average sum for a British film in the mid-1930s), Song of Freedom did quite well at the box-office—excepting in the southern states of the U.S.A.

=== Critical ===
The Monthly Film Bulletin wrote: "The story is unusual and well thought out. The idea of the ancestral song being freed from the hero's subconscious mind in circumstances of great necessity is good, and is very well handled. There is, of course, much sentiment, but on every occasion it has its proper setting and place, The history of the passing century is well portrayed by short well-chosen glimpses of salient events in the negroes' life, such as the plantations and the abolition speeches. The film is well cast and the acting is uniformly good ... The songs, including "Lonely Road," "Song of Freedom," "Sleepy River" and "Stepping Stones," are good and sung as only Robeson could sing them. The native settings are natural and the native dancing is exciting and well photographed. The only criticism is that of the film's exaggerated philanthropy: even the villains are tenderhearted:"

Writing for The Spectator in 1936, Graham Greene gave the film a mixed review, describing the direction as "distinguished but not above reproach" and noting that "the story is sentimental and absurd, and yet a sense stays in the memory of an unsophisticated mind fumbling on the edge of simple and popular poetry". Greene praises Welch and the singing of Robeson, however he finds that "everything goes badly wrong when Zinga reaches Africa" – the point in the film at which Greene finds the story to lose its believability.

Lionel Collier, for the British magazine, Picturegoer, also commented that the film declined in credibility when the action moved to Africa, writing, "the artificiality becomes more pronounced and the action very ingenuous." He wrote that "Paul Robeson’s singing is the main thing in this drama."
