= Julian Vedey =

British actor (1898–1967)

Julian Vedey (b. Warwickshire, 1898; d. Worthing, 1967) was a British actor.

== Selected filmography ==
- Romance in Rhythm (1934)
- Cafe Mascot (1936)
- Strange Cargo (1936)
- Full Speed Ahead (1936)
- Command Performance (1937)
- The Green Cockatoo (1937)
- Saturday Night Revue (1937)
- Calling All Ma's (1937)
- Night Ride (1937)
- Missing, Believed Married (1937)
- Keep Fit (1937)
- Melody and Romance (1937)
- Sunset in Vienna (1937)
- Keep Smiling (1938)
- Kicking the Moon Around (1938)
- A Spot of Bother (1938)
- What Would You Do, Chums? (1939)
- Inspector Hornleigh (1939)
- We'll Smile Again (1942)
- The Bells Go Down (1943)
