= Southern Roses =

1936 film

- Opening titles
- Directed by: Frederic Zelnik
- Written by: Rudolph Bernauer; Neil Gow
- Produced by: Isadore Goldsmith; Max Schach
- Starring: George Robey; Neil Hamilton; Gina Malo; Chili Bouchier
- Cinematography: Philip Tannura
- Edited by: Edward B. Jarvis
- Music by: Hans May
- Production companies: Capitol Film Corporation; Grafton Films
- Distributed by: General Film Distributors
- Release date: 30 September 1936
- Running time: 78 minutes
- Country: United Kingdom
- Language: English

Southern Roses is a 1936 British musical comedy film directed by Frederic Zelnik and starring George Robey, Gina Malo and Chili Bouchier. It was written by Rudolph Bernauer and Neil Gow, and shot at Denham Studios with sets were designed by the art director Frederick Pusey.

== Plot ==
Paint manufacturere Mr. Higgins and society woman Mrs. Rowland are facing a legal battele over a patent paint formula. A solution is for Higgins' son Bill to marry Mrs. Rowland's daughter Mary, but Bill has already secretly married temperamental Spanish dancer Estrella Estrello. Mary keeps Bill's marriage a secret from his father by impersonating Estrella.

== Cast ==
- George Robey as Mr. Higgins
- Neil Hamilton as Reggie
- Gina Malo as Mary Rowland
- Chili Bouchier as Estrella Estrello
- Vera Pearce as Carrie
- Richard Dolman as Bill Higgins
- Athene Seyler as Mrs. Rowland
- D. A. Clarke-Smith as Senor Estrello
- Sara Allgood as Miss Florence
- Leslie Perrins as Don Ramon
- Hal Gordon as Mr. Mountford
- Gus McNaughton as Parker

== Reception ==
The Monthly Film Bulletin wrote: "Comedy of false identities, involving four naval officers, a cabaret dancer, a society beauty, and a wealthy paint manufacturer. The last is played by George Robey, who is billed as the star. But his appearances are rare and short, and his material, except for a mock Parliamentary speech, is unworthy of his genius."

Kine Weekly wrote: "Farcical romantic comedy with a song or two thrown in, manufactured from a somewhat hackneyed pre-war musical comedy stage formula. The principal players make the most of the slender opportunities afforded by the stereotyped theme, one of transparent deception; the song numbers are pleasantly tuneful, and the staging is elegant, but nothing can remove from the inconsequential happenings the feeling that the march of time has robbed it of much of its pristine glory."
