= Pay Box Adventure =

- Directed by: W. P. Kellino
- Written by: Gerald Elliott
- Produced by: Anthony Havelock-Allan
- Starring: Syd Crossley; Marjorie Corbett; Roxie Russell
- Cinematography: Francis Carver
- Production company: British and Dominions
- Distributed by: Paramount British Pictures
- Release date: June 1936
- Running time: 68 minutes
- Country: United Kingdom
- Language: English

Pay Box Adventure is a 1936 British crime film directed by W. P. Kellino and starring Syd Crossley, Marjorie Corbett and Roxie Russell. It was made at Elstree Studios as a quota quickie.

== Cast ==
- Syd Crossley as Tom Furlong
- Marjorie Corbett as Mary Blake
- Roxie Russell as Enid Soames
- Billy Watts as Jimmy Trevor
- Eric Fawcett as Sidney Parke
- Molly Hamley-Clifford as Mrs. Bartlett
- George Turner as Gus

== Bibliography ==
- Chibnall, Steve. Quota Quickies: The Birth of the British 'B' Film. British Film Institute, 2007.
- Low, Rachael. Filmmaking in 1930s Britain. George Allen & Unwin, 1985.
- Wood, Linda. British Films, 1927-1939. British Film Institute, 1986.
