= Strange Cargo (1936 film) =

- Kathleen Kelly and George Sanders in the film
- Directed by: Lawrence Huntington
- Written by: Gerald Elliott
- Produced by: Lawrence Huntington
- Starring: Kathleen Kelly; George Mozart; Moore Marriott; George Sanders
- Cinematography: Eric Cross
- Production company: British & Dominions
- Distributed by: Paramount British Pictures
- Release date: March 1936
- Running time: 68 minutes
- Country: United Kingdom
- Language: English

Strange Cargo (also known as Breakers Ahead) is a 1936 British crime film directed by Lawrence Huntington and starring Kathleen Kelly, George Mozart and Moore Marriott. It was written by Gerald Elliott, and was made as a quota quickie.. The film is notable for an early performance by George Sanders who went on to success in Hollywood.

== Preservation status ==
The British Film Institute National Archive holds no stills or ephemera, and no film or video materials.

== Plot ==
Roddy Burch is first mate on a cargo and passenger ship, captained by his father. He saves Sonia, a dancer in a South American café, from a bogus charge of murder by arranging for her to become a stowaway. The captain discovers her, but allows her to stay by working as a cook. She subsequently helps to unmask a gang of gun runners posing as passengers, and finds romance with Roddy.

== Cast ==
- Kathleen Kelly as Sonia
- George Mozart as 'Orace
- Moore Marriott as Captain Burch
- George Sanders as Roddy Burch
- Richard Norris as Travers
- Geoffrey Clarke as Rev. Twiddell
- Kenneth Warrington as Captain Mandera
- Julian Vedey as customs officer
- Harry Lane as Garcia
- Conway Palmer as Whitemore
- Alvin Saxon and his Murray Club Band as themselves

== Production ==
The film was made at British and Dominions Elstree Studios for release by Paramount Pictures.

== Reception ==
The Monthly Film Bulletin wrote: "The acting, with the exception of the captain's son, is good and some of the smaller parts are very well done. The direction is competent, but the film is not very striking and the excitement is lost in the very slow development of the story."

Kine Weekly wrote: "Here we have a British idea of a rollicking melodrama of gun-running in South American waters, and a pretty insignificant one it is. The story never for a moment convinces, the aboard-ship action is absurdly cramped, comedy relief feeble, and individual character-drawing far less effective than the strenuous efforts of the principals deserve. With the "A" certificate to deprive it of a juvenile patronage, the only one to which its naive schoolboy flavour is likely to appeal, its fate hangs solely on its quota ticket. ... Moore Marriott is not too bad as the fiery Captain Burch, Kathleen Kelly suggests with fair effect the plight of the maid in distress, and Georze Mozart, veteran of the music-halls, occasionally amuses as a bungling ship's cook, but George Saunders is very wooden as Roddy, and the supporting players are hopeless as South American revolutionaries."

Picturegoer wrote: "This attempt to present a story of gun running in South American waters has litte punch or pep and is so cramped in its setting that it carries no conviction and is sometimes unconsciously funny. The character drawing is negligible and as a whole the picture lacks the polish of present-day productions."

Picture Show wrote: "Competent acting and drirection. Fair entertainment."
