= Wolf's Clothing (1936 film) =

- Swedish poster
- Directed by: Andrew Marton
- Written by: Evadne Price; Brock Williams
- Produced by: Richard Wainwright
- Starring: Claude Hulbert; Gordon Harker; Lilli Palmer
- Cinematography: Philip Tannura
- Music by: Allan Gray
- Production company: Richard Wainwright Productions
- Distributed by: General Film Distributors
- Release date: 17 March 1936
- Running time: 80 minutes
- Country: United Kingdom
- Language: English

Wolf's Clothing is a 1936 British comedy film directed by Andrew Marton and starring Claude Hulbert, Gordon Harker and Lilli Palmer. It was written by Evadne Price and Brock Williams, and made at Shepperton Studios by the independent producer Richard Wainwright.

The screenplay concerns a blundering group of secret agents who mistake a Foreign Office official for an international assassin.

== Preservation status ==
The British Film Institute National Archive holds a collection of stills but no film or video materials.

== Plot ==
The British Secret Service sends nitwit Ambrose Girling to break up a gang of international assassins, headquartered in Paris. There, he meets Lydia, and through her infiltrates the gang. Thinking him an assassin, the incompetent gangsters order him to kill a British politician, but then discover his true identity. Ambrose escapes, helps to round up the gang, and marries Lydia.

== Cast ==
- Claude Hulbert as Ambrose Girling
- Gordon Harker as Prosser
- Lilli Palmer as Lydia
- George Graves as Sir Roger Balmayne
- Peter Gawthorne as Sir Hector
- Helen Haye as Mildred Girling
- Joan Swinstead as Mary Laming
- Frank Birch as Reverend John Laming
- Ernest Sefton as Finden Charvet
- George Hayes as Yassiov
- Shayle Gardner as Babo
- Violet Gould as kiosk proprietress
- Madame von Major as Babo's mother

== Reception ==
Kine Weekly wrote: "Rousing adventure comedy burlesque, backed up by a good story, an excellent comedy team resourceful direction, an eager supporting cast, hearty punch, and an unfailing capacity for turning out really bright gags. The picture travels at whirlwind pace from start to finish, yet never deserts popular romance in its successful pursuit of laughter and thrills. Claude Hulbert and Gordon Harker the one vacuous and the other ribald, form a grand new comedy partnership, and Lilli Palmer puts sex appeal into the love interest, while George Graves, his usual peppery self heads an excellent supporting cast."

The Daily Film Renter wrote: "Staged mainly in Paris, with quota of serio-comic fistics, and climax depicting hero's hair-raising adventures in sewer labyrinth, subject affords co-stars ample scope for familiar styles of work, and should prove good, hearty entertainment for the masses. Claude Hulbert and Gordon Harker team together here with excellent effect, their widely divergent styles of comedy resulting in an entertaining partnership that could well be continued in future subjects."
