= Geraldine Fitzgerald =

Irish actress (1913–2005)

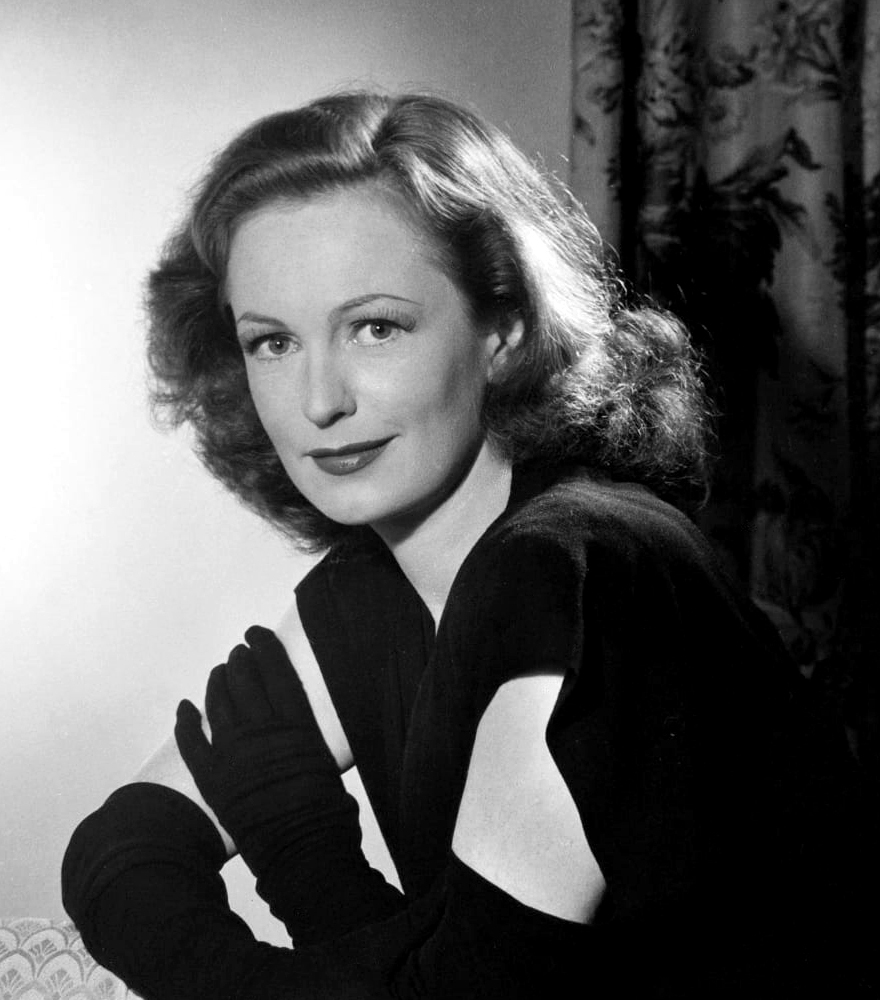
- Fitzgerald in 1944
- Born: Geraldine Mary Wilma Fitzgerald; November 24, 1913; Dublin, Ireland
- Died: July 17, 2005 (aged 91); Upper East Side, Manhattan, New York, U.S.
- Resting place: Woodlawn Cemetery in The Bronx, New York, U.S.
- Occupation: Actress
- Years active: 1932–1991
- Spouses: Edward Lindsay-Hogg (m. 1936; div. 1946) Stuart Straus Scheftel (m. 1946; died 1994)
- Children: 2, including Michael Lindsay-Hogg

Geraldine Mary Wilma Fitzgerald (November 24, 1913 – July 17, 2005) was an Irish American actress. She received the Daytime Emmy Award as well as nominations for an Academy Award, a Primetime Emmy Award, and a Tony Award. She was a member of the American Theater Hall of Fame and was inducted into the Hollywood Walk of Fame. In 2020 she was listed at number 30 on The Irish Times list of Ireland's greatest film actors.

She made her film debut in the British thriller Blind Justice (1934). She went on to receive a nomination for the Academy Award for Best Supporting Actress for her portrayal of Isabella Linton in the William Wyler-directed romantic drama Wuthering Heights (1939). She acted in classic Hollywood films such as Dark Victory (1939), Watch on the Rhine (1943), and Wilson (1944). Her later films included The Pawnbroker (1964), Rachel, Rachel (1968), Harry and Tonto (1974), Arthur (1981), Easy Money (1983), and Poltergeist II: The Other Side (1986).

== Early life ==
Fitzgerald was born at 85 Lower Leeson Street, Dublin, the daughter of Edith Catherine (née Richards) and Edward Martin FitzGerald, who was a lawyer. The family would later live in Greystones, County Wicklow. Her father was Roman Catholic, and her mother was a Protestant who converted to Catholicism.

She studied painting at the Dublin Metropolitan School of Art (which became the National College of Art in 1936 and, later again in 1971, the National College of Art and Design). Inspired by her aunt, actress Shelah Richards, Fitzgerald began her acting career in 1932 at Dublin's Gate Theatre. After two seasons in Dublin she moved to London, where she found success in British films including The Mill on the Floss, Turn of the Tide, and Cafe Mascot.

== Career ==
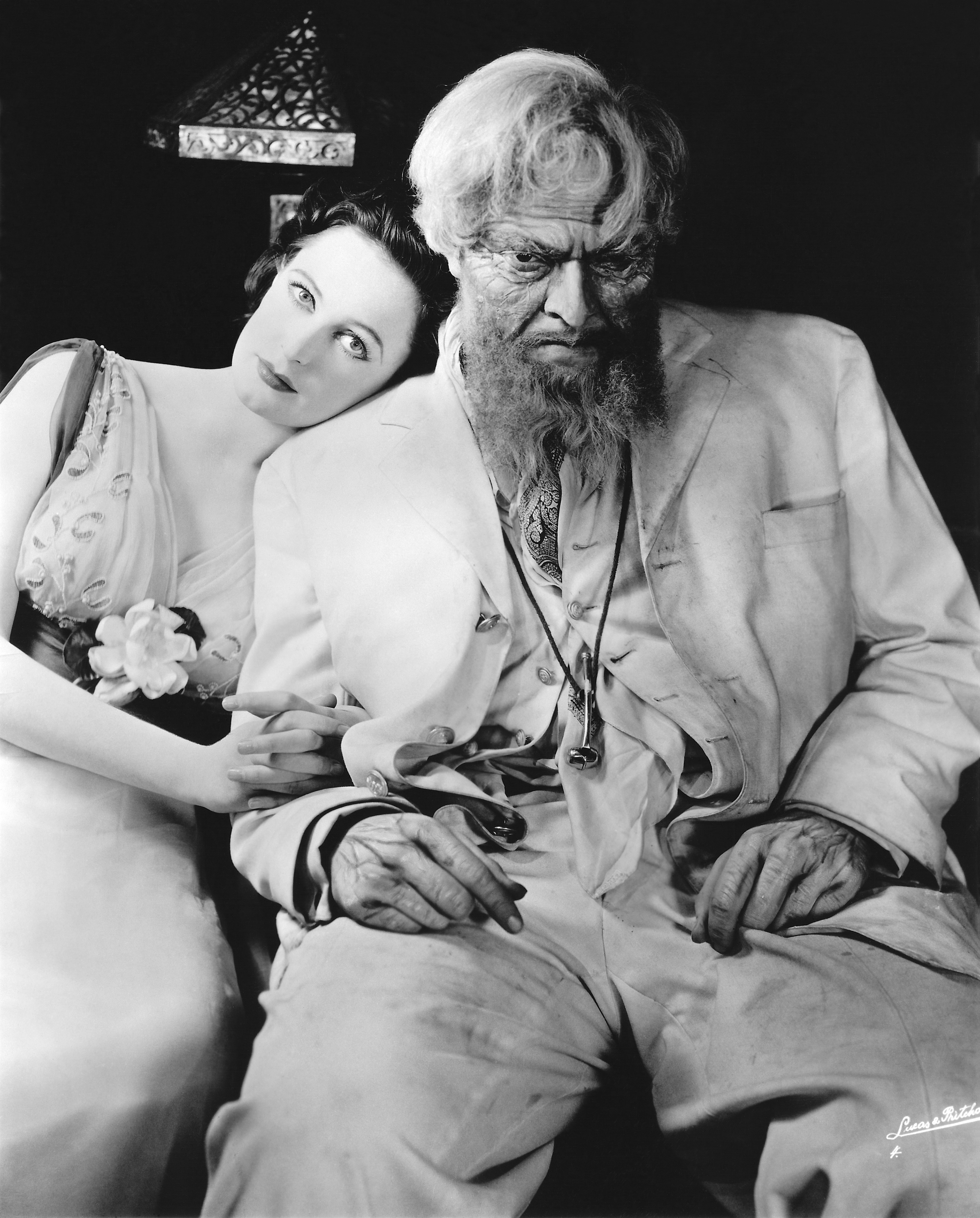
Fitzgerald with Orson Welles in the Mercury Theatre production of Heartbreak House (1938)

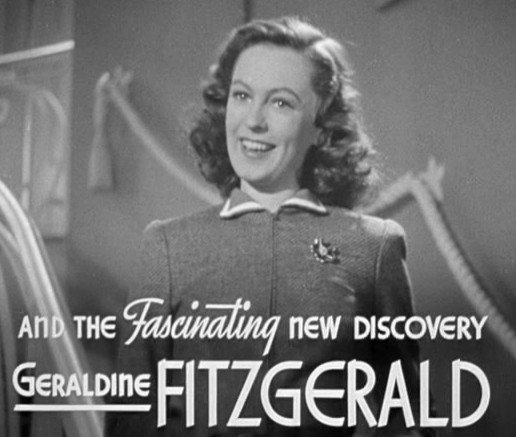
Dark Victory (1939), Fitzgerald's first American film

Fitzgerald's success led her to New York and the Broadway stage in 1938. She made her American debut opposite Orson Welles in the Mercury Theatre production of Heartbreak House. Hollywood producer Hal B. Wallis saw this production and subsequently signed her to a contract with Warner Bros. She had two significant successes in 1939: a role in the Bette Davis film Dark Victory and an Academy Award nomination for her supporting performance as Isabella Linton in William Wyler's Wuthering Heights.

She then appeared in Shining Victory (1941), The Gay Sisters (1942), and Watch on the Rhine (1943) for Warner Bros. and in Wilson (1944) for 20th Century Fox, but her career was hampered by her frequent clashes with studio management. She lost the role of Brigid O'Shaughnessy, villainess in The Maltese Falcon (1941), after such a clash with executive Jack L. Warner. Although she continued to work throughout the 1940s, co-starring with John Garfield in the Warner Bros. crime drama Nobody Lives Forever (1946), the quality of her roles began to diminish and her career lost momentum.

In 1946, shortly after completing work on Three Strangers, she left Hollywood to return to New York City, where she married her second husband, Stuart Scheftel, a grandson of Isidor Straus. She returned to Britain to film So Evil My Love (1948), receiving strong reviews for her performance as an alcoholic adultress, and The Late Edwina Black (1951) before returning to the United States. She became a naturalized United States citizen on April 18, 1955.

The 1950s provided her with few opportunities in film. However, during the 1960s she asserted herself as a character actor, and her career enjoyed a revival. Among her successful films during this period were Ten North Frederick (1958), The Pawnbroker (1964), and Rachel, Rachel (1968). Her later films included The Mango Tree (1977), for which she received an Australian Film Institute Best Actress nomination, and Harry and Tonto (1974), in a scene opposite Art Carney. In the comedy Arthur (1981) she portrayed Dudley Moore's wealthy and eccentric grandmother, even though she was only 22 years older than Moore. In 1983 she portrayed Rose Kennedy in the miniseries Kennedy, with Martin Sheen, and co-starred as Joanne Woodward's mother in the 1985 drama Do You Remember Love. Fitzgerald appeared in the 1983 Rodney Dangerfield comedy Easy Money, the horror film Poltergeist II: The Other Side (1986), and the comedy Arthur 2: On the Rocks (1988). In 1986 she starred alongside Tuesday Weld and River Phoenix in Circle of Violence, a television film about elder abuse.

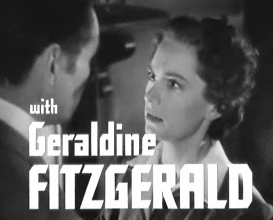
Trailer for Shining Victory (1941)

Fitzgerald returned to stage acting and won acclaim for her performance in the 1971 revival of Long Day's Journey Into Night. In 1976 she performed as a cabaret singer with the show Streetsongs, which played three successful runs on Broadway and was the subject of a PBS television special. She recorded an album of the show for Harbinger Records, produced by Bill Rudman and Ken Bloom and distributed by Ben Bagley's Painted Smiles Records. She also achieved success as a theatre director; in 1982, she became one of the first women to receive a Tony Award nomination for Best Direction of a Play for a production of Mass Appeal. While in New York, Fitzgerald collaborated with playwright and Franciscan brother Jonathan Ringkamp to found the Everyman Theater of Brooklyn, a street theater company. The company performed throughout the city, including at Ethical Culture and La MaMa Experimental Theatre Club. Their first performance took place at La MaMa in September 1972 with a production called Everyman at La MaMa. They then performed The Francis-Day, a musical about Francis of Assisi, at La MaMa in July 1973.

She appeared on television in such series as Alfred Hitchcock Presents, Robert Montgomery Presents, Naked City, St. Elsewhere, The Golden Girls, and Cagney and Lacey. She had a regular role in the short-lived 1965 CBS serial Our Private World. In 1987 she played a title role in the television pilot Mabel and Max, produced by Barbra Streisand. She received an Emmy Award nomination for a guest role playing Anna in The Golden Girls Mother's Day episode in 1988 and played a different character in the episode "Not Another Monday". She won a Daytime Emmy Award as best actress for her appearance in the NBC Special Treat episode "Rodeo Red and the Runaways". On February 8, 1960, Fitzgerald was recognized with a star on the Hollywood Walk of Fame at 6353 Hollywood Boulevard for her contributions to motion pictures.

== Personal life ==
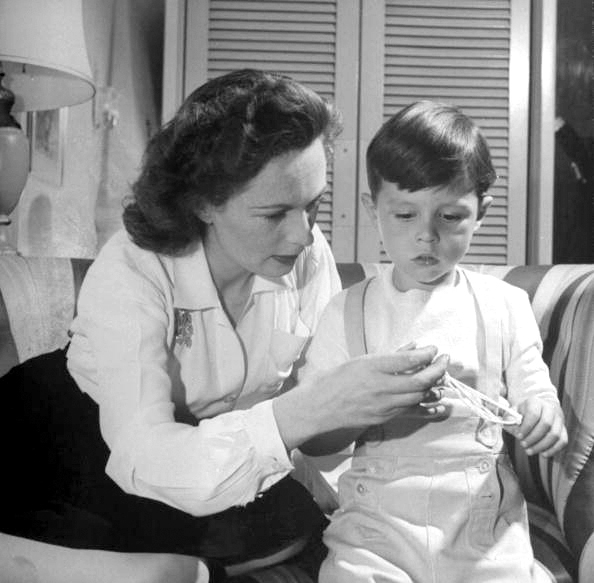
Geraldine Fitzgerald and son Michael Lindsay-Hogg aged 3 in 1944

Fitzgerald married Sir Edward Lindsay-Hogg, 4th Bt., in London on November 18, 1936. She was granted a divorce in Reno on August 30, 1946, after three years of separation. She had one son, director Sir Michael Lindsay-Hogg, with Edward and a daughter, Susan Scheftel, during her second marriage to American businessman Stuart Straus Scheftel, grandson of Ida and Isidor Straus who perished in the sinking of the Titanic.

Her son's resemblance to Orson Welles, with whom she worked and was linked romantically in the late 1930s, led to rumors that Welles was his biological father. Fitzgerald never confirmed this to her son, but in his 2011 autobiography Lindsay-Hogg wrote that this question was resolved by his mother's close friend Gloria Vanderbilt, who had written that Fitzgerald told her that Welles was his father.

A 2015 biography of Welles by Patrick McGilligan argues that Welles' paternity is unlikely. Fitzgerald left the United States for Ireland in late May 1939, and her son was born in early May 1940, meaning that he was conceived before her return to the U.S. in late October. Welles did not travel overseas during that period.

English actress Tara Fitzgerald is Fitzgerald's great-niece.

== Death ==
Fitzgerald died at age 91 in New York City, following a long battle with Alzheimer's disease. She is buried in Woodlawn Cemetery, in The Bronx, next to her husband, Stuart Straus Scheftel.

== Acting credits ==
=== Film ===
Year	Title	Role	Notes
1934	Blind Justice	Peggy Summers	
1934	Open All Night	Jill	
1935	The Lad	Joan Fandon	
1935	Three Witnesses	Diana Morton	
1935	Department Store	Jane Grey	
1935	The Ace of Spades	Evelyn Daventry	
1935	Turn of the Tide	Ruth Fosdyck	
1935	Lieutenant Daring R.N.	Joan Fayre	
1936	Debt of Honour	Peggy Mayhew	
1936	Cafe Mascot	Moira O'Flynn	
1936	The Mill on the Floss	Maggie Tulliver	
1939	Wuthering Heights	Isabella	
1939	Dark Victory	Ann King	
1939	A Child Is Born	Grace Sutton	
1940	'Til We Meet Again	Bonny Coburn	
1941	Flight from Destiny	Betty Farroway	
1941	Shining Victory	Dr. Mary Murray	
1942	The Gay Sisters	Evelyn Gaylord	
1943	Watch on the Rhine	Marthe de Brancovis	
1944	Ladies Courageous	Virgie Alford	
1944	Wilson	Edith Bolling Galt	
1945	The Strange Affair of Uncle Harry	Lettie Quincey	
1946	Three Strangers	Crystal Shackleford	
1946	O.S.S.	Ellen Rogers / Elaine Duprez	
1946	Nobody Lives Forever	Gladys Halvorsen	
1948	So Evil My Love	Susan Courtney	
1951	The Late Edwina Black	Elizabeth	
1958	Ten North Frederick	Edith Chapin	
1961	The Fiercest Heart	Tante Maria	
1964	The Pawnbroker	Marilyn Birchfield	
1968	Rachel, Rachel	Reverend Wood	
1973	The Last American Hero	Mrs. Jackson	
1974	Harry and Tonto	Jessie	
1976	Echoes of a Summer	Sara	
1976	Diary of the Dead	Maud Kennaway	
1977	The Mango Tree	Grandma Carr	
1978	Bye Bye Monkey	Mrs. Toland	
1981	Arthur	Martha Bach	
1981	Lovespell	Bronwyn	
1982	Blood Link	Mrs. Thomason	
1983	Easy Money	Mrs. Monahan	
1986	Poltergeist II: The Other Side	Gramma-Jess	
1988	Arthur 2: On the Rocks	Martha Bach	

=== Television ===
Year	Title	Role	Notes
1951–1955	Robert Montgomery Presents	Elizabeth	6 episodes
1960	Shirley Temple's Storybook	Aunt Rosa	Season 2 Episode 13: "The Black Sheep"
1961	Alfred Hitchcock Presents	Elizabeth Burton	Season 6 Episode 24: "A Woman's Help"
1964	The Nurses	Nurse Carrie Bruno	Season 2 Episode 23: "For the Mice and the Rabbits"
1965	The Alfred Hitchcock Hour	Agatha Tomlin	Season 3 Episode 24: "Power of Attorney"
1970	The Best of Everything	Violet Jordan	114 episodes
1973	Me	Ma	TV movie (aka Untold Damage)
1975	NBC Special Treat	Ella McCune	
1977	The Quinns	Peggy Quinn	TV movie
1977	Yesterday's Child	Emma Talbot	TV movie
1983	Kennedy	Rose Kennedy	TV Miniseries
1985	Do You Remember Love	Lorraine Wyatt	TV movie
1986	Circle of Violence: A Family Drama	Charlotte Kessling	TV movie
1988–1989	The Golden Girls	Anna / Martha	2 episodes: "Mothers' Day" (1988) / "Not Another Monday" (1989)
1991	Bump in the Night	Mrs. Beauchamps	TV movie, (final film role)

=== Radio ===
Year	Program	Episode	Ref.
1941	Philip Morris Playhouse	Stage Door	

== Awards and nominations ==
Year	Award	Category	Work	Result	Ref.
1939	Academy Award	Best Supporting Actress	Wuthering Heights	Nominated	
1939	National Board of Review	Best Acting	Dark Victory / Wuthering Heights	Won	
1960	Hollywood Walk of Fame	Motion Picture Star	—N/a	Honored	
1975	Daytime Emmy Awards	Outstanding Individual Achievement in Children's Programming	NBC Special Treat	Won	
1982	Tony Award	Best Direction of a Play	Mass Appeal (1982)	Nominated	
1988	Primetime Emmy Awards	Outstanding Guest Actress in a Comedy Series	The Golden Girls (episode "Mother's Day")	Nominated	
