= This Green Hell =

- Edward Rigby and Sybil Grove in the film
- Directed by: Randall Faye
- Written by: Randall Faye
- Produced by: Randall Faye
- Starring: Edward Rigby; Sybil Grove; Richard Dolman
- Cinematography: Geoffrey Faithfull
- Production company: Randall Faye Productions
- Distributed by: RKO
- Release date: 31 August 1936
- Running time: 71 minutes
- Country: United Kingdom
- Language: English

This Green Hell is a 1936 British comedy film directed by Randall Faye and starring Edward Rigby, Sybil Grove and Richard Dolman. It was made at Nettlefold Studios in Walton-on-Thames as a quota quickie for release by the American company RKO.

== Plot ==
Presumed dead following a train crash, Dan Foyle is mourned by his family, but in reality he is very much alive. The accident has left him with amnesia that has erased his past life, allowing his dormant, adventurous explorer instincts to take full control. He is soon taken up by major publishing house and is catapulted to fame after writing a bestselling book about the wonders of Brazil's "Green Hell." However, trouble brews when his family recognizes him during a broadcast, and then tracks him down. The story concludes with Dan forced to maintain his false identity, even though his memory has fully returned.

== Cast ==
- Edward Rigby as Dan Foyle
- Sybil Grove as Mrs. Foyle
- Richard Dolman as Andy
- Roxie Russell as Peggy Foyle
- John Singer as Billy Foyle
- Billy Watts as Barton
- Norman Pierce as Willington

== Reception ==
Kine Weekly wrote: "An unpretentious production which nevertheless has an ingenious and well-acted plot dealing with the exploits of a fake explorer. Ii strikes a novel note, is human in the outlook, and is well stocked with natural humour."

The Daily Film Renter wrote: "Here is an out-of-the-ordinary picture that might possibly have been a good deal better had it been directed with more imagination."

Picturegoer wrote: "It is a very human little story with an underlying touch of pathos. It is unpretentious, but I can readily believe if more time and money had been spent on it it could have been a really outstanding production. As it is it is pleasantly entertaining and well worth making a note of."

== Bibliography ==
- Low, Rachael. Filmmaking in 1930s Britain. George Allen & Unwin, 1985.
- Wood, Linda. British Films, 1927-1939. British Film Institute, 1986.
