= Kathleen Kelly (actress) =

British actress (born 1912)

- Born: 9 December 1912 (age 113); United Kingdom
- Occupation: Actress
- Years active: 1932-1939 (film & TV)

Kathleen Kelly (born 9 December 1912) was a British stage and film actress of the 1930s. Her date and year of death are unknown.

== Filmography ==
- Once Bitten (1932)
- Designing Women (1934)
- Dangerous Ground (1934)
- What Happened to Harkness? (1934)
- Oh, What a Night (1935)
- The Deputy Drummer (1935)
- Lend Me Your Wife (1935)
- Foreign Affaires (1935)
- Mother, Don't Rush Me (1936)
- Strange Cargo (1936)
- The Avenging Hand (1936)
- The Scarab Murder Case (1936)
- Heart's Desire (1936)
- The Dominant Sex (1937)
- The Mutiny of the Elsinore (1937)
- Who Killed John Savage? (1937)
- The Live Wire (1937)
- Little Miss Somebody (1937)
- Bad Boy (1938)
- The Mysterious Mr. Davis (1939)

== Bibliography ==
- Goble, Alan. The Complete Index to Literary Sources in Film. Walter de Gruyter, 1999.
