= Francis Carver =

British cinematographer

- Born: 9 June 1907; Birmingham; United Kingdom
- Died: 1986 (aged 78–79)
- Occupation: Cinematographer

Francis Carver (9 June 1907 – 1986) was a British cinematographer.

== Selected filmography ==
- The Village Squire (1935)
- Lucky Days (1935)
- Cross Currents (1935)
- Love at Sea (1936)
- House Broken (1936)
- Chick (1936)
- Talk of the Devil (1936)
- Pay Box Adventure (1936)
- Two on a Doorstep (1936)
- Ticket of Leave (1936)
- Cross My Heart (1937)
- Lancashire Luck (1937)
- The Last Curtain (1937)
- Night Ride (1937)
- Missing, Believed Married (1937)
- Mr. Smith Carries On (1937)
- The Minstrel Boy (1937)
- Millions (1937)
- Incident in Shanghai (1938)
- A Spot of Bother (1938)
- Kicking the Moon Around (1938)
- Lightning Conductor (1938)
- The Lambeth Walk (1939)
- The Silver Darlings (1947)

== Bibliography ==
- Low, Rachael. History of the British Film: Filmmaking in 1930s Britain. George Allen & Unwin, 1985 .
