= Richard Dolman =

British actor (1895–1978)

- Born: 30 November 1895; Kensington, London, United Kingdom
- Died: 3 February 1978 (aged 82); Englefield Green, Surrey, United Kingdom
- Other name: Frederick William Dolman
- Occupation: Actor
- Years active: 1932 - 1937 (film)

Richard Dolman (November 30, 1895 – February 3, 1978) was a British stage and film actor. He worked frequently in musical theatre, appearing in Noël Coward's revue On with the Dance in 1925, and alongside Jessie Matthews in the 1927 revue One Dam Thing After Another. He also featured in Oscar Hammerstein's 1934 musical Three Sisters. Dolman appeared in nine films, often playing romantic leads in releases such as the Ealing Studios comedy Looking on the Bright Side.

== Filmography ==
- Looking on the Bright Side (1932)
- The Good Companions (1933)
- The Man Who Changed His Name (1934)
- Lucky Loser (1934)
- Love on the Spot (1934)
- Southern Roses (1936)
- This Green Hell (1936)
- King of Hearts (1936)
- The Lilac Domino (1937)

== Bibliography ==
- Green, Stanley. Encyclopedia of the Musical Theatre. Da Capo Press, 2009.
- Hischak, Thomas S. The Rodgers and Hammerstein Encyclopedia. ABC-CLIO, 2007.
