= Two on a Doorstep =

- Directed by: Lawrence Huntington
- Written by: George Barraud; Gerald Elliott; Donovan Pedelty
- Produced by: Anthony Havelock-Allan
- Starring: Kay Hammond; Harold French; Anthony Hankey; George Mozart
- Cinematography: Francis Carver
- Production company: British & Dominions
- Distributed by: Paramount British Pictures
- Release date: May 1936
- Running time: 71 minutes
- Country: United Kingdom
- Language: English

Two on a Doorstep is a 1936 British comedy film directed by Lawrence Huntington and starring Kay Hammond, Harold French and Anthony Hankey. It was written by George Barraud, Gerald Elliott and Donovan Pedelty, and made at Rock Studios, Elstree as a quota quickie for release by the American company Paramount Pictures.

== Preservation status ==
The British Film Institute National Archive holds a collection of ephemera and stills but no film or video materials.

== Plot ==
Jill Day and her brother Peter are in debt. Bailiff Jimmy Blair arrives at their flat to collect what's owed, and takes pity on Jill. He suggests she capitalises on the fact that her telephone number is often mistaken for that of Day's the bookmakers, and start taking bets.

== Cast ==
- Kay Hammond as Jill Day
- Harold French as Jimmy Blair
- Anthony Hankey as Peter Day
- George Mozart as George
- Dorothy Dewhurst as Mrs Beamish
- Frank Tickle as Mr Beamish
- Walter Tobias as Diggle
- Ted Sanders in a bit part

== Reception ==
The Monthly Film Bulletin wrote: "The dialogue is full of cheerful modern idiom and the two interests of money and love are carefully interwoven so that each strengthens the other."

Kine Weekly wrote: "Although this picture is based on the hazards of betting, it is very tame stuff. There is far too much pretty-pretty romance, clumsily expressed in tiresome talk, and all too few visits to the racecourse and dog track. In making a bid for masculine as well as feminine appeal the film misses both badly and lands far beyond the pale of good popular entertainment. ... Kay Hammond and Harold French make a very colourless pair as Jill and Jimmy respectively; as amateur bookmakers they have far more luck than they deserve."

The Daily Film Renter wrote: "Confected and artificial story, developed in leisurely fashion and containing excess of dialogue. Dog and horse racing scenes best features of poor subject, affording quota support for the uncritical. ... There is not enough substance to the plot to justify over 6,000 feet, and on more than one occasion it looks as if the picture is in danger of premature decease owing to lack of material. The whole thing is on the level of a novelette, and the adventures of Jill and Jimmy are really not sufficiently exciting to persuade one to take much interest in them."
