= Eric Cross (cinematographer) =

English cinematographer

- Born: 31 May 1902; London, United Kingdom
- Died: 1 March 2004 (aged 101); Middlesex, United Kingdom
- Occupation: Cinematographer

Eric Cross (31 May 1902 in London – 1 March 2004 in Middlesex) was an English cinematographer.

== Selected filmography ==
- The Flaw (1933)
- The Lure (1933)
- Money for Speed (1933)
- On Thin Ice (1933)
- The Laughter of Fools (1933)
- The Way of Youth (1934)
- Death Drives Through (1935)
- Song of Freedom (1936)
- The Bank Messenger Mystery (1936)
- Strange Cargo (1936)
- Make-Up (1937)
- Splinters in the Air (1937)
- Mr. Reeder in Room 13 (1938)
- Ships with Wings (1941)
- The Man at the Gate (1941)
- The Black Sheep of Whitehall (1942)
- Don't Take It to Heart (1944)
- Chance of a Lifetime (1950)
- The Dark Man (1951)
- Hunted (1952)
- Private Information (1952)
- Escape Route (1952)
- Glad Tidings (1953)
- Death Goes to School (1953)
- Tiger by the Tail (1955)
- Fun at St. Fanny's (1956)
- Private's Progress (1956)
- The One That Got Away (1957)
- The Man Who Liked Funerals (1959)
- Deadly Record (1959)
- Tiger Bay (1959)
- Inn for Trouble (1960)
- Crosstrap (1962)
