= Full Speed Ahead (1936 film) =

- Directed by: Lawrence Huntington
- Written by: Gerald Elliott; Lawrence Huntington
- Produced by: Lawrence Huntington
- Starring: Paul Neville; Moira Lynd; Richard Norris; George Mozart
- Cinematography: Stanley Grant
- Production company: Lawrence Huntington Productions
- Distributed by: Paramount Pictures
- Release date: November 1936
- Running time: 71 minutes
- Country: United Kingdom
- Language: English

Full Speed Ahead (also known as Shipping Drama and Full Steam Ahead) is a 1936 British drama film directed by Lawrence Huntington and starring Paul Neville, Moira Lynd and Richard Norris. It was written by Gerald Elliott and Huntington, and made at Wembley Studios as a quota quickie for distribution by the Hollywood company Paramount Pictures.

== Synopsis ==
A couple elope on a ship, only to discover that the dishonest captain plans to scuttle it for insurance purposes.

== Cast ==
- Paul Neville as Captain Murton
- Moira Lynd as Jean Hunter
- Richard Norris as Tim Brent
- George Mozart as Chief Smith
- Geoffrey Clark as Dunn
- Victor Hagen as Smith
- George Turner as Oily Short
- Arthur Seaton as Irving Hunter
- Julian Vedey as Mendoza
- Syd Crossley as Muggridge
- Arthur Brander as Alec Goodhill
- Dorothy Dewhurst as Mrs. Meddlecott
- Frederick Peisley as Michael Elwood

== Reception ==
Kine Weekly wrote: "This British picture is a little too ingenuous to excite the sophisticated but it should have no difficulty in entertaining the majority in a supporting feature capacity. Thanks to reasonably good characterisation the motivating spirit of adventure secures adequate recognition, the comedy relief shows up well in contrast with the rough stuff, and much of the atmosphere is authentic."

The Monthly Film Bulletin wrote: "The acting all round is good and the excitement well sustained. The captain's method of keeping order by punching a man's face, although suitably villainous, becomes monotonous."

The Daily Film Renter wrote: "Highlight is use of authentic ocean locale, complete with tramp schooner, interior studio shots being exceptionally well matched up. ... While this is basically an unpretentious offering, the producer has gone to great pains to ensure the requisite atmosphere, genuine shipboard locations being prominently featured. ... Paul Neville takes the honors as Murton, never overdoing a role that might have tempted an actor to rant."
