= Lawrence Huntington =

British film director, screenwriter, producer (1900–1968)

Lawrence Huntington (9 March 1900 – 1968) was a British film director, screenwriter and producer.

Huntington was born in London on 9 March 1900, he directed more than thirty films following his debut feature After Many Years (1930). He later worked in television before his death in 1968. His work on TV included directing Douglas Fairbanks Presents.

== Partial filmography ==
- After Many Years (1930)
- Romance in Rhythm (1934)
- Cafe Mascot (1936)
- The Bank Messenger Mystery (1936)
- Two on a Doorstep (1936)
- Strange Cargo (1936)
- Full Speed Ahead (1936)
- Passenger to London (1937)
- Twin Faces (1937)
- Dial 999 (1938)
- I Killed the Count (1939)
- This Man Is Dangerous (1941)
- Tower of Terror (1941)
- Suspected Person (1942)
- Women Aren't Angels (1943)
- Warn That Man (1943)
- Night Boat to Dublin (1946)
- Wanted for Murder (1946)
- When the Bough Breaks (1947)
- The Upturned Glass (1947)
- Mr. Perrin and Mr. Traill (1948)
- Man on the Run (1949)
- The Franchise Affair (1951)
- Deadly Nightshade (1953)
- There Was a Young Lady (1953)
- Contraband Spain (1956)
- Deadly Record (1959)
- A Question of Suspense (1961)
- The Fur Collar (1962)
- Stranglehold (1963)
- Death Drums Along the River (1963)
- The Vulture (1967)
