= Love at Sea (1936 film) =

- Opening titles
- Directed by: Adrian Brunel
- Written by: Jane Browne; Beaufoy Milton
- Produced by: Anthony Havelock-Allan
- Starring: Rosalyn Boulter; Carl Harbord; Aubrey Mallalieu; Frank Birch
- Cinematography: Francis Carver
- Production company: British & Dominions Film Corporation
- Distributed by: Paramount British Pictures
- Release date: April 1936
- Running time: 70 minutes
- Country: United Kingdom
- Language: English

Love at Sea is a 1936 British comedy film directed by Adrian Brunel and starring Rosalyn Boulter, Carl Harbord and Aubrey Mallalieu. It was written by Jane Browne and Beaufoy Milton.

== Plot ==
A woman travelling on a cruise ship falls in love with a suspected thief on board.

== Cast ==
- Rosalyn Boulter as Betty Foster
- Carl Harbord as Dick Holmes
- Aubrey Mallalieu as John Brighton
- Frank Birch as Mr. Godwin
- Dorothy Dewhurst as Mrs. Hackworth Pratt
- Maud Gill as Emily Foster
- Beatrix Fielden-Kaye as Katherine Foster
- Billy Bray as Slippery Joe
- George Merritt as Inspector

== Production ==
During production a major fire broke out at British and Dominions Elstree Studios where the film was being shot. Brunel moved production to the nearby Rock Studios and managed to complete the film on time.

== Reception ==
The Monthly Film Bulletin wrote: "Matrimonial magazines provide abundant material for comedy-romance, and perhaps also for tragedy, but the success of that material when cast in the shape of a film depends entirely on the treatment. At the best, it could provide bright social satire, as this film might have, but with neither 'flip' nor purpose it is apt to be boringly tiresome, the middle-aged pair (who, of course, get tangled up with a young pair) setting a slow tempo and a rather dowdy tone. Rosalynd Boulter works hard to inject life into the film and succeeds for her own part. But the rest conspires to defeat her and the film stolidly declines to be anything but complicated."

Kine Weekly wrote: "Rosalyn Boulter is attractive as Betty but Carl Harbord is somewhat stilted as Dick. Aubrey Mallalien is good as Brighton, and Maud Gill is well in characier as the sweet-natured Emily. As her sister, Beatrix Felden-Kave tends to overact. ... The complications are involved but, as a whole, the plot is amusing, and strikes an original note. Individual scenes are well directed."
