= Find the Lady (film) =

Find the Lady may refer to one of the following three films:

- Find the Lady (1936 film), a British comedy starring Jack Melford, Althea Henley and George Sanders
- Find the Lady (1956 film), a British comedy featuring Donald Houston, Beverley Brooks and Mervyn Johns
- Find the Lady (1976 film), an American comedy starring John Candy
