= Lucille Lisle =

Australian actress (1908–2004)

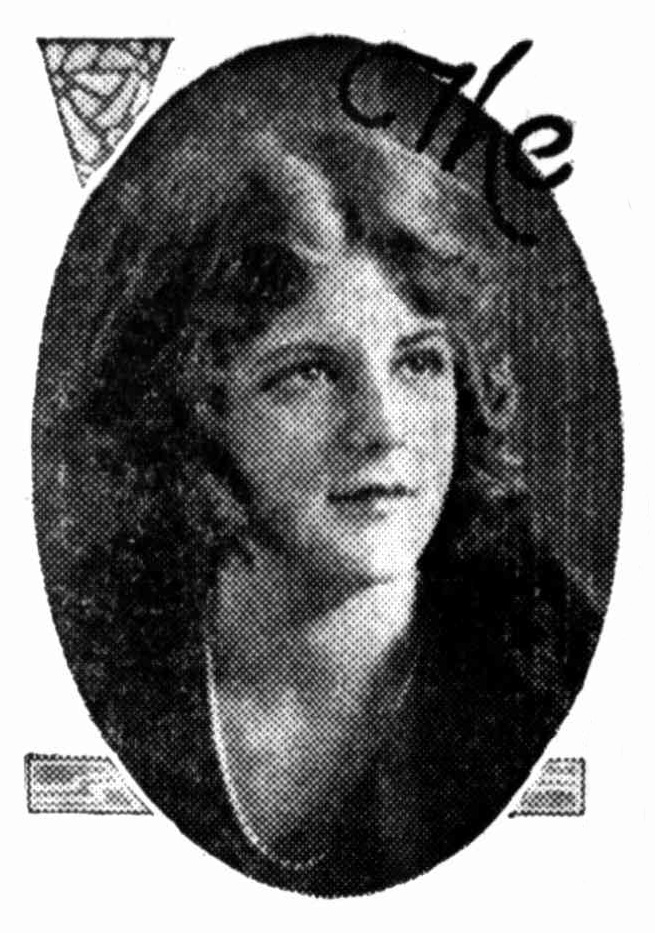
- Lucille Lisle, photograph published in 1926.
- Born: 16 May 1908; Melbourne; Australia
- Died: 23 September 2004 (aged 96); Tunbridge Wells, Kent; United Kingdom
- Occupations: Stage, film and radio actor
- Years active: 1924–1958

Lucille Lisle (1908–2004) was an Australian actress. She began her stage career aged eight and continued to appear as an actor and dancer throughout her childhood. She had been cast in two silent films and was performing as a dancer in revue shows by age seventeen. In the following years Lisle took on acting roles in Australian productions and joined a touring comedy company. In 1930 she departed for America and found moderate success in New York and touring productions. In 1932 Lisle left New York for London, where she eventually found success in the theatre in several long-running West End productions. During the 1930s she was cast in six films made in the United Kingdom. During the war years and afterwards Lisle mainly focussed on radio drama.

== Biography ==
=== Early years ===
Lucille Lisle was born Lucille Hunter Jonas in the suburb of Richmond, Melbourne, on 16 May 1908, the only child of David Henry Jonas and Caroline (née Hunter). Her mother had been an actress and dancer, known as Cissie Hunter, who was associated with John F. Sheridan's Musical Comedy Company in the early 1900s, touring Australia and South Africa. Soon after Lucille's birth the family moved to Sydney where her father worked as a company manager.

Lucille attended the Kincoppal School at the Sacred Heart Convent in Rose Bay. She received her secondary education at St. Vincent's College at Potts Point.

Lucille made her stage debut in 1916, aged eight, as a dancer in the pantomime Dick Whittington at the Princess Theatre in Melbourne. When she was ten years old, as Miss Lucille Jonas, she appeared in Eyes of Youth starring Emélie Polini. In 1919 Lucille appeared in a dramatised prologue, staged prior to the film Daddy Long Legs (starring Mary Pickford) at the Lyceum Theatre in Sydney. In the following years she appeared in a number of pantomimes and charity events, encouraged and supported by her mother. For a period in the early 1920s Lucille was a pupil of Mary MacNichol, a drama teacher and elocutionist.

=== Stage career ===
By 1924, aged sixteen, Lucille was using the stage name of Lucille Lisle. She was cast as 'Margie' in a comedy silent film Hullo Marmaduke, featuring the English comedian Claude Dampier and written and directed by Beaumont Smith. The film was released in November 1924. Lisle was cast as 'Olive Lennox' in Painted Daughters, directed by F. Stuart Whyte and released in May 1925. The film, described as "a romantic melodrama about high society and the flapper generation", was successful at the box-office.

From September 1925 Lisle performed as one of the six Australian Tivoli girls (also referred to as the "Beauty Ballet"), selected in a competition, as part of Maurice Diamond and "his big girl show" at the Tivoli theatres in Sydney and Melbourne. During 1926 Lisle was in the chorus of the musical comedy Katja which played in Sydney, Brisbane and Melbourne. In October 1926 she successfully auditioned for the lead female role as 'Phyllis' in a production of John Galsworthy's Old English at King's Theatre in Melbourne. Lisle was a cast member of J.C. Williamson's pantomime Aladdin, that commenced its season at Sydney's Grand Opera House in late December 1926.

From April 1927 Lisle was a supporting cast member in The Cradle Snatchers, a popular American farce comedy. In a company featuring touring English and American actors, Lisle played 'Anne Hall', described as "an ingénue role". The production played successful seasons in Sydney, Melbourne, Adelaide and Brisbane until early in 1928.

From about August 1928 to early 1929 Lisle toured with Maurice Moscovich's company of actors as understudy to Bertha Riccardo in The Silent House. Moscovitch's son, 'Nat' Madison, was also in the play. In February 1929 Lisle was playing alongside Ashton Jarry in a dramatic sketch at the Tivoli Theatre in Melbourne. In March 1929 Nat Madison made his debut on the vaudeville stage at the Tivoli in a one-act play titled You Can't Beat Them ("a comedy dealing with the domestic side of life in a flat"), playing alongside both Lisle and Riccardo.

In May 1929 Lisle joined the American Comedy Company formed by Benjamin and John Fuller. She was cast as "the spoilt and impulsive Lydia" in the "farcical comedy" The Baby Cyclone, first performed in Australia at Sydney's St. James Theatre and during August 1929 at the Empire Theatre in Brisbane. During September 1929 the company presented a production of Saturday's Children at the Empire, with Lisle in the cast. During October and November the American Comedy Company performed The Baby Cyclone and Whispering Friends in Perth and later in Adelaide.

In December 1929 Lisle was one of eighteen performers of the American Comedy Company travelling by the steamer ship Manuka from Melbourne to Dunedin in New Zealand. In thick fog on the night of 16 December the vessel struck rocks at Long Point, south of Dunedin. All the passengers and crew were able to get to shore by lifeboats, but their personal belongings and cargo was lost (including the company's scenery and costumes). Despite the disaster the company were able to perform as advertised, opening at Dunedin's Princess Theatre on Boxing Day 1929 with a production of The Family Upstairs, with replacement scenery and costumes brought from Wellington.

In May 1930 Lucille Lisle and her mother departed for the United States aboard the SS Sonoma.

=== New York ===
After arriving in America Lisle and her mother lived in Hollywood for ten weeks, staying with Nat Madison and his wife. Lucille had worked on stage with Madison in Australia. During her time in Hollywood Lisle performed in a series of short films made by Brown-Nagel Productions.

In New York Lisle was cast in a play written by Kenyon Nicholson titled Stepdaughters of War, about female ambulance drivers in the British army who served during World War I. The production opened at the Empire Theatre on Broadway in October 1930 and closed after twenty-four performances. In early 1931 Lisle performed in the comedy Art and Mrs. Bottle, in a touring production of US and Canadian east coast cities. In November 1931 Lisle was a cast member of A Widow in Green at the Cort Theatre in Manhattan. In March 1932 she was cast in a revival of Alice Sit-By-The-Fire (written by J. M. Barrie), at the Playhouse Theatre on Broadway.

Lucille Lisle and her mother left New York for England in July 1932.

=== Britain ===
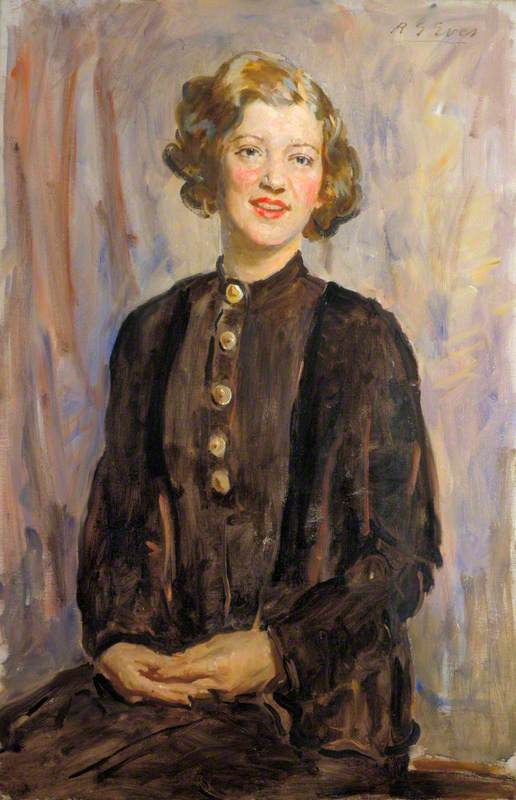
Portrait of Lucille Lisle by Reginald Grenville Eves (1930s).

After arriving in London Lisle found work as the understudy for Edna Best in the play Another Language, written by Rose Franken, at the Lyric Theatre. In about February 1933 Best left the production "for family reasons" and the actress chosen as her replacement, Celia Johnson, was unable to take up the engagement until a week later. Lisle, as the understudy, "got her big chance in the meantime, and attracted much attention because of her creditable performance".

Lisle was cast in the film After Dark directed by Albert Parker, a 'quota quickie' filmed at Nettleford Studios at Walton-on-Thames and released in Britain in January 1933.^{[A]}

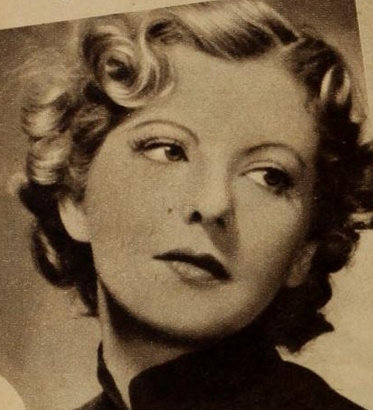
Portrait of Lucille Lisle, detail from an advertisement for Lux Toilet Soap, published in Picturegoer Weekly, 20 November 1937.

In 1933 Lisle was cast in a lead role, as the young ingénue 'Susan Haggett', in the comedy drama The Late Christopher Bean, an English adaptation of a French play. The play opened at the St James's Theatre in London in May 1933 and ran for 488 performances.

By March 1935 Lisle was cast in Lady Precious Stream, the successful play based on Chinese folklore written by Hsiung Shih-I, at the Little Theatre in London. During 1935 she played the part of 'Marian Steele', one of the leading roles in the film Expert's Opinion directed by Ivar Campbell, a 'quota quickie' made at Elstree Studios for release by the British subsidiary of Paramount Pictures (released in November 1935).

Lisle had a leading role in Twice Branded, a prison melodrama film directed by Maclean Rogers and released in May 1936. She also had a leading role in Midnight at Madame Tussaud's, directed by George Pearson and filmed during 1936. In about July 1936 Lisle replaced Jessica Tandy as 'Anna' in a production of Anthony and Anna at London's Whitehall Theatre. In total Anthony and Anna ran for 750 performances, closing in October 1937, with Lisle in a leading role for its final fifteen months. Lisle played the role of 'Angela' in the film The Minstrel Boy, released in Britain in September 1937.

In March 1938 Lisle was in the cast of Marcia Gets Her Own Back performed by the Repertory Players. From June 1938 she was cast in the farce comedy Sexes and Sevens which played at Newcastle and the Vaudeville Theatre in London.

In November 1938 Lisle was chosen for the part of 'Maria' in Michel Saint-Denis' production of Shakespeare's Twelfth Night at the Phoenix Theatre in London's West End. The critic for London's Daily Telegraph praised her performance, writing: "She made a notable Maria, and was lively and clear-spoken". The production of Twelfth Night was filmed by the BBC and broadcast in January 1939.

At London's Richmond Theatre Lisle performed in a production of Behind the Curtain in April 1939 and had a leading role in Juggernaut in May 1939. She joined the BBC repertory company in 1940 with which she was associated for the following five years.

On 24 February 1942 at Tewkesbury, county Gloucestershire, Lucille Lisle married Lieutenant Nicholas Harris, a Royal Navy officer and son of Sir Percy Harris, the Liberal member of parliament for Bethnal Green. The couple had a son named Antony, born in 1943.

During the war years Lisle's performances were confined to radio drama, which she continued to perform in until her retirement in 1958.

During the 1950s Lisle played roles in several television series made by the BBC: the character of 'Mary Bold' in The Warden (1951, three episodes) and 'Mrs. Cholmondley' in Villette (1957, three episodes). In 1958 she played 'Mrs. Farrington' in The Sound of Death, part of The Vise television series, an anthology of filmed plays produced by Danziger Productions Ltd.

=== Later years ===
Lucille Lisle (Harris) died on 23 September 2004, aged 96, at Burrswood Hospital, Tunbridge Wells in county Kent, England.

== Selected filmography ==
- Hullo Marmaduke (1924) Beaumont Smith's Productions (Australia; silent)
- Painted Daughters (1924) Union Theatres and Australasian Films (Australia; silent)
- After Dark (1932) Fox Film Company (UK)
- Expert's Opinion (1935) British and Dominions Film Corporation (UK)
- Twice Branded (1936) George Smith Productions (UK)
- Midnight at Madame Tussaud's (Midnight at the Wax Museum) (1936) Premier Sound Films (UK)
- The Minstrel Boy (The Melody Maker) (1937) Sidney Morgan Productions (UK)
- Special Edition (1938) Redd Davis Productions (UK)

== Radio ==
- The Dark Tower (1946)

== Notes ==
A.In 1927 the British parliament passed the Cinematograph Films Act, which came into force in April 1928. The Act, intended as a counter to the perceived economic and cultural dominance of Hollywood films, imposed a minimum quota of British films to be shown in British cinemas. One of the consequences of the legislation was the proliferation of inexpensive productions in order for distributors and exhibitors to conform to the legal requirements of the Act. The low-budget British-made films, usually shown as a supporting movie to the featured film, became known as 'quota quickies'. These films were often looked upon with disdain and considered to be cheap and tawdry. The producer Michael Balcon commented: "For many people 'a British film' became the rubbishy second feature you had to sit through, or avoid, if you went to see a Hollywood movie".
