= Mr Stringfellow Says No =

1934 film by Randall Faye

Mr. Stringfellow Says No
- Claude Dampier and Neil Hamilton in the film
- Directed by: Randall Faye
- Screenplay by: Randall Faye; Brandon Fleming
- Produced by: Brandon Fleming; Reginald Gottwaltz
- Starring: Claude Dampier; Neil Hamilton; Muriel Aked
- Cinematography: Ernest Palmer
- Production company: Shepperton Studios
- Release date: 1937
- Running time: 76 minutes
- Country: United Kingdom
- Language: English

Mr Stringfellow Says No (also known as Accidental Spy) is a 1937 British thriller film directed by Randall Faye and starring Neil Hamilton, Claude Dampier and Muriel Aked. It was written by Faye and Brandon Fleming.

== Plot ==
An innocent bystander, who is given a vital secret which he doesn't hear, is hounded by all countries until the Prime Minister bluffs them by pretending that he knows the secret too.

== Cast ==
- Neil Hamilton as Jeremy Stringfellow
- Claude Dampier as Mr Piper
- Muriel Aked as Mrs Piper
- Kathleen Gibson as Miss Piper
- Marcelle Rogez as Marta
- Franklin Dyall as Count Hokana
- Peter Gawthorne as Prime Minister

== Reception ==
The Monthly Film Bulletin wrote: "This should have been either a roaring farce or a bitter satire, whereas it is only mildly amusing and the thrills never get across. We never believe in the important secret and so cannot think that Jeremy is ever in serious danger. The best parts are the domestic comedy scenes between Claude Dampier and Muriel Aked as Jeremy's prospective in-laws."

Kine Weekly wrote: "Comedy espionage drama, unpretentious in presentation but novel in theme. The plot seldom sides with realism, but it has several diverting offshoots and they converge as it develops into quite good popular entertainment."

Picturegoer wrote: "What almost appears to be a burlesque spy story in which the captain of the Boys' Brigade finds himself through a chain of circumstances involved in international affairs. It can hardly be said that the most has been made of a somewhat promising situation, but Neil Hamilton does what he can with the material he is given as the gallant captain. Claude Dampier scores a laugh or two as a hen-pecked husband, and Peter Gawthorne is very good as the Prime Minister who eventually has to take a hand in the affair. Two good studies come from Franklyn Dyall and Muriel Aked."

Picture Show wrote: "This is a thoroughly entertaining and most original satire on spy melodrama. ... The film is full of action and hilarious sequences, in which satirical fun is made of political circles, established traditions, and politicians themselves, while the scenes in the Tower are delicious."
