= Bathia Howie Stuart =

New Zealand actor (1893–1987)

Bathia Howie Stuart (1893–1987) was a notable New Zealand actor, singer, journalist, lecturer, film-maker and tourism promoter. She was born in Hastings, Hawke's Bay, New Zealand in 1893. She starred in the silent movie The Adventures of Algy alongside Claude Dampier.
