= Scruff =

Scruff may refer to:

- Scruff (anatomy), a loose, non-sensitive area of skin by which a mother can carry her young
- Scruff (app), a mobile application for gay men
- Scruff (TV series), a Spanish children's animated television series
- Scruff Connors (1952–2016), Canadian radio broadcaster
- Mr. Scruff (born 1972), British DJ and artist

== See also ==
- Scruffy (disambiguation)
- The Scruffs
