= Howard Petrie =

American actor (1906–1968)

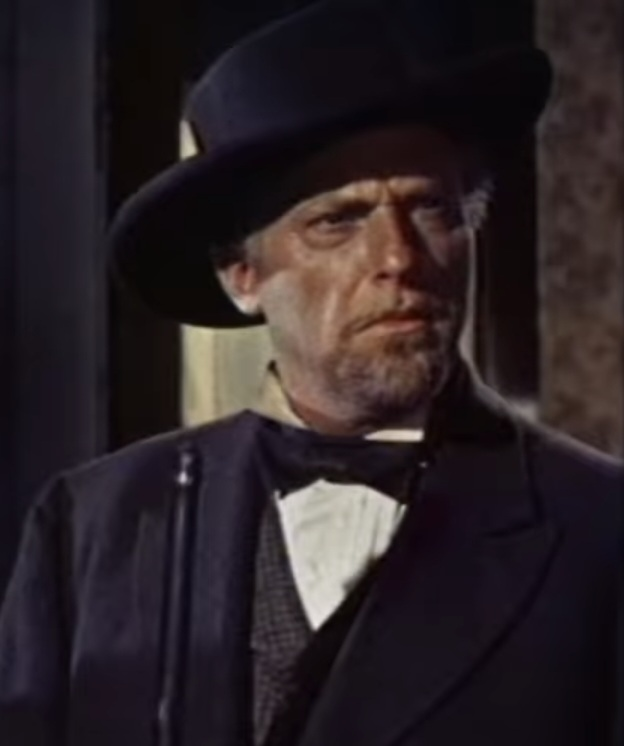
- Petrie in Rage at Dawn (1955)
- Born: Howard Alexander Petrie; November 22, 1906; Beverly, Massachusetts, U.S.
- Died: March 24, 1968 (aged 61); Keene, New Hampshire, U.S.
- Resting place: Worcester Rural Cemetery, Worcester, Massachusetts
- Occupation: Actor
- Years active: 1929–1965
- Spouse: Alice Wood (m. 1933)
- Children: 1

Howard Alexander Petrie (November 22, 1906 – March 24, 1968) was an American radio, television, and film actor.

== Early life ==
Howard Petrie was born in Beverly, Massachusetts on November 22, 1906. When Howard was three years old his family moved to Concord. The Petries later lived in Arlington and then Somerville, where Petrie received his secondary school education. A talented musician, he conducted his high school glee club and played with various instrumental groups. He was a member of the debating team, a captain in the School Regiment and Chairman of the Senior Night Committee. He appeared in school dramatic productions including a starring role as "Marquis de la Seigliere" in the senior class play and the Jules Sandeau three-act comedy, Mademoiselle de la Seigliere.

== Radio career ==
After he graduated from Somerville High School in 1924, Petrie worked briefly as a bank clerk and a securities salesman. While on a sales call to a radio station, his sonorous bass voice landed him a job. He joined WBZ Radio in Boston in 1929 as a junior announcer. After ten months at the WBZ studios, Petrie left for New York City in June, 1930 where he joined the staff of NBC.

Petrie soon became the head announcer for many of the network's shows. His first major network assignment was on Everything Goes, starring Garry Moore. He was the announcer for scores of shows including Abie's Irish Rose, Big Sister, Camel Caravan, Blondie, The Ray Bolger Show, The Judy Canova Show, The Jimmy Durante Show, and The Garry Moore Show.

In 1936, Petrie won the Batten, Barten and Durstine Award for Good Announcing. In 1942 he was the recipient of the H.P. Davis Memorial Announcers' Award for "personality, adaptability, diction, voice and versatility". He moved to California in 1943 to become the announcer for The Judy Canova Show. As a "personality announcer", he became a character in the show.

== Film and television career ==
In 1947, a movie producer who was looking for a tall man for a character role, saw Petrie on the radio stage and offered him the part. At 6 feet four (193 cm) and 240 pounds (109 kg), Petrie played numerous "big man" roles. He worked as a character actor in over thirty feature films and forty television shows. He often appeared in Westerns in both mediums. He played Sheriff Akers in "Wanted Dead or Alive" S2 E13 "No Trail Back" which aired 11/26/1959.

== Personal life ==
On April 21, 1933, Petrie married Alice Wood, whom he met when he worked at NBC, where she was a hostess between 1931 and 1936. She had been an actress. The Petries had one son.

== Later years and death ==
Howard Petrie had been living in semi-retirement at his home, Autumn Hill, in Walpole, New Hampshire, when he died in Keene, New Hampshire, on March 24, 1968. He was interred in Worcester Rural Cemetery, Worcester County, Massachusetts.

== Filmography ==
Film
Year	Title	Role	Notes
1947	The Hal Roach Comedy Carnival	George Baxter, in "Fabulous Joe"	
1947	The Fabulous Joe	George Baxter	
1950	Fancy Pants	Secret Service Man	Uncredited
1950	Walk Softly, Stranger	Bowen	
1950	Rocky Mountain	Cole Smith / California Beal	
1951	No Questions Asked	Franko	
1951	Cattle Drive	Cap	
1951	The Racket	The Governor	Uncredited
1951	The Golden Horde	Tugluk	Alternative title: The Golden Horde of Genghis Khan
1952	Bend of the River	Tom Hendricks	Alternative title: Where the River Bends
1952	The Wild North	Brody	
1952	Carbine Williams	Sheriff	
1952	Red Ball Express	Major General Lee Gordon	
1952	Woman of the North Country	Rick Barton	
1952	Pony Soldier	Insp. Frazer	
1953	Fair Wind to Java	Reeder	
1953	Trouble Along the Way	Marvin Adams	Uncredited
1953	Fort Ti	Maj. Rogers	
1953	The Veils of Bagdad	Karsh	
1954	Border River	Newlund	
1954	Seven Brides for Seven Brothers	Pete Perkins	
1954	The Bounty Hunter	Sheriff Brand	
1954	The Bob Mathias Story	Dr. Charles Mathias	
1954	Sign of the Pagan	Gundahar	
1955	Timberjack	'Axe-Handle' Ole	
1955	Rage at Dawn	Lattimore, Prosecuting Attorney	Alternative title: Seven Bad Men
1955	How to Be Very, Very Popular	Desk Sergeant	
1955	The Return of Jack Slade	Joseph Ryan	
1956	The Maverick Queen	Butch Cassidy	
1956	A Kiss Before Dying	Howard Chesser, Chief of Police	
1956	Johnny Concho	Joe Helguson, Blacksmith	
1957	The Tin Star	Mayor Harvey King	
Television
Year	Title	Role	Notes
1954	Waterfront	Hugh Perry	1 episode
1955	The Ford Television Theatre	Baker	1 episode
1956	Gunsmoke	Abe Brant	1 episode "Yorky"
1957	Broken Arrow	Sam Carson	1 episode
1957	Letter to Loretta	Scoutmaster	1 episode
1957	Casey Jones	George Newsome	1 episode "Dark Rider"
1958	The Californians	Stryker	1 episode
1958	Alcoa Theatre	Lieutenant Gifford	1 episode
1958	Cheyenne	Burt Wrangel	1 episode "Wagon-Tongue North"
1959	Frontier Justice	Kroll	1 episode
1959	Bonanza	Major Ormsby	1 episode
1959	Lawman	Hal Mead	1 episode
1959	Maverick	Mike Burke	1 episode
1959	Colt .45	John Porter	1 episode
1959	The DuPont Show with June Allyson	Abbott	1 episode
1959	Wanted: Dead or Alive	Sheriff Akers	Episode: "No Trail Back"
1960	Shotgun Slade	Major Kennedy	1 episode
1960	Wanted: Dead or Alive	Sam Pryor	Episode: "Angela"
1960	M Squad	Mr. Patrick - Head of heist team	1 episode
1960	Have Gun – Will Travel	Jack Foster	S3 E23 "Lady on the Wall"
1960	Mr. Lucky	John Dort	1 episode
1960	Johnny Ringo	Ed Blanchard	1 episode
1960	Bat Masterson	Hugh Blaine	4 episodes
1960	The Life and Legend of Wyatt Earp	Governor Gibbs	2 episodes
1960	Bronco	Rigby	1 episode
1960	Hennesey	Admiral Wright	1 episode
1960	Peter Gunn	Lockland	1 episode
1960	The Tom Ewell Show	Paul Wilkins	Episode: "The Spelling Bee"
1960	Rawhide	Abner Carter	S2:E28, "Incident of the Murder Steer"
1960–1962	Death Valley Days	Joseph Hooker	2 episodes, (final appearance)
1961	National Velvet	Bjorensen	1 episode
1961	The Many Loves of Dobie Gillis	Col. McCurdy	1 episode
1961	Rawhide	Hunneker	S3:E11, "Incident of the Broken Word"
1964–1965	The Edge of Night	Otto Zimerman	Unknown episodes
