= I Live Again =

1936 musical film by Arthur Maude

- Trade advertisement
- Directed by: Arthur Maude
- Written by: John Quin
- Produced by: G.B. Morgan
- Starring: Noah Beery; Bessie Love
- Cinematography: Horace Wheddon
- Production company: G.B. Morgan Productions
- Distributed by: National Provincial Film Distributors
- Release date: November 1936
- Running time: 74 minutes
- Country: United Kingdom
- Language: English

I Live Again (alternate title: Live Again) is a 1936 British musical film directed by Arthur Maude and starring Noah Beery, Bessie Love, and John Garrick. It was written by John Quin, and made at Rock Studios, Elstree.

== Preservation status ==
The British Film Institute National Archive holds a collection of stills but no film or video materials.

== Plot ==
An aging opera star takes on a young protege.

== Cast ==
- Noah Beery as Morton Meredith
- Bessie Love as Kathleen Vernon
- John Garrick as John Wayne
- Vi Kaley as Jane Bloggs
- Stan Paskin as Joshua Bloggs
- Cecil Gray as Vivian Turnbull
- Pamela Randall as Grace Felton
- Lynwood Roberts as Major Cannon
- Frank Stanmore as Magistrate

== Reception ==
Kine Weekly wrote: "Bewhiskered musical melodrama, entertainment far too old-fashioned in story and acting technique, sentiment and dialogue to appeal to other than very unsophisticated audiences. ... All the emotions are paraded in this picture, but the method of their introduction is so crude and antiquated that the film drifts from the obvious to something dangerously approaching bathos."

The Daily Film Renter wrote: "Presented on old-fashioned lines, this production has a highly theatrical story, together with acting of a transpontine quality. ... the plot is outmoded stuff, while the stilted acting of most of the cast does little to make it acceptable. Dialogue is often unintentionally funny, and the situations distinctly creaky."
