= The Minstrel Boy (film) =

1937 film

- Fred Conyngham and Chili Bouchier the film
- Directed by: Sidney Morgan
- Written by: Joan Morgan; Sidney Morgan
- Produced by: Sidney Morgan
- Starring: Fred Conyngham; Chili Bouchier; Lucille Lisle
- Cinematography: Francis Carver
- Edited by: Cecil H. Williamson
- Music by: Percival Mackey
- Production company: Dreadnought Films
- Distributed by: Butcher's Film Service
- Release date: September 1937
- Running time: 79 minutes
- Country: United Kingdom
- Language: English

The Minstrel Boy (also known as The Melody Maker) is a 1937 British musical film directed by Sidney Morgan and starring Fred Conyngham, Chili Bouchier and Lucille Lisle. It was written by Morgan and Joan Morgan, and made at the M.P. Studios in Elstree. It takes its title from the popular song "The Minstrel Boy".

== Preservation status ==
The British Film Institute National Archive holds a collection of ephemera and stills but no film or video materials.

== Plot ==
Angela Shelley marries dance band leader and singer Mike, who performs as "Mike The Minstrel Boy." Angela soon realises that the Bohemian party world Mike inhabits is not to her liking. When she finds Mike dallying with old flame Dee Dawn, she leaves him. Losing Angela, Mike gradually goes downhill. Angela saves him from suicide.

== Cast ==
- Fred Conyngham as Mike
- Chili Bouchier as Dee Dawn
- Lucille Lisle as Angela Shelley
- Kenneth Buckley as Austin Ravensbourne
- Basil Langton as Ed
- Marjorie Chard as Lady Ravensbourne
- Mabel Twemlow as Lady Pont
- Grenville Darling as Pat
- Xenia & Boyer as themselves
- Ronald Waters
- Pat Kavanagh

== Reception ==
The Monthly Film Bulletin wrote: "The direction is patchy. The sequences depicting Mike's life at the night club and with Angela go with a swing; those showing Angela's aristocratic background, in an effort to achieve a contrast of quiet dignity, succeed only in being stilted and ponderous."

Kine Weekly wrote: "It is obviously aimed at the masses and, with its popular story formula, song number and title, just as obviously hits the target. ... Fred Conyngham sings effectively and acts adequately in the role of Mike. Chili Bouchier vamps convincingly and puts over her song numbers expertly as De Dawn, but Lucille Lisle is inclined to be stilted as Angela."
