= If I Were Rich (1936 film) =

- Kay Walsh, Jack Melford and Clifford Heatherley in the film
- Directed by: Randall Faye
- Written by: Brandon Fleming
- Based on: play by Horace Annesley Vachell
- Produced by: Randall Faye
- Starring: Jack Melford; Kay Walsh; Clifford Heatherley; Minnie Rayner
- Cinematography: Geoffrey Faithfull
- Production company: Randall Faye Productions
- Distributed by: RKO Pictures
- Release date: May 1936
- Running time: 59 minutes
- Country: United Kingdom
- Language: English

If I Were Rich is a 1936 British comedy film directed by Randall Faye and starring Jack Melford, Kay Walsh and Clifford Heatherley. It was written by Brendon Fleming based on the play Humpty-Dumpty by Horace Annesley Vachell.

== Preservation status ==
The British Film Institute National Archive holds no stills or ephemera, and no film or video materials.

== Plot ==
When Albert Mott, a socialist barber, inherits an earldom, he abandons his political principles and embraces the upper-class life. However he soon tires of his new status, and flees back to his barber shop, where he learns that he is in fact the son not of the deceased Earl, but of Puttick, the Earl's butler.

== Cast ==
- Jack Melford as Albert Mott
- Kay Walsh as Chrissie de la Mothe
- Clifford Heatherley as General de la Mothe
- Minnie Rayner as Mrs. Mott
- Henry Carlisle as Puttick
- Frederick Bradshaw as Jack de la Mothe
- Ruth Haven as Nancy
- Quentin McPhearson as Higginbotham

== Production ==
The film was made at Nettlefold Studios as a quota quickie for release by RKO Pictures.

== Reception ==
The Monthly Film Bulletin wrote: "A comedy with several well-tried comic situations but lacking in fundamental good taste. ... The film will amuse those who take it at its surface value."

Kine Weekly wrote: "Once upon a time the story of this farce was funny, but to-day its gibes at all phases of society are too feeble and old fashioned to give cause for honest laughter. An odd situation here and there is amusing, but taken all round the entertainment is decidedly below par. Outside of small family halls the film's chances of meeting with approbation are, to say the least, slender."

The Daily Film Renter wrote: "Jack Melford extracts a satisfactory amount of comedy from his part of the bewildered Albert, and Kay Walsh makes the General's daughter an engaging baggage. The stock parts of autocratic butler, pompous general and homely mother are ably taken by Henry Carlisle, Clifford Heatherley: and Minnie Rayner. Humour never riotous, but usually adequate."

Picturegoer wrote: "The plot of this farce is so thin and out-moded that the artistes find great difficulty in making even mediocre entertainment of it. ... Staging is fair and direction is adequate, but it would have taken a Lubitsch to put new life into such old bones."

Picture Show wrote: "A comedy best suited to unsophisticated tastes... The dialogue is not too amusing, and the situations lack pep. Competently acted. Fair entertainment."
