= Expert's Opinion =

1935 film

- Leslie Perrins, Lucille Lisle and Kim Peacock in the film.
- Directed by: Ivar Campbell
- Written by: Ivar Campbell; Sheila Campbell
- Produced by: Anthony Havelock-Allan
- Starring: Lucille Lisle; Leslie Perrins; Franklyn Bellamy
- Production company: British and Dominions
- Distributed by: Paramount British Pictures
- Release date: November 1935
- Running time: 71 minutes
- Country: United Kingdom
- Language: English

Expert's Opinion is a 1935 British thriller film directed by Ivar Campbell and starring Lucille Lisle, Leslie Perrins and Franklyn Bellamy. It was written by Campbell and Sheila Campbell and was made at Elstree Studios as a quota quickie for release by the British subsidiary of Paramount Pictures. A group of foreign spies attempt to steal the plans for a new weapon.

== Preservation status ==
The British Film Institute National Archive holds a collection of ephemera and stills but no film or video materials.

== Plot ==
Jay and Kay Frost are entertainers with a novelty shooting act, and in one fateful performance, Jay is shot dead. Kay is accused of the killing, but she is acquitted on the basis of evidence given by arms expert Richard Steele. Later, when Steele designs a new machine-gun, his assistant Desmond, working for foreign spies, tricks Steele's wife Marian into revealing the plans. In a struggle to retrieve the plans Desmond is shot dead, and Marian is suspected. Kay falsely confesses to the shooting. It transpires that Jay, also a spy, was killed by Desmond.

== Cast ==
- Lucille Lisle as Marian Steele
- Leslie Perrins as Richard Steele
- John Kevan as Jay Frost
- Molly Fisher as Kay Frost
- Franklyn Bellamy as Keller
- Kim Peacock as Desmond Carter
- Lawrence Hanray as Coroner

== Reception ==
The Monthly Film Bulletin wrote: "The acting is of a high standard and the players are well-cast. The first court scene is well contrived, the lighting and camera angle lending interest to an otherwise trite episode."

Kine Weekly wrote: "The dramatic construction of the play is a trifle haphazard, the turning points in the development are far from convincing, but plenty of action, plus sound character-drawing, gives rise to sufficient excitement for the film to be turned into passable entertainment for the not too sophisticated. ... The production side is very good, cabaret scenes and aerial thrills bring variety to the development, but the methods employed by the villain to secure the formula, and those of the wife to retrieve it, are far from convincing. However, although the plot will not bear close inspection, it is not lacking in excitement."

The Daily Film Renter wrote: "This rather rambling story never manages to crystallise into a coherent whole. ... It is all quite complicated at times, while the long arm of coincidence is unduly overworked."
