= Special Edition (film) =

- Directed by: Redd Davis
- Written by: Derek Neame; Katherine Strueby
- Produced by: Redd Davis
- Starring: Lucille Lisle; John Garrick; Norman Pierce
- Cinematography: Roy Fogwell
- Production company: Redd Davis Productions
- Distributed by: Paramount British Pictures
- Release date: March 1938
- Running time: 68 minutes
- Country: United Kingdom
- Language: English

Special Edition is a 1938 British thriller film directed by Redd Davis and starring Lucille Lisle, John Garrick and Norman Pierce. It was written by Derek Neame and Katherine Strueby, and made by at Isleworth Studios as a quota quickie for release by Paramount British Pictures.

== Preservation status ==
The British Film Institute National Archive holds a collection of ephemera and stills but no film or video materials.

== Synopsis ==
A reporter investigates a murder case, and proves that a photographer is really a killer.

== Cast ==
- Lucille Lisle as Sheila Pearson
- John Garrick as Frank Warde
- Norman Pierce as Aiken
- Johnnie Schofield as Horatio Adams
- Frederick Culley as Dr. Pearson
- Vera Bogetti as Mrs. Howard
- Mabel Twemlow as Mrs. Cavendish
- Vincent Holman as Inspector Bourne
- Dino Galvani as Toni Lang
- Fewlass Llewellyn as coroner

== Reception ==
The Monthly Film Bulletin wrote: "The plot is good and clearly set forth, is leisurely worked out and arrives at a satisfactory conclusion. The identity of the murderer is well hidden."

Kine Weekly wrote: "Cut-to-pattern murder-cum-newspaper melodrama which has most of the familiar features of its type. Plot is somewhat wordily narrated, but has fair thrill and mystery content, and picture should do all right in second-feature spot at popular halls."

Picturegoer wrote: "Coventional who-done-it murder story ... There is the usual dumb policeman and red-herring trails. Development is slow and there is an over-plus of dialogue. John Garrick is fair as the reporter, as is Lucille Lisle as the heroine."
