= Riding High (1937 film) =

- Directed by: David MacDonald
- Screenplay by: H. Fowler Mear
- Produced by: George King
- Starring: Claude Dampier; John Garrick; Kathleen Gibson; Helen Haye
- Cinematography: Hone Glendinning
- Edited by: John Seabourne Sr.
- Music by: Kennedy Russell
- Production company: Embassy Pictures
- Distributed by: British Lion Films
- Release date: 1937
- Running time: 68 minutes
- Country: United Kingdom
- Language: English

Riding High (also known as Remember When) is a 1937 British comedy film directed by David MacDonald and starring Claude Dampier, John Garrick, Kathleen Gibson and Helen Haye. It was written by H. Fowler Mear and made at Shepperton Studios.

== Plot ==
In 1880 in the village of Wakeham a bicycle race is to be held. There are two entrants of note: local blacksmith Tom Blake, eager to try out his new invention, the "safety cycle", and George Davenport、steward to lady of the manor Miss Broadbent. Davenport needs the prize money to cover up the deficit left by his embezzling. Blake and Davenport are also rivals in love – for the hand of Grace Meadows, the ward of Miss Broadbent. When Miss Broadbent's solicitor Septimus Earwicker lets slip that Blake has a new invention, Davenport has it vandalised. But Blake is able to build a new one in time for the race, and his machine, ridden by Earwicker, wins.

== Cast ==
- Claude Dampier as Septimus Earwicker
- Helen Haye as Miss Ada Broadbent
- John Garrick as Tom Blake
- Kathleen Gibson as Grace Meadows
- John Warwick as George Davenport
- Billy Merson as Popping
- Mae Bacon as Mrs. Winterbottom
- Peter Gawthorne as Sir Joseph Wilmot
- Billy Holland as Jack Adamson
- Billy Bray as Ted Rance
- Aileen Latham as Fanny
- The Georgian Singers as minstrel singers
- Mansell & Ling as banjo duet
- Bertie Kendrick as boy vocalist
- Mike Johnson as mayor
- John Singer as Simon
- H. Victor Weske

== Reception ==
The Monthly Film Bulletin wrote: "This simple and naive story follows conventional lines. Its entertainment values are derived from its burlesque of contemporary social life and incidental amusing – if irrelevant – detail. ... Claude Dampier is in great form. His gags are funny, if occasionally vulgar, and his absurd but laughable manner as ridiculous as ever. Helen Haye makes an effective and dignified lady of the manor, and is a sane and humorous element in a somewhat fantastic world."

Kine Weekly wrote: "It has in the eccentricities and quaint customs and manners of the period novel material for humour. The director is not, however, always equal to the wealth and opportunity, but between its bright and flat spots it marks up safe popular comedy entertainment. Incidentally, versatile as the cast is, fancy dress is the biggest aid to laughs. Staging is excellent. Novel light booking for the masses."
