= Such Is Life (1936 film) =

- Trade advertisement
- Directed by: Randall Faye
- Written by: Brandon Fleming
- Produced by: Brandon Fleming; Reginald Gottwaltz
- Starring: Gene Gerrard; Claude Dampier; Jean Colin
- Cinematography: Geoffrey Faithfull
- Music by: Eric Spear
- Production company: Incorporated Talking Films
- Distributed by: National Provincial Film Distributors
- Release date: 1936
- Running time: 80 minutes
- Country: United Kingdom
- Language: English

Such Is Life (also known as Music and Millions) is a 1936 British comedy film directed by Randall Faye and starring Gene Gerrard, Claude Dampier and Jean Colin. It was written by Brandon Fleming, and made at Shepperton Studios.

== Plot ==
While visiting a fashionable restaurant, young millionaire Jack Rayner strikes up a conversation with a typist named Betty Blair. She spins grand tales about her immense wealth and high social standing, but vanishes before Jack can arrange a proper date. Their chat inspires Jack with a newfound ambition to actually work for a living. By a twist of fate, he lands a job at the same office as Betty. From then on, the pair are caught in a web of mutual suspicion, each convinced the other is a liar. Ultimately, Jack secures Betty's affections by purchasing a variety agency and giving Betty her big break performing in a cabaret.

== Cast ==
- Gene Gerrard as Jack Rayner
- Claude Dampier as Green
- Jean Colin as Betty Blair
- Eve Gray as Vicky
- Frank Birch as Mockett
- MacArthur Gordon as Chapman
- Aubrey Mallalieu as Sallust
- Paul Sheridan as Mandeville
- Billie Carlisle as secretary

== Reception ==
Kine Weekly wrote: "The high spirited nonsense of this picture leads to a happy blending of humour and romance, and sparkle is applied to the situations through the wide variety of the backgrounds. Some of the quips are a little near the mark, but the attractive personalities of the principal players and their experience prevent the joke from ever going too far. Taking all in all, the film is good, popular entertainment."

The Daily Film Renter wrote: "All too often revues resolve themselves into costumes, settings, and a lack of talent. Such Is Life, however, combines lavish trimmings and genuine, and sometimes novel, talent in most departments, Everything slides over as smoothly and brightly as a third glass of champagne."
