= Channel Crossing =

1933 British film by Milton Rosmer

- Theatrical release poster
- Directed by: Milton Rosmer
- Written by: Cyril Campion; W. P. Lipscomb
- Produced by: Ian Dalrymple; George Gunn; Angus MacPhail
- Starring: Matheson Lang; Constance Cummings; Anthony Bushell; Nigel Bruce
- Cinematography: Philip Tannura
- Edited by: Daniel Birt
- Music by: Jack Beaver; Louis Levy
- Production company: Gaumont British Picture Corporation
- Distributed by: Woolf & Freedman Film Service
- Release date: 16 October 1933
- Running time: 70 minutes
- Country: United Kingdom
- Language: English

Channel Crossing is a 1933 British crime film directed by Milton Rosmer and starring Matheson Lang, Constance Cummings, Anthony Bushell and Nigel Bruce. It was written by Cyril Campion and W. P. Lipscomb.

== Plot ==
Jacob Van Eeden is a financer who has recently committed a forgery. He is secretly in love with his secretary Marion Slade, although she is engaged to Peter Bradley. Peter discovers the forgery and Van Eeden throws Peter overboard. Van Eeden realises Marion loves Peter, so arranges Peter's rescue and then commits suicide.

== Cast ==
- Matheson Lang as Jacob Van Eeden
- Constance Cummings as Marion Slade
- Anthony Bushell as Peter Bradley
- Dorothy Dickson as Vi Guthrie
- Nigel Bruce as Nigel Guthrie
- Edmund Gwenn as Trotter
- Douglas Jefferies as Dr. Walkley
- H.G. Stoker as Captain R.H. Kilbee
- Max Miller as James
- Viola Lyel as singer
- Clare Greet as anxious passenger
- Ellen Pollock as actress
- Mignon O'Doherty
- George Ridgwell
- Gerald Barry as passenger
- Stanley Vilven
- Hay Plumb as Steward
- Cyril Smith as Beach
- Elizabeth Corcoran
- Elizabeth Jenns
- Rodney Millington
- Henry Hepworth as boy
- John Hepworth as boy
- Ronnie Hepworth as boy
- Bernard Miles as passenger
- Wally Patch as sailor
- C. Denier Warren as Purser
- Michael Wilding as passenger boarding ferry
- Sam Wilkinson as passenger

== Production ==
Emil Jannings was sought for the lead role. This part was also promised to Conrad Veidt but he lost it after reportedly making supportive comments about Hitler. Matheson Lang was signed in May 1933 when the film had begun filming second unit. It was shot partly on location and at the Lime Grove Studios in Shepherd's Bush. The film's sets were designed by the art director Alfred Junge.

== Reception ==
The Daily Film Renter wrote: "Straightforward narrative with sufficient comedy and human interest. Strong 'heavy' performance by Matheson Lang, and delightful portrayal by Constance Cummings. Max Miller also exceptionally funny in own inimitable patter interludes. Picturesque shots of Dover cliffs and Channel, and atmosphere delightfully illustrated. Sound popular offering of light calibre."

Kine Weekly wrote: "The staging of this film is really quite good, the atmosphere is convincing, and the cast contains a string of well-known names, but there is one fundamental weakness, the story. This piece of artless fiction, on the lines of Rome Express has no near relation to reason or reality, nor is it strong in dramatic values. The entertainment lies mainly in the by-play and detail, and the box-office angles in the intriguing title and the strength of the cast."

Variety wrote: "It’s none too original, but fast enough and with pace – practically a new element in British films. New at any rate, since prior to Rome Express which, incidentally, is recalled in this film by several incidents. Matheson Lang as the financier turns in a polished and colorful performance, and Constance Cummings as the secretary is not far behind, except that she doesn’t have nearly as much to do."
