= Kathleen Gibson =

British actress (1915–1974)

- Born: Kitty Stride; 5 April 1915; West Ham, London, England
- Died: 1 January 1974 (aged 58); Paddington, London, England
- Occupation: Actress
- Years active: 1934–1940

Kathleen Gibson (born Kitty Stride, 1915–1974) was a British actress who developed her craft in repertory theatre. In 1932, Gibson played one of the friends of the character D'Recamier (Pearl Argyle) in the Frederick Ashton ballet "Magic Nights".

Gibson was discovered by C. B. Cochran, who made her one of Cochran's Young Ladies. On 30 November 1933, she played Ena Hawkins in a production of Mr. Whittington at the Alhambra Theatre, Glasgow, starring alongside Jack Buchanan. A review published in The Stage in December 1933 said that Gibson "looks pretty in the part of Ena and performs some very neat dancing". The show went on tour and included some weeks at the London Hippodrome Theatre. This led to a film contract.

Gibson died in Paddington, London in 1974.

== Filmography ==
- Mr Stringfellow Says No (1934)
- Born That Way (1936)
- The Last Rose of Summer (1937)
- The Heirloom Mystery (1937)
- Cross My Heart (1937)
- Bells of St. Mary's (1937)
- Remember When (1937)
- The High Command (1937)
- Riding High (1937)
- The Good Old Days (1940)
