= Coming of Age (1938 film) =

1938 British film by H. Manning Haynes

- Directed by: Manning Haynes
- Written by: Rowan Kennedy; Paul White
- Produced by: A. George Smith
- Starring: Eliot Makeham; Joyce Bland
- Cinematography: Sydney Blythe
- Production company: George Smith Productions
- Distributed by: Columbia Pictures Corporation (UK)
- Release date: March 1938 (UK)
- Running time: 68 minutes
- Country: United Kingdom
- Language: English

Coming of Age is a 1938 British comedy film directed by H. Manning Haynes and starring Eliot Makeham and Joyce Bland. The supporting cast features Evelyn Ankers. In this farce, a husband and wife grow restless and find themselves having affairs.

== Cast ==
- Eliot Makeham as Henry Strudwick
- Joyce Bland as Isobel Strudwick
- Jack Melford as Roger Squire
- Ruby Miller as Julia Knight
- Jimmy Hanley as Arthur Strudwick
- Evelyn Ankers as Christine Squire
- Annie Esmond as Mrs. Crowther
- Aubrey Mallalieu as Mr. Myers

== Critical reception ==
TV Guide gave the film two out of five stars, calling it an "Okay comedy...Some good character actors save this one from obscurity."
