= Luck of the Turf =

1936 film

- Wally Patch, Jack Melford and Moira Lynd in the film
- Directed by: Randall Faye
- Written by: John Hunter
- Produced by: Randall Faye
- Starring: Jack Melford; Moira Lynd; Wally Patch; Moore Marriott
- Cinematography: Geoffrey Faithfull
- Production company: Randall Faye Productions
- Distributed by: RKO Pictures (US); Mist Entertainment (UK)
- Release date: September 1936
- Running time: 64 minutes
- Country: United Kingdom
- Language: English

Luck of the Turf (also known as Gay Reality) is a 1936 British comedy film directed by Randall Faye and starring Jack Melford, Moira Lynd, Wally Patch and Moore Marriott. It was written by John Hunter, and made at the Nettlefold Studios in Walton as a quota quickie for release by the Hollywood studio RKO Pictures.

== Plot summary ==
Young newspaper shopkeeper Sid Smith's hobby is the study of racing form and, not being a betting man himself, he picks winners for his friends. His fiancée Letty's parents abhor gambling and will not allow them be married until Sid has enough savigs to buy a better business. When he suddenly receives an offer for his shop, the chance for new premises, and free tickets to Goodwood Racecourse, he goes to the races and gambles away nearly all his funds. Now in a desperate situation, on a hunch he puts his last £10 on a horse with 50-to-1 odds. It wins.

== Cast ==
- Jack Melford as Sid Smith
- Moira Lynd as Letty Jackson
- Wally Patch as Bill Harris
- Moore Marriott as Mr Jackson
- Sybil Grove as Mrs Jackson
- Tom Helmore as Lord Broadwater
- Peggy Novak as Masie

== Reception ==
The Monthly Film Bulletin wrote: "Apart from the moral aspect of the theme this story is fairly amusing light entertainment. There is not a great deal of incident, but the picture of working class life is shown with homely humour and realistic touches. The race course scenes are authentic, and the settings generally are appropriate. The acting is adequate if not outstanding."

Kine Weekly wrote: "Slight romance of a man who has a hunch he can tip winners. There is quite a lot of humour and human sentiment in the domestic situations, and the story is adequately presented. The acting is good and the dialogue has several bright interludes."

The Daily Film Renter wrote: "Unpretentious story depends mainly on dialogue and domestic discord for humour, with mild sentimental appeal. Adequate settings of shop life and racing atmosphere, with technical qualities and portrayals to match. Suitable offering for popular halls."

== See also ==
- List of films about horses
- List of films about horse racing
