= Handle with Care (1935 film) =

- James Finlayson, Molly Lamont and Jack Hobbs in the film
- Directed by: Redd Davis
- Written by: Redd Davis; Randall Faye
- Produced by: Randall Faye; George King
- Starring: Molly Lamont; Jack Hobbs; James Finlayson
- Cinematography: Geoffrey Faithfull
- Production company: Embassy Films
- Distributed by: RKO
- Release date: 2 September 1935
- Running time: 59 minutes
- Country: United Kingdom
- Language: English

Handle with Care (also known as Look Out, Mr. Haggis) is a 1935 British comedy film directed by Redd Davis and starring Molly Lamont, Jack Hobbs and James Finlayson. It was written by Davis and Randall Faye, and was a quota quickie made at the Nettlefold Studios in Walton-on-Thames.

== Preservation status ==
The British Film Institute National Archive holds a collection of ephemera and stills but no film or video materials.

== Plot ==
Professor Deeping invents a formula for tablets that give the user immense physical strength, but the effects only last for two minutes. Count Paul Vacha arrives at the scientist’s country home, determined to steal the secret formula for a foreign government. Also lurking around the estate is Jack, a former crook hiding out from the police by masquerading as a fitness expert. When Jack is entered into a charity wrestling match against the Count, who happens to be a ju-jitsu champion, he panics. But after consuming one of the tablets, wins effortlessly.

== Cast ==
- Molly Lamont as Patricia
- Jack Hobbs as Jack
- James Finlayson as Jimmy
- Henry Victor as Count Paul
- Vera Bogetti as Fifi
- Margaret Yarde as Mrs. Tunbody
- Toni Edgar-Bruce as Lady Deeping
- Stafford Hilliard as Prof. Deeping

== Reception ==
Kine Weekly wrote: "Very weak farce indifferenty produced and acted. The humour is of a broad knockabout obvious nature, and the picture as a whole only suitable tor small industrial halls or for quota purposes."

The Daily Film Renter wrote: "Developed on lines of crude farce, the picture might have been better as a two-reeler. As it is, the story is definitely not of sufficient strength to stand up to the feature category."

Picturegoer wrote: "Rather feeble farce, indifferently produced and acted ... The dialogue is both profuse and poor and the humour is of the most obvious knock-about variety. Mollie Lamont, now essaying bigger and better things in Hollywood, has little to do but look decorative. Jimmie Finlayson is starved of material and Jack Hobbs is somewhat forced as the hero."

Picture Show wrote: "An extremely unfunny farce, overloaded with poor dialogue, and handicapped still further by mediocre direction and acting. ... Nothing much really matters, except the wrestling match, which is the only bright spot in the picture."
