= None But the Brave (play) =

1925 play

- Written by: Bernard Merivale; Brandon Fleming
- Original language: English
- Genre: Farcial melodrama

Premiere
- Date premiered: 1925

None But the Brave is a 1925 farcical melodramatic play by the British writers Bernard Merivale and Brandon Fleming in which a man inherits the estate of a wealthy uncle, and has to avoid being framed for murder by his relatives.

It enjoyed a West End run of 106 performances, beginning initially at the Garrick Theatre before transferring to the Royalty Theatre and then subsequently to the Haymarket Theatre.

== Bibliography ==
- Kabatchnik, Amnon. Blood on the Stage, 1925-1950: Milestone Plays of Crime, Mystery, and Detection : an Annotated Repertoire. Scarecrow Press, 2010.
- Wearing, J. P. The London Stage 1920-1929: A Calendar of Productions, Performers, and Personnel. Rowman & Littlefield, 2014.
