= The Perfect Lady =

1931 film

- Directed by: Frederick J. Jackson; Milton Rosmer
- Written by: Frederick J. Jackson
- Starring: Moira Lynd; Henry Wilcoxon; Reginald Gardiner
- Production company: British International Pictures
- Distributed by: Wardour Films
- Release date: November 1931
- Running time: 76 minutes
- Country: United Kingdom
- Language: English

The Perfect Lady is a 1931 British comedy film directed by Frederick J. Jackson and Milton Rosmer and starring Moira Lynd, Henry Wilcoxon and Reginald Gardiner. It was made at Elstree Studios by British International Pictures.

== Cast ==
- Moira Lynd as Anne Burnett
- Henry Wilcoxon as Larry Tindale
- Reginald Gardiner as Lord Tony Carderay
- Betty Amann as Jacqueline Dubarry
- Athene Seyler as Lady Westhaven
- Frederick Lloyd as Lord Westhaven

== Bibliography ==
- Low, Rachael. Filmmaking in 1930s Britain. George Allen & Unwin, 1985.
- Wood, Linda. British Films, 1927-1939. British Film Institute, 1986.
