= The Right Age to Marry =

1935 film by Maclean Rogers

- Frank Pettingell and Joyce Bland in the film
- Directed by: Maclean Rogers
- Written by: Kathleen Butler; H. F. Maltby
- Produced by: A. George Smith
- Starring: Frank Pettingell; Joyce Bland; Tom Helmore
- Cinematography: Geoffrey Faithfull
- Production company: George Smith Productions
- Distributed by: RKO Pictures
- Release date: 21 October 1935
- Running time: 69 minutes
- Country: United Kingdom
- Language: English

The Right Age to Marry is a 1935 British comedy film directed by Maclean Rogers and starring Frank Pettingell, Joyce Bland and Tom Helmore. It was written by Kathleen Butler, and H. F. Maltby, and made at Walton Studios as a quota quickie.

== Plot ==
Lomas Ramsden, a wealthy northern cotton mill owner, retires on his 50th birthday. Having worked hard 38 of those years, he wants to enjoy the pleasures he was denied as a youth. Jack Adams, a business associate Lomas dislikes, expects to succeed him, but instead Lomas chooses Stephen Barton, his 24-year-old nephew, who has been studying at Oxford. With his new job, he asks his girlfriend Carol to marry him. However, Lomas, a lifelong bachelor, demands he break off the engagement because Lomas wants him to devote himself to the business, not marriage. Though Stephen is his heir, Lomas threatens to disinherit him if he disobeys his order. Mrs. Carlisle, Carol's aunt, agrees wholeheartedly with Lomas, seeking his great wealth.

Lomas goes to a southern seaside resort and tries to move amongst the upper-classes. He engages a new housekeeper, one more knowledgeable of the upper class, surprising and disappointing Ellen, his longtime housekeeper. He is targeted by a gold digger, but comes to realize he is really in love with Ellen.

== Cast ==
- Frank Pettingell as Lomas Ramsden
- Joyce Bland as Ellen
- Ruby Miller as Mrs. Carlisle
- Tom Helmore as Stephen Barton
- Moira Lynd as Carol
- Hal Walters as Ted Crowther
- Vincent Holman as Bob Ingraham
- Reginald Bach as Jack Adams
- Isobel Scaife as Clara
- Gerald Barry as Major Locke
- H. F. Maltby as Tetley (uncredited)

== Reception ==
The Monthly Film Bulletin wrote: "There is some good acting by Frank Pettingell in this rather thin story, which has an over-sentimental ending. Screenwork: moderate."

Kine Weekly wrote: "Homely comedy-drama of North Country industrial life, cleverly written and flawlessly characterised. The story is based upon sound common sense, human interest is strong, the types, in which most of the entertainment is vested, are life-like, and the atmosphere and details are most convincing. Everything that matters finds its way into the picture, and each phase is proportionally represented through the resourcefulness of the direction. Very good popular booking, secure in its general and feminine appeal."
