= Hell's Cargo =

- American release poster
- Directed by: Harold Huth
- Written by: Léo Joannon (story); Dudley Leslie
- Produced by: Walter C. Mycroft
- Starring: Walter Rilla; Kim Peacock; Robert Newton
- Cinematography: Philip Tannura
- Edited by: Lionel Tomlinson
- Production company: Associated British Picture Corporation
- Distributed by: Associated British Film Distributors
- Release date: 16 November 1939
- Running time: 79 minutes
- Country: United Kingdom
- Language: English

Hell's Cargo is a 1939 British adventure film directed by Harold Huth and starring Walter Rilla, Kim Peacock and Robert Newton. It was written by Dudley Leslie from a story by Léo Joannon and was made at Elstree Studios. The film is a remake of the 1938 French hit Alert in the Mediterranean, and Peacock reprised his role as a Royal Navy Commodore from the earlier film. On its release in the United States it was retitled as Dangerous Cargo at the request of the Hays Office.

== Cast ==
- Walter Rilla as Cmndt. Lestailleur
- Kim Peacock as Cmdr. Falcon
- Robert Newton as Cmdr. Tomasou
- Penelope Dudley-Ward as Annette Lestailleur
- Geoffrey Atkins as Pierre Lestailieur
- Ronald Adam as Capt. Dukes
- Charles Victor as Mr. Martin
- Martin Walker as Dr. Laurence
- Henry Oscar as liner captain
- Henry Morell as Father Blanc
- Louise Hampton as Civil Defense warden

== Reception ==
The Monthly Film Bulletin wrote: "This spectacular and interesting story works up to a thrilling and breathtaking climax. It strikes a topical note with a timely warning. ... There is, in fact, no attempt made to penetrate below the surface of a melodramatic situation. The acting is uneven. Robert Newton is good as Tomasov; Walter Rilla adequate as Lesteilleur, but Kim Peacock is stiff and lifeless as Falcon. The settings are effective and the atmosphere convincing."

Kine Weekly wrote: "Robert Newton heads the acting honours list as the Russian commander; his is a fine piece of character drawing. Next best is Walter Rilla as the French officer; while last, and certainly least, is Kim Peacock as the British commander; he is very self-conscious. ... Story threads are quickly picked up, but although the initial scenes of national prejudices creating international friction are significant, it is the spectacular and heroic dash to save the passengers of a gas-menaced boat, which restores international harmony, that gives the melodrama its thrills and its cast-iron emotional appeal."

Picturegoer wrote: "No mention is made in the synopsis that this picture is a remake of the French film Alerte en Mediterranee ... I'm afraid this is very much of a carbon copy without the essential drive which makes the French picture memorable. ...The spectacular part of the picture is well done but there is an air of artificiality which precludes complete success."

Variety wrote: "Hell's Cargo is a kaleidoscopic story full of adventures at sea, with its characterizations admirably portrayed. A commendable production level for a vivid tale that spells success both here and in American duals. ... Robert Newton portrays the Russian with simplicity; Walter Rilla, as the French commander and Kim Peacock, representing Britain, are also fine along with Louise Hampton in a bit. Other support is adequate. Direction by Harold Huth is admirable, displaying a good eye particularly for character."
