= Randall Faye =

American screenwriter (1892–1948)

- Born: July 26, 1892
- Died: December 5, 1948 (aged 56); Orange County, California
- Occupation: Screenwriter
- Years active: 1926–1947

Randall Faye (July 26, 1892 – December 5, 1948) was an American screenwriter, film producer, and director. He wrote for 64 films between 1926 and 1947. He died in Orange County, California.

== Selected filmography ==
- Upstream (1927)
- Rich But Honest (1927)
- Sharp Shooters (1928)
- Don't Marry (1928)
- Woman Wise (1928)
- Branded (1931)
- Texas Cyclone (1932)
- McKenna of the Mounted (1932)
- High Society (1932)
- Her Imaginary Lover (1933)
- Call Me Mame (1933)
- As Good as New (1933)
- Cash (1933, producer)
- Murder at the Inn (1934)
- Father and Son (1934)
- The Office Wife (1934)
- Handle with Care (1935)
- Lend Me Your Husband (1935)
- The Man Without a Face (1935)
- Gay Old Dog (1935)
- Born That Way (1936)
- If I Were Rich (1936)
- Such Is Life (1936)
- The Vandergilt Diamond Mystery (1936)
- Luck of the Turf (1936)
- This Green Hell (1936)
- Mr Stringfellow Says No (1937)
- The Return of the Vampire (1943)
- Scotland Yard Investigator (1945)
- The Fabulous Suzanne (1946)
- The Ghost Goes Wild (1947)

As director

- Hyde Park (1934)
- Handle with Care (1935)
- The Vandergilt Diamond Mystery (1936)
- This Green Hell (1936)
- If I Were Rich (1936)
- Born That Way (1936)
- Luck of the Turf (1936)
- Such Is Life (1936)
- Mr. Stringfellow Says No (1937)
- Scruffy (1938)
