= Cyril Campion =

English playwright and screenwriter (1894–1961)

- Born: Cyril Theron Campion; 1894; St Giles, London, England
- Died: March 1961; Islington, London, England
- Occupation: Writer

Cyril Theron Campion (1894–1961) was an English playwright and screenwriter. He was the father of the actor Gerald Campion.

== Selected filmography ==
- Channel Crossing (1933)
- It's You I Want (1936)
- A Touch of the Moon (1936)
- Debt of Honour (1936)
- Convict 99 (1938)
- Discoveries (1939)

== Bibliography ==
- Landy, Marcia. British Genres: Cinema and Society, 1930-1960. Princeton University Press, 2014.
