= The Last Rose of Summer (1937 film) =

1937 film

- Directed by: James A. FitzPatrick
- Written by: James A. FitzPatrick; W.K. Williamson
- Produced by: James A. FitzPatrick
- Starring: John Garrick; Kathleen Gibson; Cecil Ramage
- Music by: Gideon Fagan
- Production company: FitzPatrick Pictures
- Distributed by: Metro-Goldwyn-Mayer
- Release date: September 1937
- Running time: 60 minutes
- Country: United Kingdom
- Language: English

The Last Rose of Summer is a 1937 British historical musical film directed by James A. FitzPatrick and starring John Garrick, Kathleen Gibson and Cecil Ramage. It was written by FitzPatrick and W.K. Williamson, based on the poem of the same name by Irish writer Thomas Moore, and made at Shepperton Studios as a quota quickie for distribution by Metro-Goldwyn-Mayer.

== Preservation status ==
The British Film Institute National Archive holds no stills or ephemera, and no film or video materials.

== Premise ==
The film depicts episodes in Moore's life including his friendship with Lord Byron.

== Cast ==
- John Garrick as Thomas More
- Kathleen Gibson as Thomas' sweetheart
- Malcolm Graham as Lord Byron
- Cecil Ramage
- Marian Spencer
- Meadows White

== Reception ==
The Daily Film Renter wrote: "Sincerity of direction and pleasing character portrayal of central figure by John Garrick compensate for absence of generally accepted standards of entertainment. Useful Quota footage for discerning patronage and specialised halls."

Kine Weekly wrote: "Sentimental drama based on incidents in the life of Thomas Moore, author of the song-poem that forms the title indicated. The production as a string of episodes rather than a story in the narrative sense."
