= There'll Always Be an England =

English patriotic song by Ross Parker and Hughie Charles

- Sheet music cover

Song by Vera Lynn
- Released: 1939
- Genre: Patriotic song
- Songwriters: Ross Parker, Hughie Charles

"There'll Always Be an England" is an English patriotic song, written and distributed in the summer of 1939, which became highly popular following the outbreak of the Second World War. It was composed and written by Ross Parker and Hughie Charles. It was recorded in 1939 by Billy Cotton and his Band (REX 9632), whose recording is mentioned on the original 1939 sheet music, and supplied him with a finale for his show for years. A popular version was later recorded by Vera Lynn in 1962.

== History ==
The song first appeared in Discoveries, a 1939 film by Carroll Levis, in which it was sung by the boy soprano Glyn Davies. After the Second World War broke out on 1 September, the song became popular and many records of it were made. Within the first two months of the war, 200,000 copies of the sheet music were sold. The song was used to express British patriotic defiance in the finale of Two Thousand Women, a successful 1944 film starring Phyllis Calvert and Patricia Roc about women interned by the Germans in occupied France. Vera Lynn did not record the song during the war years, but did release a version in 1962 (His Master's Voice CSD 1457).

Versions of the song were sung by Tiny Tim and the 1970 England World Cup Squad. The punk band The Sex Pistols came on stage to the tune in 2008. An instrumental version was the theme tune for Little Blighty on the Down, a BBC radio comedy series broadcast between 1988 and 1992 that satirised contemporary life in Britain.

== Content ==
In its lyrics, the song invokes various features of English rural and urban life. It is best known for its chorus:

There'll always be an England,
And England shall be free
If England means as much to you
As England means to me.

Its second verse also references the colours of the Union Jack, (Red, white and blue; what does it mean to you?") and the British Empire ("The empire too, we can depend on you").
