= Roaming Lady =

1936 film by Albert S. Rogell

- Directed by: Albert S. Rogell
- Written by: Diana Bourbon; Bruce Manning; Fred Niblo Jr.; Earle Snell
- Produced by: Sid Rogell; Robert North
- Starring: Fay Wray; Ralph Bellamy; Thurston Hall
- Cinematography: Allen G. Siegler
- Edited by: Otto Meyer
- Production company: Columbia Pictures
- Distributed by: Columbia Pictures
- Release date: May 2, 1936
- Running time: 66 minutes
- Country: United States
- Language: English

Roaming Lady is a 1936 American comedy action film directed by Albert S. Rogell and starring Fay Wray, Ralph Bellamy and Thurston Hall.

== Main cast ==
- Fay Wray as Joyce Reid
- Ralph Bellamy as Daniel S. 'Dan' Bailey
- Thurston Hall as E. J. Reid
- Edward Gargan as Andy
- Roger Imhof as Captain Murchison
- Paul Guilfoyle as Dr. Wong
- Tetsu Komai as General Fang
- Arthur Rankin as Blaney
- Gene Morgan as Tex
- Barnett Parker as Waters
- Harold Goodwin as Reid's Pilot
- William Gould as McLaughlin
- Robert Strange as Kingston

== Bibliography ==
- Kinnard, Roy & Crnkovich, Tony . The Films of Fay Wray. McFarland, 2005.
