= Brass Monkey (film) =

1949 British film by Thornton Freeland

- Directed by: Thornton Freeland dialogue director Denny Freeman
- Written by: Alec Coppel additional dialogue William Freshman; Vernon Sylvaine; Robert Buckland
- Based on: an original story by Alec Coppel; Thornton Freeland
- Produced by: N.A. Bronsten associate John R. Sloan
- Starring: Carroll Levis; Carole Landis; Herbert Lom
- Cinematography: Basil Emmott
- Edited by: David Hawkins
- Music by: Dr. Bernard Grun
- Distributed by: United Artists
- Release date: 1949 (UK)
- Running time: 100 min.
- Country: United Kingdom
- Language: English

Brass Monkey (also known as The Lucky Mascot) is a 1948 British comedy thriller film with musical asides, directed by Thornton Freeland. It stars Carroll Levis, a radio variety show host and talent scout (known as "Britain's favourite Canadian") and American actress Carole Landis in her last film. It features an early appearance by comic actor Terry-Thomas, playing himself.

Though made in 1948, Brass Monkey was not released in the US until 1951.

== Plot ==
Popular radio presenter Carroll Levis, and Kay Sheldon find themselves entangled in a web of smuggling and murder. When a priceless "brass monkey" is stolen from a Japanese temple and smuggled into England, Levis encounters the eccentric Mr. Ryder-Harris, a Buddhist art connoisseur who's chasing the artefact, and will apparently stop at nothing to get it. The monkey is missing and suspicious murders are being committed in the hunt for its retrieval. With the help of the Discoveries radio talent, Levis attempts to avoid murderous henchman Herbert Lom, and foil Mr. Ryder-Harris's plans. Amongst all the mayhem, an array of musical and comedy performers audition for and appear on The Levis Hour, the hero's weekly radio programme.

== Cast ==
- Carroll Levis as himself
- Carole Landis as Kay Sheldon
- Herbert Lom as Peter Hobart
- Avril Angers as herself
- Ernest Thesiger as Ryder-Harris
- Edward Underdown as Max Taylor
- Henry Edwards as Inspector Miller
- Henry Worthington as Rodney
- Terry-Thomas as himself
- Leslie 'Hutch' Hutchinson as Hutch
- Campbell Cotts as A.J. Gilroy
- Peter Williams as Detective Fellows

== Production ==
Landis arrived in England to make the film in August 1947. Landis reportedly said that she encouraged the English actors to speak more slowly so that U.S. audiences could understand them.

== Songs ==
- "It's the Greatest Business in the world" by Gaby Rogers – staged by Buddy Bradley
- "Home Sweet Home" by Sid Colin and Steve Race
- "Somebody Blew My Bluebird's Egg" by Noel Langley and Pat Quin
- "I Know Myself Too Well" by Ross Parker
- "Tomorrow's Rainbow" by Colin Campbell

== Critical reception ==
The Monthly Film Bulletin wrote: "A mixture of variety acts and thriller, amateurishly made."

In a contemporary review, The Geraldton Guardian called the film a "well told story."

The Radio Times Guide to Films Tony Sloman gave the film 2/5 stars, writing: "This is a bizarre combination of a Saki-esque parable and a vehicle for radio talent scout Carroll Levis."

Time Out called the film a "ramshackle support feature", and concluded it was "a curio, but not really a collectible."

Sky Movies wrote, "a rough (very rough) and tumble British comedy-thriller spun round the then popular shows featuring Carroll Levis. ... Not much as a film ... But of undoubted interest for its extraordinary cast."
