= The Village Squire =

- Directed by: Reginald Denham
- Written by: Arthur Jarvis Black (play); Sherard Powell
- Produced by: Anthony Havelock-Allan
- Starring: David Horne; Leslie Perrins; Moira Lynd; Vivien Leigh
- Cinematography: Francis Carver
- Edited by: Cecil H. Williamson
- Production company: British & Dominions Film Corporation
- Distributed by: Paramount British Pictures
- Release date: April 1935
- Running time: 66 minutes
- Country: United Kingdom
- Language: English

The Village Squire is a 1935 British comedy film directed by Reginald Denham and starring David Horne, Leslie Perrins, Moira Lynd and Vivien Leigh. It was written by Sherard Powell based on the play by Arthur Jarvis Black. The film was made as a quota quickie, produced at Elstree Studios for Paramount.

== Synopsis ==
A village's amateur production of Macbeth is aided by the arrival of a Hollywood star. This provokes the fierce resistance of the village squire who hates films and anything modern.

== Cast ==
- David Horne as Squire Hollis
- Leslie Perrins as Richard Venables
- Moira Lynd as Mary Hollis
- Vivien Leigh as Rose Venables
- Margaret Watson as Aunt Caroline
- Haddon Mason as Doctor Blake
- Ivor Barnard as Mr Worsford

== Reception ==
The Monthly Film Bulletin wrote: "The story seemed likely to get an edge on it when the old squire showed his hatred of new-fangled things like telephones, motor-cars and films, but this was unfortunately very quickly replaced by increasingly less funny borrowing of material from Shakespeare and by a stiltedly-done romance. A few opening shots of gentle village scenes also belied the aggravating casting later on of studio types 'as village folk."

The Daily Film Renter wrote: "Principal entertainment bet is vested in delightful work of David Horne in lead. Developed on lines of stage play, film nevertheless offers fund of amusement that should provoke continual chuckles."
