= Mary Tudor (play) =

1935 history play by Wilfrid Grantham

Mary Tudor is a 1935 history play by the British writer Wilfrid Grantham. It portrays the reign of the Tudor Queen Mary I of England during the sixteenth century. Its West End run at the Playhouse Theatre lasted for 143 performances from 12 December 1935 to 18 April 1936. Flora Robson as Mary and Marius Goring as her husband Philip of Spain were particularly praised for their performances. The cast also included Torin Thatcher, Annie Esmond, Mary Hinton and Joyce Bland.

== Bibliography ==
- Wearing, J.P. The London Stage 1930-1939: A Calendar of Productions, Performers, and Personnel. Rowman & Littlefield, 2014.
