= Aubrey Fitzgerald =

British actor (1874–1968)

Aubrey Fitzgerald (1874–1968) was a British actor.

In 1909 he played El Tabloid in A Persian Princess at the Queen's Theatre in London.

== Selected filmography ==
- One Arabian Night (1923)
- Little Miss Nobody (1923)
- Hutch Stirs 'em Up (1923)
- The Last Witness (1925)
- Nell Gwyn (1926)
- The King's Highway (1927)
- The Glad Eye (1927)
- Widecombe Fair (1928)
- Harmony Heaven (1930)
- The Great Gay Road (1931)
- Goodnight, Vienna (1932)
- Discord (1933)
- The Little Damozel (1933)
- Peg of Old Drury (1935)
- Squibs (1935)
- Chick (1936)
- Jury's Evidence (1936)
- When Knights Were Bold (1936)
- Song of the Forge (1937)
- Cross My Heart (1937)
