= Midnight at Madame Tussaud's =

- Opening titles
- Directed by: George Pearson
- Written by: James S. Edwards; Kim Peacock; Roger MacDougall
- Produced by: James S. Edwards
- Starring: Lucille Lisle; James Carew; Charles Oliver
- Cinematography: Jimmy Borger
- Edited by: E.D.G. Pilkington
- Music by: A.D. Valentine
- Production company: Highbury Studios
- Distributed by: Paramount British Pictures
- Release date: 1936
- Running time: 63 min
- Country: United Kingdom
- Language: English

Midnight at Madame Tussaud's (also known as Midnight at the Wax Museum) is a 1936 British quota quickie thriller film directed by George Pearson and starring Lucille Lisle, James Carew and Charles Oliver. It was written by James S. Edwards, Kim Peacock and Roger MacDougall.

== Plot summary ==
A daring explorer bets his friends he can spend a night in Madame Tussaud's chamber of horrors. Meanwhile, on the outside, his young female ward is in danger from an unscrupulous gang.

== Cast ==
- Lucille Lisle as Carol Cheyne
- James Carew as Sir Clive Cheyne
- Charles Oliver as Harry Newton
- Kim Peacock as Nick Frome
- Patrick Barr as Gerry Melville
- William Hartnell as Stubbs
- Lydia Sherwood as Brenda
- Bernard Miles as Kelvin, the modeller

== Reception ==
Film Weekly wrote: "A ludicrous thriller of a night at the famous waxworks. It is entirely unconvincing, and the only possible interest in the picture Is that it has authentic Madame Tussaud's seitings. Poor entertainment."

The Monthly Film Bulletin wrote: "A good enough plot of its kind, it has been weakened by jumpy development, an abrupt ending and a certain camera-consciousness on the part of the players, with the exception of Patrick Barr and Billy Hartnell who, as reporters, provide the humour. Sound and photography are adequate. The settings, particularly at Madame Tussaud's, are good, but the direction is decidedly amateurish."

Kine Weekly wrote: "Crude, fantastic crime melodrama, the feeble plot of which is sandwiched between visits to Madame Tussaud's. The attempt at the macabre fails, in spite of authentic atmosphere, through poor direction and acting. The entertainment is without plausibility, let alone eerie punch. Very moderate quota booking for uncritical audiences only."

Picture Show wrote: "Unconvincing crook melodrama which is slow in development and lacks pep in general."
