= Born That Way (film) =

1936 British film by Randall Faye

- Lobby card
- Directed by: Randall Faye
- Written by: Diana Bourbon; V.C. Clinton-Baddeley
- Produced by: Randall Faye
- Starring: Elliott Mason; Kathleen Gibson; Terence De Marney; Eliot Makeham
- Cinematography: Geoffrey Faithfull
- Production company: Randall Faye Productions
- Distributed by: RKO Pictures
- Release date: June 1936
- Running time: 64 minutes
- Country: United Kingdom
- Language: English

Born That Way is a 1936 British comedy film directed by Randall Faye and starring Elliott Mason, Kathleen Gibson and Terence De Marney. It was written by Diana Bourbon and V.C. Clinton-Baddeley, and made as a quota quickie at the Nettlefold Studios for distribution by RKO Pictures.

== Plot ==
Pamela and Richard Gearing, the children of preoccupied Egyptologist Professor Gearing, are notorious fixtures in the headlines for their reckless antics as members of Mayfair’s "bright Young Things." Reaching his breaking point, their father enlists his sister-in-law, Emily McNeil, a formidable and sharp-witted Scottish woman, to rein them in. Emily employs unconventional tactics to discipline the duo, eventually transforming them into respectable members of society.

== Cast ==
- Elliott Mason as Aunt Emily
- Kathleen Gibson as Pamela Gearing
- Terence De Marney as Richard Gearing
- Eliot Makeham as Prof. Gearing
- Ian Colin as Hugh
- Conway Palmer as Kenneth Danvers
- John Laurie as McTavish

== Reception ==
The Monthly Film Bulletin wrote: "A really funny film ... John Laurie excels and Kathleen Gibson and Terence de Marney make Pamela and Richard maddening and charming at the same time. It is directed with a real sense of humour and the speed is never allowed to slacken. The film's truthful observation of human nature, young and old, will delight the average audience."

The Daily Film Renter wrote: "Amusing comedy ... It is easily Elliott Mason's film, for this actress, who possesses an attractive Scottish accent, and a quietly effective manner, is in excellent form, bringing great conviction to her role. Kathleen Gibson and Terence de Marney are the recalcitrant youngsters to the life, while Eliot Makeham makes a suitably absent-minded Egyptologist."

Picture Show wrote: "Unpretentious but entertaining story of a hardheaded but warm-hearted Scottish aunt who takes over the supervision of her wayward nephew and niece from her absent-minded brother-in-law, and having accomplished her task, goes back to her own business. Elliott Mason gives a good performance as the canny, dour aunt, and the rest of the cast is competent, with Kathleen Gibson a delightfully wilful niece, Terence de Mamey her somewhat more sullenly inclined brother, and Eliot Makeham as their father. The comedy is adequately directed and set."
