= John Garrick =

British actor (1902–1966)

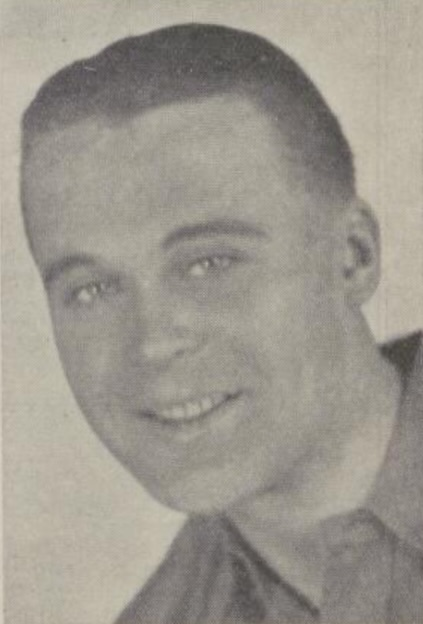
- Portrait of Reginald Dandy (later stage name, John Garrick), published in 1926.
- Born: Reginald Dandy; 31 August 1902; Brighton, Sussex, United Kingdom
- Died: 22 October 1966 (aged 64); San Francisco, California, United States
- Occupation: Actor
- Years active: 1929–1939

John Garrick (born Reginald Dandy; 31 August 1902 – 22 October 1966) was a British stage and screen actor.

Born in Brighton, England, Dandy attended that city's schools and Brighton College.

Dandy made his first stage appearance at the age of ten in A Midsummer Night's Dream. Dandy found employment in a bank after leaving school, but after a few months he left "and turned to the more glamorous life on the stage". He worked up an original vaudeville act which he played at amateur shows. His vaudeville act was taken up by a theatrical manager and was toured throughout Great Britain. Dandy was then signed for a feature role in a revue playing at the Queen's Theatre.

Dandy was engaged to play the male lead in J. C. Williamson's Australian production of the operetta .Rose-Marie which opened in Sydney in May 1926. He performed in Rose-Marie for two years, with seasons throughout Australia and New Zealand. The play's run included an initial record-breaking season of forty-eight weeks in Sydney. After Rose-Marie Dandy took on leading roles in The Desert Song, Katja, the Dancer and Prince Charming.

In 1929 Dandy travelled to America. He arrived in California and found a part as the lead in a play called The Wishing Well which toured the West Coast. In Los Angeles the play closed after only four nights. However officials from Fox Films had seen the show and engaged the young actor for the role of the stage prince in Married in Hollywood, directed by Marcel Silver. Dandy adopted the stage name 'John Garrick' for the role, to avoid confusion with the established actor Reginald Denny.

In 1932, Garrick returned to England and starred in numerous English films.

John Garrick died in San Francisco, California in October 1966, aged 64 years.

== Filmography ==
- Married in Hollywood (1929)
- The Sky Hawk (1929)
- The Lottery Bride (1930)
- Just Imagine (1930)
- Are You There? (1930)
- Song o' My Heart (1930)
- Charlie Chan Carries On (1931)
- Bad Company (1931)
- Always Goodbye (1931)
- Chu Chin Chow (1934)
- The Broken Melody (1934)
- Too Many Millions (1934)
- Anything Might Happen (1934)
- Lily of Killarney (1934)
- Turn of the Tide (1935)
- His Majesty and Company (1935)
- D'Ye Ken John Peel? (1935)
- Street Song (1935)
- Royal Cavalcade (1935)
- The Rocks of Valpre (1935)
- A Touch of the Moon (1936)
- A Woman Alone (1936)
- To Catch a Thief (1936)
- Royal Eagle (1936)
- Shipmates o' Mine (1936)
- I Live Again (1936)
- Bells of St. Mary's (1937)
- Knights for a Day (1937)
- Sunset in Vienna (1937)
- The Last Rose of Summer (1937)
- Riding High (1939)
- Special Edition (1938)
- The Great Victor Herbert (1939)
