= A Touch of the Moon =

1936 film

- John Garrick and Dorothy Boyd in the film
- Directed by: Maclean Rogers
- Written by: Cyril Campion (play); Kathleen Butler; H.F. Maltby
- Produced by: George Smith
- Starring: John Garrick; Dorothy Boyd; Joyce Bland
- Cinematography: Geoffrey Faithfull
- Production company: George Smith Productions
- Distributed by: RKO Pictures
- Release date: 19 February 1936
- Running time: 67 minutes
- Country: United Kingdom
- Language: English

A Touch of the Moon is a 1936 British comedy film directed by Maclean Rogers and starring John Garrick, Dorothy Boyd and Joyce Bland. It was written by Kathleen Butler and H.F. Maltby based on the play by Cyril Campion, and was made at the Walton Studios outside London as a quota quickie for release by RKO Pictures.

== Preservation status ==
The British Film Institute National Archive holds a collection of ephemera and stills but no film or video materials.

== Plot ==
Martin Burnaby gets drunk, and decides to dance and make romance with the first girl he meets. She is Mona Dupare, set to enter into a marriage of convenience with Mr Garfield, an American, to save her elderly uncle from ruin. Martin woos her and succeeds in making her call off the engagement, but at the last minute backs out, thingking of the uncle. Garfield also relents, in Martin's favour, and provides the funds the uncle needs.

== Cast ==
- John Garrick as Martin Barnaby
- Dorothy Boyd as Mona Dupare
- Joyce Bland as Mrs. Fairclough
- David Horne as Colonel Plattner
- Max Adrian as Francis Leverton
- Aubrey Mallalieu as Mr. Dupare
- W.T. Ellwanger as Garfield
- Wally Patch as Police Constable

== Reception ==
The Monthly Film Bulletin wrote: "The story is thin, and the treatment slow. The acting is not outstanding. Joyce Bland as the companion overdoes the sweetly understanding expression. Throughout, the portrayal of the emotions is not good, and this leads to falsity of behaviour, and causes the film to lack interest."

Kine Weekly wrote: "It has a certain amount of novelty of idea, is well photographed and acted, although very verbose. Its light treatment and simple humour should ensure its success in a two-feature programme."

The Daily Film Renter wrote: "Developed with rather an overplus of smart dialogue relevant to the frailty of women, the piece betrays many signs of its stage play origin, but definitely possesses certain pleasing entertainment angles, most of which derive from Martin's whirlwind campaign to win Mona."

Picture Show wrote: "John Garrick is sufficiently light-hearted as the hero, he is well supported by Dorothy Boyd as the lady of his dreams. The remainder of the cast are adequate."
