= Diana Bourbon =

American writer, actress (1900–1978)

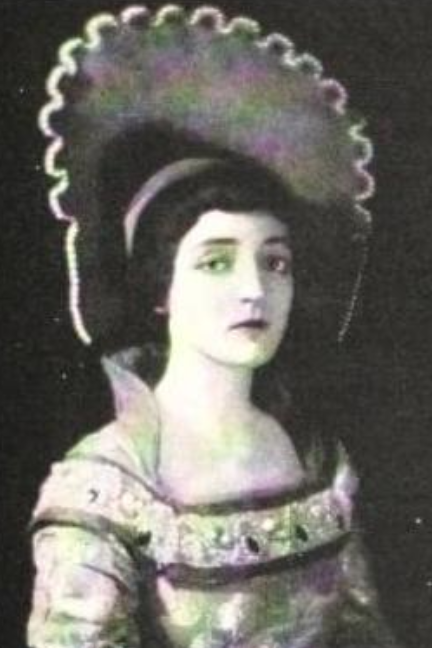
- Diana Bourbon in theatrical costume, from a 1921 publication
- Born: Ruth Hunt; August 28, 1900; New York City
- Died: March 19, 1978 (aged 77); Los Angeles, California
- Other names: Diana Hunt, Diana Hillson (after marriage)
- Occupations: Writer, actress, producer

Diana Bourbon (born Ruth Hunt; August 28, 1900 – March 19, 1978) was an American actress, journalist, producer, director, and writer. She wrote for The New York Times from 1923 to 1927.

== Early life ==
Diana Bourbon was born Ruth Hunt in New York City, the daughter of John Wesley Hunt and Mary Ellen Hunt. Her father was a newspaper editor. She studied ballet, and was educated in Paris, and at Oxford University. As a young woman in World War I, she drove an ambulance and worked in a canteen.

== Career ==
Bourbon began her career as a stage actress, and appeared in one Broadway show, in the original cast of John Galsworthy's Loyalties (1922–1923). She also starred in Edith Millbank's Tancred in London in 1923. Later in life, she returned to the stage in Los Angeles, in Music in the Distance (1960).

Bourbon wrote articles for The New York Times from 1922 to 1927, usually on cultural topics while she was based in London and Paris, such as a 1924 interview with Emma Goldman in exile, a 1924 interview with Amelita Galli-Curci about feminism, and a 1926 interview with H. G. Wells, in which he speculates on the century ahead. She also wrote for Cosmopolitan, and Harper's Bazaar.

Bourbon was a writer, producer, and director in radio, including Burns and Allen's Hollywood Hotel, the game show Double or Nothing (1940–1954), the drama anthology The Campbell Playhouse (1940), the comedy The Judy Canova Show (1943–1944), Club Fifteen (1947–1953), and the soap operas Brenda Curtis (1939–1940) and Life Begins (1940). She also acted on radio, in The Vanishing Lady (1957).

For the screen, she co-wrote Born That Way (1936), and co-wrote the stories adapted as Atlantic Adventure (1935) and Roaming Lady (1936). She had three television acting credits, for roles in episodes of Thriller (1961), The Fugitive (1963), and Mission: Impossible (1968).

== Personal life ==
Bourbon married English writer and editor K. Norman Hillson in 1928; they later divorced. She died in 1978, aged 77 years, in Los Angeles.
