= Hullo Marmaduke =

1924 film

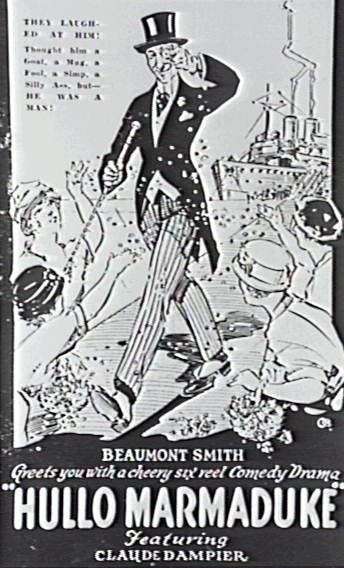
- Original poster
- Directed by: Beaumont Smith
- Written by: Beaumont Smith
- Produced by: Beaumont Smith
- Starring: Claude Dampier
- Production company: Beaumont Smith Productions
- Distributed by: Union Theatres Limited
- Release date: 15 November 1924
- Running time: 6,000 feet
- Country: Australia
- Language: silent

Hullo Marmaduke is a 1924 Australian film comedy drama from director Beaumont Smith about a naive Englishman (Claude Dampier) who comes to Australia as a remittance man. It is considered a lost film.

== Plot ==
Marmaduke (Claude Dampier) is the youngest son of a noble English family who is sent out to Australia on the RMS Osterley with his faithful valet Huggett (Jimmy Taylor). At Fremantle he is swindled by two card sharps out of most of his money. He then goes to Adelaide and makes his way to the gold fields. On the voyage he meets up with barmaid Mrs Mary Morton (Constance Graham) and her young daughter Margie who are looking for Mary's husband Mike (Mayne Lynton). Mrs Morton is killed by some burglars, including her husband, and with her dying breath asks Maramduke to look after her daughter. Marmaduke makes a fortune prospecting, spends the money on Margie and falls in love with her as Margie grows up (Lucille Lisle). Margie is taken prisoner by a lunatic who puts her on board a ship and threatens to blow her up. Marmaduke comes to the rescue, then sees her marry a wealthy suitor.

== Cast ==
- Claude Dampier as Marmaduke
- Mayne Lynton as Mike Morton
- Jimmy Taylor as Huggett
- Constance Graham as Mary Morton
- Grafton Williáms as Squid Squires
- Fernande Butler
- Lucille Lisle as Margie

== Production ==
This was the first film of Claude Dampier, a popular stage and vaudeville comedian. The climax featured the scuttling of the battlecruiser HMAS Australia outside Sydney heads in April 1924. Actual production on the film did not begin until September, however. Interior shooting took place at Australasian Films' studio at Rushcutter's Bay with exterior filming undertaken at Sydney's Domain, The Spit, Newport, Cockatoo Island, the Wentworth Hotel, Potts Point, Balgowlah and the Woolloomooloo wharves among other Sydney locations. Some scenes were also shot aboard the Osterley. Location filming continued into October. Two of the principal cast members, Jimmy Taylor and Grafton Williams had previous film experience in South Africa. Taylor was also a member of Dampier's Trump Cards Revue Company.

== Reception ==
The film was well promoted and proved popular with the public. Smith and Dampier later made The Adventures of Algy (1925) together.

Everyones magazine later said:

The introduction of the sinking of the Australia into the final reel of his last success, “Hullo, Marmaduke,” was a touch of genius, which only Beau Smith would be guilty of. It made the final scenes unforgettable and entirely erased from the mind any flaws there may have been in the earlier part of the story. Possibly there were none, but whatever they might be the final moments gripped the imagination so that they faded to insignificance beside the magnificent spectacle of Australia’s great naval spirit going to its final rest. It was dovetailed into the story in such a manner as to be entirely in harmony what had gone before, though we suspect that its introduction was merely incidental.
