= Cross My Heart (1937 film) =

1937 British film by Bernard Mainwaring

- Directed by: Bernard Mainwaring
- Written by: Basil Keys
- Produced by: Anthony Havelock-Allan
- Starring: Kathleen Gibson; Kenne Duncan; Tully Comber; Aubrey Fitzgerald
- Cinematography: Francis Carver
- Production company: British and Dominions
- Distributed by: Paramount Pictures
- Release date: January 1937
- Running time: 65 minutes
- Country: United Kingdom
- Language: English

Cross My Heart is a 1937 British drama film directed by Bernard Mainwaring and starring Kathleen Gibson, Kenne Duncan and Tully Comber. It was made at Pinewood Studios as a quota quickie for release by Paramount Pictures.

== Plot ==
A woman turns a boarding house into a nightclub, but faces problems when it is raided by the police.

== Cast ==
- Kathleen Gibson as Sally Nichols
- Kenne Duncan as Steve King
- Tully Comber as Chesty Barlow
- Aubrey Fitzgerald as The Major
- Robert Field as Mabardi
- Muriel Johnston as Miss Bly
- Eric Hales as Mr. Bland
- Sylvia Coleridge as Alice
- Sam Blake as Snowball
- Frank Tickle as Henry

== Bibliography ==
- Chibnall, Steve. Quota Quickies: The British of the British 'B' Film. British Film Institute, 2007.
- Low, Rachael. Filmmaking in 1930s Britain. George Allen & Unwin, 1985.
- Wood, Linda. British Films, 1927-1939. British Film Institute, 1986.
