= The Adventures of Algy =

1925 film

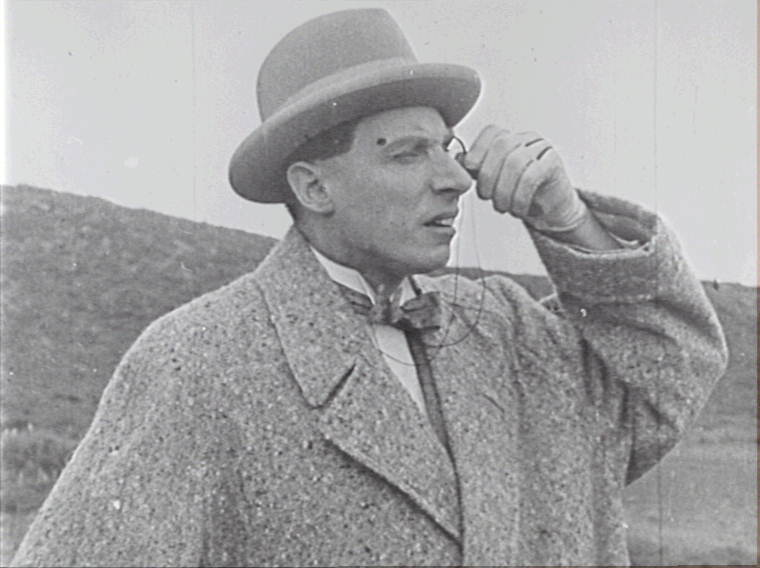
- Claude Dampier in still from the film
- Directed by: Beaumont Smith
- Written by: Beaumont Smith
- Produced by: Beaumont Smith
- Starring: Claude Dampier; Bathia Howie Stuart
- Cinematography: Lacey Percival; Frank Stewart; Syd Taylor; Charles Barton
- Production company: Beaumont Smith's Productions
- Release date: 20 June 1925
- Running time: 97 minutes
- Country: Australia
- Language: silent

The Adventures of Algy is a 1925 Australian comedy film written and directed by Beaumont Smith about a "silly ass" Englishman (Claude Dampier) who inherits a sheep station in New Zealand. It is an unofficial follow up to Hullo Marmaduke (1924), which also starred Dampier.

Unlike most of Smith's silent films, most of the movie survives today.

== Plot ==
Algy (Claude Dampier) is an Englishman who travels to New Zealand to claim a sheep station he has inherited. He falls in love with a neighbour, Kiwi McHill (Bathie Stuart), then travels to Australia. He runs into Kiwi again, using dances she has learned from her Māori friends in a Sydney revue. When he returns to New Zealand he strikes oil on his farm and he and Kiwi are married.

== Cast ==
- Claude Dampier as Algernon Allison
- Bathie Stuart as Kiwi McGill
- Eric Harrison as Murray Watson
- Billie Carlyle as Mollie Moore
- George Chalmers as John McGill
- Lester Brown as stage manager
- Eric Yates
- Beaumont Smith
- Hilda Attenboro
- Verna Blain

== Production ==
The Adventures of Algy was shot on location in New Zealand and Sydney during the early part of 1925. New Zealand locations included Wellington, Auckland, Christchurch, Dunedin, Taranaki, and Rotarua (notably the hot springs). Exterior locations in Sydney included Martin Place, Circular Quay, Watson's Bay Gap, the Palace Theatre, and Sydney Harbour (aboard the ferry Kubu). The scene at the Gap focused on a sensational aspect of the story whereby a young girl attempts to throw herself over the cliff. Interior filming took place at Australasian Films' Rushcutters Bay studio. As with Smith and Dampier's previous film, Hullo Marmaduke, The Adventures of Algy was given a joint world premiere at Sydney's Lyric Wintergarden and Lyceum theatres.

Dampier later married his co-star, Billie Carlyle.

== Reception ==
Reviews for the film were generally positive. Film writers Andrew Pike and Ross Cooper wrote that:

The film... reveals a heavy reliance on titles to propel the insubstantial plot along, and frequently the images are little more than illustrations for the printed text.

Everyones magazine wrote that Smith:

Made the experiment of going out for screen types— and got them. Here again Beau Smith shows his originality, for he practically ignored the aenemic blonde and the sloe eyed brunette so usually sought after by directors and went out bald-headed for the real types wnich we see around us and who usually imagine themselves unfitted for the screen. The result will be seen when the picture is released shortly. They are a rare bunch and the comedy scenes in which they are included are enhanced considerably by their introduction.

Smith was becoming exhausted with film production and concentrated on distribution and exhibition instead over the next eight years. He returned to directing with The Hayseeds (1933).
