= Atlantic Adventure =

1935 film directed by Albert S. Rogell

- Directed by: Albert S. Rogell
- Written by: John T. Neville; Nat Dorfman; Diana Bourbon
- Produced by: Everett Riskin
- Starring: Nancy Carroll; Lloyd Nolan; Harry Langdon
- Cinematography: John Stumar
- Edited by: Ted J. Kent
- Production company: Columbia Pictures
- Distributed by: Columbia Pictures
- Release date: August 25, 1935
- Running time: 68 minutes
- Country: United States
- Language: English

Atlantic Adventure is a 1935 American comedy mystery film directed by Albert S. Rogell and starring Nancy Carroll, Lloyd Nolan and Harry Langdon.

== Plot ==
A reporter is dismissed from his job, primarily due to distractions from his fiancée, which causes him to miss an important story. Despite his setback, Miller is determined to prove his competence. Acting on a tip, he believes that the murderer of a local district attorney plans to escape via a luxury liner. Nolan, accompanied by his photographer and Murdock embark on the journey. During the voyage, not only does he manage to identify the killer, but he also aids in apprehending a group of jewel thieves.

== Partial cast ==
- Nancy Carroll as Helen Murdock
- Lloyd Nolan as Dan Miller
- Harry Langdon as Snapper McGillicuddy
- Arthur Hohl as Frank Julian
- Robert Middlemass as Harry Van Dieman
- John Wray as Mitts Coster
- E.E. Clive as McIntosh
- Dwight Frye as Spike Jonas
- Rhody Hathaway (uncredited)

== Bibliography ==
- Paul L. Nemcek. The films of Nancy Carroll. 1969.
