= Carroll Levis =

Canadian talent scout (1910–1968)

- Born: Carroll Richard Levis; March 15, 1910; Toronto, Canada
- Died: October 17, 1968 (aged 58); London, England
- Occupations: Broadcaster, talent scout
- Years active: 1930s–1968

Carroll Richard Levis (March 15, 1910 – October 17, 1968) was a Canadian talent scout, impresario and radio and television broadcaster, mainly working in Britain.

== Biography ==
Born in Toronto and brought up in Vancouver, the son of a murdered policeman, he grew up wanting to be an actor, but held various jobs in movie theatres and as a deckhand before doing some work as a comedian and stage hypnotist. He began broadcasting as an announcer with CKWX in Vancouver. When working in Alberta, on one occasion he had time to fill in during a live broadcast and persuaded a boy in the audience to sing a song. Following a good listener reaction, he started a local radio talent show, Saturday Night Club of the Air, and then a similar programme in Montreal.

In 1935, he decided to move to England. He met radio producer Eric Maschwitz, and they developed a tour of British cities to find new talent. His touring stage shows attracted thousands of applicants from potential performers, as well as large theatre audiences, and his first radio shows, Carroll Levis and his Discoveries, were broadcast in September 1936. The Radio Times reported the following year that "in the last two years [he] has heard thirty thousand people. Of the amateur acts he has introduced, forty-five have turned professional. Not one of them is earning less than £5 a week, and one is getting as much as £25."

Levis also presented talent shows on Radio Luxembourg, from 1937, and in 1939 played himself in a comedy film, Discoveries, which introduced the song "There'll Always Be an England". During World War II, he presented other programmes on BBC radio, such as the variety shows Carroll Levis Carries On and The Carroll Levis Hour, and toured military outposts in Europe and the Middle East. In 1945, Levis was featured in a concert show which entertained troops of the First Canadian Army.

Among the performers "discovered" by Levis were comedian and actor Jim Dale, comedian Barry Took, and actress Anne Heywood. After the end of the war, Levis continued with his stage shows and radio broadcasts. In 1946, The Carroll Levis Show introduced Cardew Robinson and Avril Angers. In 1948 he starred in the British mystery film Brass Monkey, in which he played himself. He suffered a mental breakdown in the late 1940s, and for a time was replaced by his brother, Cyril Levis, the show being renamed Carroll Levis' Discoveries.

He started a comeback on radio in 1950, and in 1953 The Carroll Levis Discovery Show moved to television, showcasing the talents of young people, with the catchline: "Truly, the discoveries of today are the stars of tomorrow". At the opening of his TV show, the banner read, "TeLEVISion", utilising his name, "Levis", which formed part of the word, "Television". However, his appearances on television were deemed "patronising and insincere". He also had an acting role in The Depraved (1957), which featured his discovery, Anne Heywood.

In 1959 the Beatles, performing as "Johnny and the Moondogs", audition in Liverpool for his TV program Star Search.

In 1961, he removed himself from the public eye, only to attempt a return in 1968 after a four-year struggle with a stomach ailment. However, he died the same year, in London, aged 58.
