= Discoveries (film) =

1939 British film by Redd Davis

- Feature on the film from The Daily Film Renter (15 August 1939)
- Directed by: Redd Davis
- Written by: Anatole de Grunwald; Cyril Campion; Redd Davis
- Starring: Carroll Levis; Cyril Levis; Ronald Shiner
- Edited by: John Seabourne
- Production company: Highbury Studios
- Release date: 1939
- Running time: 68 minutes
- Country: United Kingdom
- Language: English

Discoveries is a 1939 British black-and-white musical film directed by Redd Davis and starring Carroll Levis, Ronald Shiner, and a cast of variety acts. It was written by Anatole de Grunwald, Cyril Campion and Davis based on the BBC radio series Carroll Levis and his Discoveries, and produced by Grand National Pictures (the British company).

The film is notable for introducing the song "There'll Always Be an England", which is sung onscreen by the boy soprano Glyn Davies, and was subsequently recorded by Vera Lynn.

The film was re-released in 1948.

== Synopsis ==
Carroll Levis tours around the country auditioning new talent, competing to join his roster of "discoveries". As linking stories, rivals Spinelli and Schwitzer, respectively manufacturers of spaghetti and cheese, compete to become the show's sponsor; Jim Pike, on the run from the police, joins the show as a stage hand; and a waiter perpetually pesters Levis for a spot on the show.

== Cast ==
- Carroll Levis as himself
- Cyril Levis as stage manager
- Ronald Shiner as Jim Archibald Pike
- Afrique as Alfredo
- Doris Hare as Bella Brown
- Kathleen Harrison as kitchen maid
- Bertha Belmore as Policewoman Duggan
- Issy Bonn as Emil Schwitzer
- Julien Vedey as Antonio Spinelli
- Zoe Wynne as Susy
- Barbara Everest as Pearl's mother
- Frank Atkinson as photographer
- The Three Ginx as the barbers

=== Discoveries ===
- Archie Galbraith
- Tony Vaughan
- Pearl Venters
- David Delmonte
- Glyn Davies
- Ken Bonner
- Dump and Tony
- George Meaton
- The Radio Rascals
- May Patterson
- Edith Ellis
- Evelyne Skinner
- Cecil Phillips
- Wally Hill

== Reception ==
Kine Weekly wrote: "Musical revue, bringing to the screen discoveries of Carroll Levis, well-known talent scout of radio, stage and music-hall. The budding stars cover fully the field of variety, and have enthusiasm to offset their lack of experience. Afrique, the famous mimic, is a tower of strength in the entertainment in a character comedy role, and a stalwart example to the recruits. ... The story is not particularly original, but it at least breaks up the flow of exuberant talent. ... There is a patriotic grand finale featuring juvenile Glyn Davies, to wind up the entertainment."

The Monthly Film Bulletin wrote: "A vaudeville show. Carroll Levis, well known to radio listeners as one who brings newly discovered talent to the microphone, is transferred in this role to the screen. The film consists of a number of music-hall turns loosely strung together. Carroll Levis is a distinctly camera conscious compere who has to struggle with unpromising material."
