= Issy Bonn =

British comedian, singer, actor, and theatrical agent (1903–1977)

Background information
- Born: Benjamin Levin; 21 April 1903; Whitechapel, London, England
- Died: 21 April 1977 (aged 74) Wembley Park, London
- Occupations: Singer, comedian, theatrical agent

Issy Bonn (born Benjamin Levin; 21 April 1903 – 21 April 1977) was a British comedian, singer, actor, and theatrical agent. His signature song was "My Yiddishe Momme".

== Biography ==
Benjamin Levin was born into a Jewish family in Whitechapel, London, the son of a butcher. As a boy, he started singing and entertaining, but his family disapproved of his interest in the music hall and he was sent to Canada to live with relatives. When he returned, he joined an existing comedy and singing group, the Three Rascals, and used the stage name Benny Levine. He went solo in the early 1920s. He took the stage name Issy Bonn at the suggestion of BBC Radio producer John Sharman, who produced a popular programme, John Sharman's Music Hall, and made his first radio appearance on the show in 1935, billed as "The Hebrew Vocal Raconteur". He combined sentimental songs such as "My Yiddish Momme" and "Let Bygones Be Bygones", with Jewish humour and sketches, many featuring the fictitious Finkelfeffer family.

Issy Bonn made over a thousand radio broadcasts on programmes such as Variety Bandbox, and reputedly had a repertoire of over 500 songs. He also regularly toured South Africa. He appeared in the films I Thank You in 1941, and Discoveries in 1939, where he played Mr. Schwitzer. He made his first recordings in 1942, for the Rex label, and later recorded for Decca and Columbia. He toured Europe with the Entertainments National Service Association (ENSA), and after the Second World War wrote and starred in his own road shows including The Big Broadcasts and The Melody Lingers On.

In the 1950s, his style of humour, trading on traditional Jewish stereotypes, went out of fashion, but he continued to appear on radio, television, and in pantomimes, and toured, often with the popular trumpeter Eddie Calvert. He later retired from performing and became a theatrical agent, and a producer of variety shows around the country. He made his last appearance as a performer in 1963. His image appears on the cover of The Beatles album Sgt. Pepper's Lonely Hearts Club Band (behind Paul McCartney, waving).

He died on his 74th birthday, in London.
