= She Shall Have Music =

1935 film

- Directed by: Leslie S. Hiscott
- Written by: Paul England; Arthur Macrae; H. Fowler Mear; C. Denier Warren
- Produced by: Julius Hagen
- Starring: Jack Hylton; June Clyde; Claude Dampier
- Cinematography: Sydney Blythe; William Luff
- Edited by: Ralph Kemplen
- Music by: W.L. Trytel
- Production company: Julius Hagen Productions
- Distributed by: Twickenham Film Distributors
- Release date: 1935
- Running time: 91 minutes
- Country: United Kingdom
- Language: English

She Shall Have Music (also known as Wherever She Goes) is a 1935 British musical comedy film directed by Leslie S. Hiscott and starring Jack Hylton, June Clyde and Claude Dampier. It was written by Paul England, Arthur Macrae, H. Fowler Mear and C. Denier Warren.

== Synopsis ==
A millionaire shipowner hires a band to publicise his ships, while a rival company tries to ruin his scheme.

== Cast ==
- Jack Hylton as himself, bandleader
- June Clyde as Dorothy Drew
- Claude Dampier as Eddie
- Brian Lawrance as Brian Gates
- Gwen Farrar as Miss Peachum
- Marjorie Brooks as Mrs. Marlowe
- Edmund Breon as Freddie Gates
- Felix Aylmer as Donald Black

== Production ==
The film was made at Twickenham Studios with sets designed by the art director James A. Carter.

For distribution in the United States, to comply with the 1930 Motion Picture Production Code scenes involving portions of two songs and a dance featuring "an undue amount of nudity" were removed.

== Reception ==
The Monthly Film Bulletin wrote: "Musical romance concerned mainly with performances by Jack Hylton's band and attempts to wreck a special broadcast. The director is, perhaps wisely, content to let the succession of turns take each its own way, linked together by a slender story of a romance. The band numbers are the main feature, a 'repartee' number being specially noteworthy for its splendid timing. The Leon Woizikowsky Ballet makes an interesting appearance, not too much cut up by any attempt at fancy editing, and Claude Dampier intrudes his eccentric fooling at intervals. A versatile film of many talents."

The Daily Film Renter wrote: "Jack Hylton and His Band in bright, lively entertainment that combines generous lashings of melody, humour, romance and spectacle. ... Musicians perform in wide variety of locales, supplemented by song and dance turns, and decorative chorus of high-steppers. June Clyde registers effectively in ingenue lead. Excellent box-office for Hylton fans."

Picture Show wrote: "Jack Hylton's introduction to the screen with his famous band is a complete success. He is perfectly natural as himself, and the band is in great form. ... A most entertaining picture."
