= Scruffy =

Scruffy may refer to:

== Arts and entertainment ==
- Scruffy (1938 film), a British film
- Scruffy (1980 film), an animated film based on the children's book Scruffy: The Tuesday Dog
- Scruffy, a 1962 novel by Paul Gallico and the title character, a Barbary ape
- Scruffy (Futurama), a recurring character in the Futurama animated series
- Scruffy, the Muirs' dog in the TV series The Ghost & Mrs. Muir
- Bill "Scruffy" McGuffey, a character in the BBC children's series Grange Hill - see List of Grange Hill characters
- Scruffy, a character in the Pet Alien animated series
- Scruffy Banister, a cat in the 1990 movie Madhouse

== Other uses ==
- Neats vs. scruffies, in the field of artificial intelligence, a school of thought that prefers empiricism to formalism
- Scruffy, a graphical library in Ruby programming language
- Walter H. Longton (1892–1927), English First World War flying ace and later air racer
- Scruffy Wallace (fl. 2003–present), Scottish-born Canadian bagpipe player and member of the punk group Dropkick Murphys
