= The Judy Canova Show =

American old-time radio comedy-variety program

- Other names: Rancho Canova
- Genre: Comedy-variety
- Country of origin: United States
- Language: English
- Syndicates: CBS; NBC
- Starring: Judy Canova
- Announcer: Ken Niles; Howard Petrie; Verne Smith
- Created by: J. Donald Wilson
- Produced by: Diana Bourbon; Carlton Alsop; Joe Rines
- Original release: July 6, 1943 – May 28, 1953
- Sponsored by: Colgate-Palmolive-Peet

The Judy Canova Show is an American old-time radio comedy-variety program. It was broadcast on CBS July 6, 1943 – June 27, 1944, and on NBC January 13, 1945 – June 30, 1951, and December 29, 1951 – May 28, 1953. Each version differed from the others to some extent, although comedy and music remained the focal points. The program is notable for being the medium in which Judy Canova found her greatest success.

== CBS version ==
=== Background ===
Originally titled Rancho Canova, the program began as a summer replacement for a show that starred Al Jolson. The sponsor later decided to not bring The Al Jolson Show back but to continue the Canova program instead. When Canova's program went off the air, it was replaced by Colgate Theater of Romance, which dramatized famous love stories.

=== Premise ===
The program's premise was that the fictional version of Judy Canova moved from a rural area to California in hopes that her Aunt Aggie could help her to become more sophisticated. Episodes included situation-comedy segments related to Canova's interactions with family and friends, one of whom was Benchley Botsford, her love interest. Canova usually sang three songs in each episode, including one just after the show came on and one just before it went off.

=== Characters and cast ===
Besides Canova, characters and the actors who portrayed them are shown in the table below:

Character	Actor or Actress
Aunt Aggie	Ruth Perrott; Verna Felton
Benchley Botsford	George Dietz
Geranium	Ruby Dandridge
Pedro	Mel Blanc
Mr. Simpson	Gale Gordon; Joseph Kearns
Monroe Simpson	Tommy Bernard
Baby Bubakins	Jerry Hausner

Elvia Allman and Hans Conried were also heard regularly in a variety of roles, and the Sportsmen Quartet sang. Announcers were Ken Niles, Howard Petrie, and Verne Smith; Orchestra leaders were Opie Cates, Charles Dant, and Gordon Jenkins.

The program was created by J. Donald Wilson and produced initially by Diana Bourbon, who was succeeded by Carlton Alsop. The sponsor was Colgate-Palmolive-Peet.

== NBC version ==
In the NBC version, the fictional Canova was a film actress who lived in California with her maid and had a weekly radio program. As in the previous version, Canova sang in the show, usually between acts.

Besides Canova, characters and the actors who portrayed them are shown in the table below:

Character	Actor or Actress
Aunt Aggie	Ruth Perrott
Gordon Mansfield	Gale Gordon
Patsy Pierce	Verna Felton
Geranium	Ruby Dandridge
Pedro	Mel Blanc
Roscoe Wortle	Mel Blanc
Hubert Updyke	Jim Backus
Joe Crunchmiller	Sheldon Leonard
Benchley Botsford	Joseph Kearns
Mailman	Joseph Kearns
Brenda	Sharon Douglas
Mr. Hemingway	Hans Conried
William Boswell	Hans Conried

George Neise was also heard regularly in a variety of roles, and the Sportsmen Quartet and The Southerners sang. Howard Petrie was the announcer, and Charles Dant led the orchestra. Joe Rines produced and directed, with Fred Fox, Henry Hoople, John Ward, Bill Demling. and Arthur Phillips as writers.

== Unfulfilled plans ==
In April 1954, the trade publication Variety reported that CBS planned to have a 90-minute program that would have Canova as star and feature stars of both films and recordings. Apparently that plan never reached fruition.
