= The Bank Raiders =

1958 British film by Maxwell Munden

- Original British quad poster
- Directed by: Maxwell Munden
- Written by: Brandon Fleming
- Produced by: Geoffrey Goodheart
- Starring: Peter Reynolds; Sandra Dorne; Sydney Tafler
- Cinematography: Henry Hall
- Edited by: Inman Hunter
- Production company: Geoffrey Goodhart Productions (as Film Workshop)
- Distributed by: J. Arthur Rank Film Distributors (U.K.)
- Release date: October 1958
- Running time: 62 mins
- Country: United Kingdom
- Language: English

The Bank Raiders is a 1958 British second feature crime film directed by Maxwell Munden and starring Peter Reynolds, Sandra Dorne and Lloyd Lamble. It was written by Brandon Fleming.

The film was one of several British crime films starring Reynolds.

== Plot ==
Small-time hoodlum Terry is the driver in a successful bank robbery. He gets his share of the loot and is told to lie low. Instead, he goes on the town with Della, a gorgeous, but greedy, party girl. Terry is questioned and released by police. Bernie Shelton, the gang boss, kidnaps the only witness. Then he sends his goon Linders to kill Terry, but Linders gets shot instead. With police after him, Terry seeks shelter in Della's apartment. When Della learns that Shelton, a man who spurned her, was behind the raid, she promises to run away with Terry, if he will confront his boss at gun-point to get the rest of the loot.

== Cast ==
- Peter Reynolds as Terry Milligan
- Sandra Dorne as Della Byrne
- Sydney Tafler as Bernie Shelton
- Lloyd Lamble as Detective Inspector Mason
- Rose Hill as landlady
- Arthur Mullard as Linders
- Tim Ellison as Jack Conner
- Ann King as Ann Seaton
- Robert Bruce as Det. Sgt. Bates
- Jeanne Kent as Mrs Conner
- Roberta Woolley as Sonia Conner

== Critical reception ==
Monthly Film Bulletin said "This routine second feature falls well below the standard of the usual efficient supporting film. The three principals give capable performances, but the players of the smaller parts are considerably less convincing. The total result is decidedly humdrum."

Picture Show wrote: "Direction, photography and acting are hardly up to standard."

Radio Times called it "A dismal B-movie ... Designed as something to have on the screen while the queue was being let in to the cinema, it's cheap and cheerless wallpaper, though connoisseurs of early TV sitcoms might relish the sight of heavyweight Arthur Mullard, who usually turned in performances as the village idiot."

In Directors in British and Irish Cinema, Robert Murphy called the film "a singularly unconvincing depiction of life in the English underworld."

In British Sound Films: The Studio Years 1928–1959 David Quinlan rated the film as "poor", writing: "Rock-bottom 'B' film, very badly acted with the exception of the three stars."
