= Alert in the Mediterranean =

1938 film

- Directed by: Léo Joannon
- Written by: Léo Joannon; T.H. Robert; Roger Vitrac
- Starring: Pierre Fresnay; Nadine Vogel; Rolf Wanka
- Cinematography: Marcel Lucien
- Edited by: Louis Devaivre
- Music by: Michel Michelet
- Production company: Société des Films Vega
- Distributed by: Compagnie Commerciale Française Cinématographique
- Release date: 1 September 1938
- Running time: 104 minutes
- Country: France
- Language: French

Alert in the Mediterranean (French: Alerte en Méditerranée) is a 1938 French thriller film directed by Léo Joannon and starring Pierre Fresnay, Nadine Vogel and Rolf Wanka. It was the fifth most popular film at the French box office in 1938. It also proved a success in Belgium after being released in Brussels in October 1938. It was the winner of the Grand prix du cinéma français for best French film. The film's sets were designed by the art director Robert Gys. The following year it was remade in Britain as Hell's Cargo directed by Harold Huth.

== Synopsis ==
After meeting in Tangiers three naval officers, British, French and German, are able to overcome their national antipathy and come to the assistance of a neutral ship in distress.

== Cast ==
- Pierre Fresnay as Le commandant Lestailleur
- Nadine Vogel as Claire Lestailleur
- Rolf Wanka as von Schlieden
- Kim Peacock as Le commandant Falcon
- Jean-Claude Debully as Le petit Pierre
- Jean Témerson as Le docteur Laurent
- Louis Seigner as Le juge d'instruction
- Raymond Aimos as Huguenin, le second-maître
- Jean Tissier as Le journaliste
- Fernand Ledoux as Martin
- René Bergeron as Le capitaine Dulac
- Jean Daurand as Le matelot Calas
- Edmond Ardisson as La matelot Jaubert
- Michael Hogarth as Le matelot anglair
- Kroneger as Le matelot allemand
- Robert Pizani as Le médecin du port
- Jacques Berlioz as Le commandant du paquebot
- Tony Murcie as Le second du paquebot
- Frédéric Mariotti as Un homme de main
- Jean d'Yd as Le père Blanc
- Georges Tourreil as L'officier des Spahis
- Georges Prieur as L'amiral
- Duluard as Le second du torpilleur
- Jacques Vitry
- Henry Bonvallet]
- Marc Dantzer

== Bibliography ==
- Crisp, Colin. Genre, Myth and Convention in the French Cinema, 1929-1939. Indiana University Press, 2002.
- Driskell, Jonathan. The French Screen Goddess: Film Stardom and the Modern Woman in 1930s France. I.B.Tauris, 2015.
