= Moira Lynd =

British actress (1903–1984)

- Born: 1903; Edinburgh, Scotland; United Kingdom
- Died: 1984 (aged 80–81)
- Occupations: Film actor Television actor Stage actor

Moira Lynd (1903–1984) was a British stage, television and film actress. During the 1930s she became a leading lady in British quota quickies. She made her last film in 1940, but made several television appearances in the post-war era.

== Filmography ==
- The Perfect Lady (1931)
- Verdict of the Sea (1932)
- The Strangler (1932)
- Illegal (1932)
- Going Straight (1933)
- Swinging the Lead (1934)
- The Right Age to Marry (1935)
- Vanity (1935)
- The Village Squire (1935)
- Luck of the Turf (1936)
- Full Speed Ahead (1936)
- Nothing Like Publicity (1936)
- All That Glitters (1937)
- The Spider (1940)

== Bibliography ==
- Chibnall, Steve. Quota Quickies: The Birth of the British 'B' film. British Film Institute, 2007.
