= Joyce Bland =

British actress (1906–1963)

- Joyce Bland.
- Born: Joyce Elizabeth K. Bland; 10 May 1906; Caerleon, Wales; United Kingdom
- Died: 24 August 1963 (aged 57); Bournemouth, Dorset; United Kingdom
- Years active: 1932-1938

Joyce Bland (10 May 1906 – 24 August 1963) was a Welsh film actress.

== Early life ==
Joyce Bland was born in 1906, at Caerleon, Wales. She trained at the Royal Academy of Dramatic Arts.

== Career ==
Bland made her stage debut on tour in 1927 in The Constant Nymph. She then returned to London and understudied Tallulah Bankhead. In 1935 she appeared in the historical play Mary Tudor.

Her interpretation of the role of Goneril in King Lear was considered "extraordinary" and "sinister". However, another critic referred to her as "the aptly named Joyce Bland," who "spoke finely" and "looked beautiful" as Desdemona in Othello at Stratford.

Later she went to North America where she appeared in Shakespearean roles.

== Filmography ==
=== Film ===
Year	Title	Role	Notes
1932	Goodnight, Vienna	Countess Helga	
1932	The Flag Lieutenant	Mrs. Cameron	
1932	The Barton Mystery	Helen Barton	
1933	The Crime at Blossoms	Valerie Merryman	
1935	The Right Age to Marry	Ellen	
1936	A Touch of the Moon	Mrs. Fairclough	
1936	Spy of Napoleon	The Empress	
1937	Dreaming Lips	Christine	
1937	Victoria the Great	Florence Nightingale	
1937	Cymbeline	Imogen	TV film
1937	Genius at Home	Jane Carlyle	TV film
1938	Coming of Age	Isobel Strudwick	
1938	Chips	Lady	
1938	Sixty Glorious Years	Florence Nightingale	
1938	The Citadel	Nurse Sharp	
1939	England's Shakespeare	Rosalind	Documentary short
