= The Vandergilt Diamond Mystery =

- Directed by: Randall Faye
- Written by: Michael Crombie; Margaret Houghton
- Produced by: Randall Faye
- Starring: Betty Astell; Bruce Seton; Hilary Pritchard
- Cinematography: Geoffrey Faithfull
- Production company: Randall Faye Productions
- Distributed by: RKO
- Release date: 8 January 1936
- Running time: 60 minutes
- Country: United Kingdom
- Language: English

The Vandergilt Diamond Mystery is a 1936 British comedy crime film directed by Randall Faye and starring Betty Astell, Bruce Seton and Hilary Pritchard. It was written by Michael Crombie and Margaret Houghton, and was made at Shepperton Studios as a quota quickie.

== Preservation status ==
The British Film Institute National Archive holds a collection of ephemera and stills but no film or video materials.

== Plot ==
Mary determines to get her hands on a valuable diamond necklace owned by the wealthy Mrs. Vandergilt, believing that the heirloom rightfully belongs to her. However, a ruthless gang of American thugs also has their sights set on the jewellery. In the chaotic struggle to steal it, the necklace accidentally slips into a bag belonging to Hardcastle, an eligible bachelor. Unwittingly caught in the middle, Hardcastle catches on to what is happening and decides to team up with Mary. Together, they successfully secure the necklace, and also find romance.

== Cast ==
- Betty Astell as Mary
- Bruce Seton as Hardcastle
- Hilary Pritchard as Briggs
- Charles Paton as Mr. Throstle
- Ethel Royale as Mrs. Throstle
- Graham Soutten as The Boss
- Billy Holland as Carponi
- Henry B. Longhurst as Inspector Greig

== Reception ==
The Monthly Film Bulletin wrote: "The film needs tightening and speeding up: the direction is uncertain, and we are left in doubt as to whether the American crooks and the British police are attempts at reality or caricature. But Mr. Throssle, played by Charles Paton, is spontaneously funny, and there is more entertainment in this than in many a better film."

Kine Weekly wrote: "Here is a picture that is neither burlesque, straight comedy, comedy drama, nor a straightforward thriller. So slapdash is the treatment and incredibly hazy the story that its label has yet to be coined."

Picturegoer wrote: "Ridiculous plot, which fails to interest one to any extent in its vagaries, which are more often laughable because of the way they are developed than for any humorous matter contained in themselves."

Picture Show wrote: "This poor production may be a skit on gangster films, and it may be just a bad mixture of melodrama, farce, comedy and romance."
