= One Arabian Night =

1923 film

- Directed by: Sinclair Hill
- Written by: Sinclair Hill
- Starring: George Robey
- Production company: Stoll Pictures
- Distributed by: Stoll Pictures
- Release date: December 1923
- Running time: 75 minutes
- Country: United Kingdom
- Languages: Silent; English intertitles

One Arabian Night is a 1923 British silent comedy film directed by Sinclair Hill and starring George Robey. It is based on the story of Aladdin.

== Cast ==
- Aubrey Fitzgerald as Servant
- Lionelle Howard as Aladdin
- Julia Kean as Princess
- H. Agar Lyons as Li-Pong
- Edward O'Neill as Abanazar
- George Robey as Widow Twan-Kee
- Basil Saunders as Slave of the Lamp
- W.G. Saunders as Emperor
- Julie Suedo as Fairy of the Ring

== Bibliography ==
- Goble, Alan. The Complete Index to Literary Sources in Film. Walter de Gruyter, 1999.
- Low, Rachael. The History of the British Film 1918-1929. George Allen & Unwin, 1971.
