= Swinging the Lead =

1934 film by David MacKane

- Directed by: David Mackane
- Produced by: Philip Weiner
- Starring: William Hartnell; Moira Lynd; Gibb McLaughlin
- Production companies: Mackane and Rogers Weiner
- Release date: 28 January 1935
- Running time: 63 minutes
- Country: United Kingdom
- Language: English

Swinging the Lead is a 1934 British quota quickie comedy film directed by David MacKane and starring William Hartnell, Moira Lynd and Gibb McLaughlin.

== Preservation status ==
The British Film Institute National Archive holds no stills or ephemera, and no film or video materials.

== Premise ==
Criminals sell a drug that changes people's personalities.

== Cast ==
- William Hartnell as Freddy Fordum
- Moira Lynd as Joan Swid
- Gibb McLaughlin as Inigo Larsen
- Marie Ault as Mrs. Swid
- George Rogers as Benjamin Brown
- Nita Harvey as Peggy

== Reception ==
The Daily Film Renter wrote: "Fantastic and garbled Quota effort ... Scrappy narration makes fatuous story difficult to follow, but absurdity of incidents and forced humour in any case kill interest. Amateurish offering difficult to recommend anywhere. This film unfolds a story as absurd and nearly as cryptic as the name of the drug – 'Xsickipopple ' – with which it is concerned ... So amateurish is the development and handling of the plot, that little purpose would be served by detailed criticism. Three or four capable players, such as Marie Ault, Moyra Lind and Billy Hartnel, are entirely wasted in impossible characterisations."
