= Kim Peacock =

British actor (1901–1966)

- Born: 24 March 1901; Watford, Hertfordshire; United Kingdom
- Died: 26 December 1966 (aged 65); Emsworth, Hampshire; United Kingdom
- Occupation: Film actor
- Years active: 1927–1966

Kim Peacock (24 March 1901 – 26 December 1966) was an actor and writer, known for Midnight at the Wax Museum (1936), BBC Sunday-Night Theatre (1950) and Hit Parade (1952). He was born in Watford, Hertfordshire, England.

He played the title character in the BBC Radio serial Paul Temple between 1946 and 1953.

He was the son of Watford Rovers footballer Charlie Peacock, who later became the owner of the Watford Observer, the town's newspaper. He died in Emsworth, Hampshire.

== Selected filmography ==
- The Manxman (1929)
- The Clue of the New Pin (1929)
- The Crooked Billet (1929)
- A Warm Corner (1930)
- The Mad Hatters (1935)
- Expert's Opinion (1935)
- Midnight at Madame Tussaud's (1936)
- Grand Finale (1936)
- Captain's Orders (1937)
- Alert in the Mediterranean (1938)
- Hell's Cargo (1939)
- Flannelfoot (1953)
