= Althea Henley =

American actress (1911–1996)

- Born: July 23, 1911; Egypt, Pennsylvania, U.S.
- Died: April 25, 1996 (aged 84); Smith's Island, Bermuda
- Years active: 1930–1936

Althea Henley (July 23, 1911 – April 25, 1996) was an American film actress and dancer. She appeared in approximately 15 films between 1930 and 1936.

== Early life and education ==
Henley was born in Egypt, Pennsylvania, on July 23, 1911, the second of four children. She was trained as a dancer while growing up near Allentown, Pennsylvania, and eventually moved to New York City to appear in vaudeville. While in New York City, Henley performed in Florenz Ziegfeld's Show Girl.

== Career ==
Henley moved to Hollywood, California, and appeared in several films for Fox Film and Columbia Pictures. Her roles were restricted to those of a showgirl or other romantic interests.

She appeared with The Three Stooges in Three Little Beers in 1935 and Ants in the Pantry in 1936. In 1936, she also appeared as the sound stage girl in The Three Stooges film Movie Maniacs, in which she was Larry's kissing partner.

Henley also had bit parts in Mr. Deeds Goes to Town and George White's Scandals and appeared in Up the River.

== Personal life ==
Henley was married several times. Her first marriage was in April 1934, in which she eloped with radio personality Hugh Ernst. They divorced shortly thereafter. Her second marriage was to British automobile businessman Arthur Markham in April 1938, and they later relocated to London. Her final marriage was to William J. Begg, vice president of the Michael J Hamilburg agency in Hollywood. The family retired to Bermuda in the 1960s.

== Death ==
Henley died in her home on Smith's Island, in Bermuda, on April 25, 1996, at age 84.

== Selected filmography ==
- The Kid from Spain (1932)
- The Phantom Broadcast (1933)
- Find the Lady (1936)
