= Jack Melford =

British actor (1899–1972)

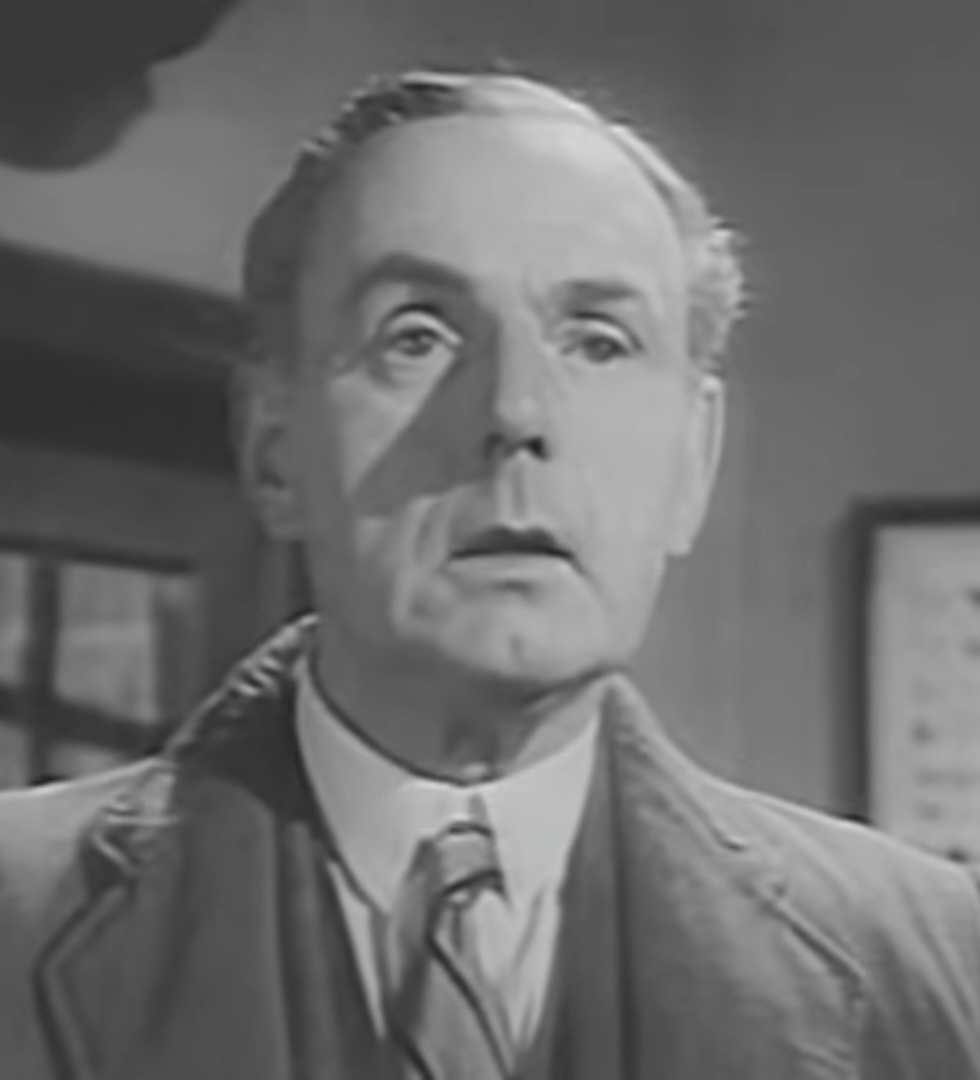
- Melford in an episode of One Step Beyond (1960)
- Born: John Kenneth George Melford Smith; 5 September 1899; London, England, UK
- Died: 22 October 1972 (aged 73); Poole, Dorset, England, UK
- Occupation: Actor
- Years active: 1911–1971

John Kenneth George Melford Smith (5 September 1899 – 22 October 1972) was a British stage, film and television actor.

== Biography ==
Melford was the younger brother of screenwriter and film director Austin Melford. On stage from the age of 12, Melford made his film debut in 1931. As well as appearing in various films and television shows, he also played Menelaus in the Doctor Who story The Myth Makers.

He appeared in Danger Man (1960) as Caldwell in "The Lonely Chair".

His daughter Jill Melford was an actress.

== Selected filmography ==
- The Sport of Kings (1931) - Sir Reginald Toothill
- Night of the Garter (1933) - Kenneth Warwick
- Department Store (1935) - Bob Burge Goodman
- Look Up and Laugh (1935) - Journalist
- Honeymoon for Three (1935) - Raymond Dirk
- Birds of a Feather (1936) - Rudolph
- Find the Lady (1936) - Schemer Doyle
- If I Were Rich (1936) - Albert Mott
- Luck of the Turf (1936) - Sid Smith
- Radio Lover (1936) - Reggie Clifford
- Jump for Glory (1937) - Thompson
- Let's Make a Night of It (1937) - Count Castelli
- Command Performance (1937) - The Journalist
- Coming of Age (1938) - Roger Squire
- Scruffy (1938) - Jim
- Hold My Hand (1938) - Pop Currie
- It's in the Air (1938) - Lt. Terry - pilot
- Many Tanks Mr. Atkins (1938) - Capt. Torrent
- Too Many Husbands (1938) - Stephen Brinkway
- The Spider (1940) - Duke
- The Briggs Family (1940) - Jerry Tulse
- Spare a Copper (1940) - Dame (uncredited)
- Crook's Tour (1941) - Desert Bus Tour Guide (uncredited)
- They Met in the Dark (1943) - Defence Lawyer at Court Martial (uncredited)
- Theatre Royal (1943) - Himself
- The Rake's Progress (1945) - Race Team Member (uncredited)
- The Laughing Lady (1946) - Lord Barrymore
- The October Man (1947) - Wilcox
- When You Come Home (1948) - Dr. Dormer Franklyn
- My Brother Jonathan (1948) - Dr. Martock
- Counterblast (1948) - Detective (uncredited)
- No Room at the Inn (1948) - Councillor Wordsworth (uncredited)
- Warning to Wantons (1949) - Maurice Lugard
- Up for the Cup (1950) - Barrowboy
- Heights of Danger (1953) - Mr. Croudson
- Background (1953) - Mackay
- The Ladykillers (1955) - Detective (uncredited)
- The End of the Line (1957) - Inspector Gates
- Web of Suspicion (1959) - (uncredited)
- Night Train for Inverness (1960) - Boy's Father (uncredited)
- Bluebeard's Ten Honeymoons (1960) - Concierge (uncredited)
- Compelled (1960) - Grimes
- Transatlantic (1960) - Capt. Brady
- Sentenced for Life (1960) - (uncredited)
- The Fourth Square (1961) - Stewart
- Feet of Clay (1961) - Soames
- Follow That Man (1961) - Lars Toren
- Hotel Incident (1962) - Max
- The Last Man Out (1962) - Sergeant-Major Knutley
- What Every Woman Wants (1962) - Dr. Falcon
- The Gentle Terror (1963) - Inspector Miles
- A Shot in the Dark (1964) - The Psycho-Analyst
- Night Train to Paris (1964) - PC inspector
- Walk a Tightrope (1964) - Bit Part
- A Home of Your Own (1965)
- Lust for a Vampire (1971) - Bishop (final film role)
