= Find the Lady (1936 film) =

1936 film

- Trade advertisement
- Directed by: Roland Gillett
- Written by: E. Lewis Waller, as Tod Waller (play); Roland Gillett; Edward Dryhurst
- Produced by: John Findlay; Roland Gillett
- Starring: Jack Melford; Althea Henley; George Sanders; Viola Compton
- Cinematography: Stanley Grant
- Edited by: Reginald Beck
- Production company: Fox Film Company
- Distributed by: Fox Film Company
- Release date: March 1936
- Running time: 70 minutes
- Country: United Kingdom
- Language: English

Find the Lady is a 1936 British comedy film directed by Roland Gillett and starring Jack Melford, Althea Henley and George Sanders. It was written by Gillett and Edward Dryhurst based on the play by E. Lewis Waller (as Tod Waller). The film was made at Wembley Studios as a quota quickie by the British subsidiary of 20th Century Fox. The sets were designed by art director William Hemsley.

== Preservation status ==
The British Film Institute National Archive holds a collection of ephemera and stills but no film or video materials.

== Plot ==
After being deported by the U.S. government, con-artist siblings Schemer and Venus Doyle return home to England and launch a fraudulent faith-healing racket. They recruit hard-up posh chap Curly Randall to join their scheme. Unlike his crooked partners, Curly genuinely believes he can heal Vilma, the paralyzed daughter of Lady Waldron. However, as Curly grows closer to Vilma, Venus becomes jealous. When Vilma undergoes a genuine, miraculous recovery, Schemer abandons the racket, while Venus and Curly, who was secretly in love with her all along, form a new business together.

== Cast ==
- Jack Melford as Schemer Doyle
- Althea Henley as Venus Doyle
- George Sanders as Curly Randall
- Viola Compton as Lady Waldron
- Violet Loxley as Vilma Waldron

== Reception ==
Kine Weekly wrote: "Tame from beginning to end, the film is just a passable quota proposition for small hails.... Jack Melford amuses at times as the wily Schemer, but he mars his performance by repeating his mannerisms and tricks. Althea Henley, easily the best of the cast, shows undoubted promise as Venus, but George Sanders bores as the sanctimonious Curly. He fails to give the character's conscience a ring of sincerity."

The Daily Film Renter wrote: "Slender story of confidence man who starts 'Cult of Happiness' racket which turns out to be power for good. Main entertainment in excellent performance by Jack Melford as shady trickster, and promising debut by Althea Henley as accomplice. Sketchy characterisation, pedestrian direction, and flimsy romantic element, but may get by as quota support for not too critical patrons."

Picturegoer wrote: "Dealing with the faith-healing racket somewhat on the lines of The Miracle Man, this picture fails to provide much in the way of entertainment value. It is too ambitious in design and too niggardly in treatment. The direction is tame and pedestrian, and is not remarkable in any department. Jack Melford is too apt to overdo his tricks and mannerisms as one of the racketeers, but Althea Henley shows very distinct promise as his sister. George Sanders is poor as the third member of the gang."
