= Scruffy (1938 film) =

British comedy by Randall Faye

- Scruffy, Jack Melford and Michael Gainsborough in the film
- Directed by: Randall Faye
- Starring: Michael Gainsborough; Jack Melford; Billy Merson
- Production company: Vulcan Pictures
- Release date: 1938
- Running time: 62 minutes
- Country: United Kingdom
- Language: English

Scruffy is a 1938 British comedy family film directed by Randall Faye and starring Jack Melford, Billy Merson and Peter Gawthorne. It was made as a quota quickie at Cricklewood Studios. A young boy runs away from his wealthy home, and thanks to his dog Scruffy, ends up living with a burglar.

== Plot ==
Young orphan Michael is adopted by rich Mrs Pottinger as a playmate for Adam, her spoilt only child. Because Mrs Pottinger does not like dogs, Michael must leave his beloved dog Scruffy behind at the orphanage. Micheal hates his new home. On Christmas Eve two of the boys from the orphanage bring Scruffy to see Michael. Michael and Scruffy run away meeting young burglar Jim. Michael moves into the barge Jim shares with his friend Golly. A policeman recognises Michael, and Jim and Golly are arrested for abduction. They promise to go straight and Michael is allowed to remain with them.

== Cast ==
- Michael Gainsborough as Michael
- Jack Melford as Jim
- Billy Merson as Golly
- Toni Edgar-Bruce as Mrs. Pottinger
- MacArthur Gordon as Hoskins
- Chris McMaster as Adam
- Peter Gawthorne as chairman
- Joan Ponsford as Judy
- Roddy McDowall as befriended boy (uncredited)
- Scruffy as himself

== Critical reception ==
The Monthly Film Bulletin wrote: "This slight and naive story is full of improbabilities. The pace is very slow, and the dialogue heavy and unnatural. In spite of these defects the film 'gets away with it' for all but the very critical. Scruffy is a most engaging mongrel; Michael Gainsborough a delightfully natural small boy, who does not attempt to act, and Jack Melford a pleasant hero. The settings include some attractive pictures of the Thames, where the barge is moored; an amusing, if unorthodox, orphanage, and a palatial country house."

The Daily Film Renter wrote: "Appealing plot develops in straightforward fashion, and Thames exteriors are prominent in locale line-up. Michael Gainsborough does well as diminutive hero, and 'Scruffy' proves engaging dog pal. ... Michael Gainsborough is an appealing Michael, Jack Melford plays the crook smoothly, and Billy Merson has little to do, but makes an impression."

Kine Weekly wrote: "Simple adventure drama, reinforced with refreshing juvenile and canine interests. There is no particular moral to the theme, but its excursions into the quizzical nevertheless promote kindly entertainment of industrial and family appeal. The young stars are good, and the adult upport and presentation are satisfactory."
