= Brandon Fleming (writer) =

British playwright and screenwriter

- Occupations: Screenwriter; Playwright
- Years active: 1924–1961 (film)

Brandon Fleming was a British playwright and screenwriter. He co-wrote the 1925 stage melodrama None But the Brave with Bernard Merivale.

== Partial filmography ==
- The Eleventh Commandment (1924)
- Mayfair Girl (1933)
- Great Stuff (1933)
- Forging Ahead (1933)
- The Flaw (1933)
- If I Were Rich (1936)
- Melody of My Heart (1936)
- Such Is Life (1936)
- All In (1936)
- There's Always a Thursday (1957)
- Alive on Saturday (1957)
- The Bank Raiders (1958)
- The Woman Eater (1958)
- Dangerous Afternoon (1961)

== Selected plays ==
- The Eleventh Commandment (1921)
- None But the Brave (1925)

== Bibliography ==
- Kabatchnik, Amnon. Blood on the Stage, 1925-1950: Milestone Plays of Crime, Mystery, and Detection. Scarecrow Press, 2010.
