= Claude Dampier =

British actor (1878–1955)

- Signed postcard
- Born: Claud Conolly Cowan; 23 November 1878; London, England
- Died: 1 January 1955 (aged 76); Ashford, Middlesex, England
- Resting place: Golders Green Crematorium
- Occupations: Actor, comedian
- Spouses: Irene Vere; Billie Carlyle
- Children: 1

Claude Dampier (born Claud Conolly Cowan; 23 November 1878 – 1 January 1955) was an English film actor and character comedian in the early 20th century.

== Life ==
Claude Dampier was born Claud Conolly Cowan on 23 November 1878 in Clapham, South London. After gaining some theatrical experience in Britain during the mid-1890s, he after toured Australia with Edward Branscombe's Dandies troupes between 1910 and 1917. He revisited the country in 1921, touring in revue shows with Hilda Attenboro, and starred in two Australian films. He also worked in South Africa.

Following an early marriage to Irene Vere, with whom he had a daughter, he married Australian actress Billie Carlyle (c1901-1991). They met whilst acting in the silent film The Adventures of Algy in 1925, and formed a double act in 1926, with Dampier billed as "The Professional Idiot". He played mostly comic roles as a dim-witted and literal-minded character. According to historian Richard Anthony Baker: "Dampier specialised in 'silly arse' characters. His face was his fortune. Chinless and with protruding teeth, it was easy to believe he was daft." Carlyle appeared as a 'straight-woman' in his act.

On one occasion while performing in New Zealand, Dampier forgot his lines and improvised by pretending to recognise an old friend, Mrs Gibson, in the audience, who then turned out not to be Mrs Gibson at all. References to the imaginary Mrs Gibson became a regular part of his performances thereafter. After Dampier returned to Britain in 1927, he featured on BBC radio, until he was temporarily banned from broadcasts after mentioning that he had "promised to squeeze Mrs Gibson's oranges."

He also appeared in more than twenty films, including Radio Parade of 1935. After the Second World War he appeared on Jewel and Warriss radio shows, where he adopted the catch-phrase "it's me-ee".

He died in 1955 and was cremated at Golders Green Crematorium in north London on 4 January 1955. His ashes lie in section 1-L of the Garden of Remembrance.

Carlyle later wrote a book, Claude Dampier, Mrs. Gibson & Me (1978). Dampier's daughter from his first marriage, Dorothy Dampier, became an actress.

== Filmography ==
- Hullo Marmaduke (1924)
- The Adventures of Algy (1925)
- Mr Stringfellow Says No (1934)
- Radio Parade of 1935 (1934)
- So You Won't Talk (1935)
- White Lilac (1935)
- No Monkey Business (1935)
- Boys Will Be Boys (1935)
- Such Is Life (1936)
- All In (1936)
- Public Nuisance No. 1 (1936)
- King of the Castle (1936)
- She Knew What She Wanted (1936)
- Sing as You Swing (1937)
- Wanted! (1937)
- She Shall Have Music (1937)
- Riding High (1937)
- The Backyard Front (1940 Dig for Victory film)
- Don't Take It to Heart (1944)
- Let's Have a Murder (1950)
- Meet Mr. Malcolm (1954)
