= 1936 in music =

This is a list of notable events in music that took place in the year 1936.

== Specific locations ==
- 1936 in British music
- 1936 in Norwegian music

== Specific genres ==
- 1936 in country music
- 1936 in jazz

== Events ==
- January 4 – Billboard magazine publishes its first music hit parade
- January 28 – An article "Muddle Instead of Music" is published anonymously, almost certainly with Stalin's approval, in the Soviet newspaper Pravda, denouncing Dmitri Shostakovich's opera Lady Macbeth of the Mtsensk District.
- March 28 – Inaugural concert of the São Paulo City Symphony Orchestra, conducted by Ernst Mehlich
- April 19 – In Barcelona, Alban Berg's Violin Concerto is given its premiere, by Louis Krasner
- May 2 – Peter and the Wolf (Петя и волк, Petya i volk), a Russian fairy tale of Sergei Prokofiev's composition, is premiered at the Nezlobin Theater in Moscow, Soviet Union, but attracts little attention at this time.
- May – Shostakovich completes composition of his Symphony No. 4, but is persuaded to withdraw it from its planned premiere on December 11 and it is not first performed until 1961.
- December 24 – Release of the film Natalka Poltavka in Ukraine, the first filmed Russian opera.
- Nat King Cole's recording career begins.
- Count Basie begins recording with his own band, which includes Lester Young.
- José Iturbi becomes conductor of the Rochester Philharmonic Orchestra in the United States.
- John Serry Sr. begins extended appearances at the Star Light Roof in the Waldorf Astoria Hotel with the Lester Lanin Orchestra in New York City.

== Published popular music ==
- "At The Codfish Ball" words: Sidney D. Mitchell, music: Lew Pollack. Introduced by Shirley Temple and Buddy Ebsen in the film Captain January
- "Awake in a Dream" w. Leo Robin m. Frederick Hollander. Introduced by Marlene Dietrich in the film Desire.
- "Bojangles Of Harlem" w. Dorothy Fields m. Jerome Kern. Introduced by Fred Astaire in the film Swing Time.
- "By Strauss" w. Ira Gershwin m. George Gershwin. Introduced by Gracie Barrie and Robert Shafter in the revue The Show Is On
- "Christopher Columbus" w. Andy Razaf m. Leon Berry
- "Cloudy" m. Mary Lou Williams
- "Cool Water" w.m. Bob Nolan
- "Does Your Heart Beat For Me?" w. Mitchell Parish m. Russ Morgan
- "Down in the Depths (On the Ninetieth Floor)" w.m. Cole Porter. Introduced by Ethel Merman in the musical Red, Hot and Blue.
- "Easy To Love" w.m. Cole Porter. Introduced by James Stewart and reprised by Frances Langford in the film Born to Dance
- "Empty Saddles (in the Old Corral)" w. J. Keirn Brennan m. Billy Hill
- "Everybody Swing" w. Sidney Clare m. Harry Akst
- "Fancy Meeting You" w. E. Y. Harburg m. Harold Arlen. Introduced by Dick Powell and Jeanne Madden in the film Stage Struck.
- "Farewell To Dreams" w. Gus Kahn m. Sigmund Romberg
- "A Fine Romance" w. Dorothy Fields m. Jerome Kern. Introduced by Fred Astaire and Ginger Rogers in the film Swing Time.
- "Gee! But You're Swell" w. Charles Tobias m. Abel Baer
- "Get Thee Behind Me Satan" w.m. Irving Berlin. Introduced by Harriet Hilliard in the film Follow the Fleet
- "Glad To Be Unhappy" w. Lorenz Hart m. Richard Rodgers. Introduced by Doris Carson and David Morris in the musical On Your Toes
- "Gloomy Sunday" w. (Eng) Sam M. Lewis m. Rezső Seress
- "The Glory of Love" w.m. Billy Hill
- "Goodnight, Irene" w.m. Huddie "Leadbelly" Ledbetter
- "Goodnight My Love" w. Harry Revel m. Mack Gordon
- "Goody Goody" w.m. Johnny Mercer & Matty Malneck
- "Has Anybody Seen Our Ship?" w.m. Noël Coward
- "He Ain't Got Rhythm" w.m. Irving Berlin. Introduced by Alice Faye in the film On the Avenue.
- "He Hasn't a Thing Except Me" w. Ira Gershwin m. Vernon Duke. Introduced by Fanny Brice in the revue Ziegfeld Follies of 1936.
- "I Can't Escape From You" w.m. Leo Robin & Richard A. Whiting. Introduced by Bing Crosby in the film Rhythm on the Range.
- "I Love To Sing-a" w. E. Y. Harburg m. Harold Arlen. Introduced by Al Jolson and Cab Calloway in the film The Singing Kid.
- "If I Should Lose You" w. Leo Robin m. Ralph Rainger. Introduced by Gladys Swarthout and John Boles in the film Rose of the Rancho.
- "I'm an Old Cowhand (From the Rio Grande)" w.m. Johnny Mercer. Introduced by Bing Crosby in the film Rhythm on the Range.
- "I'm in the Mood for Love" Introduced by Darla Hood in a clubhouse and Carl "Alfalfa" Switzer on a radio in the Our Gang (Little Rascals) short, The Pinch Singer (1936).
- "I'm Putting All My Eggs in One Basket" w.m. Irving Berlin. Introduced by Fred Astaire and Ginger Rogers in the film Follow the Fleet.
- "In the Chapel in the Moonlight" w.m. Billy Hill
- "Is It True What They Say About Dixie?" w. Irving Caesar & Sammy Lerner
- "It's a Sin to Tell a Lie" w.m. Billy Mayhew
- "It's De-Lovely" w.m. Cole Porter. Introduced by Ethel Merman and Bob Hope in the musical Red, Hot and Blue
- "It's Got to Be Love" w. Lorenz Hart m. Richard Rodgers. Introduced by Ray Bolger and Doris Carson in the musical On Your Toes.
- "I've Got a Feelin' You're Foolin'" w. Arthur Freed m. Nacio Herb Brown
- "I've Got You Under My Skin" w.m. Cole Porter. Introduced by Virginia Bruce in the film Born to Dance.
- "Keep a Twinkle In Your Eye" Johnny Mercer, Rube Bloom
- "Let Yourself Go" w.m. Irving Berlin. Introduced by Ginger Rogers in the film Follow the Fleet
- "Let's Call a Heart a Heart" w. Johnny Burke m. Arthur Johnston from the film Pennies From Heaven
- "Let's Face the Music and Dance" w.m. Irving Berlin. Introduced by Fred Astaire in the film Follow the Fleet.
- "Life Begins at Forty" Yellen, Shapiro
- "Little Old Lady" w. Stanley Adams m. Hoagy Carmichael
- "Me and the Moon" w. Walter Hirsch m. Lou Handman
- "Moonburn" w. Edward Heyman m. Hoagy Carmichael. Introduced by Bing Crosby in the film Anything Goes
- "Moonlight and Shadows" w. Leo Robin m. Frederick Hollander. Introduced by Dorothy Lamour in the film The Jungle Princess
- "Music in May" w. Christopher Hassall m. Ivor Novello. Introduced by Dorothy Dickson in the musical Careless Rapture
- "Never Gonna Dance" w. Dorothy Fields m. Jerome Kern. Introduced by Fred Astaire in the film Swing Time
- "On The Beach At Bali-Bali" w.m. Al Sherman, Jack Meskill & Abner Silver
- "One, Two, Button Your Shoe" w. Johnny Burke m. Arthur Johnston
- "Oooh! Look-A There, Ain't She Pretty?" w. Clarence Todd m. Carmen Lombardo
- "Organ Grinder's Swing" w. Mitchell Parish & Irving Mills m. Will Hudson
- "Pennies from Heaven" w. Johnny Burke m. Arthur Johnston
- "Pick Yourself Up" w. Dorothy Fields m. Jerome Kern. Introduced by Fred Astaire and Ginger Rogers in the film Swing Time
- "Play, Orchestra, Play" w.m. Noël Coward
- "Poinciana" w. (Sp) Manuel Lliso (Eng) Buddy Bernier m. Nat Simon
- "Poor Little Angeline" w.m. Will Grosz & Jimmy Kennedy
- "Rainbow on the River" w. Paul Francis Webster m. Louis Alter
- "Ridin' High" w.m. Cole Porter
- "San Francisco" w. Gus Kahn m. Bronislaw Kaper & Walter Jurmann
- "Sing Me A Swing Song" w. Stanley Adams m. Hoagy Carmichael
- "Sing, Sing, Sing" w.m. Louis Prima
- "Slaughter on Tenth Avenue" m. Richard Rodgers
- "There's A Bridle Hangin' On The Wall" w.m. Carson Robison
- "There's a Small Hotel" w. Lorenz Hart m. Richard Rodgers
- "Too Good for the Average Man" w. Lorenz Hart m. Richard Rodgers
- "The Touch Of Your Lips" w.m. Ray Noble
- Until the Real Thing Comes Along w. Sammy Cahn, Mann Holiner m. Saul Chaplin, Alberta Nichols, L.E. Freeman. (A substantially different version of the song by Nichols and Holiner appeared in the 1931 Broadway revue Rhapsody in Black as "Till the Real Thing Comes Along".)
- "Waltz In Swingtime" w. Dorothy Fields m. Jerome Kern
- "The Way You Look Tonight" w. Dorothy Fields m. Jerome Kern. Introduced by Fred Astaire in the film Swing Time
- "We Saw The Sea" w.m. Irving Berlin. Introduced by Fred Astaire in the film Follow the Fleet
- "When Did You Leave Heaven?" w. Walter Bullock m. Richard A. Whiting
- "When I'm With You" w. Mack Gordon m. Harry Revel. Introduced by Shirley Temple and Tony Martin in the film Poor Little Rich Girl.
- "When My Dreamboat Comes Home" w.m. Cliff Friend & Dave Franklin
- "The Window Cleaner" George Formby, Gifford, Cliffe
- "With My Shillelagh Under My Arm" w.m. Billy O'Brien & Raymond Wallace
- "With Plenty of Money and You" w. Al Dubin m. Harry Warren
- "Would You?" w. Arthur Freed m. Nacio Herb Brown
- "You (Gee But You're Wonderful)" w. Harold Adamson m. Walter Donaldson
- "You Gotta S-M-I-L-E to Be H-A-P-P-Y" w.m. Mack Gordon & Harry Revel
- "You Turned The Tables On Me" w. Sidney D. Mitchell m. Louis Alter
- "You Were There" w.m. Noël Coward
- "(If You Can't Sing It) You'll Have to Swing It (Mr. Paganini)" w.m. Sam Coslow

== Top popular recordings 1936 ==
The twenty popular records listed below were extracted from Joel Whitburn's Pop Memories 1890-1954, record sales reported on the "Discography of American Historical Recordings" website, and other sources as specified. Numerical rankings are approximate, they are only used as a frame of reference.

Rank	Artist	Title	Label	Recorded	Released	Chart positions
1	Bing Crosby	"Pennies from Heaven"	Decca 947	July 24, 1936	November 1936	US BB 1936 #1, US #1 for 10 weeks, 15 total weeks, Grammy Hall of Fame 2004, Jazz Standards 1936
2	Fred Astaire	"The Way You Look To-night"	Brunswick 7717	July 26, 1936	August 1936	US BB 1936 #2, US #1 for 6 weeks, 17 total weeks, Grammy Hall of Fame 1998, Jazz Standards 1936
3	Benny Goodman and His Orchestra (Vocal Helen Ward)	"The Glory Of Love"	Victor 25316	April 23, 1936	May 6, 1936	US BB 1936 #3, US #1 for 6 weeks, 15 total weeks
4	Tommy Dorsey and His Orchestra	"Alone"	Victor 25191	November 7, 1935	December 1935	US BB 1936 #4, US #1 for 6 weeks, 14 total weeks
5	Benny Goodman and His Orchestra (Vocal Helen Ward)	"Goody Goody"	Victor 25245	January 24, 1936	February 1936	US BB 1936 #5, US #1 for 6 weeks, 13 total weeks
6	Fred Astaire	"A Fine Romance"	Brunswick 7716	July 28, 1936	August 1936	US BB 1936 #6, US #1 for 5 weeks, 12 total weeks
7	Tommy Dorsey and His Clambake Seven	"The Music Goes Round and Round"	Victor 25201	May 25, 1936	August 1936	US BB 1936 #7, US #1 for 5 weeks, 9 total weeks
8	Shep Fields and His Rippling Rhythm Orchestra	"Did I Remember?"	Bluebird 6476	July 3, 1936	July 31, 1936	US BB 1936 #8, US #1 for 4 weeks, 12 total weeks
9	Fats Waller and his Rhythm	"It's a Sin to Tell a Lie"	Victor 25342	June 5, 1936	June 17, 1936	US BB 1936 #9, US #1 for 4 weeks, 12 total weeks
10	Jimmy Dorsey and His Orchestra	"Is It True What They Say About Dixie?"	Decca 768	March 29, 1936	August 1936	US BB 1936 #10, US #1 for 3 weeks, 12 total weeks
11	Jan Garber and His Orchestra	"Melody from the Sky"	Decca 761	February 27, 1936	April 1936	US BB 1936 #11, US #1 for 3 weeks, 11 total weeks
12	Eddy Duchin and His Orchestra	"Moon Over Miami"	Victor 25212	December 23, 1935	December 27, 1935	US BB 1936 #12, US #1 for 3 weeks, 11 total weeks
13	Riley-Farley and their Onyx Club Band	"The Music Goes 'Round and Around"	Decca 578	October 24, 1935	November 1935	US BB 1936 #13, US #1 for 2 weeks, 15 total weeks, 100,000 sales
14	Shep Fields and His Rippling Rhythm Orchestra	"In the Chapel in the Moonlight"	Bluebird 6640	October 22, 1936	November 4, 1936	US BB 1936 #14, US #1 for 2 weeks, 15 total weeks
15	Hal Kemp and His Orchestra	"There's a Small Hotel"	Brunswick 7634	March 12, 1936	April 1936	US BB 1936 #15, US #1 for 2 weeks, 15 total weeks
16	Guy Lombardo and His Royal Canadians	"When Did You Leave Heaven"	Victor 25357	July 2, 1936	July 17, 1936	US BB 1936 #16, US #1 for 2 weeks, 15 total weeks
17	Jan Garber and His Orchestra	"A Beautiful Lady in Blue"	Decca 651	December 16, 1935	January 1936	US BB 1936 #17, US #1 for 2 weeks, 14 total weeks
18	Benny Goodman and His Orchestra (Vocal Helen Ward)	"It's Been So Long"	Victor 25245	January 24, 1936	February 1936	US BB 1936 #18, US #1 for 2 weeks, 14 total weeks
19	Benny Goodman and His Orchestra (Vocal Helen Ward)	"These Foolish Things Remind Me of You"	Victor 25351	June 15, 1936	July 1, 1936	US BB 1936 #19, US #1 for 2 weeks, 13 total weeks, Jazz Standards 1935
20	Hal Kemp and His Orchestra	"When I'm with You"	Brunswick 7681	May 13, 1936	July 1936	US BB 1936 #20, US #1 for 2 weeks, 13 total weeks

== Classical music ==
=== Premieres ===
Composer	Composition	Date	Location	Performers
Barber, Samuel	String Quartet	1936-12-14	Rome	Pro Arte Quartet
Barber, Samuel	Symphony in One Movement (Symphony No. 1)	1936-12-13	Rome	Augusteo Philharmonic – Molinari
Berg, Alban	Violin Concerto	1936-04-19	Barcelona (ISCM)	Krasner / Pau Casals Orchestra – Scherchen
Britten, Benjamin	Three Divertimenti for String Quartet	1936-02-25	London	Stratton Quartet
Britten, Benjamin	Our Hunting Fathers	1936-09-25	Norwich, UK	Wyss / London Philharmonic – Britten
Britten, Benjamin	Suite for Violin and Piano	1936-04-21	Barcelona (ISCM)	Brosa, Britten
Britten, Benjamin	Temporal Variations	1936-12-12	London	Caine, Hallis
Chávez, Carlos	Sinfonía india (Symphony No. 2)	1936-04-10	Boston	Boston Symphony – Chávez
Copland, Aaron	Statements	1936-01-09	Minneapolis	Minneapolis Symphony
Dallapiccola, Luigi	Musica per tre pianoforti	1936-03-30	Geneva	Dallapiccola, Orloff, Pasche
Diamond, David	Psalm for Orchestra	1936-12-10	Rochester, New York	Rochester Philharmonic – Hanson
George Enescu	Sonata No. 2 for cello and piano, Op. 26, No. 2	1936-3-4	Paris	Alexanian, Enescu
Gershwin, George	Catfish Row	1936-01-21	Philadelphia	Philadelphia Orchestra – Smallens
Hindemith, Paul	Trauermusik	1936-01-21	London	Hindemith / BBC Symphony – Boult
Ifukube, Akira	Japanese Rhapsody	1936-04-05	Boston	Boston Symphony – Sevitzky
Jolivet, André	Andante for Strings	1936-05-25	Paris	Jane Evrard Orchestra
Jolivet, André	Danse incantatoire	1936-06-03	Paris	Paris Symphony – Désormière
Jolivet, André	Prélude apocalyptique	1936-12-06	Paris	Messiaen
Kabalevsky, Dmitri	Piano Concerto No. 2	1936-05-12	Moscow	[Unknown performers]
Kodály, Zoltán	Budavári Te Deum	1936-09-02	Budapest	Ritter, Kisfaludy, Laczó, Mezey, Varhelyi / St. Matthew Church – Sugár
Krenek, Ernst	Fragment from Karl V	1936-04-19	Barcelona (ISCM)	Meyer / Pau Casals Orchestra – Ansermet
Lambert, Constant	Summer's Last Will and Testament	1936-01-29	London	Henderson / Philharmonic Choir, BBC Symphony – Lambert
Louis Lavater	'By Starlight' Serenade for piano and string	1936	Melbourne	unknown orchestra
Martinů, Bohuslav	Concerto for Flute, Violin and Chamber Orch.	1936-12-27	Paris	M. Moyse, B. Moyse / Paris Concerts Society Orchestra – Gaubert
Messiaen, Olivier	Pièce pour le tombeau de Paul Dukas	1936-04-25	Paris	Nin-Culmell
Messiaen, Olivier	Vocalise-Étude	1936-05-18	Paris	Quéru-Bedel, Messiaen
Myaskovsky, Nikolai	Aviation Symphony (Symphony No. 16)	1936-10-24	Moscow	Moscow Philharmonic – Szenkar
Prokofiev, Sergei	Peter and the Wolf	1936-05-02	Moscow	Moscow Philharmonic – Prokofiev
Prokofiev, Sergei	Suite No. 1 from Romeo and Juliet	1936-11-24	Moscow	Moscow Philharmonic – Sebestyén
Rachmaninoff, Sergei	Symphony No. 3	1936-11-06	Philadelphia	Philadelphia Orchestra – Stokowski
Revueltas, Silvestre	Homenaje a Federico García Lorca	1936-11-14	Mexico City	Musicians from the National Conservatory – Revueltas
Strauss, Richard	Olympische Hymne	1936-08-01	Berlin (Olympics)	Berlin Philharmonic, National Socialist Symphony – Strauss
Varèse, Edgard	Density 21.5	1936-02-16	New York City	Barrère
Vaughan Williams, Ralph	Dona nobis pacem	1936-10-02	Huddersfield, UK	Flynn, Henderson / Huddersfield Society, Hallé Orchestra – Coates

=== Compositions ===
- Grażyna Bacewicz – Trio for Oboe, Violin and Piano
- Samuel Barber –
  - Symphony No. 1, Op. 9
  - String Quartet, Op. 11
- Béla Bartók – Music for Strings, Percussion and Celesta
- Arnold Bax –
  - Threnody and Scherzo
  - String Quartet No. 3 in F major
- Ernest Bloch – Voice in the Wilderness
- Benjamin Britten – Three Divertimenti for String Quartet
- Carlos Chávez – Sinfonía india (Symphony No. 2)
- Aaron Copland – El Salón México
- Henry Cowell – String Quartet No. 4, "United"
- David Diamond –
  - Violin Concerto No. 1
  - Concerto for String Quartet
- John Fernström – Clarinet Concerto
- Berthold Goldschmidt – String Quartet No. 2
- Paul Hindemith – Trauermusik (Funeral Music)
- Alan Hovhaness – Cello Concerto
- Aram Khachaturian – Piano Concerto
- Bohuslav Martinů – Concerto for Flute, Violin and Chamber Orchestra
- Olivier Messiaen – Poèmes pour Mi, song cycle for piano and soprano
- Sergei Prokofiev –
  - Peter and the Wolf, for narrator and orchestra
  - Romeo and Juliet (ballet)
  - Russian Overture for orchestra
- Sergei Rachmaninoff – Symphony No. 3
- Albert Roussel – Concertino for Cello and Orchestra
- Edmund Rubbra –
  - Sinfonia Concertante
  - Symphony No. 1, Op. 44
- Arnold Schoenberg –
  - Violin Concerto, Op. 36 (1935–36)
  - String Quartet No. 4, Op. 37
- Roger Sessions – String Quartet No. 1
- Dmitri Shostakovich – Symphony No. 4 in C minor, Op. 43 (1935–1936)
- Edgard Varèse – Density 21.5
- Ralph Vaughan Williams – Dona Nobis Pacem
- Anton Webern – Variations for Piano (1935–1936)
- Percy Whitlock – Sonata for Organ in C minor

== Opera ==
- Franco Alfano – Cyrano de Bergerac
- George Enescu – Œdipe, op. 23 (completed by 1931); first staged March 13, 1935, at the Paris Opera
- Emmerich Kálmán – Kaiserin Josephine
- Bohuslav Martinů – Divadlo za branou (Theater Behind the Gate)
- Gian Carlo Menotti – Amelia Goes to the Ball

== Film ==
- Arthur Bliss – Things to Come
- Benjamin Britten – Peace of Britain
- Benjamin Britten – The Way to the Sea
- Erich Korngold – Anthony Adverse

== Musical theatre ==
- Balalaika London production opened at the Adelphi Theatre on December 22 and ran for 570 performances.
- Careless Rapture (Ivor Novello) – London production opened at the Theatre Royal on September 11 and ran for 295 performances.
- New Faces Of 1936 Broadway revue opened at the Vanderbilt Theatre on May 19 and ran for 193 performances.
- On Your Toes Broadway production opened on April 11 at the Imperial Theatre and ran for 315 performances.
- Over She Goes (Music: Billy Mayerl Lyrics: Desmond Carter & Frank Eyton Book: Stanley Lupino) London production opened at the Saville Theatre on September 23 and ran for 248 performances
- Red, Hot and Blue Broadway production opened on October 29 at the Alvin Theatre and ran for 183 performances.
- The Show Is On Broadway revue opened at the Winter Garden Theatre on December 25 and ran for 237 performances.
- Swing Along London production opened at the Gaiety Theatre on September 2 and ran for 311 performances
- This'll Make You Whistle London production opened at the Palace Theatre on September 15 and transferred to Daly's Theatre on January 21, 1937, for a total run of 190 performances. Starred Jack Buchanan and Elsie Randolph
- Tonight at 8.30 London production opened at the Phoenix Theatre on January 9 and ran for 157 performances.
- The White Horse Inn Broadway production opened on October 1 at the Center Theatre and ran for 223 performances.

== Musical films ==
- Anything Goes starring Bing Crosby and Ethel Merman
- Born to Dance released November 27 starring Eleanor Powell, Virginia Bruce, James Stewart, Frances Langford, Buddy Ebsen and the vocal group The Foursome.
- Cain and Mabel starring Marion Davies, Clark Gable and Allen Jenkins
- Can This Be Dixie? starring Jane Withers, Slim Summerville, Helen Wood and Thomas Beck. Directed by George Marshall
- Captain January starring Shirley Temple, Guy Kibbee and Slim Summerville. Directed by David Butler.
- Circus, starring Lyubov Orlova and directed by Grigori Aleksandrov, with music by Isaak Dunayevsky
- Collegiate released January 22 starring Jack Oakie and Frances Langford and featuring songwriters Mack Gordon and Harry Revel.
- Dancing Pirate starring Charles Collins, Frank Morgan and Steffi Duna
- Everybody Dance starring Cicely Courtneidge
- Everything Is Rhythm starring Harry Roy and Princess Pearl and featuring Mabel Mercer
- Follow the Fleet starring Fred Astaire and Ginger Rogers
- The Great Ziegfeld starring William Powell, Myrna Loy, Luise Rainer, Frank Morgan, Fanny Brice, Virginia Bruce and Ray Bolger.
- Hats Off starring Mae Clark and John Payne. Directed by Boris Petroff.
- Her Master's Voice starring Edward Everett Horton and Peggy Conklin
- King of Burlesque starring Alice Faye, Jack Oakie and Warner Baxter and featuring Fats Waller and Kenny Baker
- Pigskin Parade starring Stuart Erwin, Patsy Kelly, Jack Haley, Betty Grable, Dixie Dunbar and Judy Garland and featuring The Yacht Club Boys
- Poor Little Rich Girl released July 24 starring Shirley Temple, Alice Faye, Jack Haley and featuring Tony Martin.
- Public Nuisance No. 1 starring Frances Day.
- Rhythm on the Range released July 1 starring Bing Crosby and Frances Farmer.
- Rose-Marie starring Jeanette MacDonald and Nelson Eddy
- Show Boat starring Irene Dunne, Allan Jones, Helen Morgan, Paul Robeson and Hattie McDaniel
- Soft Lights and Sweet Music, film revue featuring Ambrose & his Orchestra, Evelyn Dall, Turner Layton and Elisabeth Welch
- Stage Struck starring Dick Powell, Joan Blondell, Frank McHugh, Jeanne Madden and The Yacht Club Boys.
- Suzy starring Jean Harlow, Franchot Tone, Cary Grant and Inez Courtney
- Swing Time starring Fred Astaire and Ginger Rogers
- Three Smart Girls
- Variety Parade

== Published Writings ==
- Spaeth, Sigmund (1936). Great Symphonies: How to Recognize and Remember Them. New York: Gard City Publishing Co., Inc.

== Births ==
- January 2
  - Iván Erőd, Hungarian-Austrian composer and pianist (died 2019)
  - Roger Miller, American country singer (died 1992)
- January 8 – Zdeněk Mácal, Czech-American conductor (died 2023)
- January 12 – Raimonds Pauls, Latvian composer and piano player
- January 13 – Renato Bruson, Italian baritone
- January 14 – Clarence Carter, American soul singer
- January 19 – Tonny Koeswoyo, Indonesian rock musician (died 1987)
- January 23 – Cécile Ousset, French pianist
- January 24
  - Doug Kershaw, American fiddle player
  - Jack Scott, Canadian-born American rock singer-songwriter (died 2019)
  - Bobby Wellins, Scottish saxophonist (died 2016)
- January 29
  - Malcolm Binns, British classical pianist
- February 6 – Donnie Brooks, singer (died 2007)
- February 8 – Larry Verne, American novelty singer (died 2013)
- February 9 – Stompin' Tom Connors, folk musician (died 2013)
- February 15 – Richard Jackson, musicologist
- February 19 – Bob Engermann (The Lettermen) (died 2013)
- February 22 – Ernie K-Doe, R&B singer (died 2001)
- February 24 – Luis Aguilé, Argentine singer-songwriter and actor (died 2009)
- March 4 – Aribert Reimann, pianist and composer (died 2024)
- March 6 – Elmira Zherzdeva, Soviet singer and voice actress
- March 17 – Ladislav Kupkovič, composer (died 2016)
- c. March 20 – Lee "Scratch" Perry, reggae artist, composer (died 2021)
- March 22 – Roger Whittaker, singer-songwriter (died 2023)
- March 26 – Fred Parris (The Five Satins) (died 2022)
- March 29 – Richard Rodney Bennett, composer and pianist (died 2012)
- April 10 – Bobby Smith, R&B singer (The Spinners) (died 2013)
- April 13 – Dieter Klöcker, clarinetist (died 2011)
- April 17 – Alexander Walton (Pete Graves), R&B singer (The Moonglows) (died 2006)
- April 22 – Glen Campbell, country singer (The Beach Boys) (died 2017)
- April 23 – Roy Orbison, singer-songwriter (died 1988)
- April 29 – Zubin Mehta, conductor
- May 2 – Engelbert Humperdinck, born Arnold George Dorsey, pop singer
- May 6 – Sylvia Robinson, hip hop singer (Mickey & Sylvia) (died 2011)
- May 14 – Bobby Darin, singer (died 1973)
- May 23 – Ingeborg Hallstein, German opera singer
- May 24 – Harold Budd, American avant-garde composer (died 2020)
- May 25 – Tom T. Hall, country singer-songwriter (died 2021)
- May 28 – Maki Ishii, Japanese composer (died 2003)
- June 1 – Edith Barr, Peruvian singer (died 2026)
- June 6 – Levi Stubbs, American vocalist (Four Tops) (died 2008)
- June 8 – James Darren, American actor and singer (died 2024)
- June 15 – Alexandru Hrisanide, Romanian pianist and composer (died 2018)
- June 19
  - Tommy DeVito, American rock singer (The Four Seasons) (died 2020)
  - Shirley Goodman, American R&B singer (Shirley & Lee, Shirley & Company) (died 2005)
- June 20 – Billy Guy, American R&B singer (The Coasters) (died 2002)
- June 22
  - Kris Kristofferson, American country singer-songwriter and film actor (died 2024)
  - Hermeto Pascoal, Brazilian composer and instrumentalist
- June 30 – Dave Van Ronk, American folk singer (died 2002)
- July 10 – David Zinman, violinist and conductor
- July 13 – Vaza Azarasvili, Georgian composer
- July 30 – Buddy Guy, blues guitarist
- August 4 – Elsbeary Hobbs (The Drifters) (died 1996)
- August 7 – Charles Pope (The Tams) (died 2013)
- August 23 – Rudy Lewis (The Drifters) (died 1964)
- August 29 – Gilbert Amy, French composer and conductor
- August 31 – Igor Zhukov, Russian pianist (died 2018)
- September 7
  - Buddy Holly, rock and roll singer-songwriter (died 1959)
  - George Cassidy, Northern Irish tenor saxophonist (died 2023)
- September 9 – Jerrold Immel, American television music composer
- September 14 – John Boyden, classical music administrator (died 2021)
- September 18 – Big Tom, Irish country music singer (died 2018)
- September 21 – Dickey Lee, country singer-songwriter
- October 3 – Steve Reich, American minimalist composer
- October 7 – Charles Dutoit, Swiss conductor
- October 24 – Bill Wyman, English rock bassist and producer (The Rolling Stones)
- October 26 – György Pauk, Hungarian violinist (died 2024)
- October 28
  - Charlie Daniels, American Southern rock singer-songwriter and string player (died 2020)
  - Carl Davis, American-born British film and TV composer and conductor (died 2023)
- November 11 – Jack Keller, songwriter (died 2005)
- November 14
  - Antonio Gades, flamenco dancer (died 2004)
  - Cornell Gunter, R&B singer (The Coasters, The Flairs) (died 1990)
- November 15 – Aleksey Zubov, Russian jazz saxophonist and composer (died 2021)
- November 18 – Don Cherry, jazz musician (died 1995)
- November 19 – Ray Collins, rock musician (The Mothers of Invention) (died 2012)
- November 22 – Hans Zender, conductor (died 2019)
- December 14 – Arve Tellefsen, violinist
- December 17
  - Tommy Banks, Canadian jazz pianist, composer and politician (died 2018)
  - Tommy Steele, British pop singer

== Deaths ==
- January 1 – Harry B. Smith, US songwriter, 75
- January 2 – Earl Burtnett, bandleader and songwriter, 39
- January 7 – Guy d'Hardelot, composer and pianist, 77
- January 22 – Louis Glass, composer, 71
- January 23 – Dame Clara Butt, contralto opera singer, 63
- January 25 – Hermann Bischoff, composer, 68
- February 11 – Florence Smithson, singer, 51.
- March 6 – Rubin Goldmark, pianist and composer, 63
- March 21 – Alexander Glazunov, composer, 70
- March 26 – Maximilian Maksakov, opera singer (born 1869)
- April 7 – Marilyn Miller, US actress, dancer and singer, 37
- April 18 – Ottorino Respighi, composer, 56
- April 24 – Bernard van Dieren, composer, 48
- May 5 – Eva von der Osten, operatic soprano, 54
- May 24 – Claudia Muzio, opera singer, 47
- May 25 – Ján Levoslav Bella, composer and conductor, 92
- June 4 – Mathilde Verne, English pianist and educator, 71
- June 27 – Mike Bernard, ragtime musician, 61
- August 15 – Sir Henry Lytton, Gilbert & Sullivan comic baritone singer and actor, 71
- August 19 – Harry Plunket Greene, baritone concert singer, 71
- August 28 – Albert Périlhou, French composer, organist and pianist, 90
- September 5 – Béla Szabados, composer, 69
- September 11 – Byron G. Harlan, singer, 75
- October 11 – Antonio José Martínez Palacios, Spanish composer, 33
- October 22 – Anne Caldwell, playwright and lyricist, 68
- November 11 – Sir Edward German, composer, 74
- November 17 – Ernestine Schumann-Heink, contralto singer, 75
- December 6 – Emil Adamič, composer, 58
- December 31 – Oreste Riva, composer, 76
- Date unknown
  - Albert Gorter, conductor and composer (born 1862)
  - Herbert De Pinna, songwriter and composer (born 1883)
