= 1936 in British music =

This is a summary of 1936 in music in the United Kingdom.

== Events ==
- 4 February – Documentary film Night Mail, on which Benjamin Britten has collaborated with W. H. Auden (with score recorded in January), is premiered at the Cambridge Arts Theatre.
- 12 May – Ralph Vaughan Williams's opera The Poisoned Kiss is given its first performance by the Intimate Opera Company, conducted by Cyril Rootham, at the Cambridge Arts Theatre.
- June – Sir Malcolm Sargent courts controversy by giving an interview to The Daily Telegraph in which he says that an orchestral musician does not deserve a "job for life" and should "give of his lifeblood with every bar he plays". Musicians take offence because of their support of him during his recent recovery from tuberculosis.
- 1 September – Arthur Rubinstein plays John Ireland's Piano Concerto in E-flat major at the Proms at Queen's Hall.
- 25 September – Sophie Wyss sings the premiere of Britten's Our Hunting Fathers in Norwich, with the London Philharmonic Orchestra conducted by the composer.
- date unknown – Granville Bantock begins an affair with Muriel Mann.

== Popular music ==
- "Has Anybody Seen Our Ship?" w.m. Noël Coward
- "Let's Have A Tiddley At The Milk Bar", w.m. Noel Gay, sung by Nellie Wallace
- "The Window Cleaner", by Fred Cliff, Harry Gifford and George Formby

== Classical music: new works ==
- Arnold Bax
  - Threnody and Scherzo
  - String Quartet No. 3 in F major
- William Henry Bell – The Tumbler of Our Lady for soloists, choruses and orchestra
- Frank Bridge – Movement for String Quartet
- Benjamin Britten – Our Hunting Fathers
- Alan Bush – Concert Piece for Cello and Piano
- Erik Chisholm – The Forsaken Mermaid (ballet)
- Eric Coates – Saxo Rhapsody
- Gerald Finzi – Earth and Air and Rain
- Dorothy Gow – Oboe Quintet
- Constant Lambert – Summer's Last Will and Testament
- Haldane Stewart
  - "The Winds at Bethlehem" (carol, with words by W. M. Letts)
  - "Penned are the Sheep" (carol, with words by R. K. Davis)
- William Walton – Theme for Improvisation
- Ralph Vaughan Williams – Dona Nobis Pacem
- Percy Whitlock – Sonata for Organ in C minor

== Opera ==
- Roger Quilter – Julia

== Film and Incidental music ==
- Hubert Bath – Tudor Rose
- Allan Gray – The House of the Spaniard
- Leighton Lucas – The Cardinal

== Musical theatre ==
- 22 December – The London production of Balalaika opens at the Adelphi Theatre and runs for 570 performances.
- 11 September – Careless Rapture (Ivor Novello) opens at the Theatre Royal on and runs for 295 performances.

== Musical films ==
- Ball at Savoy, directed by Victor Hanbury, starring Conrad Nagel and Marta Labarr
- The Beloved Vagabond, directed by Curtis Bernhardt, starring Maurice Chevalier, Betty Stockfeld, Margaret Lockwood and Austin Trevor
- Dodging the Dole, directed by John E. Blakeley, starring Barry K. Barnes and Dan Young
- Everybody Dance, starring Cicely Courtneidge
- Everything Is Rhythm, starring Harry Roy and Dorothy Boyd
- The Last Waltz, starring Jarmila Novotna, Harry Welchman, and Gerald Barry
- It's Love Again, directed by Victor Saville, starring Jessie Matthews, Robert Young and Sonnie Hale.
- Limelight, directed by Herbert Wilcox, starring Anna Neagle, Arthur Tracy and Jane Winton.
- Southern Roses, directed by Frederic Zelnik, starring George Robey, Gina Malo and Chili Bouchier.

== Births ==
- 4 January – John Gorman, entertainer (The Scaffold)
- 29 January – Malcolm Binns, pianist
- 23 February – Trevor Beeton, plumber
- 22 March – Roger Whittaker, Kenyan-born singer-songwriter
- 29 March – Richard Rodney Bennett, composer and pianist (died 2012)
- 20 April – Christopher Robinson, organist and conductor
- 2 May – Engelbert Humperdinck, singer
- 7 May – Cornelius Cardew, composer and musicologist (died 1981)
- 12 May – David Snell, harpist, composer and conductor
- 25 June – Roy Williamson, folk singer-songwriter (died 1990)
- 27 June – Robin Hall, folk singer (died 1998)
- 26 July – Mary Millar, singer and actress (died 1998)
- 2 August – Anthony Payne, composer
- 7 September – George Cassidy, jazz musician and music teacher to Van Morrison (died 2023)
- 16 September – Gordon Beck, jazz pianist (died 2011)
- 24 October – Bill Wyman, rock bassist
- 5 November – Richard Drakeford, composer (died 2009)
- 14 November – Freddie Garrity, singer (Freddie and the Dreamers) (died 2006)
- 17 December – Tommy Steele, singer

== Deaths ==
- 23 January – Dame Clara Butt, operatic contralto, 63
- 11 February – Florence Smithson, singer, 51 (post-operative complications)
- 3 March – Ethel Mary Boyce, composer, pianist and teacher, 73
- 4 March – Ernest Pike, tenor, 64 (cerebral haemorrhage)
- 18 May – Alick Maclean, conductor and composer, 63
- 4 June – Mathilde Verne, pianist and teacher, 71
- 15 August – Sir Henry Lytton, Gilbert & Sullivan comic baritone, 71
- 19 August – Harry Plunket Greene, Irish baritone, 71
- 11 November – Sir Edward German, composer, 74

== See also ==
- 1936 in British television
- 1936 in the United Kingdom
- List of British films of 1936
