= Gabriel Rodó i Vergés =

Spanish cellist and composer (1904–1963)

Gabriel Rodó i Vergés (November 28, 1904 – October 17, 1963) was a Catalan cellist and composer.

Rodó was born in Barcelona and studied cello with Josep Soler i Ventura and composition with Enric Morera i Viura at the Municipal Conservatory of Barcelona.

He was principal cellist in the Orquestra Simfònica del Gran Teatre del Liceu from 1926 to 1951 and also played in the Orquestra Pau Casals. He was a professor of cello, chamber music and conducting at the Conservatori Superior de Música del Liceu from 1932.

He was appointed music director of the Orquesta Filarmónica de Gran Canaria in Las Palmas, Spain, from 1951 to 1962.

He composed several works for cello and other chamber music as well as two symphonies.

Rodó had aligned himself with the Republic during the Spanish Civil War. In 1962, under political pressure from the Franco regime, he was dismissed from his post at the Conservatory and emigrated to Colombia. He died the following year of cardiac arrest in Bogotá, where he and his wife, Lupe Sellés, were cellists in the Orquesta Sinfónica Nacional.

== Recordings ==
- Symphony No. 2 in D major (1957), Adrian Leaper, Orquesta Filarmónica de Gran Canaria, 1999, ASV
