= Nocturne (Britten) =

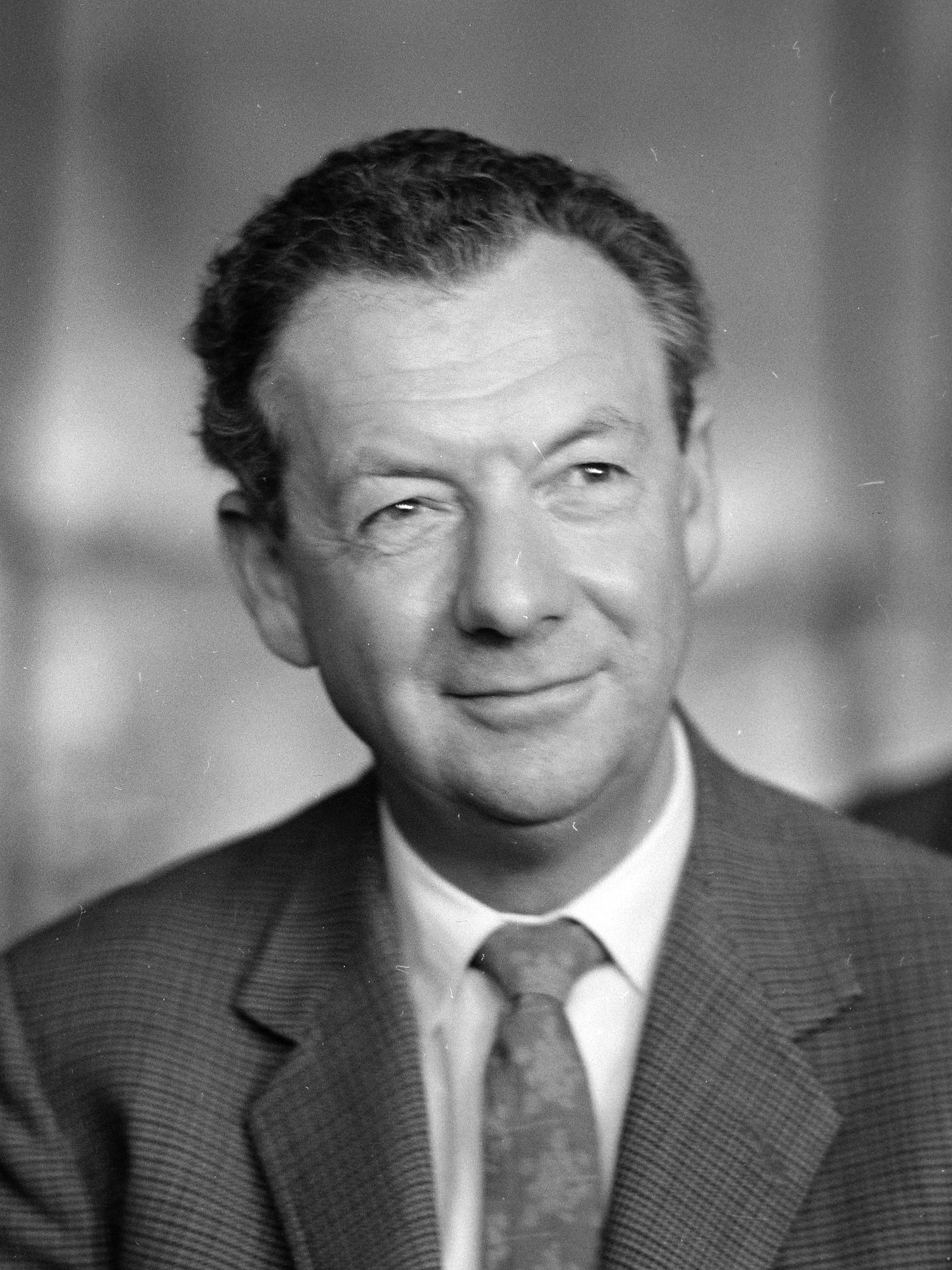
Benjamin Britten in 1965

Nocturne, Op. 60, is a song cycle by Benjamin Britten, written for tenor, seven obbligato instruments and strings. The seven instruments are flute, cor anglais, clarinet, bassoon, harp, French horn and timpani. Nocturne was Britten's fourth and final orchestral song cycle, after Our Hunting Fathers (Op. 8, 1936), Les Illuminations (Op. 18, 1939) and Serenade for Tenor, Horn and Strings (Op. 31, 1943). It was dedicated to Alma Mahler.

Nocturne was premiered in the Leeds Town Hall at the centenary Leeds Festival on 16 October 1958 by Peter Pears and the BBC Symphony Orchestra conducted by Rudolf Schwarz. Britten conducted a recording at Walthamstow Assembly Hall in 1960 with Pears, the London Symphony Orchestra and William Waterhouse (bassoon), Alexander Murray (flute), Gervase de Peyer (clarinet), Roger Lord (cor anglais), Osian Ellis (harp), Barry Tuckwell (horn), and Denis Blyth (timpani).

The theme of the piece, as its name Nocturne suggests, is sleep and darkness, both in the literal and figurative sense. In this respect, the work is reminiscent of Britten's earlier Serenade. Unlike Serenade, Nocturne is presented as a continuous piece rather than separate movements. This is emphasised by a number of figures which occur throughout, most notably the 'rocking' string motif which opens the work. The conflicting tonal relationship between C and D♭ is also evident throughout, reflecting the contrast between the untroubled and the more perturbed aspects of sleep which are also described by Britten's choice of poems.

== Structure ==
The piece sets eight sections of poetry to music, each accompanied by strings and (with the exception of the first) by an obbligato instrument:

1. Shelley – "On a Poet’s Lips I Slept" from Prometheus Unbound
2. Tennyson – "The Kraken", with bassoon
3. Coleridge – "Encinctured with a twine of leaves" from The Wanderings of Cain , with harp
4. Middleton – "Midnight Bell" from Blurt, Master Constable, with French horn
5. Wordsworth – "But that night when on my bed I lay" from The Prelude (1805), with timpani
6. Owen – "The Kind Ghosts", with cor anglais
7. Keats – "Sleep and Poetry", with flute and clarinet
8. Shakespeare – Sonnet XLIII, with all the obbligato instruments
