= 1936 in British television =

This is a list of events related to British television in 1936.

== Events ==
- 2 November – The first regular high-definition (then defined as at least 200 lines) BBC Television Service, based at Alexandra Palace in London, officially begins broadcasting (after test transmissions began in August). The service alternates on a weekly basis between Baird's 240-line mechanical system and the Marconi-EMI's 405-line all-electronic system. Programmes are broadcast daily, Monday to Saturday from 3pm to 4pm and 9pm to 10pm. Leslie Mitchell is the first announcer to be heard on the new service.

== Debuts ==
- 26 August – Radiolympia (1936)
- Unknown (probably November) – Picture Page (1936–1939, 1946–1952)
- Unknown – Theatre Parade (1936–1938)

== Continuing television shows ==
=== 1920s ===
- BBC Wimbledon (1927–1939, 1946–2019, 2021–present)

== Births ==
- 9 February – Clive Swift, actor (died 2019)
- 3 April – Tony Garnett, producer (died 2020)
- 7 April – Peter Eckersley, producer (died 1981)
- 16 April – Derrick Sherwin, producer (died 2018)
- 25 April – Richard Lindley, foreign correspondent and television regulator (died 2019)
- 9 May
  - Albert Finney, actor (died 2019)
  - Glenda Jackson, actress and politician (died 2023)
- 17 June – Ken Loach, film director
- 30 June – Don Taylor, director (died 2003)
- 8 July – Tony Warren, scriptwriter (died 2016)
- 9 July – Richard Wilson, Scottish actor
- 3 August – Edward Petherbridge, actor and writer
- 27 September – Gordon Honeycombe, news presenter (died 2015)
- 9 October – Brian Blessed, actor
- 16 October - Peter Bowles, actor (died 2022)
- 22 November – John Bird, satirical actor (died 2022)
- 22 December – James Burke, science populariser

== See also ==
- 1936 in British music
- 1936 in the United Kingdom
- List of British films of 1936
