= La Neuveville =

- Municipality
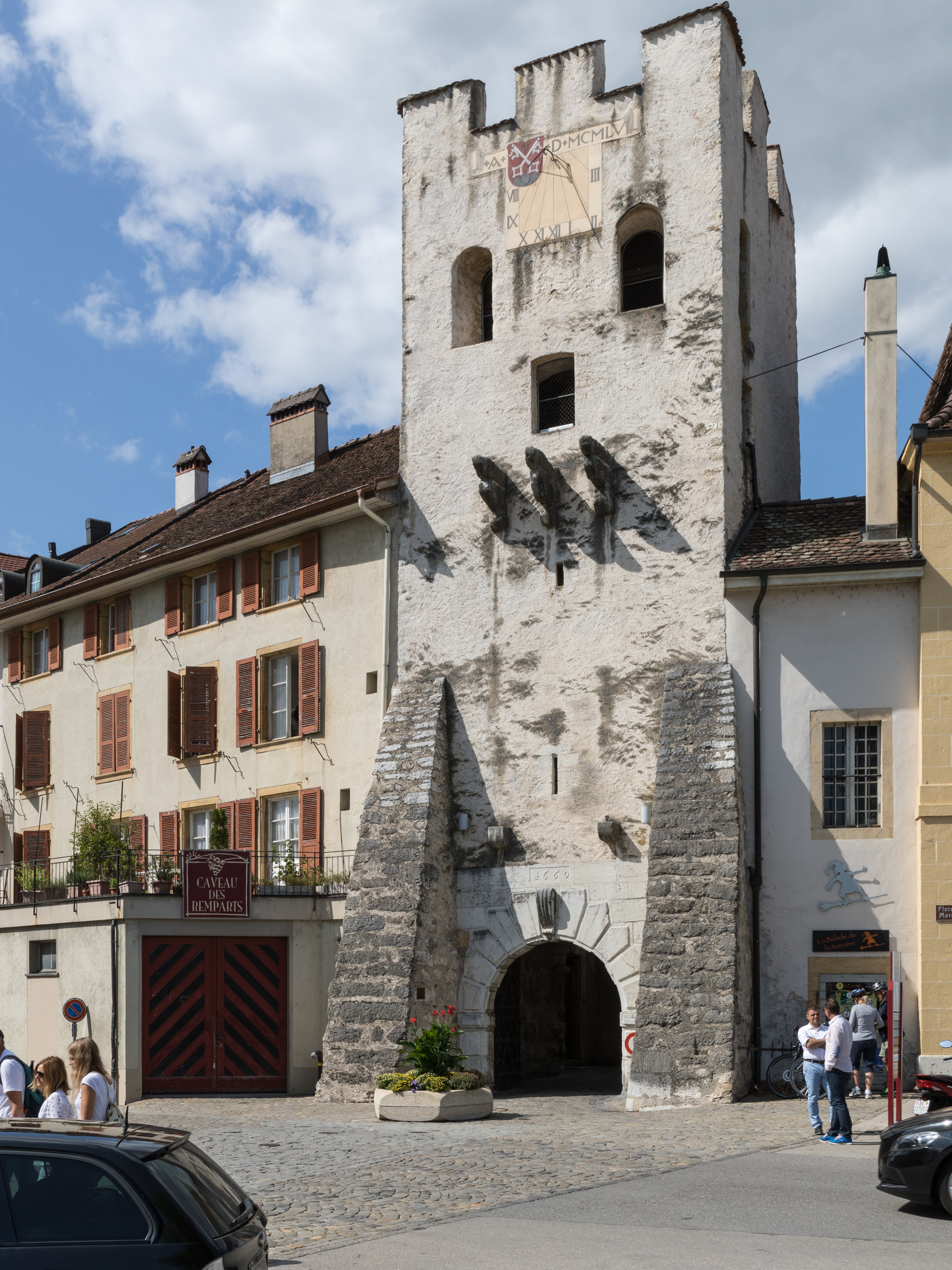
- Tour de Rive, Old City Gate

- Flag Coat of arms
- Location of La Neuveville
- Location within Switzerland Location within Canton of Bern
- Coordinates: 47°4′N 7°6′E
- Country: Switzerland
- Canton: Bern
- District: Jura bernois

Government
  - Executive: Conseil municipal with 7 members
  - Mayor: Maire; Luca Longo FDP/PLR (as of 2026)
  - Parliament: Conseil général with 35 members

Area
  - Total: 6.8 km^{2} (2.6 sq mi)
- Elevation: 434 m (1,424 ft)

Population (Dec 2011)
  - Total: 3,552
  - Density: 520/km^{2} (1,400/sq mi)
- Time zone: UTC+01:00 (CET)
  - Summer (DST): UTC+02:00 (CEST)
- Postal code: 2520
- SFOS number: 723
- ISO 3166 code: CH-BE
- Localities: Chavannes
- Surrounded by: Ligerz, Prêles, Lignières(NE), Le Landeron(NE)
- Website: www.neuveville.ch

La Neuveville (French: [la nœvvil]; German: Neuenstadt) is a municipality in the Jura bernois administrative district in the canton of Bern in Switzerland, located in the French-speaking Bernese Jura (Jura Bernois).

== History ==
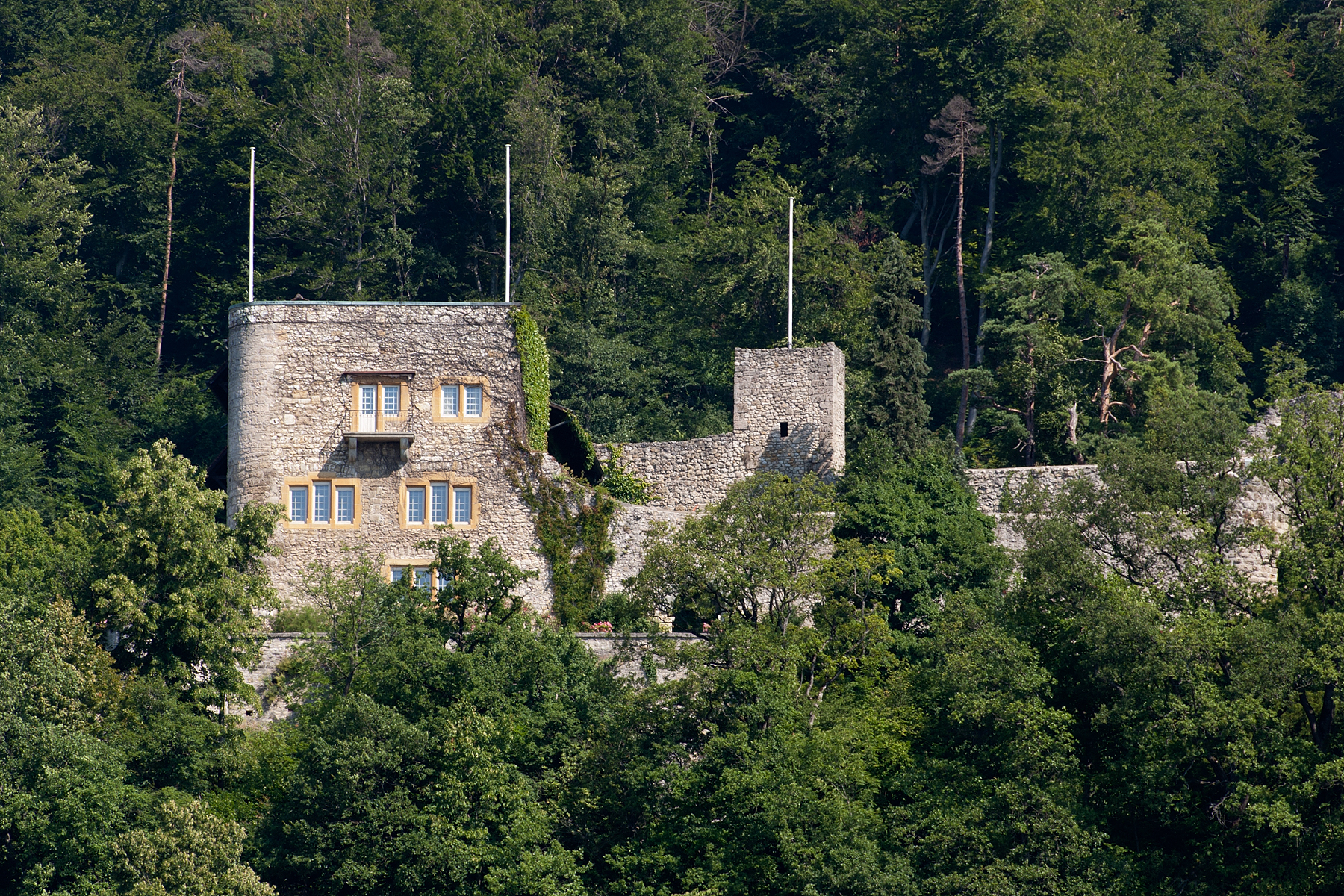
Schlossberg Castle above La Neuveville

Aerial view (1949)

La Neuveville is first mentioned in 1314 as Nova-villa.

The oldest traces of settlements in the area include Bronze Age ceramics, Iron Age building ruins and Roman era artifacts which were discovered under the White Church. A pair of graves near the church indicate that a church has stood on the spot since the early Carolingian era. The church is mentioned in 866 when King Lothair II gave it to Moutier-Grandval Abbey. The church was rebuilt or expanded at least twelve times since it was first built. The church's frescoes are from the 14th and 15th centuries.

In 999 the Abbot of Moutier-Grandval Abbey gave his extensive landholdings around Lake Biel, including where La Neuveville would be founded, to the Prince-Bishop of Basel. At that time the region was known as Nugerol and over the next centuries the Bishop of Basel and the Counts of Neuchâtel often quarreled over the land. In 1283-88 the Prince-Bishop Henry von Isny had the Schlossberg Castle built on the slopes of the Jura Mountains to help defend his claim to the land. To further solidify his claims, around 1310, the next Prince-Bishop, Gérard de Vuippens, founded the town of La Neuveville. The exact founding date is uncertain, but a citizen of the town is mentioned in 1310 while the town charter is from 1312. The town pushed the borders of the County of Neuchâtel to the eastern side of the Ruz de Vaux stream.

Under the Prince-Bishops, La Neuveville was the center of the Herrschaft of La Neuveville. The town had extensive autonomy. In 1367 fighting broke out between the Prince-Bishop Johann von Vienne and the city of Bern. The Prince-Bishop fled to Schlossberg Castle ahead of a Bernese army. Bern then besieged the town of La Neuveville and the castle. The citizens of La Neuveville rallied around the Prince-Bishop and drove the Bernese army away. In response, the Prince-Bishop granted the town additional rights and privileges in 1368. The town was granted the right to their own military banner and the right to call Tessenberg and Erguel to their banner. This granted the town a certain amount of military autonomy. Using their increased autonomy, in 1388 La Neuveville signed a citizenship agreement with Bern which granted citizens of La Neuveville the same rights as citizens of Bern. In 1395 they signed a similar pact with the city of Biel though they gave their banner-right over the Erguel region to Biel.

In 1529 and 1530 the French evangelist William Farel was active in spreading the new faith of the Protestant Reformation in La Neuveville. It remained a supporter of the new faith, despite being owned by the Catholic Prince-Bishops. In the 17th century it became an important stopping point for Huguenot refugees from France. The Catholic Notre-Dame-de-l'Assomption church was built in 1954 for the towns catholic population.

Despite the town's growing autonomy, its relationship with the Prince-Bishops remained good until the late 17th century. Between 1711 and 1713 and again between 1714 and 1717 riots against the Prince-Bishop occurred regularly in town. The unrest against the Prince-Bishop Johann Konrad von Reinach eventually required Bern's intervention to settle the uproar. After the 1798 French invasion, La Neuveville became part of the French Département of Mont-Terrible. Three years later, in 1800 it became part of the Département of Haut-Rhin. After Napoleon's defeat and the Congress of Vienna, La Neuveville was assigned to the Canton of Bern in 1815. Under Bernese authority the town was initially part of the district of Erlach before becoming the capital of the District de la Neuveville.

The town had a Latin school beginning in the 17th century. In the 18th century a boarding school for foreign students opened. In the 19th century the watch industry settled in La Neuveville. Today about 36% of jobs in the town are still in the watch industry. The other major industry is caring for the 84.8 hectares (210 acres) of vineyards that grow on the sunny Jura slopes above town.

== Geography ==
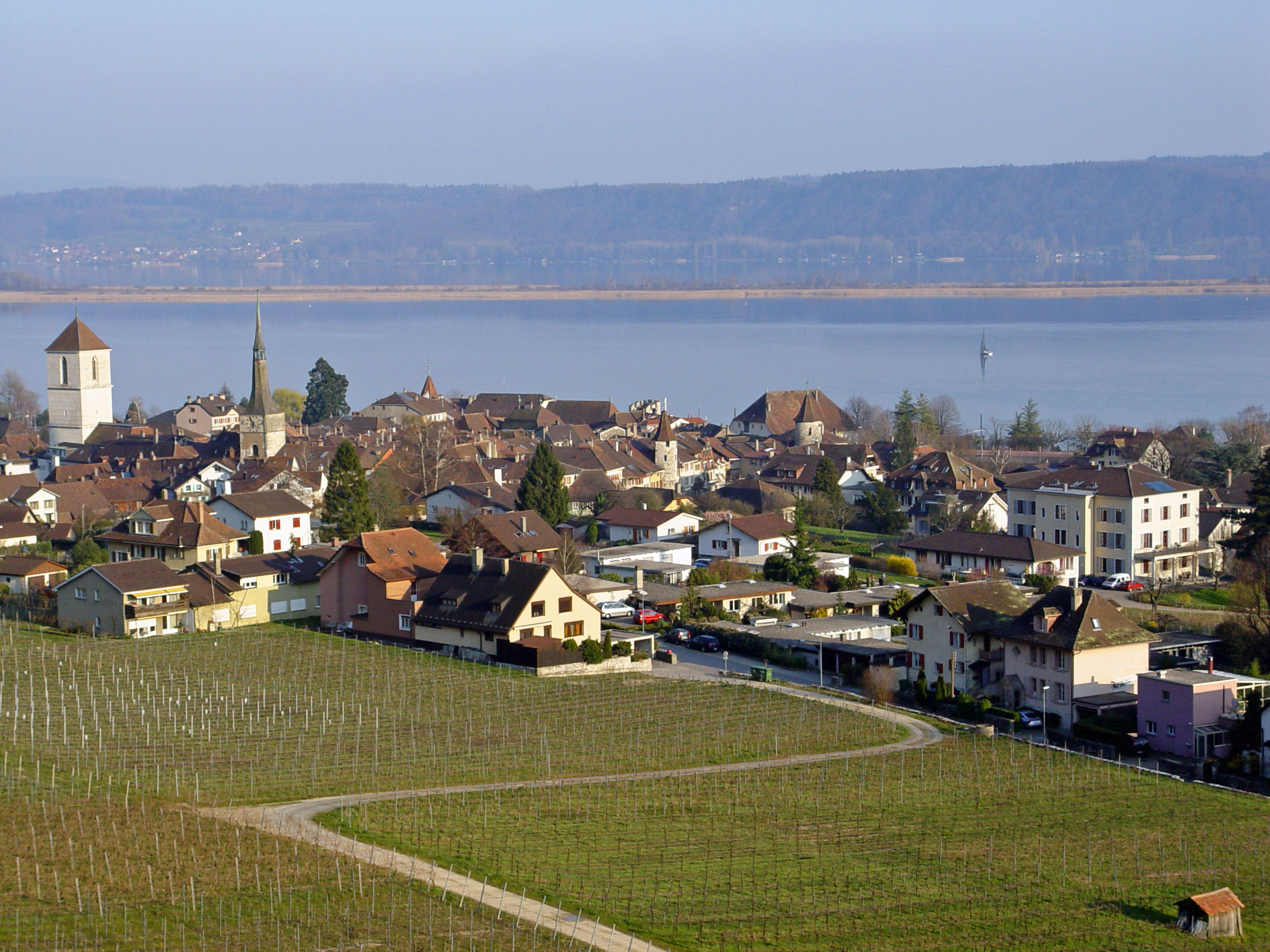
La Neuveville town, the surrounding vineyards and Lake Biel

La Neuveville has an area of 6.78 km^{2} (2.62 sq mi). As of 2012, a total of 1.26 km^{2} (0.49 mi^{2}) or 18.5% is used for agricultural purposes, while 4.27 km^{2} (1.65 mi^{2}) or 62.6% is forested. Of the rest of the land, 1.25 km^{2} (0.48 mi^{2}) or 18.3% is settled (buildings or roads), 0.01 km^{2} (2.5 acres) or 0.1% is either rivers or lakes and 0.02 km^{2} (4.9 acres) or 0.3% is unproductive land.

During the same year, housing and buildings made up 10.3% and transportation infrastructure made up 5.7%. Out of the forested land, all of the forested land area is covered with heavy forests. Of the agricultural land, 3.8% is pastures, while 13.8% is used for orchards or vine crops. All the water in the municipality is in lakes.

It is located on the bank of Lake Bienne. Although La Neuveville has only about 3400 inhabitants, the medieval town has the legal standing of a city according to the old city statutes (Stadtrecht). The municipality is located between the shores of Lake Bienne and the Chasseral peak of the Jura Mountains. Its western border is the Canton of Neuchâtel. It consists of the village of La Neuveville and the hamlet of Chavannes.

On 31 December 2009 the District de la Neuveville, of which it was the capital, was dissolved. On the following day, 1 January 2010, it joined the newly created Arrondissement administratif Jura bernois.

== Coat of arms ==
The blazon of the municipal coat of arms is Gules two Keys Argent in saltire on a Mount of 3 Coupeaux Sable.

== Demographics ==
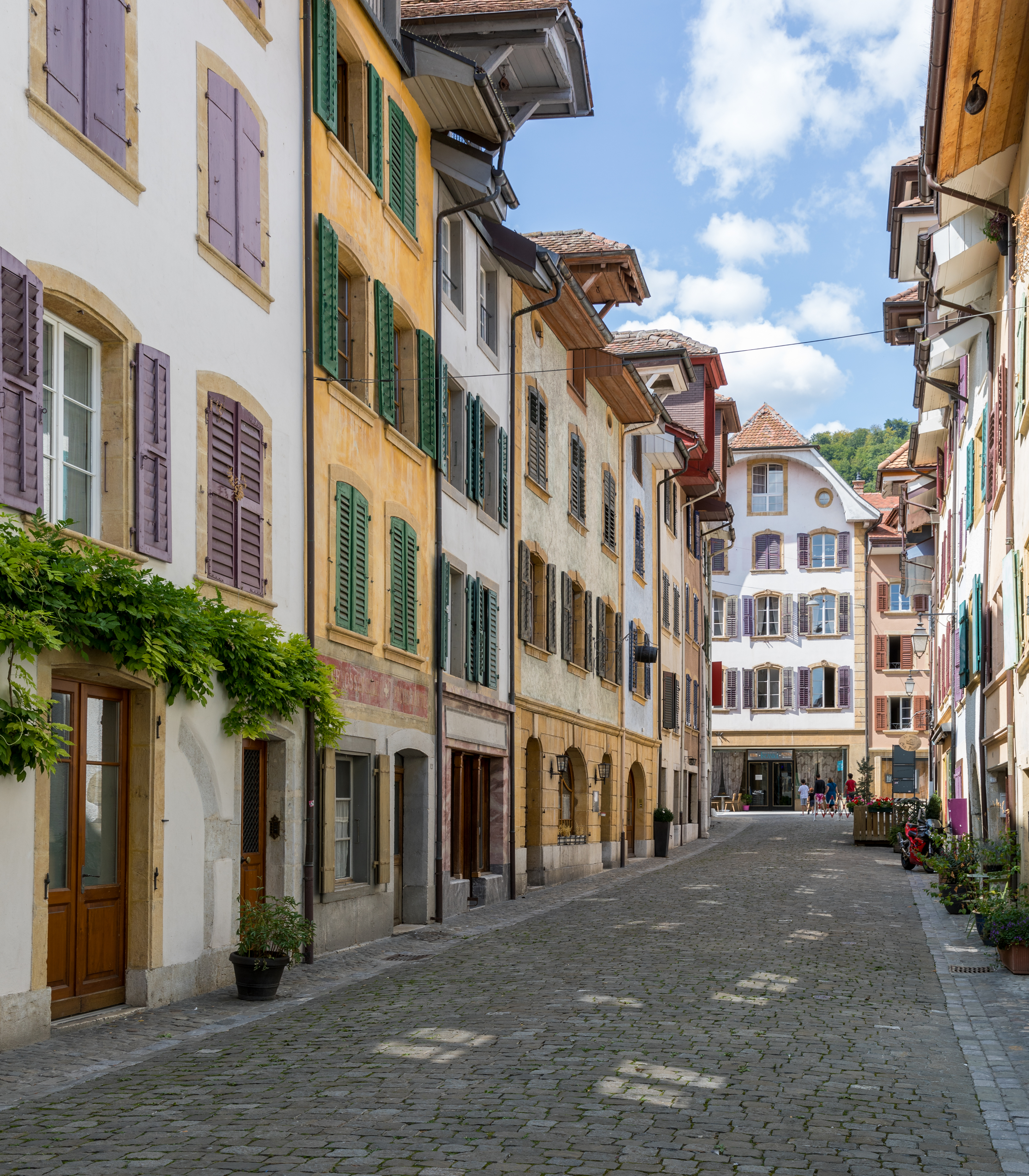
Rue Beauregard in the Old City

La Neuveville has a population (as of December 2020) of 3,780. As of 2010, 16.5% of the population are resident foreign nationals. Over the last 10 years (2001–2011) the population has changed at a rate of 1.6%. Migration accounted for 0.8%, while births and deaths accounted for 0.2%.

Most of the population (as of 2000) speaks French (2,644 or 76.7%) as their first language, German is the second most common (540 or 15.7%) and Italian is the third (100 or 2.9%). There are 3 people who speak Romansh.

As of 2008, the population was 47.7% male and 52.3% female. The population was made up of 1,348 Swiss men (38.6% of the population) and 320 (9.2%) non-Swiss men. There were 1,572 Swiss women (45.0%) and 255 (7.3%) non-Swiss women. Of the population in the municipality, 904 or about 26.2% were born in La Neuveville and lived there in 2000. There were 893 or 25.9% who were born in the same canton, while 910 or 26.4% were born somewhere else in Switzerland, and 607 or 17.6% were born outside of Switzerland.

As of 2011, children and teenagers (0–19 years old) make up 20.9% of the population, while adults (20–64 years old) make up 58.8% and seniors (over 64 years old) make up 20.3%.

As of 2000, there were 1,401 people who were single and never married in the municipality. There were 1,604 married individuals, 263 widows or widowers and 177 individuals who are divorced.

As of 2010, there were 552 households that consist of only one person and 84 households with five or more people. In 2000, a total of 1,411 apartments (85.7% of the total) were permanently occupied, while 174 apartments (10.6%) were seasonally occupied and 62 apartments (3.8%) were empty. As of 2010, the construction rate of new housing units was 0.6 new units per 1000 residents. The vacancy rate for the municipality, in 2012, was 1.46%.

The historical population is given in the following chart:

== Sights ==
Points of interest of the historical city are the Schlossberg, the city walls, the military defense towers, and the white church. Burgundian cannons captured by the Swiss after the Battle of Grandson in 1476 are today housed in a museum in La Neuveville. It is one of the largest collections of medieval artillery in the world.

=== Heritage sites of national significance ===
The Blanche Église Réformée (White Church), the Cour Gléresse (also called the Hof Ligerz), the Fontaines Des Bannerets, the city walls, the Hôtel de Ville (town hall), the Maison de Berne and the Maison des Dragons are listed as Swiss heritage site of national significance. The entire old town of La Neuveville and the hamlet of Chavannes are part of the Inventory of Swiss Heritage Sites.

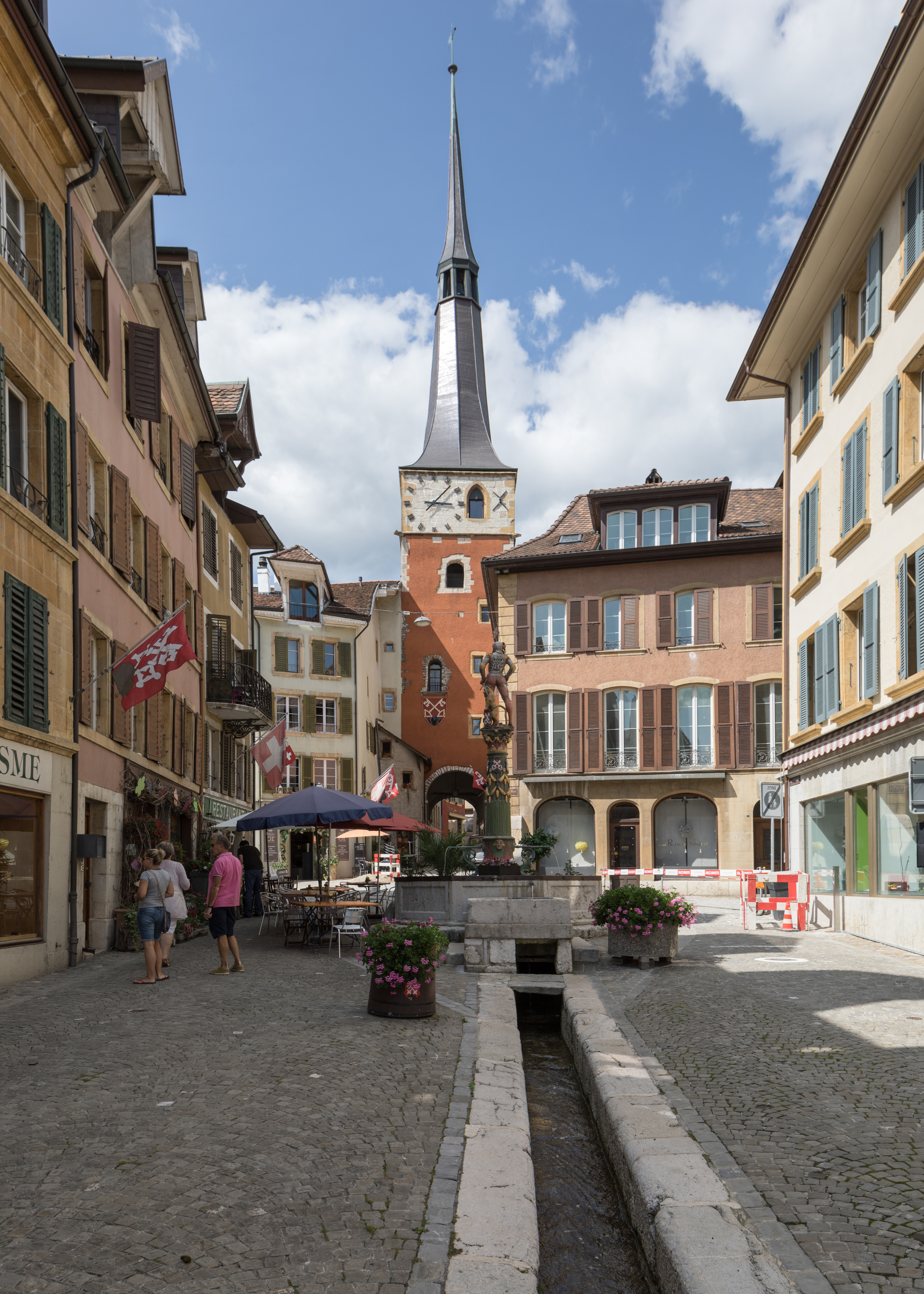
Market street with Red Tower

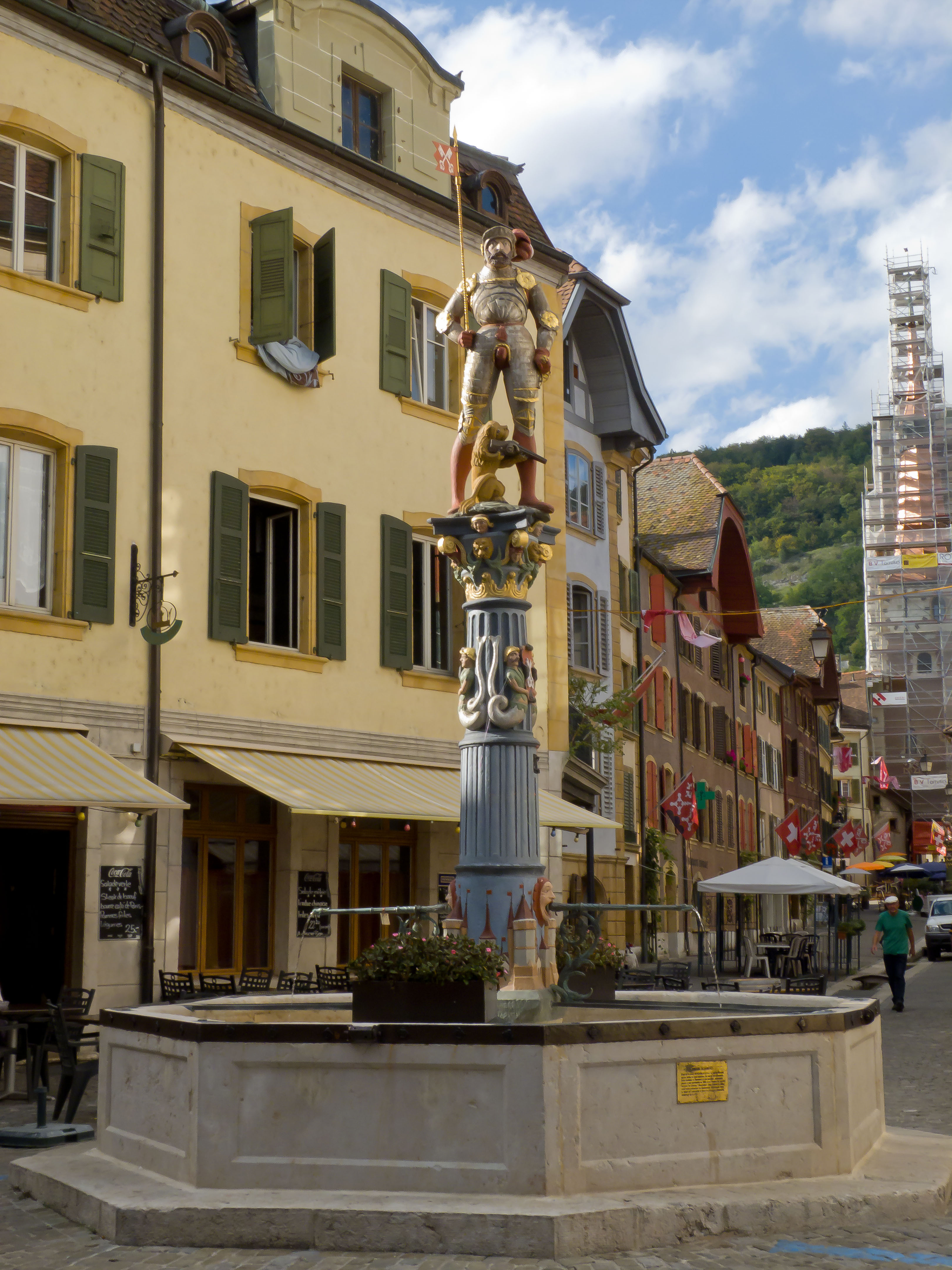
Fontaines Des Bannerets

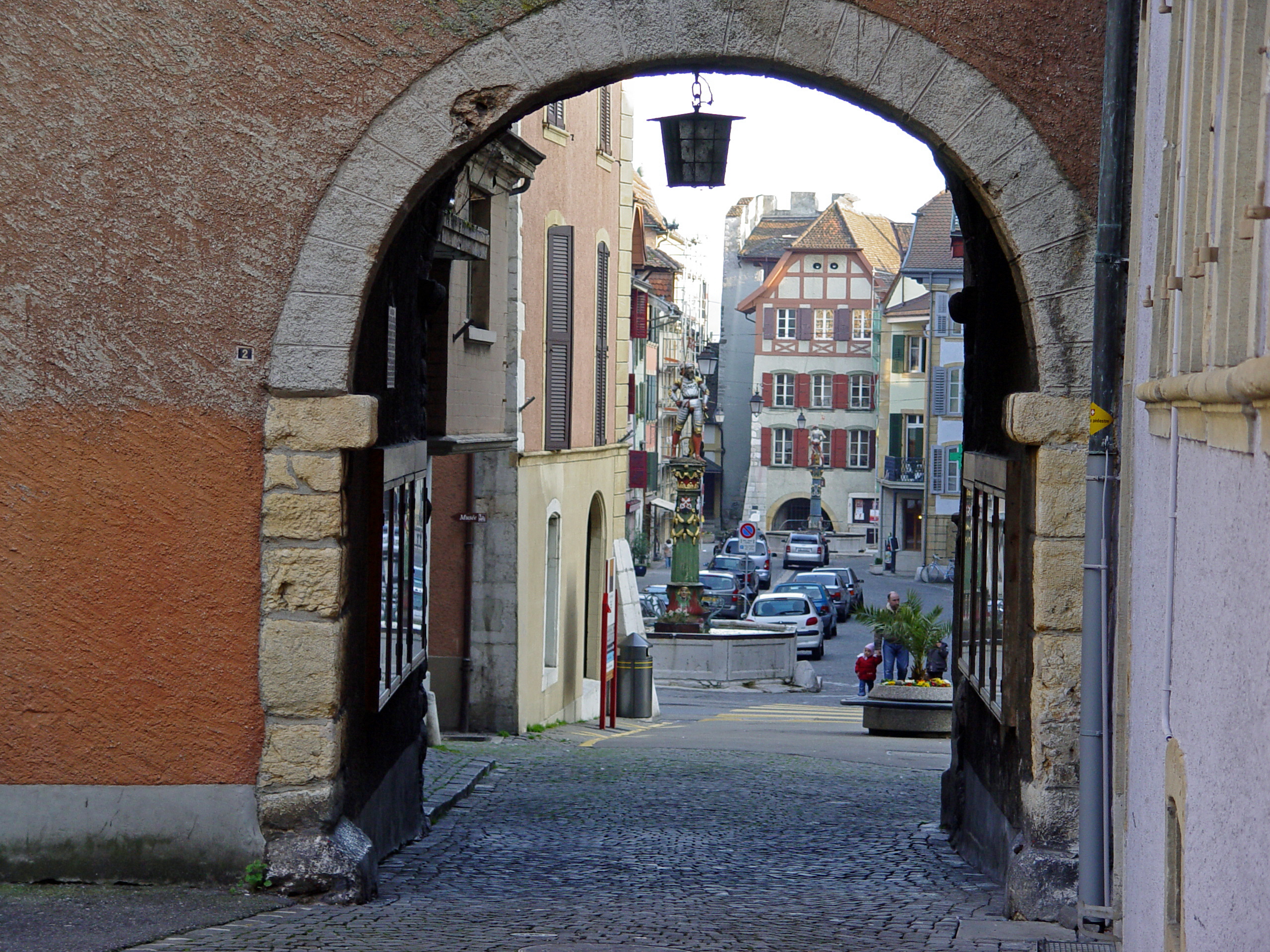
View through the gate of the city fortifications

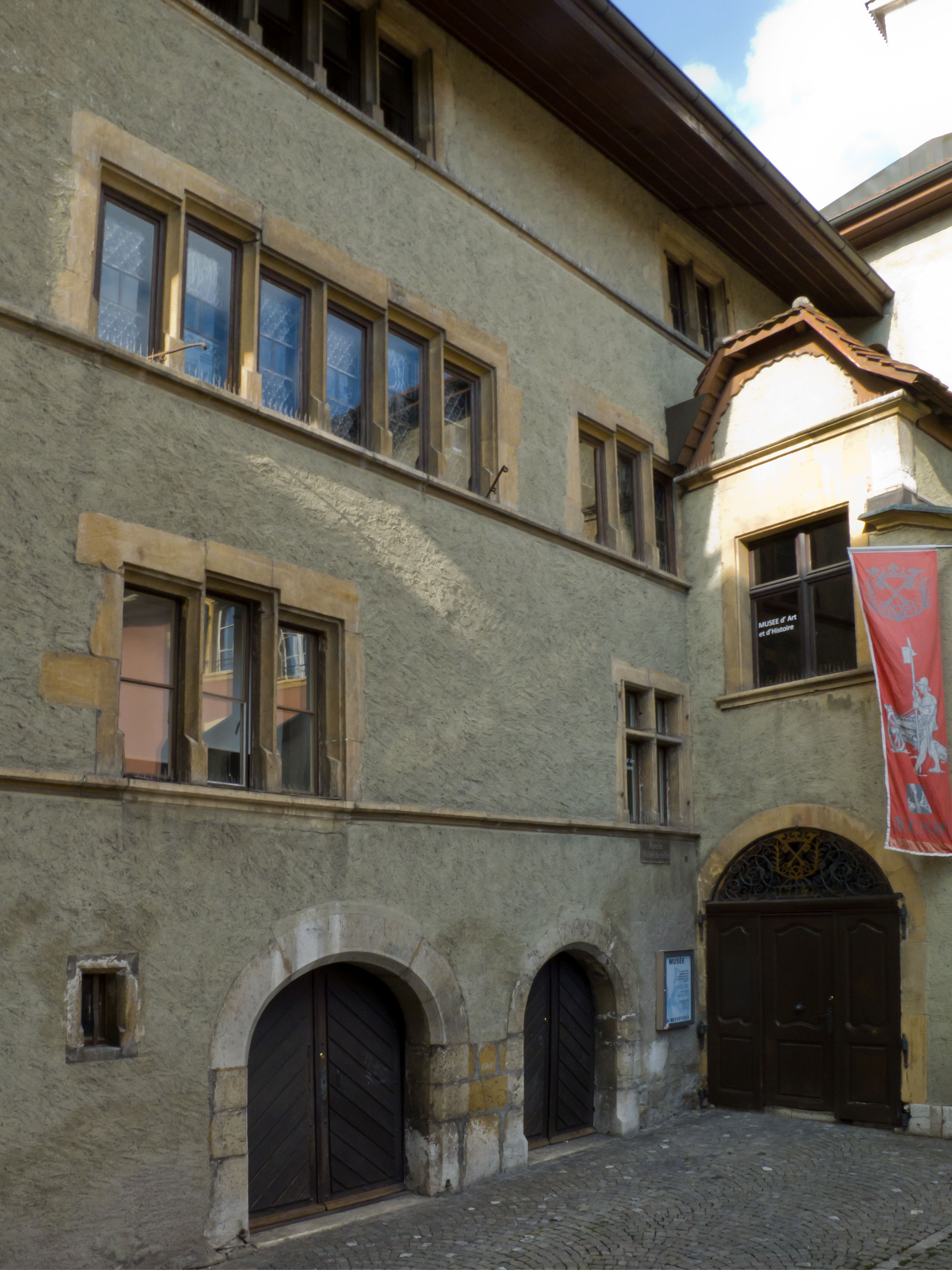
Hôtel de Ville (town hall)

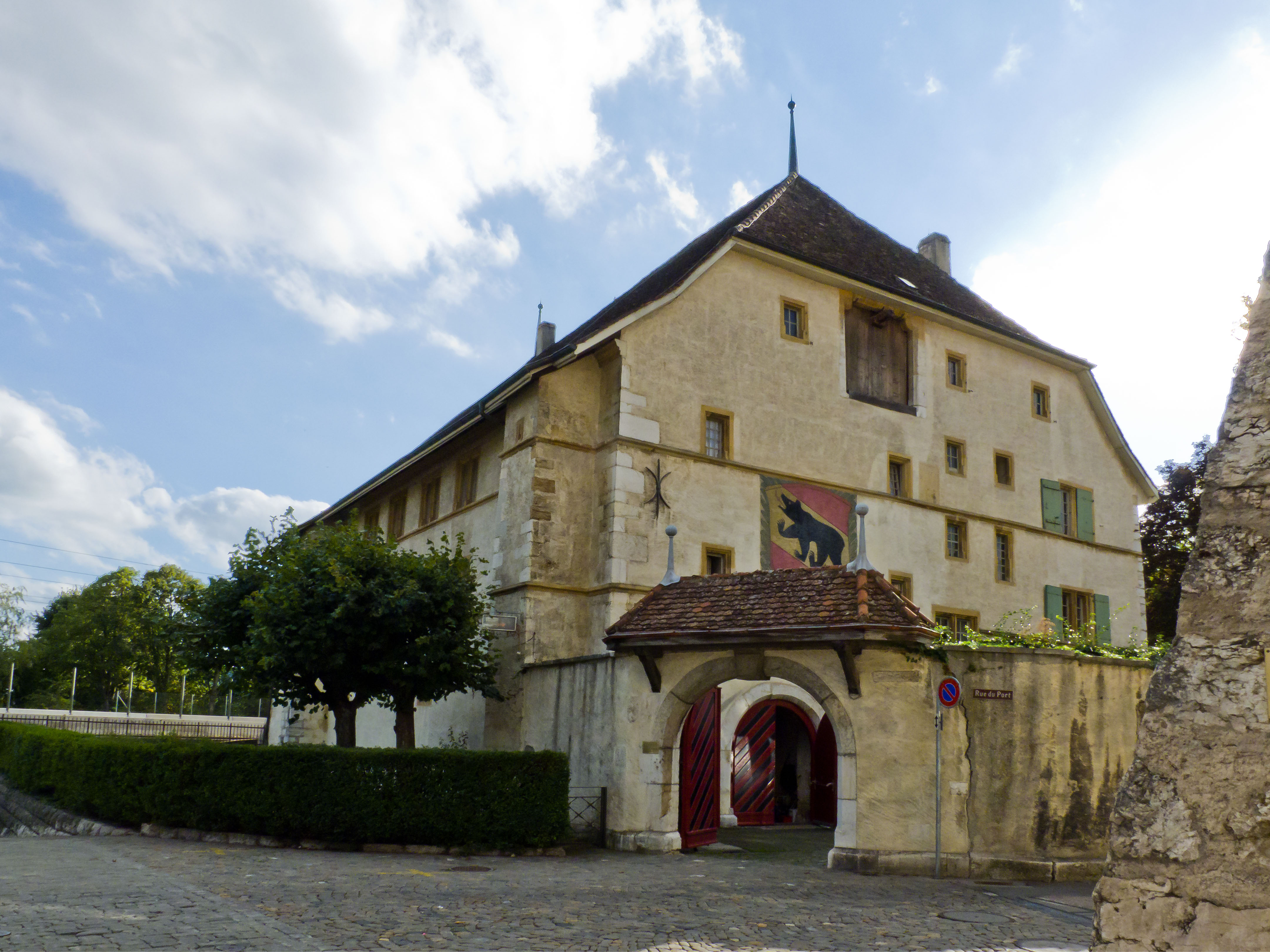
Maison de Berne

== Politics ==
In the 2011 federal election the most popular party was the Social Democratic Party (SP) which received 29.2% of the vote. The next three most popular parties were the FDP.The Liberals (19.2%), the Swiss People's Party (SVP) (17.4%) and the Green Party (13%). In the federal election, a total of 1,016 votes were cast, and the voter turnout was 42.1%.

== Economy ==
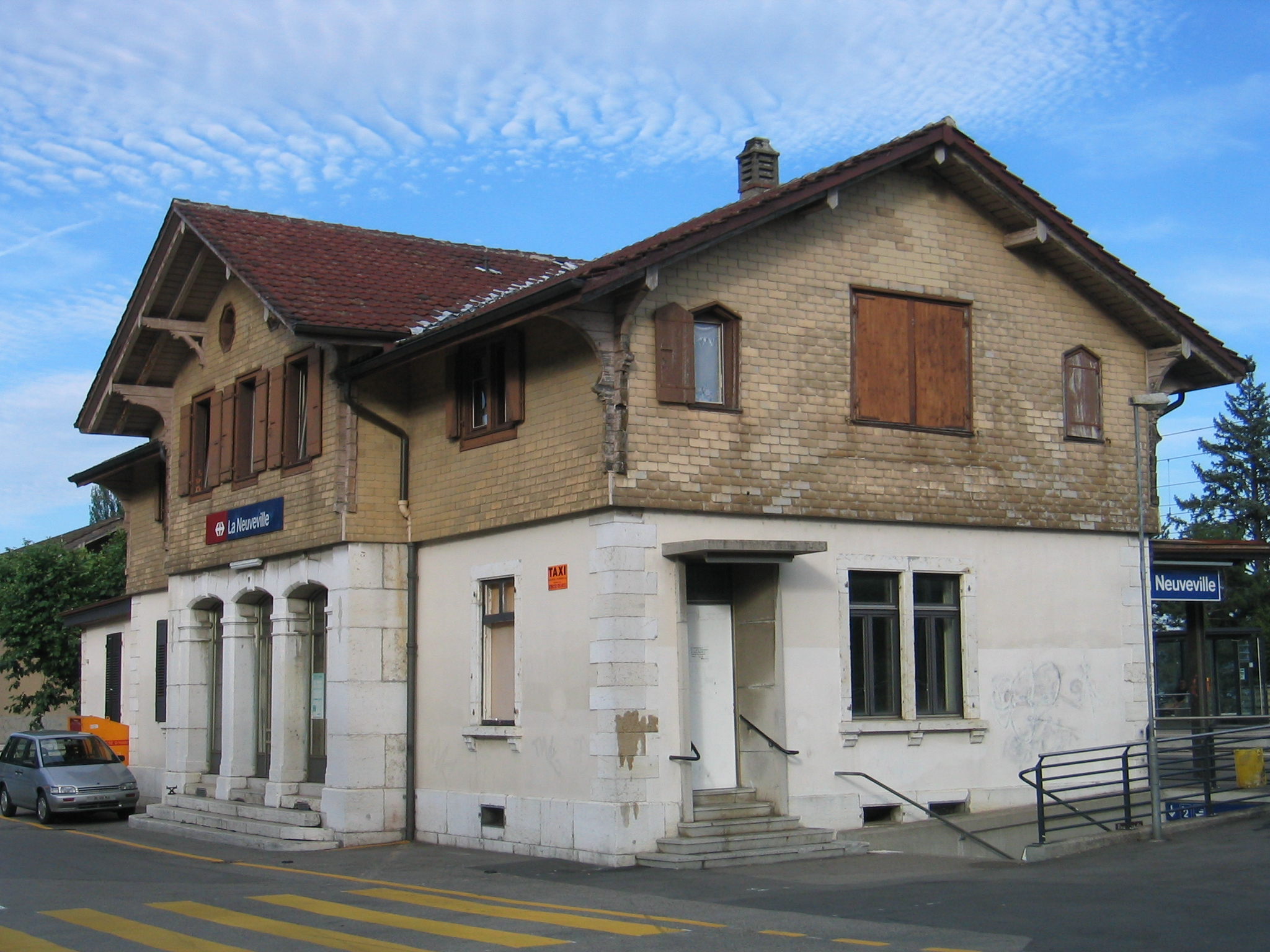
La Neuveville train station

As of 2011, La Neuveville had an unemployment rate of 1.7%. As of 2008, there were a total of 1,468 people employed in the municipality. Of these, there were 48 people employed in the primary economic sector and about 20 businesses involved in this sector. 578 people were employed in the secondary sector and there were 44 businesses in this sector. 842 people were employed in the tertiary sector, with 127 businesses in this sector. There were 1,650 residents of the municipality who were employed in some capacity, of which females made up 43.8% of the workforce.

In 2008 there were a total of 1,223 full-time equivalent jobs. The number of jobs in the primary sector was 34, all of which were in agriculture. The number of jobs in the secondary sector was 536 of which 451 or (84.1%) were in manufacturing and 69 (12.9%) were in construction. The number of jobs in the tertiary sector was 653. In the tertiary sector; 123 or 18.8% were in wholesale or retail sales or the repair of motor vehicles, 48 or 7.4% were in the movement and storage of goods, 66 or 10.1% were in a hotel or restaurant, 13 or 2.0% were in the information industry, 15 or 2.3% were the insurance or financial industry, 61 or 9.3% were technical professionals or scientists, 50 or 7.7% were in education and 223 or 34.2% were in health care.

In 2000, there were 809 workers who commuted into the municipality and 928 workers who commuted away. The municipality is a net exporter of workers, with about 1.1 workers leaving the municipality for every one entering. A total of 722 workers (47.2% of the 1,531 total workers in the municipality) both lived and worked in La Neuveville.

Of the working population, 13.5% used public transportation to get to work, and 56.2% used a private car.

In 2011 the average local and cantonal tax rate on a married resident of La Neuveville making 150,000 CHF was 12.4%, while an unmarried resident's rate was 18.2%. For comparison, the average rate for the entire canton in 2006 was 13.9% and the nationwide rate was 11.6%. In 2009 there were a total of 1,538 tax payers in the municipality. Of that total, 603 made over 75 thousand CHF per year. There were 9 people who made between 15 and 20 thousand per year. The average income of the over 75,000 CHF group in La Neuveville was 132,219 CHF, while the average across all of Switzerland was 130,478 CHF.

== Religion ==
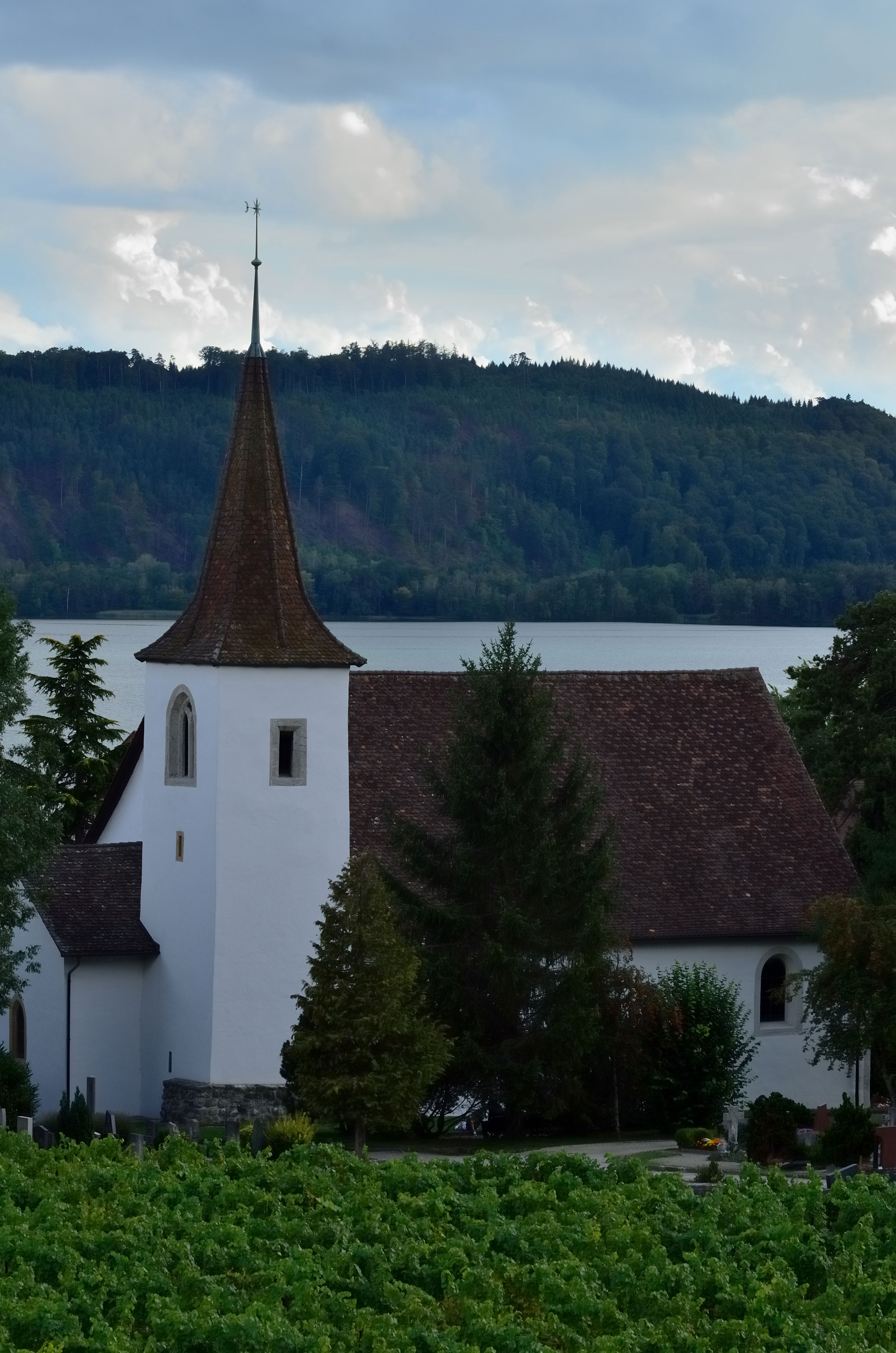
The White Church of La Neuveville

From the 2000 census, 1,596 or 46.3% belonged to the Swiss Reformed Church, while 947 or 27.5% were Roman Catholic. Of the rest of the population, there were 22 members of an Orthodox church (or about 0.64% of the population), there were 7 individuals (or about 0.20% of the population) who belonged to the Christian Catholic Church, and there were 305 individuals (or about 8.85% of the population) who belonged to another Christian church. There were 2 individuals (or about 0.06% of the population) who were Jewish, and 83 (or about 2.41% of the population) who were Islamic. There were 2 individuals who were Buddhist, 1 person who was Hindu and 5 individuals who belonged to another church. 487 (or about 14.14% of the population) belonged to no church, are agnostic or atheist, and 140 individuals (or about 4.06% of the population) did not answer the question.

== Education ==
In La Neuveville about 48.4% of the population have completed non-mandatory upper secondary education, and 23.5% have completed additional higher education (either university or a Fachhochschule). Of the 518 who had completed some form of tertiary schooling listed in the census, 59.8% were Swiss men, 29.2% were Swiss women, 7.5% were non-Swiss men and 3.5% were non-Swiss women.

The Canton of Bern school system provides one year of non-obligatory Kindergarten, followed by six years of Primary school. This is followed by three years of obligatory lower Secondary school where the students are separated according to ability and aptitude. Following the lower Secondary students may attend additional schooling or they may enter an apprenticeship.

During the 2011–12 school year, there were a total of 510 students attending classes in La Neuveville. There were 4 kindergarten classes with a total of 79 students in the municipality. Of the kindergarten students, 15.2% were permanent or temporary residents of Switzerland (not citizens) and 17.7% have a different mother language than the classroom language. The municipality had 11 primary classes and 190 students. Of the primary students, 18.9% were permanent or temporary residents of Switzerland (not citizens) and 22.1% have a different mother language than the classroom language. During the same year, there were 12 lower secondary classes with a total of 241 students. There were 14.5% who were permanent or temporary residents of Switzerland (not citizens) and 17.4% have a different mother language than the classroom language.

As of 2000, there were a total of 922 students attending any school in the municipality. Of those, 472 both lived and attended school in the municipality while 450 students came from another municipality. During the same year, 112 residents attended schools outside the municipality.

La Neuveville is home to the Bibliothèque régionale library. The library has (as of 2008) 20,099 books or other media, and loaned out 32,395 items in the same year. It was open a total of 216 days with average of 10 hours per week during that year.

== Notable people ==
- Jules Gilliéron (1854 in La Neuveville – 1926) was a Swiss dialectologist and pioneer of linguistic geography.
- Jean Preudhomme (1732 – 1795 in La Neuveville) was a Swiss painter mainly of landscapes and animals, buried in La Neuveville .
- Sophie Wyss (1897 in La Neuveville – 1983) was a Swiss soprano who made her career as a concert singer and broadcaster in the UK.
