= Richard Drakeford =

British composer

Richard Jeremy Drakeford (5 November 1936 – 12 November 2009) was a British composer of classical music.

Born in Southwark (London), Drakeford was a Westminster Abbey Choirboy and then became a Music Scholar at Clifton College and during that time became a composition pupil of Herbert Howells and Edmund Rubbra and studied at Worcester College, Oxford, where he was the Organ Scholar between 1955 and 1958. He was one of the founders, in 1961, of the Little Missenden [Music] Festival and acted as its Music Advisor until his death. Several of his compositions were published by Novello. He was also active as a music teacher and critic, writing for several publications including The Musical Times. He taught music at Harrow School between 1961 and 1985, serving as the school's Director of Music from 1976.

His output includes three string trios (1957, 1959, 1960, rev.1993); two string quartets (1959, 1961–90); several piano works ('A Handful of Pleasant Delights' 1955; Hors d'Oeuvre', 1955–61; Blue Notes, 1961); Trio for 3 oboes (1957) Suite No.2 for solo cello (1957–59), Oboe Quartet (1959); an opera 'The Sely Child' (1982) and several sets of songs ('Three Nonsense Songs' 1960; Four Auden Songs' 1967–69; 'Six Songs in Memory of Benjamin Britten', 1977; 'Robert Graves Songs', 1979).
