= Te Deum (Kodály) =

Composition by Zoltán Kodály

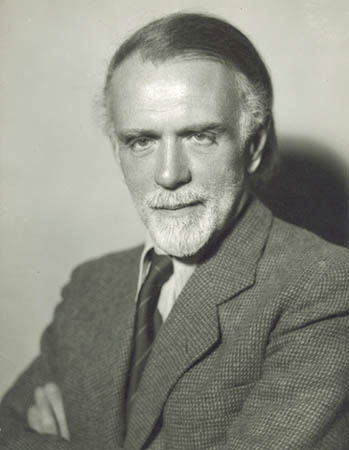
Kodály Zoltán in the 1930s

Zoltán Kodály wrote a choral setting of the Christian hymn Te Deum. First performed in 1936, this Budavári Te Deum is in a traditional Hungarian folk-music idiom but employs creative compositional methods unique to Kodály.

== Text ==
Te Deum is a hymn of thanks and joy used in the liturgy of the Roman Catholic church. It is sometimes referred to as the “Ambrosian Hymn” because the text was once believed to be by St. Ambrose, but it is now attributed to Nicetas, Bishop of Remesiana. Its liturgical use is year-round except for Advent and the penitential season of Lent.

== Recordings ==
Kodály's setting of Te Deum has been recorded numerous times. A couple of examples are listed.

- Zoltán Kodály and the Budapest Chorus, Polygram, 1990.
- Janos Ferencsik and the Budapest Symphony Orchestra, Hungaraton, 1994.

== Analysis ==
This work references a stylistic choice used in all of Kodály’s compositions, to reference the tools used in traditional Hungarian folk music. In this way, he was quite similar to Béla Bartók, who also used these traditional resources in his compositions. The works of these two composers use certain pentatonic groups, isometric strophe structure, and tempo giusto most commonly.

It can be seen from this example that most of the Te Deum follows the traditional compositional style of Kodály. Not only does one see stepwise motion in two of the voices (one of the common pentatonic groups he uses), but one also notices the leap of a fourth in the first measure in the bass line. This is a technique of Hungarian folk music that Kodály commonly uses, and continues to use consistently throughout Te Deum, particularly in the bass line.

As is common in Hungarian folk music, he employs verse structure, giving each section of the text its own individual musical style. There are no true or even tonal repeats at all throughout the work. Kodály begins the work in A minor, however he modulates multiple times throughout this lengthy work. He slowly modulates upward by step until the B section, during which he moves to E♭ major. The C section moves to E major. The D section slows down significantly, changing from 4/4 to 3/4 and introduces B♭ major. This is the solo section, and continues on in B♭ major, and it finally returns to E major. The remainder of the work contrasts between E major and E♭ major, ending in A major. The work contains a large amount of dynamic contrast, consistently alternating between forte and piano (or pianissimo). The overall mood of the dynamic starts forte and slowly wind down to a pianissimo finish.
