= 1936 in country music =

This is a list of notable events in country music that took place in the year 1936.

== Events ==
- In Knoxville, Tennessee the emerging media chain Scripps-Howard purchased the WNOX station in 1935, and then in 1936 the station launched its most popular program, the influential Mid-Day Merry-Go-Round, a live noontime performance show which highlighted hillbilly music artists.
- Lee Roy "Lasses" White of Wills Point, Texas, who was featured on the Nashville radio station WSM, with "Honey" Wilds, and they were featured in their own Friday night "minstrel show and on The Grand Ole Opry, left for Hollywood in May 1936. He found a career as a character actor in the B-Grade Western "horse operas".

== Top Hillbilly (Country) Recordings ==
The following songs were extracted from records included in Joel Whitburn's Pop Memories 1890-1954, record sales reported on the "Discography of American Historical Recordings" website, and other sources as specified. Numerical rankings are approximate, they are only used as a frame of reference.

Rank	Artist	Title	Label	Recorded	Released	Chart Positions
1	Gene Autry	"Mexicali Rose"	Melotone 60559	December 24, 1935	February 1936	US Hillbilly 1936 #1
2	Bob Wills and His Texas Playboys	"Spanish Two Step"	Vocalion 3230	September 23, 1935	June 1936	US Hillbilly 1936 #2
3	Monroe Brothers (Charles and Bill)	"What Would You Give In Exchange"	Bluebird 6309	February 17, 1936	April 25, 1936	US Hillbilly 1936 #3
4	Rambling Red Foley with The Cumberland Ridge Runners	"Old Shep"	Melotone 60353	December 9, 1935	March 1936	US Hillbilly 1936 #4
5	Gene Autry	"Nobody's Darling But Mine"	Melotone 60452	September 22, 1935	April 1936	US Hillbilly 1936 #5
6	Carter Family	"Jealous Hearted Me"	Melotone 13432	May 6, 1936	August 1936	US Hillbilly 1936 #6
7	Gene Autry	"You're the Only Star in My Blue Heaven"	Melotone 60559	December 5, 1935	April 1936	US Hillbilly 1936 #7
8	Bob Wills and His Texas Playboys	"Trouble in Mind"	Vocalion 3343	September 29, 1935	June 1936	US Hillbilly 1936 #8
9	Bing Crosby with Jimmy Dorsey Orchestra	"I'm an Old Cowhand (From the Rio Grande)"	Decca 871	July 17, 1936	August 1936	US BB 1936 #30, US #2 for 4 weeks, 13 total weeks, US Hillbilly 1936 #9
10	Sweet Violet Boys	"Sweet Violets"	Vocalion 3110	October 30, 1935	January 1936	US BB 1936 #172, US #12 for 1 weeks, 3 total weeks, US Hillbilly 1936 #10
11	Sons of the Pioneers	"Texas Star"	Decca 5232	May 4, 1936	June 1936	US Hillbilly 1936 #11
12	Bob Wills and His Texas Playboys	"Osage Stomp (Rukus Juice Shuffle)"	Vocalion 3096	September 23, 1935	December 1935	US Hillbilly 1936 #12
13	Sons of the Pioneers	"Ride Ranger Ride"	Decca 5243	June 18, 1936	July 1936	US Hillbilly 1936 #13
14	Blue Sky Boys	"Sunny Side of Life"	Bluebird 6457	June 16, 1936	July 31, 1936	US Hillbilly 1936 #14
15	Milton Brown and His Musical Brownies	"The Hesitation Blues"	Decca 5266	January 1, 1936	February 1936	US Hillbilly 1936 #15
16	Jimmie Davis	"Mama's Getting Hot and Papa's Getting Cold"	Decca 5249	June 1, 1936	August 1936	US Hillbilly 1936 #16
17	Sweet Violet Boys	"Sweet Violets No. 2"	Vocalion 3256	March 23, 1936	July 1936	US BB 1936 #236, US #16 for 1 weeks, 2 total weeks, US Hillbilly 1936 #17
18	Bill Boyd And His Cowboy Ramblers	"When The Sun Sets On My Swiss Chalet"	Bluebird 6599	February 24, 1936	October 1936	US Hillbilly 1936 #18
19	Bob Wills and His Texas Playboys	"Sitting on Top of the World"	Vocalion 3139	September 24, 1935	January 1936	US Hillbilly 1936 #19
20	Jimmie Rodgers & Carter Family	"Why There’s a Tear in My Eye"	Bluebird 6698	June 10, 1931	November 23, 1936	US Hillbilly 1936 #20

== Births ==
- January 2 – Roger Miller, singer-songwriter best known for honky-tonk novelty songs, and the non-novelty "King of the Road" (died 1992).
- February 27 – Chuck Glaser, 83, member of Tompall and the Glaser Brothers (died 2019).
- March 9 – Mickey Gilley, pianist and nightclub owner who enjoyed success throughout the 1970s and 1980s; cousin of Jerry Lee Lewis and Jimmy Swaggart (died 2022).
- April 22 – Glen Campbell, pop-country singer and guitarist, host of The Glen Campbell Goodtime Hour (died 2017).
- May 25 – Tom T. Hall, singer-songwriter who became known as "The Storyteller" (died 2021).
- June 22 – Kris Kristofferson, singer-songwriter and actor who grew to fame in the late 1960s and early 1970s (died 2024).
- July 24 – Max D. Barnes, songwriter and record producer whose peak came in the 1980s and early 1990s (died 2004).
- November 5 – Billy Sherrill, record producer for numerous acts in the 1960s through 1980s, most famously Tammy Wynette (died 2015).
- December 12 – Reggie Young, session guitarist (died 2019).
