= Our Hunting Fathers =

1936 song cycle by Benjamin Britten

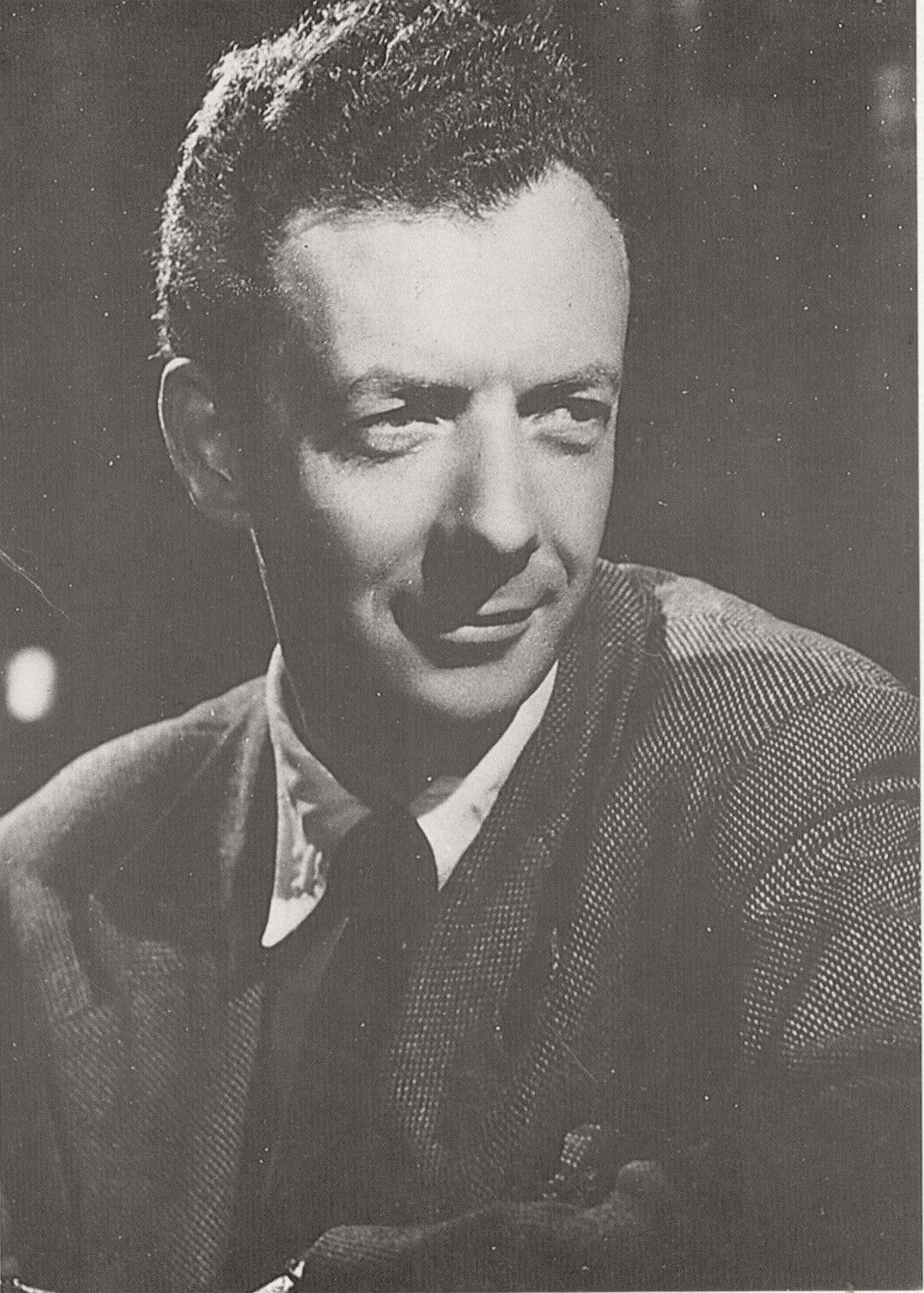
Benjamin Britten in the 1940s

Our Hunting Fathers, Op. 8, is an orchestral song cycle by Benjamin Britten, first performed in 1936. Its text, assembled and partly written by W. H. Auden, with a pacifist slant, puzzled audiences at the premiere, and the work has never achieved the popularity of the composer's later orchestral song-cycles, Les Illuminations, the Serenade for Tenor, Horn and Strings and the Nocturne.

== Background ==
In the mid-1930s Britten was employed by the GPO Film Unit, composing music for documentary films. Also working for the unit was the poet and critic W. H. Auden, with whom Britten collaborated on the films Coal Face (1935) and Night Mail (1936). Auden was something of a mentor to the young Britten, encouraging him to widen his aesthetic, intellectual and political horizons.

Britten received a commission to compose a work involving orchestra for the 1936 Norfolk and Norwich Triennial Music Festival. Auden assembled the text for an orchestral song cycle, writing some of it and adapting other sections from existing poems. The work, described as a "symphonic cycle for high voice and orchestra", was composed between May and July 1936 and titled Our Hunting Fathers.

On 19 September 1936, less than a week before the premiere, Britten rehearsed the work with the soprano Sophie Wyss and the London Philharmonic Orchestra in the loft at Covent Garden. Britten afterwards described the rehearsal as "the most catastrophic evening of my life" which left him "feeling pretty suicidal". According to Sophie Wyss, the "members of the orchestra were not used to that kind of music and played about disgracefully. When the reference to rats came in the score they ran around pretending they were chasing rats on the floor!" Ralph Vaughan Williams, who was present, reproved the orchestra, with the result, Wyss recalls, that the players "pulled themselves together" in time for the next rehearsal held in Norwich on 21 September.

== Premiere and reception ==
The premiere was given at the 34th Norfolk and Norwich Triennial Musical Festival on 25 September 1936, conducted by the composer. The performance went without mishap, leaving "most of the audience", according to Britten, "very interested if bewildered". The press reviews ranged "from flattering & slightly bewildered (D. Tel.) – to reprehension & disapproving (Times)".

Richard Capell in The Daily Telegraph wrote:

It is Puck-like music, fantastically nimble and coruscating, having, like Puck, the advantage, if sheer will-of-the-wispness of movement and effect is the kind of activity wanted, of being without flesh or bones. The general impression is a kind of orchestral prank in which the instruments lead a distracted human voice into one embarrassing position after another. The voice in question belonged to clever Sophie Wyss, a Swiss singer, who before she performs the piece again should be coached in some of the niceties of English, for instance, the difference between the pronunciation of 'Ay' and 'Aye'.

The reviewer in The Observer, comparing the piece unfavourably with Vaughan Williams's Five Tudor Portraits which had been premiered at the festival that same day, wrote:

After Vaughan Williams, struggling in the thicket of his poetic fancies, even in so bluff a work, to come upon Benjamin Britten, lightly unburdening himself of dire nonsense, was a curious experience. Since, however, those parts which W. H. Auden has directly contributed to the text of Our Hunting Fathers remain obscure after a tenth reading, judgment of Mr Britten's composition as a whole would be unfair. But it did seem, all things considered, that what he had done was hardly worth doing, and that, having done it, he would have served his reputation better had he remained like the hunting fathers at the end of Auden's text (or is it the present generation?—or the lion?) anonymous.

The Times was less severe, but its critic made his dislike of the piece discreetly clear.

It was kindly received, either because the composer is the youngest of the products of East Anglia represented here, or because he so evidently knows exactly what sort of sound he wants to make at every moment, or because his singer, Miss Sophie Wyss, showed herself almost as clever as he is, or because his audience shares with him some sense of music or of humour, or both, to which we are strangers. … Though only now 23 he is no newcomer. His earlier works have made their mark, and perhaps this one will; or, if it is just a stage to be got through, we wish him safely and quickly through it.

Although Britten's music had, as a biographer put it, "bizarre new sounds" calculated to discomfit an audience, most of the opprobrium seems to have been directed at Auden's text. Ostensibly about man's relationship with animals it is a not very deeply disguised tract about man's relationship with man, from a left-wing, pacifist viewpoint.

In April 1937 the BBC broadcast a performance of the work with Wyss and the BBC Symphony Orchestra conducted by Sir Adrian Boult; the cycle was not performed again until 1950. The analyst Lloyd Moore commented in 2004 that even latterly the work is seldom heard in the concert-hall and "must qualify as one of the most neglected of Britten's major works".

== Structure ==
The work lasts about half an hour in performance. It is in five sections:

1. Prologue – words by Auden
2. Rats Away! – anonymous, updated by Auden
3. Messalina – anonymous
4. Hawking for the Partridge (Dance of Death) – words by Thomas Ravenscroft
5. Epilogue – words by Auden.

The Prologue is in a form akin to recitative and introduces the cycle's musical motto, described by Moore as "a descending major triad climbing back to the minor third". "Rats Away!" is an agitated, shrill section, demanding vocal virtuosity from the soloist, who is gradually overwhelmed by the orchestra, its music suggesting the scurrying of rats.

The third section, "Messalina", is a lyrical elegy for a dead monkey, with a succession of solos for flute, oboe, clarinet and saxophone. The fourth section, "Hawking for the Partridge" (subtitled Dance of Death) follows without a break, the soloist reciting the names of the dogs joining in the hunt. In Moore's words, "The catch itself is marked by a fortissimo unison on the muted brass, after which the soprano isolates the two names 'German, Jew', signifying unambiguously who is the hunter and who the hunted."

The work ends with an epilogue and funeral march, disrupted by a repetitive motif on the xylophone, bringing the cycle to an equivocal and ambiguous conclusion.

== Instrumentation ==
The orchestra consists of: two flutes (2nd doubling piccolo), two oboes (2nd doubling cor anglais), clarinet in B♭/A, E♭ clarinet (doubling bass clarinet), alto saxophone, two bassoons, four horns, two trumpets, three trombones, bass tuba, timpani, percussion (bass drum, side drum, tenor drum, cymbals, triangle, tambourine, xylophone), harp, and strings.

== Recordings ==
The cycle has been recorded with soprano soloists, and also with tenors, as authorised by the score.

- Ian Bostridge, Britten Sinfonia, Daniel Harding (EMI Classics) OCLC 43271701
- Phyllis Bryn-Julson, English Chamber Orchestra, Steuart Bedford (Naxos),
- Heather Harper, London Philharmonic Orchestra, Bernard Haitink (LPO)
- Peter Pears, London Symphony Orchestra, Benjamin Britten (BBC) OCLC 44873944
- Elisabeth Söderström, Orchestra of Welsh National Opera, Richard Armstrong (EMI Classics) OCLC 32488462

== Notes ==
=== References ===
- Britten, Benjamin (1991). Donald Mitchell (ed.). Letters from a Life: The Selected Letters of Benjamin Britten, Volume 1, 1923–39. London: Faber & Faber. ISBN 057115221X.
- Matthews, David (2013). Britten. London: Haus Publishing. ISBN 978-1908323385.
