= Hermann Bischoff =

German composer

- Born: 7 January 1868
- Died: 25 January 1936 (aged 68)
- Occupation: Composer

Hermann Bischoff (7 January 1868 in Duisburg – 25 January 1936 in Berlin) was a German composer of classical music.

After leaving Leipzig to continue his first studies of music, he met Richard Strauss and fell in with his circle.

Bischoff's two symphonies have been recorded on the record label Classic Produktion Osnabrück, along with a 1926 Introduction und Rondo. His first symphony, dedicated to Strauss was performed (premiered?) in Essen on 24 May 1906, as part of the 42nd Tonkünstler-Festival, the same festival that saw the premiere of Gustav Mahler's Sixth Symphony.

== Compositions ==
- Two symphonies
  - No. 1 in E major (published in 1906)
  - No. 2 in D minor (1910, premiered 1911, published 1914 by F.E.C. Leuckart)
- Other works with Orchestra
  - Introduction and Rondo for Orchestra (1926)
- Various Songs with Piano (e.g. Op. 3, Op. 6, Op. 7, Op.15) and with Orchestral Accompaniment
