= Orquestra Pau Casals =

Orchestra based in Barcelona, Spain

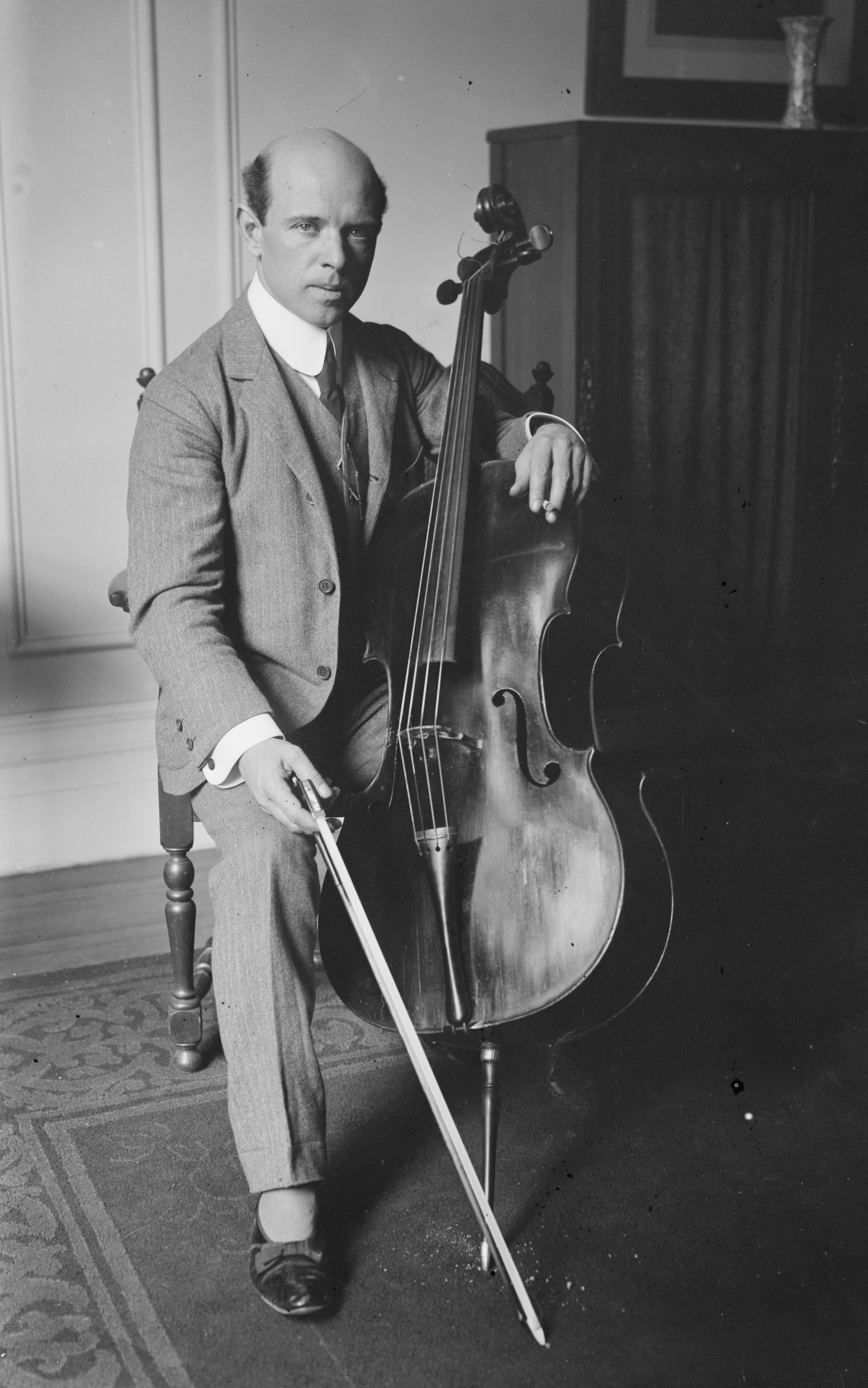
Pau Casals at an unknown date, c. 1910s-1920s

The Orquestra Pau Casals (Spanish: Orquesta Pau Casals) was established by Pablo Casals (in Catalan Pau Casals) in the early 1920s in Barcelona, with the debut performance taking place October 13, 1920. There had been other orchestras in Barcelona, but none that played with any enduring success. The orchestra was managed by a group of Casals' friends including Felip Capdevila and Casals' second wife Francesca.

== History ==
Casals hired musicians full-time and invested his savings to balance the accounts. He spent a great deal of effort in working with the orchestra and raising the level of technical accomplishment, so much so that he suffered a "nervous breakdown" at one point and had to rest for several months. However, after nine years of training, the Orquestra Pau Casals became recognized as one of the finer orchestras in Europe, attracting high quality soloists and guest conductors. Casals conducted the orchestra himself, and promoted it by playing with it exclusively as a soloist in Barcelona and refusing to play at other venues in the area.

Casals organized his orchestral performances to appeal to the working-class people of Catalonia, and workmen and their families often attended, listening to Mozart, Beethoven and other classical repertoire. Dedicated to the ideal that everyone should appreciate and support music, Casals also founded the Associacio Obrera de Concerts (Working Men's Concert Association) in Barcelona with annual dues of six pesetas which served as a subscription to his concert series.

The orchestra recorded Beethoven's First and Fourth Symphonies in November 1929. Other recordings are also available.
