= Sophie Wyss =

- Wyss c. 1920s

Background information
- Born: 5 July 1897; La Neuveville, Bern, Switzerland
- Died: 25 December 1983 (aged 86); Bognor Regis, UK
- Occupation: Musician
- Instrument: Singer
- Labels: Decca
- Spouse: Arnold Gyde (m. 1925; died 1959)

Sophie Adele Wyss (5 July 1897 – 25 December 1983) was a Swiss soprano who made her career as a concert singer and broadcaster in the UK. She was noted for her performances of French works, many of them new to Britain, for giving the world premieres of Benjamin Britten's orchestral song cycles Our Hunting Fathers (1936) and Les Illuminations (1940), and for encouraging other composers to set English and French texts. Among those who wrote for her were Lennox Berkeley, Arnold Cooke, Roberto Gerhard, Elizabeth Maconchy, Peter Racine Fricker, Alan Rawsthorne and Mátyás Seiber.

== Life and career ==
Wyss was born to a musical family in La Neuveville, Canton of Bern, Switzerland. Her two sisters, Emilie Perret-Wyss and Colette Feschotte-Wyss, were also singers, and the three sometimes performed together. She studied at the Geneva Conservatoire and the Basle Music Academy. In 1925 she married a British army officer, Captain Arnold Gyde, who had retired from the armed forces and become a publisher in London. He also became the treasurer of the Committee for the Promotion of New Music, founded in 1943.

Making her home in England, Wyss embarked on a career as a soloist. At first she failed to impress the critics. After an early recital in London in 1927, The Times said, "Miss Wyss has some pleasant notes in her voice, but the tone was tight in the upper range. A pronounced wobble, which appeared now and then, and a tendency to go out of tune showed that she has not yet gained sufficient control over her voice." By the 1930s her notices had improved from reserved to enthusiastic. The Times said that Wyss "possesses a soprano voice of an exquisitely yielding quality ... a singer so completely satisfying that we would not trust ourselves to say how much of the pleasure we derived from her performances was due to her or the music itself."

In 1936, together with Adolph Hallis, Benjamin Britten, Alan Rawsthorne and Christian Darnton, Wyss was a founder of the Hallis Concert Society, which gave a number of innovative concerts in London in the period 1936–1939. These included British premieres of both contemporary and historical British and European music, including works of Giovanni Pierluigi da Palestrina, François Couperin, Alban Berg, Paul Hindemith, Elisabeth Lutyens and Elizabeth Maconchy.

Wyss encouraged British composers to set French texts for her to perform. The most famous work that resulted from this was Britten's Les Illuminations to words by Rimbaud, which Wyss premiered in London in 1940 with Boyd Neel and his orchestra. (Note: In April 1939 Wyss had premiered the only two songs then composed for the cycle, "Marine" and "Being Beauteous". She repeated them with the BBC Symphony Orchestra conducted by Sir Henry Wood at a promenade concert in August of that year. In later years Britten insisted that the cycle should be sung by a tenor, though this was almost certainly due to the influence of Pears.) Wyss was equally at home with English texts, such as those in Britten's Our Hunting Fathers (1936) and On This Island (1937). Britten dedicated Vol. 2 of his Folk Song Arrangements (1942) to Wyss and Gyde's two sons, Arnold and Humphrey. Britten was also Humphrey's godfather. (Note: The boy's godmother was the UK-based Australian novelist Henry Handel Richardson.) She gave the first performance of his 8 French Folksongs, in a 1942 National Gallery recital with Gerald Moore, and she and Britten later recorded five of these songs. However, by 1942, Britten's knowledge of voice and vocal technique had greatly increased, and he preferred Peter Pears's interpretation of Les Illuminations to Wyss's performance, which he described to a close friend as "hopelessly inefficient, subjective & (of all things) so coy & whimsey!!!" Though Wyss was keen to resume her professional relationship with Britten, he was no longer interested but confessed to Pears that he was "too fond of her to be rude, & not interested enough to be critical". (Note: Towards the end of her life, Wyss claimed that the final rift between herself and Britten was due to her husband, Arnold Gyde, taking offence that Britten preferred Pears singing Les illuminations. Although Wyss would have preferred to remain friends, her husband "could not forgive the slight" he believed Britten had committed.)

As a near neighbour of Gerald Finzi's, from 1941 Wyss performed in several of his concerts involving the Newbury String Players, singing the Aria from Finzi's Dies Natalis as well as works by William Byrd, Henry Purcell, George Frideric Handel, Ivor Gurney, and Ralph Vaughan Williams. Wyss gave many first performances of works in French or English by composers including Lennox Berkeley, Arnold Cooke, Roberto Gerhard, Elizabeth Maconchy, Peter Racine Fricker, Alan Rawsthorne, George Enescu, Antony Hopkins and Mátyás Seiber. She was also a leading exponent in the UK of songs by Gabriel Fauré, Claude Debussy, Reynaldo Hahn, Maurice Ravel and other French composers. During a career that lasted until the early 1960s Wyss broadcast extensively for the BBC, and made concert tours in continental Europe and Australia. She died in Bognor Regis on the south coast of England at the age of 86. In an obituary notice, The Times concluded, "Her contribution to British musical life was something special and will be hard to replace".

== Recordings ==
Wyss recorded for Decca Records from 1941 to 1946. The works she sang included some by English composers: Bliss's "The Hare" and "The Buckle" from his Three Romantic Songs; Britten's sets Two French Folk Songs and Three French Folk Songs, and Rawsthorne's Three French Nursery Songs. From the French repertoire she recorded Chabrier's "Villanelle des petits canards" and "Les cigales"; Debussy's "L'échelonnement des haies"; Duparc's "Chanson triste"; Fauré's La bonne chanson, "Aurore" (Op. 39/1), "Les roses d'Ispahan" (Op. 39/4) and "Les berceaux" (Op. 23/1); and Ravel's "Nicolette". Her accompanists included Britten and Kathleen Long. In 2012 Symposium Records released recordings made by Wyss in the 1950s. They were: Louis Durey's Images à Crusoé; George Enescu's Sept chansons de Clément Marot; Arthur Honegger's Six poésies de Jean Cocteau; Frank Martin's Trois Chants de Noël; and Jules Massenet's Poème d'Avril.

== Notes, references and sources ==
Notes

Sources

- Bridcut, John (2010). The Faber Pocket Guide to Britten. London: Faber and Faber. ISBN 978-0-571-23776-0.
- Britten, Benjamin (1991a). Donald Mitchell (ed.). Letters From a Life: The Selected Letters of Benjamin Britten, Volume 1, 1923–39. London: Faber and Faber. ISBN 057115221X.
- Britten, Benjamin (1991b). Donald Mitchell (ed.). Letters From a Life: The Selected Letters of Benjamin Britten, Volume 2, 1939–45. London: Faber and Faber. ISBN 0571160581.
- Kildea, Paul (2013). Benjamin Britten: A Life in the Twentieth Century. London: Penguin Books. ISBN 9781846142338.
- Matthews, David (2013). Britten. London: Haus Publishing. ISBN 978-1908323385.
- Plant, Andrew (2001). "Darnton, (Philip) Christian". Grove Music Online (8th ed.). Oxford University Press. doi:10.1093/gmo/9781561592630.article.07225. ISBN 978-1-56159-263-0.
