= Les Illuminations (Britten) =

Song cycle by Benjamin Britten

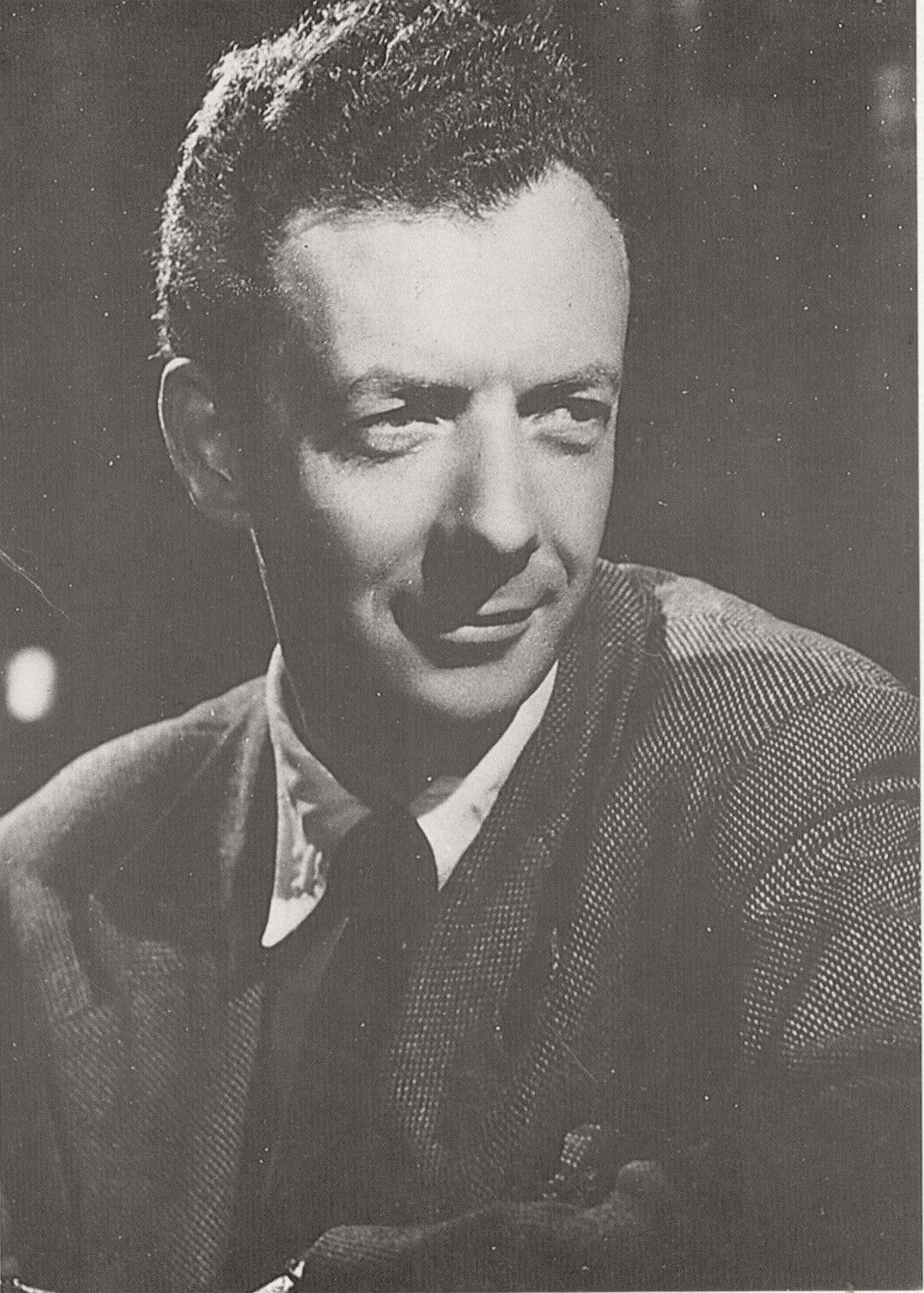
Benjamin Britten in the 1940s

Les Illuminations (The Illuminations), Op. 18, is a song cycle by Benjamin Britten, first performed in 1940. It is composed for soprano or tenor soloist and string orchestra, and sets verse and prose poems written in 1872–1873 by Arthur Rimbaud, part of his collection Les Illuminations.

== History ==
Britten began writing the cycle in Suffolk in March 1939 and completed it a few months later in the United States. It was the first of his song cycles to gain widespread popularity. The cycle was originally written for a soprano; Britten's biographer David Matthews comments that the work is "so much more sensuous when sung by the soprano voice for which the songs were conceived". Nevertheless the work can be, and more often is, sung by a tenor: Britten conducted the piece with Peter Pears as soloist within two years of the premiere.

The first performance of the cycle was given on 30 January 1940 at the Aeolian Hall, London, by Sophie Wyss, to whom the cycle is dedicated. (There are also dedications for individual sections.) Boyd Neel conducted his string orchestra.

== Structure ==
The work takes about 21 minutes in performance. The nine sections are:

- 1. Fanfare
- 2. Villes
- 3a and 3b. Phrase and Antique
- 4. Royauté
- 5. Marine
- 6. Interlude
- 7. Being beauteous
- 8. Parade
- 9. Départ

The work begins with a single sentence (taken from the poem "Parade") "J'ai seul la clef de cette parade sauvage" ("I alone have the key to this savage parade"). Seemingly, Britten takes this to mean that only the artist, observing the world with detachment, can make sense of the "savage parade" that is human life. The sentence is sung three times during the cycle.

== Recordings ==
Les Illuminations has been frequently recorded. Among the tenor versions is a 1963 set by Pears and the composer with the English Chamber Orchestra. Soprano versions include those by Jill Gomez and John Whitfield with the Endymion Ensemble (recorded 1987) and Felicity Lott and Steuart Bedford with the English Chamber Orchestra (recorded 1994).

== Ballet versions ==
The work has been choreographed by Sir Frederick Ashton and Richard Alston.
