= Tim Frazer =

Tim Frazer may refer to:

- The World of Tim Frazer, a 1960 British television series written by Francis Durbridge
- Tim Frazer (TV series), a 1963 West German television
- Tim Frazer and the Mysterious Mister X, a 1964 Austrian-Belgian film directed by Ernst Hofbauer
