= Portrait of Alison (TV series) =

1955 British TV crime thriller series

- Genre: Thriller; Mystery fiction
- Created by: Francis Durbridge
- Starring: Patrick Barr; Lockwood West; Anthony Nicholls
- Country of origin: United Kingdom
- Original language: English
- No. of series: 1
- No. of episodes: 6 (all missing)

Production
- Producer: Alan Bromly
- Running time: 30 minutes

Original release
- Network: BBC
- Release: 16 February – 23 March 1955

Portrait of Alison was a 1955 British six-part television series featuring Patrick Barr, Lockwood West, Anthony Nicholls and Brian Wilde. A crime-based thriller written by Francis Durbridge, it aired in six half-hour episodes between February and March 1955.

It is unknown if the live broadcasts were ever telerecorded. The series is missing from the archives.

== Cast ==
- Patrick Barr as Tim Forester
- Lockwood West as DI Layton
- Anthony Nicholls as Major Colby
- Brian Wilde as David Forester
- Arnold Bell as Norman Briggs
- Peter Dyneley as Henry Carmichael
- William Lucas as Reg Dorking
- Helen Shingler as Alison Ford
- William Kendall as Peter Fenby
- Elaine Wodson as Mary Hepburn
- Edward Dentith as DS Reed
- Elaine Dundy as Jill Stewart
- Gretchen Franklin as Chambermaid
- Patrick Jordan as Charles White
- Anne Ridler as Nurse
- Grace Webb as Hospital sister

== Film version ==
A feature film Portrait of Alison based on the series was released in cinemas in 1956, starring Robert Beatty and Terry Moore. A similar cinematic release had followed a previous Durbridge serial The Broken Horseshoe in 1952.
