= The Broken Horseshoe =

The Broken Horseshoe may refer to:

- The Broken Horseshoe (film), 1953 British crime film
- The Broken Horseshoe (TV series), 1952 British TV series
