= Philip Odell =

- Genre: Radio serial
- Country of origin: United Kingdom
- Language: English
- Home station: BBC Light Programme
- Starring: Robert Beatty; Brenda Bruce; Joy Shelton; Joyce Heron; Sheila Manahan; Diana Olsson
- Created by: Lester Powell
- Original release: 6 October 1947 – 24 July 1961
- No. of episodes: 62

Philip Odell was the protagonist of a number of serialised radio mysteries broadcast on the BBC Light Programme between 1947 and 1961. Created by Lester Powell, Odell was an Irish private investigator played by Canadian actor Robert Beatty.

== Premise ==
Originally from Dublin, Odell was employed as a secret service agent in America during World War II. At the start of the first serial Lady in a Fog, he is in London, preparing to depart back home to Ireland. He stops off to share a drink with his old friend Heather McMara who beseeches him to investigate her brother's mysterious death. Following this investigation, he sets up shop as a private detective in London, with Heather becoming his assistant.

== Episodes ==
Beatty appeared across all the episodes, whilst Heather was played by five different actresses. A majority of the programmes are missing from the BBC archives. The sole serving serials are the 1958 version of Lady in a Fog and Test Room Eight, both of which have since been rebroadcast and released on BBC home media.

- Lady in a Fog (6 October – 24 November 1947) (eight episodes, Brenda Bruce as Heather)
- An Assassin for Christmas (25 December 1947) (40 minute Christmas special, Brenda Bruce as Heather)
- The Odd Story of Simon Ode (7 June – 26 July 1948) (eight episodes, Joy Shelton as Heather)
- Spot the Lady (25 April – 13 June 1949) (eight episodes, Brenda Bruce as Heather)
- The Night of the Twenty Seventh (27 December 1949) (Christmas special written by Edward J. Mason, featuring numerous popular BBC Radio characters including Odell, Paul and Steve Temple, Dick Barton, PC 49, the Man in Black and Dr. and Mrs Dale)
- Love from Leighton Buzzard (4 April – 23 May 1950) (eight episodes, Joyce Heron as Heather)
- The Lady on the Screen (16 February – 5 April 1952) (eight episodes, Joyce Heron as Heather)
- Lady in a Fog (remake of the first serial) (29 April – 17 June 1958) (eight episodes, Sheila Manahan as Heather)
- Test Room Eight (22 December 1958 – 26 January 1959) (six episodes, Sheila Manahan as Heather)
- Tea on the Island (19 June – 24 July 1961) (six episodes, Diana Olsson as Heather)

== Novels ==
Powell penned a set of Odell novels. Some were novelisations of the serials, others were original stories.

- A Count of Six (1948) (Depicts Odell in his secret service days, foiling a Nazi plot)
- Shadow Play (1949)
- Spot the Lady (1950)
- Still of Night (1952)
- The Black Casket (1953)

== Film ==
In 1952, Odell and Heather were brought to the silver screen in Lady in the Fog (Scotland Yard Inspector in the US), an adaptation of the original radio serial. Here, Odell (spelled O'Dell in the film) is depicted as an American writer. Cesar Romero played O'Dell, and Bernadette O'Farrell was Heather.
