= Sybille Binder =

Austrian actress (1895–1962)

- Photo by Edith Glogau
- Born: 5 January 1895; Vienna, Austria-Hungary
- Died: 30 June 1962 (aged 67); Düsseldorf, West Germany
- Occupation: Actress
- Years active: 1915–1962

Sybille Binder (5 January 1895 – 30 June 1962) was an Austrian actress of Jewish descent whose career of over 40 years was based variously in her home country, Germany and Britain, where she found success in films during the 1940s.

== Career ==
Binder began her stage career in Berlin in 1915, then in 1918 moved to Munich, where she enjoyed success in classical drama. Between 1916 and 1918 she also appeared in a handful of silent films. In 1922, she returned to Berlin and received acclaim for her performance in Frank Wedekind's Earth Spirit. Over the next few years she performed regularly in Germany and Austria then, in the mid-1930s as war approached and conditions in Germany became difficult, she made the decision to move to England.

Between 1942 and 1950 Binder featured in 13 British films, including several of superior quality. Her first screen appearance in Britain came auspiciously in the highly acclaimed supernatural drama Thunder Rock, playing opposite dramatic heavyweights including Michael Redgrave, James Mason and Frederick Valk. Other notable films in which Binder appeared were war drama Candlelight in Algeria (1944), hugely popular period melodrama Blanche Fury, espionage thriller Against the Wind and amnesia-themed romance Portrait from Life (all 1948).

Binder returned to Germany in 1950, settling in Düsseldorf, where she successfully picked up her stage career but did not attempt to break into the German film industry. She died on 30 June 1962, aged 67.

== Selected filmography ==
- The House of Three Girls (1918)
- Thunder Rock (1942)
- Yellow Canary (1943)
- The Night Invader (1943)
- Candlelight in Algeria (1944)
- The Man from Morocco (1945)
- Latin Quarter (1945)
- Counterblast (1948)
- Blanche Fury (1948)
- Idol of Paris (1948)
- Against the Wind (1948)
- Broken Journey (1948)
- Portrait from Life (1948)
- Golden Salamander (1950)
