= Paul Temple (TV series) =

British-German television series (1969–1971)

- Genre: Crime drama
- Created by: Francis Durbridge (novels)
- Starring: Francis Matthews; Ros Drinkwater; George Sewell
- No. of series: 4
- No. of episodes: 52 (36 missing)

Production
- Producers: Derrick Sherwin; Peter Bryant; Alan Bromly (Season 1 only)
- Running time: 50 minutes

Original release
- Network: BBC1; ZDF
- Release: 23 November 1969 – 1 September 1971

Paul Temple is a British-German television series that originally aired on BBC1 between 1969 and 1971. 52 episodes were made over four series, each episode having a running time of around 50 minutes.

== Overview ==
Paul Temple features Francis Matthews as Paul Temple, the fictional detective created by Francis Durbridge, who solves crimes with the assistance of his wife Steve (Ros Drinkwater). Series 1 of the Paul Temple television series was produced solely by the BBC, with all 13 episodes set in Great Britain. The first episode was transmitted in November 1969, becoming one of the first shows to be broadcast in colour on BBC1.

Starting with series 2, Paul Temple became a co-production by the BBC and Taurus Films of Munich, West Germany, and was shown internationally, with many of the episodes using overseas locations in West Germany, France, Malta and elsewhere. During the production of the second series, the producer Peter Bryant successfully persuaded Derrick Sherwin, at short notice, to join him on Paul Temple from the BBC series Doctor Who, on which they had previously worked together. There was some disagreement between the BBC and Taurus over the casting of Steve Temple (who had been played in the radio series of Paul Temple from 1945 to 1968 by Marjorie Westbury): the BBC wished to drop Ros Drinkwater from the role, but Taurus favoured her retention.

According to Francis Matthews, both Paul and Steve Temple became fashion icons of sorts, creating a style that was to be imitated in ITV's The Persuaders!, while, in America, Ros Drinkwater's role was reportedly emulated by Susan Saint James in McMillan & Wife and Stefanie Powers in Hart to Hart. According to Matthews, Drinkwater chose her own "very expensive" designer clothes for the part.

The series was intended to run for five years, but despite its popularity, especially in West Germany, the BBC withdrew prematurely after two. Huw Wheldon, the BBC's managing director for television, later explained to Matthews that it was really "Lew Grade territory" and cited the BBC's preference for such historical dramas as The Six Wives of Henry VIII and Elizabeth R. The series was allowed to peter out, the final episodes at least of the last season all based in Great Britain.

== Archive ==
The BBC never repeated Paul Temple. The series suffered badly in the BBC's wiping policy of the 1970s. Of the 52 episodes of Paul Temple that were made, only 16 survive. 11 of the surviving 16 episodes exist in colour, and these were re-run on UK Gold in its formative years in the 1990s. The other five episodes only survive as black and white telerecordings. The loss of Paul Temple episodes was such that, of the first two series, only one episode exists ("Games People Play", 19 April 1970). That episode was made completely on film and therefore was archived in the BBC's Film Library. Videotapes of 25 episodes from the first two seasons were wiped. The only telerecordings that are known to exist are the last five episodes of series 4, which are in black and white.

The visuals of some of the 36 missing episodes survive in the ZDF TV archives in Germany. These come from series 2 to 4, which were BBC-ZDF co-produced; however, they only have dubbed German soundtracks. Any BBC tape copies of missing episodes with their original English soundtracks intact are believed to be long-gone from the ZDF archive, with one exception (see below).

In 2016, a DVD was released in Germany containing most episodes from the fourth and final series, with German dubbing. The final five episodes were included in colour, containing both the dubbed German and original English soundtracks. While not every episode on the release contains its original English language soundtrack, one, "A Family Affair", does. "A Family Affair" does not appear to have been returned to the BBC archive, for it was not included on the Acorn DVD releases in the UK.

== DVD releases ==
In July 2009, Acorn Media released the 11 existing colour episodes (still held within the BBC archives) on DVD. These were cleared at the BBFC on 17 March 2009. In April 2012, Acorn Media released a DVD of the final five episodes. Although broadcast in colour, these five episodes were released in black and white, due to the BBC archive only having access to black-and-white copies of those episodes. Colour copies of the last five episodes do exist in an archive in Germany, and were released on DVD in Germany in 2016. However, Acorn Media did not use these recordings for the 2012 DVD release in the UK, instead relying on the BBC's monochrome copies. In August 2013, Acorn Media released all 16 of its previously issued episodes (11 in colour, five in black and white) on DVD, in a release titled Paul Temple: The Complete Collection.

In May 2016, the series began to appear in German-speaking countries, released by German DVD company Fernsehjuwelen (the name means 'TV jewels'). These DVD releases cover all the episodes of seasons 2, 3 and 4, across three different boxsets or as a complete set ('Gesamtedition'). This made many episodes from seasons 2–4 commercially available for the first time. The English audio - where available - has been added as an extra soundtrack.

== Main cast ==
- Francis Matthews as Paul Temple
- Ros Drinkwater as Steve Temple
- June Ellis as Kate Balfour
- George Sewell as Sammy Carson
- Blake Butler as Eric
- Derek Martin as Paddy

== Guest stars ==
The series also features performances from several guest stars including Peter Sallis, Tenniel Evans, Terence Edmond, John Stratton and Derek Newark.

== Episodes ==
=== Series 1 ===
#	Episode	Writer	Director	Original airdate	BBC archive status
1	Who Dies Next	Peter Miller	Douglas Camfield	23 November 1969	Missing
Paul and Steve arrive home to find they have been burgled. Curiously, nothing of value seems to have been taken, but books have been removed from the bookshelves as if someone had been searching through them. Searching for what?
2	Message from A Dead Man	John Roddick	Paul Ciappessoni	30 November 1969	Missing
Spending a weekend at Random Cottage, Paul and Steve are visited by a young American, who tells them he has heard a murder being arranged on the telephone. When Paul starts checking he finds that everything the American told him was untrue, but then a man is found dead.
3	There Must Be A Mr X	David Ellis	Eric Hills	7 December 1969	Missing
After an evening at a gambling club, Paul takes a hostess, Sandra, back to her flat. When Paul arrives home in the early hours of the morning he tells Steve he has been talking over old times with a friend. What is Paul up to?
4	Missing Penny	Cyril Abraham	Tina Wakerell	14 December 1969	Missing
Paul is told a strange story about a girl missing from a village not far from Random Cottage. He learns that she didn't drive a car and she didn't take the only bus to the nearest station. In fact, nobody saw her leave at all...
5	The Man Who Wasn't Really There	John Tully	Douglas Camfield	21 December 1969	Missing
A man known to Paul and Steve is reported killed in an air crash in Rome, but Steve is positive that the man called at the Temples' home shortly after the time given for the crash.
6	Which One of Us Is Me?	David Chantler	Paul Ciappessoni	28 December 1969	Missing
Paul is asked for help by a man called Howard Hawthorn. Apparently someone is intent on destroying Howard; his character, his marriage, his sanity. Paul asks who this someone is. Howard replies, 'Howard Hawthorn.'
7	Inside Information	David Ellis	Tina Wakerell	4 January 1970	Missing
A private enquiry agent calls to see Steve, who tells him she wants him to watch Paul. When the agent asks why, Steve says she suspects Paul of being unfaithful, and requires evidence for a divorce.
8	The Masked Lady	John Tully	Rex Tucker	11 January 1970	Missing
A film is being made in an ancestral home about the legend of the strange disappearance of the Masked Lady. A young girl playing the part also disappears.
9	Swan Song For Colonel Harp	David Chantler	Tina Wakerell	18 January 1970	Missing
Colonel Harp is one of the regulars at the Falcon. One day a stranger comes to see him, and Eric observes that the Colonel seems frightened. Shortly, it is announced that the Colonel is selling his house and moving to a cottage in the country. The stranger asks Eric to take a trunk down to the cottage, but the Colonel is not present. The stranger says the trunk contains books...
10	Mr Wallace Predicts	John Tully	Eric Hills	25 January 1970	Missing
Paul and Steve find themselves involved with Mr Wallace, a researcher into extra-sensory perception. But Mr Wallace has another talent that interests Paul: he can predict accidents. Unfortunately, the victims never seem to get his warnings in time.
11	Letters From Robert	John Tully	Prudence Fitzgerald	1 February 1970	Missing
Miss Rose Martin was once in love with a man called Robert Stanlake, who disappeared mysteriously 20 years ago. She starts getting letters, from someone who seems to know all about her, signed as Robert Stanlake.
12	The Man From the Sea	Cyril Abrahams	Philip Dudley	8 February 1970	Missing
Kate is taking a holiday at the seaside. Walking along the beach, she discovers a body washed up by the tide. A lighthouse keeper tells her he has sent for the police, but Kate later discovers the police have no knowledge of the body.
13	The Victim	David Whitaker	Douglas Camfield	15 February 1970	Missing
Peter Tremayne, a rich industrialist, is being persecuted by someone. He thinks his persecutor is an old enemy, but Paul has other ideas.

=== Series 2 ===
#	Episode	Writer	Director	Original airdate	BBC archive status
14	Right Villain	Derrick Sherwin	Ken Hannam	5 April 1970	Missing
Paul is literally 'taken for a ride' when he contemplates buying a new car. Sammy Carson, ex-villain and part-owner of the garage involved, offers Paul the car in exchange for his help – which he badly needs!
15	Kill Or Cure	Bill Strutton	Christopher Barry	12 April 1970	Missing
Steve's friend Ilse Goetz visits London with her uncle, a pharmaceutical manufacturer. After contacting the Temple's, she disappears – and when Paul investigates, her uncle warns him not to get involved...
16	Games People Play	John Gould	Philip Dudley	19 April 1970	Exists
While in Malta, Paul and Steve are drawn into the 'sweet life' of a group for whom luxury has become a necessity – a life that soon lures the innocent beyond boredom into danger.
17	The Artnappers	Bill Strutton	Ken Hannam	26 April 1970	Missing
Gallery raids and art thefts are becoming increasingly commonplace – often the only losers appear to be the insurance companies. Paul finds that even they can limit their liability to pay by investing in crime...
18	The Black Room	Moris Farhi	Christopher Barry	3 May 1970	Missing
How deeply within ourselves can we bury the effects of violence? Paul discovers methods by which unscrupulous men use a victim's past to force their way into a frightening future.
19	Antique Death: Part 1	Michael Chapman	John Matthews	10 May 1970	Missing
Paul is amused when he discovers that the copy of an Etruscan Apollo which he has bought causes a ripple of alarm in museum circles as the original is reputed to be unique and no other copy is known to exist. But when the figurine disappears, the chase leads Paul to Amsterdam and into the dangers that lie beyond the respectable front of dealing in `genuine' art-fakes.
20	Antique Death: Part 2	Michael Chapman	John Matthews	17 May 1970	Missing
Paul moves from Amsterdam to Bruges in his search for the Arezzo Apollo figurine which has been stolen from him. The death of Genevieve Duclos leads him closer to those responsible and deeper into the dangerous world of organised international crime.
21	Double Vision	Jeremy Burnham	Ken Hannam	24 May 1970	Missing
Paul, on a visit to Edinburgh to attend a crime writers' conference, is asked by a beautiful young German girl to read her first novel. A charming girl; an innocent request; but, it turns out, the book appears to be in great demand...
22	Steal A Little Happiness	Bill Strutton	Philip Dudley	28 June 1970	Missing
Paul and Steve pick up a hitchhiking street urchin called Gina outside Milan, and soon discover the pressures that poverty brings to bear on the young. In an attempt to help the girl, Paul uncovers a relationship between Gina and Ettore, a helpless old man, that is based on need rather than on cupidity.
23	The Suitcase	John Tully	John Matthews	5 July 1970	Missing
A Secret Service plot or the bitter end to a tangled domestic quarrel? This is the fascinating question facing Paul Temple when a suitcase explodes in a Surrey country house.
24	Murder In Munich: Part 1	David Roberts	Michael Ferguson	12 July 1970	Missing
Temple, on a visit to Munich, is horrified to find that he has been mistaken for an assassin. Worse still, he is expected to proceed with, and complete, the killer's assignment.
25	Murder In Munich: Part 2	David Roberts	Michael Ferguson	19 July 1970	Missing
Temple, cleverly framed for murder on a visit to Munich, must make a life-and-death race against time to prove his innocence.
26	Re-Take	Paul Erickson	Douglas Camfield	26 July 1970	Missing
What is the connection between a series of crimes in Rome seven years ago and the disappearance of a child in London now?

=== Series 3 ===
#	Episode	Writer	Director	Original airdate	BBC archive status
27	House Of the Dead	David Roberts	George Spenton-Foster	10 January 1971	Missing
Paul Temple receives a strange invitation to an abandoned house to investigate a five-year-old murder.
28	Sea Burial	David Roberts	Ronald Wilson	17 January 1971	Missing
On a visit to Sweden, Paul Temple receives a mysterious summons that pitchforks him on to the trail of an ingenious and unusual crime.
29	Night Train	Michael J. Bird	Douglas Camfield	24 January 1971	Missing
Coincidence, perhaps? Or does the appearance of Freddie Price as a sleeping car attendant on the Temples' train have a more sinister significance?
30	Corrida	Lindsay Galloway	Ken Hannam	7 February 1971	Exists
Bulls and Christian Martyrs. That's the toll throughout the centuries at the ancient arena in Arles. Is the bullring about to be used for another sport – like the killing of escaped criminals?
31	Death For Drivers' Reasons	John Lucarotti	Ken Hannam	14 February 1971	Missing
A quiet stretch of coastline holds all sorts of menacing surprises for Paul and Steve's yachting weekend.
32	A Greek Tragedy	Lindsay Galloway	George Spenton-Foster	21 February 1971	Missing
Tragedy? Or a menacing conspiracy of silence? What exactly is going on in the small mountainside village in Greece? And what is the tie-up with those grim events as far back as the winter of 1944?
33	The Specialists	Michael Winder	Eric Price	28 February 1971	Exists
Strange people – specialists. Bodyguard one day – the next assassin. Very efficient and reliable to the man who pays him – first.
34	Has Anybody Here Seen Kelly?	Dennis Spooner	Eric Price	7 March 1971	Exists
Very efficient these Intelligence Agents. Almost clever enough to conceal the truth from the Temples as they make a surprise visit on an old friend in a small Riviera fishing port.
35	Requiem For A Don	Jeremy Burnham	Christopher Barry	14 March 1971	Missing
Suicide? Or murder? Temple's investigation into the death of an old friend causes a lot of long faces in a famous Midlands University town.
36	Motel	David Simon	Simon Langton	21 March 1971	Exists
Why should a lonely Scottish motel be the gathering point for a gang of criminals?
37	Cue Murder!	David Simon	George Spenton-Foster	28 March 1971	Exists
Tension and drama build up to a breathless climax as Paul reveals a murderer before a television audience.
38	Death Of Fasching	Wolf Rilla	Viktor Ritelis	4 April 1971	Exists
Paul takes a strange partner at a Fasching Ball in Munich – and thereafter has to watch his step.
39	Catch Your Death	Patrick Alexander	Frank Cox	11 April 1971	Exists
Paul and Sammy between them track down a dangerous thief – and nearly catch a nasty cold!

=== Series 4 ===
#	Episode	Writer	Director	Original airdate	BBC archive status
40	Paper Chase	Jeremy Burnham	George Spenton-Foster	9 June 1971	Missing
A glimpse under the covers for Paul of secret political warfare in London.
41	Death Sentence	David Ellis	Douglas Camfield	16 June 1971	Missing
Susan Grant hasn't an enemy in the world – so why do they want to kill her?
42	Ricochet	Marc Brandel	Darrol Blake	23 June 1971	Exists
Paul, on a visit to St Moritz with Steve to meet his accountant, soon finds he has other problems on his mind than facts and figures.
43	With Friends Like You, Who Needs Enemies?	Victor Canning	Michael Ferguson	30 June 1971	Exists
Sammy Carson is accused of murder, with surprising results.
44	Party Piece	Lindsay Galloway	Ken Hannam	7 July 1971	Missing
Sammy meets up with a jazz pianist friend, and involves Paul in a crime of considerable ingenuity.
45	The Quick and the Dead	Derry Quinn	George Spenton-Foster	14 July 1971	Exists
The old priests have been dead for centuries, and they can't harm anybody.
46	The Man Who Forged Real Money	John Lucarotti	Ken Hannam	21 July 1971	Missing
An African Embassy in London makes good cover, for a clever international conspiracy.
47	A Family Affair	Wolf Rilla	David Maloney	28 July 1971	Missing (BBC); Exists (ZDF)
Paul takes a sea trip to Hamburg – and a nose-dive into a ruthless story of family treachery.
48	The Guilty Must Die	John Tully	Douglas Camfield	4 August 1971	Exists
Paul goes away to the country for a few days leaving Steve to witness a murder.
49	Game, Set and Match	Jeremy Burnham	Darrol Blake	11 August 1971	Exists
When Andy King, a veteran professional tennis player from Australia, arrives in Britain for another tournament, trouble isn't far behind.
50	Long Ride to Red Gap	John Wiles	George Spenton-Foster	18 August 1971	Exists
Sammy, on a car journey near Godalming, claims to have been ambushed and attacked by a band of Red Indians. And he's not joking!
51	Winner Take All	Donald James	Christopher Barry	25 August 1971	Exists
Against a horseracing background, Paul finds himself involved in a takeover bid between two sides in a large criminal organisation.
52	Critics, Yes! But This Is Ridiculous!	Eddie Boyd	Michael Ferguson	1 September 1971	Exists
A midnight intruder into a small Scottish library rips apart several of Paul's novels. Is he settling an old score? Or do his actions have a much more menacing reason?
