= Against the Wind (1948 film) =

1948 British film by Charles Crichton

- Release poster
- Directed by: Charles Crichton
- Written by: T.E.B. Clarke; Michael Pertwee; J. Elder Wills
- Produced by: Michael Balcon
- Starring: Robert Beatty; Simone Signoret; Jack Warner; Gordon Jackson
- Cinematography: Lionel Banes; Paul Beeson
- Edited by: Alan Osbiston
- Music by: Leslie Bridgwater
- Color process: Black and white
- Production company: Ealing Studios
- Distributed by: General Film Distributors
- Release date: 1948
- Running time: 96 minutes
- Country: United Kingdom
- Language: English
- Budget: £202,330
- Box office: £94,995 (UK)

Against the Wind is a 1948 British war film directed by Charles Crichton and produced by Michael Balcon starring Robert Beatty, Jack Warner and Simone Signoret (in her first English-language film role).

It is a sabotage/resistance drama set in occupied Belgium.

== Plot ==
Roman Catholic priest Fr Elliott goes to the Natural History Museum to meet a section-head in the wartime British Special Operations Executive. On accepting his offer to train for covert operations behind enemy lines in Belgium, he meets a disparate group of existing recruits, including Michèle the Belgian émigrée (Signoret), whose sweetheart has died after the occupation of Belgium, Emile, who misses his family, and Julie, who flirts with Fr Elliott despite his celibate status. Michèle's motives are initially questioned before she is finally given the green light for operations abroad. On completion of their training Fr Elliott and Julie are parachuted into Belgium, briefed to destroy a Nazi records office in Brussels and to spring prominent SOE agent Andrew from custody, but Julie is killed during the drop.

A wanted man in Belgium after past missions, Emile is sent for plastic surgery to allow him to go on another. He finds out that his wife has in fact managed to leave occupied Belgium and goes to meet her, risking his dismissal. However, as he did not speak to her and was not recognised by her, he is given the benefit of the doubt by his section-head. In the meantime another agent, Max, goes to meet his contact with the Germans, to whom he is willing to betray the Belgian network for money. As Max, Emile, wireless operator Michèle and explosives expert Scotty are flown to Belgium, the police inform SOE that the contact, who is Irish, is on their 'watch list' and that Max is thus a double-agent. It is too late to recall the plane and the whole group parachutes into Belgium as planned, but soon afterwards Michèle executes Max after receiving a radio message revealing his treachery. She also begins to fall in love with Scotty.

The records office is successfully destroyed and Jacques, another SOE agent working undercover as a Belgian Fascist Quisling, manages to get word to Fr Elliott on Andrew's prison arrangements. Their attempt to spring him from jail is foiled by an untimely RAF bombing raid, however, and Scotty begins suffering from toothache due to his damp hideout in a church crypt. The group attempt to get him to a dentist, but his poor French accent leads to his arrest by the Gestapo. Jacques manages to effect Scotty's escape, but at the cost of his cover and life. The remaining agents then manage to hijack the train taking Andrew to Germany, evade the Germans pursuing them and finally get him safely on a night-flight back to Britain.

== Cast ==
- Robert Beatty as Father Philip Elliot
- Simone Signoret as Michèle Denis
- Jack Warner as Max Cronk
- Gordon Jackson as John "Scotty" Duncan
- Paul Dupuis as Jacques Picquart
- Gisèle Préville as Julie
- James Robertson Justice as Ackerman
- André Morell as Abbott
- Eugene Deckers as Marcel van Hecke
- John Slater as Emile Meyer
- Peter Illing as Andrew
- Sybille Binder as Florence Malou
- Andrew Blackett as Frankie
- Arthur Lawrence as Capt. Verreker

== Reception ==
Against the Wind performed only modestly at the box-office and received a mixed critical reception, with reviews ranging from the favourable ("This little film about a batch of saboteurs in wartime Belgium is...tense and artistic. It is a pleasing and worthwhile film") to the unimpressed ("Against the Wind...has the aspect of contrived melodrama and a minimum of the truth behind the sabotage of World War II. Despite an experienced cast, Against the Wind is unconvincing fare.") A frequent criticism levelled at the film was that the early scene-setting section was somewhat jerky in style, with sketchy attempts to provide back-stories for the main protagonists leaving many viewers rather confused as to what exactly was going on. The performances of the lead actors tended to be commented on in vague faint-praise terms such as "competent" and "proficient".

The film earned distributor's gross receipts of £94,995 in the UK of which £81,436 went to the producer.
