= Lady in the Fog =

1952 British film by Sam Newfield

- Directed by: Sam Newfield
- Written by: Lester Powell (BBC Radio play); Orville H. Hampton (screenplay)
- Produced by: Anthony Hinds
- Starring: Cesar Romero; Lois Maxwell; Bernadette O'Farrell; Mary Mackenzie
- Cinematography: Walter J. Harvey
- Edited by: James Needs
- Music by: Ivor Slaney
- Production company: Hammer Film Productions
- Distributed by: Exclusive Films (UK); Lippert Pictures (US)
- Release date: 13 October 1952
- Running time: 82 minutes
- Country: United Kingdom
- Language: English

Lady in the Fog (U.S. title: Scotland Yard Inspector) is a 1952 British mystery film directed by Sam Newfield and starring Cesar Romero, Lois Maxwell and Bernadette O'Farrell. It was written by Orville H. Hampton based on the 1947 BBC radio serial A Lady in the Fog by Lester Powell. The film began production on 24 March 1952, was trade shown on 10 Sept. 1952, and was released on 13 Oct. 1952. It was made by Lippert Productions and Hammer Films at the Riverside Studios in Hammersmith. The film's sets were designed by the art director Wilfred Arnold. The film was unusual for a British movie since it had an American director, an American writer and an American actor in the lead.

== Plot ==
In London an English woman, Heather McMara, asks for help from a visiting American writer, Philip 'Phil' O'Dell, to find out who has killed her brother, Danny, who was run over in a heavy nighttime fog. Having no evidence, the police will take no action.

O'Dell and McMara visit Peggy's nightclub which Danny frequented, and there they learn Danny's last address. O'Dell finds Danny's hotel room has been ransacked and he is knocked out by a man hiding in the room, but finds a tape recording. Among Danny's correspondence is a letter leading O'Dell to an actress, Marilyn Durant. Durant is despondent over a break-up with Danny. Durant mentions a producer, Christopher Hampden, with whom Danny had arranged a screen test for her. That too appears to be a blind alley. However, a speeding car tries to run O'Dell down, and he finds his own quarters ransacked, leading him to conclude he is onto something and he cancels his plans to leave London for the United States. He also confesses romantic feelings for McMara.

O'Dell listens to the tape recording of a distraught man recounting a garage fire he was forced to set in Gladstone which killed someone called George. O'Dell attempts to replay it for McMara, but accidentally erases the tape; nonetheless he remembers enough to pursue the lead. He learns the man killed was a George Maybrick whose partners, Christopher Hampden and Martin Sorrowby, relocated to London afterwards with Mrs. Margaret Maybrick.

O'Dell returns to Hampden who stonewalls him, but mentions that Sorrowby cracked up during the war and was in a mental hospital at the time he died, two years ago. Receiving conflicting information at the hospital, O'Dell sneaks in and learns Sorrowby is still there. Sorrowby readily admits that Margaret Maybrick made Sorrowby and Hampden murder her husband; however Sorrowby also says he is insane and cannot distinguish fact from fantasy. Sorrowby slips out of the hospital, but is run down and killed by Hampden's henchman, Connors.

O'Dell tells McMara he believes her brother Danny was blackmailing Hampden. McMara believes this places O'Dell in danger. Checking a bombed building for clues, O'Dell is knocked out by an assailant. McMara is visited by nightclub owner Peggy who says she will bring her to Hampden. Peggy wraps herself in a distinctive scarf last seen on Danny's killer. It is another very foggy night, and Peggy asks McMara to walk ahead with a flashlight, intending to run her down, but the car stalls and the fog clears. At Hampden's, McMara learns Peggy is Margaret and married to Hampden. O'Dell arrives in time to rescue McMara. Connors and Hampden are killed and Margaret is apparently killed in a car accident, fleeing the scene. O'Dell and McMara then leave for the U.S. together.

== Cast ==
- Cesar Romero as Philip 'Phil' O'Dell
- Lois Maxwell as Margaret 'Peggy' Maybrick
- Bernadette O'Farrell as Heather McMara
- Geoffrey Keen as Christopher Hampden
- Campbell Singer as Inspector Rigby
- Alastair Hunter as Det. Sgt. Reilly
- Mary Mackenzie as Marilyn Durant
- Lloyd Lamble as Martin Sorrowby
- Frank Birch as Boswell, the airport manager
- Wensley Pithey as Sid, the bartender
- Reed De Rouen as Connors, the thug
- Peter Swanwick as Smithers
- Bill Fraser as sales manager
- Lisa Lee as Donna Devore
- Lionel Harris as Allan Mellon
- Betty Cooper as Dr. Campbell, asylum superintendent
- Katie Johnson as Mad Mary, witness at murder scene
- Clare James as Miss Andrews
- Jacques Ceyas head waiter
- Jean Bayliss as Delmont switchboard operator
- Richard Johnson as Danny McMara
- Stuart Nichol as Steve
- Marguerite Brennan as 2nd receptionist
- Robert Adair as film director
- Dorinda Stevens as girl at film studio (uncredited)

== Reception ==
The Monthly Film Bulletin wrote: "Routine mystery with Cesar Romero somewhat miscast as the reporter and some unconvincingly Americanised English settings."

Kine Weekly wrote: "The picture is a trifle overcrowded, but, despite some confusion, it puts plenty of variety and no little kick into its dizzy surface action. Cesar Romero as Odell is always on his toes, and Bernadette O'Farrell registers in contrast as the quiet, ladylike, though by no means acquiescent, Heather. The supporting players are more obvious, but all make their presence felt in a glorious free-for-all studio showdown."
