= William Lucas (actor) =

English actor (1925–2016)

- William Lucas playing Dr. James Gordon in The Adventures of Black Beauty (1972–1974)
- Born: William Thomas Clucas; 14 April 1925; Manchester, Lancashire, England
- Died: 8 July 2016 (aged 91); London, England
- Years active: 1950–2005
- Spouses: Rowena Ingram 1954–1992 (divorced) (2 children); Camilla Idris-Jones 1993–2016

William Thomas Clucas (14 April 1925 – 8 July 2016), better known as William Lucas, was an English film, theatre, radio and television actor.

== Early years ==
William Lucas was born in Manchester, England. Before he became an actor, he was a commercial traveller, laundry hand, cook, farm labourer, and long-distance lorry driver, and served in the Royal Navy during the Second World War.

== Career ==
Lucas earned a scholarship to the Northern Theatre School, and trained there. He then became an assistant stage manager at the Chesterfield Civic Theatre in the late 1940s. Lucas had begun his stage career by the summer of 1950 in Chesterfield and was still active in the theatre in late 1990 in Run for Your Wife.

His first film acting role was in the film Portrait of Alison (1955), and he later appeared in many Hammer Film Productions such as The Shadow of the Cat (1961).

He starred in a string of British crime b-movies such as Payroll, The Break, Breakout and Calculated Risk. He usually played strong villain-types (lead villains), but he also played unhinged, weak characters.

Lucas is probably best known for his role in The Adventures of Black Beauty (1972–1974) as Dr James Gordon, and in the BBC series Sir Arthur Conan Doyle's Sherlock Holmes as Inspector Lestrade in the episode "A Study in Scarlet" (1968). He also appeared in The Bill, Doctor Who, Last of the Summer Wine, Sir Francis Drake (TV series) and the ITV soap opera Coronation Street.

== Personal life ==
In 1954 Lucas married Doreen Moorehouse (whose stage name was Rowena Ingram). They had two children. After they divorced he married Camilla Idris-Jones.

== Death ==
Lucas died in England on 8 July 2016.

== Filmography ==
=== Film ===
- Timeslip (1955) – X-Ray Technician (uncredited)
- Portrait of Alison (1955) – Reg Dorking
- Lost (1956) – Press Photographer (uncredited)
- X the Unknown (1956) – Peter Elliott
- Up in the World (1956) – Mick Bellman
- High Flight (1957) – Controller (Cranwell)
- Breakout (1959) – Chandler
- Sons and Lovers (1960) – William Morel
- Crack in the Mirror (1960) – Kerstner
- The Professionals (1960) – Philip Bowman
- Payroll (1961) – Dennis Pearson
- The Shadow of the Cat (1961) – Jacob Venable
- The Devil's Daffodil (1961) – Jack Tarling (English Version)
- Touch of Death (1961) – Pete Mellor
- The Break (1962) – Jacko Thomas
- The Very Edge (1963) – Inspector Davis
- Bitter Harvest (1963) – Mr. Medwin
- The Marked One (1963) – Don Mason
- Calculated Risk (1963) – Steve
- Dateline Diamonds (1966) – Major Fairclough
- Night of the Big Heat (1967) – Ken Stanley
- The Sky Bike (1967) – Mr. Smith
- Scramble (1970) – (uncredited)
- Tower of Evil (1972) – Inspector Hawk
- Man at the Top (1973) – Marshall
- Operation Daybreak (1975) – Doctor (Sonja's Father) (uncredited)
- The Plague Dogs (1982) – Civil Servant #5 (voice)

=== Television ===
- Portrait of Alison (1955) – Reg Dorking
- Solo for Canary (1958) – Durea
- Champion Road (1958) – Jonathan Briggs
- The Adventures of Robin Hood (1958) – Sir Jack of Southwark
- The Infamous John Friend (1959, BBC) – John Friend
- The Adventures of William Tell (1959) – Kramer
- Danger Man (1960) as Colonel Vasco in the episode "The Prisoner"
- Sir Francis Drake (1962) – Count Julio
- Danger Man (1965) – Bernhard in the episode "A Room in the Basement"
- The Saint (1965, Episode: "Crime of the Century") as Crantor
- Z-Cars (1965–1967) – Det. Insp. Carter / Frank Jordan
- The Avengers (1967–1968) – Brett / Stapley
- The Prisoner (1967–1968)
- Sir Arthur Conan Doyle's Sherlock Holmes (1968, Episode: "A Study in Scarlet") – Inspector Lestrade
- Dixon of Dock Green (1968–1971) – Sawyer / Philip Chapman
- Doctor at Large (1971) – QC Mortimer Turnbull
- Coronation Street (1971, 1996) – Dennis Maxwell/Judge Parrish
- The Adventures of Black Beauty (1972–1974) – Dr. James Gordon
- 'Justice' (1973) – Chief Constable
- The Protectors (1973) – Eastbrook
- The Spoils of War (1980–1981) – George Hayward
- Doctor Who (1984, Episode: "Frontios") – Mr Range
- The New Adventures of Black Beauty (1990–1992) – Dr. James Gordon
- On the Up (1992) – Sir Douglas Hoyle
- Eldorado (1992–1993) – Stanley Webb
- Last of the Summer Wine (2003) – Norris
