= Portrait of Alison =

1955 British film by Guy Green

- US film poster
- Directed by: Guy Green
- Written by: Guy Green; Ken Hughes
- Based on: story by Francis Durbridge
- Produced by: Frank Godwin executive Tony Owen
- Starring: Terry Moore; Robert Beatty; William Sylvester
- Cinematography: Wilkie Cooper
- Edited by: Peter Taylor
- Music by: John Veale
- Production company: Insignia Films
- Distributed by: Anglo-Amalgamated Film Distributors
- Release dates: 19 December 1955 (UK); 18 January 1956 (US)
- Running time: 84 minutes
- Country: United Kingdom
- Language: English

Portrait of Alison (alternative titles: Postmark for Danger and Alison) is a 1955 British crime film directed by Guy Green and starring Terry Moore, Robert Beatty and William Sylvester. It was written by Green and Ken Hughes based on the BBC Television series Portrait of Alison which aired the same year.

It was one of many crime films starring imported actors made by Anglo-Amalgamated.

== Plot ==
A car plunges over a cliff in Italy. Both passengers, newspaperman Lewis Forrester and actress Alison Ford, are killed.

In London, Lewis's brother, Tim, is an artist. He is creating a beer advertisement, using his favourite model, Jill. She and Tim used to date, but Jill wants to settle down and knows Tim is not the marrying kind. She starts a relationship with the rich Henry Carmichael, who asks her to marry him. Jill accepts and leaves her job as a model kissing Tim to say goodbye. A third brother, Dave, a pilot, leaves England to travel to Italy to see to Lewis' remains.

Tim receives an unusual commission from a Mr Smith, to paint Smith's dead daughter, Alison, the other car crash victim. Smith gives Tim a photo to work from and a beautiful pink dress to use in the picture. Jill visits to collect some of her items she forgot, she sees the dress and admires both it and the portrait of Alison. She leaves to meet her fiancé for lunch, but forgets a parcel from abroad she was carrying which she had picked up for Henry.

On the night Dave returns to England, he is picked up by Tim. As they return to Tim's flat, they both find Jill, dead in Tim's bedroom, wearing the pink dress. The face on the portrait has been spoiled by paint and the photo on which it was based has disappeared. The police are called, as they investigate the murder, the parcel is remembered and opened. It contains an empty distinctive bottle of Spanish Chianti with a British label, "Nightingale & Son" – a firm that does not exist. The police aware of a postcard from Rome, posted by Lewis to an unknown recipient; it features a sketch of, again, a distinctive Chianti bottle. This new connexion now makes the police think Tim is the prime suspect in the murder.

Alison is not dead, she appears at Tim's door and explains that the woman killed in the car crash was not her; when they were driving, Lewis told her that he was on to an international diamond smuggling ring, and that her father was part of it. She angrily left the car, and assumes that Lewis must later have picked up a hitch-hiker, whose dead body was then mistaken for hers. She thinks Lewis was deliberately killed, but wants to be sure that her father did not know that the "accident" in the car was to occur.

Tim invites the police to his flat to prove that Alison is alive, but she disappears and tracks down her father, who is in a hotel. She tries to make him tell the truth about the diamond smuggling, but he is terrified, and plans to flee the country. Tim arrives as Mr Smith jumps from his window balcony attempting to commit suicide.

The postcard turns up eventually at Tim's flat. It holds the full names of all those involved in the diamond smuggling ring; including both the third brother, Dave, and Henry Carmichael, the fiancé of Jill. After Dave admits his guilt to Tim, they fight over the postcard. Tim wins and hands the card over to the police who work out the killer of Jill from revealing the hidden list of smugglers.

Alison had been tending to her father in hospital, who had survived his fall. She is escorted to Tim's flat by the police but not inside. As she enters the flat she finds Henry Carmichael, whom she recognises from Italy, which prompts Henry to try to strangle her to death. Tim arrives just in time to stop Henry and in the ensuing fight Henry falls through the first floor window to the street below.

In the aftermath of events, Tim and Alison are alone. He asks if she can stay with him until he completes her portrait. She asks how long this will take. When he answers "All my life", she replies "That's fine".

== Cast ==
- Terry Moore as Alison Ford
- Robert Beatty as Tim Forrester
- William Sylvester as Dave Forrester
- Geoffrey Keen as Inspector Colby
- Josephine Griffin as Jill Stewart
- Allan Cuthbertson as Henry Carmichael
- Henry Oscar as John Smith
- William Lucas as Reg Dorking
- Terence Alexander as Fenby
- Sam Kydd as Bill, telephone engineer

== Production ==
Film rights were bought by Tony Owen, the husband of Donna Reed who set up a film making operation in England. Ken Hughes co-wrote the script.

Guy Green said the story "was full of holes". He worked on the script with Ken Hughes "and we had to try to fill in all these holes." Frank Godwin says Hughes wrote the script in three days.

Terry Moore was borrowed from 20th Century Fox to star. Filming began in April 1955.

In May 1955 RKO agreed to distribute in the US.

== Critical reception ==
The Monthly Film Bulletin wrote: "Adapted from a television serial, this is a crime thriller in which most of the plot manoeuvres can be rather too readily foreseen. The story is moderately eventful, and direction and playing standard for the type".

In British Sound Films: The Studio Years 1928–1959 David Quinlan rated the film as "average", writing: "Smoothly-made jigsaw-type thriller".

British film critic Leslie Halliwell said: "Solidly carpentered mystery with all the twists expected from this source".
