= Bat Out of Hell (TV series) =

1966 British TV series

- Opening title card
- Genre: Thriller; Mystery
- Created by: Francis Durbridge
- Starring: Sylvia Syms; John Thaw; Dudley Foster
- Theme music composer: Dennis Farnon
- Country of origin: United Kingdom
- Original language: English
- No. of series: 1
- No. of episodes: 5

Production
- Producer: Alan Bromly
- Camera setup: Multi-camera
- Running time: 25 minutes

Original release
- Network: BBC Two
- Release: 26 November – 24 December 1966

Bat Out of Hell is a British five-part thriller television serial created by Francis Durbridge that originally aired on BBC Two from 26 November to 24 December 1966. The series followed two lovers, Diana Stewart (Sylvia Syms) and Mark Paxton (John Thaw), who are haunted by the voice of Diana's husband over the telephone after he is murdered by the couple. Inspector Clay (Dudley Foster) was the detective inspector who headed the police investigation.

== Situation ==
Diana Stewart (Sylvia Syms) and Mark Paxton (John Thaw), are in love, however, Diana's husband Geoffrey (Noel Johnson) is unlikely to grant her a divorce. When it is discovered that Geoffrey has a mistress, the two begin planning his murder. One night, as he is preparing to go on a month-long holiday, Mark shoots Diana's husband; Diana arrives shortly afterward to help him get rid of Geoffrey's body. They put it in the back of a car. Things start to go wrong when the body disappears from the car and Diana later receives a mysterious telephone call from her "deceased" husband. Diana is told by Geoffrey to meet him at a local motel or he will go to the police and have her arrested for attempted murder.

Much to Mark's dismay, she is told to come to the motel alone. Mark soon receives a phone call from a local shopkeeper, Kitty Tracey (Patsy Smart), who informs him that Diana has been arrested at the motel after the police discovered Geoffrey's body. This is not the case, and the couple believe they are "home and dry" until they are preyed upon by a mysterious blackmailer.

== Main characters ==
- Geoffrey Stewart (Noel Johnson) — a wealthy Sussex estate agent
- Diana Stewart (Sylvia Syms) — the wife of Geoffrey
- Mark Paxton (John Thaw) — the lover of Diana
- Inspector Clay (Dudley Foster) — a "deceptively easy-going" police detective investigating Geoffrey's disappearance
- Ned Tallboy (Stanley Meadows) - Garage owner and Landlord
- Thelma Bowen (June Ellis) - Diana Stewart's friend
- Walter Bowen (Emrys Jones) - husband of Thelma Bowen

== Episodes ==
No.	Title	Directed by	Written by	Original release date
1	"Episode 1"	Alan Bromly	Francis Durbridge	26 November 1966
2	"Episode 2"	Alan Bromly	Francis Durbridge	3 December 1966
3	"Episode 3"	Alan Bromly	Francis Durbridge	10 December 1966
4	"Episode 4"	Alan Bromly	Francis Durbridge	17 December 1966
5	"Episode 5"	Alan Bromly	Francis Durbridge	24 December 1966

== Reception ==
Bat Out of Hell was first broadcast on 26 November 1966. It aired Saturday nights at 10:05 pm and ran for five episodes with the series finale on 24 December 1966. The serial provided an interesting premise with the story taking place before the actual murder, a rarity in the genre at the time, so that the motives for Diana Stewart and Mark Paxton decision to murder Geoffrey Stewart could be better understood by the audience. The series climax, according to the John Thaw Foundation, is "particularly well remembered" in British television history.

A novelisation of a five-part serial, entitled Bat Out of Hell: An Inspector Clay Mystery, was written by Francis Durbridge and published in 1972. British crime novelist Martin Edwards, who enjoyed the series as a child, praised the book as "a little-known gem of suspense".
