= The Angel Who Pawned Her Harp =

1954 British film by Alan Bromly

- Directed by: Alan Bromly
- Written by: Sidney Cole; Charles Terrot
- Based on: The Angel Who Pawned Her Harp by Charles Terrot
- Produced by: Sidney Cole
- Starring: Felix Aylmer; Diane Cilento; Jerry Desmonde
- Cinematography: Arthur Grant
- Edited by: John Merritt
- Music by: Antony Hopkins
- Production company: Group 3 Films
- Distributed by: British Lion Film Corporation
- Release date: 9 September 1954 (London)
- Running time: 76 minutes
- Country: United Kingdom
- Language: English

The Angel Who Pawned Her Harp is a 1954 British fantasy comedy film directed by Alan Bromly and starring Felix Aylmer, Diane Cilento and Jerry Desmonde. The film was based on a novel by Charles Terrot and is a remake of his television play broadcast in 1951. It was remade as a West German film of the same title in 1959.

== Plot ==
A beautiful blonde angel arrives in Islington in London on a goodwill mission to soften the heart of pawnbroker Joshua Webman who specialises in old musical instruments. To raise money for her mission, she tries to pawn her harp to him. This is done through organising a "chance meeting" in the pub with a man. Webman eventually gives in and pays £300 for the harp but is disappointed when other experts tell him that it is only worth £15.

Bringing out the best in the people she meets, she shows them the path down which their happiness lies.

== Cast ==
- Felix Aylmer as pawnbroker Joshua Webman
- Diane Cilento as the Angel
- Jerry Desmonde as Parker
- Robert Eddison as the voice
- Joe Linnane as Ned Sullivan
- Phyllis Morris as Mrs. Trap
- Sheila Sweet as Jenny Lane
- Philip Guard as Len Burrows
- Genitha Halsey as Mrs. Burrows
- Edward Evans as Sergeant Lane
- Elaine Wodson as Mrs. Lane
- Thomas Gallagher as Boyd
- Alfie Bass as Lennox
- June Ellis as Sally
- Herbert C. Walton as Mr. Meek
- Freddie Watts as bookmaker
- Maurice Kaufmann as Reg
- David Kossoff as Schwartz
- Raymond Rollett as Stillvane
- Cyril Smith as dog owner
- Jean Aubrey as Sue
- Thomas Moore as small boy
- Nelson's Gift as Spiderflash

== Production ==
It was shot in black and white at Beaconsfield Studios with location shooting around Islington in London. The film's sets were designed by the art director Ray Simm.

== Critical reception ==
Leonard Maltin dismissed the film as "Slight, forgettable fare".

Monthly Film Bulletin said "It seems rather a pity that such a fragile and delicate piece of whimsy should receive so prosaic a treatment, for the element of unreality is not confined to the Heavenly Host, but pervades ‘he human denizens of the Angel as well. Played, with few exceptions, somewhat stolidly, the characters are for the most part all too deliberately and familiarly "quaint". Diane Cilento makes quite a fetching Angel, but whimsical fantasy calls for a lighter and more imaginative touch than is present here."

Kine Weekly said "Supernatural comedy drama tabulating the wild adventures and misadventures of an angel sent on a good-will mission to London’s less salubrious quarters. It contains wit, whimsy and conventional romance, but, although adequately acted and authentically staged, is a bit too airy-fairy for average halls. ... The picture never attempts to preach and neither does it strike an irreverent note, yet somehow or other the flight of fancy, sincere and unique as it is, frequently overshoots its mark. .... The film's main fault is excess footage. The angel would be far more entertaining if her wings were clipped."

Allmovie called it "disposable".

TV Guide described it as a "Well-made, charming British picture with the standard seriocomic blend of 1950s English films".

Sky Movies praised Diane Cilento, "charm itself as the Angel," and appreciated a "whimsical Ealing-style comedy which keeps its feet firmly on the ground, spreading chuckles instead of sentiment and providing polished frolics in the process. Felix Aylmer – brilliant as the hard-bitten pawnbroker – Jerry Desmonde, Alfie Bass and a first-rate supporting cast help to put a high gloss on these heavenly capers".

In British Sound Films: The Studio Years 1928–1959 David Quinlan rated the film as "average", writing: "Minor whimsy, a bit plodding but quite acceptable."

== See also ==
- List of films about angels
