= June Ellis =

English actress (1926–2011)

- June Ellis in Frenzy 1972
- Born: June Georgina Ellis; 3 June 1926; Dover, Kent, England
- Died: 26 June 2011 (aged 85); London, England
- Occupation: Actress
- Years active: 1954–1996
- Spouse: Alan Bromly (m. 1948; died 1995)

June Georgina Ellis Bromly (3 June 1926 – 26 June 2011) was an English film and television actress. She was married to director Alan Bromly.

== Filmography ==
=== Film roles ===
- The Angel Who Pawned Her Harp (1954) – Sally
- Sky West and Crooked (1965) – Mrs. Cheeseman
- Bat Out of Hell (TV series) (1966) – Thelma Bowen (Five episodes)
- Quatermass and the Pit (1967) – Blonde
- Ring of Bright Water (1969) – Barmaid
- Anne of the Thousand Days (1969) – Bess
- Frenzy (1972) – Maisie – Barmaid (uncredited)
- Yanks (1979) – Mrs. Shenton
- Hot Moves (1985) – Old Lady in Park
- The Girl in a Swing (1988) – Lady at Auction
- Getting It Right (1989) – Mrs. Wagstaffe
- Younger and Younger (1993) – Auntie E

=== Television roles ===
- The Prisoner (1967) – Number Forty-eight (A Change of Mind)
- Paul Temple (1969–1970) – Kate Balfour
- Porridge (1974) – Isobel Fletcher
- Poldark (1977) – Lady Whitworth
- All Creatures Great and Small (1978–1989) – Mrs. Mason / Mrs. Bellerby
- Fawlty Towers (1979) – Mrs. Johnston
