= Alan Bromly =

British television producer and director (1915–1995)

- Born: Alan James Bromly; 13 September 1915; Godalming, Surrey, England
- Died: 30 August 1995 (aged 79); Hounslow, Middlesex, England
- Occupations: Director, producer, actor
- Years active: 1930s–1983 (film & TV)
- Spouse: June Ellis (m. 1948)

Alan James Bromly (13 September 1915 – 30 August 1995) was a British television director, producer and actor. He was married to the actress June Ellis.

== Early life ==
Born in Godalming, Surrey on 13 September 1915, he was the son of a surveyor (also named Alan Bromly), Bromly began his education at Windsor House School in Slough. He then went to Dean Close School in Cheltenham (where his father was educated before him) and was taught Shakespeare by Professor Wilson Knight. On a visit from Toronto to England to stage a production of Hamlet on the London stage, Knight invited Bromly to take part, him being the only amateur in the whole cast. Encouraged by Knight, who was impressed and confident with his talents, Bromly decided to embark on a stage career, winning a scholarship to the Royal Academy of Dramatic Art, graduating in 1938.

== Career ==
Soon, he was appearing in theatres in Tonbridge, Croydon, Cromer, Brighton and Bangor with preference for comedy roles. By the early 1950s, he had established himself as a producer-director and worked on many productions including directing two feature films, The Angel Who Pawned Her Harp and Follow That Horse! and producing anthology series Out of the Unknown for the BBC, eventually going freelance to direct for commercial television.

== Doctor Who ==
In 1973, Bromly was asked to direct The Time Warrior for Doctor Who. The serial required an experienced director and his name was suggested to producer Barry Letts. Being old-fashioned, Bromly's working methods could be seen by some as inflexible and antiquated. Newcomer Elisabeth Sladen found it difficult to connect with him while Kevin Lindsay disagreed with him on the pronunciation of "Sontaran". When it was realised that adding a white glow of a ship rising from the castle was too awkward to achieve as a superimposed shot in studio, Bromly instead opted to cut directly from a shot of Peckforton Castle to two feet of silent stock 16mm film of quarry blasting, thus achieving the effect. This disappointed Letts who had hoped for a model shot. The director afterwards left many post-production elements to his production assistant to supervise.

Six years later, Bromly was hired to director Nightmare of Eden. Hoping that the set-up would have improved after this time, he found the scripts to be daunting and effects-intensive. Having prepared his camera scripts to record the serial almost totally in sequence, he ended up reworking the schedule on a set-by-set basis, planning his recording breaks to set up visual effects. According to other production members, Bromly simply didn't understand how to direct the programme efficiently — and wasn't interested in learning. What's more, friction developed between Bromly and Tom Baker, the director not agreeing with the actor's ad-libs. Tensions mounted with Baker becoming impatient at the filming schedule and at times ignoring the director's instructions. Other cast members also ignored him after he talked to them on set in a manner which gave them no creative latitude as performers. It all led to a heated row between Bromly and Baker with producer Graham Williams mediating. Eventually, Bromly departed from the production finding the punishing schedule and cast's criticisms unbearable. Williams stepped into the director's chair to complete the serial although Bromly would receive sole credit on all four episodes.

Afterwards, Bromly would go on to direct episodes of soap operas in the 1980s, retiring in 1983.

== Death ==
He died in Hounslow on 30 August 1995 aged 79 and was cremated a week later.

== Selected filmography ==
- The Angel Who Pawned Her Harp (1954, film)
- Portrait of Alison (1955, TV series)
- Follow That Horse! (1960, film)
- Z-Cars (1963, TV series)
- Melissa (1964, TV series)
- An Enemy of the State (1965, TV series)
- Bat Out of Hell (1966, TV series)
- Take a Pair of Private Eyes (1966, TV series)
- Witch Hunt (1967, TV series)
- Paul Temple (1969, TV series)
- Out of the Unknown (1969-1971, TV series)
- Crown Court (1972-1977, TV series)
- Justice (1973, TV series)
- Emmerdale (1973, TV series)
- Swiss Family Robinson (1974-1976, TV series)
- Coronation Street (1977-1980, TV series)
- Crossroads (1977-1983)

== Bibliography ==
- Von Gunden, Kenneth. Flights of Fancy: The Great Fantasy Films. McFarland, 2001.
- Wheatley, Helen. Gothic Television. Manchester University Press, 2006.
