= Portrait from Life =

1948 British film by Terence Fisher

- British quad poster (1950s re-release)
- Directed by: Terence Fisher
- Written by: Muriel Box; Sydney Box; Frank Harvey
- Story by: David Evans
- Produced by: Antony Darnborough
- Starring: Mai Zetterling; Robert Beatty; Guy Rolfe; Herbert Lom; Patrick Holt
- Cinematography: Jack Asher
- Edited by: Vladimir Sagovsky
- Music by: Benjamin Frankel
- Production company: Gainsborough Pictures
- Distributed by: General Film Distributors
- Release date: 15 December 1948 (London)
- Running time: 90 minutes
- Country: United Kingdom
- Language: English
- Budget: £132,800
- Box office: £150,000 (by 1953) or £136,900; 245,405 admissions (France)

Portrait from Life (also known as Lost Daughter and Journey into Yesterday; U.S. title: The Girl in the Painting) is a 1948 British drama film directed by Terence Fisher and starring Mai Zetterling, Robert Beatty and Guy Rolfe.

== Plot ==
A British Army officer, Major Lawrence, is on leave from being stationed in occupied Germany just after WW2 when he sees a painting of a beautiful young girl called Hildegard in a London art gallery. While viewing the painting he is approached by an old man, Professor Franz Menzel, who escaped from Nazi Germany in the 1930s leaving his family behind and claims to be the young girl's father. Major Lawrence agrees to search for the young girl when he returns to Germany. On returning to Germany and after a long search Major Lawrence eventually tracks down the young girl but she is suffering from amnesia and living with a German couple who claim to be her parents. As Lawrence investigates, the circumstances of the young girl's past become more complicated.

== Main cast ==
- Mai Zetterling as Hildegard / Lidia
- Robert Beatty as Campbell Reid
- Guy Rolfe as Major Lawrence
- Herbert Lom as Fritz Kottler Hendlemann
- Patrick Holt as Ferguson
- Arnold Marlé as Professor Franz Menzel
- Sybille Binder as Eitel Hendlemann
- Thora Hird as Mrs. Skinner
- Gerard Heinz as Heine
- Yvonne Owen as Helen
- Philo Hauser as Hans Ackermann
- Pete Murray as Lieutenant Keith
- Gordon Bell as Captain Roberts
- Nelly Arno as Anna Skutetsky
- Cyril Chamberlain as Supervisor
- Betty Lynne as Interpreter
- Anthony Steel as Bridegroom
- John Blythe as Club Manager

== Production ==
Anthony Steel has one of his earliest film appearances.

== Reception ==
=== Critical ===
The Monthly Film Bulletin wrote: "The superb acting of Mai Zetterling really makes this film; she acts with emotion and feeling, and lives the part ...The other four main characters are also very competent. Although the story is fantastic in places, it is interesting and contains little humorous touches, and realistic glimpses of camp life to display the effects of good direction and production. The lighting, camerawork and musical illustrations are all good drama, thrills and suspense, together with sufficient relief."

The New York Times wrote, "the new picture at the Little Carnegie stems from an intriguing idea, and there are several very effective sequences in the drama, plus a fine performance by the Swedish actress, Mai Zetterling. Indeed, if the whole of The Girl in the Painting were as good as its parts, the posting of this notice would be a much more pleasant task. Too much, rather than too little, story and plodding direction are the principal faults."

Allmovie described it as "an over-orchestrated 'guilty pleasure' from the glory days of British romance pictures."

=== Box office ===
Producer's receipts were £93,000 in the UK and £43,900 overseas. According to Rank's records the film had made a profit of £4,100 for the company by December 1949.
