= Tim Frazer and the Mysterious Mister X =

1964 film

- Directed by: Ernst Hofbauer
- Written by: Ernst Hofbauer; Anton Van Casteren
- Based on: The World of Tim Frazer by Francis Durbridge
- Produced by: Josef Eckert
- Starring: Adrian Hoven; Corny Collins; Paul Löwinger
- Cinematography: Raymond Herold
- Edited by: Arnfried Heyne
- Music by: Heinz Neubrand
- Production company: Melba Film
- Distributed by: Constantin Film
- Release date: 12 June 1964
- Running time: 87 minutes
- Countries: Austria; Belgium
- Language: German

Tim Frazer and the Mysterious Mister X (German: Tim Frazer jagt den geheimnisvollen Mister X) is a 1964 Austrian-Belgian crime thriller film directed by Ernst Hofbauer and starring Adrian Hoven, Corny Collins and Paul Löwinger. It was shot partly in studios in Brussels and on location in Antwerp. The film's sets were designed by the art director Hans Zehetner. It is inspired by the British television series The World of Tim Frazer by Francis Durbridge, although the protagonist is shifted from a British structural engineer to a private detective.

== Synopsis ==
British detective Tim Frazer heads to Antwerp to investigate the murderer targeting members of a smuggling gang. With the help of his fiancée Janine, who goes undercover in a bar, Frazer eventually unmasks the mysterious criminal leader "Mister X" following a dramatic pursuit through the city's harbour.

== Cast ==
- Adrian Hoven as Tim Frazer
- Corny Collins as Janine
- Paul Löwinger as Inspektor Stoffels
- Mady Rahl as Rosalie
- Ady Berber as Lode Van Dijk
- Sieghardt Rupp as Jack van Druten
- Hector Camerlynck as Jeroom
- Marcel Hendrickx as Konsul Anatolië
- Jean Balthasar as Mister X
- Ellen Schwiers as Farida
- Herbert Fux as Man with sunglasses

== Bibliography ==
- Von Dassanowsky, Robert. Austrian Cinema. McFarland & Co, 2005.
