= Wozzeck (film) =

1947 film

- Directed by: Georg C. Klaren
- Written by: Georg Büchner (play Woyzeck); Georg C. Klaren
- Starring: Kurt Meisel; Helga Zülch; Max Eckard
- Cinematography: Bruno Mondi
- Edited by: Lena Neumann
- Music by: Herbert Trantow
- Production company: DEFA
- Distributed by: Sovexport
- Release date: 17 December 1947
- Running time: 98 minutes
- Country: Germany
- Language: German

Wozzeck is a 1947 German drama film directed by Georg C. Klaren and starring Kurt Meisel, Max Eckard, and Helga Zülch. It is based on the play Woyzeck by Georg Büchner. (The play, which was first performed in 1913, nearly 80 years after Büchner's death, had been originally billed as Wozzeck due to a misreading of Büchner's handwriting.)

The film's sets were designed by Bruno Monden and Hermann Warm. It was shot at Babelsberg and the Althoff Studios in Potsdam.

== Plot ==
Everything in town appears calm, placid, lovely. But Woyzeck, a rifleman assigned as an orderly, hears voices—the times are out of joint, at least in his cosmos. To his captain, Woyzeck is a comic marvel: ignorant but courageous and full of energy.

== Main cast ==
- Kurt Meisel as Wozzeck
- Helga Zülch as Marie
- Paul Henckels as Arzt
- Arno Paulsen as Hauptmann
- Richard Häussler as Tambour-Major
- Max Eckard as Georg Büchner
- Willi Rose as Andres
- Claire Reigbert as Margret
- Alfred Balthoff as Handwerksbursche
- Wolfgang Kühne as Ausrufer
- Otto Matthies as Handwerksbursche
- Karl Hellmer as Trödler
- Elsa Wagner as Großmutter
- Rotraut Richter as Käthe
- Max Drahn as Idiot
- Erich Lothar as Bub Christian
- Leo Sloma as Wirt
- Valy Arnheim as Gerichtspräsident

== Bibliography ==
- Bock, Hans-Michael; Bergfelder, Tim, eds. (2009). The Concise Cinegraph: Encyclopaedia of German Cinema. New York: Berghahn Books. ISBN 978-1-57181-655-9.
