= Life in Her Hands =

1951 film by Philip Leacock

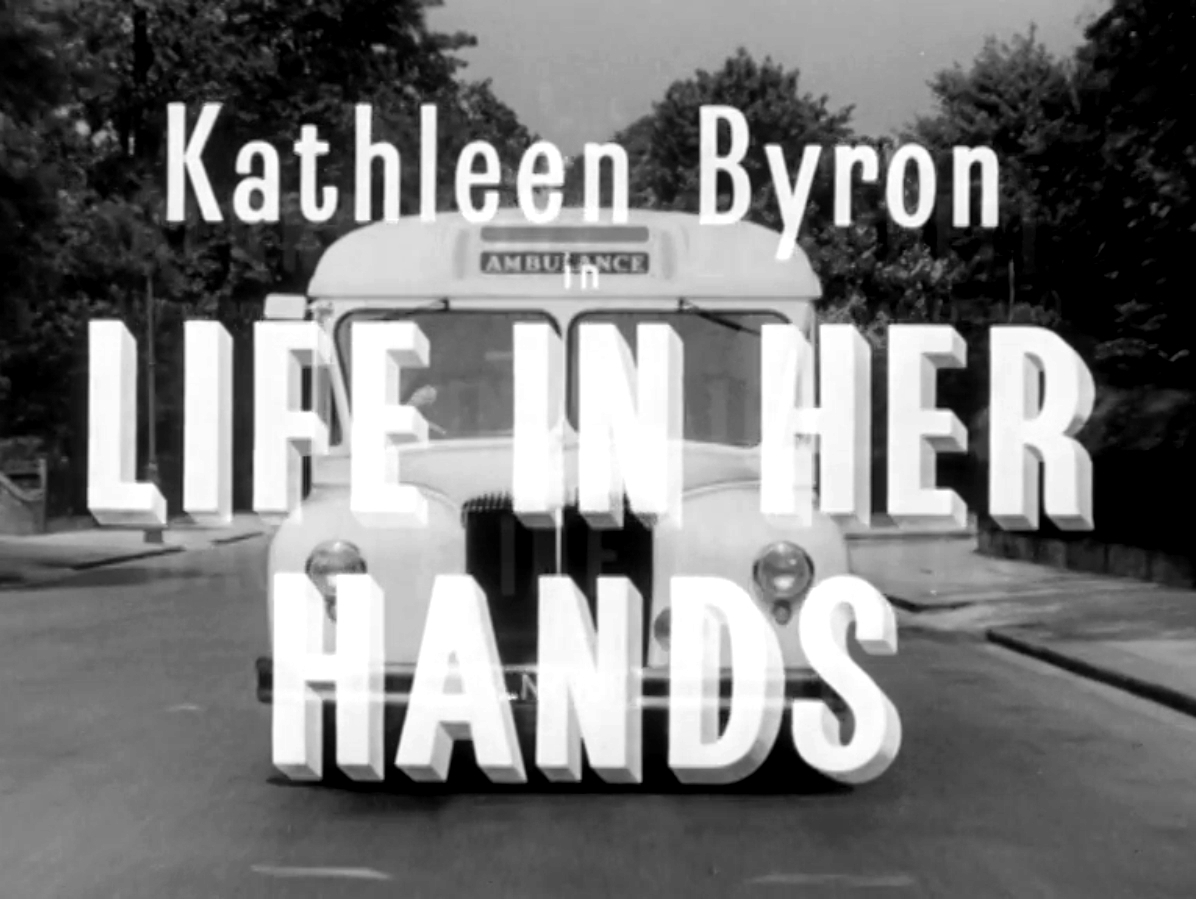
- Directed by: Philip Leacock
- Written by: Monica Dickens; Anthony Steven
- Produced by: Frederick Wilson
- Starring: Kathleen Byron; Bernadette O'Farrell; Jenny Laird
- Cinematography: Fred Gamage
- Edited by: Jocelyn Jackson
- Music by: Clifton Parker
- Production company: Crown Film Unit
- Distributed by: United Artists
- Release date: June 1951
- Running time: 57 minutes
- Country: United Kingdom
- Language: English

Life in Her Hands is a 1951 drama film sponsored by the British Ministry of Labour with the aim of recruiting women to the nursing profession. It was produced in response to addressing the short supply of qualified nurses in Britain after the Second World War, caused to some degree by the needs of the newly founded National Health Service (NHS). It was produced by the Crown Film Unit and distributed widely across all major cinemas by United Artists. The film was written by Anthony Steven and Monica Dickens, and directed by Philip Leacock. The cast included Bernadette O'Farrell, Jenny Laird, Jean Anderson and Kathleen Byron.

Byron, well known at the time for her role in the 1947 film Black Narcissus, plays the protagonist Anne Peters, who wrongly believes herself to be responsible for the death of her husband in a car crash. She subsequently decides to become a nurse to assuage her guilt. In addition to the fictional content, the film conveys a picture of life in British hospitals, the difficulties and compensations of nursing work and related attitudes and practices of the day, such as the rigid nursing hierarchy and gender roles.

== Background ==
Life in Her Hands was sponsored by the Ministry of Labour as part of a national campaign to increase the recruitment of nurses following the Second World War. An existing shortage was worsened by the creation of Britain's National Health Service. Recruitment subsequently extended overseas. The film was produced by the Crown Film Unit and was distributed across all major cinemas by United Artists. It was released as a second feature and received a certificate A. Although fictional, it was advertised as a documentary and contained reconstructions of hospital life.

Documents at the National Archives reveal that Irish writer Frank O’Connor together with a retired senior matron and the editor of the Nursing Times were called in to advise on production of the film.

== Synopsis ==
The protagonist Anne Peters is played by Kathleen Byron, who had become well known for her role as Sister Ruth in the 1947 film Black Narcissus. In Life in Her Hands, her character becomes a nurse to assuage her guilt after her husband dies in a car accident in which she was driving and for which she blames herself. The story of her guilt and how she comes to terms with it forms the fictional content of the film. She takes up the profession at an older age than normal and despite warnings from her middle-class family about the intensive training that will be required. Byron plays Peters as vulnerable but resilient, with intense emotions that are accentuated by a combination of music and close-up shots.

Through a series of vignettes, the day-to-day life of a nurse in a British hospital in the immediate post-war years is revealed, showing the strict hierarchy of nursing roles, lingering shortages, difficulties in dealing with boisterous male working-class patients, and gender divisions. The film also devoted significant amounts of time to the benefits of nursing in accordance with its purpose of promoting the profession as an attractive career option for women.

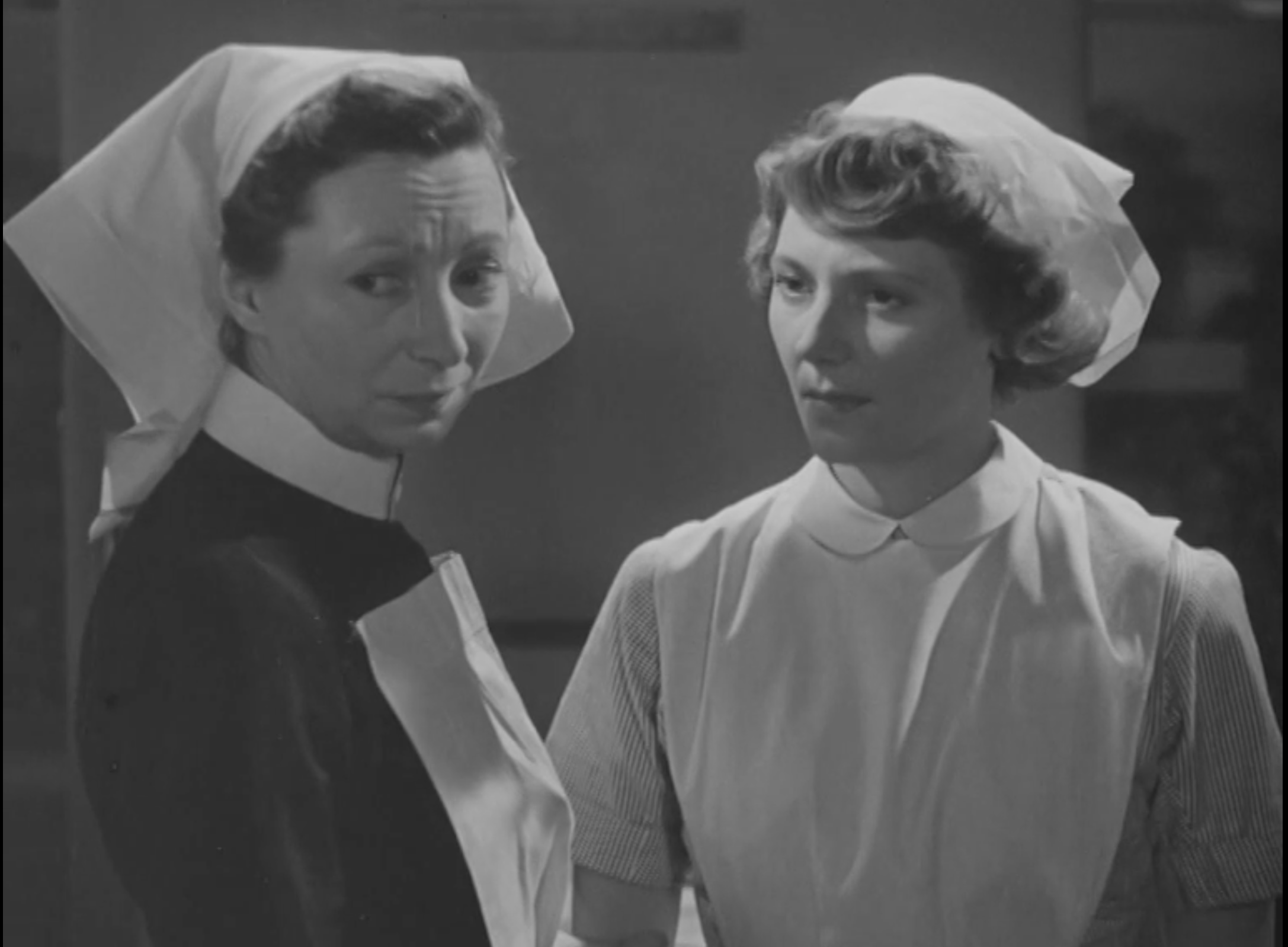
With night sister

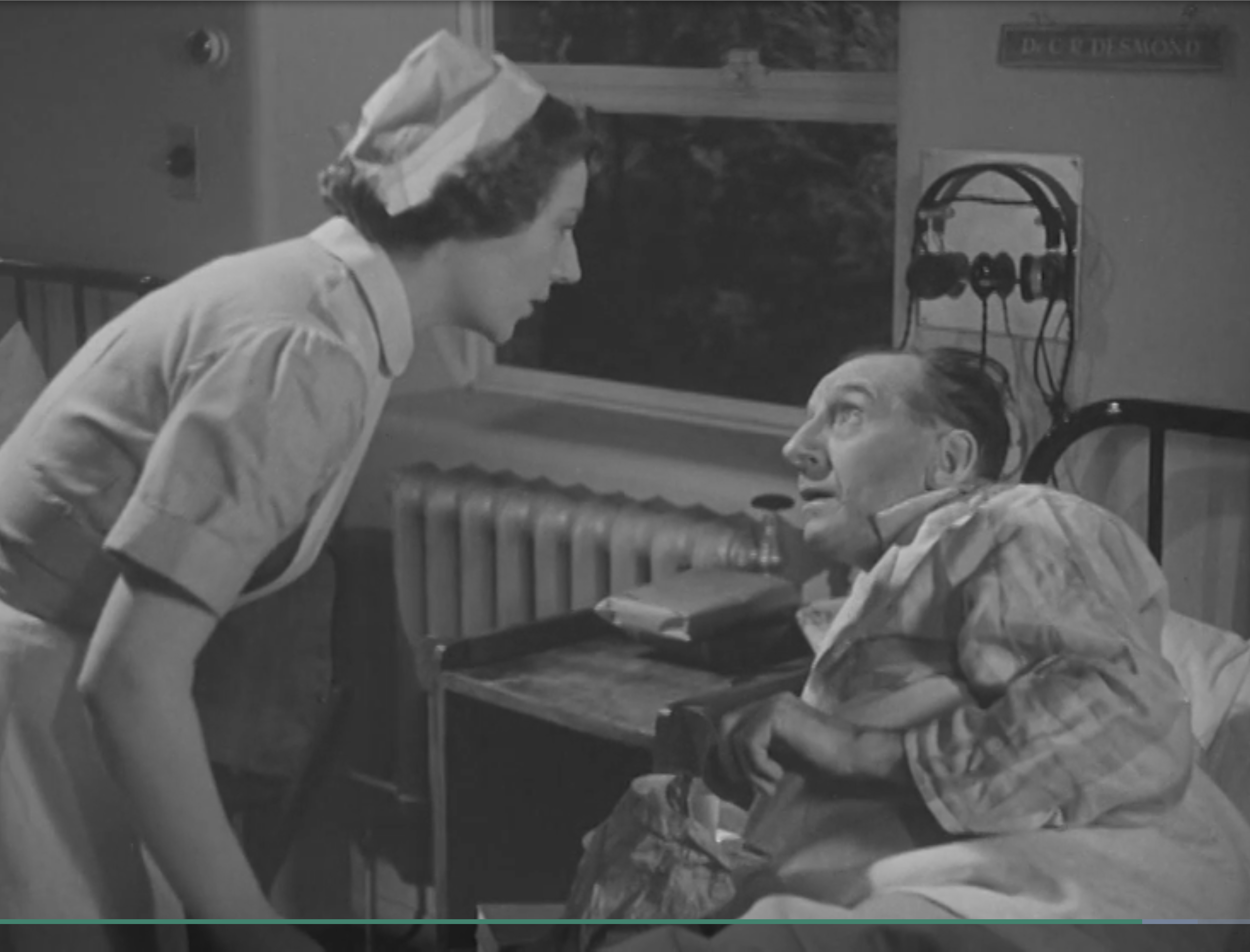
With male patient

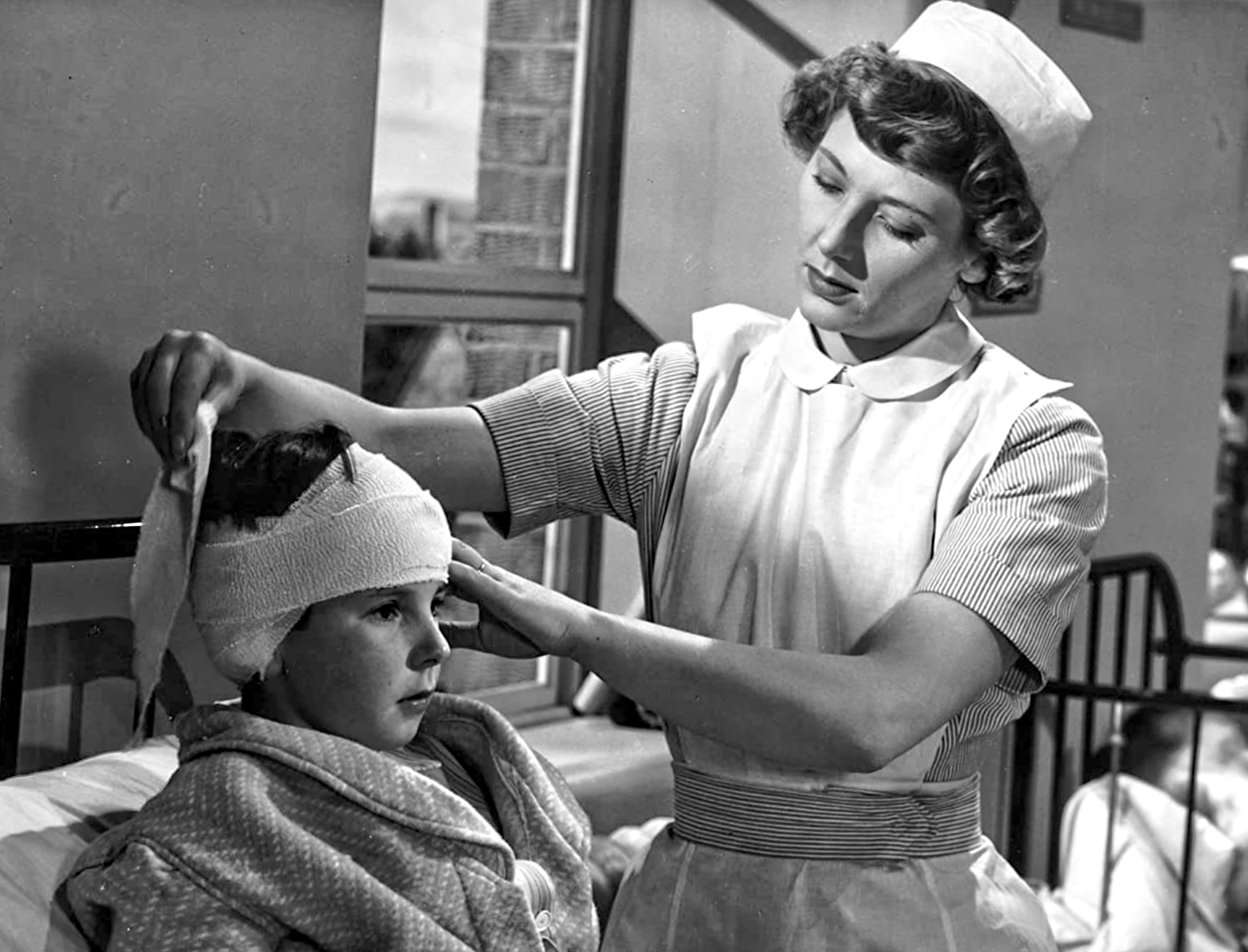
Nursing work

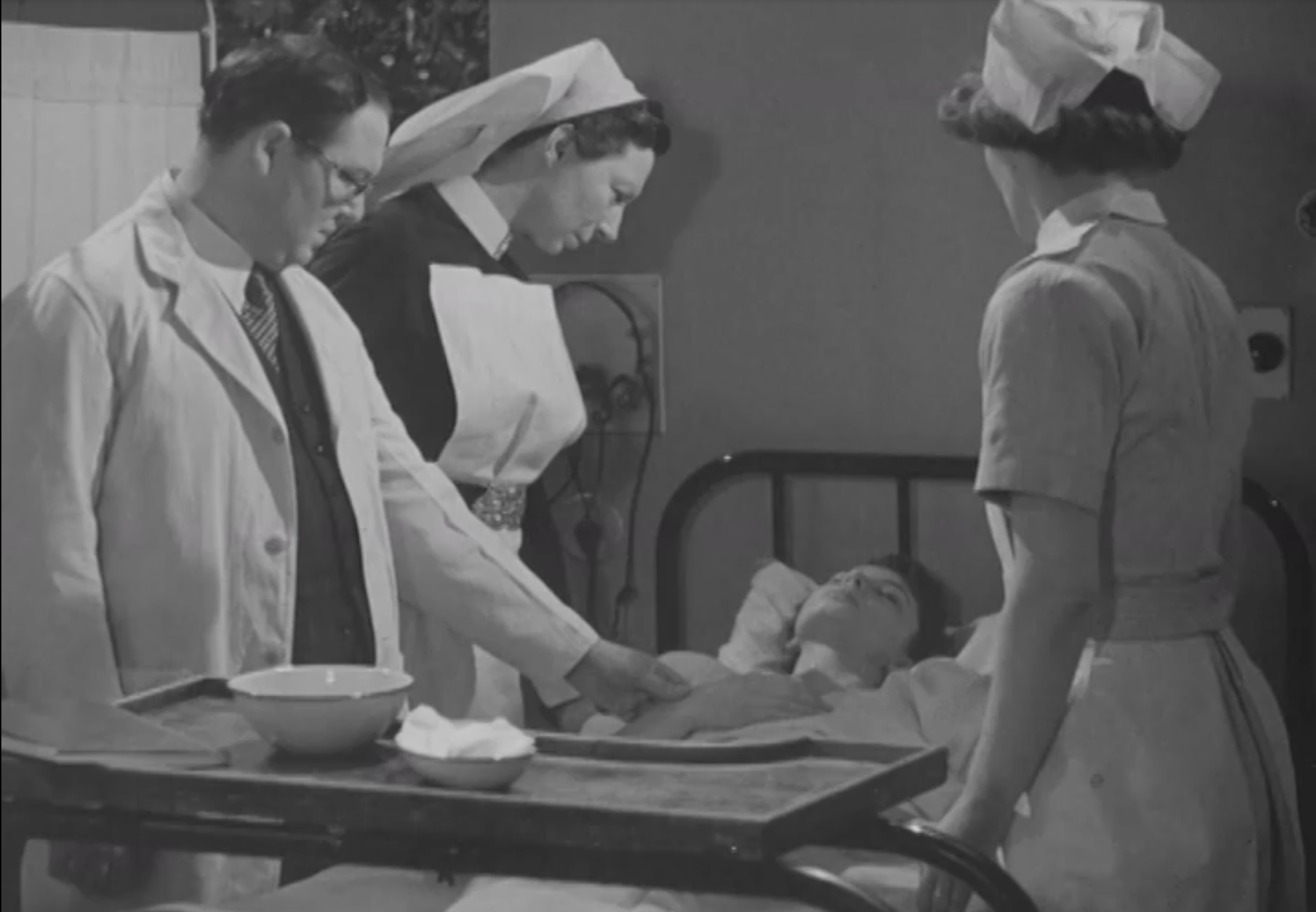
With doctor, sister and patient

== Production ==
Life in Her Hands was directed by Philip Leacock. Anthony Steven and Monica Dickens, the great-granddaughter of Charles Dickens, wrote the script; she had published in 1942 One Pair of Feet about her war service as a nurse. The film was scored by Clifton Parker. Kathleen Byron was cast as the protagonist and other actors included Bernadette O'Farrell and Jenny Laird.

The cast includes:

- Kathleen Byron as nurse Ann Peters.
- Bernadette O'Farrell as nurse Mary Gordon.
- Jacqueline Charles as nurse Michele Rennie.
- Jenny Laird as Matron.
- Robert Long as Jack Wilson.
- Grace Gavin as Sister McTavish.
- Jean Anderson as Night Sister.
- Joan Maude as Sister Tutor.
- Elwyn Brook-Jones as Surgeon.
- Iris Ballard as Nurse Soper.
- Grace Arnold as Children's Sister.
- Susan Richmond as Mrs. Wilson.
- Audrey Teasdale as Aggie Arthurs.
- Michael Ward as Ralph.
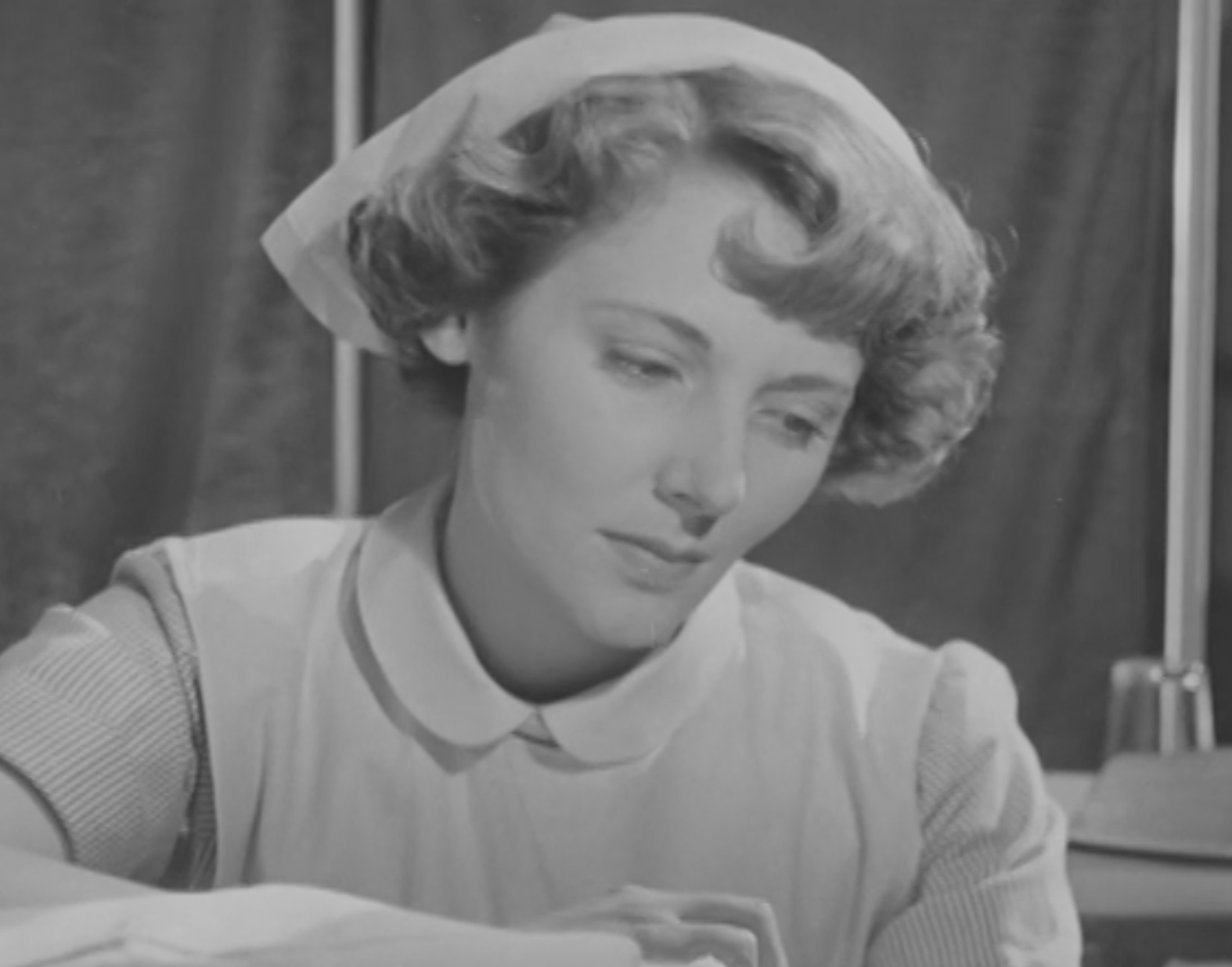
Kathleen Byron

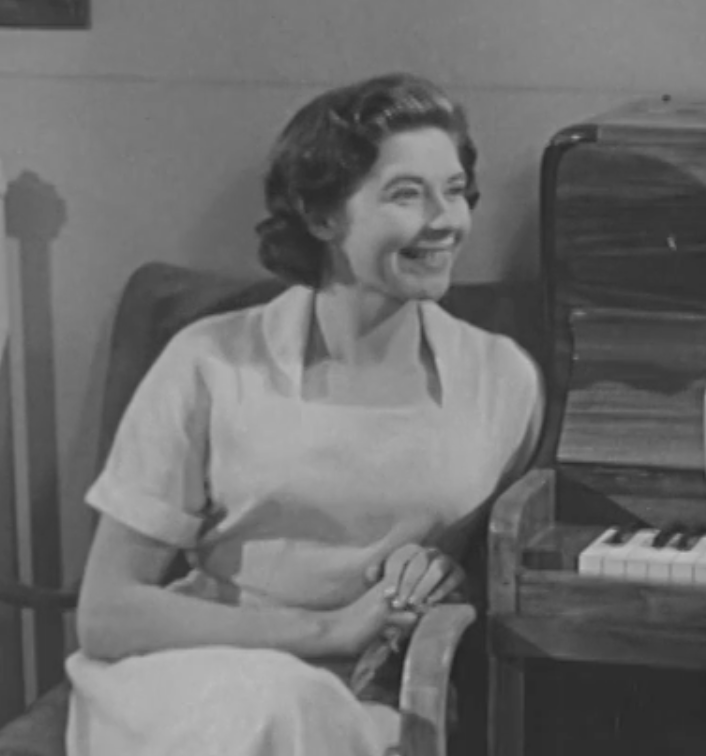
Bernadette O'Farrell

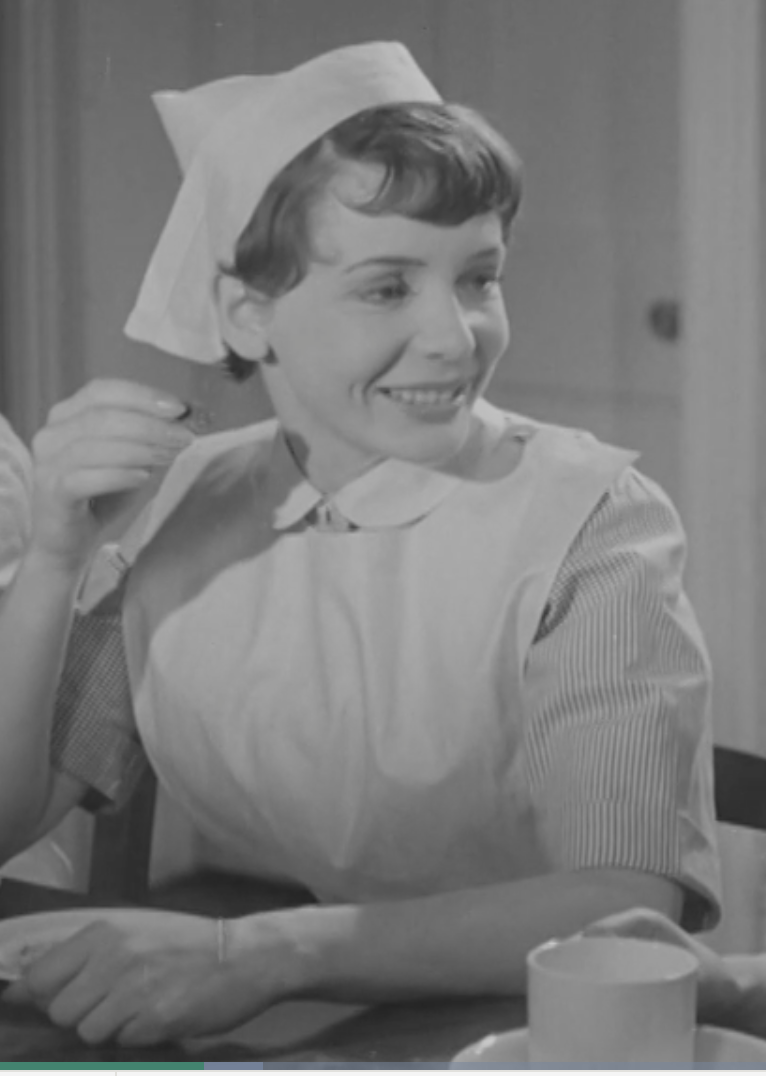
Jacqueline Charles

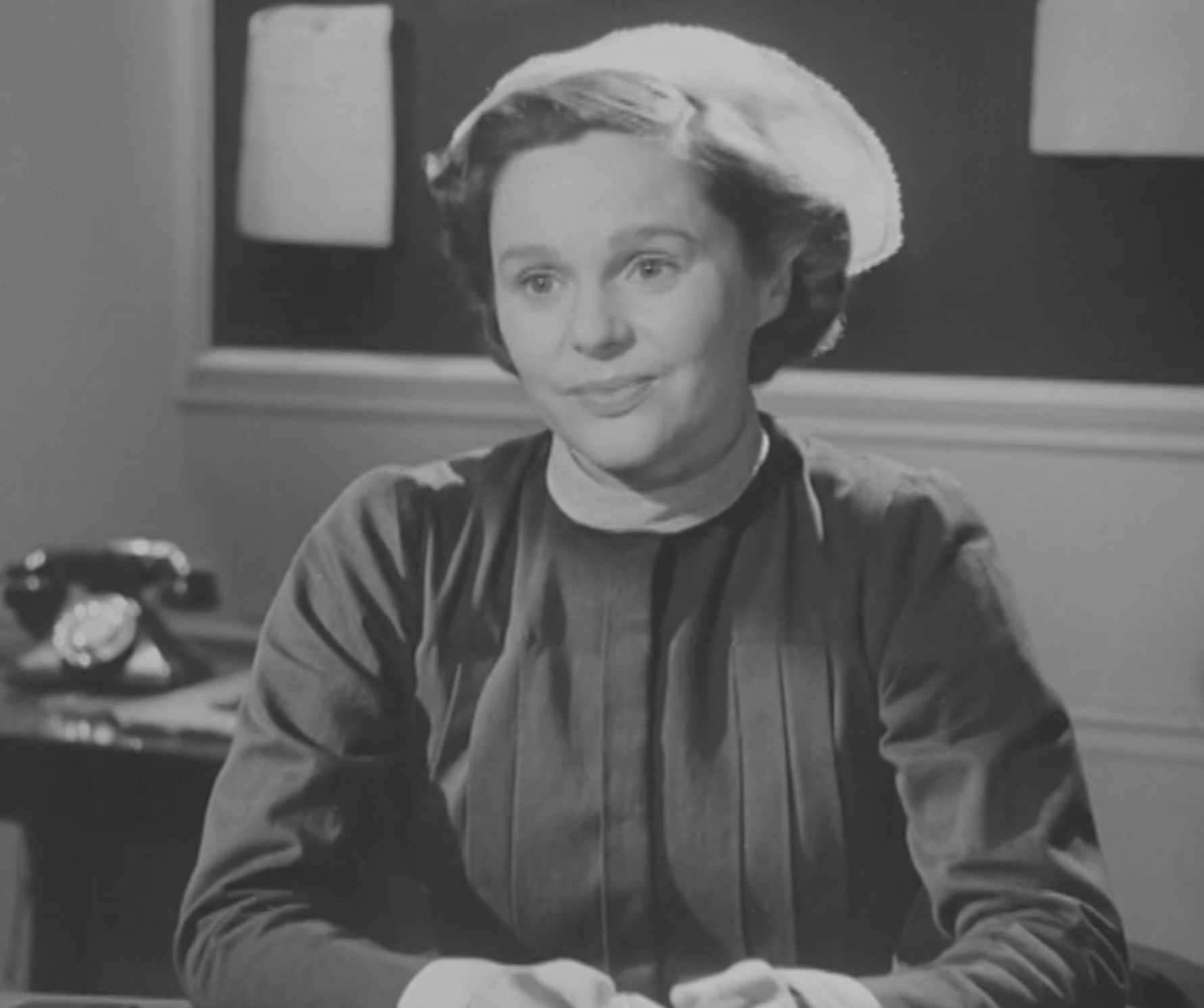
Jenny Laird

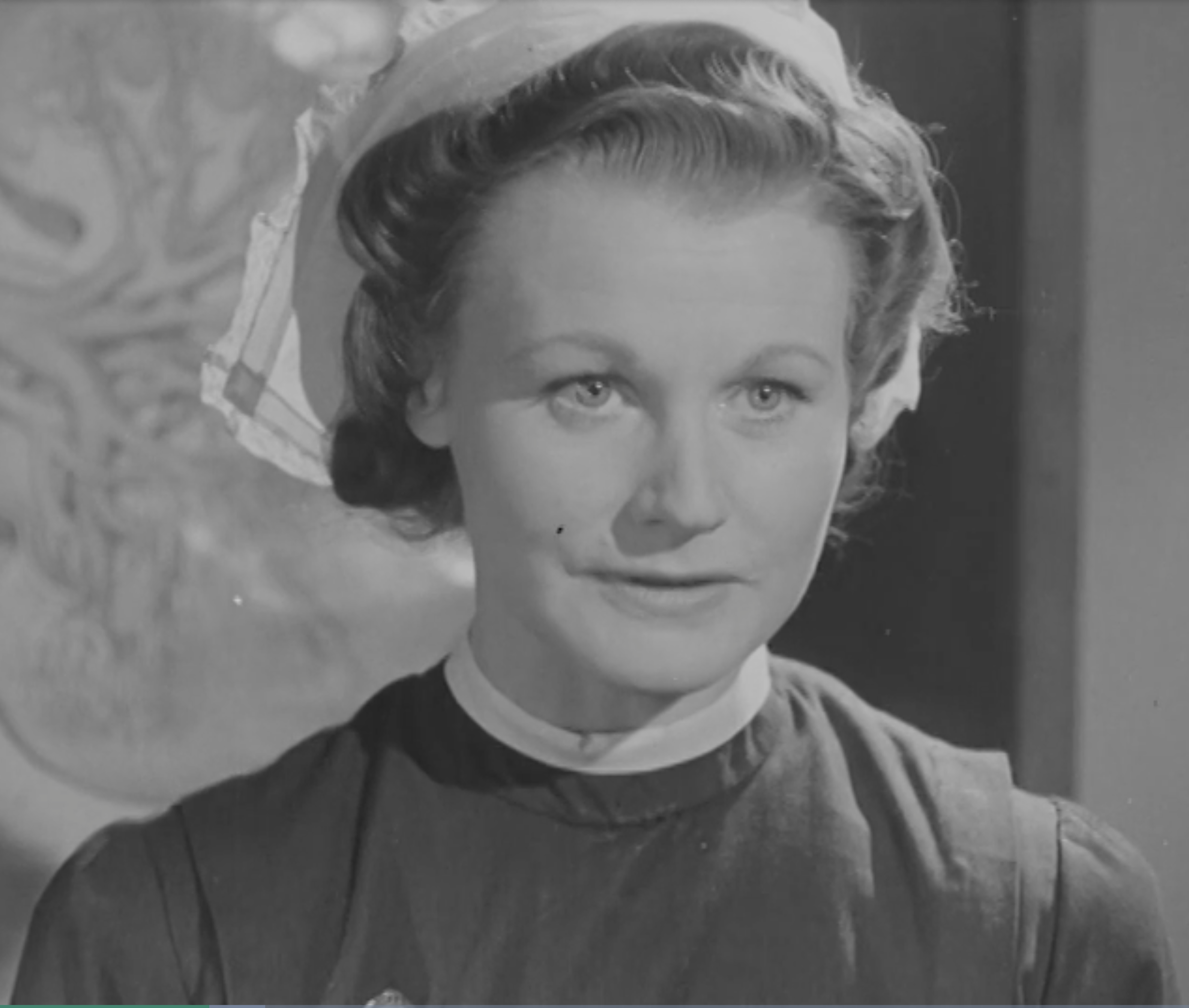
Joan Maude

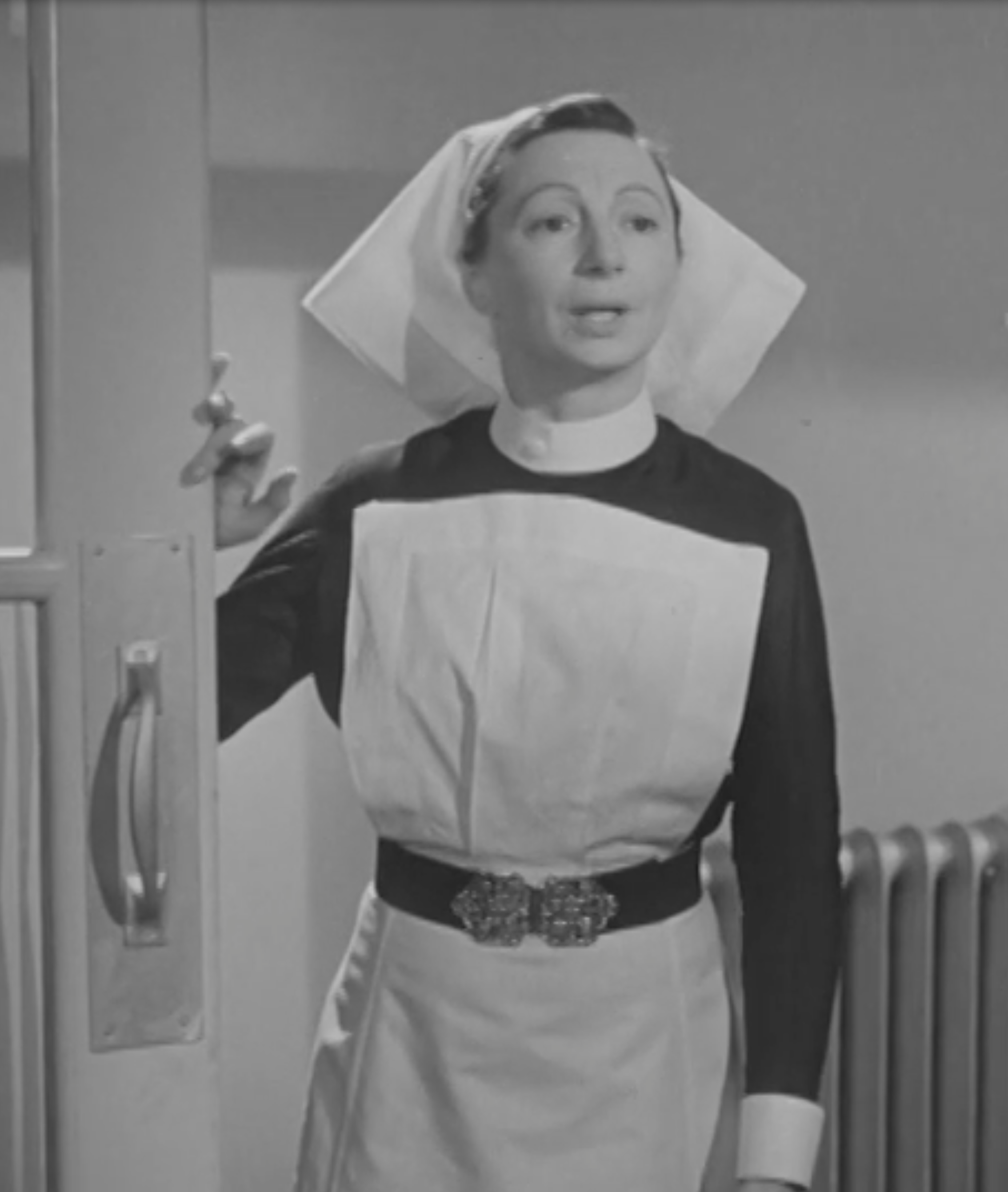
Jean Anderson

== Reception and legacy ==
The Monthly Film Bulletin reported the film as "combining impersonal information with a personal fictional story". A sister at the Liverpool Royal Infirmary felt that Hollywood films about Edith Cavell and Florence Nightingale had greater impact than a film like Life in Her Hands.

The British Film Institute has noted the expense and trouble taken in making the film despite it not being released as a main feature. It was one of the last films made by the Crown Film Unit which was closed the following year to save money, later British government-sponsored films being commissioned from private studios. The film was shown again in 2018 at the BFI Southbank to celebrate the seventieth anniversary of the National Health Service.

== Bibliography ==
- Chibnall, Steve & McFarlane, Brian. The British 'B' Film. Palgrave MacMillan, 2009.
