= Francis Durbridge =

English dramatist and author (1912–1998)

- Durbridge in April 1967
- Born: 25 November 1912; Hull, East Riding of Yorkshire, England
- Died: 11 April 1998 (aged 85); Barnes, London, England
- Education: University of Birmingham
- Occupations: Radio and television scriptwriter, playwright, author
- Years active: 1933-1998

Francis Henry Durbridge (25 November 1912 – 10 April 1998) was an English dramatist and author, best known for the creation of the character Paul Temple, the gentlemanly detective who appeared in 16 BBC multi-part radio serials from 1938 onward.

== Biography ==
Durbridge was born in Hull, East Riding of Yorkshire, and educated at Bradford Grammar School, where he was encouraged to write by his English teacher. He continued to do so while studying English at the University of Birmingham. After graduating in 1933, he worked for a short time as a stockbroker's clerk before selling a radio play, Promotion, to the BBC at the age of 21.

Durbridge created the character of Paul Temple, a crime novelist and detective, in the 1930s. With Louise "Steve" Trent, a Fleet Street journalist who would later become his wife, Temple solved numerous crimes in the glamorous world of the leisured middle classes, at first on radio. In addition to the Paul Temple series, Durbridge wrote other mysteries for radio and television, many of which were also produced for Dutch, German and Italian television and radio.

Durbridge also forged a successful career as a writer for the stage with seven plays, the last of which, Sweet Revenge, was written in 1991. He also wrote 43 novels, many of which were adapted from his scripts, sometimes with the help of others.

== Work for radio ==
=== Paul Temple in the United Kingdom ===
Durbridge wrote 20 Paul Temple serials for radio. The first was Send for Paul Temple, broadcast in eight episodes on the BBC Midland Regional Programme from 8 April 1938. Hugh Morton played Paul, and Steve was played by Bernadette Hodgson. Carl Bernard took over the part of Paul in 1939. Peter Coke took over the part from the 1954 serial, Paul Temple and the Gilbert Case, onwards.

Marjorie Westbury took over the part of Steve from the fifth serial, Send for Paul Temple Again (1945). She remained as Steve for the rest of the radio run. To many people, Coke and Westbury are most firmly identified with Paul and Steve.

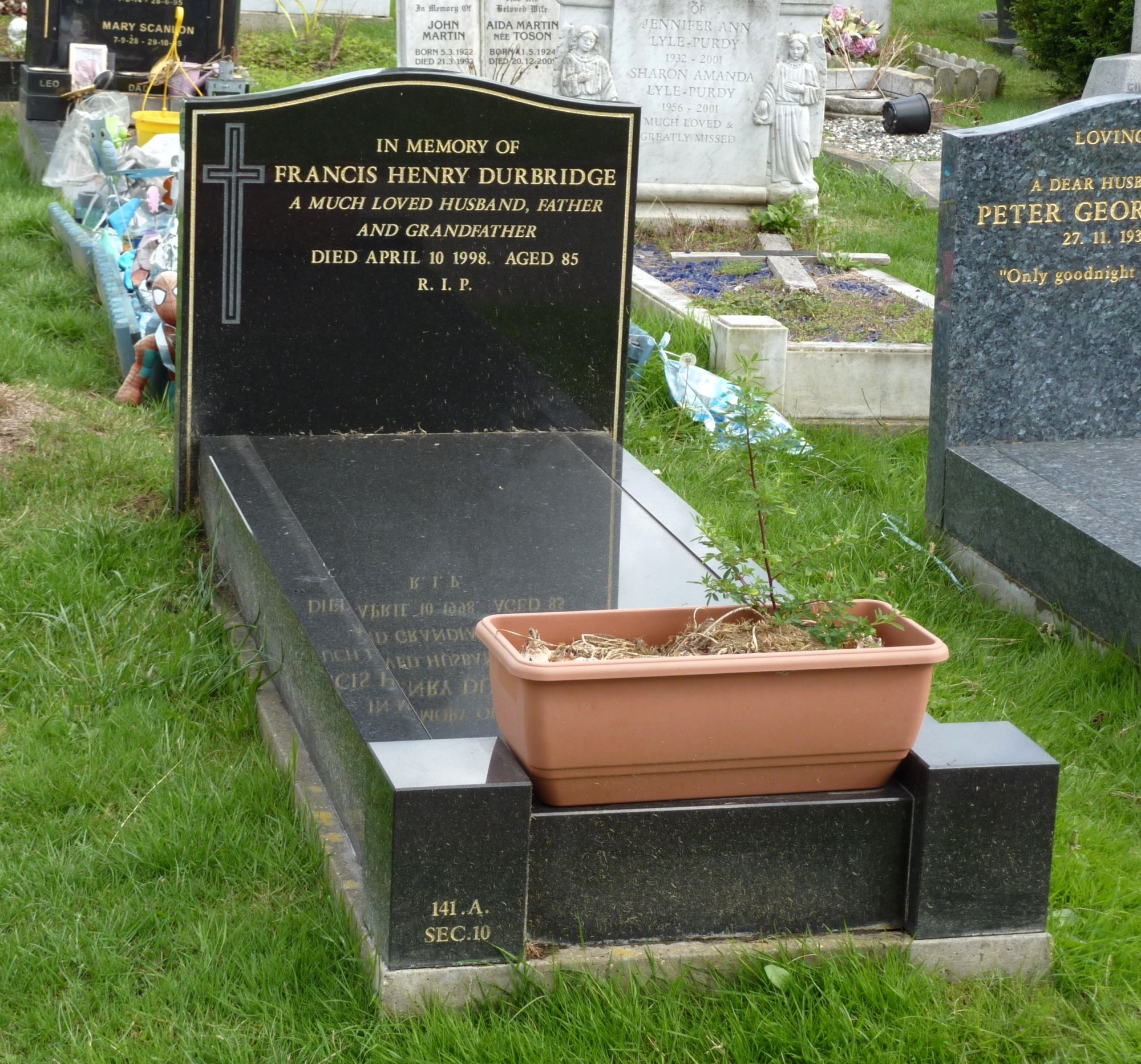
Durbridge's grave at Putney Vale Cemetery, London, in 2015

The original signature tune was taken from Scheherazade by Rimsky-Korsakov, with incidental music taken from the works of other composers, including Tintagel by Sir Arnold Bax. The signature tune was later changed to Coronation Scot by Vivian Ellis. The BBC licensed the serials to broadcasters in Commonwealth countries, where they were transmitted long after their original runs in the UK.

=== Paul Temple in Germany ===
In the 1960s, German radio adapted twelve Paul Temple serials. Like the BBC originals, each part ended with a cliffhanger, making them Strassenfeger ("street-clearers"), which were so popular as to leave the streets deserted. The actors were of national renown, with Paul Temple played by Luxembourg-born René Deltgen, and supported by Gustav Knuth, Paul Klinger and others. All of these German radio serials are, like the BBC originals, available on CD.

The European Broadcasting Union invited Durbridge in 1967 to write an original radio serial for the international market, La Boutique. This was broadcast in more than 15 countries.

== Work for television ==
Between 1952 and 1980, Durbridge wrote 17 TV serials for the BBC. Until 1959, they were shown under the umbrella title A Francis Durbridge Serial, which was then changed to Francis Durbridge Presents. Versions were also made in the Netherlands, Italy, France and Germany; some serials were re-made in the 1980s and 1990s.

The Scarf was a six-part serial starring Stephen Murray and Donald Pleasence, and was aired by the BBC in February and March 1959. The theme music was The Girl from Corsica by Trevor Duncan. There were objections in Germany in 1962 when comedian Wolfgang Neuss revealed in a newspaper who would turn out to be the murderer in the last episode of a German version called Das Halstuch.

In 1960–61, The World of Tim Frazer was broadcast as an 18-episode serial featuring three adventures with Jack Hedley in the title role. They attracted almost 80% of all TV viewers—partly because, at that time, many European countries had one TV station each.

In the sixties and seventies, many mini-series adapted from Durbridge's works were produced in Italy by RAI-TV. They featured some of the best Italian actors, among them Aroldo Tieri, Giuliana Lojodice, Nando Gazzolo, Ugo Pagliai, Luigi Vannucchi, Alberto Lupo and Rossano Brazzi. In France, TV scriptwriter and director Abder Isker produced some of Durbridge's adaptations for ORTF.

In the mid-1960s, mini-series based on the Paul Temple novels appeared on TV in Europe.

The 1969–1971 television series Paul Temple ran for 52 episodes over four seasons, with the last 39 episodes (seasons 2–4) being the first international television co-production, made by the BBC with Taurus Films of Munich, West Germany. Paul Temple was played by British actor Francis Matthews, with Ros Drinkwater playing Steve.

== Films ==
Calling Paul Temple is a 1948 British crime film directed by Maclean Rogers and starring John Bentley, Dinah Sheridan and Margaretta Scott. It was the second in a series of four Paul Temple films distributed by Butcher's Film Service. The first was Send for Paul Temple (1946), with Anthony Hulme as Paul Temple. John Bentley then took over the role in Calling Paul Temple, continuing for two further films: Paul Temple's Triumph (1950) and Paul Temple Returns (1952). It was produced by Ernest G. Roy at the Nettlefold Film Studios in Walton On Thames.

== Novels ==
Durbridge wrote many Paul Temple novels, but mostly worked with a co-author because he regarded himself as a writer of dialogue, a scriptwriter rather than a novelist. The first was Send for Paul Temple (1938), written in collaboration with the pseudonymous John Thewes - thought to have been Charles Hatton, with whom Durbridge collaborated on the following four Temple novelisations up until 1948. All of these books were rapidly adapted from Durbridge's original radio scripts in order to capitalise on the popularity of the radio serial. Publicity for Send for Paul Temple described it as "the novel of the thriller that created a BBC fan-mail record".

The two novels with Douglas Rutherford (The Tyler Mystery, 1957 and East of Algiers, 1959) appeared under the Paul Temple pen name. The Tyler Mystery is unusual in giving Temple's wife, Steve, a more central role. East of Algiers was partly based on the 1947 radio serial Paul Temple and the Sullivan Mystery. From The Kelby Affair (1970) on the novels are credited to Francis Durbridge alone.

Durbridge wrote three Tim Frazer novels: The World of Tim Frazer (1962), Tim Frazer Again (1964) and Tim Frazer Gets the Message (1978). Beware of Johnny Washington (1951, reissued by HarperCollins in 2017) was a substantially re-written version of the first Paul Temple novel, Send for Paul Temple, and there were three others based on Paul Temple scripts that were recycled as non-Temple books. Two titles, Back Room Girl (1950) and The Pig-Tail Murder (1969) were written as original novels, but most of the later books were adapted from the television plays of the 1960s and 1970s.

== Personal life ==
Durbridge married Norah Lawley in 1940. They had two sons. He died at his home in Barnes, London, aged 85, in 1998.

== List of radio plays and serials ==
The dates given are those of the first broadcast (and, in the case of serials, of the first episode):

=== Paul Temple ===
- Send for Paul Temple – 8 April 1938
- Paul Temple and the Front Page Men – 2 November 1938
- News of Paul Temple – 13 November 1939
- Paul Temple Intervenes – 30 October 1942
- Send for Paul Temple Again – 13 September 1945
- A Case for Paul Temple – 7 February 1946
- Paul Temple and the Gregory Affair – 17 October 1946
- Paul Temple and Steve – 30 March 1947
- Mr and Mrs Paul Temple – 21 November 1947
- Paul Temple and the Sullivan Mystery – 1 December 1947
- Paul Temple and the Curzon Case – 7 December 1948
- Paul Temple and the Madison Mystery – 12 October 1949
- Paul Temple and the Vandyke Affair – 3 November 1950
- Paul Temple and the Jonathan Mystery – 10 May 1951
- Paul Temple and Steve Again – 8 April 1953
- Paul Temple and the Gilbert Case – 2 April 1954
- Paul Temple and the Madison Mystery – 20 June 1955 (new production)
- Paul Temple and the Lawrence Affair – 11 April 1956
- Paul Temple and the Spencer Affair – 13 November 1957
- Paul Temple and the Vandyke Affair – 1 January 1959 (new production)
- Paul Temple and the Conrad Case – 2 March 1959
- Paul Temple and the Gilbert Case – 22 November 1959 (new production)
- Paul Temple and the Margo Mystery – 1 January 1961
- Paul Temple and the Jonathan Mystery – 14 October 1963 (new production)
- Paul Temple and the Geneva Mystery – 11 April 1965
- Paul Temple and the Alex Affair – 26 February 1968 (revised version of Send For Paul Temple Again)
- Paul Temple and the Sullivan Mystery – 7 August 2006 (new production)
- Paul Temple and Steve – 11 June 2010 (new production)

=== Other radio plays and serials ===
- Promotion – 3 October 1934
- Information Received – 25 February 1938
- We Were Strangers – 9 July 1940
- And Anthony Sherwood Laughed – 20 December 1940
- Mr Hartington Died Tomorrow § – 9 February 1942
- The Essential Heart ‡ – 6 February 1943
- Farewell Leicester Square § – 8 February 1943
- Over My Dead Body – 11 April 1945
- John Washington Esquire – 16 September 1949
- What Do You Think? – 12 September 1962
- La Boutique – 2 October 1967

§ as Lewis Middleton Harvey
‡ as Nicholas Vane

== List of British TV series ==
None of the episodes of The Francis Durbridge Serial are believed to have survived. All episodes of Francis Durbridge Presents survive except for The World of Tim Frazer of which only episode 3 and 10 (out of 18) are thought to still exist.

- A Francis Durbridge Serial
  - The Broken Horseshoe (1952)
  - Operation Diplomat (1952)
  - The Teckman Biography (1953–54)
  - Portrait of Alison (1955)
  - My Friend Charles (1956)
  - The Other Man (1956)
  - A Time of Day (1957)
  - The Scarf (1959)
- Francis Durbridge Presents
  - The World of Tim Frazer (1960–61)
  - The Desperate People (1963)
  - Melissa (1964)
  - A Man Called Harry Brent (1965)
  - A Game of Murder (1966)
  - Bat Out of Hell (1966)
- Paul Temple (52 episodes) (1969–71)
- Francis Durbridge Presents
  - The Passenger (1971)
  - Melissa (1974)
  - The Doll (1975)
  - Breakaway – The Family Affair (1980)
  - Breakaway – The Local Affair (1980)

In 1997, Channel 4 broadcast a version of Melissa, adapted by Alan Bleasdale from the Francis Durbridge novel. Jennifer Ehle played Melissa.

== List of German TV adaptations ==
- Der Andere (1959, based on The Other Man)
- Es ist soweit (1960, based on A Time Of Day)
- Das Halstuch (1962, based on The Scarf)
- Tim Frazer (1963, based on The World of Tim Frazer)
- Der Fall Salinger (1964, based on Tim Frazer: The Salinger Affair)
- Die Schlüssel (1965, based on The Desperate People)
- Melissa (1966, based on Melissa)
- Ein Mann namens Harry Brent (1968, based on A Man Called Harry Brent)
- Wie ein Blitz (1970, based on Bat Out of Hell), with Paul Hubschmid
- Das Messer (1971, loosely based on Tim Frazer: The Mellin Forrest Mystery), with Hardy Krüger
- Die Kette (1977, based on A Game Of Murder)

== List of Italian TV adaptations ==
- La sciarpa (1963, based on The Scarf)
- Paura per Janet (1964, based on A Time of Day), with Massimo Girotti
- Melissa (1966, based on Melissa), with Rossano Brazzi
- Giocando a golf una mattina (1969, based on A Game of Murder)
- Un certo Harry Brent (1970, based on A Man Called Harry Brent)
- Come un uragano (1971, based on Bat Out of Hell)
- Lungo il fiume e sull'acqua (1973, based on The Other Man)
- A casa, una sera... (1976, based on the stageplay Suddenly at Home), with Nino Castelnuovo
- Dimenticare Lisa (1976, based on The Doll), with Marilù Tolo
- Traffico d'armi nel golfo (1977, based on The World of Tim Frazer)
- Poco a poco (1980, based on the stageplay The Gentle Hook)

== List of French TV adaptations ==
- L'Écharpe (1966, based on The Scarf), directed by Abder Isker, with Raymond Pellegrin
- Mélissa (1968, based on Melissa)
- À corps perdu (1970, based on Bat Out of Hell), with Danièle Delorme
- La Mort d'un champion (1972, based on A Game Of Murder), with Marie-France Pisier
- Un certain Richard Dorian (1973, based on A Man Called Harry Brent), directed by Abder Isker
- La Passagère (1974, based on The Passenger), directed by Abder Isker
- La Mort d'un touriste (1975, based on Tim Frazer: The Salinger Affair)

== List of Polish TV adaptations ==
- Szal (1970, based on The Scarf)
- Melissa (1970, based on Melissa)
- W biały dzień (1971, based on A Time Of Day)
- Harry Brent (1972, based on A Man Called Harry Brent)
- Jak błyskawica (1972, based on Bat Out of Hell)
- Desperaci (1974, based on The Desperate People)
- Brutalna gra (1976, based on A Game of Murder)
- Odwet (1985, based on Murder With Love)

== Other TV adaptations ==
Sweden

- Halsduken (1962, based on The Scarf)

Finland

- Huivi (1962, based on The Scarf)

Netherlands

- Paul Vlaanderen

== List of plays ==
- Suddenly at Home (1971)
- The Gentle Hook (1974)
- House Guest (1976)
- Murder with Love (1976)
- Deadly Nightcap (1983)
- A Touch of Danger (1987)
- The Small Hours (1991)
- Sweet Revenge (1993)
- Fatal Encounter (2002-posthumous)

== List of films ==
- 1946 Send for Paul Temple (with Anthony Hulme as Paul Temple)
- 1948 Calling Paul Temple (based upon Send for Paul Temple Again, with John Bentley as Paul Temple)
- 1950 Paul Temple's Triumph (based upon News of Paul Temple, with John Bentley as Paul Temple)
- 1952 Paul Temple Returns (based upon Paul Temple Intervenes, with John Bentley as Paul Temple)
- 1953 The Broken Horseshoe (based on the 1952 BBC TV series)
- 1953 Operation Diplomat (based on the 1952 BBC TV series)
- 1954 The Teckman Mystery (based upon The Teckman Biography)
- 1955 Portrait of Alison (U.S. title: Postmark for Danger) (based upon Portrait of Alison)
- 1957 The Vicious Circle (based upon My Friend Charles)
- 1963 Piccadilly Zero Hour 12 (based upon Step in the Dark)
- 1964 Tim Frazer and the Mysterious Mister X is an Austrian/Belgian co-production based on the Tim Frazer character

== List of novels ==
=== Paul Temple novels ===
- Send for Paul Temple (1938) (with John Thewes, aka Charles Hatton?)
- Paul Temple and the Front Page Men (1939) (with Charles Hatton)
- News of Paul Temple (1940) (with Charles Hatton)
- Paul Temple Intervenes (1944) (with Charles Hatton)
- Send for Paul Temple Again! (1948) (with Charles Hatton)
- The Tyler Mystery (1957) by 'Paul Temple' (with Douglas Rutherford)
- East of Algiers (1959) by 'Paul Temple' (with Douglas Rutherford)
- Paul Temple and the Kelby Affair (1970)
- Paul Temple and the Harkdale Robbery (1970)
- The Geneva Mystery (1971)
- The Curzon Case (1971)
- Paul Temple and the Margo Mystery (1986)
- Paul Temple and the Madison Case (1988)

=== Tim Frazer novels ===
- The World of Tim Frazer (1962)
- Tim Frazer Again (1964)
- Tim Frazer Gets the Message (1978)

=== Other novels ===
- Back Room Girl (1950)
- Beware of Johnny Washington (1951) (a re-writing of Send for Paul Temple)
- Design for Murder (1951) (based on Paul Temple and the Gregory Affair, 1946)
- The Other Man (1958)
- A Time of Day (1959)
- The Scarf (1960)
- Portrait of Alison (1962)
- My Friend Charles (1963)
- Another Woman's Shoes (1965) (based on Paul Temple and the Gilbert Case, 1954)
- The Desperate People (1966)
- Dead to the World (1967) (based on Paul Temple and the Jonathan Mystery, 1951, 1963)
- My Wife Melissa (1967)
- The Pig-Tail Murder (1969) (based on Step in the Dark, the screenplay for Piccadilly Zero Hour 12, 1963)
- A Man Called Harry Brent (1970)
- Bat out of Hell (1972)
- A Game of Murder (1975)
- The Passenger (1977)
- Breakaway (1981)
- The Doll (1982)
