= Ros Drinkwater =

British actress (1944–2022)

- Born: 14 February 1944; Glasgow, Scotland
- Died: July 2022 (aged 78)
- Occupations: Actress, journalist

Ros Drinkwater (14 February 1944 – July 2022) was a Scottish actress, best known for her portrayal of Paul Temple's wife, Steve, in the eponymous television series, based on the character created by Francis Durbridge. She later moved into photojournalism.

== Life and career ==
Drinkwater was born in Glasgow, Scotland on 14 February 1944. Her family was Anglo-Irish and her grandfather had been in the Indian Army.

Drinkwater worked as a dancer in Las Vegas before turning to acting. In the late 1960s, she appeared in a number of episodes of British television series, including Dr. Finlay's Casebook ("A Matter of Confidence", 1966), Champion House ("The Saddest Words", 1967), The Saint ("Invitation to Danger", 1968) and Special Branch ("The Kazmirov Affair", 1969). She also appeared briefly in the film Song of Norway (1970) as one of Franz Liszt's friends.

Drinkwater's best known role was as Steve Temple (née Louise Harvey; in the earlier radio serials, a Fleet Street journalist using the name Steve Trent) the wife of writer/detective Paul Temple (Francis Matthews), in Paul Temple (1969–71). This was a co-production by the BBC and Taurus Films of Munich, West Germany. According to Matthews, Drinkwater chose her own "very expensive" designer clothes for the part.

Paul Temple lasted for two years and was popular in West Germany. (Note: In the dubbed German version of the series, Temple referred to his wife as Stiefelchen (little boot)) There appears to have been some disagreement between the BBC and Taurus over the casting of Steve Temple (who had been played in the radio series of Paul Temple from 1945 to 1968 by Marjorie Westbury), with the BBC wishing to drop Drinkwater, but Taurus favouring her retention.

She subsequently became a photojournalist, based in Ireland, where she had a small farm in County Monaghan.

Drinkwater died from lung cancer in July 2022, aged 78.
