= Max Eckard =

German actor

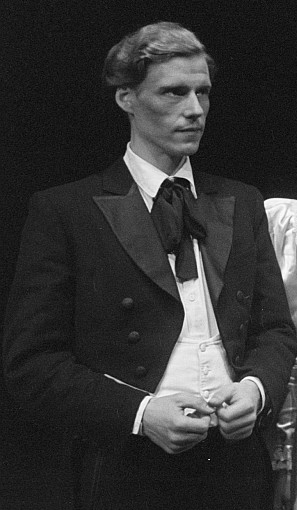
- Eckard in 1945.
- Born: 25 October 1914; Kiel, German Empire
- Died: 6 December 1998 (aged 84); Germany
- Occupation: Actor
- Years active: 1934-1981 (film & TV)

Max Eckard (1914–1998) was a German film and television actor. He played the title role in the television series Tim Frazer for which he was awarded a Bravo Otto in 1964.

== Selected filmography ==
- Trouble with Jolanthe (1934)
- The Girl from Barnhelm (1940)
- Two Worlds (1940)
- Wozzeck (1947)
- Journey to Happiness (1948)
- Don't Dream, Annette (1948)
- Search for Majora (1949)
- The Sergeant's Daughter (1952)
- Faust (1960)
- Tim Frazer (1963–64, TV series)

== Bibliography ==
- Compart, Martin. Crime TV: Lexikon der Krimiserien. Bertz, 2000.
- Hickethier, Knut & Hoff, Peter. Geschichte des deutschen Fernsehen. J.B. Metzler, 2016.
