= Tim Frazer (TV series) =

German television series

- Genre: Thriller
- Based on: The World Of Tim Frazer by Francis Durbridge
- Written by: Marianne de Barde
- Directed by: Hans Quest
- Starring: Max Eckard; Konrad Georg; Marianne Koch
- Composer: Hans Jönsson
- Country of origin: West Germany
- Original language: German
- No. of series: 2
- No. of episodes: 12

Production
- Producer: Wilhelm Semmelroth
- Production company: Westdeutscher Rundfunk

Original release
- Network: ARD
- Release: 14 January 1963 – 18 January 1964

Tim Frazer was a West German thriller television series that was broadcast by ARD between January 1963 and January 1964. Consisting of two series of six episodes each, it was inspired by the British television serial The World of Tim Frazer by Francis Durbridge. Max Eckard played the title character, a structural engineer who gets mixed up in espionage and other adventures. The second series was known as Tim Frazer – Der Fall Salinger.

== Main cast ==
- Max Eckard as Tim Frazer
- Konrad Georg as Charles Ross
- Marianne Koch as Helen Baker
- Ingrid Ernest as Barbara Day
- Hartmut Reck as Lewis Richards
- Paul Klinger as Dr Killick
- Manfred Heidmann as Arthur Fairlee
- Ernst Fritz Fürbringer as Donald Edwards
- Eva Pflug as Vivien Gilmore
- Ursula Herking as Ruth Edwards
- Max Mairich as Gordon Dempsey
- Josef Dahmen as Edgar Tupper
- Walter Jokisch as Norman Gibson
- Kurt Waitzmann as Arthur Crombie
- Siegfried Wischnewski as Detective Inspector Truemann
- Klaus Kindler as Lester
- Hermann Lenschau as Mr van Dakar
- Kurt Postel as Hobson

== Bibliography ==
- Bock, Hans-Michael & Bergfelder, Tim. The Concise Cinegraph: Encyclopaedia of German Cinema. Berghahn Books, 2009.
- Mann, Dave. Harry Alan Towers: The Transnational Career of a Cinematic Contrarian. McFarland, 2014.
