= The Broken Horseshoe (film) =

1953 British crime drama by Martyn C. Webster

- Original Australian daybill
- Directed by: Martyn C. Webster
- Written by: A. R. Rawlinson
- Based on: the television serial by Francis Durbridge
- Produced by: Ernest G. Roy
- Starring: Robert Beatty; Elizabeth Sellars
- Cinematography: Gerald Gibbs
- Edited by: Joseph Sterling
- Music by: Wilfred Burns
- Production company: Nettlefold Films (UK)
- Distributed by: Butcher's Film Service
- Release date: 1953 (UK)
- Running time: 77 minutes
- Country: United Kingdom
- Language: English

The Broken Horseshoe is a 1953 British "B" crime film directed by Martyn C. Webster and starring Robert Beatty, Elizabeth Sellars, Peter Coke, and Hugh Kelly. It was written by A. R. Rawlinson based on the BBC television series of the same title from the previous year. A surgeon is drawn into a murder case.

== Plot ==
A hit-and-run victim is operated on by Dr Fenton, but the patient is later murdered, and the doctor finds himself the prime suspect. The mysterious Della, connected to a horse-doping ring, falls for the doctor and helps him clear his name and expose the villains.

== Cast ==
- Robert Beatty as Dr Mark Fenton
- Elizabeth Sellars as Della Freeman
- Peter Coke as Detective Inspector George Bellamy
- Hugh Kelly as Dr Craig
- Janet Butler as Sister Rogers
- Vida Hope as Jackie Leroy
- Ferdy Mayne as Charles Constance
- James Raglan as Superintendent Grayson
- George Benson as Prescott
- Roger Delgado as Felix Gallegos
- Ronald Leigh-Hunt as Sergeant Lewis
- Hugh Pryse as Mr Rattray
- Toke Townley as Fred Barker

== Critical reception ==
Kine Weekly said "The shrewdly chosen leading players neatly handle the bizarre plot, and their alert team work, amplified by a wide variety of appropriate and realistic backgrounds, leads to an intriguing amalgam of sentiment and homicide. Loose ends are securely tied at the finish, and there is no lack of surprise. Good average British thriller."

Monthly Film Bulletin said "a competently made little thriller, convincing at the time, although some loose ends are left. An amusing character part is played by Vida Hope."

In British Sound Films: The Studio Years 1928–1959 David Quinlan rated the film as "average", writing: "Rare coincidence of director, writer (Durbridge) and star (Peter Coke) from radio's famous Paul Temple series. But thriller is fairly ordinary."

Chibnall and McFarlane in The British 'B' Film wrote: "Some brisk direction ensured that the film rose above the average supporting mystery thriller."
