= Bernadette O'Farrell =

Irish actress (1924–1999)

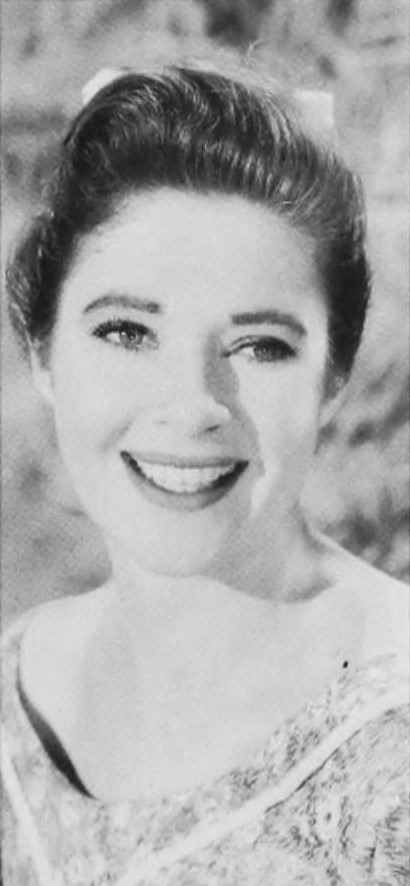
- As Maid Marian in The Adventures of Robin Hood
- Born: 30 January 1924; Birr, County Offaly, Ireland
- Died: 26 September 1999 (aged 75); Monaco
- Occupation: Actress
- Years active: 1947–1959
- Spouse: Frank Launder (m. 1950; died 1997)
- Children: 2

Bernadette Mary O'Farrell (30 January 1924 – 26 September 1999) was an Irish actress in film and television, best known for playing Maid Marian in the 1950s.

== Early years ==
O'Farrell was born in Birr, County Offaly, Irish Free State. Her mother was an amateur actress, and her father managed a bank. She attended a convent school, and worked as a secretary as a young woman.

== Career ==
O'Farrell broke into film work in her twenties, after being introduced to English director Carol Reed. She is best known for playing Maid Marian in the 1950s British television adaptation of The Adventures of Robin Hood, co-starring Donald Pleasence, Paul Eddington, Richard O'Sullivan, and Richard Greene. It was one of the first British television productions to find an audience in North America, and O'Farrell and Greene made a publicity tour in the United States in 1956, to support the show. She left the show in 1957, after 78 episodes, to avoid type-casting, and was replaced by Patricia Driscoll.

She played an English school mistress, Miss Harper, in The Happiest Days of Your Life (1949), Jessie Bond in The Story of Gilbert and Sullivan (1953) and Peg Curtis in the boxing film The Square Ring (1953).

She retired from acting in 1959 to live on a farm in Buckinghamshire, England. Later, O'Farrell and Launder moved to Monaco. Her last film appearance was in The Wildcats of St. Trinian's (1980).

== Personal life ==
After appearing in his production of The Happiest Days of Your Life, O'Farrell married the film writer, director and producer Frank Launder in 1950. He died in 1997. They had two daughters together, Georgina and Aisling. O'Farrell died in 1999, at the age of 75, in Monaco.

== Filmography ==
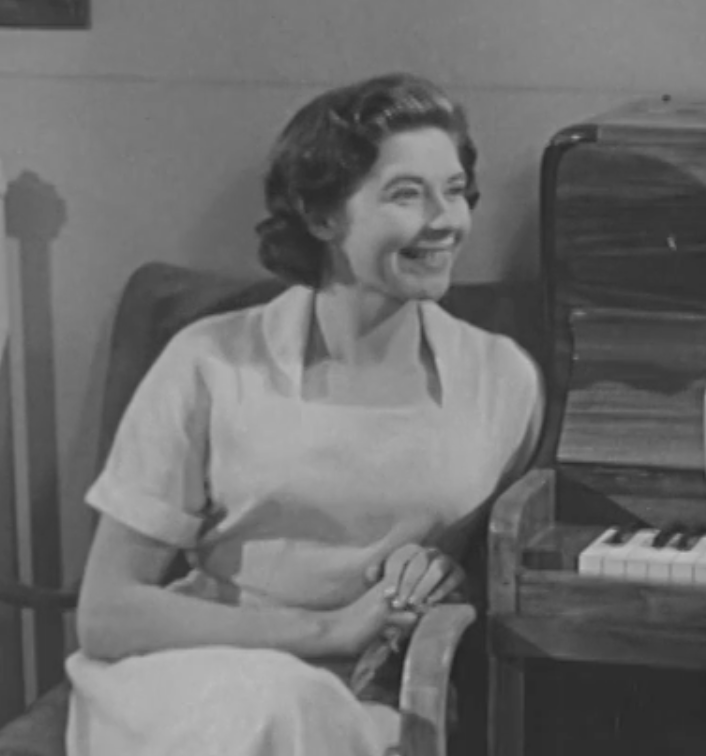
As nurse Mary Gordon in Life in Her Hands (1951)

Year	Title	Role	Notes
1947	Captain Boycott	Mrs. Fagan	
1950	The Happiest Days of Your Life	Miss Harper	
1951	Life in Her Hands	Mary Gordon	
1951	Lady Godiva Rides Again	Janie	
1952	Lady in the Fog	Heather McMara	
1953	The Story of Gilbert and Sullivan	Jessie Bond	
1953	The Genie		
1953	The Square Ring	Peg Curtis	
1959	The Bridal Path	Siona	
1980	The Wildcats of St Trinians	Miss Carfax	(final film role)
