= The Broken Horseshoe (TV series) =

1952 British TV drama series

- Genre: Thriller serial
- Written by: Francis Durbridge
- Starring: John Robinson; John Byron; Andrew Crawford; Robert Adair
- No. of seasons: 1
- No. of episodes: 6 (all missing)

Production
- Producer: Martyn C. Webster
- Running time: 30 min.

Original release
- Release: March 15 – April 19, 1952

Related
- The Broken Horseshoe (film)

The Broken Horseshoe is a British six-part television series first aired by the BBC in 1952 featuring John Robinson, John Byron, Andrew Crawford and Robert Adair. A crime thriller series, the plot concerns a public-spirited doctor's involvement with a horse-doping gang after he protects a young woman who is a witness to a murder carried out by the syndicate. It was written by Francis Durbridge and aired in six half-hour parts on Saturday nights. It was the first thriller serial aired by the BBC.

== Episodes ==
- 1. Mr Constance
- 2. Mr Felix Gallegos
- 3. Miss Jackie Leroy
- 4. Mr Ernest Carrol
- 5. Mr Mark Fenton
- 6. Operation Horseshoe

== Cast ==
- John Robinson as Mark Fenton
- John Byron as Inspector George Bellamy
- Andrew Crawford as Dr. Duncan Craig
- Robert Adair as Felix Galegos
- Elizabeth Maude as Sister Rogers
- Barbara Lott as Della Freeman

== Archive status ==
The Broken Horseshoe was broadcast live from the historic studios at Alexandra Palace and never actually recorded. As with all the 1950s Francis Durbridge-based serials, no episodes survive.

== Adaptation ==
In 1953 a film The Broken Horseshoe was made based on the series starring Robert Beatty.
