= Robert Beatty =

Canadian actor (1909–1992)

- Born: Robert Rutherford Beatty; 19 October 1909; Hamilton, Ontario, Canada
- Died: 3 March 1992 (aged 82); London, England
- Occupation: Actor
- Years active: 1939–1989

Robert Rutherford Beatty (19 October 1909 – 3 March 1992) was a Canadian actor who worked in film, television and radio for most of his career and was especially known in the UK.

== Early life ==
Beatty was born in Hamilton, Ontario, the son of Charles Thompson Beatty and Blanch Sarah Rutherford. He attended Delta Collegiate School and earned a Bachelor of Arts degree from the University of Toronto. He began his acting career in Britain in 1939.

== Career ==
=== Stage ===
Beatty joined the Players' Guild of Hamilton after graduation from the University of Toronto. He went to London, England, in 1936 and joined the Royal Academy of Dramatic Art. It was with the RADA that he made his English stage debut. In 1939 he appeared in the West End in N.C. Hunter's comedy Grouse in June.

=== Film ===
Beatty's film credits include: San Demetrio London (1943), Odd Man Out (1947), Another Shore (1948), Against the Wind (1948), Captain Horatio Hornblower R.N. (1951), The Square Ring (1953), Portrait of Alison / Postmark for Danger (1955), Something of Value, Time lock (1957), The Amorous Prawn (1962), 2001: A Space Odyssey (1968), Where Eagles Dare (1968), The Pink Panther Strikes Again (1976), Superman III (1983), Minder on the Orient Express (1985) and Superman IV: The Quest for Peace (1987).

Beatty appeared in two "critically acclaimed war propaganda films" in 1942 – 49th Parallel and One of Our Aircraft Is Missing.

=== Television ===
In the 1950s, he was host of the BBC programme Saturday Night Out, a live outside-broadcast magazine programme, in which he was known as "The Man with the Mike". He played Bulldog Drummond in 1957 in the episode "The Ludlow Affair" of Douglas Fairbanks Presents. In 1958–59, he played Detective Inspector Mike Maguire in the police series Dial 999 (a co-production between Britain's ABC and the US company Ziv). He also appeared in Doctor Who ("The Tenth Planet" as General Cutler), Blake's 7 ("The Way Back" as Bran Foster), The Gathering Storm, Thriller (1976), The New Avengers, and Minder. He was in Franco Zeffirelli's TV mini-series Jesus of Nazareth and the American series of Ray Bradbury's The Martian Chronicles. He portrayed Ronald Reagan in Breakthrough at Reykjavik (Granada Television UK 1987).

=== Radio ===
Beatty reported descriptions of the Blitz from London to North America via the BBC during World War II. He played Philip Odell, a fictional Irish detective created by Lester Powell, between 1947 and 1961. The series debuted on BBC radio with the story "Lady in a Fog" in October 1947. The series was made available to overseas broadcasters by the BBC Transcription Services. His other radio credits included Shadow of Sumuru on the BBC Home Programme in 1945–46, Shadow Man on Radio Luxembourg in 1955, Destination – Fire! Stories of a Fire Investigator on the BBC Light Programme (1962–1966), General Sternwood in a BBC version of Raymond Chandler's The Big Sleep (1977), Pay Any Price (BBC 1982), The Mystery of the Blue Train (BBC 1985/1986), and as Henry Hickslaughter in Elizabeth Troop's Sony Award winning adaptation of Graham Greene's short story Cheap in August (1993).

== Death ==
Beatty died 3 March 1992, in London, aged 82, and was cremated at Putney Vale Crematorium.

== Filmography ==
- Black Limelight (1939) as Extra (uncredited)
- Murder in Soho (1939) as Jack (uncredited)
- Dangerous Moonlight (1941) as Reporter with Carol (uncredited)
- 49th Parallel (1941) as RCMP Mountie in Alberta (voice, uncredited)
- One of Our Aircraft Is Missing (1942) as Sgt. Hopkins
- Suspected Person (1942) as Franklin
- Flying Fortress (1942) as Connor (uncredited)
- The First of the Few (1942) as American Airman (uncredited)
- San Demetrio London (1943) as 'Yank' Preston
- It Happened One Sunday (1944) as Tom Stevens
- A Matter of Life and Death (1946) as US Crewman (uncredited)
- Appointment with Crime (1946) as Det. Insp. Rogers
- Odd Man Out (1947) as Dennis
- Green Fingers (1947) as Thomas Stone
- Against the Wind (1948) as Father Philip
- Counterblast (1948) as Dr. Paul Rankin
- Another Shore (1948) as Gulliver
- Portrait from Life (1948) as Campbell Reid
- The Twenty Questions Murder Mystery (1950) as Bob Beacham
- Her Favourite Husband (1950) as Antonio Pellegrini
- Captain Horatio Hornblower R.N. (1951) as Lt. William Bush
- Calling Bulldog Drummond (1951) as Arthur Gunns
- The Magic Box (1951) as Lord Beaverbrook
- Wings of Danger (1952) as Nick Talbot
- The Gentle Gunman (1952) as Shinto
- The Broken Horseshoe (1953) as Dr. Mark Fenton
- The Net (1953) as Maj. Sam Seagram
- Man on a Tightrope (1953) as Barovic
- The Oracle (1953) as Bob Jefferson
- The Square Ring (1953) as Kid Curtis
- Albert R.N. (1953) as Jim
- Loves of Three Queens (1954) as Menelao (segment: The Face That Launched a Thousand Ships)
- Out of the Clouds (1955) as Nick Millbourne
- Portrait of Alison (1955) as Tim Forrester
- Tarzan and the Lost Safari (1957) as Tusker Hawkins
- Something of Value (1957) as Elizabeth's Husband – Jeff Newton
- Time Lock (1957) as Pete Dawson
- The Shakedown (1960) as Chief Insp. Bob Jarvis
- Invitation to Murder (1962)
- The Amorous Prawn (1962) as Larry Hoffman
- The Secret of Dr. Mabuse (1964) as Col. Matson
- Doctor Who (1966) The Tenth Planet as General Cutler
- The 25th Hour (1967) as Col. Greenfield
- Bikini Paradise (1967) as Commissioner
- 2001: A Space Odyssey (1968) as Dr. Ralph Halvorsen
- Where Eagles Dare (1968) as General George Carnaby / Corporal Cartwright Jones
- Sitting Target (1972) as Gun Dealer
- Pope Joan (1972) as Dr. Corwin
- The Spikes Gang (1974) as Sheriff (credit only)
- The Gathering Storm (1974) as Lord Beaverbrook
- The Pink Panther Strikes Again (1976) as U.S. Admiral
- Jesus of Nazareth (1977, TV Mini-Series) as Proculus
- Golden Rendezvous (1977) as Dr. Taubman
- The Spaceman and King Arthur (1979) as Senator Milburn
- The Amateur (1981) as Ambassador Neville
- Superman III (1983) as Tanker Captain
- Labyrinth (1986) as Left Door Knocker (voice)
- Superman IV: The Quest for Peace (1987) as U.S. President
