= The World of Tim Frazer =

1960 British BBC TV series

- Genre: Thriller
- Written by: Francis Durbridge
- Directed by: Richmond Harding
- Starring: Jack Hedley; Ralph Michael; Francis Matthews
- Country of origin: United Kingdom
- Original language: English
- No. of series: 1
- No. of episodes: 18

Production
- Producer: Richmond Harding
- Running time: 30 minutes
- Production company: BBC

Original release
- Network: BBC One
- Release: 15 November 1960 – 14 March 1961

The World of Tim Frazer is a British thriller television series that originally aired on BBC One in eighteen episodes between 15 November 1960 and 14 March 1961. It was written by Francis Durbridge. It stars Jack Hedley as an engineer who becomes drawn into espionage and crime. In 1963 it was remade as the West German television series, Tim Frazer. In 1962 Durbridge produced a novel The World of Tim Frazer based on the TV series, and wrote a further two novels featuring the character.

== Main cast ==
- Jack Hedley as Tim Frazer
- Ralph Michael as Charles Ross
- Francis Matthews as Lewis Richards
- Patricia Haines as Barbara Day
- Heather Chasen as Helen Baker
- Gerald Cross as Dr Killick
- Jack Watling as Major Lockwood
- Michael Aldridge as Arthur Fairlee
- Laurence Hardy as Elwyn Roberts
- Redmond Phillips as Donald Edwards
- Walter Horsbrugh as Dr Norman Vincent
- Hazel Hughes as Mrs Crichton
- Patricia Marmont as Vivien Gilmore
- Barbara Couper as Ruth Edwards
- David Langton as Roger Thornton
- Fred Ferris as Norman Gibson
- Kenneth J. Warren as Gordon Dempsey
- Brian Wilde as Tupper

== Episodes ==
Out of all the episodes produced for the series episodes 1, 2, 4, 5 and 6 are believed to be lost.

== Bibliography ==
- Bock, Hans-Michael & Bergfelder, Tim. The Concise Cinegraph: Encyclopaedia of German Cinema. Berghahn Books, 2009.
- Baskin, Ellen. Serials on British Television, 1950-1994. Scolar Press, 1996.
