= Molly Dean =

Molly Dean may refer to:

- Molly Dean, character in A Night Like This (1932 film)
- Molly Dean, character in Headline (film)
