= Sidney Vivian =

British actor (1901–1984)

- in Gideon's Way:The Tin God (1964)
- Born: Sidney Drapkin; 18 April 1901; Prestwich, Lancashire, England
- Died: 22 December 1984 (aged 83); St Albans, Hertfordshire, England
- Occupation: Actor
- Years active: 1947–1970

Sidney Vivian (18 April 1901 – 22 December 1984) was a British stage, film and television actor.

== Selected filmography ==
=== Film appearances ===
- Dick Barton Strikes Back (1949) - Inspector Burke
- Doctor Morelle (1949) - Inspector Hood
- Diamond City (1949) - Reader (uncredited)
- Double Confession (1950) - Ring Stall Attendant
- No Trace (1950) - Barman
- Lady Godiva Rides Again (1951) - Councillor
- Whispering Smith Hits London (1951) - Hotel Porter
- Down Among the Z Men (1952) - Landlord Isaiah Crabb
- The Great Game (1953) - Club Chairman
- Stryker of the Yard (1953)
- One Stop Shop (1953) - Jim Brown
- The Scamp (1957) - Drunken Reveller
- Rogue's Yarn (1957) - Corner Shop Proprietor
- Carve Her Name with Pride (1958) - Bus Passenger (uncredited)
- The Key (1958) - Grogan
- The Secret Partner (1961) - Dock Foreman
- Mary Had a Little... (1961) - Grimmick
- Offbeat (1961) - Sam French
- Emergency (1962) - Shaw
- Gaolbreak (1962) - Mr. Marshall
- The Pot Carriers (1962) - Bus Conductor
- The Day of the Triffids (1963) - Ticket Agent (uncredited)
- I Could Go On Singing (1963) - Stagehand (uncredited)
- Hide and Seek (1964) - Commissionaire
- Subterfuge (1968) - Taxi Driver

=== Television appearances ===
- Frankly Howerd (1959) - Fred Thompson
- Hancock's Half Hour (1960) - Harry
- No Hiding Place (1961) -1st Barber
- Sergeant Cork (1964) - Barman
- Gideon's Way (1964) - Danny
- Hadleigh (1969) - Barman
- Doctor in the House (1969-1970) - College Officer

=== Stage appearances ===
- She Wanted a Cream Front Door (Apollo Theatre, 1947)
