= John Salew =

English actor (1902–1961)

- in The Saint Meets the Tiger (1943)
- Born: John Rylett Salew; 28 February 1902; Southsea, Hampshire, England
- Died: 14 September 1961 (aged 58–59); Hammersmith, London, England
- Occupation: Film actor
- Years active: 1938–1961

John Rylett Salew (28 February 1902 (some sources state 1 January 1897) – 14 September 1961) was an English stage film and TV actor. Salew made the transition from stage to films in 1939, and according to Allmovie, "the manpower shortage during WWII enabled the stout, balding Salew to play larger and more important roles than would have been his lot in other circumstances. He usually played suspicious-looking characters, often Germanic in origin." His screen roles included William Shakespeare in the comic fantasy Time Flies (1944), Grimstone in the Gothic melodrama Uncle Silas (1947), and the librarian in the supernatural thriller Night of the Demon (1957). He played Colonel Wentzel in the Adventures of William Tell "The Shrew" episode (1958). John Salew was active into the TV era, playing the sort of character parts that John McGiver played in the US

== Selected filmography ==
- It's in the Air (1938) – RAF Radio Operator (uncredited)
- Dead Men are Dangerous (1939) – Tramp (uncredited)
- The Silent Battle (1939) – Ernest
- The Chinese Bungalow (1940) – Mr. Lum
- Pastor Hall (1940)
- A Window in London (1940) – Reporter
- The Thief of Bagdad (1940) – Fish Peddler (uncredited)
- Neutral Port (1940) – Wilson
- Sailors Don't Care (1940) – Henri
- The Farmer's Wife (1941) – Mr. Rundle
- Inspector Hornleigh Goes To It (1941) – Mr. Tomboy
- Turned Out Nice Again (1941) – Largos
- Once a Crook (1941) – Solicitor
- Atlantic Ferry (1941) – Henry
- Back-Room Boy (1942) – Steve Mason
- One of Our Aircraft Is Missing (1942) – German Sentry
- Suspected Person (1942) – Jones
- The Day Will Dawn (1942) – "Man-in-the-Street" in Fleet Street Pub
- The Young Mr. Pitt (1942) – Smith
- Secret Mission (1942) – Hauptmann Gruening
- Squadron Leader X (1943) – Sentry at Madame Berthelot's (uncredited)
- Tomorrow We Live (1943) – Marcel LaBlanc
- We Dive at Dawn (1943) – Drake (uncredited)
- The Bells Go Down (1943) – Landlord (uncredited)
- Warn That Man (1943) – Wilson
- The Saint Meets the Tiger (1943) – Merridon (curator of the Baycome Museum)
- Millions Like Us (1943) – The Doctor
- The Adventures of Tartu (1943) – Heinrich Müller (uncredited)
- The Night Invader (1943) – Witsen
- The Hundred Pound Window (1944) – Walker
- Tawny Pipit (1944) – Pickering
- Time Flies (1944) – William Shakespeare
- The Way Ahead (1944) – Sam – Friend of Pvt Lloyd in Pub Scene (uncredited)
- Give Us the Moon (1944) – (uncredited)
- Don't Take It to Heart (1944) – Dr. Rose, witness
- Candles at Nine (1944) – Griggs – Everard's Butler
- Murder in Reverse (1945) – Blake King's Counsel
- The Rake's Progress (1945) – Burgess
- Caravan (1946) – Diego
- Beware of Pity (1946) – Col. Franz Bubencic
- Bothered by a Beard (1946) as man in bath
- Wanted for Murder (1946) – Det. Walters
- I See a Dark Stranger (1946) – Man in Bookshop
- Bedelia (1946) – Alec Johnstone
- A Girl in a Million (1946) – Jenkins
- Meet Me at Dawn (1947) – 2nd Client
- The Life and Adventures of Nicholas Nickleby (1947) – Mr. Lillyrick
- Dancing with Crime (1947) – Pogson (uncredited)
- The October Man (1947) – Ticket Inspector
- Uncle Silas (1947) – Grimstone
- It Always Rains on Sunday (1947) – Caleb Neesley
- Anna Karenina (1948) – Lawyer
- My Brother Jonathan (1948) – Wilburn
- Counterblast (1948) – Padre Latham
- Bond Street (1948) – Coles
- London Belongs to Me (1948) – Mr. Barks
- Noose (1948) – Greasy Anderson
- Quartet (1948) – John Coleman, critic (segment "The Colonel's Lady")
- It's Hard to Be Good (1948) – Committee Man (uncredited)
- Brass Monkey (1948) – Captain
- Marry Me! (1949) - Charlie (uncredited)
- All Over the Town (1949) – George Sleek
- Cardboard Cavalier (1949) – Smug
- The Bad Lord Byron (1949) – Samuel Rogers
- For Them That Trespass (1949) – Prosecutor Ainsley
- Kind Hearts and Coronets (1949) – Mr. Perkins
- No Way Back (1949) – Sammy Linkman
- Don't Ever Leave Me (1949) – Farlaine's Manager
- Diamond City (1949) – Dr. Woods
- The Spider and the Fly (1949) – Minister's Secretary
- The Twenty Questions Murder Mystery (1950) – John Grimshaw
- The Blue Lamp (1950) – Officious Man (uncredited)
- The Astonished Heart (1950) – Mr. Bowman
- The Lavender Hill Mob (1951) – Parkin
- No Highway in the Sky (1951) – Symes, Gander Inspector (uncredited)
- Hotel Sahara (1951) – American Husband (uncredited)
- Mystery Junction (1951) – John Martin
- Green Grow the Rushes (1951) – Herbert Finch
- Night Was Our Friend (1951) – Mr. Lloyd
- His Excellency (1952) – Fernando
- The Happy Family (1952) – Mr. Granite
- Street Corner (1953) – Embarrassed Nightclub Patron (uncredited)
- Stryker of the Yard (1953)
- Face the Music (1954) – Maxie Margulies
- Father Brown (1954) – Station Sergeant
- Duel in the Jungle (1954) – Clerk – Henderson's Office
- Lease of Life (1954) – A Doctor
- Three Cases of Murder (1955) – Rooke ("The Picture" segment)
- Wicked as They Come (1956) – M.C. Page, Chief Accountant (uncredited)
- It's Great to Be Young (1956) – Routledge, a senior Master
- The Good Companions (1957) – Mr. Joe Brundit
- Night of the Demon (1957) – Librarian
- Rogue's Yarn (1957) – Sam Youles
- Alive on Saturday (1957) – Melito
- The Gypsy and the Gentleman (1958) – Duffin the Butler
- Tread Softly Stranger (1958) – Pawnbroker
- Left Right and Centre (1959) – Centre – Mayor
- The Heart of a Man (1959) – Agent at Bar (uncredited)
- Alive and Kicking (1959) – Solicitor
- The Shakedown (1960) – John Arnold
- Too Hot to Handle (1960) – Moeller
- The Impersonator (1960) – Harry Walker
- Three on a Spree (1961) – Mr. Monkton
- Scotland Yard (1961) - The Never Never Murder- Wilkes
- Maigret (TV) (1961) - The Simple Case - Doctor Paul
