= Michael Mataka =

Zambian police officer

- Other name: Mikaeli Mataka
- Police career
- Country: Northern Rhodesia, Zambia
- Allegiance: Zambia
- Service years: 1950s to 1970
- Rank: Assistant Inspector, Grade 1 (1960); Commissioner of Police (1965)
- Awards: Colonial Police Medal
- Other work: Diplomat

Michael Mataka is notable in making history as the first native African to become commissioner of the Zambian police. He also had a featured role in George Marshall directed film Duel in the Jungle.

== Police career ==
Mataka joined the Northern Rhodesia police force in 1941 as a constable. Later he became senior instructor at the training depot. In 1952, he was an Inspector with the Northern Rhodesia Police Force. Also at age 39, he was the first African to be promoted to the rank of Assistant Inspector, Grade 1. On November 1, 1965, it was announced in Lusaka that Mataka was to be appointed as the first Zambian Commissioner of Police. He replaced the previous commissioner, British born Lawson Hicks.

In 1969, he was still Police Commissioner. In 1970, following a traffic accident from which he received serious physical injuries, he was retired on medical grounds. In 1975, 1977, he was on the Kitui Liquor licensing Board.

== Post police career ==
In 1975, 1977, he was on the Kitui Liquor licensing Board. He was also a diplomat in Angola and Egypt.

== Duel in the Jungle ==
In 1954, Mataka appeared in Duel in the Jungle, a film that starred Jeanne Crain, Dana Andrews, David Farrar and Patrick Barr. In the film which was shot in Africa, he played the guide Vincent. Mataka was praised by director George Marshall for his performance in the film and described as priceless. His role in the film was quite prominent. Marshall was looking for a man to man to play the role of Vincent and when he went to the police station to discuss some issues, he saw Mataka who at the time was a 32-year-old inspector. Mataka filled the requirements of having the impressive appearance and high intelligence. He was what Marshall needed for the film. He was borrowed from the force for three months to work in the film. Mataka was invaluable to Marshall and helped as second assistant director. He helped with the local dialects that were spoken by the extras and he knew the conditions locally, and he couldn't have got anywhere without his help in directing the native extras. Marshall said he was the best second assistant director he ever had. Mataka was offered a contract but after the film, he returned to police work in Livingstone saying that he preferred police work to acting.
