= Here's George =

1932 film

- Ruth Taylor, George Clarke and Pat Paterson in the film
- Directed by: Redd Davis
- Written by: Marriott Edgar
- Based on: The Service Flat by Marriott Edgar
- Produced by: Thomas Charles Arnold
- Starring: Pat Paterson; Syd Crossley; Merle Tottenham
- Cinematography: Desmond Dickinson
- Production company: Thomas Charles Arnold Productions
- Distributed by: Producers Distributing Corporation
- Release date: 16 September 1932
- Running time: 64 minutes
- Country: United Kingdom
- Language: English

Here's George is a 1932 British comedy film directed by Redd Davis and featuring Pat Paterson, Syd Crossley and Merle Tottenham. It was adapted by Marriott Edgar from his play The Service Flat. It was shot at Cricklewood Studios as a quota quickie.

== Synopsis ==
George Muffitt is in love with Laura Wentworth. He tells her mother that he has found a flat, for himself and Laura after they are married. The flat is equipped with modern labour-saving gadgets, but when Mrs Wentworth arrives and he tries to demonstrate everything, he presses all the wrong buttons and chaos ensues.

== Cast ==
- George Clarke as George Muffitt
- Pat Paterson as Laura Wentworth
- Ruth Taylor as Mrs. Wentworth
- Marriott Edgar as Mr. Wentworth
- Syd Crossley as commissionaire
- Alfred Wellesley as tenant
- Merle Tottenham as Perkins
- Wally Patch as foreman
- Rene Ray as telephonist

== Reception ==
Kine Weekly wrote: "A rousing British comedy, with plenty of popular slapstick, which is staged with ingenuity and put over with whole-hearted enthusiasm by a good cast, headed by George Clarke, who is in his best form.... This comedy is reminiscent of the music-hall sketch, but it is suitably embellished and is presented with riotous ingenuity. ... The entire cast, from George Clarke downwards, take a lively interest in their job, and their spirited enthusiasm completes a refreshing British comedy which has all the promise of a popular success."

Picturegoer wrote: "George Clarke, of music-hall motor-car sketch fame, is at his best in this popular, if conventional slapstick entertainment. ... Good, clean fun of a typically British order which cannot but put you into a good mood however blue you may feel."

Picture Show wrote: "Fast moving, brightly directed. For sheer high-spirited fun, this is one of the best British comedies ever turned out."
