= Suspected Person =

1942 film by Lawrence Huntington

- Directed by: Lawrence Huntington
- Written by: Lawrence Huntington
- Produced by: Warwick Ward
- Starring: Clifford Evans; Patricia Roc; David Farrar; Robert Beatty
- Cinematography: Ronald Anscombe; Günther Krampf
- Edited by: Flora Newton
- Music by: Guy Jones
- Production company: Associated British
- Distributed by: Pathé Pictures International (UK); Producers Releasing Corporation (US)
- Release date: June 1942
- Running time: 78 minutes
- Country: United Kingdom
- Language: English

Suspected Person is a 1942 British second feature ('B') drama film directed and written by Lawrence Huntington and starring Clifford Evans, Patricia Roc and David Farrar. The film was made at Welwyn Studios by Associated British. It was released in the United States in 1944 by Producers Releasing Corporation.

== Synopsis ==
A British associate of some American gangsters double-crosses them following a bank robbery and escapes with the loot. He heads to London where his sister keeps a boarding house. She is unaware of his criminal career, but becomes suspicious when both Scotland Yard and his former associates both turn up on his trail.

== Cast ==
- Clifford Evans as Jim Raynor
- Patricia Roc as Joan Raynor
- David Farrar as Inspector Thompson
- Anne Firth as Carol
- Robert Beatty as Franklin
- Eric Clavering as Dolan
- Leslie Perrins as Tony Garrett
- Eliot Makeham as Davis
- John Salew as Jones
- William Hartnell as Saunders
- Martin Benson
- Terry Conlin
- Anthony Shaw

== Reception ==
The Monthly Film Bulletin wrote: "One of the best-made British thrillers of late. The sets are noticeably well dressed, even if the apartment house seems amazing value for the small price charged for a room, and the production and lighting are admirable. Patricia Roc gives an adequate performance as Joan and Anne Firth is charming as Carol. There is excellent acting from David Farrar as Thompson, Clifford Evans as Jim, and admirable cameos from Elliot Makeham as the fence, and John Salew as Jones the pub owner. The direction is slick, the suspense and excitement being well sustained."

Kine Weekly wrote: "A romantic crime play, the tale takes a litile time to develop, but the characterisation and atmosphere are at all times good. Its feminine appeal is strong. Clifford Evans is good as a reporter."

In The British 'B' Film’ Steve Chibnall and Brian McFarlane called the film: "competently made, but ultimately dull, gangster yarn."

In British Sound Films: The Studio Years 1928–1959 David Quinlan rated the film as "good", writing: "Smartly made suspense thriller."
