= Merle Tottenham =

British actress (1901–1958)

- in Bank Holiday (1938)
- Born: 22 January 1901; Quetta; British India
- Died: 18 July 1958 (aged 57); Bexhill, East Sussex; United Kingdom
- Occupations: Stage actor Film actor
- Years active: 1925 –1950

Merle Tottenham (22 January 1901 – 18 July 1958) was a British stage and film actress. Her stage work included the original West End production of Noël Coward's Cavalcade in 1931; and she reprised her role as Annie the servant in the subsequent Hollywood film, in 1933. She also appeared as Dora, the maid in Night Must Fall (1937) with Robert Montgomery and Rosalind Russell, and the film version of Coward's This Happy Breed (1944), as Edie, the maid.

== Partial filmography ==
- Immediate Possession (1931, Short) - Polly Baxter
- Down Our Street (1932) - Rose
- Here's George (1932) - Perkins
- Cavalcade (1933) - Annie
- Bondage (1933) - Ruth
- Paddy the Next Best Thing (1933) - Maid
- The Invisible Man (1933) - Millie
- The Night Club Queen (1934) - Alice Lamont
- Borrowed Clothes (1934) - Minor Role (uncredited)
- Youthful Folly (1934)
- Sporting Love (1936) - Maid
- Chick (1936) - Maid
- The Man in the Mirror (1936) - Mary (uncredited)
- Night Must Fall (1937) - Dora
- Bank Holiday (1938) - Milly
- Over the Moon (1939) - Maid (uncredited)
- Dead Men Are Dangerous (1939) - Gladys
- A Girl Must Live (1939) - College inmate
- Goodbye, Mr. Chips (1939) - Nellie, maid to Mr & Mrs Chipping (uncredited)
- Poison Pen (1939) - Mrs. Kemp
- The Young Mr. Pitt (1942) - Maid at Lord Auckland's (uncredited)
- We Dive at Dawn (1943) - (uncredited)
- Headline (1943) - Mrs. Deans
- This Happy Breed (1944) - Edie
- Love Story (1944) - Bus Conductoress (uncredited)
- I Didn't Do It (1945) - Tessie
- Caravan (1946) - Tweeny (uncredited)
- My Brother Jonathan (1948) - Alice Rudge
- Calling Paul Temple (1948) - Millie
- The Weaker Sex (1948) - Woman in Fish Queue (uncredited)
- Sleeping Car to Trieste (1948) - Miss Smith (uncredited)
- It's Hard to Be Good (1948) - Mrs. Hobson (uncredited)
- The Twenty Questions Murder Mystery (1950) - Mrs. Tavy's Neighbour (uncredited)
- Room to Let (1950) - Alice
- The Woman in Question (1950) - Neighbour (uncredited) (final film role)
