= Two Letter Alibi =

1962 British film by Robert Lynn

- Directed by: Robert Lynn
- Written by: Paul Winterton (novel); Roger Marshall
- Produced by: E.M. Smedley-Aston
- Starring: Peter Williams; Petra Davies; Ursula Howells
- Cinematography: Ken Hodges
- Edited by: Lee Doig
- Music by: Wilfred Josephs
- Production company: Playpont Films
- Distributed by: British Lion Films
- Release date: 28 May 1962
- Running time: 57 minutes
- Country: United Kingdom
- Language: English

Two Letter Alibi is a 1962 British second feature ('B') crime film directed by Robert Lynn and starring Peter Williams, Petra Davies and Ursula Howells. It was written by Paul Winterton and Roger Marshall based on Winterton's 1953 novel Death and the Sky Above.

== Plot ==
Charles Hilary wants a divorce from his alcoholic wife Louise so he can marry television personality Kathy Forrester, but Louise refuses. When Louise is found murdered, the circumstantial evidence points to Charles, who is arrested and convicted. Convinced that Charles is innocent, Kathy enlists the help of retired Police Commissioner Sir John Fawcett to investigate the case. They find the real murderer and Charles is released.

== Cast ==
- Peter Williams as Charles Hilary
- Petra Davies as Kathy Forrester
- Ursula Howells as Louise Hilary
- Ronald Adam as Sir John Fawcett
- Stratford Johns as Bates
- Peter Howell as Carlton
- Bernard Archard as Duke
- Walter Brown as Mark Richards
- Arnold Diamond as ballistics expert
- David Morrell as Detective Sergeant Day
- Cavan Malone as Bob, researcher
- Stafford Byrne as clerk of court
- Reginald Marsh as Salcombe
- Geoffrey Chater as Inspector Warren
- Peter Bathurst as police doctor
- William Sherwood as prison doctor
- Piers Keelan as Brockton
- Hedger Wallace as prison officer
- Garfield Morgan as foreman of the jury

== Production ==
It was made at Shepperton Studios with sets designed by the art director George Provis.

== Release ==
The film was distributed on the Odeon Circuit on a double-bill with Walk on the Wild Side (1962).

== Critical reception ==
The Monthly Film Bulletin wrote: "A routine but economic "B" thriller, this is straightforward both in plot and style. Ursula Howells, as usual these days, portrays an unsympathetic character, who is murdered ten minutes after the opening."
