= Q Planes =

1939 film by Tim Whelan and Arthur B. Woods

- British quad cinema lobby card poster
- Directed by: Tim Whelan; Arthur B. Woods
- Written by: Brock Williams; Jack Whittingham; Ian Dalrymple
- Produced by: Irving Asher; Executive producer: Alexander Korda
- Starring: Laurence Olivier; Valerie Hobson; Ralph Richardson
- Cinematography: Harry Stradling Sr.
- Edited by: Hugh Stewart
- Music by: Muir Mathieson
- Color process: Black and white
- Production company: Irving Asher Productions
- Distributed by: Columbia Pictures; (UK, US)
- Release date: 2 March 1939
- Running time: 82 minutes
- Country: United Kingdom
- Language: English
- Budget: £67,502

Q Planes (known as Clouds Over Europe in the United States) is a 1939 British comedy spy film starring Ralph Richardson, Laurence Olivier and Valerie Hobson. Olivier and Richardson were a decade into their fifty-year friendship and were in the process of staging a theatrical version of Othello, with Richardson in the title role and Olivier as Iago, when this film was made.

Q Planes was produced by Irving Asher, an American, with British film impresario Alexander Korda as executive producer. The film was directed by an American, Tim Whelan (Sidewalks of London, and later in 1940, co-director of The Thief of Bagdad), who had lived in Britain since 1932, working for Korda at Denham Studios.

== Plot ==
In September 1938, advanced British aircraft prototypes carrying experimental and secret equipment are vanishing with their crews on test flights. No one can fathom why, not even spymaster Major Hammond or his sister Kay, a newspaper reporter, who is working undercover in the works canteen at the Barrett & Ward Aircraft Company.

At first, Major Hammond is seen as an outsider at the aircraft factory, especially by Mr. Barrett, the owner, who is working under a government contract. Hammond soon finds a friend in star pilot, Tony McVane, who helps him try to solve the case. Hammond becomes convinced that Jenkins, the company secretary at the factory, is a mole but Jenkins is killed by a gunman firing from a moving car before he can give up the names of his contacts.

Tony returns to the aircraft factory, determined to make the next test flight. His aircraft, like the others, is brought down by a powerful ray from a mysterious salvage ship, S.S. Viking. (Although the nationality of the crew and agents aboard the ship is only implied, it was understood by audiences that "All of the crew speak with German accents and little doubt is left who the villains are", wrote Variety.)

The aircraft, Tony and the crew are taken on board Viking, where he discovers many other missing airmen who have suffered the same fate. Escaping from their prison, Tony leads them in an attempt to take control of the ship, gathering up weapons as they go. In London, Major Hammond learns the truth and directs a Royal Navy ship (HMS Echo) to go to their rescue. Kay and Tony form a relationship, while Hammond, who because of his job, has repeatedly cancelled plans with his lady friend, eventually meets her only to learn that she has married someone else.

== Cast ==
Film roles identified by order in the credits.

- Laurence Olivier as Tony McVane
- Ralph Richardson as Major Charles Hammond
- Valerie Hobson as Kay Hammond
- George Curzon as Jenkins
- George Merritt as Barrett
- Gus McNaughton as Bleinkinsop
- David Tree as R. MacKenzie
- Sandra Storme as Daphne
- Hay Petrie as Stage Door Keeper
- Frank Fox as Karl
- George Butler as Sir Marshall Gosport
- Gordon McLeod as The Baron
- John Longden as John Peters
- Ronald Adam as Pollock, Airline Designer
- Ian Fleming as Air Minister
- Reginald Purdell as Pilot
- Roy Emerton as SS Viking First Mate
- David Farrar as SS Viking Mate
- John Laurie as Newspaper Editor
- Gertrude Musgrove as Barmaid
- Raymond Lovell as Company Manager
- Leslie Bradley as Assistant

== Production ==
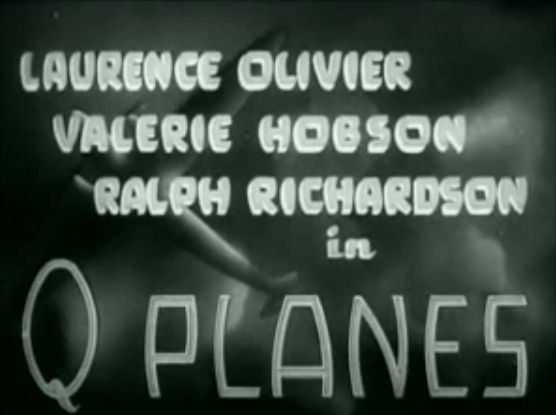
Intertitle for Q Planes

The film's working title was Foreign Sabotage. Period airports and aircraft including the Airspeed Envoy, de Havilland Dragon Rapide and de Havilland Tiger Moth are featured in the aerial scenes. The Brooklands racetrack, which was also an important airfield, was used as a backdrop for the sequences on the ground. Written and produced in September 1938, Q Planes was a quick project for Olivier, already bound for America and the filming of Wuthering Heights (1939). Richardson, who had encouraged Olivier to take the role of Heathcliff with his famous advice, "Bit of fame. Good.", was always better at comedy and dominates much of the screen, with a sardonic performance as a spy, either working for Scotland Yard or British Military Intelligence. Q Planes is historically interesting for its contrast to later British war films and to Olivier's later film career. The film might be called the last of the "neutral Britain" spy comedies, which Hitchcock had pioneered in The 39 Steps (1935) and The Lady Vanishes (1938). The tone of Q Planes blends a spy thriller with high-tech villains, sophisticated romance and rapid-fire comedy. The British later excelled at this genre in the James Bond films from the 1960s (Jack Whittingham co-wrote Thunderball [1965]) but here the comedic aspects are in contrast to the ardent, patriotic, sombre films that the British made once the Second World War began and the Germans, under Hitler, began to conquer Europe.

== Reception ==
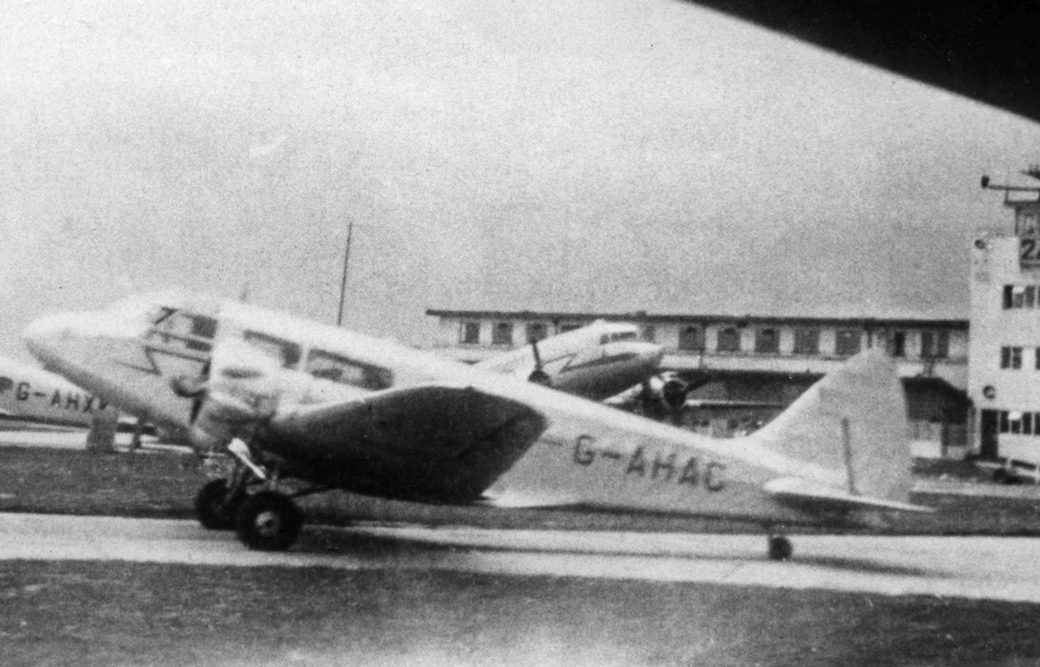
Airspeed Envoy

Q Planes was released in the U.S. as Clouds Over Europe, on 30 June 1939. Despite its subject, Q Planes is mainly a comedy, "a sort of Thin Man in an espionage setting", wrote Picturegoer. The film received positive reviews, with much of its success due to Ralph Richardson, who cleverly held together the comedy and dramatic elements as Major Hammond. Kinematograph Weekly described Q Planes as "rousing espionage, romantic melodrama, staged in the best happy-go-lucky but pukka British tradition". C. A. Lejeune called the film "a bright, vigorous little picture, and Mr. Richardson's Major is the brightest thing in it. You should see it. You'll like it. It has savour". Leslie Halliwell called it a "lively, lovely thriller distinguished by a droll leading performance.

Dilys Powell wrote of Olivier that she recalled "being surprised that the actor made so slight an impression" and described him as "dashing but undistinguished". For Olivier scholars and fans, Q Planes shows the dramatic difference his subsequent American work with Wyler and Hitchcock made on his film acting. Here, Olivier is at the height of the glib, self-conscious acting style of the 15 pictures he had made before his work with Wyler. Olivier wrote that it was only then that he learned to stop condescending to pictures as a mere paycheck between Shakespeare productions and instead master acting for the camera as its own form.

The New York Times film critic Frank S. Nugent was initially put off by the film's new opening which, unlike the British release, reflected an ever-darkening scenario of war with Nazi Germany. Hoping to impress this on their reluctant American cousins, the executive producer Korda was Churchill's designated producer, in the filmic aspect of de-neutralising America. The film began with "shots of Commons, Parliament, the War Office, the India Office, No. 10 Downing Street and other imposing edifices", as described by Nugent. "As an added touch of dignity and authority, a commentator's voice noted each building as it passed, spoke gravely of the burden of empire, of trade and population statistics, and of the might and wisdom of Britain's leaders …" Nugent expressed relief when this made-for-America preamble turns into the British comedy it originally was and praised it as "one of the wittiest and pleasantest comedies that have come a capering to the American screen this season".

Variety regarded the newsreel-style introduction as one of the film's "unusual, deft slants" and praised the film as an "excellent summer diversion.… Columbia has an easy winner in Clouds Over Europe which, despite the solemnity of its title, is strictly for comedy, albeit with a hint or two of anti-German propaganda tucked away". While noting the matinee value of Olivier, Variety reported that "the acting honors go — and at a gallop — to Ralph Richardson, playing a Scotland Yard eccentric". Variety reviewers also considered it had a "refreshing tongue-in-cheek attitude… Whole thing is bright, breezy and flavorsome". Less impressed was film critic John Mosher of The New Yorker, who found in the film "a bigger allotment of very British small talk and that special brand of British whimsy which makes us here think at times that at least one of the clouds over England is this particular kind of humour".

== Influence ==
Richardson's dapper, insouciant secret agent was named, years later, as the model for the bowler-hatted upper-class British spy John Steed in the 1960s television series The Avengers, according to producer Brian Clemens.

== Home media ==
Q Planes was released on video by Carlton Home Entertainment in 1991 and on DVD in April 2007.
