= All Over the Town =

1949 British film by Derek N. Twist

- Original film poster
- Directed by: Derek N. Twist
- Screenplay by: Michael Gordon; Derek N. Twist
- Based on: All Over the Town by R. F. Delderfield
- Produced by: Ian Dalrymple; Michael Gordon
- Starring: Norman Wooland; Sarah Churchill; Cyril Cusack; Ronald Adam
- Cinematography: C. M. Pennington-Richards
- Edited by: Sidney Stone
- Music by: Temple Abady
- Production companies: Wessex Film Productions; Pinewood Films
- Release date: 2 March 1949
- Running time: 83 minutes
- Country: United Kingdom
- Language: English

All Over the Town is a 1949 British comedy film directed by Derek N. Twist and starring Norman Wooland, Sarah Churchill and Cyril Cusack. It was written by Michael Gordon and Twist based on the 1947 novel by R. F. Delderfield.

== Plot ==
After serving in the RAF during the Second World War, Nat Hearn returns to his pre-war job as a reporter on the Tormouth Clarion. He meets and is attracted to Sally Thorpe, who had replaced him when he enlisted and has been given notice now that he has returned. He arranges for her to be kept on, and they spend time together and become engaged to be married.

Later, Nat becomes a co-owner and editor of the paper, but the other co-owner disagrees with Nat's new editorial policy, which often involves upsetting people who provide the paper with much of its advertising revenue. The co-owner arranges for most of the staff to take holiday time off simultaneously to prevent Nat's opposition to Tormouth Council's proposed redevelopment scheme, from which some councillors plan to profit personally. Despite this, at a public meeting called by the council Nat and his small band of supporters manage to convince the locals to support Nat in the dispute.

== Cast ==
- Norman Wooland as Nat Hearn
- Sarah Churchill as Sally Thorpe
- Cyril Cusack as Gerald Vane
- Ronald Adam as Sam Vane
- Bryan Forbes as Trumble
- James Hayter as Baines
- Fabia Drake as Miss Gelding
- John Salew as Sleek
- Stanley Baker as Barnes
- Edward Rigby as Grimmett
- Patrick Doonan as Burton
- Eleanor Summerfield as Beryl Hopper
- Trefor Jones as Tenor
- Sandra Dorne as Marlene
- Hubert Leslie as Skinner
- Henry Edwards as Major Martindale
- Frederick Leister as Wainer
- Patrick Macnee as Mr Vince
- Anthony Oliver as PC Butt
- Erik Chitty as Frobisher
- Walter Horsbrugh as Mr Thornton
- Lydia Bilbrook as Mrs Vane (uncredited)

== Production ==
All Over the Town was the fourth of five films produced by Wessex Film Productions, a production company founded in 1947 by Ian Dalrymple and Jack Lee, both formerly of the Crown Film Unit. The film was shot in Lyme Regis.

== Reception ==
The Monthly Film Bulletin wrote: "The acting for the most part is good, but not outstanding. The satirical comedy and humour are good. Direction and production are adequate and the film has an exciting climax and satisfying ending."

The New York Times described it as a "slow, dogmatic little picture" with a "dog-eared" plot.

According to the review in The Times (London), the film's plot was unoriginal, executed "without inspiration or any originality of thought".

== Later history ==
By the beginning of the 21st century the only known surviving copy of the film was the negative at the BFI National Film and Television Archive. In 2005 the Lyme Regis Film Society commissioned the production of a new print from the negative. This copy of the film is housed in Lyme Regis Museum and was shown at the local Regent Cinema on a few occasions before it burned down in 2016. Since 2018 the film has been shown on the UK television channel Talking Pictures TV.
