= Elwyn Brook-Jones =

British actor (1911–1962)

- in TV's Garry Halliday
- Born: 11 December 1911
- Died: 4 September 1962 (aged 50); Reading, Berkshire, England
- Occupations: Actor; Pianist
- Years active: 1922–1962

Elwyn Brook-Jones (11 December 1911 – 4 September 1962) was a British theatre, film and television actor.

== Early life ==
According to his obituary in The Times, Brook-Jones was born in Sarawak on the island of Borneo; however, other sources place his birth in Caerphilly, Wales. The Times further asserts that he was educated at Jesus College, Oxford; however, the College has no record of his attendance under that name to support this claim.

His public debut was in Australia, aged 11, as a concert pianist; he later made cabaret appearances in the US and the Far East.

== Career ==
Brook-Jones was a repertory actor, first appearing in London in 1943 in Hedda Gabler as Judge Brack, before going on to appear in many productions in the West End, films and television.

In the BBC children's series Garry Halliday, Brook-Jones was the hero's opponent "The Voice". He played Tober in Carol Reed's Odd Man Out (1947). He was also Gladwin in Michael Powell and Emeric Pressburger's The Small Back Room (1949) and the Emir in The Pure Hell of St Trinian's (1960).

== Death ==
Brook-Jones died in Reading, Berkshire, aged 50.

== Selected filmography ==
=== Film ===
- Odd Man Out (1947)
- The Three Weird Sisters (1948)
- Good-Time Girl (1948)
- Bonnie Prince Charlie (1948)
- It's Hard to Be Good (1948)
- Dear Mr. Prohack (1949)
- The Wonder Kid (1950)
- I'll Get You for This (1951)
- Life in Her Hands (1951)
- Judgment Deferred (1952)
- The Night Won't Talk (1952) as Martin Soames
- Three Steps in the Dark (1953)
- The Harassed Hero (1954) as Logan (credited as Elwyn Brook Jones)
- Beau Brummell (1954) as Mr. Tupp (uncredited)
- The Gilded Cage (1955)
- Assignment Redhead (1956)
- Rogue's Yarn (1957) as Inspector Walker
- The Duke Wore Jeans (1958)
- Passport to Shame (1958)
- The Ugly Duckling (1959)

=== Television ===
- The Schirmer Inheritance (1957) as Colonel Chrysantos
- Television Playwright (1958) as Mr. Pheeming (episode "Call Me a Liar")
- Ivanhoe (1958) as Sir Wendell (episode "Counterfeit")
- Saturday Playhouse (1958) as The Duke of Lamorre (episode "The Duke in Darkness")
- The Four Just Men (1959) as Scheye (episode "The Deadly Capsule")
- Dial 999 (1959) as Mr. Scott (episode "Ghost Squad")
- Garry Halliday (1959-1962) as The Voice (38 episodes)
- The Larkins (1960) as Professor Masterson (episode "Well Turned Worm")
- Richard the Lionheart (1962-1963) as Tancred, King of Sicily / Count Rolf ( 4 episodes)
