= The Hundred Pound Window =

- Directed by: Brian Desmond Hurst
- Written by: Brock Williams; Rodney Ackland (additional dialogue)
- Story by: Mark Hellinger
- Based on: a screenplay by Abem Finkel
- Starring: Anne Crawford; David Farrar; Frederick Leister
- Cinematography: Otto Heller
- Music by: Hans May
- Production company: Warner Brothers-First National Productions
- Distributed by: Warner Bros. (UK)
- Release date: 3 April 1944 (UK)
- Running time: 84 minutes
- Country: United Kingdom
- Language: English
- Budget: £64,464
- Box office: £54,748

The Hundred Pound Window is a 1944 British comedy crime film directed by Brian Desmond Hurst and starring Anne Crawford, David Farrar, Frederick Leister and Richard Attenborough. It was written by Brock Williams, Rodney Ackland and Mark Hellinger, based on a screenplay by Abem Finkel. An accountant has to take a second job working at a racetrack, where he soon becomes mixed up with a shady crowd.

== Plot ==
Ernest Draper is an upstanding hard-working clerk. After being posted to man the £100 bet window at a racetrack, he celebrates but loses heavily at roulette. By chance he recoups his losses and gets involved with a group of villains whom he exposes as black marketeers.

== Cast ==
- Anne Crawford as Joan Draper
- David Farrar as George Graham
- Frederick Leister as Ernest Draper
- Mary Clare as Millie Draper
- Richard Attenborough as Tommy Draper
- Niall MacGinnis as Chick Slater
- David Hutcheson as Steve Halligan
- Claud Allister as Hon. Freddie
- Claude Bailey as John D. Humphries
- Hazel Bray as Cabaret Singer
- Peter Gawthorne as Van Rayden
- Anthony Hawtrey as Evans
- David Horne as Baldwin
- Francis Lister as Capt. Johnson
- Ruby Miller as Mrs. Remington
- Brefni O'Rorke as Kennedy
- John Salew as Walker
- John Slater as O'Neil
- C. Denier Warren as Blodgett

== Production ==
It was shot at Teddington Studios, the home of Warner Brothers's British subsidiary.

== Reception ==
The Monthly Film Bulletin wrote: "Director Hurst has made a bright slick comedy from a strong story ... in which the numerous twists of plot and incident are never allowed to become tortuous. Freely mixing exteriors and a wide variety of sets, he makes the most of contrast between home life, the city, the racecourse and 'crook' night life. To admirable casting he adds painstaking characterisation which wins from all his actors – a long list – an unusually high standard of work."

Picturegoer wrote: "Best thing in this picture which it is hard to believe was directed by a man of the capability of Brian Desmond Hurst, is the acting of Frederick Leister as a clerk. In spite of the fact that he is made to appear too simple, he does present a sound characterization."

Variety wrote: "Slickness of plot development suggests a faithful following of the original American script by Abem Finkel, but in every detail incident and atmosphere is as English as the Derby. ... With due consideration to wartime difficulties the casting of this one is little short of a triumph for the Warners' Teddington studio, even the smallest of the bits being filled perfectly. ... Direction by Brian Desmond Hurst, coupled with more than usually effective editing, keeps the story moving with a smooth swiftness all too rare in English movies."

Leslie Halliwell wrote "Routine programmer notable only forgiving a leading role to an old character actor."

== See also ==
- List of films about horse racing
