= Garry Halliday =

- Starring: Terence Longdon; Terence Alexander; Elwyn Brook-Jones; Bill Kerr; Maurice Kaufmann
- Country of origin: United Kingdom
- No. of episodes: 50

Production
- Running time: 25mins

Original release
- Network: BBC Television
- Release: 1959 – 1962

Garry Halliday is a British television series for children on the BBC from 1959 to 1962. The show starred Terence Longdon as airman Garry Halliday. The series was credited to the writer 'Justin Blake': this was in fact a pseudonym for the scriptwriters John Griffith Bowen and Jeremy Bullmore, who also wrote some novelisations of the Garry Halliday TV stories under the same name.

== Plot ==
Reminiscent of Biggles, Halliday was a pilot for a commercial airline, Halliday Charter Company, and flew to his adventures in an aircraft with the call sign Golf Alpha Oboe Roger George. He was assisted by co-pilot Bill Dodds, played by Terence Alexander, who was later Charlie in Bergerac. The airline's control base station was Lima Foxtrot.

Their enemy was The Voice, played by Elwyn Brook-Jones, so called because he was never seen by other characters, so that at the end of each series he could escape and reappear in the next. Invisible even to his own gang, The Voice at first remained behind a two-way mirror to disguise his identity; later he used closed-circuit television.

== Production ==
During the run of the series actor Bill Kerr, playing new co-pilot character Eddie Robbins, replaced Terence Alexander. Maurice Kaufmann played one of The Voice's henchmen. In early 1962 Brook-Jones fell ill and could not take part in the series, necessitating his replacement as The Voice for several episodes by Hamlyn Benson. Although Brook-Jones did subsequently return to the role, his death in September 1962 meant that The Voice was written out of a planned appearance in the programme's final episode that month.

Location filming took place at Ferryfield Airport in Lydd, Kent, with the offices and planes of Silver City Airways transformed for the first few serials. For later runs, flying and airport sequences were credited to Skyways Ltd and finally to British United Air Ferries. For that final series, star Langdon co-wrote one of the episodes; this final run consisted of each episode being a stand-alone individual story in and of itself, rather than the serialised format the programme had previously employed.

Only one episode survives in the BBC archives.

== In popular culture ==
Garry Halliday makes an appearance in The Black Dossier by Alan Moore, his name slightly altered to Gary Haliday, encountering Mina Murray and Allan Quatermain in a new spaceport in Birmingham. The Voice is mentioned in passing in a fictional document detailing The League's activities during World War II (When They Sound The Last All Clear).
