= Anne Crawford =

British actress (1920–1956)

- Born: Imelda Anne Crawford; 22 November 1920; Haifa, Palestine
- Died: 17 October 1956 (aged 35); London, England
- Resting place: St Mary's Catholic Cemetery, Kensal Green
- Occupation: Film actress
- Years active: 1938–1956
- Spouse: Wallace Douglas (m. 1953)

Imelda Anne Crawford (22 November 1920 – 17 October 1956) was a British film actress.

== Biography ==
Crawford was born in Palestine to a Scottish father and an English mother and brought up in Edinburgh. On the advice of Alastair Sim, she attended the Royal Academy of Dramatic Art.

A contemporary of Margaret Lockwood and Phyllis Calvert's, Crawford is best remembered for her roles in women's pictures of the 1940s, such as Millions Like Us (1943), Two Thousand Women (1944), and They Were Sisters (1945).

She married Wallace Douglas in 1953 and died of leukemia in a London nursing home in 1956, aged 35. The Times, on 18 October 1956, reported that she was playing in Agatha Christie's The Spider's Web, at London's Savoy Theatre, when she became ill. After acting in a stage production of The Gift, about a scientist blinded by an accident, she added a codicil to her will leaving her eyes to the International Eye Bank.

== Filmography ==
=== Film ===
Year	Title	Role	Notes
1938	Prison Without Bars		
1942	They Flew Alone	ATA Girl	AKA, Wings and the Woman
1943	The Peterville Diamond	Teri Mortimer	
1943	Millions Like Us	Jennifer Knowles	
1943	The Dark Tower	Mary	
1943	Headline	Anne	
1943	The Night Invader	Karen Lindley	
1944	The Hundred Pound Window	Joan Draper	
1944	Two Thousand Women	Margaret Long	
1945	They Were Sisters	Vera Sargeant	
1946	Caravan	Oriana	
1946	Bedelia	Ellen	
1947	The Master of Bankdam	Anne Pickersgill	
1947	Night Beat	Julie Kendall	
1948	Daughter of Darkness	Bess Stanforth	
1948	The Blind Goddess	Helen Brasted	
1948	It's Hard to Be Good	Mary Leighton	
1948	Miranda	Lady Marten	
1950	Tony Draws a Horse	Clare Fleming	
1950	Trio	Mrs. Ramsey	Segment: "Mr. Know-All"
1951	Thunder on the Hill	Isabel Jeffreys	
1953	Street Corner	Susan	AKA, Both Sides of the Law
1953	Knights of the Round Table	Morgan le Fay	
1954	Mad About Men	Barbara Davenport	

=== Television ===
Year	Title	Role	Notes
1946	After Dinner	Laina Penrose	TV film
1948	Reunion	Sophy Ross	TV film
1949	Lady Audley's Secret	Alicia Audley	TV film
1950–51	Repertory Theatre	Theresa, Margaret Fuller	Episodes: "The Gambler", "Let Them Be Sea Captains"
1953	Strictly Personal	Diana Wilson	TV series
1954	Douglas Fairbanks Presents	Laura Barrie	Episode: "Pattern for Glory"
1954	The Six Proud Walkers	Polly Arden	TV series
1954	Out of Bounds	Sophie Garnett	TV short
1954–55	Sunday Night Theatre	Jill Manning, Stella Tabret, Carol Lindsay	Episodes: "Waiting for Gillian", "The Sacred Flame", "The Leader of the House"
1955	The Mulberry Accelerator	Polly Arden	TV series (six episodes, continuing the story of TV-family The Walkers, first appearing in 'The Six Proud Walkers').
1956	Opportunity Murder	Vera Lewis	TV series
