= Frederick Leister =

English actor (1885–1970)

- Born: Frederick Charles Holloway; 1 December 1885; London, England
- Died: 24 August 1970 (aged 84); London, England
- Occupation: Actor
- Years active: 1906–1961
- Spouse: Dora Luther (m. 1911; died 1954)
- Children: 1

Frederick Leister (1 December 1885 – 24 August 1970), was an English actor. He began his career in musical comedy and after serving in the First World War he played character roles in modern West End plays and in classic drama. He appeared in more than 60 films between 1922 and 1961.

== Life and career ==
Leister was born Frederick Charles Holloway in London, the son of George Leister Holloway and his wife Mary Ann King Holloway, née Le Capelain. He was educated at Dulwich and Worthing Grammar School. He was intended for a career as a lawyer and served his time as an articled clerk to a solicitor's firm. He made his stage debut at the Crown Theatre, Peckham, in 1906 in the chorus of A Country Girl and spent the next six years touring in musical comedies. He made his London debut at the Prince's Theatre in February 1913 and appeared in supporting roles at the Lyceum and the Duke of York's until 1915, when he joined the army. He served as a lieutenant in the Royal Garrison Artillery, entering France in September 1917. In 1911, he married Dora Luther. They had one daughter together, Jean. In 1929, he and Dora changed their name to Leister, by deed poll. Dora died in 1954, aged 64.

For the rest of his acting career Leister divided his time between the classics and lighter pieces such as detective plays and drawing room comedy, with occasional excursions into musical comedy. His classic roles included Falstaff in The Merry Wives of Windsor (1919), Faulconbridge in King John (1920), Pavel Lebedyev in Ivanov (1950) and Peter Nikolayavich in The Seagull (1953). He played the Emperor in The White Horse Inn at the London Coliseum in 1931. In modern plays two of his longest-running engagements were as Maxwell Davenport in The Late Christopher Bean (1933–34) and as Charles Donkin, the central figure in Ian Hay's comedy Housemaster (1936–37). He appeared on Broadway in the same role in 1938, when the play was retitled Bachelor Born. In 1944 he featured in the West End hit play No Medals by Esther McCracken. In 1956 he appeared in the thriller Towards Zero by Agatha Christie at the St James's Theatre.

== Filmography ==
- The Glorious Adventure (1922) as A Knight/Courtier (film debut) (uncredited)
- The Message (1930, Short) as Inspector Hudson
- Bracelets (1931) as Slim Symes
- Dreyfus (1931) as Edgar Demange
- Down River (1931) as Inspector Manning
- The World, the Flesh, the Devil (1932) as Sir James Hall
- Evensong (1934) as Emperor Franz Josef
- The Iron Duke (1934) as King of Prussia
- Whom the Gods Love (1936) as Emperor
- O.H.M.S. (1937) as Vice Consul
- The Show Goes On (1937) as O.B. Dalton
- King Solomon's Mines (1937) as Diamond Buyer (uncredited)
- Dinner at the Ritz (1937) as Tarade
- Sixty Glorious Years (1938) as H. H. Asquith
- The Outsider (1939) as Joseph Sturdee
- Goodbye, Mr. Chips (1939) as Marsham
- On the Night of the Fire (1939) as Inspector
- The Prime Minister (1941) as Lord Melbourne
- Spellbound as Mr. Vincent (AKA ' Passing Clouds '. Released as ' The Spell of Amy Nugent ', in USA)
- Atlantic Ferry (1941) as James Morison
- The Next of Kin (1942) as Colonel
- The Young Mr. Pitt (1942) as Lord Auckland (uncredited)
- We'll Meet Again (1943) as Mr. Hatropp
- The Gentle Sex (1943) as Colonel Lawrence
- Dear Octopus (1943) as Charles Randolph
- The Shipbuilders (1943) as Mr. Villier
- The Hundred Pound Window (1944) as Ernest Draper
- One Exciting Night (1944) as Hampton
- Kiss the Bride Goodbye (1945) as Captain Blood
- The Agitator (1945) as Mark Overend
- The Captive Heart (1946) as Mr. Mowbray
- So Well Remembered (1947) as John Channing
- Mrs. Fitzherbert (1947) as Henry Errington
- Night Beat (1947) as Magistrate
- Escape (1948) as Judge
- Quartet (1948) as Prison Governor (segment "The Kite")
- Forbidden (1949) as Dr. Franklin
- All Over the Town (1949) as Wainer
- For Them That Trespass (1949) as The Vicar
- Paper Orchid (1949) as Walter Wibberley
- Dear Mr. Prohack (1949) as The Director General
- Landfall (1949) as Admiral
- Boys in Brown (1949) as Judge
- The Twenty Questions Murder Mystery (1950) as Police Commissioner
- The Astonished Heart (1950) as Vicar in Play (voice, uncredited)
- The Rossiter Case (1951) as Sir James Ferguson
- Green Grow the Rushes (1951) as Col. Gill
- The Crimson Pirate (1952) as Sebastian
- Circumstantial Evidence (1952) as Sir Edward Carteret
- Top Secret (1952) as Prime Minister
- Souls in Conflict (1954) as Rev. Alan Woodbridge
- Delayed Action (1954) as Sir Francis (uncredited)
- Before I Wake (1955) as Dr. Elder (U.S. title: Shadow of Fear)
- The End of the Affair (1955) as Dr. Collingwood
- The Dam Busters (1955) as Committee Member
- Footsteps in the Fog (1955) as Dr. Simpson
- The Time of His Life (1955) as Sir John Carter-Wilson
- Around the World in 80 Days (1956) as Reform Club Member (uncredited)
- Dangerous Exile (1957) as Capt. Andrew Ogden
- Rx Murder (1958) as Dr. Alexander
- Left Right and Centre (1959) as Dr. Rushall
- Cone of Silence (1960) as Sir Henry (uncredited)
- Surprise Package (1960) as Aide to King Pavel II (uncredited)
- The Naked Edge (1961) as Judge (final film)
