= Mary Mackenzie =

English actress (1922–1966)

- in Doctor in Love (1960)
- Born: 3 May 1922; Burnley, Lancashire, England
- Died: 20 September 1966 (aged 44); London, England
- Occupation: Actress
- Years active: 1946–1963

Mary Mackenzie (3 May 1922 – 20 September 1966) was an English actress. One of her earliest credited TV roles was in 1950 on BBC's Sunday Night Theatre, as Miriam in an adaptation of H. G. Wells' The History of Mr Polly, a role she returned to in the 1959 BBC serialization.

== Early and personal life ==
Mackenzie was born in Burnley, Lancashire, where she spent her early years. She died at the age of 44 in a car accident in London in 1966.

== Acting career ==
=== Television ===
- Ghost Squad (1963) as Gertrude in the Episode "Gertrude" (season 2, episode 16)
- Z-Cars (1963) as Martha Mather in the Episode "The Listeners" (season 2, episode 22)
- The History of Mr Polly (1959) as Miriam
- Sunday Night Theatre (1950) as Marjorie Radley in the episode "Miss Hargreaves"
- Sunday Night Theatre (1950) as Miriam in the Episode "The History of Mr Polly"

=== Film ===
- Wanted for Murder (1946) as first victim
- Lady in the Fog aka Scotland Yard Inspector (1952) as Marilyn Durant
- The Man Who Watched Trains Go By (1952) as Mrs. Lucas
- Stolen Face (1952) as Lily Conover, before surgery
- The Long Memory (1952) as Gladys
- Trouble in the Glen (1954) as Kate Carnoch
- Duel in the Jungle (1954) as junior secretary
- The Harassed Hero (1954) as Estelle Logan
- Cloak Without Dagger (1956) as Kyra Gabaine
- Yield to the Night (1956) as Matron
- A Question of Adultery (1958) as Nurse Parsons
- The Man Who Liked Funerals (1959) as Hester Waring
