= Ronald Adam (actor) =

British RAF officer, actor and theatre manager (1896–1979)

Ronald Adam OBE
- in Green for Danger (1946)
- Born: Ronald George Hinings Adams; 31 December 1896; Bromyard, Herefordshire, England
- Died: 28 March 1979 (aged 82); London, England
- Occupation: Actor
- Years active: 1914–1978
- Spouses: Tanzi Cutava Barozzi; Allyne Dorothy Franks
- Military career
- Allegiance: United Kingdom
- Branch: British Army (1914–c. 1917); Royal Flying Corps (c. 1917–1918); Royal Air Force (1918; 1939–1945)
- Service years: 1914–1918; 1939–1945
- Rank: Wing commander
- Service number: 76367
- Units: No. 18 Squadron; No. 44 Squadron; No. 73 Squadron
- Conflicts: World War I; World War II; Battle of Britain
- Awards: Officer of the Order of the British Empire

Ronald George Hinings Adams, OBE (31 December 1896 – 28 March 1979), known professionally as Ronald Adam, was a British officer of the Royal Flying Corps and Royal Air Force, an actor on stage and screen, and a successful theatre manager.

== Early life ==
Adam was born in Bromyard, Herefordshire, on 31 December 1896, the son of Blake Adams and his wife Mona Robin. His parents and grandparents were all in the theatrical profession. He was educated at University College School.

== First World War ==
When still only 17 years old, Adams volunteered to join the British Army on the outbreak of the First World War. On 2 December 1914, he was commissioned as a temporary second lieutenant in the 15th (Reserve) Battalion of the Middlesex Regiment. Adams soon transferred to the Royal Flying Corps (RFC) and served as an observer with No. 18 Squadron in France, before returning home to re-train as a pilot.

Once qualified as a pilot, Adams remained in Britain and flew Sopwith Camels with No. 44 Squadron on home defence duties. The squadron was based at Hainault Farm aerodrome in Essex and was pioneering the use of night-fighters against Zeppelin raids on London. He was then posted back to France, still on Sopwith Camels, to No. 73 Squadron, at Champien.

On 1 April 1918, the Royal Flying Corps amalgamated with the Royal Naval Air Service (RNAS) to become the Royal Air Force (RAF), but Adams had barely had time to get used to the new title before he was shot down, on 7 April 1918, near Villers-Bretonneux in Northern France, either by Hans Kirschstein, or possibly Manfred von Richthofen and captured. Adams was badly wounded in the engagement and on the evening of his capture he was visited by a German orderly who passed on the compliments of von Richthofen. Adams spent eight months in hospitals and prison camps before he was repatriated on 17 December 1918.

== Acting career ==
After the war, he trained as a chartered accountant, but his interest moved to theatre. He dropped the final "s" from his surname and adopted the stage name "Ronald Adam". From 1924 to 1926, he was engaged as manager for Leslie Henson and Dion Titheradge, and at the Little, His Majesty's, and Strand theatres. He entered on the management of the Embassy Theatre, in April 1932, with the production of Madame Pepita, and made over 150 new productions and revivals from 1932 to 1939. Thirty of his productions were transferred to various West End theatres, including Ten Minute Alibi, Close Quarters, The Dominant Sex, Professor Bernhardi and Judgment Day. He presented several plays on tour, and acted in many of them, both at the Embassy and on their transfer.

He made his film debut with Strange Boarders, The Drum (both 1938) and Too Dangerous to Live (1939). Meanwhile, he continued with live theatre. At the Old Vic in June 1939, he played Lord Stagmantle in The Ascent of F6 and at the Phoenix in November 1939, Judge Tsankov in Judgment Day. He was director of Howard and Wyndham's Repertory Seasons in Edinburgh and Glasgow, 1938–39.

== Second World War ==
On the outbreak of the Second World War, Adam rejoined the RAF as a pilot officer, eventually rising to the rank of wing commander and served from 1939 to 1945. During the Battle of Britain in the summer of 1940, he was a Fighter Controller for the Hornchurch sector. It was Adam's job to co-ordinate the fighter command interceptions by using data gathered by radar and ground observers and then to dispatch fighters to intercept. There exists brief film footage of him in this role and can often be seen in documentaries on the war in the air. Jeffrey Quill, the distinguished Spitfire test pilot on attachment to 65 Squadron at Hornchurch during the Battle of Britain, wrote of Adam: "Apart from being highly competent at the actual job, his voice had a quality of calm and unhesitating certainty. The contribution of such men to the outcome of the Battle of Britain was incalculable."

During the war, he continued to take part in films, for example as a German bomber chief in The Lion Has Wings (1939), as Mons. Besnard in At the Villa Rose (1940) and as Sir Charles Fawcett in The Foreman Went to France (1942).

== Postwar period ==
Adam was appointed an Officer of the Order of the British Empire (OBE) in 1946.

After 1946, he continued to act in live theatre. At the Garrick in March 1950, he played Mr. Gibb in Mr. Gillie. He made his Broadway debut in December 1951 in Antony and Cleopatra at the Ziegfeld Theatre. In 1954, he featured in William Douglas Home's comedy The Manor of Northstead in the West End.

His main activity at this stage, however, was in film and television. From 1946 to 1978, he took part in over 140 film or television productions. He portrayed the Group Controller in Angels One Five, a 1952 British war film about the Battle of Britain. Adam reprised his actual wartime role as a fighter controller.

== Selected filmography ==
- The Drum (1938) as Major Gregoff
- Strange Boarders (1938) as Barstow
- Kate Plus Ten (1938) as Police Chief
- Luck of the Navy (1938) as Enemy Ship's Captain (uncredited)
- Q Planes (1939) as Pollack – Aviation Engineer (uncredited)
- Inspector Hornleigh (1939) as Wittens, Pheasant Inn Manager
- Too Dangerous to Live (1939) as Murbridge / Wills
- The Missing People (1939) as Surtees
- The Lion Has Wings (1939) as German Bomber Chief
- Hell's Cargo (1939) as Capt. Dukes
- Meet Maxwell Archer (1940) as Nicolides
- At the Villa Rose (1940) as Mons. Besnard
- The Big Blockade (1942) as German businessman (uncredited)
- The Avengers (1942) as Daily Express Reporter in Phone Booth (uncredited)
- The Foreman Went to France (1942) as Sir Charles Fawcett Managing Director (uncredited)
- Escape to Danger (1943) as George Merrick
- Journey Together (1945) as Commanding Officer at Falcon Field
- Pink String and Sealing Wax (1945) as Clerk of the Court
- Green for Danger (1946) as Dr. White
- Take My Life (1947) as Det Sgt Hawkins. (Deaf Man.) (uncredited)
- The Phantom Shot (1947) as Caleb Horder
- Fame Is the Spur (1947) as Radshaws' Doctor (uncredited)
- An Ideal Husband (1947) as Member of Parliament (uncredited)
- Counterblast (1948) as Col Ingram, Gillington POW Camp Commandant
- Bonnie Prince Charlie (1948) as Macleod
- The Case of Charles Peace (1949) as Counsel for Defence
- All Over the Town (1949) as Sam Vane
- That Dangerous Age (1949) as Prosecutor
- The Bad Lord Byron (1949) as Judge
- Christopher Columbus (1949) as Talavera
- Helter Skelter (1949) as Director General of the BBC (uncredited)
- Obsession (1949) as Clubman #1
- Black Magic (1949) as Court President
- Under Capricorn (1949) as Mr. Riggs
- Diamond City (1949) as Robert Southey
- Boys in Brown (1949) as Judge (uncredited)
- My Daughter Joy (1950) as Col. Fogarty
- Shadow of the Past (1950) as Solicitor
- Seven Days to Noon (1950) as The Prime Minister
- The Late Edwina Black (1951) as Head-Master
- The Adventurers (1951) as van Thaal Snr.
- Captain Horatio Hornblower R.N. (1951) as Adm. McCartney
- Hell Is Sold Out (1951) as Specialist
- Laughter in Paradise (1951) as Mr. Wagstaffe
- The Lavender Hill Mob (1951) as Turner
- The House in the Square (1951) as Ronson (uncredited)
- Mr. Denning Drives North (1951) as Coroner
- Angels One Five (1952) as Group Controller
- My Wife's Lodger (1952) as Doctor
- Circumstantial Evidence (1952) as Sir William Hanson QC
- Top Secret (1952) as Barworth Controller
- Hindle Wakes (1952) as Mr. Jeffcote
- Appointment in London (1953) as Instructor (uncredited)
- Martin Luther (1953)
- Malta Story (1953) as British Officer (uncredited)
- Flannelfoot (1953) as Insp. Duggan
- Escape by Night (1953) as Tallboy
- Stryker of the Yard (1953)
- The Million Pound Note (1954) as Samuel Clements (uncredited)
- Front Page Story (1954) as Editor
- Johnny on the Spot (1954) as Insp. Beveridge
- Forbidden Cargo (1954) as Mr. Bennett (uncredited)
- Seagulls Over Sorrento (1954) as Member of Admiralty Board (uncredited)
- The Beachcomber (1954) as Sir Henry Johnstone (uncredited)
- The Black Knight (1954) as The Abbot
- To Dorothy a Son (1954) as Parsons
- Tons of Trouble (1956) as Psychiatrist
- Private's Progress (1956) as Doctor at Medical
- The Man Who Never Was (1956) as Adams (uncredited)
- Bhowani Junction (1956) as General Ackerby (uncredited)
- Reach for the Sky (1956) as Air Vice-Marshal Leigh-Mallory
- Lust for Life (1956) as Commissioner De Smet
- Assignment Redhead (1956) as Dumetrius
- Around the World in 80 Days (1956) as Club Steward
- Sea Wife (1957) as Army Padre
- Kill Me Tomorrow (1957) as Mr. Brook
- Carry On Admiral (1957) as First Sea Lord
- The Surgeon's Knife (1957) as Maj. Tilling
- The Naked Truth (1957) as Chemist (uncredited)
- The Golden Disc (1958) as Mr. Dryden
- Carlton-Browne of the F.O. (1959) as Sir John Farthing
- The Man Who Could Cheat Death (1959) as Second Doctor (uncredited)
- Please Turn Over (1959) as Mr. Appleton
- And the Same to You (1960) as Trout
- Carry On Constable (1960) as Motorist (uncredited)
- Snowball (1960) as Mr. King
- Shoot to Kill (1960) as Wood
- Offbeat (1961) as J. B. Wykenham
- Three on a Spree (1961) as Judge
- Two Letter Alibi (1962) as Sir John Fawcett
- Satan Never Sleeps (1962) as Father Lemay (uncredited)
- Postman's Knock (1962) as Mr. Fordyce
- Heavens Above! (1963) as Cabinet Minister #1 (uncredited)
- The Haunting (1963) as Eldridge Harper
- Espionage (TV series) ('Do You Remember Leo Winters', episode) (1964) – Roger Upton
- The Tomb of Ligeia (1964) as Minister at Graveside
- Who Killed the Cat? (1966) as Gregory
- Song of Norway (1970) as Gade
- Zeppelin (1971) as Prime Minister
- The Ruling Class (1972) as Lord

== Personal life ==
He married firstly Tanzi Cutava Barozzi; the marriage was dissolved. His second wife was Allyne Dorothy Franks. He had two children, Jane and David. After the Second World War, Ronald Adam lived in Surbiton, Surrey, and died on 28 March 1979.

== Written works ==
Adam was part-adaptor of Professor Bernhardi and The Melody That Got Lost, among other works. He was the author of the plays An English Summer (1948), A Wind on the Heath (1949) and Marriage Settlement (1950), which he also produced.

He published a book on his theatrical memories:

- Ronald Adam (1938). Overture and Beginners. London: Victor Gollancz Ltd.

In the middle of the war he wrote two novels arising from his experiences in the RAF. Initially they were published using the pseudonym "Blake",

- Blake (1941). Readiness at Dawn. London: Victor Gollancz Ltd.
- Blake (1942). We Rendezvous at Ten. London: Victor Gollancz Ltd.

Both of these were later republished under his own name. He wrote again about his wartime experiences in:

- Blake (1948). To You the Torch. London: The Fortune Press.
