= The Twenty Questions Murder Mystery =

1950 mystery film by Paul L. Stein

The 20 Questions Murder Mystery
- Directed by: Paul L. Stein
- Screenplay by: Victor Katona; Patrick Kirwan
- Produced by: Victor Katona; Steven Pallos
- Starring: Robert Beatty; Rona Anderson; Clifford Evans
- Cinematography: Ted Lloyd; Ernest Palmer
- Edited by: Gerald Thomas
- Music by: Hans May
- Production companies: Pax Films; Pendennis Productions
- Distributed by: Grand National Pictures
- Release date: 23 January 1950
- Running time: 95 minutes
- Country: United Kingdom
- Language: English

The Twenty Questions Murder Mystery, also known as Murder on the Air, is a 1950 British second feature comedy crime film directed by Paul L. Stein and starring Robert Beatty, Rona Anderson, and Clifford Evans. The screenplay was by Victor Katona and Patrick Kirwan. The film is a hybrid: the Twenty Questions sections take place in a studio recording of the BBC radio programme with the regular panellists and presenter. This is threaded into the plot as the clues trigger a series of murders, each linked to the clue.

== Plot ==
A queue of people wait to enter the Paris cinema, a BBC studio used for radio recordings and broadcasts. Inside, the Twenty Questions panel show is being recorded in front of the audience, and broadcast live.

The first item to be guessed is "pig's ear" and this raises no issues. However, the second item to be guessed is "Rikitikitavi", the short story by Rudyard Kipling. The panel reach the correct answer on the final attempt.

Meanwhile, a wife finds her husband, Frederick Tavey, but known as Ricky Tavey, dead. He is found hanged and it is unclear if he has committed suicide.

Various press outlets pick up the odd coincidence. Rival reporters Bob and Mary try to unravel the mystery, while starting a romance.

Twenty Questions then tries to guess the Hanging Judge. This results in a judge being murdered. There appears to be a slight link between the murders, over and above the Twenty Questions issue. Both victims are linked to colonial India. The judge has an Indian manservant, Mohammed Ali, who becomes the prime suspect.

While Mary investigates the judge's home, a fire starts and she is locked in a room and almost killed. Potential evidence is destroyed in the fire.

Twenty Questions starts their final 60 second "quickie". The word is "charlatan" and is again correctly guessed. A note has been left with the panel which appears to be another warning. The panel concludes the clue links to "Rosemary is for Remembrance" (a line from Shakespeare's Hamlet), and from this they deduce it points to memory, and by sonance to Maurice Emery.

In Emery's house, Ali arrives at the French doors and Emery lets him in. They have a heated discussion in Hindustani. Later Emery is strangled thuggee style by someone.

The panellists next discuss a written clue in private: the two words seem to be "woodcock" and "gin". These seem to link to a general who has served in India and police are sent to protect him as he plays golf.

Meanwhile, BBC Commissionaire Tom Harmon goes to Mary and tells her the clue means her, not the general, linking to her surname: Game. She initially laughs. Bob tries to phone her but she is not allowed to answer. Harmon explains his links to India and his worship of Kali. He pulls out a rope to strangle her, just as Bob arrives. He jumps out of the window rather than be arrested.

In the Twenty Questions studio, Bob and Mary hold hands in the audience.

== Cast ==
A number of the cast play themselves as members of the Twenty Questions panel.

- Robert Beatty as Bob Beacham
- Rona Anderson as Mary Game
- Clifford Evans as Tom Harmon
- Edward Lexy as Det. Insp. Charlton
- Homi Bode as Mohammed Ali
- Olga Lindo as Olive Tavey
- Frederick Leister as Police Commissioner
- Harold Scott as Maurice Emery KC
- Wally Patch as Police Officer Tiny White
- Meadows White as Frederick Tavey
- Kynaston Reeves as Gen. Maitland
- Jeanne De Casalis as herself, Twenty Questions panelist
- Richard Dimbleby as himself, Twenty Questions panelist
- Norman Hackforth as himself, Twenty Questions mystery voice
- Stewart MacPherson as himself, Twenty Questions chairman
- Daphne Padel as herself, Twenty Questions panelist
- Jack Train as himself, Twenty Questions panelist
- Martin Boddey as 2nd plainclothes man
- Michael Dear as 1st newsboy
- Howard Douglas as Police Doctor
- Philip King as Ye Olde Cheshire Cheese waiter
- Gordon McLeod as Record News editor
- Sonya O'Shea as Stewart MacPherson's secretary
- Norman Pierce as Golf Club barman
- Liam Redmond as Echo News editor
- John Salew as John Grimshaw
- Merle Tottenham as Mrs Tavey's neighbour
- June Whitfield as lady talking in queue (uncredited)
- Arthur Young as doctor

== Critical response ==
The Monthly Film Bulletin wrote: "Interesting glimpses of the radio team and the inside of Broadcasting House."

Picturegoer wrote: "A bright and punchy little picture that most people will enjoy."

In British Sound Films: The Studio Years 1928–1959 David Quinlan rated the film as "average", writing: "Polished if easy-to-solve mystery with novel background."

In Halliwell's Film Guide, Leslie Halliwell said: "Somewhat heavy comedy mystery with interest arising from the broadcasting background."
