= Cloak Without Dagger =

1956 British film by Joseph Sterling

- British quad poster
- Directed by: Joseph Sterling
- Written by: A. R. Rawlinson
- Produced by: A. R. Rawlinson
- Starring: Philip Friend; Mary Mackenzie; Leslie Dwyer
- Cinematography: Gerald Gibbs
- Edited by: Carmen Beliaeff
- Music by: Wilfred Burns
- Production company: Balblair Productions
- Distributed by: Butcher's Film Service (UK)
- Release date: February 1956 (UK)
- Running time: 69 minutes
- Country: United Kingdom
- Language: English

Cloak Without Dagger (U.S title Operation Conspiracy) is a 1956 British second feature ('B') comedy thriller film directed by Joseph Sterling and starring Philip Friend, Mary Mackenzie and Leslie Dwyer. It was written and produced by A. R. Rawlinson.

== Plot ==
A fashion reporter is united with a former boyfriend, after a chance meeting, and helps him to track down an enemy spy.

== Cast ==
- Philip Friend as Major Felix Gratton
- Mary Mackenzie as Kyra Gabaine
- Leslie Dwyer as Fred Borcombe
- Allan Cuthbertson as Colonel Packham
- John G. Heller as Peppi Gilroudian dress designer
- Chin Yu as Yan Chu
- Bill Nagy as Mario Oromonda
- Patrick Jordan as Captain Willis
- Marianne Stone as Mrs. Markley
- Frank Thornton as Mr. Markley
- Gerrey Levey as night club entertainer
- Boris Ranevsky as Antoine
- María Mercedes as Spanish girl
- Larry Taylor as Sergeant Blake

== Critical reception ==
The Monthly Film Bulletin wrote: "Medium-paced British comedy thriller. Despite an obvious denouement and a somewhat disconcerting number of loose ends, the plot builds up a reasonable degree of suspense; and the leading players, notably John Heller as the professional spy, give confident performances."

The Radio Times described it as "an uncomfortable mix of romance and mystery".

Britmovie called it a "light-hearted spy story with a touch of romance."

In British Sound Films: The Studio Years 1928–1959 David Quinlan rated the film as "mediocre", writing: "Some thrills, some unintentional laughs."
