= The World Owes Me a Living =

- Jack Livesey, Judy Campbell & David Farrar
- Directed by: Vernon Sewell
- Written by: Vernon Sewell; Irwin Reiner
- Based on: novel by John Llewellyn Rhys
- Produced by: Louis H. Jackson
- Starring: David Farrar; Judy Campbell
- Cinematography: Geoffrey Faithfull; Gerald Gibbs
- Music by: Hans May
- Production company: British National Films
- Distributed by: Anglo-American Film Corporation
- Release date: January 1945
- Running time: 90 minutes
- Country: United Kingdom
- Language: English

The World Owes Me a Living is a 1945 British Second World War drama film directed by Vernon Sewell and starring David Farrar and Judy Campbell. It was written by Sewell and Irwin Reiner based on the novel of the same title by John Llewellyn Rhys, a young author who was killed in action in 1940 while serving in the Royal Air Force. Its credits acknowledge the assistance and co-operation of the Air Ministry and the de Havilland Aircraft Company.

== Plot ==
In June 1944, Air Commodore Paul Collyer crash lands his plane on return from a reconnaissance mission. He appears to be suffering from amnesia and is unable to pass on the vital information he learned from the mission. The surgeon diagnoses no actual injury to the brain, but states that the memory loss is most likely attributable to shock, and in such cases memory is most often recovered through some mental jolt from the past. Moira Barrett is summoned to his bedside; he seems to recognise her, and his mind starts to go into flashback mode.

Paul is seen as part of a flying circus display at which Moira is a spectator. A serious accident to one of the planes brings them together. That evening he meets old flame Eve Heatherley, who is now engaged Paul's friend Jack Graves. He runs into Moira again, and they talk of her passion for flying. The display accident causes the flying circus to fold and Paul is out of a job. He drifts from job to job for a time, before running into Chuck Rockley, a fellow performer in the old flying circus, who informs him that he and Jack are starting a new flying circus to be financed by Eve, now married to Jack. Paul accepts the offer to join them, and together they open the Pegasus Flying Field.

The venture is a success, but Eve soon loses interest and starts to take an interest in Jerry Frazer, a local ex-pilot. One afternoon an aircraft makes an emergency landing at Pegasus, and it turns out that the pilot is Moira, who is training for a record-breaking long-distance flight. She says she is looking for a co-pilot and asks Jack, who is talked out of it by Eve, and Paul, who refuses on the grounds of the plan being too risky. He does however agree to give Moira instruction in blind flying.

The Pegasus pilots are offered the opportunity to earn extra money by flying at night to give the local RAF station the opportunity to practise searchlight operations. Moira accompanies Paul on one flight, but the plane develops engine trouble and they have to land away from base. They check into a local hotel for the night and realise that they are in love. Meanwhile, Jerry, encouraged by Eve, is working on an idea he has for freight-carrying gliders. When Eve dies suddenly and unexpectedly, Jack steps in to help Jerry with his ideas. Initially there is little commercial interest in the glider idea, until finally an aviation company offers to build a prototype if Pegasus will agree to finance a transatlantic test flight. Moira agrees to front up the cash as long as she is allowed to join the flight.

The glider is built and preparations are finalised for its inaugural flight when an inspection by the Air Ministry calls a halt, as the prototype is too close in design to a craft secretly being worked on by their own designers. In recompense, the Air Ministry offers to buy out the Pegasus concern and provide the Pegasus men with RAF piloting jobs. Everyone is happy apart from Moira, who is bitterly disappointed about losing the chance of a transatlantic flight. Paul asks her to marry him.

The action returns to the present, where Paul's memory is obviously returning. He starts to question Moira but she tells him that he is over-tired and they will discuss things the following day. She leaves his bedside and goes into an ante-room, where she is met by two small children asking, "Can we see Daddy now?"

== Cast ==
- David Farrar as Paul Collyer
- Judy Campbell as Moira Barrett
- Sonia Dresdel as Eve Heatherley
- Jack Livesey as Jack Graves
- Eric Barker as Chuck Rockley
- John Laurie as Matthews
- Anthony Hawtrey as Jerry Frazer
- Wylie Watson as conductor
- Alan Keith as Manager Flying Circus
- Amy Veness as Mrs. Waterman
- Stewart Rome as Air Vice-Marshal

== Reception ==
The Monthly Film Bulletin wrote: "Basic faults of both script and direction here are that they try to crowd in far more incident and far more interplay of character and passion than either is capable of handling tidily. The result is that interest is dispersed and dissipated over a wandering dramatic movement which lacks both continuity and conviction. Unfortunately the players seem to have realised these shortcomings too, and been affected by them to such an extent that despite some valiant efforts – notably by Farrar, John Laurie and Judy Campbell – they never really overcome them."

Kine Weekly wrote: "Rambling romantic comedy melodrama .... It obviously sets out to do another First of the Few, but its initial development is much too much hampered by frivolous sex asides and tippling. The best thing about it is the promise shown by Judy Campbell. She has all the makings of a big screen star. ... The gist of the story is timidly revealed in the last reel, but the build-up, with its sketchy romantic interludes, many aimless flights and repeated pub-crawls, is neither good drama nor much of a compliment to the pioneers of British aviation. There is, of course, a possibility that its ragged, dishevelled continuity may be due to the fact that it mirrors the disordered mind and memory of the unconscious hero, but if so it is carrying subtlety a little too far."

In British Sound Films: The Studio Years 1928–1959 David Quinlan rated the film as "mediocre", writing: "Jerkily developed drama."

== Archive status ==
The British Film Institute did not hold original prints and negatives in the BFI National Archive as of 2010, and classified the film as "missing". The film was included on the BFI's "75 Most Wanted" list of missing British feature films, due mainly to contemporary re-evaluation by film historians of Sewell's output as a director. However, in 2014, the BFI reported that it is one of the titles which had surfaced. The Library of Congress holds "nitrate material" and it was hoped a copy could be acquired in the future. In 2020, the film was shown on Talking Pictures TV. As of 2023 the film remains unavailable on DVD.
