= Stafford Parker =

British artist, miner, and politician, active in Southern Africa in 1870s

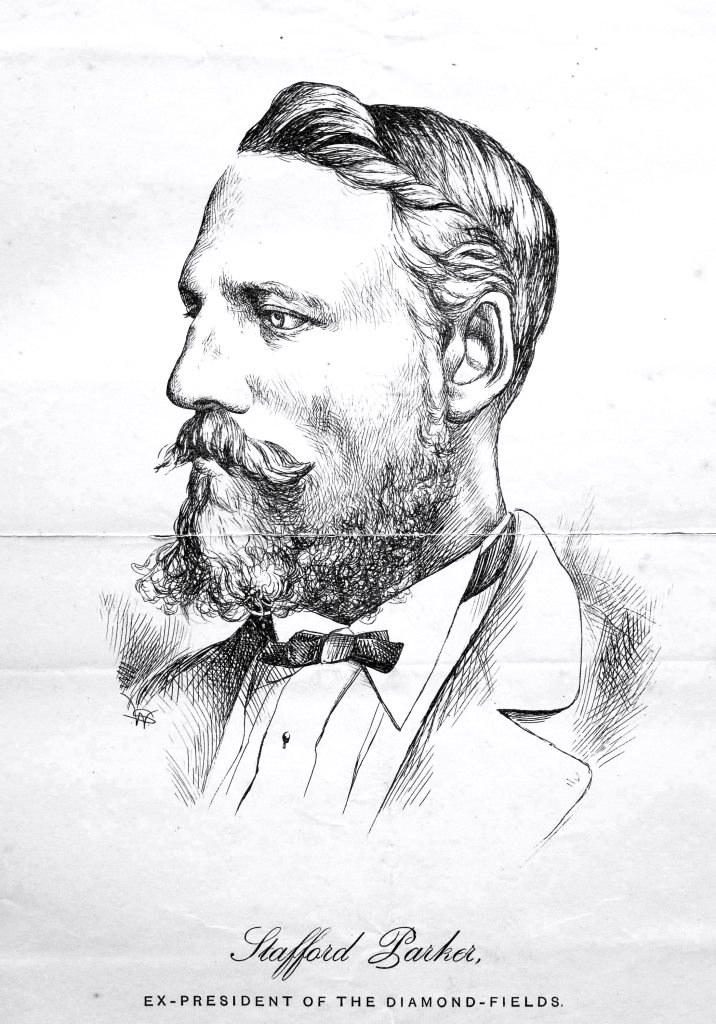
Stafford Parker - Ex President of the Diggers Republic of Klipdrift.

Diamond flag of the Diggers' Republic

Klipdrift flag of the Diggers' Republic

Stafford Parker was a British artist, miner and the only President of the small and short-lived "Diggers Republic" on the diamond fields of southern Africa.

== Griqualand West and President of the Diggers Republic ==
Originally an auctioneer and artist, Parker moved to mining in Griqualand West in southern Africa, where he rose to prominence as commandant of the miners' "Mutual Protection Association". The chaotic diamond fields were disputed among several political claimants, such as the local Griqua people, the Orange Free State and the Transvaal Republic. The white British miners ("diggers") rejected all of these claims and, following a series of disputes, a faction of the miners declared themselves independent until they could attain annexation to the British Empire.

=== Diggers' Republic ===
On 30 July 1870 at the settlement of Klipdrift, Parker became the first and only President of the short-lived self-declared "Diamond Diggers Republic" (also known as the "Klipdrift Republic"). His government renamed Klipdrift as "Parkerton" after its new president, and began to collect taxes (often at gunpoint). The size of mining plots was limited in a move towards economic egalitarianism; however non-white persons were prohibited from holding either land or mining licenses.

When the British authorities arrived and declared their authority over the area, Parker and his government resigned in February 1871.

== Later life ==
He then moved to Lydenburg in the Transvaal, where he opened the "Masonic Lodge" and was elected to the Volksraad (parliament) of the Transvaal Republic.

He was widely known for his distinctive and memorable appearance. He always dressed extremely elaborately in a presidential manner. His signature item of clothing was his large white top-hats, that he always wore and that made him immediately recognisable. The journalist R.W. Murray described him as a "swagger citizen", and a master story-teller.

He was portrayed by David Farrar in the film Diamond City (1949).
