= The Dark Tower (1943 film) =

1943 British film by John Harlow

- Directed by: John Harlow
- Written by: Reginald Purdell; Brock Williams
- Based on: The Dark Tower by George S. Kaufman; Alexander Woollcott
- Produced by: Max Milder
- Starring: Ben Lyon; Herbert Lom; Anne Crawford; David Farrar
- Cinematography: Otto Heller
- Edited by: Terence Fisher
- Music by: Jack Beaver
- Production company: Warner Brothers/First National
- Distributed by: Warner Brothers
- Release date: 18 October 1943
- Running time: 93 minutes
- Country: United Kingdom
- Language: English
- Budget: £63,390
- Box office: £62,900

The Dark Tower is a 1943 British thriller film directed by John Harlow and starring Ben Lyon, Anne Crawford, David Farrar and Herbert Lom. It was written by Reginald Purdell and Brock Williams based on the 1933 play of the same title by George S. Kaufman and Alexander Woollcott.

It was Herbert Lom's first major film role.

== Plot ==
Stephen Torg seeks work at a struggling travelling circus. While there, a lion escapes; Torg is able to control it with his skill at hypnotism. Phil Danton, the head of the circus, is so impressed, he hires the newcomer. Then someone comes up with an idea. Torg hypnotises Mary so that she can perform a dangerous aerial stunt without props. Her partner and boyfriend, Tom Danton is suspicious, but is overruled by the others.

With Torg's help, the circus becomes very successful, and Torg is able to force Phil into making him a partner. Meanwhile, Torg falls in love with Mary, though she makes it clear to him that her heart belongs to Tom. As time goes on, Torg begins to exert control over Mary. Before one performance, he tells her under hypnosis that she will be so tired that she will be unable to hold onto Tom during their trapeze act. As a result, Tom falls and is injured so badly, he has to stay in the hospital. The others suspect what is going on, but have no proof and are powerless to do anything.

When Tom recovers enough to return to the circus, he finds that Torg has Mary performing an even more dangerous stunt. While watching it, he unthinkingly cries out her name, breaking her trance and almost causing her fall from the high wire. While Torg is being lowered to the ground, Phil cuts the rope and Torg falls to his death. Phil admits his actions to his colleagues. It was the only way to free Mary. However, in a twist, the doctor reveals that Torg was shot in the head in mid-air, a feat that could only have been done by the circus's sharpshooter, Dora, who steps forward. The doctor goes to call the police and summons Tom to where Mary is waking up. They kiss.

Cut to the ringmaster announcing Danton's Empire Circus, and the credits roll over the performance.

== Cast ==
- Ben Lyon as Phil Danton
- Anne Crawford as Mary
- David Farrar as Tom Danton
- Herbert Lom as Stephen Torg
- Frederick Burtwell as 'Colonel' Willie Wainwright
- William Hartnell (credited as Bill Hartnell) as Jimmy Powers
- Josephine Wilson as Dora Shogun
- Elsie Wagstaff as Eve
- J.H. Roberts as Dr. Wilson
- Aubrey Mallalieu as Doctor

== Reception ==
The Monthly Film Bulletin wrote: "Herbert Lom as Torg is the only one of the cast who suggests that he is worthy of a better part in a film not quite so tawdry."

Kine Weekly wrote: "The plot is not particularly convincing, but an outstanding performance by Herbert Lom, who, incidentally, is not starred yet, walks away with the acting honours, helps considerably to make its Svengali-like characteristics intriguing. An authentic and glamorous sawdust ring atmosphere and a number of thrilling and neatly interpolated acts also lend a valuable touch of colour and excitement to the full-blooded and bizarre proceedings. Imaginative camera work does the rest. Very good popular and industrial booking."

Picture Show wrote: "Circus drama which is dominated by a powerful performance by Herbert Lom ...The story is not very original or convincing, but there are some good circus acts, and the settings are excellent"

Dennis Schwartz gave the film a B−, calling it “an entertaining crime drama… It concludes without an imaginative climax and at times the melodramatics seemed heavy-handed, but there are enough thrills and circus atmosphere to keep things always watchable.”
