= Frankly Howerd =

1959 British TV comedy series

- Genre: Comedy
- Written by: Phil Sharp; Reuben Ship; Frank Muir; Denis Norden
- Directed by: Harry Carlisle
- Starring: Frankie Howerd
- Country of origin: United Kingdom
- Original language: English
- No. of series: 1
- No. of episodes: 6

Production
- Producer: Harry Carlisle
- Running time: 30 minutes
- Production company: BBC

Original release
- Network: BBC One
- Release: 1 May – 5 June 1959

Frankly Howerd is a British comedy television series which aired on the BBC in six episodes between 1 May and 5 June 1959. It starred Frankie Howerd. It also featured Sidney Vivian and Helen Jessop. It was one of a number of series Howerd made for the BBC during the era. All episodes are now considered lost.

Other actors who appeared on the show included Sam Kydd, Totti Truman Taylor, Bruno Barnabe, Denys Graham, Bernard Hunter, Roger Avon and John Baker.

== Bibliography ==
- Anthony Slide. Some Joe You Don't Know: An American Biographical Guide to 100 British Television Personalities. Greenwood Publishing Group, 1996.
