= It's Hard to Be Good =

1948 English film by Jeffrey Dell

- Original British poster
- Directed by: Jeffrey Dell
- Written by: Jeffrey Dell
- Produced by: John W. Gossage
- Starring: Jimmy Hanley; Anne Crawford; Raymond Huntley
- Cinematography: Laurie Friedman
- Edited by: Helga Cranston
- Music by: Antony Hopkins
- Production company: Two Cities Films
- Distributed by: General Film Distributors (UK)
- Release dates: 10 November 1948 (London, England)
- Running time: 93 minutes
- Country: England
- Language: English

It's Hard to Be Good is a 1948 British comedy film directed and written by Jeffrey Dell and starring Jimmy Hanley, Anne Crawford and Raymond Huntley. It was shot at Denham Studios. The film's sets were designed by the art director Alex Vetchinsky. In the film, an ex-army officer finds his altruistic attempts to improve the world are unsuccessful.

== Plot ==
On leaving the army, officer and war hero Captain James Gladstone Wedge is full of idealism about bettering the world. He falls in love with Mary Leighton, who nursed him whilst he was recovering from his wartime injuries. He bungles a proposal to her at a railway station after being demobbed, but his good-nature had already convinced her that she should marry him.

Jimmy's attempts to promote goodwill and community spirit amongst his relatives and neighbours are always frustrated, due to their innate hostilities, which the latest collaborative war efforts did nothing to dispel. All his attempts at neighbourhood reconciliation having failed, and seeing that people have put their trust in the same status-quo of conflict after the war that existed before, Jimmy finally settles into a flat with Mary, and ends the film by loudly playing his trumpet in response to all the thoughtless noise around him, no longer caring what people might think.

== Cast ==
- Anne Crawford as Mary Leighton
- Jimmy Hanley as Captain James Gladstone Wedge VC
- Raymond Huntley as Williams
- Edward Rigby as Parkinson
- Elwyn Brook-Jones as Budibent
- Joyce Carey as Alice Beckett
- Geoffrey Keen as Sergeant Todd
- Lana Morris as Daphne
- David Horne as Edward Beckett
- Muriel Aked as Ellen Beckett
- Cyril Smith as Fred Hobson
- Leslie Weston as Buck
- Alison Leggatt as Mrs Buck
- Robert Adair as committee man
- Francis De Wolff as fighting neighbour
- Judith Furse as Sister Taylor
- Colin Gordon as neighbour with baby
- Joan Hickson as mending woman
- Sam Kydd as husband
- Leslie Perrins as Major Gordon
- Wensley Pithey as vicar
- Walter Rilla as Kamerovsky
- John Salew as committee man
- Marianne Stone as clerk in newspaper office
- Merle Tottenham as Mrs. Hobson
- Ian Wilson as fighting neighbour
- Joan Newell as woman shopper
- Amy Dalby as bargee's wife (uncredited)
- Gwen Williams as woman in town hall (uncredited)
- Dudley Williams as barman (uncredited)
- Guy Verney as lieutenant (uncredited)
- Isola Strong as girl in post office (uncredited)
- HG Stoker as elderly man (uncredited)
- George Spence as annoyed neighbour (uncredited)
- John Singer as cameraman (uncredited)
- Ian Selby as pedestrian outside Buckingham Palace (uncredited)

== Reception ==
The Monthly Film Bulletin wrote: "The film contains enough to amuse a fairly tolerant spectator, but the funniest situations must lose in effect if handled as clumsily as some are here, and when the characterisations for the most part are overdrawn. Jimmy Hanley, as Captain Wedge, copes manfully with more than a fair share of the general embarrassment."

The Daily Film Renter wrote: "Jimmy Hanley in the leading role as the impetuous, well-meaning Captain Wedge, is very good indeed, and his sturdy ingenuousness is given full play in this portrayal. Raymond Huntley as his boss, the scheming editor of a local paper, is good, too. Anne Crawford, the nurse who marries Wedge (despite his eccentricities), is cheery and whimsical. Wedge's relations ... are all handicapped by static, stagey direction, presumably a hangover from the director's playwright days."

In Forgotten British Film, Philip Gillett wrote: "The satirical It's Hard to be Good (1948) deserves rescuing from obscurity, with its decorated hero looking for a niche in an uncaring peacetime world."
