= Anthony Hawtrey =

British actor and theatre director (1909–1954)

Anthony John Hawtrey (22 January 1909 – 18 October 1954) was an English actor and theatre director. He began his acting career in 1930 and had begun directing by 1939. As director of the Embassy Theatre in London, several of his productions transferred to the West End. During his theatre career, Hawtrey also acted in television and on film. He was a member of the Terry family of actors.

== Life and career ==
Hawtrey was born in Claygate, Surrey, the illegitimate son of the actors Sir Charles Hawtrey and Olive Morris (daughter of Florence Terry), and was educated at Bradfield College prior to studying for the stage under Bertha Moore.

From 1930 Hawtrey worked as an actor in London, on tour in South Africa, and with the Liverpool Repertory Company. He appeared as the King of France in the Old Vic's production of King Lear in 1931, when his cousin John Gielgud played Lear. In 1939 he was director of productions at the Embassy Theatre in north London, subsequently becoming director at the Swindon Repertory Company. Hawtrey then became the second manager of the Dundee Repertory Theatre, succeeding Robert Thornley as Director of Productions in December 1940. He opened with a Christmas adaptation of The Scarlet Pimpernel, and from 1940 to 1942 he directed and acted in over 40 plays in Dundee.

=== Embassy Theatre ===
In January 1945 Hawtrey reopened the Embassy, which had been closed due to bomb damage, and under his directorship there followed a string of successful productions. From the first two years' output, 20 plays in all, he selected six for publication, in two volumes, under the title Embassy Successes, namely

- Worm's Eye View by R F Delderfield
- Father Malachy's Miracle adapted by Brian Doherty from the book by Bruce Marshall
- Zoo in Silesia by Richard Pollock
- National Velvet by Enid Bagnold
- Skipper Next to God by Jan de Hartog
- No Room at the Inn by Joan Temple.

Of these, Worm's Eye View and No Room at the Inn enjoyed successful transfers to the West End, at the Whitehall and Winter Garden Theatres respectively, and were made into films.

In 1948 a third volume of Embassy Successes comprised

- Peace Comes to Peckham by R F Delderfield
- Let My People Go! by Ian Hay
- Away from It All by Val Gielgud.

Further successes followed, among them the Sylvia Rayman play Women of Twilight, which proved a major hit for Hawtrey and the Embassy in 1951-52, transferring to both the Vaudeville Theatre and the Victoria Palace Theatre, and being made into a film.

Introducing the first two volumes of Embassy Successes, Hawtrey wrote: "Our policy is this. To present new plays dealing with today's world – in terms of entertainment. If these plays are written by new playwrights, so much the better. I am aware that the English theatre cannot properly thrive unless there is a constant supply of fresh dramatists. At the Embassy, we shall always do everything in our power to foster this supply." Val Gielgud, in the third Embassy Successes book, praised Hawtrey's "persistent refusal to be deterred from experiment by difficulties of staging which too frequently have proved fatal to the chances of a play's production in the West End." According to the actor Leslie Phillips, Hawtrey "was a charming, easy-going man with a great sense of humour and a natural instinct for popular theatre."

=== Screen work ===
In parallel with his work in theatre, Hawtrey also acted in television productions and several films, a few of which were

- Inquest (1939) (TV)
- Warn That Man (1943)
- Headline (1944)
- The Hundred Pound Window (1944)
- The World Owes Me a Living (1945)
- Latin Quarter (1945)
- The First Gentleman (1948)
- Julius Caesar (1951) (TV; as Mark Antony)

== Personal life ==
He was married to the actress Marjorie Clark, with whom he had two sons, Charles and the actor Nicholas (1932–2018). He died in London of a heart attack in 1954, at the age of 45.
