= Clifford Evans (actor) =

Welsh actor (1912–1985)

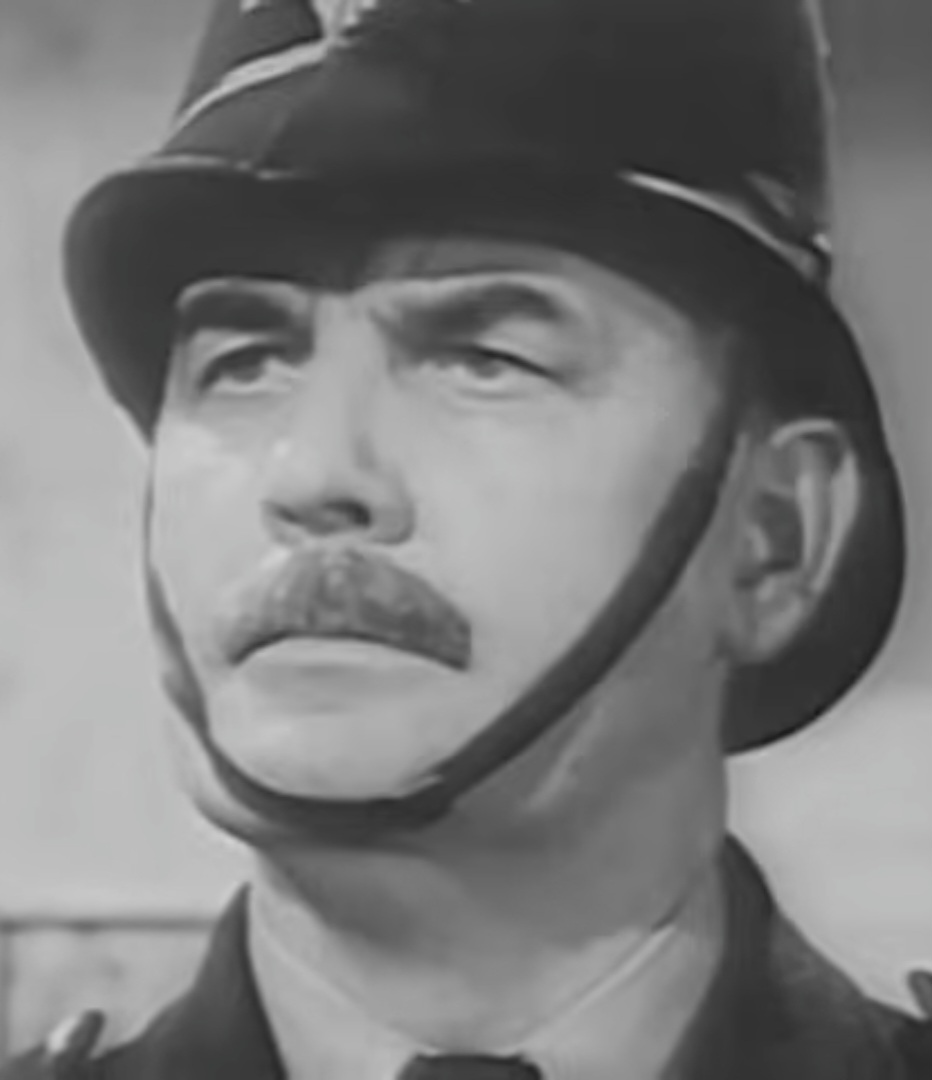
- Evans in an episode of One Step Beyond (1960)
- Born: Clifford George Evans; 17 February 1912; Senghenydd, Glamorgan, Wales
- Died: 9 June 1985 (aged 73); Aberaeron, Dyfed, Wales
- Occupation: Actor
- Years active: 1935–1978
- Spouse: Hermione Hannen (m. 1943; died 1983)

Clifford George Evans (17 February 1912 – 9 June 1985) was a Welsh actor.

During the summer of 1934 Evans appeared in A Midsummer Night's Dream at the Open Air Theatre in London. He played many parts in British films of the 1930s, then during the Second World War was a conscientious objector, serving in the Non-Combatant Corps. He continued to act during the war and starred in the films The Foreman Went to France (1942) and The Flemish Farm (1943).

After the war, Evans's best known film roles were for Hammer Studios: he played Don Alfredo Carledo in The Curse of the Werewolf (1961) and Professor Zimmer, an often inebriated vampire-hunter, in Kiss of the Vampire (1963). His last screen role was in Granada TV's A Land of Ice Cream in 1985.

On television, Evans appeared with George Woodbridge and Tim Turner in the 15-episode series Stryker of the Yard (1957). Between 1965 and 1969, he played a major role in the TV boardroom drama The Power Game, playing building tycoon Caswell Bligh. He is also among several British actors to play the character of Number Two in The Prisoner ("Do Not Forsake Me Oh My Darling", 1967). He also appeared in three episodes of The Avengers, in The Champions, The Saint, and Randall and Hopkirk (Deceased) ("When did You Start to Stop Seeing Things?", 1969). The following year, he played Sir Iain Dalzell, a leading character in the BBC TV series Codename (1970).

In 1943 he married Hermione Hannen, an actress and wartime radio announcer, who predeceased him in 1983.

== Partial filmography ==
- The River House Mystery (1935) – Ivan
- Ourselves Alone (1936) – Commandant Connolly
- Calling the Tune (1936) – Peter Mallory
- The Tenth Man (1936) – Ford
- The Mutiny of the Elsinore (1937) – Bert Rhyne
- Under Secret Orders (1937) – Rene Condoyan
- 13 Men and a Gun (1938) – Jorg
- Luck of the Navy (1938) – Lieut. Peel
- His Brother's Keeper (1940) – Jack Cornell
- At the Villa Rose (1940) – Tace
- The Proud Valley (1940) – Seth Jones
- The House of the Arrow (1940) – Maurice Thevenet
- Freedom Radio (1941) – Dressler
- Fingers (1941) – Fingers
- Love on the Dole (1941) – Larry Meath
- Penn of Pennsylvania (1942) – William Penn
- The Foreman Went to France (1942) – Fred Carrick, the foreman
- Suspected Person (1942) – Jim Raynor
- The Saint Meets the Tiger (1943) – Tidemarsh / The Tiger
- The Flemish Farm (1943) – Jean Duclos
- The Silver Darlings (1947) – Roddie
- While I Live (1947) – Peter
- The Twenty Questions Murder Mystery (1950) – Tom Harmon
- Escape Route (1952) – Michael Grand
- The Accused (1953) – Dan Anderson
- Valley of Song (1953) – Geraint Llewellyn
- The Straw Man (1953) – Jeff Howard
- Stryker of the Yard (1953) – Inspector Stryker
- Solution by Phone (1954) – Richard Hanborough
- The Red Dress (1954) – Sam Pugh (segment "Red Dress' story)
- Companions in Crime (1954) – Inspector Stryker
- The Gilded Cage (1955) – Ken Aimes
- Passport to Treason (1956) – Orlando Syms
- Face in the Night (1957) – Inspector Ford
- At the Stroke of Nine (1957) – Inspector Hudgell
- The Heart Within (1957) – Matthew Johnson
- Violent Playground (1958) – Heaven
- SOS Pacific (1959) – Petersen
- The Curse of the Werewolf (1961) – Alfredo
- Kiss of the Vampire (1963) – Professor Zimmer
- The Long Ships (1964) – King Harald
- A Twist of Sand (1968) – Admiral Tringham
- One Brief Summer (1971) – Mark Stevens
