= Petra Davies =

British actress (1930–2016)

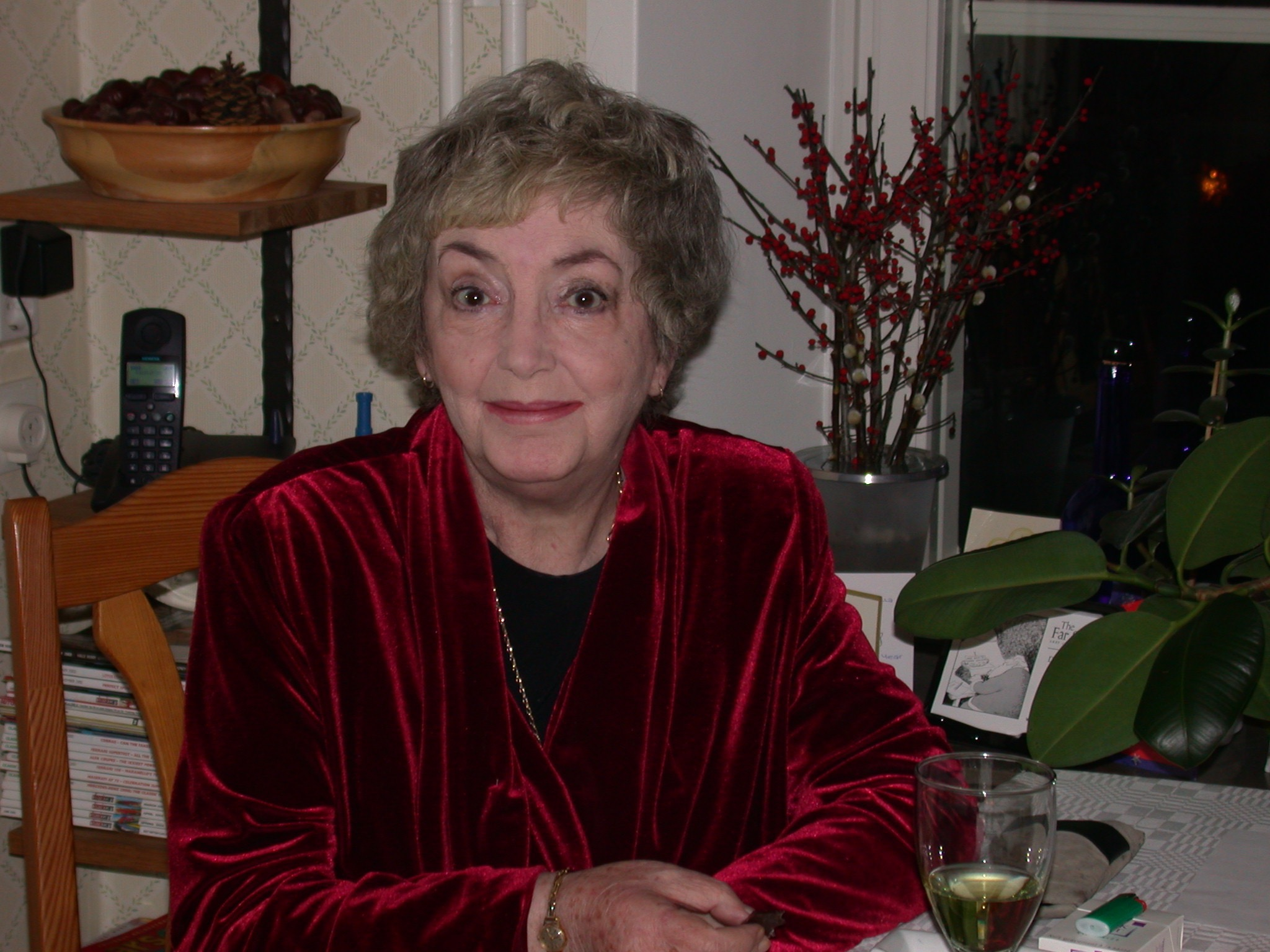
- Davies in 2000
- Born: 24 July 1930; Eltham, London, England
- Died: 22 March 2016 (aged 85); Abbey Wood, London, England
- Occupation: Actress
- Years active: 1950–1994
- Spouse: Jack May (m. 1957; died 1997)
- Children: 2

Petra Davies (24 July 1930 – 22 March 2016) was a British actress.

== Early years ==
Davies was born in Eltham, London, England on 24 July 1930 and grew up in Newport, Wales. Her parents were Welsh. She trained at the Royal Academy of Dramatic Art 1947 – 1949.

== Career ==
Davies had many television appearances and had worked in films and theatre. Her TV roles included appearances in Vanity Fair, Precious Bane, Destination Downing Street, Emma, Melissa, ITV Play of the Week, Dolly, The Saint, Z-Cars, Crown Court and General Hospital. Her films included Four Days (1951), Operation Amsterdam (1959), The Silent Invasion (1962) and Two Letter Alibi (1962).

Davies' last appearance was in an episode of The Ruth Rendell Mysteries.

== Personal life ==
Davies was married to the actor Jack May from 1957 until his death in 1997.

== Death ==
Davies died on 22 March 2016 in Abbey Wood, London, England. She was survived by her two children.
