= George Provis =

British art director (1901–1989)

- Born: 1901; Devizes, Wiltshire, England; United Kingdom
- Died: 1989 (aged 87–88); United States
- Occupation: Art director
- Years active: 1936–1977 (film)

George Provis (1901–1989) was a British art director who worked on over a hundred films during a lengthy career. He began his career working on quota quickies during the 1930s. After the Second World War, Provis was appointed by Sydney Box to head the art department at Gainsborough Pictures.

== Selected filmography ==
- The Man Behind the Mask (1936)
- One Good Turn (1936)
- Everything Is Rhythm (1936)
- Cotton Queen (1937)
- Sing as You Swing (1937)
- Rhythm Racketeer (1937)
- Boys Will Be Girls (1938)
- Stardust (1938)
- Much Too Shy (1942)
- Rhythm Serenade (1943)
- Get Cracking (1943)
- Bell-Bottom George (1944)
- He Snoops to Conquer (1944)
- I Didn't Do It (1945)
- George in Civvy Street (1946)
- This Man Is Mine (1946)
- Dear Murderer (1947)
- The Brothers (1947)
- Holiday Camp (1947)
- When the Bough Breaks (1947)
- The Calendar (1948)
- Daybreak (1948)
- Good-Time Girl (1948)
- A Boy, a Girl and a Bike (1949)
- The Lost People (1949)
- Don't Ever Leave Me (1949)
- The Bad Lord Byron (1949)
- Diamond City (1949)
- So Long at the Fair (1950)
- Traveller's Joy (1950)
- Appointment with Venus (1951)
- Madame Louise (1951)
- There Is Another Sun (1951)
- The Late Edwina Black (1951)
- Venetian Bird (1952)
- You Know What Sailors Are (1954)
- The Beachcomber (1954)
- To Dorothy, a Son (1954)
- Mad About Men (1954)
- Above Us the Waves (1955)
- Eyewitness (1956)
- The Black Tent (1956)
- The Passionate Stranger (1957)
- The Story of Esther Costello (1957)
- Further Up the Creek (1958)
- Subway in the Sky (1959)
- Web of Suspicion (1959)
- The Treasure of San Teresa (1959)
- SOS Pacific (1959)
- Never Let Go (1960)
- Two Letter Alibi (1962)
- Night of the Prowler (1962)
- Tarzan Goes to India (1962)
- Hide and Seek (1964)
- Do You Know This Voice? (1964)
- The Eyes of Annie Jones (1964)
- A Jolly Bad Fellow (1964)
- Catacombs (1965)
- Joey Boy (1965)
- Sands of the Kalahari (1965)
- The Idol (1966)
- Mrs. Brown, You've Got a Lovely Daughter (1968)
- Hostile Witness (1968)
- The Oblong Box (1969)
- The File of the Golden Goose (1969)
- Cry of the Banshee (1970)
- Whoever Slew Auntie Roo? (1972)
- The Fiend (1972)
- The Creeping Flesh (1973)
- Craze (1974)

== Bibliography ==
- Spicer, Andrew. Sydney Box. Manchester University Press, 2006.
