= The Silent Invasion =

1962 British film by Max Varnel

- Belgian poster
- Directed by: Max Varnel
- Written by: Brian Clemens
- Produced by: Edward J. Danziger; Harry Lee Danziger
- Starring: Eric Flynn; Petra Davies; Francis de Wolff; Martin Benson
- Cinematography: James Wilson (as Jimmy Wilson)
- Edited by: Derek Parsons
- Music by: Bill LeSage
- Production company: Danziger Productions
- Distributed by: Planet Film Distributors (UK)
- Release date: 31 January 1962 (UK)
- Running time: 70 minutes
- Country: United Kingdom
- Language: English

The Silent Invasion is a 1962 British second feature ('B') film directed by Max Varnel and starring Eric Flynn and Petra Davies. It was written by Brian Clemens and produced by The Danzigers.

== Plot ==
During WW II, a German garrison is stationed in the small French town of Mereux. Two locals are captured during an attempted act of sabotage, and executed. French local Maria, who is the sister of the younger of the two men executed, is persuaded by the Resistance to form a relationship with German captain Erik Von Strafen, in order to obtain information. As time passes, however, she develops feelings for the Captain.

== Cast ==
- Eric Flynn as Erik von Strafen
- Petra Davies as Maria
- Francis de Wolff as Emile
- Martin Benson as S.S. Borge
- Melvyn Hayes as Jean
- Warren Mitchell as Robert
- Guy Deghy as Pierre
- Noel Dyson as Mme. Veroux
- André Maranne as Argen
- Jan Conrad as Sgt. Major
- John Serret as Jacques
- C. Denier Warren as Gillie
- Max Faulkner as Curt
- André Muller as Wilhelm

== Critical reception ==
The Monthly Film Bulletin wrote: "Glumly unconvincing wartime melodrama, resurrected for no evident reason after six years on the shelf."

TV Guide thought the film "overwrought and too unrealistic to be taken seriously."
