= Duel in the Jungle =

1954 film

- 1954 US film poster
- Directed by: George Marshall
- Written by: Sam Marx; T.J. Morrison
- Produced by: Marcel Hellman; Tony Owen
- Starring: Dana Andrews; Jeanne Crain; David Farrar
- Cinematography: Erwin Hillier
- Edited by: Edward B. Jarvis
- Music by: Mischa Spoliansky
- Production companies: Associated British Picture Corporation; Marcel Hellman Productions
- Distributed by: Associated British-Pathé; Warner Bros. Pictures (US)
- Release date: 21 August 1954
- Running time: 98 minutes
- Country: United Kingdom
- Language: English
- Box office: £205,010 (UK) $1.1 million (US/Canada)

Duel in the Jungle is a 1954 British adventure film combining the detective film with the jungle adventure genres directed by George Marshall and starring Dana Andrews, Jeanne Crain and David Farrar. It was shot at the Elstree Studios near London and on location in Southern Africa. The film's sets were designed by the art director Terence Verity. It was produced by Associated British in conjunction with Marcel Hellman. It was released in the United States by Warner Bros. Pictures.

== Plot ==
American insurance investigator Scott Walters is sent to London to interview businessman Perry Henderson about his US$2 million insurance policy leaving his elderly mother as sole beneficiary. Walters meets and is taken with Perry's personal secretary Marian Taylor but wishes to speak to Perry. His cousin Arthur Henderson explains that Perry is deep sea diving off the coast of Portuguese East Africa but doesn't tell Walters he is after deposits of diamonds on the sea bed. Alarmed by the danger, Walters tells Arthur to make Perry stop all dangerous activities or he will forfeit his policy.

Walters attempts to romance Marian, but she tells him she is engaged to Perry. He decides to return to America but boarding the plane, he sees a newspaper headline that Perry was swept overboard off the SS Nigeria during a storm when the ship was off Lourenço Marques. Walters leaves the plane and later goes to inform Marian but her landlady is cleaning her recently vacated flat saying that Marian flew off somewhere. He thinks she has gone to South Africa, so Walters flies to South Africa where he attempts to book passage on the SS Nigeria, a coastal tramp steamer. Walters finds the ship has departed, but he flies to Beira to board her there where he books accommodation sharing a compartment with Pitt, an English salesman.

During a storm Pitt and Walters are the only passengers well enough to leave their cabin to dine with the ship's captain. Keeping his occupation a secret, Walters infuriates the captain by attempting to question him about Perry's death. Walters's suspicions are further aroused when he discovers that the only witnesses to Perry's death were employees of his firm, which also owned the SS Nigeria. The next day Walters finds a secret compartment on the ship and finds a cigarette butt on the compartment's floor bearing the markings of Perry's bespoke cigarettes. Walters also discovers Marian is a passenger aboard. Marian informs the captain that she does not want Walters to bother her.

During a storm the next night, Pitt borrows Walters's trench coat to go outside. One of the crew coshes Pitt and attempts to throw him overboard but his efforts are stopped when Marian screams. Walters deduces the crewman mistook Pitt for himself and wanted him dead. When Marian goes ashore the crew attempt to keep Walters on board but he literally jumps ship and tracks Marian to Northern Rhodesia. A safari is taking her into the jungle where she supposedly is going to meet Perry's mother. With the help of a police superintendent, Walters tracks down Perry's mother.

Walters pursues Marian to discover the truth about Perry's whereabouts, with Marian being increasingly attracted to him. Walters and Marian find Perry and discover he has faked his death to get the insurance money. Perry tries to kill Walters by giving him a rifle with the firing pin removed so that a lion will kill him. Vincent, Perry's native right-hand man kills the lion further inflaming the situation. They have to flee, taking Vincent with them. They are pursue by Perry and his African helpers. The fugitives are in danger of death by water, gunshot and wild beasts (the cliche of snakes, lions and leopards) but are rescued in the nick of time by the police superintendent. Perry fights with Walters and then flees in a boat down the rapids. He capsizes and Walters saves him. Perry is arrested. The film ends with Walters and Marian embracing.

== Cast ==
- Dana Andrews as Scott Walters
- Jeanne Crain as Marian Taylor
- David Farrar as Perry Henderson / Arthur Henderson
- Patrick Barr as Superintendent Roberts
- George Coulouris as Captain Malburn
- Charles Goldner as Martell
- Wilfrid Hyde-White as Pitt
- Mary Merrall as Mrs Henderson
- Heather Thatcher as Lady on the Niagara
- Michael Mataka as Vincent
- Paul Carpenter as Clerk
- Irene Handl as Mary Taylor
- Delphi Lawrence as Pan American Girl
- Mary Mackenzie as Junior Secretary
- Bee Duffell as Irish Landlady
- Alec Finter as Waiter
- Patrick Parnell as Wireless Operator
- John Salew as Clerk - Henderson's Office
- Walter Gotell as Jim
- Bill Fraser as Smith - Hotel Clerk
- Lionel Ngakane as Servant
- Robert Sansom as Steward
- Larry Taylor as Seaman
- Simone Silva as Redhead

== Production notes ==
In September 1952, the film was going to be made with Yvonne De Carlo and Joseph Cotten. In April 1953, Sam Marx was trying to set it up in London with Cotten and Gene Tierney. In May, Kurt and Marcel Hellman, producers, were discussing shooting footage of the film in South Africa later that year.

By June, the leads were confirmed as Dana Andrewas and Jeanne Crain. It was the first production from Todon, a company of Tony Owen and his wife Donna Reed. There would be five weeks filming in South Africa with the rest in London. The bulk of finance came from Moulin, a British company headed by Harold Mirisch. Associated British distributed. David Farrar signed to play the second male lead.

Although the copyright states that the screenplay was based on an original story by S. K. Kennedy, a July 1953 Variety article reports that screenwriters Samuel Marx and Tommy Morrison used a German novel originally published in 1942 as its source.

=== Shooting ===
Principal photography occurred between 24 August and early December 1953. Portions of the film were shot in South Africa at Port Elizabeth and Johannesburg, in Bechuanaland (now Botswana), and at Victoria Falls (on the Zambia/Zimbabwe border). An October 1953 Daily Variety news item stated that scenes were shot at Kruger National Park.

On 25 September 1953, British assistant director Anthony Kelly, aged 32, died when he was thrown from his overturned canoe into a whirlpool on the Zambesi River; they were near Livingstone, Zambia, towards Palm Island. He was in a boat with two hunters and an African guide. The other three got to safety but not Kelly.

The Hollywood Reporter stated that after audiences at a 29 July 1954 Los Angeles preview jeered at the film's ending, Warner Bros. re-edited the final scenes. The Variety review lists the running time of the British release as 105 minutes; reviews of the American version list the running time as 98 minutes.

Michael Mataka who sings the song "The Night Belongs to Me" became the first person of African descent to become commissioner of the Zambian Police.

== Reception ==
According to Owen, the film made $3 million. It launched Todon on a series of films set in Africa with two American leads.

In 1954, it was expected the film would earn $2 million in the US, returning $1.2 million to Britain. According to Kinematograph Weekly the film was a "money maker" at the British box office in 1954.

== Soundtrack ==
The Night Belongs To Me
Music by Mischa Spoliansky
Lyrics by Norman Newell
Sung by Michael Mataka
