= Rogue's Yarn =

1957 British film by Vernon Sewell

- Directed by: Vernon Sewell
- Written by: Vernon Sewell; Ernle Bradford
- Produced by: George Maynard
- Starring: Nicole Maurey; Derek Bond; Elwyn Brook-Jones
- Cinematography: Hal Morey
- Edited by: Peter Rolfe Johnson
- Music by: Robert Sharples
- Production company: Cresswell Productions
- Distributed by: Eros Films
- Release date: August 1957
- Running time: 80 minutes
- Country: United Kingdom
- Language: English

Rogue's Yarn is a 1957 British second feature crime drama film directed by Vernon Sewell and starring Nicole Maurey, Derek Bond and Elwyn Brook-Jones. It was written by Sewell and Ernle Bradford, and distributed by the independent Eros Films.

== Synopsis ==
John Marsden is conducting an affair with Frenchwoman Michele Cartier, but their hopes that his wealthy invalid wife will soon die are thwarted by her recovery. Pressured by his lover, Marsden begins planning a perfect crime to murder his wife at the family home while he is supposed to be sailing on his yacht between Newhaven and Le Havre in Normandy. However, his hopes of getting clean away from the crime are threatened by the persistent investigations of Detective Inspector Walker.

== Cast ==
- Nicole Maurey as Michele Cartier
- Derek Bond as John Marsden
- Elwyn Brook-Jones as Inspector Walker
- Hugh Latimer as Sergeant Adams
- John Serret as Inspector Lafarge
- John Salew as Sam Youles
- Nigel Fitzgerald as commissioner
- Joan Carol as nurse
- Madoline Thomas as cook
- Agatha Carroll as Hester Marsden
- Barbara Christie as maid
- Hugh Morton as doctor
- Colin Tapley as police inspector
- Sidney Vivian as corner shop proprietor
- André Maranne as French fisherman

== Production ==
The film was shot at Brighton Studios. The sets were designed by art director Bernard Sarron.

== Reception ==
The Monthly Film Bulletin wrote: "A routine detective story of the "how-he-did-it" school, fairly interesting in plot but sometimes over-calculated in presentation. The two principals are dull, but John Serret is entertaining as a French police official, while Elwyn Brook-Jones avoids the hackneyed in his characterisation of a Scotland Yard man – though his disrespect for superior authorities seems somehow unlikely."

Picture Show wrote: "Derek Bond, as the murderer, Nicole Maurey, as his French girl-friend, and Elwyn Brook-Jones, as the detective, give good performances in this interesting and holding tale."

In British Sound Films: The Studio Years 1928–1959 David Quinlan rated the film as "average", writing: "Intriguing will-they-get-him yarn with some offbeat characterization in supporting roles."
