= The Late Edwina Black =

1951 British film by Maurice Elvey

- U.S. poster
- Directed by: Maurice Elvey
- Written by: David Evans; Charles Frank; William Dinner (play); William Morum (play)
- Produced by: Ernest Gartside
- Starring: David Farrar; Geraldine Fitzgerald; Roland Culver
- Cinematography: Stephen Dade
- Edited by: Douglas Myers
- Music by: Allan Gray
- Production company: Romulus Films
- Distributed by: British Lion Films
- Release date: March 1951
- Running time: 78 minutes
- Country: United Kingdom
- Language: English
- Box office: £81,703 (UK)

The Late Edwina Black (U.S. title: Obsessed) is a 1951 British crime film, directed by Maurice Elvey and starring David Farrar, Geraldine Fitzgerald and Roland Culver. It was written by David Evans and Charles Frank adapted from the 1949 stage play by William Dinner and William Morum.

The film is a melodramatic murder mystery set in the Victorian era.

== Plot ==
The domineering Edwina Black has just died, and the general feeling appears to be of relief. The local community whispers that her death is a blessing for all concerned, particularly her henpecked widower Gregory and downtrodden personal companion Elizabeth. Unknown to anybody, Gregory and Elizabeth have been lovers for some time, and matters take a serious turn when the local doctor, feeling uneasy about Edwina's sudden and unexpected death, orders a post-mortem. It reveals that Edwina's body is full of arsenic.

Inspector Martin has been instructed to get to the bottom of the case and his suspicions naturally fall on Gregory and Elizabeth, who have motive and opportunity. In the absence of proof, he sets out to trap them, hoping that they will inadvertently implicate themselves. A guidebook to Italy is found in Elizabeth's possession. How does she explain that? A complicating factor arises when it is discovered that the housekeeper Ellen has been keeping secrets of her own, and also had good reason for wishing Edwina ill.

Martin proceeds to drop seemingly innocuous but loaded observations into the ears of the three suspects, hoping to provoke doubts and foster mutual suspicion. This works so well that they are soon apparently falling over themselves to incriminate each other. Martin has to try to untangle the stories to come up with a coherent picture of what actually happened, all the while being aware that he is perhaps being misdirected. And over all this is the feeling that the dead Edwina is still controlling Gregory and Elizabeth's relationship.

== Cast ==
- David Farrar as Gregory Black
- Geraldine Fitzgerald as Elizabeth Graham
- Roland Culver as Inspector Martin
- Jean Cadell as Ellen
- Mary Merrall as Lady Southdale
- Harcourt Williams as Dr. Septimus Prendergast
- Ronald Adam as headmaster
- Charles Heslop as vicar
- Sydney Moncton as Horace

== Production ==
The film was made at Isleworth Studios, with sets were designed by the art director George Provis and costumes by Elizabeth Haffenden. Finance came from Romulus Films.

== Critical reception ==
The Monthly Film Bulletin wrote: "Based on the stage success about the mysterious death of a village schoolteacher's dominating wife, The Late Edwina Black is an adequate Victorian thriller of the Gaslight type. ... An unpretentious thriller which succeeds in being thrilling."

The New York Times called it "the most stifling and farfetched bore to snake across the Atlantic so far this year."

The Radio Times called it a "feeble Victorian whodunnit".

Noirish wrote, "for much of the time this is all very well handled, and sometimes with some subtlety."

It was one of 15 films selected by Steve Chibnall and Brian McFarlane in The British "B" Film, their survey of British B films, as among the most meritorious of the B films made in Britain between World War II and 1970. They noted that it "was not especially well received at the time, but has worn better than many that were". They praised the four central performers, Farrar, Cadell, Culver and Fitzgerald: "few character actresses can do mean-faced malevolence better than Jean Cadell"; and "the beautiful and underused Geraldine Fitzgerald is particularly fine".
