= The Golden Horde (film) =

1951 film by George Sherman

- Directed by: George Sherman
- Written by: George Drayson Adams (writer); Harold Lamb (story)
- Produced by: Robert Arthur and Howard Christie
- Starring: Ann Blyth; David Farrar; Richard Egan
- Cinematography: Russell Metty
- Edited by: Frank Gross
- Music by: Hans J. Salter
- Production company: Universal International Pictures
- Distributed by: Universal International Pictures
- Release date: October 1951
- Running time: 77 minutes
- Country: United States
- Language: English
- Box office: $1.5 million (US rentals)

The Golden Horde is a 1951 American historical adventure film directed by George Sherman and starring Ann Blyth, David Farrar, with George Macready, Richard Egan and Peggie Castle. Many of the exterior scenes were shot at Death Valley National Park in California. Filmed in Technicolor, it is one of a series of Universal Pictures color films in exotic settings released in the same time period.

== Plot ==
In 1220, Sir Guy of Devon and a small band of English crusaders arrive at Samarkand in Central Asia. The city and its ruling princess Shalimar are threatened by Genghis Khan and his hordes. Despite the mutual attraction between Shalimar and Sir Guy, their differing methods threaten any hope of victory over Genghis Khan.

== Cast ==
- Ann Blyth as Princess Shalimar
- David Farrar as Sir Guy of Devon
- George Macready as Raven the Shaman
- Richard Egan as Gill
- Peggie Castle as Lailee
- Henry Brandon as Juchi, son of Genghis Khan
- Howard Petrie as Tuglik
- Marvin Miller as Genghis Khan
- Donald Randolph as Torga
- Poodles Hanneford as Friar John

== Reception ==
In a contemporary review, critic Philip K. Scheuer of the Los Angeles Times wrote: "Arrows fly, swords flash and even broadaxes descend periodically, providing all present—including the spectator—with workouts of a sort. For anyone out of his teens, however, placing any real credibility in these bizarre goings-on is likely to require more exertion than it's worth."

== See also ==
- Golden Horde
- List of historical drama films of Asia

== Bibliography ==
- Kevin J. Harty. The Reel Middle Ages: American, Western and Eastern European, Middle Eastern and Asian Films About Medieval Europe. McFarland, 1999.
