= The Harassed Hero =

1954 film directed by Maurice Elvey

- Guy Middleton and Joan Winmill Brown
- Directed by: Maurice Elvey
- Written by: Brock Williams
- Based on: The Harassed Hero by Ernest Dudley
- Produced by: Clive Nicholas
- Starring: Guy Middleton; Joan Winmill Brown; Elwyn Brook-Jones
- Cinematography: Hone Glendinning
- Edited by: Anne Barker
- Music by: Frank Chacksfield
- Production company: Corsair Pictures
- Distributed by: Associated British-Pathé
- Release date: 26 July 1954
- Running time: 61 minutes
- Country: United Kingdom
- Language: English

The Harassed Hero is a 1954 British second feature ('B') comedy film directed by Maurice Elvey and starring Guy Middleton, Joan Winmill Brown and Elwyn Brook-Jones. It was based on the 1954 novel of the same title by Ernest Dudley.

== Plot ==
Wealthy hypochondriac (acute apprehension complex) bachelor Murray Selwyn has been ordered by his doctors to avoid stress, but finds himself face to face with a gang of counterfeiters. Murray has unwittingly come into possession of the printing plates the gang is after. His stress levels escalate further when Murray's nurse is kidnapped by the gang.

== Cast ==
- Guy Middleton as Murray Selwyn
- Joan Winmill Brown as Nurse Brooks
- Elwyn Brook-Jones as Logan
- Mary Mackenzie as Estelle Logan
- Harold Goodwin as Twigg
- Joss Ambler as Dr. Grice
- Clive Morton as Detective Inspector Archer
- Hugh Moxey as Detective Sergeant Willis
- Stafford Byrne
- Gabrielle Brune
- Gaylord Cavallaro as Logan's henchman Ken
- Simone Lovell
- Alfred Maron as Logan's henchman Pearce

== Production ==
The film was shot at Walton Studios and on location in London. The film's sets were designed by the art director John Stoll.

== Critical reception ==
The Monthly Film Bulletin wrote: "This film provides a comic hero, comic servant, comic crook, comic detective, comic doctor – everything, in fact, except authentic comic invention."

Kine Weekly wrote: "Te picture punctuates farce with fights and chases, but never takes itself too seriously. Neither does it run to seed. Guy Middleton contributes a polished performance, as the dithery Murray, and Elwyn Brook Jones, Joan Winmill and Clive Morton head a useful and versatile supporting team. Moreover, the staging is elegant and enables it technically to compete against the best."

Picturegoer wrote: "Nonsense comedy? Yes, but made agreeable and entertaining by Guy Middleton, ideally cast as the asinine Murray."

TV Guide wrote, "silly comedy routines abound in this patented British farce."

Chibnall and McFarlane wrote in The British 'B' Film that Middleton "brought a touch of class" to the film.
