= Headline (film) =

- Directed by: John Harlow
- Written by: Kenneth Attiwill (novel); Ralph Gilbert Bettison; Maisie Sharman
- Produced by: John Corfield; Joseph Janni
- Starring: David Farrar; Anne Crawford; William Hartnell
- Cinematography: Geoffrey Faithfull
- Edited by: Francis Cockburn
- Music by: Percival Mackey
- Production company: John Corfield Productions
- Distributed by: Associated British Film Distributors
- Release date: 24 January 1944
- Running time: 75 minutes
- Country: United Kingdom
- Language: English

Headline is a 1944 British thriller film directed by John Harlow and starring David Farrar, Anne Crawford, William Hartnell and John Stuart. It was written by Ralph Gilbert Bettison and Maisie Sharman based on the 1933 novel Reporter! by Ken Attiwill. Its plot involves a crime reporter who searches for a mystery woman who has witnessed a murder.

== Plot ==
Crime reporter 'Brookie' Brooks is instructed by Ellington, his editor, to find the mystery woman who was in Paul Grayson's flat when Grayson murdered another woman. The mystery woman turns out to be Ellington's wife, and she is now being blackmailed by Grayson. Brooks uncovers the truth and succeeds in protecting Ellington from scandal.

== Cast ==
- David Farrar as 'Brookie' Brooks
- Anne Crawford as Anne
- John Stuart as L.B. Ellington
- William Hartnell as Dell (credited as Billy Hartnell)
- Antoinette Cellier as Mrs Margaret Ellington
- Anthony Hawtrey as Paul Grayson
- Richard Goolden as Arthur Jones
- Merle Tottenham as Mrs Deans
- Lorna Tarbat as Betty
- Joss Ambler as Chief Sub-Editor
- Nancy O'Neil as Molly Dean
- Elsie Wagstaff as Mrs Daly
- Ian McLean as Inspector Dodds
- Edgar Driver (uncredited) as photographer

== Production ==
It was shot at the Riverside Studios in Hammersmith. The film's sets were designed by the art director James Carter.

== Reception ==
The Monthly Film Bulletin wrote: "Ken Attiwill's novel The Reporter [sic] had a genuine newspaper office atmosphere, but this film, based on it, out-Hollywoods Hollywood in the opposite direction. Farrar and Anne Crawford in the leads and Richard Goolden as an eccentric oddity take acting honours, but the rest of the cast seem ill at ease under heavy-handed direction and rigid, discordant editing."

Kine Weekly wrote: "The treatment is rather lacking in punch, but dialogue is bright, comedy is prominent and the story is of the type to ensure a strong feminine interest. ... The story provides an illuminating example of the old adage 'where ignorance is bliss' and drives its point home in entertaining fashion. In execution it barely lives up to the vitality and power of its once-familiar American counterpart, but it is pleasing, often exciting and finishes up on a rousing note. Production qualities are very good and a fight between the reporter and the killer in a fast-moving train is both suspenseful and thrilling."
