= The Night Invader =

- From a feature on the film in Picturegoer (28 Nov 1942)
- Directed by: Herbert Mason
- Written by: Roland Pertwee; Brock Williams
- Based on: Rendezvous with Death by John Bentley
- Produced by: Max Milder
- Starring: Anne Crawford; David Farrar; Ronald Shiner
- Cinematography: Otto Heller
- Music by: Jack Beaver
- Production company: Warner Bros.
- Distributed by: Warner Bros. (UK)
- Release date: 5 December 1943 (United Kingdom)
- Running time: 81 minutes
- Country: United Kingdom
- Language: English
- Budget: £48,145
- Box office: £52,583

The Night Invader is a lost 1943 British black-and-white war film directed by Herbert Mason and starring Ronald Shiner, Anne Crawford and David Farrar. It was written by Roland Pertwee and Brock Williams based on the 1941 novel Rendezvous with Death by John Bentley, and produced by Max Milder for Warner Bros.–First National Productions Ltd. the British subsidiary of Warner Bros.

== Preservation status ==
The British Film Institute has classed The Night Invader as a lost film. Its National Archive holds a collection of stills but no film or video materials.

== Plot ==
Dick Marlow, a British agent, has parachuted into the occupied Netherlands to retrieve vital documents. Whilst on the trail of the papers, he poses occasionally as an American journalist and a Gestapo officer. He meets and falls in love with a Dutch woman who professes solidarity with the British, but matters become complicated and dangerous when it transpires that the woman's brother is in possession of the documents Dick Marlow needs, and is far less kindly disposed towards the British than his sister.

== Cast ==
- Anne Crawford as Karen Lindley
- David Farrar as Dick Marlow
- Sybille Binder as Baroness von Klaveren
- Carl Jaffe as Count von Biebrich
- Marius Goring as Oberleutnant
- Jenny Lovelace as Liesje von Klaveren
- Kynaston Reeves as Sir Michael
- George Carney as conductor
- Ronald Shiner as Witsen
- Martin Walker as Jimmy Archer

== Reception ==
The Monthly Film Bulletin wrote: "David Farrar rather steals this fast-moving and amusing film from Anne Crawford, while Karl Jaffe is excellent as a bombastic but blundering German colonel even if he slightly burlesques it. The finish is rather incredible, but the swift dialogue almost masks its weakness. A special word should be given to small-part actor George Carney who is superb as a train conductor."

Kine Weekly wrote: "The actual plot is somewhat stereotyped, but the director and principal players cunningly disarm criticism and give it pace and punch by successfully adopting tongue-in-the-cheek methods. Its exuberant sense of humour and its well-timed thrills and hair-raising aerial climax will get it over with the industrial masses and youngsters."

Picture Show wrote: "Somewhat lurid and unconvincing is this spy melodrama ... there's plenty of action and narrow escapes from death before the hero does his stuff and returns triumphant. Briskly directed, heartily acted."

Picturegoer wrote: "Conventional plot concerning the adventures of a young British secret agent whose work takes him to Holland and Paris. It has familiar undercover thrills of a popular order. It smacks of the old-time serial melodrama, but is well put over nonetheless. David Farrar is good in the lead, and Anne Crawford supplies glamour as the heroine."
