= Diamond City (film) =

1949 British film by David MacDonald

- Film poster
- Directed by: David MacDonald
- Screenplay by: Roland Pertwee
- Based on: story "Digger's Republic" by Roger Bray
- Produced by: Alex Bryce; A. Frank Bundy
- Starring: David Farrar; Honor Blackman; Diana Dors; Niall MacGinnis
- Cinematography: Reginald H. Wyer
- Edited by: Esmond Seal
- Music by: Clifton Parker
- Production company: Gainsborough Pictures
- Distributed by: General Film Distributors
- Release date: 21 September 1949
- Running time: 90 minutes
- Country: United Kingdom
- Language: English
- Box office: £97,000 (by 1953)

Diamond City is a 1949 British drama film directed by David MacDonald and starring David Farrar, Honor Blackman, Diana Dors and Niall MacGinnis. The screenplay was by Roland Pertwee based on the story "Digger's Republic" by Roger Bray.

== Plot ==
In 1870s South Africa, Englishman Stafford Parker tries to persuade Boer leader Jan Bloem to hand over control of a potential diamond field. This upsets Bloem's nephew Piet Quieman and businessman Muller; Muller has made his fortune through selling cheap rum to black workers.

New arrivals come to Hopetown: a missionary, Hart, and his daughter Mary, and David Raymond. A diamond is found on Bloem's territory. Parker persuades Bloem that he can maintain law and order and Bloem picks Parker over Piet and Muller.

Parker and a number of people from Hopetown set up a new establishment at Klipdrift. Muller tries to cause trouble but Parker beats him in a fight.

Klipdrift becomes a thriving town. David Raymond suspects Muller is buying diamonds directly from the natives, going around Parker's arrangement with Bloem. Eventually Parker confronts Muller who denies it.

Parker calls for a rule book to be drawn up and grows closer to Mary which causes saloon keeper Dora to be jealous.

Parker helps declare the first Diggers' Republic. Muller organises resistance but Parker defeats him. Parker realises that Mary has fallen for David. The diamond fields are annexed by Britain. Parker goes to seek gold in some nearby mountains, leaving Dora behind.

== Cast ==
- David Farrar as Stafford Parker
- Honor Blackman as Mary Hart
- Diana Dors as Dora
- Niall MacGinnis as Muller
- Andrew Crawford as David Raymond
- Mervyn Johns as Hart
- Phyllis Monkman as Ma Bracken
- Hal Osmond as Brandy Bill
- Bill Owen as Pinto
- Philo Hauser as Piet Quieman
- John Blythe as Izzy Cohen
- Dennis Vance as John Albert Rogers
- Norris Smith as Jan Bloem
- John Salew as Dr. Woods
- Tony Quinn as Vanderbyl
- Ronald Adam as Robert Southey
- Arthur Lane as Timothy Maxie
- Julian Somers as van Niekerk

== Production ==
=== Development ===
The film was based on the true story of Stafford Parker who was elected president of the Diamond Diggers Republic in 1871.

It was announced in 1945 as Digger's Rest and was to star Stewart Granger from director Leslie Arliss. "This Parker was a born fighter, a great, husky guy", said Arliss. "He'd knocked around in the States as a young man and was tremendously impressed by the sheriff system, as he'd seen it practiced in the West." Patricia Roc was to play the Salvation Army girl with whom Parker falls in love. However Roc was named in a divorce case involving Fay Compton and Gainsborough reportedly dropped her from the film as a result.

Eventually the make starring role was given to David Farrar who had received acclaim for his performance in Black Narcissus. It was directed by David MacDonald, who had just directed The Bad Lord Byron (1949) and Christopher Columbus (1949) for Gainsborough. Diana Dors played the role of the saloon keeper when Jean Kent was unavailable. It was Dors' biggest part to date. Dors says she was paid £30 under her contract to Rank and Farrar received £18,000 but she did not mind as it was "the biggest break of my career".

The film was seen as an attempt by producer Sydney Box to compete with Eureka Stockade (1949), another British film set and shot in a former colony.

=== Shooting ===
It combined location filming in the Kimberley region of South Africa with studio work at Denham Studios in England.

MacDonald arrived in South Africa in November 1948 for location filming. This was meant to take 25 days but MacDonald finished it in 12, due to him using only local crew. Studio work began at Denham in January 1949. The film's sets were designed by the art director George Provis.

Filming was held up when David Farrar fell ill.

Bombardier Billy Wells taught Farrar how to box for the film.

== Reception ==
=== Box office ===
The film's box office performance was poor.

=== Critical ===
Variety wrote "Production of open-air action dramas, with hard ridin’ and fightin’, is a new line for British studios. First adventure into this field fails to make the grade and its appeal is directed almost en-tirely to the unsophisticated."

The Monthly Film Bulletin wrote: "Saloon-bar brawls and Salvation Army meetings combine to make a lot of noise."

Filmink called it "a hilariously inept version of a fascinating true tale... with David Farrar as a gun-totin' Stafford Parker, Diana Dors and Honor Blackman perfectly cast if just five years older, and extremely dodgy racial politics (if you wonder why Farrar didn't become a star after Black Narcissus, this film is part of the reason)."

Michael Brooke wrote for BFI's Screenonline that the film "makes good use of [David Farrar's] particular brand of sensual virility as Stafford Parker'" and adds that "Diana Dors makes the most of one of her biggest roles to date... She pulls this off with surprising conviction".
