= David Farrar (actor) =

English actor (1908–1995)

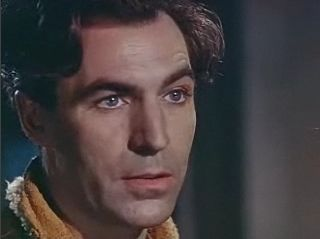
- Farrar in Black Narcissus (1947)
- Born: 21 August 1908; Forest Gate, Essex, England, UK
- Died: 31 August 1995 (aged 87); KwaZulu-Natal, South Africa
- Resting place: Ashes scattered into the Indian Ocean
- Years active: 1937–1962
- Spouse: Irene Elliot (m. 1929; died 1976)
- Children: 1

David Farrar (21 August 1908 – 31 August 1995) was an English stage and film actor.

His film roles include the male leads in the Powell and Pressburger films Black Narcissus (1947), The Small Back Room (1949) and Gone to Earth (1950). According to one obituary, "He was particularly adept at conveying the weaknesses and human qualities in figures of authority and intelligence ... and he could be considered an early exponent of 'anti-hero' roles." In 1949, exhibitors voted him the ninth-most popular British star.

Director Michael Powell once spoke of his handsome appearance and distinctive "violet eyes", and his exceptional timing in films. Powell also stated that had Farrar been more interested in cinema and cared more about his career, he could have been a much more high-profile actor, as successful as any.

== Career ==
Farrar was born in Forest Gate, Essex (now in the London Borough of Newham). He joined the Morning Advertiser on leaving school at 14 and worked as a journalist for a number of years. He became an assistant editor at 17 and earned a BA through night school when 19 whilst becoming increasingly interested in amateur theatricals.

=== Early years ===
In 1932 Farrar received an offer to tour with a repertory company at £7 a week. He quit his job and went on tour for 18 months. He ran a repertory company with his wife for 18 months until 1937, then went on tour again.

His first film role was in the Jessie Matthews musical Head Over Heels (1937). He also had small roles in Return of a Stranger (1937), Silver Top (1938), and A Royal Divorce (1938). He played agent Granite Grant in Sexton Blake and the Hooded Terror (1938) and had a small role in Q Planes (1939).

Farrar returned to the stage and performed in a production of the Wandering Jew for seven months. However, after a bomb damaged the theatre he decided to try films again.

=== Leading man ===
Farrar had his first leading role in Danny Boy (1941), which he followed with Sheepdog of the Hills (1941) and Suspected Person (1942). These were "B" movies but Farrar had a good role in an "A", Went the Day Well? (1942), as a villainous German.

He had strong roles in The Dark Tower (1943) and They Met in the Dark (1943), as well as the leads in Headline (1943) and The Night Invader (1944). He was a heroic commander of an air-sea rescue unit in For Those in Peril (1944), an accountant in The Hundred Pound Window (1944), and a pilot in The World Owes Me a Living (1945).

Farrar starred as Sexton Blake in two films, Meet Sexton Blake! (1945) and The Echo Murders (1945), and was an intelligence officer in Lisbon Story (1946). These low-budget thrillers were enormously popular in their day. By 1945 he was receiving 800 fan letters a week.

=== Stardom ===
Farrar was transformed into a star when he was cast as the British agent Mr. Dean in Black Narcissus (1947) who arouses the passions of the nuns played by Deborah Kerr and Kathleen Byron. Made by the team of Powell and Pressburger, the movie was popular and has since come to be regarded as one of the finest films in British cinema.

Farrar followed it up by playing the officer who brings home a German wife (Mai Zetterling) in Frieda (1947), directed by Basil Dearden; it was the ninth biggest film in Britain of the year.

Farrar played a charismatic school teacher in Mr. Perrin and Mr. Traill (1948) and was then reunited with Powell and Pressburger for The Small Back Room (1949) in which he played an alcoholic bomb disposal expert. According to his obituary, "Farrar was given a true star's entrance in the film, the camera tracking along a bar of customers until coming to rest upon the actor's back. His character's name is called and he turns to face the camera in full close-up."

Gainsborough Pictures next gave him the lead of a "British Western" shot in South Africa, Diamond City (1949), playing Stafford Parker, but the film was a flop. He reunited with Dearden for Cage of Gold (1950) and Powell and Pressburger for Gone to Earth (1950), another box office disappointment. Farrar would later cite his three films for Powell and Pressburger, and Cage of Gold, as the artistic highlights of his career. However Farrar's stardom soon lost momentum with the low-key films The Late Edwina Black (1951), and Night Without Stars (1951).

=== Hollywood ===
He was offered an heroic part in The Golden Horde (1951), at Universal with Ann Blyth, and the film was a minor hit. He was in I Vinti (1953) in Italy, then played villains in Hollywood films such as Duel in the Jungle (1954), and The Black Shield of Falworth (1954). He supported Anna Neagle in Lilacs in the Spring (1955) and was a supporting actor in Escape to Burma (1955), The Sea Chase (1955), and Pearl of the South Pacific (1956). Farrar returned to the UK for the lead in Lost (1956), and then was back to supporting parts in I Accuse! (1958), The Son of Robin Hood (1958), Watusi (1959), John Paul Jones (1959), and Solomon and Sheba (1959).

=== Final films ===
He returned to Britain for Beat Girl (1960), and The Webster Boy (1962), but following his role as Xerxes in The 300 Spartans (1962) he retired from the screen. Farrar later admitted, "I'd always been the upstanding young man and I was afraid of the parts that were being hinted at for uncles or for the girl's father instead of her lover! I just felt 'the hell with it all' and walked out into the sunset."

== Personal life ==
Farrar and Irene emigrated to Amanzimtoti, South Africa, in January 1970 to be closer to their daughter, Barbara. Barbara (with the surname Layne) was later the subject of the artist Tretchikoff's painting, Barbara in the Bath.

Irene died in 1976. Farrar died on 31 August 1995 in KwaZulu-Natal, South Africa, 10 days after his 87th birthday.

== Filmography ==
- Return of a Stranger (1937) – Dr. Young (uncredited)
- Silver Top (1938) – Babe
- A Royal Divorce (1938) – Louis Bonaparte
- Sexton Blake and the Hooded Terror (1938) – Granite Grant
- Q Planes (1939) – Viking Bo'sun (uncredited)
- Danny Boy (1941) – Harold Martin
- Sheepdog of the Hills (1941) – Reverend Michael Varney
- Penn of Pennsylvania (1941) – (uncredited)
- Suspected Person (1942) – Inspector Thompson
- Went the Day Well? (1942) – Lieut. Jung
- The Dark Tower (1943) – Tom Danton
- They Met in the Dark (1943) – Commander Lippinscott
- Headline (1943) – 'Brookie ' Brooks
- The Night Invader (1943) – Dick Marlow
- For Those in Peril (1944) – Flt.Lt. Murray
- The Hundred Pound Window (1944) – George Graham
- The World Owes Me a Living (1945) – Paul Collyer
- Meet Sexton Blake! (1945) – Sexton Blake
- The Echo Murders (1945) – Sexton Blake
- Lisbon Story (1946) – David Warren
- The Trojan Brothers (1946) – Sid Nichols
- Black Narcissus (1947) – Mr. Dean
- Frieda (1947) – Robert
- Mr. Perrin and Mr. Traill (1948) – David Traill
- The Small Back Room (1949) – Sammy Rice
- Diamond City (1949) – Stafford Parker
- Cage of Gold (1950) – Bill
- Gone to Earth (1950) (a.k.a. 'The Wild Heart') – Jack Reddin
- The Late Edwina Black (1951) – Gregory Black
- Night Without Stars (1951) – Giles Gordon
- The Golden Horde (1951) – Sir Guy of Devon
- I Vinti (1953)
- Duel in the Jungle (1954) – Perry Henderson / Arthur Henderson
- The Black Shield of Falworth (1954) – Gilbert Blunt, Earl of Alban
- Lilacs in the Spring (1954) – Charles King / King Charles II
- Escape to Burma (1955) – Cardigan
- The Sea Chase (1955) – Commander Jeff Napier
- Pearl of the South Pacific (1955) – Bully Hague
- Lost (1956) – Det. Insp. Craig
- The Battle of the River Plate (1956) – Narrator
- I Accuse! (1958) – Mathieu Dreyfus
- The Son of Robin Hood (1958) – Des Roches
- Watusi (1959) – Rick Cobb
- John Paul Jones (1959) – John Wilkes
- Solomon and Sheba (1959) – Pharaoh
- Beat Girl (1960) – Paul Linden
- The Webster Boy (1962) – Paul Webster
- The 300 Spartans (1962) – Xerxes (final film role)
