= Rossa Matilda Richter =

English aerialist and actor who became the first human cannonball

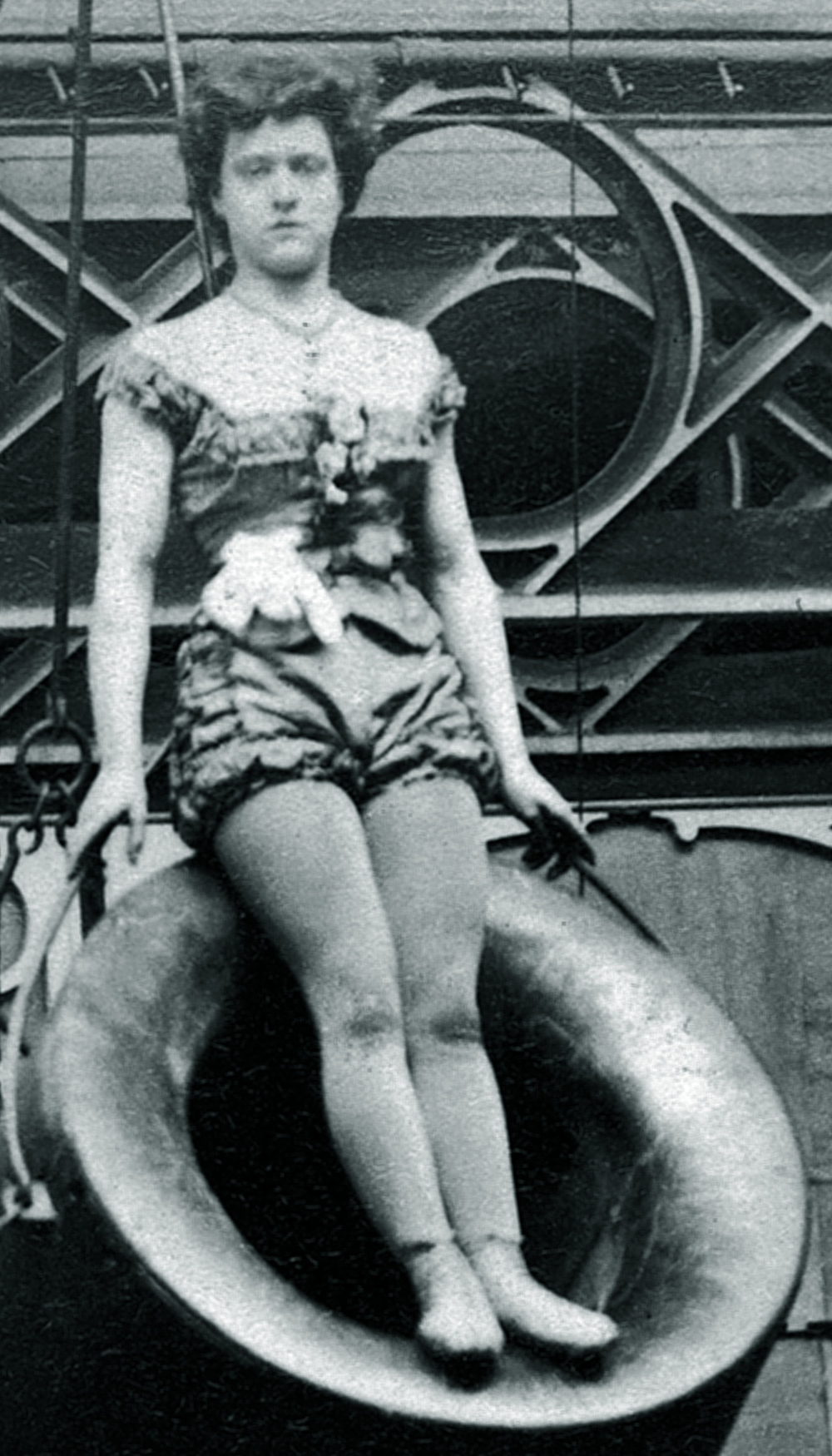
Zazel posing with her cannon at the Royal Aquarium, in 1877

Rossa Matilda Richter (7 April 1860 – 8 December 1937), who used the stage name Zazel, was an English aerialist and actress who became known as the first human cannonball at the age of 17. She began performing at a very young age, practicing aerial stunts like tightrope walking in an old London church. She took up ballet, gymnastics, and trapeze by the time she was 6 and, at 12, went on tour with a travelling acrobat troupe. In 1877, she was the first person to be fired out of a cannon, in front of a large crowd at the Royal Aquarium.

Journalists and the public voiced concerns for her safety from the time of her earliest appearances as Zazel. She was named by a lawmaker as one of the reasons for proposed legislation in England to prevent dangerous acrobatic stunts, leading her to take the show to the United States. She toured Europe and North America with circuses including Barnum & Bailey, executing tightrope, trapeze, and high dive routines in addition to the human cannonball. Throughout her career, she suffered several accidents and injuries, the most serious of which largely ended her career in 1891.

During time off from the circus, she started an opera company with her husband and took singing roles in some of its productions. She also volunteered time writing and holding exhibitions to promote the life-saving potential for safety nets.

== Early life ==
Richter was born in London in 1860 to a father from Dresden and a mother from Birmingham. Her father, Ernst Karl Richter, was a well known talent agent who supplied performers and animals to circuses and other productions. Her mother, Susanne Richter, was a dancer in a circus. She was the second of at least four children. As a child, she was taught how to fall before she was taught how to perform, practising in an old condemned church in London, where her wire stretched from the chancel down through the nave to the gallery, and her nets spread below.

She began her performance career at the age of four or five, playing one of Cinderella's sisters in a pantomime at the Raglan Music Hall. She was only filling in for another child who had fallen ill, but according to the New York Clipper, "she filled the role so well that she became a favorite" and gave a series of additional performances at the Drury Lane theatre. She received ballet lessons from a respected instructor and subsequently took up gymnastics, learning from teachers named Stergenbach and the Levanti brothers. She also became active as a trapeze artist from the time she was six years old, performing for the first time at Garrick Theatre in Whitechapel. She became known for a "leap-for-life" stunt on the trapeze which she performed throughout her career. During some of these early performances, she used the stage name La Petite Lulu.

When she was twelve, she joined a travelling Japanese or Siamese acrobat troupe, with whom she honed her balancing skills that she would rely upon throughout her circus career. They travelled to put on shows in Dublin, Marseille, and Toulouse. Although she was English, a contemporary article in the Clipper said "she was known as the only Japanese girl that ever visited Europe, and received many medals as rewards for her daring and skill." During the show in Toulouse, she suffered the first of many accidents during a performance, falling during a trapeze act. Her injury was severe enough that it took her away from performing for a short time. According to her father, it was because he would not sanction further performances. Richter returned home to London in 1873.

== Human cannonball at the Royal Aquarium ==
The young lady crawls into a huge mortar—a most realistic-looking weapon—with the greatest nonchalance, and, instead of shuddering, we applaud most heartily, and then proceed to watch and to wait with almost breathless eagerness. We follow the progress of the torch for a moment only. We listen to the loud report which follows its application to the powder, and lo! our vision is startled by the sight of a living missile flying through space, and alighting safe and sound in the huge net spread to receive her. Before the smoke has cleared from the vast mouth of the cannon whence she has come she has made her way along the net, and is bowing and smiling upon the stage.

— The Era, as quoted in the New York Clipper, 6 October 1877

The human cannonball act was conceived by William Leonard Hunt, a Canadian daredevil who went by the name "The Great Farini." He was known both for his own high wire performances, such as when he crossed Niagara Falls, and for the high-profile performers he managed. Before Richter, Farini's best known act was his adopted son Samuel Wasgate. Starting in 1870, Farini dressed him in women's clothing and began advertising performances for "The Beautiful Lulu the girl Aerialist and Circassian Catapultist." The Lulu act was very successful and became known for stunts which involved Wasgate being launched by catapult, either into a net or up to a trapeze. It was not until a serious accident sent him to the hospital that his true identity became known. Lulu's catapult act led Farini to conceive of a cannon-based act. In 1871, years before its first public display, he filed a patent in the US for "certain new and useful Apparatus for Projecting Persons and Articles into or through the Air." When the Royal Aquarium in London hired him to improve its profitability, he did so through spectacular acts like the human cannonball.

Ernst Richter was familiar with Farini and, years prior, had sworn that he "should never have a dog of mine, much less a daughter, for his dangerous performances." He added, "What, indeed, would the Society for the Prevention of Cruelty to Animals say to Farini firing off even a donkey from a cannon?" Suzanne Richter was not so protective, however, and Ernst said she misled him into signing an agreement that he believed would be with one of his friends, not Farini, and would only have Rossa singing and dancing.

In April 1877, the 17-year-old Richter became known in Europe as the first human cannonball, performing as "Zazel, the Beautiful Human Cannonball," although Hunt's son "Lulu" had been performing the human cannonball act since 1873. The Mackay Mercury wrote that the event "hurled her from the jaws of death into the arms of fame." She was fired out of a spring-style cannon, before travelling through the air and landing in a net. Accounts of the event vary on the distance she traveled, citing between 6.1 metres (20 ft) and 21.3 metres (70 ft). The cannon used rubber springs to limit the distance she would travel. Although Farini had filed another patent in England in 1875 (and in the US in 1879) for an "adaptation [of the cannon] so as to use explosives as a means for releasing the catch," he was already using a gunpowder-based explosion for effect during the show.

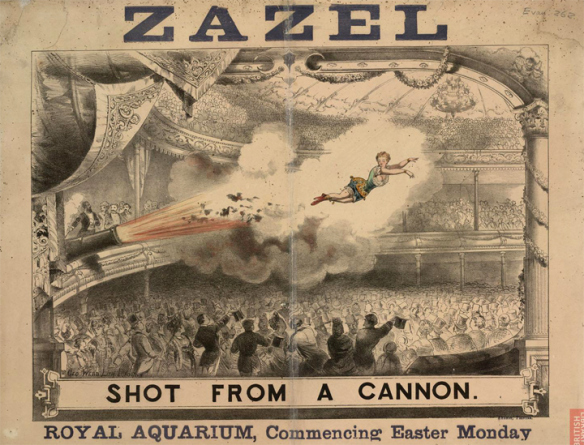
An early poster advertising Zazel's performances at the Royal Aquarium

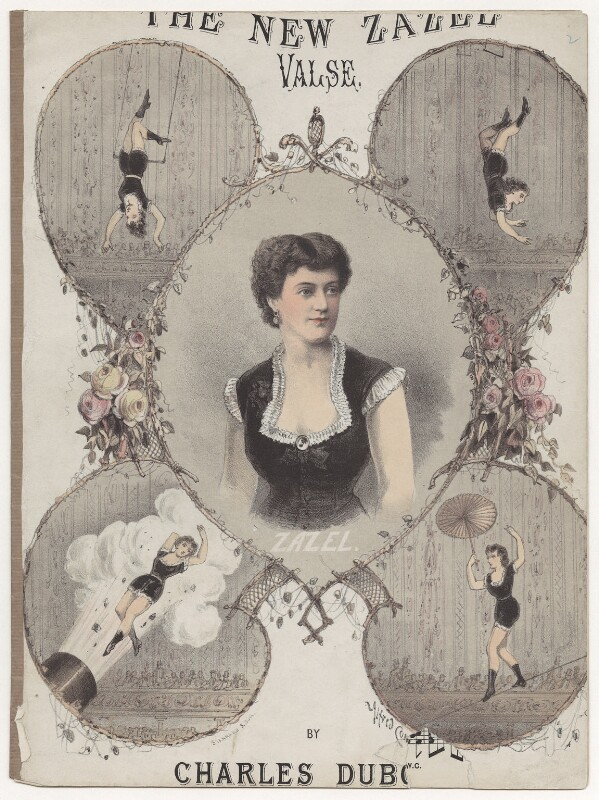
A poster by Alfred Concanen advertising "The New Zazel" waltz composed by Charles Dubois

Most sources, including the Guinness Book of World Records, cite Richter as the first human cannonball. However, the claim has been contested by others who claim that "The Australian Marvels," Ella Zuila and George Loyal, performed the act a few years earlier. Zuila and Loyal were hired by Adam Forepaugh, an American circus owner who learned that his rival, Barnum, might bring Richter to North America. The duo were a featured attraction in Forepaugh's circus and drew comparisons to Richter for their similar aerial stunts. Their cannonball stunts differed somewhat in that rather than being fired from a cannon into a net, Loyal was projected from the cannon and caught by Zuila, who would be hanging upside down with her knees over the bar of a trapeze.

Richter was featured at the Aquarium for an extended period of time, performing sometimes twice in a day and often to a full room of people. A single performance could draw tens of thousands. Farini also took her to perform at other venues in western Europe. Louis Cooke wrote in The Billboard that "the breathless silence that always preceded the act while it was being prepared only added to its intensity, and the graceful bow of the young lady who had the temerity and muscular strength to withstand the shock and presence of mind to guide her flight never failed to receive a round of rapturous applause." After seeing it multiple times, a writer for The Illustrated Sporting and Dramatic News wrote a gushing review of the act in the 26 May 1877 issue. It praised "her unhesitating confidence, the graceful ease and swiftness of her motions, together with her placidly smiling face, [which] destroy all sense of fear for her safety in the minds of the audience, and enable them to enjoy the spectacle of her extraordinary agility, strength, and seemingly terribly daring feats, with none but pleasurable, although strongly excited sensations." The author went on to describe the mix of anxiety and delight an audience member should expect to experience, and noted that Richter counted among her fans future king Edward VII, who reportedly attended two of her shows when he was Prince of Wales.

Music often accompanied her performances. At the Aquarium, musical director Charles Dubois composed waltzes for her, which featured prominently in some of the show's advertising. Farini also wrote a song, "Zazel," which was sung by George Leybourne and published by Musical Bouquet.

The human cannonball was not her only act. She began performing a high dive at around the same time, also at the Aquarium. For that stunt, she would make repeated jumps from a raised platform into a net, gradually increasing the distance until she reached a peak of 29.6 metres (97 ft). The West Australian wrote that she would start atop the proscenium arch, fall 27.4 metres (90 ft) into the net, then pop up to smile at the audience. She also walked the tightrope, increasing the difficulty by sometimes forgoing the standard balancing pole. She would also include tricks such as running, standing on one foot, putting baskets on her feet, lying down or sitting on the wire, and spinning around while holding it with her knees. The Era wrote that the dive was "astounding" and that "she is wonderfully clever and graceful" on the tightrope.

== Accidents and public response ==
This ought not to be permitted in a country calling itself civilised. We complain of the Spaniards attending bull-fights, and yet what does a matador, a picador, or a bandillero do, but place himself in a position in which he pins his safety on his skill? Were, however, in Spain children to be hired by speculators and forced to fight in the bull-ring, there would be a universal outcry. And yet we in England allow—nay, we patronise—the exhibition of a child precipitating herself from a great height, or being shot from a cannon for the benefit of a speculator.

— Truth, 22 May 1879

Once the human cannonball act started and became popular, people began protesting the perceived danger of the show and tried unsuccessfully to have it stopped. Concerned complaints made their way to the Home Secretary, Richard Assheton Cross, who told the Aquarium's manager, Wybrow Robertson, that he would be accountable should an accident befall Richter. In response, Robertson invited Cross to be fired out of the cannon himself.

Richter's first human cannonball accident was at the Aquarium, followed by another in Portsmouth in 1879, where the net used to catch her was rotten due to wear and she fell through. Though she did not break any bones, her condition was serious enough that she could not perform the next day. The Citizen wrote about the outrage expressed at the apparently sloppy safety checks that had missed the poor condition of the net: "If the public demands such sickening exhibitions ... then most certainly it is the bounden duty of those in authority to see that the precaution is a reality, and not a farce." The Graphic insisted, "When will the Home Secretary be made to see the necessity of putting some restraint upon the suicidal sensational acrobatic feats, which are now, to our shame, be it said, so popular?" An 1880 issue of The Orchestra likewise scolded audiences, saying that these acts "prove the morbid taste of the public who delight in such exhibitions."

After the Portsmouth accident, Ernst Richter went to the office of the periodical Truth to talk to one of its writers. It had published the opinion that someone ought to prevent her from performing such a dangerous act, and Ernst came to ask them how he could do just that. He was afraid for her safety and wanted to get her away from Farini and his stunts. By that time, Ernst had left the entertainment business, worked as an engineer, and had separated from Susanna, with whom Rossa lived and who raised no such objections to the potential for danger. Ernst said that "the newspapers say that someone ought to interfere to hinder her from risking her life for money. I am her father, and want to interfere ... When the cannon is fired off, her limbs have to be rigid. If by mistake it is fired one moment too soon, she might be killed. When she takes her dive, if she did not fall lightly, she would break a limb; and if the net underneath is rotten, as it was at Portsmouth, she might be killed." The Truth reporter admitted he did not know much about the law, but said he should talk to a magistrate to ask how to get an injunction, opining that the justice system should indeed "prevent girls and children from risking their limbs in order that, with or without the consent of their parents, their task-masters may deserve profit."

Later the same year, on 15 December 1879, she fell during a trapeze performance in Chatham, Kent. The New York Clipper reported that the net seemed not to be much protection in the spot she landed, and she "was in an apparently senseless condition", exclaiming "I am killed, I am killed!" as she was taken away from the performing area. She was not found to be seriously injured and later performed again with her hands bandaged, "and evidently suffering from great nervousness."

In 1880 Edward Jenkins brought the Acrobats and Gymnasts' Bill to the House of Commons, which aimed to prevent dangerous acrobatic stunts. There was some push-back to the idea based on the notion that it might also prohibit less dangerous acrobatic performances, to which Jenkins clarified that it really had a handful of performers in mind, including Zazel. There was extended debate across two parliaments, much of it focused on how to draw the line between dangerous and acceptable acts. Many years later, Richter gave her opinion of the legal interventions in an interview with John Squire, eventually published in Solo & Duet: "A lot of those interfering men in Parliament started a committee about it and they passed a law forbidding me to do it. Oh, I was wretched! ... I loved it. They'd just no right to take away me living if I loved it. I was ambitious. I wanted to be great. You see, it was me art."

== Touring with Barnum & Bailey and other circuses ==
The relationship between Richter and Farini was nearer to manager-employee than collaborators, and Farini kept most of the earnings from the lucrative shows, amounting to 120–200 pounds sterling per week. In 1879, a reporter observed that when travelling to different venues, she did so with a normal train ticket: "it might have been supposed that those who derive rich benefits from the clever but dangerous performances ... would have paid for her the very small difference between a first- and second-class ticket from Sloane Square to St. James's Park." According to P. T. Barnum, who had travelled to London to see the performance, Richter pleaded with him to take her away. She was upset at the small share of money she received from Farini, when she was the star of the act and took the physical risks.

Farini made it well known that the Zazel act belonged to him, publicizing notices to that effect. When Richter began asking for more money, he secretly began training additional young women to perform as Zazel. It is unclear when and to what extent the other "Zazels" performed, but the number of acts using that name became common enough that Richter began to refer to herself as "the original Zazel."

In 1880, during proceedings concerning the Acrobats and Gymnasts' Bill, Farini and Richter left England. She performed with the Barnum & Bailey Circus for a season, performing in France and then the United States. Her 8 April 1880 debut in New York "was in every way successful, and received fervid applause," according to the Clipper. Though she was best known as a human cannonball, Richter continued to perform other aerial acts, like the high dive and trapeze. She returned to Europe with Farini in November 1881, stayed a short time, and returned to the United States in 1882, touring with John B. Doris's Inter-Ocean Show.

== Opera ==
Richter married George Oscar Starr, who worked as a press agent for Barnum; and, together, they took some time away from the circus. Among other activities, they launched the Starr Opera Company in 1886. They intended it to be accessible to a popular audience, and even staged a concert for people incarcerated at Michigan State Prison. Though she was not previously known for singing, it had been reported that she sang a song called "It Is So Easy" after certain circus performances. She played various parts in comic opera, including a performances as Regina in La princesse de Trébizonde and Eliza in Billee Taylor, or The Reward of Virtue. According to the Clipper, she "showed that she had not only an excellent voice, but the grace and action which only long experience and study can give the artist."

== Return to circus life and public safety education ==
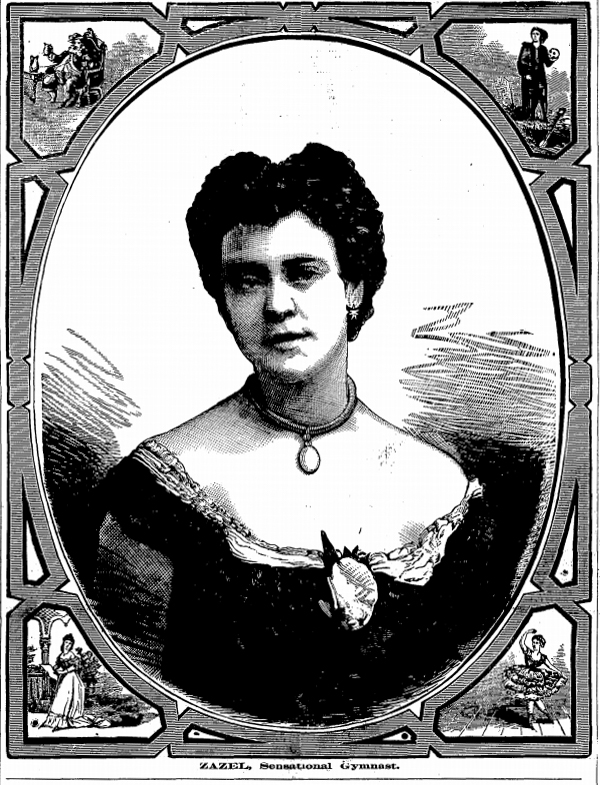
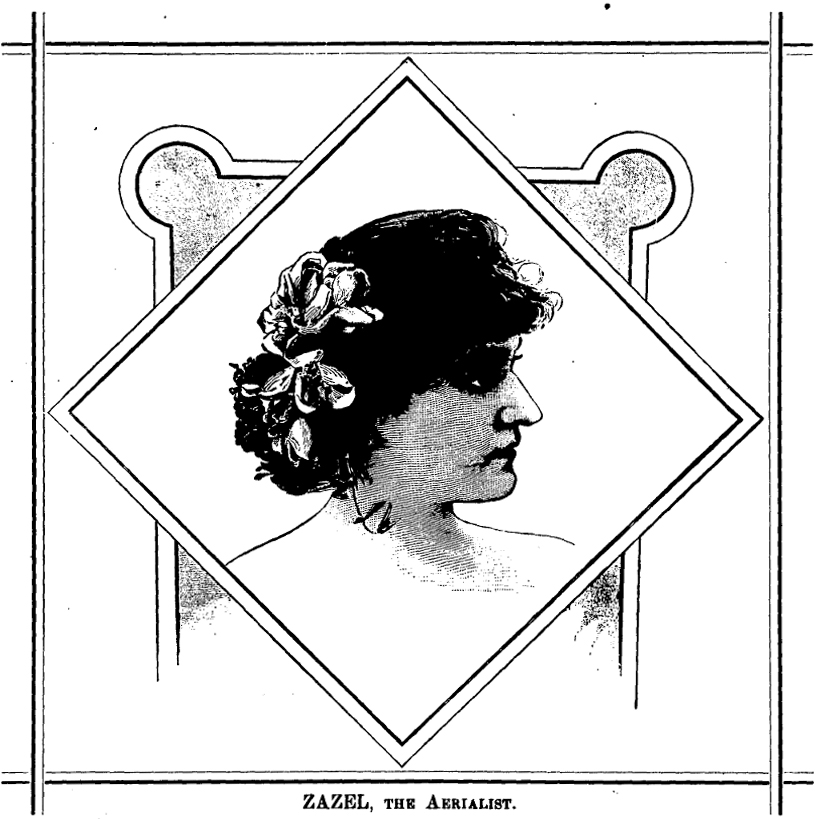
Portraits of Richter on the cover of New York Clipper in October 1877 (left) and May 1888 (right).

When George Starr was offered a position as managing director of Barnum & Bailey, she decided to reenter circus life. She also began using her expertise to educate the public and public safety workers about the usefulness and potential of safety nets, for example to catch people jumping out of burning buildings. Dressed in normal clothing, including jewellery and a hat, she would throw herself out of a building window into a net. An 1892 edition of The West Australian describes one such exhibition: "There was never a more fearless woman gymnast than this Zazel, who jumped nonchalantly from a fourth storey window into a net to illustrate the possibilities of the net as a means of saving life. She tied a stout cord about her skirts, and throwing her head up and backward, she sprang to the centre of the net as confidently and as gracefully as my lady springs from her carriage."

She volunteered her time to advocate for the use of nets as life-saving tools for several years. In addition to performing stunts, she wrote on the subject for people who live in large buildings and worked with The Evening Sun to publicise her ideas, sparking conversation throughout the US. According to the Clipper, "she received the thanks of the New York Fire Department for her bravery and advice, and the press unite in editorially praising her actions."

In 1891, while touring the United States with Adam Forepaugh's circus, she nearly died during a show in New Mexico. She performed with the cannon as well as on a tight wire. The wire was about 40 feet off the ground, running from the side of the circus tent to two poles braced together in the centre, fit with a platform. According to a witness interviewed in the Mackay Mercury, the poles were supposed to be fastened together with a steel band, but it was accidentally left off. When she was out on the wire, starting to put up an umbrella, she signalled to her coworkers, who thought she wanted them to tighten the wire. When they did so, the poles came apart and Richter fell to the ground. She landed on her hands and knees, and one of the poles fell on her back. When the poles were moved and someone picked her up, her body could not straighten out. Two men pulled her shoulders and legs to straighten out her appearance. The crowd panicked and she was heard screaming. The witness said it was "the most horrible accident I ever witnessed ... and I have seen a good many accidents in my day." She had broken her back. Local medical professionals provided short-term treatment before she was taken to facilities in New York. The accident effectively retired her from her circus career, and she spent several months in a suspended full body cast.

== Later life ==
At some point, Rossa and her husband moved back to England, living in a house in Upper Norwood. He died in 1915 and requested that his ashes be spread to the "four winds" on the boat ride between the UK and US. British laws did not allow it, but she fulfilled his request secretly the following year, and then returned to England. In an update in a 1933 issue of The Bystander, she said that she was living on her own in Southern England, enjoying playing roulette when she had the opportunity. She died on 8 December 1937 at Camberwell House hospital in Peckham.

== Image and legacy ==
[Richter] and all the Female Blondins and the flying trapeze artistes laid the foundations for female performers in the circus. At the end of the eighteenth century, women had first taken part in the circus as equestriennes or as dancers and singers. No longer would they be limited to such acts or as mere decoration; now they could contend equally in dangerous and daring acts, performing as well as any man. Just as the rights for women grew throughout the century, so too did the involvement of women in circus.

— Steve Ward, Sawdust Sisterhood: How Circus Empowered Women (2017)

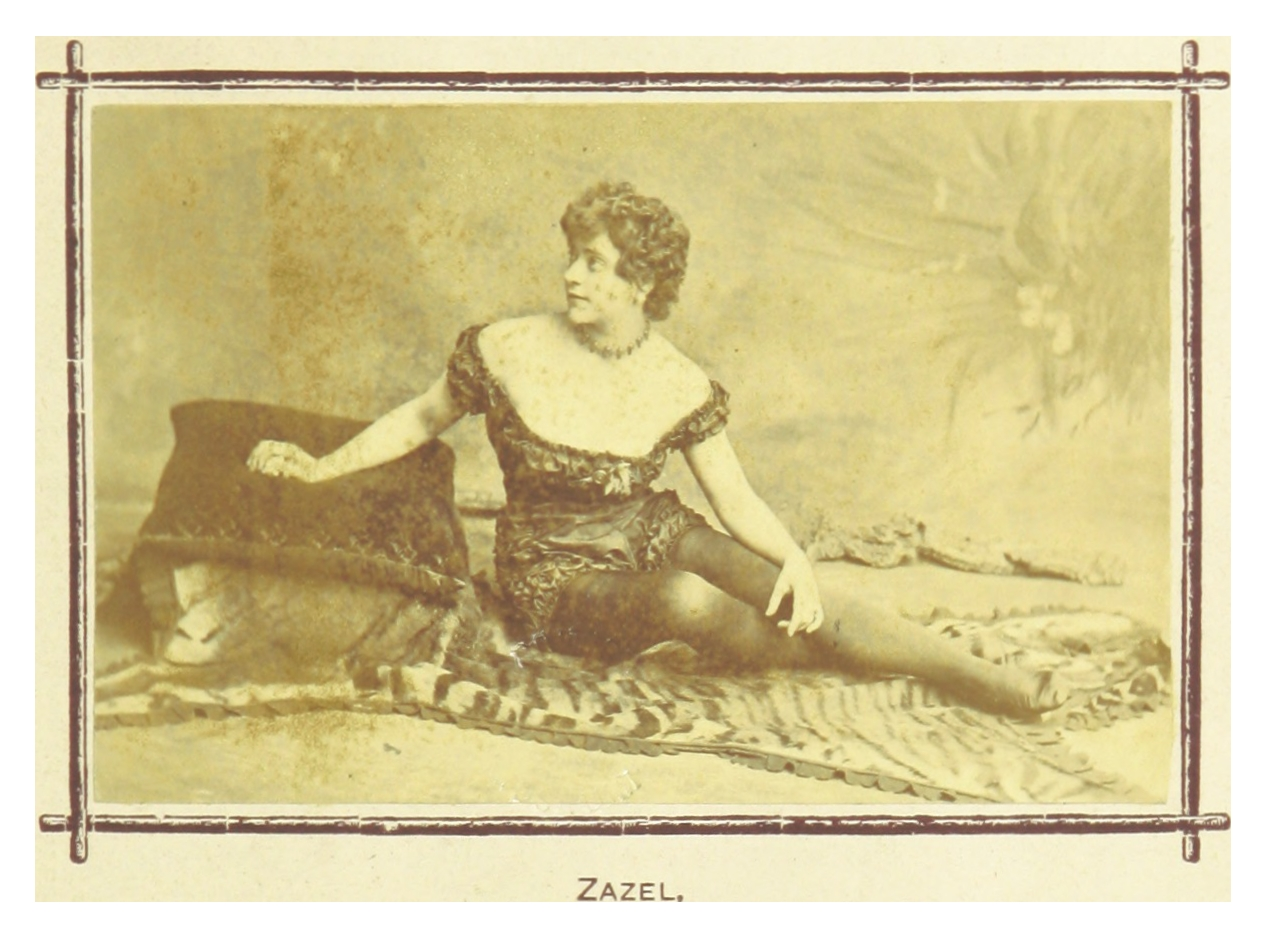
Richter in 1879, depicted in a London travel guide

Press coverage of Richter's performances remarked on the impressive spectacle of the act and her fearlessness and athleticism. The West Australian wrote that "there was never a more fearless woman gymnast" and said that "fear was to her an unknown quantity". That she also jumped out of buildings to demonstrate the functionality of a safety net further established that she was brave even outside of the confines of a circus tent. The Clipper said that "personally Zazel is bright, intelligent and noted for her acts of charity."

Though young, Richter was sexualised in advertising materials from the time of her earliest Zazel performances. Whereas The Illustrated Sporting and Dramatic News explained that women may appreciate her athleticism, it also provided several descriptions of her "most perfect" figure. Brian Tyson speculated that, looking at the advertising materials, some of the act's appeal may have been because "in order to fit into the cannon, she had to shed most of her Victorian clothing." The painter George Frederic Watts asserted both that she was "the bravest woman I ever saw" and that her "form [was] the most perfect he ever saw." When Watts asked her to sit for a portrait, her sister came along as a chaperone. Richter told The Bystander that at some point she asked her manager, likely Farini, whether she should donate Watts' portrait to the National Portrait Gallery. "He just laughed and said 'whatever would they want in the National Gallery with a picture of you!'". As of 2018 the Gallery has three portraits of her in its collections: two lithographs by Alfred Concanen and another by an unknown artist.

According to historians Janet Davis and Peta Tait, circus performers like Richter challenged stereotypes of femininity through acts that demonstrated unabashed feats of strength and agility. Some began to think she was actually a man dressed like a woman. Tait argued that the cannon spectacle, typically at the end of a show, served not only to provide a powerful conclusion but also to balance her other acts' more physical displays of athleticism with a more feminised, relatively passive helplessness — "a beautiful lady shot from a monstrous cannon." Shane Peacock's description of the show also highlights this dynamic: "Farini stood at the cannon, looking evil in his black beard, commanding the sweet, beautiful young Zazel to enter the mortar, and lighting the fuse to a great flourish, sending her across the [Aquarium's] great hall into a net of his own invention." A commentator wrote extensively about her talents, appearance, and personality, saying that "her nature was as pure and sunshiny as her face and form were beautiful." Elaborating on her "purity," it went on to say that "princes sought her favor, but Zazel remained the pure girl and woman that she is today. Her purity was recognised by Queen Victoria." Circus promoters highlighted their female stars' domesticity so as not to be seen as too revolutionary in terms of women's equality. Interviewers asked Richter about circus life, and her marriage to Starr facilitated discussion of the wholesome, quasi-traditional lives of the performers. She told one interviewer, speaking for women in the circus in general, that "the domestic instinct is very strong among circus women, for the reason that they are deprived of home life a great part of every year. She finds an outlet in many little ways, one of which is an appeal to the chef in charge of the dining car to be allowed to bake a cake." Combining statements about female performers' strength with flattering descriptions of their beauty and figure may have served a similar balancing function.

Richter's cannon act inspired a scene in the Henry James Byron burlesque, Little Doctor Faust, when it played at the Gaiety Theatre. Nellie Farren's titular character would climb into a cannon, escaping through a hidden trap door in the stage while her costar, Edward O'Connor Terry, used a ramrod to simulate preparing the cannon to fire. After an explosion, she would run back in from the other side of the stage. This act, too, met with an accident when the trap door failed to open. When her costar began to use the ramrod, he realised he was hitting her rather than the cannon interior. Improvising, Terry asked "Are you in? Are you far in? Are you nearly far in?", a pun based on her name, "Nellie Farren." The scene as well as Terry's ad lib received such a strong response that they were retained in future performances.

Young Man's Fancy, a 1939 British comedy film written and directed by Robert Stevenson and co-written by Roland Pertwee, featured a character based on Richter. Anna Lee played the role, Ada, an Irish human cannonball.

== See also ==
- Dolly Shepherd
- Edith Maud Cook
