= E. V. H. Emmett =

British newsreader and narrator (1902–1971)

E. V. H. Emmett as himself in The Arsenal Stadium Mystery (1939)

Edward Victor Henry Emmett, known as E. V. H. Emmett (17 June 1902, London – 7 June 1971, London), was a British newsreader. Though his main job was as a commentator for Gaumont British News, he was frequently used as a narrator for films from the 1930s to 1950s. In the first series of Dad's Army broadcast in 1968 he was the narrator over the humorous short Public Information Films of the platoon seen at the beginning of each episode. By the time of the colour episodes in 1969 the films had been discontinued.

Emmett was born in Brixton in London in 1902, the son of Elizabeth Annie née Denyer (1871–) and Josephus Walter Victor Emmett (1872–1941), an insurance clerk. In addition to his work as a narrator Emmett was also a screenwriter for Under the Southern Cross (1957), Dance Hall (1950), Bothered by a Beard (1945, which he also produced and directed), The Lion Has Wings (1939) and Sabotage (1936), along with additional dialogue for Young Man's Fancy (1940), The Ware Case (1938) and Non-Stop New York (1937).

He married Ethel M Stanton (1897–) in 1929 in London. In 1939 the couple were living in Marylebone in London. The marriage was later dissolved. In 1949 he married Joyce Annette Stanley (1917–1997) in London.

E. V. H. Emmett lived at 4 Montpelier Court on Montpelier Road in Ealing, London W.5. On his death in Ealing in 1971 he left £624 in his will.

== Filmography ==
Narrator unless otherwise noted.

Year	Title	Role	Notes
1934	The Camels Are Coming	Commentator	
1937	Non-Stop New York		
1937	Wings of the Morning	Racing Commentator	
1938	The Ware Case		
1939	The Lion Has Wings	Narrator	UK version
1939	The Arsenal Stadium Mystery	Himself	
1940	For Freedom	Ted / Commentator	
1940	Sailors Three	Newsreel Commentator	Voice, Uncredited
1940	Civilian Front	Commentary	Short documentary
1943	Get Cracking	Commentator	Voice
1944	On Approval	Narrator	Voice
1946	Bothered by a Beard	Director, writer, narrator, producer	
1948	Easy Money	Commentary	
1949	Passport to Pimlico	Newsreel Commentator	Uncredited
1951	The Galloping Major	Narrator	Uncredited
1956	Private's Progress	Narrator	Voice, Uncredited
1958	Skyport	Narrator	Documentary
1959	Invitation to Monte Carlo	Narrator	Documentary
1959	Look at Life	Himself	Documentary short
1959	I'm All Right Jack	Narrator	Voice, Uncredited
1963	Billy Liar	Newsreel Commentator	Uncredited
1964	Carry On Cleo	Narrator	Voice
