= The Camels Are Coming =

The Camels Are Coming may refer to:

- The Camels Are Coming, a 1932 Biggles book
- The Camels Are Coming (film), a 1934 British comedy adventure
