= Jeffrey Byron =

American actor and writer (born 1955)

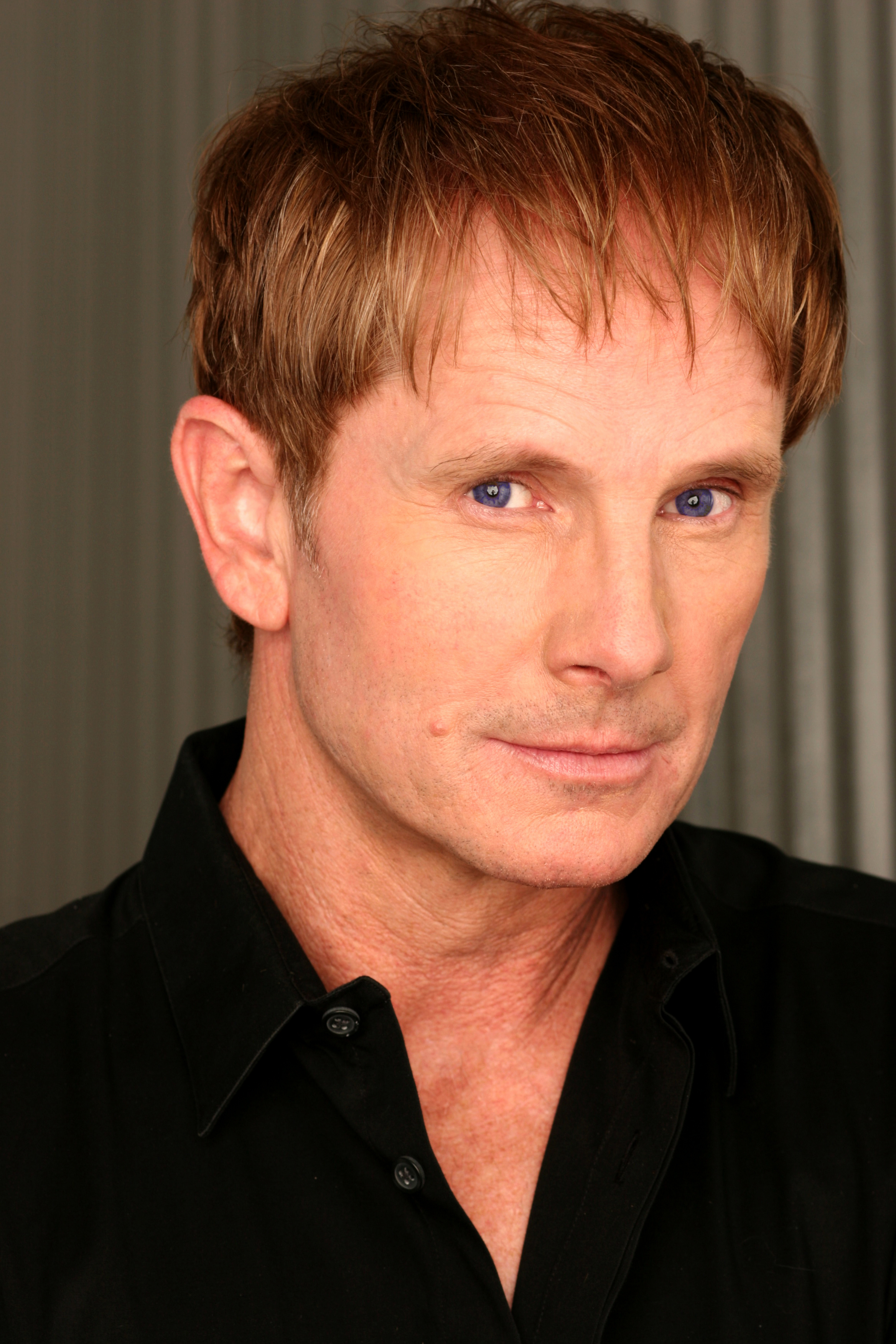
- Byron in 2007
- Born: Timothy Paul Stafford; November 28, 1955 (age 70); Santa Monica, California, U.S.
- Occupations: Actor; screenwriter
- Years active: 1963–present
- Spouses: Gail O'Grady (m. 1990; div. 1991) Lana Krol (m. 2005; div. 2010)
- Children: 1
- Parent(s): Anna Lee; George Stafford
- Relatives: Venetia Stevenson (half-sister); Edan Everly (half-nephew)
- Website: jbyronphotoartist.com

Jeffrey Byron (born Timothy Paul Stafford; November 28, 1955) is an American actor and writer. Byron has acted in both film and television, and co-wrote one movie script, The Dungeonmaster.

Byron was born in Santa Monica, California, the third son of English actress Anna Lee by her second husband, George Stafford. He appeared at the 31st Emmy Award ceremony (1979), accepting his mother's lifetime achievement award. In 1964 he appeared in "The Bewitchin' Pool", the last original broadcast episode of The Twilight Zone.

== Appearances in television ==
- The Bold and the Beautiful (2002)
- Port Charles (1997–2000)
- Lois & Clark: The New Adventures of Superman (1997)
- Matlock (1991)
- Baywatch (1989)
- One Life to Live as Richard Abbott #4 (1986–1987)
- T. J. Hooker (1986)
- Wonder Woman (1979)
- Dallas (1978)
- Eight Is Enough (1977–1980)
- McMillan & Wife (1976)
- The Young and the Restless (1973)
- All My Children as Dr. Jeff Martin #5 (1986)
- Bonanza (1966)
- The Twilight Zone (1964) - (Episode - "The Bewitchin' Pool")
- The Fugitive (1964)

== Appearances in film ==
- Star Trek (2009)
- Oh Baby (2008)
- Women on Top (2007)
- Bionic Ever After? TV (1994)
- Family Album TV (1994)
- Falling Down uncredited (1993)
- Pulse Pounders (1988)
- The Dungeonmaster (1985)
- Metalstorm: The Destruction of Jared-Syn (1983)
- Starting Fresh TV (1979)
- Love's Savage Fury TV (1979)
- The London Connection (1979)
- International Velvet (1978)
- The Seniors (1978)
- Legend of the Northwest (1978)
- Nickelodeon (1978)
- At Long Last Love (1975)
- Hot Rods to Hell (1967)
- Donovan's Reef (1963)
