= Bothered by a Beard =

1946 British film by E.V.H. Emmett

- Directed by: E.V.H. Emmett
- Screenplay by: E.V.H. Emmett
- Produced by: E.V.H. Emmett
- Starring: Jerry Verno; Tod Slaughter; John Salew
- Edited by: W.T. Rowe
- Music by: Bretton Byrd
- Production company: Gaumont British Instructional
- Release date: 1946
- Running time: 35 minutes
- Country: United Kingdom
- Language: English

Bothered by a Beard is a 1946 British short black-and-white semi-documentary comic film directed and written by E.V.H. Emmett and starring Jerry Verno, Tod Slaughter and John Salew. It was produced by Emmett for Gaumont British Instructional.

== Plot ==
The film is a semi-documentary focusing on the safety razor, in the context of a comic history of shaving. Emmett narrates aspects of shaving from the Bronze Age, through Ancient Egypt and to Victorian England. The latter features the fictional barber Sweeney Todd. The film then presents the development of King C. Gillette's 1870s invention, and includes shots of the Gillette company's Art Deco headquarters in Hounslow, west London.

== Cast ==
- Jerry Verno as sailor
- Tod Slaughter as Sweeney Todd
- John Salew as man in bath
- Franklyn Bennett
- Dorothy Bramhall
- Anthony Baird
- Arthur Denton
- Desmond Roberts
- Clifford Buckton
- Howard Douglas
- Van Boolen

== Reception ==
The Monthly Film Bulletin wrote: "This is Emmett's first work since leaving newsreel and it shows the jerky haphazardness of his earlier experience. He has inventiveness, but his faulty sense of timing leads to labouring of many points. He should improve with further feature worl and with the realisation that independent scripting and editing bring not only specialised skill into these departments, but individual judgments to the work as a whole."

Kine Weekly called the film a "cheery extravaganza: a skittish testimony to Gillette, inventor of the safety razor," adding: "The advertising matter is humorously concealed in a series of light illustrations of the weapons with which men have battled with beards. E.V.H. Emmett, of newsreel fame, is responsible for the laughable, though slightly erratic, novelty. ... True, the exhibitor is usually paid for showing advertising films, but we'll let that pass. Incidentally, its 'A' certificate, obviously given because of the Sweeney Todd sequence, is further proof that British film censorship lacks a sense of humour."

The Daily Film Renter wrote: "This novel, informative and amusing record of man's struggle with his beard through the ages should be well received in every class of kinema, and the uncommonly well-written and effectively delivered commentary be particularly appreciated."

Picture Show wrote: "Tracing, with some humour, the development of the means by which man indulged his wish to shave from the Dark Ages down to the invention of the safety razor, this unpretentious little film gives us a detailed survey of the manufacture of razor blades, and finishes with a ponderous and pointless bath episode that detracts considerably from its previous merits."

== Home media ==
The film is included as an extra on the Blu-ray The Criminal Acts of Tod Slaughter: Eight Blood-and-Thunder Entertainments, 1935–1940 (Powerhouse Films, 2023).
