= King Solomon's Mines (1937 film) =

- Film poster
- Directed by: Robert Stevenson (lead); Geoffrey Barkas (African exteriors)
- Screenplay by: Michael Hogan; Roland Pertwee (dialogue); Charles Bennett (uncredited); A. R. Rawlinson (uncredited); Ralph Spence (uncredited)
- Based on: King Solomon's Mines; 1885 novel by H. Rider Haggard
- Starring: Cedric Hardwicke; Anna Lee; Paul Robeson; Roland Young
- Cinematography: Glen MacWilliams
- Edited by: Michael Gordon
- Music by: Mischa Spoliansky
- Production company: Gaumont British Picture Corporation
- Distributed by: General Film Distributors
- Release dates: 17 June 1937 (UK); 26 July 1937 (US)
- Running time: 80 minutes
- Country: United Kingdom
- Language: English

King Solomon's Mines is a 1937 British adventure film directed by Robert Stevenson and starring Paul Robeson, Cedric Hardwicke, Anna Lee, John Loder and Roland Young. A film adaptation of the 1885 novel of the same name by Henry Rider Haggard, the film was produced by the Gaumont British Picture Corporation at Lime Grove Studios in Shepherd's Bush. Sets were designed by art director Alfred Junge. Of all the novel's adaptations, this film is considered to be the most faithful to the book.

== Plot ==
In 1881, Irish dream chaser Patrick "Patsy" O'Brien and his daughter Kathy have failed to strike it rich in the diamond mines of Kimberley, South Africa (then the Cape Colony). They persuade a reluctant Allan Quartermain to drive them to the coast in his wagon.

Along the way, they encounter another wagon carrying two men in bad shape. Umbopa recovers, but Silvestra Getto dies after boasting to Quartermain that he has found the way to the fabled mines of Solomon. Patsy finds the dead man's map and sneaks off during the night, unwilling to risk his daughter's life. Kathy is unable to persuade Quartermain to follow him; instead, they rendezvous with Quartermain's new clients, Sir Henry Curtis and retired naval commander John Good, who are hunting for big game.

Kathy steals Quartermain's wagon to pursue her father. When they catch up with her, she refuses to return with them, so they and Umbopa accompany her across the desert and over the mountains shown on the map. During the arduous trek, Curtis and Kathy fall in love. On the other side of the mountains, they are surrounded by unfriendly natives and taken to the kraal of their chief Twala to be questioned. Twala takes them to see the entrance of the mines that are guarded by the feared witch doctor Gagool.

That night, Umbopa reveals that he is the son of the former chief who was treacherously killed by the usurper Twala. He meets with dissidents, led by Infadoos, who are fed up with Twala's cruel reign. Together, they plot an uprising for the next day during the ceremony of the "smelling out of the evildoers." However, Umbopa needs Quartermain to devise a plan that the natives think will counter Gagool's magic.

During the rite, Gagool chooses several natives who are killed on the spot. Recalling having made a bet on the previous year's Derby Day, Good notices in his diary that there will be a total solar eclipse that day at exactly 11:15 a.m. The quick-thinking Quartermain predicts the eclipse as Gagool approaches Umbopa. Umbopa reveals his true identity to the people during the height of the eclipse and the rebellion erupts. Both sides gather their forces, and during the ensuing battle, Curtis kills Twala, ending the civil war.

In the fighting, Kathy slips away to the mine to look for her father. She finds him inside, immobilized by a broken leg but clutching a pouch full of diamonds. Quartermain, Curtis and Good follow her, but Gagool sets off a rockfall to seal them in. Inside they learn that the mine is connected to a volcano, the reason the mine was abandoned long ago. Umbopa pursues Gagool back into the mine, where the witch doctor is crushed by falling rocks. The new chief manages to free his friends as the volcano was about to erupt. He then gives them an escort to help them cross the desert.

== Cast ==
- Paul Robeson as Umbopa
- Cedric Hardwicke as Allan Quartermain
- Roland Young as Commander John Good
- John Loder as Sir Henry Curtis
- Anna Lee as Kathy O'Brien
- Arthur Sinclair as Patsy O'Brien
- Robert Adams as Twala
- Arthur Goullet as Sylvestra Getto
- Ecce Homo Toto as Infadoos
- Makubalo Hlubi as Kapse
- Mjujwa as Scragga
- Sydney Fairbrother as Gagool (uncredited)
- Frederick Leister as Diamond Buyer (uncredited)

== Production ==
Gaumont-British announced the film in 1935 and Paul Robeson was signed in 1936. Filming began in Shepherd's Bush, London in November 1936, and the unit then travelled to Africa for a further eight weeks of work. It was one of the series of films made by Gaumont set in the British Empire.

Charles Bennett is credited as one of the writers, but he claimed that he "didn't really" contribute to the screenplay. He said that he was opposed to the idea of a woman going along on the trip ("it was a damn silly idea") and took himself off the project.

== Reception ==
Frank S. Nugent of the The New York Times described the film as "a reliable thriller, guaranteed to delight the youngsters and reasonably certain of holding the attention of the rest of us" and he noted the "added charm of some authentic African scenery." In summing up, he wrote, "Call it an exciting make-believe, which doesn't have to be taken seriously to be enjoyed."

Variety also gave the film a positive review and described it as "a slab of genuine adventure decked in finely done, realistic African settings … and led off by grand acting from Cedric Hardwicke and Paul Robeson, whose rich voice is not neglected." Discussing the other performances, Variety wrote, "Roland Young puts in his lively vein of comedy to excellent effect. John Loder and Anna Lee are less effective on the romantic side."

Graham Greene gave the film a neutral review in Night and Day, summarizing it as "a 'seeable' picture." He praised the acting of Hardwicke and Young as well as the clever dovetailing of scenes filmed by Geoffrey Barkas. Greene disliked the performances by Loder and Robeson, and yearned for the first film adaptation, a 1919 silent film—now lost—directed by Horace Lisle Lucoque, which he felt was more faithful to Henry Rider Haggard's original 1885 book.

Modern Screen’s Leo Townsend found little to recommend the film other than the voice of Paul Robeson. He commented, "The rest of the cast is not at its best - for which the poor scenario is entirely to blame."

== See also ==
- List of films featuring eclipses
