= The Big Night (1960 film) =

1960 film

- Theatrical release poster
- Directed by: Sidney Salkow
- Screenplay by: Ric Hardman
- Produced by: Vern Alves; Philip May
- Starring: Randy Sparks; Venetia Stevenson; Dick Foran; Jesse White; Dick Contino; Frank Ferguson
- Cinematography: William P. Whitley
- Edited by: Dwight Caldwell
- Music by: Richard LaSalle
- Production company: Maycliff Productions
- Distributed by: Paramount Pictures
- Release date: February 17, 1960
- Running time: 74 minutes
- Country: United States
- Language: English

The Big Night is a 1960 American drama film directed by Sidney Salkow and written by Ric Hardman. The film stars Randy Sparks, Venetia Stevenson, Dick Foran, Jesse White, Dick Contino and Frank Ferguson. The film was released on February 17, 1960, by Paramount Pictures.

== Plot ==
Police kill two fleeing criminals while a third escapes. A briefcase tossed from their car's window into a canal is recovered by a young man, Frankie, who discovers that it contains $209,000 in cash from a bank robbery.

Frankie confides in his girlfriend Ellie, whose mother has expressed worry about her dating a young hoodlum. Ellie can't persuade Frankie to do the honest thing and return the money, which he hides. Carl Farrow, the remaining bank robber, begins trying to find out who has it, as does Wegg, a corrupt cop.

Following the boy, Wegg tries to cut himself in on a deal with Farrow, who instead slugs him and leaves him dead in the canal. Frightened after finding the body, Frankie turns himself in to the police. Farrow comes gunning for him but Frankie survives, then hopes for leniency from the law.

== Cast ==
- Randy Sparks as Frank
- Venetia Stevenson as Ellie
- Dick Foran as Ed
- Jesse White as Wegg
- Dick Contino as Carl Farrow
- Frank Ferguson as Dave
- Paul Langton as Spencer
- House Peters, Jr. as Robert Shaw
- Robert Paget as Tony
- Marc Cavell as Jerry
- Kay E. Kuter as The Mailman
- Anna Lee as Mrs. Turner

== Reception ==
In a brief contemporary review for The New York Times, critic Eugene Archer wrote that the film consists of "Randy Sparks as a juvenile delinquent who finds a briefcase containing $200,000 in stolen banknotes and wastes more than seventy minutes of screen and audience time before turning it over to the police. Venetia Stevenson, Dick Foran and Anna Lee are inconspicuous in the cast."
