= Venetia Stevenson =

British actress (1938–2022)

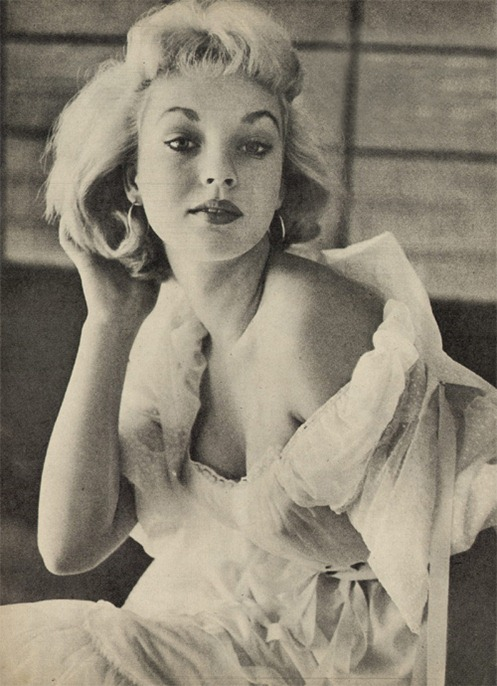
- Stevenson pictured in Silver Screen magazine, 1956
- Born: Joanna Venetia Invicta Stevenson; 10 March 1938; London, England
- Died: 26 September 2022 (aged 84); Atlanta, Georgia, U.S.
- Occupation: Actress
- Years active: 1957–2022
- Spouses: Russ Tamblyn (m. 1956; div. 1957) Don Everly (m. 1962; div. 1970)
- Children: 3, including Edan Everly
- Parents: Robert Stevenson (father); Anna Lee (mother)
- Relatives: Jeffrey Byron (half-brother)

Joanna Venetia Invicta Stevenson (10 March 1938 – 26 September 2022) was an English actress.

== Early life ==
Joanna Venetia Invicta Stevenson was born on 10 March 1938 in London, England, the daughter of film director Robert Stevenson and actress Anna Lee. The family moved to Hollywood within a year of her birth after her father signed a contract with film producer David O. Selznick. When her parents divorced in 1944, she stayed with her father and new stepmother, Frances. she received an education in exclusive California private schools.

== Acting career ==
Stevenson's theatrical debut was with her mother in Liliom, a play produced by the Sombrero Theater, in Phoenix, Arizona, in April 1955, featuring the husband-and-wife team of Fernando Lamas and Arlene Dahl.

A one-time Miss Los Angeles Press Club, Stevenson was placed on contract by RKO Pictures in November 1956. Hedda Hopper named Stevenson on her list of top movie newcomers in January 1957, alongside Jayne Mansfield. Hopper called Stevenson, then 18, "the most purely beautiful of all the new crop of stars."

On 13 March 1957, Stevenson was cast in CBS's Playhouse 90 adaptation of Charley's Aunt, with Tom Tryon, Jackie Coogan, and Jeanette MacDonald. On 12 November 1957, Stevenson appeared as Kathy Larsen in the episode "Trail's End" of the ABC/Warner Bros. Western series, Sugarfoot.

Stevenson's publicity machine continued to promote her. She was reported enjoying riding horses and playing table tennis. In November 1957, she won $300 in prizes at a horse show and participated at the National Horse Show at the Cow Palace in San Francisco. Around this time, she became the face on Sweetheart Stout cans and bottles; the brand marked the 50th anniversary of using her image in 2008.

Stevenson played Peggy McTavish in the film Darby's Rangers (1958), a Warner Bros. release in which she was paired with Peter Brown. She is one of the women pursued by actors cast as members of the American 1st Ranger Battalion during World War II. The movie was directed by William Wellman.

She appeared in the Western drama Day of the Outlaw (1959), starring Robert Ryan and Tina Louise. Stevenson also had a primary role in the film version of the Studs Lonigan trilogy by James T. Farrell, brought to the screen in December 1960.

Among the other motion pictures in which she appears are Island of Lost Women (1959), Jet Over the Atlantic (1959), The Big Night (1960), Seven Ways from Sundown (1960), The City of the Dead (or Horror Hotel, 1960), and The Sergeant Was a Lady (1961).

Stevenson appeared on television in episodes of Cheyenne (1957), Colt .45 (1958), 77 Sunset Strip (1958), The Adventures of Ozzie and Harriet (1958), Lawman (1958), The Millionaire (1959), The Third Man (1959), and Alfred Hitchcock Presents (1960) alongside Burt Reynolds and Harry Dean Stanton.

She appeared in Back to the Future Part II (1989) as the cover girl of the Oh Lala magazine.

== Personal life ==
=== Marriages and relationships ===
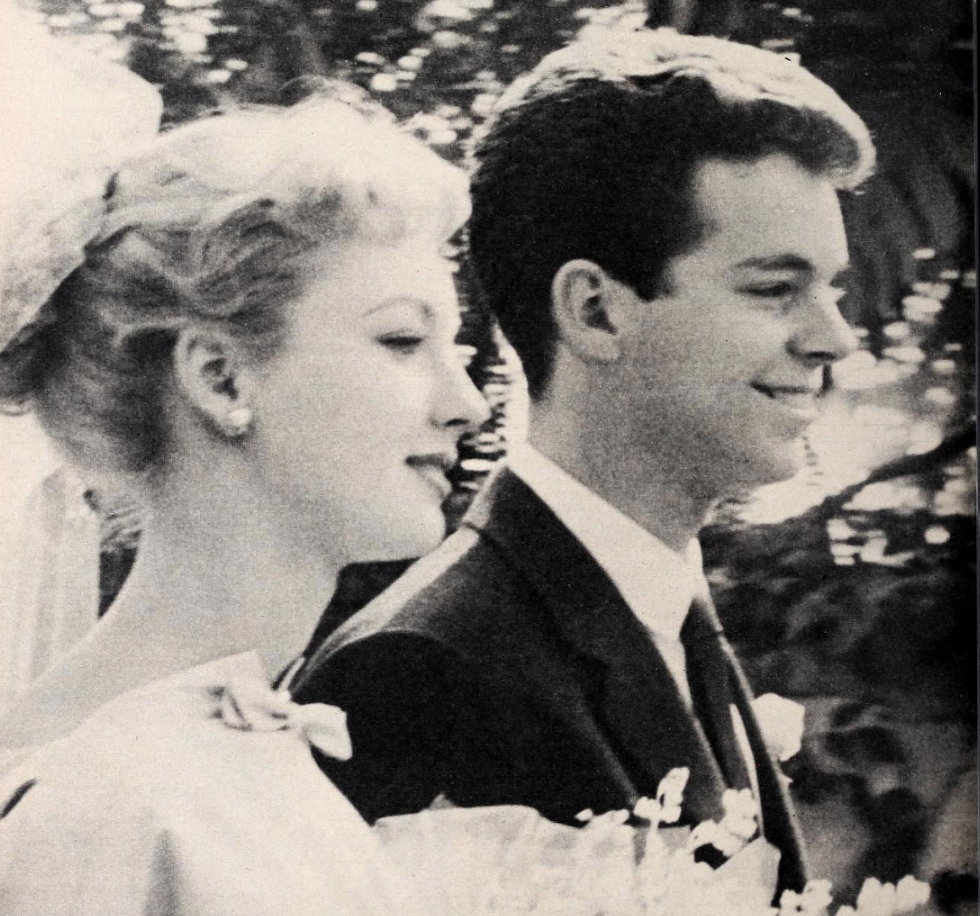
Stevenson with Russ Tamblyn on their wedding day, 1956

At the age of 17, Stevenson married MGM actor-dancer Russ Tamblyn on February 14, 1956, shortly after her half-brother, actor Jeffrey Byron, was born to her mother. the ceremony was at the Wayfarers Chapel in Palos Verdes. Stevenson and Tamblyn divorced in April 1957 but remained friends. A widely reproduced photograph shows Stevenson calmly walking down a Los Angeles street, seemingly unaware that Tamblyn is doing a spectacular backward aerial handspring a few inches away from her.

Stevenson had a year-long affair with actor Audie Murphy, which began when they co-starred in Seven Ways from Sundown in 1960.

In 1962, Stevenson married pop singer Don Everly and retired from acting and modeling. She had often said she hated acting. The couple had two daughters, Stacy and Erin Everly, both model/actresses, and a son, Edan Everly, a musician. They divorced in 1970 and Stevenson never remarried. Erin, the ex-wife of rocker Axl Rose, was the inspiration for several Guns N' Roses songs, including "Sweet Child o' Mine", where she also appeared in the video.

=== Friendships and publicity romances ===
Despite not having a starring role in a film before 1958, Stevenson was very popular in fan magazines. She was labeled "the most photogenic girl in the world" and went on rounds of dates, but most of the men she dated were only friends to her.

In his 2005 autobiography, Tab Hunter Confidential: the Making of a Movie Star, Tab Hunter, whom she frequently dated, admitted that she was a large part of his and his then-boyfriend Anthony Perkins's social life, "acting as a 'beard' when we double-dated." Although their relationship was an open secret in Hollywood, Stevenson was a confidante for Perkins during their romance. "[C]ertainly, we all knew Tony [Perkins] was gay", Stevenson told a Perkins biographer. "We were real friends, and he would sleep over at my house in the same bed. But there was never, ever any... well, you know. If you have a friend of the opposite sex who's gay, it's just up in the air."

=== Death ===
Stevenson died on 26 September 2022, from Parkinson's disease at the age of 84, at a health care facility in Atlanta, Georgia.

== Selected filmography ==
- Alfred Hitchcock Presents (1960) (Season 5 Episode 37: "Escape to Sonoita") as Stephanie Thomas
