= O.H.M.S. (film) =

1937 British adventure film by Raoul Walsh

- US theatrical poster
- Directed by: Raoul Walsh
- Screenplay by: Lesser Samuels; Ralph Bettinson
- Produced by: Geoffrey Barkas
- Starring: Wallace Ford; John Mills; Anna Lee
- Cinematography: Roy Kellino
- Edited by: Charles Saunders
- Music by: Jack Beaver; Louis Levy
- Production company: Gaumont-British Picture Corporation
- Distributed by: Gaumont British Distributors, England
- Release dates: January 1937 (London, England)
- Running time: 87 minutes
- Country: England
- Language: English

O.H.M.S. (US title You're in the Army Now) is a 1937 British adventure film directed by Raoul Walsh and starring Wallace Ford, John Mills, Anna Lee and Grace Bradley. The film score was composed by Jack Beaver.

== Plot ==
An American gangster evades the New York Police's pursuit of him for a murder he didn't commit by fleeing to England with the victim's papers, having assumed his identity. Once in England he joins the British Army and finds romance and adventure on campaign in China.

== Cast ==
- Wallace Ford as Jimmy Tracy
- John Mills as Corporal Bert Dawson
- Anna Lee as Sally Briggs
- Grace Bradley as Jean Burdett
- Frank Cellier as RSM Briggs
- Peter Croft as Student
- Frederick Leister as Vice-Consul
- Atholl Fleming as Military Instructor (uncredited)

== Production ==
Seeking to use cinema to counter the anti-militarist and pacifistic public atmosphere that predominated in the late 1930s in England, and foster an Anglo-American spirit on either side of the Atlantic Ocean in the prelude to the outbreak of World War II, the Gaumont British Picture Corporation engaged the American Director Raoul Walsh, and the Anglo-American star Wallace Ford to produce a film showing life in the British Army in an entertaining and positive light, in the same manner that Walsh had done for the United States Marines Corps in What Price Glory?.

The film was shot at Gainsborough Studios in London, and renamed You're in the Army Now! for its American release. The film's sets were designed by the art director Edward Carrick.

== Critical reception ==
Lionel Collier, for the British magazine, Picturegoer, described the film as "fine entertainment, combining comedy, drama, spectacle, and pageantry in well-mixed and well-presented proportions", and commented further that it "puts life in the army on the screen in a convincing manner without any excess of patriotism or flag-wagging." He wrote enthusiastically of the performers, stating that "the big hit of the picture is the performance of Wallace Ford … Anna Lee is particularly attractive, John Mills … is extremely good … Frank Cellier is excellently in character."

Variety also provided a very positive review, and wrote, "This picture is entitled to praise from many co-ordinated angles. It is as near 100% entertainment value as can reasonably be hoped for without the employment of a super-star, super-cast, super-production and super-director."
