= Dolly Shepherd =

Parachutist and fairground entertainer (1886–1983)

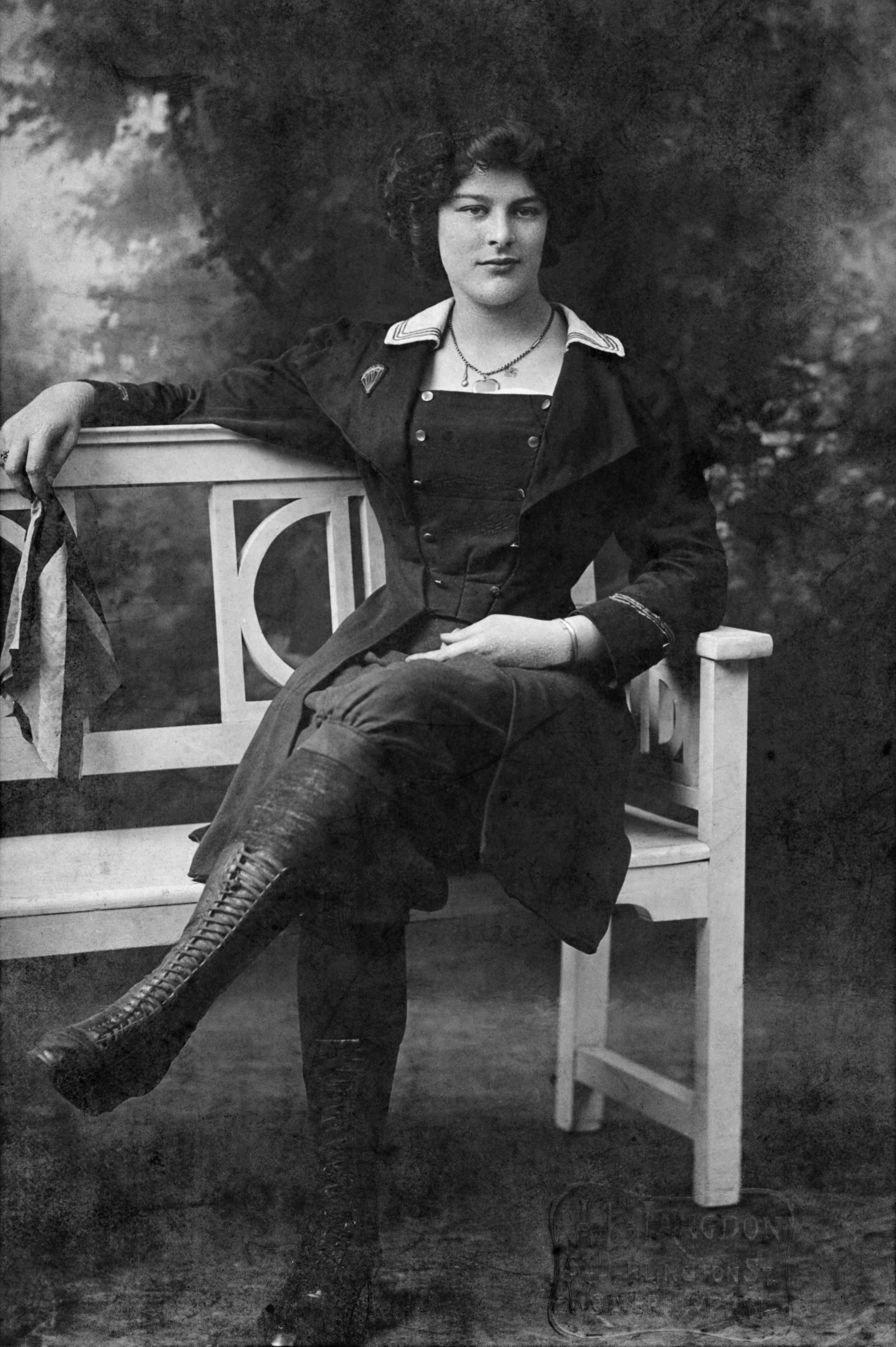
- 1911
- Born: 1886; Potters Bar, Middlesex, England
- Died: 1983 (aged 96–97)
- Other names: née Elizabeth Spencer, married name Elizabeth Sedgwick
- Occupations: parachutist, balloonist
- Known for: parachute jumping from balloon. flight with Red Devils aged c.90+

Elizabeth "Dolly" Shepherd (1886–1983) was a parachutist and fairground entertainer in the Edwardian era.

== Early life ==
Shepherd was born in Potters Bar, Middlesex, England.

== Career ==
At the age of 16, she got a job as a waitress at the Alexandra Palace in North London so that she could see the composer John Philip Sousa. She overheard two men discussing the loss of a target for an act in which they shot an apple off a girl's head; she volunteered on the spot. Shepherd took the place of Sam Cody's wife during his London show, wearing a blindfold, having Cody shoot, from her head, a plaster egg.

In 1905, she ascended on a trapeze slung below a hot-air balloon to a height of two to four-thousand feet before descending on a parachute. On one occasion, both the balloon and the parachute malfunctioned, and she found herself rising to 15,000 feet. At this height, both the cold and lack of oxygen were threatening to make her lose her grip and fall to her death. Fortunately, the balloon returned to earth before it was too late.

The mishap foreshadowed a later, more serious incident during an exhibition jump on 9 June 1908. Shepherd had ascended with another female parachutist, Louie May. During descent, May's parachute failed to release, leading Shepherd to implore May wrap her arms and legs around Shepherd so that they could descend on one parachute. Weighed down by May, Shepherd's descended too rapidly and was left paralyzed from the impact of her landing. She lay in bed, unable to move, for weeks. A doctor prescribed a course of electrical shock treatment. The doctor accidentally gave Dolly an excessively powerful electrical shock that resulted in her being ejected from the bed, but the powerful jolt realigned the vertebrae in Dolly's back and healed her. She then returned to her act and first flew again at Ashby-de-la-Zouch.

Edith Maud Cook died from injuries sustained following a jump from a balloon at Coventry on 9 July 1910 when her parachute collapsed after a gust of wind blew her on to a factory roof. Shepherd had been due to make the jump at Coventry but Cook had taken her place.

According to BBC History magazine, she liked to "go high because I had it in my head that if I had to be killed, I’d like to be killed completely: good and proper!" She recalled that on one occasion she almost landed on a steam train "That driver, he had some forethought: he blew the steam and just blew me off into a canal at Grantham."

In 1912, she thought she heard a voice telling her to "[not] go up again" and she never did.

During WWI, Dolly joined the Women's Volunteer Reserve, and she drove a munitions truck. At that time, she met Captain Percy Sedgwick, a man whom she chauffeured. Shepherd later married him, (married name Elizabeth Sedgwick).

In WWII, Dolly (Elizabeth Sedgwick), was an air raid shelter voluntary marshal, in a sandpit near Lewisham, southeast London, England.

She flew with the Red Devils display team to celebrate her 90th birthday.

== Personal life ==
Shepherd married Captain Percy Sedgwick. Her daughter is Molly Sedgwick.

== Legacy ==
There is a road named after Shepherd in the town where she flew again, Ashby-de-la-Zouch. "Dolly Shepherd Close" is off Philip Bent Road approximately 0.6 miles due West of the town centre.

== See also ==
- Rossa Matilda Richter

== Sources ==
- Shepherd, Dolly; Hearn, Peter; Sedgwick, Molly (1984). When the 'chute Went Up...: The Adventures of an Edwardian Lady Parachutist. London: Robert Hale. ISBN 978-0-7090-1551-2.
- Sally Lee. (2016) Hang On, Dolly! Pearson plc
- McCombie, Karen (March 2021). The Girl with Her Head in the Clouds: The Amazing Life of Dolly Shepherd. Edinburgh, Scotland: Barrington Stoke. ISBN 978-1-78112-945-6.
- women_history_trails - Haringey Council
- Cadogan, Mary (1993). Women with Wings: Female Flyers in Fact and Fiction. Academy Chicago. ISBN 978-0-89733-385-6.
- Lomax, Judy (1987). Women of the Air. Chivers. ISBN 978-0-7451-7072-5.
- Dolly Shepherd, early parachutist
- Sidney Smith Dolly Shepherd, taking off in her hot air balloon, at the Pickering Gala, on Wednesday 26 July 1911 Beck Isle Museum
- 'Dolly' Shepherd (1887-1983) Aviation Pioneers at Monash University
