= Non-Stop New York =

1937 film by Robert Stevenson

- Film poster
- Directed by: Robert Stevenson
- Written by: J.O.C. Orton; Roland Pertwee; Curt Siodmak; E.V.H. Emmett
- Based on: Sky Steward; 1936 novel by Ken Attiwill
- Starring: John Loder; Anna Lee; Francis L. Sullivan
- Cinematography: Mutz Greenbaum
- Edited by: Al Barnes
- Music by: Hubert Bath; Bretton Byrd; Louis Levy
- Production company: Gaumont British
- Distributed by: General Film Distributors
- Release dates: 13 September 1937 (UK); 28 November 1937 (US)
- Running time: 72 minutes
- Country: United Kingdom
- Language: English

Non-Stop New York (also known as Lisbon Clipper Mystery) is a 1937 British science fiction crime film directed by Robert Stevenson and starring John Loder, Anna Lee and Francis L. Sullivan. It was written by J.O.C. Orton, Roland Pertwee, Curt Siodmak and E.V.H. Emmett based on the 1936 novel Sky Steward by Ken Attiwill. A woman who can clear an innocent man of the charge of murder is pursued by gangsters onto a luxurious transatlantic flying boat.

== Plot ==
On New Year's Eve 1938 in New York, lawyer Billy Cooper notices stranded English showgirl Jennie Carr gazing hungrily at other diners' plates in a restaurant and offers to buy her a meal. However, the restaurant has run out, so he invites her to his apartment. Before they arrive, Abel, another hungry, unemployed person, sneaks in for a chicken leg. Hearing them coming, he hides in a bedroom. When Jennie enters to remove her coat, he begs her not to cause trouble. She sympathizes with his plight and says nothing to Cooper.

Just then, Hugo Brant, Cooper’s gangster employer, and his men barge in. They make Jennie leave. When Cooper admits that he is quitting, Brant shoots him dead. To get rid of loose ends, Brant sends Jennie aboard the ocean liner for Southampton, escorted by his sidekick Harrigan. He frames Jennie for robbery.

Meanwhile, Abel, who was caught by the building watchman as he tried to leave, is tried and sentenced to death for Cooper's murder. The woman he insists can exonerate him is in prison, unaware of his plight. Brant and gang member Mortimer travel to England to deal with Jennie.

When Jennie is released from her prison sentence for robbery, her mother introduces her to her new tenant, a priest named Mr. Mortimer. After reading in the newspaper about Abel's impending execution, she goes to Scotland Yard, despite Mortimer's warning that she might become a suspect. She finds that other women (Miss Harvey) have turned up, all claiming to be the missing witness. Inspector Jim Grant is skeptical, and that turns into certainty when Mortimer shows up and discredits her.

Meanwhile, Brant, under the alias of would-be Paraguayan dictator "General Costello", receives a message informing him of developments. The messenger, Spurgeon, later sneaks back and collects the torn-up pieces to sell to blackmailer Sam Pryor. Spurgeon also sells to Inspector Grant the information that Pryor will be flying to New York for blackmail.

With only days before Abel’s execution and insufficient money for airfare, Jennie stows away on the Atlantic Airlines "Lisbon Clipper", a giant transatlantic flying boat. Paying passengers include Brant, 14-year-old violin prodigy Arnold James and his aunt Veronica, Pryor and Inspector Grant. Jennie finds an empty compartment which turns out to be Grant's; while he is deciding what to do with her, the aircraft takes off. After she leaves, he informs a crewman he will pay her fare.

When Pryor tries to blackmail Costello, the latter bluffs him into leaving. Pryor then finds out that Jennie has some connection to the inspector; he poses as a police superintendent and learns from her her involvement in the murder. She remarks that a perpetrator could light a match singlehanded, something he saw Costello perform. He brings Jennie to Costello's dinner table, but Costello appears unfazed.

Late that night, by chance, Jennie and Costello are alone in the lounge. He lures the unsuspecting young woman on the open-air balcony, intending to push her over, but Pryor is watching. Now in a stronger bargaining position, he demands not £1,000 but £20,000, this time for not interfering with Costello's plan. Costello seemingly agrees and leads him into the baggage compartment for the money, but instead shoots him dead. There is an unseen witness, however: Arnold. He wakes Grant. Meanwhile, Costello tries to strangle Jennie. When Grant hears her screams, he bursts in, only to be held at gunpoint. Distracted by Arnold, Costello grabs Aunt Veronica's parachute, makes his way to the cockpit, locks the door, shoots the pilot and jumps out. With the aircraft out of control, Grant goes outside, makes his way over the fuselage, clinging to a cable handrail, to the cockpit, and unlocks the door for the other pilot, who regains control just in time. When Grant radios for a police cordon for Costello, Arnold sheepishly admits he used part of the parachute to muffle his saxophone.

== Cast ==
Main roles and screen credits identified:

- John Loder as Inspector Jim Grant
- Anna Lee as Jennie Carr
- Francis L. Sullivan as Hugo Brant, aka "General Costello"
- Frank Cellier as Sam Pryor, a bookmaker
- Desmond Tester as Arnold James, violin child prodigy
- Athene Seyler as Aunt Veronica
- William Dewhurst as Mortimer
- Drusilla Wills as Mrs. Carr, Jennie's mother
- Jerry Verno as Steward
- James Pirrie as Billy Cooper
- Ellen Pollock as Miss Harvey
- Arthur Goullett as Abel
- Peter Bull as Spurgeon
- Tony Quinn as Harrigan
- H. G. Stoker as Captain

The "Lisbon Clipper" was recreated in full-scale models as well as a scaled down version used in back screen process work.

== Production ==
Largely filmed at Gaumont Graphic studios in Shepherd's Bush, the production relied on a huge flying boat prop, that was realistically created and used for both exterior and interior shots. Recognizing the talent of "specialists at 'make believe'," the film employed the skills of the studio workmen to also build a realistic scale model.

== Reception ==
=== Box office ===
Kinematograph Weekly reported the film as a "surprise" "turn up" at the British box office in March 1938.

=== Critical ===
The Monthly Film Bulletin wrote: "Here is an exciting story, well told, and, with one exception, well acted. Robert Stvenson has directed with imagination and tremendous pace, the dialogue is extremely good and the result is an outstanding film of its kind. As the boy violinist Desmond Tester steals the picture with a delightful comedy performance, while Francis L. Sullivan is Laughton-sinister as Brandt, and Frank Cellier is an excellent Sam Pryor. The weakness of the film is Anna Lee (Jennie) whose acting is poor. Settings and photography are good, particularly in the air liner."

Variety wrote: "Even allowing for the futuristic element, it is all a bit improbable, but it is well done, exciting, and splendily acted. ... Francis L. Sullivan makes an oily, nauseating villain; Frank Cellier is a convincing blackmailer; John Loder and Anna Lee are a passable pair of lovers, and Desmond Tester as an infant violin prodigy gets the most out of his part as a curious, meddlesome boy whose one ambition is to desert the catgut for the saxophone. Good photography and convincing direction make the most of the material."

The New York Times review called it a "well-staged and moderately entertaining Class B melodrama" featuring "a transatlantic airplane as richly imaginative as a front-cover of Popular Science or a Buck Rogers space ship".

A more recent review by Leonard Maltin noted the film was a "... Fast-paced, tongue-in-cheek Hitchcock-like yarn ..."
