= Edith Maud Cook =

British parachutist, balloonist, and aviator (1878–1910)

- Born: 1 September 1878; Ipswich, Suffolk
- Died: 14 July 1910 (aged 31); Coventry
- Occupations: Parachutist, balloonist, and aviator
- Era: Edwardian - 1900s
- Known for: Over 300 parachute jumps. First British woman to pilot a plane.

Edith Maud Cook (1 September 1878 – 14 July 1910), was an early British parachutist, balloonist, and aviator, recognized as Britain's first female pilot. She was also known as Viola Spencer-Kavanagh, Viola Spencer, Viola Kavanagh, and perhaps as Viola Fleet and Elsa Spencer.

== Biography ==
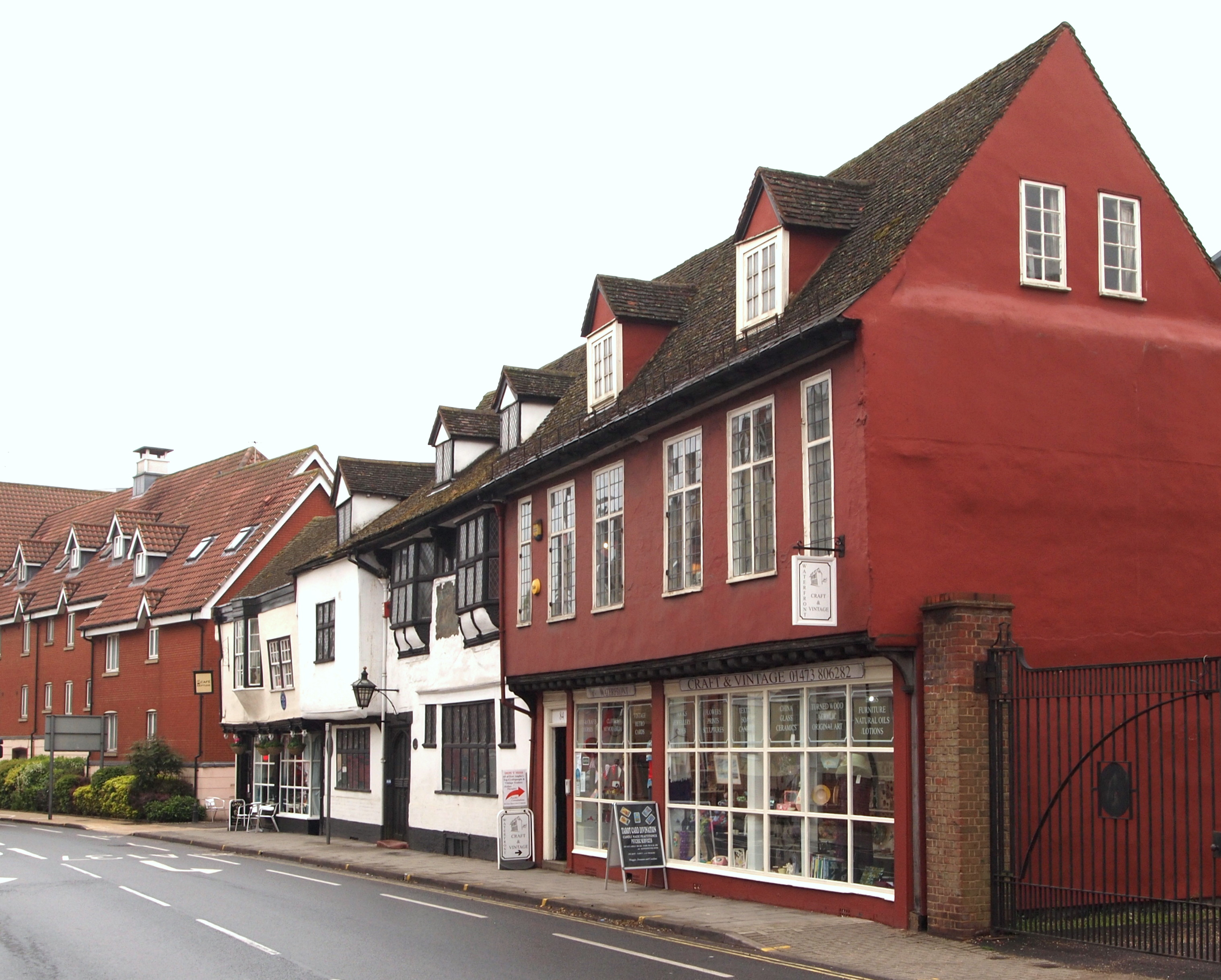
No 90, Fore St, Ipswich, birthplace of Edith Maud Cook. Now the Neptune Café.

Cook was born on 1 September 1878, in Ipswich, Suffolk, the daughter of James Wells Cook, a confectioner, and Mary Ann Baker. Her birthplace is marked by a plaque erected by the Ipswich Society in 2007.

Edith was variously known as Miss Spencer-Kavanagh, Viola Spencer-Kavanagh, Viola Spencer, and Viola Kavanagh. She is also reputed to have been known as Viola Fleet and Elsa Spencer, although another lady parachutist was using the latter name in 1919. It would seem that she used the names Viola Spencer and Viola Kavanagh when undertaking parachuting engagements, and the name Spencer-Kavanagh as an aviator. She worked for the Spencer Brothers and Auguste Eugene Gaudron.

In August 1908, she had a narrow escape when trying to make a parachute jump at Ilkeston, Derbyshire. On attaining the desired altitude she found that she could not detach the parachute from the balloon. Clinging on she continued to gain height and drifted during the night before she finally came down some twenty-five miles from her starting point. This event was widely reported in newspapers at the time.

She was reputed to have made over 300 parachute jumps in a career spanning over 10 years. She was reported in the newspapers to carry a small revolver with her as she could never be sure where she might land.

Edith was a pupil at the Blériot flying school and at Claude Grahame-White's school at Pau, Pyrénées-Atlantiques in 1909 or early 1910, where she learnt to fly; and, according to the journals of the day, became the first British woman to pilot a plane.

- Contemporary artists impression (1910)

She died from injuries sustained following a jump from a balloon at Coventry on 9 July 1910. Her parachute collapsed after a gust of wind blew her on to a factory roof. It was reported that another gust of wind caught the parachute and she fell from the factory roof sustaining serious injuries. She died on the 14th, and an inquest was held on the 16th; her death certificate states the cause of her death as "Internal injuries, broken pelvis and arm, caused by a fall from a parachute. Accidental." Apparently Dolly Shepherd had been due to make the jump at Coventry but Cook took her place.

In 2008 Suffolk Aviation Heritage Group launched a campaign to erect a statue to Edith Cook in her home town of Ipswich in Suffolk, but as of 2016 no statue had been approved.

In 2013, a new road was named in her honour on the former Ipswich Airport site, providing access to the employment use portions of Ravenswood.

== See also ==
- Rossa Matilda Richter
