= The Omega Connection =

- European video cover
- Genre: Action; Drama
- Screenplay by: Gail Morgan Hickman; David E. Boston
- Story by: Gail Morgan Hickman; David E. Boston; David Assael; Joshua Brand; Martha Coolidge
- Directed by: Robert Clouse
- Starring: Jeffrey Byron; Larry Cedar
- Music by: John Cameron
- Country of origin: United States
- Original language: English

Production
- Executive producer: Ron Miller
- Producer: Jan Williams
- Cinematography: Godfrey A. Godar
- Editors: Peter Boita; Mike Campbell
- Running time: 100 minutes
- Production company: Walt Disney Productions

Original release
- Network: NBC
- Release: March 18, 1979

The Omega Connection is a 1979 American made-for-television action spy film directed by Robert Clouse for Walt Disney Productions. It stars Jeffrey Byron and Larry Cedar. It was released theatrically in other countries as The London Connection.

== Plot ==
Luther Starling is a superspy for the American government who after completing his latest mission of retrieving stolen documents sets out on a six week vacation across Europe. Luther is picked up at Heathrow airport in London, England by his friend Roger in his Morgan 3-Wheeler to stay with Roger and Roger's Aunt Lydia for the duration of the London leg of Luther's trip. By chance the two follow a motorcade where British Secret Service agents Bidley and Peters are escorting a recently defected Eastern European scientist, Professor Buchinski who possesses a revolutionary new energy formula. However, when a team of armed gunmen ambush the motorcade intent on kidnapping the Professor, Luther attempts to intervene but is outmatched but the professor slips a gold ring into his jacket pocket. Upon discovery of the ring, it leads Luther and Roger on an adventure across London as they attempt to rescue the professor from the villainous criminal organization Omega.

== Cast ==
- Jeffrey Byron as Luther Starling
- Larry Cedar as Roger Pike
- Roy Kinnear as Bidley
- Lee Montague as Vorg
- Mona Washbourne as Aunt Lydia
- David Kossoff as Professor Buchinski
- Frank Windsor as McGuffin
- Walter Gotell as Simmons
- Nigel Davenport as Arthur Minton
- Dudley Sutton as Goetz
- David Battley as Peters
- Julian Orchard as Driscoll
- Kathleen Harrison as elderly lady
- Percy Herbert as ship's captain
- Don Fellows as General
- Bruce Boa as Colonel
- Wolfe Morris as Dr. Krause
- André Maranne as Duvalier
- George Pravda as Kolenkov
- Rita Webb as cockney woman
- Minah Bird as narcotics agent

== Production ==
Disney developed The Omega Connection with the hope of positioning it as a more youthful take on the James Bond franchise and intended to produce follow-on films centered around the character of Luther Starling.

The film was shot on location at Pinewood Studios in London. Gloucester Mews, W2, was used as a filming location during the shooting of The London Connection.

== Release ==
The Omega Connection was broadcast on television in the United States on March 18, 1979 as part of The Wonderful World of Disney. The film was released theatrically in some foreign markets such as Japan and the United Kingdom under the alternate title of The London Connection. Due to Disney's desire to cater to a more mature audience than usual, the film was broadcast in the 8PM time slot instead of its usual 7PM time slot. The change in time slot lead to the film directly competing with critical and ratings hit The Jericho Mile on ABC and under performed as a result with planned follow-up films such as The Paris Connection and The Rome Connection being quietly cancelled.

In rebroadcasts of the film in later seasons, the film would be divided into one hour segments to be shown over two weeks worth of broadcasts.
