= Young Man's Fancy (film) =

1939 film by Robert Stevenson

- Directed by: Robert Stevenson
- Written by: Rodney Ackland; E.V.H. Emmett; Roland Pertwee; Robert Stevenson
- Produced by: S.C. Balcon
- Starring: Anna Lee; Griffith Jones; Seymour Hicks; Martita Hunt
- Cinematography: Ronald Neame
- Edited by: Ralph Kemplen; Charles Saunders
- Music by: Ernest Irving
- Production company: Ealing Studios
- Distributed by: ABFD
- Release date: 1 August 1939
- Running time: 77 minutes
- Country: United Kingdom
- Language: English

Young Man's Fancy is a 1939 British historical comedy film directed by Robert Stevenson and starring Anna Lee, Griffith Jones, and Seymour Hicks. The screenplay concerns an aristocratic Englishman who is unhappily engaged to a brewery heiress but meets Ada, an Irish human cannonball, during a visit to a music hall and falls in love with her. Together they are trapped in Paris during the Siege of Paris (1870-1871).

The screenplay was written by Roland Pertwee and Stevenson, with additional dialogue by Rodney Ackland and E.V.H. Emmett. The character of Ada, written especially for Anna Lee by Stevenson, her husband, is "based on Zazel, the original 'human cannon ball', who thrilled London audiences in the [eighteen] nineties by being shot from a cannon" — however, "for the purposes of the film … the period [of the screenplay] has been put back to the seventies".

== Cast ==
- Griffith Jones as Lord Alban
- Anna Lee as Ada
- Seymour Hicks as Duke of Beaumont
- Billy Bennett as Capt. Boumphray
- Edward Rigby as Gray
- Francis L. Sullivan as Blackbeard
- Martita Hunt as Duchess of Beaumont
- Meriel Forbes as Miss Crowther
- Felix Aylmer as Sir Caleb Crowther
- Raymond Aimos as Tramp
- Phyllis Monkman as Esme
- Morton Selten as Fothergill
- George Carney as Chairman
- Allan Aynesworth as Mr. Trubshaw
- Athene Seyler as Milliner
- George Benson as Booking Clerk
- Irene Eisinger as Singer at the Hôtel de L'Univers

== See also ==
- Rossa Matilda Richter
