= Forever and a Day (1943 film) =

1943 drama film

- Original film poster
- Directed by: 7 directors
- Written by: multiple writers
- Produced by: 7 producers
- Starring: Kent Smith; Ruth Warrick
- Cinematography: Robert De Grasse; Lee Garmes; Russell Metty; Nicholas Musuraca
- Edited by: George Crone; Elmo Williams
- Music by: Anthony Collins
- Distributed by: RKO Radio Pictures
- Release date: March 26, 1943
- Running time: 104 minutes
- Country: United States
- Language: English

Forever and a Day is a 1943 American drama film, a collaborative effort employing seven directors/producers and 22 writers, with a large ensemble cast of well-known stars.

== Plot ==
In World War II, American Gates Trimble Pomfret is in London during the Blitz to sell the ancestral family house. The current tenant, Lesley Trimble, tries to dissuade him from selling by telling him the 140-year history of the place and the connections between the Trimble and Pomfret families.

== Cast ==
- Kent Smith as Gates Trimble Pomfret
- Reginald Gardiner as Assistant Hotel Manager
- Victor McLaglen as Archibald Spavin, hotel doorman
- Arthur Treacher as Second Air Raid Watcher
- June Lockhart as Girl in Air Raid Shelter
- Ruth Warrick as Lesley Trimble
- Sir Cedric Hardwicke as Mr. Dabb
- Herbert Marshall as Curate in Air Raid Shelter
- C. Aubrey Smith as Admiral Eustace Trimble
- Edmund Gwenn as Stubbs
- Lumsden Hare as Fitch
- Ray Milland as Lieutenant William Trimble
- Dame May Whitty as Mrs. Lucy Trimble
- Gene Lockhart as Cobblewick
- Anna Neagle as Susan Trenchard
- Claud Allister as William Barstow
- Claude Rains as Ambrose Pomfret
- Clifford Severn as Nelson Trimble
- Alec Craig as Ambrose Pomfret's Butler
- Jessie Matthews as Mildred Trimble
- Reginald Owen as Simpson, solicitor
- Ian Hunter as Dexter Pomfret
- Charles Laughton as Bellamy, Dexter's butler
- Anna Lee as Cornelia Trimble
- Buster Keaton as Wilkins, plumber's helper
- Montagu Love as Sir John Bunn
- Edward Everett Horton as Sir Anthony Trimble-Pomfret
- Patric Knowles as Trimble-Pomfret son
- June Duprez as Julia Trimble-Pomfret
- Cecil Kellaway as Dinner Guest
- Isobel Elsom as Lady Trimble-Pomfret
- Ida Lupino as Jenny Jones, the maid
- Wendy Barrie as Edith Trimble-Pomfret
- Eric Blore as Charles, the butler
- Brian Aherne as Jim Trimble
- Merle Oberon as Marjorie Ismay
- Emily Fitzroy as Mrs. Fulcher
- Una O'Connor as Mrs. Caroline Ismay
- Richard Haydn as Mr. Butcher
- Odette Myrtil as Madame Gaby
- Nigel Bruce as Major Garrow
- Elsa Lanchester as Mamie, the hotel maid
- Ivan F. Simpson as Dexter, the hotel tenant
- Anita Sharp-Bolster as Mrs. Garrow
- Roland Young as Henry Barringer
- Gladys Cooper as Mrs. Barringer
- Robert Cummings as Ned Trimble
- Donald Crisp as Captain Martin
- Doris Lloyd as Trimble Maid
- Helena Pickard as Trimble Maid
- Connie Leon as wartime Londoner

== Background ==
In March 1940, Cedric Hardwicke initiated plans for a movie made without remuneration by British writers, directors and actors/actresses, intended to honor their homeland's spirit and to benefit war relief charities, with RKO Studios financing the production costs of the film with a $300,000 budget: it was estimated that had the film's pro bono participants been salaried the film would have cost $6 million (the actors and actresses appearing in the film were reportedly paid $60 a week as mandated by Equity; their pay may have been routinely donated).

The film – whose first working title was Let The Rafters Ring, with This Changing Time and Forever and a Day both later put forward as possibilities – had its original projected completion date of 1 June 1941 negated by the screenplay not being completed until April 1941. W. P. Lipscomb – who was paid $10,000 – wrote this screenplay, reportedly drawing on the brainstorming sessions of a committee of writers musing on a scenario proposed by Robert Stevenson. This scenario, attributed by Stevenson to an unpublished novel he had written, overtly reprised the scenario of Cavalcade (1933), the first British film to emphatically find favor with the American film industry and moviegoers, which had outlined the personal history of the families resident in a London townhouse within the context of the historical events of 1899 to 1929. To accommodate a large cast of British-born stars Forever and a Day had an extended timespan of 136 years (1804-1940), and was filmed – with minimal advance publicity – from May to December 1941.

The film's first episode – directed by Herbert Wilcox and starring his wife Anna Neagle, as well as Ray Milland and Claude Rains, was filmed in two weeks in May 1941, with Neagle and Rains reprising their roles in the second episode completed – under Robert Stevenson's direction – in June. The film was then dormant for several months due to scheduling issues with its projected stars: Ronald Colman and Greer Garson had offered to appear in the film, but they were disallowed by MGM from playing the focal couple of the third episode, that studio feeling it would lessen the impact of the upcoming Colman/Garson star vehicle Random Harvest. The episode's director, Victor Saville, extended an invitation to British stage musical star Jessie Matthews, then in New York City preparing for a Broadway role, to replace Garson (Saville had helmed the most successful films made by Matthews in her homeland in the 1930s): Matthews agreed to film Garson's intended scenes over three days in Hollywood in September 1941, playing opposite Ian Hunter, whose services MGM had donated to cover for Colman (Hunter had been Matthews' leading man in one of her lesser films: The Man from Toronto (1933)).

The fourth episode was set to film in the autumn of 1941 after Cary Grant and Alfred Hitchcock – the leading man and director – had completed the film Suspicion: the availability of the episode's leading lady: Ida Lupino, was a non-issue, the actress being on suspension at Warner Bros. When the filming of Suspicion ran overtime, preventing both Grant and Hitchcock from filming the fourth episode in September 1941, Brian Aherne replaced Grant as Lupino's leading man, with René Clair replacing Hitchcock as director. Filming on the fifth episode – with Edmund Goulding directing leading players Robert Cummings and Merle Oberon – began on 27 November 1941, with the film as originally envisioned completed after the filming day of 1 December 1941: however, the 7 December 1941 attack on Pearl Harbor infused in Hardwicke the need to modify the film to reflect the direct involvement in World War II which Pearl Harbor made inevitable. When the film remained incomplete several months into 1942, RKO – who by then had spent $100,000 over the agreed $300,000 production costs budget – insisted the film be "wrapped" and made ready for release, assigning Frank Lloyd to direct Kent Smith and Ruth Warrick – both RKO contract players – in a "framing" segment set in 1941 which would open and close the film, also popping up between the second and third episode. It was hoped that Forever and a Day could be released in November 1942: however, the film would not be released until March 1943.

Clair later said, "Forever and a Day I totally disown", and he became involved after Hitchcock dropped out. He added, "Since the British considered I was almost one of them after having made two pictures in England, they asked me to direct that short sketch and so I agreed. But the script had already been completed, and I only partially revised it. The way it had been written, the sketch would have lasted half an hour and would have cost a fortune to shoot. All I really did was trim it down into reasonable proportions and make it viable... It's the only film I've ever directed for which I didn't write the script. Completely uninteresting."
