= The Lion Has Wings =

1939 British propaganda film

- US theatrical release poster
- Directed by: Michael Powell; Brian Desmond Hurst; Adrian Brunel; Alexander Korda (uncredited)
- Written by: Adrian Brunel; E. V. H. Emmett
- Story by: Ian Dalrymple
- Produced by: Alexander Korda; Ian Dalrymple
- Starring: Merle Oberon; Ralph Richardson; June Duprez
- Narrated by: E. V. H. Emmett (UK); Lowell Thomas (US)
- Cinematography: Osmond Borradaile; Bernard Browne; Harry Stradling Sr.
- Edited by: Henry Cornelius; Charles Frend; Hugh Stewart; Derek N. Twist
- Music by: Richard Addinsell
- Production company: London Films
- Distributed by: United Artists
- Release date: 3 November 1939 (UK)
- Running time: 76 minutes
- Country: United Kingdom
- Language: English
- Budget: £31,500 ($764K in 2021) or $150,000

The Lion Has Wings is a 1939 British, black-and-white, documentary-style, propaganda war film that was directed by Adrian Brunel, Brian Desmond Hurst, Alexander Korda and Michael Powell. The film was produced by London Film Productions and Alexander Korda Film Productions and 'was preparing the nation [for war] and shining a light on the power of the RAF'.

The Lion Has Wings was made at the outbreak of World War II and was released to cinemas very quickly. It helped convince the British government of film's value for disseminating both propaganda and information.

== Plot ==
The Lion Has Wings is recounted in various 'chapters' with a linking story revolving around a senior Royal Air Force (RAF) officer, played by Ralph Richardson, his wife and his family.

A RAF Vickers Wellington bomber sets off on an attack on the Kiel shipyards in Germany, a pivotal event in the film

The film opens with a newsreel-style documentary comparing life in Britain to life in Nazi Germany, narrated by E.V.H. Emmett in the upbeat and patriotic narrative style common to such newsreels in Britain. This mainly uses existing newsreel footage with some additional footage shot especially for the film. It includes scenes from Fire Over England with Queen Elizabeth I giving her speech to the troops at Tilbury about repelling invaders. It also compares the relaxed lifestyles and openness of the British royal family and the British people with the militarism of Nazi Germany by including footage from the Nazi propaganda documentary Triumph of the Will (Triumph des Willens).

The second chapter shows an early bombing raid on German warships in the Kiel Canal. Although it was mainly recreated in the studio, and with special effects, it also includes some footage of the real bombers and their crews returning from the raid.

The third chapter shows an attack by Luftwaffe bombers, and how it is repelled by the RAF, with assistance from the Observer Corps and barrage balloons.

The epilogue has Mr and Mrs Richardson taking a break from their duties, enjoying an afternoon by the river. She gives a stirring speech about how the women of Britain have in the past given their sons and lovers to the land and to the sea, and must now give them to the air. They will do so willingly to defend all that is fair and kind about the British way of life. But Wing Commander Richardson is so tired he falls asleep part way through her speech.

== Cast ==
- Merle Oberon as Mrs Richardson
- Ralph Richardson as Wing Commander Richardson
- June Duprez as June
- Flora Robson as Queen Elizabeth I (Footage taken from Fire Over England)
- Robert Douglas as Briefing officer
- Anthony Bushell as Pilot
- Brian Worth as Bobby
- Austin Trevor as Schulemburg
- Ivan Brandt as officer
- G. H. Mulcaster as Controller
- Herbert Lomas as Holveg
- Milton Rosmer as Head of Observer Corps
- Ronald Adam as Bomber Chief
- Robert Rendel as Chief of Air Staff
- Archibald Batty as Air Officer
- Ian Fleming as Air Officer
- Derrick De Marney as Bill
- Bernard Miles as Observer Controller
- E. V. H. Emmett as Narrator, UK (voice)
- Lowell Thomas as Narrator, US (voice)

== Production ==
At the outbreak of war, there were fears that all film production would be halted and cinemas closed, as they were during World War I. Alexander Korda was close friends with Winston Churchill, and was very aware of current events. As soon as war was declared, Korda pulled staff from other productions to fulfill his promise to Churchill that he would have a feature propaganda film ready within one month of the outbreak of war.

Since The Lion Has Wings was made before the attacks on Britain had begun, the film had to rely on existing stock footage, including sequences lifted from the air raid featurette, The Gap. Contemporary aircraft, many of which were obsolete by 1939, are a noticeable jarring element. The footage of a German bomber taking off is actually a German airliner (Focke-Wulf Fw 200); at least, it has the correct markings, but most of the biplane aircraft featured in the RAF air show were obsolete fighters. The addition of footage that was shot at operational bases, RAF Hornchurch, Hornchurch, Essex, and RAF Mildenhall, Suffolk, England, combined with studio work at Denham Studio, Denham, Buckinghamshire, UK, lent an air of authenticity to the production.

To ensure rapid progress, the film had three directors, and was shot simultaneously in various locations. Michael Powell was assigned the task of recreating the RAF bomber raids, and his taut and well-structured section stands up the best, while Brian Desmond Hurst's sequences include Merle Oberon and Ralph Richardson which brought 'the undoubted stardust he managed to sprinkle with the help of his leading actors' which helped fill the cinemas. Adrian Brunel, the last of the three credited directors, was responsible for the spy and 'crisis' scenes. Powell later remarked that the project was 'all shop-made, edited, and directed in less than a month'.

== Reception ==
The speed of production and the multiple directors shows in the final result, but it is an effective 'message' film. It was all shot in 12 days, and completed in about four weeks, at a cost of just £30,000, a notable achievement in those times. Within days of its release, copies had been shipped to 60 countries. Although it is difficult to determine its actual impact on the public, The Lion Has Wings was considered a significant factor in persuading the British government to allow the film industry to continue to work, and the film was regarded as a model of how filmmakers could be an asset to the war effort.

Like many propaganda films, The Lion Has Wings does not tell the whole truth, but there are many elements of truth in it. The use of radar as a defensive measure was not mentioned, since it was still a secret. However, the bombing raids were shown first being reported by spies then confirmed by the Observer Corps, a tactic that was actually occurring as part of Britain's defensive measures. The film also shows Luftwaffe bombers trying to attack London, but being completely turned back by barrage balloons, which in reality had little effect on the raids. The use of RAF fighters intercepting and attacking enemy bombers at night was not feasible at that point. These errors or misinterpretations added to other lofty claims that Britain had sufficient aircraft in production and was quite ready to fight to counter the overwhelming numbers of Luftwaffe raiders; all purposeful exaggerations were intended to bolster morale.

Public reaction was generally reserved, as British audiences saw The Lion Has Wings as patently simplistic and patronising; yet, it was a commercial success. Powell later derided the project as 'an outrageous piece of propaganda, full of half-truths and half-lies, with some stagey episodes which were rather embarrassing and with actual facts which were highly distorted...'

William Shirer, author of The Rise and Fall of the Third Reich, recounts in his Berlin Diary on 10 June 1940 that he thought the film 'very bad, supercilious, and silly'. He was shown the film at the German Propaganda ministry while working as a CBS Radio news reporter.

=== Box office ===
The film was successful commercially. In 1944 the Ministry of Information, entitled to half producers' profits, announced it had earned £25,140 from the film.

== Home video ==
This film is available on DVD from:

- DD Home Entertainment coded for Region 2 (UK & Europe)
- Magna Pacific coded for Region 4 (Australasia)
- Criterion as an extra included on their release of The Thief of Bagdad coded for Region 1.

== Books ==
Theirs is the Glory: Arnhem, Hurst and Conflict on Film takes Hurst's Battle of Arnhem epic as its centrepiece and then chronicles Hurst's life and experiences during the First World War and profiles each of his other nine films on conflict, including The Lion Has Wings.
