= Jet Over the Atlantic =

1959 film by Byron Haskin

- Theatrical poster
- Directed by: Byron Haskin
- Written by: Irving H. Cooper
- Produced by: Benedict Bogeaus
- Starring: Guy Madison; Virginia Mayo; George Raft; Ilona Massey
- Cinematography: George Stahl
- Edited by: Thomas Pratt
- Music by: Louis Forbes
- Production companies: Inter-Continent Films, Inc.
- Distributed by: Inter Continent Releasing Organization
- Release date: November 4, 1959
- Running time: 95 minutes (Note: The film is also listed as 91 or 92 minutes.)
- Countries: United States; Mexico
- Language: English

Jet Over the Atlantic (also known as High Over the Atlantic) is a 1959 drama film directed by Byron Haskin and stars Guy Madison, Virginia Mayo, George Raft and Ilona Massey. The film's title was misleading as the airliner was a Bristol Britannia turboprop-engined, not "pure" jet-powered aircraft. (Note: An airport announcement in the film refers to the aircraft being a "prop-jet".) George Raft's biographer Everett Aaker called Jet Over the Atlantic "a precursor of the disaster genre."

== Plot ==
Wanted on a charge of murder, Brett Matton, a Korean War U.S. Air Force veteran, has fled the country to Spain, where he has been living for two years and is engaged to wed Jean Gurney, a former showgirl. FBI Agent Stafford arrives in Spain to arrest Brett and extradite him to the United States.

On their commercial flight to New York, the passengers include Jean, who bought a ticket at the last minute, and Lord Leverett, a man deranged by his daughter's death. Leverett brings aboard a chemical poison hidden in his bag.

The handcuffed Brett is given a few minutes by Stafford to explain to Jean about his past life. His story is that two men killed a bartender, knocked him out and placed the gun in his hand. Certain he would never get a fair trial, Brett ran away. A minister on board marries Brett to Jean with the agent's permission. Brett steals a pistol from a partner of Stafford's who is asleep. He tells Jean, to avoid going to jail, he intends to hijack the airliner to Canada, landing in Montreal, at an airport he knows.

The poison leaks from Leverett's case, emitting toxic fumes, and causing a fire in the cabin, killing the pilots and navigator. Former combat pilot Brett is asked to fly the aircraft. He must make an emergency landing on water and without a radio, which Leverett has damaged. Brett ends up shooting Leverett, although a grateful Stafford still insists on being given the gun.

Brett takes pity on the dying passengers and lands the jet. Authorities on the ground inform Stafford that another man is being charged with the bar murder and Brett will be cleared.

== Cast ==
- Guy Madison as Brett Matton, aka Brett Murphy (Note: In reviews, the character's name was also written as "Matoon" or "Mattoon".)
- Virginia Mayo as Jean Gurney
- George Raft as Stafford
- Ilona Massey as Mme. Galli-Cazetti
- George Macready as Lord Robert Leverett
- Anna Lee as Ursula Leverett
- Margaret Lindsay as Mrs. Lanyard
- Venetia Stevenson as June Elliott
- Mary Anderson as Maria
- Brett Halsey as Dr. Vanderbird
- Argentina Brunetti as Miss Hooten
- Frederic Worlock as Rev. Dean Halltree

== Production ==
A Bristol Britannia from Aeronaves de México was featured in Jet Over the Atlantic.

The film was the first production from Inter-Continent Films and Inter-Continent Releasing, two companies formed by Benedict Bogeaus and James R. Grainger. They announced a series of films, including Jet Over the Atlantic, The Gold Bug, Shoot Out!, Early Autumn and The Glass Wall.

Principal photography on Jet Over the Atlantic took place from April 27 to early June 1959 in Mexico City.

Jet Over the Atlantic marked George Raft's final major appearance in a film. His role was limited and a visibly ill Raft required oxygen on the set. The film was also notable for Ilona Massey's return to films after a 10-year absence, and as Guy Madison's last American film.

== Reception ==
Jet Over the Atlantic was primarily a B film relegated to the bottom half of double bills. With television stars Ilona Massey and Guy Madison in featured roles, the film was one of a cycle of late-1950s films that had the feel of a television episode. Reviewer Bosley Crowther of The New York Times merely called the film "a melodrama in which George Raft, Guy Madison and Virginia Mayo get caught aloft in a crippled plane... by some miscarriage of justice they all get down alive" Later reviews focused on the inadequacies of the script, casting choices and low production values, dismissing the film as woefully inadequate as either a thriller or disaster film.

== See also ==
- List of American films of 1959
