= The Man Who Changed His Mind =

1936 film

- Film poster using alternative title
- Directed by: Robert Stevenson
- Written by: John L. Balderston; Sidney Gilliat; L. Du Garde Peach
- Produced by: Michael Balcon
- Starring: Boris Karloff; Anna Lee
- Cinematography: Jack E. Cox
- Edited by: R. E. Dearing; Ben H. Hipkins; Alfred Roome
- Music by: Louis Levy; Jack Beaver; Hubert Bath
- Production company: Gainsborough Pictures
- Distributed by: Gaumont British Distributors
- Release date: 11 September 1936 (London)
- Running time: 66 min.
- Country: United Kingdom
- Language: English

The Man Who Changed His Mind is a 1936 British science fiction horror film starring Boris Karloff and Anna Lee. It was directed by Robert Stevenson and was produced by Gainsborough Pictures. The film was also known as The Brainsnatcher or The Man Who Lived Again.

== Plot ==
Dr. Laurience, a once-respectable scientist, begins to research the origins of the mind and soul in an isolated manor house, aided only by the promising surgeon Clare Wyatt and a wheelchair-using confederate named Clayton. The scientific community rejects his theories and Laurience risks losing everything for which he has worked so obsessively. To save his research, Laurience (pronounced "Lorenz") begins to use his discoveries in brain transference for his own nefarious purposes, replacing the mind of philanthropist Lord Haslewood with the personality of the crippled, caustic Clayton. With Lord Haslewood's wealth and prestige at his command, Laurience becomes an almost unstoppable mad scientist.

Despite a powerful patron and a state-of-the-art laboratory, chain-smoking Laurience remains the typical absent-minded professor, with eraser dust on the back of his wrinkled jacket, and in constant, desperate need of a strong hairbrush. However, he is not immune to the feminine charms of the lovely Dr. Wyatt. He attempts to take control of the body of Lord Haslewood's handsome son Dick in an effort to seduce Clare, but finds it impossible to disguise his own strange physicality even in the body of another man. Nor can he go without a cigarette in front of Clare although he is aware that young Dick Haslewood never smoked. Unfortunately, before transferring his mind with that of Dick, Laurience strangled Clayton, who was inhabiting the body of Lord Haslewood, so that Dick, afterwards a prisoner in Laurience's own body, would be hanged for the murder of the man presumed to be his father.

Realizing the truth, Clare and her friend Dr. Gratton return Laurience's mind to its proper body, but that body has been badly broken in a panicked fall out of a high window, taken while Dick Haslewood was in unwilling possession. Admitting he has wasted an incredible invention on a selfish and murderous scheme, the shattered Laurience tells Clare he should never have meddled with the human soul. He takes his knowledge to the grave, having changed his mind for the last time.

== Cast ==
- Boris Karloff as Dr. Laurience / Dick Haslewood
- Anna Lee as Dr. Clare Wyatt
- John Loder as Dick Haslewood / Dr. Laurience
- Frank Cellier as Lord Haslewood / Clayton
- Donald Calthrop as Clayton / Lord Haslewood
- Cecil Parker as Dr. Gratton
- Lyn Harding as Prof. Holloway
- Clive Morton as Journalist
- D.J. Williams as Landlord

== Production ==
The film was an early production effort from Ted Black.

== See also ==
- Boris Karloff filmography
