= Anna Lee =

British and American actress (1913–2004)

Anna Lee MBE
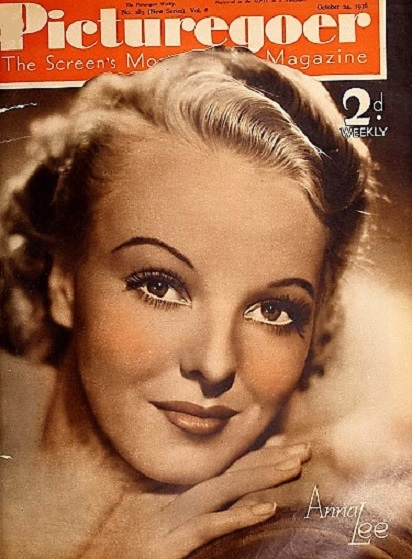
- Anna Lee on the cover of Picturegoer in 1936
- Born: Joan Boniface Winnifrith; 2 January 1913; Ightham, Kent, England
- Died: 14 May 2004 (aged 91); Beverly Hills, California, U.S.
- Resting place: Westwood Village Memorial Park Cemetery
- Other name: Joanna Boniface Stafford
- Citizenship: United Kingdom; United States
- Education: Royal Central School of Speech and Drama
- Occupation: Actress
- Years active: 1932–2003
- Spouses: Robert Stevenson (m. 1934; div. 1944) George Stafford (m. 1944; div. 1964) Robert Nathan (m. 1970; died 1985)
- Children: 5, including Venetia and Jeffrey
- Awards: 1983 Soapy Awards for Favorite Woman in a Mature Role in General Hospital; 1998 Soap Opera Digest Awards for Outstanding Actress in a Supporting Role in General Hospital

Anna Lee, MBE (born Joan Boniface Winnifrith; 2 January 1913 – 14 May 2004) was an English and American actress, labelled by studios "The British Bombshell".

== Early life ==
Anna Lee was born Joan Boniface Winnifrith in Ightham (pronounced 'Item'), Kent, the daughter of Bertram Thomas Winnifrith, a headmaster and Anglican rector, and his second wife, Edith Maude Digby-Roper. Her father supported his daughter in her desire to become an actress. Lee's grandfather, Reverend Alfred Winnifrith, was Rector of Mariansleigh. During WWI, he provided for Belgian refugees and was awarded the Medaille du Roi Albert. Lee's brother, Sir John Winnifrith, was a senior British civil servant who became permanent secretary at the Ministry of Agriculture. She was the goddaughter of Sir Arthur Conan Doyle and lifelong friend of his daughter, Dame Jean Conan Doyle.

== Career ==
=== Britain ===
Lee trained at the Central School of Speech Training and Dramatic Art at the Royal Albert Hall, and made her debut with a bit part in His Lordship (1932), when she was 19. She played a number of minor, often uncredited, roles in films during the early 1930s. Lee began to get more prominent roles in films to satisfy the Cinematograph Films Act 1927 (17 & 18 Geo. 5. c. 29), which was an act of the United Kingdom Parliament designed to stimulate the declining British film industry. She was known for her roles in films set amongst the wealthy, particularly in Chelsea Life (1933), in which she starred with Louis Hayward.

In 1934, Lee signed a contract with Gainsborough Pictures, the biggest British production company of the era. She played leading lady roles in a variety of different genres at Gainsborough, including the comedy-thriller The Camels Are Coming, the drama The Passing of the Third Floor Back, the horror film The Man Who Changed His Mind and the war film OHMS. She appeared in the 1935 Jessie Matthews musical First a Girl as the aristocratic playgirl and other woman, Princess Miranoff. In 1937, she starred in one of the studio's large-budget productions, King Solomon's Mines.

In 1933, Lee met the director Robert Stevenson, who became her first husband, while shooting The Camels Are Coming on location in Egypt. In 1937, she starred in his picture, Non-Stop New York, for Gaumont British. During 1938, she took time off from acting to give birth to her first child. In 1939, Lee and her husband switched to Ealing Studios run by Michael Balcon, the former head of Gainsborough. She played a 19th-century Irish music hall performer who falls in love with an aristocrat in the comedy Young Man's Fancy (1939) and a journalist who helps heroes thwart a foreign enemy's plot against Britain in The Four Just Men (1939).

Her final film in Britain was Return to Yesterday, a film about a young repertory theatre actress who falls in love with a Hollywood star she meets while touring in a small seaside town. Lee and Stevenson emigrated to the United States, her husband having gained a contract with David O. Selznick. She remained supportive of the British war effort during World War II, and in 1943 appeared alongside other British actors in Forever and a Day, a film made to raise money for British charities.

=== United States ===
After her move to Hollywood, she became associated with John Ford, appearing in several of his films, including How Green Was My Valley (1941), Fort Apache (1948), and Two Rode Together (1961). She co-starred with John Wayne and John Carroll in Flying Tigers (1942).

She had a lead role opposite Brian Donlevy and Walter Brennan in Fritz Lang's Hangmen Also Die! (1943), a wartime thriller relating to the assassination of Reinhard Heydrich. She worked for producer Val Lewton in the horror/thriller Bedlam (1946).

Lee made frequent appearances on television anthology series in the 1940s and 1950s, including Robert Montgomery Presents, The Ford Theatre Hour, Kraft Television Theatre, Armstrong Circle Theatre and Wagon Train. She made a guest appearance on Perry Mason as Crystal Durham in "The Case of the Unsuitable Uncle" (1962). She guest starred on Alfred Hitchcock Presents in the 1963 episode “Last Seen Wearing Blue Jeans” (S1E28).

In 1958, she returned to Britain to appear in John Ford's Gideon's Day (US Title: Gideon of Scotland Yard), in which she played the detective's wife. She had a small role as Sister Margaretta in The Sound of Music, one of the two nuns who thwarted the Nazis by removing car engine parts, allowing the Von Trapps to escape. Lee appeared in What Ever Happened to Baby Jane? (1962) in a main supporting role as Mrs. Bates, a neighbour of the sisters played by Joan Crawford and Bette Davis. In 1994, Lee took the leading role in the feature film What Can I Do?, directed by Wheeler Winston Dixon.

In later years, she became known as matriarch Lila Quartermaine on General Hospital and Port Charles. Lila was a contract role until 2003, when Lee was taken off contract and dropped to recurring status by Jill Farren Phelps, a move widely protested in the soap world. According to fellow General Hospital actress Leslie Charleson, Lee had been promised a job for life by former General Hospital executive producer Wendy Riche. When interviewed in 2007, Charleson said, "The woman was in her 90s. And then when the new powers-that-be took over they fired her, and it broke her heart. It was not necessary."

== Personal life ==
Lee married director Robert Stevenson, in 1933 and moved to Hollywood in 1939. They had two daughters, Venetia and Caroline. Venetia Stevenson, a former actress, was married to Don Everly of the Everly Brothers and has three children, Edan, Erin, and Stacy. Lee and Stevenson divorced in March 1944, with Venetia and Caroline electing to live with their father. Lee met her second husband, George Stafford, the pilot of the plane on her USO tour during the Second World War. They married on 8 June 1944, and had three sons, John, Stephen and Tim Stafford.

Tim Stafford is an actor under the stage name of Jeffrey Byron. Lee and Stafford divorced in 1964. Her final marriage was to novelist Robert Nathan (The Bishop's Wife, Portrait of Jennie), on 5 April 1970, and ended at his death in 1985.

Lee became a naturalised US citizen under the name Joanna Boniface Stafford (#123624) on 6 April 1945; certificate issued 8 June 1945 (#6183889, Los Angeles, California).

In the 1930s, Lee occupied a house at 49 Bankside in London; she was later interviewed by writer Gillian Tindall for a book written about the address, The House by the Thames, released in 2006. Built in 1710, the house has served as a home for coal merchants, an office, a boarding house, a hangout for derelicts, and a private residence in the 1900s. The house is listed in tour guides as a famous residence and has been variously claimed as possibly being home to Christopher Wren during the construction of St. Paul's Cathedral.

In 1981, a car accident left her paralysed from the waist down.

Lee was a staunch Conservative and stated that her views coincided with those of Sir Winston Churchill.

== Awards and honours ==
In the 1983 New Year Honours, Lee was awarded an MBE for services to the British community in Los Angeles, after fundraising for the White Cliffs at Dover and Ightham Mote. In 1995, her star was installed on Hollywood's Walk of Fame. On 21 May 2004, she was posthumously awarded a Daytime Emmy Lifetime Achievement Award; she was scheduled for months to receive the award, but died from pneumonia at age 91 before she could receive it. Her son, Jeffrey Byron, accepted the award on her behalf. On 16 July 2004, General Hospital aired a tribute to Lee by holding a memorial service for Lila Quartermaine.

== Filmography ==
=== Film ===
Year	Title	Role	Notes
1932	Ebb Tide		Uncredited
1932	Say It with Music		
1932	His Lordship	Scrub Girl Chorine	Uncredited
1933	The King's Cup	Minor Role	Uncredited
1933	Yes, Mr. Brown		Uncredited
1933	Mayfair Girl	Bit Role	Uncredited
1933	The Bermondsey Kid		
1933	Chelsea Life	Muriel Maxton	
1933	Mannequin	Babette	
1934	Faces	Madeleine Pelham	
1934	Rolling in Money	Lady Eggleby	
1934	Lucky Loser	Ursula Hamilton	
1934	The Camels Are Coming	Anita Rodgers	
1935	Heat Wave	Jane Allison	
1935	The Passing of the Third Floor Back	Vivian	
1935	First a Girl	Princess Miranoff	
1936	The Man Who Changed His Mind	Dr Wyatt	
1937	OHMS	Sally Briggs	
1937	King Solomon's Mines	Kathy O'Brien	
1937	Non-Stop New York	Jennie Carr	
1939	The Four Just Men	Ann Lodge	
1939	Young Man's Fancy	Miss Ada	
1940	Return to Yesterday	Carol Sands	
1940	Seven Sinners	Dorothy	
1941	My Life with Caroline	Caroline	
1941	How Green Was My Valley	Bronwyn	
1942	Flying Tigers	Brooke Elliott	
1942	Commandos Strike at Dawn	Judith Bowen	
1943	Forever and a Day	Cornelia Trimble-Pomfret	
1943	Flesh and Fantasy	Rowena	(Episode #2)
1943	Hangmen Also Die!	Masha Novotny	
1944	Summer Storm	Nadena Kalenin	
1946	Bedlam	Nell Bowen	
1946	G.I. War Brides	Linda Powell	
1947	The Ghost and Mrs. Muir	Mrs Miles Fairley	
1947	High Conquest	Marie Correl	
1948	Fort Apache	Mrs Emily Collingwood	
1948	Best Man Wins	Nancy Smiley	
1949	Prison Warden	Elisa Pennington Burnell	
1958	Gideon's Day (US Title: Gideon of Scotland Yard)	Mrs Kate Gideon	
1958	The Last Hurrah	Gert Minihan	
1959	The Horse Soldiers	Mrs Buford	
1959	This Earth Is Mine	Charlotte Rambeau	
1959	The Crimson Kimono	Mac	
1959	Jet Over the Atlantic	Ursula Leverett	
1960	The Big Night	Mrs Turner	
1961	Two Rode Together	Mrs Malaprop	
1962	The Man Who Shot Liberty Valance	Mrs. Prescott	Uncredited
1962	Jack the Giant Killer	Lady Constance	
1962	What Ever Happened to Baby Jane?	Mrs. Bates	
1962	Mutiny on the Bounty		Uncredited
1964	For Those Who Think Young	Laura Pruitt	
1964	The Unsinkable Molly Brown	Titanic Passenger in Lifeboat	Uncredited
1965	The Sound of Music	Sister Margaretta	
1966	7 Women	Mrs Russell	
1966	Picture Mommy Dead	Elsie Kornwald	
1967	In Like Flint	Elisabeth	
1968	Star!	Hostess	Uncredited
1978	Legend of the Northwest		
1979	The Night Rider	Lady Earl	
1987	Right Hand Man	Worn Woman	
1987	Beyond the Next Mountain	Governor's Wife	
1989	Listen to Me	Garson's Grandmother	
1989	Beverly Hills Brats	Gertie	
1994	What Can I Do	Elderly Woman	

=== Television ===
Year	Title	Role	Notes
1950	Robert Montgomery Presents	Frances Lawrence	1 episode
1951	Studio One	Anita Derr	1 episode
1952	Robert Montgomery Presents	Ann Hammond	2 episodes
1958	Peter Gunn	Sister Thomas Aquinas	1 episode
1958	Perry Mason	Lucille Alfred	1 episode
1960	The Barbara Stanwyck Show		1 episode
1960	Wagon Train	Allyris a nurse, and wife of Dr. Craven (portrayed by Carleton Young)	S4 E9 "The Colter Craven Story"
1962	Perry Mason	Crystal Durham	1 episode
1962	McHale's Navy	Pamela Parfrey	1 episode (Christmas) 11
1963	The Alfred Hitchcock Hour	Roberta Saunders	Season 1 Episode 28: "Last Seen Wearing Blue Jeans"
1964	The Movie Maker		TV movie
1965	Combat!	Sister Lescaut	(episode: "The Enemy")
1966	My Three Sons	Louise Allen	1 episode
1967	Gunsmoke	Amy Bassett	1 episode
1968	Mannix	Mrs. Harriman	(episode: "Edge of the Knife")
1970	Mission: Impossible	Maria Malik	(episode: "The Martyr")
1973	My Darling Daughters' Anniversary	Judge Barbara Hanline	TV movie
1977	Eleanor and Franklin: The White House Years	Laura Delano	TV movie
1978	The Beasts Are on the Streets	Mrs. Jackson	TV movie
1979–2003	General Hospital	Lila Quartermaine	(final appearance)
1980	Scruples	Aunt Wilhelmina	3 episodes
1997	Port Charles	Lila Quartermaine	

== Sources ==
- Chibnall, Steve. Quota Quickies: The Birth of the British 'B' Film. British Film Institute, 2007.
- Richards, Jeffrey (ed.). The Unknown 1930s: An Alternative History of the British Cinema, 1929–1939. I.B. Tauris & Co, 1998.
