= Edan Everly =

American musician and singer-songwriter

Edan Donald Everly
- Born: Edan Donald Everly; August 25, 1968 (age 57); Burbank, California, U.S.
- Origin: Hollywood, California
- Genres: Rock; Experimental
- Occupations: Singer-songwriter, musician
- Instruments: Vocals guitar multi-instrumentalist
- Years active: 1992–present
- Website: edaneverly.com

Edan Donald Everly (born August 25, 1968) is an American musician and singer-songwriter.

== Early life ==
Everly is the son of Don Everly and nephew to Phil Everly of the Everly Brothers.

His mother is actress Venetia Stevenson. His siblings are sisters Stacy Everly and Erin Everly; he has a half sister, Venetia Everly. His maternal grandparents were the director Robert Stevenson and actress Anna Lee. His paternal grandparents were Ike and Margaret Everly.

Edan Everly is the father of one child, a daughter named Lily Edan Everly.

== Career ==
In 1992, Everly and his band called "Edan" released an album on Hollywood Records titled Dead Flowers. In September 2006, Everly self-released his first solo album, For the Insanity of It All. His second album, Songs from Bikini Atoll, was released in November 2011.
