= Robert Stevenson (filmmaker) =

British-American film director (1905–1986)

- Born: Robert Edward Stevenson; 31 March 1905; Buxton, Derbyshire, England
- Died: 30 April 1986 (aged 81); Santa Barbara, California, US
- Occupations: Director, screenwriter
- Years active: 1928–1976
- Spouses: Cecilie L Leslie (m. 1929; div. 1934) Anna Lee (m. 1934; div. 1944) Frances Holyoke Howard (m. 1944, divorced) Ursula Henderson (m. 1963)
- Children: 3, including Venetia Stevenson
- Relatives: Edan Everly (grandson)

Robert Edward Stevenson (31 March 1905 – 30 April 1986) was a British-American screenwriter and film director.

After directing a number of British films, including King Solomon's Mines (1937), he was contracted by David O. Selznick and moved to Hollywood, but was loaned to other studios, directing Jane Eyre (1943). He directed 19 live-action films for The Walt Disney Company in the 1950s, 1960s and 1970s.

Stevenson has a long career as a filmmaker and is known for directing the musical fantasy Mary Poppins (1964), for which Julie Andrews won the Academy Award for Best Actress and Stevenson received a nomination for Best Director. His other Disney films include the first two Herbie films, The Love Bug (1968) and Herbie Rides Again (1974), as well as Bedknobs and Broomsticks (1971). Three of his films featured English actor David Tomlinson.

== Education ==
Having attended Shrewsbury School, Stevenson won a scholarship to study at St John's College, Cambridge. There he won the John Bernard Seely Prize for Aeronautics, and in 1927 graduated with a first-class MA (Cantab) degree in the Mechanical Sciences Tripos (engineering). He was also president of the university's Liberal Club, editor of the student Granta magazine, and while conducting postgraduate research in psychology he was elected president of the prestigious Cambridge Union Society. On leaving Cambridge, his parents gave him six weeks to find a job, and he gained employment as the assistant of Michael Balcon.

== Career ==
=== British films ===
Stevenson started to write scripts, providing the story of Balaclava (1928). He also worked on the scripts for Greek Street (1930), The Ringer (1931), Night in Montmartre (1931), The Calendar (1931), Michael and Mary (1931) with Edna Best and Herbert Marshall and Sunshine Susie (1931) with Jack Hulbert, Lord Babs (1932), The Faithful Heart (1932) with Best and Marshall, and Love on Wheels (1932) with Hulbert.

Stevenson's debut feature film as director was a Jack Hulbert–Cicely Courtneidge musical, Happy Ever After (1932), a co-production shot in Germany and produced by Eric Pommer. He also wrote the British-German co productions F.P.1 (1933) and Early to Bed (1933).

Stevenson went on to write and direct Falling for You (1933) with Hulbert and Courtneidge, and did some uncredited direction on The Camels Are Coming (1934) with Hulbert. On that film he met Anna Lee, who became his wife in 1935. He was a producer on Little Friend (1934).

Stevenson worked as writer on Thunder in the East (1934) and The Only Girl (1933) with Charles Boyer.

Stevenson received acclaim for Tudor Rose (1936), a film of the Lady Jane Grey story which Stevenson wrote and directed. He directed The Man Who Changed His Mind (1936) with Boris Karloff and Anna Lee, then another with Hulbert, Jack of All Trades (1936).

Stevenson wrote Windbag the Sailor (1936) for Will Hay and Paradise for Two (1937) for Hulbert.

Stevenson directed the action adventure movie King Solomon's Mines (1937) with Lee, Cedric Hardwicke and Paul Robeson. He did a science fiction film with Lee, Non-Stop New York (1937).

Stevenson went to Gainbsorough to do Owd Bob (1938) with Will Fyffe, The Ware Case (1938) with Clive Brook, Young Man's Fancy (1939) with Lee, and Return to Yesterday (1940) with Brook and Lee. He worked on the script for most of the latter films. Michael Balcon wrote the last two films "did not really come off" calling Stevenson:

A man of high intellectual capacity—his academic record at Cambridge was outstanding and alternative careers were certainly open to him— Bob had set his heart on films and up to this point his record had been very good indeed. By absolute conviction of conscience he was against war and was a deeply troubled man at this time.

=== Hollywood films ===
Stevenson received an offer to go to Hollywood to work for David O. Selznick along with Alfred Hitchcock. Selznick only made films intermittently, but he regularly signed talent to long-term contracts and loaned them out to other studios. He loaned Stevenson to RKO he directed Tom Brown's School Days (1940). He went to Universal to direct a new version of Back Street (1941) with Charles Boyer then went back to RKO for Joan of Paris (1942) with Michèle Morgan, a big hit.

Stevenson wrote and directed an adaptation of Jane Eyre (1943) for Selznick starring Orson Welles and Joan Fontaine. He was also one of several directors on Forever and a Day (1943).

Stevenson directed Hedy Lamarr in Dishonored Lady (1947) and Dick Powell in To the Ends of the Earth (1948).

He returned to RKO, now under the control of Howard Hughes, to make The Woman on Pier 13 (originally, I Married a Communist, 1949). He followed it with Walk Softly, Stranger (1950) with Joseph Cotten, My Forbidden Past (1951) with Robert Mitchum and Ava Gardner, and The Las Vegas Story (1952) with Jane Russell and Victor Mature. He also did some uncredited directing on Macao (1952).

=== Television ===
Stevenson went into directing television and directed six episodes of the first season of Gunsmoke during which it first went to the top of the TV ratings. He directed over 100 TV episodes in five years including: The Ford Television Theatre, Your Jeweler's Showcase, Footlights Theater, Jane Wyman Presents The Fireside Theatre, Cavalcade of America, Schlitz Playhouse, The Star and the Story, Star Stage, The 20th Century-Fox Hour, The Joseph Cotten Show, Alfred Hitchcock Presents and The Christophers.

=== Walt Disney ===
Stevenson worked for the Disney Company in 1956 for six weeks and ending up making 19 films in 20 years. His early credits were Johnny Tremain (1957), a story set in the American Revolution, and Old Yeller (1957), a boy and his dog tale. In 2019, Old Yeller was selected by the Library of Congress for preservation in the National Film Registry for being "culturally, historically, or aesthetically significant".

Stevenson did episodes of Disney's Zorro, then directed a film about Ireland, Darby O'Gill and the Little People (1959), and an adaptation of Kidnapped (1960). He had a commercial success with the comedy The Absent-Minded Professor (1961) and the adventure film In Search of the Castaways (1962). Son of Flubber (1963) was a popular sequel to The Absent-Minded Professor, and The Misadventures of Merlin Jones (1964), a teen comedy, was an unexpected hit, leading to a sequel, The Monkey's Uncle (1965).

None did as well at the box office as Mary Poppins (1964), which gained domestic rentals of $45,000,000 and won five Oscars.

Also among Stevenson's Disney films was the Hayley Mills comedy That Darn Cat! (1965). Stevenson and Disney focused on comedies: The Gnome-Mobile (1967) with Walter Brennan, Blackbeard's Ghost (1968) with Peter Ustinov and Dean Jones, The Love Bug (1968) with Jones, which was another hit, and My Dog, the Thief (1969).

Bedknobs and Broomsticks (1971) was an attempt to repeat the success of Mary Poppins. Stevenson directed Herbie Rides Again (1974) with Ken Berry and Helen Hayes, and the adventure story The Island at the Top of the World (1974). One of Our Dinosaurs Is Missing (1975), with Hayes and Ustinov, was a comedy. Stevenson's last feature was The Shaggy D.A. (1976) with Dean Jones.

In July 1977, Variety reported that his track record at Disney made him "the most commercially successful director in the history of films." At the end of 1976, he had 16 films on Variety's list of all-time domestic rental films, more than any other director at the time, with the second most successful having only 12. The Shaggy D.A. was to become his 17th, all being Disney films. The total US and Canadian rentals for these 17 pictures was $188,000,000, which Variety said translated into roughly $250 million in world rentals or an estimated world box office gross of $750 million.

== Personal life ==
Stevenson was married four times. He married his first wife Cecilie L Leslie in 1929 and divorced her in 1934, then married English actress Anna Lee in that same year. They lived on London's Bankside for five years, moving to Hollywood in 1939, where he remained for many years. They had two daughters, Venetia and Caroline, before divorcing in March 1944.

During World War II, he became an American citizen and served with Frank Capra in the U.S. Army Signal Corps.

He married Frances Holyoke Howard on October 8, 1944, they later divorced. They had one son, Hugh Howard Stevenson. In 1963 he married Ursula Henderson, and they remained married until Stevenson's death in 1986. Robert Stevenson's widow, Ursula Henderson, appeared as herself in the documentary Locked in the Tower: The Men behind Jane Eyre in 2007.

== Filmography ==
Year	Film	Notes
1928	Balaclava	Screenwriter
1930	Greek Street	Screenwriter
1931	The Ringer	Screenwriter
1931	Night in Montmartre	Screenwriter
1931	The Calendar	Screenwriter
1931	Michael and Mary	Screenwriter
1931	Sunshine Susie	Screenwriter
1932	Lord Babs	Screenwriter
1932	The Faithful Heart	Screenwriter
1932	Love on Wheels	Screenwriter
1932	Happy Ever After	Directorial debut for Stevenson. The only German film he directed.
1933	Falling For You	His directorial debut in the United Kingdom
1933	F.P.1	Screenwriter only
1933	Early to Bed	Screenwriter only
1933	The Only Girl	Screenwriter only
1934	The Camels Are Coming	Producer, Uncredited co-director
1934	Little Friend	Producer only
1934	The Battle	Screenwriter only
1936	Tudor Rose	
1936	The Man Who Changed His Mind	
1936	Jack of All Trades	
1936	Windbag the Sailor	Screenwriter only
1937	King Solomon's Mines	
1937	Non-Stop New York	
1937	Paradise for Two	Screenwriter only
1938	Owd Bob	
1938	The Ware Case	
1939	Young Man's Fancy	
1940	Return to Yesterday	Stevenson's last United Kingdom film.
1940	Tom Brown's School Days	Stevenson's USA directorial debut.
1941	Back Street	Remake of the 1932 Universal Pictures film. Stevenson's only film for Universal Pictures.
1942	Joan of Paris	Nominated for the Academy Award for original music score. Stevenson's first film for RKO Radio Pictures
1943	Forever and a Day	RKO film with a record breaking 22 directors, writers, and producers.
1943	Jane Eyre	The only feature film he directed for 20th Century Fox
1944	Know Your Ally: Britain	Documentary Short (uncredited). Produced for the United States War Department and the United States Signal Corps.
1946	American Creed	Short
1947	Dishonored Lady	Stevenson's only film for United Artists.
1948	To the Ends of the Earth	Stevenson's only film for Columbia Pictures.
1949	The Woman on Pier 13	Stevenson's first film for RKO since 1943. Also known as I Married a Communist
1950	Walk Softly, Stranger	Filming completed in 1948, but not released until 1950.
1951	My Forbidden Past	
1952	The Las Vegas Story	
1952	Macao	(uncredited), Stevenson's final film for RKO.
1952	The Ford Television Theatre	TV series (3 episodes: 1952–1953). Stevenson's Television Directorial debut, sponsored by Ford.
1953	Cavalcade of America	TV series (8 episodes: 1953–1955)
1953	General Electric Theater	TV series (2 episodes: 1953–1956). Sponsored by General Electric.
1955	Atomic Energy as a Force for Good	(short)
1955	The Star and the Story	TV series (3 episodes: 1955–1956)
1955	The 20th Century Fox Hour	TV series (2 episodes: 1955–1956)
1955	Alfred Hitchcock Presents	TV series (7 episodes: 1955–1959)
1955	Gunsmoke	TV series (6 episodes)
1957	The Christophers	TV series (1 episode: "Sentence Deferred")
1957	Johnny Tremain	Stevenson's first film as director since 1952 and his first with Disney (continued until 1976). Based on the 1944 novel by Esther Forbes
1957	Old Yeller	One of Stevenson's most successful films; sequel: Savage Sam (1963). Based on the book by Fred Gipson.
1957	Disneyland	TV series (26 episodes: 1957–1982)
1957	Zorro	TV series (3 episodes); his final TV series he directed.
1959	Darby O'Gill and the Little People	
1960	Kidnapped	Screenwriter and director
1961	The Absent-Minded Professor	Nominated – DGA Award – Outstanding Directorial Achievement in Motion Pictures. Was remade as a 1988 television series and a 1997 remake, Flubber.
1962	In Search of the Castaways	
1963	Son of Flubber	Sequel of The Absent-Minded Professor.
1964	The Misadventures of Merlin Jones	Followed by the 1965 sequel, The Monkey's Uncle
1964	Mary Poppins	Nominated – Academy Award for Best Director; Blue Ribbon Award – Best Foreign Film; Nominated – DGA Award – Outstanding Directorial Achievement in Motion Pictures
1965	The Monkey's Uncle	Sequel to 1964's The Misadventures of Merlin Jones
1965	That Darn Cat!	Led to a 1997 remake, That Darn Cat
1967	The Gnome-Mobile	
1968	Blackbeard's Ghost	Was released in Japan in 1976 and Australia in 1980.
1968	The Love Bug	One of two Herbie franchise films directed by Stevenson.
1969	My Dog, the Thief	
1971	Bedknobs and Broomsticks	Sant Jordi Award for Best Children's Film
1974	Herbie Rides Again	Sequel to The Love Bug.
1974	The Island at the Top of the World	
1975	One of Our Dinosaurs Is Missing	
1976	The Shaggy D.A.	Sequel to 1959's The Shaggy Dog. Was Stevenson's final film for Disney, and his final original film.
1985	The Walt Disney Comedy and Magic Revue	(video short) (archive footage)

== See also ==
- List of Academy Award winners and nominees from Great Britain
