= The Camels Are Coming (film) =

1934 British film by Tim Whelan

- Film poster
- Directed by: Tim Whelan
- Written by: Guy Bolton; Jack Hulbert; W. P. Lipscomb
- Produced by: Michael Balcon
- Starring: Jack Hulbert; Anna Lee; Hartley Power; Harold Huth
- Narrated by: E.V.H. Emmett
- Cinematography: Glen Macwilliams
- Edited by: Fredrick Y. Smith
- Music by: Jack Beaver; Louis Levy
- Production company: Gainsborough Pictures
- Distributed by: Gaumont British Distributors
- Release date: 1 December 1934
- Running time: 79 minutes
- Country: United Kingdom
- Language: English

The Camels Are Coming is a 1934 British comedy adventure film directed by Tim Whelan and starring Jack Hulbert, Anna Lee, Hartley Power and Harold Huth. A British officer in the Royal Egyptian Air Force combats drug smugglers.

== Plot ==
British officer Jack Campbell has arrived in Cairo with the first aircraft of the newly-formed Egyptian Air Force. Jack commands the first group of volunteer aviators. The general commanding the Air Force gives him the mission to stop Nicholas, an American posing as an archaeologist, but involved in drug trafficking.

Nicholas has the help of an Arab sheikh, whose caravans crisscross the desert. During a patrol, Jack intercepts one of these caravans without finding anything. Just then, an aircraft piloted by a beautiful aviator, Anita Rogers lands nearby. Back in Cairo, Jack is sure Anita has something to do with the criminal activities, and follows her.

Jack manages to steal a suitcase that a stranger gives to Anita. After a chase among the pyramids of Gizeh, the suitcase turns out to contain only cigarettes. The escapade makes headlines and Jack feels the wrath of the general's anger. Shortly after, Anita, who has fallen in love with Jack, apologizes and offers to help Jack by playing the role of the Sheikh's wife while Jack pretends to be the sheikh.

While disguised as Arab, Jack offers Nicholas the chance to sell him hashish. The pretense is uncovered when the real Sheikh arrives. A fight ensues with Jack managing to knock out the two drug traffickers. Jack and Anita, with Nicholas slung over a horse, are pursued by the sheikh's men.

Jack and Anita take refuge in the ruins of a fort, where they are soon besieged but manage to warn Cairo, thanks to a passenger pigeon. The general immediately sends aircraft and troops to help them.

With the drug smugglers put away, Jack and Anita plan their happy future.

== Cast ==
- Jack Hulbert as Jack Campbell
- Anna Lee as Anita Rodgers
- Hartley Power as Nicholas
- Harold Huth as Doctor Zhiga
- Allan Jeayes as Sheikh
- Peter Gawthorne as Colonel Fairley
- Norma Whalley as Tourist
- Peggy Simpson as Tourist
- Tony De Lungo as Smuggler's servant
- Percy Parsons as Arab

== Production ==
Based on a story by Tim Whelan and Russell Medcraft, The Camels Are Coming was directed by Tim Whelan, an American who made a number of British films. It was filmed at Islington Studios and on location in Egypt around Cairo and Gizeh including at the famous Shepheard's Hotel.

The aircraft used in The Camels Are Coming were:

- Avro 626
- de Havilland DH.60G Gipsy Moth II c/n 3053, SU-ABB
- de Havilland DH.60G Gipsy II Moth c/n 1914, SU-ABF

Many of the scenes in The Camels Are Coming later had to be reshot in London at the Gainsborough Pictures studios, as sand had got into the cameras, and high winds prevented the recording of dialogue.

The Camels Are Coming was a major success at the British box office, but was not released in the United States. (Note: During the filming of The Camels Are Coming, Anna Lee met Robert Stevenson, whom she subsequently married.)

=== Surviving Recording ===
On the 1968 Music for Pleasure (record label) LP record release, (A Fabulous Cast Sing and Play) 'The Hits of Noel Gay', (MFP1236), Track 3, Side 2, includes 'Who's Been Polishing the Sun' ?, with Hulbert Assisted by 'Eddie and Rex and Orchestra'. Before the film's re-release on commercial dvd, in 'British Comedies of the 1930s, Volume 8', forty-eight years later in 2016, this release was the only way the recording could be heard. (Brian Rust wrote its liner notes).

== Reception ==
In the review of The Camels Are Coming, the TV Guide wrote: "Lightweight comedy is slightly above average for British offerings of the period."
