= Out to Win =

Out to Win may refer to:

- Out to Win (play), a 1921 British melodrama by Roland Pertwee
- Out to Win (1923 film), a silent film adaptation of the play
- Out to Win (2015 film), a documentary film on LGBT people in sports
- Out to Win (TV series), a Singapore television show starring Fann Wong
