= Neal Arden =

English actor and writer (1909–2014)

- Born: Arthur Neal Aiston; 27 December 1909; Fulham, London, England
- Died: 4 June 2014 (aged 104); Huntingdon, Cambridgeshire, England
- Occupations: Actor, policeman, playwright, songwriter
- Years active: 1934–1977

Neal Arden (born Arthur Neal Aiston; 27 December 1909 – 4 June 2014) was an English-born actor and writer who appeared in films, television shows, theatre productions and radio programs. He was born in Fulham, London.

In 1928, Arden moved to Southern Rhodesia and served in the British South Africa Police (BSAP). Two years later, he returned to Great Britain to pursue an acting career. His screen debut came in the 1934 film version of Princess Charming. Other films include "Pimpernel" Smith, John Wesley and The Shakedown. He also worked in television, appearing in series like Ivanhoe and Z-Cars. Arden's most notable role was on the BBC radio show Housewives' Choice, as a host for 20 years from 1946. His last acting credit was in 1977.

== Later life ==
Arden also wrote plays and songs. In 2002 he collaborated with lyricist Eddie Lewisohn on an album of songs which were recorded by Paul Hazel. In 2005, he published his autobiography called A Man of Many Parts. In 2003 he retired to East Anglia with his wife Julia. Arden died on 4 June 2014.

== Filmography ==
| Year | Title | Role | Notes |
|---|---|---|---|
| 1934 | Princess Charming | Minor Role | Uncredited |
| 1935 | The Public Life of Henry the Ninth | Minor Role | Uncredited |
| 1936 | Nothing Like Publicity | | |
| 1938 | Life of St. Paul | Paul | |
| 1939 | The Four Just Men | | Uncredited |
| 1941 | "Pimpernel" Smith | Second Prisoner | |
| 1942 | The Young Mr. Pitt | Minor Role | Uncredited |
| 1949 | Train of Events | The Compere | (segment "The Composer") |
| 1953 | The Straw Man | O'Brien | |
| 1954 | John Wesley | William Holland | |
| 1954 | Souls in Conflict | Frank | |
| 1958 | The Man Who Wouldn't Talk | | Uncredited |
| 1959 | The Giant Behemoth | TV Newscaster | Uncredited |
| 1960 | The Shakedown | Harry Bowers | |
| 1961 | The Frightened City | Head Waiter-Taboo Club | |
| 1964 | The Third Secret | Mr. Morgan | |
| 1964 | Night Train to Paris | Insp. Escalier | |
| 1964 | Delayed Flight | Hicks | |
| 1969 | The Assassination Bureau | 'La Belle Amie' Client | Uncredited |
| 1969 | The Best House in London | Dr. Livingstone | |
