= Impromptu (1932 film) =

1932 film

- Directed by: William McGann
- Screenplay by: Roland Pertwee
- Produced by: Irving Asher
- Production company: Warner Brothers First National Productions
- Release date: 1932
- Running time: 12 minutes
- Country: United Kingdom
- Language: English

Impromptu is a 1932 British comedy short directed by William C. McGann, starring Richard Bird, Florence Desmond and Dodo Watts. It was written by Roland Pertwee.

== Preservation status ==
The British Film Institute National Archive holds a collection of stills but no film or video materials.

== Cast ==
- Richard Bird
- Florence Desmond
- Dodo Watts

== Reception ==
Kine Weekly wrote: "A comedy which furnishes an appropriate background for the clever mimicry of the star, who cleverly impersonates stage and screen favourites."

The Daily Film Renter wrote: "The excellent impersonations of Florence Desmond form the basis of this neat little fill-up. The artiste gives realistic impressions of Tallulah Bankhead, Marlene Dietrich and Gracie Fields."
