= Percy Walsh =

British actor (1888–1952)

Percy Walsh (24 April 1888 in Luton, Bedfordshire – 19 January 1952 in London) was a British stage and film actor. His stage work included appearing in the London premieres of R.C.Sherriff's Journey's End (1928) and Agatha Christie's And Then There Were None (1943) and Appointment with Death (1945).

== Selected filmography ==
- How's Chances? (1934) - Castellano
- The Office Wife (1934, Short) - Simms
- Jew Süss (1934) - (uncredited)
- The Green Pack (1934) - Monty Carr
- Dirty Work (1934) - Customer With Umbrella (uncredited)
- The Man Who Knew Too Much (1934) - Detective Inspector (uncredited)
- Open All Night (1934)
- Death Drives Through (1935) - Mr. Lord
- The Case of Gabriel Perry (1935) - William Read
- Me and Marlborough (1935) - Naylor
- Boys Will Be Boys (1935) - Prison Governor
- Checkmate (1935) - Mr Curtail
- Brown on Resolution (1935) - Kapitan von Lutz
- The River House Mystery (1935) - (uncredited)
- Admirals All (1935) - Adm. Westerham
- King of the Damned (1935) - Capt. Perez
- The Prisoner of Corbal (1936) - Gamekeeper
- Educated Evans (1936) - Capt. Reid
- Windbag the Sailor (1936) - Captain of the 'Rob Roy' (uncredited)
- Annie Laurie (1936, Short)
- Take a Chance (1937) - (uncredited)
- Dark Journey (1937) - Captain of Swedish Packet
- Knights for a Day (1937) - Lord Southdown
- Oh, Mr Porter! (1937) - Superintendent
- It's in the Blood (1938) - Jules Barres
- The Gang Show (1938) - E.H. McCullough
- Annie Laurie (1939) - Alec Laurie
- The Four Just Men (1939) - Prison Governor
- Traitor Spy (1939) - Otto Lemnel
- Pastor Hall (1940) - Herr Veit
- Ten Days in Paris (1940)
- Let George Do It! (1940) - Schwartz - Spy Chieftain
- Old Bill and Son (1941) - Gustave (uncredited)
- Inspector Hornleigh Goes To It (1941) - Inspector Blow
- "Pimpernel" Smith (1941) - Dvorak
- Jeannie (1941) - French Customs Man
- The Common Touch (1941) - McFarlane (uncredited)
- Mr. Proudfoot Shows a Light (1941, Short) - Officer
- The Big Blockade (1942) - German
- Breach of Promise (1942) - Saxon Rose
- Secret Mission (1942) - Fayolle
- Much Too Shy (1942)
- Talk About Jacqueline (1942) - (uncredited)
- Thursday's Child ( Jan' 1943) - Charles Lennox—re-released & edited 1946
- The Adventures of Tartu (1943) - Dr. Willendorf
- They Met in the Dark (1943) - Police Sergeant
- I Live in Grosvenor Square (1945) - Merridew
- Meet Me at Dawn (1947) - Shooting Gallery Man
- The Courtneys of Curzon Street (1947) - Sir Frank Murchison
- Fame Is the Spur (1947) - Suddaby
- This Was a Woman (1948) - Professor of Music
- One Night with You (1948) - Hotel Proprietor
- The Guinea Pig (1948) - Alec Stevens
- Scott of the Antarctic (1948) - Chairman of Meeting
- Now Barabbas (1949) - Jones
- Stop Press Girl (1949) - Editor, Evening Comet
- Train of Events (1949) - District Superintendent (segment "The Engine Driver")
- Golden Salamander (1950) - Guillard
- The Happiest Days of Your Life (1950) - Monsieur Joue
- Dick Barton at Bay (1950) - Prof. Mitchell (final film role)
