= Joan Kemp-Welch =

British actress (1906–1999)

- Born: 23 September 1906; Wimbledon, Surrey, England
- Died: 5 July 1999 (aged 92); London, England
- Other name: Glory Vincent Green
- Occupations: Actress; Director; Producer
- Years active: 1926 - 1981
- Spouse(s): Ben Wright (1936-1950) (divorced); Peter Moffatt (1959-1999) (her death)

Joan Kemp-Welch (23 September 1906 – 5 July 1999) was a British stage and film actress, who later went on to become a television director. After making her stage debut in 1926 at the Q Theatre, Kemp-Welch made her film debut in 1933 and appeared in fifteen films over the next decade largely in supporting or minor roles. Occasionally she played more substantial parts as in Hard Steel and They Flew Alone (both 1942).

Post-Second World War, she moved into television working as both a producer and director of television plays and episodes of television series. In 1959 she was one of the winners at the Society of Film and Television Arts Television Awards. She also won the Prix Italia for her TV version of Harold Pinter's The Lover in 1963; and in the same year was the first woman to receive the Desmond Davis BAFTA for creative work in television. In 1964 she directed A Midsummer Night's Dream for ITV's Play of the Week. The same year she directed four Noël Coward adaptations for A Choice of Coward. In the early 1980s, she directed two episodes of the Granada Television series Lady Killers. Other work included directing episodes of Upstairs, Downstairs and Armchair Theatre.

== Selected filmography ==
=== Actress ===
| Year | Title | Role | Notes |
|---|---|---|---|
| 1933 | The Veteran of Waterloo | Norah Brewster | |
| 1935 | Once a Thief | Alice | |
| 1936 | The Avenging Hand | Madame Ambrosia | |
| 1936 | All In | | |
| 1937 | London Melody | Maid | |
| 1937 | School for Husbands | Maid | |
| 1937 | The Girl in the Taxi | Suzanne Dupont | |
| 1938 | The Citadel | Nurse Assisting at Childbirth | Uncredited |
| 1938 | Busman's Honeymoon | Aggie Twitterton | |
| 1941 | 'Pimpernel' Smith | School-Teacher | |
| 1941 | Jeannie | Jeannie's sister | |
| 1942 | Hard Steel | Janet Mortimer | |
| 1942 | They Flew Alone | Mrs. Johnson | |
| 1942 | Talk About Jacqueline | | Uncredited |
| 1943 | Rhythm Serenade | Minor Role | (final film role) |

=== Films ===
- Laudes Evangelii, 1952 ballet by Léonide Massine to the music by Valentino Bucchi (1961).
- All God's Chillun Got Wings, 1958 film featuring Lloyd Reckord, Connie Smith and Ida Shepley.

== Bibliography ==
- Rotherwell, Kenneth S. A History of Shakespeare on Screen: A Century of Film and Television. Cambridge University Press, 2004.
