= Roland Pertwee =

British writer and actor (1885–1963)

- Pertwee in the 1920s
- Born: 15 May 1885; Hove, Sussex, England
- Died: 26 April 1963 (aged 77); Sandhurst, Kent, England
- Occupations: Writer, playwright, film director, actor
- Spouse: Avice Scholtz (m. 1911; div. 1921)
- Children: Michael; Jon
- Relatives: Sean Pertwee (grandson); Bill Pertwee (cousin)
- Writing career
- Period: 20th century

Roland Pertwee (15 May 1885 – 26 April 1963) was an English playwright, film and television screenwriter, director and actor. He was the father of Doctor Who actor Jon Pertwee and playwright and screenwriter Michael Pertwee. He was also the second cousin of actor Bill Pertwee and grandfather of actors Sean Pertwee and Dariel Pertwee.

From the 1910s to 1950s, he worked as a writer on many British films, providing either the basic story or full screenplay. He was one of many writers who worked on the script of A Yank at Oxford starring Robert Taylor and Vivien Leigh, the film in which his son Jon made his screen debut, and on Caravan.

While he seemingly preferred writing, he acted in ten films (1915–45) and directed Breach of Promise (1942), which he also wrote.

== Life and career ==
Pertwee had French Huguenot ancestry (his surname was an Anglicisation of "Perthuis"; the origins of his surname being "de Perthuis de Laillevault", the family being Counts descended from Charlemagne). His career began as a painter after he gained a scholarship to the Royal Academy Schools at the age of 17 and exhibited his first portrait at the Royal Academy two years later. He studied in Paris, then returned to London, where he began to write and act.

Pertwee married in 1911, and he and his wife went to Australia for a year, while Pertwee appeared on stage with a touring company. The couple had two children. He worked as a musician and as an actor.

His writing career essentially began in 1914, when four of his short plays, including Swank, were produced in London. Pertwee had a role in Caste (1915). He could also be seen in The Second Mrs Tanqueray (1916). The following year a novel The Transactions of Lord Louis Lewis was published.

He joined the army in 1916 and was invalided out in Christmas 1917.

He adapted a play Quinneys (1919), in which he also played a small role. He wrote The Bridal Chair (1919), Hope (1919), Charity (1919), The Right Element (1919), Faith (1919), The Last Rose of Summer (1920), and Aunt Rachel (1920). Pertwee co wrote a play Out to Win (1921) which was filmed in 1921. Pertwee divorced his wife in 1921. He wrote the plays Creaking Chair (1926) and Interference (1927).

He wrote the scripts for 'the films Packing Up (1927), and The Vortex (1928). Interference (1928), based on his play, was filmed in Hollywood.

His play Heat Wave, written in collaboration with Denise Robins, was produced at the St James's Theatre, London, in 1929. It was later filmed as The Road to Singapore (1931).

=== Hollywood ===
Pertwee moved to Hollywood, where he wrote I Like Your Nerve (1931), and Honor of the Family (1931). He also wrote a story for Marilyn Miller that was not used. A play The Metropolitan Players had a run on Broadway in 1932.

Back in England he wrote Murder on the Second Floor (1932); Love Me, Love My Dog (1932); Postal Orders (1932); Impromptu (1932); Help Yourself (1932); A Voice Said Goodnight (1932); A Letter of Warning (1932); The Silver Greyhound(1932); Illegal (1932); Blind Spot (1932); Sleeping Car (1933), for Anatole Litvak; The Ghoul (1933) with Boris Karloff in the lead and The Crucifix (1934).

In 1934, Pertwee signed a contract with Columbia Pictures. He also wrote British Agent (1934), directed by Michael Curtiz and The Night of the Party (1935), based on his play, directed by Michael Powell. He was credited on Honours Easy (1935), based on his play, and Man of the Moment (1935). Without Regret (1935) was based on his play.

In 1936, it was announced Alfred Hitchcock would film his novel Such an Enmity but no movie resulted.

He did some work on the scripts for Two's Company (1936) and King Solomon's Mines (1937). He wrote Non-Stop New York (1937), and Dinner at the Ritz (1937), and was one of many writers on A Yank at Oxford (1938).

Pertwee wrote Kicking Around the Moon (1938), The Ware Case (1938) and A Voice Said Goodnight (1938) for TV.

=== World War II ===
He wrote A Spy in Black (1939) and adapted The Four Just Men (1939) in which he also had an acting role. He wrote Young Man's Fancy (1939), They Came by Night (1940), Return to Yesterday (1940), and The Proud Valley (1940). He wrote a short, Dangerous Comment (1940), and did It Happened to One Man (1940), and Freedom Radio (1941). In 1940, his autobiography Master of None was published.

Pertwee wrote Pimpernel Smith (1941) and had a small role on screen. He appeared in The Day Will Dawn (1942), Talk About Jacqueline (1942), The Gentle Sex (1943), The Halfway House (1944), They Were Sisters (1945), Nightbeat (1947).

In addition, he also wrote Jeannie (1941), Breach of Promise (1942) (which he also directed), Talk About Jacqueline (1942), The Gentle Sex (1943), The Lamp Still Burns (1943), The Night Invader (1943) and The Halfway House (1944).

=== Gainsborough ===
Pertwee went to Gainsborough Pictures to work on the melodramas Madonna of the Seven Moons (1945), They Were Sisters (1945), Caravan (1946), and The Magic Bow (1946).

His play Pink String and Sealing Wax was filmed in 1945. He wrote Nightbeat (1947), Silent Dust (1949) (based on his play The Paragon), Diamond City (1949), and Captain Blackjack (1950). He wrote for TV on Rheingold Theatre and did the feature Give Them a Ring (1954).

=== The Grove Family ===
In 1954, he and his elder son Michael created The Grove Family – generally regarded as being the first soap opera on British television – for the BBC. Having previously written an episode of Douglas Fairbanks, Jr., Presents, this marked Pertwee's second and final foray into television writing. Like many BBC television productions of the era, it was broadcast live. At its height, the series had drawn in almost a quarter of British people who owned a television. Reportedly, Queen Elizabeth, The Queen Mother was a great fan. A film version, entitled It's a Great Day, was produced in 1955, likewise written by the Pertwees.

His final feature credit was Not Wanted on Voyage (1957).

=== Juvenile fiction ===
Pertwee also wrote works of juvenile fiction, including the series The Islanders, which serves up typical Boy's Own adventure with a strong field sports theme. The Islanders (1950) and Rough Water (1951) tell the adventures of three boys with the run of a sporting estate in the wild Devon countryside during a summer holiday. The third book, Operation Wild Goose (1955), takes place some years later, on a trip to Iceland, where the boys come up against Russian spies, in between landing fat salmon.

A further book, An Actor's Life for Me (1953), features just one of the Islanders boys, Nick, as he follows his parents onto the stage.

Pertwee wrote two short stories, "The River God" and "Fish Are Such Liars" which are now considered classics and have been anthologized in the book, Fisherman's Bounty, edited by Nick Lyons, and originally published by Crown in 1970, then by Fireside in 1988.

== Later years and death ==
Following the cancellation of The Grove Family in 1957, Pertwee retired from writing. He died in April 1963.

== Acting credits ==
=== Complete filmography ===
- Caste (1915)
- The Second Mrs Tanqueray (1916)
- Quinneys (1919)
- The Four Just Men (1939)
- Pimpernel Smith (1941) as Sir George Smith
- The Day Will Dawn (1942)
- Talk About Jacqueline (1942) (uncredited)
- The Gentle Sex (1943) (uncredited)
- The Halfway House (1944) as the Prison Governor
- They Were Sisters (1945) as Sir Hamish Nair

=== Stage ===
- SOS (1928)

== Writing credits ==
=== Screenwriter (partial listing) ===
- I Like Your Nerve (1931)
- Impromptu (1932, short)
- The Ghoul (1933)
- British Agent (1934)
- The Night of the Party (1935)
- Non-Stop New York (1937)
- King Solomon's Mines (1937)
- A Yank at Oxford (1938)
- The Ware Case (1938)
- Young Man's Fancy (1939)
- The Spy in Black (1939)
- The Proud Valley (1940)
- Return to Yesterday (1940)
- Freedom Radio (1941)
- 'Pimpernel' Smith (1941)
- Jeannie (1941)
- The Gentle Sex (1943)
- The Lamp Still Burns (1943)
- The Halfway House (1944)
- They Were Sisters (1945)
- Caravan (1946)
- Diamond City (1949)
- Black Jack (1950)

==== Plays turned into films ====
- Out to Win (1923)
- The Road to Singapore (1931)
- A Voice Said Goodnight. (1932)
- Pink String and Sealing Wax (1945)

=== Short stories ===
- A Call on the Country
- Camouflage (1917)
- Jackie Play Alone (1918)
- Delayed It May Be (1918)
- The Hero (1918)
- Why Not? (1919)
- The RedMoth (1920)
- The Little Princess (1920)
- A Silly Thing to Do (1921)
- The Man Who Didn't Matter (1922)
- Men of Affairs (1922)
- The Chap Upstairs (1922)
- The Money Spider's Web (1923)
- The eagle and the Wren (1923)
- Security (1926)
- A Trial Run (1926)
- The Common Cause (1926)
- Rodney Darling (1927)
- A Modern Knight Errant (1927)
- A Bowl of Contention (1928)
- Sentiment to the Rescue (1928)
- The Fox and the Eggs (1929)
- Empty Arms (1931)
- Damaged Sixpence (1937)
- The Governor's Lady and Judy O'Grady (1937)
- A Chalk Stream Killing (1939)
- Irene Marries Money (1939)
- Greater London (1943)
- Move Brittania (1945)
- Reflected Glory (1952)

=== Novels ===
- Transactions of Lord Louis Lewis (1917)
- The Old Card (1918)
- Our Wonderful Selves (1919)
- Out to Win (1922) – based on the play
- The Singing Wells (1923)
- A South Sea Bubble (1924) or Treasure Trail
- Rivers to Cross (1926)
- The Romance of Nikko Cheyne (1927)
- Gentlemen March (1927)
- Interference (1927) – based on his play
- Pursuit (1931)
- It Means Mischief (1931)
- A Price of Romance (1932)
- No Such Word (1934)
- Morosco (1934)
- Four Winds (1935)
- Such an Enmity (1936)
- The Camelion's Dish (1940)
- Lovers Are Losers (1941)
- The Utterly Udder (1952)

=== Plays ===
- Swank, Falling Upstairs, Vantage Out, and The Return of Imray – four short plays (1914)
- Out to Win (1921)
- I Serve (1922)
- The Loveliest Thing (1923)
- Evening Dress Indispensable (1925)
- Interference (1927) with Harold Deane
- The Odd Streak (1927)
- It Might Happen to Anyone
- The Spider (1928)
- Heat Wave (1929)
- Honours Easy (1930)
- Fly Away Birdie
- Pink String and Sealing Wax (1943)
- The Paragon with Michael Pertwee – filmed as Silent Dust
- To Kill a Cat with Harold Dearden
- Postal Orders
- School for Spinsters
- Night was Our Friend
- Ladies in Retirement with Michael Pertwee
- Bridge of Sighs
- The Cord

=== Junior fiction ===
- The Islanders (1951)
- Rough Water (1952)
- An Actor's Life for Me (1953)
- Young Harry Tremayne (1954)
- Operation Wild Goose (1955)
