= Carla Lehmann =

Canadian actress (1917–1990)

- Born: 26 February 1917; Winnipeg, Manitoba, Canada
- Died: 1 December 1990 (aged 73); Berkshire, England, United Kingdom
- Other names: Carla Hillerns Lehmann; Carla Hillerns Townsend
- Education: RADA
- Occupations: Stage actress Film actress Television actress
- Years active: 1938–1952

Carla Lehmann (26 February 1917 – 1 December 1990) was a Canadian stage, film and television actress.

== Career ==
Born in Winnipeg, Manitoba in Canada, Lehmann was the youngest of the five children of Dr Julius Lehmann and Elsa Hillerns. She was educated at Riverbend School (now Balmoral Hall), where she edited the school newspaper, and from the age of fifteen appeared at the Little Theatre, Winnipeg. Gaining a place to train for an acting career at RADA in London, she then joined the Croydon Repertory Company for a year before first appearing in the West End. Her stage work included appearances in several Aldwych farces. During the Second World War she starred in war films opposite Stewart Granger and James Mason. She also played in Cottage to Let opposite John Mills and Alistair Sim in 1941.

Lehmann notably played Susan Foster in the film Candlelight in Algeria (1944) and Lady Mary Hannay in the BBC television series The Three Hostages (1952).

== Private life ==
Lehmann spent most of her adult life living in England. In 1941 she married George Anderson McDowell Elliot, a former Royal Marine officer recently commissioned into the Royal Army Service Corps, but they later divorced. In 1947 she married her second husband, John R. Townsend, an insurance broker, in Westminster, and they had three sons, John Anthony (born 1948), Nicholas (born 1949), and Alain (1954). She died in Berkshire in 1990.

== Filmography ==
| Year | Title | Role | Notes |
|---|---|---|---|
| 1938 | Luck of the Navy | | Uncredited |
| 1939 | So This Is London | Elinor Draper | |
| 1940 | Sailors Three | Jane | |
| 1941 | Cottage to Let | Helen Barrington | |
| 1941 | Once a Crook | Estelle | |
| 1942 | Flying Fortress | Sydney Kelly | |
| 1942 | Secret Mission | Michèle de Carnot | |
| 1942 | Talk About Jacqueline | Jacqueline Marlow | |
| 1944 | Candlelight in Algeria | Susan Foster | |
| 1945 | 29 Acacia Avenue | Fay Jones | |
| 1947 | Fame Is the Spur | Lady Lettice | |
