= Honours Easy =

1935 British drama film

- Directed by: Herbert Brenon
- Written by: Roland Pertwee
- Based on: play Honours Easy by Roland Pertwee
- Produced by: Walter C. Mycroft
- Starring: Greta Nissen; Margaret Lockwood; Patric Knowles
- Cinematography: Ronald Neame
- Production company: British International Pictures
- Distributed by: Wardour Films (UK)
- Release dates: 31 July 1935 (London, England)
- Running time: 62 minutes
- Country: England
- Language: English

Honours Easy is a 1935 British drama film directed by Herbert Brenon and starring Greta Nissen, Patric Knowles and Margaret Lockwood. It was written by Roland Pertwee based on his 1930 play Honours Easy. It follows a man who tries to take revenge on a rival for a slight seventeen years before by framing his son for theft.

== Preservation status ==
The British Film Institute National Archive holds a collection of ephemera and stills but no film or video materials.

== Plot ==
Unhinged art dealer William Barton seeks revenge on a man who ruined his career years ago. He does so by attempting to frame the man's son for the theft of $2,500 from the safe in his gallery. However the son has an alibi in Barton's wife, with whom he is having an affair.

== Cast ==
- Greta Nissen as Ursula Barton
- Patric Knowles as Harry Markham
- Margaret Lockwood as Ann
- George Graves as Colonel Bagnall
- W. H. Berry as Joe Budd
- Chili Bouchier as Kate
- Robert Rendel as Sir Henry Markham
- Ivan Samson as William Barton

== Reception ==
The Monthly Film Bulletin wrote: "The motives of the characters are not altogether convincing and the story is in consequence somewhat artificial. Nevertheless it is neatly told and is kept moving at a good pace."

Kine Weekly wrote: "Neat drama of revenge, supported in its theatrical but effective interpretation by a frank sex interest. Maybe the rather machine-made plot is outside the bounds of probability, but it nevertheless has in its composition the power to invite satisfactory emotional reaction."
