= The Laughter of Fools =

1933 film directed by Adrian Brunel

- Directed by: Adrian Brunel
- Written by: H. F. Maltby (play); Adrian Brunel; Reginald Beck
- Produced by: George Smith
- Starring: D. A. Clarke-Smith; Derrick De Marney; Helen Ferrers; Eliot Makeham
- Cinematography: Eric Cross
- Edited by: Roy Lockwood
- Production company: George Smith Productions
- Distributed by: Fox
- Release date: October 1933
- Running time: 47 minutes
- Country: United Kingdom
- Language: English

The Laughter of Fools is a 1933 British drama film directed by Adrian Brunel and starring D. A. Clarke-Smith, Derrick De Marney and Helen Ferrers. It was written by Brunel and Reginald Beck based on a play by H. F. Maltby. The screenplay concerns an ambitious mother who plans to marry her daughter to a sea captain.

The film was a quota quickie made at Nettlefold Studios in Walton by the independent producer George Smith as part of a contract from Fox, who needed a supply of films to distribute in order to comply with the terms of the quota.

== Preservation status ==
The British Film Institute National Archive holds no stills or ephemera, and no film or video materials.

== Plot ==
Mrs. Gregg chooses Captain Vidal, a wealthy friend of her son Bertie, as a potential husband for her daughter Mabel. Her matrimonial plans, however, go astray when Vidal instead falls for Doris, her penniless niece. Meanwhile, Mr Gregg buys a house at an auction, leaving Mrs. Gregg and her daughter in the family flat.

== Cast ==
- D. A. Clarke-Smith as Plunket
- Derrick De Marney as Captain Vidal
- Helen Ferrers as Mrs. Gregg
- Eliot Makeham as John Gregg
- Granville Ferrier as Hughes Sr.
- Pat Paterson as Doris Henley
- Minnie Taylor as Elizabeth
- George Thirlwell as Bertie Gregg
- Dorothy Vernon as cook
- Fred Withers as Nuttall

== Reception ==
The Daily Film Renter wrote: "Marriage scheme comedy with amusing triangle element. ... Effective acting by Pat Paterson, with adequate support by remainder of cast, and an excellent portrayal by Minnie Taylor as nervous maid. Action is slow at times, but photography and settings are quite adequate."

Picturegoer wrote: "A Cinderella theme in a very slight story with obvious humour and tame romantic qualities. The dialogue is weak and tends to hold up the action and the artistes have rather a thankless task in their respective roles. There is a good deal of charm about Pat Paterson's interpretation of Doris and Eliot Makeham is 'amusing as the shy but likeable Mr. 'Gregg. The supporting characters are not too good and the entertainment generally is well below the average."
