= Meet Me at Dawn =

- Directed by: Thornton Freeland; Peter Creswell
- Written by: Marcel Achard; Maurice Cowan; James Seymour; Lesley Storm; Anatole Litvak (story)
- Produced by: Marcel Hellman
- Starring: William Eythe; Stanley Holloway; Hazel Court; Margaret Rutherford; Basil Sydney
- Cinematography: Günther Krampf
- Edited by: Edward B. Jarvis
- Music by: Mischa Spoliansky
- Production company: Marcel Hellman Productions (as Excelsior Films Ltd.)
- Distributed by: Twentieth Century Fox
- Release date: 6 January 1947 (UK)
- Running time: 99 minutes
- Country: United Kingdom
- Language: English

Meet Me at Dawn is a 1947 British romantic comedy film directed by Peter Creswell and Thornton Freeland and starring William Eythe, Stanley Holloway and Hazel Court. It was written by Marcel Achard, Maurice Cowan, James Seymour and Lesley Storm from a story by Anatole Litvak.

== Plot ==
A skilled pistol shot hires himself out to fight and duels in early twentieth century Paris.

== Cast ==
- William Eythe as Charles Morton
- Stanley Holloway as Emile Pollet
- Hazel Court as Gabrielle Vermorel
- George Thorpe as Senator Philipe Renault
- Irene Browne as Madame Renault
- Beatrice Campbell as Margot
- Basil Sydney as Georges Vermorel
- Margaret Rutherford as Madame Vernorel
- Ada Reeve as Mathilde, the concierge
- Graeme Muir as Count de Brissac
- Wilfrid Hyde-White as Garin, news editor
- John Ruddock as doctor
- O. B. Clarence as ambassador
- Aubrey Mallalieu as Prefect of Police
- James Harcourt as Henri, the butler
- Charles Victor as 1st client
- John Salew as 2nd client
- Percy Walsh as shooting gallery man
- Hy Hazell as 1st girl in restaurant
- Joan Seton as Vermorel's secretary
- Katie Johnson as Henriette, Madame Vermorel's housekeeper
- Diana Decker as 2nd girl in restaurant
- Lind Joyce as Yvonne Jadin, singer
- Guy Rolfe as ambassador's friend (uncredited)
- Charles Hawtrey as reporter at the fair (uncredited)
- Anthony Dawson as first duelling opponent (uncredited)

== Critical reception ==
The Monthly Film Bulletin wrote: "A competent band of players – headed by William Eythe as Charles Morton and Hazel Court as Gabrielle Vermorel – do their best to give life to this film, but they and the director are badly hampered by a weak script and by dialogue which at times is just trite. Stanley Holloway and Margaret Rutherford are pillars of strength as Morgan's friend Emile and Ver'mérel's mother respectively."

Kine Weekly wrote: "Gay-nineties romantic comedy, clumsily adapted from the French and set in a completely phoney Parisian atmosphere. ... About as piquant as pigs' trotters, it's unlikely to create much of a furore anywhere. ... To expect a young American actor, 21 English actors and actresses and an American director to turn out a saucy and subtle French farce is optimistic to a degree, and needless to say, the impossible is not achieved. The players try hard enough and the staging is elaborate, but atmosphere is entirely lacking. A rissole rather than a tasty tit-bit, it's a salutory hint to British studios to stick to British subjects."

The New York Times wrote that the film "is something less than choice either as comedy or romance. In truth, it is plain boring, and the fault isn't Mr. Eythe's. He is pleasant enough in all that he has to do, but the central line of the story ... is spread pretty thin ... The handful who were present at the first showing yesterday afternoon took Meet Me at Dawn without any trace of amusement.

Leslie Halliwell wrote "A totally laborious and artificial period comedy which never seems even to aspire to the style required."

In The Radio Times Guide to Films David Parkinson gave the film 2/5 stars, writing: "After making his name with Flying down to Rio, this was something of a crash-landing for American director Thornton Freeland. His understanding of the peculiarities of British humour seems to have deserted him after his wartime sojourn in Hollywood, for he misses every laughter cue (and goodness knows there are precious few) in this feeble comedy. His fellow Yank in exile, William Eythe, looks increasingly uncomfortable as this tale of duelling and duplicity develops."
