= Get Your Man (1934 film) =

1934 film

- Dorothy Boyd and Sebastian Shaw in the film.
- Directed by: George King
- Screenplay by: George Dewhurst
- Starring: Dorothy Boyd; Helen Ferrers; Sebastian Shaw
- Production company: British and Dominions Film Corporation
- Release date: 25 February 1934
- Running time: 67 minutes
- Country: United Kingdom
- Language: English

Get Your Man is a 1934 British comedy film directed by George King and starring Dorothy Boyd, Sebastian Shaw and Clifford Heatherley. It was written by George Dewhurst based on the play Tu m'epouseras by Louis Verneuil, and was made as a quota quickie.

== Preservation status ==
The British Film Institute National Archive holds a collection of stills but no film or video materials.

== Plot ==
A determined young woman sets up an elaborate plan to secure the man she has fallen in love with.

== Cast ==
- Dorothy Boyd as Nancy McAlpine
- Sebastian Shaw as Robert Halbean
- Clifford Heatherley as Parker Halbean
- Hugh E. Wright as Reverend John Vivien
- Kay Walsh as Mary Vivien
- Helen Ferrers as Agatha McAlpine
- Rex Harrison as Tom Jakes

== Reception ==
Kine Weekly wrote: "Quiet, unassuming romantic comedy ... The complications, thanks to good work on the part of the two stage veterans, Helen Ferrers and Clifford Heatherley, should amuse the unsophisticated, but the entertainment as a whole falls too short of modern snappy standards to be considered a sound general proposition. ... The artless entertainment offered here has a certain unsophisticated charm, but this alone does not quite succeed in compensating for the paucity of story material and the lack of inspiration revealed in the direction."

The Daily Film Renter wrote: "Stupid comedy-drama of wilful girl who sets out to win backward young man from rightful fiancée. Artificial story, lacking in almost every necessary dramatic quality, with players who simply appear before camera to go through motions as theatrically as possible. Picture so incredibly bad that it is impossible to take seriously, with quota rating as sole asset. Entertainment appeal – none."

Picture Show wrote: "Mildly entertaining, made so chiefly by the work of Helen Ferrers as a sarcastic aunt, and Clifford Heatherley as a pompous business magnate."
