= Jeannie (film) =

- Directed by: Harold French
- Written by: Anatole de Grunwald; Roland Pertwee; Aimée Stuart (additional dialogue)
- Based on: Jeannie (1940 play) by Aimée Stuart
- Produced by: Marcel Hellman
- Starring: Barbara Mullen; Michael Redgrave; Wilfrid Lawson; Kay Hammond
- Cinematography: Bernard Knowles
- Edited by: Edward B. Jarvis
- Music by: Mischa Spoliansky
- Production company: Tansa Productions
- Distributed by: General Film Distributors (UK); English Films (US)
- Release dates: 6 September 1941 (UK); 12 September 1943 (US)
- Running time: 101 minutes
- Country: United Kingdom
- Language: English

Jeannie (also known as Girl in Distress) is a 1941 British romantic comedy film directed by Harold French and starring Barbara Mullen, Michael Redgrave and Albert Lieven. It was written by Anatole de Grunwald, Roland Pertwee based on the 1940 play of the same name by Aimée Stuart. The film's sets were designed by Duncan Sutherland. The film was loosely remade in 1957 as Let's Be Happy.

== Plot ==
Jeannie McLean is a young Scottish woman who takes care of her tightfisted father, leaving her no time (and money) for herself. When he dies, she discovers he has left his "fortune" – £297 – to her, nothing to her married sisters. She decides to have some fun for a change, starting with a trip to Vienna.

On the way to and in Vienna, a stranger, Stanley Smith, helps her through various difficulties resulting from her inexperience. As they become acquainted, she tells him she is 26, but he soon discovers (from her passport) that she is 22.

In Vienna, Jeannie makes the acquaintance of Count Ehrlich von Wittgenstein, while Stanley gets to know a blonde model named Margaret. The next day, Stanley sets out to market his invention, a washing machine, while the count takes Jeannie on a tour of the city. She goes shopping for clothes. When Stanley sees her that night, she is completely transformed outwardly. Stanley asks her out, but she is already engaged to go to the opera with the count. Stanley takes Margaret there too. Everywhere the count takes Jeannie, Stanley arranges to be there as well, along with Margaret. Finally, the count asks Jeannie to marry him, but when he learns that she is not rich as he thought, he breaks it off. Jeannie has just money enough left to get home.

Stanley has great success selling his washing machines, but when he goes to Scotland to find Jeannie, no one knows where she is. As luck would have it, she has found work demonstrating Stanley's product. He proposes to her, and after some resistance, she gives in.

== Cast ==
- Barbara Mullen as Jeannie McLean
- Michael Redgrave as Stanley Smith
- Wilfrid Lawson as James McLean, her father
- Kay Hammond as Margaret
- Albert Lieven as Count Ehrlich von Wittgenstein
- Phyllis Stanley as Mrs. Whitelaw
- Edward Chapman as Mr. Jansen
- Marjorie Fielding as Mrs. Murdoch
- Frank Cellier
- Googie Withers as laundry girl
- Gus McNaughton as Angus Whitelaw
- Rachel Kempson as Jeannie's sister
- Esmé Percy
- Joan Kemp-Welch as Jeannie's sister
- Percy Walsh as French customs official
- Hilda Bayley as Mrs. Jansen
- Ian Fleming
- Anne Shelton
- Meinhart Maur
- Katie Johnson as Mathilda
- Joss Ambler
- Wally Patch as Porter
- Brefni O'Rorke as quarantine officer
- Max Adrian
- Phillip Godfreyas restaurant car attendant
- Lynn Evans

== Production ==
The film established Harold French as a director. He later said:

The producer, Marcel Hellman, was very generous to me and he forced me through into a major picture; I don’t think the distributors wanted me, they wanted someone well known. It made a star of Barbara Mullen, who was terribly good, though we thought she would have become a bigger star. Bernard Knowles was the cameraman; I valued his co-operation. If I got in a muddle in a crowd scene, he always knew how to move the camera. We also had Anatole de Grunwald and Roland Pertwee as the writers so we had a very well credentialed film... Jeannie was a success because Jeannie was Cinderella.

== Critical reception ==
The Monthly Film Bulletin wrote: "This pleasant lighthearted film, with deft touches both in the direction and the dialogue, is based on the play of the same name. Naturally the stage is held most of the time by Michael Redgrave as Stanley Smith, provincial, angular but of sterling worth and by Barbara Mullen as a very Scots Jeannie. With no great looks she nevertheless manages to be sympathetic and appealing all the way through. Full marks must be given to a collie-dog for its histrionic abilities and to the minor human characters, each of whom performs his allotted task with a little more than adequacy."

Kine Weekly wrote: "Gay heart-warming romantic comedy ... Glamorous backgrounds, neat directorial touches and, above all, the delightful acting of Barbara Mullen, who repeats theatrical history on the screen by making a sensational debut in the name-part, invest the Cinderella-like fundamentals with a new and greater heart interest and a happy abundance of laughs."

The New York Times wrote, "Every now and then, thank heaven, there comes to Broadway a modest and unsung little film that arouses no anticipations at all and then quietly and firmly captivates you. Jeannie, now at the Little Carnegie, is just such a film, and this corner, at least, accepts it with pleasure as that theatre's first offering of the season... For Jeannie... is as enchanting a bit of rue and nonsense as we've succumbed to in many a month...Jeannie is pure comedy of character. And what refreshing comedy it is!...Director Harold French...has staged the story with affection and understanding, Jeannie is not super-duper entertainment to knock your eye out, but it does have the gleam of real gold. As Jeannie likes to say: "My, how nice!"
