= Flying Fortress (film) =

- Theatrical release poster
- Directed by: Walter Forde
- Written by: Edward Dryhurst; Brock Williams; Gordon Wellesley
- Produced by: A. H. Saloman
- Starring: Richard Greene; Carla Lehmann; Betty Stockfeld; Donald Stewart; Sidney King
- Cinematography: Basil Emmott
- Edited by: Terence Fisher
- Music by: Jack Beaver
- Production company: Warner Bros. Pictures
- Distributed by: Warner Bros. Pictures
- Release date: 13 June 1942
- Running time: 68 minutes
- Country: United Kingdom
- Language: English
- Budget: £107,362
- Box office: $607,000 or £175,656

Flying Fortress is a 1942 British black-and-white war film drama from Warner Bros. Pictures, produced by A. H. Soloman, directed by Walter Forde, that stars Richard Greene and co-stars Carla Lehmann, Betty Stockfeld, and Donald Stewart.

During the Blitz, an arrogant American pilot becomes increasingly committed to the Allied cause after ferrying B-17 bombers from Canada to England. After joining the Royal Canadian Air Force and being assigned to an RAF squadron, he finally takes part in a Flying Fortress bombing raid on Berlin.

== Plot ==
Pilot William "Sky" Kelly (Donald Stewart) is held responsible for an aircraft crash in which a passenger is killed; however, his friend, wealthy playboy James "Jim" Spence (Richard Greene), was actually piloting the aircraft. Kelly's sister Sydney (Carla Lehmann), a newspaper reporter, vows to clear her brother and identify Spence as the actual culprit. Spence and Sydney later meet amicably, but when a scandal photographer reveals Sydney's profession, Spence suspects her motives and ends their budding relationship.

Spence reads an appeal from the RAF Ferry Command for experienced pilots to fly US Boeing B-17 Flying Fortress bombers to England. Wanting a new adventure, he flies to Canada and volunteers. After a RCAF officer berates him for his irresponsible flying, Spence changes his mind. Just before leaving, however, he learns that "Sky" Kelly is training the ferry pilots. Determined to prove himself to be as good a pilot as Kelly, Spence volunteers.

Spence makes his first flight to London with Kelly, who reveals his sister is now working there. During the long Atlantic flight the two pilots reconcile their past. After they land, Kelly and Spence hitch a ride into Blitz-ravaged London with the beautiful Lady DeBorah "Debbie" Ottershaw (Betty Stockfeld), and Kelly makes a dinner date with her. Kelly suggests that Spence come along and bring Sydney as his date; when the reluctant Spence arrives at Sydney's office, she refuses him.

DeBorah invites Kelly to her palatial home, where Kelly meets her brother, Lord "Squeakum" Ottershaw (Sidney King). The two men immediately dislike each other; Kelly assumes that Ottershaw is a malingering fop, and Ottershaw thinks Kelly is a brash, uncouth American. That evening while Sydney, Kelly, and Lady DeBorah have dinner in London, Spence sits at a nearby table until he successfully apologizes to Sydney. A German air raid abruptly spoils the rest of their evening.

Impressed by the courage of British resolve, upon returning to Canada for another B-17 ferry assignment, Spence and Kelly decide to join the Royal Canadian Air Force. Following their return flight to London, both men reunite with Sydney and Lady DeBorah. After reporting for duty, they discover Lord Ottershaw is their RAF Wing Commander. Kelly's opinion of him changes when Ottershaw announces he will be leading the Wing's bombing missions; the new commander requests both Spence and Kelly join the aircrew of his Flying Fortress.

German night fighters attack a flight of B-17s after they bomb a Berlin power station. Lord Ottershaw's bomber is hit, but an emergency repair keeps it airborne. Another fighter attack badly wounds Ottershaw and sets an engine ablaze. Making light of his injury, Ottershaw keeps the B-17 flying level while Spence, with Kelly's help, crawls out onto the wing and extinguishes the engine fire. When Kelly returns to his co-pilot station, Ottershaw collapses from his wound. The battered Flying Fortress and her surviving crew return safely to base to fight another day for England and the Allied cause.

== Cast ==
- Richard Greene as James "Jim" Spence Jr.
- Carla Lehmann as Sydney Kelly
- Betty Stockfeld as Lady DeBorah "Debbie" Ottershaw
- Donald Stewart as William "Sky" Kelly
- Basil Radford as Captain Wilkinson
- Charles Heslop as Herrington
- Sidney King as Lord "Squeakum" Ottershaw
- Edward Rigby as Dan Billings
- Joss Ambler as Sheepshead
- Robert Beatty as Connor
- Jack Watling as Rear Gunner
- William Hartnell as Parker
- John Stuart as Captain Harvey

== Production ==
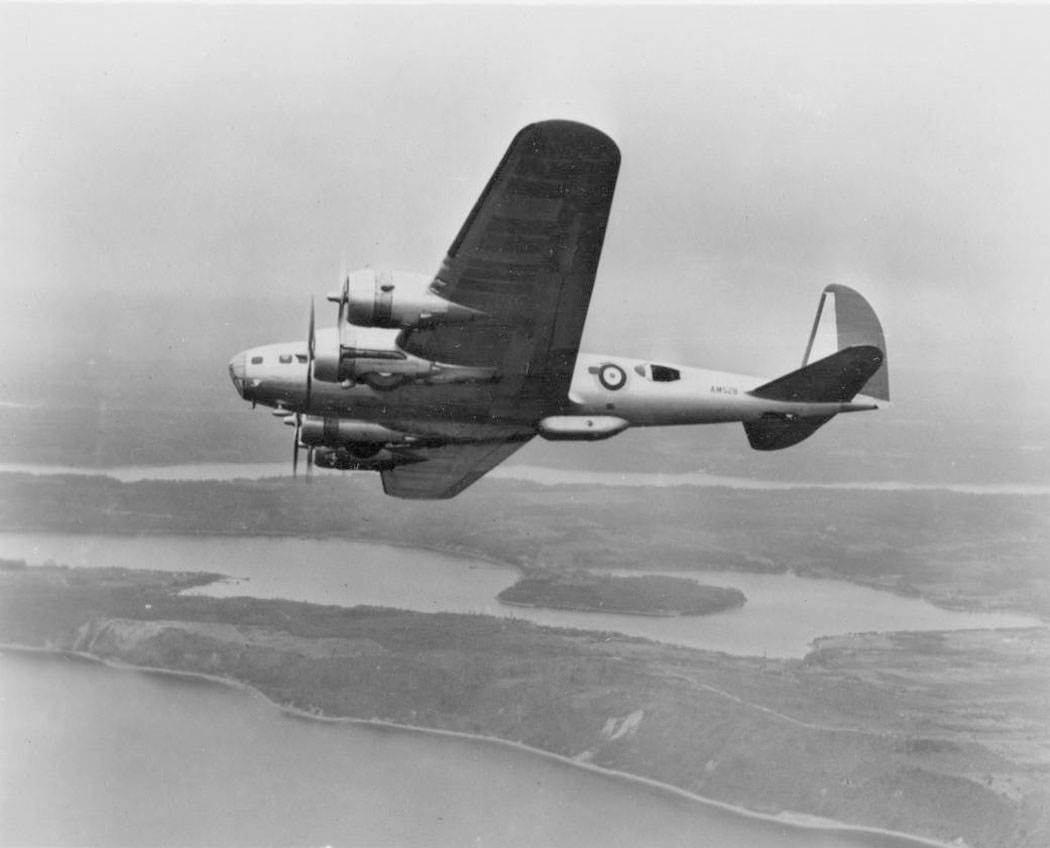
Unpainted Boeing B-17C in RAF Ferry Command livery and markings.

Flying Fortress was made in the UK at Teddington Studios by Warner Bros. Pictures' British subsidiary. Teddington, one of the few British studios to operate during the Second World War, produced Flying Fortress as part of a series of patriotic films aiding the war effort. (Note: In 1944, a V-1 flying bomb struck Teddington Studios, killing three employees and destroying buildings, but Teddington survived and remains in operation today.) Warner received co-operation from the Air Ministry, with facilities at RAF Polebrook being provided, along with a Supermarine Spitfire, Bristol Blenheim, and three early Boeing B-17Cs from No. 90 Squadron RAF, released for use in the production. A number of shooting miniatures were also created, including the Boeing bombers. (Note: In RAF service, Boeing B-17Cs were known as Fortress Is.)

These early Boeing B-17Cs were not quite ready for heavy combat, having been provided to the RAF by the US Army Air Corps. for training and patrol purposes, the result of the America's Lend-Lease Act. Lacking anything else at the time, the RAF pressed the aircraft into high-altitude daylight combat missions, with poor results. Eight of the original twenty B-17Cs were lost for a variety of reasons, before how they were utilized was changed.

The burning engine fire depicted at the conclusion of the film is based on an actual World War II incident. Sgt. James Allen Ward of the Royal New Zealand Air Force earned the Victoria Cross after he climbed onto the wing of his burning aircraft on 7 July 1941 to smother an engine fire that would have otherwise proved fatal.

Flying Fortress had its U. S. cable television premiere on Turner Classic Movies, 14 September 2007, during TCM's festival of 13 films made by Warner Brothers at Teddington Studios.

== Reception ==
Bosley Crowther reviewed Flying Fortress for The New York Times but considered the effort "sloppy". "Some of the actual glimpses of an R.A.F. field are interesting, and a few absorbing moments are achieved in the bombing raid. But even this section of the picture is a poor tracing of Target for Tonight, and the big heroic climax is just old-fashioned screen bravado". Aviation film historian James Farmer also considered the film "... poorly conceived, dated Hollywood-style bravado (that) makes for a wholly forgettable screen effort".

=== Box office ===
According to Warner Bros records, the film earned $604,000 from domestic exhibition and $300,000 from foreign exhibition for the studio.

== Home media ==
Flying Fortress is not available for viewing in any home video format, including streaming.
