= Freedom Radio =

1941 British propaganda film directed by Anthony Asquith

- DVD cover
- Directed by: Anthony Asquith
- Written by: Anatole de Grunwald; Jeffrey Dell; Basil Woon
- Story by: Roland Pertwee; Bridget Boland
- Based on: story by Louis Golding; Gordon Wellesley
- Produced by: Theo Lageard; Mario Zampi
- Starring: Clive Brook; Diana Wynyard; Raymond Huntley; Derek Farr
- Cinematography: Bernard Knowles
- Edited by: Reginald Beck
- Music by: Nicholas Brodszky
- Production company: Two Cities Films
- Distributed by: Columbia Pictures
- Release dates: 1 February 1941 (UK); 4 February 1941 (USA)
- Running time: 95 minutes
- Country: United Kingdom
- Language: English
- Budget: $248,000

Freedom Radio (a.k.a. A Voice in the Night) is a 1941 British propaganda film directed by Anthony Asquith and starring Clive Brook, Diana Wynyard, Raymond Huntley and Derek Farr. It is set in Nazi Germany in the days leading up to the Second World War and concerns an underground German resistance group who run a radio station broadcasting against the totalitarian Third Reich.

It was shot at Shepperton Studios. The film's sets were designed by the art director Paul Sheriff.

== Plot ==
The story begins in Vienna just before the beginning of the Second World War. Dr Roder is physician to some important members of the Nazi party but prefers being at his luxurious house with his wife, Irena, and servants. Irena's brother Otto returns from Italy and they throw a party with many interesting and high-ranking attendees. During the party the Gestapo call, requiring his immediate attendance.

At his club, the main servitor, Sebastian, announces the club is closing and they will not see him again. Some of Dr Roder's friends have already been taken away for 'questioning' and Dr Roder is horrified and afraid of the direction in which his country is going.

His wife Irena is an actress, and after her performance it is related that Adolf Hitler very much admired her performance. She is offered a post in Berlin as Reich Director of Popular Pageantry. At church the priest decries the deposition of a fellow priest, inciting an attack by a group of SS officers including Otto who glares at the shocked doctor. The priest is killed but the press release blames the congregation.

Hans Glaser is trying to get a radio sales licence and the doctor says he will try to help. He tells his fiancee Elly, who runs a newspaper stall despite various papers regularly being confiscated by the authorities.

Frau Schmidt is pestered by her neighbour, who frequently scrounges from her, but never pays anything back. This time she asks for lard, but Frau Schmidt refuses, as she has little enough herself. The neighbour is furious at being turned down for once; she eavesdrops and hears Frau Schmidt listening to French broadcasts, then maliciously reports her to the SS, who smash her radio and arrest her just as her granddaughter Elly arrives. An SS officer assaults the girl. She is interrogated, but after Irena learns what happened to her, she intervenes and demands that Elly's attacker be punished, and Elly cared for, and they are told that Elly will go to a "rest home".

Dr Roder and his wife start drifting apart especially when he says the Nazi party is like a cancer. She leaves him and goes to stay in Stuttgart. Things get worse, with beatings, interrogations and book burning.

The doctor asks Hans to build a secret radio. Hans first suspects a trick. The doctor explains he wants to create a "Freedom Station"... both knowing they face death if caught. They use a basement under a toy shop and smuggle parts in through toys brought for repair; they grow a network of helpers, including Fenner, an actor friend of Dr. Roder's.

Dr Roder creates a secret radio station transmitting on 26.9, from which he broadcasts condemnations of Hitler and prays for a "better" Germany to arise from the ashes of his ruined country. The unauthorised broadcast is intercepted and a public announcement made saying "do not listen to 26.9" accidentally promoting the station. They broadcast each evening at 10.30pm.

The birth of "Freedom Radio" sees the creation of an underground group of anti-Nazis who regard Karl as their leader.

Multiple people ring the doctor to wish him happy birthday... but it is not his birthday.

Captain Muller explains to his superiors how triangulation can be used to calculate where the signal is coming from. He blames Goebels for jamming the signal which then cannot be traced.

Otto visits Irena when the radio is on, they both think they recognise Dr Roder's voice. Otto is asked to join Muller's detection unit. Fenner starts doing more of the live broadcasts and the doctor's voice is put onto a gramophone record for broadcast, whilst he appears in public to prove that he is not the Voice.

His friend Rudolf has friends on each side. It is intimated to Rudolph in a coded message that Germany will invade Poland on the following Friday.

It is discovered that Hitler will be making a major broadcast from a stadium and Hans goes to rig up a bypass to allow their own message to be broadcast instead. Ironically Irena is in charge of organising the pageantry of the huge rally. She has a special seat with Rabenau. Hitler starts to speak then it jumps to Roder... he speaks for under a minute before the power is switched off. Hans is almost caught, but, with the aid of a secret supporter, gets away, dressed as an SS officer. However, he and Fenner are pursued, and Fenner sacrifices his life to ensure Hans' liberty.

They suspect Dr Roder and burst into his clinic. They find nothing. Meanwhile Hans gets home and finds Elly in his room; she looks broken, like an old woman. Unknown to Hans and the Roders, she had been sent not to a care home, but to a concentration camp.

Dr Roder's wife returns and accuses him of being a traitor. He vows to make one last broadcast. Otto appears and chats with Mrs Roder; he overheard them talking and believes she knows where her husband is going to make the broadcast from. She is taken to Ranenau's office, but tells them the wrong place. However, they work out that Dr Roder had indicated a photo in a frame as the site of the broadcast. The SS identify it as Spiedler's cottage. As Ranenau tells Irena that there will indeed be war she goes to Dr Roder to warn him that the Gestapo are coming to the cottage. But the doctor sets up the transmitter in the back of a van. Irena joins him, for the first time understanding that things are not as she had thought. The Gestapo close in and locate the van. They fire a machine gun into the van killing the doctor but not before he broadcasts their country's plan to invade Poland. As he is killed, first Irena takes over the broadcast, then, when she is killed, others in the group broadcast from elsewhere that good people were murdered that day, but that they will continue to broadcast the truth.

== Cast ==
- Clive Brook as Dr. Karl Roder
- Diana Wynyard as Irena Roder
- Raymond Huntley as Rabenau
- Derek Farr as Hans Glaser
- Joyce Howard as Elly Schmidt
- Howard Marion-Crawford as Kummer
- John Penrose as Otto
- Morland Graham as Father Landbach
- Ronald Squire as Rudolf Spiedler
- Reginald Beckwith as Fenner
- Clifford Evans as Dressler
- Bernard Miles as Captain Müller S
- Gibb McLaughlin as Dr Weiner
- Muriel George as Hanna
- Martita Hunt as Frau Lehmann, concierge
- Hay Petrie as Sebastian
- Manning Whiley as SS trooper
- Katie Johnson as Granny Schmidt
- George Hayes as policeman
- Everley Gregg as Maria Tattenheim
- Marie Ault as old woman customer
- Abraham Sofaer as Heini
- Joan Hickson as Katie
- Pat McGrath as Kurt
- Wyndham Milligan as SS guard
- Bunty Payne as Ema
- William Hartnell as radio operator

== Critical reception ==
The Monthly Film Bulletin wrote: "An excellent, well-directed film of good propaganda value. The sound recording is specially praiseworthy. In a magnificent cast, Clive Brook and Diana Wynyard give of their best as Karl and Irene and there are some cameos of acting worth remembering, for example Morland Graham as Father Landbach and Katie Johnson as Granny Schmidt."

The New York Times critic wrote that "this is a frankly propagandistic drama...The admirable emotional restraint which went into the making of several of the better British war films seen here in the past year is sadly lacking."

Sky Movies called the film, "gripping, strongly cast and more subtle than most propaganda thrillers of its time...And film buffs may spot Katie Johnson, later to win fame in The Ladykillers but here, 13 years earlier, already in granny roles!"

Wolfgang Gans zu Putlitz, German diplomat operating for British intelligence, recalls in his autobiography working on the film as a consultant at Shepperton in the winter of 1939–40.
