= Secret Mission =

- UK DVD cover
- Directed by: Harold French
- Screenplay by: Anatole de Grunwald; Basil Bartlett
- Story by: Terence Young
- Produced by: Marcel Hellman
- Starring: James Mason; Hugh Williams; Carla Lehmann; Roland Culver
- Cinematography: Bernard Knowles
- Edited by: Edward B. Jarvis
- Music by: Mischa Spoliansky
- Production company: Excelsior Films
- Distributed by: General Film Distributors (UK)
- Release dates: 5 October 1942 (UK); 1945 (France)
- Running time: 94 min.
- Country: United Kingdom
- Language: English
- Box office: 1,759,641 admissions (France)

Secret Mission is a 1942 British war film directed by Harold French and starring Hugh Williams, James Mason, Nancy Price, Carla Lehmann and Roland Culver. It was written by Anatole de Grunwald and Basil Bartlett from a story by Terence Young.

== Plot ==
British Army Major Peter Garnett assembles a team consisting of Captain ‘Red’ Gowan, Private ‘Nobby’ Clark and Raoul de Carnot, a member of the Free French forces, during the Second World War. Their mission is to collect intelligence on German military strength in the coastal area of occupied France. Sub-Lieutenant Jackson watches as their dinghy crosses the English Channel and remarks that he does not envy them their jobs.

Nobby knows the target area well: He used to live in Saint Antoine, where he ran a café with his French wife, Lulu. After killing a sentry once ashore, they set a time and place for a rendezvous in two days with the code for bringing the aircraft. They split up, Gowan and Nobby to the village, Raoul and Garnett to the chateau that is Raoul's ancestral home where Lulu, Nobby's wife, welcomes them.

Raoul and Garnett are welcomed, more or less, by Raoul's sister Michele. Their brother is a prisoner. She wants Raoul to stay and help to manage the land. She is resigned to cooperating with the occupiers, and is too frightened to assist in the mission.

They contact a local businessman, M. Fayolle, now hated by most of the townspeople for his open collaboration with the occupying forces, but in fact secretly working with the French Resistance. He and his daughter Estelle have helped 100 Allied servicemen to escape. He provides them with special papers.

At German headquarters, Garnett and Gowan masquerade as champagne salesmen, aided by a personal letter from von Ribbentrop and champagne supplied by Nobby. Having thus established their bona fides, they do deals with German officers for supplying their messes. They are able to photograph a map showing troop disposition, and also extract a great deal of information from the unwary Nazis, who suspect them of being either Gestapo or counter espionage. Annoyed, General von Reichman puts in a call to Berlin.

The agents locate a secret aerodrome, built into a cliffside so that it cannot be bombed. A patrol hears them in the woods, fires into the trees, and Raoul is shot. He dies at home, with Michele and the priest beside him. Angry and heartbroken, Michele tells them to leave,

Raoul died without showing them the important rendezvous point, an ancient tree where he and Michele played as children. They must return to ask Michele where it is. She refuses to help. M. Fayolle and his daughter, Estelle, arrive to speak to Raoul, revealing their role in the Resistance to Michele, risking their lives. They are distressed to learn of Raoul's death; they are here to warn the others that the woods will be heavily patrolled. Reichman has learned that von Ribbentrop never heard of them and has launched a manhunt. Michele goes to warn them and show them the tree, but a patrol captures them. At the tree, Private Clark shows up in the armored propaganda truck (nicknamed the “Music Box”) which he has just hijacked. Garnett and Clark change into Nazi uniforms and head to Nazi headquarters, where he gives the Medical Officer instructions to release a prisoner, Captain MacKenzie, to them. He does so, but becomes suspicious.

At 10 past three a.m., at first light, they signal a squadron of planes carrying paratroopers, who land and overrun the factory and blow it up.

They all rendezvous at the beach. Michele and Garnett have fallen in love. As the others embark by boat to return to England, Michele refuses his offer to take her with them and promises to start working with the Resistance. She gives him the little cross she wears around her neck and they kiss. “Goodbye Michele.” “Au revoir, Peter.” She turns and walks away, slowly at first, then with confidence and purpose.

== Cast ==
- Hugh Williams as Major Peter Garnett
- James Mason as Raoul de Carnot
- Carla Lehmann as Michele de Carnot
- Roland Culver as Captain 'Red' Gowan
- Michael Wilding as Private 'Nobby' Clark
- Nancy Price as Violette, housekeeper
- Karel Stepanek as Major Lang
- Fritz Wendhausen as General von Reichman (as F.R. Wendhausen)
- Betty Warren as Lulu Clark
- Percy Walsh as M. Fayolle
- Anita Gombault as Estelle Fayolle
- Nicholas Stuart as Captain Mackenzie
- John Salew as Hauptmann Gruening
- Yvonne Andre as Martine, money collector
- David Page as Rene de Carnot, boy
- Brefni O'Rorke as village priest
- Beatrice Varley as British cook
- Stewart Granger as Sub-Lieutenant Jackson
- Oscar Ebelsbacher as Provost Officer
- Herbert Lom as Medical Officer

== Critical reception ==
The Monthly Film Bulletin wrote: "This story should have made a film full of excitement and suspense. Instead, it lacks pace in direction, and in some important cases sincerity in acting. The Germans are convincing and there are good performances from Michael Wilding as Nobby Clark, Betty Warren as his French wife, James Mason as Raoul and Nancy Price as Violette, Raoul's old nurse. What success the film achieves is in no small measure due to the clever music by Mischa Spoliansky, whose musical sense of humour is as strong as his sense of drama."

Variety wrote: "Occupied France as a land over-flowing, if not with milk and honey at least with plenty of good cognac and vintage champagnes not to mention ample supplies of coffee and food, is one of the several surprises Secret Mission has to offer. It's satisfying fare for war-minded audiences. ... Production value, especially in a massive underground fortress, demolition of which by bombing is the highlight of the picture, is considerably above average. Direction generally is competent."

Leonard Maltin described it as a "Stiff-upper-lip WW2 drama" that is "Well paced dramatically," but whose "comical touches seem awkwardly out of place."

The Radio Times wrote: "It's hard to see how this flag-waver could have raised anyone's spirits during the darkest days of the Second World War. There's a modicum of excitement in the attempt by Michael Wilding, Hugh Williams and Roland Culver, along with their French guide James Mason, to glean information about Nazi invasion plans. But the comic subplot involving Wilding and his French wife, and the romance that develops between Williams and Mason's sister (Carla Lehmann), are embarrassingly twee. Credit to director Harold French for keeping the pace brisk, but this is unremarkable fare."
