= "Pimpernel" Smith =

1941 anti-Nazi thriller movie directed by Leslie Howard

- Original theatrical poster
- Directed by: Leslie Howard
- Written by: A. G. Macdonell
- Screenplay by: Anatole de Grunwald; Ian Dalrymple (uncredited)
- Story by: A. G. Macdonell; Wolfgang Wilhelm
- Based on: "'Pimpernel' Smith" (story) by: A. G. Macdonell The Scarlet Pimpernel (novel); Baroness Emmuska Orczy
- Produced by: Leslie Howard; Harold Huth (associate)
- Starring: Leslie Howard; Francis L. Sullivan; Mary Morris
- Cinematography: Mutz Greenbaum
- Edited by: Sidney Cole; Douglas Myers
- Music by: John Greenwood
- Production company: British National Films
- Distributed by: Anglo-American Film Corporation (UK)
- Release date: 26 July 1941 (UK)
- Running time: 120 minutes
- Country: United Kingdom
- Language: English

"Pimpernel" Smith (released in the US as Mister V) is a 1941 British anti-Nazi thriller, produced and directed by its star Leslie Howard, which updates his role in The Scarlet Pimpernel (1934) from Revolutionary France to pre-Second World War Europe. The British Film Yearbook for 1945 described his work as "one of the most valuable facets of British propaganda".

The film helped to inspire the Swedish diplomat Raoul Wallenberg to lead a real-life rescue operation in Budapest that saved tens of thousands of Hungarian Jews from Nazi concentration camps during the last months of the Second World War.

It is one of the most prestigious movies made by British National Pictures.

== Plot ==
In the spring of 1939, months before the outbreak of the war, eccentric Cambridge archaeologist Horatio Smith takes a group of British and American archaeology students to Nazi Germany during the Long Vacation to help in his excavations. His research is supported by the Nazis because he professes to be looking for evidence of the Aryan origins of German civilisation.

However, he has a secret agenda: to free prisoners of the Nazis, including inmates of the concentration camps. During one such daring rescue, he hides disguised as a scarecrow in a field and is inadvertently shot in the arm by a German soldier idly engaging in a bit of target practice to frighten the prisoners digging in the field. He still manages to free a celebrated pianist from the work gang. Later, his students guess his secret when they notice his injury and connect it to a newspaper story about the wounding of the latter-day Scarlet Pimpernel. They enthusiastically volunteer to assist him.

German Gestapo General von Graum is determined to find out the identity of the "Pimpernel" and eliminate him. Von Graum forces Ludmilla Koslowski to help him by threatening the life of her father, a leading Polish democrat held prisoner by the Nazis. When Smith finds out, he promises her he will free Koslowski.

With Smith masquerading as a well-connected official responsible for creating the German-American Bund and his students pretending to be American journalists, they visit the camp in which Koslowski is being held. They knock out their escort and strip them and themselves of their clothes. Koslowski and four other prisoners put on the uniforms and suits and escape with Smith. The students pretend to be unconscious when they are discovered during rounds. They threaten the camp authorities with horrible publicity in the American press.

By now, von Graum is sure Smith is the man he is after, so he stops the train transporting the professor, the students and various packing crates out of the country. The professor has mysteriously disappeared from the train. When von Graum has the crates opened, he is disappointed to find only ancient artefacts from Smith's excavations. The students slip across the border by joining a Cook's Tour group.

Smith comes back for Ludmilla. They flee on a train, but are caught at a border crossing by von Graum's men. Ludmilla, despite wanting to stay with Smith, is ordered to reboard the train. Von Graum gloats over Smith's capture and reveals that the invasion of Poland has begun that very night. He allows Smith to stand outside next to the border gate, ordering his men to leave them alone, hoping to shoot him "while trying to escape". Smith draws von Graum's attention to an artefact inadvertently left behind on the platform. Von Graum picks it up, then smashes it on the ground when Smith says it proves that there was no early Aryan civilization; the sound brings von Graum's men. When he turns toward them and orders them back, Smith vanishes across the border into the foggy night. Von Graum futilely shouts, "Come back!" Smith replies, "Don't worry. I shall be back. We shall all be back."

== Cast ==
- Leslie Howard as Professor Horatio Smith (Note: Professor Smith is also addressed as "Horace" Smith in the film.)
- Francis Sullivan as General von Graum
- Mary Morris as Ludmilla Koslowski
- Hugh McDermott as David Maxwell
- Raymond Huntley as Marx
- Manning Whiley as Bertie Gregson
- Peter Gawthorne as Sidimir Koslowski
- Allan Jeayes as Dr. Benckendorf
- Dennis Arundell as Hoffman
- Joan Kemp-Welch as School-teacher
- Philip Friend as Spencer
- Laurence Kitchin as Clarence Elstead
- David Tomlinson as Steve
- Basil Appleby as Jock MacIntyre
- Percy Walsh as Dvorak
- Roland Pertwee as Embassy Official-Sir George Smith
- A. E. Matthews as Earl of Meadowbrook
- Aubrey Mallalieu as Dean
- Ben Williams as Graubitz
- Ernest Butcher as Weber
- Arthur Hambling as Jordan
- Mary Brown as Girl Student
- W. Phillips as Innkeeper
- Ilse Bard as Gretchen
- Ernest Verne as German Officer
- George Street as Schmidt
- Hector Abbas as Karl Meyer
- Neal Arden as Second Prisoner
- Richard George as Prison Guard
- Roddy Hughes as Zigor
- Hwfa (Hugh) Pryce as Wagner
- Oriel Ross as Lady Willoughby
- Brian (Bryan) Herbert as Jaromir
- Suzanne Claire (aka Violette Cunnington) as Salesgirl
- Charles Paton as Steinhof
- Michael Rennie as Guard Captain (uncredited)
- Ronald Howard (uncredited)

== Production ==
=== Development ===
Leslie Howard had been aware of the Nazis in Europe and had developed a film treatment in 1938 based on the rescue of an Austrian anti-Nazi leader. The A. G. Macdonell story of "Pimpernel" Smith took the novel The Scarlet Pimpernel by Baroness Emmuska Orczy into modern times.

Having played the leading role in the film The Scarlet Pimpernel (1934), Howard took on the updated project as the first film he directed and co-produced. (Note: Howard also directed and co-produced The First of the Few (known in the U.S. as Spitfire) (1942).)

Howard formed his own company to make the movie and raised finance through British National. It was called "British National's most ambitious production to date."

In September 1940 Howard tried to get permission from Sam Goldwyn to use David Niven in the lead.

=== Shooting ===
Production on "Pimpernel" Smith began in early 1941.

Filming finished in early March.

Throughout the film, Smith remains a shadowy figure, literally as well as figuratively. His face is often partially or completely concealed by books or lighting. His speech to von Graum pronouncing the Nazis' doom is delivered with most of it in shadow. The audience is rarely shown how Smith accomplishes his rescues. We have no idea how he extracted himself from the scarecrow. Meaningful glances from characters like the Cook's Tour guide and the innkeeper who reminds him of the time suggest that like the original Pimpernel, he has an unknown number of helpers. We are shown the secret behind his disappearance with Ludmilla when they emerge from the closet after the Nazis pursue them down the fire escape. "Almost ashamed to use that old trick," he says "but it nearly always works".

There is an incident during the Embassy reception that may provide a clue to Smith's history and motivation. It occurs at the 43-minute mark. Smith wears three medals on the lapel of his ancient evening clothes. He asks the Embassy man who is taking the invitation cards for a light for his cigarette, and while the man is getting a match, Smith tears corners off some invitations and pockets his own. The man returns and lights Smith's cigarette. "Old Soldiers", Smith says, pointing to the man's medals and to his own. "Yes sir!" the man replies, acknowledging a shared military experience and suggesting that Smith served during The Great War and witnessed its horrors. Near the end of the film, while he and Ludmilla are riding toward freedom. he quotes Rupert Brooke, one of the poets who became symbols of the Lost Generation. The quote is not from one of Brooke's war sonnets, but from The Old Vicarage, Grantchester, written in 1912.

The film marked the screen debut of David Tomlinson. He said Howard tried to seduce Mary Morris during the making of the film, regarding the fact she was gay as "a challenge to be overcome" but she rebuffed him.

Sidney Cole the editor recalled, "Howard had great style as an actor which came over in the way he directed; but he safeguarded himself by asking me (as supervising editor) to be on the studio floor all the time during shooting so that he could ask me questions or I could tell him if I thought I needed another shot. I found when I was editing it that Leslie's style - as an actor and as a director - more or less dictated the way I edited it."

== Release ==
The film was released in the UK on 26 July 1941. The Blitz had ended just 10 weeks before, on 11 May, and the British were suffering greatly. The film ends on 31 August 1939, the eve of the joint attack on the Republic of Poland by Nazi Germany, the Slovak Republic, and the Soviet Union.

The film was sold to United Artists in the US in what was called "the most satisfactory deal ever recorded in the long story of British films and their efforts to enter the transatlantic market."

== Reception ==
=== Critical ===
Variety wrote "Leslie Howard’s triple-threat meller skids but once from the well-oiled track of the time-tried in picture making... picture has a distinct propaganda coating. But the sermon can be cut —there’s plenty of room in the footage... it’s topline entertainment."

Released in the United States as Mister V, the film review in The New York Times noted: "It is all absurd derring-do, of course, and it follows a routine pattern. It lacks the headlong course of the top-notch British thrillers. But "Mister V" becomes a tense excursion because of Mr. Howard's casual direction, and even more because of the consummate ease and the quiet irony of his performance."

During the Second World War, films shown at Chequers were the only recreational activity available to Winston Churchill, who felt that "the cinema is a wonderful form of entertainment, and takes the mind away from other things". "Pimpernel" Smith was the film which he chose to be shown in the wardroom of the battleship HMS Prince of Wales on 9 August 1941 to share with the ship's officers, as he travelled across the Atlantic for a secret conference with US President Franklin D. Roosevelt at Argentia in Newfoundland.

=== Box office ===
According to Kinematograph Weekly it was the third most popular film of 1941 in Britain, after 49th Parallel and The Great Dictator.

== Inspiration for Raoul Wallenberg ==
When "Pimpernel" Smith reached Sweden in November 1943, the Swedish Film Censorship Board decided to ban it from public viewing, as it was feared that such a critical portrayal of Nazi Germany could harm Sweden's relationship with Germany and thus jeopardise the country's neutrality in the Second World War. Raoul Wallenberg did, however, manage to see it at a private screening at the British Embassy in Stockholm, together with his half-sister, Nina Lagergren.

She later recalled that on their way home after the screening, "he told me this was the kind of thing he would like to do". Since 1941, Wallenberg had made frequent trips to Hungary, and knew how oppressed the Hungarian Jews were. He travelled as a representative and later joint owner of an export-import company that was trading with central Europe and was owned by a Hungarian Jew.

Following the mass deportations that had started in April 1944, Wallenberg was sent to Budapest in August 1944, as First Secretary to the Swedish legation, assigned under secret agreement between the US and Swedish governments to organise a rescue programme for the Jews. By issuing fake "protective passports" which identified the bearers as Swedish, he and others working with him managed to rescue tens of thousands from being sent to German death camps. He rented 32 buildings and declared them to be Swedish territory; eventually, almost 10,000 people were sheltered there.

In May 1945, "Pimpernel" Smith was released in Sweden without any age restrictions.

== Aftermath ==
This film may have been one of the reasons why Leslie Howard was killed in 1943. The airliner in which he was travelling from Portugal to London on 1 June 1943 was shot down by the Luftwaffe. Others suggest it was a case of mistaken identity, and that German agents believed Howard and his theatrical agent and traveling companion, Arthur Chenhall, were Winston Churchill and Churchill's bodyguard, to whom they allegedly bore a resemblance.

== See also ==
- List of films in the public domain in the United States
