= Marcel Hellman =

British film producer

- Born: 31 May 1898; Bucharest, Kingdom of Romania
- Died: 28 April 1986 (aged 87); United Kingdom
- Occupation: producer
- Years active: 1928–1965

Marcel Hellman (31 May 1898 – 28 April 1986) was a Romanian-born British film producer, who worked closely with Douglas Fairbanks Jr. and Harold French.

In 1936 he founded Criterion Film Productions together with Douglas Fairbanks Jr., which produced four films with Fairbanks in the lead, and in 1942 he started a production company known as Excelsior Films Ltd, which in the late 1950s changed name to Marcel Hellman Productions.

== Selected filmography ==
- The Secret Courier (1928)
- The Last Fort (1928)
- Father and Son (1929)
- The Green Monocle (1929)
- Everybody Wins (1930)
- The Son of the White Mountain (1930)
- Headfirst into Happiness (1931)
- Mélo (1932)
- Dreaming Lips (1932)
- The Marathon Runner (1933)
- The Amateur Gentleman (1936)
- Accused (1936)
- Crime Over London (1936)
- Jump for Glory (1937)
- Jeannie (1941)
- Secret Mission (1942)
- Talk About Jacqueline (1942)
- They Met in the Dark (1943)
- A Voice in the Night (1946)
- Meet Me at Dawn (1947)
- This Was a Woman (1948)
- Happy Go Lovely (1951)
- Duel in the Jungle (1954)
- Let's Be Happy (1957)
- North West Frontier (1959)
- The Amorous Adventures of Moll Flanders (1965)
