= Katie Johnson (English actress) =

English actress (1878–1957)

- Publicity still for The Ladykillers (1955)
- Born: Bessie Kate Johnson; 18 November 1878; Clayton, Sussex, England
- Died: 4 May 1957 (aged 78); Elham, Kent, England
- Occupation: Actress
- Years active: 1894−1957
- Spouse: Frank Goodenough Bayly (m. 1908; died 1923)
- Children: 2
- Awards: Best British Actress; 1955 The Ladykillers

Bessie Kate Johnson (18 November 1878 – 4 May 1957) was an English actress who appeared on stage from 1894 and on screen from the 1930s to the 1950s. She is perhaps best remembered for her BAFTA award-winning performance in The Ladykillers (1955).

== Biography ==
In 1908 she married the actor Frank Goodenough Bayly. The couple had two children.

Katie Johnson’s stage career included memorable performances such as Little Lord Fauntleroy at the Prince’s Theatre in Bristol and her role as Lady McClean in “Escape Me Never” at the Apollo in London in 1933, which she later reprised on Broadway in 1935. She also appeared in 'The Rescue Party' at the Comedy Theatre, London in 1926. For much of her career, well into her seventies, she played mostly minor roles.

She first appeared in a film at age 53, in 1932, but never received critical acclaim for her performances until 1955, when she starred, aged 76, in the Ealing Studios comedy The Ladykillers as Mrs Louisa Wilberforce. The role earned her a British Film Academy award for best British actress. She subsequently played the intriguing role of Aunt Alice, an eavesdropping amateur detective, in “How to Murder a Rich Uncle” (1957). This remained her final performance as she died at the age of 78. Other performances include the BBC science fiction serial The Quatermass Experiment (1953) and the role of a spy in I See a Dark Stranger (1946).

== Selected filmography ==
- After Office Hours (1932) – Miss Wilesden
- A Glimpse of Paradise (1934) – Mrs. Fielding
- Laburnum Grove (1936) – Mrs. Radfern
- Dusty Ermine (1936) – Emily Kent
- Farewell Again (1937) – Mother of soldier in hospital (uncredited)
- The Last Adventurers (1937) – (uncredited)
- Sunset in Vienna (1937) – Woman in Café (uncredited)
- The Dark Stairway (1938) – (uncredited)
- Marigold (1938) – Santa Dunlop
- Gaslight (1940) – Alice Barlow's Maid (uncredited)
- Two for Danger (1940) – (uncredited)
- Freedom Radio (1941) – Granny Schmidt
- Jeannie (1941) – Mathilda
- The Black Sheep of Whitehall (1942) – Train Passenger (uncredited)
- Talk About Jacqueline (1942) – Ethel
- Tawny Pipit (1944) – Miss Pyman
- He Snoops to Conquer (1944) – Ma – George's Landlady (uncredited)
- Love Letters (1945) – Nurse (uncredited)
- The Years Between (1946) – Old Man's Wife
- I See a Dark Stranger (1946) – Old Lady on Train
- Meet Me at Dawn (1947) – Henriette – Mme. Vermomel's Housekeeper
- Code of Scotland Yard (1947) – Music Box Seller. (uncredited)
- Death of an Angel (1952) – Sarah Oddy
- I Believe in You (1952) – Miss Mackiln
- Lady in the Fog (1952) – 'Mary Stuart' – Old Inmate at Murder Scene
- The Large Rope (1953) – Grandmother
- Three Steps in the Dark (1953) – Mrs. Riddle
- The Rainbow Jacket (1954) – (uncredited)
- The Delavine Affair (1954) – Mrs. Bissett
- Out of the Clouds (1955) – Passenger (uncredited)
- John and Julie (1955) – Old Lady
- The Ladykillers (1955) – Mrs. Wilberforce (The Old Lady)
- How to Murder a Rich Uncle (1957) – Alice (final film role) – (released posthumously, in June 1957)

== Additional sources ==
- Film academy awards, The Times, 13 February 1956, pg. 5
- Obituary, The Times, 9 May 1957, pg. 12
- Will, The Times, 29 July 1957, pg. 10
