= Harold French =

English director, screenwriter and actor (1897–1997)

- Born: 23 April 1897; London, England
- Died: 19 October 1997 (aged 100); London, England
- Occupations: Actor; Film director
- Years active: 1920–1936 (actor); 1937–1963 (director)
- Spouse(s): Phyllis Arnold (? – 1941); Mary Parker (predeceased him)
- Awards: Locarno International Film Festival; Most Entertaining Film; 1949 Adam and Evelyne

Harold French (23 April 1897 – 19 October 1997) was an English film director, screenwriter and actor.

== Biography ==
After training at the Italia Conti School, he made his acting debut age 12, in a production of The Winter's Tale. As an actor, most of his roles occurred between 1912 and 1936, not gaining as much attention as later he would as a director.

He worked as a screenwriter on three of the four films produced by Marcel Hellman's and Douglas Fairbanks Jr.'s production company Criterion Film Productions in the late 1930s, before switching to film direction in 1937, often with Marcel Hellman as producer. From 1940 to 1955, he had several box-office successes as director. This successful period was clouded by the 1941 death of his wife Phyllis in a Luftwaffe bombing raid.

Although he did some television work after 1955, he appears to have retired from directing and acting after 1963. He directed the hit West End play Out of Bounds starring Michael Redgrave in 1962. He died in 1997 at the age of 100.

He was a subject of the television programme This Is Your Life in May 1970 when he was surprised by Eamonn Andrews.

== Selected filmography ==
=== Director ===
- Dead Men are Dangerous (1939)
- The House of the Arrow (1940)
- The Day Will Dawn (1940)
- Jeannie (1941)
- Secret Mission (1942)
- Unpublished Story (1942)
- Talk About Jacqueline (1942)
- Dear Octopus (1943)
- English Without Tears (1944)
- Quiet Weekend (1946)
- Quartet (1948, with Ken Annakin, Arthur Crabtree and Ralph Smart)
- Adam and Evelyne (1949)
- Trio (1950, with Ken Annakin and Pat Jackson)
- Encore (1951, with Anthony Pelissier)
- The Man Who Watched Trains Go By (1952)
- The Hour of 13 (1952)
- Isn't Life Wonderful! (1953)
- Rob Roy: The Highland Rogue (1953)
- Forbidden Cargo (1954)
- The Man Who Loved Redheads (1955)

=== Actor ===
- Sister Brown (1921)
- Jealousy (1931)
- East Lynne on the Western Front (1931)
- The Officers' Mess (1931)
- A Tight Corner (1932)
- The Call Box Mystery (1932)
- A Safe Proposition (1932)
- I Adore You (1933)
- Night of the Garter (1933)
- The Umbrella (1933)
- Yes, Madam (1933)
- The Diplomatic Lover (1934)
- Murder at the Inn (1934)
- Faces (1934)
- Two on a Doorstep (1936)

=== Screenwriter ===
- Accused (1936)
- Crime Over London (1936)
- Jump for Glory (1937)
