= Help Yourself (film) =

1932 film

- Benita Hume and Martin Walker in the film
- Directed by: Jean Daumery
- Written by: John Hastings Turner; Roland Pertwee
- Based on: Sinners All by Jerome Kingston
- Produced by: Irving Asher
- Starring: Benita Hume; Martin Walker; D. A. Clarke-Smith
- Cinematography: Charles Van Enger
- Production company: Warner Brothers-First National Productions
- Distributed by: Warner Brothers Pictures
- Release date: 21 March 1932
- Running time: 74 minutes
- Country: United Kingdom
- Language: English

Help Yourself is a lost 1932 British comedy film directed by Jean Daumery and starring Benita Hume, Martin Walker and D. A. Clarke-Smith. It was written by John Hastings Turner and Roland Pertwee based on the novel Sinners All by Jerome Kingston. It was produced at Teddington Studios in London by the British subsidiary of Warner Brothers.

== Preservation status ==
The British Film Institute has classed Help Yourself as a lost film. Its National Archive holds a collection of stills but no film or video materials.

== Plot ==
While his aunt is away on the Riviera, bright young thing George Quinnock holds a Christmas open house party at his family castle. When some guests turn out to be crooks, after the Quinnock rubies, George and his friends go after the villains.

== Cast ==
- Benita Hume as Mary Lamb
- Martin Walker as George Quinnock
- D. A. Clarke-Smith as Major Fred Harris
- Kenneth Kove as Peter Ball
- Clifford Heatherley as Fox-Cardington
- Hay Petrie as Sam Short
- Helen Ferrers as Lady Hermione Quinnock
- Marie Wright as Sparrow
- Hal Gordon as Bobby Vane

== Reception ==
Film Weekly wrote: "Indulgent people may find it fairly amusing."

Kine Weekly wrote: "An agreeable mixture of crime and comedy, which provides quite good fun. The characters are well varied and amuse, while the dialogue is decorated with many bright lines. ... Martin Walker is an easy hero, Benita Hume is good as the girl, while the supporting types are played with a good sense of comedy and character. ... The somewhat commonplace story gains fresh interest by being treated in a light vein, and additional strength results from clever characterisation. The dialogue, too, is bright, but there are times when it impedes the action. However, a fair sense of balance is preserved, and the picture as a whole represents diverting light fare of second-feature calibre."

The Daily Film Renter wrote: "Amusing comedy with an idea which is a good twist of the familiar strange house-party-and-crooks theme. Interest droops here and there in otherwise strong piece, but, as it is, should go over with most popular hall patrons. ... Martin Walker gives an amusing, if slightly monotonous, study of the sem-inebriated George; Benita Hume is well suited to the role of Mary; and D. A. Clarke Smith is forceful as the 'Major' – the brains of the crook gang. Kenneth Kove is spread admirably over a 'damp string' role, and capable shows are given by Clifford Heatherley, D. Hay Petrie, Carol Coombe, Helen Ferrers, and O. B. Clarence."

Picturegoer wrote: "It is a light, frothy entertainment which is conventional in plot. The dialogue is apt to be considered of too much importance and at times impedes the action considerably. It is acceptable, but far from brilliant entertainment, and may be relied upon to pass an hour, if not riotously, at least pleasantly."

Picture Show wrote: "The cast do sterling work, the dialogue is polished and witty, and the direction resourceful."
