= Martin Walker (actor) =

British actor (1901–1955)

- Born: 27 July 1901; Harrow, London; United Kingdom
- Died: 18 September 1955 (aged 54)
- Occupation: Actor
- Years active: 1922-1954

Martin Walker (27 July 1901 – 18 September 1955) was a British stage and screen actor. He appeared in films for over thirty years from 1922 onwards, mainly in supporting roles and occasionally as a lead, such as in Help Yourself (1932).

The actor also wrote and directed a short film, Hide and Seek, in 1922. He made his final film appearance in The Belles of St. Trinian's in 1954.

== Selected filmography ==
- A Bill of Divorcement (1922)
- The Flying Fool (1931)
- Help Yourself (1932)
- Mimi (1935)
- Lieut. Daring R.N. (1935)
- Sanders of the River (1935)
- The Drum (1938)
- Murder in Soho (1939)
- Hell's Cargo (1939)
- Love on the Dole (1941)
- This England (1941)
- The Night Invader (1943)
- Lisbon Story (1946)
- The Woman in the Hall (1947)
- Black 13 (1953)
- The Belles of St. Trinian's (1954)
- Strange Experiences (1956)

== Bibliography ==
- Low, Rachael. Filmmaking in 1930s Britain. George Allen & Unwin, 1985.
- Sutton, David R. A Chorus of Raspberries: British Film Comedy 1929-1939. University of Exeter Press, 2000.
