= Candlelight in Algeria =

1944 British film by George King

- Original UK quad format poster
- Directed by: George King
- Screenplay by: Katherine Strueby; Brock Williams
- Story by: Dorothy Hope
- Produced by: George King; John Stafford
- Starring: James Mason; Carla Lehmann; Raymond Lovell; Enid Stamp Taylor
- Cinematography: Otto Heller
- Edited by: Winifred Cooper; Terence Fisher
- Music by: Roy Douglas; James Turner; Jack Beaver
- Production company: British Aviation Pictures
- Distributed by: British Lion Film Corporation (United Kingdom); 20th Century Fox (United States)
- Release dates: 20 March 1944 (UK); 30 July 1944 (USA)
- Running time: 85 minutes
- Country: United Kingdom
- Languages: English, French, German

Candlelight in Algeria is a 1944 British war film directed by George King and starring James Mason, Carla Lehmann and Raymond Lovell. The story is loosely based on an October 1942 secret conference in Cherchell, Algeria between American general Mark W. Clark and a group of high-ranking Vichy French commanders. At the conference, the Vichy French commanders agreed to not resist the Operation Torch landings in Vichy France-controlled French North Africa that occurred one month later.

== Plot ==
In 1943, before the Allied invasion of North Africa, Algiers is under the control of the Vichy government and the headquarters of the German Armistice Commission. General Mark Clark's secret mission is vital in enabling a conference among the British, American, and French, paving the way for military landings critical to Allied victory without heavier loss of lives.

As the Allies celebrate a victory, Susan Foster, suffering from a concussion sustained in the bombing, awakens in a hospital and is concerned for the fate of Alan Thurston, who she fears dead. Asking a nurse about her whereabouts and being informed of the victory, she claims that Thurston bears great credit for enabling the victory and recounts how Thurston involved her in his mission.

In flashback, ahead of the conference, British agent Alan Thurston has been assigned to travel to Algiers to recover a camera containing photos that reveal where the meeting will take place. Thurston is not aware of the meeting or the content of the photos, but he has orders to prevent the camera from reaching the Germans. He is shadowed by German spy Dr. Müller, who intends to steal the camera as soon as Thurston acquires it.

Thurston is arrested by the Vichy French and held captive by the Germans in a fort but escapes. Pursued by the Germans, he takes refuge in the house in which Susan Foster, an American sculptor living in Biskra, is staying. Thinking the intruder a burglar, Susan holds him at gunpoint until Thurston explains his situation to her and appeals for her help as a patriot. As the Vichy agents search for their escapee, Susan hides Thurston in a secret cellar to elude a search of the property. Dr. Müller finds traces of Thurston's presence in fresh condensation on a glass of milk and a cigarette without any trace of lipstick and warns Susan against getting involved in politics. Susan assures him that she is leaving the next day for Algiers on passage back to the America. After the searchers leave, Thurston warns Susan that Müller will keep her under surveillance but asks her to help in retrieving the camera hidden by a deceased agent in a bureau at the home of the agent's lover, the nightclub singer Maritza, who is unaware of its importance. Needling the reluctant Susan for tepid patriotism, he convinces her to take on the mission as more vital than her vapid plan to join the WACs.

In Algiers, Susan steals the camera from Maritza's bedroom. Not fully trusting Thurston, who she comes to regard as a rascal after being told of his "shady dealings" from his associate, Yvette, Susan plans to take it to the American consulate instead of giving the camera to Thurston. However, her opinion of Thurston quickly changes when Müller detains and questions her while her friend Henri de Lange, a Vichy officer, proves ineffective against German intimidation tactics. Müller mocks Susan and Lange about the importance of selecting one's friends carefully. Thurston arrives on scene and succeeds in rescuing her.

Susan and Thurston take cover in a kasbah with Yvette, who confesses to Susan that she lied about Thurston's dishonesty out of jealousy to discourage her. After developing the film, Thurston recognizes the place in the photos. Schultz, Müller's confederate, finds Thurston, while Susan hides above them in a closet, and Schultz holds Thurston at gunpoint, demanding the camera. Thurston turns over the camera, which no longer contains the film. While Schultz counts to 10 before shooting an uncompliant Thurston, Susan jumps down on him, enabling Thurston to overpower Schultz. They run for it with Schultz in pursuit, but Yvette shoots Schultz, risking the consequences to enable Thurston to complete the mission. Stealing Müller's vehicle, Thurston and Susan race to warn the Allied officers against possible exposure. Using Müller's car as a decoy, they lead the Germans away as the Allies land. Susan and Thurston part as he drops her off before intentionally crashing the vehicle over a cliff.

As the Allies celebrate their Victory, Susan finishes her story to the nurse, lamenting Thurston's absence. Thurston presents himself as she finishes her story, and they embrace.

== Cast ==
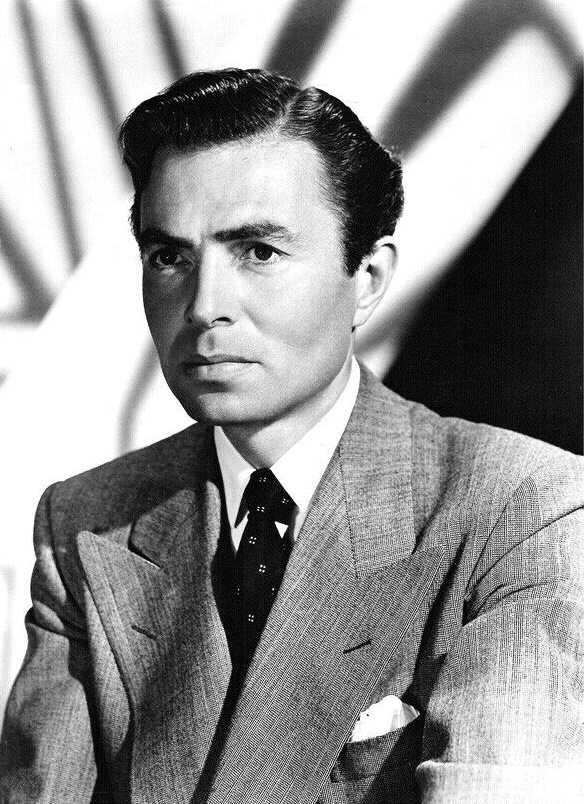
James Mason portrays British Agent Alan Thurston.

- James Mason as Alan Thurston
- Carla Lehmann as Susan Foster
- Raymond Lovell as von Alven
- Enid Stamp Taylor as Maritza
- Walter Rilla as Dr. Müller
- Pamela Stirling as Yvette
- Lea Seidl as Sister
- Sybille Binder as Woman
- Hella Kürty as Maid
- Paul Bonifas as French Proprietor
- Leslie Bradley as Henri de Lange
- Harold Berens as Toni
- Cot D'Ordan as Hotel Manager
- Richard George as Capt. Matthews
- Meinhart Maur as Schultz
- Jacques Metadier as Elderly French Officer
- Michael Morel as Police Commissioner
- Bart Norman as Gen. Mark W. Clark
- Richard Molinas as French Sergeant
- MacDonald Parke as American
- Graham Penley as Pierre
- John Slater as American Officer
- Paul Sheridan as Plainclothes Detective
- Robert Berkeley as Commando Officer
- Albert Whelan as Kadour
- Cecile Chevreau as Nun
- Christiane De Maurin as Singer
- Eric L'Epine Smith as Bit Role

== Reception ==
The film premiered at the Regal, Marble Arch in London on 18 February 1944, but the reviewer for The Times was somewhat disappointed: "Candlelight in Algeria is not the film it might have been with such a theme to inspire it; it shows itself aware of the possibilities, but fails to exploit them."

When the film opened at the Victoria Theater in New York City on 29 July 1944, The New York Times critic Paul P. Kennedy was somewhat more forgiving: "The British Lion production which came to the Victoria Saturday is, as a whole, well put together, and the acting, while not outstanding, is worthy of the film. Add to this the mysterious background of Algiers and a lot of international intrigue and the result is a generally entertaining picture."

According to Kinematograph Weekly the film did well at the British box office in March 1944.
