= Let's Be Happy =

1957 film by Henry Levin

- Original three sheet poster
- Directed by: Henry Levin
- Written by: Dorothy Cooper
- Screenplay by: Diana Morgan (screenwriter)
- Based on: Jeannie (1940 play) by Aimée Stuart
- Produced by: Marcel Hellman
- Starring: Vera-Ellen; Tony Martin; Robert Flemyng
- Cinematography: Erwin Hillier
- Edited by: Edward B. Jarvis
- Music by: Nicholas Brodszky; Angela Morley
- Production companies: Marcel Hellman Productions/ Associated British Picture Corporation
- Distributed by: Associated British-Pathé
- Release date: 9 May 1957
- Running time: 107 minutes
- Country: United Kingdom
- Language: English

Let's Be Happy is a 1957 British Technicolor CinemaScope musical film directed by Henry Levin and starring Tony Martin, Vera-Ellen and Robert Flemyng. It was written by Dorothy Cooper and Diana Morgan The film is an updated remake of Jeannie (1941) which itself was based on the stage play Jeannie by Aimée Stuart.

The film was Vera-Ellen's final film; she later withdrew from public life after the death of her daughter, Victoria Ellen Rothschild. The film was also Tony Martin's final appearance in a movie musical, although he later made a cameo appearance in Dear Mr. Wonderful (1982).

== Plot ==
Jeannie McLean is 28 and lives in rural Vermont. Inheriting a few thousand dollars from her Scottish-born grandfather she was looking after in his old age, she decides to travel to Scotland to see her ancestral country.

On the journey by air and train, Jeannie finds herself continuously near Stanley Smith, a brash washing-machine salesman from Idaho. Having been closely monitored and controlled by her grandfather, she's hesitant to accept his help. However, Jeannie ends up asking for Stanley's aid a few times. His extroverted ways help her through various difficulties such as experiencing turbulence without becoming too nervous, getting through customs and getting seated in the dining car.

Jeannie finally reaches Edinburgh (during the Festival). Losing her room she'd expected to have in a boarding house, she seeks Stanley in his hotel. As he's sorting out her room, the impoverished landowner Lord James MacNairn, who has overheard them talking and believes that she is wealthy, introduces himself.

When Jeannie catches out Stanley in a lie, taking out a red-headed model to dinner instead of her as agreed, she breaks off their friendship and accepts James' attentions. After they sightsee in Edinburgh, Jeannie gets herself spruced up in a beauty salon, then splurges on a designer gown.

Stanley still follows her around, with the pretty French redhead in tow, including taking seats right behind James and Jeannie at the ballet, and inviting them to join him and the model in a restaurant. However, still sore at him, she disregards his invitation.

James takes Jeannie to see Loch Lomond, then to a family wedding of her distant relative and finally to his family home – a huge castle. However, he is restricted to a very small wing of the castle with his housekeeper Miss Cathie, and the rest of the building is open to the public.

James asks Jeannie to marry him, but before she can answer him Stanley approaches them. She tells him she's engaged and he leaves upset. When James learns that she has spent all her inheritance which was only a few thousand, he confesses he originally wanted her for her money but now really does love her. However, now knowing that he is needing someone with money, she turns him down.

Jeannie returns home to Vermont, but Stanley, having made a major sales coup, tracks her down. After declaring his love, he proposes and she accepts.

== Cast ==
- Vera-Ellen as Jeannie MacLean (singing voice dubbed by Joan Small)
- Tony Martin as Stanley Smith
- Robert Flemyng as Lord James MacNairn
- Zena Marshall as Helene
- Helen Horton as Sadie Whitelaw
- Beckett Bould as Rev. MacDonald
- Alfred Burke as French ticket clerk
- Vernon Greeves as first Air France steward
- Richard Molinas as bearded man
- Eugene Deckers as dining car attendant
- Russell Waters as hotel reception clerk
- Paul Young as Bobby, page boy
- Peter Sinclair as MacTavish
- Magda Miller as Mrs. MacTavish
- Brian Oulton as Hotel Valet
- Guy Middleton as Mr. Fielding
- Katherine Kath as Mrs. Fielding
- Charles Carson as Mr. Ferguson, lawyer
- Jock McKay as elderly dancer
- Michael Anthony as Monsieur Fior
- Jameson Clark as MacPhail
- Eric Pohlmann as customs official
- Carl Duering as Customs Inspector
- Molly Weir as flower girl
- Ewan Roberts as hotel porter
- Jean Cadell as Mrs. Cathie
- Gordon Jackson as Dougal MacLean

== Production ==
In 1955 Allied Artists announced it would help finance Jeannie in England.

Location filming took place in Edinburgh and other locations in Scotland, Paris, and Thirlestane Castle which serves as Lord James' country house. It was known in filming as Jeanie.

== Release ==
Let's Be Happy premiered in London on 9 May 1957.

== Reception ==
The film was a box office disappointment.

The Monthly Film Bulletin wrote: "An unpretentious little Cinderella story has been blown up into an elaborate musical, losing most of its charm on the way. The first half-hour is quite simple and pleasing, but when the story moves to Europe it becomes laborious, and is tricked out with production numbers which are for the most part vulgar in conception and undistinguished in execution. Vera-Ellen's artless charm survives a series of unbecoming dresses, but Robert Flemyng looks uneasy in a kilt. Edinburgh in festival time provides an unusual, if not exotic, setting, but in spite of this attempt to break new ground success still eludes the Anglo-American musical."

Kine Weekly wrote: "Its Cinderella-like story, which ends in the hero turning down an impoverished blue-blood for an energetic Yankee travelling salesman, lacks subtlety, but versatile teamwork, fine views of Scotland, scintillating ensembles, and catchy tunes give the innocuous malarky a friendly and engaging air."
