= Caravan (1946 film) =

1946 British film directed by Arthur Crabtree

- Detail from Italian poster
- Directed by: Arthur Crabtree
- Written by: Roland Pertwee scenario editor H Ostrer
- Based on: Caravan by Eleanor Smith
- Produced by: Harold Huth executive Maurice Ostrer
- Starring: Stewart Granger; Jean Kent; Anne Crawford; Dennis Price; Robert Helpmann; Gerard Heinz
- Cinematography: Stephen Dade; Cyril J. Knowles (location photography)
- Edited by: Charles Knott
- Music by: Bretton Byrd (uncredited)
- Distributed by: General Film Distributors (UK)
- Release date: 3 June 1946 (UK); August 1949 (USA)
- Running time: 117 minutes
- Country: United Kingdom
- Language: English
- Box office: 649,800 admissions (France)

Caravan is a 1946 British black-and-white drama film directed by Arthur Crabtree. It was one of the Gainsborough melodramas and is based on the 1942 novel Caravan by Eleanor Smith.

Stewart Granger later called the movie "terrible".

== Plot ==
In early 19th-century London, destitute Richard Darrell rescues Don Carlos from two robbers. When Richard returns for the manuscript he inadvertently left behind, he is encouraged by Don Carlos to talk about his background. The son of a poor country doctor, he met the upper class Oriana Camperdene and Francis Castleton during their childhood; he and Francis became rivals for Oriana's affections. Oriana and her father left for Spain, but the couple were reunited as adults and agreed to marry, much to Francis's disgust. However, they postponed the wedding for a year so that Richard could go to London and make his fortune as a writer. However, though he has completed a novel, no one wants to publish it and his year is almost up. Don Carlos offers to publish it and asks him to take a valuable necklace, which once belonged to Queen Isabella of Castile, to Granada.

Bidding farewell to Oriana, Richard sets out. On the way, he meets Wycroft, who assaults, robs and nearly kills Richard on behalf of his dastardly master, Sir Francis Castleton. Oriana thinks Richard is dead and, with her father recently dead, marries Francis, whilst Richard loses his memory as a result of the assault and marries a gypsy girl named Rosal. However, everyone meets again...

== Cast ==
- Stewart Granger as Richard
- Jean Kent as Rosal
- Anne Crawford as Oriana
- Dennis Price as Francis
- Robert Helpmann as Wycroft
- Gerard Heinz as Don Carlos
- Enid Stamp Taylor as Bertha
- David Horne as Camperdene
- John Salew as Diego
- Arthur Goullet as Suiza
- Julian Somers as Manoel
- Pete Murray as Juan
- Gypsy Petulengro as Paco
- Sylvie St. Clair as Marie
- Henry Morrell as Cumbermere
- Victoria Campbell as Fanny
- Mabel Constanduros as Woman
- Josef Ramart as Jose
- Erin de Selfa as Singer in Cafe
- Philip Guard as Young Francis
- Peter Mullins as Young Richard
- Jacqueline Boyer as Young Oriana

== Production ==
=== Original novel ===
The film was based on a novel by Eleanor Smith which was published in 1943. It was one of several novels by Smith to feature gypsies. Film rights were purchased by Gainsborough Pictures who had enjoyed success during the war with a series of melodramatic movies, starting with The Man in Grey (1943), also based on a novel by Smith. Later Gainsborough melodramas included two which were written by Roland Pertwee and directed by Arthur Crabtree, Madonna of the Seven Moons (1944) and They Were Sisters (1945). The two men worked together again on Caravan.

=== Casting ===
The film's four leads were all under contract to Gainsborough and were well known for appearing in melodramas at the studio. Stewart Granger and Jean Kent had previously appeared together in Fanny By Gaslight and Madonna of the Seven Moons, and Anne Crawford who had been in They Were Sisters. Kent had normally played support roles but Maurice Ostrer, then head of Gainsborough, offered Kent a new contract just before filming which promoted her to star billing. Dennis Price had been in A Place of One's Own (1945) and was used by Gainsborough in the sort of villainous roles that James Mason used to play.

=== Filming ===
The film was meant to follow The Magic Bow, but that was postponed due to the illness of Phyllis Calvert so, Caravan had to be rushed into production. Filming began in June 1945 on location in North Wales, with Snowdon standing in for Spain. The unit then transferred to Gainsborough's studios at Shepherd's Bush in London. Jean Kent met her future husband during the making of the movie. She was described as Gainsborough's backup Margaret Lockwood. Smith died in November 1945, aged only 43.

== Release ==
=== Box office ===
The film was one of the most popular British releases of 1946. According to trade papers, the film was a "notable box office attraction" at British cinemas.

Another source says it was the most successful film at the British box office in 1946 after The Wicked Lady, The Bells of St Marys, Piccadilly Incident, The Captive Heart and The Road to Utopia. According to Kinematograph Weekly the 'biggest winner' at the box office in 1946 Britain was The Wicked Lady, with "runners up" being The Bells of St Marys, Piccadilly Incident, The Road to Utopia, Tomorrow is Forever, Brief Encounter, Wonder Man, Anchors Away, Kitty, The Captive Heart, The Corn is Green, Spanish Main, Leave Her to Heaven, Gilda, Caravan, Mildred Pierce, Blue Dahlia, Years Between, O.S.S., Spellbound, Courage of Lassie, My Reputation, London Town, Caesar and Cleopatra, Meet the Navy, Men of Two Worlds, Theirs is the Glory, The Overlanders, and Bedelia.

=== Critical reception ===
The film was not released in the US until 1949. The New York Times wrote, "Granger and the rest of the cast alternate between grappling with stilted lines and an embarrassingly archaic situation with neither the players nor plot making much entertainment, while 'Caravan' moves with the speed of an oxcart."

TV Guide noted "strong direction, brilliant individual performances, and production values far above the usual run of British films work beautifully together as one melodramatic situation is piled on another."

== Legacy ==
A 2003 article in Film History called it "so wild and unrestrained in its melodrama as to approach the near-burlesque level of the Tod Slaughter melodramas. Much of its fun is centred in the villains, with Dennis Price... and dancer Robert Helpmann teamed to make a bizarre but tremendously effective British Greenstreet/Lorre teaming. The lot throws in just about everything in terms of stock situations and characters, and even turns itself into a Western on occasion. The artificiality of many of the sets, and the fairly obvious back projection, don't add to the conviction – but realism is hardly a strongpoint in a film like this, though it does benefit from far more location shooting than most of its ilk."
