= The Day Will Dawn =

- Theatrical poster for the American release
- Directed by: Harold French
- Written by: Story: Frank Owen; Screenplay: Anatole de Grunwald; Patrick Kirwan; Terence Rattigan
- Produced by: Paul Soskin
- Starring: Ralph Richardson; Deborah Kerr; Hugh Williams; Griffith Jones
- Cinematography: Cyril J. Knowles
- Edited by: Michael C. Chorlton
- Music by: Richard Addinsell orchestrated Roy Douglas
- Production company: A Paul Soskin Production
- Distributed by: General Film Distributors (UK); Paramount Pictures (US)
- Release dates: 8 June 1942 (UK); 24 November 1942 (U.S.)
- Running time: 100 minutes
- Country: United Kingdom
- Language: English

The Day Will Dawn, released in the US as The Avengers, is a 1942 British war film set in Norway during World War II. It stars Ralph Richardson, Deborah Kerr, Hugh Williams and Griffith Jones, and was directed by Harold French from a script written by Anatole de Grunwald, Patrick Kirwan and Terence Rattigan, based on a story by Frank Owen. The music by Richard Addinsell was performed by the London Symphony Orchestra conducted by Muir Mathieson.

== Plot ==
Following the invasion of Poland in September 1939, the former horse racing-correspondent Colin Metcalfe is placed as a foreign correspondent in neutral Norway. Eight months later he meets a Norwegian fisherman, Captain Alstad, in a sailors' bar, where a scuffle breaks out between British and Norwegian sailors (singing "Rule Britannia", egged on by Metcalfe) and German ones (singing the Nazi Party anthem the "Horst-Wessel-Lied"). Alstad takes him aboard his boat during a sea voyage in Norway's territorial waters, during which they sight the Altmark and are fired upon by a German U-boat, despite Norway's neutrality. They then come back to his home port of Langedal, and Metcalfe goes to Oslo to report this to the British embassy there, despite the best efforts of the German Kommandant and the German-sympathising local police chief Ottoman Gunter. There Metcalfe meets Frank Lockwood en route back to England from the Winter War in Finland. It was Lockwood who had got him the foreign correspondent job at the outbreak of war, but he now passes on the news to Metcalfe that he has been fired from it for sailing out with the fisherman rather than staying on dry land where the paper can contact him. Metcalfe informs the embassy, and also warns his paper of signs that a German war on Norway is imminent. Alstad's daughter Kari (who had accompanied them on their voyage) also meets him to tell him of suspicious German merchant ships at Bergen which her father suspects have troops on board.

The pair say goodbye and Metcalfe, getting into what he thinks is a taxi, is kidnapped by the Germans and put on board a ship bound for the German port of Bremen. Meanwhile, Germany invades, Metcalfe is scooped on the news of the invasion, and – back in Britain – Chamberlain's government falls and Churchill becomes prime minister. A British warship intercepts the ship on which Metcalfe is held and liberates him but she is re-routed to Cherbourg to help Operation Aerial, the evacuation of British troops from north-western France, before she can get Metcalfe back to Britain. Amidst the carnage on the docks at Cherbourg, Metcalfe finds Lockwood, dying of wounds.

Back in Britain as the Blitz begins, Metcalfe is persuaded not to join up and instead to start a press campaign for the public to make economies on the Home Front to help win the Battle of the Atlantic. Just about to set out on it, he is called upon by the Admiralty to be parachute-dropped back into Langedal, sabotage a camouflaged U-boat base nearby, and escape across the border into neutral Sweden. On landing, he is spotted and pursued by the Germans, but manages to escape and gain shelter. There he finds that Alstad has been interned by the Germans, and Kari has brought shame on herself by getting engaged to the traitorous Gunter. However, when at a tense "Norwegian-German friendship dance" the Germans arrive to demand Metcalfe's papers, Kari saves him by inciting a riot and hiding him at her house. There she reveals she only took on the engagement to obtain her father's release.

Alstad is released and agrees to help Metcalfe to signal to British bombers with torches to guide them in on their raid on it, and Kari and Metcalfe bid a romantic farewell. The signalling is successful and the base destroyed, but Alstad is killed by a German patrol. Metcalfe returns to tell Kari the news, just as Gunter and the Germans take eight random hostages who will be shot if the British spy they are sheltering is not given up. Metcalfe overhears this, and gives himself up. Gunter returns to Kari to try to save her from the firing squad she too will face for sheltering the spy, but she refuses and is locked up with the hostages, though Gunter shows her the kindness of not separating her from Metcalfe. They prepare to die, and the first party for the firing squad are taken out, but then a British commando raid arrives. In the chaos Gunter is shot by the Kommandant as the latter makes a hasty escape, and the hostages are all freed unharmed. The raiders capture the town and its German garrison and then leave almost immediately, taking Metcalfe, Kari, the hostages and their families to safety in England.

== Cast ==
Main source is the BFI.

- Hugh Williams as Colin Metcalfe
- Griffith Jones as Inspector Gunter
- Deborah Kerr as Kari Alstad
- Ralph Richardson as Frank Lockwood
- Francis L. Sullivan as Kommandant Ulrich Wettau
- Roland Culver as Commander Pittwaters (naval attache)
- Finlay Currie as Captain Alstad
- Niall MacGinnis as Olaf
- Elizabeth Mann as Gerda
- Patricia Medina as Ingrid
- Roland Pertwee as Captain Waverley (naval intelligence)
- Henry Oscar as newspaper editor
- David Horne as Evans, foreign editor
- Henry Hewitt as Jack, news editor
- John Warwick as Milligan, reporter in Fleet Street pub
- Brefni O'Rorke as political journalist
- Bernard Miles as McAllister, Irish soldier
- Beckett Bould as Bergen, spokesman of Langedal
- Olaf Olsen as Langedal's schoolmaster
- Gus McNaughton as army sergeant
- George Carney as Harry, soldier in Fleet Street pub
- John Salew as "man-in-the-street" in Fleet Street pub
- Meriel Forbes as Milly, the barmaid
- Philip Friend as pilot
- George Merritt as German trawler captain
- John Boxer as U-boat commander
- John Slater as American reporter in Oslo
- Jack Watling as Lieutenant
- Valentine Dyall as German guard at cell door hatchway
- Walter Gotell as German soldier
- Victor Weske as Heinrich
- Gerrard Kempinski as barman, Bla Tonne in Oslo
- Ann Farrer as Evans' secretary
- Ronald Adam as Daily Express reporter in phone booth
- George Woodbridge as journalist sitting at bar in pub
- James Knight as Fossen, Langedal's postmaster
- Davis Escott as Hendriksen, Langedal's grocer
- Olav Martin Leirvaag as Pastor Lunder
- Dennis Wyndham as baker
- Madeleine Godar as baker's wife
- Lloyd Pearson as Wettau's assistant
- Stuart Lindsell as reporter
- Patrick Curwen as reporter
- Johnnie Schofield as soldier in Fleet Street pub with Harry
- George Skillan as Fritz
- Albert Chevalier as receptionist
- Brian Nissen as page
- David Carr as navigator
- John Brandon as bomb aimer
- Robert Rendel as captain of destroyer
- Vincent Holman as sergeant-major
- Eric Clavering as American sailor in Bla Tonne, Oslo
- Alan Haines as bomb aimer
- D. J. Williams as Petersen, man mending nets
- Gordon Begg as old man with beard
- Vi Kaley as old woman
- Frank Atkinson as drunk, Oslo quayside

== Critical reception ==
Two reviews written in the 21st century were generally positive.

David Parkinson gave the film three out of five stars in the Radio Times, and wrote, "Markedly less restrained than many other British tales of wartime resistance, this well-meaning flag-waver is far more effective than the majority of have-a-go Hollywood movies on the same theme...what sets this apart is a remarkable cast of British stalwarts, not one of whom puts a foot wrong. Special mention should be made, however, of Deborah Kerr, who lends quiet courage to an unrewarding romantic part, and Francis L Sullivan, who makes a most malevolent Nazi".

The reviewer for The Movie Scene rated the film similarly, although finding it "incredibly dated," but went on to say that it, "does feature a good storyline which is well knit together. It is still entertaining and you can see how it would have served its purpose of rallying British audiences back in the 1940s."
