= D. A. Clarke-Smith =

British actor (1888–1959)

Clarke-Smith in 1921

Douglas Alexander Clarke-Smith (2 August 1888 – 12 March 1959), professionally known as D. A. Clarke-Smith or sometimes Douglas A. Clarke-Smith was a British actor. In a stage career lasting from 1913 to 1954, with interruptions to fight in both World Wars, he played a wide range of roles, in modern commercial plays and established classics. He was seen onstage in the West End, on tour in Britain, and on Broadway. In addition to his stage career, he appeared frequently on BBC radio, and was seen in numerous films between 1929 and 1956.

== Life and career ==
=== Early years ===
Clarke-Smith was born on 2 August 1888 at Montrose, Scotland. He was educated at Blackheath, London, and Pembroke College, Oxford, where he joined the Oxford University Dramatic Society in 1910. He made his professional stage debut at the Kingsway Theatre in 1913 in Arnold Bennett's The Great Adventure, succeeding Clarence Derwent in the role of Ebag. On tour in the same play he was promoted to the leading role, Ilam Carve, created by Henry Ainley.

In 1914 on the outbreak of the First World War Clarke-Smith joined the Royal Artillery, and was mentioned in despatches three times. In 1919 he joined the Birmingham Repertory Company where his roles included Young Marlowe in She Stoops to Conquer, John Worthing in The Importance of Being Earnest, Joseph Surface in The School for Scandal and in Shakespeare, Malvolio in Twelfth Night, Benedick in Much Ado About Nothing, Shylock in The Merchant of Venice and Hotspur in Henry IV, Part 1.

Clarke-Smith was producer for the Lena Ashwell Players for nearly a year from December 1919. In 1920 he married the actress Alice Bowes. They had two children. The marriage was later dissolved. In the 1920s and 1930s Clarke-Smith was often seen on the West End stage in new plays including Six Characters in Search of an Author, and also in classics, playing Bonnington in The Doctor's Dilemma, Rank in A Doll's House, Kroll in Rosmersholm, Brack in Hedda Gabler and Solness in The Master Builder, and Shakespearean roles including Peter Quince in A Midsummer Night's Dream, Malvolio and Benedick. He appeared on Broadway in 1930 in Insult, by J. E. Harold Terry and Harry Tighe.

=== Later years ===
In 1928 Clarke-Smith made the first of his many broadcasts for the BBC. In 1939 he joined the BBC Repertory Company but left later in the year to serve once more in the Army, becoming a staff captain. He was invalided out in 1944 and returned to the stage at the Liverpool Playhouse as a member of the visiting Old Vic Company. In June 1945 he married for the second time; his spouse was Catherine Rosemary Ellis; they had three children. Clarke-Smith's post-war stage career followed the pattern of his earlier years, interspersing new commercial plays with revivals of classics. The latter included Man and Superman in its entirety, including the rarely staged "Don Juan in Hell" episode; he played Roebuck Ramsden in the main play and the Statue of Don Gonzalo in the Hell scene. His final stage role was Mr Myers, QC, in Witness for the Prosecution in 1953–54.

Clarke-Smith died on 12 March 1959, in Withyham in Sussex, aged 70.

=== Filmography ===
Year	Title	Role	Notes
1929	Atlantic	Freddie Tate–Hughes	
1931	Bracelets	Joe le Sage	
1931	Michael and Mary	Harry Price	
1931	The Old Man	John Lorney	
1931	Shadows	Gruhn	
1932	Help Yourself	Maj. Fred Harris	
1932	The Frightened Lady	Dr Amersham	
1932	A Voice Said Goodnight	Philip Gaylor	
1932	A Letter of Warning	Sir James Royd	
1932	Illegal	Franklyn Dean	
1932	White Face	Dr Rudd	
1933	The Good Companions	Ridvers	
1933	Waltz Time	Meyer	
1933	The Ghoul	Mahmoud	
1933	Head of the Family	Welsh	
1933	I Was a Spy	President of Investigation Board	Uncredited
1933	Mayfair Girl	Captain Merrow	
1933	Smithy	Boyd	
1933	Friday the Thirteenth	Max	
1933	Turkey Time	Westbourne	
1933	The Thirteenth Candle	Blades	
1933	The Laughter of Fools	Plunket	
1933	I'm an Explosive	Lord Ferndale	
1933	High Finance	Dodman	
1933	Follow the Lady	Flash Bob	
1934	Flat No. 3	Kettler	
1934	Keep It Quiet	Vendervell	
1934	Designing Women	Bowsfield	
1934	Passing Shadows	Stranger	
1934	Warn London	Dr Nicoletti	
1934	A Cup of Kindness	Mr Jim Finch	
1934	The Perfect Flaw	Louis Maddox	
1934	Money Mad	Phillips	
1934	The Man Who Knew Too Much	Binstead	
1934	Lorna Doone	Counsellor Doone	
1934	The Feathered Serpent	Joe Farmer	
1934	Menace	Sir Robert Conway	
1935	Key to Harmony	Rupert Golder	
1935	Regal Cavalcade	Narrator	Voice
1935	Murder by Rope	Hanson	
1936	Southern Roses	Senor Estrello	
1936	The Happy Family	Mr Harrison	
1937	Cafe Colette		
1937	Splinters in the Air	Warrant Officer	
1937	Little Miss Somebody	Mr Borden	
1938	I've Got a Horse	Fowler, Kings Counsel	
1939	Wanted by Scotland Yard	Inspector Williams	
1939	Flying Fifty-Five	Jacques Gregory	
1947	Frieda	Herriot	
1951	Quo Vadis	Phaon	
1952	Something Money Can't Buy	Critic	
1952	The Pickwick Papers	Dodson	
1953	The Sword and the Rose	Cardinal Wolsey	
1954	Beau Brummell	Sir John Wyatt	Uncredited
1956	The Man Who Never Was	Consul Smith	Uncredited
1956	The Baby and the Battleship	The Admiral	

== References and sources ==
=== Sources ===
- Parker, John; Freda Gaye; Ian Herbert (1978). Who Was Who in the Theatre. Detroit: Gale Research. OCLC 310466458.
