= I Like Your Nerve =

1931 film

- Film poster
- Directed by: William C. McGann
- Written by: Roland Pertwee; Houston Branch
- Starring: Douglas Fairbanks, Jr. Loretta Young
- Cinematography: Ernest Haller
- Edited by: Peter Fritch
- Production company: First National Pictures
- Distributed by: Warner Bros. Pictures
- Release date: September 12, 1931
- Running time: 62 minutes
- Country: United States
- Language: English

I Like Your Nerve is a 1931 American pre-Code romantic comedy film directed by William C. McGann, starring Douglas Fairbanks, Jr. and Loretta Young. Boris Karloff has a small role.

== Plot ==
In Latin America, Larry O'Brien sees Diane Forsythe and quickly falls in love. She, however, is engaged to marry the much older Clive Lattimer. Larry discovers that her motive is to save her stepfather, Areal Pacheco, from being shot. Pacheco, the Minister of Finance, has embezzled $200,000 from the national treasury, and an audit is scheduled soon. Lattimer is extremely wealthy and willing to make up the shortfall in exchange for Diane.

To keep Larry from disrupting the arrangement, Pacheco has his butler Luigi arrange Diane's kidnapping (to Lattimer's country estate). Larry rescues Diane and leaves her in the care of his friend, Archie Lester. Then he telephones a newspaper to report his "ransom" demand of $200,000. Citizens demand Pacheco pay the sum, but Larry points out that Diane's fiancé is the only person in the country with access to that much money. Lattimer refuses at first, but soon caves in to the outrage. Larry collects the money at the arranged dropoff point and later presents it to Pacheco, who then cancels Diane's engagement to Lattimer.

== Cast ==
- Douglas Fairbanks, Jr. as Larry O'Brien
- Loretta Young as Diane Forsythe
- Henry Kolker as Areal Pacheco
- Claud Allister as Archie Lester
- Edmund Breon as Clive Lattimer
- Boris Karloff as Luigi, Pacheco's butler
- Luis Alberni as Sao Pedro Waiter
- Peter Gawthorne as Roberts, Lattimer's Butler
- George Chesebro as Captain of the Guards
- Herbert Bunston as The Colonel
- André Cheron as François - Pacheco's Chauffeur
- George Chesebro as Captain of the Guards
- Harry Cording as San Arango Officer
- Frank Hagney as Rocci - Assassin
- Lillian Kemble-Cooper as Condesa Vecchio
- Ethan Laidlaw as Guard
- Paul Panzer as One of Pacheco's Guards
- Harry Woods as Cellano - Assassin

== Production ==
Warner Bros. paired Fairbanks with Young in a number of sound films.

== See also ==
- Boris Karloff filmography
