= Breach of Promise (1942 film) =

1942 British film by Harold Huth

- Directed by: Harold Huth, Roland Pertwee
- Written by: Story: Emeric Pressburger; Screenplay: Emeric Pressburger, Roland Pertwee
- Produced by: Richard Norton
- Starring: Clive Brook, Judy Campbell, C. V. France, Marguerite Allan, Percy Walsh
- Cinematography: Jack E. Cox
- Edited by: Sidney Cole
- Production company: British Mercury
- Distributed by: MGM (UK), English Films (U.S.)
- Release dates: 20 April 1942 (UK); 5 August 1943 (U.S.)
- Running time: 79 minutes
- Country: United Kingdom
- Language: English

Breach of Promise (also known as Adventure in Blackmail) is a 1942 British romantic comedy film directed by Harold Huth and starring Clive Brook, Judy Campbell, C.V. France, Marguerite Allan and Percy Walsh. It was written by Emeric Pressburger and Roland Pertwee.

== Plot ==
A playwright meets a young woman and she soon files a fake breach of promise action against him, hoping to receive a blackmail payment. Instead he decides to marry her to teach her a lesson.

== Cast ==
- Clive Brook as Peter Conroy
- Judy Campbell as Pamela Lawrence
- C. V. France as Morgan
- Marguerite Allan as Pamela Rose
- Percy Walsh as Saxon Rose
- Dennis Arundell as Phillip
- George Merritt as Professor Beaver
- David Horne as Sir Hamar
- Charles Victor as Sir William
- Aubrey Mallalieu as Judge

== Reception ==
The Monthly Film Bulletin wrote: "This story is described on the synopsis as a gay, lighthearted farce but it is not played as such. As played it is romance with some comedy and as such is very effective. Judy Campbell has plenty to give when she loses some little mannerisms, and adds a distinctive touch to the characterisation of Pamela Lawrence. Clive Brook is, as usual, very finished in performance as, of course, is that excellent artist C. V. France as Morgan, the crooked lawyer."

Kine Weekly wrote: "Clive Brook, although a little stilted for this light-hearted comedy, nevertheless gives a polished performance. The theme is well pointed and its situations capably handled. There is quite a good element of surprise and the romantic angle is popular."

In British Sound Films: The Studio Years 1928–1959 David Quinlan rated the film as "average", writing: "Ordinary comedy, stiffly played."
