= A Voice Said Goodnight =

1932 film

- Directed by: William C. McGann
- Written by: Roland Pertwee; John Hastings Turner
- Produced by: Irving Asher
- Starring: Nora Swinburne; Jack Trevor; D. A. Clarke-Smith
- Production company: Warner Brothers
- Distributed by: Warner Brothers
- Release date: March 1932
- Running time: 35 minutes
- Country: United Kingdom
- Language: English

A Voice Said Goodnight is a 1932 British short crime film directed by William C. McGann and starring Nora Swinburne, Jack Trevor and D. A. Clarke-Smith. It was written by Roland Pertwee and John Hastings Turner and was made as a quota quickie at Teddington Studios by Warner Brothers; a scene was also shot at Teddington Lock.

== Preservation status ==
The British Film Institute National Archive holds a collection of stills but no film or video materials.

== Plot ==
Joan Creighton had borrowed money from moneylender Philip Gaylor. Following the discovery of her body in a river, Gaylor is found murdered. Her husband Gerald is suspected of the crime, but the actual solution of the mystery is a surprise.

== Cast ==
- Nora Swinburne as Joan Creighton
- Jack Trevor as Gerald Creighton
- D. A. Clarke-Smith as Philip Gaylor
- John Turnbull as Inspector Lavory
- Daphne Scorer as Annie
- Wilfrid Caithness as Beldon
- Roland Culver as reporter

== Reception ==
Kine Weekly wrote: "An interesting murder drama with plenty of action and a story that succeeds in keeping the identity of the murderer in doubt until the very end. Good booking proposition for most audiences. ... Nora Swinburne and Jack Trevor play the parts of Mr and Mrs. Creighton well, with plenty of feeling. ... The drama develops on sound lines, holding the interest all the time."
