= Illegal (1932 film) =

1932 film

- Directed by: William C. McGann
- Written by: Irving Asher; Roland Pertwee
- Produced by: Irving Asher
- Starring: Isobel Elsom; Ivor Barnard; D. A. Clarke-Smith
- Cinematography: Willard Van Enger; Cyril J. Knowles
- Edited by: John Rawlins
- Music by: Billy Gerhardi
- Production company: Warner Bros. Pictures
- Distributed by: Warner Bros. Pictures
- Release date: 29 September 1932
- Running time: 64 minutes
- Country: United Kingdom
- Language: English

Illegal is a 1932 British crime drama film directed by William C. McGann and starring Isobel Elsom, Ivor Barnard and D. A. Clarke-Smith. It was written by Irving Asher and Roland Pertwee.

== Synopsis ==
After her second husband drinks and gambles all her money away, a woman leaves him and decides to set up an out-of-hours drinking and gambling club in order to send her daughters to elite schools.

== Cast ==
- Isobel Elsom as Mrs. Evelyn Dean
- Ivor Barnard as Albert
- D. A. Clarke-Smith as Franklyn Dean
- Margot Grahame as Dorothy Turner
- Moira Lynd as Ann Turner
- Edgar Norfolk as Lord Alan Sevington
- Wally Patch as Bookie
- Margaret Damer as Headmistress

== Production ==
The film was made as a quota quickie at Teddington Studios by the British branch of Warner Brothers.

== Reception ==
Kine Weekly wrote: "There is quite a good theme of a mother's sacrifices for her daughter. The plot is rather slight and slow in development, but it contains popular elements which, together with the stars, should make a good appeal to the masses. ... William McGann has hardly made the most of the situations of the story. It is inclined to be cramped and jerky in continuity. This is accentuated by the singing of four songs, which incline to hold up the action, although they are well enough sung in themselves. He has staged, however, an effective raid, and gets some poignant moments."

Picturegoer wrote: "Although there is quite a good theme here of a mother who makes every sacrifice for her daughters after she has nearly been ruined by her drunken husband, it is rather spoiled by the slow development and the cramped and jerky continuity. Isobel Elsom, as the mother who runs a cabaret and is sent to jail when it is raided, while not very varied in expression, does manage to express the necessary motherlove note. Margot Grahame sings four songs which are good enough in themselves, but are apt to hold up the action. The best acting comes from D.A. Clark-Smith as the drunken husband and Ivor Barnard as a Cockney waiter, whose loyalty to the mother affords a human, sentimental touch. The best bit of production is the effective raid, and London exteriors provide a good and authentic atmosphere."

In British Sound Films: The Studio Years 1928–1959 David Quinlan rated the film as "mediocre", writing: "aggressively glum melodrama."

== Bibliography ==
- Chibnall, Steve. Quota Quickies: The Birth of the British 'B' Film. British Film Institute, 2007.
- Low, Rachael. Filmmaking in 1930s Britain. George Allen & Unwin, 1985.
- Wood, Linda. British Films, 1927–1939. British Film Institute, 1986.
