= The Four Just Men (1939 film) =

1939 film by Walter Forde

- Original Australian trade ad
- Directed by: Walter Forde
- Written by: Angus MacPhail; Sergei Nolbandov; Roland Pertwee
- Based on: The Four Just Men by Edgar Wallace
- Produced by: Michael Balcon
- Starring: Hugh Sinclair; Griffith Jones; Francis L. Sullivan; Frank Lawton; Anna Lee
- Cinematography: Ronald Neame
- Edited by: Stephen Dalby; Charles Saunders
- Music by: Ernest Irving
- Production company: Ealing Studios
- Distributed by: ABFD (UK); Monogram Pictures (US)
- Release date: 7 June 1939
- Running time: 85 minutes
- Country: United Kingdom
- Language: English

The Four Just Men (also known as The Secret Four) is a 1939 British thriller film directed by Walter Forde and starring Hugh Sinclair, Griffith Jones, Edward Chapman and Frank Lawton. It was written by Angus MacPhail, Sergei Nolbandov and Roland Pertwee, based on the 1905 novel The Four Just Men by Edgar Wallace. There was a previous silent film version in 1921. This version was produced by Ealing Studios, with sets designed by Wilfred Shingleton.

The Four Just Men was re-released in 1944 with an updated ending featuring newsreel of Winston Churchill and the Allied war effort as a fulfilment of the ideals of the Four. The adviser on the House of Commons of the United Kingdom scenes was Aneurin Bevan.

== Premise ==
The Four Just Men are British World War I veterans who unite to work in secret against enemies of the country. They are notabove a spot of murder or sabotage to achieve their ends, but they consider themselves true patriots.

== Cast ==
- Hugh Sinclair as Humphrey Mansfield
- Griffith Jones as James Brodie
- Francis L. Sullivan as Leon Poiccard
- Frank Lawton as Terry
- Anna Lee as Ann Lodge
- Alan Napier as Sir Hamar Ryman M.P.
- Basil Sydney as Frank Snell
- Lydia Sherwood as Myra Hastings
- Edward Chapman as B. J. Burrell
- Athole Stewart as Police Commissioner
- George Merritt as Inspector Falmouth
- Garry Marsh as Bill Grant
- Ellaline Terriss as Lady Willoughby
- Roland Pertwee as Mr Hastings
- Eliot Makeham as Simmons
- Frederick Piper as pickpocket
- Henrietta Watson as Mrs Truscott
- Jon Pertwee as rally campaigner
- Liam Gaffney as taxi driver
- James Knight as policeman outside parliament
- Charles Paton as platform speaker
- Percy Walsh as prison governor
- Percy Parsons as American broadcaster
- Bryan Herbert as taxi driver
- Arthur Hambling as Constable Benham

== Critical reception ==
The Monthly Film Bulletin wrote: "It has drama, thrills, sustained suspense, and an unusual and impressive climax. ... The team work of the cast is excellent. The parts of the Four Just Men are admirably played, while Alan Napier makes a plausible villain, and Basil Sydney is a suitably 'nasty bit of work' as his assistant. The settings are varied and effective, a reproduction of the House of Commons being particularly good."

The Daily Film Renter wrote: "Exciting melodrama, replete with requisite 'business,' and slickly acted, show moves smoothly to suspenseful climax, with rousing motif, and represents absolutely satisfying popular entertainment, with Wallace name big draw. Based on one of Edgar Wallace's early thrillers, this is a hearty specimen of audience hokum depicting the exploits of four staunch patriots who get together to foil an enemy scheme for the smashing of Britain's Empire."

The New York Times reviewer wrote, "Four Just Men, by Edgar Wallace, whatever it might have been, was probably not a work of literature, and therefore, on that charitable assumption, it is gently, rather than harshly, that one must deal with the British-made screen version, now on view at the Globe Theatre. Like all pictures seeping over from England nowadays, it is more than a little infected with the virus propagandistus, but, over and above that common-carrier failing, it is a model of sheer incredibility crossed with what (carrying out the charity idea) we might designate as espionage melodrama".

In the Radio Times David Parkinson wrote: "it defiantly suggests that Britain could never fall under the sway of a dictator. But in all other respects it's a rollicking boys' own adventure, with some of the most fiendishly comic-book murders you will ever see... hugely entertaining sub-Hitchcockian antics".
