= Out to Win (play) =

Out to Win is a 1921 British melodramatic play written by Roland Pertwee and Dion Clayton Calthrop. It portrays two rival business empires competing for a chemical concession in a foreign country and resorting to violence to achieve their ends. The hero, Anthony Barraclough, "has discovered the whereabouts of a whole field of radium".

The play was produced at the Shaftesbury Theatre in London in June 1921. The producer was Robert Courtneidge. George Tully played the double role of Barraclough and his double, Richard Frencham Altar. The role of Barraclough's fiancée, Isabel Irish, was played by Madge Compton, and Hilda Bayley was his previous love interest, Auriol Craven. Edith Evans played Barraclough's mother. Violet Graham played his mother's driver or chaffeuse.

The Play Pictorial described the play as "full of stirring deeds and forceful action ... episode succeeds episode with such swiftness and intensity that the spectator has no time for thought, or to ponder judicially on the probability of the various incidents".

== Adaptation ==
In 1923 the play was turned into a silent film Out to Win directed by Denison Clift and starring Catherine Calvert and Clive Brook.

== Bibliography ==
- Kabatchnik, Amnon. Blood on the Stage, 1925-1950: Milestone Plays of Crime, Mystery and Detection. Scarecrow Press, 2010.
