= William McGann =

American film director (1893–1977)

William C. McGann
- Born: April 15, 1893; Pittsburgh, Pennsylvania, US
- Died: November 15, 1977 (aged 84); Los Angeles, California, US
- Occupation: Film director
- Years active: 1930–1942

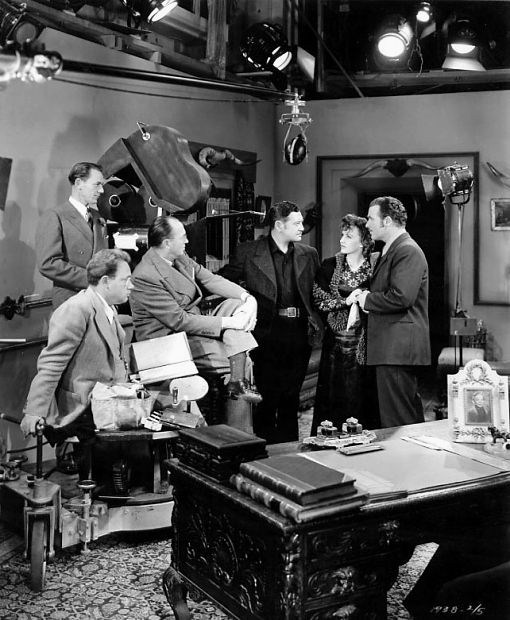
Russell Harlan (cinematographer, standing), unknown, William C. McGann (director), Richard Dix, Frances Gifford & Preston Foster on the set of American Empire (1942)

William C. McGann (April 15, 1893 – November 15, 1977) was an American film director. He directed more than 50 films between 1930 and 1942. He was born in Pittsburgh, Pennsylvania and died in Los Angeles, California. He worked for ten years for Warner Bros. Pictures as director and assistant director, until 1939.

== Partial filmography ==
- When the Clouds Roll By (1919)
- The Mollycoddle (1920)
- The Mark of Zorro (1920)
- Three Ages (1923)
- Footloose Widows (1926)
- The Stolen Jools (1931)
- I Like Your Nerve (1931)
- Illegal (1932)
- A Voice Said Goodnight (1932)
- Her Night Out (1932)
- Impromptu (1932)
- Little Fella (1933)
- Times Square Playboy (1936)
- Two Against the World (1936)
- Penrod and Sam (1937)
- Marry the Girl (1937)
- Sh! The Octopus (1937)
- Girls on Probation (1938)
- Blackwell's Island (1939)
- Everybody's Hobby (1939)
- Dr. Christian Meets the Women (1940)
- A Shot in the Dark (1941)
- Highway West (1941)
- Tombstone, the Town Too Tough to Die (1942)
