= Cyril J. Knowles =

British cinematographer

Cyril J. Knowles (1905–1961) was a British cinematographer. His credits include The Day Will Dawn (1942), Sodom and Gomorrah (1963), the location photography on Caravan (1946), and the African exterior shots on King Solomon's Mines (1937).

== Selected filmography ==
- Illegal (1932)
- An Englishman's Home (1940)
