= Talk About Jacqueline =

- Spanish poster
- Directed by: Harold French; Paul L. Stein
- Screenplay by: Roland Pertwee; Marjorie Deans; Katrin Holland (novel)
- Produced by: Marcel Hellman
- Starring: Hugh Williams; Carla Lehmann; Roland Culver
- Cinematography: Bernard Knowles; Cyril J. Knowles
- Production companies: Excelsior Productions (Marcel Hellman Productions)
- Distributed by: MGM (U.K. and U.S.)
- Release date: 30 November 1942 (U.K.)
- Running time: 84minutes
- Country: United Kingdom
- Language: English

Talk About Jacqueline is a 1942 British comedy film directed by Harold French and Paul L. Stein and starring Hugh Williams, Carla Lehmann and Roland Culver. It was written by Roland Pertwee and Marjorie Deans, based on the 1926 novel Man spricht über Jacqueline by Katrin Holland which had previously been made into a 1937 German film.

A woman tries to conceal her questionable past from her new husband.

== Plot ==
Two sisters, Jacqueline and June, are very close and stand by each other, even though their stories separate them. The older sister, Jacqueline, has a sexually liberal backstory, and the younger is quite unspoiled by life. Jacqueline travels to the French Riviera for a change of scenery and to look for new adventures and search for an eligible bachelor who has no prior knowledge about her promiscuous past. She finds a suitable man, Doctor Michael Thomas, and they get married. Eventually, Jacqueline is haunted by her past, when her picture turns up in a tabloid newspaper, and her husband catches a glimpse of his new bride's flamboyant previous life. Jacqueline's sister June decides to help out her older sister to save her marriage from falling apart. She tells Michael that she is the one who has fooled around in the recent past. However, this information then gives her problems, when it finds its way to her own romantic interests, and threatens her own love life. Eventually, Jacqueline confesses her past to her husband and the other involved parties, rescuing her sister's reputation.

== Cast ==
- Hugh Williams as Doctor Michael Thomas
- Carla Lehmann as Jacqueline Marlow
- Roland Culver as Leslie Waddington
- Joyce Howard as June Marlow
- John Warwick as Donald Clark
- Mary Jerrold as Aunt Hellen
- Guy Middleton as Captain Tony Brook
- Max Adrian as Lionel
- Katie Johnson as Ethel
- Martita Hunt as Colonel's wife
- Anthony Holles as attendant
- Roland Pertwee as doctor in hospital

== Reception ==
The Monthly Film Bulletin wrote: "This is an elegant film with the finish in direction and production that is usually only connected with American films of this type. Carla Lehmann is beautiful and charming and glamorous as Jacqueline, Hugh Williams gives a delightful performance as Michael, and Joyce Howard is quite admirable as the naive but noble June. It would be invidious to single out other members of the team who add to its success."

Kine Weekly wrote: "The story is concerned with monied rather than important people, yet frivolous as it is, it has sufficient heart interest behind its conventional prewar smart set facade to excite the emotions of the unsophisticated. In other words, it subtly appeals to the snobbery in the average English man and woman. Its showmanship and nostalgic touch – its characters and its environment have gone for ever – make it a reasonably safe box-office proposition for all but the intelligentsia."

Variety wrote: "Not likely this will go far, on either side of the Atlantic. Improbable story must have lost much in transition from book to screen, with hackneyed 'should a woman tell?' theme that is also reminiscent of Michael Arlen's Green Hat. ... Production is on a generally meretorious scale and little fault is to be found with direction. Supporting cast, as frequently happens in British pictures, is equal, if not superior, to featured players, Hugh Williams having little to do but yearn and brood over his unsought romance. Roland Culver, as always, gives a polished performance as his friend who tries to save him from getting hurt."
