= Out to Win (1923 film) =

1923 film by Denison Clift

- Directed by: Denison Clift
- Written by: Dion Clayton Calthrop (play); Roland Pertwee (play)
- Starring: Catherine Calvert; Clive Brook; Irene Norman; Cameron Carr
- Production company: Ideal Film Company
- Distributed by: Ideal Film Company
- Release date: 1923
- Country: United Kingdom
- Language: English

Out to Win is a 1923 British silent drama film directed by the American filmmaker Denison Clift and starring Catherine Calvert, Clive Brook and Irene Norman. It was based on the 1921 play Out to Win by Dion Clayton Calthrop and Roland Pertwee.

== Cast ==
- Catherine Calvert as Auriole Craven
- Clive Brook as Barraclough / Altar
- Irene Norman as Isobel
- Cameron Carr as Harrison Smith
- A. B. Imeson as Ezra Phipps
- Ivo Dawson as Lawrence
- Olaf Hytten as Cumberston
- Norman Page as Van Diet
- Robert English as Lord Altmont Frayne
- Ernest A. Douglas as Hilbert Torrington
- James McWilliams as Doran
- Daisy Campbell as Mrs. Barraclough
- Ernest A. Dagnall as Sydney

== Reception ==
An 1923 issue of The Motion Picture Studio called the film "best of the year’s melodramas" The film was described as a "thrill-packed melodrama", in which Brook plays double roles.
