= William Friese-Greene =

British photographer and inventor (1855–1921)

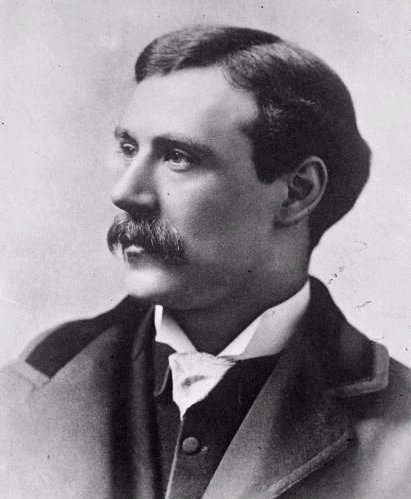
- Friese-Greene c. 1890
- Born: William Edward Green; 7 September 1855; Bristol, England
- Died: 5 May 1921 (aged 65); London, England
- Resting place: Highgate Cemetery
- Occupation: Inventor • photographer
- Known for: Motion pictures • printing • photography
- Spouse(s): Victoria Mariana Helena Friese (m. 1874-1895, her death); Edith Jane Harrison (m. 1897-1921; his death)
- Children: 7, including Claude
- Relatives: Tim Friese-Greene (great-grandson)

William Friese-Greene (born William Edward Green, 7 September 1855 – 5 May 1921) was a prolific English inventor and professional photographer. He was known as a pioneer in the field of motion pictures, having devised a series of cameras between 1888–1891 and shot moving pictures with them in London. He went on to patent an early two-colour filming process in 1905. Wealth came with inventions in printing, including phototypesetting and a method of printing without ink, and from a chain of photographic studios. However, Friese-Greene spent all his money on inventing, went bankrupt three times, was jailed once, and died in poverty.

== Early life ==
William Edward Green was born on 7 September 1855, in Bristol. He studied at the Queen Elizabeth's Hospital school. In 1871, he was apprenticed to the Bristol photographer Marcus Guttenberg, but later successfully went to court to be freed early from the indentures of his seven-year apprenticeship. He married the Swiss, Helena Friese (born Victoria Mariana Helena Friese), on 24 March 1874 and, in a remarkable move for the era, decided to add her maiden name to his surname. In 1876, he set up his own studio in Bath and, by 1881, had expanded his business, having more studios in Bath, Bristol and Plymouth.

== Cinematic inventor ==
=== Experiments with magic lanterns ===
In Bath he came into contact with John Arthur Roebuck Rudge. Rudge was a scientific instrument maker who also worked with electricity and magic lanterns to create popular entertainments. Rudge built what he called the Biophantic Lantern, which could display seven photographic slides in rapid succession, producing the illusion of movement. It showed a sequence in which Rudge (with the invisible help of Friese-Greene) apparently took off his head. Friese-Greene was fascinated by the machine and worked with Rudge on a variety of devices over the 1880s, various of which Rudge called the Biophantascope. Moving his base to London in 1885, Friese-Greene realised that glass plates would never be a practical medium for continuously capturing life as it happens. Hence he began experiments with the new Eastman paper roll film, made transparent with castor oil, before turning his attention to experimenting with celluloid as a medium for motion picture cameras.

=== Movie cameras ===
Moving images captured by Friese-Greene at Hyde Park (left) and King's Road (right)

In 1888, Friese-Greene had some form of moving picture camera constructed, the nature of which is not known. On 21 June 1889, Friese-Greene was issued patent no. 10131 for a motion-picture camera, in collaboration with a civil engineer, Mortimer Evans. It was apparently capable of taking up to ten photographs per second using paper and celluloid film. An illustrated report on the camera appeared in the British Photographic News on 28 February 1890. On 18 February, Friese-Greene sent details of the camera to Thomas Edison, whose laboratory had begun developing a motion picture system, with a peephole viewer, later christened the Kinetoscope. The Photographic News report was reprinted in Scientific American on 19 April. In 1890 he developed a camera with Frederick Varley to shoot stereoscopic moving images. This ran at a slower frame rate, and although the 3D arrangement worked, there are no records of projection. Friese-Greene worked on a series of moving picture cameras into the early 1890s, but although many individuals recount seeing his projected images privately, he never gave a successful public projection of moving pictures. Friese-Greene's experiments with motion pictures were to the detriment of his other business interests and in 1891 he was declared bankrupt. He had sold the rights to the 1889 moving picture camera patent for £500 to investors in the City of London. The renewal fee was never paid and the patent lapsed.

=== Colour film ===
Friese-Greene's later exploits were in the field of colour in motion pictures. From 1904 he lived in Brighton where there were a number of experimenters developing still and moving pictures in colour. Initially working with William Norman Lascelles Davidson, Friese-Greene patented a two-colour moving picture system using prisms in 1905. He and Davidson gave public demonstrations of this in January and July 1906 and Friese-Greene held screenings at his photographic studio.

He also experimented with a system which produced the illusion of true colour by exposing each alternate frame of ordinary black-and-white film stock through two or three different coloured filters. Each alternate frame of the monochrome print was then stained red or green (and/or blue). Although the projection of prints did provide an impression of colour, it suffered from red and green fringing when the subject was in rapid motion, as did the more popular and famous system, Kinemacolor.

In 1911, Charles Urban filed a lawsuit against Harold Speer, who had purchased rights in Friese-Greene's 1905 patent and created a company 'Biocolour', claiming that this process infringed upon the Kinemacolor patent of George Albert Smith, despite the fact that Friese-Greene had both patented and demonstrated his work before Smith. Urban was granted an injunction against Biocolour in 1912, but the Sussex-based, racing driver Selwyn Edge funded an appeal to the High Court. This overturned the original verdict on the grounds that Kinemacolor made claims for itself which it could not deliver. Urban fought back and pushed it up to the House of Lords, which in 1915 upheld the decision of the High Court. The decision benefited nobody. For Urban it was a case of hubris because now he could no longer exercise control over his own system, so it became worthless. For Friese-Greene, the arrival of the war and personal poverty meant there was nothing more to be done with colour for some years.

His son Claude Friese-Greene continued to develop the system with his father, after whose death in the early 1920s he called it "The Friese-Greene Natural Colour Process" and shot with it the documentary films "The Open Road", which offer a rare portrait of 1920s Britain in colour. These were featured in a BBC series The Lost World of Friese-Greene and then issued in a digitally restored form by the BFI on DVD in 2006.

== Death ==
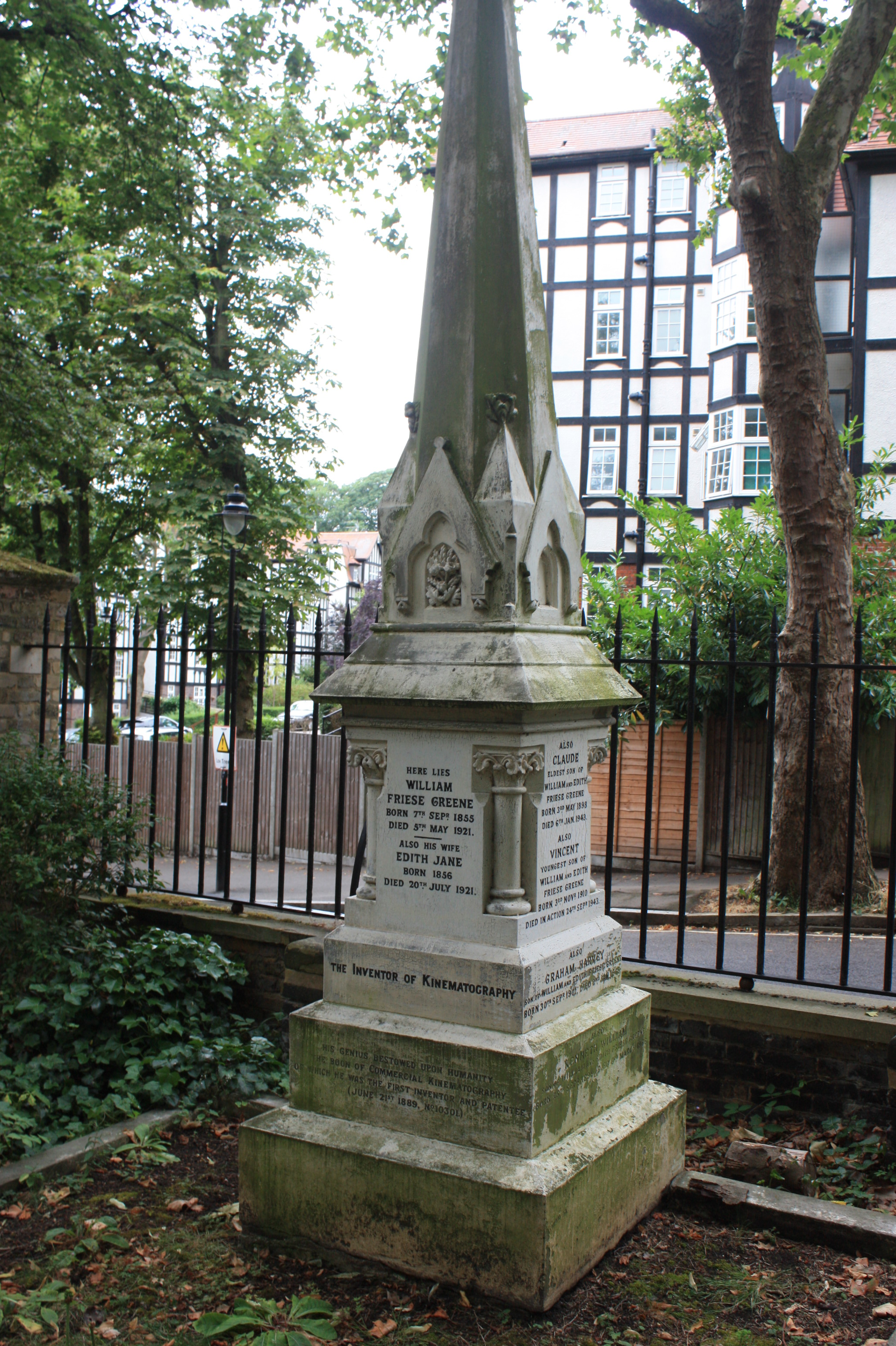
The Friese-Greene grave in Highgate Cemetery

On 5 May 1921, Friese-Greene – then a largely forgotten figure – attended a stormy meeting of the cinema trade at the Connaught Rooms in London. The meeting had been called to discuss the current poor state of British film distribution and was chaired by Lord Beaverbrook. Disturbed by the tone of the proceedings, Friese-Greene got to his feet to speak. The chairman asked him to come forward onto the platform to be heard better, which he did, appealing for the two sides to come together. Shortly after returning to his seat, he collapsed. People went to his aid and took him outside, but he died almost immediately of heart failure.

Given his dramatic death in poverty (his pockets contained only one shilling and ten pence when he died), surrounded by film industry representatives who had almost entirely forgotten about his role in motion pictures, there was a spasm of collective shock and guilt. A very grand funeral was staged for him, with the streets of London lined by the curious. A two-minute silence was observed in some cinemas, and a fund was raised to commission a memorial for his grave. He was buried in the eastern section of London's Highgate Cemetery, just south of the entrance and visible from the street through the railings. However, his memorial was not designed by Edwin Lutyens, as is often stated. It describes him as "The Inventor of Kinematography", a term Friese-Greene never used in talking about his achievements. Indeed, he often spoke generously about other workers in the field of capturing movement.

His second wife, Edith Jane, died a few months later of cancer and is buried with him, as are some of his children.

== Family ==
After the death of his first wife, with whom he had one daughter, Friese-Greene married Edith Jane Harrison (1875–1921) and they had six sons, one dying in infancy. The eldest, Claude (1898–1943), and the youngest, Vincent (1910–1943), are buried with their parents. Vincent was killed in action during the Second World War.

His great-grandson is the musician Tim Friese-Greene.

== Legacy ==
In 1951 a biopic was made, starring Robert Donat, based on the biography, Friese-Greene, Close-Up of an Inventor, as part of the Festival of Britain. The film, The Magic Box, was not shown until the festival was nearly over and only went on full release after it had finished. Despite the all-star cast, positive reviews, and much praise for Robert Donat's performance, it was not a financial success. Nonetheless, Martin Scorsese has many times cited it as one of his favourite films, and one that inspired him.

The film did not portray Friese-Greene as the inventor of motion pictures, only a "pioneer", but some of the British press represented the film as if it did. The pro-Edison American film historian Terry Ramsaye called the film a "perversion of history". In 1955, Kodak employee Brian Coe wrote an article in the British Journal of Photography called "The Truth About Friese Greene" in reaction against the biography and the film, which expressed the view that Friese-Greene had not made any contribution to the development of the motion picture. Although Coe's work was much cited for decades, it has been discredited by more recent research.

Friese-Greene was from then on more or less banished to obscurity by film historians, but newer research is rehabilitating him, giving a better understanding of his achievements and influence on the technical development of cinema.

Despite a campaign by Bristol photographer Reece Winstone for the retention of Friese-Greene's birthplace for use as a Museum of Cinematography, among other purposes, it was demolished by Bristol Corporation in 1958 to provide parking space for six cars.

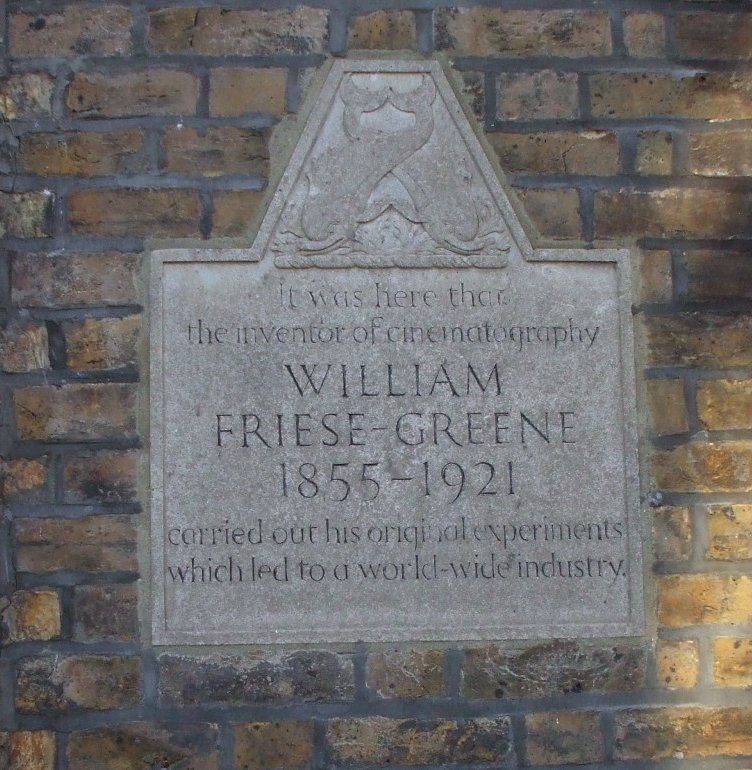
Plaque at Middle Street, Brighton

Premises in Brighton's Middle Street where Friese-Greene had a workshop for several years are often wrongly described as his home. They bear a plaque in a 1924 design by Eric Gill commemorating Friese-Greene's achievements, wrongly stating that it is the place where he invented cinematography. The plaque was unveiled by Michael Redgrave, who had appeared in The Magic Box, in September 1951. A modern office building a few yards away is named Friese-Greene House. Other plaques include the 1930s Odeon Cinema in Kings Road, Chelsea, London, with its iconic façade, which carries high upon it a large sculpted head-and-shoulders medallion of "William Friese-Greene" and his years of birth and death. There are busts of him at Pinewood Studios and Shepperton Studios.

In 2006 the BBC ran a series of programmes called The Lost World of Friese-Greene, presented by Dan Cruickshank about Claude Friese-Greene's road trip from Land's End to John o' Groats, entitled The Open Road, which he filmed from 1924 to 1926 using The Friese-Greene Natural Colour Process. The British Film Institute then worked on a new version, using post-production techniques to reduce the problems of flickering and colour fringing around moving objects, which Kinemacolor and this process had when projected. The result was a unique view of Britain in colour in the mid-1920s and extracts of it continue to frequently circulate virally on social media.

== See also ==
- History of film technology
