= Murray Fraser (architect) =

Professor of architecture

Murray Fraser (born 7 July 1958, Glasgow, Scotland) is Professor of Architecture and Global Culture at the Bartlett School of Architecture, University College London (UCL).

Trained as an architect and architectural historian at the Bartlett School of Architecture, he taught at Oxford Brookes University and Westminster University prior to rejoining the Bartlett in July 2011. From 2012 to 2019 he served as Vice-Dean of Research for UCL's Bartlett Faculty of the Built Environment.

In 2018 Fraser received the Annie Spink Award for Excellence in Architectural Education from the Royal Institute of British Architects (RIBA).

== Publications ==
Fraser's academic writings include pioneering studies in post-colonialism, cultural studies, globalisation theory and design research. His early research looked into links between architecture and colonial policy in Ireland, with his doctorate being published in 1996 as John Bull's Other Homes: State Housing and British Policy in Ireland, 1883-1922.

His next book, Architecture and the 'Special Relationship': The American Influence on Post-War British Architecture, won the 2008 President's Research Award from the RIBA as well as the 2008 Bruno Zevi Book Prize from the International Committee of Architectural Critics (CICA) for best publication in the field that year.

In 2013 he published an edited collection on Design Research in Architecture which is now a standard work on the topic. He also edits the UCL Press book series of that same title alongside his Bartlett colleague Jonathan Hill and Lesley Lokko of the African Futures Institute in Ghana.

Fraser is General Editor for the 21st Edition of the retitled Sir Banister Fletcher's Global History of Architecture. As the most extensive world survey of the subject to date, it was awarded the 2020 Colvin Prize by the Society of Architectural Historians of Great Britain.

== Architectural practice ==
Fraser worked as a housing architect in the 1980s for the London Borough of Haringey, before joining Architype Architects to carry out the refurbishment of a local community centre in Wapping. The renovation design for his own house in north London was highly commended in a 2003 RIBA competition.

Consultancy work with Nasser Golzari and Yara Sharif in the Palestine Regeneration Team (PART) led to involvement in two prize-winning projects in the West Bank: the revitalization of the historic centre of Birzeit that won a 2013 Aga Kahn Award, and the Women's Eco-Kitchen in Beit Iksa that was given a 2014 Holcim Sustainability Award.

He has also been engaged on speculative designs for more sustainable forms of social housing in London.

== Roles and honours ==
Fraser is Chair of the Society of Architectural Historians of Great Britain.

He was a founding member of the UK's Architectural Humanities Research Association (AHRA) in 2003 and the Architectural Research in Europe Network Association (ARENA) in 2013.

He was formerly editor of The Journal of Architecture from 2007 to 2012, he is currently Editor-in-Chief of the ARENA Journal of Architectural Research (AJAR).

Fraser was a Distinguished Visiting Professor at the Technology University of Malaysia in Johor Bahru and later at the Chinese University of Hong Kong. He is a Macgeorge Fellow at the University of Melbourne in Australia.

== Selected publications ==
- 'Public Building and Colonial Policy in Dublin, 1760–1800’, Architectural History, Vol. 28: 1985, pp. 102–112.
- John Bull's Other Homes: State Housing and British Policy in Ireland, 1883–1922, Liverpool: Liverpool University Press, 1996.
- Architecture and the 'Special Relationship': The American Influence on Post-War British Architecture (with Joe Kerr), London/New York: Routledge, 2007.
- Critical Architecture, edited with Jane Rendell et al, London/New York: Routledge, 2007.
- Archigram Archival Project, an online resource created along with Kester Rattenbury, 2010.
- Design Research in Architecture: An Overview, Farnham: Ashgate, 2013.
- Architecture and Globalisation in the Persian Gulf Region, edited with Nasser Golzari, Farnham: Ashgate, 2013.
- Sir Banister Fletcher's Global History of Architecture (21st Edition, 2 Vols), London: Bloomsbury, 2020.
  - Honorable mention for the Dartmouth Medal, 2020
- 'Gottfried Semper and the Globalising of the London Building World in the 1850s', in Michael Gnehm and Sonja Hildebrand (eds), Semper in London, Mendrisio/Zurich: Università della Svizzera italiana/ETH Zurich Press, 2021.
