= Nasser Golzari =

- Born: Iran
- Years active: 1990–present
- Spouse: Yara Sharif

Nasser Golzari is an Iranian-British architect and an academic. He is the principal partner in Golzari - NG Architects practice in London. Golzari is the design module leader at the University of Westminster, Masters of Architecture: Cultural Identity and Globalisation. He was also the architecture pathway leader at University of the Arts London from 2004 to 2010. He was a visiting professor at Art University of Isfahan and visiting critic at a number of universities in the UK and abroad. Golzari was the founding editor of A3 Times architectural magazine and A3 Forum.

As an architect, Golzari has worked both in private and public sector since 1985 on a number of projects nationally and internationally, building a number of educational and residential projects, some of which have been nominated for Civic Trust Award. For a number of years he has been active in design and research on urban strategies for local government and municipalities, including specific interest on the subject of sustainability, environment and cultural identity.

His current architectural projects stretch from Europe to the Middle East. These include design projects of schools, housing and sustainable urban regeneration. One of his current activities is the setting up of Palestine Regeneration Team (PART), in collaboration with Professor Murray Fraser and Yara Sharif. PART is design-led research group exploring innovative approaches to urban reconstruction in the Middle East in the aim to heal spatial fractures caused by conflict and occupation.

NG Architects recent project in collaboration with Palestinian NGO Riwaq has won the Holcim Award for Sustainable Construction (Acknowledgment Prize) for their Eco Kitchen complex in the historic centre of Beit Iksa.

== Early life ==
Golzari was born in Iran of Azerbaijani descent. He moved to England at the age of 15, where he studied Architecture with a focus on socioeconomic sustainability and inclusive cities.

== Publications, news and academic activities ==
- Golzari, N. (2015) 'Cultivating Possibilities' in Amiry, A. & Bshara, K. (Eds) Reclaiming Space: The 50 Village Project in rural Palestine. Ramallah, Riwaq.
- Fraser, M & Golzari, N. (2013) Architecture and Globalisation in the Persian Gulf Region. London, Ashgate.
- Golzari, N. (2013) Re-reading Affordable Technologies: Social practices and invisible technologies in sustainable design for the Middle East. PhD Thesis, University of Westminster.
- Palestine Sunbird Pavilion: International Architecture and Design Showcase, 2012
- "From Peckham to Palestine: lessons in building communities from the ground". The Guardian. 15 August 2011.
- Architecture, Settlement and Urban Identity of the Persian Gulf Region
- PART's contribution to Architecture As a Sign for Peace
- The architects building the Arab future
- PART's contribution to Virus, 'Designing Coexistence'
- Golzari, N., & Sharif, Y. (2011). 'Reclaiming Space and Identity: Heritage-led regeneration in Palestine', The Journal of Architecture, Vol. 16 (1), pp. 121–44.
