= Claude Friese-Greene =

British cinematographer (1898–1943)

Claude Friese-Greene (3 May 1898 – 6 January 1943; born Claude Harrison Greene) was a British-born cinema technician, filmmaker, and cinematographer, the son of William Friese-Greene. He shot over 60 films, mostly for other filmmakers, after making a few of his own in the 1920s. He developed his own colour processing technology, which he marketed through his company Spectrum Films, and was one of the first to shoot in Technicolor in Britain. He became more well-known in 2006, after his 1926 collection of films entitled The Open Road was screened on BBC Television.

== Early life and education ==
Born Claude Harrison Greene on 3 May 1898 in Fulham, London, he was the son of William Friese-Greene, a pioneer in early cinematography. He was the grandfather of musician and music producer Tim Friese-Greene.

== Colour cinematography ==
Claude's father William began the development of an additive colour film process called Biocolour. This process produced the illusion of true colour by exposing each alternate frame of ordinary black-and-white film stock through two different coloured filters. Each alternate frame of the monochrome print was then stained red or green. Although the projection of Biocolour prints did provide a tolerable illusion of true colour, like the more famous Kinemacolor process of George Albert Smith it suffered from noticeable colour flicker (a potentially headache-inducing defect known technically as "colour bombardment") and from red-and-green fringing around anything in the scene that moved very rapidly. In an attempt to overcome these problems, a faster-than-usual frame rate was used.

After the death of both of his parents in 1921, Friese-Greene continued to develop the system during the 1920s and renamed the process "All-British Friese-Greene Natural Colour Process" then the "Spectrum Colour Film process". He created a production company to market his technology, called Spectrum Films. He first created three short films: Moonbeam Magic, Dance of the Moods, and Quest of Colour (all 1924), and then began a larger project. He shot The Open Road between 1924 and 1926 with his assistant Robin Haworth-Booth, which was intended to be a series of ten-minute travel documentaries of Britain screened before the main feature in cinemas, primarily as a means of licensing the technology to other countries. They comprised footage of his road trip from Land's End to John o' Groats. However, his work had been superseded by the superior Technicolor process, so he abandoned the project. The films were donated to the National Film and Television Archive after his death.

He went on to be a highly-respected cinematographer on more than 60 other filmmakers' films, until his death in 1943. He was one of the first to shoot in Technicolor in Britain.

== Death and legacy ==
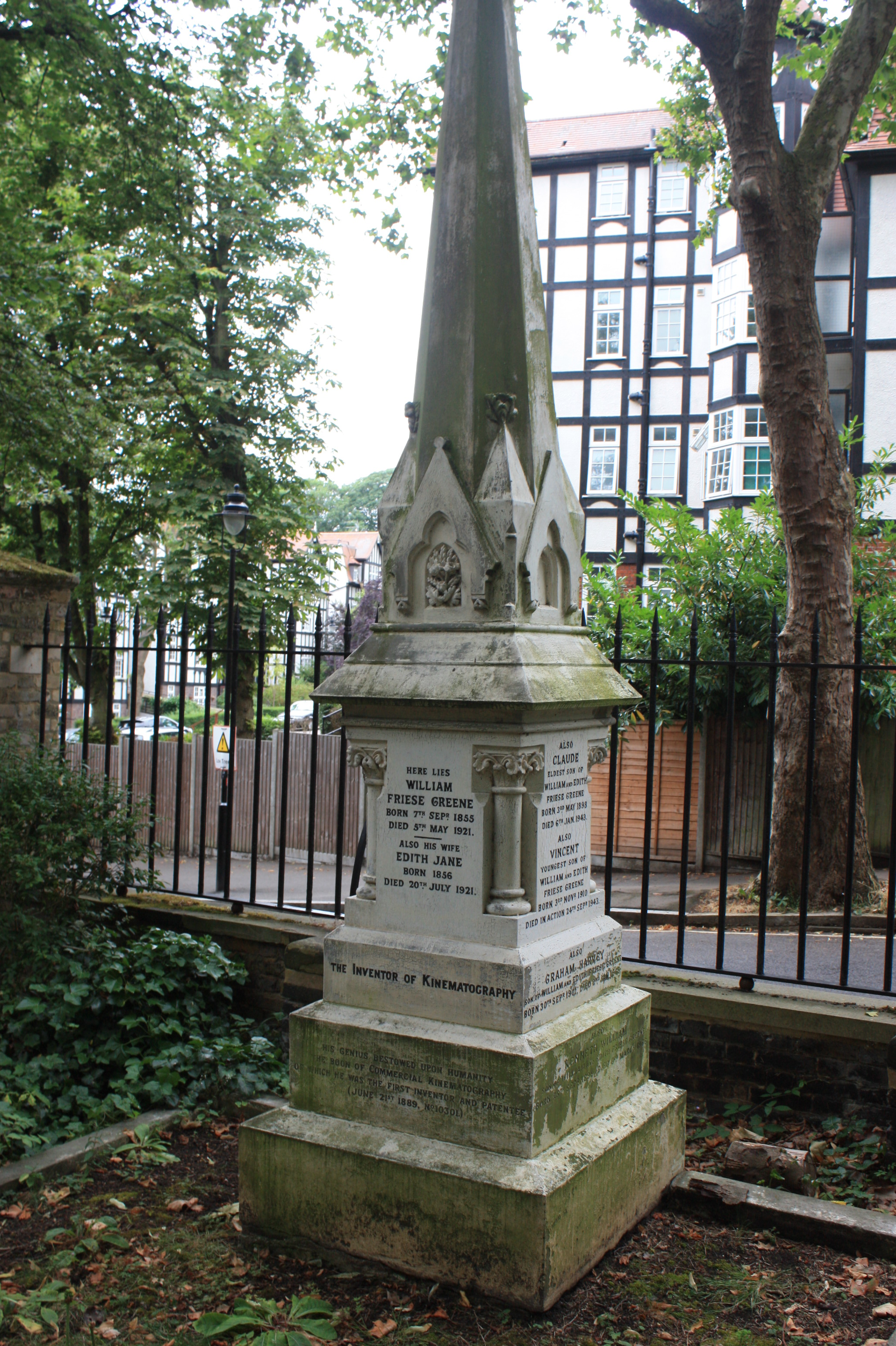
The Friese-Greene grave in Highgate Cemetery

Friese-Greene died as the result of an accident when filming at the Denham Film Studios on 6 January 1943. He is buried in Highgate Cemetery with his parents.

In 2006, the BBC ran a series of programmes called The Lost World of Friese-Greene. The three-part series, presented by Dan Cruickshank. and led to a greater appreciation of his pioneering work in the history of British colour cinematography. The British Film Institute used computer processing of the images to minimise the red and green fringes around rapidly moving objects in The Open Road.

== List of films in Spectrum Colour Film ==
- Dance of the Moods (1924) featuring modern dancer Margaret Morris
- Moonbeam Magic (1924)
- Quest of Colour (1924)
- The Open Road (1924–1926) restored by the British Film Institute 2005

== Selected filmography ==
- Moonbeam Magic (1924)
- Home at Last (1926)
- Tommy Atkins (1928)
- Widecombe Fair (1928)
- Under the Greenwood Tree (1929)
- A Romance of Seville (1929)
- Loose Ends (1930)
- The Middle Watch (1930)
- Uneasy Virtue (1931)
- The Flying Fool (1931)
- The Shadow Between (1931)
- Mr. Bill the Conqueror (1932)
- Fires of Fate (1932)
- For the Love of Mike (1932)
- A Southern Maid (1933)
- The Song You Gave Me (1933)
- Give Her a Ring (1934)
- Girls Will Be Boys (1934)
- The Luck of a Sailor (1934)
- Menace (1934)
- The Old Curiosity Shop (1934)
- No Monkey Business (1935)
- Music Hath Charms (1935)
- Invitation to the Waltz (1935)
- Drake of England (1935)
- Gypsy Melody (1936)
- Public Nuisance No. 1 (1936)
- Our Fighting Navy (1937)
- Star of the Circus (1938)
- Jane Steps Out (1938)
- Oh Boy! (1938)
- The Gang's All Here (1939)
- Murder in Soho (1939)
- Just like a Woman (1939)
- The Middle Watch (1940)
- The Flying Squad (1940)
- The Farmer's Wife (1941)
- Hard Steel (1942)
- The Great Mr. Handel (1942)
- Banana Ridge (1942)

== See also ==
- Color motion picture film
- List of color film systems
