= Living with the Future =

- Genre: Documentary
- Presented by: Simon Davis
- Original language: English

Living with the Future is a television documentary series first broadcast on 15 January 2007 on BBC Four. It is a follow-up series to Living with Modernism, also on BBC Four.

In each episode, presenter Simon Davis visits the owners of a private house, then stays overnight so he can comment on what the building is like to actually live in. The preceding series visited older "classic" buildings (1930s to 1970s) where modernity was the key feature. In this series, buildings have been constructed in the last few years and often rely on cutting-edge materials (the glass walls at "Skywood") and have "green" elements of re-use ("Quay House" is a rebuilt dairy) and efficiency ("Drop House" glazing and walls).

== Episode list ==
=== Skywood, Denham, Buckinghamshire ===
The family home of Graham Philips, chief executive of Foster and Partners. Simon discovers how to live in a geometrically pure cube where there are no door handles, light switches are hidden and the bedrooms are surrounded by curtains of glass. However, Graham's children may not be able to convince Simon that living in a concrete and glass box is as much fun for teenagers. Rectangular glass box, with floating roof set by an artificial lake, reminiscent of Mies van der Rohe's Barcelona Pavilion.

(architect/owner: Graham Phillips, chief executive of Foster and Partners)

=== Quay House, Peckham ===
A live/work space for an architectural practice, with integral art gallery in Peckham. Spends the weekend with Ken Taylor and his partner Julia Manheim who have taken the idea of working from home to a new level, as their architecture and design practice is in the middle of their house.

(architects: Quay2c)

=== Drop House, Potters Bar, Hertfordshire ===
A white rectilinear building with a large drop shape in its heart, set in a street of typical large suburban houses. Spends the weekend in a 21st Century suburban villa, in a new development of executive homes near Potters Bar in Hertfordshire. John and Bola Bolger wanted to escape from the confines of living in a Georgian reproduction and live a more modern life.

(architect: Hudson Featherstone)

=== Tilty Barn, Essex ===
A barn conversion for a family and their horse, featuring a stark white minimalist interior, flush fitting windows and stable. He visits an Essex barn conversion with a difference, owned by photographer Fi McGhee, who wanted a combination of traditional home with a modern interior for her children and her horse. Minimalist architect John Pawson oversaw the renovation of the 18th century barn and the interior design using a Japanese-inspired philosophy of pure simplicity along with swathes of concrete and glass.

(architect: John Pawson)

=== BV House / The Old Zoo, Lancashire ===
A large "modern country manor house" with separate children's/visitor's block, composed of many different angular forms and clad with thatched walls. He spends the weekend with Gerald and Linda Hitman, property developers who wanted the ultimate contemporary rural villa. They hired Iranian architects Farajadi and Farjadi to build The Old Zoo – a modern-day manor house on the side of the Ribble Valley in Lancashire. While the house is unashamedly modern it has a traditional twist, being clad entirely in thatch.

(architect: Farjadi Architects and owner)

=== Paxton House, North London ===
A family house built in spare space between mews houses – the most technologically advanced of the series. He is in north London to see the house of architects Richard and Heidi Paxton. Shoe-horned into a Victorian mews on the site of an old car workshop, the house is almost invisible from the street. The inside of the house, however, is high tech: a swimming pool in the living room, lighting and heating controlled by a central computer, and an enormous sliding glass roof that brings football stadium technology to a family home.

(architects: Richard Paxton and Heidi Locher)

== See also ==
- The Curious House Guest
