= Invasion (British TV series) =

- Genre: Documentary
- Directed by: Julian Birkett
- Presented by: Dan Cruickshank
- Voices of: Christopher Villiers
- Country of origin: United Kingdom
- Original language: English
- No. of seasons: 1
- No. of episodes: 3

Production
- Producer: Basil Comely; Edward Bazalgette; Julian Birkett; Tim Dunn
- Running time: 50 minutes

Original release
- Network: BBC Two
- Release: 28 October – 11 November 2001

Invasion is a BBC documentary series in which Dan Cruickshank examines attempts and plans to invade Britain and Ireland over the years by exploring coastal fortresses and defensive structures around the coast of the country to discover their military heritage. It was first broadcast on BBC Two in October 2001.

First aired on 28 October 2001, this three part series examines the portrayal of Britain as an impregnable self-sufficient island fortress and seeks to dispel this popular myth and provide an argument that Britain is a nation whose history is instead defined by the fear of invasion.

In episode one, Fortress Britain, Cruickshank visits the sites of some little-known invasion attempts. In episode two, The Bogeyman Is Coming, Cruickshank looks at Britain's response to the threat of French invasion by Napoleon's army in 1804. In the final episode, Battle for Britain, Cruickshank examines how Britain reinvented itself as a fortified encampment under the threat of German invasion during World War II.

== Companion book ==
- Cruickshank, Dan (12 October 2001). Invasion: Defending Britain from Attack. Boxtree Ltd. (hardcover). ISBN 978-0-7522-2029-1.
