= The Lost World of Tibet =

- BBC DVD Cover
- Genre: Documentary
- Directed by: Emma Hindley
- Presented by: Dan Cruickshank
- Starring: Dalai Lama
- Composer: Andrew Blaney
- Country of origin: United Kingdom
- Original language: English
- No. of episodes: 1

Production
- Producer: Emma Hindley
- Editor: Andrew Elliott
- Running time: 90 minutes

Original release
- Network: BBC Two
- Release: November 2006

Related
- The Lost World of Friese-Greene

The Lost World of Tibet is a BBC documentary film produced in conjunction with the British Film Institute. The 90-minute film was broadcast on BBC Two in November 2006.

The film is presented by Dan Cruickshank and features footage shot in Tibet prior to the 1950s with commentary from the Tenzin Gyatso, 14th Dalai Lama, and other people featured.

This is one of a number of BFI television series featuring footage from the BFI National Archive and produced in partnership with the BBC:

- The Lost World of Mitchell & Kenyon
- The Lost World of Friese-Greene
- The Lost World of Tibet
