= Deborah Cadbury =

British author, historian and television producer

- Education: Sussex University; Linacre College, Oxford
- Occupations: Author, historian, television producer
- Years active: 1978 – present
- Children: 2

Deborah Cadbury is a British author, historian and television producer with the BBC. She has won many international awards for her documentaries including an Emmy Award.

== Education ==
Cadbury graduated from Sussex University in Psychology and Linacre College, Oxford.

== Career ==
Cadbury joined the BBC in 1978 as a trainee. She went on to produce films for the BBC's Horizon strand and won awards for her investigations. Her Horizon film, Assault on the Male, launched a worldwide scientific research campaign into environmental oestrogens, hormone-mimicking chemicals potentially impacting human health, and led to her book, The Feminisation of Nature.

She moved into history programming in 2003 as the series producer of the BAFTA-nominated drama documentary series, Seven Wonders of the Industrial World. The series was notable for combining live action with CGI, created by Gareth Edwards, and was described as "a ground breaking achievement" by the Times. In 2005 she produced the docudrama series, Space Race, the BBC's first co-production between Russia and the United States with unique access to the Russian side of the story. As an executive producer, Cadbury continued her investigation of Cold War espionage in her BBC series Nuclear Secrets, which explored the race for supremacy through pivotal personal stories of such nuclear scientists as J. Robert Oppenheimer, Edward Teller, and Andrei Sakharov.

== Writing career ==
Cadbury wrote her first historical nonfiction in 2000 with The Dinosaur Hunters, which examined the bitter rivalry between the early fossil hunters who pieced together the evidence of a prehistoric world. This was turned into a TV drama by Granada Productions and, in 2001, won the Dingle Prize from the British Society for the History of Science. Her 2003 book The Lost King of France, telling the story of the French revolution through the eyes of a child, Marie Antoinette’s son, received a nomination for the Samuel Johnson Prize and was described by historian, Alison Weir, as ‘Absolutely stupendous. This is history as it should be’.

During the 2008 financial crisis, Deborah Cadbury examined her family history for her book, Chocolate Wars (2010), which unfolded the story of Cadbury from chocolate shop to the Kraft takeover. She coined the term ‘Quaker capitalism’ and she has given talks on the significance of this business heritage to INSEAD Business School, Birmingham and others. She is collaborating with Fable Films on a dramatization of the early chocolate pioneers.

More recently, she has written Princes at War (2015) exploring Britain's ‘finest hour’ through the escalating conflict between George V's four sons during the Second World War. Queen Victoria's Matchmaking (2017) examines Queen Victoria's role as a matchmaking grandmother and the remarkable vision of European unity that lay behind her schemes well before there was any notion of a ‘European Union’. The School That Escaped the Nazis (2022) tells the true story of Anna Essinger, a schoolteacher who smuggled her progressive school from Nazi Germany to England in 1933.

== Awards ==
Deborah Cadbury was awarded an Honorary Degree by the University of Birmingham in 2013. Nominations for her drama documentaries include: Broadcast, Royal Television Society and BAFTA.

== Major works (film) ==
=== Assault on the Male ===
Assault on the Male (1994), was a BBC documentary directed and produced by Cadbury, exploring the potential effect chemicals mimicking the female sex hormone oestrogen, by-products of industrial and consumer waste, were having on male humans and animals. Researchers interviewed in the film from the United States, Britain and Denmark linked these chemicals to declining sperm counts and sex mutations (e.g. abnormalities in alligator penises in Lake Apopka, Florida, testicular deformities in young boys in Scotland). The documentary, produced in association with the Discovery Channel, received an Emmy award.

=== Seven Wonders of the Industrial World ===
Dreams of Iron and Steel: Seven Wonders of the Nineteenth Century, from the building of the London Sewers to the Panama Canal is the companion book to this documentary.

=== Space Race ===
In 2005 she produced "Space Race" an award-winning Drama, the first BBC co-production between Russia and America.

Space Race: The Battle to Rule the Heavens is the companion book to this documentary.

== Major works (books) ==
=== The Feminization of Nature ===
Altering Eden: The Feminization of Nature (1997) explores further the themes introduced in Cadbury's film Assault on the Male regarding the effects of "a variety of man-made oestrogens, in chemicals, plastics, pesticides and medicines" on the environment and, particularly, their potential harm to "wildlife and human sexuality and reproductive capacity." In the book, Cadbury details interviews she conducted with scientists around the world and outlines the process of scientific investigation into how chemicals such as DDT, PCBs, alkyl phenols, bi-phenols, phthalates, and dioxins may be contributing to phenomenon such as increased breast cancer rates, decreased sperm counts, and abnormalities in male genital development whose full impact "has yet to be realized." However, scientists in the book caution that more evidence is needed to confirm the exact causes and effects of the phenomenon being observed. In their estimation, it is too early in the process to make definitive statements as to the dangers exposure to these chemicals have and at what levels cause risk to humans and wildlife.

=== The Dinosaur Hunters ===
In The Dinosaur Hunters, (2000), Cadbury examines the lives and discoveries of early nineteenth century fossil hunters. She starts with Mary Anning, who, at age 13, is credited with "uncovering the first whole fossil skeleton of an unknown creature" (later identified as an ichthyosaur). Cadbury also follows the careers of William Buckland, Gideon Mantell, and rival Richard Owen. Though Owen was recognized at the time for discovering the dinosaur, it was likely that Mantell's meticulous work in the field contributed greatly to Owen's ability to "prove a distinct genus of creatures". The book was turned into a film with the same name.

=== Dreams of Iron and Steel ===
Dreams of Iron and Steel: Seven Wonders of the Nineteenth Century, from the building of the London Sewers to the Panama Canal (2003), is Cadbury's bestselling book focusing on seven "heroic" projects that "left the world transformed in almost every way possible": Isambard Kingdom Brunel's SS Great Eastern, Robert Stevenson's Bell Rock Lighthouse, Washington Roebling's Brooklyn Bridge, the London sewers, the American transcontinental railroad, the Panama Canal, and the Hoover Dam (which, critics point out, was built starting in 1931, so was not a wonder of the nineteenth century).

"Each wonder illustrates the swiftly moving frontiers of technology and serves as a unique moment, a marker for what was known at the time. Taken together, the wonders illustrate progress by charting the frontiers of industrial knowledge and expertise...The changes are not linear; history is not about a smooth, even progression. There are enormous bursts of creative endeavor and change that reach out in unexpected directions until what was once barely possible becomes routine."

— Deborah Cadbury

=== The Lost King of France ===
The Lost King of France: How DNA Solved the Mystery of the Murdered Son of Louis XVI and Marie Antoinette (2003) tracks the life, and subsequent death in 1795, of Louis XVI and Marie Antoinette's son and heir, the Dauphin, Louis-Charles. The family was forced to leave Versailles during the storming of the palace and were imprisoned in the Tuileries. The Dauphin was separated from his parents and left to die in a prison cell, though it was rumored the child was somehow secretly saved and another child died in his place. At the request of Dutch historian Hans Petrie, genetic testing was conducted by Jean-Jacques Cassiman, head of molecular diagnostics at the Center for Human Genetics in Belgium to determine whether the child's heart (which had been preserved) and hair from Marie Antoinette's sister would be a familial match. The scientific testing put to rest any claims of imposters; the DNA strands were found to be identical. One reviewer wrote: "Emotionally gripping and beautifully constructed, this is history, science and gothic horror in one." The book is to be developed as a film by Lynda La Plante.

=== Chocolate Wars ===
"Chocolate Wars" starts with a brief history of early 19th century England when Quakers owned such companies as Wedgwood, Clarks, Bryant and May's, Huntley and Palmers and "helped shape the course of the Industrial Revolution" with a focus on product quality and wealth creation that funded social projects. It then focuses on the expansion of the chocolate business as new products were developed with Cadbury, Fry, Rowntree, Van Houten, Lindt, Nestlé, and Hershey all competing for global market shares. Despite its philanthropic roots, the Cadbury company itself (founded by the author's distant relatives, George and Richard Cadbury) is eventually taken over by Kraft. Chocolate Wars was second on The Christian Science Monitor's 2010 list of best nonfiction books.

=== Princes at War ===
Princes at War: The Bitter Battle Inside Britain's Royal Family in the Darkest Days of WWII tells the story of the interlocked and conflicted lives of King George V's four surviving sons, the Duke of Windsor, King George VI, the Duke of Gloucester, and the Duke of Kent during the abdication crisis and later on during World War II. The story focuses primarily on the two oldest brothers: Edward VIII, who purportedly betrayed his royal duty by "insisting on his right to marry" Wallis Simpson, and George VI, who was forced by Edward's actions to take up the responsibilities of being monarch. Cadbury's book "combines family drama against the backdrop of the war" which results in a telling of events "with deep sympathy to George VI". Cadbury vilifies Edward VIII and leaves open the question as to how close the Duke and Duchess of Windsor were to certain members of the Nazi Germany regime.

=== The School that Escaped the Nazis ===
The School That Escaped the Nazis is a non-fiction book that tells the true story of Anna Essinger, a schoolteacher who smuggled her progressive school from Nazi Germany to England in 1933. The book follows the challenges and triumphs of the school and its pupils, some of whom were Jewish orphans and survivors of the Holocaust. The book is based on letters, diaries, interviews, and testimonies from the former students, and offers a unique perspective on Nazi persecution and the Holocaust. The book was published in July 2022 by PublicAffairs.

== Filmography ==
- Cheating Time (BBC, 1993)
- The Estrogen Effect: Assault on the Male (BBC, 1993), producer
- Horizon, Too Close to the Sun (BBC, 1994), producer
- Twice Born (1995), writer & producer
- Horizon: Dawn of the Clone Age (1997), writer & producer
- Seven Wonders of the Industrial World (2003), series producer
- End Day (2005), executive producer
- Space Race (2005), series producer
- Nuclear Secrets (2007), executive producer
- In Search of Medieval Britain (2008), executive producer
- Inside the Medieval Mind (2008), executive producer
- Horizon titles include: Fast Life in the Food Chain, Cheating Time, Assault on the Male, Twice Born, Too Close to the Sun, The Gulf War Syndrome, Fat Cats & Thin Mice, The Human Laboratory and Dawn of the Clone Age.

== Personal life ==
Cadbury has two sons and lives in London.

== Bibliography ==
- Imagined Worlds, 1983, BBC Publications ISBN 978-0563203865
- The Feminisation of Nature, 1997, Penguin (UK) ISBN 978-0241137468, also published as Altering Eden: The Feminisation of Nature, St Martin's Press (US) ISBN 0-312-24396-0
- The Estrogen Effect: How Chemical Pollution Is Threatening Our Survival, 2000, St. Martin's Griffin, ISBN 978-0-312-26707-0
- The Dinosaur Hunters: A True Story of Scientific Rivalry and the Discovery of the Prehistoric World, 2001, HarperCollins (UK) ISBN 978-1857029635, also published as Terrible Lizard: The First Dinosaur Hunters and the Birth of a New Science, Holt/Macrae (US) ISBN 978-0805070873
- The Lost King of France, 2003, Fourth Estate (UK) ISBN 978-0007333790, St Martin's Press (US) ISBN 978-0312320294
- Seven Wonders of the Industrial World, 2003, Fourth Estate (UK) ISBN 978-0007163052, also published as Dreams of Iron and Steel, HarperCollins (US) ISBN 978-0007163069
- Space Race, 2005, Fourth Estate (UK), ISBN 978-0007209941, HarperCollins (US) ISBN 978-0007209958
- Chocolate Wars: The 150-Year Rivalry Between the World's Greatest Chocolate Makers, 2010, HarperCollins (UK) ISBN 978-0007325573, PublicAffairs (US) ISBN 978-1586488208, Douglas & McIntyre ISBN 978-1553655749 (Canada)
- Princes at War: The British Royal Family's Private Battle in the Second World War, 2015, Bloomsbury (UK) ISBN 978-1408845240, Public Affairs ISBN 978-1610394031 (US)
- Queen Victoria's Matchmaking: The Royal Marriages that Shaped Europe, 2017, Bloomsbury (UK) ISBN 978-1408852828 and Public Affairs (US) ISBN 978-1610398466
- The School that Escaped the Nazis, 2022, Public Affairs (US)
