= Jeremy Musson =

British writer, editor and presenter (born 1965)

Jeremy Musson (born London, 1965) is an English writer, editor and presenter, specialising in British country houses and architecture.

== Career ==
Musson was an architectural writer on Country Life magazine from 1995 to 1998, and its Architectural Editor from 1998 to 2007. He presented the BBC Two series The Curious House Guest (2005–6). He has been assistant historic building representative for the National Trust.

== Books ==
- The English Manor House
- 100 Period Details: Plasterwork
- How to Read a Country House. London: Ebury Press, ISBN 009190076X (2005)
- The Country Houses of John Vanbrugh: from the archives of Country Life. Aurum Press, ISBN 1-84513-097-9, ISBN 978-1-84513-097-8 (2008)
- English Country House Interiors (Rizzoli, 2011)
- The Country House Ideal (Merrell Publishing, 2015)
- Up and Down Stairs. London: John Murray ISBN 978-0-7195-9730-5 (2009)
- In Pursuit of the Best Gun: Westley Richards & Co. 1812-2012: a bicentennial history. Birmingham: Westley Richards & Co. ISBN 9780957108509 (2012)
- The Country House: past, present, future; David Cannadine & Jeremy Musson ISBN 9780847862726 New York: Rizzoli International (2018)
- Henbury Hall: An Extraordinary House (2019)
- Kelmscott Manor (Society of Antiquaries of London Paperback, 2022) ISBN 9780854313037
