= The Open Road (1926 film series) =

1926 travel film

- Directed by: Claude Friese-Greene
- Produced by: Claude Friese-Greene
- Cinematography: Claude Friese-Greene
- Release date: 1926
- Country: United Kingdom
- Languages: Silent; English intertitles

The Open Road is a 1926 British travel documentary film series narrating a journey by motorcar from Land's End to John O'Groats to explore life on 'the open road' across the United Kingdom. The Guardian has called it the "first comprehensive colour tourism film" of Britain.

The film, in part, was designed to market the additive two-colour film process originally developed by Claude Friese-Greene's father William, and then improved by Claude as the "new all-British Friese-Green natural colour process". The process renders colour by passing the light through a pair of red or blue-green filters, and then onto standard black-and-white film, alternating the filters every frame. When played back, the same alternating coloured filters are used to project in colour.

It features various famous British locations: Land's End, Cornwall, St Michael's Mount, St Ives, Torquay, Glasgow, Stirling, Oban, Edinburgh and London. It was filmed between 1924 and 1926.

Though it had some interest when previewed in 1925, it did not attain great success due to problems inherent to the colour processing, which produced colour fringing and flicker.

The original film was digitally restored in 2005 by the BFI, who have the original negatives on file. The footage in the archive was compiled into a 65-minute film from the original 26 parts, and was made available to watch within the UK online free of charge. A new film score (to the originally silent film) was produced by composer and pianist Neil Brand and violinist Günther Buchwald to accompany the DVD release.

== Cast ==
- Claude Friese-Greene
