= Seven Wonders of the Industrial World =

- BBC DVD cover
- Genre: Documentary; Docudrama; History
- Written by: Paul Bryers; Gregory Evans; Mark Everest; Tony Mulholland; Christopher Spencer; Paul Wilmshurst; Rachel Wright
- Directed by: Paul Bryers; Mark Everest; Christopher Spencer; Paul Wilmshurst; Ed Bazalgette
- Starring: Ron Cook; Steven Berkoff; George Anton; Robert Cavanah; Robert Young; John Guerrasio; Mark McGann; John Walters; Jay Benedict
- Narrated by: Robert Lindsay
- Composer: Steve Jablonsky
- Country of origin: United Kingdom
- Original language: English
- No. of episodes: 7

Production
- Producers: Jill Fullerton-Smith; Deborah Cadbury
- Cinematography: Mike Spragg; Chris Titus King
- Editors: Darren Jonusas; Elliott McCaffrey; Rick Aplin
- Running time: 50 minutes

Original release
- Release: 4 September – 16 October 2003

Related
- What the Industrial Revolution Did for Us

Seven Wonders of the Industrial World is a 7-part British docudrama television miniseries that originally aired from 4 September 2003 to 16 October 2003 on BBC and was later released on DVD. The programme examines seven engineering feats that occurred since the Industrial Revolution. The same feats are covered in a companion book of the same name by producer Deborah Cadbury.

== Production ==
The programmes were dramatised versions of actual events: actors played the various figures involved, reciting monologues and dialogue based on their letters and writings. It cost approximately £1 million to create the 7-part documentary. A book of the same name was released by producer Deborah Cadbury, exploring the same feats.

== Awards ==
- 2004 British Academy Television Awards
  - Nominated: Huw Wheldon Award for Factual Series or Strand
- 2004 British Academy Television Craft Awards
  - Nominated: Best Photography (Factual): Mike Spragg
- RTS Television Awards 2004
  - Nominated: Best Production Design (Entertainment & Non Drama)
  - Nominated: Best Science & Natural History

== The list ==
Wonder	Description	Completed
SS Great Eastern	British oceangoing passenger steamship	1858
Bell Rock Lighthouse	In the North Sea off the coast of Angus, Scotland	1810
Brooklyn Bridge	In New York City, New York, United States	1883
London sewer system	Serving London, England	1870
First transcontinental railroad	1,912-mile (3,077 km) continuous railroad line connecting existing rail networks in Iowa, Nebraska, Wyoming, Utah, Nevada, and California in the United States	1869
Panama Canal	51-mile (82 km) artificial waterway crossing the Isthmus of Panama and connecting the Atlantic and Pacific oceans	1914
Hoover Dam	On the Colorado River, spanning the border between Nevada and Arizona in the United States	1936

== Episodes ==
=== The Great Ship ===
This episode focuses on the construction of the SS Great Eastern, designed by Isambard Kingdom Brunel to be both the first ship entirely made out of iron and the most luxurious vessel of the day. However, while the ship herself was a marvel of shipbuilding, her construction was marred by accidents, scandal and misfortune, including a fire that practically destroyed the shipbuilder's yard, problems with the launch and financial scandals, all of which contributed towards Brunel's deteriorating health and comparatively early demise in 1859 and the popular belief that the ship was jinxed (a rumour leading to the legend of two bodies being found trapped in the hull upon her scrapping).

=== The Brooklyn Bridge ===
Focusing on the construction of the Brooklyn Bridge, the episode examines the family that built it—John Augustus Roebling, who designed the bridge; his son, Washington Roebling, who took over construction following his father's death shortly after the project was announced; and Washington's wife Emily Roebling, who taught herself engineering principles and took on the burden of her husband's work after his health was destroyed by the decompression sickness he suffered, owing to the length of time he spent working and overseeing matters in the pressured atmosphere of the underwater caissons used to build the bridge.

=== Bell Rock Lighthouse ===
This episode tells the story of the construction in the early 19th century of the offshore lighthouse on Bell Rock, by the Scottish engineer Robert Stevenson. Bell or Inchcape Rock was underwater except for a couple of hours at low tide each day. It had claimed the lives of sailors and sunk ships for hundreds of years, but its situation caused difficulties in producing a design that would stand up to the storms and waves that ravaged the area while simultaneously housing the builders who worked on it during the few months of fair weather available each year.

=== The Sewer King ===
Set in London during the 1850s, this episode focusses on the construction of the London sewerage system, built to replace the antiquated medieval system that was overworked and inadequate for the needs of the then-largest metropolis in the world, causing epidemics of disease and a permanent foul stench to fill the air also known as the Great Stink. The episode follows the efforts and work of Joseph Bazalgette, the brilliant engineer who designed the influential and modern sewer system that would purify the city, transform the streets above and would result in the end of the epidemics of cholera and typhoid that had ravaged the population—although, ironically not for the reasons that he initially thought. (This episode was written by Gregory Evans and directed and produced by Bazalgette's great-great-grandson, Edward Bazalgette)

=== The Panama Canal ===
This episode presents the French and American efforts to build a canal through Panama to link the Atlantic Ocean with the Pacific Ocean. The first attempt to construct the canal by Ferdinand de Lesseps, the builder of the Suez Canal, was abandoned because of tropical diseases (which killed over 22,000 men) and the difficulty of constructing a sea-level canal through the mountains. The resulting financial scandals not only ruined de Lesseps and many investors, it also brought down the French government. The episode then takes up the story seventeen years later when the United States took up the challenge. A concentrated effort succeeded in eradicating the causes of the tropical diseases, but the attempt to build a sea-level canal once again failed. Instead the canal was built with locks.

=== The Line ===
The episode follows the construction of the First transcontinental railroad, the first transcontinental rail system, which would unite the eastern and western seaboards of the United States. Started in Sacramento by a consortium of local shopkeepers with no experience in building a railroad, the episode follows their efforts to build from west to east through the forbidding Sierra Nevada mountains with the help of Chinese labourers whilst simultaneously following the efforts of the workers of the Union Pacific to build from east to west, and their problems in dealing with the lawless nature of the Wild West, attacks by hostile Indians, and financial corruption and scandal.

=== The Hoover Dam ===
The final episode focuses on the construction of the Hoover Dam during the Great Depression of the 1930s, focusing in particular on the ruthless pace set by Frank Crowe, the builder, whose eagerness to complete the project well before schedule and subsequent exploitation of the workforce (who were desperate for any employment and were forced to accept conditions of extreme hardship in the process) resulted in many deaths and the eventual construction of a new city to house the workers.

== Media information ==
=== DVD release ===
DVD Region	Release date	Publisher
Region 2	3 January 2005	BBC Video
Region 4	6 February 2008	BBC Video

=== Companion book ===
- Cadbury, Deborah (26 August 2003). Seven Wonders of the Industrial World. Fourth Estate (hardcover). ISBN 978-0-00-716304-5.
- Cadbury, Deborah (5 July 2004). Seven Wonders of the Industrial World. HarperPerennial (paperback). ISBN 978-0-00-716305-2.

== See also ==
- Wonders of the World
