= What the Industrial Revolution Did for Us =

- Genre: Documentary
- Directed by: Simon Baker; Jonathan Hassid; Billie Pink
- Presented by: Dan Cruickshank
- Country of origin: United Kingdom
- Original language: English
- No. of series: 1
- No. of episodes: 6

Production
- Producers: Patricia Wheatley; Stephen Haggard; Jonathan Stamp
- Running time: 23 minutes

Original release
- Network: BBC Two
- Release: 7 October – 11 November 2003

Related
- Seven Wonders of the Industrial World

What the Industrial Revolution Did for Us is a BBC documentary series produced in conjunction with the Open University that examines the impact of the Industrial Revolution on modern society. It was originally broadcast on BBC Two from 7 October to 11 November 2003.

== Reception ==
=== Ratings ===
- Episode one this episode produced the lowest ratings of the series.(2003-10-07): 2.6 million viewers.
- Episode four (2003-10-28): 2.4 million viewers.

== Episodes ==
=== Episode one: Material World ===
By the early 18th century the British had become, well, very materialistic, they craved exotic goods, sugar, porcelain, fine cotton, but it was tea that particularly took their fancy. Mid-18th century people of taste liked nothing more than to sip this Oriental import sweetened with Caribbean sugar, they drank from the finest Chinese porcelain and dressed in Indian cottons including calicos and chintzes, this was the good life and everyone wanted a taste. How this dream became a reality is one of the most fascinating adventures in British history.

— Dan Cruickshank

Cruickshank travels around Britain to introduce the idea and inventions of the Industrial Revolution that created the modern material world.

- Iron masters such as Abraham Darby I and John Iron Mad Wilkinson laid the foundations of modern metallic constructions.
- The atmospheric engine built by Thomas Newcomen to pump water from the mines powered the Industrial Revolution.
- Plantations conceived by Joseph Banks in New Zealand and Australia with James Cook sowed the seeds of the global economy.
- Mechanisation emerged in the cotton industry from John Kay's flying shuttle and James Hargreaves’ spinning jenny.
- China clay discovered by William Cookworthy allowed British potters to create the first British porcelain.
- Mass production emerged from all these innovations bringing the good life of the elite to the masses.

=== Episode two: Working Wonders ===
In the middle of the 18th century Britons made there living by one means above all, farming, as they always had done. However Britain was about to undergo the most profound social change in its history, a change that would affect and define us all. In the space of just 60 years Britain would experience a revolution, a revolution which would take the worker out of the country and into the city, out of rural economy and into urban factories. This is the story of the machines and people that for better or worse created our modern world of work.

— Dan Cruickshank

Cruickshank travels around Britain to introduce the idea and inventions of the Industrial Revolution that created the features of modern working life.

- Innovations in agriculture allowed farmers to produce enough food to allow the expanding population to flourish.
- Civil engineering emerged from the experiments in waterwheel efficiencies undertaken by John Smeeton.
- The steam engine was developed from the Newcombe engine by James Watt and Matthew Boulton in the first international corporation.
- The letter copying press developed by Watt to deal with the mass of paper work at this business was the original photocopier.
- The division of labour discussed by Adam Smith led to the production line developed by Bolton in early management consultancy.
- The Jacquard loom of Joseph Marie Jacquard programmed with punch cards was the forerunner of the modern computer.

=== Episode three: On the Move ===
By the middle of the 18th century the only way to get around Britain was pulled by a horse, but it wasn’t as much fun as it might look. If it had been then passengers might not have been referred to as the martyrs of the highway. There were potholes big enough to drown in, highwaymen were a constant threat and the carriages themselves were heavy and lumbering boneshakers that made passengers sick as they juddered along the road.

— Dan Cruickshank

Cruickshank travels around Britain to introduce the idea and inventions of the Industrial Revolution that created the features of modern transportation.

- The elliptical spring of Obadiah Eliott revolutionised carriage design with the first suspension.
- A national road network constructed by John Loudon McAdam and Thomas Telford opened up the country to trade and travel.
- The suspension bridge constructed by Telford across the Menai Strait was the most ambitious in the world.
- The wind powered charvolant of George Pocock opened people's eyes to forms of power other than the horse.
- The high-pressure steam engine of Richard Trevithick powered the first steam carriage and railway locomotive.
- The Rocket of George & Robert Stephenson was the first self-propelled machine to outpace a galloping horse.
- The first aeroplane design and crewed flight came out of George Cayley's study of aerodynamics.

=== Episode four: Modern Medicine ===
In the mid-18th century Britons had one overriding personal concern, their health, with good reason, average life expectancy was 36 years. People generally treated themselves based on little more than superstition, magic and hearsay. There were trained doctors but without an accurate way to diagnose or cure illness your chances were limited.

— Dan Cruickshank

Cruickshank travels around Britain to introduce the idea and inventions of the Industrial Revolution that created the features of modern medicine.

- Modern medicine emerged from William Withering's scientific study of traditional folk remedies.
- The ventilator of Stephen Hales helped to reduce airborne diseases with the first air-conditioning.
- Dephlogisticated air discovered by Joseph Priestley in experiments with a giant lens was later renamed Oxygen.
- Vaccinations were developed by Edward Jenner from his observation of milkmaids to fight Smallpox.
- The stethoscope of René Laennec allowed Charles Thackerer to examine the effects of industry on workers' health.
- The Anatomy Act allowed doctors like William Hunter make huge advancements in understanding the human body.

=== Episode five: War Machine ===
Until the Industrial Revolution battles were normally won on lost according to the training and discipline of the soldiers. After nearly 10 years of fighting the French and the British were pretty evenly matched and deadlocked. If Britain was to win it needed new tactics and new technology, it was time for a change.

— Dan Cruickshank

Cruickshank travels around Britain to introduce the idea and inventions of the Industrial Revolution that created the features of modern warfare.

- The riflemen were the first to wear green as camouflage and taught to use their initiative.
- Rifling was used on the Baker rifle by Ezekiel Baker] to increase distance and accuracy.
- The mechanised production line of Marc Brunel and Henry Maudslay revolutionised industry.
- The first mass-produced precision-made object with interchangeable-parts was the Enfield rifle.
- The torpedo delivered by the Turtle of David Bushnell was the beginning of submarine warfare.
- The boring machine of John Iron Mad Wilkinson revolutionised the casting of cannons and the steam engine.
- Wrought-iron was used for the iron-hulled HMS Warrior and its rifled Armstrong Guns.

=== Episode six: City Living ===
During the Industrial Revolution Britain’s economy had begun to boom, to keep it booming the City of London needed a whole new set of financial machinery. The Bank of England was already in place, the Stock Exchange got going in 1773, and in 1771 Lloyds underwriters established their own premises just down the road. So the city as we know had started to emerge, and these new commercial mechanisms needed a new type of worker to operate them, these workers became the backbone of the emerging middle-class.

— Dan Cruickshank

Cruickshank travels around Britain to introduce the idea and inventions of the Industrial Revolution that created the features of modern city life.

- Standardised house construction with integrated services were created by architects of the Westend housing boom like Thomas Cubitt.
- High-pressure water from cast-iron pipes specified in the 1817 Metropolitan Paving Act led to the modern bathroom.
- Consumer choice emerged through the flat fascias and plate glass windows of the arcades and parades of modern shop fronts.
- Marketing emerged from the catalogues, hoardings and door-to-door salesmen of Josiah Wedgwood and Thomas Bentley.
- The steam press of Friedrich Koenig and Andreas Friedrich Bauer allowed The Times to dramatically increase circulation.
- Interior design emerged from the new brightly coloured dyes such as the chrome yellow of Louis Vauquelin.

== Companion book ==
- Weightman, Gavin (16 October 2003). What the Industrial Revolution Did for Us. BBC Books (hardcover). ISBN 978-0-563-48794-4.
