= The Lost World of Mitchell & Kenyon =

- Genre: Documentary
- Directed by: Emma Hindley
- Presented by: Dan Cruickshank
- Starring: Bertie Carvel; Ben Bishop
- Composer: Andrew Blaney
- Country of origin: United Kingdom
- Original language: English
- No. of episodes: 3

Production
- Running time: 60 minutes

Original release
- Network: BBC One
- Release: 14 January 2005

Related
- The Lost World of Friese-Greene

The Lost World of Mitchell & Kenyon is a BBC documentary series produced in conjunction with the British Film Institute. Three one-hour episodes were broadcast on BBC One in January 2005 and released on Region 2 DVD soon after. The episodes are titled as follows:

1. Life and Times
2. Sport and Pleasure
3. Saints and Sinners

The series showcases films made by Mitchell and Kenyon, lost for almost a century, rediscovered in 1994 and restored by the BFI. Most of the films are records of life, sport and culture at the beginning of the 20th century.

Dan Cruickshank presents and narrates the series; in addition, descendants of some of the people featured in the original films provide commentaries upon them; and scenes from the life and work of filmmakers Sagar Mitchell and James Kenyon are dramatized in speeded-up form like incorrectly screened silent movies (although the actual film excerpts are shown at the correct speed).

The series is notable for being shot in 4:3 format to match the films' original aspect ratio, unlike many modern documentary series which crop all non-widescreen footage into 16:9.

This is one of a number of BFI television series featuring footage from the BFI National Archive and produced in partnership with the BBC:

- The Lost World of Mitchell & Kenyon
- Mitchell & Kenyon in Ireland
- The Lost World of Friese-Greene
- The Lost World of Tibet
