= The Lost World of Friese-Greene =

- Genre: Documentary
- Directed by: Annabel Hobley
- Presented by: Dan Cruickshank
- Composer: Andrew Blaney
- Country of origin: United Kingdom
- Original language: English
- No. of seasons: 1
- No. of episodes: 3

Production
- Producers: Simon Ford; Emma Hindley; Annabel Hobley
- Editors: Malcolm Daniel; Fred Hart
- Running time: 60 minutes

Original release
- Network: BBC Two
- Release: 18 April – 2 May 2006

Related
- The Lost World of Mitchell & Kenyon; The Lost World of Tibet

The Lost World of Friese-Greene is a BBC documentary series produced in conjunction with the British Film Institute. Three one-hour episodes were broadcast on BBC Two in spring 2006.

The series, presented by Dan Cruickshank, retraces a road trip that Claude Friese-Greene took between 1924 and 1926 from Land's End to John o' Groats. It also showcases The Open Road, a 26-reel film made by Friese-Greene along the way. The Open Road was filmed using the Biocolour process originally invented by his father William Friese-Greene, the moving picture pioneer, later developed further by Claude after his father's death.

The Open Road was donated to the BFI National Archive by Friese-Greene's son in the 1950s and the job of restoration and explanation took several decades. The British Film Institute used computer processing of the images to minimise the red and green fringes around rapidly moving objects.

According to Dan Cruickshank, the purpose of recreating Friese-Greene's journey was "to see what has changed in Britain in the last 80 years and, perhaps more intriguingly, to see what remains the same. There's also a bit of a detective story, a quest for knowledge, because very little is known about the archive and about the people that appear in it."

This is one of a number of BFI television series featuring footage from the BFI National Archive and produced in partnership with the BBC:

- The Lost World of Mitchell & Kenyon
- The Lost World of Friese-Greene
- The Lost World of Tibet

In 2013, a clip from the series went viral after it was set to the music from Amelie and British band Jonquil. The clip, dubbed "London in 1927" was posted by several news sites and retweeted by Kevin Spacey.

== See also ==
- List of early color feature films
