= Richard Paxton =

Richard Lauderdale Paxton (born 21 May 1956 in Cosford, Shropshire; died London 20 March 2006), was an English architect, largely working in London.

== Life and work ==
Paxton was one of four children of a Royal Air Force officer and spent his childhood travelling around the world, Malaysia in particular. He attended Brighton, Hove and Sussex Grammar School, followed by architecture school at Kingston Polytechnic.

After graduating, Paxton worked for Ahrends, Burton & Koralek. In 1985 he established the practice of Paxton Locher, with Heidi Locher (whom he married in 1987). He supplemented their income with part-time teaching at Kingston and the Bartlett School in London. The practice worked on a number of house projects in London, including a revamp of the home of author Douglas Adams.

In 1996 the practice won a commission to design the new Soho Theatre. Their design incorporated a redundant synagogue as the theatre auditorium. It opened in 2000.

Richard Paxton died in London on 20 March 2006, aged 49, on the verge of completing a low-energy house project in Hampstead, where he planned to celebrate his 50th birthday.

Paxton designed homes featured on BBC Four's Living with the Future (aired on 15 January 2007 in the UK) and Channel 4's Grand Designs (aired on 2 April 2008 in the UK).
