= Living with Modernism =

Living with Modernism is a television documentary series first broadcast on BBC Four in 2006. It is a companion series to Marvels of the Modern Age on BBC Two, and was followed by a sister series Living with the Future in 2007. In each of six episodes, presenter Simon Davis visits a private family house designed by an architect associated with the modern movement.

== Episode list ==
=== 29a Loom Lane, Radlett, Hertfordshire ===
This episode looks at the family home of George Marsh which he designed for his own family to leave in. He was the architect behind one of London's earlier tall buildings, Centrepoint. Loom Lane, a distinctive building with an extraordinary paraboloid roof. Simon stays with Marsh's family to discover what life is like living in the house.

(architect: George Marsh)

=== The Firs, Hampstead ===
Designed in the late 50s by one of the lesser known but respected British architect, Patrick Gwynne. The house now is the family home of William and Sharon Sargent. Simon spends a weekend with them to learn more about Gwynne and his design. The weekend culminates in a relaxed garden party.

(architect: Patrick Gwynne)

=== Brackenfell, Cumbria ===
Designed by Sir John Leslie Martin and Sadie Speight, who later married in 1934. Martin, who was a leading advocate of the International Style with his most famous building being the Royal Festival Hall. Brackenfell, built for textile designer and artist Alastair Morton, MD of Edinburgh Weavers.The interior colour scheme was reputedly designed by Ben Nicholson who lived locally. It now has Grade II listed status. The house hasn't exactly weathered well, as it shows signs of its age, with parts of the concrete structure having rotted away.

(architects: Leslie Martin and Sadie Speight)

=== 16, Kevock Road, Lasswade, Edinburgh ===
Stella and David Rankin originally bought their house for the garden, only to discover later that they had also purchased one of Scotland's finest modernist houses. Simon brings one of the architects back to the house for the first time in forty years. Kevock Road the brainchild of both Morris and Steedman, this steel and glass building located near Edinburgh is a mesmerising example of modern living. It was one of Scotland's first modernist constructions, built at the top of a valley.

(architects: James Morris and Robert Steedman)

=== "Stillness", Sundridge Park, Bromley, Kent ===
Designed in 1934 by Gilbert Booth, its a leading example of Art Deco architecture. With its 56 ft roof terrace, private landscaped garden and octagonal outdoor swimming pool. Thanks to a painstaking restoration undertaken by the present owners, the house stands much as it did in the 1930s. Recently assigned a Grade II listing, the five-bedroom property captures much of the elegance of a period many associate with pre-war Paris and the skyscrapers of Manhattan. After the programme was made, came onto the market at an asking price of over £1,295,000.

(architect: Gilbert Booth, 1934)

=== Capel Manor House, Kent ===
The last in the series sees Simon visiting a wonderful 900 sq. foot steel-supported glass pavilion by Michael Manser, a former Riba president.

(architect: Michael Manser, 1972)

== See also ==
- The Curious House Guest
