= A History of Architecture =

Reference book on architectural history

A History of Architecture on the Comparative Method
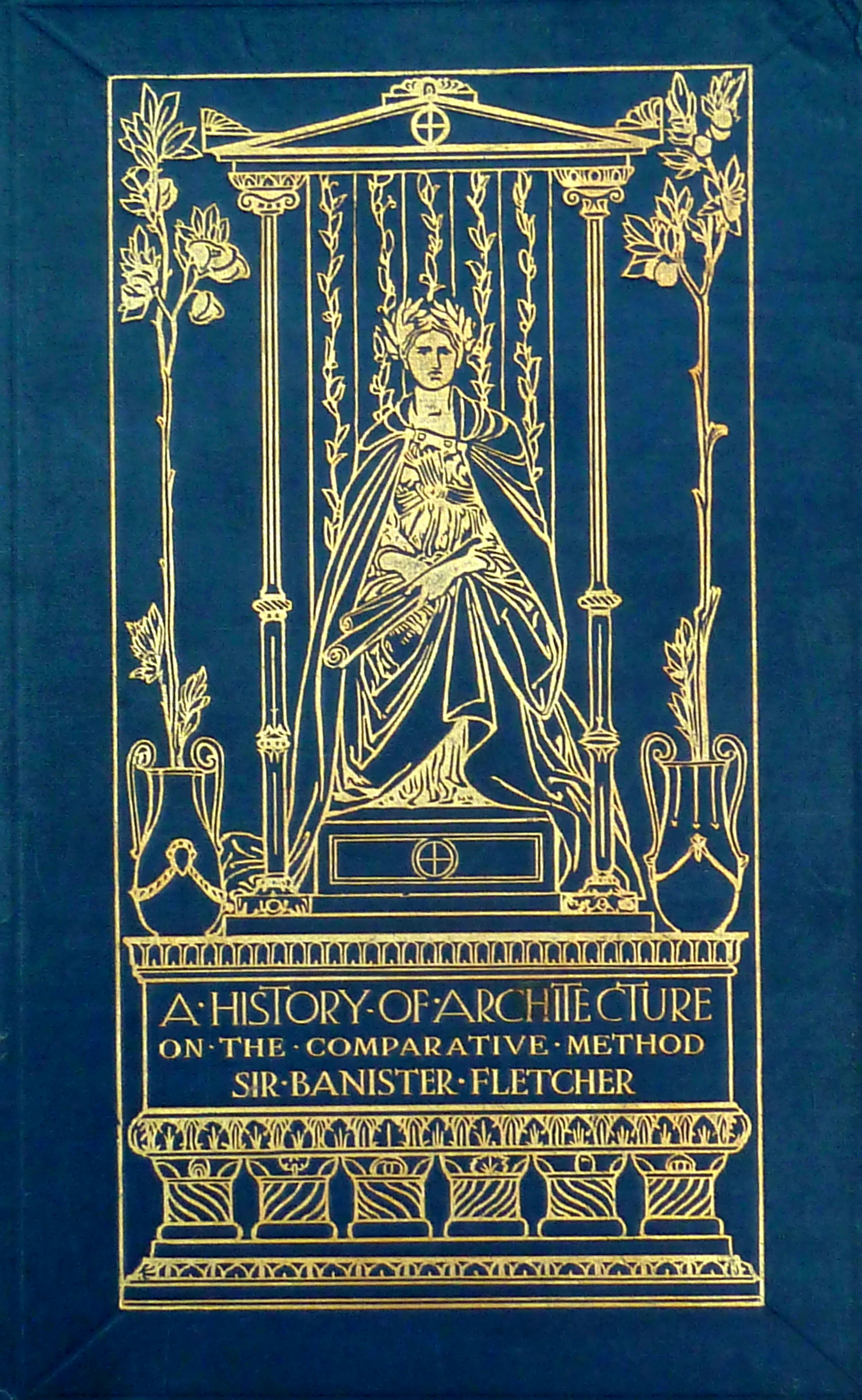
- Author: Banister Flight Fletcher and Banister Fletcher
- Published: 1896
- Text: A History of Architecture on the Comparative Method at Wikisource

A History of Architecture on the Comparative Method is a book about history of architecture by Banister Flight Fletcher and his father, Banister Fletcher, published in London in 1896. The book became a standard reference work, with updated editions published throughout the 20th century. The latest, 21st edition, was published in 2019.

== Editions ==
Murray Fraser wrote in his review about different editions:

The first edition was steeped in late-Victorian myths of empire. It covered nothing outside Europe and the (ancient) Middle East. The 4th edition (1901) added some other architectural traditions under the dismissive title of "The Non-Historical Styles". Non-Western architecture was likewise caricatured as the stunted lower branches on the "Tree of Architecture" included in the 5th and 6th editions (1905 and 1921). This attitude was partially tackled by later General Editors, and a centenary 20th edition was published in 1996 under Dan Cruickshank, yet their good intentions did little to resolve the fundamental problem. A fully post-colonial reworking planned by John McKean in the mid-2000s never happened, and post-colonialism itself has since been absorbed into broader concepts of globalisation.

=== 20th-century editions ===
There was a major revision with the 6th edition in 1921, when much of the text was rewritten by Banister Flight Fletcher and his first wife. This was over twenty years after his father's death, and for this edition, his father's name was dropped, and the numerous drawings were replaced by new ones by George G. Woodward and others. According to J. Mordaunt Crook, this edition concentrated "on supplying an epitomised history of world architecture" such that "Fletcher turned a useful handbook into a veritable student's bible". Fletcher produced the sixteenth edition shortly before his death in 1953.

A centenary 20th edition edited by Dan Cruickshank was produced in 1996.

=== 21st-century editions ===
The 21st edition was published in 2019, edited by Murray Fraser and Catherine Gregg, under the sponsorship of the RIBA. Retitled as Sir Banister Fletcher's Global History of Architecture, it aims to correct the historical western-centric imbalance of the content, which has been tackled by earlier editions, but not eradicated. The RIBA claims that the expanded edition, written by 88 experts from around the world, represents the most comprehensive survey of global architecture to date. In a review of the new edition, Preeti Chopra writes that "Banister Fletcher's Global History uses as its starting point 3500 BCE, commonly accepted as the beginning of the 'urban revolution', and concludes with the present day. A neutral framework divides the volumes into seven parts covering sequential and broad periods that unfold in linear time without focusing on particular historical events or favouring particular regions. ... Acknowledging that this edition bears only some 'traces' of the original works, Fraser defends the use of Sir Banister Fletcher's name in the title by affirming that 'just as no man is an island, nothing stands anew'."

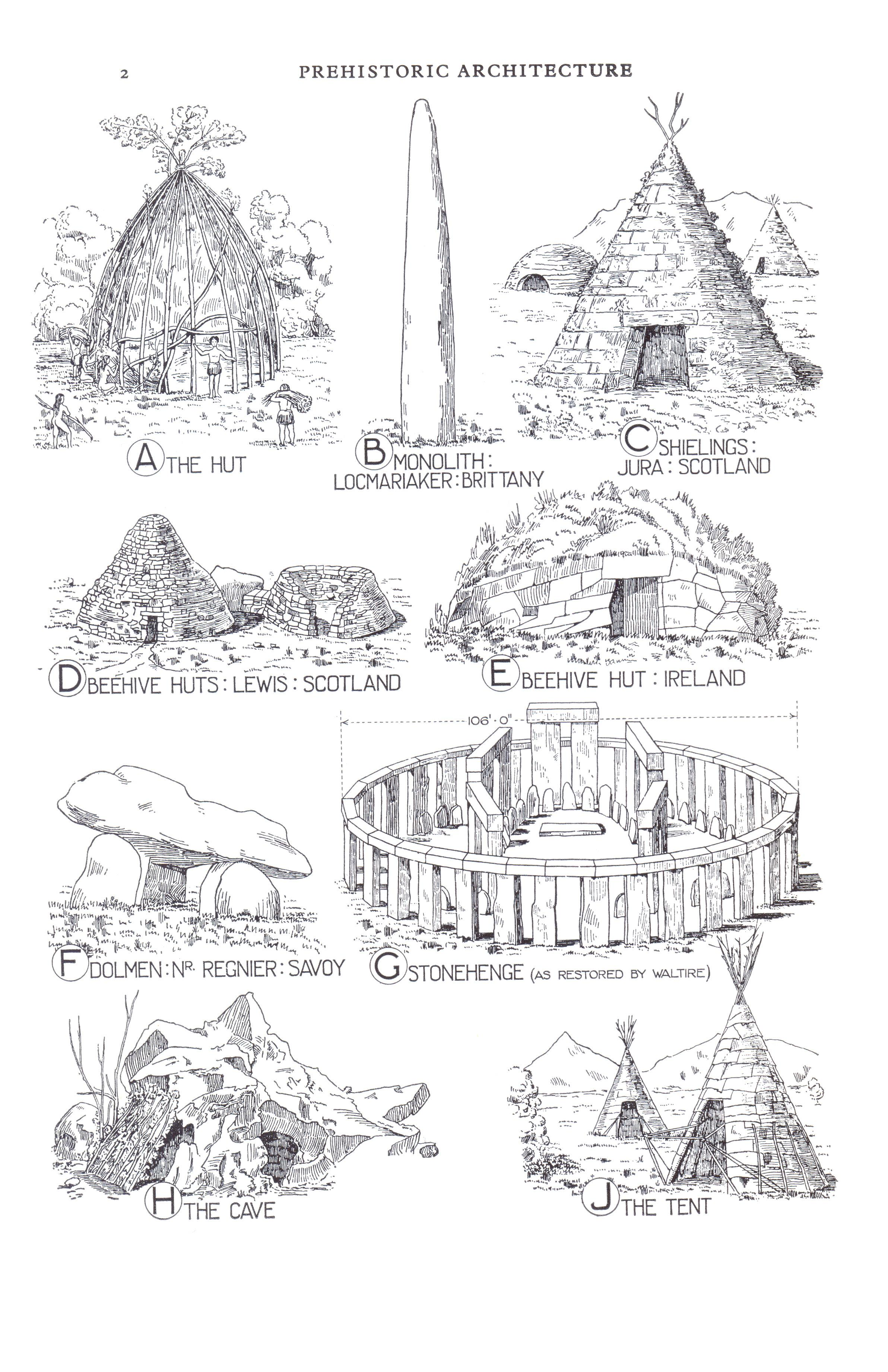
Prehistoric architecture. 17th ed.

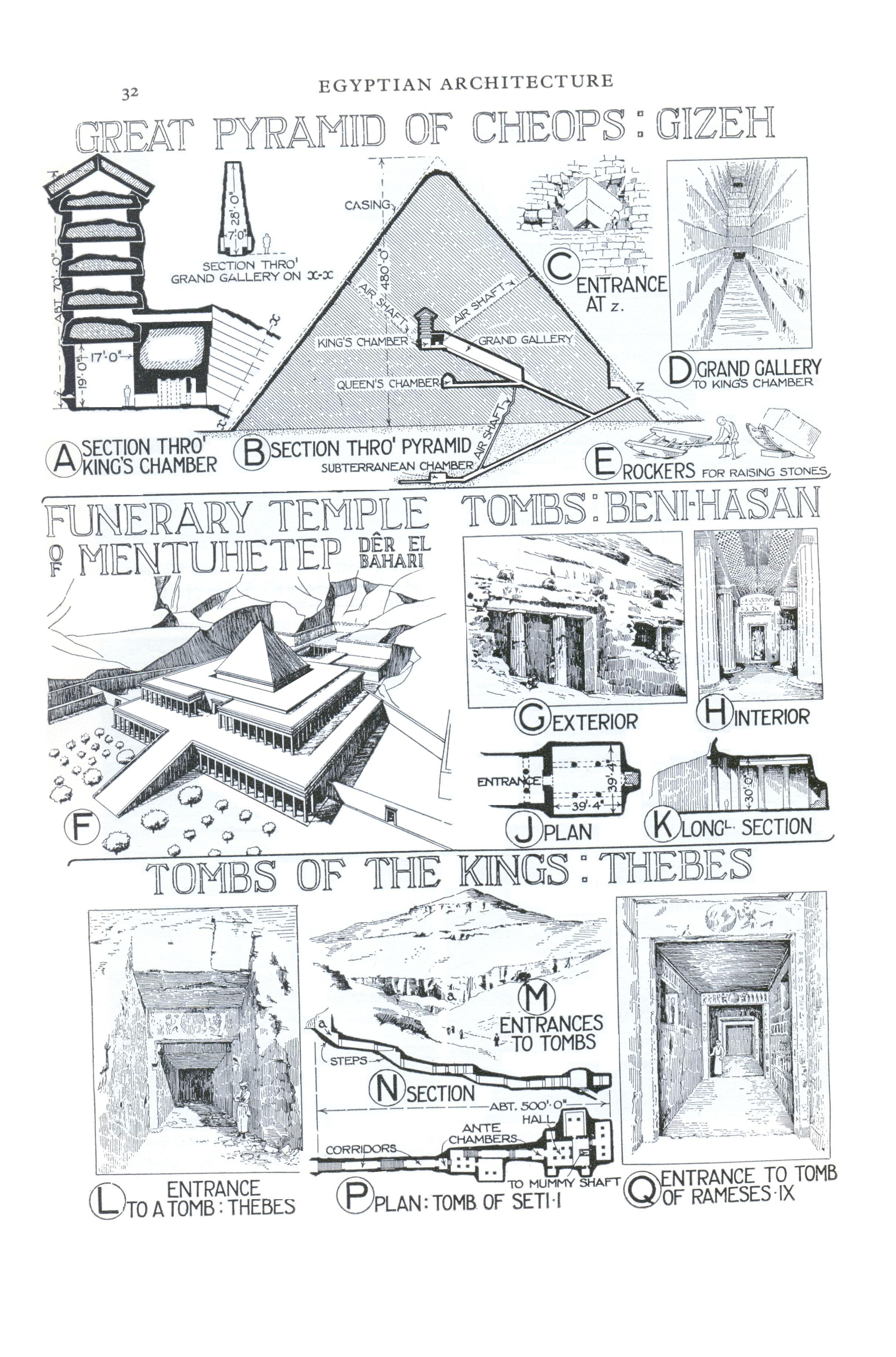
Great Pyramid of Cheops. 17th ed.

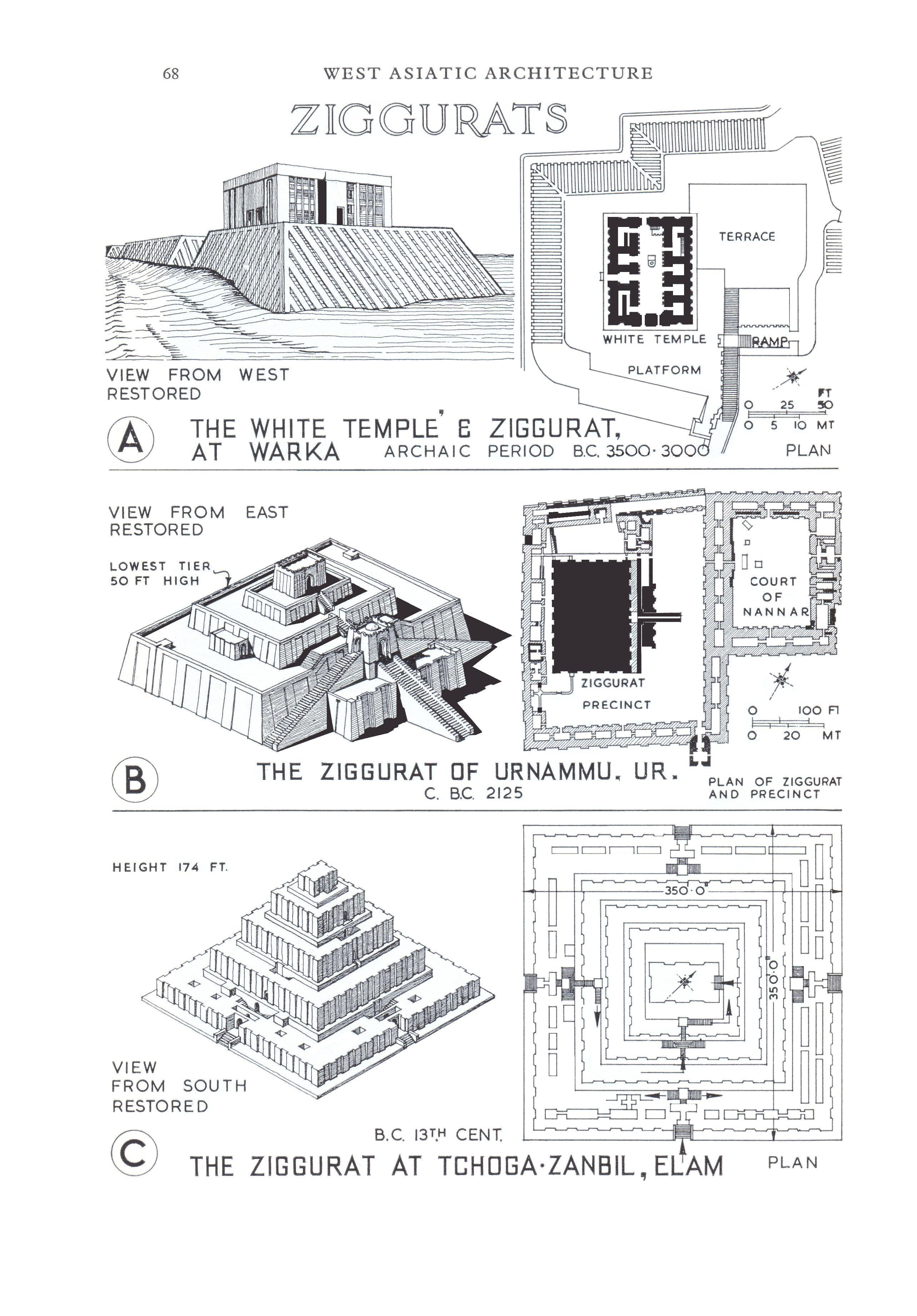
Ziggurats. 17th ed.

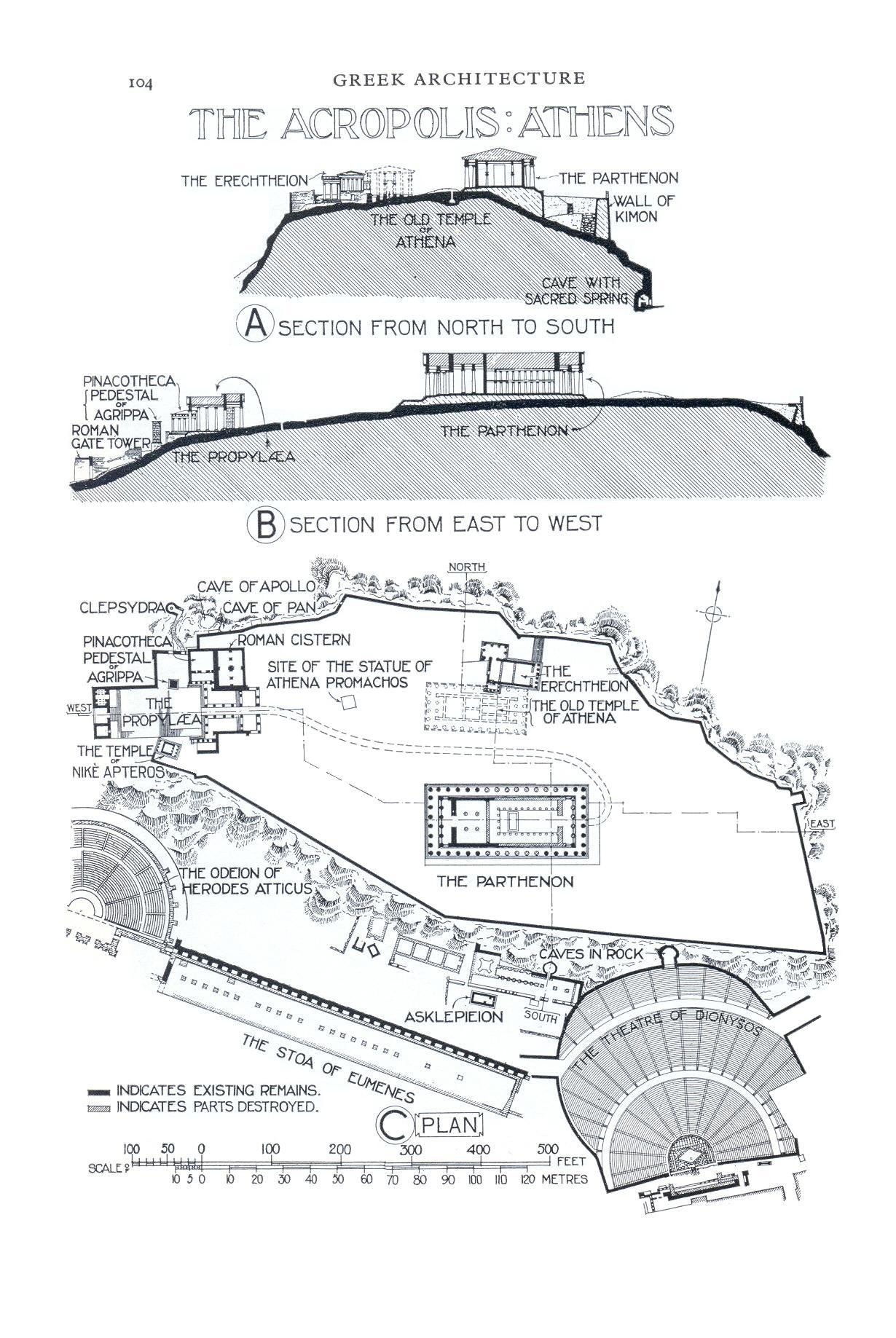
Acropolis, Athens. 17th ed.

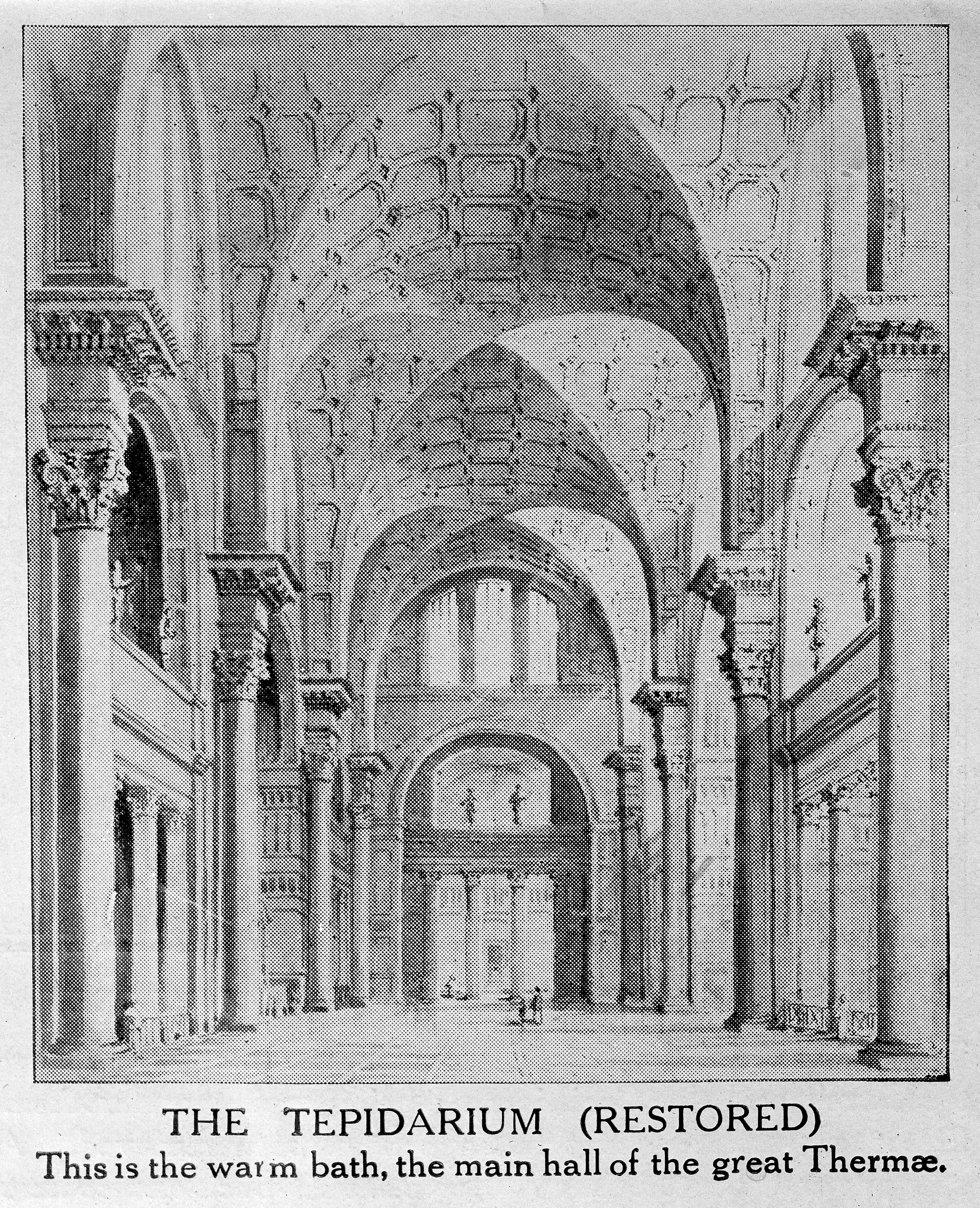
Baths of Cracalla, Rome, the Tepidarum. 7th ed.

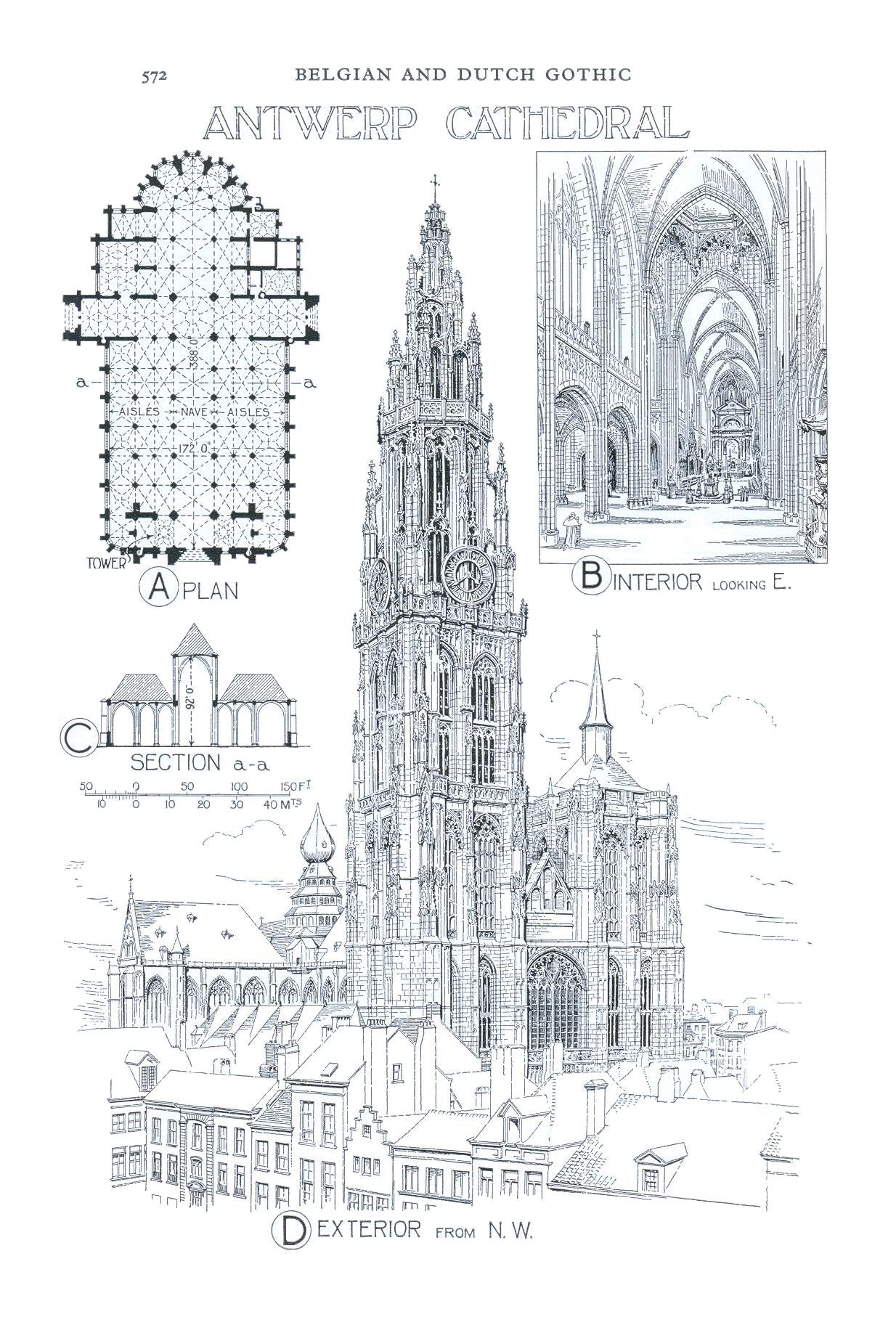
Antwerp Cathedral. 17th ed.

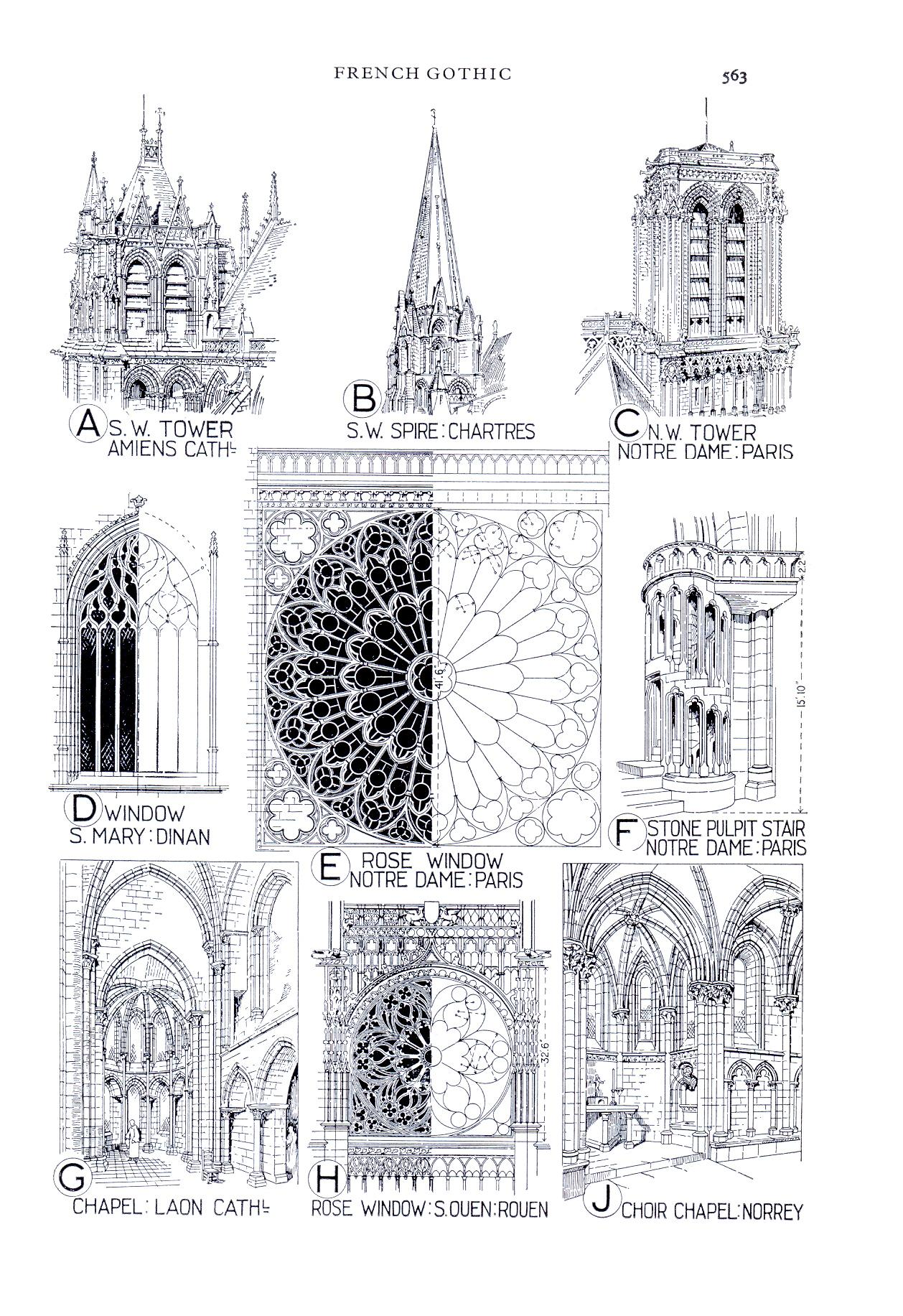
French Gothic. 17th ed.

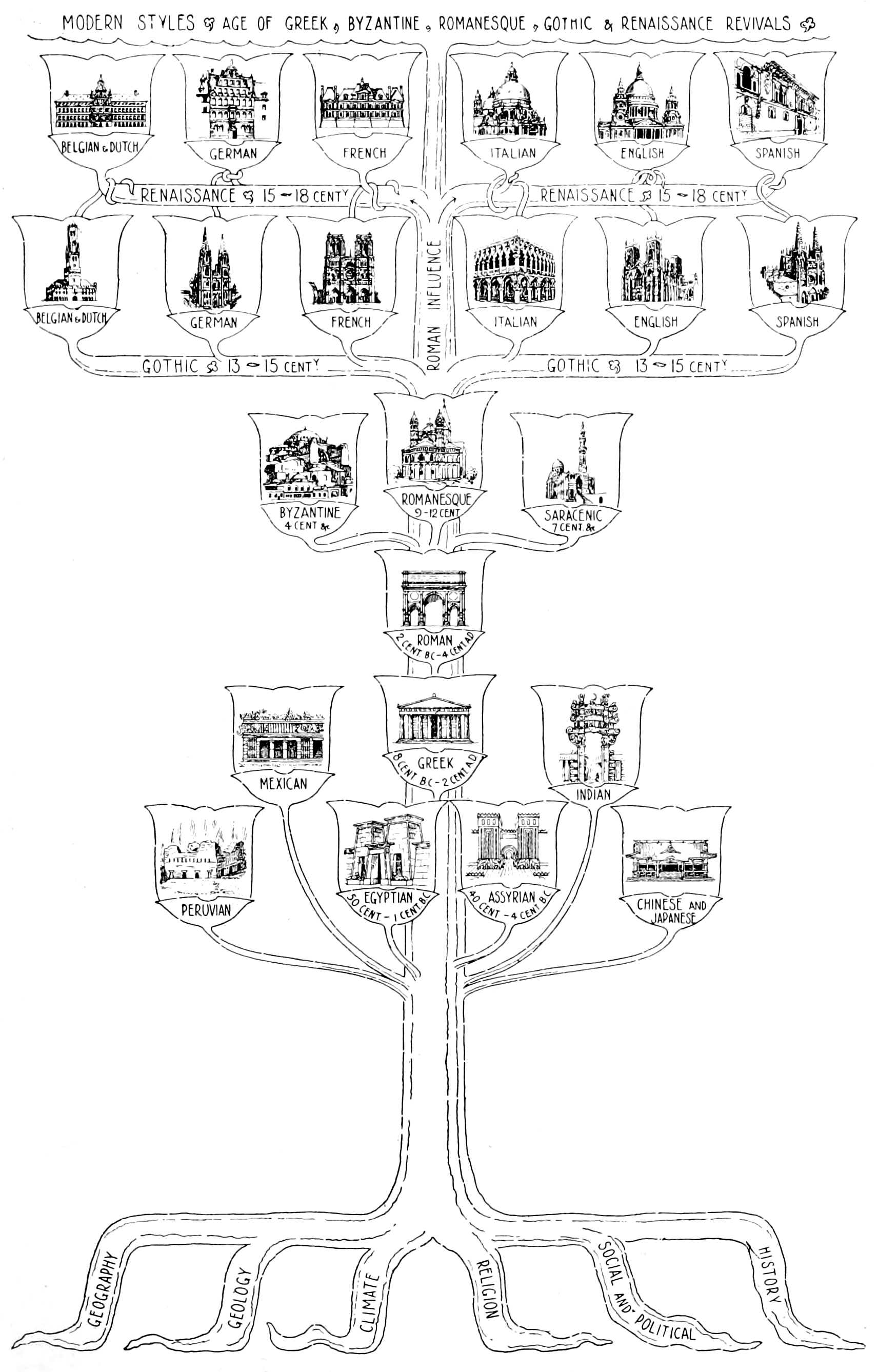
The Tree of Architecture. 7th ed.
