= Towering Ambitions: Dan Cruickshank at Ground Zero =

- Genre: Documentary film
- Written by: Dan Cruickshank
- Directed by: Sam Hobkinson
- Presented by: Dan Cruickshank
- Country of origin: United Kingdom
- Original language: English

Production
- Producers: Basil Comely; Sam Hobkinson
- Editor: Jan Cholawo
- Running time: 60 minutes

Original release
- Network: BBC Two
- Release: 7 September 2003

Towering Ambitions: Dan Cruickshank at Ground Zero is a 2003 BBC documentary film in which art historian and television presenter Dan Cruickshank tells the story of the architectural competition to rebuild Ground Zero following the 9/11 attacks, which The New Yorker architecture critic Paul Goldberger describes as "the architectural commission of a lifetime."

== Synopsis ==
The film begins with footage of the 11 September attacks followed by Dan Cruikshank's emotional July 2002 visit to the World Trade Center site and the Fresh Kills Landfill which was then being used as a sorting ground for the rubble from the site. Cruikshank attends the "Listening to the City" public forum of 20 July 2002 at which the struggle between commemoration and moving forward come to the fore and the six plans by Beyer Blinder Belle for the site are rejected.

Cruickshank returns on 11 September 2002 for the first anniversary of the attacks and to examine the results of a mock architectural competition for the site organised by New York Times architecture critic Herbert Muschamp to raise the bar of aspiration and give a jolt to the stalemate between the people and the authorities of the future of the site. The international architectural completion finally announced by the authorities is only briefly halted by a campaign to rebuild identical Twin Towers.

Cruickshank profiles four of the seven semi-finalists announced by Alexander Garvin and his team of judges in December 2002 and interviews their chief architects Richard Meier, Norman Foster, Daniel Libeskind and Rafael Viñoly of the THINK Team, the other three he deems uninspired or unworkable. Cruickshank attends a second public meeting in January 2003 where outsider Libeskind's design seems to get the most attention.

Cruickshank returns in February 2003 to follow the final frantic week in the offices of the two rival finalists as Libeskind attempts to shore up The Bathtub and the THINK Team attempts to incorporate the 9/11 Memorial Museum leading up to the head-to-head final, which Cruickshank believes was ultimately overruled by Governor George Pataki and Mayor Michael Bloomberg. The film concludes with site lease holder Larry Silverstein proposing changes to Libeskind's winning vision.

== Participants ==
- Paul Goldberger – Architecture Critic, The New Yorker
- Herbert Muschamp – Architecture Critic, New York Times
- Daniel Doctoroff – Deputy Mayor, New York City
- Alexander Garvin – Planning chief to competition judges
- Richard Meier – Competing architect
- Norman Foster – Competing architect
- Daniel Libeskind – Competing architect
- Rafael Viñoly – Competing architect
- Deborah Calandrillo
- Jane Pollicino
