= Moonbeam Magic =

1924 film

- Directed by: Felix Orman
- Written by: Felix Orman
- Produced by: Claude Friese-Greene
- Starring: Roy Travers; Mabel Poulton
- Cinematography: Claude Friese-Greene
- Production company: Spectrum Films
- Distributed by: Spectrum Films
- Release date: March 1924
- Country: United Kingdom
- Languages: Silent; English intertitles

Moonbeam Magic is a 1924 British silent fantasy film directed by Felix Orman and featuring Roy Travers and Mabel Poulton. It was made at Twickenham Studios using Prizmacolor.

== Cast ==
- Arthur Pusey
- Margot Greville
- Arthur Heslewood
- Roy Travers
- Mabel Poulton
- Kitty Foster
- Joan Carr

== See also ==
- List of early color feature films

== Bibliography ==
- Low, Rachael. History of the British Film, 1918-1929. George Allen & Unwin, 1971.
