= Britain's Best Buildings =

BBC documentary series

- Genre: Documentary
- Presented by: Dan Cruickshank
- Country of origin: United Kingdom
- Original language: English
- No. of series: 2
- No. of episodes: 9

Production
- Producers: Martin Mortimore; Naomi Austin; Tanya Batchelor
- Running time: 60 minutes

Original release
- Network: BBC Two (2002); BBC Four (2004)
- Release: 2 November 2002 – 2 June 2004

Britain's Best Buildings was a BBC documentary series in which the TV presenter and architectural historian Dan Cruickshank discussed his selection of the finest examples of British architecture. It was first broadcast on BBC Two from 2 to 23 November 2002, and returned on BBC Four from 5 May to 2 June 2004.

== Episode list ==
=== Series one ===
1. Tower Bridge 2 November 2002
2. Blenheim Palace 9 November 2002
3. Durham Cathedral 16 November 2002
4. Windsor Castle 23 November 2002

=== Series two ===
1. Harlech Castle 5 May 2004
2. Palace of Westminster 12 May 2004
3. Hardwick Hall 19 May 2004
4. The Circus, Bath 26 May 2004
5. Forth Bridge 2 June 2004

Edited editions of the Palace of Westminster edition (ranging from 5–15 minutes) are often shown on the BBC Parliament channel, when live coverage of the House of Commons, House of Lords, committees etc. ends early, before the beginning of the next programme. These edited editions are used to fill the gaps.

The UKTV channel Yesterday frequently repeats the series. However the episodes are shown in an edited 46 minute format to allow for commercials.

== Copyright violation ==
In 2004, the BBC issued an apology and made a goodwill payment to television historian Michael Morris, after it emerged that Cruickshank had repeated phrases used by Morris in a Channel 4 documentary about Harlech Castle. The BBC re-edited the programme immediately afterwards and said that a researcher, not Cruickshank, was to blame for the error.

== Companion book ==
The 2002 companion book to the series, also written by Cruickshank, covers the four buildings featured in the first series along with four additional buildings; these are Holyroodhouse, Edinburgh; Cardiff Castle; Midland Grand Hotel, St Pancras station, London; and Highpoint I, London.

=== Selected editions ===
- Cruickshank, Dan (10 October 2002). The Story of Britain's Best Buildings. BBC Books (hardcover). ISBN 978-0-563-48823-1.
- Cruickshank, Dan (10 February 2003). The Story of Britain's Best Buildings. Firefly Books (paperback). ISBN 978-1-55297-748-4.
