= Marvels of the Modern Age =

- Genre: Documentary
- Presented by: Dan Cruickshank
- Country of origin: United Kingdom
- Original language: English
- No. of seasons: 1
- No. of episodes: 4

Production
- Executive producer: Basil Comely

Original release
- Network: BBC Two
- Release: 9 May – 30 May 2006

Related
- Living with Modernism

Dan Cruickshank's Marvels of the Modern Age is a BBC documentary series in which Dan Cruickshank traces the roots of Modernism and focuses on the movement's leading lights, such as Le Corbusier and Frank Lloyd Wright, and the century's most seismic political events including the rise of Nazi Germany.

The series was first broadcast on BBC Two between 9 and 30 May 2006 to coincides with the exhibition Modernism: Designing a New World at the Victoria and Albert Museum in London.
