= Dan Cruickshank's Adventures in Architecture =

British television series

Dan Cruickshank's Adventures in Architecture is a BBC series first aired on BBC Two in April 2008 in which British architectural historian Dan Cruickshank travels around the world visiting what he considers to be the world's most unusual and interesting buildings, structures and sites. In Australia, the programme was broadcast on ABC1 from 28 May 2009.

Country	Site	Image	Country	Site	Image
Episode 1 – Beauty			Episode 2 – Death		
Greenland	Igloo		Egypt	Mortuary Temple of Hatshepsut	
China	Leshan Giant Buddha		Czech Republic	Sedlec Ossuary	
Russia	Catherine Palace		Guatemala	Yaxha	
India	Konark Sun Temple		Italy	Cimitero monumentale di Staglieno	
France	Albi Cathedral		India	Varanasi	
Episode 3 – Paradise			Episode 4 – Disaster		
Egypt	Saint Catherine's Monastery		Germany	Dresden	
China	Hanging Monastery of Heng Shan		Syria	Palmyra	
Turkey	Süleymaniye Mosque		United States	San Francisco earthquake defences	
Russia	Kizhi		Afghanistan	Minaret of Jam	
India	Sri Ranganathaswamy Temple				
Episode 5 – Connections			Episode 6 – Power		
Brazil	Brasília		Romania	Palace of the Parliament	
Syria	Damascus		Syria	Marqab Castle	
United States	Rockefeller Center		United States	Evergreen Plantation	
India	Dharavi		Turkey	Topkapı Harem	
			Kazakhstan	Astana	
Episode 7 – Dreams			Episode 8 – Pleasure		
Yemen	Shibam		India	Taj Mahal Palace	
Dominican Republic	Santo Domingo		Germany	Neuschwanstein Castle	
United States	Eastern State Penitentiary		Italy	Pompeii	
Bhutan	Thimphu		Brazil	Teatro Amazonas	
			Italy	Villa Barbaro	

== Companion book ==
- Cruickshank, Dan (3 April 2008). Adventures in Architecture. Weidenfeld & Nicolson (hardcover). ISBN 978-0-297-84444-0.
