= Yara Sharif =

- Education: Birzeit University (BArch); University of Westminster (PhD)
- Years active: 2007–present

Yara Sharif is a Palestinian architect and academic. She is a Senior Lecturer at the University of Westminster and a senior partner at NG Architects, London. Her work has earned a number of accolades, including a Holcim Foundation Award and the Aga Khan Award for Architecture..

== Early life ==
Sharif graduated with a Bachelor of Architecture (BArch) from Birzeit University. She went on to complete a Masters in Architecture, a Graduate Certificate of Education PGCert, and a PhD by Design PhD at the University of Westminster.She also obtained her RIBA PART3 qualification from the University of Westminster. Sharif's PhD thesis was commended for the RIBA President's Award for Outstanding PhD Thesis.

== Career ==
Sharif is a Senior Partner at Golzari NG Architects. She co-founded the Palestine Regeneration Team (PART). Sharif and Golzari's work on revitalising Birzeit Historic Centre, led by Riwaq Centre for Architectural Conservation, won the 2013 Aga Khan Award for Architecture. For their work on a women's Eco Kitchen in Beit Iksa, Sharif and her colleagues won the Acknowledgement Prize at the 2014 Holcim Foundation Awards for Sustainable Construction.

In 2012, Sharif joined Oxford Brookes University as a Lecturer. In 2015, she returned to the University of Westminster as a Senior Lecturer. Sharif, Golzari and Fraser received a commendation in 2016 the RIBA President's Awards for Research in the Cities and Community category.

Sharif and Golzari reunited with Riwaq Centre for Architectural Conservation to present Secrets of a Digital Garden: 50 flowers, 50 villages at the 2019 Chicago Architecture Biennial.

At the 2023 Sharjah Architecture Triennial, Sharif and Golzari displayed their mixed-media installation titled The Power of the Invisibles. The pair started the initiative Architects for Gaza (AFG). By December 2023, "hundreds" of professionals in the field had signed a statement in support of Gaza, and by the following year, the initiative had developed a "series of collaborative architectural responses". At the 2024 London Festival of Architecture, Architects for Gaza displayed a proposed Experimental Lab/Clinic to provide primary care in Gaza. Also in 2024, AFG launched the Gaza Global University offering virtual education to the displaced people of Gaza. Commissioned by the British Council, at the 2025 Venice Biennale, PART presented Objects of Repair as part of the British pavilion's Geology of Britannic Repair exhibition.

== Bibliography ==
=== Monograph ===
- Architecture of Resistance: Cultivating Moments of Possibility (2017)

=== Chapters ===
- "Surface, Air, Underground" in Reclaiming Space: The 50 Villages project in rural Palestine (2015), edited by Kaldun Bshara and Suad Amiry
- "Searching for Sub-Urban Bridges in the Village of Beit Iksa, Jerusalem" in The Social (Re)Production of Architecture: Politics, Values and Actions in Contemporary Practice (2017), with N Golzari, edited by Doina Petrescu and Kim Trogal
- "Absurd-City, Subver-City" in Open Gaza: Architectures of Hope (2020), with N Golzari, edited by Michael Sorkin and Deen Sharp
- "'A scarf, a sewage pipe and a settler: On tactics, X-ray, and the right to opacity" in The Gaze of the X-Ray: An Archive of Violence (2024), edited by Shahram Kosravi

=== Articles ===
- "Towards an Invisible Ideology: Rethinking the Spatio-political Conditions of Palestine under Israeli Domination" in Propositions: Ideology in Transparency (2009) for the Architectural Association
- "Reclaiming space and identity: heritage-led regeneration in Palestine" in The Journal of Architecture (2011), with N Golzari
- "Landscape of Time and Immobilit" in Landscape Research (2019)
- "Soft Tactics: On liberating the mental space" in Journal of Visual Culture (2021)

== Accolades ==
- 2013: RIBA President's Award for Outstanding PhD Thesis (commendation)
- 2013: Aga Khan Award for Architecture
- 2014: Holcim Foundation Awards for Sustainable Construction – Acknowledgement Prize
- 2016: RIBA President's Awards for Research – Cities and Community (commendation)
