= The Curious House Guest =

British television series

- Genre: Documentary
- Presented by: Jeremy Musson
- Country of origin: United Kingdom
- Original language: English

The Curious House Guest is a British television documentary series first broadcast on BBC Two in 2005. It is written and presented by Jeremy Musson, an architectural historian and journalist with Country Life. In each episode he visits a historic private house and combines observations on architecture with insights into the lives of the owners.

== Episode list ==
=== Series one, 2005 ===
- Chillingham Castle, Northumberland
- Chavenage House, Tetbury, Gloucester
- Burghley House, Stamford, Lincolnshire
- Castle Leslie, Monaghan
- Bellamont House, Dorset
- Bryngwyn Hall, Bwlch-y-Cibau, Llanfyllin, Powys

=== Series two, 2006 ===
- Holkham Hall, Norfolk
- Ninfa, Lazio, Italy
- Vann, Surrey (architect: W.D. Caroe)
- Hampden Great House, Jamaica
- Renishaw Hall, Derbyshire (owner: Sir Reresby Sitwell)
- Hippo Point, Kenya
- Stradey Castle, Llanelli, Carmarthenshire
- Provender House, Kent (owner: Princess Olga Andreevna Romanoff)

== See also ==
- Living with Modernism
