= RIBA President's Medals Students Award =

The RIBA President's Medals are international awards presented annually by the Royal Institute of British Architects (RIBA) to architecture students or recent graduates. Participation is by direct invitation only to over 500 schools of architecture located in 100 countries. Schools are invited to nominate up to 2 entries for the Bronze Medal, up to 2 entries for the Silver Medal, and 1 entry for the Dissertation Medal. In 2024, a record 372 entries were received from 118 schools located in 36 countries.

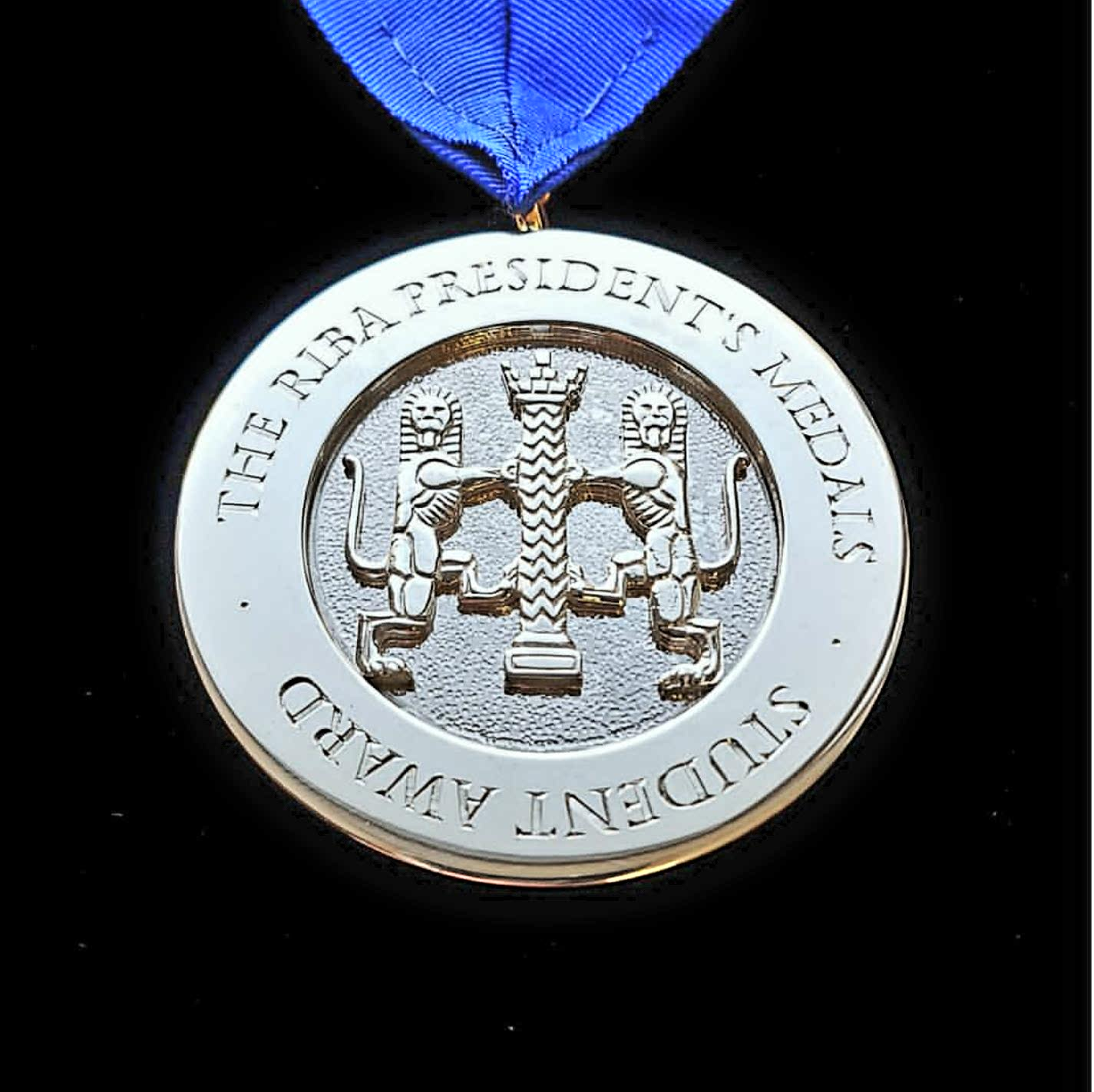
The RIBA SIlver Medal is awarded annually by the Royal Institute of British Architects to a student or recent graduate of Architecture.

== History ==
The RIBA President's Medals have been awarded annually since 1836, the year when George Godwin was awarded the Honorary Silver Medal for his essay 'Nature and Properties of Concrete, and its Application to Construction up to the Current Period'. Medals are awarded in three categories: the Bronze Medal for best design project at RIBA Part 1 or equivalent; the Silver Medal for best design project at RIBA Part 2 or equivalent; and the Dissertation Medal (written during either Part 1 or Part 2). The judges also award up to five commendations in each category, the Awards for Sustainable Design, and the Serjeant Awards for Excellence in Drawing.

As the RIBA's oldest awards (preceding the Royal Gold Medal, formally established in 1848), the RIBA President's Medals embody the RIBA's commitment to architecture and the education of individuals into understanding architecture's wider social benefits.

== Judging ==
An international jury of architects, designers and artists select the winners from entries submitted by schools of architecture worldwide. Former judges include Cedric Price, David Adjaye, David Chipperfield, Denys Lasdun, Daniel Libeskind, Ian Ritchie, Michael Hopkins, Simon Hudspith, Eva Jiricna, Will Alsop, Bob Allies, Kazuyo Sejima, Patrick Schumacher, Ken Shuttleworth, Benedetta Tagliabue, Ian Davidson, Bruce McLean, Odile Decq, Lella Vignelli, Farshid Moussavi, Nanako Umemoto, Nathalie de Vries, Eric Parry, Vicky Richardson, Ellen Van Loon, Catherine Slessor, Harriet Harriss, Hamza Shaikh, and Julia B. Bolles-Wilson.

== Ceremony ==
The winners receive their awards from the RIBA President at a ceremony held at the RIBA in early December of each year. Guest speakers have included Norman Foster, Richard Rogers, Mark Lawson, Richard MacCormac, Paul Smith, Martha Schwartz, and Alex James.

== Exhibition ==
An exhibition of winning work and selected entries is exhibited at the RIBA HQ in London for two months before touring throughout the UK and internationally. Over the last few years, and after closing in London, the President's Medals exhibition has been displayed in the UK (Belfast, Bournemouth, Canterbury, Cardiff, Edinburgh, Glasgow, Leicester, Liverpool, Newcastle, and Plymouth) and also travelled internationally to Australia, Bulgaria, Chile, China, Cyprus, Egypt, Finland, France, Hong Kong, Kuwait, India, Ireland, Lebanon, Malaysia, Oman, Romania, Saudi Arabia, Serbia, Singapore, South Africa, Sri Lanka, Turkey, and the United Arab Emirates. The touring of the exhibition is made possible by the generosity of art galleries and schools of architecture that partner with the RIBA to display the exhibition.

== Winners ==
Silver Medal:

- 2025: Glory Kamthunzi (University of the Free State, South Africa)
- 2024: Joe Franklin (Kingston University, UK)
- 2023: Ellie Harding (The London School of Architecture, UK)
- 2022: Annabelle Tan (Bartlett School of Architecture, UK)
- 2021: Tiia Partanen (University of Strathclyde, UK)
- 2020: Robert Beeny (University of Westminster, UK)
- 2019: Victoria King (University of Melbourne, Australia)
- 2018: Sonia Magdziarz (Bartlett School of Architecture, UK)
- 2017: Daniel Hall (Cooper Union, USA)
- 2016: Thomas Chee (Chinese University of Hong Kong, Hong Kong)
- 2015: Finn Wilkie (Mackintosh School of Architecture, UK)
- 2014: Nick Elias (Bartlett School of Architecture, UK)
- 2013: Ben Hayes (Bartlett School of Architecture, UK)
- 2012: SunBloc (London Metropolitan University, UK)
- 2011: Kibwe Tavares (Bartlett School of Architecture, UK)
- 2010: Jonathan Schofield (University of Westminster, UK)
- 2009: Nicholas Szczepaniak (University of Westminster, UK)
- 2008: James Tait (University of Strathclyde, UK)
- 2007: Steve Westcott (Bartlett School of Architecture, UK)
- 2006: Gillian Lambert (University of Westminster, UK)
- 2005: Yew Choong Chan (University of Westminster, UK)
- 2004: Hani Fallaha (Architectural Association, UK)
- 2003: Artur Ferreira Viveiros (London Metropolitan University, UK)
- 2002: Kristina Lundvall (London Metropolitan University, UK)
- 2001: Alexis Kyriakides (University of Westminster, UK)
- 2000: Ole Scheeren & Henrik Rothe (Architectural Association, UK) tie winner
- 2000: Takuya Onishi (Architectural Association, UK) tie winner
- 1999: Julia Von Rohr (Bartlett School of Architecture, UK)
- 1998: Matthew Springett (Bartlett School of Architecture, UK)
- 1997: The judges did not feel able to award the Silver Medal this year and awarded 2 joint runners up including Mehrnoosh Khadivi from The University of North London (UNL) now London Metropolitan University
- 1996: Stephen Wilby (University of East London, UK)
- 1995: Tim Sloan (Bartlett School of Architecture, UK)
- 1994: Abigail Ashton, Andrew Porter, and Tony Smart (Bartlett School of Architecture, UK) joint entry
- 1993: Marina Georgiou (University of North London, UK)
- 1992: Harvinder Gabhari (Royal College of Art, UK)
- 1991: Aaron Davies and Chris Thurlbourne (University of East London, UK) joint entry
- 1990: Toru Ogata (Architectural Association, UK)
- 1989: Jonathan Hale (University of Bath, UK)
- 1988: Sean Affleck (University of Sheffield, UK)
- 1987: Mouzhan Majidi & Joseph Logan & Mark Hawker (University of Strathclyde, UK)
- 1986: John Moran (University of Sheffield, UK)
- 1959: Norman Foster (University of Manchester, UK)
- 1836: George Godwin

Bronze Medal:

- 2025: William Li (Bartlett School of Architecture, UCL, UK)
- 2024: Victor Williams Salmeron (University of Kent, UK)
- 2023: Kacper Sehnke (University of Westminster, UK)
- 2022: Mary Holmes (University of Cambridge, UK)
- 2021: Ben Foulkes (Bartlett School of Architecture, UCL, UK)
- 2020: Tengku Sharil Bin Tengku Abdul Kadir (Bartlett School of Architecture, UCL, UK)
- 2019: Annabelle Tan (Bartlett School of Architecture, UCL, UK)
- 2018: Justin Bean (University of Bath, UK)
- 2017: Kangli Zheng (University of Nottingham, UK)
- 2016: Allan Chong (Newcastle University, UK)
- 2015: Boon Yik Chung (Bartlett School of Architecture, UK)
- 2014: Simon Dean (Kingston University, UK)
- 2013: Ness Lafoy (Bartlett School of Architecture, UK)
- 2012: Vidhya Pushpanathan (Architectural Association, UK)
- 2011: Basmah Kaki (Architectural Association, UK)
- 2010: Jack Hudspith (Mackintosh School of Architecture, UK)
- 2009: Wen Ying Teh (Architectural Association, UK)
- 2008: Wynne Leung & Francesco Matteo Belfiore (University of Greenwich, UK) joint entry
- 2007: Amandine Kastler (Architectural Association, UK)
- 2006: Brian Macken (Mackintosh School of Architecture, UK)
- 2005: Luke Pearson (Bartlett School of Architecture, UK)
- 2004: Ulla Tervo (London Metropolitan University, UK)
- 2003: Daniel Coll i Capdevila (Architectural Association, UK)
- 2002: Tom Holberton (Bartlett School of Architecture, UK)
- 2001: Andrew Yek (Oxford Brookes University, UK)
- 2000: Jordi Pages Ramon (Architectural Association, UK) tie winner
- 2000: Bing Huang Ler (University of Singapore) tie winner
- 1999: Sonja Stoffels (Bartlett School of Architecture, UK)
- 1998: Romed Perfler (University of North London, UK)
- 1997: Mathis Osterhage (University of North London, UK)
- 1996: Yutaka Yano (Bartlett School of Architecture, UK)
- 1995: Simon Aldridge (Bartlett School of Architecture, UK)
- 1994: Brian O'Reilly (London South Bank University, UK)
- 1993: Guy Dickinson (University of Greenwich, UK)
- 1992: Stephen Hoey (Mackintosh School of Architecture, UK)
- 1991: Chinedu Umenyilora (Architectural Association, UK)
- 1990: David Adjaye (London South Bank University, UK)
- 1989: Daniel Burr (University of Brighton, UK)
- 1988: Gavin Henderson (University of Cambridge, UK)
- 1987: Andrew Tyley (University of Bath, UK)
- 1980: Simon Hudspith (Newcastle University, UK)

Dissertation Medal:

- 2025: Finlay Aitken, (The Bartlett School of Architecture, UCL, UK)
- 2024: Bianca Zucchelli (The Bartlett School of Architecture, UCL, UK)
- 2023: Chloe Shang (Royal College of Art, UK)
- 2022: Annabelle Tan (Bartlett School of Architecture, UK)
- 2021: Richard Adetokunbo Aina (Architectural Association, UK)
- 2020: Lizzie Osborne (University of Huddersfied, UK)
- 2019: Naomi Rubbra (The Bartlett School of Architecture, UCL, UK)
- 2019: Ruth Pearn (University of Westminster, UK)
- 2018: Rosemary Milne (Edinburgh School of Architecture and Landscape Architecture, UK)
- 2017: Rhiain Bower (University of Westminster, UK)
- 2016: Roy Khatchadourian (University of Liverpool, UK)
- 2015: Marie Price (University of Westminster, UK)
- 2014: Jasper Ludewig (University of Sydney, Australia)
- 2013: Tamsin Hanke (Bartlett School of Architecture, UK)
- 2012: Mathew Leung (Bartlett School of Architecture, UK)
- 2011: Hannah Robertson (University of Melbourne, UK)
- 2010: Clare Richards (University of Westminster, UK)
- 2009: Rebecca Gregory (University of Westminster, UK)
- 2008: Dominic Severs (University of Westminster, UK)
- 2007: Joanna Rapp (University of Westminster, UK)
- 2006: Timothy O'Callaghan (University of Westminster, UK)
- 2005: Jess Hrivnak (University of Cambridge, UK)
- 2004: Olivia Gordon (Bartlett School of Architecture, UK)
- 2003: Kevin Donovan (University College Dublin, Ireland)
- 2002: Tim Fleetwood (Curtin University, Australia)
- 2001: Gwyn Lloyd Jones (Oxford Brookes University, UK)
- 1896: Banister Fletcher (University College London, UK)
- 1862: Thomas Hardy (King's College London, UK)
