= Dan Cruickshank =

British art historian and television presenter (born 1949)

Dan Cruickshank OBE
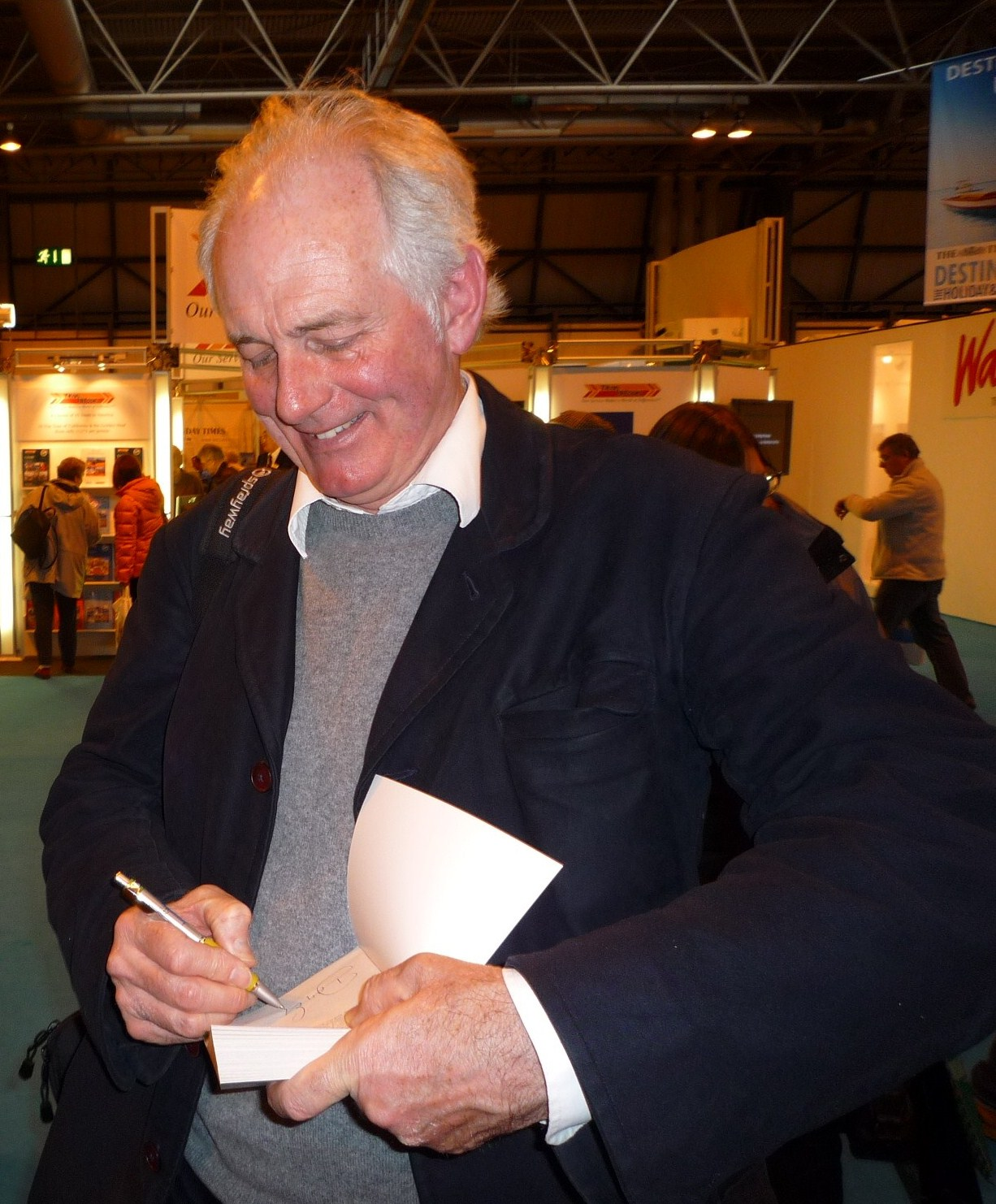
- Cruickshank in 2009
- Born: Daniel Gordon Raffan Cruickshank; 26 August 1949 (age 77)
- Occupations: Art historian; Television presenter; Author
- Children: 3

Daniel Gordon Raffan Cruickshank OBE (born 26 August 1949) is a British art historian and BBC television presenter with a special interest in the history of architecture.

== Professional career ==
Cruickshank holds a BA in Art, Design and Architecture and was formerly a visiting professor in the Department of Architecture at the University of Sheffield and a member of the London faculty of the University of Delaware. He is an honorary fellow of the Royal Institute of British Artists, a member of the executive committee of the Georgian Group and on the architectural panel of the National Trust. He is also an honorary fellow of the Royal Institute of British Architects.

He has served as Historic Buildings Consultant for ADAM Architecture since 1999 and has been involved in the repair and restoration of many historical buildings including Spencer House in St James's, Heveningham Hall, in Suffolk and numerous early 18th-century houses in Spitalfields and other parts of London.

In 2014, he was appointed President of Subterranea Britannica, a UK-based society for all those interested in man-made and man-used underground structures and space.

His professional publications include London: the Art of Georgian Building (1975), The National Trust and Irish Georgian Society Guide to the Georgian Buildings of Britain and Ireland (1985) and Life in the Georgian City (1990).

He edited the 20th edition of Sir Banister Fletcher's History of Architecture and Timeless Architecture: a study of key buildings in architectural history and is a contributing editor to Architects' Journal, The Architectural Review and Perspectives on Architecture.

== Television work ==
Cruickshank began his career with the BBC as consultant, writer and presenter on the architectural programmes One Foot in the Past and The House Detectives. He also contributed films to the Timewatch and Omnibus strands.

In 2001 he wrote and presented the series Invasion in which he examined attempts and plans to invade Britain and Ireland over the years by exploring coastal fortresses and defensive structures around the coast of the country to discover their military heritage.

Further series included Britain's Best Buildings examining architecturally – or culturally-significant buildings in Great Britain, Under Fire visiting museums and buildings in Afghanistan, Iraq and Israel to see how recent warfare has affected the country's historic artefacts, and What the Industrial Revolution Did for Us focusing on the scientific, technological and political changes of the 19th century.

In 2003, Cruickshank presented a documentary entitled Towering Ambitions: Dan Cruickshank at Ground Zero following the debate and discussion that led to the selection of Daniel Libeskind's design for the World Trade Center site in New York City; while in 2005 he presented a documentary on the Mitchell and Kenyon collection – rolls of nitrate film shot in the early 20th century, depicting everyday life in Britain, which were discovered in 1994 in Blackburn.

In 2004, Cruickshank was at the centre of a controversy when historian Marc Morris said that a documentary about Harlech Castle shown on BBC4 and billed as "written and presented by Dan Cruickshank" contained obvious borrowings from Morris's earlier Channel 4 series, Castle. The BBC subsequently stated that Cruickshank was not responsible and that it was an error by researchers.

In 2005, Cruickshank presented Around the World in 80 Treasures, charting his five-month trip around the world to visit eighty man-made artefacts or buildings that he had selected, in order to chart the history of mankind's civilisation.

In 2006, Cruickshank presented Marvels of the Modern Age, a series focusing on the development of modernism in design, from Greek and Roman architecture, to Bauhaus and the present.

Dan Cruickshank's Adventures in Architecture, a 2008 series in which he travelled around the world visiting what he considered to be the world's most unusual and interesting buildings.

In 2010, he embarked on a 3 part series on the history of the railways in Britain for National Geographic TV channel, including visits to Chester to examine the events surrounding the Dee bridge disaster of 1847, and Manchester for the Liverpool and Manchester Railway which opened in 1830. The series was entitled "Great Railway Adventures" and first appeared on UK television in the spring of 2010. In 2014, he appeared in The Life of Rock with Brian Pern as himself.

== Personal life ==
Cruickshank lives in a Georgian house in Spitalfields, London, which he shares with his partner, the painter Marenka Gabeler, their two sons, and his daughter from a previous marriage. The house was among those he featured when presenting the BBC television programme Ours to Keep – Incomers in 1985, when he discussed the role of the Spitalfields Historic Buildings Trust, a charity of which he was a co-founder in the 1970s.

Cruickshank had previously lived in a Victorian house in Bloomsbury when he was a student in the 1970s. He has also resided in Essex.

== Filmography ==
- 1985 Ours to Keep – Incomers guest presenter
- 1993 One Foot in the Past guest presenter
- 1997–2002 The House Detectives presenter
- 1997 Travels with Pevsner: Norfolk with Dan Cruickshank writer and presenter
- 2001 Timewatch writer and presenter
- 2001 Invasion writer and presenter
- 2002 Omnibus: Dan Cruickshank and the Lost Treasure of Kabul writer and presenter
- 2002 The Lost World of Tyntesfield writer and presenter
- 2002 Britain's Best Buildings writer and presenter
- 2003 Under Fire writer and presenter
- 2003 Towering Ambitions: Dan Cruickshank at Ground Zero writer and presenter
- 2003 What the Industrial Revolution Did for Us writer and presenter
- 2005 Around the World in 80 Treasures writer and presenter
- 2005 The Lost World of Mitchell & Kenyon presenter
- 2005 Egyptian Journeys with Dan Cruickshank writer and presenter
- 2006 The Lost World of Friese-Greene
- 2006 Betjeman & Me presenter
- 2006 Marvels of the Modern Age writer and presenter
- 2006 The Lost World of Tibet presenter
- 2006 Britain's Best Buildings writer and presenter
- 2008 Dan Cruickshank's Adventures in Architecture writer and presenter
- 2009 Cruickshank on Kew The Garden That Changed The World writer and presenter
- 2009 The Art of Dying writer and presenter
- 2010 Great Railway Adventures writer and presenter
- 2010 Britain's Park Story writer and presenter
- 2011 The Country House Revealed writer and presenter
- 2012 Brick by Brick: Rebuilding Our Past presenter along with Charlie Luxton
- 2012 The Bridges That Built London
- 2012 London: A Tale of Two Cities with Dan Cruickshank
- 2013 The Fairytale Castles of King Ludwig II with Dan Cruickshank writer and presenter
- 2014 The Life of Rock with Brian Pern as himself
- 2014 Majesty and Mortar: Britain's Great Palaces writer and presenter
- 2014 Dan Cruickshank and the Family That Built Gothic Britain
- 2015 Dan Cruickshank's Civilisation Under Attack
- 2015 Dan Cruickshank: Resurrecting History – Warsaw
- 2016 Dan Cruickshank: At Home with the British
- 2018 The Road To Palmyra (with Don McCullin)
- 2018 Dan Cruickshank's Monuments of Remembrance

== Bibliography ==
- Cruickshank, Dan; Wyld, Peter (1975). London: the Art of Georgian Building. The Architectural Press.
- Cruickshank, Dan; Amery, Colin (1975). The Rape of Britain. Elek (Paul) (Scientific Books). ISBN 978-0-236-31019-7.
- Cruickshank, Dan (1985). National Trust and the Irish Georgian Society Guide to Georgian Buildings of Britain and Ireland. Weidenfeld Nicolson Illustrated. ISBN 978-0-297-78610-8.
- Cruickshank, Dan; Burton, Neil (1990). Life in the Georgian City. Viking Press. ISBN 978-0-670-81266-0.
- Cruickshank, Dan; Rivers, Tony; Darley, Gillian; Pawley, Martin (1993). The Name of the Room: History of the British House and Home. BBC Books. ISBN 978-0-563-36321-7.
- Cruickshank, Dan, ed. (1996). Banister Fletcher's A History of Architecture (20th ed.). Architectural Press. ISBN 978-0-7506-2267-7.
- Cruickshank, Dan, ed. (2000). Architecture: The Critics' Choice. Aurum Press Ltd. ISBN 978-1-85410-720-6.
- Cruickshank, Dan, ed. (2001). Invasion: Defending Britain from Attack. Boxtree Ltd. ISBN 978-0-7522-2029-1.
- Cruickshank, Dan (2002). The Story of Britain's Best Buildings. BBC Books. ISBN 978-0-563-48823-1.
- Cruickshank, Dan; Vincent, David (2003). Under Fire. BBC Books. ISBN 978-0-563-48768-5.
- Cruickshank, Dan (2004). The Royal Hospital Chelsea: The Place and the People. Third Millennium. ISBN 978-1-903942-27-7.
- Cruickshank, Dan; Jackson, Nicola; Burdett, Ricky (2004). Building the BBC: A Return to Form. Wordsearch Communications. ISBN 978-1-86000-221-2.
- Cruickshank, Dan; Brindle, Steven (2005). Brunel: The Man Who Built the World. Weidenfeld & Nicolson. ISBN 978-0-297-84408-2.
- Cruickshank, Dan (2005). Around the World in Eighty Treasures. Weidenfeld & Nicolson. ISBN 978-0-297-84399-3.
- Cruickshank, Dan (2008). Adventures in Architecture. Weidenfeld & Nicolson. ISBN 978-0-297-84444-0.
- Cruickshank, Dan (2009). The Secret History of Georgian London: how the wages of sin shaped the capital. Random House. ISBN 978-1-84794-537-2. (Also released under the title London's Sinful Secret by St. Martin's Press in New York in the same year)
- Cruickshank, Dan (2011). The Country House Revealed: A Secret History of the British Ancestral Home. BBC Books. ISBN 9781849902069.
- Cruickshank, Dan (2015). A History of Architecture in 100 Buildings. William Collins. ISBN 9780007575589.
- Cruickshank, Dan (2016). Spitalfields : two thousand years of English history in one neighbourhood. Random House. ISBN 9781847947079.
- Cruickshank, Dan (2020). Soho: A Street Guide to Soho's History, Architecture and People. Weidenfeld & Nicolson. ISBN 9781780224954.
- Cruickshank, Dan (2021). Cruickshank's London: A Portrait of a City in 13 Walks. Random House. p. 560. ISBN 9781847948236.
