= The Farmer's Wife (disambiguation) =

The Farmer's Wife is a 1928 British silent film directed by Alfred Hitchcock.

The Farmer's Wife may also refer to:

- The Farmer's Wife (1941 film), a British film directed by Norman Lee
- The Farmer's Wife (1998 film), an American documentary directed by David Sutherland
- The Farmer's Wife (play), a 1916 romantic comedy by Eden Philpotts
- The Farmer's Wife (women's magazine), a S magazine published between 1905 and 1939
