= Gertrude E. Jennings =

British writer (1877–1958)

Gertrude Eleanor Jennings (1877–1958) was a British theatrical author of the early twentieth century notable for her one-act social comedies.

== Life ==
A daughter of British born Louis John Jennings, one-time editor of the New York Times (1870–1875) and subsequently MP for Stockport, and of American actress Madeleine Henriques. Her brother was book collector Richard Jennings who wrote for the Daily Mirror using the pseudonym "W.M.".

She lived most of her adult life in The Boltons, SW10, in the Borough of Kensington & Chelsea. She died aged 81 on 28 September 1958 at The Knoll House, in Fittleworth, Midhurst, Sussex.

== Career ==
Jennings began her career as an actress touring for Ben Greet’s company in South Africa and America, also working under the name of Gertrude Henriques. Her plays were published by Samuel French Ltd in London under the names of Gertrude E. Jennings, Gertrude Jennings, or G. E. Jennings.

Jennings was a prolific playwright writing 42 plays between 1910 and 1930; most of these were one-act plays. In 1914, her publisher Samuel French Ltd issued a collection of four of her early plays under the title Four One Act Plays which included "The Rest Cure," "Between the Soup and the Savoury," "The Pros and Cons," and "Acid Drops."

The quality of her one act plays of this period are very fine. In his introduction to Five Birds In a Cage (1915) in the Fourth series of One Act Plays of Today, the editor J. W. Marriott wrote:

“Miss Gertrude Jennings is a prolific writer of one act plays, and is immensely popular for a multitude of reasons. No humorist is more fully aware than she that people begin to be comic when they get into an awkward predicament, and as the situation becomes more and more hopeless the fun grows more furious. Her characters are clearly defined, and usually broadly contrasted in temperament as well as in social position. The scenes are invariably plausible incidents in present day life, and Miss Jennings intensifies effects and adds a touch of farce. Her play “Between the Soup and the Savoury” which was included in the third series of ‘’One Act Plays of Today’’, has pathos as well as laughter. “The Young Person In Pink” is the best known of her longer plays.”

Five Birds In A Cage was broadcast on the radio in the first year of the British Broadcasting Corporation on 29 November 1923, with subsequent productions on 15 April 1924 and 23 July 1926.

While Jennings primarily wrote one act plays her first full length comedy was The Young Person in Pink performed at a charity event in 1920. Other full length comedies included Love Among the Paint Pots, Money Doesn't Matter, Isabel, Edward and Anne, These Pretty Things, Family Affairs and Our Own Lives.

Jennings included issues of women's suffrage and equality in some of her plays, notably in A Woman’s Influence. The latter was performed several times in 1909 and 1910 alongside How the Vote was Won by Cicely Hamilton and Christopher St John: at a Suffrage Exhibition in Knightsbridge in May 1909; at a suffrage event in Redhill organised by the Actresses' Franchise League in November 1909 and at Maxine Elliott's Theatre in New York in 1910.

== Selected works ==
- A Woman’s Influence - a play in one act (1909). Published by Actresses' Franchise League in 1913 but performed earlier.
- Between the Soup and the Savoury - a play in one act (1910). A touching comedy about kitchen servants, first produced at the Playhouse, 1910.
- Our Nervous System - a play in one act (1911), subsequently retitled The Pros and Cons. A comedy of marriage troubles, first produced at the Playhouse, London, 1911.
- The Rest Cure - a play in one act (1914). A comedy set in a rest home in Kensington, first produced at the Vaudeville Theatre, 1914.
- Acid Drops - a play in one act (1914). A comedy set in a workhouse ward, first produced at the Royalty Theatre, 1914.
- Five Birds in a Cage - a play in one act (1915). A comedy of class relations in a broken-down lift, set in an underground railway station in London. First produced at the Haymarket Theatre, London, 1915.
- The Bathroom Door - a farce in one act (1916). A comedy set in a hotel corridor, first produced at the Victoria Palace Theatre, London, 1916.
- Poached Eggs and Pearls - a canteen comedy in two scenes (1917). A light romantic comedy set in a working men's club in the East End of London during the First World War. First produced at the Apollo Theatre, 1916.
- Allotments - a play in one act (1918)
- At the Ribbon Counter - a play in one act (1919). A comedy set in the ribbon department of a shop.
- Keeping Up Appearances (1919). First produced at the Savoy Theatre, 1915.
- No Servants - a comedy in one act (1919). A comedy about dependence on servants, first produced at the Prince's Theatre, London, 1917.
- Waiting for the 'Bus - a play in one act (1919). A comedy of social class at a bus stop, first produced at the Haymarket Theatre, 1917.
- Elegant Edward - a comedy in one act (with E Boulton) (1919)
- I'm Sorry - It's Out! - a comedy in one act (1920)
- The New Poor - a farce in one act (1920)
- In the Cellar - a farce in one act (1920)
- Bobby Settles Down - a comedy (1920)
- The Young Person in Pink - a comedy in three acts (1921). A matinee performance at the Prince of Wales Theatre in 1920 featured Leslie Howard, and John Gielgud appeared in a RADA production in 1923. Subsequently, filmed as The Girl Who Forgot in 1939.
- Me and my Diary - a comedy in one act (1921)
- Love Among the Paint Pots - a comedy in three acts (1922)
- Calais to Dover - a farce in one act (1922)
- Isabel, Edward and Anne - a comedy in three acts (1923)
- Cat's Claws - a comedy in one act (1923)
- Have You Anything to Declare? - a farce in one act (1926) - the first performance took place at the St James's Theatre, 26 March 1926, by students of the Royal Academy of Dramatic Art, directed by Kenneth Barnes and produced by Norman Page.
- Spot - a comedy for two people (1927)
- Scraps - a comedy in one act (1928)
- Helping Hands - a farce in one act (1930)
- These Pretty Things - a farcical comedy in three acts (1930). First produced at the Garrick Theatre, 1928.
- The Bride - a comedy in one act (1931)
- Pearly Gates - a comedy in one act (1932)
- Family Affairs - a comedy in 3 acts (1935). A performance at the Ambassadors Theatre in 1934 featured Margaret Lockwood.
- The Girl Who Forgot, 1940, a film directed by Adrian Brunel
- In The Black-Out - a comedy in one act (1942)
- Good Neighbours - play in one act (1942)
- Whiskers and Co. - a pantomime in three acts (1943)
- A Sleeping Beauty - pantomime in two acts (1944)
- Too Much Bluebeard - a farce in three scenes for three women (1944)
- In the Fog - a farce in one act (1947). Not one of the author's best works; a description of the earlier play In The Black-Out suggests that this is the same play given a new title.
- Bubble and Squeak - play in three acts (1947)
- The Olympian - a comedy in three acts (1955)
- Happy Memories - play in three acts (1955)
- Fireworks
- Aladdin's Cave
