= Alma Reville =

English film editor and screenwriter (1899–1982)

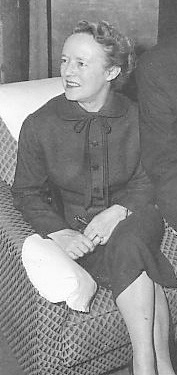
- Reville in 1955
- Born: Alma Lucy Reville; 14 August 1899; Nottingham, England
- Died: 6 July 1982 (aged 82); Los Angeles, California, U.S.
- Occupations: Editor; screenwriter
- Spouse: Alfred Hitchcock (m. 1926; died 1980)
- Children: Pat Hitchcock

Alma Lucy Reville, Lady Hitchcock (14 August 1899 – 6 July 1982) was an English screenwriter and film editor. The wife of filmmaker Alfred Hitchcock, she collaborated with her husband on films including Shadow of a Doubt, Suspicion, and The Lady Vanishes, and worked with other famous directors such as Henrik Galeen, Maurice Elvey, and Berthold Viertel.

== Early life and career ==
Reville was born on 14 August 1899 in St. Ann's Nottingham (one day after her future husband), the second daughter of Matthew Edward and Lucy (née Owen) Reville. The family moved to London when Reville was young, as her father gained a job at Twickenham Film Studios. Reville often visited her father at work and eventually obtained a job there as a tea girl. At 16, she was promoted to the position of cutter, which involved assisting directors in editing the motion pictures. Of editing, she wrote, "The art of cutting is Art indeed, with a capital A, and is of far greater importance than is generally acknowledged." She continued to work there as a scriptwriter and director's assistant. These roles enabled her to become involved in areas of film-making to which women would then rarely have access.

Twickenham Film Studio, where Reville first worked, closed in 1919, but she was given a job at Paramount's Famous Players–Lasky, a subsidiary of the American company based in Islington, where she met her future husband, Alfred Hitchcock. The same company gave him a job as a graphic designer before he became an art editor. The first film Reville worked on with Hitchcock was Woman to Woman (1923), with Reville as film editor, and Hitchcock as art director and assistant editor.

As well as editing, writing and other production roles, Reville also appeared on screen making three film appearances: a lead role in The Life Story of David Lloyd George (1918), and as an extra in Hitchcock's The Lodger: A Story of the London Fog (1927) and Sabotage (1936).

== Marriage and collaborations ==
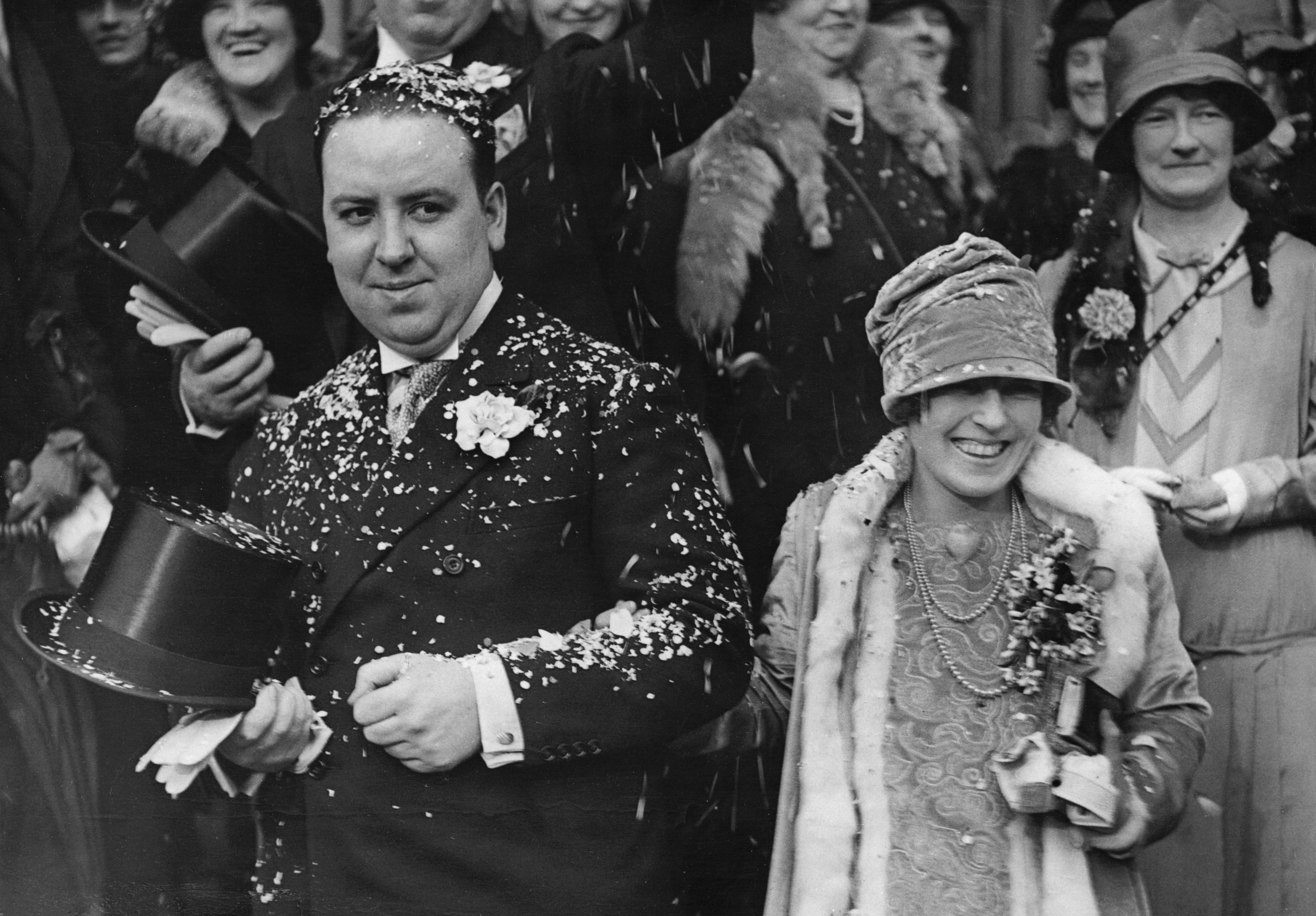
The Hitchcocks on their wedding day at Brompton Oratory in 1926

Hitchcock and Reville married on 2 December 1926 at Brompton Oratory in London after Reville converted to Roman Catholicism from Protestantism, believed to be at the behest of Hitchcock's mother. Reville was baptized on 31 May 1927 and confirmed at Westminster Cathedral by Francis Cardinal Bourne on 5 June. In 1928, when they learned that she was pregnant, the Hitchcocks purchased "Winter's Grace", a Tudor farmhouse set in 11 acres (4.45 ha) on Stroud Lane, Shamley Green, Surrey, for £2,500. Their daughter and only child, Patricia Alma Hitchcock, was born on 7 July that year.

Reville co-wrote The Ring (1927) – the first screenwriting credit she shared with Hitchcock – but worked with other directors as well. She co-wrote The Constant Nymph (1928), the first film adaptation of the best-selling novel The Constant Nymph (1924) by Margaret Kennedy, directed by Adrian Brunel. In 1929, Reville co-wrote After the Verdict, directed by Henrik Galeen and A Romance of Seville, directed by Norman Walker. In 1931 and 1932 she worked with directors such as Harry Lachman, Maurice Elvey and Basil Dean. In 1933, Hitchcock hired Joan Harrison as his assistant, and she assumed many of Reville's roles within his productions. She continued to work with some other directors, including Phil Rosen in 1934, Berthold Viertel in 1935 and Richard Wallace in 1945. Reville focused primarily on preparing and adapting her husband's scripts, including those for Rebecca, Foreign Correspondent (both 1940), Suspicion (1941) and Saboteur (1942).

Reville worked with her husband on many more scripts in Hollywood. She collaborated with Joan Harrison on the script of Suspicion, which was completed on 28 November 1940. They worked on it in the Hitchcocks' home in Bel Air, as Hitchcock preferred writing in a comfortable, intimate environment rather than an office.

Reville had a keen ear for dialogue and an editor's sharp eye for scrutinising a film's final version for continuity flaws so minor they had escaped the notice of the director or the crew. It was Reville who noticed Janet Leigh inadvertently swallowing after her character's fatal encounter in Psycho (1960), necessitating an alteration to the negative.

Reville was Hitchcock's closest collaborator and sounding board. Charles Champlin wrote in 1982: "The Hitchcock touch had four hands, and two were Alma's." When Hitchcock accepted the AFI Life Achievement Award in 1979, he said he wanted to mention "four people who have given me the most affection, appreciation and encouragement, and constant collaboration. The first of the four is a film editor, the second is a scriptwriter, the third is the mother of my daughter, Pat, and the fourth is as fine a cook as ever performed miracles in a domestic kitchen. And their names are Alma Reville".

== Death ==
Reville survived a bout of breast cancer. She died on 6 July 1982, at the age of 82, two years after her husband. She was cremated and had her ashes scattered in the Pacific Ocean, as had been done with her husband's ashes.

== In popular culture ==
Reville was portrayed by Imelda Staunton in The Girl (2012), and Helen Mirren in Hitchcock (2012). Staunton was nominated for a BAFTA and a Primetime Emmy while Mirren was nominated for BAFTA, Golden Globe and SAG awards.

== Legacy ==
In 1999, on the 100th anniversary of her birth, a plaque to Reville was unveiled in Nottingham, near the site of her birth, as part of the British Film Institute's "Centenary of Cinema" celebrations.

== Selected filmography ==
Reville wrote or co-wrote many screenplays, including:

- The Ring (1927)
- The Constant Nymph (1928)
- The First Born (1928)
- A South Sea Bubble (1928)
- After the Verdict (1929)
- A Romance of Seville (1929)
- Juno and the Paycock (1929)
- Murder! (1930)
- The Skin Game (1931)
- Mary (1931)
- The Outsider (1931)
- Sally in Our Alley (1931)
- Rich and Strange (1931)
- The Water Gipsies (1932)
- Nine Till Six (1932)
- Number Seventeen (1932)
- Waltzes from Vienna (1934)
- Forbidden Territory (1934)
- The 39 Steps (1935)
- The Passing of the Third Floor Back (1935)
- Secret Agent (1936)
- Sabotage (1936)
- Young and Innocent (1937)
- The Lady Vanishes (1938)
- Jamaica Inn (1939)
- Suspicion (1941)
- Shadow of a Doubt (1943)
- It's in the Bag (1945)
- The Paradine Case (1947)
- Stage Fright (1950)
- I Confess (1953)

== Bibliography ==
- Hitchcock O'Connell, Pat; Bouzereau, Laurent (2003). Alma Hitchcock: The Woman Behind the Man. Berkley Trade. ISBN 978-0425196199.
- Lane, Christina; Botting, Josephine (2014). ""What Did Alma Think?": Continuity, Writing, Editing and Adaptation". In Osteen, Mark (ed.). Hitchcock and Adaptation: Page and Screen. New York: Rowman & Littlefield.
- Spoto, Donald (1999) [1983]. The Dark Side of Genius: The Life of Alfred Hitchcock. New York: Da Capo Press. ISBN 978-0-306-80932-3.
