= City of Beautiful Nonsense =

City of Beautiful Nonsense can refer to:

- The City of Beautiful Nonsense (novel), a novel by E. Temple Thurston
  - The City of Beautiful Nonsense (1919 film), a 1919 film based on the novel
  - City of Beautiful Nonsense (1935 film), a 1935 film based on the novel
