= Matinee Idol (disambiguation) =

A matinée idol is a film or stage star greatly adored by their fans.

The Matinee Idol or Matinee Idol may also refer to:

- The Matinee Idol, a 1916 short film directed by Billy Quirk
- The Matinee Idol (1928 film), an American comedy-drama directed by Frank Capra
- Matinee Idol (film), a 1933 British crime film
- The Matinee Idol, a 1908 play by Anthony E. Wills
- "Matinee Idol", a track on the 1998 album Rufus Wainwright by Canadian-American singer-songwriter Rufus Wainwright
- "the Matinee Idol", nickname of Bobby Czyz (born 1962), American retired boxer
