= The Farmer's Wife (play) =

1916 romantic comedy play by Eden Phillpotts

The Farmer's Wife is a romantic comedy play by the British writer Eden Phillpotts, based on the scenario of his novel Widecombe Fair (1913). It was first staged in Birmingham in 1916. Its London premiere was at the Royal Court Theatre in 1924. By 1926 when Laurence Olivier went on tour in the lead role, the play had already been performed 1,300 times.

== Synopsis ==
After his wife dies, a farmer goes through an elaborate attempt to persuade one of his various female neighbours to marry him without realising that the ideal woman is already working as his housekeeper.

== Adaptations ==
=== Film ===
The source novel was itself made into a separate film in 1928, directed by Norman Walker. The play was twice adapted to film: the 1928 silent film The Farmer's Wife, directed by Alfred Hitchcock and starring Jameson Thomas and Lillian Hall-Davis, and the 1941 sound film The Farmer's Wife, directed by Leslie Arliss and starring Basil Sydney and Patricia Roc.

=== Television ===
Two versions of the play were made for UK television: in 1955, adapted and directed by Owen Reed, and in 1959, directed by Patrick Dromgoole as part of the Saturday Playhouse series.

=== Radio ===
In 1934, a recording for BBC Radio was adapted and produced by Cyril Wood.

=== Stage ===
The Farmer's Wife was adapted into a 1951 Broadway musical entitled Courtin' Time with a creative team including lyricist Jack Lawrence, composer Don Walker, and writer William Roos.
