= The Happy Husband =

1927 play by Harrison Owen

- Original language: English
- Written by: Harrison Owen
- Genre: Comedy

Premiere
- Date: 23 May 1927
- Place: Theatre Royal, Portsmouth

The Happy Husband is a comedy play by the British-based Australian author Harrison Owen. It premiered at the Theatre Royal, Portsmouth before transferring to the Criterion Theatre in London's West End where it ran for 109 performances between 15 June and 17 September 1927. The London cast included Madge Titheradge, Stella Arbenina, A.E. Matthews, Charles Laughton, Lawrence Grossmith, David Hawthorne, Carl Harbord in his West End debut, Marda Vanne and Ann Trevor. It was produced by Basil Dean. It was staged at the Empire Theatre on Broadway the following year, running for 72 performances.

== Adaptation ==
In 1931 it was adapted into a British film Uneasy Virtue directed by Norman Walker and featuring Fay Compton, Edmund Breon, Francis Lister and Margot Grahame.

== Bibliography ==
- Goble, Alan. The Complete Index to Literary Sources in Film. Walter de Gruyter, 1999.
- Wearing, J.P. The London Stage 1920-1929: A Calendar of Productions, Performers, and Personnel. Rowman & Littlefield, 2014.
