= Spanish Eyes =

Spanish Eyes may refer to:

- Spanish Eyes (film), a 1930 British film directed by G. B. Samuelson
- "Spanish Eyes" (1965 song), a song variation of the composition "Moon Over Naples"
- "Spanish Eyes" (Backstreet Boys song) from the album Millennium
- "Spanish Eyes" (Madonna song) from the album Like a Prayer
- "Spanish Eyes" (U2 song) from the album The Joshua Tree, appeared as the third track on the bonus audio CD
- "Spanish Eyes", a song by Bruce Springsteen on his 2010 album The Promise
- "Spanish Eyes", a song by Ricky Martin on his 1999 self-titled album
- "Spanish Eyes", a song by Tiffany on her 1987 self-titled debut album
- Spanish Eyes (pinball), a 1972 pinball game by Williams Electronics
