= Donald Calthrop =

English actor (1888–1940)

- Autographed still, 1933
- Born: Donald Esme Clayton Calthrop; 11 April 1888; Chelsea, London, England
- Died: 15 July 1940 (aged 52); Eton, Berkshire, England
- Occupation: Actor
- Years active: 1916–1940

Donald Esme Clayton Calthrop (11 April 1888 – 15 July 1940) was an English stage and film actor.

Born in London, Calthrop was educated at St Paul's School and made his first stage appearance at eighteen years of age at the Comedy Theatre, London. His first film was The Gay Lord Quex released in 1917. He starred as the title character in the successful musical The Boy in the same year. He then appeared in more than 60 films between 1916 and 1940, including five films directed by Alfred Hitchcock.

He died in Eton, Berkshire from a heart attack while he was filming Major Barbara (released in 1941). According to Ronald Neame in his autobiography, some shots in the final film had a stand-in playing Calthrop's role (from the back) and a piece of dialogue was recorded using an unnamed person who impersonated Calthrop's voice.

Calthrop is buried at St Patrick's Roman Catholic Cemetery, located in Waltham Forest, London.

He was the nephew of dramatist Dion Boucicault.

== Selected filmography ==
- Altar Chains (1916)
- Masks and Faces (1917) - Lovell
- The Gay Lord Quex (1917) - Valma
- Goodbye (1918) - Capt. Richard Adair
- Nelson (1918) - Horatio Nelson
- Shooting Stars (1928) - Andy Wilkes
- The Flying Squad (1929) - Sederman
- The Clue of the New Pin (1929) - Yeh Ling
- Blackmail (1929) - Tracy
- Atlantic (1929) - Pointer
- Spanish Eyes (1930) - Mascoso
- The Night Porter (1930) - The Porter
- Song of Soho (1930) - Nobby
- Loose Ends (1930) - Winton Penner
- Juno and the Paycock (1930) - Needle Nugent (uncredited)
- Two Worlds (1930) - Mendel (British Version)
- Murder! (1930) - Ion Stewart
- Almost a Honeymoon (1930) - Charles, the butler
- Elstree Calling (1930) - Himself / Petruchio in Taming of the Shrew
- Cape Forlorn (1931) - Parsons
- Uneasy Virtue (1931) - Burglar
- The Ghost Train (1931) - Saul Hodgkin
- Many Waters (1931) - Compton Hardcastle
- The Bells (1931) - Mathias
- Potiphar's Wife (1931) - Counsel for Defence
- Money for Nothing (1932) - Manager
- Number Seventeen (1932) - Brant - Nora's Escort
- Fires of Fate (1932) - Sir William Royden
- Rome Express (1932) - Mr. Poole
- F.P.1 (1933) - Sunshine, the Photographer
- I Was a Spy (1933) - Cnockhaert
- Early to Bed (1933) - Peschke
- Friday the Thirteenth (1933) - Hugh Nicholls
- This Acting Business (1933) - Milton Stafford
- Sorrell and Son (1933) - Dr. Richard Orange
- It's a Cop (1934) - Charles Murray
- Nine Forty-Five (1934) - Dr. Venables
- Orders Is Orders (1934) - Pavey
- Red Ensign (1934) - Macleod
- The Clairvoyant (1935) - Derelict (uncredited)
- The Divine Spark (1935) - Judge Fumaroli
- Me and Marlborough (1935) - Drunken Yokel
- The Phantom Light (1935) - David Owen
- Man of the Moment (1935) - Godfrey
- Scrooge (1935) - Bob Cratchit
- Broken Blossoms (1936) - Old Chinaman
- The Man Behind the Mask (1936) - Dr. Harold E. Walpole
- The Man Who Changed His Mind (1936) - Clayton / Lord Haslewood
- Fire Over England (1937) - Don Escobal
- Thunder in the City (1937) - Dr. Plumet
- Cafe Colette (1937) - Nick
- Love from a Stranger (1937) - Hobson
- Dreaming Lips (1937) - Philosopher
- Band Waggon (1940) - Hobday
- Let George Do It! (1940) - Frederick Strickland
- Charley's (Big-Hearted) Aunt (1940) - Guide (uncredited)
- Major Barbara (1941) - Peter Shirley
