= The Girl Who Forgot =

- Elizabeth Allan as Leonora Barradine
- Directed by: Adrian Brunel
- Written by: Gertrude Jennings (play); Louise Birt
- Produced by: Louise Birt; Daniel Birt
- Starring: Elizabeth Allan; Ralph Michael; Enid Stamp-Taylor; Basil Radford
- Cinematography: Geoffrey Faithfull
- Edited by: Charles Hasse
- Production company: Butcher's Film Service
- Distributed by: Butcher's Film Service
- Release date: 24 February 1940
- Running time: 79 minutes
- Country: United Kingdom
- Language: English
- Budget: £10,488

The Girl Who Forgot (also known as The Young Person in Pink) is a 1940 British comedy film directed by Adrian Brunel and starring Elizabeth Allan, Ralph Michael and Enid Stamp-Taylor. It was written by Louise Birt based on the 1921 play The Young Lady in Pink by Gertrude E. Jennings.

It was the final film of Brunel, who had been a leading director during the silent era.

== Plot ==
On the train back from her school to Paddington, an eighteen-year-old girl named Leonora loses her memory. This coincides with her father's decision, having just got his pilot's license, to take her mother on a flight to Baghdad. Lost in a hotel in London, she is rescued by a young man who wants to help her. However his fiancée is extremely jealous, and arranges for a poor confidence trickster to pretend to be her mother in exchange for cash.

== Cast ==
- Elizabeth Allan as Leonora Barradine
- Ralph Michael as Tony Stevenage
- Enid Stamp-Taylor as Caroline Tonbridge
- Basil Radford as Mr. Barradine
- Jeanne de Casalis as Mrs. Barradine
- Muriel Aked as Mrs. Badger
- David Keir as Drawbridge
- Rita Grant as Ada Badger
- Eileen Sharp as Sara

== Production ==
It was made at the Nettlefold Studios in Walton-on-Thames. The film's sets were designed by the art director Holmes Paul.

== Reception ==
The Monthly Film Bulletin wrote: "The story is half-real, half-fantasy and in neither case quite succeeds in being dramatic. The direction is uneven, a great deal of close-up work being used where none is necessary. But the film is excellently acted. Jeanne de Casalis and Enid Stamp-Taylor, in particular, prove in this case what a great advantage a stage training can be. Basil Radford as the father has a part well suited to his humour, and Rita Grant should be mentioned for a most sympathetic and intelligent performance as the honest daughter with the 'enterprising' mother."

Kine Weekly wrote: "The basic complications have the earmarks of stage farce and drama, but by depicting pictorially the heroine's parents' amusing flight to Baghdad the director has given the entertainment pace and scope beyond its original inheritance. Directorial resource has incidentally the co-operation of good team-work. The net result is unaffected light entertainment of comfortable appeal."
