= Wilfred Shine =

British actor (1863–1939)

Wilfred Shine (12 July 1864 – 14 March 1939 in Kingston-Upon-Thames, England) was a British actor, mainly on the stage, and a specialist in melodrama. He was the father of the actor Bill Shine.

Shine performed as Barney in John Bull's Other Island at 10 Downing Street for King George V and Queen Mary in 1911.

Upon his death in 1939, The Times described him as "entirely devoid of preciousness or histrionic mannerisms, his acting depended chiefly on the ripeness and humanity he infused into it".

== Selected filmography ==
- The Burgomaster of Stilemonde (1929)
- The Lady from the Sea (1929)
- Under the Greenwood Tree (1929)
- The Loves of Robert Burns (1930)
- The Last Hour (1930)
- Cross Roads (1930)
- Old Soldiers Never Die (1931)
- The Bells (1931)
- The Hound of the Baskervilles (1932)
- Marooned (1933)
- Out of the Past (1933)
- Over the Moon (1939)
