= Marguerite Allan =

British actress (1905–1994)

- Born: 30 August 1905; Saint Petersburg, Russia
- Died: 29 January 1994 (aged 88); Wokingham,Berkshire
- Occupation: Actress

Helen Marguerite Allan (30 August 1905 – 29 January 1994) was a Russian-born British actress, who appeared in film roles between 1928 and 1942 Allan was born in Saint Petersburg, Russia before moving to the United Kingdom, where she married Kenneth Chapman in 1948. She died in Wokingham,Berkshire on 29 January 1994. She was believed to be 88 years old.

== Selected filmography ==
- Widecombe Fair (1928)
- Under the Greenwood Tree (1929)
- The Romance of Seville (1929)
- The Plaything (1929)
- Sleeping Partners (1930)
- Stepping Stones (1931)
- Follow the Lady (1933)
- Matinee Idol (1933)
- Blossom Time (1934)
- Forbidden Territory (1934)
- Those Were the Days (1934)
- The Big Splash (1935)
- Gay Old Dog (1935)
- Prison Breaker (1936)
- Luck of the Navy (1938)
- Breach of Promise (1942)
