= Lilies of the Field (1934 film) =

- Directed by: Norman Walker
- Written by: Dion Titheradge
- Produced by: Herbert Wilcox
- Starring: Winifred Shotter; Ellis Jeffreys; Anthony Bushell; Claude Hulbert
- Cinematography: Cyril Bristow
- Music by: Philip Braham
- Production company: British and Dominions
- Distributed by: United Artists
- Release date: 1934
- Running time: 75 minutes
- Country: United Kingdom
- Language: English

Lilies of the Field (also known as Betty in Mayfair) is a 1934 British romantic comedy film directed by Norman Walker and starring Winifred Shotter, Ellis Jeffreys, Anthony Bushell and Claude Hulbert. It was made at British and Dominion Elstree Studios.

== Cast ==
- Winifred Shotter as Betty Beverley
- Ellis Jeffreys as Mrs Carmichael
- Anthony Bushell as Guy Mallory
- Claude Hulbert as Bryan Rigby
- Judy Gunn as Kitty Beverley
- Jack Raine as George Belwood
- Bobbie Comber as Withers
- Hubert Harben as Reverend John Beverley
- Maud Gill as Mrs Beverley
- Toni Edgar-Bruce as Lady Rocker
- Gladys Jennings as Monica Flane

== Bibliography ==
- Low, Rachael. Filmmaking in 1930s Britain. George Allen & Unwin, 1985.
- Wood, Linda. British Films, 1927-1939. British Film Institute, 1986.
