= Fires of Fate (1932 film) =

1932 film

- Feature on the film in Picture Show (14 January 1933)
- Directed by: Norman Walker
- Written by: Arthur Conan Doyle (novel); Dion Titheradge
- Produced by: Norman Walker
- Starring: Lester Matthews; Kathleen O'Regan; Dorothy Bartlam; Jean Cadell
- Cinematography: Claude Friese-Greene
- Edited by: Bert Bates
- Music by: Idris Lewis
- Production company: British International Pictures
- Distributed by: Wardour Films
- Release date: September 1932
- Running time: 74 minutes
- Country: United Kingdom
- Language: English

Fires of Fate (also known as The Tragedy of the Korosko) is a 1932 British adventure film directed by Norman Walker and starring Lester Matthews, Kathleen O'Regan and Dorothy Bartlam. It was adapted by Dion Titheradge from the 1909 play Fires of Fate by Arthur Conan Doyle which was in turn based on his 1898 novel The Tragedy of the Korosko. It was largely filmed in Egypt.

== Preservation status ==
The British Film Institute National Archive holds a collection of scripts and stills but no film or video materials.

== Plot ==
Having been told he is suffering from a spinal condition that will cause his premature death, Lieutenant Colonel Egerton decides to journey up the Nile and escape his troubles. He joins a group of travellers and falls in love with Kay Byrne, but realises marriage is impossible. When the group is captured by bandits, Egerton is severely beaten and left for dead. He recovers, getting a message to the Camel Corps, who come to the group's rescue. In a twist of fate, Egerton's injuries at the hands of the bandits have in fact cured him, and he is able to marry Kay.

== Cast ==
- Lester Matthews as Lieutenant Colonel Egerton
- Kathleen O'Regan as Nora Belmont
- Dorothy Bartlam as Kay Byrne
- Jean Cadell as Miss Byrne
- Donald Calthrop as Sir William Royden
- Hubert Harben as Rev. Mark Royden
- Clifford Heatherley as Abdullah
- Arthur Chesney as Mr. Braddell
- Jack Raine as Filbert Frayne
- Garry Marsh as Captain Archer

== Reception ==
Film Weekly wrote: "Though a little jerky in development, the plot is firmly handled, and the essentially English characters are well realised. Out-of-the-ordinary entertainment."

Kine Weekly wrote: "The absence of subtlety causes the interest to flag, but the picturesque locations, desert skirmishes, and restrained love interest go some way towards establishing popular appeal. ... Lester Matthews is good as the strong, silent, long-suffering Egerton, and succeeds in bringing conviction to the role. Dorothy Bartlam makes an intelligent and appealing Kay. ... Norman Walker has not brought a great deal of imagination into play in his handling of the story, and his straightforward treatment results in the secrets being revealed far too early for the drama to be maintained at concert pitch."

Variety wrote: "Done from a Conan Doyle story without the Conan Doyle touch, Fires of Fate is a rather elemental melodrama with chief reliance placed on authentic desert locales in the Egyptian Sudan and a generous overuse of the Egyptian Camel Corps. ... Players lack distinction, though! all work earnestly."
