= The Party's Over (1965 film) =

1963 British film by Guy Hamilton

- Theatrical release poster
- Directed by: Guy Hamilton
- Written by: Marc Behm
- Produced by: Anthony Perry
- Starring: Oliver Reed; Clifford David; Ann Lynn; Katherine Woodville
- Cinematography: Larry Pizer
- Edited by: John Bloom
- Music by: John Barry
- Distributed by: Monarch Film Corporation (UK); Allied Artists Pictures (US)
- Release date: 22 April 1965
- Running time: 94 minutes
- Country: United Kingdom
- Language: English
- Budget: £100,000

The Party's Over is a 1965 British drama film directed by Guy Hamilton and starring Oliver Reed, Clifford David, Ann Lynn and Katherine Woodville. It was written by Marc Behm, produced by Anthony Perry, with music by John Barry.

Filmed in 1963, it was censored in the UK over scenes of implied necrophilia, which delayed its release until 1965. Guy Hamilton asked for his name to be removed from the credits in protest at the censorship of the film.

== Plot ==
A troubled young American woman, Melina, visits London and encounters a group of beatniks in Chelsea who live lives very different from her own. One of the beatnik group, the devil-may-care Moise (pronounced like Louise), is determined to seduce her, but she resists. The group believe in free love and spend their time smoking and listening to jazz in windowless rooms. Uncertain what she wants in life, she has been avoiding transatlantic phone calls from her fiancé, Carson, who is eventually sent to London by her wealthy father to bring her back for her wedding.

The beatniks use diversionary tactics to misdirect Carson, and Melina continues to evade him, although he comes close to finding her several times. The beatniks hang around in an old theatre. One (Phil) gets depressed and goes to the rooftop. The group variously taunt him or shout at him from the ground and he falls forward to his death. His suicide is blamed on failing his university exams but the group know differently. The suicide is then explained: Melina has passed out at a party and the crowd decide to bury her as a joke. They dig a grave on a building site, but when they go back for "the body" Melina has disappeared (but Phil is still there).

Meanwhile one of the female beatniks (Nina) is spending a lot of time with Carson and he falls in love with her. Melina's father arrives to help Carson search, but it appears that Melina really is dead at the point where they sign for "the clothes of the deceased" at a morgue. Nina admits she has known this all along. When Carson finally confronts Moise it is revealed that Melina truly was dead, having fallen off a balcony and broken her neck, but the party-goers simply presume she has passed out. Only Phil (who kisses her on the ground) realises she is dead. The mock funeral is therefore accidentally real.

It eventually appears that Moise loved Melina, and Carson loves Nina more than Melina.

At the end, Melina's coffin is placed on a train to Southampton by Carson and her father. Moise appears and threatens Carson that he will tell her father the truth. Ultimately all he says is "I'm sorry". There is no explanation as to why the cause of death was not established at the morgue. Carson leaves arm in arm with Nina, and Moise and Libby leave the rest of their beatnik crowd behind.

== Cast ==
- Oliver Reed as Moise
- Clifford David as Carson
- Ann Lynn as Libby
- Katherine Woodville as Nina
- Louise Sorel as Melina
- Mike Pratt as Geronimo the drummer
- Maurice Browning as Tutzi
- Jonathan Burn as Phillip
- Roddy Maude-Roxby as Hector
- Annette Robertson as Fran
- Alison Seebohm as Ada
- Barbara Lott as Almoner
- Eddie Albert as Milena's father, Ben

== Release ==
=== Censorship ===
The film was submitted to the British Board of Film Classification (BBFC) in March 1963. John Trevelyan, the Secretary of the Board of the BBFC, called the film "unpleasant, tasteless and rather offensive". The BBFC requested three rounds of cuts, before granting an X certificate and allowing the film to finally reach cinemas in the UK in 1965. Two big changes were incorporated: a voice-over by Oliver Reed and a happier ending focusing on Nina and Carson.

Director Guy Hamilton, the producer, and the executive producer all had their names removed from the credits in protest.

=== Critical reception ===
The Monthly Film Bulletin wrote: "Although one commiserates with the film's producer and director, who felt it necessary to remove their names from the credits following censor cuts, the so-called mangled version is so unrewarding that the whole business seems pointless. Once again we are in the beatnik world (which means a lot of hectic if joyless dancing, vaguely rebellious behaviour, and casual sleeping around), presented even less convincingly than usual, and aggravated by some appalling acting from most of the cast and direction which ensures that each scene is shot in as boring a manner as possible. The moral of the tale, emphasising how futile and empty this kind of life can be, might have held some force if the people had been at all interesting; in the event, Eddie Albert's lament over his dead daughter provides the only moment of real human contact and the one solidly professional performance."

In a positive retrospective review for The Guardian, Philip French found the film of "considerable historic interest."

Leslie Halliwell wrote in Halliwell's Film Guide: "Tasteless and boring swinging London trash which became notorious when its producers (Rank) disowned it because it features a party at which a man makes love to a dead girl. An unattractive display of moral squalor."

The Radio Times Guide to Films gave the film 1/5 stars, writing: "This bizarre study in necrophilia was shot in 1963 and banned outright by the British film censor. When it was re-edited and then released in 1965, producer Anthony Perry and director Guy Hamilton took their names off the credits. While one admires their integrity, the movie is a real stinker. Set in Chelsea in the Swinging Sixties, it's about the daughter of an American industrialist who falls in with a crowd of beatniks, led by a menacing Oliver Reed. The poor girl goes to the party, ends up dead and is then ravished."

=== Home media ===
The Party's Over was released on Dual Format Edition in the UK as part of the BFI's Flipside series.
