= Vincent Holman =

British actor (1886–1962)

- 1939 Spotlight photo
- Born: 22 September 1886; Wandsworth, London, England, UK
- Died: 7 April 1962 (aged 75); London, England, UK
- Occupation: Actor

Vincent Holman (22 September 1886 – 7 April 1962) was a British stage, film and television actor. On stage, he was in the original cast of Arnold Ridley's The Ghost Train at Brighton's Theatre Royal and London's St. Martin's Theatre in 1925-1926.

== Selected filmography ==
- These Charming People (1931) - Andrews (uncredited)
- Stamboul (1931) - Minor Role (uncredited)
- Holiday Lovers (1932) - Salesman (uncredited)
- Follow the Lady (1933) - Parsons
- A Taxi to Paradise (1933) - Dunning
- The Shadow (1933) - Wallis
- Death at Broadcasting House (1934) - Detective (uncredited)
- The Feathered Serpent (1934) - Inspector Clarke
- The Right Age to Marry (1935) - (uncredited)
- The Silent Passenger (1935) - Works Manager
- Sexton Blake and the Mademoiselle (1935) - Carruthers
- A Fire Has Been Arranged (1935) - Ex-Detective (uncredited)
- Prison Breaker (1936) - Jackman
- A Touch of the Moon (1936) - (uncredited)
- Gaol Break (1936)
- The Shadow of Mike Emerald (1936) - John Ellman
- To Catch a Thief (1936) - Galloway
- Three Maxims (1936) - Cafe Proprietor
- Special Edition (1938) - Inspector Bourne
- Kate Plus Ten (1938) - Detective
- The Arsenal Stadium Mystery (1939) - Coroner (uncredited)
- Traitor Spy (1939) - Hawker
- The Stars Look Down (1940) - 1st Arresting Policeman (uncredited)
- Crimes at the Dark House (1940) - Asylum Doctor (uncredited)
- The Briggs Family (1940) - Inspector
- 'Pimpernel' Smith (1941) - Doctor at Diggings (uncredited)
- Penn of Pennsylvania (1942) - (uncredited)
- The Day Will Dawn (1942) - Sergeant-Major at Evacuation (uncredited)
- Front Line Kids (1942) - (uncredited)
- The Goose Steps Out (1942) - Member of the General Staff (uncredited)
- King Arthur Was a Gentleman (1942) - (uncredited)
- Somewhere on Leave (1943) - Butler
- We Dive at Dawn (1943) - Danish Captain (uncredited)
- The Life and Death of Colonel Blimp (1943) - Club Porter (1942)
- Tawny Pipit (1944) - Ministry Doorman (uncredited)
- Time Flies (1944) - Burleigh (uncredited)
- Love Story (1944) - Prospero
- Medal for the General (1944) - Briggs (uncredited)
- He Snoops to Conquer (1945) - Butler
- Waterloo Road (1945) - Police Inspector at Dance Hall (uncredited)
- I Didn't Do It (1945) - Erasmus Montague
- Perfect Strangers (1945) - ARP Warden
- Johnny Frenchman (1945) - Truscott
- Home Sweet Home (1945) - The Parson
- Pink String and Sealing Wax (1945) - Greengrocer (uncredited)
- The Echo Murders (1945) - Col. Wills
- The Trojan Brothers (1946) - P.C. Graves
- So Evil My Love (1948) - Rogers
- The Story of Shirley Yorke (1948) - Bates
- Brass Monkey (1948) - Chief Customs Inspector
- Cardboard Cavalier (1949) - Lord Doverhouse
- The Bad Lord Byron (1949) - Bailiff
- The Sound Barrier (1952) - Factor (uncredited)
- My Death Is a Mockery (1952) - Prison Governor
- John Wesley (1954) - Beaumont, a Quaker
- Three's Company (1954) - Mr. Smythe (segment "Take a Number' story)
- The Ladykillers (1955) - Station Master (uncredited)
- Storm Over the Nile (1955) - Burroughs' Butler
- You Pay Your Money (1957) - Briggs
