= The Life Story of David Lloyd George =

- Directed by: Maurice Elvey
- Written by: Sidney Low
- Starring: Norman Page; Alma Reville; Ernest Thesiger; Douglas Munro
- Production company: Ideal Film Company
- Distributed by: Ideal Film Company
- Release date: 1996
- Country: United Kingdom
- Language: English

The Life Story of David Lloyd George (originally titled The Man Who Saved The Empire) is a 1918 British silent biopic film directed by Maurice Elvey and starring Norman Page, Alma Reville and Ernest Thesiger. The film "is thought to be the first feature length biopic of a contemporary living politician". Finished in 1918, it was not shown publicly until 1996.

== Production background ==
The Life Story of David Lloyd George is about David Lloyd George, British Prime Minister from 1916 to 1922. It was written by Sidney Low, directed by Maurice Elvey, and stars Norman Page as Lloyd George. Other actors who appear are Ernest Thesiger, Alma Reville, and Douglas Munro. The film was produced by the Ideal Film Company, which had been started around 1910 by two Jewish Manchester-born brothers, Harry Moses and Simon Rowson (born Rosenbaum).

The film's release was much anticipated, and the film press carried impressive advertisements for it in late 1918. However, in December 1918, all the advertisement stopped, following an attack in the influential paper John Bull by its owner, the MP Horatio Bottomley, who claimed that the Rowsons, because they had changed their last name and had employed some foreign-born extras to play soldiers in the film's war scenes, had less than patriotic motives for making the film. The Rowsons started the process of suing him for libel, but were shortly afterwards informed that Lloyd George, who initially had supported the production of the film, no longer wanted it shown. Solicitors, presumably acting for the government or for Lloyd George's Liberal Party, visited the film company, paid £20,000 in cash (a very high figure at the time), and walked away with the negative and the only print. The reason why Lloyd George took this action is still unknown, but is the subject of much speculation.

Dr Seth Thévoz on The Life Story of David Lloyd George.

== Preservation status ==
Long believed destroyed, the film was rediscovered in the Lloyd George family archives in 1994 by the Wales Film and Television Archive (later the National Library of Wales' National Screen and Sound Archive of Wales). When fully restored, the film had its world premiere in Cardiff in 1996.

In 2009, the film was released on DVD and in 2010 was inscribed in UNESCO's UK Memory of the World Register.
