= The Man at the Gate =

- U.S. poster
- Directed by: Norman Walker
- Written by: Minnie Louise Haskins (poem); H. Manning Haynes; Lydia Hayward; Harold Simpson
- Produced by: James B. Sloan
- Starring: Wilfrid Lawson
- Cinematography: Eric Cross
- Edited by: Sam Simmonds
- Music by: Albert Cazabon
- Production company: G.H.W. Productions
- Distributed by: General Film Distributors
- Release date: 12 July 1941
- Running time: 48 minutes
- Country: United Kingdom
- Language: English

The Man at the Gate (Also known as Better than Light ; U.S. title: Men of the Sea) is a 1941 British second feature ('B') drama film directed by Norman Walker and starring Wilfrid Lawson. It was written by Lydia Hayward and Harold Simpson from a story by H. Manning Haynes and the 1908 poem The Gate of the Year by Minnie Louise Haskins.

== Plot ==
Cornish fisherman's wife Mrs. Foley has lost two sons at sea, and is anxious that George, her last surviving son, should not suffer the same fate. After marrying a local girl and settiling down to a quiet and safe life, when the war breaks out George joins the Navy. Fearing he has been lost at sea, Mrs Foley suffers a crisis of faith, but finds solace in the poem by Minnie Louise Haskins. Later, she receives the news that George is safe.

== Cast ==
- William Freshman as George Foley
- Hubert Harben as Rev. Trant
- Mary Jerrold as Mrs. Foley
- Trefor Jones as Mr. Moneypenny
- Wilfrid Lawson as Henry Foley
- Kathleen O'Regan as Ruth
- Charles Rolfe as Mr. Portibel
- Leonard Sharp as man who brings message to church
- Harry Terry as fisherman

== Reception ==
The Monthly Film Bulletin wrote: "The focal point of this film, of course, is the quotation from Miss Haskin's [sic] poem, around which the story has been somewhat loosely constructed. The construction, indeed, is so loose that there is a marked weakness both in motivation and suspense. The one thing which saves the film from mediocrity are the shots of Cornish natural backgrounds, and these are so well photographed that they will delight those who like watching pleasant pictures as much as they may alienate those who resent such a substitute for excellence in film-making. The cast acts competently, but the only one more than merely competent is Wilfrid Lawson. Even so it is doubtful whether he can adequately sustain such a major role as this without a more flexible technique. The ordinary English life and settings will probably make this film popular, but those who remember the same director's Turn of the Tide will regret that he should have ignored the work done in the documentary field in the six intervening years and be content with trying to repeat his former success."

Kine Weekly wrote: "Drama of seafaring life, telling of a wife and mother who loses faith when the sea takes heavy toll on her family, but regains it while listening to a quotation from Miss Haskins' poem The Man at the Gate during the King's Christmas broadcast of 1939. Tradition as well as religion is a powerful plank in the story structure, and the two reinforced by sincere acting and direction and authentic atmosphere, support an unusual, if occasionally gloomy screen play. Out of the rut sppport, particularly for family halls."

Picturegoer wrote: "It is all very sentimental and rather theatrical but the acting helps to counterbalance these defects. Wilfrid Lawson is good as the husband and William Freshman sound as the son, Kathleen O'Regan does well as the boy's wife."

Leslie Halliwell wrote "Modest family drama which strives to be inspirational."

In British Sound Films: The Studio Years 1928–1959 David Quinlan rated the film as "mediocre", writing: "Rather theatrical sentiment."
