= Follow the Lady (film) =

1933 film directed by Adrian Brunel

- Directed by: Adrian Brunel
- Written by: Adrian Brunel
- Produced by: George Smith
- Starring: Marguerite Allan; William Hartnell; D. A. Clarke-Smith
- Production company: George Smith Productions
- Distributed by: Fox Film Corporation
- Release date: September 1933
- Running time: 49 minutes
- Country: United Kingdom
- Language: English

Follow the Lady is a 1933 British comedy film directed and written by Adrian Brunel and starring Marguerite Allan, William Hartnell and D. A. Clarke-Smith. The film was a quota quickie, produced for the Fox Film Corporation.

== Preservation status ==
The British Film Institute National Archive holds a collection of stills but no film or video materials.

== Plot ==
Mike Martindale and Paul Barlow, two young bachelors sharing a flat, spend a riotous evening out and get hopelessly drunk. Paul returns home with a French girl named Suzette, unaware that she is actually in league with a blackmailer, while Mike takes in a baby he finds abandoned on their doorstep. The next morning leaves both men steeped in embarrassment, and the entertainment lies in the chaotic way they manage to save face.

== Cast ==
- Marguerite Allan as Suzette
- D. A. Clarke-Smith as Flash Bob
- William Hartnell as Mike Martindale
- Marie Hemingway as Lady Saffron
- Vincent Holman as Parsons
- Basil Moss as Paul Barlow

== Reception ==
Kine Weekly wrote: "Comedy, an unpretentious essay in the piquant and daring, which does not quite succeed in scoring full marks, but nevertheless provides lively supporting entertainment. Billy Hartnell is resourcetul as Mike, Marguerite Allan makes a saucy Suzette, and all the rest are good."

The Daily Film Renter wrote: "Handled with ingenuity, even ths familiar plot might have yielded a few entertainment dividends, but here it is presented slowly. A 'drunk' interlude is fairly amusing, but the 'complications' become boring. None of the cast appears to work up much enthusiasm for their roles, but a word of praise should go to Billy Hartnell as Mike, who does his best to convince."
