= Song of Soho =

1930 film

- Directed by: Harry Lachman
- Written by: Randall Faye; Harry Lachman; Frank Launder; Val Valentine; Arthur Wimperis
- Produced by: John Maxwell
- Starring: Carl Brisson; Edna Davies; Donald Calthrop
- Cinematography: Claude Friese-Greene
- Production company: British International Pictures
- Distributed by: First National-Pathé Pictures
- Release date: 14 March 1930
- Running time: 96 minutes
- Country: United Kingdom
- Language: English

Song of Soho is a 1930 British musical film directed by Harry Lachman and starring Carl Brisson, Edna Davies and Donald Calthrop. It was produced by British International Pictures at the company's Elstree Studios outside London.

== Plot ==
An ex-French Foreign Legion soldier comes to Soho and ends up as a singer in a cafe.

== Cast ==
- Carl Brisson as Carl
- Edna Davies as Camille
- Donald Calthrop as Nobby
- Henry Victor as Henry
- Lucienne Herval as Lucienne
- Antonia Brough as Antonia
- Charles Farrell as Legionnaire
- Andrea Nijinsky as Dancer
