= The Shadow Between (1931 film) =

1931 film

- Directed by: Norman Walker
- Written by: Dion Titheradge; Norman Walker
- Produced by: John Maxwell
- Starring: Godfrey Tearle; Kathleen O'Regan; Olga Lindo; Ann Casson
- Cinematography: Claude Friese-Greene
- Production company: British International Pictures
- Distributed by: Wardour Films
- Release date: 8 September 1931
- Running time: 87 minutes
- Country: United Kingdom
- Language: English

The Shadow Between is a 1931 British romantic drama film directed by Norman Walker and starring Godfrey Tearle, Kathleen O'Regan, Olga Lindo and Ann Casson. It was produced by British International Pictures and shot at the company's Elstree Studios outside London.

== Cast ==
- Godfrey Tearle as Paul Haddon
- Kathleen O'Regan as Margaret Haddon
- Olga Lindo as Nell Baker
- Ann Casson as Betty Fielder
- Haddon Mason as Philip
- Mary Jerrold as Mrs. Maddox
- Hubert Harben as Reverend Simon Maddox
- Henry Wenman as Sergeant Blake
- Henry Caine as Wincher
- Morton Selten as Sir George Fielder
- Arthur Chesney as Pug Wilson
- Jerrold Robertshaw as Mr. Haddon

== Bibliography ==
- Low, Rachael. Filmmaking in 1930s Britain. George Allen & Unwin, 1985.
- Wood, Linda. British Films, 1927–1939. British Film Institute, 1986.
