= Uneasy Virtue =

1931 film

- Directed by: Norman Walker
- Written by: Norman Walker
- Based on: The Happy Husband by Harrison Owen
- Starring: Fay Compton; Edmund Breon; Francis Lister; Margot Grahame
- Cinematography: Claude Friese-Greene
- Production company: British International Pictures
- Distributed by: Wardour Films
- Release date: 5 February 1931
- Running time: 83 minutes
- Country: United Kingdom
- Language: English

Uneasy Virtue is a 1931 British comedy film directed by Norman Walker and starring Fay Compton, Edmund Breon, Francis Lister, Donald Calthrop, and Garry Marsh. It was written by Walker based on the 1927 West End play The Happy Husband by Harrison Owen, and was produced by British International Pictures at the company's Elstree Studios.

== Preservation status ==
The British Film Institute National Archive holds a collection of ephemera and stills but no film or video materials.

== Synopsis ==
A loyal wife cultivates the impression that she has affairs with a variety of other men.

== Cast ==
- Fay Compton as Dorothy Rendell
- Edmund Breon as Harvey Townsend
- Francis Lister as Bill Rendell
- Margot Grahame as Stella Tolhurst
- Donald Calthrop as burglar
- Garry Marsh as Arthur Tolhurst
- Dodo Watts as Sylvia Fullerton
- Adele Dixon as Consuelo Pratt
- Hubert Harben as Frank K. Pratt
- Gerard Lyley as Sosso Stephens
- Margaret Yarde as Mrs Robinson
- Molly Lamont as Ada

== Reception ==
Film Weekly wrote: "Fay Compton gives a polished performance ... which is matched by that of Edmund Breon as the husband. They give life to a film which too greatly resembles the stage play from which it is adapted."

Kine Weekly wrote: "A bright, polished, society comedy, which has a story with some point, and tempers its humour with touches of sophisticated cynicism. The acting of the leading players is effective, and the production qualities are satisfactory. Altogether a diverting light offering, which can be confidently recommended for general exhibition."
