= E. Temple Thurston =

British poet, playwright and author (1879–1933)

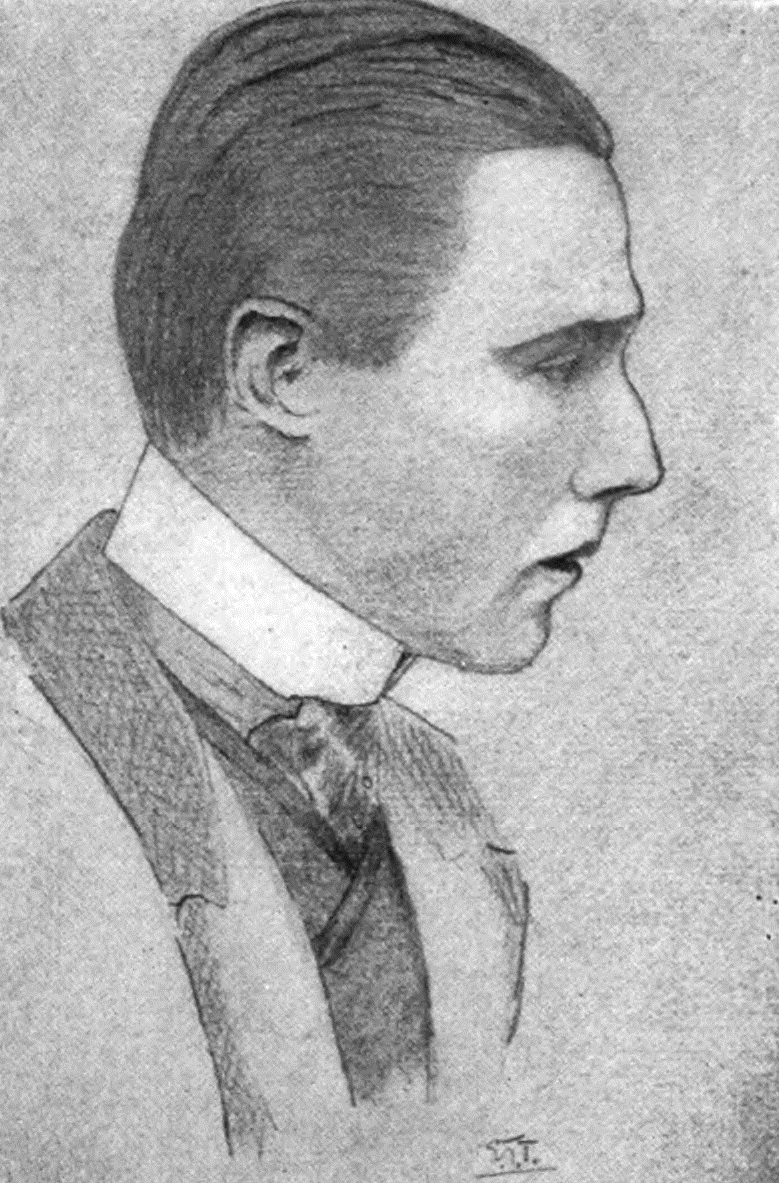
- Self-portrait
- Born: Ernest Charles Temple Thurston; 23 September 1879; Halesworth, Suffolk, England
- Died: 19 March 1933 (aged 53); Maida Vale, Paddington, London, England
- Spouses: Katherine Cecil Madden (m. 1901; div. 1910) Joan Katherine Cann (m. 1911; div. 1924) Emily Cowlin (m. 1925)

Ernest Charles Temple Thurston (23 September 1879 – 19 March 1933) was a British poet, playwright and author.

== Biography ==
Thurston was born in Halesworth, Suffolk, England, the youngest of four children of brewery manager Frank Joseph Thurston and his wife Georgina Temple. The family moved from Halesworth to Maidstone and then, after the death of Georgina in 1895, left England to live with Thurston Snr's mother in Ballintemple, Cork. Thurston began his writing career with the publication of two books of poems when he was sixteen, followed two years later by The Apple of Eden.

It was while in Cork that Ernest met Katherine Cecil Madden, (1875–1911). She was older than her partner and had already enjoyed success as a journalist and novelist. The couple later married. After living in various places, the couple settled in a house in Kensington, with visits to their country cottage at Ardmore, Ireland. They lived together happily for some years and were known in literary circles, with Thurston adapting some of his wife's novels for the stage. Temple Thurston's marriage did not last. The couple separated when he moved out in 1907, and their divorce was formalised in 1910. In September of the following year she was found dead in bed in a private hotel in Cork as the result of a seizure.

For many years, Temple Thurston found it difficult to make a living from writing and worked as a yeast merchant, brewer, research chemist, and commercial traveller before finally becoming a reporter. His first novel, The Apple of Eden was issued in a rewritten form in 1905, but it was not until the success of The City of Beautiful Nonsense, published by Newnes in 1909, that he found some kind of stability.

In November 1924, Temple Thurston's second marriage ended. Joan Katherine (née Cann), whom he had married a year after his first divorce, told the divorce court that they had lived happily together until 1922, when her husband had engaged a private secretary, Emily Cowlin. Objecting to the fact that the two of them were "on friendly terms", Mrs Thurston left for a holiday in India, hoping that it would give her husband time to "get over it". While there, she received news that Emily Cowlin was expecting a baby. The following summer Temple Thurston married Emily Cowlin at Kensington Register Office. It had been kept secret and only six people attended. Afterwards, the couple slipped away in a car before crowds had time to gather.

Thurston wrote a total of forty books, from which seventeen motion pictures were made. In addition, he authored several theatrical plays, three of which were performed on Broadway and four of which were made into motion pictures. His best-known work for the stage is The Wandering Jew, a play based on the legend written in four parts, which was performed on Broadway in 1921. The play was adapted for a silent film of the same name in 1923, and a sound remake was released in 1933. His third wife, Emily, published the play as a novel in 1934.

At the end of February 1933, Thurston was taken ill after a game of golf in Rye. He was diagnosed with lumbago and influenza, symptoms further complicated by pneumonia, and he died at his home in Maida Vale on 19 March 1933. His wife, Emily, died in 1984.

== Books ==
Thurston's most successful books include The City of Beautiful Nonsense (1909) and The Flower of Gloster (1911), a story about a canal journey in England. Two film versions of The City of Beautiful Nonsense were made: a silent version in 1919, and a sound version in 1935.

In 1929, a play he had adapted from his book Portrait of a Spy was banned by the Lord Chamberlain. Based on the WWI exploits of Dutch spy Mata Hari, the play had been set to open at the London Coliseum until the ban was announced a couple of weeks before. Since the book itself had attracted little controversy, Temple Thurston suspected that the establishment had had some late thoughts about offending the French, who had executed the spy.

== Legacy ==
In 1967, Granada Television broadcast a 13-part children's serial called The Flower of Gloster, an updated version of Thurston's original. The serial was followed a few years later by a book of the same name, authored by the serial's producer Bill Grundy.

== Bibliography ==
- The Apple of Eden (Chapman & Hall, 1905)
- The Evolution of Katherine (1905)
- Traffic, The story of a faithful woman (George Newnes, 1906)
- The Realist & other stories (Sisley's Ltd, 1906)
- Mirage (Methuen, 1908)
- The City of Beautiful Nonsense (Newnes, 1909)
- The Apple of Eden (1910)
- The Greatest Wish in the World (Chapman & Hall, 1910)
- Sally Bishop, a Romance (1910)
- The Patchwork Papers (Chapman & Hall, 1910)
- The Garden of Resurrection (Chapman & Hall, 1911)
- The Flower of Gloster (Chapman & Hall, 1911)
- The Antagonists (George Newnes, 1912)
- Thirteen (short stories) (Chapman & Hall, 1912)
- Digressions: being passages from the works of E. Temple Thurston, collected and arranged by Bellwattle (Chapman & Hall, 1912)
- The Open Window (Chapman & Hall, 1913)
- The Achievement of Richard Furlong (Chapman & Hall, 1913)
- The Achievement (Chapman & Hall, 1914)
- The Passionate Crime; a tale of a faerie (Chapman & Hall, 1915)
- Tares (Chapman & Hall, 1915)
- The Five-barred Gate (Hodder & Stoughton, 1916)
- Enchantment (T. Fisher Unwin, 1917)
- Summer 1917 & other verses (Chapman & Hall, 1917)
- Over the Hill (Chapman & Hall, 1917)
- The Nature of the Beast (1918)
- David & Jonathan (Hutchinson, 1918)
- Sheepskins & Grey Russet (Cassell, 1919)
- The Forest Fire and other stories (Cassell, 1919)
- The World of Wonderful Reality (Hodder & Stoughton, 1919)
- The Green Bough (Cassell, 1921)
- The Eye of the Wift (Cassell, 1922)
- The Miracle (Hutchison, 1922)
- May Eve etc (Appleton, 1923)
- Poems 1918–1923 (Putnam, 1923)
- Charmeuse (Cassell, 1924)
- Mr Bottleby Does Something (Cassell, 1925)
- The Goose-feather Bed (Putnam, 1926)
- The Rosetti & Other Tales (Cassell, 1926)
- Jane Carroll (Putnam, 1927)
- Millennium (Cassell, 1927)
- Come and Listen (Putnam, 1927)
- Portrait of a Spy (Cassell, 1929)
- The Rosicrucian (Putnam, 1930)
- Man in a Black Hat (Putnam, 1930; republished by Valancort Books in 2015 under the title Man in a Black Hat)
- The Broken Heart (1932)
- A Hank of Hair (Cassell, 1932)
- The Diamond Pendant (1932)
- John Boddy. Leaves from a constable's notebook (Ward Lock, 1932)
- Discord (Ernest Benn, 1933
- The Flower of Gloster (David & Charles, 1974)

== Plays ==
- Sally Bishop (Prince of Wales, 1911)
- The Greatest Wish (1912)
- The Cost (1914)
- The Greatest Wish (Garrick, 1913)
- Driven (Haymarket, 1914)
- Ollaya (1916)
- The Wandering Jew (New Theatre, 1921)
- Judas Iscariot (1923)
- A Roof and Four Walls, a comedy in four acts (1923)
- The Blue Peter (1924)
- Snobs; a farcical comedy in one act (1925)
- Mr. Bottleby Does Something (1925)
- Emma Hamilton (1929)
- Charmeuse (1930)
- Son of Man (1933)

== Films ==
- The City of Beautiful Nonsense (1919)
- The Garden of Resurrection (1919)
- Sunken Rocks (1920)
- David and Jonathan (1921)
- Enchantment (1921)
- The Blue Peter (1928) (Scenario by Vivian Thompson)
