= Prison Breaker =

1936 film

- Directed by: Adrian Brunel
- Written by: Edgar Wallace (novel); Frank Witty
- Produced by: George Smith
- Starring: James Mason; Marguerite Allan; Wally Patch; Andrews Engelmann
- Cinematography: George Stretton
- Production company: George Smith Productions
- Distributed by: Columbia Pictures
- Release date: February 1936
- Running time: 70 minutes
- Country: United Kingdom
- Language: English

Prison Breaker is a 1936 British crime drama film directed by Adrian Brunel and starring James Mason, Wally Patch, Marguerite Allan and George Merritt. The film was based on a novel by Edgar Wallace; its plot concerns a British secret service agent who falls in love with the daughter of a criminal.

== Plot ==
A British secret service agent falls in love with the daughter of a leading London criminal, and soon after becoming involved with her father finds himself in prison facing a charge of manslaughter.

== Cast ==
- James Mason as 'Bunny' Barnes
- Marguerite Allan as Veronica
- Wally Patch as Villars
- Andrews Engelmann as Stiegelman
- Ian Fleming as Stephen Shand
- George Merritt as Goldring
- Vincent Holman as Jackman
- Tarva Penna as Macallum
- Aubrey Mallalieu as Sir Douglas Mergin
- Neville Brook as Lord Beldam
- Andreas Malandrinos as Supello
