= A Taxi to Paradise =

- Binnie Barnes and Jane Carr in the film
- Directed by: Adrian Brunel
- Written by: Graham Hope (play); Adrian Brunel
- Produced by: Harry Cohen; A. George Smith
- Starring: Binnie Barnes; Garry Marsh; Henry Wilcoxon
- Production company: George Smith Enterprises
- Distributed by: Fox Film Company
- Release date: February 1933
- Running time: 44 minutes
- Country: United Kingdom
- Language: English

A Taxi to Paradise is a 1933 British comedy film directed by Adrian Brunel and starring Binnie Barnes, Garry Marsh and Henry Wilcoxon. It was made as a quota quickie at Wembley Studios.

== Preservation status ==
The British Film Institute National Archive holds a collection of stills but no film or video materials.

== Plot ==
Joan Melhuish, a young married woman, tires of her husband George's constant unfaithfulness and leaves him to move in with an admirer, a young poet named Tom Fanshawe. Fanshawe has rented a flat from his friend, Stephen Randall, who happens to be a friend of George's. George unexpectedly arrives at the very same flat with his latest conquest, a model named Claire. The tension is broken when Randall suddenly returns from abroad. Discovering that he and Joan are already casual acquaintances, Joan decides to go out with him, leaving George, Fanshawe, and Claire to their own devices.

== Cast ==
- Binnie Barnes as Joan Melhuish
- Garry Marsh as George Melhuish
- Henry Wilcoxon as Stephen Randall
- Jane Carr as Claire
- Sebastian Shaw as Tom Fanshawe
- Picot Schooling as Manson
- Vincent Holman as Dunning

== Reception ==
Film Weekly wrote: "A weak and fundamentally unpleasant story of a marital mix-up, redeemed at odd moments by the commonsense acting of Gary Marsh. Poor stuff. If this Fox quota a picture were not so negligible as entertainment it would leave a definitely nasty taste in the mouth. It treats connubial relationship in the worst manner of the low-class music-hall.

Kine Weekly wrote: "A lively marital trifle, rather suggestive in its dialogue and situations, but containing a certain broad wit which should appeal to the masses. The team work is good and the staging is not without the modern touch. ... Adrian Brunel's treatment of the spicy story is a little lacking in imagination and subtlety, and there are times when the proceedings dangerously approach the border line."

Picturegoer wrote: "A light, airy trifle which is spicy without being particularly subtle. ... There is a certain broad wit which is quite well put over, and the acting of Binnie Barnes is quite effective."
