= Sunset in Vienna =

- Theatrical release poster
- Directed by: Norman Walker
- Written by: Marjorie Gaffney; Harrison Owen; Florence Tranter
- Produced by: Herbert Wilcox
- Starring: Tullio Carminati; Lilli Palmer; John Garrick
- Cinematography: Freddie Young
- Edited by: Merrill G. White
- Music by: Geraldo
- Production company: Herbert Wilcox Productions
- Distributed by: General Film Distributors
- Release date: 1937
- Running time: 73 minutes
- Country: United Kingdom
- Language: English

Sunset in Vienna (also known as Suicide Legion) is a 1937 British musical drama film directed by Norman Walker and starring Tullio Carminati, Lilli Palmer and John Garrick. It was written by Marjorie Gaffney, Harrison Owen and Florence Tranter, and was made at Pinewood Studios. A shortened version of the film was released in the United States in 1940 and this year and running time are sometimes listed.

== Plot ==
An Italian officer marries an Austrian, but the outbreak of the First World War devastates their relationship.

== Cast ==
- Tullio Carminati as Capt. Antonio 'Toni' Baretti
- Lilli Palmer as Gelda Sponek
- John Garrick as Lt. Adolphe Sponek
- Geraldine Hislop as Wanda
- Davina Craig as deaf lady
- Hubert Harben as Austrian general
- Edgar Driver as Alfred
- Alice O'Day as Maddalena
- Eileen Munro as Superintendent of V.A.D.
- Patrick Barr as Ludwig
- Peter Bull as Turk outside café
- Katie Johnson as woman in café
- Andreas Malandrinos as café manager
- Julian Vedey as Candiani

== Reception ==
Kine Weekly wrote: "Sectacular war-time romantic drama turning on national enmity and embellished with song. The story seldom deviates from the obvious, but it covers an immense amount of colourful ground, is compelling in its love interest, and has the advantage of a first-rate cast. By appealing to the eye, the ear and the senses, it countenances no neglect of the essentials."

The Daily Film Renter wrote: "Tullio Carminati is well cast as Toni, a role he enlivens with engaging touches of audacity. His handling of occasional songs is also quite pleasant. Lilli Palmer cleverly succeeds in making Gelda almost convincing, her work being particularly fine in the more emotional passages. John Garrick appears as Adolph, and the comedy is in the capable hands of Edgar Driver, who is never at a loss for some bright specimen of cockney wit."

Picture Show wrote: "Tullio Carminati gives an attractive performance as the gay, happy-go-lucky Italian, and Lilli Palmer is delightful as the impulsive Austrian girl, Gelda ... The settings are charming and convincing, and the photography excellent."

Variety wrote: "Sunset in Vienna has a smattering of most of the ingredients thar go to make up a successful film. ... Not a very original story, but its treatment is of a very high order."
