= A Romance of Seville =

1929 film

- Directed by: Norman Walker
- Written by: Arline Lord; Alma Reville; Garnett Weston
- Starring: Alexander D'Arcy; Marguerite Allan; Randle Ayrton; Cecil Barry
- Cinematography: Claude Friese-Greene
- Production company: British International Pictures
- Distributed by: Pathé Pictures
- Release dates: May 1929; July 1930 (sound version)
- Running time: 62 minutes
- Country: United Kingdom
- Languages: Sound (Synchronized); English Intertitles

The Romance of Seville (1929) by Norman Walker

A Romance of Seville is a 1929 British sound color drama film directed by Norman Walker and starring Alexander D'Arcy, Marguerite Allan and Cecil Barry. This was the first British sound film released in colour, using the Pathéchrome stencil-colouring process. While the film has no audible dialog, it features a synchronized musical score, singing and sound effects on the soundtrack. The film is also known by the alternative title The Romance of Seville.

== Cast ==
- Alexander D'Arcy as Ramon
- Marguerite Allan as Pepita
- Randle Ayrton as Estavian
- Cecil Barry as Estaban
- Hugh Eden as Juan
- Eugenie Amami as Dolores

== Music ==
The film features a theme song entitled "Pepita" which was composed by Hubert Bath and Harry Stafford.

== See also ==
- List of early color feature films
- List of lost films

== Bibliography ==
- Mundy, John. The British musical film. Manchester University Press, 2007.
