= Have Guns — Will Haggle =

- The Avengers episode
- Episode no.: Season 6 Episode 12
- Directed by: Ray Austin
- Written by: Donald James (teleplay)
- Original air dates: 1 May 1968 (ABC, US); 11 December 1968 (Thames, UK)

Guest appearances
- Johnny Sekka; Nicola Pagett

Episode chronology
| ← Previous "Look - (Stop Me If You've Heard This One) But There Were These Two Fellers..." | Next → "They Keep Killing Steed" |

"Have Guns — Will Haggle" is the twelfth episode of the sixth series of the 1960s cult British spy-fi television series The Avengers, starring Patrick Macnee and Linda Thorson. Its first broadcast was on the US ABC network on 1 May 1968. Its first UK broadcast was on 11 December 1968 by Thames Television, who commissioned this series of the show for the ITV network. The episode was directed by Ray Austin and written by Donald James.

== Plot ==
Three thousand top-secret and super-powerful FF70 rifles are stolen and come up on the black market for auction. In order to thwart the power-hungry Col. Nsonga, Steed decides to try and outbid him. There is an added incentive: the winner also decides the fate of the captured Tara.

== Cast ==
- Patrick Macnee as John Steed
- Linda Thorson as Tara King
- Johnny Sekka as Col. Nsonga
- Nicola Pagett as Adriana
- Jonathan Burn as Conrad
- Timothy Bateson as Spencer
- Michael Turner as Crayford
- Robert Gillespie as Lift Attendant
- Peter J. Elliott as Brad
- Joe Dunne as Smith
- Frank Maher as Mercenary 1
- Terence Plummer as Mercenary 2
- Rocky Taylor as Mercenary 3

== Production ==
Filmed between October 1967 and February 1968, "Have Guns — Will Haggle" started as the pilot episode of the sixth series of The Avengers. In its original conception, entitled "Invitation to a Killing", it ran for 90 minutes and introduced the character of Tara King. As with Steed's previous companions, the intention was to introduce Tara as already working with Steed. However, when original producer John Bryce was replaced by Albert Fennell and Brian Clemens, they decided to begin the series with "The Forget-Me-Knot" which explicitly introduced the character, so "Have Guns — Will Haggle" was moved to midway through the run. As such, it was edited down to the usual length of around 50 minutes.
