= Kathleen O'Regan =

Irish actress (1903–1970)

- Publicity still for The Shadow Between (1931)
- Born: Elizabeth Kathleen Melvin; 11 November 1899; Greencastle, Kilkeel, County Down, Ireland
- Died: 10 December 1970 (aged 71); Milford-on-Sea, Hampshire, England
- Other names: Elizabeth Kathleen Plimpton, Kathleen Oregan
- Occupation: Actress
- Spouse(s): Lt Colonel K.A. Plimpton, DSO

Kathleen O'Regan (11 November 1903 – 10 December 1970), born Elizabeth Kathleen Melvin, was an Irish actress, born in Co. Down best remembered for her roles in the first London performances of Juno and the Paycock and The Plough and the Stars.

== Career ==
O'Regan made her West End debut in a production of Persevering Pat. She was in the first London productions of the Sean O'Casey plays Juno and the Paycock and The Plough and the Stars. She starred in Gregorio Martinez Sierra's The Kingdom of God in 1927, in A Night in June, Young Woodley, and Tinker Tailor in 1928, and in comedies including the farce Two Deep in 1930. A 1928 reviewer noted that O'Regan "has already a personality that can express and convey emotion, fine eyes, repose, and beautiful movement," while suggesting that she "learn our silly way of speaking English if she is to play English parts."

O'Regan also appeared in films, including Alfred Hitchcock's screen rendering of Juno and the Paycock (1930), and the all-Irish film Ireland Through the Ages (1930), The Shadow Between (1931), Fires of Fate (1932), and Rose of Tralee (1938). On radio, she was heard in adaptations including The Four Feathers.

O'Regan was considered a stylish stage beauty. She endorsed Lux soap in print advertisements that highlighted her "satin-smooth" complexion. She continued on the stage through the 1930s and into the 1940s, appearing in Eight Bells (1933), And a Woman Passed By... (1935) Ben Travers's farce Banana Ridge (1938), and The Crime of Margaret Foley (1947).

== Personal life ==
In April 1926, O'Regan married World War I veteran, sportsman, and actor Kelburne Archibald Plimpton, DSO, who was secretary of the Garrick Club. She died in 1970, aged 67, in Milford-on-Sea in Hampshire.

== Filmography ==
Year	Film	Role	Other notes
1930	Juno and the Paycock	Mary Boyle	
1931	The Shadow Between	Margaret Haddon	
1932	Fires of Fate	Nora Belmont	
1938	Rose of Tralee	Mary O'Malley	
1941	Man at the Gate	Ruth	
1943	Thursday's Child	Ellen Wilson	
