= Clifford David =

American actor (1928–2017)

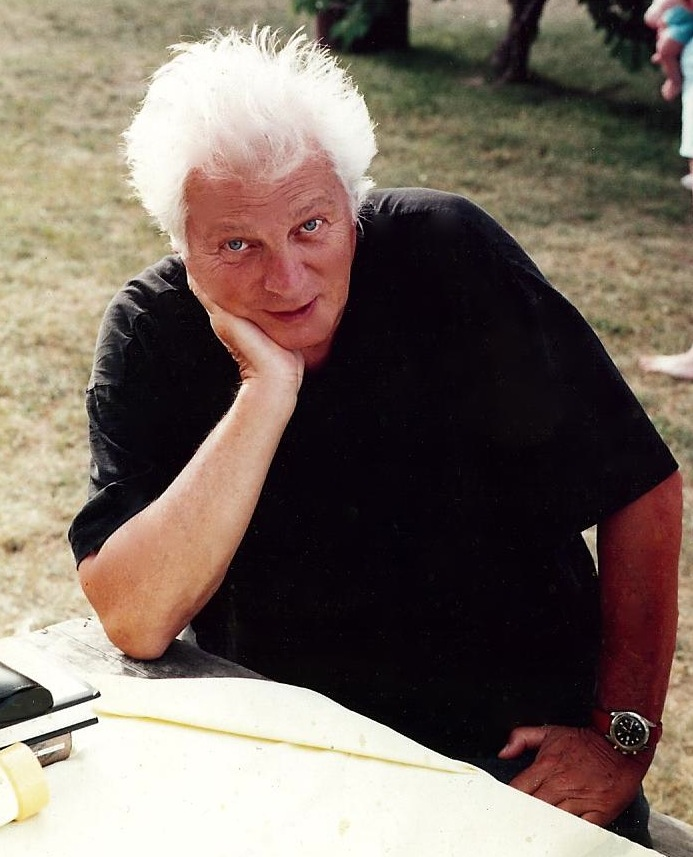
- David in 2007
- Born: June 30, 1928; Toledo, Ohio, United States
- Died: November 30, 2017 (aged 89); Los Angeles, California, U.S.
- Occupations: Actor, singer
- Years active: 1953–2017

Clifford David (June 30, 1928 – November 30, 2017) was an American actor, singer, and coach. His career began in the 1950s, with early live television appearances leading to roles in Broadway musicals. He also played character roles in television series, feature films, and theatre.

== Early life ==
David was born in Toledo, Ohio, the youngest son of Farris and Lily (née Abdow). His uncle was Syrian Orthodox Metropolitan Samuel David of Toledo.

== Career ==
A protégé of Lee Strasberg, David made his Broadway debut as Scipio in Albert Camus' Caligula directed by Sidney Lumet. He also played Pasquale in The Aspern Papers, directed by Margaret Webster, Antipholus in the 1963 Off-Broadway revival The Boys from Syracuse, Laertes in Joseph Papp's Hamlet, and Lord Byron in the Lincoln Center production of Tennessee Williams' Camino Real with Al Pacino.

A member of the Motion Picture Academy of Arts and Sciences, Clifford's filmography includes Invitation to a Gunfighter (1964), Resurrection, and M. Night Shyamalan's Signs (2002). As an accomplished pianist, he was cast as Beethoven in Bill & Ted's Excellent Adventure (1989).

A member of the Actors Studio from 1962, David worked with many of the greats of American theater, film, and television. He told stories of drinking with Richard Burton and shopping with Marilyn Monroe. He was working with Monroe on a play entitled The Cat, adapted from a Colette novel by Arthur Miller, when she died.

David was featured in the principal casts and on the original studio albums of such Broadway musicals as Wildcat with Lucille Ball, 1776, with William Daniels, Alan Jay Lerner's On a Clear Day You Can See Forever, and Andrew Lloyd Webber's Joseph and the Amazing Technicolor Dreamcoat.

Other feature film credits include The Last Mile (1959), The Party's Over (1965) with Oliver Reed, Riot (1969), The Betsy (1978), with Laurence Olivier, Fort Apache, The Bronx with Paul Newman (1981), and The Exorcist III (1990).

He was seen on television in the miniseries Blind Ambition, as well as in political dramas Fear on Trial and Missiles of October with Martin Sheen. He appeared in episodes of Bonanza, The Big Valley, Charlie's Angels, Mary Tyler Moore, Murphy Brown, Party of Five, Murder, She Wrote, Will & Grace, and Law & Order.

== Filmography ==
=== Film ===
Clifford David film credits
Year	Title	Role	Notes
1957	Street of Sinners	Tom	
1959	The Last Mile	Richard Walters	
1964	Invitation to a Gunfighter	Crane Adams	
1965	Hamlet	Laertes	
1965	The Party's Over	Carson	
1969	Riot	Mary Sheldon	
1978	The Betsy	Joe	
1980	Resurrection	George	
1981	Fort Apache, The Bronx	Dacey	
1986	Agent on Ice	Kirkpatrick	
1989	Bill & Ted's Excellent Adventure	Beethoven	
1990	The Exorcist III	Dr. Bruno	
1991	Pyrates	Advisor	
2002	Signs	Columbia University Professor	
2004	Kinsey	Professor Smithson	

=== Television ===
Clifford David television credits
Year	Title	Role	Notes
1969	The Big Valley	Bill Stokley / Rich Stokely	1 episode
1971	Ironside	Joe Julian	1 episode
1972	Bonanza	Mr. Evans	Episode: "The Hidden Enemy"
1974	The Mary Tyler Moore Show	David Boyd	1 episode
1974	The Missiles of October	Theodore Sorensen, White House Counsel	TV movie
1975	Fear on Trial	Hall	TV movie
1979	Blind Ambition	Fred Fielding	TV miniseries
1978	Charlie's Angels	Gordon Roclair	1 episode
1986	The Equalizer	Charles Webber	Episode: "Unpunished Crimes"
1995	Murder, She Wrote	Claude Faragere	1 episode
1996	Party of Five	Mr. Olmstead	1 episode
1998	Murphy Brown	Man	1 episode
2003	Will & Grace	Hotel Manager	1 episode
2001	Law & Order: Criminal Intent	Ralph Kozinski	Episode: "Art"
2005	Law & Order	Owswald Jackson	Episode: "Sects"
