= Hubert Harben =

English actor (1878–1941)

- still from 1938 theatre programme
- Born: Leonard Hubert S Harben; 12 July 1878; Hampstead, London, England
- Died: 24 August 1941 (aged 63); Leeds, West Riding of Yorkshire, England
- Occupation: Actor
- Years active: 1905–1941

Leonard Hubert S Harben (12 July 1878 – 24 August 1941) was an English stage and film actor. He was married to the actress Mary Jerrold and father of celebrity chef Philip Harben.

== Selected filmography ==
- Mr. Pim Passes By (1921)
- Every Mother's Son (1926)
- Tell England (1931)
- The Shadow Between (1931)
- Uneasy Virtue (1931)
- Fires of Fate (1932)
- Timbuctoo (1933)
- The House of Trent (1933)
- Lilies of the Field (1934)
- City of Beautiful Nonsense (1935)
- Scrooge (1935)
- Fighting Stock (1935)
- Whom the Gods Love (1936)
- Living Dangerously (1936)
- Dishonour Bright (1936)
- Sunset in Vienna (1937)
- For Valour (1937)
- Victoria the Great (1937)
- A Royal Divorce (1938)
- The Man at the Gate (1941)
