= Edna Davies =

British actress (1905–1969)

Edna Davies (1905–1969) was a British stage and film actress.

== Selected filmography ==
- The Hate Ship (1929)
- Spanish Eyes (1930)
- Song of Soho (1930)
- Loose Ends (1930)
- Sometimes Good (1934)
- Side Street Angel (1937)

== Theatre ==
She was a member of the original London performance cast of Arnold Ridley's The Ghost Train in 1925.
