= Antonia Brough =

English actress (1897–1937)

Antonia Brough (18 May 1897 – 4 November 1937) was a British actress born in Chelsea, London, England. She died in Kensington, England.

== Selected filmography ==
- The Farmer's Wife (1928)
- Under the Greenwood Tree (1929)
- Spanish Eyes (1930)
- Song of Soho (1930)
- Maria Marten, or The Murder in the Red Barn (1935)
- Dandy Dick (1935)
- The Tudor Touch (1937)
