= Stepping Stones (film) =

1931 film

- Directed by: Geoffrey Benstead
- Music by: Alec Alexander
- Production company: Geoffrey Benstead Films
- Distributed by: British Independent Exhibitors' Distributors
- Release date: June 1931
- Running time: 50 minutes
- Country: United Kingdom
- Language: English

Stepping Stones is a 1931 British musical film directed by Geoffrey Benstead. It was made at Isleworth Studios as a quota quickie. It is a revue-style show featuring a number of music hall performers.

== Cast ==
- Jade Hales as Lady
- George Bellamy as John
- Ethel Lodge as Joan
- Charles Paton as Suger Daddy
- Henderson and Lennox as Cabaret Boys
- Celia Bird as Romany Lady
- Pearl Hay P as Crinoline Baby
- Fred Rains
- Marguerite Allan
- Heather Thatcher
- Alec Alexander as Bandleader

== Bibliography ==
- Chibnall, Steve. Quota Quickies: The Birth of the British 'B' Film. British Film Institute, 2007.
- Low, Rachael. Filmmaking in 1930s Britain. George Allen & Unwin, 1985.
- Wood, Linda. British Films, 1927-1939. British Film Institute, 1986.
