= Loose Ends (1930 film) =

1930 film

- Directed by: Norman Walker
- Written by: Dion Titheradge (play); Norman Walker
- Starring: Edna Best; Owen Nares; Miles Mander
- Cinematography: Claude Friese-Greene
- Edited by: Sam Simmonds
- Music by: John Reynders
- Production company: British International Pictures
- Distributed by: Wardour Films
- Release date: 22 May 1930
- Running time: 95 minutes
- Country: United Kingdom
- Language: English
- Budget: $100,000
- Box office: $250,000

Loose Ends is a 1930 British drama film directed by Norman Walker and starring Edna Best, Owen Nares and Miles Mander. It was written by Walker and Dion Titheradge based on the latter's 1926 play, and made at Elstree Studios.

== Plot ==
Malcolm Ferres is down-and-out, and is accidentally knocked down by a car belonging to celebrated actress Nina Grant. Touched by his plight, she brings him into her world; the two eventually fall in love and, to the shock of the public, marry. However, the friction between her celebrity lifestyle and his view of life begins to pull them apart. When it is revealed that Malcolm is an ex-convict who served fifteen years for murder, he disappears from Nina's life to spare her the scandal. But she learns the truth behind his crime: he had killed a man whose betrayal had driven his sister to suicide. Moved by this insight into his character, she tracks him down, and the couple find happiness.

== Cast ==
- Edna Best as Nina Grant
- Owen Nares as Malcolm Ferres
- Miles Mander as Raymond Carteret
- Adrianne Allen as Brenda Fallon
- Donald Calthrop as Winton Penner
- Edna Davies as Deborah Price
- Sybil Arundale as Sally Britt
- J. Fisher White as Stranger
- Gerard Lyley as Cyril Gayling

== Reception ==
Film Weekly wrote: "The most gripping part of this exceptionally entertaining film is its clash of widely, varied characters, which, established early, continues right until the end of the picture. ... Here is a really good film which you will enjoy, even though there is too much talk and the adaptation from the stage-play is practically literal."

Kine Weekly wrote: "Owen Nares's first talking picture should be generally popular. It is excellently produced, acted and photographed. The story is a somewhat theatrical matrimonial one, but the dialogue is very well delivered and grips the interest all the time. ... There is a marked advance in British technique in this film, and the action flows easily and with excellent dramatic effect."

Picture Show wrote: "An excellent British Society drama."
