= Jonathan Burn (actor) =

British actor (born 1939)

- Born: Henry Jonas Jonathan Burn-Forti; 28 November 1939 (age 86); London, England
- Occupation: Actor
- Spouse: Marie Blackburn (m. 2002)

Jonathan Burn (born 28 November 1939) is a British actor.

== Life ==
Burn was born 28 November 1939 in London, England to an Austrian Jewish mother and an Italian Jewish father. The previous year, they had met and were married after coming to London as refugees. Sadly, Burn lost many of his relatives to concentration camps.

== Career ==
Burn trained at the Royal Central School of Speech and Drama from 1958 to 1961. He worked for some time with provincial repertory companies and then appeared in Androcles and the Lion and The Shewing Up of Blanko Posnet at the Mermaid Theatre. Burn also appeared in stage productions such as This Story of Yours by John Hopkins, Hank’s Night by Paul Ableman at Yvonne Arnaud Theatre, Guildford, and My Fat Friend at Civic Theatre in Johannesburg. He participated in a number of films, including The Party's Over (1965), Eyewitness (1970) and Blood from the Mummy's Tomb (1971). He appeared in British television series such as The Forsyte Saga, The Avengers, Crossroads and Doctor Who. Burn's last screen credit was in the drama miniseries Cambridge Spies in 2003.

== Selected filmography ==
=== Television ===
| Year | Title | Role | Notes |
|---|---|---|---|
| 1964 | Thursday Theatre | Mathias | Episode: "Point of Departure" |
| 1965 | The Wednesday Play | Bruno | Episode: "Auto-Stop" |
| 1967 | The Forsyte Saga | Val Dartie | 9 episodes |
| 1968 | The Avengers | Conrad | Episode: "Have Guns — Will Haggle" |
| 1969 | The Wednesday Play | 2nd Lt. Florence | Episode: "The Last Train through Harecastle Tunnel" |
| 1977 | Crossroads | Max Lorimer | Several episodes |
| 1981 | Play for Today | Spanish Guide | Episode: "The Cause" |
| 1982 | Q.E.D. | Lecours | Episode: "The Great Motor Race" |
| 1982 | Beau Geste | Colonna | 3 episodes |
| 1983 | Andy Robson | Harris | 2 episodes |
| 1984 | Minder | Boxing M.C. | Episode: "Rocky Eight and a Half" |
| 1984 | Ellis Island | Al Jolson | Episode 1 |
| 1988 | Doctor Who | Silas P. | Episode: "The Happiness Patrol: Part One" |
| 1989 | Mother Love | Chief Insp Strachan | Episode 3 |
| 1989 | Judith Krantz's Till We Meet Again | Nico Ambert | 2 episodes |
| 1990 | Screen Two | Pavlov | Episode: "Small Zones" |
| 1992 | The Good Guys | Merrison | Episode: "The MacQuarrie Treasure" |
| 1993 | The Last U-Boat | Admiral Brighton | TV film |
| 1995 | Shine on Harvey Moon | French Mechanic | Episode 5.11 |
| 1997 | EastEnders | Mr. Fox | Episode 1453 |
| 1998 | 2point4 Children | the Restaurant Manager | Episode: "The Italian Job" |
| 2003 | Cambridge Spies | Philip Statman | Episode 3 |
