= The Flower of Gloster =

1911 book by E. Temple Thurston

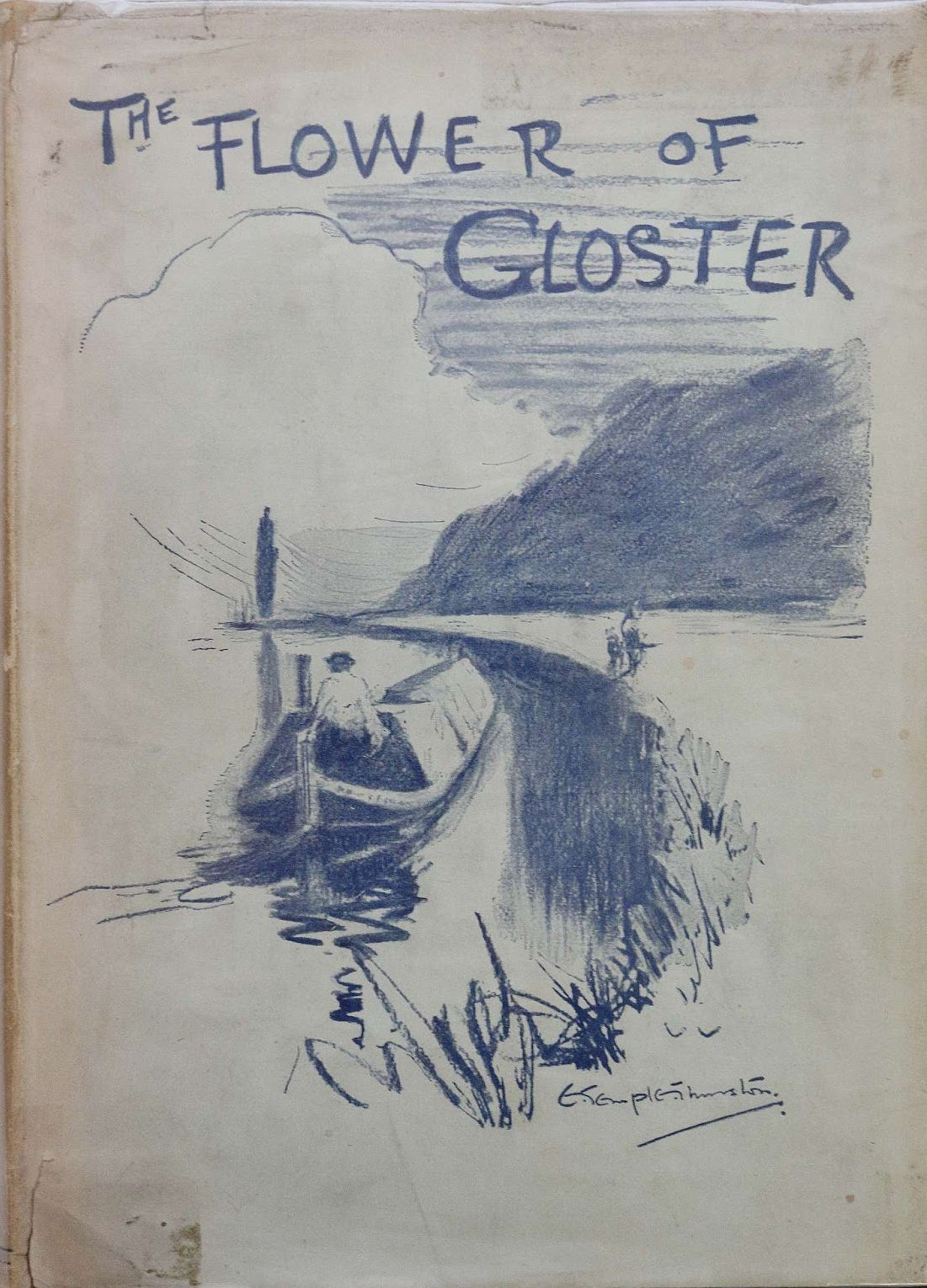
- 1st edition cover
- Author: E. Temple Thurston
- Illustrator: W.R. Dakin et al
- Subject: Canal Life
- Genre: Travel
- Set in: England
- Publisher: Williams & Norgate, Chapman & Hall et al
- Publication date: 1911
- Preceded by: The Patchwork Papers
- Followed by: The Open Window

The Flower of Gloster is a 1911 book by E. Temple Thurston. Published by Williams and Norgate, it sold well enough to merit a second edition two years later. A third unillustrated edition was published by Chapman and Hall in 1918, after which the book remained out of print for over half a century until being republished by David & Charles in 1968. A year before that, ITV had broadcast a 13-part children's serial of the same name loosely based on Thurston's original narrative.

== The book ==
Thurston's original book opens with the author dreaming of escape to the English countryside and trying to buy a narrowboat from which to see it. After meeting with scepticism and warnings about the unsavoury nature of canal people, he is advised to go to Oxford to view The Flower of Gloster. The boatyard owner, similarly sceptical, advises him to hire "some decent fellar with an horse, what'll look after yer going through the locks." He introduces him to Eynsham Harry who, after some protracted negotiations in The Nag's Head, agrees to be Thurston's guide and mentor.

Their journey takes them first along the Oxford Canal to just north of Banbury, where they join the sprawling network of Midlands canals. They head north through Warwick and Leamington Spa, but as they near the heavily industrialised landscape of the Black Country, Thurston begins to have some doubts about continuing and beseeches Eynsham Harry to turn the boat around and head back via the Stratford-upon-Avon Canal to the countryside.

At one point in the journey, Thurston abandoned the canal in order to walk along the River Avon to Evesham and Tewkesbury, where he met up again with Eynsham Harry and The Flower of Gloster. According to David Viner's analysis of the text, the seemingly simple circuit of Oxford–Banbury–Warwick–Stratford–Tewkesbury–Oxford would not have been as straightforward as the author portrays it. Viner questions whether the journey ever took place in its entirety or if the story was a composite of several journeys. Whatever the truth, Viner concluded that none of the doubts on the literal interpretation of the journey detract from the book's value as a 'good read', an example of Edwardian romanticism, or its influence on canal history which has now lasted over a century.

Chapters
1-21	22-41
1: The Discoverer	22: Pour Passer Doucement Ma Vie
2: Flower of Gloster	23: Hedgerow Philosophy
3: The Flower of Gloster (continued)	24: Warwick
4: Oxford	25: The Gate into the Black Country
5: Oxford (continued)	26: The Stratford-on-Avon Canal
6: Joseph Phipkin – Owner	27: Lowson Ford
7: The Bargain	28: Yarningdale Farm
8: The Beginning of the Journey	29: The Compleat Angler
9: John Aikin and Anna Laetitia	30: Preston Bagot
10: Why I Would Like it to have been Anna Laetitia	31:A Cure for Trippers
11: Shipton-on-Cherwell	32: An Old Nunnery
12: Shipton-on-Cherwell (continued)	33: Fladbury Mill
13: Shipton-on-Cherwell (continued)	34: Wool Gathering
14: Somerton	35: Apple Blossom
15: The Trade in Old Bits	36: Tewkesbury
16: Cropredy	37: The Golden Valley
17: The First Patchwork Quilt – Cropredy	38: The Golden Valley (continued)
18: The Red Lion – Cropredy	39: Hard Boiled Eggs
19: The History of Cropredy	40: Dietetics
20: The Spare Bootlace	41: The Last Lock
21: School Days	

Editions
Date	Publisher	Notes
1911	Williams and Norgate	First Edition. Illustrated by W.R. Dakin.
1912	Dodd, Mead &Co.	US edition. Illustrated by W.R. Dakin.
1913	Williams and Norgate	2nd Edition. Illustrated by W.R. Dakin.
1918	Chapman and Hall	3rd Edition. Unillustrated.
1968	David & Charles	4th Edition. Illustrated with Thurston's original photos.
1970	Rupert Hart-Davis	Bill Grundy, TV tie-in. Illustrated with stills from the TV serial.
1972	David & Charles	5th Edition. Illustrated with Thurston's original photos.
1984	Alan Sutton Publishing	6th Edition. Illustrated with Thurston's original photos and contemporary sources. With an introduction and commentary by museums and archaeology consultant David Viner.
2004	Ronald Crowhurst	In The Wake of The Flower of Gloster: A Reconstruction of Temple Thurston's Historic Canal Journey of 1911, is a large-format photo book by Scottish art historian John Kemplay.

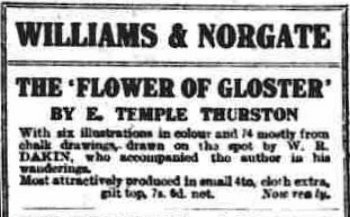
Advert for original edition

== Influence ==
Setting down his own experiences thirty years later in his book Narrow Boat, historian L.T.C. Rolt referred to The Flower of Gloster with delight, saying that it held pride of place in his own tiny collection of canal literature, the only professional account to have appeared in the previous fifty years.

== Illustrations ==
The 1911 edition of Flower of Gloster included six watercolour scenes and numerous line drawings, all by Scottish artist W.R. Dakin and based on the author's photographs. The illustrations appear to have been a large part of the book's appeal, and in its review of 'a delightful book' The Westminster Gazette said that the illustrations were 'among the sincerest, most spontaneous and charming ever seen in modern books'. The Scotsman's reviewer noted that the book's value was heightened by 'the excellent sketches by W.R. Dakin in black and white and colours'. Dakin was a contributor to The Bookman, a monthly review magazine. As editor of the 1968 David & Charles edition, L.T.C. Rolt dropped Dakin's watercolours in favour of eight of Temple Thurston's original photographs. The photographs were kept for the 1984 book, mixed in with many more contemporary photographs which editor David Viner thought gave Temple Thurston's account a 'period feel' as it was a time of great activity for photographers recording social life and customs for use as postcards.

== American edition ==
An American edition was published by Dodd, Mead and Company in 1912. The US version was identical to the first British editions apart from the original ‘Art Deco’ cover, which was changed to include an illustration of a boat more in tune with the American concept of a canal barge

== TV serial ==
In 1967, Granada TV broadcast a 13-part children's serial called The Flower of Gloster, loosely based on Thurston's original. When their boatyard owner father is taken ill, his eldest son Dick, accompanied by siblings 10-year-old Michael and 12-year-old Elizabeth, volunteers to deliver a narrow-boat – The Flower of Gloster - to a buyer on his behalf. During their 220-mile trip south they make new friends, face dangers and difficulties, played out against the changing patterns of the British countryside. Their course winds its way from Wales, through the inland waterways of England to the Pool of London at Tower Bridge.

It was the first Granada TV series to be filmed in colour (though initially transmitted in black and white). Professional actors Richard O'Callaghan and Annette Robertson, were cast alongside real-life siblings Elizabeth and Mike Doherty playing the younger children. Also appearing were many of the real-life canal folk, by then an almost extinct as a breed.

The TV serial was followed a few years later by a book of the same name, authored by the producer Bill Grundy. Grundy intended the series to be educational as much as adventure, with information about geology and wildlife. He claimed to have got the idea after visiting a rally near his home in Marple.

=== List of Episodes ===
No.	Title	Original release date
1	"The Accident"	27 September 1967
2	"The Cut"	4 October 1967
3	"The Boy"	11 October 1967
4	"The Girl"	18 October 1967
5	"Betton Woods"	25 October 1967
6	"The Dog"	1 November 1967
7	"Lost!"	8 November 1967
8	"The City"	15 November 1967
9	"Life and Death"	22 November 1967
10	"The Tunnel"	29 November 1967
11	"The Deadline"	6 December 1967
12	"The Hitch"	13 December 1967
13	"Late!"	20 December 1967
