= Under the Greenwood Tree (1929 film) =

1929 film

- Directed by: Harry Lachman
- Written by: Monckton Hoffe; Harry Lachman; Frank Launder; Rex Taylor
- Based on: Under the Greenwood Tree by Thomas Hardy
- Starring: Marguerite Allan; Nigel Barrie; Wilfred Shine
- Cinematography: Claude Friese-Greene
- Edited by: Emile de Ruelle
- Music by: Hubert Bath; John Reynders
- Production company: British International Pictures
- Distributed by: Wardour Films
- Release date: 5 September 1929
- Running time: 100 minutes
- Country: United Kingdom
- Languages: Sound (Part-Talkie); English

Under the Greenwood Tree is a 1929 British sound part-talkie historical drama film directed by Harry Lachman and starring Marguerite Allan, Nigel Barrie and Wilfred Shine. It is an adaptation of the 1872 novel Under the Greenwood Tree by Thomas Hardy.

== Production and release ==
The film's sets were designed by Wilfred Arnold. It was made at Elstree Studios by the leading British company of the era British International Pictures. It was originally intended to be a silent film, but following the arrival of sound, songs and dialogue were added using the RCA system. It was released in September 1929, around the same time as The American Prisoner, both films following on from the company's first sound release, Alfred Hitchcock's Blackmail, in June.

A review in Close Up suggested it "has perhaps the best direction yet produced from a British studio".

== Cast ==
- Marguerite Allan as Fancy Day
- Nigel Barrie as Shinar
- John Batten as Dick Dewey
- Maud Gill as Old Maid
- Wilfred Shine as Parson Maybold
- Roberta Abel as Penny
- Antonia Brough as Maid
- Tom Coventry as Tranter Dewey
- Robison Page as Grandfather Dewey
- Tubby Phillips as Tubby
- Bill Shine as Leaf
- Peggie Robb-Smith as Allan
- Queenie Leighton as Uncredited

== See also ==
- List of early sound feature films (1926–1929)

== Bibliography ==
- Low, Rachael. History of the British Film, 1918–1929. George Allen & Unwin, 1971.
- Wood, Linda. British Films, 1927-1939. British Film Institute, 1986.
