= Annette Robertson =

English actress (born 1940)

- Born: 1940 (age 85–86); Ilford, Essex, England
- Occupation: Actress
- Years active: 1960–1988
- Spouse: John Hurt (m. 1962; div. 1964)

Annette Robertson (born 1940) is an English former film and television actress.

== Career ==
She appeared in several films in her early twenties, including A Kind of Loving (1962), Spare the Rod and The Young Ones (both 1961), appearing with Cliff Richard in the latter. She played Fran in the British film The Party's Over (1965).

From 1962 up to the mid 1980s, Robertson worked regularly in television, appearing in series such as Coronation Street, No Hiding Place and Doctor Who. She last appeared onscreen in 1988, in an episode of Boon, after which she left the acting industry.

== Personal life ==
From 1962 to 1964, she was married to actor John Hurt.

== Filmography ==
Television
Programme	Episode	Role	Year	Notes
Boon	Charity Begins at Home	Sheba (tramp)	1988	
Shroud for a Nightingale		Morag Smith	1984	
Why Didn't They Ask Evans?		Julie	1980	
The Light Princess		Maid	1978	
Clouds of Glory	The Rime of the Ancient Mariner	Servant	1978	
Angels	Celebration	Vera	1976	
Couples		Mrs Jamieson	1976	
Shades of Greene	When Greek Meets Greek	Elizabeth	1974	
Owen, M.D.	The Witch of Addington	Melinda	1973	
The Woodlanders			1970	
Germinal	Trapped	Catherine	1970	
Joanna		Maid	1968	
Coronation Street		Pamela Dickenson	1968	
The Flower of Gloster		Ann	1967	
Sanctuary	Keep Him Till I Come For Him	Edna	1967	
Write A Play	A Question of Moral Values; To sleep perchance to dream	Annette Robertson	1963; 1967	
Armchair Theatre	Any Number Can Play; A Jug of Bread; A Way of Living	Joanna; Anna; Brenda		
Thirty-Minute Theatre	They Put You Where You Are	Shirley	1966	
The Wednesday Play	Barlowe of the Car Park	Linda	1966	
Doctor Who	The Massacre of St Bartholomew's Eve	Anne Chaplet	1966	
Blackmail	Stockbrokers Are Smashing – But Bankers Are Better	Dorice	1965	
Out of the Unknown	Andover and the Android	Lydia	1965	
Love Story	Briefly Kiss the Loser	Bubbles Garitty	1965	
Monitor	Always on Sunday; The Debussy Film	Alfred Jarry; Gaby Dupont	1965	
The Villains	A Joker for Your Button Hole	Susan	1965	
Theatre 625	Parade's End #1: Some Do Not	Gertie	1964	
Story Parade	The Bender	Gillian	1964	
Play of the Week	A Tricycle Made for Two	Betty	1964	
The Larkins	Beatle Drive	Judy	1963	
The Odd Man	The Sheep 'neath the Snow	Vera	1963	
ITV Television Playhouse	The Jokers	Lou	1962	
No Hiding Place	The Common Nurder	Di Williams	1962	
Probation Officer	Ep #4.6	Shiley Chapman	1962	
Studio 4	The Second Curtain	Marjorie	1962	
Z-Cars	A Stab in the Dark	Girl in pub	1962	
Police Surgeon	Lag on the Run	Molly	1960	

Films
Film	Role	Year	Notes
The Party's Over	Fran	1965	
A Kind of Loving	Phoebe	1962	
The Young Ones	Barbara	1961	
Spare the Rod	Doris	1961	
Four Winds Island	Leila	1961	
