= Matinee Idol (film) =

1933 film

- Miles Mander, Camilla Horn and Marguerite Allan in a scene from the film.
- Directed by: George King
- Written by: Charles Bennett; John Quin
- Produced by: Bray Wyndham
- Starring: Camilla Horn; Miles Mander; Marguerite Allan
- Cinematography: Eric Cross
- Edited by: David Lean
- Music by: Arthur Dulay
- Production company: Wyndham Productions
- Distributed by: United Artists
- Release date: March 1933
- Running time: 75 minutes
- Country: United Kingdom
- Language: English

Matinee Idol is a 1933 British crime film directed by George King and starring Camilla Horn, Miles Mander and Marguerite Allan. It was written by Charles Bennett and John Quin, and shot as a quota quickie at Wembley Studios in London, with sets designed by the art director J. Elder Wills. It was distributed by United Artists.

== Plot ==
A young actress is suspected of murder when a matinee idol she had prevented seducing her sister is found dead.

== Cast ==
- Camilla Horn as Sonia Vance
- Miles Mander as Harley Travers
- Marguerite Allan as Christine Vance
- Viola Keats as Gladys Wheeler
- Anthony Hankey as Sir Brian Greville
- Hay Petrie as Mr Clappit
- Margaret Yarde as Mrs Clappit
- Barry Livesey as Bert
- John Turnbull as Inspector North
- Albert Whelan as Barlow

== Reception ==
The Daily Film Renter wrote: "Action drags in plot that is rather frail, despite considerable elaboration. Uninspired direction and miscasting in principal roles are defects. Film has too much irrelevant matter introduced, but humour of character parts helps to relieve it. May prove acceptable for uncritical."

Picture Show wrote: "Neatly told story of an actress who finds that her sister is infatuated with a middle-aged matinée idol, and her conclusion that her sister is responsible when the man is found murdered in the flat. The cast is really excellent."

Picturegoer wrote: "There is a good central idea to this picture ... It is, however, scrappy in its presentation and is apt to lose its grip on the interest. Miles Mander is good as a matinée idol, although the costume stage roles in which he is seen are hardly his métier. Camilla Horn also acts capably as his leading lady ... but the acting honors go to two Cockney characters who live above the flat in which the murder is committed. They are admirably rendered by Hay Petrie and Margaret Yarde. "
