= Widecombe Fair (film) =

1928 film

- Directed by: Norman Walker
- Written by: Eden Phillpotts (novel); Eliot Stannard
- Starring: William Freshman; Marguerite Allan; Wyndham Standing; Violet Hopson; Moore Marriott
- Cinematography: Claude Friese-Greene
- Edited by: Emile de Ruelle
- Production company: British International Pictures
- Distributed by: Wardour Films
- Release date: December 1928
- Running time: 6,800 feet
- Country: United Kingdom
- Language: English

Widecombe Fair is a 1928 British silent comedy drama film directed by Norman Walker and starring William Freshman, Marguerite Allan, Moore Marriott and Judd Green. The screenplay concerns a farmer who is able to save his farm when he digs up buried treasure. The film's plot was adapted from a 1913 novel by Eden Phillpotts, loosely based on the popular folk song "Widecombe Fair".

== Cast ==
- William Freshman as The Lover
- Marguerite Allan as The Daughter
- Wyndham Standing as The Squire
- Violet Hopson as The Widow
- Moore Marriott as Uncle Tom Cobleigh
- George Cooper as The Farmer
- Aubrey Fitzgerald as The Bailiff
- Eva Llewellyn as The Wife
- Judd Green as The Landlord

== Bibliography ==
- Low, Rachael. History of the British Film, 1918-1929. George Allen & Unwin, 1971.
- Wood, Linda. British Films 1927-1939. BFI, 1986.
