= Juno and the Paycock (film) =

1929 film by Alfred Hitchcock

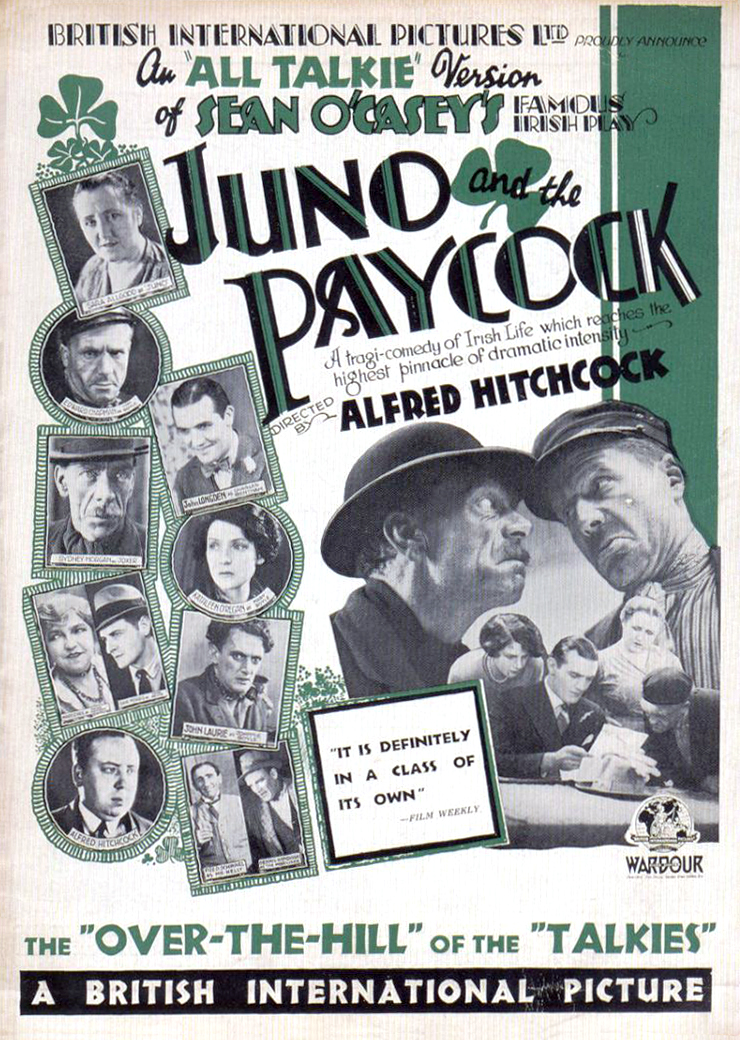
- UK pressbook
- Directed by: Alfred Hitchcock
- Screenplay by: Alfred Hitchcock; Alma Reville
- Based on: Juno and the Paycock by Seán O'Casey
- Produced by: John Maxwell
- Starring: Maire O'Neill; Edward Chapman; Sidney Morgan; Sara Allgood
- Cinematography: Jack E. Cox
- Edited by: Emile de Ruelle
- Production company: British International Pictures
- Distributed by: Wardour Films
- Release date: 29 June 1930
- Running time: 95 minutes
- Country: United Kingdom
- Languages: Sound (All-Talking); English

Juno and the Paycock (also known as The Shame of Mary Boyle) is a 1930 British all-talking sound tragicomedy film directed by Alfred Hitchcock and starring Barry Fitzgerald, Maire O'Neill, Edward Chapman and Sara Allgood. It was written by Hitchcock and Alma Reville.

The film was based on the successful 1924 play of the same name by Seán O'Casey, which has also been filmed a number of times for television.

== Plot ==
Juno and the Paycock (1930)

In the slums of Dublin during the Irish Civil War, Captain Boyle lives in a two-room tenement flat with his wife Juno and their two adult children Mary and Johnny. Juno has dubbed her husband "the Paycock" because she thinks him as useless and vain as a peacock. Juno works while the Captain loafs around the flat when not drinking up the family's meagre finances at the neighbourhood pub.

Daughter Mary has a job but is on strike against the victimisation of a co-worker. Son Johnny has become a semi-invalid after losing an arm and severely injuring his hip in a fight with the Black and Tans during the Irish War of Independence. Although Johnny has taken the Anti-Treaty side during the continuing Irish Civil War, he has recently turned in a fellow Irish Republican Army (IRA) member to the Irish Free State police who subsequently kill him. The Paycock tells his friend Joxer of his disgust at the informer, unaware that his son was responsible. The IRA suspect Johnny and order him to report to them for questioning; he refuses, protesting that his wounds show he has done his bit for Ireland.

Mary is courted by Jerry Devine, whom she leaves for Charlie Bentham who whisks her away after telling Mary's family the Captain is to receive an inheritance. The elated Captain borrows money against the (as yet un-received) inheritance and spends it freely on new furniture and a gramophone. Family friends are invited to an impromptu party at the once shabby tenement.

The Captain soon learns the inheritance has been lost because Bentham made an error in drafting the will. The Captain keeps the bad news a secret until creditors show up. Even Joxer turns on the Captain and gleefully spreads the news of the nonexistent inheritance to creditors. The furniture store repossesses the furniture. The tailor demands money for new clothes. Pub owner Mrs. Madigan takes the Victrola to cover the Captain's bar tab.

The worst is yet to come, however. Mary reveals that she has shamed the family by becoming pregnant by Charles, who has disappeared after his blunder was discovered. Her former fiancé Jerry proclaims his love for Mary and offers to marry her until he learns of her pregnancy. While his parents are absent dealing with the situation, Johnny is arrested by the IRA and his body is later found riddled with bullets. Realising that their family has been destroyed, Mary declares, "It's true. There is no God." Although completely shattered, Juno shushes her daughter, saying that they will need both Christ and the Blessed Virgin to deal with their grief. Alone, however, she laments her son's fate before the religious statues in the family's empty tenement, deciding that Boyle will remain useless, and leaves with Mary.

== Cast ==
- Maire O'Neill as Maisie Madigan
- Edward Chapman as Captain Boyle
- Sidney Morgan as "Joxer" Daly
- Sara Allgood as Mrs. Boyle / "Juno"
- John Laurie as Johnny Boyle
- Dave Morris as Jerry Devine
- Kathleen O'Regan as Mary Boyle
- John Longden as Charles Bentham
- Dennis Wyndham as The Mobiliser
- Barry Fitzgerald as The Orator

== Production ==
Hitchcock filmed a faithful reproduction of the play using few of the directorial touches he had incorporated in his previous films. Instead he often asked cinematographer Jack Cox to hold the camera for long single shots. He was eager to have a scene set outside the flat inserted into the film, and after permission from O'Casey, added a pub scene. O'Casey made quite an impression on Hitchcock, and was the inspiration for the prophet of doom in the diner in The Birds.

Sara Allgood reprised her role as Juno from the play. The tailor Mr Kelly, who repossesses Captain Boyle's new clothes (bought on hire-purchase), is portrayed by a Jewish actor and given a strong Germanic accent, although there is no indication in the original play that the character (there called Nugent) is anything other than an Irish Gentile. It has been alleged that this plays up to the stereotype of Jews as alien usurers, and 'reading' the language used by the tailor in the film – "I should vorry vot you dress yourself in? Go ahead, jump in a pillowslip!" – has obviously been reworked to sound Jewish compared to Nugent in O'Casey's play: "What do I care what you dress yourself in ? You can put yourself in a bolsther cover, if you like."

Barry Fitzgerald, who played Captain Jack Boyle in the original stage production, appears in his film debut as an orator in the first scene, but has no other role.

The original negative of the film is held in the BFI National Archive but it has never received a full restoration.

== Reception ==
The film's release met with generally enthusiastic reception from the press. The Daily Film Renter wrote: "In every respect this picture is a triumph for British production. Make no mistake about it, the film will make a powerful appeal wherever shown. Contrast, it is said, is the salt of life, and here we have it in abundance. The earlier part of the work depicts the life of an Irish family living in a slum tenement, and is crammed full of humour. Even through this, however, one senses tragedy in the background, and when it finally descends it tugs at the heart strings in no uncertain manner." Kine Weekly wrote: "This adaptation of Sean O'Casey's play is Alfred Hitchcock's finest work, and a brilliant example of British screen art. The acting is remarkable, as is the whole treatment, with its strong irony tragedy and humour."

In 1985 Jonathan Rosenbaum wrote that Hitchcock's adaptation of Juno and the Paycock, "[t]hough praised when it came out (1930), ... is a fairly deadly case of canned theater that's pretty close to what Hitchcock many years later would refer to as 'photographs of people talking.'"

== Home media ==
Licensed releases have appeared on DVD from Film First in the UK and Universal in France.
