= Spanish Eyes (film) =

1930 British musical film

- Directed by: G. B. Samuelson
- Starring: Anthony Ireland; Dennis Noble; Donald Calthrop
- Cinematography: Basil Emmott
- Production company: Twickenham Studios
- Release date: 1930
- Running time: 71 minutes
- Country: United Kingdom
- Language: English

Spanish Eyes is a 1930 British musical film directed by G. B. Samuelson and starring Anthony Ireland, Donald Calthrop and Dennis Noble. It had a gypsy theme and was made at Twickenham Studios in West London. The film was made at night, to allow other more important productions to use the studio in the daytime - a common practice at Twickenham during the era.

The film became known for the death of Nita Foy, a West End chorus girl who was working on the film, in what became known as "the Film Studio Horror". Foy was invited to Donald Calthrop's dressing room for a drink where her costume caught fire. Although the inquest exonerated him Calthrop's career never entirely recovered from the incident.

== Cast ==
- Anthony Ireland - Chechester
- Dennis Noble - Amalio
- Donald Calthrop - Mascoso
- Edna Davies - Estrella
- Antonia Brough - Landlady

== Bibliography ==
- Sweet, Matthew. Shepperton Babylon: The Lost Worlds of British Cinema. Faber and Faber, 2005.
