= The Farmer's Wife (1941 film) =

Film by Norman Lee

- Original trade ad
- Directed by: Norman Lee; Leslie Arliss
- Written by: Leslie Arliss; J.E.Hunter; Norman Lee
- Based on: The Farmer's Wife by Eden Phillpotts
- Produced by: Walter C. Mycroft
- Starring: Basil Sydney; Wilfrid Lawson; Nora Swinburne
- Cinematography: Claude Friese-Greene
- Edited by: Flora Newton
- Music by: Guy Jones
- Production company: Associated British Pictures Corporation
- Distributed by: Pathé Pictures
- Release date: 24 January 1941
- Running time: 81 minutes
- Country: United Kingdom
- Language: English

The Farmer's Wife is a 1941 British comedy drama film directed by Norman Lee and Leslie Arliss and starring Basil Sydney, Wilfrid Lawson and Nora Swinburne. It was written by Arliss, J. E. Hunter and Lee based on the 1916 play The Farmer's Wife by Eden Phillpotts which had previously been adapted by Alfred Hitchcock for a 1928 film of the same name. It was produced by ABPC at Welwyn Studios, at a time when the company's main Elstree Studios had been requisitioned for wartime use.

== Plot ==
Farmer Samuel Sweetland, a widower with two daughters, buys a large neighbouring farm that he has coveted all his life. Now convinced that he needs to remarry, he draws up a list of three possible candidates with the assistance of his housekeeper Araminta Grey. They are Louisa Windeatt, a wealthy and spirited fox-hunting widow; Thirza Tapper, a prim unmarried lady who owns a nearby cottage; and Mary Hearne, an attractive barmaid from London.

Meanwhile, Sweetland's daughters, the forceful, coquettish Petronell and the shyer Sibley, have their own romantic entanglements with the young men of the area. Petronell tips her hat at Richard Coaker, only to discover that he is in love with her younger sister, and she finds eventual comfort in the arms of another suitor, George. Sweetland's own courtships go badly as each of the women reject his offer of marriage. Dejected, it is only then that he realises it his faithful housekeeper Araminta whom he really loves.

== Cast ==
- Basil Sydney as Samuel Sweetland
- Wilfrid Lawson as Churdles Ash
- Nora Swinburne as Araminta Grey
- Patricia Roc as Sibley
- Michael Wilding as Richard Coaker
- Bunty Payne as Petronell
- Enid Stamp-Taylor as Mary Hearne
- Betty Warren as Louisa Windeatt
- Viola Lyel as Thirza Tapper
- Edward Rigby as Tom Gurney
- Kenneth Griffith as George Smerdon
- A. Bromley Davenport as Henry Coaker
- Jimmy Godden as sergeant
- Gilbert Gunn as pianist
- James Harcourt as Valiant Dunnybrigg
- Mark Daly as P. C. Chave
- Davina Craig as Susie
- Hilda Bayley as Mrs. Rundle
- David Keir as auctioneer
- Patrick Ludlow as curate
- John Salew as Mr. Rundle
- Olga Slade as minor role

== Reception ==
The Monthly Film Bulletin wrote: "For those who have seen both, the film suffers by comparison with the play, but the directors have been at pains to make the plot move as best they might, and in doing so have got some lovely exteriors of the English countryside and have made an excellent job of the local Show. Basil Sydney makes Sam Sweetland a very boorish figure, always behaving like a bull in a china shop, Wilfrid Lawson gives an impression of the cunning, poaching old farm hand, and there is one notable scene where he is dressed up as a coachman butler at a garden party. Nora Swinburne makes a pretty mouse of Araminta and Betty Warren is a breezy Widow Windeatt."

Kine Weekly wrote: "The humour in this British comedy rests securely on its neat bucolic wit and the accuracy of its female psychology. Exaggeration is, of course, evident in the characterisation, but caricature is skilfully avoided. Friendly and versatile detail – the stormy love affairs of Sam's daughters are, for instance, amiably imposed on the central theme – is yet another happy factor. Natural, spicy dialogue and authentic and pictorially effective background give the final touch to a picture that is every bit as entertaining and diverting as its successful stage progenitor."

Picturegoer wrote: "The rural humour is well captured and the feminine psychology amusingly presented."

Picture Show wrote: "Once again this delightful play has been made into an equally delightful film ... The situations, dialogue and acting all contribute to the fun, which is a real rustic frolic, with a depth of human understanding that makes the fun even better in the telling. Basil Sydney is good as the farmer, with Wilfrid Lawson a joy as the immortal Churdles Ash."

Variety wrote: "Lightweight fare, this modestly budgeted feature from Pathe is unlikely to make much stir at the boxoffice. Eden Philpotts' comedy has retained too much of its stage attire, receiving little decisive action to give it screen momentum and is held down throughout by an ultra talky script."
