= Norman Page =

English actor (1876–1935)

- Born: 1876; Nottingham, Nottinghamshire, England
- Died: 4 July 1935 (aged 58–59); London, England
- Occupation: Actor

Norman Page (1876 – 4 July 1935) was a British actor. He is best known for his portrayal of David Lloyd George, Prime Minister during the First World War, in the 1918 film The Life Story of David Lloyd George, which is believed to be the first ever feature length political biopic.

== Selected filmography ==
- The Life Story of David Lloyd George (1918)
- The Elusive Pimpernel (1919)
- Bleak House (1920)
- The Yellow Claw (1921)
- The Card (1922)
- Out to Win (1923)
- The Sign of Four (1923)
