= The City of Beautiful Nonsense (novel) =

1909 novel by E. Temple Thurston

The City of Beautiful Nonsense was a best-selling novel written by Ernest Temple Thurston. It became the inspiration for two films. It was originally published by Chapman and Hall in 1909, but because the copyright has expired, the text of the book is now in the public domain. There was a "new and illustrated" edition, with illustrations by Emile Verpilleux, published a year later in 1910. It may fairly be described as a sentimental novel: Temple Thurston himself wrote that "To many, from the first page to the last, it had not the faintest conception of reality, and indeed has earned for me the classification of sentimentalist". This was in the Author's Note to the sequel, entitled The World of Wonderful Reality, published a decade later in 1919. His obituary in The Times (20 March 1933) stated that "there were those who might suggest that sentimentalism was too evident in Temple Thurston's work".

== Films ==
The first film based on the novel was The City of Beautiful Nonsense, a silent movie released in 1919, which featured Henry Edwards, Chrissie White and Henry Vibart

The second film was a talkie, released in 1935 as City of Beautiful Nonsense. It starred Emlyn Williams, Sophie Stewart and Eve Lister. Both were filmed and produced in the United Kingdom.

In The Souvenir, Joanna Hogg's 2019 film, Honor Swinton Byrne reads to Tom Burke from the novel.
