= City of Beautiful Nonsense (1935 film) =

1935 British film by Adrian Brunel

- Daisy Dormer, Emlyn Williams and Dorothy Vernon in a scene from the film
- Directed by: Adrian Brunel
- Written by: Donovan Pedelty; E. Temple Thurston (novel)
- Produced by: Wilfred Noy
- Starring: Emlyn Williams; Sophie Stewart; Eve Lister; George Carney
- Cinematography: Desmond Dickinson
- Music by: Eric Spear
- Production company: Butcher's Film Service
- Distributed by: Butcher's Film Service
- Release date: May 1935
- Running time: 88 minutes
- Country: United Kingdom
- Language: English

City of Beautiful Nonsense is a lost 1935 British drama film directed by Adrian Brunel and starring Emlyn Williams, Sophie Stewart and Eve Lister. It was written by Donovan Pedelty based on the best-selling 1909 novel of the same name by E. Temple Thurston, which had previously been filmed as a silent by Henry Edwards in 1919.

== Preservation status ==
The British Film Institute National Archive holds a collection of ephemera and stills for The City of Beautiful Nonsense, but no film or video materials.

== Plot ==
Jill Dealtry is in love with a penniless composer Jack Grey, but believes she must marry a wealthy man to please her father. She realises after various tribulations that she should follow her heart rather than her head.

== Cast ==
- Emlyn Williams as Jack Grey
- Sophie Stewart as Jill Dealtry
- Eve Lister as Amber
- George Carney as Chesterton
- Marie Wright as Dorothy Grey
- Eric Maturin as Robert Downing
- J. Fisher White as Thomas Grey
- Daisy Dormer as Mrs. Deakin
- Hubert Harben as Mr. Dealtry
- Margaret Damer as Mrs. Dealtry
- Dorothy Vernon as Mrs. Rowse

== Reception ==
The Monthly Film Bulletin wrote: "The story, a straightforward one about ordinary likeable people, develops naturally with plenty of incident, and holds the interest. Pathos and humour are judiciously mingled, neither being overdone. The casting is excellent; the minor as well as the more important parts give ample opportunity for good acting, and full advantage is taken of this. Much of the dialogue is taken direct from the novel. There are some very good shots of Venetian scenery, and the sound of the swirling and sucking of the water as a gondola passes by is particularly effective. Music, introduced where suitable opportunity offers itself, adds considerably to the attraction of an altogether pleasing film."

The Daily Film Renter wrote: "Story seems trifle old-fashioned, but scores on angles of fragrant sentiment that were features of original. Picturesque Venetian exteriors alternate with squalid lodgings, Hyde Park, church and apartment locales. Emlyn Williams gives smooth performance in lead, George Carney registering prominently as cockney bailiff. Acceptable entertainment for the masses, with title exploitation angles."

Kine Weekly wrote: "Simple romantic drama, a happy, appealing piece of make-believe, straightforwardly adapted from E. Temple Thurston's popular novel, and set in a harmonious atmosphere. The treatment is at times heavy-handed; but imagination is to be found in the generous spirit of the theme. It looks on life kindly, and finds its sympathetic, charming entertainment in the accuracy with which it is interpreted by the principal players. Very good booking for the masses and family halls, with indisputable title values."

Picturegoer wrote: "In a simple manner the way of true love is smoothed out with a nicely balanced sentimentality and a certain artless charm. The acting too is natural. Emlyn Williams makes the most of the role of Jack Grey and graces it with conviction while Sophie Stewart – of whom we should see a good deal more – is most appealing as Jill. Eric Maturin is good as the fiancé while light relief is admirably supplied by George Carney as a kind-hearted bailiff."
