= The Farmer's Wife =

1928 film by Alfred Hitchcock

- Directed by: Alfred Hitchcock
- Screenplay by: Eliot Stannard; Leslie Arliss (uncredited)
- Based on: The Farmer's Wife play by Eden Phillpotts; Adelaide Phillpotts
- Produced by: John Maxwell (uncredited)
- Starring: Jameson Thomas; Lillian Hall-Davis; Gordon Harker
- Cinematography: Jack E. Cox
- Edited by: Alfred Booth
- Production company: British International Pictures
- Distributed by: Wardour Films
- Release date: 2 March 1928
- Running time: 107 minutes (2012 restoration)
- Country: United Kingdom
- Language: Silent film with English intertitles

The Farmer's Wife is a 1928 British silent romantic comedy film directed by Alfred Hitchcock and starring Jameson Thomas, Lillian Hall-Davis and Gordon Harker.

It is adapted from a 1916 play of the same name by British novelist, poet and playwright Eden Phillpotts, best known for a series of novels based on Dartmoor, in Devon. The Farmer's Wife is produced by British International Pictures at Elstree studios. The film's sets were designed by the art director Wilfred Arnold. The film was remade as a 1941 film The Farmer's Wife directed by Leslie Arliss.

== Plot ==
The Farmer's Wife (1928)

Tibby, the wife of Samuel Sweetland dies, and shortly afterwards his daughter marries and leaves home, leaving him on his own with his two servants. His wife had told him that he should remarry after her death, so he pursues some local spinsters who were at his daughter's wedding after he and his housekeeper Minta make out a list of possibilities.

First is Widow Louisa Windeatt, but Sweetland is shocked and angry when she rejects his advances and says she is too independent for him. Next, he attempts to court Thirza Tapper, a nervous wreck who almost collapses when Sweetland proposes to her. She, too, rejects him because she says she has no need for a man, and he is furious yet again. He wanders outside as other guests arrive for her party. His grumpy servant Ash is helping at the party, wearing an ill-fitting coat and trying to keep his trousers up while doing his work at the party.

While the others are outside listening to some singers, Sweetland proposes to Mary Hearn, but she rejects him as too old, and then becomes hysterical when he angrily tells her that she too is "full blown and a bit over."

Later Sweetland tells Minta that he is not going to finish the list of women because he is so dejected. He leaves the room and Ash returns and tells Minta what an embarrassment to men that Sweetland is by going around and practically begging any woman to be his wife. Sweetland overhears this and orders Ash to saddle his horse because he is going to try number four on the list, Mercy Bassett, a barmaid at a local inn. After he leaves, it is revealed that Minta is in love with him. Bassett rejects him too and he comes home dejectedly. Meanwhile, postmistress Hearn and Tapper compare notes and Hearn decides she should marry him after all and she goes to his house with Tapper.

Having run through the women who have turned him down, Samuel sees Minta for the first time as more than a housekeeper and decides that she is the woman for him, if she'll have him. He tells her he has got used to being rejected and will not be angry if she rejects him, too. She accepts him and he tells her to put on the dress Tibby gave her. As she goes to the room, Hearn and Tapper arrive. Hearn says she is now willing to be his wife. Samuel says all should drink a toast to his wife to be and Hearn is sure it is her, until Minta comes down the stairs in an attractive dress. Hearn lapses into hysterics again as Sweetland reveals that Minta will be his bride.

== Cast ==
- Jameson Thomas as Samuel Sweetland
- Lillian Hall-Davis as Araminta Dench, his Housekeeper
- Gordon Harker as Churdles Ash: his Handyman
- Gibb McLaughlin as Henry Coaker
- Maud Gill as Thirza Tapper
- Louie Pounds as Widow Louisa Windeatt
- Olga Slade as Mary Hearn: Postmistress
- Ruth Maitland as Mercy Bassett
- Antonia Brough as Susan
- Haward Watts as Dick Coaker
- Diana Napier (credited as Mollie Ellis) as Sibley Sweetland

== Production ==
The supporting cast includes Gordon Harker, in a comic role as a surly servant named Churdles Ash; Gibb McLaughlin as Henry Coaker; and Maud Gill as Thirza Tapper. As well as many indoor locations, there are a few outdoor scenes, such as Samuel getting about on a horse in open country as well as a large fox hunt starting off from the local inn.

== Preservation status and home media ==
A restoration of The Farmer's Wife was completed in 2012 as part of the BFI's £2 million "Save the Hitchcock 9" project to restore all of the director's surviving silent films.

Restored releases have appeared on DVD, Blu-ray and video on demand from Optimum in the UK, Lionsgate and Kino Lorber in the US, and many others.
