= Adrian Brunel =

British film director (1892–1958)

- Born: 4 September 1892; Brighton, Sussex, England
- Died: 18 February 1958 (aged 65); Gerrards Cross, Buckinghamshire, England
- Occupations: Film director, screenwriter
- Years active: 1917–1940

Adrian Brunel (4 September 1892 – 18 February 1958) was an English film director and screenwriter. Brunel's directorial career started in the silent era, and reached its peak in the latter half of the 1920s. His surviving work from the 1920s, both full-length feature films and shorts, is highly regarded by silent film historians for its distinctive innovation, sophistication and wit.

With the arrival of talkies, Brunel's career ground to a halt and he was absent from the screen for several years before returning in the mid-1930s with a flurry of quota quickie productions, most of which are now considered lost. One that survives, perhaps his most familiar credit to today's film buffs, is the 1935 Buster Keaton comedy The Invader. It was distributed by MGM in England, and released in the United States by film importer J. H. Hoffberg as An Old Spanish Custom.

Adrian Brunel's last credit as director was in a 1940 comedy film, although he worked for a few years more as a "fixer-up" for films directed or produced by friends in the industry.

After decades of neglect, Brunel's work has latterly been rediscovered and has undergone a critical re-evaluation. His lost films are eagerly sought, and the British Film Institute includes two, The Crooked Billet (1929) and Badger's Green (1934), on its "75 Most Wanted" list of missing British feature films.

== Early life and career ==
Born in Brighton in 1892, Brunel was educated at Harrow School. His mother Adey was a drama teacher so he grew up in a stage milieu and dabbled in acting and writing plays, as well as training in opera. On leaving school, he worked for a time as a local journalist in Brighton before taking employment in London in the bioscope show distribution division of music hall chain Moss Empires. This spurred his interest in cinema, and in 1916 he and a friend formed a company called Mirror Films, which produced one film, The Cost of a Kiss, the following year.

In 1920, Brunel joined with actor Leslie Howard and author A. A. Milne to set up Minerva Films, which produced six comedy shorts over a two-year period. Brunel's major break came in 1923, when he was offered the directorial role for the film The Man Without Desire, starring Ivor Novello. His feature film debut was a time-travelling story set in Venice and included location filming in the Italian city. Studio and post-production work took place in Germany, and the resulting work has been described as "one of the stranger films to emerge from Britain in the 1920s".

== Comedy shorts ==
Between 1923 and 1925, Brunel directed a series of sophisticated comedy burlesque short films, frequently lampooning fads or institutions of the day. Initially, these were produced and distributed independently, but their popularity among film insiders and cognoscenti brought them to the attention of Michael Balcon, who offered Brunel the opportunity to produce them through Gainsborough Pictures. These films were replete with punning intertitles and playful visual wit, with a number parodying the silhouette animation technique pioneered by Lotte Reiniger by using live actors in place of animated cutouts (Two-Chinned Chow, Shimmy Sheik, and Yes, We Have No...! – in which a man is driven to distraction by the ubiquity of the song "Yes! We Have No Bananas" and travels to ever-more exotic and outlandish locations to escape it, only to find that no matter where in the world he goes, the song has got there first).

Other films were self-referential in highlighting the ability of film to produce a manipulated and distorted picture of reality. Brunel's most highly admired production of this period is 1924's Crossing the Great Sagrada, a spoof of the hugely popular travelogue genre of the time, in which its conventions are laid bare as the absurdities they are. Brunel uses the film to satirise the prevalent colonial view of "native people", while highlighting the dishonesty inherent in the genre with ludicrously incongruous intertitles, tagging a view of an African mud-hut village as Wapping, and a sequence of the heroes struggling across a desert landscape as Blackpool beach. Critic Jamie Sexton noted: "The film's surreal humour prefigures that of later innovative British comedy, such as Monty Python's Flying Circus.

Brunel also targeted the British film industry itself, with So This Is Jollygood, bemoaning what he saw as its general ineptitude in comparison with its American counterpart, and Cut It Out, attacking the over-zealousness of the British film censors.

== Gainsborough films ==
Impressed with Brunel's short film output, Balcon invited him to try his hand at directing full-length features for Gainsborough. This resulted in five films between 1926 and 1929, all of which were high profile, big-budget productions with star names, and were designed as serious prestige vehicles with none of the opportunities for the humour and facetiousness of most of Brunel's earlier work. The first release was Blighty, a class-based study of life during World War I, written by Brunel's friend Ivor Montagu. It was reported that Brunel was initially uneasy about directing a "war film", as it went against his moral values; however, the finished product contained no militaristic or jingoistic material, concentrating instead on the effects of the unseen war on an English family.

In 1928, there followed two films which reunited Brunel with Novello as his leading actor: the first screen adaptation of Margaret Kennedy's best-selling novel The Constant Nymph and a version of the Noël Coward play The Vortex. Brunel's third film of 1928 was A Light Woman starring Benita Hume, while 1929 brought the Madeleine Carroll vehicle The Crooked Billet, which Brunel described in his autobiography as "my last, and perhaps my best, silent film". The film's "lost" status however precludes it from being critically evaluated alongside his surviving work.

== Later career ==
With the introduction of talkies to British cinema, Brunel's career impetus came to a sudden halt. It is not exactly clear why Brunel in particular should have found his career so comprehensively derailed at this time, although it is suggested that his pursuance of a legal claim against Gainsborough for alleged non-payment of fees may well have tarnished his reputation in the film industry by making him appear a potential trouble-maker. After writing and partly directing 1930's Elstree Calling for British International Pictures, he was sacked by the studio, who enlisted Alfred Hitchcock to finish the picture, and no further film offers were forthcoming.

Brunel returned to film directing in 1933, and over the following four years made 17 quota quickies, mainly for Fox British. As was the norm with quota quickie directors, Brunel's films in this period encompassed a range of genres from comedy and musicals, through drama, to thrillers and crime. However, few of these films are known to survive. Brunel's last three feature films, The Rebel Son (1938); The Lion Has Wings (1939), a three-way directorial venture with Michael Powell and Brian Desmond Hurst; and The Girl Who Forgot (1940), were more visible productions which do survive.

Following these, Brunel drew a line under his directorial career, although he did continue for a time to offer uncredited help as a favour, most notably to his old friend Leslie Howard on The First of the Few (1942) and The Gentle Sex (1943). He published an autobiography Nice Work in 1949, and died in February 1958, aged 65.

In an assessment of Brunel's significance in British cinema history, Geoff Brown concludes: "...(his) career was clearly not what it might have been, and the apparent absence of surviving copies of many of his talkies makes a thorough re-evaluation of his work difficult. But the burlesque comedies alone give him a distinctive place in British cinema history as a satirical jester, and a key player in the film industry's uneasy war between art and commerce."

Michael Balcon called him "a man of great worth who never reached any of the peaks but nevertheless had made a great contribution in his early days with his engaging one-reel satirical comedies and his feature films, The Man Without Desire and The Constant Nymph."

== Filmography (director) ==
=== Feature films ===
- 1917: The Cost of a Kiss
- 1923: The Man Without Desire
- 1924: Lovers in Araby
- 1927: Blighty
- 1928: The Constant Nymph
- 1928: A Light Woman
- 1928: The Vortex
- 1929: The Crooked Billet
- 1930: Elstree Calling
- 1933: Two Wives for Henry
- 1933: The Laughter of Fools
- 1933: Little Napoleon
- 1933: I'm an Explosive
- 1933: Follow the Lady
- 1933: Taxi to Paradise
- 1934: Important People
- 1934: Badger's Green
- 1934: Menace
- 1934: Variety
- 1935: Vanity
- 1935: The Invader
- 1935: City of Beautiful Nonsense
- 1935: Cross Currents
- 1935: While Parents Sleep
- 1936: Prison Breaker
- 1936: Love at Sea
- 1938: The Rebel Son
- 1939: The Lion Has Wings
- 1940: The Girl Who Forgot

=== Short films ===
- 1920: Twice Two
- 1920: The Bump
- 1920: Five Pounds Reward
- 1920: Bookworms
- 1921: Too Many Cooks
- 1921: The Temporary Lady
- 1923: Yes, We Have No...!
- 1923: Two-Chinned Chow
- 1923: The Shimmy Sheik
- 1924: The Pathetic Gazette
- 1924: Sheer Trickery
- 1924: Crossing the Great Sagrada
- 1925: The Blunderland of Big Game
- 1925: So This Is Jollygood
- 1925: Cut It Out
- 1925: Battling Bruisers
- 1925: A Typical Budget
- 1940: Salvage with a Smile

== Bibliography ==
Brunel wrote two guides to filmmaking and a memoir detailing his time in the industry.

- Filmcraft: the Art of Picture Production (1935)
- Film script: The Technique of Writing for the Screen (1948)
- Nice Work: Thirty Years in British Films (1949)
