= Norman Walker (director) =

English film director (1892–1963)

- Born: 8 October 1892; Bolton, Lancashire, England
- Died: 4 November 1963 (aged 71); England
- Occupation: Film director
- Years active: 1926–1958

Norman Walker (8 October 1892 – 4 November 1963) was an English film director. In the 1940s he set up his own company G.H.W. Productions, backed by the Rank Organisation, and released four films.

== Filmography ==
- Tommy Atkins (1928)
- Widecombe Fair (1928)
- The Hate Ship (1929)
- A Romance of Seville (1929)
- Loose Ends (1930)
- The Middle Watch (1930)
- Uneasy Virtue (1931)
- The Shadow Between (1931)
- Fires of Fate (1932)
- Mr. Bill the Conqueror (1932)
- Forging Ahead (1933)
- The House of Trent (1933)
- The Fortunate Fool (1933)
- The Flaw (1933)
- The Way of Youth (1934)
- Dangerous Ground (1934)
- Lilies of the Field (1934)
- Turn of the Tide (1935)
- Key to Harmony (1935)
- Debt of Honour (1936)
- Sunset in Vienna (1937)
- Our Fighting Navy (1937)
- The Man at the Gate (1941)
- The Great Mr. Handel (1942)
- Hard Steel (1942)
- They Knew Mr. Knight (1946)
- John Wesley (1954)
