= The Little Damozel =

The Little Damozel may refer to:

- The Little Damozel (play), a play by Monckton Hoffe
- The Little Damozel (1916 film), a silent British film directed by Wilfred Noy
- The Little Damozel (1933 film), a film directed by Herbert Wilcox
