= The Faithful Heart =

The Faithful Heart may refer to:

- The Faithful Heart (play), a 1921 play by Monckton Hoffe
- The Faithful Heart (radio serial), a 1948 Australian radio serial by Edmund Barclay
- The Faithful Heart (1922 film), a British film
- Cœur fidèle, a 1923 French film with the English title The Faithful Heart
- The Faithful Heart (1932 film), a British film
