= Molly Kerr =

- Kerr in 1928
- Born: Frances Keen; 28 May 1904; Kensington, London
- Died: 31 May 1942 (aged 38); Hove, Sussex
- Occupation(s): Actress and producer

Molly Kerr (28 May 1904 – 31 May 1942) was an actress and theatre producer who originated the role of Bunty Mainwaring in Noël Coward's play The Vortex.

Born into a family of actors, Kerr made her London stage debut in 1921. She gained wider notice in The Faithful Heart later that year. This was followed by appearances in The Second Mrs Tanqueray, a spell touring with the theatre troupe of Mrs Patrick Campbell, and another West End role in The Return of Sherlock Holmes, all in 1922. The Vortex had a good run in London (1924–1925) and another in New York (1925–1926). Further plays followed in London and New York over the next two years.

In 1927, Kerr became, according to The Westminster Gazette, the youngest female producer of stage plays in history when she produced The Intriguing Ladies at the Q Theatre and then produced at the Arts Theatre. Her last London stage performance, in 1928 was in Two White Arms. She continued producing into 1929. In 1931 she moved to Balcombe, Sussex, with her parents, where she appeared in entertainments presented by the local Women’s Institute.

== Early life ==
Kerr was born Frances Keen on 28 May 1904 in Kensington, London, to Frederick Grinham Keen (1858–1933), an actor who used the stage name Frederick Kerr, and Lucy Houghton Keen, née Dowson (1862–1941). She was baptised Frances Mary Keen at the church of St Mary Abbots in Kensington. Her elder brother was the actor, author and playwright Geoffrey Kemble Grinham Keen (1895–1971), who used the stage name Geoffrey Kerr, and her older sister was Lucy Joyce Gunning Keen (1897–1980), who acted under the stage name Joyce Kerr before marrying, in 1924, James Boswell Talbot, 3rd Baron Talbot de Malahide (1874–1948).

Kerr was educated at St Paul's and Granville House School for Girls in Eastbourne. In about 1920 at the age of 16 she enrolled in the drama school run by Lady Constance Benson at Pembroke Gardens, Kensington.

== Career ==
Kerr made her stage debut aged 17 in 1921 in Threads by Frank Stayton playing Chloe, the daughter of a judge. The play ran for 30 performances from 23 August 1921 at the St James's Theatre in London. She gained wider notice in her next role, as society girl Diana Oughterson, in The Faithful Heart by Monckton Hoffe, which opened at the Comedy Theatre in November 1921 and ran for 185 performances. This was followed by appearances in The Second Mrs Tanqueray by Arthur Pinero at the Playhouse Theatre in 1922; a spell touring with the theatre troupe of Mrs Patrick Campbell, as her father had done, and playing Lady Frances Carfax in The Return of Sherlock Holmes by J. E. Harold Terry at the Princes Theatre. In 1922 Kerr appeared in her only film, a four-reel silent comedy called Hide and Seek produced by Martin Walker.

In 1924 Kerr played the part of Bunty Mainwaring opposite Noël Coward in the original production of his play The Vortex at the Everyman Theatre, Hampstead. The play ran for 244 performances at three more London theatres between November 1924 and June 1925. In September 1925 The Vortex transferred to the US and after a try-out week in Washington, D.C. it played for 157 performances at Henry Miller’s Theater in New York, where Coward, Lilian Braithwaite and Kerr repeated their roles until it closed in January 1926. During her stay in New York, Kerr modelled French fashions for American Vogue. On her return to England Kerr played the part of Brenda Fallon in Loose Ends by Dion Titheradge, a play that also transferred to the US and opened at the Ritz Theatre in New York in November 1926. Also in 1926, Kerr appeared in Escape by John Galsworthy as the Shingled Lady.

In 1927, aged 23, Kerr became, according to The Westminster Gazette, the youngest female producer of stage plays in history when she produced The Intriguing Ladies with the play’s author, Frank Stayton, at the Q Theatre. Kerr then produced at the Arts Theatre the first play written by the novelist Audrey Lucas, called The Peaceful Thief. She also acted in both plays. The theatre critic and impresario J. T. Grein wrote of her performance: "Personally, I think that she is destined to be an emotional actress of much power".

From January 1928 Kerr appeared in 149 performances of Two White Arms a farce by Harold Dearden at the Ambassadors Theatre, playing the wife, Alison Liston, and then played Margaret Orme in Loyalties by Galsworthy in both Paris and London.

In April 1929 Kerr took a short lease on the Everyman Theatre in Hampstead where she produced and directed one of four plays that she had written, called Requital, which had 15 performances starring Moyna MacGill and Peggy Ashcroft.

== Last years and death ==
In 1931 Kerr moved to Balcombe, Sussex, with her parents. There she appeared in entertainments presented by the local Women’s Institute, published a small book of poems and bred caged birds.

Kerr died of a brain tumour in a nursing home in Hove on 31 May 1942, three days after her 38th birthday. She was buried in the graveyard of St Mary’s Church, Balcombe, in the plot next to her mother, who had died the previous year.
