= Marda Vanne =

South African actress (1896–1970)

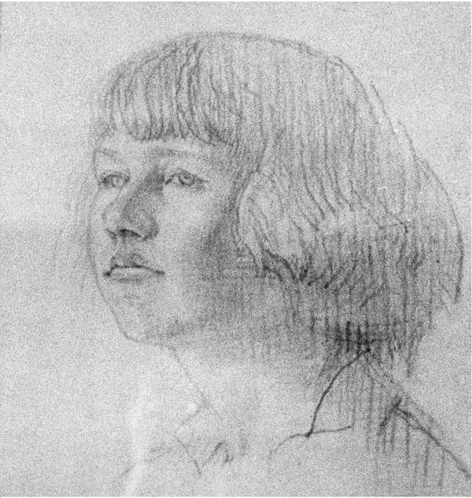
- Born: Margaretha van Hulsteyn; 27 September 1896; Pretoria, South African Republic
- Died: 27 April 1970 (aged 73); London, England
- Occupation: Actress
- Spouse: J.G. Strijdom (divorced)

Marda Vanne (born Margaretha van Hulsteyn; (Note: One source, a close friend, spells her name "Margueretha".) 27 September 1896 – 27 April 1970) was a South African actress who found fame in London.

== Early life ==
Margaretha was born in Pretoria, South African Republic to Sir Willem and Lady van Hulsteyn. Sir Willem was born in The Netherlands in 1865 and emigrated to South Africa at the age of fifteen. Sir Willem became a leading lawyer in Johannesburg and later a member of the South African Parliament for many years. During the South African War, he became an advisor to Lord Milner, the Governor of the Cape Colony, and was knighted by King Edward VII in 1902.

In her childhood, she had the nickname Scrappy. She performed as Scrappy van Hulsteyn in her early stage career in South Africa, before heading to London.

Margaretha was briefly married to politician Johannes Gerhardus "Hans" Strijdom in 1924, but the couple divorced within the year. Strijdom later went on to serve as Prime Minister of South Africa from 1954–1958.

In 1914, Vanne met Isaac Rosenberg in Cape Town, who was on a visit to South Africa. He took a shine to her and drew a charcoal sketch of her. He also gave her a copy of his poem "If You Are Fire, and I Am Fire" and wrote a number of passionate love-poems at the time, which seem to have been inspired by her.

== London ==
Margaretha took Marda Vanne as a stage name in 1918 when she headed to London. Vanne moved to London to build on her acting career and studied speech training and drama under Elsie Fogerty at the Central School of Speech and Drama, then based at the Royal Albert Hall, London. After graduating she met director Basil Dean who recognised her talent and she had a successful career in the West End. She also performed on Broadway in Noël Coward's Easy Virtue (1925), directed by Dean, and Many Waters (1929) by Monckton Hoffe.

Vanne became a good friend of Alec Waugh, the brother of Evelyn Waugh. Alec noted in one of his books that Marda tended to be cast in supporting roles. He suggested that it was because she "lacked sex appeal on stage. ... She lacked lightness. She did not look embraceable. I pictured her in more emotional roles, as a mature woman." He wrote that although she had several affairs with men, her main interest was women. John Gielgud became a good friend of Vanne and mentions her in his writings.

== South African company ==
In London, Vanne formed a professional and personal partnership with the actress Dame Gwen Ffrangcon-Davies that lasted until her death in 1970. The couple founded a theatre company in South Africa, at the outbreak of World War II, when most of the London theatres were dark. They toured the provinces, including appearances at the Hoffmeyer Theatre in Cape Town. There they performed their production of Twelfth Night in which Marda played Maria and Gwen played Olivia. They also produced and acted in the play Quality Street by James Barrie. They played 44 towns in fifteen weeks and made a small profit. Vanne appeared as Madame Arcati in a production of Blithe Spirit in Johannesburg, and she and Ffrangcon-Davies brought their production of The Merry Wives of Windsor to the Alhambra Theatre in Cape Town in 1945.

In 1950, Vanne directed an Afrikaans translation of Grumpy, by Horace Hodges and T. Wigney Percyval called Oupa Brompie for the National Theatre Organisation (NTO) of South Africa.

They produced The Dam by South African writer Guy Butler in 1952, which the author criticised for portraying the Coloured (mixed-race) characters as caricatures.

== Death ==
Vanne gained British Citizenship in 1965. She died of cancer in 1970 in London.

== Selected work ==
=== Theatre ===
- If (1921) by Lord Dunsany – Mary Beal
- King Lear's Wife (1921) by Gordon Bottomley – Hygd
- Amphitryon; or, The Two Socia's (1922) by John Dryden – Phaedra
- Loyalties (1922) by John Galsworthy – Margaret Orme
- The Maid's Tragedy (1925) by Francis Beaumont and John Fletcher – Dula
- Rain (1925) by John Colton and Clemence Randolph (based on W. Somerset Maugham's story "Miss Thompson") – Mrs. Davidson
- Easy Virtue (1926) by Noël Coward – Marion
- Made in Heaven (1926) by Phyllis Morris – Jane Chute
- The Marriage of Figaro (1926) by Barry V. Jackson (after Beaumarchais) – Suzanne
- The Widowing of Mrs Holroyd (1926) – Mrs Holroyd (Note: "Miss Marda Vanne, as Mrs. Holroyd, made the transition from passivity to passion, from wife to lover, with a complete mastery of the quietest method. This was muted acting at its best ...she possesses a comparatively rare gift. Whenever she is motionless her attitudes are significant; when she is still and silent her body continues to act, and she spoke with a peremptory impulsiveness admirably suited to the part." – Desmond MacCarthy (18 Dec. 1926) The New Statesman) (Note: "...gave a beautifuuly balanced and emotional performance as the play's tormented heroine." – H.H. (24 Dec. 1926) The Outlook p. 629)
- The Constant Wife (1927) by W. Somerset Maugham (Note: "Miss Marda Vanne is an actress of extreme flexibility. She changes style, looks, and mood for every part she plays, and again she was brilliantly not herself." – Ivor Brown (April 1927) Saturday Review)
- The Desperate Lovers (1927) by Alfred Sutro – Lady Eulalie Havers
- The Happy Husband (1927) by Harrison Owen – Stella Tolhurst
- Home Chat (1927) by Noël Coward – Mavis Wittersham
- Many Waters (1928) by Monckton Hoffe – Mabel Wingrove, Mabel Barcaldine
- Two White Arms (1928) by Harold Dearden – Lydia Charrington
- Cape Forlorn (1930)
- For Services Rendered (1932) by W. Somerset Maugham – Gwen Cedar (Note: "...and especially Marda Vanne in the awkward part of Mrs Cedar are others whom one would like to praise at length." – Peter Fleming (November 1932) Spectator)
- Pleasure Cruise (1932) by Austen Allen – Judy Mills
- At 8 a.m. (1935) by Jan Fabricius
- Parnell (1936) by Elsie T. Schauffler – Mrs Benjamin Wood (Note: "...and from the power of [the performance] of Miss Marda Vanne as Mrs. O'Shea's shewd old aunt. ...and, particularly, Miss Marda Vanne in the dry precision of her wit...." – Charles Morgan (24 April 1936) The Times)
- The King of Nowhere (1937) by James Bridie
- Lovers' Meeting (1937) by Leonard Ide
- The Provoked Wife (1937) – Lady Fanciful
- The Flashing Stream (1938) by Charles Morgan – Lady Helston
- Madmoiselle (1941) (in Afrikaans) with Siegfried Mynhardt
- Six Characters in Search of an Author (1954) by Luigi Pirandello
- Morning's at Seven (1956)
- Man and Superman (1965)

=== Filmography ===
- Strange Boarders (1938) – Mrs. Greatorex
- Joanna (1968)

=== Television ===
- The Great Adventure (1939)
- Passion, Poison and Petrifaction (1939)
- Prelude to Glory (1954)
- Vanity Fair (1956–57)
- BBC Sunday-Night Theatre (1957)
- Peace and Quiet (1957)
- Our Mutual Friend (1958)
- Dark Possession (1959)
- The Eustace Diamonds (1959)
- Knight Errant Limited (1960)
- Somerset Maugham Hour (1960)
- The First Gentleman (1961)
- Emergency-Ward 10 (1964)
- Theatre 625 (1965)
- Out of the Unknown (1965)
- Broome Stages (1966)
- Middlemarch (1968)
- BBC Play of the Month (1970)

=== Radio ===
- The Words Upon the Window Pane (1937) by William Butler Yeats

== Personal life ==
Although she married a man early in life and had other relationships with men, her longest relationship was with a woman. Vanne was the partner for many decades of British actress Dame Gwen Ffrangcon-Davies.
