= Many Waters (film) =

1931 film

- Directed by: Milton Rosmer
- Written by: Leon M. Lion
- Based on: Many Waters by Monckton Hoffe
- Produced by: J.A. Thorpe
- Starring: Lillian Hall-Davis; Arthur Margetson; Elizabeth Allan; Donald Calthrop
- Cinematography: Henry W. Gerrard; Hal Young
- Edited by: Bert Bates
- Music by: John Reynders
- Production company: Associated Metropolitan
- Distributed by: Pathé Pictures International
- Release date: 3 November 1931
- Running time: 75 minutes
- Country: United Kingdom
- Language: English

Many Waters is a 1931 British romance film directed by Milton Rosmer and starring Lillian Hall-Davis, Arthur Margetson and Elizabeth Allan. It was written by Leon M. Lion based on the 1928 play of the same title by Monckton Hoffe.

The film marked the first talkie for actress Lillian Hall-Davis, a star of the silent era, as well as being her last film prior to her suicide in 1933.

== Plot ==
After falling in love at first sight following a chance encounter, an elderly couple reminisce about the romantic adventures of their youth.

== Cast ==
- Lillian Hall-Davis as Mabel Barcaldine
- Arthur Margetson as Jim Barcaldine
- Elizabeth Allan as Freda Barcaldine
- Donald Calthrop as Compton Hardcastle
- Sam Livesey as Stanley Rosel
- Mary Clare as Mrs. Rosel
- Robert Douglas as Godfrey Marvin
- Charles Carson as Henry Delauney
- Ivan Samson as Philip Sales
- Renée Macready as Dolly Sales
- Herbert Lomas as Everett
- Hay Petrie as director
- J. Fisher White as gentleman
- Monckton Hoffe as Registrar
- S.A. Cookson as Registrar of Marriage
- Paul Gill as Doctor Sangster
- Clare Greet as Registry Office cleaner
- Philip Hewland as Registry Office clerk
- David Miller as Mr. Clinchpole
- Cicely Oates as Registry Office cleaner
- Bill Shine as Registry Office junior clerk

== Production ==
The film was shot at the Elstree Studios of British International Pictures.

== Critical reception ==
Film Weekly wrote: "The director has paid so much atteation to detail that his development of the main theme is slowed up almost to the point of boredom. And the sentiment occasionally tends to become a little overpowering. On the other hand, his portrait of a middle-class family, their surroundings, their friends, and their enemies, is painstaking in its realism, owing to the very fine work of the excellent cast."

Kine Weekly wrote: "A quiet, slow-moving drama of suburbia, which carries emotional and feminine appeal, if it hardly reaches great heights. The moral of the story is, nowever, driven home. ... Arthur Margetson is quite good as Mr. Barcaldine, and helps to give a little strength to the drama, but Lillian Hall Davis strikes the sentimental note too heavily as the wife. ... There is a good idea behind this play, but full advantage has not been taken of its possibilities. For one thing, the producer is too intent on detail, and, as a result, much that could have been left to the imagination holds up the action and obscures the main issue."

Picturegoer wrote: "Lilian Hall Davis makes her talkie debut as the wife. She is rather too heavily sentimental in her rendering of it, but Arthur Margetson is good as the husband and the strong cast give effective support."

The Daily Mirror wrote: "Many Waters, a splendidly-produced talkie adaptation of Monckton Hoffe's human drama, is notable for a first-class performance by Miss Elizabeth Allan. ... [The film] has been skilfully produced and is extremely well acted. Lilian Hall-Davis and Arthur Margetson give moving performances as the married couple who stick together through adversity, and they are well backed up by a competent cast."
