= Argentine Love =

1924 film by Allan Dwan

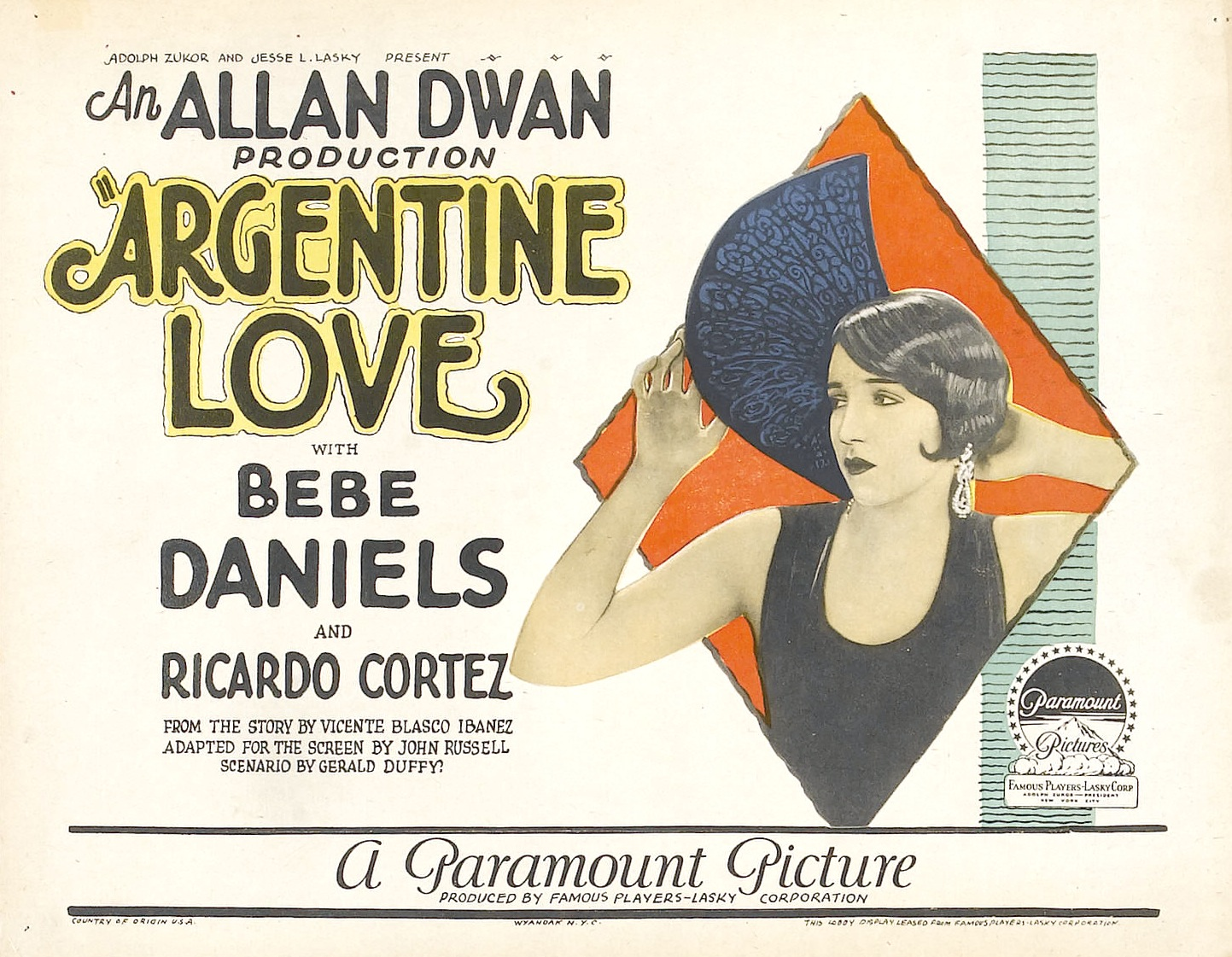
- Lobby card
- Directed by: Allan Dwan
- Written by: John Russell (adaptation); Gerald Duffy (scenario)
- Story by: Vicente Blasco Ibáñez
- Produced by: Adolph Zukor; Jesse Lasky
- Starring: Bebe Daniels
- Cinematography: J. Roy Hunt
- Distributed by: Paramount Pictures
- Release date: December 29, 1924
- Running time: 60 minutes
- Country: United States
- Language: Silent (English intertitles)

Argentine Love is a 1924 American silent romantic drama film directed by Allan Dwan and based on a short story by Vicente Blasco Ibáñez that stars Bebe Daniels.

In the film, the legal guardians of an Argentine woman arrange her marriage to a man of their choice, but are unaware that she already has a boyfriend. Her betrothed is determined to kill any rival suitors, and murders a senator's son for merely flirting with his fiancee.

== Plot ==
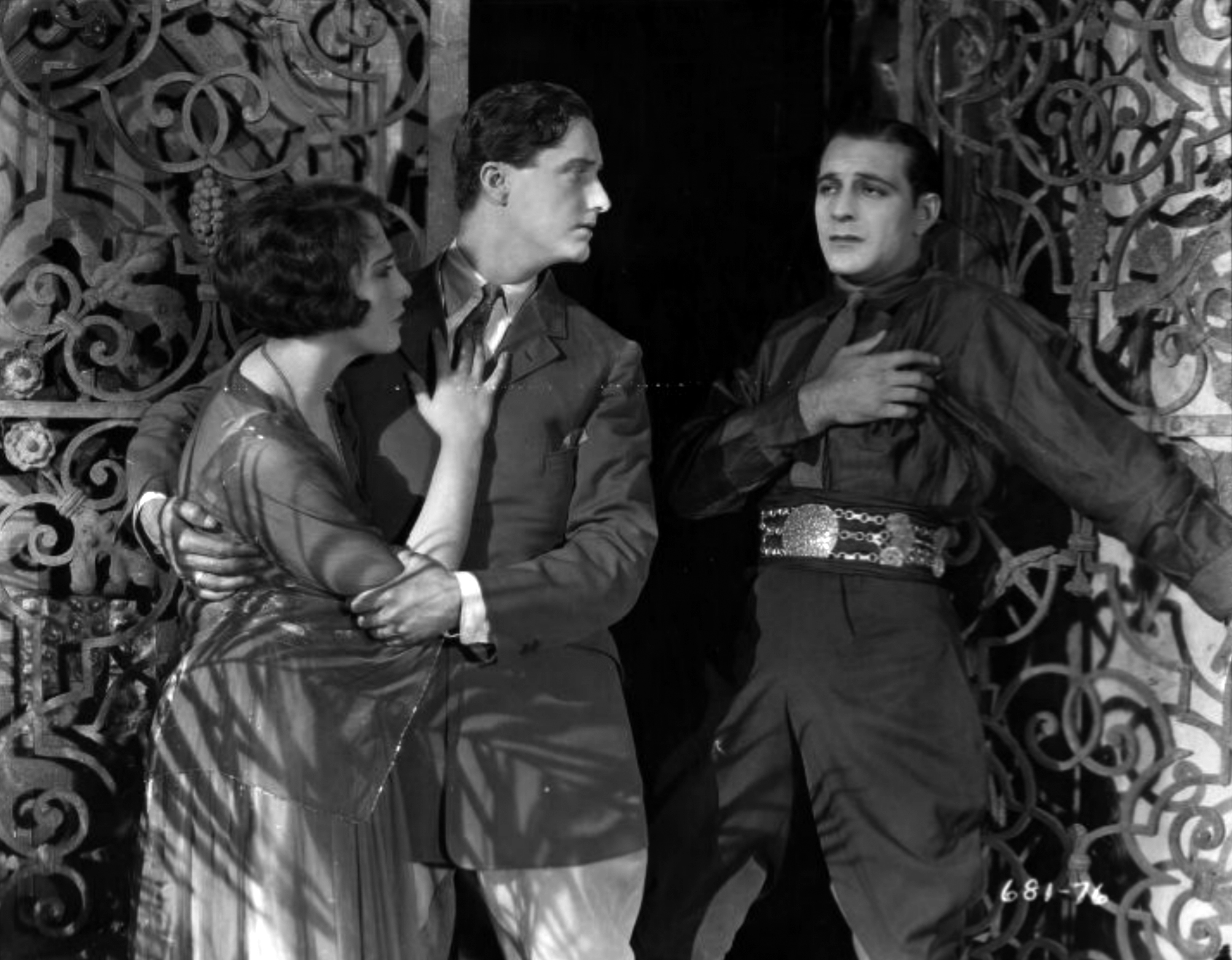
L—R: Bebe Daniels, James Rennie, and Ricardo Cortez

As described in a review in a film magazine, during a two-year absence in the United States, the guardians of Consuelo Garcia arrange her marriage to Juan Martin, who lives in the same hometown in Argentina. However, she is in love with the American Philip Sears, who is coming to her country to build a bridge, so she turns Juan down. Juan is furious and vows to kill anyone who comes between them, and does kill Rafael, the son of Senator Cornejo, after he sees him flirting with Consuelo. Juan sends a warning to Philip, who comes immediately. In the meantime, the populace vent their spite on Consuelo, beating her while she is tied to the end of a cart. Philip rescues her. To save his life, she pretends love for Juan, and Philip puts on Juan's cloak and hat to aid their escape. Consuelo tells Juan that she will marry him, but that she does not love him. Juan returns to the house and, saying that an Argentine is not to be outdone in gallantry by an American, gives himself up to the crowd and is shot by the murdered young man's father. Philip and Consuelo then find their path to happiness unobstructed.

== Cast ==
- Bebe Daniels as Consuelo Garcia
- Ricardo Cortez as Juan Martin
- James Rennie as Philip Sears
- Mario Majeroni as Senator Cornejo
- Russ Whytal as Emanuel Garcia
- Alice Chapin as Madame Garcia
- Julia Hurley as La Mosca
- Mark Gonzales as Rafael Cornejo
- Aurelio Coccia as Pedro

== Preservation ==
With no prints of Argentine Love located in any film archives, it is a lost film.
