= The Faithful Heart (1932 film) =

1932 film

- Directed by: Victor Saville
- Written by: Lajos Bíró; Angus MacPhail; Victor Saville; Robert Stevenson
- Based on: The Faithful Heart by Monckton Hoffe
- Produced by: Michael Balcon
- Starring: Herbert Marshall; Edna Best; Anne Grey
- Cinematography: Mutz Greenbaum
- Edited by: Ian Dalrymple
- Music by: Louis Levy
- Production company: Gainsborough Pictures
- Distributed by: Ideal Films
- Release date: May 1932
- Running time: 83 minutes
- Country: United Kingdom
- Language: English

The Faithful Heart is a 1932 British drama film directed by Victor Saville and starring Herbert Marshall, Edna Best and Anne Grey. It is based on the 1921 play The Faithful Heart by Monckton Hoffe. It was made at Islington Studios of Gainsborough Pictures in London. The film's sets were designed by Alex Vetchinsky.

== Plot ==
At the turn of the century, a young waitress has a fling with a sailor on leave. He then departs for South Africa to fight in the Boer War and enjoys a distinguished career and is awarded a Victoria Cross for heroics in the First World War. Engaged to a high society heiress, his new status is changed by the sudden arrival of his long-lost daughter, the identical image of her now-deceased mother.

== Cast ==
- Herbert Marshall as Waverly Ango
- Edna Best as Blackie
- Mignon O'Doherty as Miss Gattiscombe
- Laurence Hanray as The Major
- Anne Grey as Diana
- Athole Stewart as Sir Gilbert Oughterson

== Bibliography ==
- Wood, Linda. British Films, 1927-1939. British Film Institute, 1986.
