= Robert Douglas (actor) =

English actor (1909–1999)

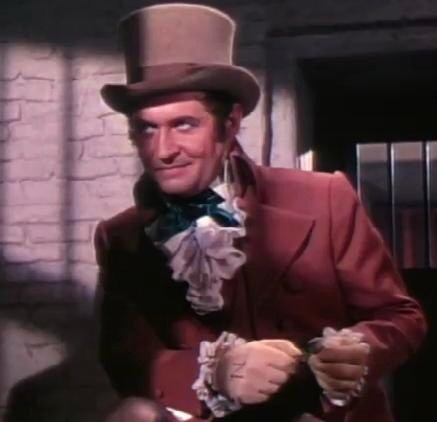
- Douglas in Buccaneer's Girl (1950)
- Born: Robert Douglas Finlayson; 9 November 1909; Fenny Stratford, Buckinghamshire, England
- Died: 11 January 1999 (aged 89); Encinitas, California, U.S.
- Occupations: Actor, director, producer
- Years active: 1927–1982
- Spouses: Dorothy Hyson (m. 1935; div. 1945) Suzanne Weldon (m. 1946; died 1995)
- Children: 2

Robert Douglas Finlayson (9 November 1909 – 11 January 1999), known professionally as Robert Douglas, was an English stage and film actor, a television director and producer.

== Early life ==
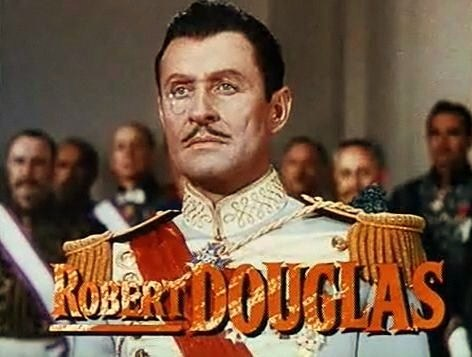
Douglas in The Prisoner of Zenda (1952)

Douglas was born in Fenny Stratford, Buckinghamshire. He studied at RADA and made his stage debut at the Theatre Royal, Bournemouth in 1927. A year later he made his first London appearance in Many Waters at the Ambassadors Theatre and went into films the following year.

== Career ==
=== As an actor ===
==== Theatre ====
- 1927: The Best People (Theatre Royal Bournemouth + tour)
- 1928: Crime (Grand Theatre Croydon + tour)
- 1928: Many Waters (Ambassadors Theatre London)
- 1928: Mrs.Moonlight (Kingsway Theatre London)
- 1929: Black St. Anthony (Strand Theatre London)
- 1929: A Bill of Divorcement (St.Martin's Theatre London)
- 1929: Barbara's Wedding (Apollo Theatre London)
- 1929: Many Waters (in UK, in Canada / Maxine Elliott's Theatre, Broadway + Times Square Theatre Broadway)
- 1930: The Last Enemy (Fortune Theatre London)
- 1930: Suspense (Duke of York's Theatre London)
- 1930: Badger's Green (Prince of Wales Theatre London)
- 1930: The Last Enemy (Hartford / New Haven + Shubert Theatre Broadway)
- 1931: After All (Criterion Theatre London + The New Theatre London)
- 1931: The Arch-Duchess (Phoenix-Theatre London)
- 1931: Vile Bodies (Arts Theatre London)
- 1931: Brief Moment (Detroit / Washington + Belasco Theatre Broadway + Cort Theatre Broadway)
- 1932: Vile Bodies (Vaudeville Theatre London)
- 1932: As it was in the Beginning (Arts Theatre London)
- 1933: Ten Minute Alibi (Embassy Theatre London + Haymarket Theatre London)
- 1933: These Two (Arts Theatre London)
- 1934: Men in White (Lyric Theatre London + tour)
- 1934: Overture 1920 (Phoenix Theatre London)
- 1934: Inside the Room (Queens Theatre London)
- 1935: Theatre Royal / The Royal Family (Lyric Theatre London + tour)
- 1935: Most of the Game (Cort Theatre Broadway)
- 1936: No Exit (Embassy Theatre London + St.Martin's Theatre London)
- 1936: Stubble before Swords (Globe Theatre London)
- 1936: Kind Lady (The King's Theatre Edinburgh + Lyric Theatre London)
- 1938: Official Secret (Tour + New Theatre London)
- 1938: Night Arrival (Globe Theatre London)
- 1939: The Spring Time of Others (Gate Theatre London)
- 1946: Lighten our Darkness (New Theatre Hull + tour)
- 1946: He Lived in Two Worlds (Wimbledon Theatre London + tour)
- 1946: But for the Grace of God (Royal Lyceum Theatre Edinburgh + tour + St.James Theatre London)

==== Film ====
- 1930: P. C. Josser (dir. Milton Rosmer) - Dick Summers
- 1931: Many Waters (dir. Milton Rosmer) - Godfrey Marvin
- 1933: The Blarney Stone / (US): The Blarney Kiss (dir. Tom Walls) - Lord Breethorpe
- 1935: Death Drives Through (dir. Edward L. Cahn) - Kit Woods
- 1937: London Melody / (US): Girl in the Street (dir. Herbert Wilcox) - Nigel Taplow
- 1937: Our Fighting Navy / (US): Torpedoed (dir. Norman Walker) - Captain Markham
- 1938: The Challenge (dir. Milton Rosmer) - Edward Whymper
- 1939: Over the Moon (dir. Thornton Freeland) - The Unknown Man
- 1939: The Lion Has Wings (dir. Michael Powell) - Briefing Officer
- 1940: The Chinese Bungalow / (US): Chinese Den (dir. George King) - Richard Marquess
- 1947: The End of the River (dir. Derek N. Twist) - Jones
- 1948: The Adventures of Don Juan / (GB): The New Adventures of Don Juan (dir. Vincent Sherman) - Duke de Lorca
- 1948: The Decision of Christopher Blake (dir. Peter Godfrey) - Ken Blake
- 1949: Homicide (dir. Felix Jacoves) - Police Lieutenant Michael Landers
- 1949: The Fountainhead (dir. King Vidor) - Ellsworth M. Toohey
- 1949: The Hasty Heart (dir. Vincent Sherman) - Off-Screen Narrator (voice, uncredited)
- 1949: The Lady Takes a Sailor (dir. Michael Curtiz) - John Tyson
- 1950: Buccaneer's Girl (dir. Frederick De Cordova) - Narbonne
- 1950: Barricade (dir. Peter Godfrey) - Aubrey Milburn
- 1950: Spy Hunt / (GB): Panther's Moon (dir. George Sherman) - Stephen Paradou
- 1950: This Side of the Law (dir. Richard L. Bare) - Philip Cagle
- 1950: The Flame and the Arrow (dir. Jacques Tourneur) - Marchese Alessandro de Granazia
- 1950: Kim (dir. Victor Saville) - Colonel Creighton
- 1950: Mystery Submarine (dir. Douglas Sirk) - Commander Eric von Molter
- 1951: Target Unknown (dir. George Sherman) - Colonel von Broeck
- 1951: Thunder on the Hill / (GB): Bonaventure (dir. Douglas Sirk) - Dr. Edward Jeffreys
- 1952: At Sword's Point / (GB): Sons of the Musketeers (dir. Lewis Allen) - Duc de Lavalle
- 1952: Ivanhoe (dir. Richard Thorpe) - Sir Hugh De Bracy
- 1952: The Prisoner of Zenda (dir. Richard Thorpe) - Michael, Duke of Strelsau
- 1953: Fair Wind to Java (dir. Joseph Kane) - Saint Ebenezer / Pulo Besar
- 1953: The Desert Rats (dir. Robert Wise) - General
- 1953: Flight to Tangier (dir. Charles Marquis Warren) - Danzer
- 1954: Saskatchewan / (GB): O'Rourke of the Royal Mounted (dir. Raoul Walsh) - Benton
- 1954: King Richard and the Crusaders (dir. David Butler) - Sir Giles Amaury
- 1955: The Virgin Queen (dir. Henry Koster) - Sir Christopher Hatton
- 1955: The Scarlet Coat (dir. John Sturges) - General Benedict Arnold
- 1955: Good Morning Miss Dove (dir. Henry Koster) - John Porter
- 1956: Helen of Troy (dir. Robert Wise) - Agamemnon
- 1959: The Young Philadelphians / (GB): The City Jungle (dir. Vincent Sherman) - Uncle Morton Stearnes
- 1959: Tarzan, the Ape Man (dir. Joseph M. Newman) - Colonel James Parker
- 1961: The Lawbreakers (dir. Joseph M. Newman) - Allen Bardeman (archive footage)

==== Television ====
- 1939: The Royal Family of Broadway (TV Movie) - Tony Cavendish
- 1953: Chevron Theatre (Season 2 Episode 23: "Serenade to an Empty House")
- 1955: Lux Video Theatre (Season 5 Episode 33: "The Browning Version") - Frank Hunter
- 1955: Front Row Center (Season 1 Episode 2: "The Barretts of Wimpole Street") - Robert Browning
- 1957: Panic! (Season 1 Episode 12: "The Vigilantes") - Thomas Burdue / James Stuart
- 1958-1959: Alfred Hitchcock Presents (2 episodes)
  - (Season 3 Episode 38: "Impromptu Murder") - Inspector Charles Tarrant
  - (Season 5 Episode 1: "Arthur") - Inspector Ben Liebenberg
- 1959: General Electric Theatre (Season 7 Episode 14: "And One Was Loyal") - Roger Howard
- 1959-1961: 77 Sunset Strip (2 episodes)
  - (Season 1 Episode 19: "Eyewitness") (1959) - Dr. Emory Williams
  - (Season 4 Episode 12: "Reserved for Mr. Bailey") (1961) - Walter Van Nuys (voice) (uncredited)
- 1959-1961: One Step Beyond (3 episodes)
  - (Season 1 Episode 14: "The Secret") (1959) - Harrison Ackroyd
  - (Season 2 Episode 29: "Encounter") (1960) - Paul McCord
  - (Season 3 Episode 21: "Night of Decision") (1961) - General George Washington
- 1960: Adventures in Paradise (2 episodes)
  - (Season 1 Episode 22: "There Is an Island") - Albert Otherly
  - (Season 1 Episode 25: "The Forbidden Sea") - Albert Othery
- 1960: Walt Disney presents The Swamp Fox (2 episodes)
  - (Season 6 Episode 15: "Redcoat Strategy") - General Cornwallis
  - (Season 6 Episode 16: "A Case of Treason") - General Cornwallis
- 1960: Maverick (Season 4 Episode 1: "The Bundle from Britain") - Herbert
- 1961: The Asphalt Jungle (Season 1 Episode 2: "The Lady and the Lawyer") - Allen Bardeman
- 1962: Thriller (Season 2 Episode 30: "The Specialists") - Antony Hugh Swinburne
- 1968: Secret Ceremony (TV-Version) - Sir Alex Gordon
- 1972: Portrait: The Woman I Love (TV Movie) - Prime Minister Stanley Baldwin
- 1974: The Questor Tapes (TV Movie) - Dr. Michaels
- 1974: Cannon (Season 3 Episode 23: "Triangle of Terror") - Sir Arnold Masters (uncredited)
- 1975: Columbo (Season 4 Episode 4: "Troubled Waters") - Dr. Frank Pierce
- 1975: Medical Center (Season 6 Episode 21: "Survivors") - Miles Halloran
- 1975: The Invisible Man (Season 1 Episode 3: "Man of Influence") - Dr. Theophilus
- 1978: Centennial (Season 1 Episode 7: "The Shepherds") - Claude Richards (final appearance)

=== As a director ===
==== Theatre ====
- 1933: Ten Minute Alibi (Haymarket Theatre London)
- 1934: Overture 1920 (Phoenix Theatre London)
- 1946: Lighten Our Darkness (New Theatre Hull)
- 1956: The Ponder Heart (Shubert Theatre New Haven + Forrest Theatre Philadelphia + Shubert Theatre Boston + Music Box Theatre Broadway)
- 1956: Affair of Honor (Ethel Barrymore Theatre Broadway)
- 1956: The Loud Red Patrick (Walnut Theatre Philadelphia + Ambassador Theatre Broadway)
- 1956: Uncle Willie (Locust Street Theatre Philadelphia + John Golden Theatre Broadway)
- 1957: One Foot in the Door (Locust Street Theatre Philadelphia + Shubert Theatre Boston)

==== Film ====
- 1964: Night Train to Paris

==== Television ====
- 1960-1962: Surfside 6 (9 episodes)
- 1960: Maverick (2 episodes)
- 1960-1962: 77 Sunset Strip (12 episodes)
- 1961: The Roaring Twenties (episode The Red Carpet)
- 1961-1962: Hawaiian Eye (4 episodes)
- 1962-1963: Fair Exchange (1. Segment)
- 1963-1964: The Alfred Hitchcock Hour (4 episodes)
- 1962: The Virginian (episode The Final Hour) = The Final Hour (film)
- 1965: Kraft Suspense Theatre (episode Kill me on July 20th)
- 1964-1965: Court Martial (3 episodes)
- 1965-1967: 12 O'Clock High (16 episodes)
- 1966: The Fugitive (episode Second Sight)
- 1966: Daniel Boone (episode The Matchmaker)
- 1967: Lost in Space (episode The Toymaker)
- 1967: Mission: Impossible (episode The Diamond)
- 1967: The Monroes (2 episodes)
- 1967-1974: The FBI (13 episodes)
- 1967-1968: The Invaders (episodes The Prophet and Counterattack)
- 1969-1970: Adam-12 (6 episodes)
- 1970: The Immortal (2 episodes)
- 1970: Dan August (episode Invitation to Murder)
- 1972-1975: The Streets of San Francisco (4 episodes)
- 1972-1973: Cannon (5 episodes)
- 1974: Barnaby Jones (2 episodes)
- 1974: Shazam! (4 episodes)
- 1974-1975: Medical Center (6 episodes)
- 1975: Swiss Family Robinson (episode The Pit)
- 1975-1978: Baretta (9 episodes)
- 1976: City of Angels (2 episodes)
- 1976: Columbo (episode Old Fashioned Murder)
- 1976-1977: Big Hawaii (episode Tightrope)
- 1977: Future Cop (2 episodes)
- 1977: Hunter (episode Yesterday, Upon the Stair)
- 1977: The Man from Atlantis (episode The Naked Montague)
- 1978: Quincy, M.E. (episode Double Death)
- 1979-1981: Trapper John, M.D. (4 episodes)
- 1979: Nobody's Perfect (4 episodes)
- 1982: House Calls (2 episodes)
- 1982: Fame (episode A Big Finish)

=== As a producer ===
- 1963-1964: The Alfred Hitchcock Hour (8 episodes)
- 1964-1965: Court Martial (10 episodes)

== Personal life ==
Douglas was married twice, to actresses Dorothy Hyson (1914–1996) and Suzanne Weldon (1921–1995), fathering two children, Lucinda and Robert (Giles). He died from natural causes in Encinitas, California, aged 89.
