= How've You Bean? =

1933 film

- Directed by: Alfred J. Goulding
- Written by: Jack Henley; Glen Lambert
- Produced by: Samuel Sax
- Starring: Fatty Arbuckle
- Production company: Warner Bros.
- Distributed by: Warner Bros.
- Release date: June 24, 1933
- Running time: 18 minutes
- Country: United States
- Language: English

How've You Bean? is a 1933 American Pre-Code comedy film starring Fatty Arbuckle, the last short film released before his death. Willie and Abner are invited to their Army buddy Jimmy's fancy wedding; they decide to cook up "a mess of beans" to recall their old times together (thus the title pun). Their plan goes badly in a comic way.

== Cast ==
- Roscoe "Fatty" Arbuckle as Abner
- Jean Hubert
- Fritz Hubert as Willie
- Mildred Van Dorn as The Bride, Betty
- Phillip Ryder as Jimmy
- Edmund Elton as The Mayor
- Dora Mills Adams as Mother of the Groom
- Paul Clare
- Charles Howard
- Herbert Warren

== See also ==
- Fatty Arbuckle filmography
