= The Faithful Heart (1922 film) =

1922 film

- Directed by: Fred Paul
- Written by: Walter Summers
- Produced by: G.B. Samuelson
- Starring: Owen Nares; Lillian Hall-Davis; Cathleen Nesbitt; Cyril Raymond
- Cinematography: Sydney Blythe
- Production company: British-Super Films
- Release date: 1922
- Country: United Kingdom
- Language: English

The Faithful Heart is a 1922 British drama film directed by Fred Paul and starring Owen Nares, Lillian Hall-Davis and Cathleen Nesbitt. It is an adaptation of the play The Faithful Heart by Monckton Hoffe.

== Cast ==
- Owen Nares – Waverley Ango
- Lillian Hall-Davis – Blackie Anderway
- Cathleen Nesbitt – Diana Oughterson
- A.B. Imeson – Major Lestrade
- Ruth Maitland – Mrs Gattiscombe
- Cyril Raymond – Albert Oughterson
- Victor Tandy – Sergeant Brabazon
- Charles Thursby – Captain Ralkjam
