= Dr. Jekyll and Mr. Hyde (1920 Haydon film) =

1920 film

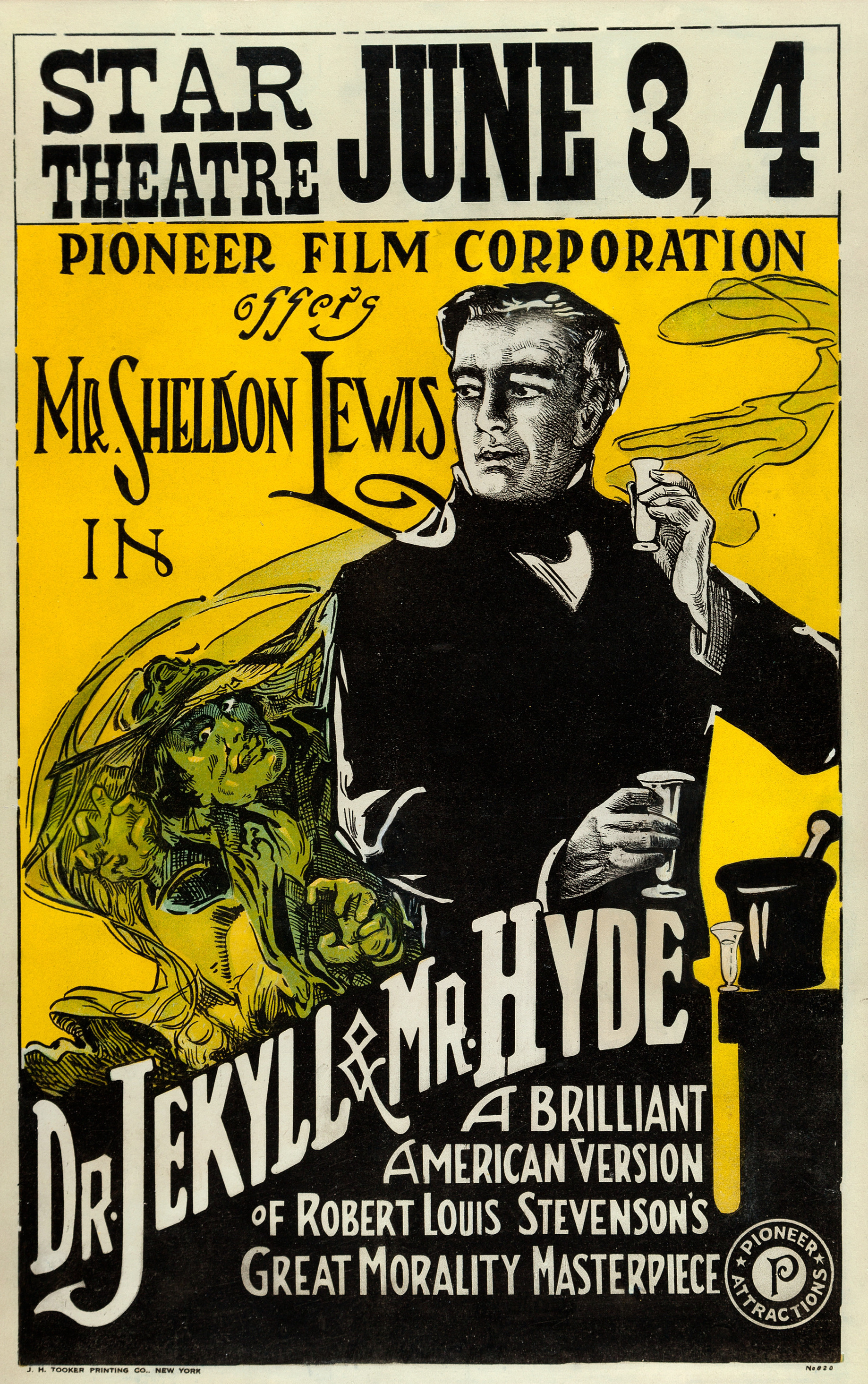
- Window card
- Directed by: J. Charles Haydon
- Written by: J. Charles Haydon
- Based on: Strange Case of Dr. Jekyll and Mr. Hyde; 1886 novella by Robert Louis Stevenson
- Produced by: Louis Meyer
- Starring: Sheldon Lewis
- Release date: April 1920
- Running time: 60 minutes
- Country: United States
- Languages: Silent film English intertitles

Dr. Jekyll and Mr. Hyde is a 1920 horror film directed and written by J. Charles Haydon, starring Sheldon Lewis, based on the 1886 novel Strange Case of Dr. Jekyll and Mr. Hyde by Robert Louis Stevenson. The Sheldon Lewis version was somewhat overshadowed by the 1920 Paramount Pictures version starring John Barrymore, which had been released just the month before.

== Plot ==
The atheistic Dr. Henry Jekyll (Lewis) embarks on a series of experiments determined to segregate the two sides of the human personality, good and evil, to disprove God's existence. His experiments cause his fiancée Bernice to call off their engagement, and in a rage, he manages to unleash the darkest part of his personality as Mr. Hyde. As the first transformation into Hyde begins, Jekyll's butler exclaims that Jekyll is now "the Apostle from Hell!".

Hyde, complete with fangs and scraggy hair, skulks through the city, committing heinous acts. The police catch up with Hyde, interrogate him, jail him, and strap him into the electric chair. Sitting in his chair at home, Jekyll awakes violently from a nightmare to declare, "I believe in God! I have a soul...". He decides not to create the chemical potion and to embrace religion instead.

== Cast ==
- Sheldon Lewis as Dr. Jekyll / Mr. Hyde
- Alex Shannon as Dr. Lanyon
- Dora Mills Adams as Mrs. Lanyon
- Gladys Field as Bernice Lanyon
- Harold Foshay as Edward Utterson
- Leslie Austin as Danvers Carew

== Production ==
Three different adaptations of Robert Louis Stevenson's novel Strange Case of Dr Jekyll and Mr Hyde were released in 1920, the first being the John Barrymore Paramount version, the second the Sheldon Lewis film, and the third Der Januskopf, a German version directed by F. W. Murnau. The film's producer, Louis Meyer (not to be confused with Louis B. Mayer), was concerned about copyright infringement relating to the other two versions, and he set the film in New York and altered the plot structure, although he may have also done it also for budgetary reasons. Contemporary newspaper accounts state that this film went into production before the John Barrymore Paramount version, but the Paramount film was released first.

A satirical send-up of the John Barrymore film, produced by Hank Mann Comedies and distributed by Arrow just weeks before the company went out of business, was also distributed in 1920. Hank Mann played both Dr. Jekyll and Mr. Hyde. The film is now lost.

== Critique ==
Reviewer Troy Howarth commented "The script allows the character (of Dr. Jekyll) more background detail....but Lewis fails to bring him to life.The makeup is low key; some false teeth, matted hair and a cocked hat.....his frantic overacting makes the character unintentionally humorous....it's hard to believe even audiences of the period would've found him credibly sinister. The film was clearly made on the cheap and rushed through production." The final product was in fact so crude that director J. Charles Haydon had his name removed from the credits.

== Notes ==
Sheldon Lewis returned once again in 1929 to play Dr. Jekyll in an early one-reel sound film short.
