= His Children's Children =

1923 film by Sam Wood

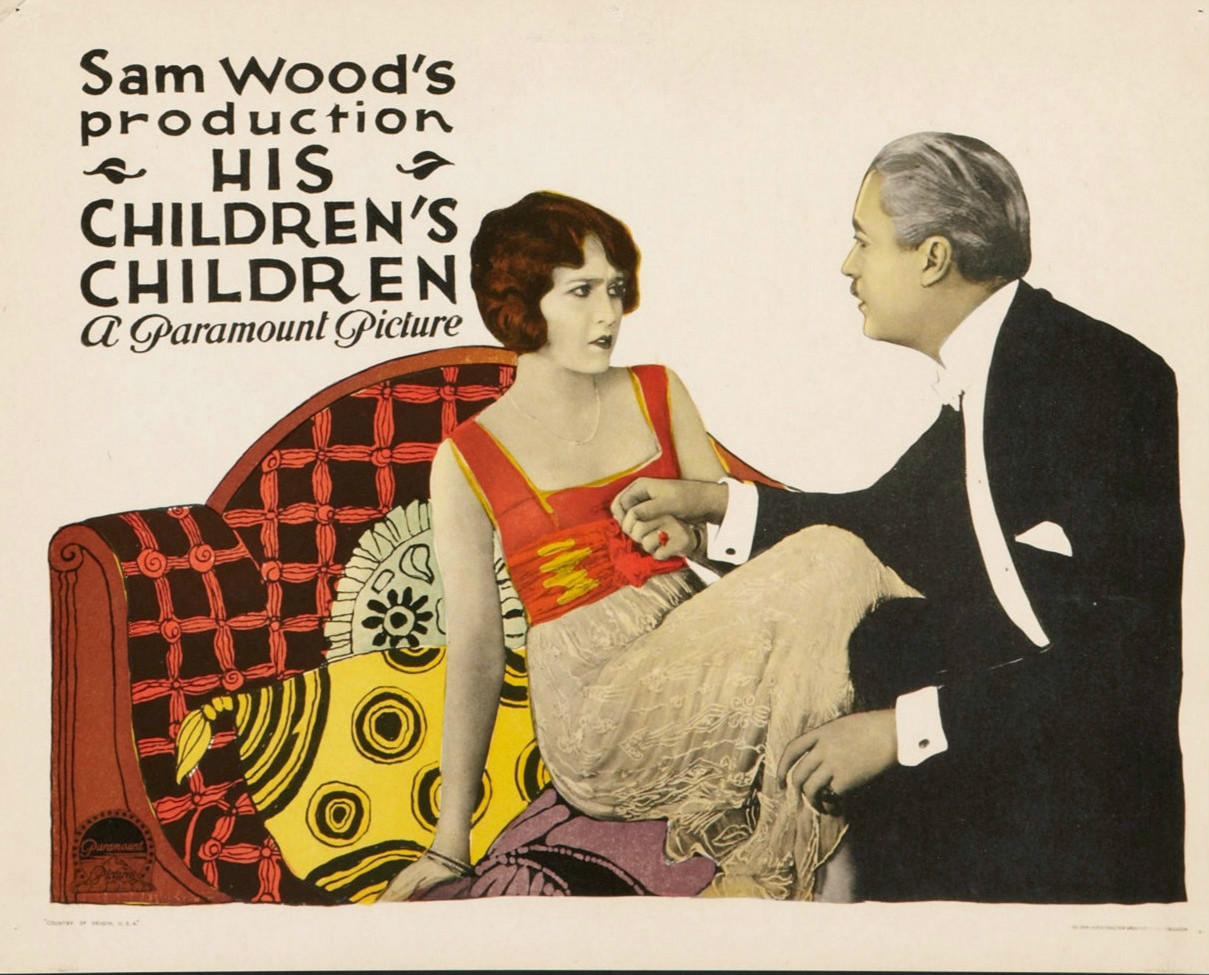
- Lobby card
- Directed by: Sam Wood
- Written by: Monte Katterjohn (scenario)
- Based on: His Children's Children by Arthur Train
- Produced by: Adolph Zukor; Jesse Lasky
- Starring: Bebe Daniels; James Rennie; Dorothy Mackaill
- Cinematography: Alfred Gilks; Osmond Borradaile (operator)
- Distributed by: Paramount Pictures
- Release date: November 4, 1923
- Running time: 70 minutes
- Country: United States
- Language: Silent (English intertitles)

His Children's Children is a lost 1923 American silent drama film directed by Sam Wood and starring the winsome Bebe Daniels. It is based on a novel, His Children's Children by Arthur Train. Famous Players–Lasky produced and Paramount Pictures distributed the film.

== Cast ==
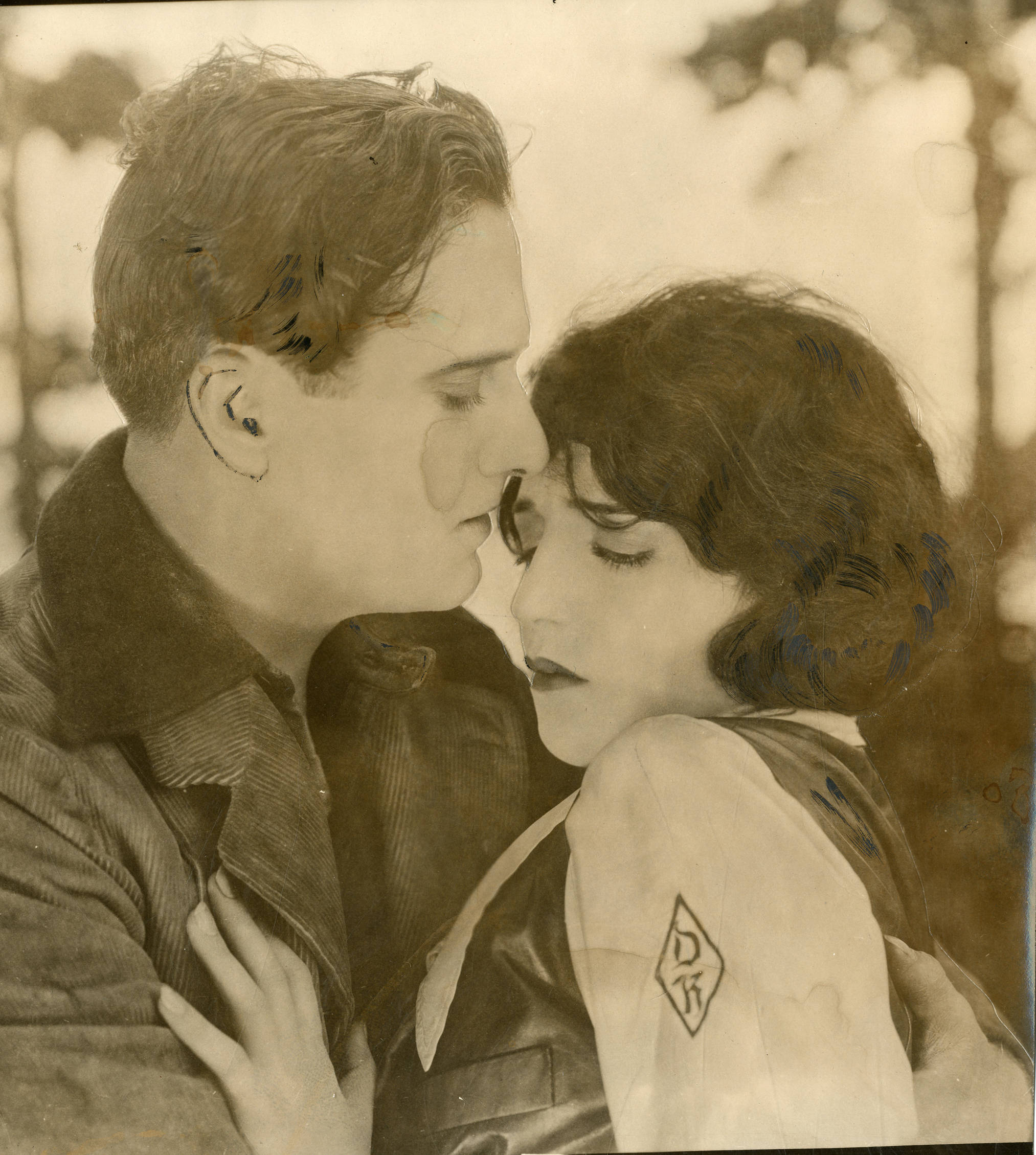
Rennie and Daniels in the film

- Bebe Daniels as Diane
- James Rennie as Lloyd Maitland
- Dorothy Mackaill as Sheila
- Hale Hamilton as Rufus Kayne
- George Fawcett as Peter B. Kayne
- Kathryn Lean as Claudia
- Mahlon Hamilton as Larry Devereaux
- Mary Eaton as Mercedes
- Warner Oland as Dr. Dahl
- John Davidson as Florian
- Lawrence D'Orsay as Mr. Pepperill
- Sally Crute as Mrs. Wingate
- Joseph Burke as Uncle Billy McGaw
- Templar Powell as Lord Harrowdale
- Dora Mills Adams as Mrs. Rufus Kayne
- H. Cooper Cliffe as Attorney Krabfleisch

unbilled cast

- Jack Oakie -
- Betty Bronson -
- Kit Wain
