= Ruth Maitland =

English actress (1880–1961)

- 1939 Spotlight photo (B.I.P. still)
- Born: Emma Christian Ruth Erskine; 3 February 1880; London, England
- Died: 12 March 1961 (aged 81); Dorking, England
- Occupation: Actress
- Spouse: James Seafield Grant (m. 1918; died 1921)

Ruth Maitland (born Emma Christian Ruth Erskine; 3 February 1880 – 12 March 1961) was an English actress. She is known for her roles in The Faithful Heart (1922), The Farmer's Wife (1928), The Only Girl (1933), and At the Villa Rose (1940). On stage, her appearances included the original production of the musical Mister Cinders at London's Adelphi Theatre in 1929–1930.

She married Major James Seafield Grant on 6 August 1918. He was killed in 1921 in the Coolavokig ambush during the Irish War of Independence.

== Selected filmography ==
- The Faithful Heart (1922)
- The Farmer's Wife (1928)
- Bed and Breakfast (1930)
- Tin Gods (1932)
- Going Gay (1933)
- The Only Girl (1933)
- Rolling Home (1935)
- Aren't Men Beasts! (1937)
- A Spot of Bother (1938)
- At the Villa Rose (1940)
- The Second Mr. Bush (1940)
- It Happened to One Man (1940)
- Old Mother Riley in Business (1941)
- We'll Smile Again (1942)
