= James Rennie (actor) =

Canadian actor (1889–1965)

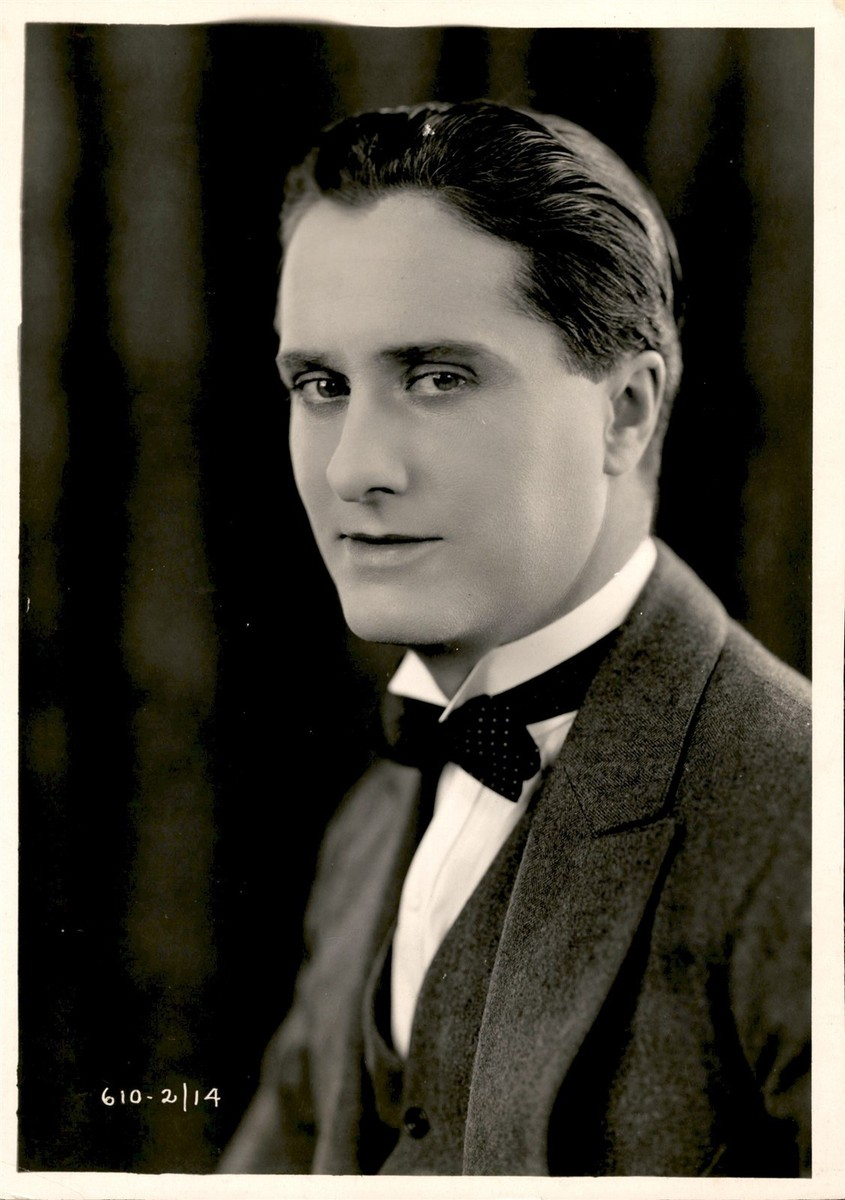
- Rennie in a promotional photo for His Children's Children (1923)
- Born: April 18, 1889; Toronto, Ontario, Canada
- Died: July 31, 1965 (aged 76); New York City, U.S.
- Occupations: Stage and film actor
- Years active: 1920–1945
- Spouses: Dorothy Gish (m. 1920; div. 1935); Sara Eldon McConnell (m. 1939)

James Malachi Rennie (April 18, 1889 – July 31, 1965) was a Canadian American actor who performed on the New York stage and also appeared in several Hollywood films during the 1920s, 1930s and 1940s. He became a U.S. citizen in New York in 1933.

== Early life ==
Of Scottish descent, he was born on April 18, 1889, in Toronto, Ontario, Canada, the son of John and Margaret Rennie, both of whom were Mormon. As a youth he acted in a number of stage productions including roles in such Shakespearean plays as Romeo and Juliet, Hamlet, and A Midsummer Night's Dream. It wasn't long before he was bit by the acting bug. In June 1917, during World War I, Rennie enrolled in the Canadian Expeditionary Force and became a part of the University of Toronto's Officers Training Company; while involved in this he and other officers would put on their own productions to show to the general public. He served in France for two years as a British Royal Flying Corps pilot.

After the war ended in November 1918, Rennie decided to leave Canada for California to begin a career in American films. In the 1920s, Rennie divided his time between New York's Broadway stage and making silent films. The first stage play in which he won his first acclaim was Moonlight and Honeysuckle (1919). He later starred in The Great Gatsby (1926) and Julius Caesar (1927).

== Film career ==
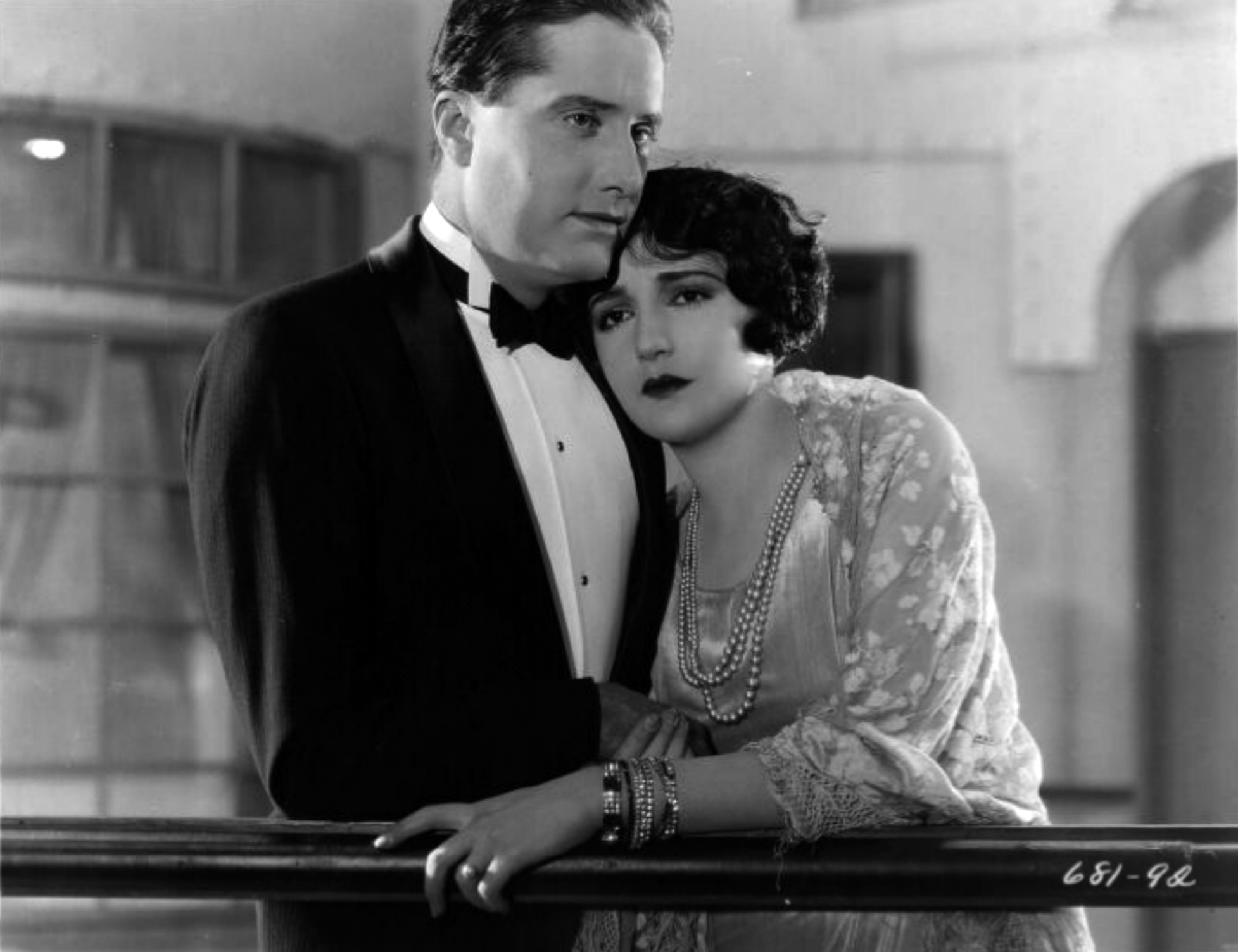
Rennie and Bebe Daniels in Argentine Love (1924)

His first film role came in Remodeling Her Husband, and while making that film he met Dorothy Gish and they began a romantic relationship. In December 1920 they were married in a double wedding ceremony alongside actress Constance Talmadge who was a good friend of Gish. Now that Rennie was married and had Lillian Gish as a sister-in-law many doors began to open for him. His next film role was as Robert Van Nuys in Flying Pat opposite his sister-in-law in the role of her husband.

During the 1920s he made ten other appearances in silent films between 1922 and 1926; his other silent film credits included roles in Dust Flower (1922), The Bad Man (1923), The Moral Sinner (1924), Restless Wives (1924), Clothes Make the Pirate (1925), and the 1926 version of Camille with Anita Loos in the title role. After the release of Camille Rennie took four years away from film making to take more time in his marriage to Dorothy. During his hiatus talking films revolutionized the film industry.

== Career in sound films ==
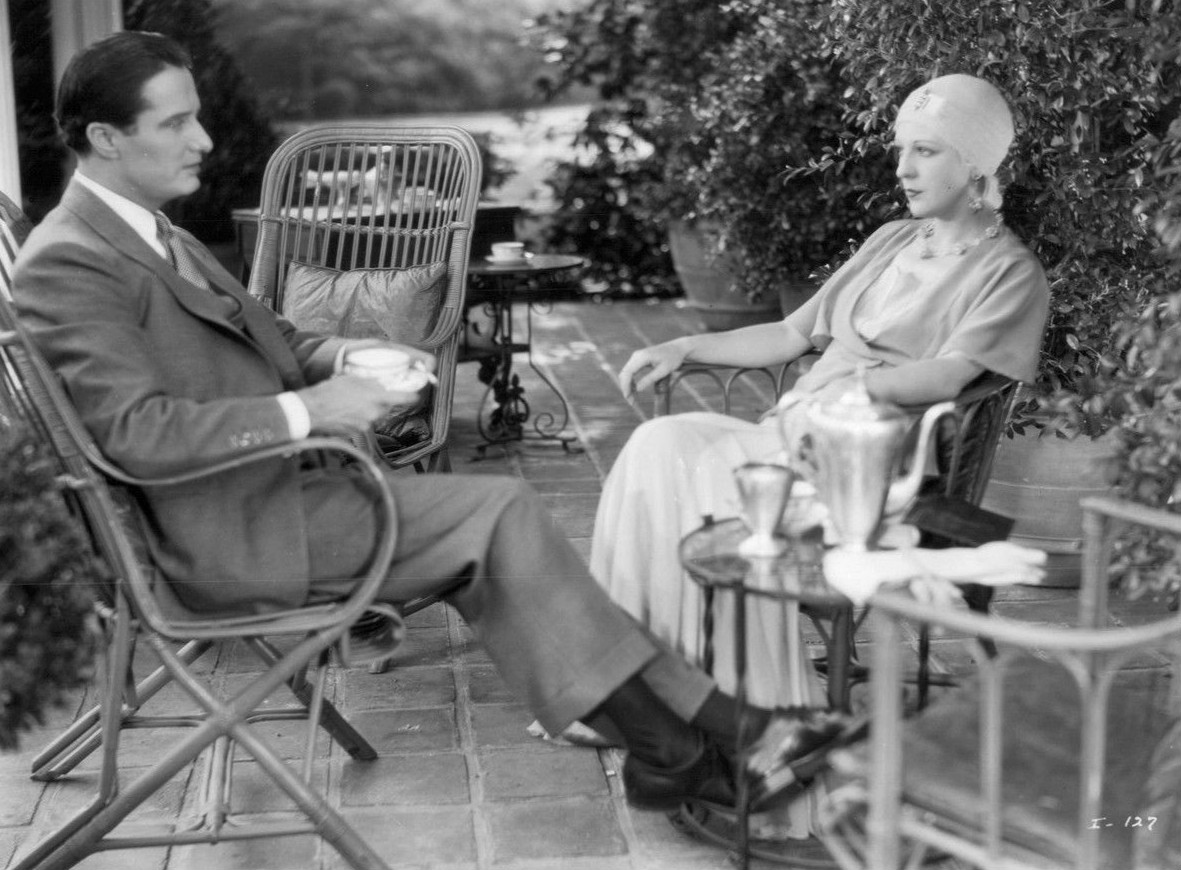
Rennie and Natalie Moorhead in Illicit (1931)

In 1930, Rennie made his return to the American screen in his talking debut in a sound remake of The Bad Man originating the role he played in the original version. He would make six other sound films between 1932 and 1933; during this time he began co-starring with some of Hollywood's other silent film stars making the transition to sound films as well as up-and-coming actors who would gain their popularity by decade's end; they including the likes of Ann Harding in Girl of the Golden West (1930), Barbara Stanwyck in Illicit (1931), Richard Barthelmess, Mary Astor, and Marian Nixon in The Lash (1931), Dorothy Mackaill and Donald Cook in Party Husband (1931), and Olive Borden in The Divorce Racket (1932). In 1933, he made one more film entitled The Little Damozel opposite Anna Neagle and upon the film's completion he did not return to the screen for seven years.

== Later stage and screen career and retirement ==
By 1934, Rennie's union with Dorothy Gish was disintegrating and on October 11, 1935, he and Gish divorced. In the following year he became a naturalized citizen of the United States. In 1939 he married a Warner Bros. dress extra named Sara Eldon McConnell who had been a divorcee herself a few years prior to their marriage. In 1941, he returned to the screen in the role of Ned Franklyn in Skylark opposite such acclaimed performers as Claudette Colbert, Ray Milland, Brian Aherne, and Grant Mitchell. After his screen return Rennie found that he enjoyed being back to the art of screen acting. However, as with the case of Ona Munson, Hollywood wasn't kind to the actors who abandoned the film industry during the midpoint of the early sound era and decent roles were difficult to find.

Meanwhile, his career on the New York stage continued to flourish. He starred in many Broadway productions, including Murder at the Vanities (1933–34); Divided By Three (1935); Knock on Wood (1935); Co-Respondent Unknown (1936) with Ilka Chase; Miss Quis (1937); I Must Love Someone (1939) with Martha Sleeper; Russian Bank (1940), One Man Show (1945) with Constance Cummings and Frank Conroy; Remains to be Seen (1951); and Four Winds (1957), with Ann Todd, Conrad Nagel and Carl Esmond. He also toured in many plays and appeared in off-Broadway productions including State of the Union (1947), with Neil Hamilton and Erin O'Brien-Moore; Mister Roberts (1949) with John Forsythe and Jackie Cooper; and Annie Get Your Gun (1958), with Betty Jane Watson.

In his later Hollywood years, Rennie would appear in brief, bit but memorable parts in such films as Now, Voyager with Bette Davis and the star-studded Tales of Manhattan (1942) whose grand cast consisted of such talents as Charles Boyer, Ginger Rogers, Rita Hayworth, Edward G. Robinson, Henry Fonda, Charles Laughton, and Cesar Romero. In 1945, Rennie made his last screen appearance in A Bell for Adano and upon the film's completion he retired from films. Moving to New York City, he and his wife would live comfortably, thanks to all the fortunes Rennie had earned and saved from his acting days. During his retirement Rennie devoted his time to his wife and was active in his church, The Church of Jesus Christ of Latter-day Saints (LDS Church).

== Death ==
On July 31, 1965, at age 76, Rennie died due to heart failure in his New York apartment (or at Harkness Pavilion). James was cremated, his ashes were interred at Ferncliff Cemetery and Mausoleum, in Hartsdale, New York.

== Filmography ==
Year	Film	Role	Notes
1920	Remodeling Her Husband	Jack Valentine	Lost film
1920	Flying Pat	Robert Van Nuys	
1922	Stardust	Thomas Clemons	
1922	The Dust Flower	Rashleigh Allerton	
1923	Mighty Lak' a Rose	Jimmy Harrison	Lost film
1923	The Bad Man		
1923	His Children's Children	Lloyd Maitland	
1924	Restless Wives	James Benson	
1924	The Moral Sinner	Paul Sylvain	Lost film
1924	Argentine Love	Philip Sears	Lost film
	Clothes Make the Pirate	Lieutenant Cavendish	Lost film
	Share and Share Alike	Sam Jefford	
1926	Camille	Philippe	Short film
1930	The Bad Man	Gilbert Jones	
1930	The Girl of the Golden West	Dick Johnson	Lost film
1930	The Lash	David Howard	
1930	An Intimate Dinner in Celebration of Warner Bros. Silver Jubilee	Self	Short film
1931	Illicit	'Dick' Ives II	
1931	Party Husband	Jay Hogarth	
1932	The Divorce Racket	Detective Malcom 'Duke' Ayres	
1933	The Little Damozel	Recky Poole	
1939	The Glass Case	Robert Williams	Short film
1941	Skylark	Ned Franklyn	
1942	Crossroads	Monsieur Charles Martin	uncredited
1942	Tales of Manhattan	H.R. 'Hank' Bronson (Robinson sequence)	
1942	Now, Voyager	Frank McIntyre	
1944	Wilson	Jim Beeker	
1945	A Bell for Adano	Lt. Colonel Sartorius	Uncredited, (final film role)
