= Mighty Lak' a Rose (film) =

1923 film

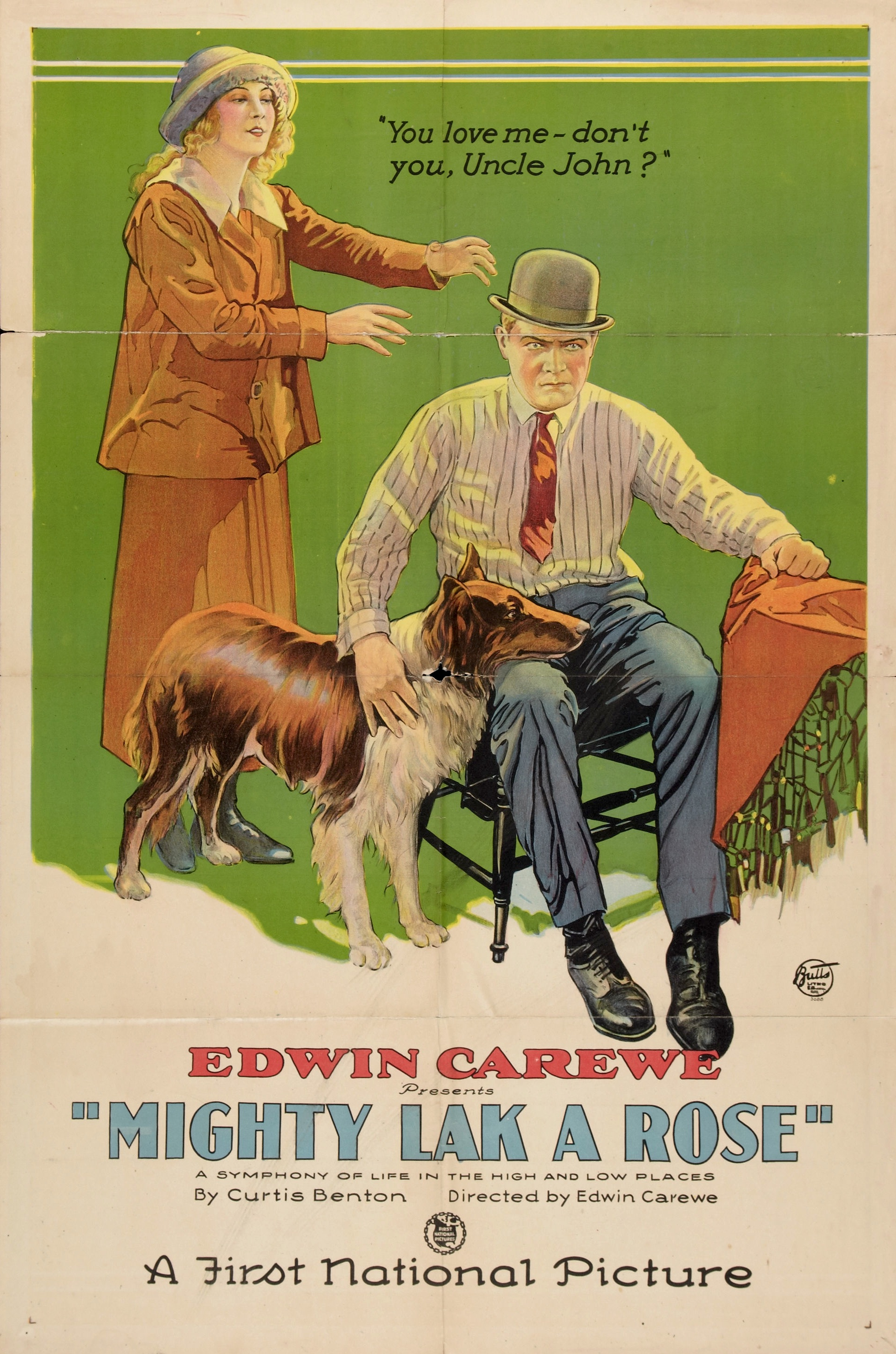
- Contemporary movie poster
- Directed by: Edwin Carewe; Philip Masi (assistant director)
- Written by: Adelaide Heilbron (scenario); George V. Hobart (intertitles)
- Story by: Curtis Benton
- Produced by: Edwin Carewe
- Starring: James Rennie; Dorothy Mackaill; Anders Randolf
- Cinematography: Sol Polito
- Edited by: Robert De Lacey
- Distributed by: Associated First National Pictures
- Release date: February 13, 1923 (United States)
- Running time: 80 minutes
- Country: United States
- Language: Silent (English intertitles)

Mighty Lak' a Rose is a 1923 American silent drama film produced and directed by Edwin Carewe and distributed by Associated First National, later First National Pictures. This film stars James Rennie, Anders Randolf, and Dorothy Mackaill in her first starring role.

== Plot ==
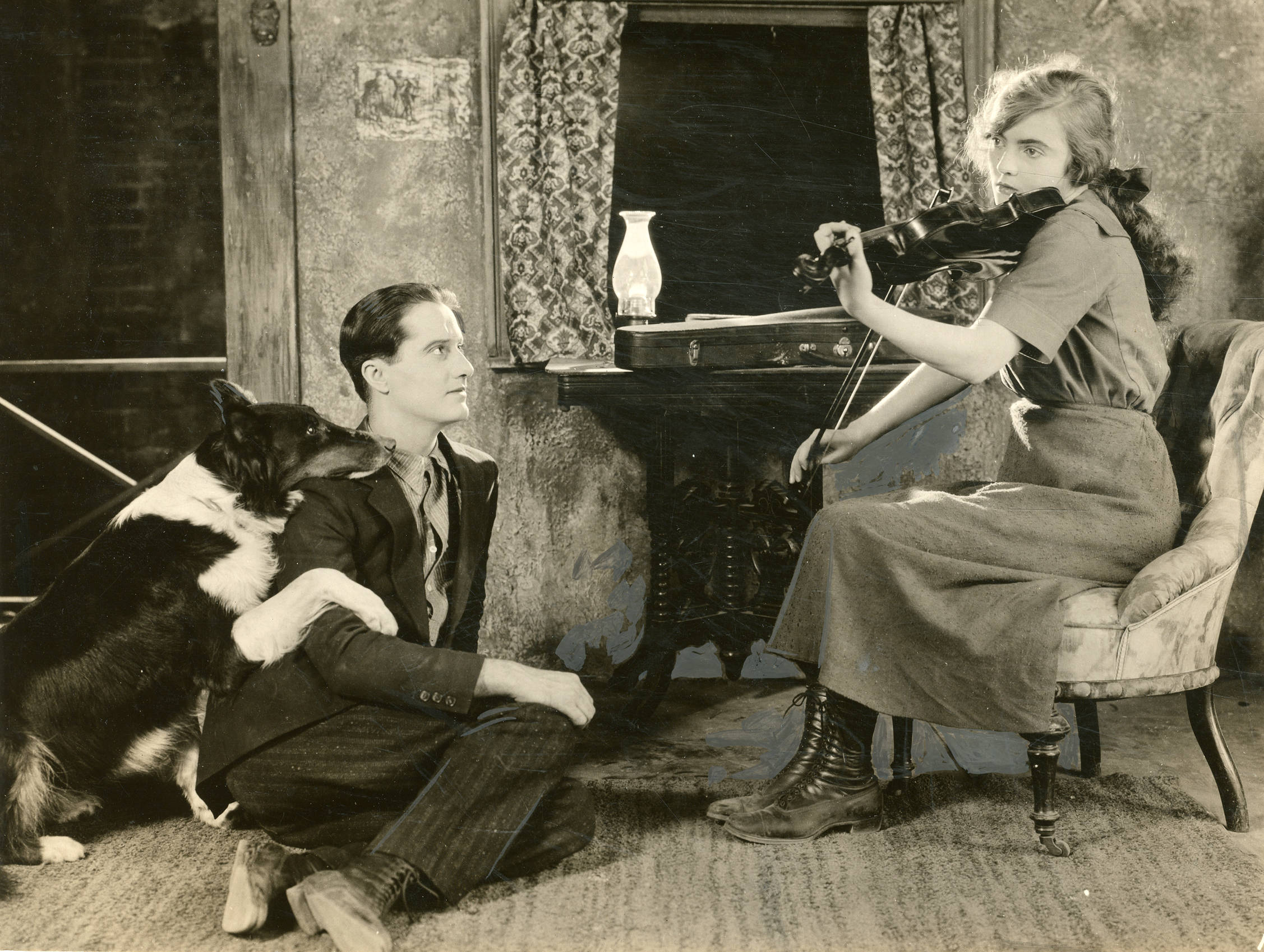
Rennie and Mackaill in the film

As described in a film magazine, Jerome Trevor, international pianist, pays a visit to an orphanage and is deeply struck by the talent of blind lass Rose Duncan for violin playing. Learning that she has an uncle in New York City, he decides to make arrangements by which she can live with her relative and be advanced in her art. But while on her way, her uncle is killed by an automobile. Rose at Pennsylvania Station meets gang leader Bull Morgan. In order to avoid arrest, Bull poses as her uncle, intending to desert her later that day. Later some gangsters direct Rose to Bull's headquarters. Bull realizes that the young blind woman could become a useful aid and she becomes a member of the gang. Jimmy Harrison, a member of the gang, falls under the magic of Roses's wonderful music and her gentle ways. Rose is unaware that she is consorting with criminals and utilized to attract people to the front of a house while the gang operates in the rear. Finally Jimmy and Bull engage in a fight over Rose, and she is accidentally hit over the head and knocked senseless. While she is ill, her pleading with the gang has such good results that even Bull gives in and all resolve to take the straight path. However, after a famous surgeon states that Rose's sight can be restored by an operation, the gang decides to commit one final robbery to obtain the money. As a result, Jimmy is arrested and sent to jail. Jerome finds Rose and her music training is assured and her sight restored. Unaware of his arrest, she thinks Jimmy has deserted her. At the end of two years, Rose makes a successful debut. Jimmy, finally released, goes with his old companions to the reception to honor Rose. Although her gratitude to Jerome has led to an engagement with him, she breaks it in favor of the faithful Jimmy.

== Cast ==
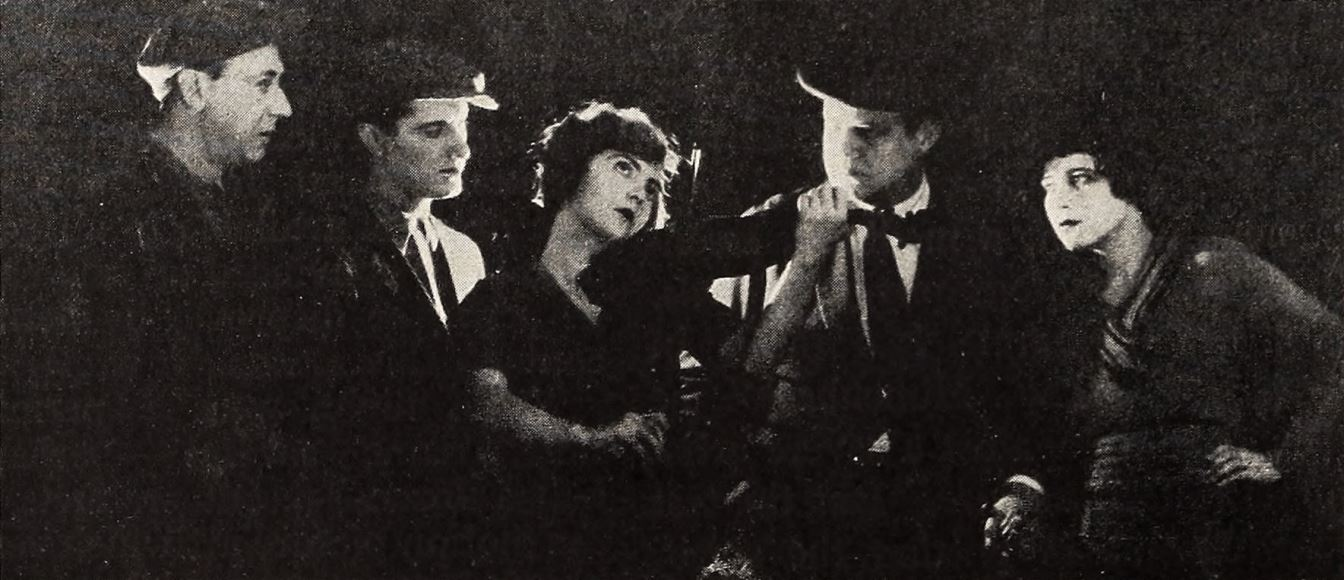
L-R: Panzer, Rennie, Mackaill, Randolf, and Adams in the film

- James Rennie as Jimmy Harrison
- Sam Hardy as Jerome Trevor
- Anders Randolf as Bull Morgan
- Harry Short as 'Slippery Eddie' Foster
- Dorothy Mackaill as Rose Duncan
- Helene Montrose as 'Hard-Boiled' Molly Malone
- Paul Panzer as Humpty Logan
- Dora Mills Adams as Mrs. Trevor

== Preservation ==
With no prints of Mighty Lak' a Rose located in any film archives, it is considered a lost film.
