= London Melody =

- Directed by: Herbert Wilcox
- Written by: Monckton Hoffe; Florence Tranter
- Based on: a story by Ray Lewis
- Produced by: Herbert Wilcox
- Starring: Anna Neagle; Tullio Carminati; Robert Douglas; Horace Hodges
- Cinematography: Freddie Young
- Edited by: Frederick Wilson
- Music by: Geraldo
- Production company: Herbert Wilcox Productions
- Distributed by: General Film Distributors
- Release date: 4 February 1937
- Running time: 75 minutes
- Country: United Kingdom
- Language: English

London Melody (also known as Girls in the Street and Look Out for Love) is a 1937 British musical film directed by Herbert Wilcox and starring Anna Neagle, Tullio Carminati and Robert Douglas. It was made at British and Dominions Imperial Studios, Elstree and Pinewood Studios by Wilcox's independent production company and distributed by J. Arthur Rank's General Film Distributors.

== Synopsis ==
While in London on business, cultured Italian diplomat Marius makes the chance acquaintance of boisterous cockney street entertainer Jacqueline. It is love at first sight, but hero and heroine must undergo a dizzying series of roadblocks and misunderstandings before the climactic clinch. Meanwhile, Jacqueline rises to the top of show-business success, never dreaming (until the end, at least) that it is all the secret handiwork of faithful Marius.

== Cast ==
- Anna Neagle as Jacqueline
- Tullio Carminati as Marius Andreani
- Robert Douglas as Nigel Taplow
- Horace Hodges as Father Donnelly
- Grizelda Harvey as friend of Marius
- Miki Hood as friend of Marius
- Davina Craig as maid
- Joan Kemp-Welch as maid
- Arthur Chesney as Marius' butler
- Leonard Snelling as organ grinder's son
- Henry Wolston as Alfred Snodgrass
- A. Bromley Davenport as General Taplow
- Ronald Shiner as pickpocket on trial
- Geraldo as bandleader
- Linden Travers as woman in night club
- Raymond Huntley as policeman outside nightclub
- Sebastian Smith as gambler

== Production ==
London Melody was one of several Anna Neagle-Tullio Carminati vehicles of the era. British and Dominions Imperial Studios were destroyed by fire in the early morning of 9 February 1936, necessitating the move of the production to Pinewood. It was the first film shot at Pinewood.

== Critical reception ==
The Monthly Film Bulletin wrote: "Anna Neagle sings and dances well, does her best with a rather inane part. Tullio Carminati as Marius is an attractive and convincing 'diplomat' (the precise nature of his post is somewhat of a mystery). Horace Hodges gives a pleasant study as an old priest. The rest of the cast tend to give the impression that neither they nor the director believed in the story."

In 1937, The Sydney Morning Herald called it an "attractive and well-acted picture...Produced and directed by Herbert Wilcox in a way that contrasts favourably with Hollywood's efforts in a similar direction...Anna Neagle, a gifted actress, with definite charm and personality, makes a delightful Jacqueline. As the diplomat...Tulllo Carminati lends distinction and poise to his role. Perhaps the best character in the film is the priest, Horace Hodges, a lovable and very human person. Robert Douglas makes a good impression in the rather inconsistent part of Nigel Taplow, Andreani's secretary".

Sky Movies described it as "a very thin musical vehicle for Anna Neagle, bizarrely cast as a cockney street singer. This dated offering... will prove tough going for all but hardened Neagle fans today."
