= Dora Mills Adams =

American film actress

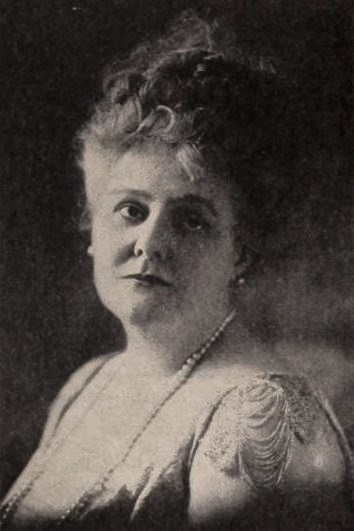
- Dora Mills Adams in 1921
- Born: October 24, 1874; Brooklyn, New York, U.S.
- Died: July 31, 1943 (aged 68); Brooklyn, New York, U.S.
- Resting place: Woodlawn Cemetery in Bronx, New York
- Occupation: Film actress
- Spouse: Lindsey Adams
- Children: 1

Dora Mills Adams (October 24, 1874 – July 31, 1943) was an American film actress. She is best known for her appearance in the short film Dr Jeykll and Mr Hyde as Mrs. Lanyon.

== Career ==
Mills entered the New York film industry near its birth in 1914 and may have been in theatre or vaudeville beforehand. As one of the older and plumper actresses she usually played matriarchal roles.

Mills died of myocarditis on July 31, 1943, at 485 Rugby Road in Kings County in Brooklyn, New York, at the age of 68. She is buried in the Locust Section of Woodlawn Cemetery, Bronx.

== Filmography ==
Year	Title	Role	Notes
1915	Runaway June	Mrs. Moore	
1915	The Moth and the Flame	Mrs. Walton	
1916	My Lady Incog	Mrs. De Veaux	
1916	The Summer Girl	Mrs. Anderson	
1916	A Coney Island Princess	Alice's Mother	
1917	The Recoil	Mrs. Somerset	
1917	Queen X	Mrs. Evans	
1917	Married in Name Only	Mrs. Francis	
1917	The Square Deceiver	Mrs. Pugfeather	
1918	The Passing of the Third Floor Back	Miss De Hooley	
1918	When Men Betray	Mrs. Gardner	
1918	Ashes of Love		
1919	Piccadilly Jim	Mrs. Peter Pett	
1920	Determination		
1920	Dr Jeykll and Mr Hyde	Mrs. Lanyon	Short Film
1921	You Find It Everywhere	Mrs. Normand	
1922	A Pasteboard Crown	Claire Morrell	
1923	Mighty Lak' a Rose	Mrs. Trevor	
1923	His Children's Children	Mrs. Rufus Kayne	
1924	Flying Fists		
1929	Playmates		Short Film
1933	How've You Bean?	Mother of the Groom	Short Film
