= Edmund Elton (actor) =

English actor and singer

Edmund Elton (February 5, 1870, Preston, Lancashire – January 4, 1952, Los Angeles, California) was an English actor and singer. After beginning his career in British music halls in the late 19th century, he relocated to the United States where he had a career as a performer in plays and musicals on Broadway, vaudeville, and in both silent film and talking pictures in Hollywood during the first half of the 20th century.

== Career ==
In America, Edmund Elton first drew attention as an actor portraying Percy Vere in the United States national tour of Charles H. Hoyt's A Black Sheep in 1899-1900. In the 1900-1901 season he toured the United States again as Brother Paul in a production of Hall Caine's The Christian. In 1901 he settled in Philadelphia where he was committed to performing as a resident player with two different theatre companies over the next four years, the Girard Avenue Stock and the Forepaugh Company. He then joined Eugenie Blair's theatre company with whom he starred as Torvald Helmer in Henrik Ibsen's A Doll's House in 1906 with Blair as Nora. His other roles with Blair's company included Bill Sikes in Oliver Twist and Archibald Carlyle in East Lynne. In the summers of 1906, 1907, and 1908 he toured New England in performances with the Hunter-Bradford Stock Company.

Elton made his Broadway debut as the villain Struve in the 1907 play adaptation of Rex Beach's 1906 novel The Spoilers at the New York Theatre. He created roles in several more original plays on Broadway, including Henry P. Schofield in Edward Everett Rose's Penrod (1918), Bill Avery in Paul Armstrong's Alias Jimmy Valentine (1921), Hendricks in John Willard's The Cat and the Canary (1922), Frederic J. Norton in Pierre Gendron's Kept (1926), J. Cheever West in Willis Maxwell Goodhue's Betty, Be Careful (1931), Barker in Ernst Toller's Bloody Laughter (1931), and Mr. Bullock in Herbert Polesie and John McGowan's Heigh-Ho, Everybody (1932). He also portrayed Rufio in the 1925 Broadway revival of George Bernard Shaw's Caesar and Cleopatra; a production which marked the grand opening of the Guild Theatre. Original Broadway musicals he starred in included the roles of Jim Hayward in Albert Von Tilzer's Honey Girl (1920), General Birabeau in Sigmund Romberg's The Desert Song (1926) and "Pop" O'Keefe in Ray Henderson's Hold Everything!.

In 1916, Elton starred as Capulet in the Metro Pictures silent film Romeo and Juliet. He portrayed Robert Darzac in the Mayflower Photoplay Company's The Mystery of the Yellow Room (1919). His other film roles included The Mayor in How've You Bean (1933), Mr. "Pop" Martin in Stella Dallas (1937), Mr. Rutledge in Abe Lincoln in Illinois (1939), Dr. Turner in Should a Girl Marry? (1939), Judge Bent in Back in the Saddle (1941), and the elderly man in Here Comes Mr. Jordan (1941) among others.

Elton died in Los Angeles, California on January 4, 1952.
