= Many Waters (play) =

Play by Monckton Hoffe

- Written by: Monckton Hoffe
- Original language: English
- Genre: Romance drama

Premiere
- Date premiered: 19 July 1928
- Place premiered: Ambassadors Theatre, London

Many Waters is a play by the Irish writer Monckton Hoffe. It was first performed in 1926 under the title The Unnamed Play lasting for one performance at the Stand Theatre in London. Revised and under its new title it enjoyed a much longer West End run at the Ambassadors Theatre, lasting for 313 performances between 18 July 1928 and 20 April 1929. The 1928 cast included Nicholas Hannen, Marda Vanne, Milton Rosmer, Reginald Denham, Aubrey Dexter and Robert Douglas in his West End debut. The title is from the expression "Many waters cannot quench love" (Song of Solomon 8:7).

== Film version ==
In 1931 it was made into a British film of the same title directed by Milton Rosmer and starring Lillian Hall-Davis, Arthur Margetson and Elizabeth Allan. Both director Rosmer and actor Douglas had appeared on stage in the show, with the latter reprising his role for the screen version.

== Bibliography ==
- Goble, Alan. The Complete Index to Literary Sources in Film. Walter de Gruyter, 1999.
- Wearing, J.P. The London Stage 1920-1929: A Calendar of Productions, Performers, and Personnel. Rowman & Littlefield, 2014.
