= The Little Damozel (1933 film) =

- Contemporary advertisement
- Directed by: Herbert Wilcox
- Written by: Donovan Pedelty
- Based on: The Little Damozel by Monckton Hoffe
- Produced by: Herbert Wilcox
- Starring: Anna Neagle; James Rennie
- Cinematography: Freddie Young
- Edited by: Cecil H. Williamson
- Music by: Noël Coward; Ray Noble; Lew Stone (musical director)
- Production company: British & Dominions Film Corporation
- Distributed by: Woolf & Freedman Film Service (UK)
- Release date: 3 February 1933 (London)
- Running time: 73 minutes
- Country: United Kingdom
- Language: English

The Little Damozel (also known as Little Damoiselle) is a 1933 British romance film directed by Herbert Wilcox and starring Anna Neagle, James Rennie and Benita Hume. It was written by Donovan Pedelty based on the 1908 play by Monckton Hoffe, previously filmed in 1916. Dresses for the film were designed by Doris Zinkeisen.

== Plot ==
Gambler Recky Poole accepts a bet to marry Julie Alardy, a night club danseuse. After the wedding, Recky unexpectedly falls in love with her, but Julia decides to divorce him and go back to dancing. A despairing Recky contemplates suicide, contriving to make it look like an accident so that Julia will be able to collect the insurance. Luckily, she returns to him before it is too late, and they live a life of wedded bliss.

== Cast ==
- Anna Neagle as Julie Alardy
- James Rennie as Recky Poole
- Benita Hume as Sybil Craven
- Athole Stewart as Captain Partington
- Alfred Drayton as Walter Angel
- Clifford Heatherley as Papa Bertholdy
- Peter Northcote as Abraham
- Franklyn Bellamy as Franz
- Aubrey Fitzgerald as Fritz

== Reception ==
Film Weekly wrote: "Miss Neagle reveals a very pleasant singing voice and puts over 'What more can I ask?', the heavily plugged but excellent theme number, very well. Her acting is rather unsteady but always interesting except when (as happens several times) scenes are played out to such lengths and with so little dramatic purpose but they inevitably lag."

The Daily Film Renter wrote: "Plot offers entertaining blend of romance, marital misunderstanding, husbandly altruism and a happy ending. Anna Neagle does well as outwardly tough heroine, singing tuneful songs and dancing attractively, while James Rennie makes sympathetic male lead."

Kine Weekly wrote: "Anna Neagle is hardly versatile enough for the role of Julie, but her attractive personality helps to cloak her histrionic limitation. James Rennie does not quite suggest the English gentleman as Recky. Lut Athole Stewart, Alfred Drayton and Benita Hume bring strength to the cast in supporting roles."

The West Australian wrote: "[[Miss Neagle]] gives a really splendid performance, and the opening of the film ... gives her the opportunity to sing some delightful numbers."
