= The Lash (1930 film) =

1930 film

- Directed by: Frank Lloyd
- Written by: Bradley King; Lanier Bartlett; Virginia Stivers Bartlett
- Produced by: Frank Lloyd
- Starring: Richard Barthelmess; Mary Astor; James Rennie; Marian Nixon
- Cinematography: Ernest Haller
- Edited by: Harold Young
- Music by: Xavier Cugat; David Mendoza; Leon Rosebrook
- Production company: First National Pictures
- Distributed by: Warner Bros. Pictures
- Release date: December 14, 1930
- Running time: 77 minutes
- Country: United States
- Language: English
- Budget: $647,000
- Box office: $716,000

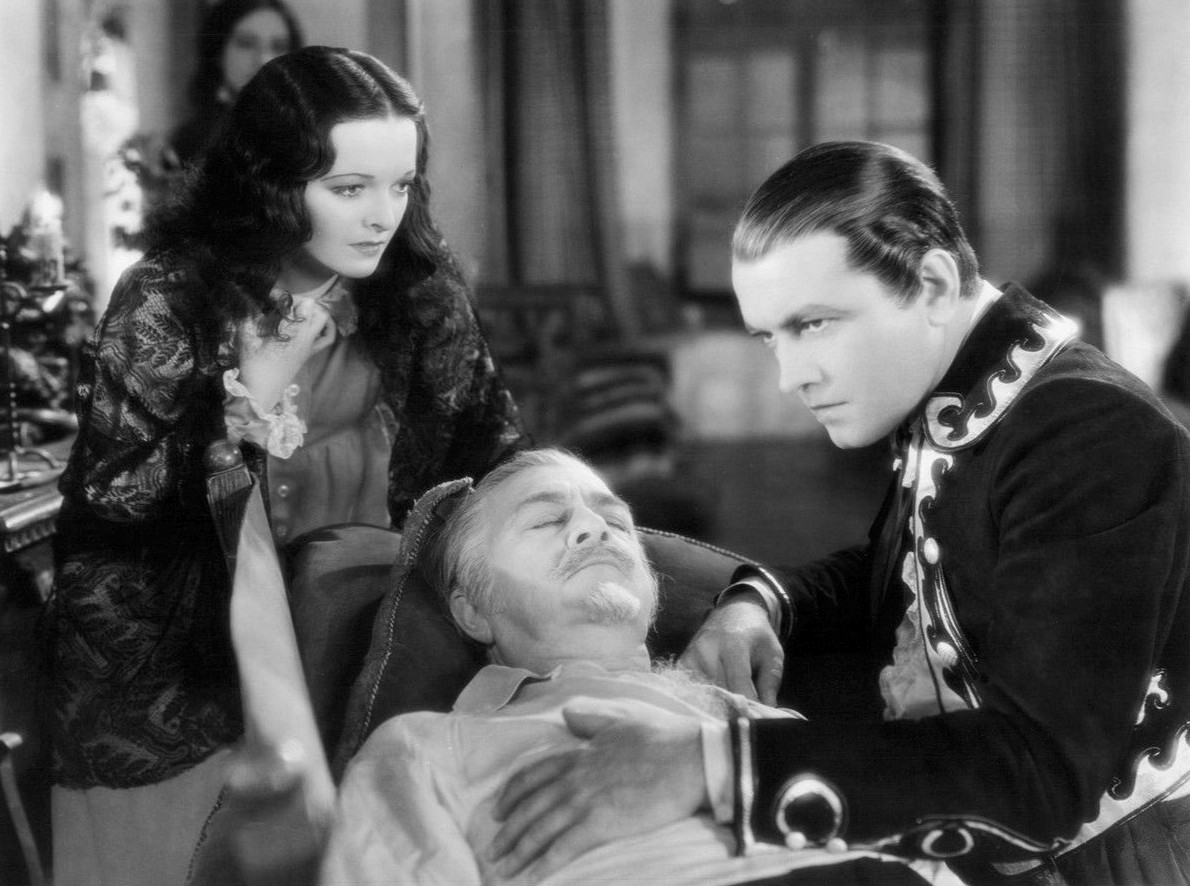
Marian Nixon, Robert Edeson, and Richard Barthelmess in The Lash.

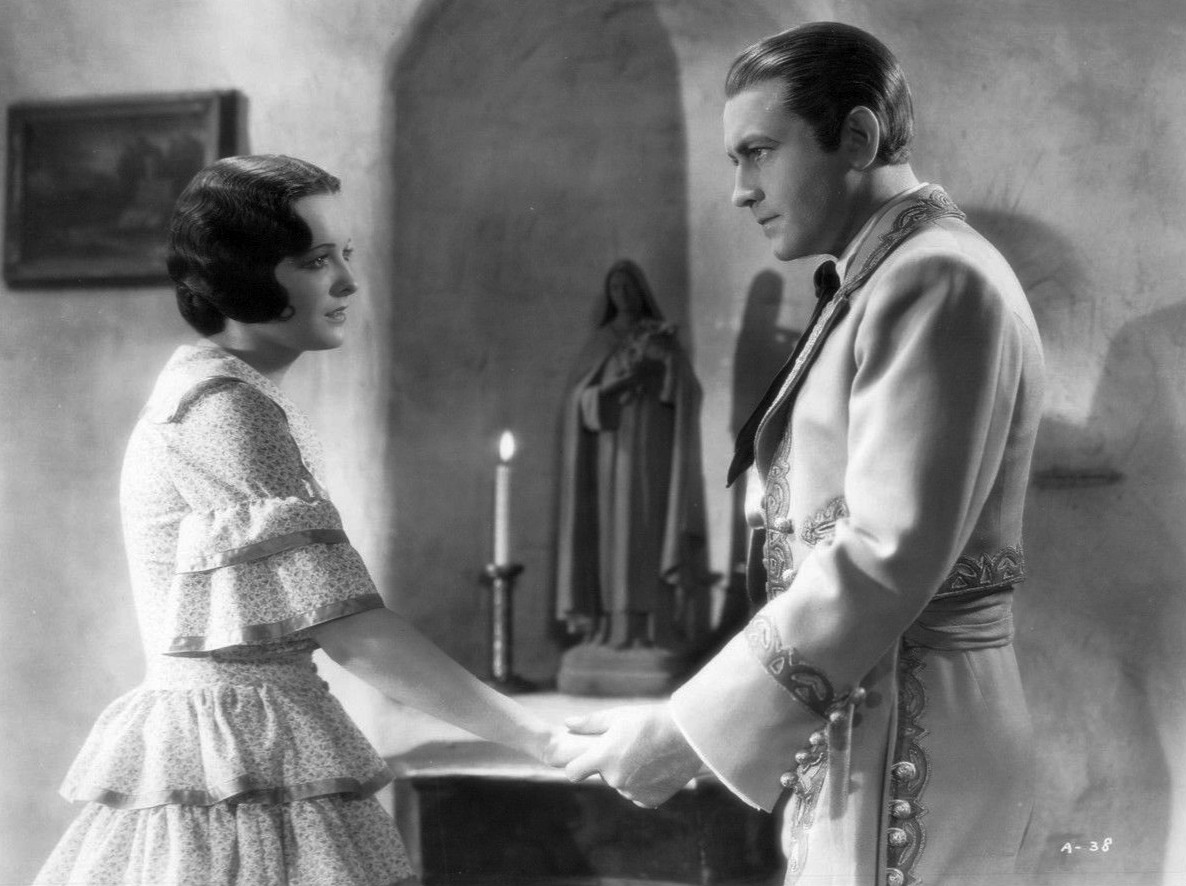
Marian Nixon and Richard Barthelmess in The Lash.

The Lash is a 1930 American pre-Code Western film produced and distributed by First National Pictures, a subsidiary of Warner Bros. It had an alternate title of Adios. The film was directed by Frank Lloyd and stars Richard Barthelmess, Mary Astor, James Rennie and Marian Nixon. The film was issued in two formats: Warner Bros. 65mm Vitascope wide screen and regular 35mm. The Vitaphone sound system was used for recording. Exteriors were filmed at the current Westlake Village, California and Russell Ranch of Thousand Oaks, California areas near Los Angeles. It was adapted for the screen by Bradley King from a story Adios by Fred Bartlett and Virginia Stivers Bartlett.

== Plot ==
When Francisco Delfino goes off to study for four years at a university in Mexico, his home in California is a part of Mexico. By the time he returns (around 1850), however, California in the hands of the United States. He finds his family living in fear and the family estate is in shambles. Although the land deeds granted by the Spanish throne are supposed to be recognized by the U.S. government as proof of ownership, some unscrupulous California land commissioners are attempting to cheat the landowners.

Delfino becomes embroiled in an argument with a Federal official, Peter Harkness. When Delfino shows an interest in Rosita, a girl that Harkness regards as his girlfriend, Delfino is tied up and lashed across the face. He is only saved from further assault by the sheriff, David Howard.

Delfino embarks on a career of Robin Hood-style banditry to avenge the brutal treatment of the Spanish and Mexican settlers, and there is soon a price on his head. Now close friends with Delfino, Howard has fallen in love with his sister, Dolores. When their father is shot, Delfino avenges his murder. He delivers the deed to his family's property to Howard, who allows him time to escape to Mexico — where Rosita promises to meet him.

== Cast ==
- Richard Barthelmess as Francisco Delfino
- Mary Astor as Doña Rosita Garcia
- Fred Kohler as Peter Harkness
- Marian Nixon as Doña Dolores Delfino
- James Rennie as David Howard
- Robert Edeson as Don Delfino
- Erville Alderson as Judge Travers
- Barbara Bedford as Lupe
- Arthur Stone as Juan
- William L. Thorne as Bella Union cantina landlord
- Mathilde Comont as Concha (uncredited)
- Xavier Cugat as orchestra leader (uncredited)
- Frank Lackteen as caballero (uncredited)
- Francis McDonald as caballero (uncredited)

== Box Office ==
According to Warner Bros records the film earned $565,000 domestically and $151,000 foreign.
