= The Prisoner of Zenda (1952 film) =

1952 film by Richard Thorpe

- Theatrical release poster
- Directed by: Richard Thorpe
- Written by: Wells Root; Donald Ogden Stewart
- Screenplay by: Noel Langley; John L. Balderston
- Based on: The Prisoner of Zenda 1894 novel by Edward E. Rice Anthony Hope; The Prisoner of Zenda 1896 play by Edward E. Rose
- Produced by: Pandro S. Berman
- Starring: Stewart Granger; Deborah Kerr; Louis Calhern; Jane Greer; Lewis Stone; Robert Douglas; James Mason
- Cinematography: Joseph Ruttenberg
- Edited by: George Boemler
- Music by: Alfred Newman
- Production company: Metro-Goldwyn-Mayer
- Distributed by: Loew's Inc.
- Release date: November 4, 1952
- Running time: 96 minutes
- Country: United States
- Language: English
- Budget: $1.7 million
- Box office: $5.6 million

The Prisoner of Zenda is a 1952 American Technicolor adventure film version of the 1894 novel of the same name by Anthony Hope and a remake of the 1937 sound version and the 1922 silent. This first color version, made by Loew's and Metro-Goldwyn-Mayer, was directed by Richard Thorpe and produced by Pandro S. Berman. The film stars Stewart Granger, Deborah Kerr, and James Mason, with Louis Calhern, Robert Douglas, Jane Greer, and Robert Coote in supporting roles.

The screenplay, attributed to Noel Langley, was nearly word-for-word identical to the 1937 Ronald Colman version. It was written by John L. Balderston, adapted by Wells Root, from the Hope novel and the stage play by Edward Rose. Additional dialogue was written by Donald Ogden Stewart. Alfred Newman's 1937 music score was adapted by Conrad Salinger; Newman was unavailable to work on this version. The cinematography was by Joseph Ruttenberg, the art direction was by Cedric Gibbons and Hans Peters, while the costume design was by Walter Plunkett.

The Prisoner of Zenda was released to cinemas on November 4, 1952.

== Plot ==
In June 1897, English gentleman Rudolf Rassendyll takes a fishing vacation in Ruritania, a small kingdom in the Balkans. While there, he is puzzled by the odd reactions of the natives to him. Rassendyll discovers why when he meets Colonel Zapt and Captain Fritz von Tarlenheim. Zapt introduces him to the soon-to-be-crowned king, Rudolf V, who turns out to be not only his distant relative, but also looks just like him (except for the Englishman's mustache). The king, surprised at first, takes a great liking to the Englishman, and invites him to stay at the royal hunting lodge.

They celebrate their acquaintance by drinking late into the night. King Rudolf is particularly delighted with a bottle of wine given to him by his scheming half-brother, Duke Michael, so he drinks it all himself, and he soon passes out. The next morning brings a disastrous discovery: the wine was drugged. Rudolf cannot be awakened, and if he cannot attend his coronation that day, Michael will try to assume royal authority as Regent. It is revealed that Michael is bitter that, because his mother was not of royal blood, the younger Rudolf is the king. Zapt is able to convince a reluctant Rassendyll to impersonate Rudolf for the ceremony.

Rassendyll meets Rudolf's betrothed, Princess Flavia. She had always disliked her cousin Rudolf, but now finds him greatly changed, very much for the better. As they spend time together, they begin to fall in love.

With the coronation accomplished, Rassendyll returns to resume his real identity, only to find the king has been kidnapped by Rupert of Hentzau, Michael's charmingly amoral henchman. Rassendyll is forced to continue the impersonation while Zapt searches for Rudolf. Michael cannot denounce the masquerade without incriminating himself.

Help comes from an unexpected quarter. To be king, Michael must marry his cousin Flavia. Rupert sets a trap for Rassendyll and arrives with two other men to kill him. But before Rupert arrives, Antoinette de Mauban, Michael's jealous French mistress, slips in and reveals to Rassendyll that (1) it is a trap to kill him, and (2) the king is being held in Michael's castle near Zenda. She promises to help rescue him. Since Rudolf would be executed at the first sign of a rescue attempt, she proposes that one man swim the moat and hold off his would-be assassins, while loyal troops storm the castle. With the help of Antoinette and Captain Fritz von Tarlenheim, Rassendyll escapes.

After meeting with Rupert, who offers him 100,000 pounds to leave (and have Fritz and Col Zapt killed), Rassendyll plans a rescue with Fritz and Zapt. He decides that he is the man to swim the moat, over Zapt's strenuous objections.

Their carefully laid plans go awry when Michael finds Rupert trying to seduce his mistress. After Rupert kills him, a heartbroken Antoinette blurts out just enough to alert Rupert to danger. Rassendyll fights and kills the guards, but must engage in a prolonged duel with Rupert while at the same time trying to lower the drawbridge to let Zapt and his men inside. When he finally succeeds, Rupert flees.

King Rudolf resumes his royal powers and duties. Rassendyll tries to persuade Flavia to leave with him, but her devotion to duty is too great and their parting, while loving, is bittersweet.

In the final scene, Zapt and von Tarlenheim escort Rassendyll to the border, where Fritz tells him, "Fate doesn't always make the right man King," and Colonel Zapt salutes him, saying, "You're the noblest Elphburg of them all," as Rassendyll rides across the border.

== Cast ==
- Stewart Granger as Rudolf Rassendyll/King Rudolf V
- Deborah Kerr as Princess Flavia. Jean Simmons, who was married to Granger at the time, and Eleanor Parker were considered for the role.
- James Mason as Rupert of Hentzau. Richard Greene was to have portrayed Rupert, but had a scheduling conflict.
- Louis Calhern as Colonel Zapt
- Robert Coote as Fritz von Tarlenheim
- Robert Douglas as Michael, Duke of Strelsau
- Jane Greer as Antoinette de Mauban
- Lewis Stone as the Cardinal. Stone played the dual lead role in the 1922 silent version.
- John Goldsworthy as the Archbishop
- Gordon Richards as the Dignitary (uncredited)

== Background and production notes ==
In May 1951 MGM announced they had bought the rights to remake the 1937 film from David O. Selznick as a vehicle for Stewart Granger. (Granger had just enjoyed enormous success in another remake for MGM, King Solomon's Mines.) Pandro S Berman would produce. MGM was remaking a large number of old movies in color around this time, such as Showboat.

According to a Hollywood Reporter news item, MGM was to pay Selznick $225,000 for the remake rights to the novel and the play by Edward Rose.

This version of The Prisoner of Zenda used the same shooting script as the 1937 David O. Selznick film. Slight variations in the screenplay were added by Noel Langley. In addition to the dialogue, the same film score, composed by Alfred Newman for the 1937 version, was also used for this version. A comparison of the two films reveals that settings and camera angles, in most cases, are the same.

In 1999, blacklisted writer Donald Ogden Stewart, who was credited with additional dialogue on the 1937 production, was given a restored credit for the 1952 film.

The cast included Lewis Stone, who starred in the 1922 film version of the novel in the dual role played by Granger in this picture. Stone had also played the part on stage in 1907. On June 1, 1952, in a piece headlined “Lewis Stone: Perpetual Prisoner of Zenda”, John H. Rothwell reported to The New York Times from the set of the film, then under production. In the interview, Stone reminisces about the making of the 1922 film. A potentially devastating oversight meant that two days before shooting, his costumes had not been made. The desperate director, Rex Ingram, came to Lewis hoping he had saved something from the theatrical production. Fortunately, Stone had the entire wardrobe in his attic.

== Reception ==
According to MGM records the film earned $2,078,000 in North America and $3,550,000 elsewhere, making an overall profit of $1,759,000.

The film was a hit in France, with admissions of 2,415,938.

Bosley Crowther reviewed the picture for The New York Times on November 5, 1952:

“…There seems to be no termination to the longevity of… (t)his original Ruritanian romance, which was published first in 1894 and has already had three expensive and historic productions in films…(T)his time in Technicolor, with Stewart Granger as its brave, swashbuckling star, it looks quite as youthful and unblushing as if it bore not the slightest trace of age. As a matter of fact, the illusion of the recklessness of hot, romantic youth is by far the most concrete satisfaction that this fabulous period film achieves… (I)ts pretense of ideal love relinquished is pretty quaint in this realistic day. But the deathless potential of this idyll is in the glowing opportunities it provides for sweeping pictorial action in a regal heroic style. And it is this untarnished potential that has been seized upon by M-G-M, … The romance is overpowered by action, the sentiment by play with the sword… And Mr. Granger (or his athletic double in the more demanding scenes) is obviously the fellow who can master the verisimilitude. He has the build of an athlete, a chest that can proudly be exposed and the face of a dauntless Adonis who gallantly leaps to muscular deeds… His climactic battle with James Mason, who is sheer Machiavelli in the role of the treacherous Rupert of Hentzau, is the dandiest excitement in the film… Deborah Kerr is winsome and warm …Louis Calhern is lordly and formidable…, and Robert Douglas is grim and malignant... But it is Mr. Granger as the two Rudolfs, the gallant gentleman and the feeble, sodden heir, who combines with Mr. Mason in making this Prisoner of Zenda spin. Theirs is the sort of play-acting that defies the solemnities of time, the smirks of sophistication and the rigidities of age.”

On November 9, 1952, Crowther wrote a piece for The New York Times headlined “Captive Story: Prisoner of Zenda and A Long Film Career.” that segues from the history of the story to his observations of what this picture bodes for the future in the then-current cycle of remakes: “A hopeful but ironic trend”.
