= Camille (1926 short film) =

1926 film

Camille: The Fate of a Coquette
- Directed by: Ralph Barton
- Based on: La Dame aux Camélias; 1848 novel by Alexandre Dumas, fils
- Produced by: Ralph Barton
- Starring: Paul Robeson; Sinclair Lewis; Anita Loos
- Release date: 1926
- Running time: 33 mins (DVD)
- Country: United States
- Language: Silent

Camille: The Fate of a Coquette is a 1926 short film by Ralph Barton. Its development is described in Bruce Kellner's biography of Barton, The Last Dandy (1991).

This 33-minute silent film was compiled from Barton's home movies and is loosely based on the French novel, La Dame aux Camélias (1848), by Alexandre Dumas, fils. The homemade film is a mish mash of dos and don'ts i.e. a group of people presumably drinking real alcohol from liquor bottles during prohibition. The appearance of a toilet in a bathroom scene had almost never been done in American silent films of the time, with the exception of The Crowd (1928).

Appearances are made by Charlie Chaplin, Paul Robeson, Anita Loos, H. L. Mencken, Theodore Dreiser, Sinclair Lewis, Paul Claudel, and many other celebrities and public figures of 1920s Paris, France and New York City, U.S.

== Plot summary ==
There is not a straightforward plot. This film was designed to look like a home movie collage heavy on satire. The basic premise is Camille becomes a courtesan and she befalls many chaotic minor tragedies. The main goal of the film was to have cameos from 1920's literary figures, artists and celebrities in the absurd vignettes containing inside jokes.

== Cast ==
- Paul Robeson - Alexandre Dumas fils
- Sinclair Lewis - Allegorical figures
- Anita Loos - Camille
- George Jean Nathan - Arthur
- Donald Freeman - Gustave
- Pauline Starke - Nan
- Theodore Dreiser - Gas-House Gleasen
- Sherwood Anderson - Mr. X
- Clarence Darrow - August Peters
- Lois Moran - Alice Brown
- Édouard Bourdet - The Earl of Idaho
- Jacques Copeau- Radavanni
- Georges Lepape - The Weasel
- Denise Bourdet - Olga Petroff
- Bernard Boulet de Monvel - Dou-Dou-Dou
- Sacha Guitry - Mancha y Zaragosa
- Yvonne Printemps - Angèle Hemingway
- Alfred A. Knopf Sr. - Abd-el-Hammam
- Serge Koussevitzky - Grand Duke Michael
- Wally Toscanini - Madge
- H.L. Mencken - Andrew Volstead
- Joseph Hergesheimer - Spirit of Valentino
- Aileen Pringle - Estelle
- Marie-Blanche de Polignac - Les Pâcheux
- Julia Hoyt - Kitty
- Charles Chaplin - Mike
- Ethel Barrymore- Olympe
- John Emerson - Count de Varville
- Sem - Archbishop of Canterbury
- Paul Morand - Lars Nelson
- Patsy Ruth Miller - Sadie
- Morris Gest - Butter-and-Egg Man
- Lili Darvas - Queenie
- Rex Ingram - Charles Stewart Parnell
- Paul Claudel - Jean Bart
- W. Somerset Maugham - Monsieur Duval
- Roland Young - Lord Kyne
- Sultan of Morocco - Sultan of Morocco
- Frank Keenan - Prince von Lindenstein
- Ferenc Molnár - Drnskaqrsk
- Max Reinhardt - Siegfried
- Charles G. Shaw - Armand Duval
- T.R. Smith - Doctor
- Zéna Naylor - Nurse
- Mary Hutchins - Nanine
- Richard Barthelmess - Gaston
- Chauncey Olcott - Pierre
- Nikita Balieff - Ivon
- Dorothy Gish - Grace
- James Rennie - Philippe
- Carmel Myers - Agatha
- Mrs. Thomas Ward - The Virgin Mary
