= Escape (play) =

1926 play by John Galsworthy

- Original language: English
- Written by: John Galsworthy
- Genre: Drama
- Setting: Hyde Park, London and Dartmoor

Premiere
- Date: 12 August 1926 (UK); 26 October 1927 (US)
- Place: Ambassadors Theatre London (UK); Booth Theatre; New York City (US)

Escape is a play in nine episodes by the British writer John Galsworthy. The world premiere was on August 12, 1926 at the Ambassadors Theatre in London's West End, produced by Leon M. Lion. The play ran until March of the following year, when it went on tour of England with Gerald Ames in the lead role.

Subsequently, the play transferred to Broadway where it was produced and staged by Winthrop Ames (no relation of Gerald Ames). The American production ran for 173 performances from 26 October 1927 to March 1928 at the Booth Theatre, New York City. It was included in Burns Mantle's The Best Plays of 1927–1928.

The play was made into a film in 1930.

== Plot ==
Former World War I British Army Captain Matt Denant protects a poor prostitute from an over-persistent plainclothes police detective. In a scuffle Denant hits the officer who as a result falls, striking his head, and dies. Denant gets sentenced to Dartmoor Prison for manslaughter and escapes from a work detail. The plot is a series of episodes where Denant meets people who will either abet or obstruct his escape thus becoming a study in class structure and ethos according to Galsworthy's interpretation of 1920s British society.

== Cast of UK premiere in order of appearance ==
- Nicholas Hannen as Captain Matt Denant
- Ursula Jeans as girl of the town
- Charles Koop as plainclothes man and the Dartmoor constable
- Harold Lester as the policeman
- Cyril Hardingham as the other policeman and the labourer
- Leon M. Lion as the fellow convict, old gentleman
- Gerard Clifton as the warder, the captain
- Stafford Hilliard as the other warder, the man in plus fours and the bellringer
- Molly Kerr as the shingled lady
- Phyllis Konstam as the maid and the wife of man in plus fours
- Paul Gill as the shopkeeper and the farmer
- Ethel Manning as wife of the shopkeeper
- Ann Codrington as sister of the shopkeeper and Miss Grace
- Betty Astell as the little girl
- Margaret Halstan as Miss Dora
- Austin Trevor as the parson (also in NYC cast)

== Cast of US premiere in order of appearance ==
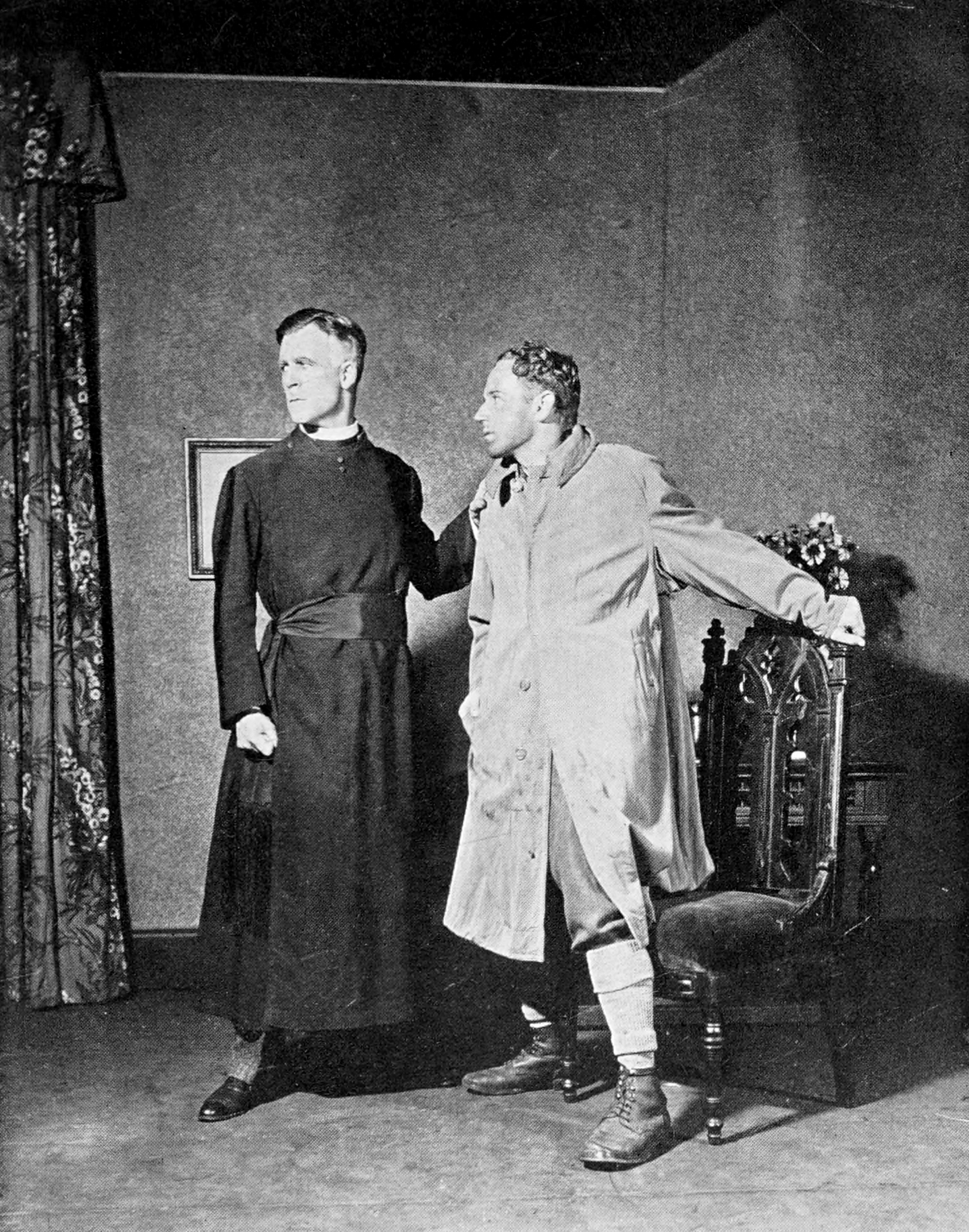
Austin Trevor and Leslie Howard in the Broadway production of Escape (1927)

- Leslie Howard as Captain Matt Denant
- Henrietta Goodwin as girl of the town
- Edgar B. Kent as plainclothes man, the other warder and the Dartmoor constable
- A. B. I. Imeson, the policeman and the warder
- F. Cecil Butler as the other policeman and the other laborer
- St. Clair Bayfield as the captain and the laborer
- Laurence Hanray as the fellow convict, the old gentleman and the farmer
- Frieda Inescort as the shingled lady
- Geraldine Kay as little girl
- Lois Heatherley as Miss Grace
- Renee Macredy as Miss Dora
- Cyrena Smith as the maid
- Alan Trotter as the man in Plus fours and the bellringer
- Viva Tattersall as wife of man in Plus fours
- J. P. Wilson as shopkeeper
- Lily Kerr as wife of shopkeeper
- Ruth Vivian as sister of shopkeeper
- Austin Trevor as the parson (also in UK cast)

== Adaptations ==
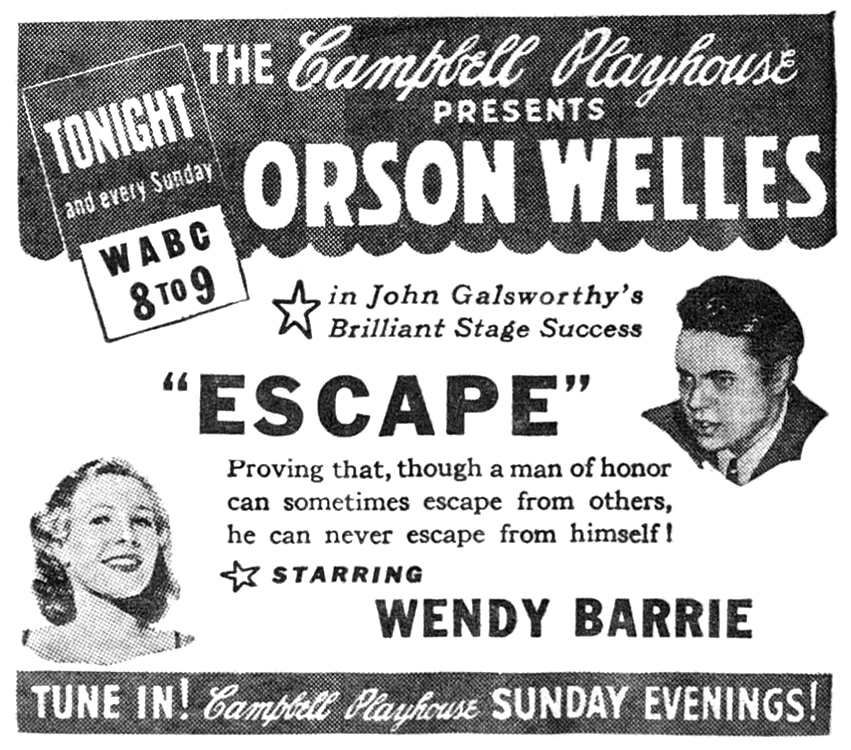
Newspaper advertisement for The Campbell Playhouse presentation of "Escape" (October 15, 1939)

Escape was adapted for the 1930 film Escape, and remade in 1948.

A radio adaptation of play was broadcast in two parts August 15 and August 22, 1937, on the Columbia Workshop. Orson Welles starred as Captain Matt Denant.

The play was adapted for the October 15, 1939, episode of the CBS Radio series The Campbell Playhouse. The cast included Orson Welles (Matt Denant), Wendy Barrie (Lady in the hotel), Ray Collins (Murdered cop, Forgiving Judge, Unforgiving Farmer), Jack Smart (another Cop, Farmhand), Edgar Barrier (Priest and Cabbie), Bea Benaderet (Girl in park, Woman at picnic), Harriet Kay (Maid), Mabel Albertson (Bessie) and Benny Rubin (Man at picnic).
