= Audrey Lucas =

English actress (1898–1975)

Liverpool Daily Post, 1935

Audrey Lucas (17 March 1898 – 1975) was an actress and writer of plays, novels and adaptations of novels for radio.

== Early life ==
Audrey Lucas was born in London, the only child of the acclaimed writer E.V. Lucas who had married Florence Elizabeth Gertrude Griffin in April 1897. Audrey was born into a literary household as her father's close friends included the writers J.M. Barrie and A.A. Milne.

== Career ==
Lucas made her stage debut in London in 1924 playing the part of Tootles in a production of Peter Pan by A.A. Milne at the Adelphi Theatre in London. She repeated the role in productions at the Shaftesbury Theatre in 1926 and in 1927. She also played in provincial repertory theatre.

Audrey Lucas's first play, The Peaceful Thief was performed in November 1927 at the Arts Club Theatre. The play was produced by the 23-year-old actor, Molly Kerr who also appeared in the production, and the part of Martin Grey was played by Harold Scott.

In May 1929 Lucas's second play Why drag in marriage, produced by Harold Scott, was performed at the Strand Theatre.

In 1935 Lucas co-wrote a play Apart from all that with D.A. Clarke-Smith.

Audrey Lucas published four novels in four years under her birth name: Double Turn (1935), Friendly Relations (1936), Life Class (1937) and Old Motley (1938), all issued by Collins. In 1939 she published a literary portrait of her father, E.V. Lucas.

During World War II Lucas worked for the BBC adapting well-known books for broadcast on the Home Service of the radio including Vanity Fair by William Makepeace Thackeray, which was also broadcast on the BBC World Service, and several of Charles Dickens’ novels including Oliver Twist and Nicholas Nickleby. She was the adaptor of The Man With No Face by Dorothy L. Sayers, broadcast on 3 April 1943 as the very first episode of the long-running BBC drama strand Saturday Night Theatre, a choice "which set the tone for a generation".

After World War II Lucas reviewed books for The Tatler and in 1952 revised her father's book A Wanderer in Paris (1909) for the publisher Methuen.

== Personal life ==
In July 1927 Audrey Lucas changed her name by deed poll to Audrey Lucas Scott and, a few months later, gave birth to a daughter named Lavinia. In London in July 1928 Audrey married the actor Harold Ernest Scott (1891–1964), with whom she had been working.

In early 1930 Lucas began a relationship with the novelist Evelyn Waugh whom she had first met in 1924. Their relationship is described in Waugh's diaries and effectively ended when he travelled to Africa for six months in October 1930 to obtain material for a travel book. It has been proposed that Audrey was the model for the character Angela Lyne, who has the same initials, in Waugh's third novel, Black Mischief (1932).

In the late 1930s Lucas married Douglas Alexander Clarke-Smith. They divorced in the early 1940s because, in July 1945, Clarke-Smith married again.

Audrey Lucas is reported to have died in 1975.
