= The Little Damozel (play) =

The Little Damozel is a 1909 play by the Irish writer Monckton Hoffe. A naval captain pays one of his crew to marry a woman. Stage actors Henry Vogel and May Buckley were cast members in the 1910 Broadway production.

== Adaptations ==
It was adapted twice into films. In 1916 a silent film The Little Damozel was directed by Wilfred Noy. In 1933 a sound version The Little Damozel was made by Herbert Wilcox featuring Anna Neagle.

== Bibliography ==
- Nicoll, Allardyce. English Drama, 1900-1930: The Beginnings of the Modern Period. Cambridge University Press, 1973.
