= The Little Damozel (1916 film) =

- Directed by: Wilfred Noy
- Written by: Monckton Hoffe
- Based on: the play The Little Damozel by Monckton Hoffe
- Starring: Barbara Conrad; Geoffrey Wilmer
- Production company: Clarendon
- Distributed by: Harma Photoplays
- Release date: September 1916
- Running time: 5 reels
- Country: United Kingdom
- Languages: Silent; English intertitles

The Little Damozel is a 1916 British silent drama film directed by Wilfred Noy. A sound version, also based on the play by Monckton Hoffe, appeared in 1933.

== Plot ==
In Monte Carlo, a gambler marries a singer for a bet, and eventually falls in love with her.

== Cast ==
- J. Hastings Batson as Admiral Craven
- Roy Byford as Beppo
- Norah Chaplin as Cybil Craven
- Barbara Conrad as Julie Alardy
- Richard Lindsay as Captain Parkinson
- Geoffrey Wilmer as Recklaw Poole

== Bibliography ==
- Low, Rachael. History of the British Film, 1914-1918. Routledge, 2005.
