= The Faithful Heart (play) =

The Faithful Heart is a 1921 play by the Irish writer Monckton Hoffe.

== Structure ==
A play in a prologue (set in 1899), two acts (twenty years later) and an epilogue.

The prologue is set in the Reindeer Hotel, outside Southampton docks. Act one is set in "the private office of Colonel Ango in a hotel converted by the war department". Act two is set in "Colonel Ango's flat in Mount Street, London". The epilogue is again set in the Reindeer Hotel at Southampton.

== Adaptations ==
The play has been adapted on three occasions. In 1922 it was made into a silent film The Faithful Heart starring Lillian Hall-Davis. In 1933 a sound version The Faithful Heart was made. The play was adapted for television in 1950 by the BBC for an episode of the Sunday Night Theatre featuring Richard Littledale and Ballard Berkeley.

== Bibliography ==
- Nicoll, Alardyce. English Drama, 1900-1930: The Beginnings of the Modern Period. Cambridge University Press, 1973.
