= Monckton Hoffe =

Irish playwright and screenwriter (1880–1951)

Reaney Monckton Hoffe-Miles
- Born: 1880; Connemara, Ireland
- Died: November 4, 1951; London, England
- Occupations: Playwright and screenwriter
- Spouse: Barbara Conrad
- Writing career
- Years active: 1903—1941
- Genre: Romantic comedy

Monckton Hoffe (1880–1951) was an Irish playwright and screenwriter.

== Early life ==
On 26 December 1880, Hoffe was born in Connemara, Ireland. His full name was Reaney Monckton Hoffe-Miles.

== Career ==
Hoffe was known for his romantic comedies and was well known in commercial theatre in London in the 1920s. He wrote more than 20 plays.

He was initially an actor who wrote his first play, The Lady Who Dwelt in the Dark, in 1903. He became more widely known with The Little Damozel in 1909 in which Charles Hawtrey appeared. He wrote for films and broadcasting, and continued to act on stage and in films intermittently throughout his life.

Hoffe was married to Barbara Conrad but the marriage was dissolved in 1923.

He died on 4 November 1951 in London.

== Selected plays ==
- The Lady Who Dwelt in the Dark (1903)
- The Little Damozel (1909)
- The Faithful Heart (1921)
- Pomp and Circumstance (1922)
- Hate Ship
- The Flame of Love
- The Crooked Friday (1925)
- Many Waters (1928)
- Grim Fairy Tale (1946)

== Selected Screenplays ==
- The Little Damozel (1916)
- The Hate Ship (1929)
- Under the Greenwood Tree (1929)
- The Flame of Love (1930)
- Hai-Tang (1930)
- Bitter Sweet (1933)
- The Queen's Affair (1934)
- What Every Woman Knows (1934)
- The Bishop Misbehaves (1935)
- Pagliacci (1936)
- The Last of Mrs. Cheyney (1937)
- London Melody (1937)
- The Lady Eve (1941)

== Honors and awards ==
Hoffe was nominated in 1941 for an Academy Award for Best Writing, Original Story for the Preston Sturges comedy The Lady Eve. The winner was Here Comes Mr. Jordan.
