= Easy Virtue =

Easy Virtue may refer to:

- Easy Virtue (play), a play by Noël Coward
- Easy Virtue (1928 film), a silent film adaptation of the play directed by Alfred Hitchcock
- Easy Virtue (2008 film), an adaptation of the play co-written and directed by Stephan Elliott
