= Easy Virtue (play) =

1924 play by Noël Coward

Larita's entrance in Act III, New York, 1925

Easy Virtue is a three-act play by Noël Coward, written in 1924 when he was 25 years old. The play depicts the conflict that arises within a conventional upper-middle-class household when the only son of the family marries a glamorous divorcée.

The play had a successful first run in New York in 1925 and then opened in London in 1926. It has been revived several times since and made into a film twice – in 1928 and 2008.

== Background ==
Easy Virtue was produced at a time when Coward was riding a wave of success. The Vortex (1924) had been a controversial sensation on both sides of the Atlantic with its portrayal of recreational drug taking and veiled references to homosexuality; his comedy Hay Fever (1925) achieved box-office success in the West End. In his autobiography, Present Indicative, Coward said that his object in writing the play was to present a comedy in the structure of a tragedy "to compare the déclassée woman of to-day with the more flamboyant demi-mondaine of the 1890s". Easy Virtue was the first of his plays to have its world premiere outside England. It was first given in the US, on 23 November 1925, at the Broad Theatre, Newark, New Jersey, before opening in New York in December 1925, where it ran for 147 performances. In 1926, after a week's pre-London try-out in Manchester, it opened at the Duke of York's Theatre in the West End, where it ran for 124 performances, from 9 June to 2 October. Both productions were directed by Basil Dean, and starred Jane Cowl as Larita, Mabel Terry-Lewis as Mrs Whittaker, and Joyce Carey as Sarah. Coward wrote that the London run ended only because Cowl had to return to America. Her performance in the lead role was more melodramatic than he thought ideal, but it was popular with audiences, and he admitted that the box-office success of the play owed much to her.

== Roles and original casts ==
	New York	London
Colonel Whittaker	Halliwell Hobbes	Marcus Barron
Mrs Whittaker	Mabel Terry-Lewis	Mabel Terry-Lewis
John, their son	Robert Harris	James Raglan
Marion, their eldest daughter	Marda Vanne	Marda Vanne
Hilda, their youngest daughter	Joan Clement Scott	Joan Clement Scott
Sarah Hurst	Joyce Carey	Joyce Carey
Charles Burleigh	Vernon Kelso	Vernon Kelso
Philip Bordon	Peter Carpenter	Deering Wells
Furber	Lionel Hogarth	Claud Graham
Mr Harris	William Podmore	Philip Wade
Nina Vansittart	Gypsy O'Brien	Adrianne Allen
The Hon Hugh Petworth	Peter Macfarlane	Peter Macfarlane
Bobby Coleman	C. Bailey Hick	Humphey Morton
Lucy Coleman	Constance Best	Diana Beaumont
The Rev Henry Furley	Wallace Wood	Wallace Wood
Mary Banfield	Marion Evenson	Anne Hylton
Mrs Hurst	Grace Hampton	Gertrude Sterroll
Mrs Phillips	Nancy B. Marsland	Edith Barker Bennett
Larita Whittaker	Jane Cowl	Jane Cowl

Sources:The Times and Mander and Mitchenson.

== Plot ==
The action of the play takes place in the hall of Colonel Whittaker's house in the country.

=== Act I ===
A drawing room with three French windows reveals a tennis court; it is early spring – but raining. Mrs Whittaker has "the stern repression of any sexual emotions; all her life has brought her to middle age with a faulty digestion which doesn't so much sour her temper as spread it." She is with her religiously zealous daughter Marion and her husband, Colonel Whittaker, "A grey haired man of about fifty – his expression is generally resigned." The Colonel and his wife have achieved some sort of "truce" – in which he lobs the occasional shot over his wife's battlement, while she is blatantly bitter about his past affairs and indiscretions.

The younger daughter, Hilda, enters ("nineteen and completely commonplace") with news that the Whittakers' only son John had married earlier while holidaying in the south of France – he and his bride Larita will arrive soon. Mrs Whittaker is thrown into despair over the news, while the Colonel is sanguine; "He had to marry someone, she's probably a very interesting woman." To which she retorts, "I've no doubt you'll find her so." Plans need to be rearranged, as John's former girlfriend and neighbour Sarah Hurst is coming to dinner with her friend Charles Burleigh.

John soon arrives with Larita, "She is tall, exquisitely made-up and very beautiful. Her clothes, because of their simplicity, are obviously violently expensive." Larita remains calm in the face of her new mother-in-law's disdain – even admitting to being divorced. John is not perturbed by his sister's shock; "He was an absolute Devil." While Larita and John freshen up before lunch, Sarah arrives with her friend Charles. Larita and Charles learn they have mutual acquaintances in France. Sarah is disappointed John has married, but welcomes Larita warmly as they all go in to lunch.

=== Act II ===
Three months later. It is now the height of summer. Larita is reading Proust's Sodom and Gomorrah on the sofa. Everyone is very concerned that she does not want to play tennis. She is bored and miserable. Her only sympathetic friend is the Colonel, who kindly plays bezique, a card game, with her. He also reveals that he speaks French. Into this scene comes Mrs Whittaker, and later Marion – preparing for a party Mrs Whittaker is throwing that evening. Much consideration is being put into the display of Japanese Lanterns. Larita and the Colonel exit. Marion and Mrs Whittaker are both shocked by Larita's choice of reading material. Marion offers to have a straight talk with Larita, but Mrs Whittaker advises against it. She feels that John will soon tire of his wife and the marriage will end in divorce.

Sarah has come to play tennis along with her brother Philip, on whom Hilda has a crush. Philip, however, is infatuated with Larita – something which Hilda misunderstands. In a fit of jealous pique, she accuses Larita of making "sheep's eyes" at Philip. John's affection for Larita seems to be waning as he bemoans his wife's shortcomings to Sarah who in return defends her new friend. Larita arrives at the end of the conversation as Sarah leaves to prepare for the evening's festivities. John attempts to talk to his wife, but his impatience and immaturity only cause them both irritation. Larita mentions her ex-husband and John's jealousy flares. A secondary argument ensues about the nature of love and trust. John resolves the argument by declaring that he "trusts Larita absolutely" and then exits to "freshen up" after tennis.

Marion chooses this moment to have her "straight talk" with Larita – the subject of which veers around the topics of Larita's friendship with the Colonel; Marion's missing fiancé Edgar; religion and hypocrisy. Marion leaves, and Philip arrives to ask Larita to reserve a dance for him – a request which is picked up on by an increasingly jealous Hilda. At afternoon tea (John is not present), Hilda delivers a newspaper cutting revealing that Larita was involved in a court case regarding a man's suicide, as well as list of many of her lovers. Larita reacts coolly, and even quips, "Only two of the people on that list really loved me."

The Colonel takes Larita's side, but Mrs Whittaker is not mollified. Larita refuses to be cowed and proceeds to rip apart everyone's moral pretensions and hypocrisy. Marion storms out of the room and Mrs Whittaker tries to send Larita to her room, telling her not to come to the party. Hilda recognizes that she has been malicious, but it is too late. Larita throws her book in frustration, accidentally (but without regret) breaking a plaster copy of the Venus de Milo in the process.

=== Act III ===
At the party, gossip about the family fight and Larita's past has spread. There is an air of titillated excitement, but Mrs Whittaker has told everyone that her daughter-in-law has a migraine, and will not be down. However, that is not the case as Larita makes a spectacular entrance wearing a striking white dress along with diamonds and rubies. John is annoyed by her outlandish costume, and will not dance with her. She dances with Philip instead. Mrs Whittaker takes this as a personal affront – as it may well have been intended.

Sarah has arrived with her friend Charles. They discuss Larita and guess at what has gone on. Larita has a moment with Charles, and explains why she married John: "I thought that any other relationship would be cheapening and squalid – I can't imagine how I could have been such a fool." She also tells Sarah privately that she is leaving – and apologizes for having interrupted her relationship with John. She hopes that Sarah will forgive her, and take John back.

John, blissfully unaware of the fight in the afternoon or the reasons for the divorce, asks his wife to dance with him. She tells him to dance with Sarah – and when he does – she quietly leaves. The only person to see her off is Furber, the family butler.

== Subsequent productions ==
In 1988 the play was revived at the small King's Head Theatre in Islington, London, featuring Jane How as Larita with Ronnie Stevens and Avril Angers as Colonel and Mrs Whittaker. The production transferred to the Garrick Theatre in the West End, with Zena Walker taking over the role of Mrs Whittaker; the play ran there from 13 April throughout the rest of 1988.

In a 1999 revival at the Chichester Festival Theatre, Greta Scacchi played Larita, with Michael Jayston and Wendy Craig as Colonel and Mrs Whittaker. In the same year a production at the Shaw Festival starred Goldie Semple as Larita and Patricia Hamilton as Mrs Whittaker.

== Critical reception ==
The notices for the original production were generally polite but unenthusiastic. George Jean Nathan thought it old-fashioned, in the Pinero manner, and called it an "ancient whangdoodle". James Agate wrote, "Mr Noel Coward gets younger with every play", adding that the playwright took an over-romanticised schoolboyish view of his heroine who is, in Agate's view, "a bore to herself and a nuisance to everyone else". The anonymous reviewer in The Times found the play "smooth in manner, quick in detailed observation, easy in speech", but the setting and plot "manufactured" and not wholly convincing. The critic in The Illustrated London News also found the situation and plot "rather weak" but added, "Strokes of character, scenes of pure comedy, ingenious effects of the theatre disarm the severest critic".

Reviewing the 1988 revival, Michael Coveney called the play "a fascinating blend of the country house ill-manners of [Hay Fever] and the late Victorian problem drama". In The Times, Jeremy Kingston judged Larita to be "one of the first human women Coward created"; he thought the most likely reason for the neglect of the piece was its unusually large cast.

== Adaptations ==
=== Film ===
The 1928 film version was directed by Alfred Hitchcock. It is a silent film, and the only remaining piece of dialogue from the play is a card on which Mrs Whittaker says: "Have you had as many lovers as they say?" and Larita replies, "Of course not. Hardly any of them actually loved me." The film appeared to have been lost until the late 1970s when a print emerged in Austria. It was shown for the first time in fifty years as part of a Hitchcock retrospective. At the time, the film critic David Robinson said, "It is Hitchcock in the making (and perhaps, into the bargain, Coward unmade), but as a period curiosity the National Film Archive and the Österreichische Filmmuseum [who found the copy] deserve gratitude for its resurrection." The surviving restoration of the film, conflated from several incomplete prints, is missing more than a quarter of its original footage.

A 2008 remake by Ealing Studios, with Stephan Elliott co-writing and directing, starred Jessica Biel, Ben Barnes, Colin Firth and Kristin Scott Thomas. This version follows the story more closely, and uses much of Coward's dialogue, although it has been fashioned more directly into the type of comedy for which Coward subsequently became famous. It differs from the play in several major respects: the character of Charles Burleigh is removed and amalgamated into the characters of Philip Hurst and Major Whittaker (who had been a captain who led his entire company to death); Larita's husband did not divorce her, but instead died after she euthanised him with poison to accelerate his lingering death from cancer; and the structure is rearranged so that the fight with John's family occurs at the end of the movie, after John refuses to dance with his wife. When Larita leaves, Major Whittaker goes with her.

The films dealt differently with Larita's backstory, as revealed in the dénouement by Hilda, with Hitchcock dedicating half of his version to John and Larita's relationship in Cannes, and Elliott offering a twist on the suicide theme.

=== Radio ===
A 1999 BBC Radio 3 recording, adapted and directed by Maria Aitken, starred Anton Lesser, Rupert Penry-Jones, Jack Davenport, Anna Massey and Victoria Hamilton.
