= Eliza Humphreys =

Scottish novelist (1850–1938)

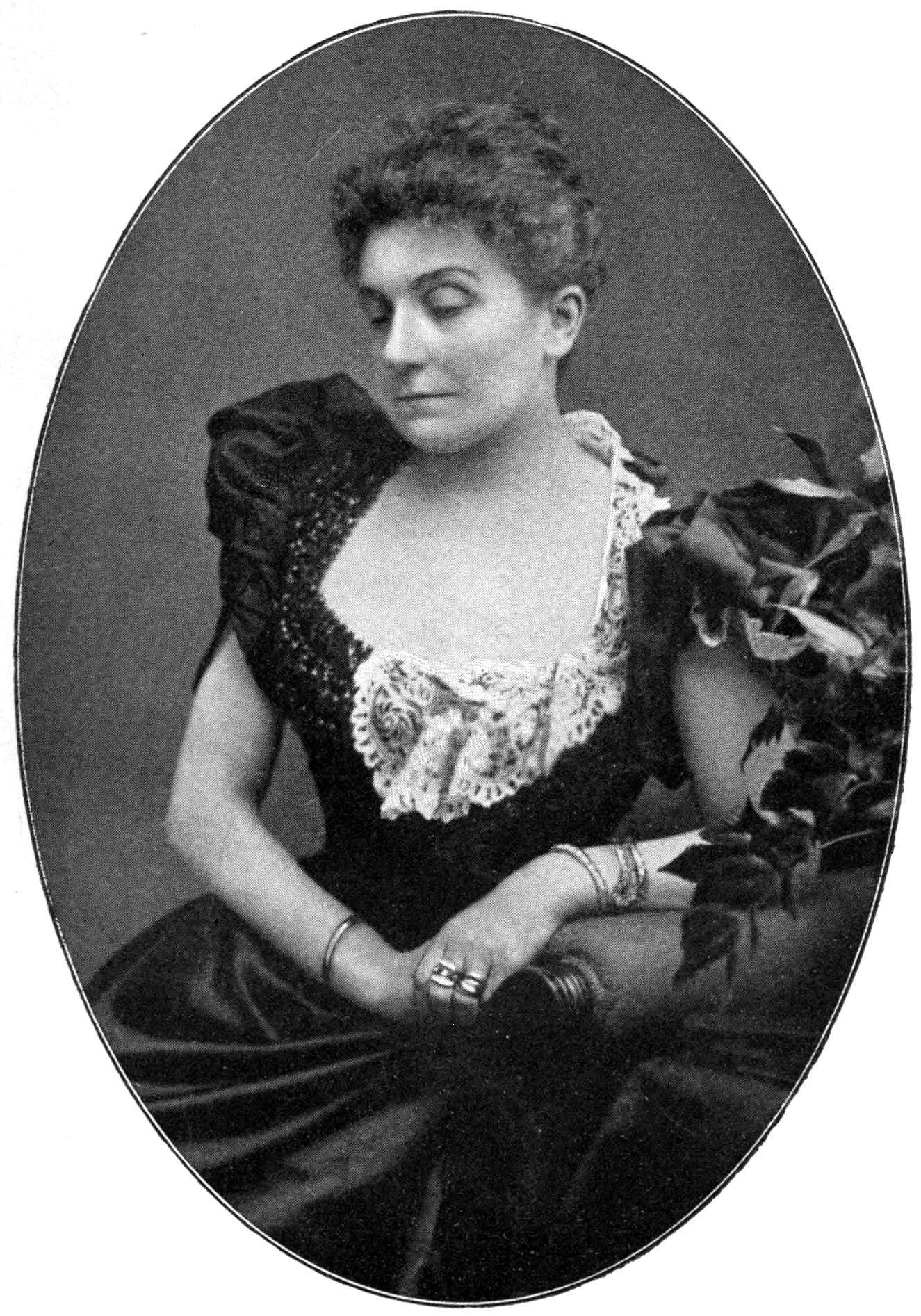
- Gollan in 1906
- Born: 14 June 1850; Gollanfield, Inverness-shire, Scotland
- Died: 1 January 1938 (aged 87); Combe Down, Bath, England
- Occupation: Novelist
- Years active: 1877–1938
- Known for: Popular writer of 120 novels, plays and essays
- Notable work: A Husband of No Importance (1894); Souls (1903); Calvary (1909)
- Spouses: Karl Booth (from 1872-?); Ernest (Desmond) Humphreys (until 1938)
- Children: 4 children (3 sons from 1st marriage to Karl Booth and 1 daughter from 2nd marriage to Ernest Humphreys)

Elizabeth Margaret Jane Humphreys née Gollan (14 June 1850 – 1 January 1938) was a Scottish novelist from Inverness-shire who wrote 120 books, plays and essays, and founded the Writers’ Club for Women. Many of her works were published under the pseudonym Rita.

== Biography ==
Eliza Margaret Jane Gollan was born at Gollanfield in Inverness-shire, the daughter of John Gilbert Gollan, a Scottish businessman and his wife Jane Plumb, daughter of the manager of the Bank of Bengal. Her father travelled extensively, visiting India and Australia, and became a landowner in Scotland following his inheriting the family home at Gollanfield. This necessitated the family to move from India to Scotland to take ownership. Eliza Gollan was born on 14 June 1850 on the family estate as the second of three children.

The family then moved to Sydney, Australia where her father had business interests and she was raised and home educated there. The business venture turned out disappointingly however and the family returned to London when Gollan turned 14 years old. Eliza received little formal education, but her talent for story writing was apparent at an early age. She used her experience of Australia to write a semi-autobiographical novel Sheba in 1889, using the pen-name ‘Rita’. Another novel, Episodes, was originally published using the pen-name 'E. Jayne Gilbert.'

Eliza was married twice. On 23 July 1872, aged just 22, she married Karl Otto Edmund Booth, a musician, with whom she had three sons. This unhappy marriage later provided Eliza with material for four novels Saba Macdonald (1906) The Grandmothers (1927), The Wand’ring Darling (1928) and Jean and Jeanette (1929). The marriage to Booth ended, but the author went on to a happy union with Anglo-Irish singer William Humphreys, with whom she had a daughter. Humphreys used the stage name, Desmond Humphreys, and after their marriage Eliza was known as Mrs. W. Desmond Humphreys. Eliza spent her married life in Cork, Ireland, Bournemouth and Bath, Somerset. In 1910, she was listed as one of the celebrities of Bournemouth, with books published in French, German and Italian; at the time she was undertaking a tour of America.

The dedication in the first edition of Saba Macdonald reads: To "THE EMANACIPATED WOMAN" who owes her present freedom of mind, morals, and pastimes, to such repression and tyranny as formed the discipline of youth in days such as this book commemorates.

== Writing career ==
Under the penname 'Rita', Gollan produced a remarkable 120 books, plays and essays from 1877 onwards when she was still in her twenties. These started as 'light', 'daring' works of popular fiction, often featuring aristocratic characters in fashionable foreign settings. Gollan herself was an admirer of the works of Ouida but she was more often compared as a rival with her contemporary, the bestselling English novelist, Marie Corelli.

Gollan's widespread recognition grew as a popular writer with Dame Durden in 1883 while it was Peg the Rake (1894) that earned her real commercial success, having sold 160,000 copies.

She helped to found the Lyceum Club Writers’ Club for Women.

Her later work became infused with her own opinions and beliefs and works such as A Husband of No Importance (1894) and Souls (1903) were vehicles for attacking an emerging trend in novels at the time, the New Woman movement, fearing that women were 'aping men' and disapproving of what might be later termed polemical feminism. A Husband of No Importance (1894) was also more than a passing nod to Oscar Wilde's play A Woman of No Importance, which had opened in 1893.

After meeting Madame Blavatsky she became interested in Theosophy and wrote Calvary: A Tragedy of Sects (1909) exploring religious themes. This was one of her books that was made into a film, as were other works Grim Justice and The Iron Stair.

After the First World War Eliza struggled financially, as her husband became an invalid and her style of writing went out of fashion. However in 1930 she received a Royal Bounty Fund grant for her work, and Queen Mary liked her books and ordered a complete set of her works for her private bookcase.

Eliza Humphrey’s final book was an autobiography Recollections of a Literary Life (1936). In the preface, her friend Sir Philip Gibbs wrote:

'Somehow I think of “Rita”'s readers as lying on deck-chairs in pre-war summers, as tourists in Venice and other pleasant places where well-to-do English people used to take their holidays.'

Eliza Humphreys died of heart failure, aged 87, on 1 January 1938 at the family home at 239 West Brow, Combe Down, Bath; her husband died in the following year.

== Literature ==
A Husband of No Importance is set in Salwych, which "Rita" based strongly on Droitwich Spa in Worcestershire, after visiting the town for treatment at its brine baths, in 1906.

== Biography ==
A biography, "Rita" The Forgotten Author. has been written by Paul Jones.

== Novels and short stories ==
"The Iron Stair, A romance of Dartmoor" (1916)

- Vivienne (1877) serialized as 'The Triumph of Love' (1914)
- Like Dian's Kiss (1878)
- Countess Daphne - A Musical Romance (1880)
- My Lady Coquette (1881)
- A Sinless Secret (1881)
- She is Woman, Therefore to be Won (short story) (1881)
- Faustine (1882)
- Dame Durden (1883)
- After Long Grief and Pain (1883)
- Two Bad Blue Eyes (1884)
- My Lord Conceit (1884)
- Fragoletta (1885)
- Corinna (1885)
- Gretchen (Published elsewhere as 'Adrian Lyle') (1887)
- The Seventh Dream (1888)
- Darby and Joan (1888)
- The Mystery of a Turkish Bath (1888)
- Miss Kate; or, Confessions of a Caretaker (1889)
- Sheba. A Study of Girlhood (1889)
- A Vagabond Lover (1889)
- The Doctor's Secret (1890)
- A Society Scandal (1890)
- The Laird o'Cockpen (1891)
- Brought Together. A volume of stories (1892)
- Asenath of the Ford (1892)
- The Fate of Fenella (1892) Ch. VII - "So Near -- So Far Away"
- The Countess Pharamond (1893), Sequel to Sheba
- The Man in Possession (1893)
- Naughty Mrs. Gordon. A romance of society (1894)
- A Husband of No Importance (1894)
- The Ending of My Day. The story of a stormy life. (1894)
- Peg the Rake (1894)
- Master Wilberforce. A study of a boy. (1895)
- A Woman in It. A sketch of feminine misadventure. (1895)
- A Gender in Satin (1895)
- Vignettes (1896)
- Kitty the Rag (1896)
- Joan and Mrs. Carr (1896)
- Good Mrs Hypocrite (1897)
- The Sinner, serialized as The Grinding Mills of God (1897)
- Stephen Wynthorpe's Presentiment (short story) (1897)
- Adrienne: A Romance of French Life (1898)
- Petticoat Loose, serialized as A Daughter of the People (1898)
- The Voice on the Stairs (short story) (1898)
- An Old Rogue's Tragedy (1899)
- Vanity. The confessions of a Court modiste (1900)
- A Woman of Samaria, serialized as The Mystery of the Dark House (1900)
- The Bohemians (short story) (1900)
- Prince Charming. A fantastic episode in court dress (1901)
- The Sin of Jasper Standish (1901)
- The Ending of my Day (1901)
- A Jilt's Journal (1901)
- The Spell of The Yarrow (short story) 1901)
- The Lie Circumspect (1902), serialized as A Craven Heart (1902)
- Prince Charming, etc. (1903)
- Souls. A Comedy of Intentions (1903)
- The Valley of Desolation (short story) (1903)
- The Jesters (1904)
- The Silent Woman (1904) serialized as The Mystery of the 'Headless Woman' Inn (1904)
- The Sin and Scandal of the 'Smart' Set (1904)
- Vanity! (1904)
- The Masqueraders (1904)
- Valley of Desolation (short story) (1904)
- Queer Lady Judas (1905)
- The Baths of Salwych (short story) (1905)
- Saba Macdonald (1906)
- Personal Opinions Publicly Expressed (1907)
- A Man of no Importance (1907)
- The Pointing Finger (1907)
- The Millionaire Girl and other stories (1908) comprising:
1. The Millionaire Girl
2. The Other Woman
3. The Boots at No. 40
4. The Passing of Miss Flint
5. The Crank
6. Riviera studies: The brave Mariana, The Tremblement at Bussana, The Haunted Bedroom, The Sealed Door
7. The treacherous mountain
8. The valley of desolation
9. A Test of Endurance
- Betty Brent, Typist (1908)
- Calvary. A tragedy of sects. (1909)
- That is to say--. [Tales.] (1909)
- The Faithful Billium (short story) (1909)
- The Story of a Soul (short story) (1910)
- America-through English eyes (1911)
- Only an Actress (1911)
- Half a Truth (1911)
- Grim Justice. The study of a conscience. (1912)
- Edelweiss (1912)
- Two Detrimentals (short story) (1912)
- The Mystic and The Colonel (short story) (1912)
- The House Opposite (1913)
- A Grey Life. A romance of modern Bath. (1913)
- The Young Horatius (1914)
- The Simpleton (short story) (1914)
- The Ink-Slinger (1915)
- Unmasking the Hun - What the War has Revealed (Short article) (1916)
- The Wrong End of Religion (1917)
- The Rubbish Heap (1917)
- Diana of the Ephesians: A Novel. (1919)
- The Philanthropic Burglar (1919)
- The Make-believers (1920)
- When the Wicked Man, and other stories. (1920)
- The Iron Stair. A romance of Dartmoor. (1921)
- The Best Lover [and other tales]. (1921)
- Pat the Pedlar (1922)
- The Road to Anywhere (1922)
- Conjugal Rights, and other stories. (1922)
- The Man Who Understood (1923)
- The Ungrown-Ups. (1923)
- Episodes. By Rita. Originally published as by E. Jayne Gilbert. (1925)
- The Farm of Melchizedek (1925)
- The Great “Perhaps.” (1926)
- Our Miss Acadee (1926)
- The Grandmothers (1927)
- The Prince Errant, and other stories. (1928)
- The Wand'ring Darling (1928)
- Jean and Jeannette (1929)
- Quarrelsome Corner (1930)
- The New Poor. A romance of to-day. (1931)
- The Naughty Grandfather (1932)
- Six Mistresses, etc. (1932)
- The Ladies of Moyallo (1933)
- The Pointing Finger (1934)
- The Marriage Comedy (1934)
- Recollections of a literary life (1936)
