= The Woman Between =

The Woman Between may refer to:

- The Woman Between (1931 American film)
- The Woman Between (1931 British film)
