= Gollanfield Junction railway station =

Former railway station in Scotland

Coordinates: 57.5510°N 4.0087°W

Gollanfield Junction
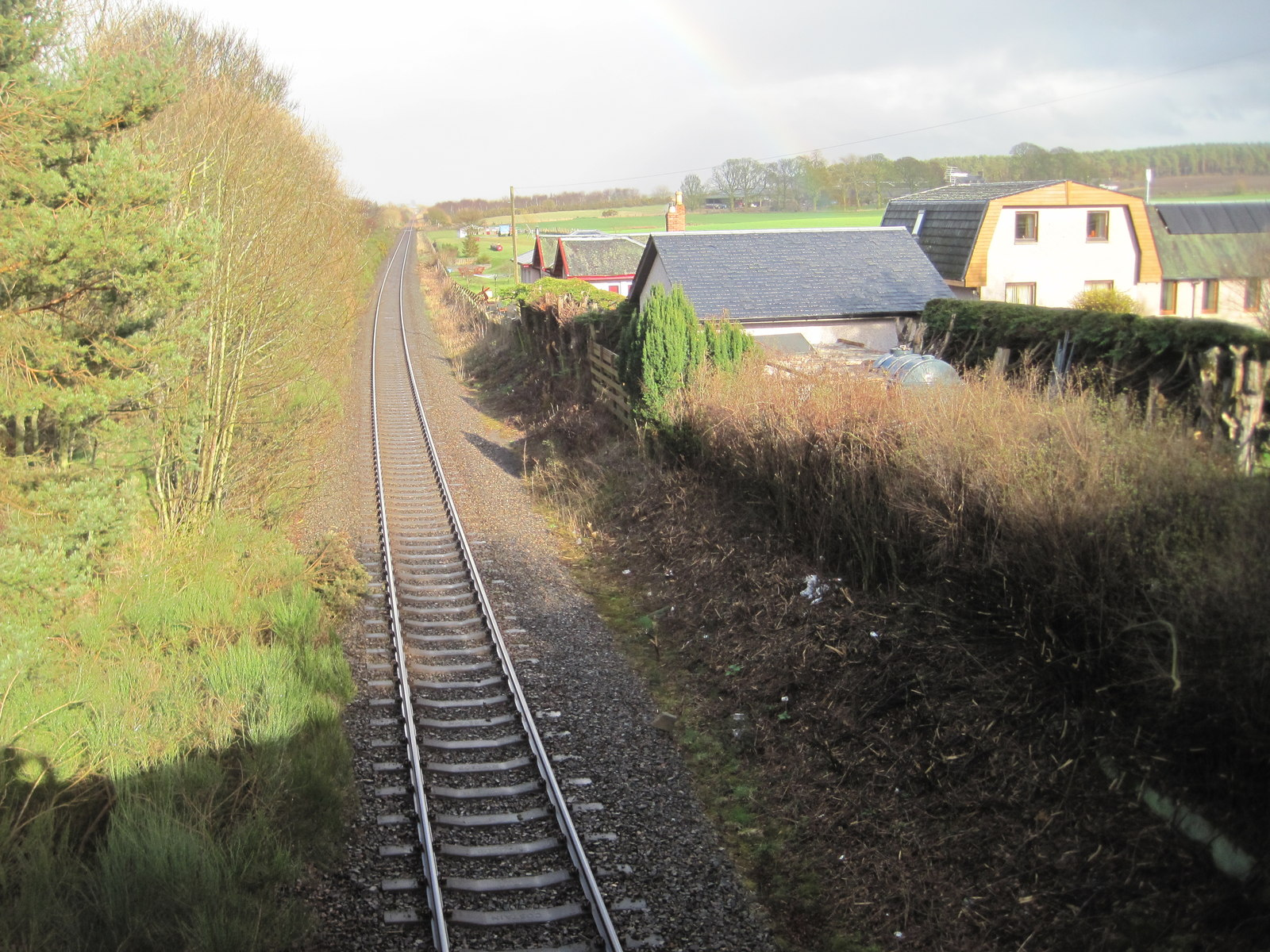
- The site of the station in 2015

General information
- Location: Gollanfield, Highland; Scotland
- Platforms: 2

Other information
- Status: Disused

History
- Original company: Inverness and Nairn Railway
- Pre-grouping: Highland Railway
- Post-grouping: London, Midland and Scottish Railway

Key dates
- 7 November 1855: Opened as Fort George
- 1 July 1899: Renamed Gollanfield Junction
- March 1959: Renamed Gollanfield
- 3 May 1965: Closed
Location

Gollanfield Junction was a railway station located at Gollanfield, to the west of Nairn, Scotland, (now in the Highland Council Area). Opened in 1855 by the Inverness and Nairn Railway, it was initially named Fort George after the military base nearby.

In July 1899, the Highland Railway opened a direct branch to Fort George (which was actually sited in the village of Ardersier). With the opening of the branch, the station was renamed Gollanfield Junction. Passenger services on the branch were withdrawn in 1943 and it closed to all traffic in August 1958. The following year, the station was renamed Gollanfield by British Railways.

Goods traffic at the station ceased in May 1964 and it was closed to passenger traffic on 3 May 1965 (along with all the other remaining stations between Nairn & Inverness) as a result of the Beeching Axe.

Most of the buildings were subsequently demolished after closure, but the station house remain standing and is used as a private residence. A single line remains in use by passenger trains between Inverness, Elgin and Aberdeen.

== Accident ==
In 1953, a head-on collision between an eastbound Inverness to Keith passenger train and a westbound freight train just west of the station resulted in the deaths of three train crew (both drivers and the passenger train fireman) and injuries to three passengers & the goods train fireman. The driver of the freight train was held culpable for the accident for failing to regulate the speed of his train on approach to the station, though the station signalman was also censured for lowering the home signal prematurely and thus misleading the driver into thinking the starting signal ahead would also be clear.

Preceding station	Historical railways	Following station
Nairn; Line and station open	Highland Railway; Inverness and Nairn Railway	Dalcross; Line open; station closed
	Disused railways	
Terminus	Highland Railway; Fort George branch line	Fort George; Line and station closed
