= Lovers in Araby =

1924 film directed by Adrian Brunel

- Directed by: Adrian Brunel
- Written by: Adrian Brunel; Miles Mander
- Produced by: Ivor Novello
- Starring: Annette Benson; Miles Mander; Norman Penrose; Adrian Brunel
- Production company: Atlas Biocraft
- Distributed by: Novello-Atlas
- Release date: May 1924
- Running time: 5,200 feet
- Country: United Kingdom
- Language: English

Lovers in Araby is a 1924 British silent adventure film directed by Adrian Brunel and starring Annette Benson, Miles Mander and Norman Penrose. Much of the film was shot on location in North Africa.

== Cast ==
- Annette Benson as Nadine Melville
- Miles Mander as Derek Fare
- Norman Penrose as Paul Melville
- Adrian Brunel as Martin Carme

== Bibliography ==
- Low, Rachael. History of the British Film, 1918-1929. George Allen & Unwin, 1971.
