= Open Country (film) =

1922 film

- Directed by: Sinclair Hill
- Written by: Maurice Hewlett (novel); Sinclair Hill
- Starring: Dorinea Shirley; David Hawthorne; Bertram Burleigh
- Cinematography: Alfred H. Moise
- Production company: Stoll Pictures
- Distributed by: Stoll Pictures
- Release date: December 1922
- Country: United Kingdom
- Languages: Silent; English intertitles

Open Country is a 1922 British silent drama film directed by Sinclair Hill and starring Dorinea Shirley, David Hawthorne and Bertram Burleigh. The film's sets were designed by the head of Stoll Pictures's art department Walter Murton.

== Synopsis ==
A wealthy man decides to become a wandering artist.

== Cast ==
- Dorinea Shirley as Sanchia Percival
- David Hawthorne as Neville Ingram
- Bertram Burleigh as Jack Senhouse
- George Bellamy as Mr. Percival
- Norma Whalley as Mrs. Percival
- Miles Mander as Honorable William Chevenix
- Bryan Powley as Roger Charnock
- Rosina Wright

== Bibliography ==
- Low, Rachael. History of the British Film, 1918-1929. George Allen & Unwin, 1971.
