= Incident at Raven's Gate =

- Film poster
- Directed by: Rolf de Heer
- Screenplay by: Marc Rosenberg; Rolf de Heer
- Based on: an original screenplay by James Michael Vernon
- Produced by: Rolf de Heer; Marc Rosenberg
- Starring: Steven Vidler
- Cinematography: Richard Michalak
- Edited by: Suresh Ayyar
- Music by: Graham Tardif; Roman Kronen
- Production companies: Hemdale Film Corporation; FGH; International Film Management
- Distributed by: Filmpac Holdings
- Release date: 29 April 1988
- Running time: 94 minutes
- Country: Australia
- Language: English
- Budget: AU$2.5 million

Incident at Raven's Gate (also released as Encounter at Raven's Gate) is a 1988 science fiction arthouse feature film directed by prominent Australian director Rolf de Heer.

The cast of Incident at Raven's Gate includes long-term Australian stage and screen actor Max Cullen as a policeman and Terry Camilleri as an astrophysicist attached to Special Branch, investigating unexplained radar signals in a remote South Australian country town.

== Plot ==
At Raven's Gate, a farming property, enthusiastic hydroponicist Richard Cleary (Ritchie Singer) is trying innovative farming practices. He is also trying to accommodate his brother Eddie (Steven Vidler), newly out of jail and more interested in Richard's wife Rachel (Celine Griffin) (Note: Also known as Celine O'Leary) than in working on the property.

Strange events on the property and a minor crime in the town attract policeman Taylor (Max Cullen) and Special Branch investigator Cummings (Terry Camilleri). Eddie has the misfortune to cross local cop Skinner (Vincent Gil), for dating the target of his affections, barmaid Annie (Saturday Rosenberg).

Tensions in personal relationships and mysterious events (bird kills, disappearing water supplies) build. Raven's Gate is assaulted by an alien force, and a number of deaths occur amongst the protagonists. The film closes with the stunned survivors Eddie and Rachel standing outside Raven's Gate homestead, newly restored by Special Branch, and the soundtrack playing the Easybeats' song "Friday on My Mind".

== Cast ==
- Ritchie Singer as Richard Cleary
- Steven Vidler as Eddie
- Celine Griffin as Rachel
- Max Cullen as Taylor
- Terry Camilleri as Special Branch Investigator Hemmings
- Vincent Gil as Skinner
- Saturday Rosenberg as Annie

== Production ==
Incident at Raven's Gate is a genre-crossing film: part thriller, part science fiction, and part psychological drama. It was shot on location and made in South Australia, with South Australian Film Corporation support, for a budget of A$2.5 million. The filmmakers say only $1.1 million was spent on the actual film, and the rest were fees for executive producers, writers and producers.

It was co-produced by de Heer and Marc Rosenberg, who wrote the script from a screenplay by James Michael Vernon. It was filmed in South Australia's Riverland and Murraylands, and Carrington, New South Wales.

== Critical reception ==
The movie achieved only limited release and did not receive the critical acclaim of many other de Heer films. It nevertheless managed three nominations at the 1988 Australian Film Institute Awards.

Other reviews

- Hutak, M. (1989). 'Incident at Raven's Gate', Film News, April, no. 3.
- Stratton, D. (1988). 'Incident at Raven's Gate', Variety, August.

== See also ==
- Cinema of Australia
