= Clifford Pember =

British art director (1881–1955)

- Born: 1881; Kingston upon Thames, Surrey, England
- Died: 1955 (aged 73–74)
- Occupation: Art Director
- Years active: 1918–1947 (theatre); 1920–1937 (film)

Clifford Fanshawe Pember (1881–1955) was a British art director notable for his set designs in British cinema and theatre. Pember worked on films during the late silent and early sound eras. Pember originally trained as an architect. In 1928 he designed the sets for Alfred Hitchcock's film Easy Virtue, adapted from the play by Noël Coward. Along with Walter Murton, Pember has been identified as belonging to the "old school" of British set designers who resisted changes brought by new modernist influences (particularly by German immigrants).

== Selected filmography ==
- Dawn (1928)
- Easy Virtue (1928)
- The Vortex (1928)
- The Triumph of the Scarlet Pimpernel (1928)
- The Woman in White (1929)
- Escape (1930)
- Birds of Prey (1930)
- Captain's Orders (1937)

== Bibliography ==
- Bergfelder, Tim & Cargnelli, Christian. Destination London: German-speaking emigrés and British cinema, 1925-1950. Berghahn Books, 2008.
