= Captain's Orders =

1937 film by Ivar Campbell

- Jane Carr and Henry Edwards in the film
- Directed by: Ivar Campbell
- Written by: Frank Shaw
- Starring: Henry Edwards; Jane Carr; Marie La Varre
- Production company: Liberty Films
- Release date: December 1937
- Running time: 75 minutes
- Country: United Kingdom
- Language: English

Captain's Orders is a 1937 British comedy-drama film directed by Ivar Campbell and starring Henry Edwards, Jane Carr, Marie La Varre, Wally Patch and Basil Radford. It was made as a quota quickie. The film's sets were designed by Clifford Pember, in his final production.

== Plot ==
Captain Trent wants to keep cargo steamer Welcome at work, despite it being laid off during an industrial slow-down, even if it means paying for it himself. Funded by a loan, the Welcome puts to sea, heading for New York, but as the destination nears the ship picks up an SOS from a yacht, and Captain Trent takes the Welcome to help. Those rescued include a haughty film star, with whom Trent finds romance.

== Cast ==
- Henry Edwards as Captain Trent
- Jane Carr as Belle Mandeville
- Marie La Varre as Violet Potts
- Franklin Dyall as Newton
- Wally Patch as Johnstone
- C. Denier Warren as Lawson
- Mark Daly as Scotty
- Roddy Hughes as Cookie
- Basil Radford as Murdoch
- Kim Peacock as Aubrey Chaytor
- Joss Ambler as Randolph Potts
- H. F. Maltby as Director

== Reception ==
The Monthly Film Bulletin wrote: "Seafaring story with an authentic British touch, natural humour and a real theme ... excellent entertainment."

Kine Weekly wrote: "The direction aims at action and variety (including vaudeville) and in this attains a fair measure of success. But some of the incidents are silly without being funny, and only assist to make the film longer than it should be."

The Daily Film Renter wrote: "The subject is of a slender order, but proves a pleasantly contrived show which will please all who remember their Henry Edwards. Jane Carr is rather less effective, and the drawn-out song numbers she has to put over are tedious interludes rather than supplying any addition to the entertainment. Seascapes and well photographed backgrounds provide the visual appeal."

Picture Show wrote: "Simple story, straightforwardly told and very competently acted. ... It is well set and directed."
