= Saturday Rosenberg =

Australian comedian, writer, and actress

- Born: Llewellyn Saturday Jobbins; 13 July 1952; Melbourne, Australia
- Died: 13 August 1998 (aged 46); Sydney, Australia
- Occupations: Screenwriter, Comedian

Saturday Llewellyn Rosenberg (born Llewellyn Saturday Jobbins), also known as Saturday Brander (13 July 1952 – 13 August 1998), was an Australian comedian, writer and actress.

== Early life ==
Saturday Llewellyn Rosenberg was born Llewellyn Saturday Jobbins on 13 July 1952 in Eltham near Melbourne, Victoria, but grew up in Sydney, New South Wales. She was a third-generation Australian filmmaker, whose family includes: grandfather, cinematographer George Malcolm; parents, advertising executives Harry and Joy Jobbins; and uncle, sound recordist Ken Malcolm. She is also one of five siblings, including Boak Jobbins and Sheridan Jobbins.

== Career ==
After completing high school at Ascham in Sydney, she moved to Perth, in Western Australia in the late 1970s where she studied Fine Arts at WAAPA, and, at the same time, started a catering business called Big Belly Bus with her first husband.

She hosted two children's television shows called, Dr Featherweather's Wonderful Workshop and Flapper's Factory (Perth, 1970) for two years.

On returning to Sydney in the early 1980s, she became a part of the New Wave of comedy, which sprang out The Comedy Store in Jamison Street. There she performed under her married name, Saturday Brander, alongside comedians like Rodney Rude, Vince Sorrenti, Austen Tayshus, and George Smilovici. She was a member of the Comedy Store group "The Fourskins" with Roddy Lee, Katrina Valkenburg, and Robert Stephens. She used a lot of material gained during her catering days, as well as material from working with children on television. Her most famous character was an alter-ego called Debbie Fellini.

She went on to write several films, notably The Girl Who Came Late, which was released in Australia as Daydream Believer. The film, released in 1992, starred Martin Kemp and Miranda Otto. Other film credits include Cappuccino (1989) and When Ships Draw Near (1991).

She also wrote several films for director Paul Middleditch, including one called The Tin Box, and another in which she starred, called When Ships Draw Near. The latter was selected for screening at the Clermont Film Festival, and won Bronze at the 21st Huesca Film Festival.

She also appeared in films and television shows including Dingo, Incident at Raven's Gate, and the Australian TV show Prisoner.

== Later life and death ==
For the last five years of her life, Rosenberg lived in Los Angeles, where she attended the University of Southern California studying screen direction. A film she wrote and directed, Freedom From Hunger, was chosen as an entrant into the Tropfest film festival, and screened after her death at the festival director's discretion.

Saturday returned to Australia, and was hit and killed by a tourist bus on the corner of Market and College Streets in Sydney on 13 August 1998.

== Personal life ==
Rosenberg was married twice, firstly in Perth, to William Brander (m. 1977–1979, divorced) and later to Marc Rosenberg (m. 1986–1990, divorced).
