= Miles Mander =

English actor (1888–1946)

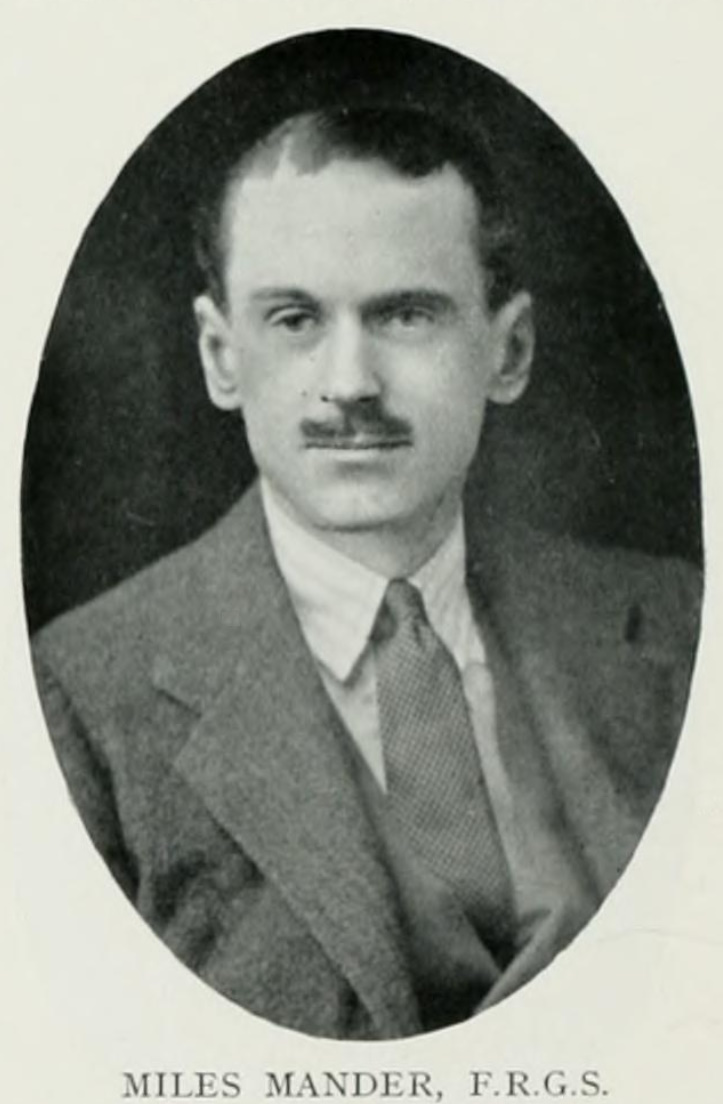
- Miles Mander in about 1922
- Born: Lionel Henry Mander; 14 May 1888; Wolverhampton, Staffordshire, England
- Died: 8 February 1946 (aged 57); Los Angeles, California, U.S.
- Other name: Luther Miles
- Years active: 1920–1946
- Spouses: Princess Prativa Devi (m. 1912; div. 1922) Kathleen French (m. 1923–1946)
- Children: 1

Miles Mander (born Lionel Henry Mander; 14 May 1888 – 8 February 1946), was an English character actor, writer, director and producer in the post-war period of early British cinema during the 1920s to mid-1930s, as well as a playwright and novelist.

From a privileged upper middle-class background, as a young man Mander engaged in motor sports, aviation and ballooning. In World War I he served in France with tethered kite balloons used for military observation. From 1920 to 1936 Mander was involved in the British film industry in various capacities. He acted in both silent and sound films and was involved with several film production companies. He began writing screenplays and directing in the mid-1920s, working on early sound films. Mander directed his first feature film in 1928. With the advent of sound films he established an international reputation as a character actor. After directing The Flying Doctor in Australia in 1936, Mander lived and worked in Hollywood, where he was cast in over 60 feature films until his death in 1946.

== Biography ==
=== Early life ===
Lionel Henry Mander was born on 14 May 1888 at Wolverhampton in Staffordshire, the second son of S. Theodore Mander and Flora (née Paint). The family lived at Wightwick Manor; his father was a paint manufacturer who served as mayor of Wolverhampton, a member of the prominent Mander family, industrialists and public servants of the Midlands region.^{[A]} His father died in September 1900, when Lionel was aged twelve, and his mother died in April 1905.

From 1901 to early 1903 Mander was educated at Harrow School in Greater London, where he resided at The Grove boarding house.^{[B]} After leaving Harrow Mander was educated in Canada, where his mother had family connections. He attended the Loretto School and McGill University in Montreal. Mander had early acting experience in musical comedy, including tours in Canada and the United States.

=== Aviation and motoring ===
By 1907 Mander was employed as a mechanic in the Daimler workshops in London. He showed an early interest in driving automobiles at speed and was a competitor in the first race meeting at the motor racing circuit at Brooklands, near Weybridge in Surrey, the first purpose-built 'banked' racing track which opened in June 1907. Mander drove a 60 horse-power Mercedes on the Brooklands racing circuit.

In 1908 Mander visited his uncle Martin Mander in New Zealand and for a short period took up sheep farming on his uncle's station. Martin Mander had emigrated to New Zealand in 1890 and established the 'Horoeka-Waimata' sheep station in the Waimata Valley, near Gisborne on the north-east coast of New Zealand's North Island. In early 1909 Lionel Mander lived briefly in Australia. He left Australia aboard the R.M.S. India, which departed from Sydney for London in May 1909.

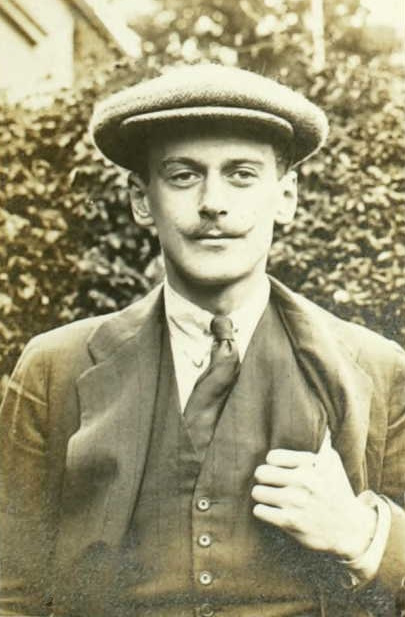
Photograph of Lionel Henry Mander in about 1913.

After returning to Britain Mander took an interest in aviation. He attended Louis Blériot's pilot training school at Pau in southern France and purchased a Blériot XI monoplane. In early 1910 Mander took flying lessons with Claude Grahame-White at the Brooklands aerodrome (adjoining the motor racing circuit). His aircraft crashed at Brooklands requiring a new wing to be fitted. In May 1910 a man named Alfred Hooper was riding his bicycle to work when a car driven by Mander "ran into him and knocked him down". Mander was living at Wolverhampton at the time. Hooper was injured to such an extent that he was absent from work for twelve weeks. In October 1910 he was awarded £60 damages in a West Bromwich court.

Mander was an entrant in the first all-British aviation meeting at Dunstall Park in Wolverhampton, held from 27 June to 2 July 1910. He was one of four novice pilots yet to receive their aviator's certificate from the Royal Aero Club, necessary for participation in the events. In the end Mander did not qualify in time and had to withdraw. On the second day of the meeting strong winds demolished Mander's temporary canvas hangar housing his monoplane.

Mander invested in Grahame-White's company that developed the Hendon Aerodrome in London.

Mander also engaged in boxing promotions during this period.

On 21 February 1912 Mander and Prativa Sundari Devi were married at Calcutta in India. Prativa was an Indian princess of the princely state of Cooch Behar, British India, the second daughter of Maharaja Nripendra Narayan and Maharani Suniti Devi of Cooch Behar. The couple celebrated their marriage at the residence of the bride's father, dressed in Indian costume and married in the Hindu Brahmo Samaj rites. After the marriage the couple returned to England, initially living in Buckingham Gate in London. Mander later claimed that the marriage was "unhappy owing to his wife's violent temper". In 1914 Mander's brother Alan married Princess Sudhira, Prativa's sister, in Calcutta.

Mander began free ballooning in 1912. In early 1913 Mander, in company with the aviator Claude Grahame-White, made his first ascent in a gas balloon, launched from Saint-Cloud in the western suburbs of Paris. He received his aeronaut's certificate from the Royal Aero Club in June 1913.

=== War service ===
In late September 1914 Lionel Henry Mander was declared to be bankrupt. He was described as a financier of Trafalgar House in Regent Street, London.

Mander enlisted in the British armed forces (Royal Marines) on 20 September 1914. He was promoted to sergeant soon after enlisting. He was promoted to sub-lieutenant in February 1915 in the Royal Naval Division (RND), made up of volunteers and reservists not needed for service at sea. A month later Mander was commissioned as a lieutenant in the Supply and Transport Company of the RND.

In the autumn of 1915 responsibility for kite balloons in France was transferred from the Royal Naval Air Service (RNAS) to the Royal Flying Corps (RFC). In 1915 Mander was transferred to the Royal Army Service Corps. Mander served with tethered kite balloons, which were extensively used for military observation during World War I.

=== Business ventures ===
After he was demobilised from the armed services Mander made a living by selling motor vehicles. His wife Prativa Mander had travelled to India in 1916; she returned to England in 1919, but she and Mander did not at first live together. Mander later claimed that the reason they lived apart was that "he had heard a report about her conduct while she was in India".

In March 1920 Mander participated in the Kop Hill Trial, organised by the Essex Motor Club, driving a Mathis automobile. A year or two after the war ended, Mander travelled in Albania after which he was elected as a fellow of the Royal Geographical Society. In 1925 he published Albania Today, a book based on his travels in that country.

With the motor industry in the doldrums in the immediate post-war years, at the suggestion of a friend Mander found occasional work in the British film industry, initially as an extra. Mander made his credited film acting debut in a small role in Testimony, a drama released in September 1920 by George Clark Productions. The film featured Ivy Duke and David Hawthorne in the leading roles and was directed by the actor Guy Newall (his directorial debut). In 1921 Mander appeared in two films produced by Stoll Pictures, credited under the name of Miles Mander. He played the role of 'Lieutenant Devereaux' in The Place of Honour (released in June 1921) and as 'Godfrey Norton' in A Scandal in Bohemia (released in July 1921), the seventh in a series of films based on Sir Arthur Conan Doyle's 'Sherlock Holmes' stories.

In June 1921 Mander petitioned for the dissolution of his marriage to Prativa "on the ground of her adultery with Mr. Reginald de Beer" (described as a clerk "employed in a Government office"). Mander gave evidence in the divorce court of having observed, in August 1920, Prativa and De Beer in bed together through the window of Prativa's flat in Wellington Court, Knightsbridge. A decree nisi was granted in about June 1922 (in which Mander was described as "a motor salesman" of High Street, St. John's Wood).

Mander was the general manager of Solar Films Ltd, a company with directors that included Adrian Brunel. Early in 1922 Solar Films took a twelve month lease of the Philharmonic Hall in order to present a series of travel film-lectures. The films were produced by "expert photographers on expeditions carried out on behalf of the company by distinguished travellers and explorers". The company planned to present the films accompanied by a lecture delivered by a traveller associated with the actual expedition. In February 1922 Solar Films Ltd. presented the first in a series of "film-lectures" at the Albert and Philharmonic Halls, on the subject of Burma delivered by Major-General Dunsterville. The film-lectures were not a success.

=== Film career ===
In 1922 Mander played roles in two films directed by Sinclair Hill, Half a Truth released in June 1922 and Open Country released in December 1922. In the early 1920s Mander was a member of a group described by the film producer Michael Balcon as "the Pack". The group, which included Alfred Hitchcock and Adrian Brunel, often "assembled at the Legrain coffee shop in Brewer Street, Soho, on the days we were not working (which were all too frequent)".

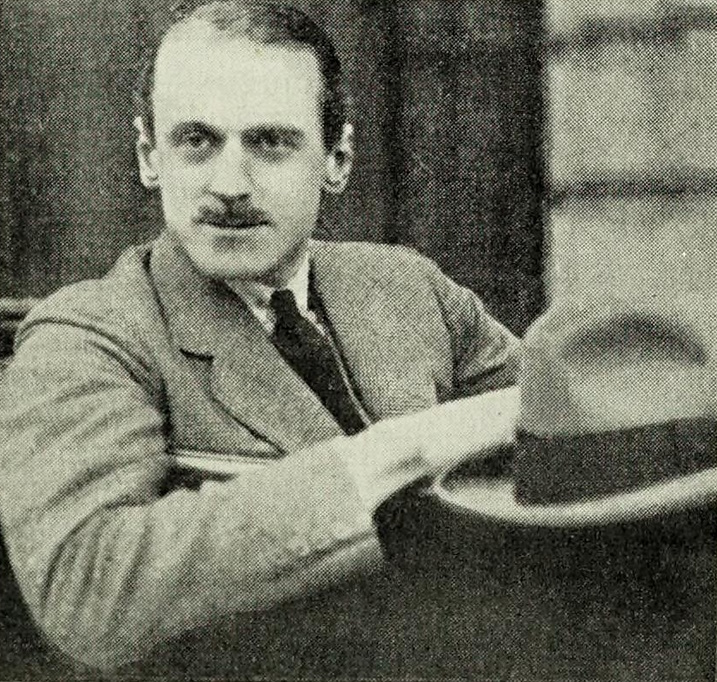
Miles Mander, published in Motion Picture Studio, October 1922.

In about October 1922 Mander, together with Brunel, Hugo Rumbold and Ivor Novello, formed a film production company called the Atlas Biocraft Company Ltd., financed by Jimmy White. The company's first film was The Man Without Desire, filmed in Italy and directed by Brunel, with Novello in the lead male role. Atlas Biocraft made a series of "ultra-cheap" short films during 1923 and 1924.

In 1923 Mander married for a second time. His second wife was Kathleen ('Bunty') French, of Sydney, Australia.^{[C]} The couple had a son named Theodore, born in 1926.

In 1924 Mander played a lead role in Lovers in Araby, an Atlas Biocraft film directed by Adrian Brunel. Mander and Brunel wrote the screenplay and much of the film was shot on location in North Africa. In 1925 Kathleen Mander appeared alongside her husband in a short comedy film, Cut It Out: A Day in the Life of a Censor, another Atlas Biocraft production directed by Brunel, in which she was credited as 'Mrs. Miles Mander'.

In 1925 Mander was cast in The Prude's Fall, directed by Graham Cutts, with Alfred Hitchcock as scenario writer, art director and assistant director. He was then cast as one of the male leads in The Pleasure Garden, Hitchcock's first feature film as director. The film was a collaboration between Gainsborough Pictures and the German Emelka Studios and was filmed on location in Italy and in the studio in Munich.

In late 1926 Mander joined the staff of De Forest Phonofilms, initially operating from a small studio in Clapham, and managed by the West End showman Vivian Van Damm. The company was producing short sound films called 'phonofilms', using an optical sound-on-film system developed in the early 1920s by the American inventors Lee de Forest and Theodore Case. Phonofilms, comprising mainly music hall sketches, songs and extracts from plays, began to be shown in the supporting programmes of British cinemas from October 1926. De Forest Phonofilms was later acquired by British Talking Pictures, with studios at Wembley. Mander was employed to write and direct a series of short 'talkie' films at the Wembley studios, being paid ten pounds for a screenplay and twenty pounds for directing. The sound quality of phonofilms was poor and was soon superseded by the superior Vitaphone process, used for early sound films from the late 1920s.

Mander directed and acted in the first London performances of his own plays, Those Common People in 1927 and It's a Pity About Humanity in 1930. He established a reputation as a film actor "by his studies of dissipated characters, such as drunkards or dope-addicts" in such films as The Fake (1927) and The Physician (1928).

Miles Mander and Madeleine Carroll in The First Born (1928).

In 1928 Mander collaborated with Alma Reville, Hitchcock's wife, on the script of The First Born, the scenario of which was based on Mander's stage play Those Common People and his novel Oasis. The First Born was directed by Mander, his first major film as director, and he also played the lead male role as the dissolute 'Sir Hugo Boycott', alongside Madeleine Carroll as his wife. The film critic Paul Rotha wrote that The First Born "provided evidence of his wit and intelligence in filmic expression... being almost entirely the product of Mander's creative mentality". However in the copy of the film released to the public, "much of Miles Mander's original conception was destroyed" when the film was edited by the distributing firm without the director's control.

In late 1930 and 1931 Mander directed two films for British International Pictures, both of them sound films made at the company's Elstree Studios near London. The Woman Between, adapted from a play by Miles Malleson, was released in January 1931. In the film Fascination, released in July 1931, Mander once again directed Madeleine Carroll as the female lead.

In 1933 Miles and Kathleen Mander were living in Knightsbridge, with a "week-end place" in Kent. In late 1934 Mander directed Youthful Folly for Sound City Films. Soon afterwards, at Julius Hagen's Twickenham Studios, he directed The Morals of Marcus (released in February 1935).

In 1935 Mander travelled to the United States and lived in Hollywood for nine months, during which he acted in Here's to Romance for the Fox Film Corporation and The Three Musketeers for RKO Radio Pictures. The Three Musketeers was the first American sound film adaptation of Alexandre Dumas' 1844 novel. Mander played the role of 'King Louis XIII' in the film, directed by Rowland V. Lee.

Soon after Mander returned to Britain from Hollywood, he was asked by the Gaumont-British Picture Corporation to undertake direction of The Flying Doctor, to be filmed in Australia. Gaumont-British had links to the Australian company National Productions Ltd., which was to produce the film with the assistance of production personnel from Gaumont-British. Mander arrived in Sydney aboard the Strathnaver on 12 November 1935, accompanied by Gaumont-British staff members John O. C. Orton (scenario department) and Thomas D. Connochie (production manager). They were later joined by Derek Williams, a lighting and camera expert. Another technician, Leslie Fry, was already in place at the Pagewood studios of National Studios Ltd. where the interior filming for The Flying Doctor was to take place. In late December 1935 it was announced that the Hollywood actor, Charles Farrell would play the lead in the film. Farrell arrived in Sydney on 27 January and shooting commenced on The Flying Doctor soon afterwards.

By early January 1936 Mander was driving in Sydney in a V-8 Vauxhall automobile. During his time in Sydney Mander was charged on two separate occasions with "driving at a speed dangerous to the public", on 3 February 1936 on Parramatta Road and on 10 March "in the vicinity of Bankstown, Warwick Farm and Liverpool". On the first occasion Mander had been driving the car with the female lead Mary Maguire as a passenger, returning from Leura filming location scenes for The Flying Doctor. He was convicted of the charges on 31 March 1936 and fines were imposed. The final day of shooting for the film was on 28 March. On 1 April 1936 Mander, together with Farrell and Orton, departed from Sydney for the United States aboard the Monterey.

Miles and Kathleen Mander divorced in 1936. In 1936 Mander left Britain to live in America, relocating to Hollywood.

=== Hollywood ===
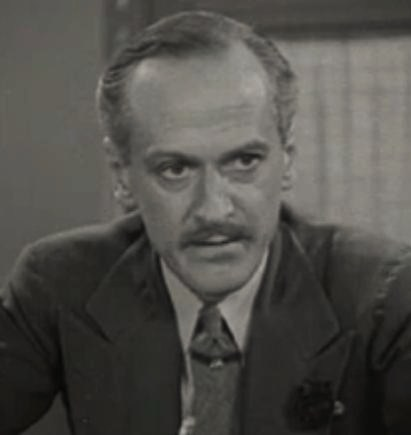
Miles Mander in Youth on Parole (1937)

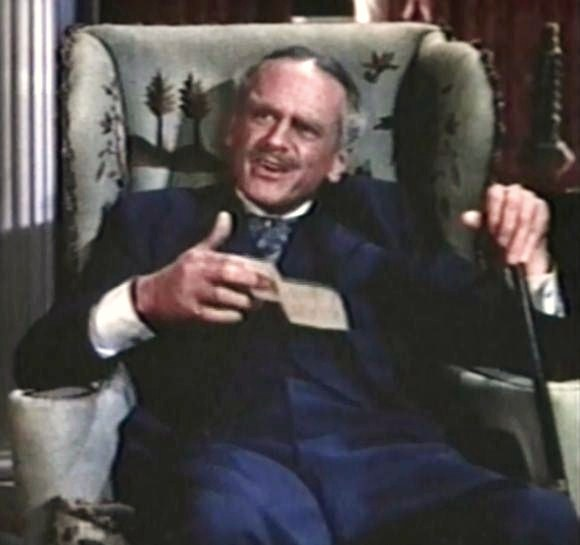
Mander as 'Lord Wickham' in The Little Princess (1939).

Mander was cast in more than 60 feature films after he went to live in Hollywood in 1936. Soon after his arrival he played a role in the historical drama Lloyd's of London, released in November 1936. The film featured Madeleine Carroll in the female lead, an actress Mander had earlier directed in The First Born (1928) and Fascination (1931). Mander was given opportunities to act in British roles in American films such as playing Benjamin Disraeli in Suez (1938) and King Henry VI in Tower of London (1939). He acted alongside Merle Oberon and Laurence Olivier in the Samuel Goldwyn Productions film Wuthering Heights (1939). In 1939 Mander played pivotal dual roles in Daredevils of the Red Circle, a twelve-chapter movie serial made by Republic Pictures. During his career in Hollywood he was often given character roles playing unctuous villains, many of them of the unprincipled English upper-class type.

In addition to his film output, Mander became well known as a radio commentator with his own popular programme.

By 1943 Mander was a member of the British Consulate War Services Advisory Board along with other members of the expatriate film community in Hollywood, including Brian Aherne, Ronald Colman, Cedric Hardwicke, Herbert Marshall, Basil Rathbone and the writer R. C. Sherriff.

Miles Mander died on 8 February 1946 at his home at 7231 Pacific View Drive in Hollywood, aged 57. His death was attributed to "a heart attack".^{[D]}

== Filmography ==
=== As actor ===
- Testimony (1920) (film debut)
- The Place of Honour (1921) as 'Lt. Devereaux'
- A Scandal in Bohemia (1921) as 'Godfrey Norton'
- The Temporary Lady (short) (1921) as 'Monkton'
- Half a Truth (1922) as 'Marquis Sallast'
- Open Country (1922) as 'Hon. William Chevenix'
- Lovers in Araby (1924) as 'Derek Fare'
- The Prude's Fall (1925) as 'Sir Neville Moreton'
- The Pleasure Garden (1925) as 'Levett'
- London Love (1926) as 'Sir James Daring'
- Tip Toes (1927) as 'Rollo Stevens'
- The Fake (1927) as 'Hon. Gerald Pillick'
- Parisiennes (1928) as 'Armand de Marny'
- The Joker (1928) as 'Mr. Borwick'
- The Physician (1928) as 'Walter Amphiel'
- Balaclava (1928) as 'Captain Gardner'
- The First Born (1928) as 'Sir Hugo Boycott'
- Perjury (1929) as 'Adolf Sperber'
- The Crooked Billet (1929) as 'Guy Morrow'
- Loose Ends (1930) as 'Raymond Carteret'
- Murder! (1930) as 'Gordon Druce'
- Mary (1931) as 'Gordon Moore'
- The Missing Rembrandt (1932) as 'Claude Holford'
- Lily Christine (1932) as 'Ambatriadi'
- That Night in London (1932) as 'Harry Tresham'
- Bitter Sweet (1933) as 'Captain Auguste Lutte'
- Don Quixote (1933) as 'The Duke of Fallanga'
- Loyalties (1933) as 'Capt. Ronald Dancy, DSO'
- The Private Life of Henry VIII (1933) as 'Wriothesley'
- Matinee Idol (1933) as 'Harley Travers'
- The Four Masked Men (1934) as 'Rodney Fraser'
- The Battle (1934) as 'Feize'
- The Case for the Crown (1934) as 'James L. Barton'
- Death Drives Through (1935) as 'Garry Ames'
- Here's to Romance (1935) as 'Bert'
- The Three Musketeers (1935) as King Louis XIII
- The Flying Doctor (1936) as a spectator at boxing match (uncredited)
- Lloyd's of London (1936) as 'Jukes'
- Slave Ship (1937) as 'Corey'
- Wake Up and Live (1937) as 'James Stratton'
- Youth on Parole (1937) as 'Sparkler'
- Kidnapped (1938) as 'Ebenezer Balfour'
- The Mad Miss Manton (1938) as 'Mr. Fred Thomas'
- Suez (1938) as Benjamin Disraeli
- The Three Musketeers (1939) as Cardinal Richelieu
- The Little Princess (1939) as 'Lord Wickham'
- Wuthering Heights (1939) as 'Lockwood'
- Daredevils of the Red Circle (1939, serial) as 'Horace Granville'
- The Man in the Iron Mask (1939) as 'Aramis'
- Stanley and Livingstone (1939) as 'Sir John Gresham'
- Tower of London (1939) as King Henry VI
- The Earl of Chicago (1940) as the Attorney General (uncredited)
- Laddie (1940) as 'Mr. Charles Pryor'
- The House of the Seven Gables (1940) as 'Deacon Arnold Foster'
- Road to Singapore (1940) as 'Sir Malcolm Drake' (uncredited)
- Primrose Path (1940) as 'Homer Adams'
- Babies for Sale (1940) as 'Dr. Wallace Rankin'
- Captain Caution (1940) as 'Lt. Strope'
- South of Suez (1940) as 'Roger Smythe'
- Free and Easy (1941) as a solicitor (uncredited)
- Shadows on the Stairs (1941) as 'Tom Armitage'
- That Hamilton Woman (1941) as 'Lord Keith'
- They Met in Bombay (1941) as a doctor (uncredited)
- Dr. Kildare's Wedding Day (1941) as 'Dr. John F. Lockberg'
- Fly-By-Night (1942) as 'Prof. Langner'
- A Tragedy at Midnight (1942) as 'Dr Hilary Wilton'
- Captains of the Clouds (1942) as Winston Churchill (voice) (uncredited)
- To Be or Not to Be (1942) as 'Major Cunningham'
- Fingers at the Window (1942) as 'Dr. Kurt Immelman'
- This Above All (1942) as 'Major'
- Tarzan's New York Adventure (1942) as 'Portmaster'
- Mrs. Miniver (1942) as a German agent on the radio (voice) (uncredited)
- Somewhere I'll Find You (1942) as 'Floyd Kirsten' (uncredited)
- The War Against Mrs. Hadley (1942) as 'Doctor Leonard V. Meecham'
- Apache Trail (1942) as 'James V. Thorne'
- Lucky Jordan (1942) as 'Kilpatrick'
- Journey for Margaret (1942) in a minor role (uncredited)
- Secrets of the Underground (1942) as 'Paul Panois'
- Assignment in Brittany (1943) as 'Col. Herman Fournier'
- Five Graves to Cairo (1943) as 'Col. Fitzhume' (uncredited)
- First Comes Courage (1943) as 'Col. Wallace' (uncredited)
- Phantom of the Opera (1943) as 'Maurice Pleyel'
- Guadalcanal Diary (1943) as 'Weatherby' (uncredited)
- The Return of the Vampire (1943) as 'Sir Frederick Fleet'
- Madame Curie (1943) as a businessman (uncredited)
- Four Jills in a Jeep (1944) as 'Col. Hartley' (uncredited)
- The Story of Dr. Wassell (1944) as a man (uncredited)
- The White Cliffs of Dover (1944) as 'Major Loring' at hospital (uncredited)
- The Scarlet Claw (1944) as 'Judge Brisson'
- The Pearl of Death (1944) as 'Giles Conover'
- Enter Arsene Lupin (1944) as 'Charles Seagrave'
- Murder, My Sweet (1944) as 'Mr. Leuwen Grayle'
- The Picture of Dorian Gray (1945) as 'Sir Robert Bentley'
- The Brighton Strangler (1945) as 'Chief Inspector W.R. Allison'
- Crime Doctor's Warning (1945) as 'Frederick Malone'
- Week-End at the Waldorf (1945) as the British Secretary
- Confidential Agent (1945) as 'Mr. Brigstock'
- The Bandit of Sherwood Forest (1946) as 'Lord Warrick'
- The Walls Came Tumbling Down (1946) as 'Dr. Marko' (released posthumously)
- The Imperfect Lady (1947) as 'Mr. Rogan' (final film, released posthumously)

=== As director ===
- The Whistler (1926) short made by DeForest Phonofilm
- The Sheik of Araby (1926) short made by DeForest Phonofilm
- Knee Deep in Daisies (1926) short made by DeForest Phonofilm
- The Fair Maid of Perth (1926) short made by DeForest Phonofilm
- False Colours (1927) short made by DeForest Phonofilm
- The Sentence of Death (1927), short made by DeForest Phonofilm
- Packing Up (1927) short made by DeForest Phonofilm
- As We Lie (1927) short film made by DeForest Phonofilm
- The First Born (1928)
- The Woman Between (1931)
- Fascination (1931)
- Youthful Folly (1934)
- The Morals of Marcus (1935)
- The Flying Doctor (1936)

=== As writer ===
- Lovers in Araby (1924)
- As We Lie (1927) (story)
- The First Born (1928)
- The Woman Between (1931)
- L'Atlantide (1932) directed by G. W. Pabst
- The Lodger (1932)
- The Morals of Marcus (1935)
- The Flying Doctor (1936)

=== As producer ===
- The Man Without Desire (1923)
- The Shimmy Sheik (short) (1923)
- Two-chinned Chow (short) (1923)
- Yes, We Have No - ! (animated short) (1923)
- Crossing the Great Sagrada (short) (1924)
- Unnatural Life Studies (short) (1924)
- The Pathetic Gazette (short) (1924)
- Adam's Film Review (short) (1924)
- Lovers in Araby (1924)
- The First Born (1928)
- The Flying Doctor (1936)
- Watchtower Over Tomorrow (1945) (uncredited)

== Publications ==
- Lionel H. Mander (1925), Albania Today.
- Miles Mander (1927), Oasis, London: Hutchinson & Co.
- Miles Mander (1933), Gentleman By Birth, London: Hutchinson & Co.
- Miles Mander (1934), To My Son – In Confidence, Faber & Faber.

== Notes ==
A.Lionel Mander had three siblings, an older brother Geoffrey (born in March 1882), older sister Margery (born in June 1883) and a younger brother named Alan (born in January 1891). His older brother Geoffrey Mander became a Liberal Member of Parliament.

B.Mander's book of memoirs and advice, To My Son – in Confidence, was published in 1934. The book included "an outspoken attack" on British public schools, for which the headmaster of Harrow publicly rebuked the author.

C.Kathleen French was born in 1900 at Marrickville in Sydney, the daughter of William and Kathleen French. She was educated at Worthing in West Sussex, England.

D.The claim that Miles Mander died suddenly at the Brown Derby restaurant in Los Angeles, as stated in various websites, is not supported by the evidence. Contemporary newspaper and magazine reports, as cited in the above article, clearly state that Mander died at his Hollywood home of a heart condition. One of the reports specifies that he died "while he was asleep".
