= Joy Jobbins =

Australian writer (1927–2023)

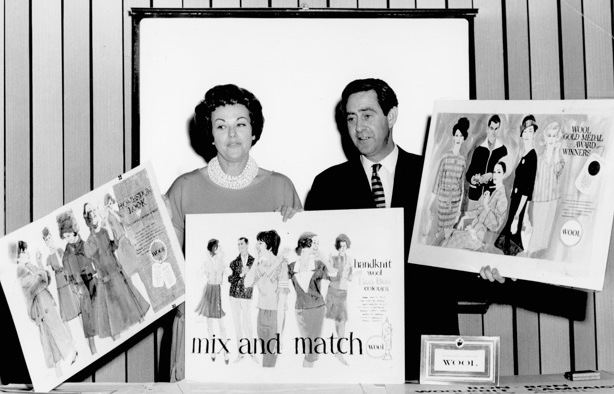
- Jobbins and Ralph Blunden in 1962
- Born: 5 September 1927; Sydney, Australia
- Died: 7 August 2023 (aged 95); Darlinghurst, Australia
- Occupations: Author, marketing executive

Joy Edna Jobbins (5 September 1927 – 7 August 2023) was an Australian writer and marketing executive. She was the head of advertising for The Australian Wool Board and wrote Shoestring: a memoir.

== Biography ==
Joy Edna Jobbins was born in Sydney on 5 September 1927. Her father was cinesound cameraman George Malcolm, a pioneer in the Australian film industry; her brother, Ken Malcolm, was also in the film industry, working variously as a sound recordist and editor.

Jobbins went to Bondi Public School, and later studied art at the East Sydney Tech College.

In 1950, she went to work at Anthony Horden's Department Store where she met, and later married Henry Edward Jobbins.

Jobbins worked as a script supervisor on the propaganda film "A Yank Down Under", about R&R leave in Sydney during World War II.

Jobbins subsequently modelled swim suits for Coles of California Swimwear (a New Zealand Company).

After she married, she moved to Eltham, Victoria where she went to work at Carden's Advertising, working on campaigns for Terylene, House of Leroy. Later she left and joined Ralph Blunden's agency where she took control of the Australian Wool Board account working in collaboration with models, photographers and illustrators such as Maggie Tabberer, Henry Talbot, Helmut Newton, Patrick Russell, Des O'Brien, Barbara Robertson and others.

In 1959, she played an important role in the inaugural Australian Fashion Awards.

Jobbins subsequently left Blunden Advertising and worked directly for the Australian Wool Board from 1964 until 1972 when she left to publish a tourism magazine called, "Australia for Players and Stayers.

Jobbins was the mother of comedian and writer Saturday Rosenberg, Camden Jobbins, and Sheridan Jobbins. She was also the stepmother of Cobbitty Jobbins and Boak Jobbins.

Joy Jobbins died in Darlinghurst on 7 August 2023, at the age of 95.
