= Motherland (1927 film) =

1927 film

- Directed by: G. B. Samuelson
- Produced by: G. B. Samuelson
- Starring: Rex Davis; Eva Moore; James Knight; Dorinea Shirley
- Cinematography: A. A. Tunwell
- Music by: W. L. Trytel
- Production company: Reciprocity Films
- Distributed by: Reciprocity Films
- Release date: October 1927
- Running time: 7,702 feet
- Country: United Kingdom
- Language: English

Motherland is a 1927 British silent war film directed by G. B. Samuelson and starring Rex Davis, Eva Moore and James Knight. The film was made at Isleworth Studios. It is set during the First World War. It aimed to copy the success of the series of war films released by British Instructional Films, but critical reaction was negative.

== Cast ==
- Rex Davis - The Lonely Soldier
- Eva Moore - Mrs. Edwards
- James Knight - Private Tom Edwards
- Dorinea Shirley - The Stranger
- Alec Alexander - Lance Corporal Ikey Abrahamson
- Peggy Carlisle - Betty
- Lena Halliday - Mrs. Vibart
- A. Harding Steerman - Alexander Vibart
- Russell Gorton - Captain Roger Vibart
- Marjorie Spiers - Grace Edwards
- Maurice Redstone - Issy Abrahamson

== Bibliography ==
- Low, Rachael. History of the British Film, 1918-1929. George Allen & Unwin, 1971.
