= Sheridan Jobbins =

Australian journalist, television presenter and screenwriter

- Jobbins at the premiere of Easy Virtue in Canada, 2008
- Born: Melbourne, Australia
- Occupations: Journalist, television presenter, screenwriter

Sheridan Jobbins is an Australian journalist, television presenter, and screenwriter.

== Early life ==
Jobbins was born in Melbourne, Australia. She was educated at Ascham School in Sydney. She is a third generation Australian film maker, whose family includes: grandfather, Cinesound cinematographer George Malcolm; parents, advertising executives Harry & Joy Jobbins; sister, comedian/writer Saturday Rosenberg; and uncle, sound recordist Ken Malcolm. At the age of 9, she presented a televisions series called Cooking with Sheri on ATN 7. The show ran from 1967 – 1969. She was later credited by Guinness World Records as being the world's youngest television host. A record that stood until 2006.

Cooking with Sheri production still

== Career ==
In the late 1970s, she had a brief career as an actor in Australian soap operas, making a featured appearance in Glenview High, and smaller roles in The Restless Years and The Young Doctors. From 1981 – 1984 Sheridan was a reporter on the multi-award-winning children's television programme, Simon Townsend's Wonder World! (screened on Network 10.) Other on screen television credits include being a reporter on State of the Arts (later, Billboard) on the ABC, and Good Morning Australia – Network 10.

In 1994, she hosted a 13 × 1 hour television series, House of Fun, also for Network 10. Jobbins is a member of both the Australian and American Writers Guilds.

She writes full-time with Australian film director/writer, Stephan Elliott. Their most recent credit is the feature film Easy Virtue, starring Colin Firth, Kristin Scott Thomas, Jessica Biel and Ben Barnes. Based on a stage play of the same name by Noël Coward, Easy Virtue premiered at the Toronto Film Festival, and has screened at the Rome and London film festivals to great acclaim.

Jobbins is a regular contributor to the Australian Broadcasting Corporation's website Unleashed.

=== Producer ===
From 1985 – 86, Jobbins joined friend, Amanda Keller, to produce music videos for Australian bands including; Mental As Anything (Live It Up), Mondo Rock (Modern Bop), and Cold Chisel (Flame Trees). She appears in audience of the Live It Up music video.

She also wrote, produced and directed several short films, two of which Machinations (1987) won a bronze medal at the New York Film & Television Festival, and I Am Time was a finalist in the Dendy Awards, which opened the Sydney Film Festival in 1993.

From 1993 until 2000, she was a director of Rebel Penfold-Russell's company, Latent Image Productions. She was in charge of research and development of the company's on-going production slate. In that time, Latent Image produced the multi award-winning feature films, The Adventures of Priscilla, Queen of the Desert, Paws and WillFull.

A short film Jobbin wrote for Latent Image, Alex's Party, screened at the Palm Springs International Festival of Short Films 2006, and Flickerfest 2007.

=== Screenwriter ===
Jobbins writes screenplays full-time with writer/director Stephan Elliott.

The screenplay; Easy Virtue adapted from a stageplay of the same name by Noël Coward has been produced by Barnaby Thompson for Fragile Films and Ealing Studios under the direction of Stephan Elliott.

Jobbins has blogged about scriptwriting under the name Script Whisperer, and in 2012 was cameo contributor to Script Frenzy.
