= Dorinea Shirley =

British actress (1899–1973)

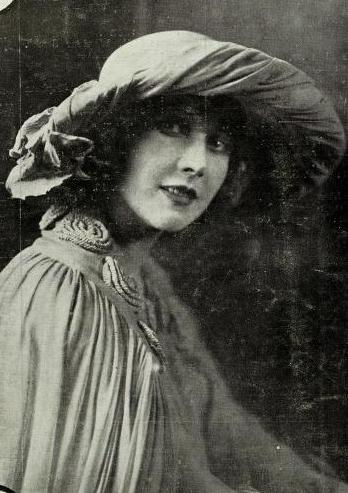
Dorinea Shirley, from a 1922 publication.

Dorinea Shirley (1 April 1899 – 3 July 1973) was a British film actress of the silent era.

== Selected filmography ==
- Open Country (1922)
- Petticoat Loose (1922)
- The Call of the East (1922)
- Greywater Park (1924)
- Claude Duval (1926)
- Nell Gwyn (1926)
- Motherland (1927)
- Afterwards (1928)
- Zero (1928)
