= Half a Truth =

1922 film

- Directed by: Sinclair Hill
- Written by: Rita (novel); Leslie Howard Gordon
- Starring: Margaret Hope; Lawford Davidson; Miles Mander
- Production company: Stoll Pictures
- Distributed by: Stoll Pictures
- Release date: June 1922
- Country: United Kingdom
- Languages: Silent; English intertitles

Half a Truth is a 1922 British silent crime film directed by Sinclair Hill and starring Margaret Hope, Lawford Davidson and Miles Mander. It was based on a 1911 novel by Eliza Humphreys writing as Rita.

== Cast ==
- Margaret Hope as Virginia
- Lawford Davidson as Chris Kennaway
- Miles Mander as Marquis Sallast
- Norma Whalley as Lady Lucille Altamont
- Irene Rooke as Octavia Madison
- Percy Standing as Sir Richard Madison
- Phillip Simmons as Barry Connell
- Stella Wood-Sims as Doreen Madison

== Bibliography ==
- Murphy, Robert. Directors in British and Irish Cinema: A Reference Companion. BFI, 2006. ISBN 978-1844571260
