= Walter Murton =

British art director

- Born: 1892; Norwich, Norfolk; United Kingdom
- Other name: Walter William Murton
- Occupation: Art Director
- Years active: 1922-1943 (film)

Walter Murton was a British art director, who worked from the 1920s until the 1940s. During his early career in the 1920s Murton was the regular set designer on the silent film series The Further Adventures of Sherlock Holmes and The Mystery of Dr. Fu Manchu.

Along with Clifford Pember, Murton was identified as part of an "old guard" resisting change in British set design sought by younger set designers and by German immigrants. During his later career Murton worked for Gainsborough Pictures. His final film was the influential Gainsborough Melodrama The Man in Grey (1943). His son Peter Murton was also an art director.

== Selected filmography ==
- Open Country (1922)
- The Truants (1922)
- Petticoat Loose (1922)
- The Glorious Adventure (1922)
- The Indian Love Lyrics (1923)
- The Kensington Mystery (1924)
- Becket (1924)
- The Conspirators (1924)
- Huntingtower (1928)
- A Warm Corner (1930)
- The Sport of Kings (1931)
- Third Time Lucky (1931)
- The Ghost Train (1931)
- The Great Barrier (1937)
- Second Best Bed (1938)
- Strange Boarders (1938)
- Climbing High (1938)
- Hi Gang! (1941)
- We Dive at Dawn (1943)
- The Man in Grey (1943)

== Bibliography ==
- Bergfelder, Tim & Cargnelli, Christian. Destination London: German-speaking emigrés and British cinema, 1925-1950. Berghahn Books, 2008.
