= Petticoat Loose =

1922 film

- Directed by: George Ridgwell
- Written by: Sinclair Hill
- Based on: Petticoat Loose by Eliza Humphreys
- Starring: Dorinea Shirley; Warwick Ward; Lionelle Howard
- Cinematography: Jack E. Cox
- Production company: Stoll Pictures
- Distributed by: Stoll Pictures
- Release date: 1922
- Running time: 64 minutes
- Country: United Kingdom
- Languages: Silent; English intertitles

Petticoat Loose is a 1922 British silent drama film directed by George Ridgwell and starring Dorinea Shirley, Warwick Ward and Lionelle Howard. It is based on the 1898 novel of the same title by Eliza Humphreys about a playwright who hypnotises the woman he loves, controlling and ruining her life.

It was made by Stoll Pictures at the company's Cricklewood Studios in London. The film's sets were designed by the art director Walter W. Murton. Location shooting took place in Cornwall.

== Cast ==
- Dorinea Shirley as Brianna Lynch
- Warwick Ward as Ralmere Clive
- Lionelle Howard as Mickey Croome
- Jack Trevor as Max Lorraine
- Margaret Hope as Ray St. Vincent
- Kate Gurney as Sally Dunne
- Frank Goldsmith as Lord Farlingham
- Madame d'Esterre as Lady Kilmurran
- Sunday Wilshin as Nurse
- Colin Bell as Maid

== Bibliography ==
- Goble, Alan. The Complete Index to Literary Sources in Film. Walter de Gruyter, 1999.
- Palmer, Scott. British Film Actors' Credits, 1895-1987. McFarland, 1988.
- Hunter, I.Q., Porter, Laraine & Smith, Justin. The Routledge Companion to British Cinema History. Taylor & Francis, 2017.
