= The Minpins =

1991 children's book by Roald Dahl

- First edition
- Author: Roald Dahl
- Audio read by: Bill Bailey
- Illustrator: Patrick Benson (original); Quentin Blake
- Language: English
- Genre: Children's novel
- Publisher: Jonathan Cape
- Publication date: 1991
- Publication place: United Kingdom
- Media type: Print (Hardback & Paperback)
- Pages: 47
- ISBN: 0-224-02899-5 (hardcover, 1991)
- OCLC: 60045884

The Minpins is a novel by Roald Dahl with illustrations by Patrick Benson. It was published in 1991, shortly after Dahl's death in November 1990, and is the author's final work of literature. The book was republished in 2017 under the title Billy and the Minpins with new illustrations by Dahl's primary illustrator, Quentin Blake.

== Synopsis ==
Little Billy is forbidden by his mother to do a lot of things, including entering the Forest of Sin behind his house. She tells him of the Whangdoodles, Hornswogglers, Snozzwangers and Vermicious Knids (creatures first mentioned in Charlie and the Chocolate Factory and Charlie and the Great Glass Elevator) that live in the forest. Worst of all is the Terrible Blood-Suckling Tooth-Pluckling Stone-Chuckling Spittler, who chases his prey while clouds of hot red smoke pour out of his nose, and then swallows them up in one gulp. Little Billy doesn't believe his mother, and the Devil whispers to Little Billy that the monsters don't exist and that there is a plethora of luscious wild strawberries in the forest. Soon, Little Billy is walking through the forest when he hears something coming after him, and runs to escape it. As he looks back, he sees puffs of orange-red smoke catching up with him.

He escapes, what he is sure must be, the Spittler by climbing up a tree as high and as fast as he can. When he comes to rest, he notices windows opening all over the branches, and discovers a whole city of little people, the Minpins, living inside the tree. The leader of the Minpins, Don Mini, tells Little Billy that the monster waiting under the tree is not the Spittler (which the Minpins have never heard of), but the Red-Hot Smoke-Belching Gruncher, who grunches up everything in the forest. It seems that there is no way for Little Billy to safely get down from the tree and return home.

Upon learning of the close friendship between the Minpins and birds, Little Billy devises a plan to rid the forest of the Gruncher; the former flies on the back of a swan and uses his scent to lure the Gruncher into a lake. The water of the lake puts out the fire in the Gruncher's belly, killing him. The Minpins are grateful to Little Billy for ridding the forest of their tormentor. They reward him by sending the swan to serve as Little Billy's own personal transport every night, which he uses to explore the world and to continue his newfound friendship with the Minpins.

== Editions ==
- ISBN 0-14-138745-9 (audio CD, read by Bill Bailey, 2023)
- ISBN 0-59-311342-X (paperback, 2019)
