= Whangdoodle =

A fanciful being whose undefined appearance and essence is left to imagination

The Whangdoodle is a fanciful or humorous being whose undefined appearance and essence is left to individual imagination. Other connotations may include an object of humor, something noisy but of no consequence and insignificant.

== 19th century usage ==
It appeared in 1858 as a title for and text within a parody sermon "Where the lion roareth and the wang-doodle mourneth," published in Samuel Putnam Avery's The Harp of a Thousand Strings: Or, Laughter for a Lifetime. Possibly due to its resemblance to or formation from existing words whang (Note: ":a loud sharp vibrant or resonant sound") and doodle, (Note: ":an aimless or casual scribble, design, or sketch; also : a minor work") it soon became common to spell it as whangdoodle. The term appeared derisively in 1859 correspondence published in The Cincinnati Lancet & Observer. Mark Twain used it disparagingly in a letter in 1862. By 1877 it had been included in a dictionary.

Whangdoodle. A humorously imaginary creature, whose precise nature, form, and attributes are left to everyone's individual fancy.

Where the lion roareth and the whangdoodle mourneth for her first born. — The Harp of a Thousand Strings.

— Bartlett, John Russell (1877). Dictionary of Americanisms : a glossary of words and phrases usually regarded as peculiar to the United States. Boston; Cambridge: Little, Brown, and Company; Press of John Wilson & Son. p. 745. hdl:2027/nyp.33433069243867. OCLC 669372713.

== 20th century usage ==
The 1911 Encyclopædia Britannica listed this definition in the Poker article:

Whangdoodle
Compulsory round of jack-pots, usually agreed upon to follow a very large hand.

== 20th century literature ==
In children's literature by British authors Roald Dahl and Julie Andrews, a whangdoodle is portrayed as dismayed and discontent, or a creature of sorrow.

=== Roald Dahl books ===
The Minpins

One of the main characters is warned by his mother against a forest where Whangdoodles and other monsters live (though the only monster he does meet there is the Gruncher).

James and the Giant Peach

One of the firemen in New York City refers to the centipede as a Whangdoodle.

Charlie and the Chocolate Factory

Willy Wonka mentions that he saved the Oompa Loompas from being preyed upon by Whangdoodles and various other monsters. Whangdoodles are described as particularly "terrible" and "wicked".

Charlie and the Great Glass Elevator

One of the ingredients for Wonka-Vite is "the hide (and the seek) of a spotted Whangdoodle".

=== The Last of the Really Great Whangdoodles ===
A different Whangdoodle is described in the children's novel The Last of the Really Great Whangdoodles by singer and actress Dame Julie Andrews (under her married name of Julie Edwards): an intelligent, ungulate-like character capable of changing color to suit its emotions or blend into its surroundings, from whose hind legs grow a new and different set of bedroom slippers each year. It is introduced to the protagonists Ben, Tom, and Lindy, and thus to the reader, by the geneticist 'Professor Savant', a scholar of the Whangdoodle and its secret domain. Attempting to visit both, the scientist and children are opposed by the antagonist 'Prock' (the Whangdoodle's second-in-command), until his resources are exhausted by their tenacity. With Prock persuaded to grant their passage, the children discover that the Whangdoodle is oppressed by want of a mate, and convince Savant to create the latter. With this done, the two Whangdoodles are to be wedded at a great celebration, and the children return to their home.

=== The Big Rock Candy Mountain ===
Some versions of the song "The Big Rock Candy Mountain" include a mention of a Whangdoodle singing in the titular hobo's paradise. This is the case in the version written down and arranged by Charles and Ruth Seeger. This version is used in the Frederic Rzewski composition for violin, piano, and percussion, titled "Whangdoodles".
