= Fort George railway station =

Former railway station in Scotland

Coordinates: 57.567386°N 4.033806°W

Fort George
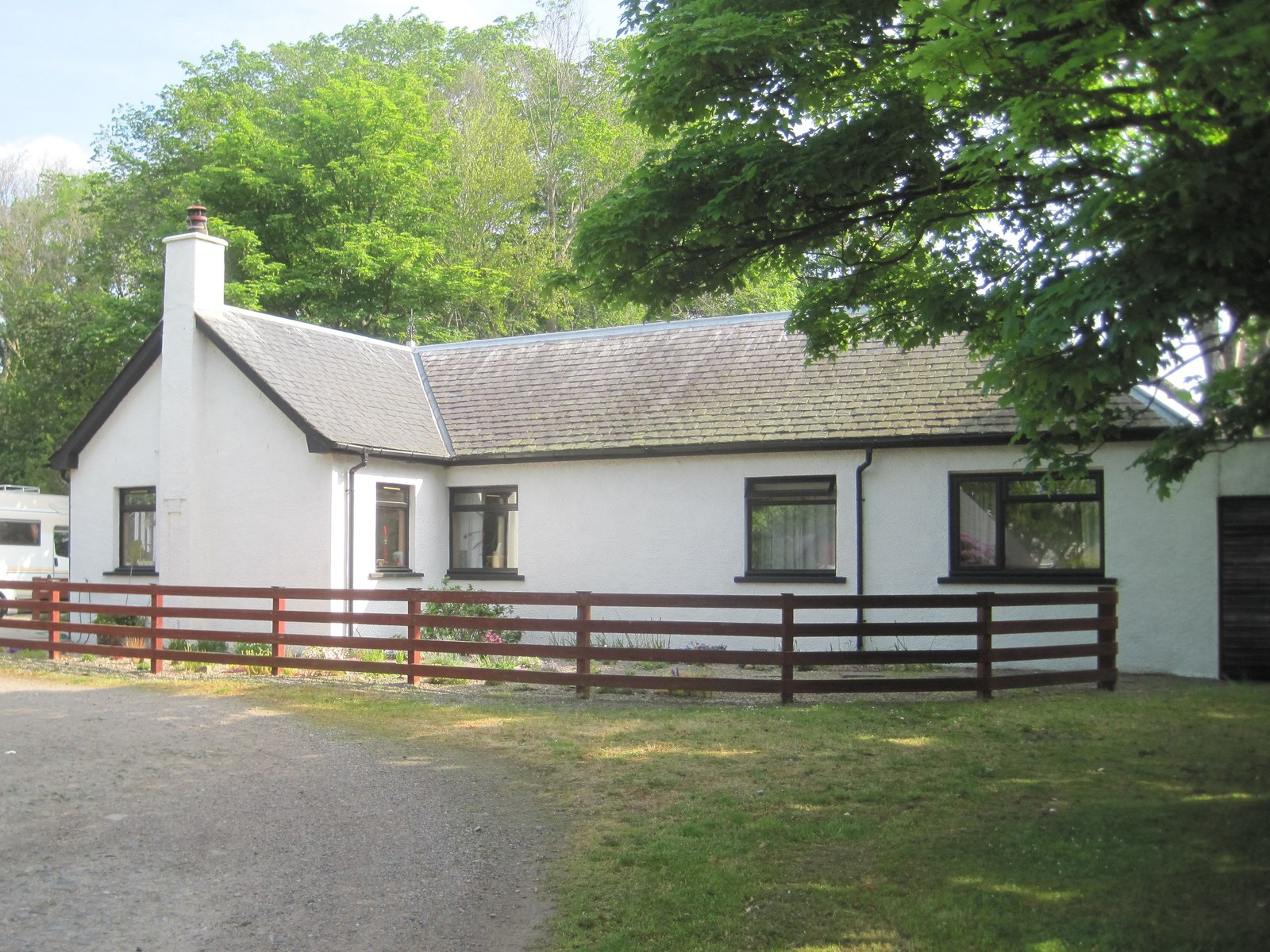
- The site of the station in 2017

General information
- Location: Highland; Scotland
- Platforms: 1

Other information
- Status: Disused

History
- Original company: Highland Railway
- Pre-grouping: Highland Railway
- Post-grouping: London, Midland and Scottish Railway

Key dates
- 1 July 1899: Opened
- 5 April 1943: Closed to passengers
- 11 August 1958: Closed for freight
Location

Fort George was a railway station at Ardersier, Highland, to the west of Nairn, Scotland, (now in the Highland Council Area).

Preceding station	Disused railways	Following station
Gollanfield Junction; Line and station closed	Highland Railway; Fort George branch	Terminus
