= Gollanfield =

Coordinates: 57.555°N 3.991°W

Gollanfield is a village on the A96 road between Inverness and Nairn, in the Highland Council Area, Scotland.

For 110 years, the village had a station on the railway between Inverness and Elgin. The original station opened in 1855 and was sited further west than the second station (opened in 1899) which was just east of the B9006 road. The station was moved so that it could be the junction site for a small railway to Ardersier (Fort George). The station was closed in May 1965, but the railway is still open.
