= Easy Virtue (2008 film) =

2008 British romantic comedy film by Stephan Elliott

- Theatrical release poster
- Directed by: Stephan Elliott
- Written by: Stephan Elliott; Sheridan Jobbins
- Based on: Easy Virtue by Noël Coward
- Produced by: Barnaby Thompson; Joseph Abrams; James D. Stern
- Starring: Jessica Biel; Colin Firth; Kristin Scott Thomas; Ben Barnes
- Cinematography: Martin Kenzie
- Edited by: Sue Blainey
- Music by: Marius de Vries
- Production companies: Ealing Studios; Endgame Entertainment; Odyssey Entertainment; BBC Films; Fragile Films; Joe Abrams Productions; Prescience Film Partnerships
- Distributed by: Pathé Distribution (United Kingdom); Sony Pictures Classics (United States)
- Release dates: 8 September 2008 (TIFF); 7 November 2008 (United Kingdom); 22 May 2009 (United States)
- Running time: 97 minutes
- Countries: United Kingdom; United States
- Languages: English; French
- Box office: $18.4 million

Easy Virtue is a 2008 romantic comedy film based on Noël Coward's play of the same name. The play was previously adapted as the silent movie Easy Virtue (1928) by Alfred Hitchcock. The current adaptation is directed by Stephan Elliott, and is written by Elliott and Sheridan Jobbins. It stars Jessica Biel, Ben Barnes, Colin Firth and Kristin Scott Thomas. The score contains many Coward and jazz-age songs, some of which are sung or partially sung by the cast.

Easy Virtue is a social comedy in which a glamorous American widow, Larita, meets and impetuously marries a young Englishman, John Whittaker, at the Monaco Grand Prix. When they return to England, his mother takes an immediate and strong dislike to her daughter-in-law, while his father finds a kindred spirit. Family tensions escalate.

The film was screened at the Toronto International Film Festival and London Film Festival prior to its 7 November release by Pathé in the UK. Subsequently, the film was also screened at the Rio International Film Festival, Middle East International Film Festival in Abu Dhabi, and the Rome Film Festival. It closed the Adelaide Film Festival prior to the Australian theatrical release on 12 March 2009.

== Plot ==
Set in the early 1930s, Larita meets John Whittaker in Monaco. They marry and he takes his bride to the family mansion near Flintham in rural Nottinghamshire to meet his parents, Veronica and Major Jim Whittaker, and his two sisters, Hilda and Marion. Veronica, already predisposed to dislike her new daughter-in-law, is further disappointed to find that Larita is American and, like Jim, speaks fluent French. Larita also meets John's former girlfriend and neighbour Sarah Hurst, who is gracious about the marriage.

Larita makes some inadvertent gaffes, accidentally killing the family chihuahua and giving some joking advice to Hilda that results in embarrassment to, and enmity from, the sisters. Sarah comes to the Whittakers' parties, and to play tennis, accompanied by her brother Philip, on whom Hilda has a crush. Philip, however, is infatuated with Larita, which further angers Hilda.

Larita reveals she has been previously married and remains calm in the face of her mother-in-law's disdain. To Larita's disappointment, John is not eager to leave the estate so that they can find a home of their own. Larita is bored and miserable in the countryside and hates blood sports like hunting, and any of the entertainment that country English people seem to enjoy. She reads Lady Chatterley's Lover, shocking the female relatives, and she will not play tennis. She dislikes Veronica's stuffy decor, her constant entertaining of her friends, and the overcooked food. She tries to get along with Veronica, who refuses to accept her and resents her attempts to bring American traditions into the home.

Veronica and her hunting party discover John and Larita having sex in an outbuilding. Larita becomes increasingly isolated and demoralized by her mother-in-law's derision, verbal attacks and dirty tricks. Apart from Jim, Larita's only friends are the servants, whom she treats better than Veronica does. Larita retreats to Jim's workshop to work on his motorcycle. Still troubled from having lost all his men in the Great War, Jim has lost interest in the estate. Any love between him and his wife has long since disappeared. The Whittakers have fallen on hard times. John loses his independence and seems immature as he is drawn into family life. John's affection for Larita seems to be waning, as he complains about his wife to Sarah, who finds his behavior inappropriate.

Hilda receives a newspaper cutting from her uncle in America revealing information about Larita's first husband, an older man dying of cancer. Veronica and her daughters assume that Larita had married her first husband for his money, and even imply she killed him. John withdraws from Larita, while Jim scolds his daughters for their cruelty. Larita explains that she loved her first husband and helped him to die on his own terms and end his suffering.

At Veronica's Christmas party, John refuses to dance with Larita, so Jim dances a tango with her. She determines to leave the marriage and, on her way out of the mansion, she apologises to Sarah for having interrupted her relationship with John. She hopes that Sarah will take John back.

Veronica and her daughters confront Larita one last time, and an argument ensues in which Veronica and Larita trade barbs, and Larita advises the daughters to leave and see the world, in their own eyes, while they still can.

Larita destroys a large statue as she leaves the house, with a heartbroken John looking on. Her father-in-law Jim departs with her in her car and the butler wishes them both well.

== Cast ==
- Jessica Biel as Larita Whittaker
- Ben Barnes as John Whittaker
- Colin Firth as Jim Whittaker
- Kristin Scott Thomas as Veronica Whittaker
- Kimberley Nixon as Hilda Whittaker
- Katherine Parkinson as Marion Whittaker
- Kris Marshall as Furber
- Christian Brassington as Philip Hurst
- Charlotte Riley as Sarah Hurst
- Jim McManus as Jackson
- Pip Torrens as Lord Hurst
- Georgie Glen as Mrs. Langridon
- Stephan Elliott and Sheridan Jobbins (uncredited) as party guests

== Production ==
=== Writing ===
Coward's play was adapted to the screen by Stephan Elliott and Sheridan Jobbins but hardly any feature of the original play remains besides the main characters, and even they do not greatly resemble Coward's cast.

In his autobiography, Present Indicative published in 1937, Coward describes his object in the play as being "to compare the déclassée woman of to-day with the more flamboyant demi-mondaine of the 1890s." He goes on to say, "The line that was intended to establish the play on a basis of comedy rather than tragedy, comes at the end of the second act when Larita, the heroine, irritated beyond endurance by the smug attitude of her 'in-laws', argues them out of the room."

Although the play was made into a silent film in 1928, directed by Alfred Hitchcock and starring Isabel Jeans and Franklin Dyall, this film is not mentioned in Coward's autobiography. The 2008 version of the film is favourably reviewed by the Noël Coward Society.

=== Directing ===
Filmmaker Stephan Elliott instructed Kristin Scott Thomas to play Mrs. Whittaker as a "mustache-twirling... Disney witch." Initially, the actress responded by suggesting this was the worst direction she had ever received, but later embraced her character's wickedness and somewhat haggard appearance and unflattering wardrobe.

=== Shooting ===
The film was shot in studio at the Ealing Studios in London, and on location at:

- Flintham Hall, Flintham, Nottinghamshire (Whittaker estate)
- Wimpole Hall, Cambridgeshire (Hurst estate)
- Englefield House, Berkshire (Monte Carlo)

== Soundtrack ==
The score for the film was produced by Marius de Vries and the film's director Stephan Elliott. It features several songs by Cole Porter and Noël Coward. It was performed by the Easy Virtue Orchestra—which was assembled specifically for the film. Jessica Biel makes her musical debut singing two tracks which are featured on the soundtrack album. Ben Barnes sings several songs on the sound track, including "Room with a View", while Colin Firth makes a guest appearance on the closing track.

Featured in the closing credits is a cover version, in 1920s faux-jazz style, of "When the Going Gets Tough, the Tough Get Going" (c. 1986), performed by Colin Firth, Ben Barnes, Jessica Biel, and Andy Caine. The song was written by Billy Ocean, Robert John "Mutt" Lange, Wayne Brathwaite, and Barry Eastmond. The British jazz renditions of the songs "Car Wash" and "Sex Bomb" were also included. A soundtrack album was released on 3 November 2008 in stores and on iTunes.

== Reception ==
=== Critical response ===
Review aggregation website Rotten Tomatoes gives the film a 52% approval rating based on 125 reviews. Metacritic gives the film a score of 58% based on reviews from 28 critics.

Colm Andrew of the Manx Independent gave the film 7/10 and said it was "a frothy affair but the source material is good—the script is workmanlike but at least it doesn't try to be clever and the quality of the acting makes sure the lines resonate soundly". Some critics felt that the movie's insistent jazz-age lilt is ultimately at odds with a play written in 1924 that attacks the hypocrisy, smugness and benighted values of the English landed gentry between the wars. The screenplay includes scattered Coward bons mots, but the witticisms do not come as thick or as fast as in his later plays.

Broadsheet and national British reviews were generally mixed or negative. Film Four's praised the casting of Biel and noted that, though Firth's and Thomas's casting was "hardly radical thinking, both offer something different from their previous period work". Philip French of the Observer wrote that the film was "well enough designed and photographed, but witless, anachronistic, cloth-eared, lacking in both style and period sense", while Peter Bradshaw of The Guardian attacked its script for "undermin[ing] the material by slipping arch modern phrases and gags into everyone's mouths". The critic of the Times awarded it only one star out of five, whilst Nicholas Barber of the Independent wrote that "every one of Elliott's straining efforts to turn Easy Virtue into a zany, risqué farce only makes it seems stuffier and starchier". Stella Papamichael of digital spy added that British jazz renditions of "Car Wash" and "Sex Bomb" used in the film were totally distracting.

=== Box office ===
The film earned US$18,463,608 worldwide. It was released in the US in May 2009, where it enjoyed some commercial success. Sony Pictures Classics paid an estimated US$1 million to acquire the film's distribution rights in the US, Latin America and South Africa. The film went on to gross US$2,656,784 in limited theatrical release in the North America.
