= Easy Virtue (1928 film) =

1928 film

- Easy Virtue trade magazine advert
- Directed by: Alfred Hitchcock
- Written by: Eliot Stannard
- Based on: Easy Virtue by Noël Coward
- Produced by: Uncredited: Michael Balcon; C. M. Woolf
- Starring: Isabel Jeans; Franklin Dyall; Eric Bransby Williams; Ian Hunter
- Cinematography: Claude L. McDonnell
- Edited by: Ivor Montagu
- Production company: Gainsborough Pictures
- Distributed by: Woolf & Freedman Film Service (UK); Sono Art-World Wide Pictures (US)
- Release date: 5 March 1928
- Running time: 70 minutes (2012 restoration)
- Country: United Kingdom
- Languages: Silent film English intertitles

Easy Virtue is a 1928 British silent romance film directed by Alfred Hitchcock and starring Isabel Jeans, Franklin Dyall and Ian Hunter.

The movie is loosely based on the 1924 play Easy Virtue by Noël Coward. It was made at the Islington Studios in London. The film's art direction is by Clifford Pember.

== Plot ==
Easy Virtue (1928)

'Virtue is its own reward' they say — but 'easy virtue' is society's reward for a slandered reputation.

In 1926, Larita Filton testifies at her divorce. In a flashback, her husband, a drunken brute named Aubrey Filton, is getting drunk in an artist's studio, as Mrs. Filton's portrait is being painted. The painter, Claude Robson, is smitten with Larita. He sends her a letter asking her to leave the physically abusive Mr. Filton, and marry him. She rejects Claude's advances and is pushing him away when Aubrey walks in on them. She appears to be embracing Claude. Aubrey confronts Claude. Claude fires a gun, but misses Aubrey. Aubrey begins to beat Claude severely with his walking cane. In the struggle, Claude shoots Aubrey. Two servants enter and, seeing Claude with the gun, run for the police. The police are seen kneeling over Claude's lifeless body. Larita is holding her wounded husband lovingly in her lap. He picks up the letter from Claude.

Aubrey files for divorce on the grounds of adultery. The jury rejects Larita's testimony and instead decides in Aubrey's favour, in large part because Larita is attractive, and Claude had written a will leaving her his entire fortune "to another man's wife!" As Larita leaves the courtroom, she hides her face from photographers trying to take her picture.

Larita leaves for the French Riviera to avoid continued unwanted attention. As she registers at the hotel, she remembers all the media frenzy around her, and at the last second, changes the name she registers under to "Larita Grey".

She lives there happily and anonymously. One day, at a tennis match, she is struck in the eye by the tennis ball of a rich younger man, John Whittaker. He apologises profusely and takes her for medical treatment. He soon asks Larita to marry him. She protests that surely he must want to know more about her first. He responds that all he need know is that he loves her. They marry and return to England to meet his family. While John's father likes Larita very much, his mother strongly disapproves even before meeting her. John's mother believes she recognises Larita, but cannot place her. She questions John about Larita and chastises him for marrying someone about whom he knows nothing. John begs his mother to be kind to her for his sake. However, she is only kind to Larita in public. Privately, she tries to turn everyone against Larita.

As John's mother continues to make her life miserable, Larita begs John to return to the South of France where they were happy. He asks why she cannot be happy in England. She tells him his family hates her, and that they are teaching him to hate her too. Later that day, John admits to his old girlfriend that his mother has helped him see that he made a huge mistake marrying Larita. Unknown to him, Larita overhears him.

John's sister sees Larita's picture in the papers. In the caption, Larita is identified as the former Mrs. Filton. John's sister shows her mother the picture. Mrs. Whittaker confronts Larita in front of the family, stating, "In our world, we do not understand this code of easy virtue", as she thrusts the magazine under Larita's nose. Larita responds that indeed they do not understand much of anything.

Mrs. Whittaker, fearing scandal and gossip about her family, tries to intimidate Larita into staying in her room during the party the family is hosting that same evening. Instead, Larita makes a grand entrance. However, Larita confides to a friend that she will leave John so he can obtain a divorce. Before leaving, she tells the old girlfriend, Sarah, whom his mother had thought a suitable match for John, and who has been quite kind to her, "Sarah - YOU ought to have married John."

Larita sits anonymously in the court gallery, weeping, as she watches John's uncontested divorce. A reporter recognises her. As she exits the court, photographers are waiting for her. This time, she does not flee. Instead, she exclaims to the throng of photographers, "Shoot! There's nothing left to kill."

== Cast ==
- Isabel Jeans as Larita Filton
- Robin Irvine as John Whittaker
- Franklin Dyall as Aubrey Filton
- Eric Bransby Williams as Claude Robson
- Ian Hunter as The plaintiff's counsel Mr. Greene
- Violet Farebrother as Mrs. Whittaker
- Frank Elliott as Colonel Whittaker
- Dacia Deane as Marion Whittaker
- Dorothy Boyd as Hilda Whittaker
- Enid Stamp Taylor as Sarah
- Benita Hume as telephone receptionist (uncredited)

Alfred Hitchcock's cameo is a signature occurrence in almost all of Hitchcock's films. About 21 minutes into the film he can be seen walking past a tennis court carrying a walking stick.

== Reception ==
The film was a financial failure.

== Preservation status and home media ==
A restoration of Easy Virtue was completed in 2012 as part of the BFI's £2 million "Save the Hitchcock 9" project to restore all of the director's surviving silent films.

As of October 2018, the restored version only has appeared on DVD and Blu-ray from Elephant Films in France.

On 1 January 2024, Easy Virtue entered the public domain in the United States.

== See also ==
- Easy Virtue (2008) – remake of the same play
