= Stephan Elliott =

Australian film director (born 1964)

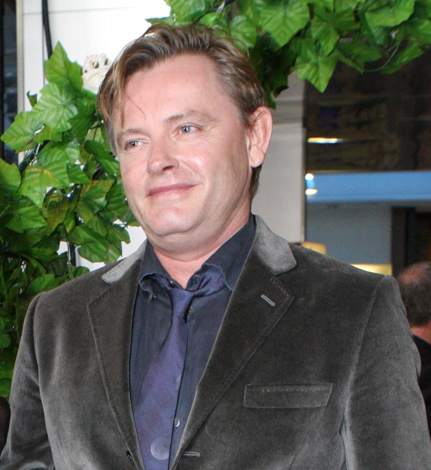
- Stephan Elliott at the premiere of his film A Few Best Men in 2012
- Born: 27 August 1964 (age 62); Sydney, New South Wales, Australia
- Occupations: Director, screenwriter
- Years active: 1992–present
- Partner: Wil Bevolley

Stephan Elliott (born 27 August 1964) is an Australian film director and screenwriter. His best-known film internationally is The Adventures of Priscilla, Queen of the Desert (1994).

== Career ==
Elliott began his career as an assistant director working in the Australian film industry in the 1980s.

His first two feature films, Frauds (starring musician Phil Collins) and The Adventures of Priscilla, Queen of the Desert, along with his shorter films Fast and The Agreement were produced by Rebel Penfold-Russell's Australian production company Latent Image Productions.

Frauds, The Adventures of Priscilla, Queen of the Desert and Welcome to Woop Woop were all officially selected to screen at the Cannes Film Festival, with "Priscilla" winning the Prix du public as well as an Academy Award for Best Costume Design.

In 2004 Elliott had a skiing accident and was hospitalised for several months. He said the accident caused him to rediscover his sense of humour.

His film Easy Virtue, co-written with Sheridan Jobbins, is based on the Noël Coward play of the same name. It stars Colin Firth, Kristin Scott Thomas, Jessica Biel and Ben Barnes and was produced by Barnaby Thompson for Ealing Studios in the UK, and premiered at the Toronto International Film Festival on 8 September 2008. It has also screened in the Rio Film Festival, Rome Film Festival and London Film Festival.

His next film, A Few Best Men starring Xavier Samuel and Olivia Newton-John was released in 2012.

He also wrote the script for the stage play of Priscilla, which premiered in 2007 at Sydney's Lyric Theatre in Star City.

== Personal life ==
Elliott came out as gay during his presentation at the inaugural AACTA Awards in Sydney on 31 January 2012. He has been in a relationship with his partner, Wil Bevolley, since the late 1980s. They had a civil partnership ceremony in London in 2008.

== Filmography ==
- Frauds (1993)
- The Adventures of Priscilla, Queen of the Desert (1994)
- Welcome to Woop Woop (1997)
- Eye of the Beholder (1999)
- Easy Virtue (2008)
- A Few Best Men (2011)
- Rio, I Love You, fourth segment: "I Think I'm in Love" (2014)
- Swinging Safari (2018)
- Priscilla Queen of the Desert 2 (TBA)
