= The Woman Between (1931 British film) =

1931 film

- Directed by: Miles Mander
- Written by: Miles Mander; Frank Launder
- Based on: Conflict by Miles Malleson
- Produced by: John Maxwell
- Starring: Owen Nares; Adrianne Allen; David Hawthorne
- Cinematography: Heinrich Gartner
- Edited by: Walter Stokvis
- Production company: British International Pictures
- Distributed by: Wardour Films
- Release date: 22 January 1931
- Running time: 89 minutes
- Country: United Kingdom
- Language: English

The Woman Between (also known as The Woman Decides) is a 1931 British drama film directed by Miles Mander and starring Owen Nares, Adrianne Allen and David Hawthorne. It was written by Mander and Frank Launder adapted from Miles Malleson's 1925 play Conflict, and made at Elstree Studios by British International Pictures.

The film is notable for its sexual and political content which has been attributed to a brief period of relaxation in oversight by the BBFC. It was one three similarly themed films which Allen appeared in at the time including Loose Ends (1930) and The Stronger Sex (1931).

== Premise ==
An aristocratic young woman becomes romantically torn between two men, once friends at University, who stand for the Conservative Party and Labour Party in an election. Both have murky recent pasts, one having been a petty thief and the other had lived outside of marriage with the heroine. Her father is left bemused by the morals of the younger generation.

== Cast ==
- Owen Nares as Tom Smith
- Adrianne Allen as Lady Pamela
- David Hawthorne as Sir Clive Marlowe
- C.M. Hallard as Earl Bellingdon
- Barbara Hoffe as Mrs. Tremayne
- Margaret Yarde as Mrs. Robinson
- Winifred Oughton as Mrs. Jones
- Disney Roebuck as Daniels
- Miles Malleson as minor role
- Netta Westcott as minor role

== Reception ==
Film Weekly wrote: "There is a certain slowness in the progress of the story, but there are compensations in the way of good acting and realistic backgrounds. Owen Nares is quite effective as the Labour man, but Adrienne Allen gives the best performance in the picture – even though a somewhat stagey one – as the woman. A talkie which will make a strong appeal to many."

Kine Weekly wrote: "A sociological problem drama, adapted from Miles Malleson's play, Conflict, which is cleverly worked out and has subtle direction, but is unnecessarily sexual, and is apt to offend the susceptibilities of some. Although political in theme, it is quite open, and is not likely to create controversy. The individual acting is exceptionally good, and the dialogue is well written. Its verbosity (although intelligent) and its theme rather restrict its appeal, but it should be appreciated in good class, but not family, halls."

The Daily Film Renter wrote: "Good subject with proven cast spoiled by being exasperatingly long in its present form. Recommendable feature for most audiences if cut considerably. One would like to give high praise to this naturally acted and in many ways praiseworthy version of a play that is suitable for talkie adaptation. It has a subject which both sentimentally and politically is of wide appeal to the general public, and a cast that does the theme credit."
