= Michael Powell filmography =

Michael Latham Powell (30 September 1905 – 19 February 1990) was an English filmmaker, best known for his films which were made in partnership with Emeric Pressburger.

== Early films ==
Those marked with an * are "Missing, believed lost".

Year	Title	Production company	Other notes
1928	Riviera Revels	G. Ventimigla and Marcel Lucien	A series of comedy shorts. Powell co-directed with Harry Lachman
1930	Caste	Harry Rowson (Ideal)	Uncredited as director, main director was Campbell Gullan
1931	Two Crowded Hours *	Film Engineering	
1932	My Friend the King *	Film Engineering	
1932	Rynox	Film Engineering	
1932	The Rasp *	Film Engineering	
1932	The Star Reporter *	Film Engineering	
1932	Hotel Splendide	Film Engineering. A Gaumont-British Picture Corporation Ltd	
1932	C.O.D. *	Westminster Films	
1932	His Lordship	Westminster Films	
1933	Born Lucky *	Westminster Films	
1934	The Fire Raisers	Gaumont-British	
1934	Red Ensign	Gaumont-British	US title: Strike!
1934	Something Always Happens	Warner Brothers. First National Productions Ltd	
1935	The Girl in the Crowd *	First National	
1935	Lazybones	A Real Art Production	
1935	The Love Test	Fox British	
1935	The Night of the Party	Gaumont-British Picture Corporation	US title: The Murder Party
1935	The Phantom Light	A Gainsborough Picture	
1935	The Price of a Song *	Fox British	
1935	Someday *	Warner British	a.k.a. Young Nowheres
1936	Her Last Affaire	New Ideal Productions Ltd	
1936	The Brown Wallet *	Warner Brothers. First National	
1936	Crown v. Stevens	Warner Brothers. First National Productions Ltd	a.k.a. Third Time Unlucky
1936	The Man Behind the Mask	Joe Rock Studios	reissued as Behind the Mask. Only exists as a cut-down US print.

== Major films ==
Aside from some short films, Powell wrote, produced and directed all of his films from 1939 to 1957 with Emeric Pressburger

Year	Title	Production company	Other notes
1937	The Edge of the World	Joe Rock Productions	
1939	The Spy in Black	Harefield	US title: U-Boat 29
1939	Smith	D&P Productions. Embankment Fellowship Co.	10-minute short film
1939	The Lion Has Wings	London Film Productions	RAF documentary footage with some fictional intercuts
1940	Contraband	British National	US title: Blackout
1940	The Thief of Bagdad	Alexander Korda Films Inc.	co-director
1941	An Airman's Letter to His Mother		a 5-minute short
1941	49th Parallel	Ortus Films (and Ministry of Information (United Kingdom))	US title: The Invaders
1942	One of Our Aircraft Is Missing	The Archers. British National	
1943	The Life and Death of Colonel Blimp	The Archers/ Independent Producers	
1943	The Volunteer	The Archers. Ministry of Information (United Kingdom)	a short propaganda film
1944	A Canterbury Tale	The Archers	
1945	I Know Where I'm Going!	The Archers	
1946	A Matter of Life and Death	The Archers	US title: Stairway To Heaven
1947	Black Narcissus	The Archers for Independent Producers Ltd.	
1948	The Red Shoes	The Archers	
1949	The Small Back Room	The Archers. London Films	
1950	Gone to Earth	The Archers. London Films	US title: The Wild Heart (1952) – substantially re-edited version additional scenes directed by Rouben Mamoulian
1950	The Elusive Pimpernel	London Film Productions (and The Archers)	US title: The Fighting Pimpernel
1951	The Tales of Hoffmann	British Lion Film Corporation (with Vega Productions and The Archers)	
1955	Oh... Rosalinda!!	Associated British Picture Corporation. Michael Powell and Emeric Pressburger	
1956	The Sorcerer's Apprentice	20th Century-Fox Film Corporation/ Norddeutscher Rundfunk	a short ballet
1956	The Battle of the River Plate	Arcturus Productions. Michael Powell and Emeric Pressburger	US title: The Pursuit of the Graf Spee
1957	Ill Met by Moonlight	Michael Powell and Emeric Pressburger for Rank Organisation Film Productions (and Vega Productions)	US title: Night Ambush
1959	Luna de Miel	Michael Powell Production for Suevia Films-Cesáreo González (Spain)/Everdene (GB)	a.k.a. Honeymoon
1960	Peeping Tom	Michael Powell Production	
1961	The Queen's Guards	Imperial. Michael Powell Production	
1963	Herzog Blaubarts Burg	Süddeutscher Rundfunk. Norman Foster Produktion	a.k.a. Bluebeard's Castle
1966	They're a Weird Mob	J. C. Williamson Film Company (Australia)/ Michael Powell Production	Pressburger wrote the script as Richard Imrie
1969	Age of Consent	Nautilus Productions	
1972	The Boy Who Turned Yellow	Roger Cherrill Ltd for the Children's Film Foundation	Script by Pressburger
1978	Return to the Edge of the World	Poseidon Films/ BBC Television	For British TV, framing of the original 1937 film

== Television work ==
Powell also directed episodes of the TV series The Defenders, Espionage and The Nurses.

Year	Title	Production company	Other notes
1963	Never Turn Your Back on a Friend	Herbert Brodkin Ltd.	Episode for the Espionage series
1964	The Frantick Rebel	Herbert Brodkin Ltd.	Episode for the Espionage series
1964	A Free Agent	Herbert Brodkin Ltd.	Episode for the Espionage series
1965	The Sworn Twelve	Herbert Brodkin Ltd.	Episode for The Defenders series
1965	A 39846	Herbert Brodkin Ltd.	Episode for The Nurses series

== Non-directorial work ==
Powell was also involved in the following films in a non-directorial role:

- The Silver Fleet (1943) – Producer
- The End of the River (1947) – Producer
- Aila, pohjolan tytär (a.k.a. Arctic Fury) (1951) – Producer
- Sebastian (1968) – Producer
- Anna Pavlova (1983) – Associate Producer
