= Julian Rochfort Belfrage =

- Born: 19 February 1934; London
- Died: 28 December 1994 (aged 60); London
- Children: Crispian & Rupert Belfrage, sons
- Relatives: Sydney Henning Belfrage, grandfather Bruce Belfrage, father Joan Henley, mother Cedric Belfrage, uncle Sally Belfrage, first cousin Nicolas Belfrage, first cousin

Julian Rochfort Belfrage (19 February 1934 – 28 December 1994) was an actors' agent whose clients included Judi Dench, John Hurt, Daniel Day-Lewis, David Warner, Ian Holm and Colin Blakely. For ten years he was in partnership with Michael Whitehall under the collective name Leading Artists.

Belfrage's obituary in The Independent stated that he "often fired clients he did not like and yet the lowest he would sink in condemnation was that such and such didn't know how to live." Belfrage was a true bon viveur, with a particular love of the turf, which he playfully enjoyed with Hurt and Christopher Reeve. Despite his success, he was described as caring not one jot for money, unless it afforded him a day at the races.

== Life ==
Julian Rochfort Belfrage was born in London on 19 February 1934, the son of actress Joan Henley and Bruce Belfrage, an actor and BBC radio newsreader. He started his career as understudy to Peter Barkworth in the West End play Roar Like a Dove. Despite the theatrical background of his family, his acting career was not successful and he was later persuaded to become a theatrical agent alongside Kenneth Carten.

In the 1960s he joined the London agency, Terence Plunkett-Green, before going into partnership with Michael Whitehall, trading as Leading Artists. When his partnership with Whitehall ended, he set up Julian Belfrage Associates. Belfrage persuaded Daniel Day-Lewis to play Christy Brown in My Left Foot, a part for which Day-Lewis won an Oscar. Belfrage described the moment as the happiest day of his life.

Belfrage married firstly, Gilly Pratt, with whom he had two sons, one of whom, Crispian Belfrage, became a Hollywood actor. He married, secondly, Victoria Van Moyland, who inherited his agency.

An ardent racegoer, Belfrage owned several racehorses. He died in London on 28 December 1994 and a number of races were subsequently named in his honour; the Julian Belfrage Memorial Chase, for example, was held at Towcester Racecourse on 19 March 1997.

On Belfrage's death, Daniel Day-Lewis is said to have suffered a nervous breakdown, as Belfrage had become a father figure in his life.
