= Hotel Splendide =

Hotel Splendide may refer to:

- Hotel Splendide, a 1941 novel by Ludwig Bemelmans.
- Hotel Splendide (1932 film), a 1932 British film
- Hotel Splendide (2000 film), a 2000 British film
