= Nicolas Belfrage =

British wine expert (1940–2022)

Nicolas Belfrage MW
- Born: Nicholas John Belfrage; 19 July 1940; Los Angeles, California, U.S.
- Died: 17 September 2022 (aged 82); London, England
- Citizenship: British, American
- Education: University College London
- Father: Cedric Belfrage
- Relatives: Sydney Henning Belfrage (grandfather); Bruce Belfrage (uncle); Sally Belfrage (sister); Anne Belfrage Zribi-Hertz (sister); Julian Belfrage (first cousin); Bryan Powley (great uncle)

Nicolas Belfrage MW (19 July 1940 – 17 September 2022) was a British Master of Wine, a wine writer and considered one of the foremost experts on Italian wine.

== Life and career ==
Belfrage was born in Los Angeles in 1940, the son of British socialist writer Cedric Belfrage and his wife Molly Castle. He grew up in New York City and later in London where he was educated at St Paul's School on a scholarship. He studied French and Italian at University College London. He worked with Italian wine, either in the trade or as a writer, since the early 1970s and qualified as a Master of Wine in 1980, the first American to achieve this honor.

Belfrage has contributed to publications such as Decanter, The World of Fine Wine, Wein Gourmet, and shared a column in Harpers Magazine with Franco Ziliani, with whom he has also collaborated on contributions to Tom Stevenson's annual Wine Report. For several years he has contributed the Italy section to Hugh Johnson's Pocket Wine Book as well as to the Oz Clarke Pocket Wine Book.

Belfrage was involved commercially in wine since the early 1970s as buyer for various specialist wine merchants. In 1996 he founded Vinexus, a specialist Italian wine importer.

Belfrage's sister was Sally Belfrage, his uncle was Bruce Belfrage and his great uncle was Bryan Powley.

Belfrage relinquished United States citizenship in 2020.

Belfrage died from complications of Parkinson's disease on 17 September 2022, at the age of 82. He was survived by two daughters: Beatriz Belfrage (born 1988) and Ixta Belfrage (born 1991).

== Published works ==
- Life beyond Lambrusco: understanding Italian fine wine (1985)
- Barolo to Valpolicella: The Wines of Northern Italy (1999)
- Brunello to Zibibbo: The Wines of Tuscany, Central and Southern Italy (2001)
- The Finest Wines of Tuscany and Central Italy (2009)
