= Sydney Henning Belfrage =

British physician and writer

- Born: 21 July 1871; Lambeth, London
- Died: 31 May 1950 (aged 78); Penn, Buckinghamshire
- Occupations: Physician, writer
- Children: Cedric Belfrage, Bruce Belfrage, Douglas Henning Belfrage
- Relatives: Nicolas Belfrage (grandson); Julian Rochfort Belfrage (grandson); Sally Belfrage (granddaughter); Ixta Belfrage (great granddaughter); Beatriz Belfrage (great granddaughter)

Sydney Henning Belfrage (21 July 1871 – 31 May 1950) was an English physician and writer. He established a sizable general practice, served as the Divorce Registry's medical inspector, and was regarded as an authority on the law of nullity.

== Life ==
Belfrage was born on 21 July 1871 in Lambeth. He was educated at Merchant Taylors' School, University College Hospital and St Thomas' Hospital. In 1900, he obtained his MD.

Belfrage married Frances Grace Powley on 7 September 1899 at Purley, London. He was a member of the Royal Colleges of Surgeons, a leading member of the New Health Society and physician to Virginia Woolf. He authored the book What's Best to Eat? which was dedicated to Sir William Arbuthnot Lane.

In 1926, Belfrage was Honorary Medical Secretary of the New Health Society.

== Vegetarianism ==
Belfrage lectured on the benefits of a lacto-ovo vegetarian diet. George Bernard Shaw attended his lecture "Diet and Race" in 1934. Belfrage argued that eating vegetables alone was not good enough and that the building material for the body should come from a non-flesh diet that also contains eggs and milk. He attended the 6th World Vegetarian Congress in 1926.

== Selected publications ==
- What's Best to Eat (with a foreword by Elmer McCollum, 1926)
- The A.B.C. of Food (1929)
- Facts About Food (1938)
- Illness (1938)
