= Loyalties (play) =

1922 play by John Galsworthy

- Written by: John Galsworthy
- Original language: English
- Genre: Drama

Premiere
- Date premiered: 8 March 1922
- Place premiered: St Martin's Theatre, London

Loyalties is a 1922 play by the British writer John Galsworthy. It was first staged at St Martins Theatre and ran for over a year. Galsworthy described it as "the only play of mine which I was able to say, when I finished it, no manager will refuse this". The original West End cast included Ernest Milton, Edmund Breon, Eric Maturin, Malcolm Keen, Ian Hunter, Cathleen Nesbitt, Beatrix Thomson, and Meggie Albanesi.

== Dramatis personae ==
Charles Winsor: Owner of Meldon Court, near Newmarket

Lady Adela: His Wife

Ferdinand de Levis: A young Jew

Treisure: Winsor's butler

General Canynge: A racing oracle

Margaret Orme: A society girl

Ronald Dancy: Army Captain

Mabel: His wife

Inspector Dede: Of the County Constabulary

Robert: Winsor's footman

A Constable: Attendant on Dede

Augustus Borring: A clubman

Lord St Erth: A Peer of the Realm

A Footman: Of the Club

Major Colford: A brother officer of Dancy

Edward Graviter: A solicitor, junior partner of Twisden & Graviter's

A Young Clerk: Of Twisden & Graviter's

Gilman: A grocer

Jacob Twisden: Senior partner of Twisden & Graviter's

Ricardos: An Italian wine merchant

== Plot ==
The play is an exposé of antisemitism in English upper-class society in the 1920s. It is set in Meldon Court, a country house near Newmarket, the home of Sir Charles and Lady Adela Winsor. One of their guests, Ferdinand de Levis, has had £1000 stolen from his room, and he charges another of the guests, Captain Ronald Dancy, with the theft. However, de Levis is Jewish and Dancy is a war hero. Despite evidence that Dancy may be guilty, de Levis is threatened with social ostracism by the members of the gentleman's club to which he belongs. He is suspended from the club and in turn resigns. When Mabel, Dancy's wife, pleads with de Levis, as a gentleman, to withdraw the charge, he replies "I'm not a gentleman - I'm a damned Jew!" echoing what Dancy has previously called him. Dancy, under pressure from the members of his club and from his wife, agrees to bring court proceedings against de Levis. The trial begins, but the case ends prematurely when the culprit is discovered.

During the play several characters admit that they don't like Jews, while at the same time phrasing their opinions in ways that seek to avoid a charge of prejudice. Early on, Charles Winsor says "I like Jews. That’s not against him—rather the contrary these days. But he pushes himself." A friend of Mabel's, Margaret Orme, says, "I know lots of splendid Jews, ... but when it comes to the point—! They all stick together; why shouldn't we? It's in the blood." And when Lady Adela tells Margaret that she is proud of her Jewish great grandmother, Margaret says "Inoculated." A well-to-do grocer, Gilman, says, "I don’t like—well, not to put too fine a point upon it—’Ebrews. They work harder; they’re more sober; they’re honest; and they’re everywhere. I’ve nothing against them, but the fact is—they get on so." Gilman has come to give evidence in the case because he thinks that it will help Dancy against de Levis. Few of the characters come out well.

== Adaptations ==
In 1933 the play was made into a film, Loyalties, adapted by W P Lipscomb, directed by Basil Dean and Thorold Dickinson and starring Basil Rathbone as Ferdinand de Levis, Miles Mander as Captain Ronald Dancy, Algernon West as Charles Winsor, Cecily Byrne as Lady Adela Winsor, Alan Napier as General Canynge, Heather Thatcher as Margaret Orme, Joan Wyndham as Mabel Dancy, Athole Stewart as Lord St. Erth, Philip Strange as Major Colford, Robert Mawdesley as Graviter, Lawrence Hanray as Jacob Twisden, Ben Field as Gilman, and Anthony Holles as Ricardos.

BBC Sunday-Night Play staged the play for BBC One in April 1962, with Peter Wyngarde as Ferdinand de Levis, Keith Michell as Dancy, Jennifer Wright as Mabel Dancy, Felix Aylmer as Canynge, David Garth as Graviter, Jack Watling as Winsor, Austin Trevor as St Erth, Oliver Johnston as Twisden, Diana Hope as Lady Adela, and Geoffrey Denys as Treisure.

The play was broadcast on BBC Radio's Saturday Night Theatre in 1967, adapted for radio by Peggy Wells and produced by Betty Davis, with Keith Michell as Captain Ronald Dancy, John Justin as Ferdinand de Levis, Rolf Lefebvre as Charles Winsor, Diana Olsson as Lady Adela Winsor, Wilfred Babbage as Treisure, Robert Sansom as General Canynge, Margaret Ward as Margaret Orme, Hilda Schroder as Mabel Dancy, Stephen Thorne as Inspector Dede, Frederick Treves as Augustus Borring, Geoffrey Wincott as Lord St Erth, Alexander John as Major Colford, Frank Henderson as Graviter, Howieson Culff as Jacob Twisden, Ronald Herdman as Gilman, Harold Kasket as Ricardos, and Gordon Gardner as Robert.

In 1976, BBC Television broadcast a version as part of their Play of the Month series, directed by Rudolph Cartier and produced by Cedric Messina. It starred Edward Fox as Captain Ronald Dancy, Charles Kay as Ferdinand de Levis, John Carson as Charles Winsor, Dinah Sheridan as Lady Adela Winsor, Erik Chitty as Treisure, Robert Flemyng as General Canynge, Polly Adams as Margaret Orme, Catherine Schell as Mabel Dancy, Roger Hammond as Inspector Dede, Jeremy Clyde as Augustus Borring, Peter Dyneley as Lord St. Erth, Tom Criddle as Major Colford, Geoffrey Palmer as Graviter, David Markham as Jacob Twisden, Frank Middlemass as Gilman, and Steve Plytas as Ricardos.

In a review of a revival of the play at the Finborough Theatre in London in 2006, Guardian theatre critic Michael Billington wrote that "With consummate skill, Galsworthy shows how English caste and race loyalties diabolicially intersect" and that "Galsworthy's shockingly neglected plays are eminently revivable social documents". He reported that he saw the play with a packed house "who seemed, like me, to relish Galsworthy's portrait of the poisonous worm inside the woodwork of English society."

== Bibliography ==
- Cody, Gabrielle H. & Sprinchorn, Evert. The Columbia Encyclopedia of Modern Drama; vol. 1. New York: Columbia University Press, 2007.
- Wearing, J. P. The London Stage 1920–1929: A Calendar of Productions, Performers, and Personnel. Rowman & Littlefield, 2014.
