= Ralph Smart =

British film director (1908–2001)

- Born: Ralph Foster Smart; 27 August 1908 Chingford, Essex, England
- Died: 12 February 2001 (aged 92) Bowen, Queensland, Australia
- Occupation: Director, screenwriter and television producer.
- Period: 1927–1973
- Genre: Comedy, drama, adventure, science fiction
- Spouses: Leonie Estcourt Barrett (née Martin); Meg Smart
- Children: 1 child
- Relatives: Patsy Smart (sister)

Ralph Foster Smart OAM (27 August 1908 – 12 February 2001) was an English-born film and television producer, director and writer, who worked in the UK and Australia.

== Early life ==
Smart was born in England to H. C. Smart, an Australian publicist, and his English wife, Hope Daisy Smart, née Foster.

== Career ==
Smart found work in Britain with Anthony Asquith and later alongside the film director Michael Powell, whom he assisted with 'quota quickies': low-budget "B" pictures made partly in order to exploit the advantageous position of the British film industry under the Cinematograph Films Act 1927.

During the Second World War, Smart joined the Royal Australian Air Force in 1942 and served until 1945. Afterward he worked for the Rank Organisation and Ealing Studios, returning to Australia to direct several films beginning with The Overlanders and including Bitter Springs (1950), addressing the mistreatment of young Aborigines.

Back again in Britain, he became an influential figure in ITC television, producing, directing or writing a number of television series and films, including the 1950s series The Adventures of Robin Hood and The Invisible Man. Later he created and produced the highly successful spy series Danger Man (known as Secret Agent in the United States).

In 2000 he was awarded the Order of Australia Medal for "services to the development of the Australian film industry".

He retired to Australia, and died on 12 February 2001, in Bowen, Queensland.

== Selected filmography ==
- A Cottage on Dartmoor (1929) – uncredited writer
- The Woodpigeon Patrol (short; 1930) – writer, director
- The Star Reporter (1932) – writer
- Hotel Splendide (1932) – writer
- C.O.D. (1932) – writer
- His Lordship (1932) – writer
- Born Lucky (1933) – writer
- The Murder Party (1935) – writer
- The Phantom Light (1935) – writer
- Crime Unlimited (1935) – writer
- Sweet Success (short) – 1936) – director
- For Dealers Only (Ford Motor Company short) – (1937) – director
- Convict 99 (1938) – writer
- Alf's Button Afloat (1938) – writer
- The Good Old Days (1940) – story
- Charley's (Big-Hearted) Aunt (1940) – writer
- Forgotten Men (1942) (documentary short) - director
- South West Pacific (1943) – actor
- Island Target (documentary; 1945) – director
- The Overlanders (1946) – writer, associate producer
- Bush Christmas (1947) – writer, director, producer
- Eureka Stockade (1948) – writer (additional scenes)
- Quartet (1948; anthology film, segment The Facts of Life) – director
- A Boy, a Girl and a Bike (1949) – director
- Bitter Springs (1950) – story, director
- Where No Vultures Fly (1951) – writer
- Never Take No For an Answer (1951) – writer, director
- Curtain Up (1952) – director
- Always a Bride (1953) – writer, director
- The Adventures of Robin Hood (TV series; 1955–57) – writer, director
- The Adventures of Sir Lancelot (TV series; 1956) – director
- The Buccaneers (TV series; 1956) – director, producer
- The Flying Scot (1957) – co-writer
- The Adventures of Mr. Pastry (TV short; 1958) – director
- William Tell (TV series; 1958–59) – executive producer, writer, director
- The Invisible Man (TV series; 1958–59) – writer, director, producer
- Danger Man (TV series; 1960–61) – co-creator, writer, director, producer
- Danger Man (TV series; 1964–66, US title: Secret Agent) – co-creator, writer, script editor, executive producer
- Riptide (TV series; 1969) – writer, producer
- My Partner the Ghost (TV series; 1969) – writer
- The Protectors (TV series; 1972) – writer
- Elephant Boy (TV series; 1972) – writer

== Writing credits ==
Production	Notes	Broadcaster
The Woodpigeon Patrol	Feature film (co-written and directed with F.R. Lucas, 1930)	N/A
The Star Reporter	Short film (co-written with Philip MacDonald, 1932)	N/A
Hotel Splendide	Short film (co-written with Philip MacDonald, 1932)	N/A
C.O.D	Feature film (co-written with Philip MacDonald, 1932)	N/A
His Lordship	Feature film (1932)	N/A
Born Lucky	Feature film (1933)	N/A
The Night of the Party	Feature film (co-written with Roland Pertwee, 1935)	N/A
The Phantom Light	Feature film (co-written with J Jefferson Farjeon and Austin Melford, 1935)	N/A
Crime Unlimited	Feature film (co-written with Brock Williams, 1935)	N/A
Convict 99	Feature film (co-written with Cyril Campion, Jack Davis Jr., Marriott Edgar and Val Guest, 1938)	N/A
Alf's Button Afloat	Feature film (co-written with Marriott Edgar and Val Guest, 1938)	N/A
The Good Old Days	Feature film (co-written with Austin Melford and John Dighton, 1940)	N/A
Charley's (Big-Hearted) Aunt	Feature film (co-written with Marriott Edgar and J. O. C. Orton, 1940)	N/A
Bush Christmas	Feature film (also directed, 1947)	N/A
Eureka Stockade	Feature film (co-written with Walter Greenwood and Harry Watt, 1949; additional scenes)	N/A
Bitter Springs	Feature film (co-written with Monja Danischewsky and W. P. Lipscomb, 1950)	N/A
Where No Vultures Fly	Feature film (co-written with W. P. Lipscomb and Leslie Norman, 1951)	N/A
Never Take No for an Answer	Feature film (co-written and -directed with Maurice Cloche, 1951)	N/A
Always a Bride	Feature film (co-written with Peter Jones, 1953)	N/A
The Adventures of Robin Hood	8 episodes (1956–1957)	ITV
The Flying Scot	Feature film (co-written with Norman Hudis and Jan Read, 1957)	N/A
The Adventures of William Tell	12 episodes (also producer, 1958–1959)	ITV
The Invisible Man	6 episodes (also producer, 1959)	ITV
Danger Man	27 episodes (1960–1962)	ITV
Danger Man (Secret Agent)	14 episodes (also executive producer, 1964–1966)	ITV
Koroshi	Television film (1968)	N/A
The Champions	"To Trap a Rat" (1968); "Get Me Out of Here!" (1969)	ITV
Riptide	8 episodes (1969)	Seven Network
Randall and Hopkirk (Deceased)	"My Late Lamented Friend and Partner" (1969); "But What a Sweet Little Room" (1969)	ITV
The Protectors	"The Numbers Game" (1972)	ITV
Elephant Boy	13 episodes (co-written with Tony Morphett, Ted Roberts, David Whitaker and Ian Stuart Black, 1973)	Seven Network
