= The Good Old Days (film) =

1939 film

- Max Miller (left) in the film
- Directed by: Roy William Neill
- Written by: Austin Melford; John Dighton
- Story by: Ralph Smart
- Produced by: Jerome Jackson
- Starring: Max Miller; Hal Walters; Kathleen Gibson
- Cinematography: Basil Emmott
- Music by: Bretton Byrd
- Production company: Warner Brothers
- Distributed by: Warner Brothers-First National Productions
- Release date: June 1939 (UK)
- Running time: 79 minutes
- Country: United Kingdom
- Language: English

The Good Old Days is a lost 1939 British historical comedy film directed by Roy William Neill and starring Max Miller, Hal Walters and Kathleen Gibson. It was written by Austin Melford and John Dighton based on a story by Ralph Smart, The film tells the story of a group of entertainers who mount an illegal show at a tavern in the 1840s.

== Preservation status ==
The British Film Institute has classed The Good Old Days as a lost film, included in its "75 Most Wanted" list. The BFI National Archive holds a collection of ephemera and stills but no film or video materials.

== Plot ==
In 1840s, a law prohibits drama except in licensed theatres. When travelling showman Alexander the Greatest and his troupe ignore the law and perform in a pub, the owner informs the police and Alexander faces prison. But by locating a missing child, he escapes punishment.

== Cast ==
- Max Miller as Alexander "The Greatest"
- Hal Walters as Titch
- Kathleen Gibson as Polly
- H.F. Maltby as Randolph Macaulay
- Martita Hunt as Sara Macaulay
- Anthony Shaw as Lovelace
- Allan Jeayes as Shadwell
- Sam Wilkinson as Croker
- Roy Emerton as Grimes
- Phyllis Monkman as Mrs. Bennett
- Ian Fleming as Lord Wakely

== Reception ==
The Monthly Film Bulletin wrote: "This film is essentially a vehicle for Max Miller and his 'cheeky chappy' type of humour, with Hal Walters making an admirable 'stooge' – it being only necessary to add that this film can be recommended to all Max Miller fans."

Kine Weekly wrote: "The plot itself is not particularly strong, but it nevertheless leads to a number of robust gags."

The Daily Film Renter wrote: "Max Miller goes back to 1840 for the laughs, appearing as theatrical troupe manager saved from gaol sentence by recovering peer's missing son. Stellar patter and knockabout climax featuring soot 'battle' provide main entertainment angles, and scenes of comedian in stocks also pack amusement quota, but narrative errs occasionally on side of tedium, Miller seeming trifle restricted by period characterisation. Reliable popular entertainment, with principal pull for star fans."

Picturegoer wrote: "Max Miller does his best to make the good old days of the forties seem good, but he does not succeed. Costume is not his metier. ... Taken all in all, the film fails to be more than very superficially entertaining."

Variety wrote: "Quite an amusing idea in this latest Max Miller vehicle, and far ahead of his last effort. Perhaps its greatest asset is slick direction, for not a minute is wasted, and theme should interest U.S. audiences. ... Miller is a music-hall name here, and scored in brief character parts in his first films. Stardom is a different matter, however. Many will enjoy the picture in spite of him, and not because of him. Supporting cast leaves nothing to be desired, while direction is creditable."

Graham Greene wrote in The Spectator: "I am inclined to avoid a Max Miller film, but The Good Old Days has one Regency sequence of a pie-eating contest in a public-house which almost makes it worth a visit. The sight of seconds massaging the huge stomachs of the contestants – the voice of the referee tolling out the score, 'The Champion is starting his ninth pie, leading by four pies from the Camberwell Cannibal' – has a pleasant period grossness."

== See also ==
- List of lost films
