= Allan Jeayes =

British actor (1885–1963)

- Born: Allan John Jeayes; 19 January 1885; Barnet, Hertfordshire, England
- Died: 20 September 1963 (aged 78); Marylebone, London, England
- Occupation: Actor
- Years active: 1918–1962

Allan John Jeayes (19 January 1885 – 20 September 1963) was an English stage and film actor.

Jeayes was born in Barnet, Hertfordshire, the son of Isaac Herbert Jeayes, archivist and Assistant Keeper of Manuscripts at the British Museum.

Jeayes was educated at Merchant Taylor's School, and was originally a farmer, before making his stage debut in 1906.

Jeayes made his film debut in the 1918 film Nelson as Sir William Hamilton. He appeared in a number of films by producer Alexander Korda. His last film appearance was in 1962's Reach for Glory. He starred as Howard Joyce in the original 1927 Broadway production of The Letter and played Sir Lawrence Wargarve in the 1943 London production of And Then There Were None.

Jeayes died on 20 September 1963, aged 78, in Marylebone, London.

The National Portrait Gallery, London, has two photographic portraits of him.

== Filmography ==
- Nelson (1918) as Sir William Hamilton (film debut)
- The Solitary Cyclist (1921, Short) as Woodly
- A Gentleman of France (1921) as Henry of Navarre
- The Hound of the Baskervilles (1921) as Dr. James Mortimer
- The Missioner (1922) as Gilbert Deyes
- The Third Round (1925) as Carl Peterson
- The Hate Ship (1929) as Dr. Saunders
- The Ghost Train (1931) as Dr. Sterling
- Stranglehold (1931) as King
- Above Rubies (1932, Short) as Lamont
- The Impassive Footman (1932) as John Marwood
- Anne One Hundred (1933) as Penvale
- Purse Strings (1933) as Walford
- Paris Plane (1933) as Minor Role
- Song of the Plough (1933) as Joe Saxby
- Little Napoleon (1933, Short) as Shenstone
- Eyes of Fate (1933) as Knocker
- Ask Beccles (1933) as Matthew Blaise
- The Rise of Catherine the Great (1934) as Colonel Karnilov
- Colonel Blood (1934) as Charles II
- Red Ensign (1934) as Grierson
- The Camels Are Coming (1934) as Sheikh
- The Scarlet Pimpernel (1934) as Lord Grenville
- Sanders of the River (1935) as Father O'Leary
- Drake of England (1935) as Don Bernardino
- The Tunnel (1935) as Steel Magnate (uncredited)
- Koenigsmark (1935) as Grand Duke Rodolphe
- King of the Damned (1935) as Dr. Prada
- Things to Come (1936) as Mr. Cabal (uncredited)
- Forget Me Not (1936) as London Theatre Manager
- Seven Sinners (1936) as Heinrich Wagner
- Crown v. Stevens (1936) as Inspector Carter
- The House of the Spaniard (1936) as Don Pedro de Guzman
- Rembrandt (1936) as Doctor Tulp
- His Lordship (1936) as Barak
- Action for Slander (1937) as Colonel
- Elephant Boy (1937) as Machua Appa
- The High Command (1937) as H.E., the Governor
- Knight Without Armour (1937) as White General
- The Squeaker (1937) as Inspector Elford
- Return of the Scarlet Pimpernel (1937) as Judge of the Tribunal
- The Green Cockatoo (1937) as The Detective Inspector
- I, Claudius (1937, Unreleased) as Musa, the emperor's physician
- 13 Men and a Gun (1938) as General Vloty
- Dangerous Medicine (1938) as Supt. Fox
- A Royal Divorce (1938) as Marat
- They Drive by Night (1938) as Wally Mason
- Life of St. Paul (1938, Short) as Minor Role
- Everything Happens to Me (1938)
- Q Planes (1939) as Minor Role (uncredited)
- The Four Feathers (1939) as General Faversham
- Smith (1939, Short) as Employer
- The Stars Look Down (1940) as Richard Barras
- The Proud Valley (1940) as Mr. Trevor
- The Spider (1940) as George Hackett
- Spy for a Day (1940) as Col. Roberts
- The Good Old Days (1940) as Shadwell
- A Window in London (1940) as Sir Edward (uncredited)
- Convoy (1940) as Commander Blount
- Night Train to Munich (1940) as Prisoner in Concentration Camp Lineup (uncredited)
- The Flying Squad (1940) as Johnson
- The Thief of Bagdad (1940) as The Story Teller
- Sailors Three (1940) as British Commander
- You Will Remember (1941) as Signor Foli
- Old Bill and Son (1941) as Willoughby
- Inspector Hornleigh Goes To It (1941) as Brigadier Lloyd (uncredited)
- "Pimpernel" Smith (1941) as Dr Benckendorf
- Uncensored (1942) (uncredited)
- Talk About Jacqueline (1942) (uncredited)
- Tomorrow We Live (1943) as Pogo
- The Shipbuilders (1943) as Ralph
- Dead of Night (1945) as Maurice Olcott (segment "The Ventriloquist's Dummy")
- Perfect Strangers (1945) as Commander
- Lisbon Story (1946) as Dr. Cartier
- The Man Within (1947) as Judge
- Blanche Fury (1948) as Mr. Weatherby
- Saraband for Dead Lovers (1948) as Governor of Ahlden
- Obsession (1949) as Clubman #2
- The Reluctant Widow (1950) as Colonel
- The Song in the Forest (1950, TV Movie) as Emperor Franz Josef
- Waterfront (1950) as Prison officer
- Reach for Glory (1962) as Crabtree (final film)
