= Sexton Blake and the Bearded Doctor =

- John Turnbull and George Curzon in the film
- Directed by: George A. Cooper
- Screenplay by: Rex Hardinge
- Based on: The Blazing Launch Murder by Rex Hardinge
- Produced by: George A. Cooper
- Starring: George Curzon; Henry Oscar; Tony Sympson
- Cinematography: Alex Bryce
- Production company: Fox-British Pictures
- Distributed by: Metro-Goldwyn-Mayer (UK)
- Release date: 1935
- Running time: 64 minutes
- Country: United Kingdom
- Language: English

Sexton Blake and the Bearded Doctor (also known as The River Mystery) is a 1935 British mystery film directed by George A. Cooper and starring George Curzon, Henry Oscar and Tony Sympson. It was written by Rex Hardinge based on his 1934 novel The Blazing Launch Murder, and was made as a quota quickie. It was one of George Curzon's three film portrayals as the fictional detective.

== Preservation status ==
The British Film Institute National Archive holds a collection of ephemera and stills but no film or video materials.

== Premise ==
When a famous violinist is found dead in mysterious circumstances, Inspector Donnell thinks the death was accidental. Sexton Blake, however, believes the man has been murdered, and on investigation he uncovers an insurance fraud.

== Cast ==
- George Curzon as Sexton Blake
- Henry Oscar as Doctor Gibbs
- Tony Sympson as Tinker
- Gillian Maude as Janet
- Philip Ray as Jim Cameron
- John Turnbull as Inspector Donnell
- Edward Dignon as Hawkins
- James Knight as Red
- Donald Wolfit as Percy

== Reception ==
The Monthly Film Bulletin wrote: "There is plenty of fun supplied by Tinker, Sexton Blake's assistant, and by one of the crooks who has been a schoolmaster and takes it upon himself to correct his confederates' grammar; Donald Wolfit plays this part well. Gillian Maude is good in taking a hysterical part without forcing it, and she combines well with Phil Ray. George Curzon as Sexton Blake acts well and is fully convincing. The photography is good, and the sets admirably conceived."

Kine Weekly wrote: "Sexton Blake, the famous detective, is given a raw deal in this British mystery play. George Curzon is not too bad in the name part – few could have improved on his performance in the circumstances – but the story is too disjointed and old-fashioned to allow him to place the great character of fiction as firmly on the screen as Sherlock Holmes and Philo Vance. In short, the film is a poor dish to set before audiences accustomed to the strong meat represented by the average American thriller. "

Picture Show wrote: "Somewhat confusing melodrama."
