= Crown v. Stevens =

1936 British film by Michael Powell

- Directed by: Michael Powell
- Written by: Brock Williams
- Based on: Third Time Unlucky; 1935 novel by Laurence Meynell
- Produced by: Irving Asher
- Starring: Beatrix Thomson; Patric Knowles
- Cinematography: Basil Emmott
- Edited by: A. B. Bates
- Production company: Warner Bros.
- Distributed by: Warner Bros.
- Release date: 3 August 1936 (UK)
- Running time: 66 minutes
- Country: United Kingdom
- Language: English

Crown v. Stevens (also known as Third Time Unlucky) is a 1936 British crime thriller film directed by Michael Powell, starring Beatrix Thomson and Patric Knowles and featuring Glennis Lorimer and Googie Withers. It was written by Brock Williams based on the 1935 novel Third Time Unlucky by Laurence Meynell, and was made as a quota quickie.

== Plot ==
Ex-dancer Doris Stevens kills a moneylender who is pressing her for settlement of her debt and threatening to tell her respectable businessman husband. Chris Jensen, who also owes money (for a ring he gave to his fiancée, who ran off with it) sees her there but does not report her. After she leaves, he burns pages from the moneylender's ledger which listed his debt. Later, Jensen finds out the woman is his employer's wife. He later accidentally intervenes when Doris attempts to murder her dull and stingy husband. When her husband is saved from dying, he admits her guilt and is taken away by the police.

== Cast ==
- Beatrix Thomson as Doris Stevens
- Patric Knowles as Chris Jensen
- Glennis Lorimer as Miss Molly Hobbes
- Reginald Purdell as Alf
- Allan Jeayes as Inspector Carter
- Frederick Piper as Arthur Stevens
- Googie Withers as Ella Levine
- Mabel Poulton as Mamie
- Billy Watts as Joe Andrews (uncredited)
- Davina Craig as Maggie (uncredited)
- Morris Harvey as Maurice Bayleck (uncredited)
- Bernard Miles as Detective Wells (uncredited)

== Production ==
Director Michael Powell said of the five "quota quickies" he directed for producer Irving Asher at Warner Bros.' Teddington Studios, that they were "a damn sight more honest and more entertaining" then other films he worked on at the time, "because they were not trying to be anything but what they were, and they were tailored from first-class scripts". These were cut down to 50 pages by the story department and handed over to the director. Powell called Crown vs. Stevens, his next-to-last film for Asher, a "tight little drama".

== Critical reception ==
Kinematograph Weekly called it a "Vivid portrayal of a young woman who commits murder and then tries to poison her husband, thereby involving his employee, a witness to the former crime. Plot is entirely suited to those who do not demand that a crime story should justify its existence by reaching too high an artistic level in theme, acting or presentation. Definitely unsuited to the family, the picture may nevertheless find a place in the average programme as a quota thriller."

TV Guide called it "Occasionally suspenseful," though opined "the plot is soggy and the actors all wet."

Dennis Schwartz noted "a very entertaining little melodrama," and concluded "The acting honors go to (Beatrix) Thomson. The stage actress was superb as the quintessential femme fatale, and easily steals this film from her capable co-stars."
