= Purse Strings =

- Chili Bouchier and Gyles Isham in the film
- Directed by: Henry Edwards
- Written by: Bernard Parry (play)
- Produced by: Herbert Wilcox
- Starring: Chili Bouchier; Gyles Isham; Allan Jeayes
- Cinematography: Henry Harris
- Production company: British and Dominions
- Distributed by: Paramount British Pictures
- Release date: July 1933
- Running time: 69 minutes
- Country: United Kingdom
- Language: English

Purse Strings is a 1933 British drama film directed by Henry Edwards and starring Chili Bouchier, Gyles Isham and Allan Jeayes. It was written by Bernard Parry based on his play, and was made as a quota quickie at British and Dominion's Elstree Studios.

== Preservation status ==
The British Film Institute National Archive holds a collection of ephemera and stills but no film or video materials.

== Plot ==
Mary Willmore, a young wife whose wealthy husband Jim refuses to give her a proper allowance, turns, in desparation, to shoplifting. She is caught, and the store owner, Walford, tries to force her to become his mistress by threatening prosecution. When she confesses to Jim, in his anger he libels Walford, and in an out-of-court settlement he avoids payment by declaring himself bankrupt and signing his income over to Mary... who then holds the purse strings.

== Cast ==
- Chili Bouchier as Mary Willmore
- Gyles Isham as James Willmore
- G. H. Mulcaster as Edward Ashby
- Allan Jeayes as Walford
- Joan Henley as Ida Bentley
- Evelyn Roberts as Beauchamp

== Reception ==
Film Weekly wrote: "An unpretentious British picture with elements of originality. The story idea is excellent, and it is a great pity the producers have falled to make the most of it. What might have been a thoroughly good and original film is handicapped by casual treatment and direction. ... Both humour and human melodrama emerge naturally from the narrative, but the direction is uninspired and the acting just inoderately competent in most cases. This is a film which should be made all over again on a much more ambitious scale."

The Daily Film Renter wrote: "Though for greater part story is of serious problem type, last reel degenerates into near farce. Nearly all dialogue. Mechanical production, adequately made. ... General production qualities are adequate, but the story drags, and is just a lot of talk."

Kine Weekly wrote: "An unpretentious marital drama which has a reasonable and original theme, one which, unfortunately, has not been exploited to the fullest advantage. However, there is much in the play to interest women, and especially married women, and it is this potent angle which should assure it some measure of success as a second feature."
