= Bruce Belfrage =

English actor (1900–1974)

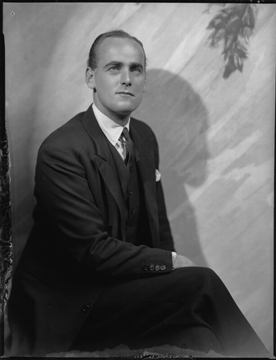
- Photo by Lafayette, 1930
- Born: 30 October 1900; Marylebone, London
- Died: August 1974; Sydney, Australia
- Education: Gresham's School; St John's College, Oxford
- Occupations: Actor, broadcaster
- Known for: BBC newsreader during World War II
- Relatives: Sydney Henning Belfrage, father Frances Grace Powley, mother Joan Henley, first wife Joyce Belfrage, second wife Julian Belfrage, son Cedric Belfrage, brother Sally Belfrage, niece Nicolas Belfrage, nephew Anne Belfrage-Hertz, niece Bryan Powley, uncle

Bruce Belfrage (30 October 1900 – August 1974) was an English actor and BBC radio newsreader. He was a casting director at the BBC between 1936 and 1939, and founded the BBC Repertory Company in 1939.

== Early life ==
Bruce Belfrage was born in Marylebone, London, the son of Frances Grace (née Powley) and Sydney Henning Belfrage, a physician and author. His younger brother was the author and journalist Cedric Belfrage. He was educated at Gresham's School before taking an honours degree in modern languages at St John's College, Oxford.

== Career ==
Belfrage is reported as performing on stage in London with The Strolling Players in February 1923. He played in a notable triumph—A Sleeping Clergyman—with Robert Donat in 1933 and in BBC radio plays in 1934. He appeared in his first film in 1932. He was a broadcaster in the early days of 2LO at Savoy Hill, and in 1935 joined the BBC as a casting director, later becoming a newsreader and announcer.

In a famous incident on 15 October 1940, the BBC's Broadcasting House took a direct hit from a delayed-action German bomb, which eventually exploded during the nine o'clock radio news read by Belfrage. Seven people were killed, and Belfrage, covered with plaster and soot, carried on reading the news as if nothing had happened. Listeners at home heard just a dull thud.

In 1942, he enlisted in the Royal Naval Reserve and was demobilised with the rank of Lieutenant-Commander.

Belfrage was an unsuccessful Liberal candidate for the South Buckinghamshire division at the 1950 general election. He polled 16.5%, and did not contest another election.

== Migration to Australia ==
In September 1958, for health reasons, Belfrage migrated to Australia with his second wife Joyce, a TV producer. They lived in Melbourne for seven months and transferred to Sydney in 1959. Joyce Belfrage resigned from ABC in 1962 to work in the advertising industry. She initiated a media studies programme at Macquarie University.

== Death ==
Bruce Belfrage died in Sydney at the age of 73. He was married to the actress Joan Henley, with whom he had a son, Julian Rochfort Belfrage. After his divorce from Henley, Belfrage married Joyce Belfrage.

== Filmography ==
- C.O.D.. (1932) - Philip
- The Scarlet Pimpernel (1934) - Pitt
- Too Many Millions (1934)
- Full Circle (1935) - Clyde Warren
- War Front (1941) - Newspaper editor
- Hue and Cry (1947) - BBC announcer
- Man on the Run (1948) - BBC Newscaster
- I Killed the Count (1948) - Viscount Sorrington
- Corridor of Mirrors (1948) - Sir David Conway
- Black Magic (1949) - Crown Prosecutor
- Warning to Wantons (1949) - Archimandrite
- Ten Little Niggers (1949) - Sir Lawrence Wargrave
- The Case of Charles Peace (1949) - Prosecution Counsel
- Miss Pilgrim's Progress (1950) - Manager
- Mister Drake's Duck (1951) - Air Vice Marshal
- Home to Danger (1951) - Solicitor
- The Galloping Major (1951) - Himself/Radio Commentator
- Never Look Back (1952) - Judge

== Publication ==
One Man In His Time, by Bruce Belfrage. Published by Hodder & Stoughton, London, 1951
