= Joan Henley =

Irish actress and radio presenter (1904–1986)

- Born: 2 September 1904; Dublin, Ireland
- Died: 10 February 1986 (aged 81); Hove, East Sussex, England
- Occupation: actress
- Years active: (at least) 1927–1986

Joan Henley (2 September 1904 – 10 February 1986) was an Irish actress and radio presenter. She was active on the London stage since at least 1927 in ingenue roles, and appeared there throughout the 1930s. Her first film role was a supporting part in Purse Strings in 1933. She had a career of over 50 years in film and television, but her appearances were seldom and mostly small because she concentrated on the stage and her private life. She is probably best known for her role as the friendly spinster Teresa Alan in the Oscar-winning romance film A Room with a View, which was released less than a year before her death.

Joan Henley married Bruce Belfrage in 1930 and they had a son, Julian Belfrage, who became an actor's agent. After her divorce from Belfrage, she was married to author Laurence Meynell from 1956 until her death.

== Filmography ==
- Purse Strings (1933) as Ida Bentley
- Charley's Aunt (1938, TV Movie) as Donna Lucia
- School for Randle (1949)
- Reluctant Heroes (1951) (uncredited)
- The Common Room (1959, TV Series) as Miss Grenville
- Peridot Flight (1960, TV Series) as Lady Stilton
- The Reckoning (1970) as Mrs. Reynolds
- The Rivals of Sherlock Holmes (1971, TV Series) as Mrs. Wycherly
- Follow Me! (1972) as Dinner Guest (uncredited)
- Hadleigh (1973, TV Series) as Enid Broughton
- Dial M for Murder (1974, TV Series) as Dowager
- Days of Hope (1975, TV Mini-Series) as Lady Wimborne
- Armchair Thriller (1978, TV Series) as Lady at Garden Party
- The Thirty Nine Steps (1978) as Lady Nettleship
- A Room with a View (1985) as Miss Teresa Alan
- The Good Doctor Bodkin-Adams (1986, TV Movie) as Mrs. Morrell
- Shades of Love: Sincerely, Violet (1987) as Maggie (final film role)
