= Jerry Verno =

British actor (1895–1975)

- Jerry Verno (centre) in Two Crowded Hours
- Born: 26 July 1895; London, England, UK
- Died: 29 June 1975 (aged 79); London, England, UK
- Occupation: Actor
- Years active: 1931–1966

Jerry Verno (26 July 1895 – 29 June 1975) was a British film actor. He appeared in 39 films between 1931 and 1966, including five films directed by Michael Powell, and two with Alfred Hitchcock.

He was born in London.

As well as appearing in films, he also took the role of Mr. McGregor in a dramatised series of Beatrix Potter tales produced by Fiona Bentley and recorded by the His Master's Voice Junior Record Club (words by David Croft, music by Cyril Ornadel).

== Filmography ==
- Two Crowded Hours (1931, Short) – Jim
- The Beggar Student (1931) – Jan Janski
- My Friend the King (1932) – Jim
- Hotel Splendide (1932) – Jerry Mason
- His Wife's Mother (1932) – Henry
- There Goes the Bride (1932) – Clark – the chauffeur
- His Lordship (1932) – Bert Gibbs
- The Life of the Party (1934) – Arthur Bleeby
- Lieutenant Daring R.N. (1935) – AB Swallow
- Royal Cavalcade (1935) – Taxpayer
- The 39 Steps (1935) – Commercial Traveller No. 2
- Sweeney Todd: The Demon Barber of Fleet Street (1936) – Pearley
- Ourselves Alone (1936) – Private Parsley
- Broken Blossoms (1936) – Bert
- Gypsy Melody (1936) – Madame Beatrice
- Pagliacci (1936) – Beppe, comic trouper
- Sensation (1936) – Spikey
- Farewell Again (1937) – Pvt. George Judd
- Non-Stop New York (1937) – Steward
- Young and Innocent (1937) – Lorry Driver
- Oh Boy! (1938) – Shopwalker
- Old Mother Riley in Paris (1938) – Joe
- Queer Cargo (1938) – Slops
- Sidewalks of London (1938) – Drunk (uncredited)
- Anything to Declare? (1938) – Hugo Guppy
- The Gables Mystery (1938) – Potts
- Mountains O'Mourne (1938) – Dip Evans
- The Chinese Bungalow (1940) – Stubbins
- The Girl in the News (1940) – Charlie – Prisoner in Police Car (uncredited)
- The Common Touch (1941) – Office Messenger
- Bothered by a Beard (1946) – sailor
- The Red Shoes (1948) – Stage-Door Keeper
- The Perfect Woman (1949) – Football Fan on Underground
- Dear Mr. Prohack (1949) – Taxi Driver (uncredited)
- The Belles of St Trinian's (1954) – Alf – the Bookmaker
- After the Ball (1957) – Harry Ball
- Watch it, Sailor! (1961) – Cab Driver (uncredited)
- A Place to Go (1963) – Nobby Knowles
- The Plague of the Zombies (1966) – Landlord (uncredited)
