= Beatrix Thomson =

British actress (1900–1986)

- Born: 13 March 1900; Wandsworth, Surrey, United Kingdom
- Died: 23 February 1986 (aged 85); Farnham, Surrey, United Kingdom
- Occupation: Actress

Beatrix Thomson (1900–1986) was a British stage actress. She also made a handful of appearances in film and television. A graduate of RADA, she made her West End debut in John Galsworthy's Loyalties in 1922. She was married to the actor Claude Rains from 1924 to 1935.

Her film roles include Lucie Dreyfus in Dreyfus (1931) and the title role in Michael Powell's quota quickie Crown v. Stevens (1936).

She also wrote several works for the stage.

== Selected stage credits ==
- Loyalties by John Galsworthy (1922)
- The Rivals by Richard Brinsley Sheridan (1925)
- Three Sisters by Anton Chekhov (1926)
- The Berg by Ernest Raymond (1929)
- The Way Out by H. C. McNeile (1930)

== Selected filmography ==
- Dreyfus (1931)
- The Old Curiosity Shop (1934)
- Crown v. Stevens (1936)
- The Story of Shirley Yorke (1948)

== As dramatist ==
- Special Delivery, thriller, adapted from a short story
- Set to Music, incorporating music without becoming a musical
- Woman Alive, adaptation of Susan Ertz's short story
- Sons of Adam, dealing with racial tension

All four were written by 1938, and at least one, Sons of Adam, was staged in London.

== Bibliography ==
- Borovsky, Victor. A Triptych from the Russian Theatre: An Artistic Biography of the Komissarzhevskys. C. Hurst & Co, 2001.
- Skal, David J. & Rains, Jessica. Claude Rains: An Actor's Voice. University Press of Kentucky, 2008.
- Wearing, J.P. The London Stage 1920-1929: A Calendar of Productions, Performers, and Personnel. Rowman & Littlefield, 2014.
