= My Friend the King =

1932 film

- Jerry Verno (centre) and Eric Pavitt (right)
- Directed by: Michael Powell
- Written by: John Jefferson Farjeon
- Produced by: Jerome Jackson
- Starring: Jerry Verno
- Cinematography: Geoffrey Faithfull
- Edited by: Arthur Seaborne
- Distributed by: Film Engineering
- Release date: 4 April 1932
- Running time: 47 minutes
- Country: United Kingdom
- Language: English

My Friend the King is a lost 1932 British comedy film, directed by Michael Powell and starring Jerry Verno. It was written by John Jefferson Farjeon.

The film was a follow-up to Two Crowded Hours (1931), Powell's directorial debut, with comedian Verno reprising his role as a chirpy Cockney taxi driver who gets mixed up in shady doings. This film however was less well-received, with Powell recalling it as "a complete failure", also noting that he worked on six films during 1932 and that "they couldn't all be good...and they weren't".

== Preservation status ==
The British Film Institute has classed My Friend the King as a lost film. Its National Archive holds a collection of stills but no film or video materials. It is one of eleven quota quickies directed by Powell between 1931 and 1936 of which no print is known to survive.

== Plot ==
Taxi driver Jim befriends Ruritanian child King Ludwig while the latter is on a visit to London. A plot is afoot by sinister forces to kidnap Ludwig, and Jim becomes caught up in the drama. After the child is abducted Jim uses all his ingenuity, including cross-dressing as a countess and becoming involved in a car chase, to rescue him from his captors.

== Cast ==
- Jerry Verno as Jim
- Robert Holmes as Captain Felz
- Tracy Holmes as Count Huelin
- Eric Pavitt as King Ludwig
- Phyllis Loring as Princess Helma
- Luli Deste as Countess Zena
- Harold Saxon-Snell as Karl
- Victor Fairley as Josef

== Reception ==
The Bioscope wrote: "a better vehicle really should have been devised for a comedian of such ability as Verno."

Kine Weekly wrote: "Ruritanian melodrama, which, after a slow start, gets going quite well and fully exploits the star's Cockney humour. ... Jerry Verno continues his career as a taxi-driver in his own breezy style. He could have had better material, but he certainly makes the most of what he has got. The supporting cast is very good. Michael Powell presents his burlesque very well, with the maximum of movement and pictorial development. The humour is not subtle, but it has a distinctly popular flavour and will undoubtedly appeal to the masses."

The Daily Film Renter wrote: Semi-burlesque 'Ruritanian' melodrama, with laboured comedy relief scarcely compensating the stilted methods of cast interpreting the story in chief. ... The level of verbal wit is considerably below that obtaining on the average cab rank. There is a certain amount of appeal in the character of the boy-king and his friendship for the taxi-driver ... but the whole production has a painful air of amateurishness."

Picturegoer wrote: "There is not much subtlety about the burlesque, but it is presented with plenty of action... not great stuff this, but helps pass three-quarters of an hour quite pleasantly."

Film Weekly wrote: "Although an unambitious production, My Friend the King contains, in miniature, the elements of a good screen comedy – plenty of action, an amusing comedian, and a plot that gives him ample scope. ... Jerry Verno has a comedy style of his own, which is extremely effective, and wins the laughs. The rest of the picture has a gratifying competence."
