= Everything Happens to Me (1938 film) =

Film by Roy William Neill

- Directed by: Roy William Neill
- Written by: John Dighton; Austin Melford
- Produced by: Jerome Jackson
- Starring: Max Miller; Chili Bouchier; H. F. Maltby
- Cinematography: Basil Emmott
- Edited by: Leslie Norman
- Music by: Louis Levy
- Production company: Warner Brothers
- Distributed by: Warner Brothers-First National Productions
- Release date: December 1938
- Running time: 82 minutes
- Country: United Kingdom
- Language: English

Everything Happens to Me is a 1938 British comedy film directed by Roy William Neill and starring Max Miller, Chili Bouchier and H. F. Maltby. It was written by John Dighton and Austin Melford.

== Synopsis ==
Charles Cromwell is a vacuum-cleaner salesman volunteering as an election agent to canvas on behalf of prospective candidate Arthur Gusty. However, when he learns from nurse Sally Green that Gusty is a crook who has been systematically siphoning off funds from the local orphanage into his own pocket, he withdraws his support and throws himself whole-heartedly behind the campaign of Gusty's honourable opponent Norman Prodder.

== Cast ==
- Max Miller as Charles Cromwell
- Chili Bouchier as Sally Green
- H. F. Maltby as Arthur Gusty
- Frederick Burtwell as Norman Prodder
- Norma Varden as Mrs. Prodder
- Allan Jeayes as Bill Johnson
- Winifred Izard as Mrs. Gusty
- Hal Walters as Jack

== Production ==
It was made at Teddington Studios by the British subsidiary of Warner Brothers, with sets were designed by the art directors Peter Proud and Michael Relph.The title song and another within the film were written by Fred Godfrey.

== Reception ==
The Monthly Film Bulletin wrote: "Treated in a purely farcical way, it is somewhat thin entertainment, and Max Miller, who gives of his best, has to carry the whole film."

Kine Weekly wrote: "Exuberant essay in the humours of electioneering with irrepressible Max Miller in the pivotal role. It is, we believe, the star's first song-and-dance show, but he makes a better 'Educated Evans' than a Fred Astaire. Still, such is his resource and capacity for work that he can keep his own end up, if not the picture's. The competent supporting players are, like the star, as good as a transparent story will permit. ... The song numbers are passable and the staging adequate. Photography and technical work are excellent."

Picture Show wrote: "Max Miller is at the top of his form in this comedy. ... He has an excellent supporting cast, and the comedy goes with a swing from beginning to end."
