= Forging Ahead (film) =

1933 film

- Directed by: Norman Walker
- Written by: K.R.G. Browne (novel); Brandon Fleming
- Produced by: Harry Cohen
- Starring: Margot Grahame; Garry Marsh; Anthony Holles
- Production company: Harry Cohen Productions
- Distributed by: Fox Film
- Release date: March 1933
- Running time: 49 minutes
- Country: United Kingdom
- Language: English

Forging Ahead is a 1933 British comedy mystery film directed by Norman Walker and starring Margot Grahame, Garry Marsh and Anthony Holles. It was written by Brandon Fleming based on the play by Fleming and S.W. Carroll, from the novel by K.R.G. Browne. It was made at Wembley Studios as a quota quickie.

== Preservation status ==
The British Film Institute National Archive holds no stills or ephemera, and no film or video materials.

== Synopsis ==
A gang of criminals pretend a house is haunted in order to keep people away

== Cast ==
- Margot Grahame as Crystal Grey
- Garry Marsh as Honorable Horace Slimminger
- Anthony Holles as Percival Custard
- Clifford Heatherley as Professor Bowe
- Clifford Makeham as Abraham Lombard
- Melville Cooper as Smedley
- Edgar Norfolk as Lieutenant-Colonel Fair
- Edith Saville as Lady Leverton

== Reception ==
The Daily Film Renter wrote: "Far-fetched plot runs on conventional lines, but fails to hold the interest owing to inadequate direction, banal dialogue and mediocre acting. May get by with the very uncritical."

Picturegoer wrote: "Very artless comedy put over in a straightforward manner."
