= Edgar Norfolk =

British actor (1893–1980)

Edgar Norfolk (5 November 1893 – 1980) was a British actor.

Norfolk was born Edgar Greenwood. He was the first husband of the actress Helen Saintsbury (a daughter of the actor H.A. Saintsbury).

== Filmography ==
Year	Title	Role	Notes
1932	Hotel Splendide	'Gentleman Charlie'	
1932	Illegal	Lord Alan Sevington	
1932	The Sign of Four	Capt. Morstan	Uncredited
1932	Insult	Captain Jean Conte	
1933	Forging Ahead	Lieutenant-Colonel Fair	
1933	His Grace Gives Notice	Captain Langley	
1934	The Black Abbot	Brian Heslewood	
1934	Tangled Evidence	Dr. Acland	
1935	Sexton Blake and the Mademoiselle	Inspector Thomas	
1936	Men of Yesterday		
1947	The Courtneys of Curzon Street	Mr. W.	
1947	Mine Own Executioner	Sir George Freethorne	
1948	Elizabeth of Ladymead		Uncredited
1949	Silent Dust	Simpson	Uncredited
1953	The Beggar's Opera	5th Turnkey	
1953	Laughing Anne	Conrad's Companion	(final film role)
