= Davina Whitehouse =

New Zealand actor (1912–2002)

Davina Whitehouse OBE
- Publicity still of Davina Craig, 1935
- Born: Eileen Eliza Smith; 16 December 1912; London, England
- Died: 25 December 2002 (aged 90); Auckland, New Zealand
- Other name: Davina Craig
- Citizenship: New Zealand
- Education: Royal Academy of Dramatic Art
- Occupations: Actress; producer; director; author
- Years active: 1932-2001

Davina Whitehouse OBE (born Eileen Eliza Smith; 16 December 1912 – 25 December 2002), also known by the stage name Davina Craig before her marriage, was an English-born actress, acclaimed for her roles on stage and film in her native land in the 1930s and early 1940s and in New Zealand from the 1950s where she continued her career as an actress. She was also a radio and stage producer and director, and from the early 1970s she worked in Australia primarily in television serials.

== Early life and family ==
Born Eileen Eliza Smith in London on 16 December 1912, Whitehouse was the daughter of Scottish-born David Smith and Florence Smith (née King). Her father died when she was two years old, and she was renamed Davina in his memory. Her mother remarried an ex-soldier 10 years later.

In 1941 she married John Henry Archibald Whitehouse, and in 1952 they and their children emigrated to New Zealand. Davina Whitehouse became a naturalised New Zealand citizen in 1977.

== Career ==
=== Britain (1929–1952) ===
Whitehouse having attended a boarding school, was accepted into the Royal Academy of Dramatic Art aged 15, and graduated in 1929. Using the stage name Davina Craig, her acting roles were initially rare, but in 1932 she was seen by Ivor Novello and he offered her a role in a touring play, I Lived with You, which later was made into the 1933 film of the same name, for which Whitehouse receive critical praise. She was then signed by Twickenham Film Studios, and between 1933 and 1939, Whitehouse appeared in over 40 films, most commonly playing a comic servant, but she also had some larger roles, including in The Private Secretary in 1935.

=== New Zealand and Australia (1952–2001) ===
In New Zealand Whitehouse soon gained work as an actor and director of radio drama, and became the executive producer of radio drama for the NZBC. She also acted at Downstage Theatre following its establishment in 1964. In 1984 Whitehouse played Granna in the world premiere of Renée's Wednesday to Come at Downstage Theatre.

Whitehouse's television career began in 1972, appearing in the TV play An Awful Silence. In 1977 became co-host of the TV chat show Two on One with Ray Woolf. For eight years, Whitehouse was a regular panellist on the advice show Beauty and the Beast, hosted by Selwyn Toogood. She had acting roles in New Zealand's first TV soap opera, Close to Home, as well as Country GP, the third season of Gloss (1989), Marlin Bay, and a 30-minute monologue in the series Face Value (1995).

On Australian television, Whitehouse appeared in numerous of the Crawford Productions series, including Matlock Police and The Box, as well as playing the role of Maggie May Kennedy in the Grundy production, Prisoner. She made cameo appearances in films including Sleeping Dogs (1977), Solo (1977), and Braindead (1992). She played a former opera diva in the 1977 Australian TV movie The Night Nurse, and appeared as herself in Peter Jackson's 1995 mockumentary, Forgotten Silver.

Beginning in 1978, Whitehouse served a four-year term on the board of the New Zealand Film Commission.

== Honours and awards ==
Whitehouse won for Best Actor at the 1973 Feltex Awards for her role in An Awful Silence. In 1978 she won the Best Actress "Sammy" for The Night Nurse at the Australian Film and Television Awards.

In the 1985 Queen's Birthday Honours, Whitehouse was appointed an Officer of the Order of the British Empire, for services to the performing arts, and in 1987 she was the subject of an episode of the New Zealand version of This is Your Life. In 1990, Whitehouse was awarded the New Zealand 1990 Commemoration Medal. Whitehouse received a best actress nomination for Face Value at the 1997 New Zealand film and television awards, and she received the Rudall Hayward Award for lifetime achievement in films at the 1998 New Zealand film and television awards.

== Later life and death ==
Whitehouse wrote her autobiography, Davina – An Acting Life, published in 1999. She died on 25 December 2002 in Auckland, following a series of strokes. She was predeceased by her husband, Archie Whitehouse, and survived by their two children, one of whom (Steve) had an illustrious 30 year career working in the UN's radio and television units, where he documented global peacekeeping and humanitarian efforts. He died aged 73.

== Filmography ==
Production	Year
Dark Knight	TV series, 1 episode (2001)
A Twist in the Tale	TV series, 1 episode (1999)
The Legend of William Tell	TV series, 1 episode (1998)
Rugged Gold	TV movie (1994)
Forgotten Silver	(1995)
Braindead	(1992)
Gloss	(TV series, 1987-1990)
Prisoner (TV series, also called Prisoner: Cell Block H)	6 episodes (1983)
The Night Nurse	TV movie (1978)
Solo	(1977)
Young Ramsay (TV series)	1 episode (1977)
Bluey (TV series)	1 episode (1977)
Sleeping Dogs	(1977)
Division 4 (TV series)	1 episode (1975)
Matlock Police (TV series)	, 1 episode, 1975)
The Box (1974) (TV series)	(unknown number of episodes)
I'll Turn to You	(1946)
Tower of Terror	1941 film
My Wife's Family	1941 film
The Farmer's Wife	1941 film
Hoots Mon!	1940 film
Traitor Spy	1939
Anything to Declare?	1938
South Riding	1938 film
London Melody	1937
Sunset in Vienna	1937
Love Up the Pole	1936
Dusty Ermine	1936
Where There's a Will	1936 film
Crown v. Stevens	1936
The Demon Barber of Fleet Street	1936
The Private Secretary	-
Widow's Might	1935
Annie, Leave the Room!	1935
Tangled Evidence	1934
The Black Abbot	1934
Are You a Mason?	1934
The Ghost Camera	1933
I Lived with You	1933
