= Seven Sinners (1936 film) =

- Directed by: Albert de Courville
- Written by: Sidney Gilliat; Frank Launder; Austin Melford (additional dialogue); L. Du Garde Peach (adaptation)
- Based on: play The Wrecker by Arnold Ridley and Bernard Merivale
- Produced by: Michael Balcon
- Starring: Edmund Lowe; Constance Cummings
- Cinematography: Mutz Greenbaum
- Edited by: Michael Gordon
- Music by: Jack Beaver (uncredited)
- Production company: Gaumont British
- Distributed by: Gaumont British Distributors
- Release dates: June 1936 (London); 1947 (reissue)
- Running time: 67 minutes
- Country: United Kingdom
- Language: English

Seven Sinners is a 1936 British thriller film directed by Albert de Courville and starring Edmund Lowe, Constance Cummings and Felix Aylmer. In the U.S. it was known under this title and also as Doomed Cargo. The screenplay concerns an American detective and his sidekick, who travel from France to England to take on a gang of international criminals.

The film was made at Lime Grove Studios by Gainsborough Pictures. Its sets were designed by the Hungarian art director Ernö Metzner.

== Plot ==
During Carnival in Nice, somewhat drunk, New York private detective Ed Harwood accidentally stumbles into the hotel room of Heinrich Wagner, who had helped him earlier that evening. He finds Wagner dead, but by the time he fetches the hotel manager and others, the corpse has disappeared. They all assume Harwood imagined it, including Caryl Fenton, a Worldwide Insurance Company employee sent to take him to Scotland to investigate a robbery.

Unable to convince anyone otherwise, he boards a train with Fenton. However, the train crashes. When Harwood comes to, he finds the missing body nearby. On the dead man's shirt cuff, he finds written an address in Paris; he takes the cuff with him, but the body is afterwards destroyed by fire. He tells Paul Turbé, the assistant prefect of police, his theory that the wreck was deliberate, to try to conceal the murder. Turbé confirms that it was no accident – the railway signals were tampered with – but is skeptical of Harwood's hypothesis. Harwood bets him $5000 that he will catch the killer, and devotes no further attention to the case in Scotland (which is eventually solved without his and Fenton's help).

In Paris, Harwood and Fenton go to the address; they inform the occupant, whose name is Hoyt, that Wagner was killed in the train wreck. The man claims he had not heard of the wreck, although it is the front-page story of the newspapers in his wastebasket. Harwood recognizes a photo of a Buenos Aires racetrack, but the man says it came with the apartment. That night, Harwood breaks into the place, with Fenton in tow. They find the suite almost completely empty of furniture. However, Harwood finds an old banquet invitation from the "Lord Mayor Elect and the Sheriffs of London" to "Axel Hoyt and party". Gunshots from across the street proves that the case is real.

They find a photograph of the banquet, showing Hoyt seated together with Wagner. A woman nearby is wearing a unique dress, which they trace to an Elizabeth Wentworth. At an event for a charity called Pilgrims of Peace, Harwood manages to strike up a conversation with Wentworth. When he remarks that recently he saw her acquaintance, Hoyt, she informs him that Hoyt died three years ago. They trace the doctor responsible for Hoyt's death certificate, but he has been unexpectedly called away to Southampton. They drive off after his train, but he is killed when it crashes into a lorry left on the tracks at a crossing.

While talking to the local chief constable, Harwood is surprised when Turbé shows up. Turbé shows him that the doctor's cuff link looks exactly like Wagner's. In fact, they show the emblem of the Pilgrims of Peace. Harwood and Fenton attend a Pilgrims of Peace rally, where Hoyt is calling himself Father Planchat. They learn that the leaders are about to board a relief ship bound for Bordeaux.

To escape, Harwood starts a brawl. He and Fenton race to catch the boat train, where they encounter both Turbé and the Pilgrims' leaders. Harwood asks Turbé to bring the two Scotland Yard agents in on his signal. Then Harwood and Fenton confront the Pilgrims in the dining car. Harwood has been in touch with the Buenos Aires police: he now accuses the Pilgrims of gunrunning, something Hoyt also did there. However, as Harwood glances at Turbé, he realises that he too was in the banquet photograph, with his back turned. Harwood informs the gang members that Turbé has double-crossed them. He was worried about being exposed, but his associates applied pressure to force him to continue working with them. Instead, he set about killing them all. Turbé uncouples the dining car, leaving it to be destroyed by a following train. The gang try to escape from the front of the car, but the door is locked; they are killed. Harwood and Fenton survive by escaping from the back.

Turbé is killed while trying to escape arrest. Afterward, Harwood and Fenton decide to get married.

== Cast ==
- Edmund Lowe as Edward "Ed" Harwood
- Constance Cummings as Caryl Fenton
- Thomy Bourdelle as Paul Turbé
- Henry Oscar as Axel Hoyt
- Felix Aylmer as Sir Charles Webber
- Joyce Kennedy as Elizabeth Wentworth
- O. B. Clarence as Registrar
- Mark Lester as Chief Constable Captain Fitzgerald
- Allan Jeayes as Heinrich Wagner
- Anthony Holles as Reception Clerk
- David Horne as Hotel Manager
- Edwin Laurence as Guildhall Guide
- James Harcourt as Vicar

== Production ==
The movie was based on a play The Wrecker that had been filmed in 1929.

It was one of the first collaborations between Sidney Gilliat and Frank Launder, and the first time they had been credited as a team, although they were both credited on Facing the music.

Gilliat said he and Launder watched The Wrecker and rewrote L du Garde Peach’s screenplay. "We started with a disappearing body, then had to think up a solution. The first two reels were easy, then we were just making it up as we went along. We would each write a sequence separately, then exchange notes and rewrite it." Gilliat says the film was heavily influenced by American models such as The Thin Man.

Sally Eilers was originally announced to star alongside Edmund Loew. Filming took place in March 1936.

== Critical reception ==
Variety declared "This British effort at a detective story in the light, flippant manner has most of the correct trimmings, but the story doesn’t bear up under the strain... Lowe's lighthearted flatfoot role is nicely worded and that will be ‘Seven Sinners’’ biggest asset on this side. On the other side of the ledger is the case which he solves; it’s too heavy to blend well with a kasicaliy comic characterization."

Evening Standard called it "a clean, clever piece of work."

Frank Nugent, The New York Times critic, called it "a crisp, humorous and deftly turned murder mystery" and noted "an unmistakable resemblance to the Hitchcock melodrama [The 39 Steps] in the picture's rapid direction, urbanity and cleverness."

== Bibliography ==
- Low, Rachael. Filmmaking in 1930s Britain. George Allen & Unwin, 1985.
- Wood, Linda. British Films, 1927-1939. British Film Institute, 1986.
