= Sexton Blake and the Mademoiselle =

- Directed by: Alex Bryce
- Screenplay by: Michael Barringer
- Based on: They Shall Repay by G. H. Teed
- Produced by: Michael Barringer
- Starring: George Curzon; Edgar Norfolk; Raymond Lovell
- Cinematography: Alex Bryce
- Production companies: 20th Century Fox; Fox Film
- Distributed by: Metro-Goldwyn-Mayer (UK)
- Release date: October 1935 (UK)
- Running time: 63 minutes
- Country: United Kingdom
- Language: English

Sexton Blake and the Mademoiselle (also known as Sexton Blake and Mademoiselle) is a 1935 British crime film directed by Alex Bryce and starring George Curzon, Lorraine Grey, Edgar Norfolk and Raymond Lovell. It was written by Michael Barringer based on the 1930 story "They Shall Repay" by G. H. Teed.

== Preservation status ==
The British Film Institute National Archive holds a collection of stills but no film or video materials.

== Premise ==
Blake must discover who has stolen from a wealthy financier – and discovers a mysterious woman behind the crime.

== Cast ==
- George Curzon as Sexton Blake
- Lorraine Grey as Mademoiselle Roxanne
- Tony Sympson as Tinker
- Edgar Norfolk as Inspector Thomas
- Raymond Lovell as Captain
- Ian Fleming as Henry Norman
- Vincent Holman as Carruthers
- Wilson Coleman as Pierre

== Critical reception ==
Kine Weekly wrote: "Alex Bryce wastes no time on frills, but relies almost entirely om illustrated dialogue in telling his story, which, however, is quite clear and not wanting in interest. There as a dash of mild humour and a somewhat disarming 'niceness' about the characters, including the so-called undesirables. Dialogue is profuse and generally natural."

The Daily Film Renter wrote: "Presented to the tune of robust action, the piece should prove acceptable fare for Blake fans, who will be able to find few flaws in the smooth portrayal of the sleuth by George Curzon, who repeats the part he essayed in a previous screen adventure of the Baker Street 'tec. Lorraine Grey, who appears as Roxane, is perhaps a trifle inexperienced, but Tony Sympson is a pleasing Tinker, and Raymond Lovell has his moments as one of the principal heavies."

TV Guide called it "A likable film with the enjoyable Curzon again tackling his Sexton Blake role."
