= Solo (1977 film) =

1977 New Zealand romantic comedy

- Directed by: Tony Williams
- Written by: Martyn Sanderson, Tony Williams
- Starring: Vincent Gil, Lisa Peers, Martyn Sanderson, Davina Whitehouse, Maxwell Fernie, Perry Armstrong, Frances Edmond, Uncle Roy, Jock Spence, Gillian Hope, Veronica Lawrence, Val Murphy
- Music by: Robbie Laven & Marion Arts - Theme "Mirage"; Dave Fraser; Chopin; Furber Meyer & Charig
- Release date: 1977
- Countries: New Zealand; Australia
- Language: English
- Budget: $140,000

Solo is a 1977 New Zealand romantic comedy film directed by Tony Williams. The plot concerns a hitchhiker who falls for a pilot.

== Cast ==
- Vincent Gil as Paul Robinson
- Lisa Peers as Judy Ballantyne
- Martyn Sanderson as Jules Catweazle
- Davina Whitehouse as Rohana Beaulieu
- Maxwell Fernie as Crispin Beaulieu
- Perry Armstrong as Billy Robinson
- Frances Edmond as School teacher
- Uncle Roy as Man on bike
- Jock Spence as Radio operator
- Gillian Hope as Woman on train
- Veronica Lawrence as Sue
- Val Murphy as Anita
