= Tony Sympson =

British actor (1906–1983)

- Born: Herbert George Sympson; 10 July 1906; London, England
- Died: 30 March 1983 (aged 76); Westminster, London, England
- Occupation: Actor
- Spouse: Florence Kettle (m. 1946)

Tony Sympson (10 July 1906 – 30 March 1983) was a British actor.

== Selected filmography ==
Year	Title	Role	Notes
1932	The Indiscretions of Eve	Pip	
1935	Sexton Blake and the Mademoiselle	Tinker	
1935	Sexton Blake and the Bearded Doctor	Tinker	
1936	Rhythm in the Air	Alf Higgins	
1937	The Mutiny of the Elsinore	Shorty Peabody	
1938	The Challenge	Luc Meynet	
1938	Sexton Blake and the Hooded Terror	Tinker	
1950	Night and the City	Cozen	Uncredited
1953	Street of Shadows	Nikki	
1954	Devil on Horseback	Musician	
1955	Little Red Monkey	Cab Driver	Uncredited
1955	Dial 999	Harry Briggs	Uncredited
1956	Keep It Clean	Little Tailor	
1957	The Counterfeit Plan	Grune	
1966	The Ghost Goes Gear	Lord Plumley	
1968	Diamonds for Breakfast	Anastasia's Manservant	Uncredited
1969	Lock Up Your Daughters!	Clerk of the Court	
1973	Tiffany Jones	Prim Man	
1973	The Wicker Man	Piano Player	Scene deleted
1974	House of Whipcord	Henry	
1975	Eskimo Nell	Grandfather	
1975	The Adventure of Sherlock Holmes' Smarter Brother	Opera Conductor	
1976	The Pink Panther Strikes Again	Mr. Shork	
1977	Jabberwocky	Third Peasant	
1980	Sir Henry at Rawlinson End	Old Man	

== Selected television ==
Year	Title	Role	Notes
1955-1957	BBC Sunday Night Theatre	Various	3 episodes
1956-1957	ITV Television Playhouse	Pelling/Court Usher	2 episodes
1957	ITV Play of the Week	Morten Kiil	Episode: An Enemy of the People
1958	Dial 999	Cashier	Episode: "Special Edition"
1959	Dixon of Dock Green	Little Bert	Episode: "Send for Santa Claus"
1960	Barnaby Rudge	Tom Cobb	4 episodes
1960	Saturday Playhouse	Albert	Episode: "The Return of Peggy Atherton"
1960	BBC Sunday-Night Play	Gus Elen	Episode: "Tuppence in the Gods"
1961-1962	No Hiding Place	Ned/Mr. Fowler	2 episodes
1963	Ghost Squad	The Fisherman	Episode: "Mr. Five Percent"
1965	Thursday Theatre	Waiter	Episode: "Anatol"
1966	Softly, Softly	Simms	Episode: "Tickle on Wheels"
1970	Oh Brother!	Cardinal	Episode: "A Fool Returneth"
1970	Comedy Playhouse	Thatcher	Episode: "Haven of Rest"
1970-1971	Bright's Boffins	Various	9 episodes
1970-1975	Comedy Playhouse	Thatcher	2 episodes
1972-1973	Sykes	Landowner	3 episodes
1975	The Sweeney	The Old Man	Episode: "Night Out"
1975	Dawson's Weekly	Call Boy	Episode: "Stage-Struck"
1976-1983	Are You Being Served?	Various	3 episodes
1976	The Fall and Rise of Reginald Perrin	Uncle Percy Spillinger	Episode Four
1976	BBC2 Playhouse	Mr. Gee	Episode: "The Mind Beyond: The Love of a Good Woman"
1978	All Creatures Great and Small	Cliff Tyreman	Episode: "The Beauty of the Beast"
1980	Oh Happy Band!	Mr. Giles	
1980	Shillingbury Tales	Basil	Episode: "The Shillingbury Blowers"
1981	Great Expectations	Aged Parent	2 episodes
1982	BBC Television Shakespeare	Second Servant	Episode: King Lear
1982	The Young Ones	Old Man at DHSS	Episode: "Bomb"
1983	Play for Today	Owen	Episode: "Shall I Be Mother?"
