= Dangerous Medicine =

1938 British film by Arthur B. Woods

- Directed by: Arthur B. Woods
- Written by: Paul England; Paul Gangelin
- Produced by: Jerome Jackson
- Starring: Elizabeth Allan; Cyril Ritchard
- Cinematography: Basil Emmott
- Distributed by: Warner Brothers-First National Productions
- Release date: August 1938
- Running time: 72 minutes
- Country: United Kingdom
- Language: English

Dangerous Medicine is a 1938 British crime film directed by Arthur B. Woods and starring Elizabeth Allan and Cyril Ritchard. It was written by Paul England and Paul Gangelin.

== Preservation status ==
The British Film Institute has classed Dangerous Medicine as a lost film. Its National Archive holds no film or video materials.

== Plot ==
Secretary Victoria Ainswell marries her wealthy elderly boss. Soon after the wedding he dies suddenly in suspicious circumstances, and the autopsy reveals that the police have a murderer on their hands. Everything points to Victoria as the only person with means, opportunity and motive, and as she can provide no sensible explanation as to who else could have killed her husband, she is arrested and put on trial for murder.

Victoria is found guilty and sentenced to hang. As she is being driven back to prison, the car is involved in a serious road accident. Victoria is critically injured and is rushed to hospital, where brilliant doctor Noel Penwood fights desperately against the odds to save her life. He finds a shard of glass has pierced her heart, and has to perform extremely risky surgery to remove it.

Once the operation is over and Victoria is off the danger list, Penwood learns that she faces execution. He is appalled by the horrendous irony that he has saved her life so heroically, only for it to soon be taken anyway through process of law. As Victoria recovers, he listens to her story, believes in her innocence and starts to fall in love with her. Against all ethics, he smuggles her out of the hospital and puts her in hiding. The now romantically-involved couple do some sleuthing of their own, and finally stumble on the identity of the real killer. The police are extremely grateful and apologetic, and Victoria is exonerated, leaving her free to pursue the romance with Penwood.

== Cast ==
- Elizabeth Allan as Victoria Ainswell
- Cyril Ritchard as Dr. Noel Penwood
- Edmund Breon as Totsie Mainwaring
- Anthony Holles as Alistair Hoard
- Aubrey Mallalieu as Judge
- Basil Gill as Sir Francis
- Leo Genn as Murdoch
- Gordon McLeod as Mr. Buller
- Frederick Burtwell as Mr. George
- Allan Jeayes as Superintendent Fox

== Reception ==
The Monthly Film Bulletin wrote: "This improbable story is briskly told, and opens with a clever and ingeniously staged scene at the Old Bailey. Resourceful direction, crisp and pointed dialogue, pleasant comedy, and adequate suspense make this film thoroughly amusing entertainment. ... Elizabeth Allan is competent as Vicky, and Cyril Ritchard is quite an attractive hero. Edmond Breon as Totsie steals every scene in which he appears ... The settings are varied and attractive, and the production qualities excellent."

Kine Weekly wrote: "The story is somewhat extravagant, but resourceful team work, pugilistic direction and mobile development nevertheless convert wild improbabilities into good hearty fun. Mass, family and industrial appeal is evenly distributed."

The Daily Film Renter wrote: "Briskly told and well-knit story ... Gripping Old Bailey trial sequences get proceedings under way, while ensuing development packs thrill of police hue and cry for escaped heroine, climax seeing real killer trapped into confession. Amusing comedy leavening, romantic side issue, and pleasantly varied settings. Attractive entertainment, well suited to the popular bill."
