= An Awful Silence =

- Directed by: David Stevens
- Written by: Vincent Ley
- Produced by: David Stevens
- Starring: Davina Whitehouse
- Cinematography: Warren LePine
- Edited by: Simon Reece
- Music by: Ian McDonald
- Release date: December 1, 1972
- Running time: 52 min
- Country: New Zealand
- Language: English

An Awful Silence is a 1972 New Zealand television film. It is a science fiction film produced by N.Z.B.C. It was filmed in colour with a script that won the 1971 Ngaio Marsh television play contest. A key location for the film was an Edwardian style house in Lower Hutt.

== Cast ==
- Davina Whitehouse as Mrs. Oliver
- David Tinkham as Dr. Tree
- Hazel Cole as Sarah Alright
- Alan Jervis as Detective Inspector Puttick
- Susan Wilson as Jane McCarthy
- Michael Morrissey as Detective Sergeant Aldrich
- Grant Tilly as Mr. Beech
- Ken Blackburn as Mr. Redwood
- Paul Holmes as Mr. Holly

== Reception ==
The Press said it "will probably rank as the best N.Z.B.C. television production to have come to our screens." They note "It scored on almost every front imaginable. Although it was a weird and incredible story, it seemed real enough, because the dialogue was easy and natural, with no verbal pyrotechnics, no pretentious passages. The words matched the people, and stayed with them."

== Awards ==
Feltex Television Awards 1973

- Best Drama and the Arts - An Awful Silence - won
- Best Actor - Davina Whitehouse - won
