= The Black Abbot (1934 film) =

1934 British film by George A. Cooper

- Opening title card
- Directed by: George A. Cooper
- Written by: Terence Egan; Philip Godfrey
- Produced by: Julius Hagen
- Starring: John Stuart; Judy Kelly; Richard Cooper
- Cinematography: Ernest Palmer
- Edited by: Lister Laurance
- Production company: Twickenham Studios
- Distributed by: RKO
- Release date: 8 January 1934
- Running time: 56 minutes
- Country: United Kingdom
- Language: English

The Black Abbot is a 1934 British comedy-crime film directed by George A. Cooper and starring John Stuart, Judy Kelly and Edgar Norfolk. It was written by Terence Egan and Philip Godfrey.

== Plot ==
Soon after wealthy John Hillcrist and his family move into their newly-bought and allegedly haunted country mansion, Hillcrist is kidnapped and held to ransom. American private eye Charlie Marsh investigates.

== Cast ==
- John Stuart as Frank Brooks
- Judy Kelly as Sylvia Hillcrest
- Edgar Norfolk as Brian Heslewood
- Richard Cooper as Lord Jerry Pilkdown
- Drusilla Wills as Mary Hillcrist
- Farren Soutar as John Hillcrist
- Cyril Smith as Alf Higgins
- Davina Craig as Jane, the maid
- Earl Grey as Phillips, the butler
- Ben Welden as Charlie Marsh
- John Turnbull as Inspector Lockwood

== Production ==
It was made at Twickenham Studios as a quota quickie for release by RKO Pictures.

The film's sets were designed by the art director James A. Carter.

== Reception ==
Kine Weekly wrote: "Unpretentious crime drama, conventional spot 'the-culprit' stuff, not particularly strong in dramatic, values, but sufficiently mystifying in its development to hold, the interest and enable the ending to occasion surprise. ... John Stuart is quite good as the hero; Judy Kelly is an attractive heroine, Richard Cooper is effective in a silly ass role, and the others are satisfactory. ... The story, a mechanical one, is a trifle involved, but its complexities nevertheless pave the way to new exciting situations which culminate with the customary thrill."

Picturegoer wrote: "John Stuart does well and Judy Kelly makes an attractive heroine in a conventional machine-made 'spot the criminal' story, which is weak dramatically and lacking in imaginative treatment. There is a certain amount of surprise element."

The Daily Film Renter wrote: "Film moves sluggishly, owing to overmuch dialogue, and climax lacks suspense values. Richard Cooper and Judy Kelly give best performances with material available. ... There is nothing strikingly original about this story, which follows familiar paths, in that suspicion is diverted into several unlikely channels before the denouement. Direction is on the slow side, while the unmasking lacks dramatic punch. Judy Kelly, as Sylvia, has little to do, although she manages to do that little well, Richard Cooper wanders in and out the plot as an asinine peer, a role that is right up his alley."
