= Anthony Holles (actor) =

British actor (1901–1950)

- in Millions (1937)
- Born: Antony Hamilton Holles; 17 January 1901; Fulham, London, United Kingdom
- Died: 5 March 1950 (aged 49); Marylebone, London, United Kingdom
- Occupation: actor
- Years active: 1921-1950

Antony Hamilton Holles (17 January 1901, Fulham, London- 5 March 1950, Marylebone, London) was a British stage and film actor. Educated at Latymer School, Holles was on stage from 1916 in Charley's Aunt. He was the son of the actor William Holles (1867-1947) and his wife Nannie Goldman.

His West End roles included appearances in Sorry You've Been Troubled (1929), Good Losers, (1931), Take a Chance (1931), Libel! (1934), The Composite Man (1936) and Tony Draws a Horse (1939).

== Selected filmography ==
- The Will (1921) - Charles Ross
- The Missing Rembrandt (1932) - Marquess de Chaminade
- Once Bitten (1932) - Legros
- Life Goes On (1932) - John Collis
- The Star Reporter (1932, Short) - Bonzo
- The Mayor's Nest (1932) - Saxophonist in Paradise Row Band (uncredited)
- Hotel Splendide (1932) - 'Mrs.LeGrange'
- The Lodger (1932) - Silvono
- Watch Beverly (1932) - Arthur Briden
- Reunion (1932) - Padre
- The Midshipmaid (1932) - Lt. Kingsford
- She Was Only a Village Maiden (1933) - Vicar
- Forging Ahead (1933) - Percival Custard
- Cash (1933) - Inspector
- Loyalties (1933) - Ricardos
- Britannia of Billingsgate (1933) - Guidobaldi
- That's a Good Girl (1933) - Canzone
- Borrowed Clothes (1934) - Gilbert Pinkley
- Something Always Happens (1934) - Tony (uncredited)
- Nell Gwynn (1934) - Actor At Drury Lane (uncredited)
- The Green Pack (1934) - Inspector Aguilar
- Road House (1934) - Receptionist at Hotel Splendide (uncredited)
- Brewster's Millions (1935) - Ferago, the Mayor
- Drake the Pirate (1935) - English Spy (uncredited)
- Look Up and Laugh (1935) - Store Manager (uncredited)
- The Phantom Light (1935) - Mr. Mason (uncredited)
- Gentlemen's Agreement (1935) - Bill Bentley
- Things to Come (1936) - Simon Burton (uncredited)
- Public Nuisance No. 1 (1936) - Head Waiter
- It's Love Again (1936) - Headwaiter (uncredited)
- Seven Sinners (1936) - Reception Clerk
- The Gay Adventure (1936) - Charles
- The Tenth Man (1936) - Swalescliffe
- This'll Make You Whistle (1936) - Sebastian Venables
- Talk of the Devil (1936) - Colquhoun
- Sensation (1936) - Clake
- Conquest of the Air (1936) - Paul Bleylich-Lilienthal's mechanic (uncredited)
- Action for Slander (1937) - John Grant
- Dark Journey (1937) - Dutchman
- Glamorous Night (1937) - Maestro
- Big Fella (1937) - Gendarme (uncredited)
- Limelight (1937) - Impresario
- Let's Make a Night of It (1937) - Head Waiter
- Smash and Grab (1937) - Polino
- Under Secret Orders (1937) - Mario
- Paradise for Two (1937) - Brand
- Millions (1937) - Billy Todd
- Romance à la carte (1938) - Rudolph
- His Lordship Regrets (1938) - Guy Reading
- Dangerous Medicine (1938) - Alistair Hoard
- Weddings Are Wonderful (1938) - Adolph
- They Drive by Night (1938) - Murray
- The Sky's the Limit (1938) - Marillo
- Miracles Do Happen (1938) - Proctor
- Black Limelight (1939) - Urcher (uncredited)
- Over the Moon (1939) - Gondolier (uncredited)
- Black Eyes (1939) - Reprimanded Waiter (uncredited)
- The Missing People (1940) - Ernest Bronstone
- Down Our Alley (1939) - Tony
- Blind Folly (1939) - Louis
- The Spider (1940) - Bath's manager
- Ten Days in Paris (1940) - Francois
- Neutral Port (1940) - Chief of Police
- Front Line Kids (1942) - Hotelier
- Uncensored (1942) - (uncredited)
- Lady from Lisbon (1942) - Tony Anzoni
- Talk About Jacqueline (1942) - Attendant
- Tomorrow We Live (1943) - Stationmaster
- Thursday's Child (1943) - Roy Todd
- Warn That Man (1943) - Waiter
- Schweik's New Adventures (1943) - Opera manager
- They Met in the Dark (1943) - Hotel Hairdresser
- Up with the Lark (1943) - Martel
- Old Mother Riley Overseas (1943)
- Battle for Music (1943)
- It's in the Bag (1944) - Costumier
- A Canterbury Tale (1944) - Sergt. Bassett
- English Without Tears (1944) - (uncredited)
- Give Me the Stars (1945) - Achille Lebrun
- Caesar and Cleopatra (1945) - Boatman
- They Knew Mr. Knight (1946) - Station Master
- Gaiety George (1946) - Wade
- The Magic Bow (1946) - Manager
- Carnival (1946) - Corentin
- Fortune Lane (1947) - Mr. Carpenter
- The Dark Road (1948)
- Bonnie Prince Charlie (1948) - Col. Warren (uncredited)
- The Rocking Horse Winner (1949) - Bowler Hat (uncredited)
- Traveller's Joy (1949) - Head Waiter (final film role)
