= Caste (1930 film) =

1930 British film by Campbell Gullan

- Flyer
- Directed by: Campbell Gullan
- Screenplay by: Michael Powell
- Based on: the play Caste by T.W. Robertson
- Produced by: Jerome Jackson
- Starring: Hermione Baddeley; Nora Swinburne; Alan Napier
- Production company: Harry Rowson Productions
- Distributed by: United Artists
- Release date: September 1930
- Running time: 70 minutes
- Country: United Kingdom
- Language: English

Caste is a 1930 British drama film directed by Campbell Gullan and starring Hermione Baddeley, Nora Swinburne and Alan Napier. It was made at Walton Studios. Michael Powell worked on the screenplay and (uncredited) was involved with the technical side of direction.

== Cast ==
- Hermione Baddeley as Polly Eccles
- Nora Swinburne as Esther Eccles
- Alan Napier as Capt. Hawtree
- Sebastian Shaw as Hon. George d'Alroy
- Ben Field as Albert Eccles
- Edward Chapman as Sam Gerridge
- Mabel Terry-Lewis as Marquise
- Percival Coyte

== Critical reception ==
Film historian Geoff Brown writes, "most of the film’s enlivening spice comes from the jolting surprises of tone and manner as Gullan’s cast and Powell’s visuals glide or lurch through a scenario pleasingly punctured with camera trackings, lively spots of audiovisual montage and dramatically piquant closeups. (Watch for the carefully judged shots of hands delivering and receiving a crucial telegram regarding D’Alroy’s fate.)...the film is not a fossil; it is a lively embryo, and the first important step towards Powell’s future."

== Bibliography ==
- Low, Rachael. Filmmaking in 1930s Britain. George Allen & Unwin, 1985.
- Wood, Linda. British Films, 1927-1939. British Film Institute, 1986.
