= Jerome Jackson (producer) =

American film producer (1898–1940)

Jerome Jackson (1898–1940) was an American film producer and script writer.

He worked with the director Michael Powell, producing many of the quota quickies Powell made during the 1930s.

== Selected filmography ==
- A Knight in London (1929)
- Caste (1930)
- Two Crowded Hours (1931)
- My Friend the King (1932)
- The Rasp (1932)
- Rynox (1932)
- The Star Reporter (1932)
- Hotel Splendide (1932)
- C.O.D. (1932)
- His Lordship (1932)
- Born Lucky (1933)
- The Fire Raisers (1934)
- Red Ensign (1934)
- Road House (1934)
- Heat Wave (1935)
- The Night of the Party (1935)
- The Phantom Light (1935)
- Twelve Good Men (1936)
- Hail and Farewell (1936)
- The Return of Carol Deane (1938)
- Dangerous Medicine (1938)
- Many Tanks Mr. Atkins (1938)
- Everything Happens to Me (1938)
- Too Dangerous to Live (1939)
