= The Star Reporter =

1932 film

- Trade advertisement
- Directed by: Michael Powell
- Written by: Ralph Smart; Philip MacDonald
- Produced by: Jerome Jackson
- Starring: Harold French; Garry Marsh
- Cinematography: Geoffrey Faithfull
- Distributed by: Film Engineering
- Release date: 9 May 1932
- Running time: 44 minutes
- Country: United Kingdom
- Language: English

The Star Reporter (also known as Star Reporter) is a lost 1932 British crime drama film, directed by Michael Powell and starring Harold French and Garry Marsh. The screenplay was by Ralph Smart and Philip MacDonald adapted from a story by MacDonald.

== Preservation status ==
The British Film Institute has classed The Star Reporter as a lost film. Its National Archive holds a collection of stills but no film or video materials. It is one of eleven quota quickies directed by Powell between 1931 and 1936 of which no print is known to survive.

== Plot ==
Major Starr is an ambitious newspaper reporter who has taken undercover employment as chauffeur to Lady Susan Loman in the hope of witnessing high-society goings-on which he can use in a feature article he is planning. Lady Susan's father Lord Longbourne meanwhile is experiencing financial embarrassment, and is persuaded by professional criminal Mandel to conspire in an insurance scam whereby Mandel will steal a diamond belonging to Lady Susan from the West End jeweller where it is currently on display, Longbourne will claim the cash and Mandel will return the diamond to him for a cut of the proceeds.

Mandel steals the diamond in an audacious smash-and-grab raid but the crime is witnessed by Starr and Lady Susan, who happen to be passing at the time. Starr heads off in pursuit of Mandel and corners him on a rooftop. There is a struggle and Mandel falls to his death. With the scam foiled and the diamond retrieved, Starr proposes to Lady Susan, who is happy to accept.

== Cast ==
- Harold French as Major Starr
- Garry Marsh as Mandel
- Isla Bevan as Lady Susan Loman
- Spencer Trevor as Lord Longbourne
- Anthony Holles as Bonzo
- Noel Dainton as Colonel
- Elsa Graves as Oliver
- Philip Morant as Jeff

== Production ==
Powell rented a hand-held camera for £8 and travelled to Southampton to film a docking ocean liner for use in an intercut scene. He wrote in his autobiography: "Star Reporter was fun ... and I was not ashamed of it. ... Star Reporter played as the bottom half of the bill with Frank Capra's Platinum Blonde. I felt really complimented when one of the critics wrote that Star Reporter scarcely had the polish of Platinum Blonde. My film cost £3,700, the Columbia film $600,000."

== Reception ==
Film Weekly wrote: "Michael Powell is the man who makes things move in this somewhat crude but effective 'three-quarter' size talkie. His direction of an ordinary story, and the deft manipulation of his players, is ingenious and enterprising, and the entertainment values of The Star Reporter owe much to him."

Today's Cinema assessed it as: "cleverly directed on the lines of swift action, snappy dialogue and varied settings."

The Evening News wrote: "'At the end of a long and not very inspiring day of seeing new films, I saw a little picture Star Reporter which jolted my tired brain into renewed enthusiasm. Star Reporter packs into three-quarters of an hour as much story as most films that last an hour and a half... (it) tells an exciting crook story with a smoothness of direction and a crispness of acting and cutting which would be a credit to the most ambitious picture."

The Daily Film Renter wrote: "Frankly a fictional episode, garnished with jewel thieves and a chase-over-theroofs thrill, done in the good old-fashioned way, Star Reporter is a picture that will make a good getaway with the crowd. The story is plain, its thrills are plain, and its acting is plain. It imposes no strain on the intelligence whichever way it is considered."

Picturegoer wrote: "Pretentious and fantastic story of a smash-and-grab raid, with a newspaper reporter – following the American tradition – bringing the crooks to justice. It is all very ingenuous and is chiefly notable for the introduction of Isla Bevan, a new star, who looks like making good. Garry Marsh and Harold French both put up good performances, and the picture generally is quite fairly entertaining, if one is not too critical."
