= Sally Belfrage =

American journalist (1936–1994)

Sally Belfrage

Sally Belfrage (October 4, 1936 – March 14, 1994) was an American-born, British-based 20th century non-fiction writer and international journalist. Her writing covered The Troubles in Northern Ireland, and the U.S. Civil Rights Movement. Her 1981 memoir Flowers of Emptiness was praised as the work of "an intelligent and humorous journalist and critic who ardently searched for the truth".

== Life and work ==
Sally Mary Caroline Belfrage was born in Hollywood, California, on 4 October 1936. Her parents, Cedric Belfrage and Molly Castle, later moved to New York where she studied at the Bronx High School of Science and Hunter College. She returned to England when her parents were deported to London as alleged Communists. After her return, she matriculated at the London School of Economics. Following graduation, she became a social activist and world traveller. She attended the 6th World Festival of Youth and Students in Moscow, visited China, and worked in 1957 for the Foreign Languages Publishing House in Moscow.

Her books included A Room in Moscow (1958), Flowers of Emptiness: Reflections on an Ashram (1981), The Crack: A Belfast Year (1987, retitled Living with War: A Belfast Year for United States distribution), Un-American Activities: A Memoir of the Fifties (1995), and Freedom Summer (1999). In 1969, she signed a war tax resistance vow, along with 447 other American writers and editors. It was published in the January 30, 1969 edition of the New York Post.

=== Death ===
Belfrage lived most of her life in London, where she died at Middlesex Hospital from lung cancer (adenocarcinoma) in 1994, at age 57.

== Personal life ==
=== Marriage and family ===
In 1965, Belfrage married Bernard Pomerance who was best known for his play, The Elephant Man. They had two children: Eve Pomerance, a casting director, screenwriter and producer in Hollywood, and Moby Pomerance, a playwright and screenwriter.

Her brother was Nicolas Belfrage, a Master of Wine and wine critic. Her uncle was Bruce Belfrage, a BBC newsreader during World War II, and her great-uncle was Bryan Powley, an actor.
