= Born Lucky =

1933 film by Michael Powell

- Rene Ray and Talbot O'Farrell in a scene from the film
- Directed by: Michael Powell
- Written by: Ralph Smart
- Produced by: Jerome Jackson
- Starring: Rene Ray; John Longden
- Cinematography: Geoffrey Faithfull
- Distributed by: Westminster Films
- Release date: 6 April 1933
- Running time: 78 minutes
- Country: United Kingdom
- Language: English

Born Lucky is a lost 1933 British quota quickie rags to riches musical-comedy drama, directed by Michael Powell and starring Rene Ray and John Longden. The screenplay was by Ralph Smart, adapted from the 1928 novel Mops by Marguerite Florence Barclay. It was the first film that the cinematographer Oswald Morris worked on as a clapper boy.

== Preservation status ==
The British Film Institute has classed Born Lucky as a lost film. Its National Archive holds a collection of stills but no film or video materials.

== Plot ==
Mops, so called because of her striking curly hair, is an orphan living in the East End of London with her guardian Turnips, whose nickname derives from his craft of carving flowers out of vegetables, which he sells to earn a few extra coppers to augment his income as a lighting-man at the local music hall. Mops performs there and earns a living wage, but has to contend with the unwanted advances of the manager. When he tries to force himself on her, Turnips beats him up and both he and Mops are sacked.

Unable to pay the rent, they are turned out of their home and decide to head off for Kent, where they know there is seasonal work to be found picking hops. The work is hard and ill-paid, and finding enough to eat is a problem. Mops strikes up a friendship with a younger itinerant, who seems downhearted but is soon cheered up. One evening Turnips goes to a bakery to buy a loaf but does not have enough money. He begins to argue and a fight breaks out; Turnips is arrested and sentenced to a term of imprisonment. Mops visits him in the cells and he suggests she return to London and register with a training centre to try to obtain a position in service.

Having taken the advice, Mops finds a place as kitchen-maid with Lady Chard. As the lowest in the servants' pecking-order she is given the most menial jobs and is bullied by more senior domestics. Early one morning when she is alone in the kitchen she hears a knock, and opens the door to find the man she befriended on the road. She helps him out of a predicament, and they begin walking out together after he successfully applies for a position with playwright Frank Dale. Some time later Mops is dismissed from her post after being blamed for starting a fire in the house. She goes to visit her beau, and finds him smartly-dressed and in conversation with a theatrical impresario. He admits that he is really Frank Dale, and all along he has been using her as research material for his new play. On being told of Mops' music hall background, Frank and the impresario offer her the lead role in the play. Both the play and Mops are overnight sensations, and she is welcomed by society. After Frank has rid himself of his grasping fiancée, and Mops has exacted her revenge on the magistrate who imprisoned Turnips, the couple are married and the future looks bright for them and the newly released Turnips.

== Cast ==
- Rene Ray as Mops
- John Longden as Frank Dale
- Talbot O'Farrell as Turnips
- Ben Welden as Harriman
- Barbara Gott as Cook
- Helen Ferrers as Lady Chard
- Roland Gillett as John Chard
- Paddy Brown as Patty

== Reception ==
Kine Weekly wrote: "Ingenuous comedy, a simple story of a humble girl's rise to stage fame, garnished with music, song, below-stairs humour and naive romance. The picture's presentation is wide, but the treatment shows some imagination, if the stars shine but dimly. ... Too much incident has been crowded into this picture. The star work works hard but lacks the experience to carry the entertainment on her slender shoulders, and, as a result, the film lacks smooth cohesion."

Picturegoer wrote: "It is all very naïve and the continuity is rather ragged owing to an excess of varied detail which makes for lack of cohesion."

Picture Show wrote: "Naive story of a servant-girl who becomes a stage star. It provides pleasant entertainment with its touches of Cockney humour, romance, sentiment and song."
