= Red Ensign (film) =

1934 film

- Red Ensign video cover: Barr confronts Manning's rabble-rouser
- Directed by: Michael Powell
- Written by: Jerome Jackson; L. du Garde Peach; Michael Powell
- Produced by: Jerome Jackson
- Starring: Leslie Banks; Carol Goodner; Frank Vosper; Alfred Drayton; Donald Calthrop
- Cinematography: Leslie Rowson
- Edited by: Geoffrey Barkas
- Distributed by: Gaumont British Picture Corporation Ltd
- Release date: June 1934 (UK)
- Running time: 66 minutes
- Country: United Kingdom
- Language: English
- Budget: £12,000 (estimated)

Red Ensign is a 1934 film directed by British filmmaker Michael Powell. It is an early low-budget "quota quickie".

== Plot ==
In 1933, David Barr is the manager and chief designer of Glasgow shipbuilding firm Burns, McKinnon & Co. He comes up with a radical new ship design that can carry 25% more cargo for the tonnage and use less fuel at a time when the industry as a whole is in recession. Barr decides to build not just one ship, as Lord Dean advises, but twenty (to bring the costs down to a manageable level). Manning, a rival shipbuilder Barr loathes, hears rumors and sends two men undercover to find out what they can. They manage to get themselves hired. Manning then offers to purchase either the design or all the ships they can build. Both offers are rejected.

With the support of June McKinnon, the chief shareholder, Barr proceeds, despite the opposition of Lord Dean and other members of the board. He receives a severe setback when the Government declines to give him a contract or pass a shipping bill, and is driven to use his own money to try to complete the ship. When he runs out and cannot secure a loan to cover the payroll, a rabble-rouser tries to stir up the men, but Barr convinces them to stick by him. June, having heard his rousing speech, offers to let him obtain a loan on the security of her trust fund.

Manning's men knock out the night watchman and blow up the ship being built; a man named MacLeod is killed. Bassett, a reporter, informs Barr that MacLeod was third officer on one of Manning's ships.

Now needing funds desperately, Barr forges Lord Dean's signature to obtain a loan when Dean, as a trustee of June's trust, refuses to cooperate (partly out of jealousy of Barr and June's developing relationship). Manning finds out and tries to blackmail Barr into selling the design, but Barr refuses to do so and is convicted of forgery. Later, however, Manning is sought for manslaughter, while Barr is present when June launches the first of the new ships, the SS David Barr.

== Cast ==
- Leslie Banks as David Barr
- Carol Goodner as June MacKinnon
- Frank Vosper as Lord Dean
- Alfred Drayton as Manning
- Campbell Gullan as Hannay, a shipyard worker
- Percy Parsons as Casey, one of Manning's undercover troublemakers
- Fewlass Llewellyn as Sir Gregory, a member of the company's board
- Henry Oscar as Raglan, a member of the board
- Allan Jeayes as Grierson
- Donald Calthrop as MacLeod, another of Manning's saboteurs
- Henry Caine as Bassett
- George Carney as Mr. Lindsey, a publican (uncredited)
- Jack Lambert as Police Inspector (uncredited)
- John Laurie as Wages Accountant (uncredited)
- Frederick Piper as Mr. McWilliams (uncredited)
- Jack Raine as Testing Official (uncredited)

== Production ==
Red Ensign was Powell's 12th film in four years. "It was the first time that Michael Powell himself realised that there was something special about a Michael Powell film, something going on on the screen, or behind the screen, which you couldn't put your finger on, something intriguing, aloof, but in the long run memorable."

== Analysis ==
The character of David Barr is seen as an early precursor of Powell's own alter-ego in Michael Powell films such as Eric Portman's Colpeper in A Canterbury Tale (1944) and Roger Livesey's Dr Reeves in A Matter of Life and Death (1946). Indeed the whole film is seen as a parallel with the struggles of a young bold film director, and a plea for a strong British film industry. The strong crusading tone of the film prefigures Powell's wartime propaganda films such as 49th Parallel and Contraband. A minor character is pointedly called 'Grierson' after the celebrated documentary maker John Grierson. This character is described as 'the best rivetter in the yard' who 'taught me [Barr] everything I know'. This scene is immediately followed with one of Barr firing a 'militant' worker intent on provoking industrial strife in the yard.

== Home media ==
The film has been released on Region 1 DVD by MPI along with The Phantom Light (1934) and The Upturned Glass (1947). It has also been released on Region 2 DVD by Opening in the "Les films de ma vie" series. The DVD has fixed French subtitles for the original English soundtrack.
