= Rynox =

1932 film

- Trade Show advertisement from The Daily Film Renter, 30 October 1931
- Directed by: Michael Powell
- Written by: Michael Powell; Jerome Jackson; Philip MacDonald
- Produced by: Jerome Jackson
- Starring: Stewart Rome; John Longden; Dorothy Boyd
- Cinematography: Geoffrey Faithfull
- Edited by: Arthur Seabourne
- Production company: Film Engineering
- Distributed by: Ideal Films
- Release date: 7 May 1932
- Running time: 48 minutes
- Country: United Kingdom
- Language: English

Rynox is a 1932 British crime film directed by Michael Powell and starring Stewart Rome, John Longden and Dorothy Boyd. It was written by Powell, Jerome Jackson and Philip MacDonald, adapted from the 1930 novel by MacDonald. It was made at Walton Studios outside London as a second feature.

== Preservation status ==
For many years Rynox was believed to be among the lost films of Powell's 1931–1936 quota quickie period. A print was rediscovered in 1990. The film has since been remastered by the BFI National Archive.

== Plot summary ==
Wealthy businessman F.X. Benedik, head of the Rynox company, claims to have been receiving threats from a mysterious stranger named Boswell Marsh. Benedik is subsequently found murdered and the hunt is on for the elusive Marsh.

Benedik's son Tony takes over the running of the business and tries to find some lead on Marsh, and why he should have borne a murderous grudge against Benedik Senior. But a would-be blackmailer reveals that Marsh never existed.

After discovering that he was terminally ill, his father had committed suicide, having staged the elaborate deception about the non-existent Marsh in an attempt to cover the fact that he intended to take his own life, which would have voided the life insurance payout that rescues Rynox.

== Cast ==
- Stewart Rome as Boswell Marsh/F.X. Benedik
- John Longden as Tony Benedik
- Dorothy Boyd as Peter
- Charles Paton as Samuel Rickforth
- Leslie Mitchell as Woolrich
- Edmund Willard as Capt. James
- Fletcher Lightfoot as Prout
- Sybil Grove as secretary

== Reception ==
Although shot on a tight budget (Powell's own recollections varied between £4,500 and £8,000) Rynox was well received by contemporary critics.

Film Weekly wrote: "This three-quarter-size British picture provides proof that 'second features' can be made into attractive entertainment. ... There are faults in Rynox such a certain jerkiness in the narration and the presence of a few 'loose ends,' but, apart from these, the film has all the attractions offered by an ingenious story, queer happenings, and effective acting. Stewart Rome is the best of a competent cast."

Kine Weekly wrote: "An unpretentious mystery play which has some claims to ingenuity in construction, is competently acted by a popular cast, and well presented. ... Stewart Rome plays the dual role of Benedik and Marsh extraordinarily well, and it is almost impossible to see through the plot. ... Michael Powell has treated the fantastic story with imagination, and uses his camera to advantage. The settings have the stamp of the modernity, and things are kept well on the move. Although one has a fair idea who the mysterious character is, one can never be sure, and this compels concentration and keeps the interest and entertainment alive."

The Daily Film Renter wrote: "Snappy direction of a very competent cast holds interest throughout. Excellent studio settings, clear photography, and good recording make it an all-round success. Strongly recommended second feature booking. A genuine little triumph in the art of telling an intriguing plot in the minimum of footage – a lesson we wish a few more directors would learn. ... The acting is perfectly co-ordinated and full of punch."

Picturegoer wrote: "This unpretentious mystery picture has some claim to originality in conception and affords Stewart Rome a chance of showing that he is an actor of ability. ... Rather complicated, but nevertheless quite clearly told. Moreover, it is not too easy to foresee the ending. Camera work is good and the action quite brisk."

Writing in The Observer, critic C. A. Lejeune remarked: "Powell's Rynox shows what a good movie brain can do... this is the sort of pressure under which a real talent is shot red-hot into the world."

Documentary film pioneer John Grierson declared the film "as good as Hollywood" and that "there never was an English film so well-made".

Sergio Angelini of the British Film Institute wrote: "Powell's direction already shows his characteristic energy and visual imagination, as well as his debt to the German Expressionist cinema of the 1920s. Rynox is full of quick cuts, tracking shots, unusual angles as well as montages, all of which help effectively to draw attention away from ... the film's small budget."

== See also ==
- List of rediscovered films
