= Cedric Belfrage =

English writer and activist (1904–1990)

Cedric H. Belfrage
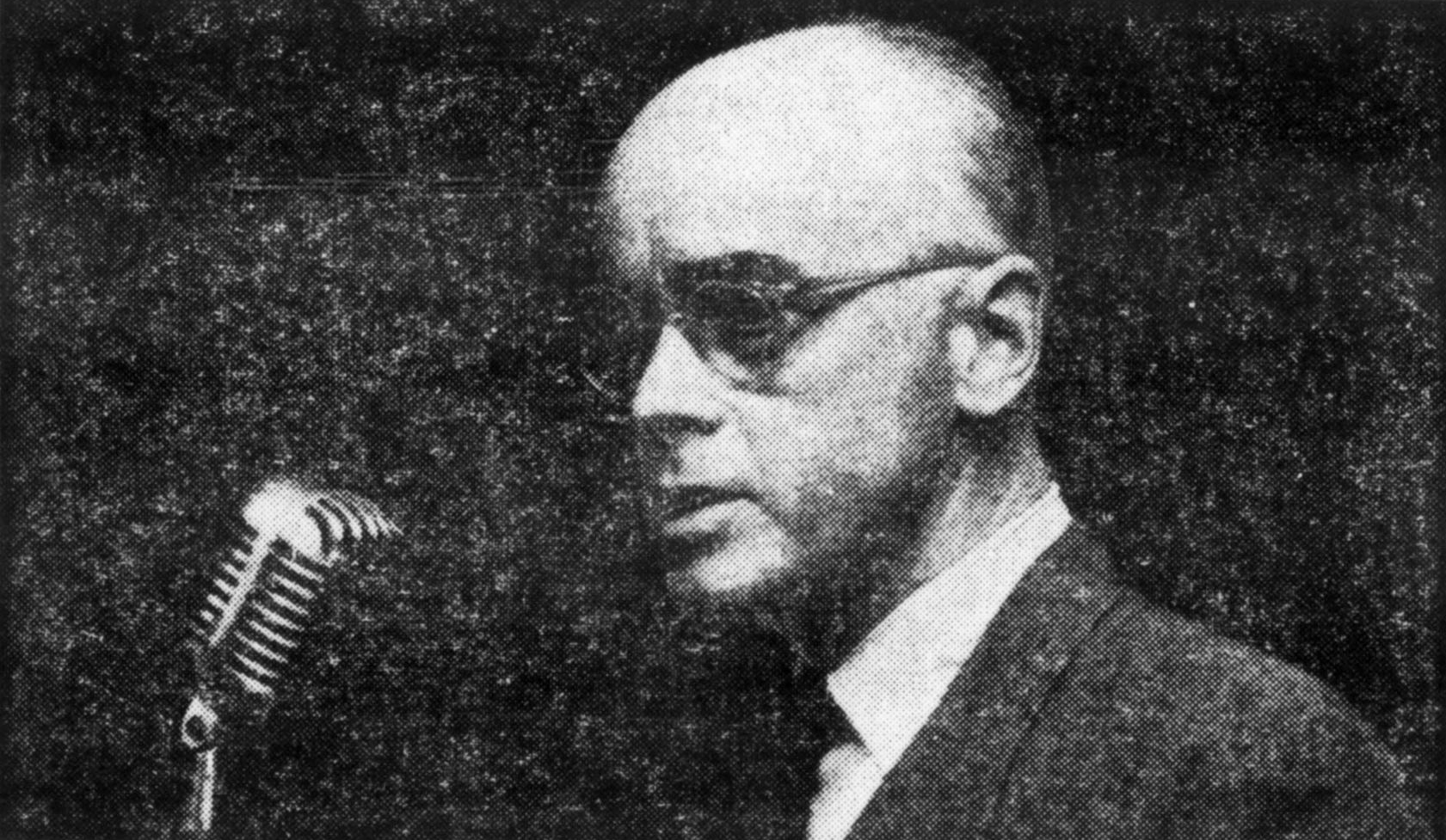
- Belfrage speaks at a rally against his deportation, 1954
- Born: Cedric Henning Belfrage; 8 November 1904; Marylebone, London
- Died: 21 June 1990 (aged 85); Cuernavaca, Mexico
- Education: Corpus Christi College, Cambridge
- Occupations: Film critic, journalist, writer, political activist
- Spouses: Virginia Bradford (m. 1928; div. 1930) Molly Castle (m. 1936; div. 1953) Mary Bernick (m. 1960)
- Partner: Anne-Marie Hertz
- Children: Sally Belfrage, Nicolas Belfrage; Anne Hertz (Zribi)
- Relatives: Sydney Henning Belfrage (father); Bruce Belfrage (brother); Bryan Powley (uncle)

Cedric Henning Belfrage (8 November 1904 – 21 June 1990) was an English film critic, journalist, writer and political activist. He is best remembered as a co-founder of the radical US weekly National Guardian. Later Belfrage was referenced as a Soviet agent in the US intelligence Venona project, although it appears he had been working for British Security Co-ordination as a double agent.

== Early years ==
Cedric Henning Belfrage was born in Marylebone, London, on 8 November 1904, the son of Frances Grace (née Powley) and Sydney Henning Belfrage, a physician and author. He was educated at Gresham's School, before entering Corpus Christi College, Cambridge. There he had the same room as Christopher Marlowe had in the 16th century.

While still a Cambridge student, Belfrage began a writing career as a film critic, with a first article in Kinematograph Weekly in 1924. In 1927, he went to Hollywood, where he was hired by the New York Sun and Film Weekly as a correspondent. Belfrage returned to London in 1930 as Sam Goldwyn's press agent. Returning again to Hollywood, he became politically active, joining the Hollywood Anti-Nazi League and co-editing the left-wing literary magazine The Clipper. He decided to make the United States his home and took out first papers for citizenship in 1937, although he failed to complete the process within the statutory seven-year time limit.

Belfrage joined the Communist Party USA in 1937 but withdrew his membership a few months later. Thereafter, he maintained a friendly but critical relationship as a so-called "fellow traveler" outside party membership and discipline, recalling in his 1978 memoir that for "temperamentally argumentative" adherents of socialism such as himself, such status as a "non-Communist, non-anti-Communist... suited us better." Despite his non-membership in the American Communist Party, Belfrage remained a believer that it functioned as "the core of the radical movement."

== World War II ==
During the World War II, Belfrage worked in the British Security Coordination for the Western hemisphere. After the fall of Nazi Germany, he was appointed as a "press control officer" in the Anglo-American Psychological Warfare Division and was dispatched to Germany to help reorganize that nation's newspapers. He and his associates requisitioned buildings, equipment, and supplies for a new "democratic" German press and oversaw a purge of Nazi collaborators from the new German newspaper industry.

It was while Belfrage was in Frankfurt working to establish the Frankfurter Rundschau – a new daily – that he met James Aronson, a veteran newspaper reporter and editor from Boston who shared Belfrage's radical politics. Aronson was attached to Belfrage and together the pair helped to establish new newspapers in Heidelberg, Kassel, Stuttgart, and Bremen, developing a friendship and forging vague plans to launch a new radical newspaper in the United States following the end of the war.

Belfrage was soon discharged from the Army and returned to the United States, however, and nothing immediately came of the pair's plans. Aronson returned to a job with the then-liberal New York Post in April 1946, moving later that year to a new job with The New York Times.

== National Guardian ==
The National Guardian was established by Belfrage, James Aronson, and John T. McManus in 1948 in conjunction with the Henry Wallace for President campaign.

In 1948, Belfrage co-founded, together with James Aronson and John T. McManus, a radical weekly newspaper called the National Guardian. He would remain affiliated with the publication – renamed The Guardian in 1967 – until late in the 1960s.

== Later years ==
In 1953, at the height of McCarthyism, Belfrage was summoned to appear before the House Un-American Activities Committee (HUAC). In 1955, he was deported back to England. His wife, Molly Castle, had already been deported by that time. He travelled to Cuba in 1961. In 1962, he travelled throughout South America, finally settling in Cuernavaca, Mexico.

Belfrage returned to the US for the first time in 1973, touring around the country with to promote his new book, The American Inquisition. He later debuted as a Spanish-English translator, notably for the Latin American author Eduardo Galeano. He was commissioned by Monthly Review Press to translate Galeano's Open Veins of Latin America. Belfrage continued to write extensively until his last years.

== Intelligence allegations ==
According to FBI files, Belfrage was questioned by the FBI in 1947 about his involvement with the Communist Party. The interview covered his relations with CPUSA General Secretary Earl Browder, Jacob Golos, V. J. Jerome, and surveillances and documents about Scotland Yard and the Vichy Government of France. In her 1951 memoir Out of Bondage, Elizabeth Bentley (who had reported to Golos) recounted Belfrage's interactions with Golos.

In 1995, intercepts decrypted by Venona – a project between the US and British intelligence services to decipher Soviet messages – were made public. United States intelligence has alleged that Unnamed Codename Number 9 (UNC/9) was Belfrage. Venona also had a cover name "Charlie" that was not identified by the FBI.

The 1948 Gorsky Memo, found in Soviet Archives, identifies Belfrage as having a covert relationship with Soviet intelligence as a member of the "Sound" and "Myrna" groups. Seven Venona decrypts reference UNC/9 in passing conversations between Belfrage's bureau chief and Winston Churchill on to the Soviets. During the period in question, the United States and the Soviet Union were wartime allies while at the same time the Soviet Union maintained a spy network of American citizens who passed US secrets to the Soviets.

== Personal life ==
He and his wife, Molly Castle, had two children; Sally and Nicolas. He also had a child, Anne Hertz (Zribi), with partner Anne-Marie Hertz. Cedric was the younger brother of actor and BBC newsreader Bruce Belfrage (1900–1974). Cedric's uncle was Bryan Powley, the actor who began his career in the era of Silent film.

== Death ==
Cedric Belfrage died on 21 June 1990 in Mexico, aged 85.

== Present-day allegations ==
In August 2015, Christopher Andrew, professor of modern history at Cambridge and official historian of MI5 accessed documents released from the UK National Archive which confirmed that Belfrage worked for the Secret Intelligence Service (MI6) during the war and also spied for the Soviet Union. The Financial Times described Belfrage as "a 'sixth man' to stand alongside the notorious Cambridge Five spy ring." Other UK print, TV and radio media carried the story.

On 17 September 2015 a BBC Radio Four documentary "The Hollywood Spy" examined Christopher Andrew's allegations, but also put forward information by historian John Simkin that Belfrage was working for British Security Co-ordination as a double-agent, which would explain why he handed information to the Soviets.

== Works ==
- Away From It All: An Escapologist's Notebook. Gollancz, London, 1937; Simon and Schuster, 1937; Literary Guild, 1937 Penguin (Britain)
- Promised Land: Notes For a History. Gollancz, London, 1937; Left Book Club, London, 1937; Republished by Garland, New York, Classics of Film Literature series, 1983
- Let My People Go. Gollancz, London, 1937
- South of God. Left Book Club, 1938
- A Faith to Free the People. Modern Age, New York, 1942; Dryden Press, New York, 1944; Book Find Club, 1944
- They All Hold Swords. Modern Age, New York, 1941
- Abide With Me. Sloane Associates, New York, 1948; Secker and Warburg, London, 1948
- Seeds of destruction; the truth about the U.S. occupation of Germany Cameron and Kahn, New York, 1954.
- The Frightened Giant. Secker and Warburg, London, 1956
- My Master Columbus. Secker and Warburg, 1961; Doubleday, New York, 1962; Editiones Contemporaneous, Mexico, (in Spanish)
- The Man at the Door With the Gun. Monthly Review, New York, 1963
- The American Inquisition. Indianapolis, IN: Bobbs-Merrill, 1973
- Something to Guard: The Stormy Life of the National Guardian, 1948-1967. With James Aronson. New York: Columbia University Press, 1978
