= Laurence Meynell =

English author (1899–1989)

Laurence Walter Meynell (9 August 1899 – 14 April 1989) was the English author of over 150 books, who wrote also as Valerie Baxter, Robert Eton, Geoffrey Ludlow and A. Stephen Tring.

== Life ==
Meynell was born in Wolverhampton, the youngest son of Herbert Meynell, chairman of a brass-founding firm, and his wife Agnes Mary Sollom. He was sent to the oldest Catholic boarding school in the country, St Edmund's College, Ware, and then served in the artillery in the First World War. He worked for a time as an estate agent and as a schoolmaster before becoming a professional writer in the 1920s. A contemporary satire, Mockbeggar (1924), won him the Harrap Fiction Prize.

Meynell wrote juvenile literature as Valerie Baxter and A. Stephen Tring. His story for boys, The Old Gang, was particularly well received. He also wrote detective fiction, with a recurring private-eye character, Hooky Hefferman.

Meynell was twice married, his second wife was the actress Joan Henley from 1956 until her death in 1986. He had one daughter, Ann Meynell b London 1938 by his first wife, Shirley Ruth Darbyshire (1903–1955). He died on 14 April 1989 in Hove, Sussex.
