= C.O.D. (1932 film) =

1932 British film by Michael Powell

- Garry Marsh in C.O.D.
- Directed by: Michael Powell
- Written by: Philip MacDonald; Ralph Smart
- Produced by: Jerome Jackson
- Starring: Garry Marsh; Hope Davey; Arthur Stratton
- Cinematography: Geoffrey Faithfull
- Distributed by: United Artists Corporation
- Release date: 22 August 1932
- Running time: 64 minutes
- Country: United Kingdom
- Language: English

C.O.D. is a 1932 British crime film directed by Michael Powell and starring Garry Marsh, Arthur Stratton and Sybil Grove. It was written by Philip MacDonald and Ralph Smart.

== Preservation status ==
The British Film Institute has classed C.O.D. as a lost film. Its National Archive holds a collection of stills but no film or video materials.

== Plot ==
A man helps a woman to dispose of the body of her stepfather.

== Cast ==
- Garry Marsh as Peter Craven
- Arthur Stratton as Mr Briggs
- Hope Davey as Frances
- Sybil Grove as Mrs Briggs
- Roland Culver as Edward
- Peter Gawthorne as detective
- Cecil Ramage as Vyner
- Bruce Belfrage as Philip

== Reception ==
Film Weekly wrote: "Far-fetched murder mystery melodrama, which is likely to cause more guffaws than gasps. The story is utterly ridiculous, the direction slipshod, and the acting indifferent. Definitely a 'quota picture' in the uncomplimentary sense. It is perhaps unfair to criticise the players, because they do what they can with extremely discouraging material, Garry Marsh, in particular, puts up a fairly creditable performance against heavy odds, and he is scarcely to be blamed if his acting seems to lack its usual finish. ... Some of the situations might have been effective enough if they had been handled in the manner of an eerie thriller, but the treatment slips into unconscious humour so often that laughs replace thrills."

Kine Weekly wrote: "A fantastic, far-fetched crime drama, which vacillates between the serious and the unconsciously comic, with such uncertainty that it can never be taken seriously. The cast do all that is possible in the circumstances, but the material and the treatment defeat them. ... Garry Marsh is a somewhat callous Peter, but he sets about his work with a cheery determination. Hope Davey is never equal to the emotional demands as Frances, and Roland Culver is a very obvious murderer. Treated seriously and with some imagination, the story could have been turned into an eerie, sensational thriller, but the development is clumsy and it frequently happens that a situation which should have gripped the emotions only succeeds in provoking a smile."

The Daily Film Renter wrote: "Although certain parts of the story happen rather 'according to plan,' the film is diverting in the main. Direction is not without certain dexterity, and photography is very good."
