= His Lordship (1932 film) =

1932 British film by Michael Powell

- Bert serenades his girl Lenina
- Directed by: Michael Powell
- Written by: Oliver Madox Hueffer (novel); Ralph Smart
- Produced by: Jerome Jackson
- Starring: Jerry Verno; Janet McGrew; Ben Welden; Polly Ward
- Cinematography: Geoffrey Faithfull
- Edited by: Arthur Seabourne
- Music by: Richard Addinsell with song by Leslie Holmes and Clay Keyes; Musical direction by Maurice Winnick
- Distributed by: United Artists
- Release date: 5 December 1932 (UK)
- Running time: 79 minutes
- Country: United Kingdom
- Language: English

His Lordship is a 1932 British quota quickie musical comedy film directed by Michael Powell and starring Jerry Verno, Ben Welden and Polly Ward. It was written by Ralph Smart based on the 1931 novel The Right Honourable by Oliver Madox Hueffer.

== Preservation status ==
In 1992 His Lordship was declared to be "Missing, Believed Lost" by the British Film Institute, but a copy was subsequently found. It was put onto safety film and shown at the BFI's National Film Theatre 2000, where, according to critic Derek Winnert, it proved popular as a camp classic.

== Plot ==
Cheerful Cockney plumber Bert Gibbs inherits a title from his socialist trade unionist father and becomes Lord Thornton Heath. However, then he meets up with movie star Ilya Myona and when his mother asks about her, Bert implies they are engaged. After some adventures with some dubious Russian types, Bert's girl Lenina eventually wins him back.

== Cast ==
- Jerry Verno as Bert Gibbs aka Albert Lord Thornheath
- Ben Welden as Washington Roosevelt Lincoln
- Polly Ward as Leninia
- Peter Gawthorne as Ferguson, the butler
- Muriel George as Mrs. Emma Gibbs
- Michael Hogan as Comrade Curzon
- V.C. Clinton-Baddeley as Comrade Howard

== Reception ==
Film Weekly wrote: "A lamentable British attempt to be René Clair-ish without the touch of René Clair. Although it shows signs of an attempt to do something novel and worth-while, it can only be set down as very poor enlertainment. ... The treatment is obvious and heavy-handed, and the 'book' of the play, lacking the backbone of wit, collapses into sheer fatuity. It is really a pity that the film fails to come off, for it is easily the most ambitious yet turned out by the enterprising Jackson-Powell menage. The cast, too, would be quite adequate if they had the advantages of proper characterisation and good dialogue behind them."

Kine Weekly wrote: "This effort, which starts off as musical comedy, drifts into burlesque, and then finishes up in a rich satirical vein, is neither flesh, fowl, or good red herring. It is very good in parts, but the good parts are outweighed by the bad, those which have no definite place in the entertainment. However, with all its lack of cohesion and definite purpose, there remains in the picture a popular streak of cockney humour, and this should make it a usable quota booking for popular areas."

The Daily Film Renter wrote: "Irresponsible mixture of broad humour, satire and musical comedy burlesque. Cutting would improve, but picture is only moderate entertainment for the masses."

Picturegoer wrote: "Joy Verno, that clever and versatile British comedian, is very badly served with material ia this queer mixture of musical comedy, burlesque and satire, which is too indefinite and poorly constructed to entertain to any extent. The story has possibilities which have not been exploited. Continuity is ragged, and there is little to recommend it to discriminating patrons."

Picture Show wrote: "Starting slowly ... the action speeds up in the latter half, and provides amusing entertainment, with its mixture of burlesque, satire, musical comedy and romance."
