= Hotel Splendide (1932 film) =

1932 film

- Jerry Verno and Vera Sherborne in the film
- Directed by: Michael Powell
- Written by: Philip MacDonald (story); Ralph Smart
- Produced by: Jerome Jackson
- Starring: Jerry Verno; Anthony Holles; Edgar Norfolk
- Cinematography: Geoffrey Faithfull; Arthur Grant
- Edited by: Arthur Seabourne
- Distributed by: Ideal
- Release date: 18 July 1932 (UK)
- Running time: 53 minutes
- Country: United Kingdom
- Language: English

Hotel Splendide is a 1932 British comedy drama film directed by Michael Powell and starring Jerry Verno, Anthony Holles and Edgar Norfolk. It was written by Philip MacDonald and Ralph Smart, and was made as a Quota quickie.

== Plot ==
Jerry Mason inherits the Hotel Splendide at Speymouth but is disappointed when he sees it is a quiet place with few permanent residents. Gentleman Charlie, a jewel thief arrives after a long spell in prison expecting to be able to dig up the pearls he had buried – only to find the hotel has been built on the site.

== Cast ==
- Jerry Verno as Jerry Mason
- Anthony Holles as 'Mrs.LeGrange'
- Edgar Norfolk as 'Gentleman Charlie'
- Philip Morant as Mr.Meek
- Sybil Grove as Mrs.Harkness
- Vera Sherborne as Joyce Dacre
- Paddy Browne as Miss Meek
- Michael Powell as bugging device engineer (uncredited)

== Production ==
Made for £4,000 for Gaumont-British, the film features one of the earliest cinematic uses of Gounod's "Funeral March of the Marionettes", better known as the theme music for Alfred Hitchcock Presents.

== Critical reception ==
The Daily Film Renter wrote: "A snappy comedy-drama ... Virtues of film are its refreshing new twist to a theme which has been done before, the commendable straight course of its plot, and the good show given by Verno. An enjoyable comedy which stands up all the time. Suitability, like its certificate, universal."

Picturegoer wrote: "Jerry Verno is an efficient and funny comedian ... What laughter there is is [sic] easily accounted for but the scenes that are supposed to be thrilling miss the mark."

Kine Weekly wrote, "Comedy and thrills are adequately blended in a somewhat far-fetched crook story. Acting is quite good, presentation fair. A light second feature, of which cheeriness is the keynote, is indicated".

The Bioscope wrote: "Here is one of those unostentatiously produced British pot-boilers, made with an eye on the cash-box, which may be expected to hold its own in the family house, chiefly as a second feature. Its light comedy and mystery atmosphere will get it past an unsophisticated audience."
