= The Phantom Light =

1935 film

- Opening titles
- Directed by: Michael Powell
- Written by: Ralph Smart (scenario); J. Jefferson Farjeon (dialogue); Austin Melford (dialogue)
- Based on: the play The Haunted Light by Evadne Price and Joan Roy Byford
- Produced by: Michael Balcon (uncredited); Jerome Jackson (associate producer)
- Starring: Binnie Hale; Gordon Harker; Ian Hunter
- Cinematography: Roy Kellino
- Edited by: Derek Twist
- Music by: Charles Williams
- Production company: Gainsborough Pictures
- Distributed by: Gaumont British Distributors
- Release date: 5 August 1935
- Running time: 76 minutes
- Country: United Kingdom
- Languages: English, Welsh

The Phantom Light is a 1935 British crime film directed by Michael Powell and starring Binnie Hale, Gordon Harker, Donald Calthrop, Milton Rosmer and Ian Hunter. It was written by Ralph Smart, J. Jefferson Farjeon and Austin Melford based on the 1937 play The Haunted Light by Evadne Price and Joan Roy Byford. The screenplay concerns criminals who try to scare a new chief lighthouse keeper on the Welsh coast, in an attempt to distract him from their scheme.

== Plot ==
Sam Higgins alights at the train station for the Welsh village of Tan-Y-Bwlch to take over the North Stack lighthouse, which is believed by the locals to be haunted. There, he meets Alice Bright. She asks him to take her along to the lighthouse, explaining that she belongs to a "psychic society" and wants to investigate the "legend of the phantom lighthouse". He turns her down.

Sam reports to Harbour Master David Owen, who informs him that Jack Davis, Sam's predecessor, "just disappeared", as did the chief lighthouse keeper before him. Owen confirms there was a major shipwreck a year ago, caused, so he believes, by the phantom light. Jim Pearce tries to bribe Sam to take him to the lighthouse; Sam guesses he is a reporter. Alice later overhears Jim ask about hiring a boat, so she tries her charms on him, but again fails.

When Owen, Dr. Carey and others take Sam by boat to the lighthouse, the doctor examines Tom Evans, a mentally disturbed member of the resident staff. Evans tries to strangle the doctor, who decides he cannot be moved in his present state, to Sam's discomfort. Just to be safe, Sam ties Tom up. Sam's remaining assistants are Claff Owen (David's brother and Tom's uncle) and Bob Peters.

Then Jim shows up on a boat that is conveniently out of petrol. To Jim's surprise, he has a stowaway: Alice. Sam starts questioning his unwanted guests. Alice now tells him she is "an actress hiding from the police" because two admirers fought over her with knives.

Strange things start occurring. First a fire breaks out near Tom's bed. Then, Sam overhears Jim plotting something with Alice and admitting he is not a reporter. He fears they may be communist saboteurs. Jim has Alice hang a radio aerial out the window of the bunk room, but Tom (whom Claff has untied) sees her do it and sneaks up behind her. He hears Jim returning, so he hastily retreats to his bunk. When Sam shows up, Jim tells him that he is a naval officer after wreckers out to sink the Mary Fern for the insurance, most of the shares being held by the locals. Then Alice informs him that she is a detective from Scotland Yard.

Jim starts to transmit a warning to the approaching ship, but Bob and Claff are rendered unconscious, the light is sabotaged, and a decoy light is turned on. After Jim sends Alice to fetch Sam, Tom knocks Jim out and disables his radio. When Alice and Sam return, Tom locks them all in. Jim, however, climbs down the side of the lighthouse and swims to the village to alert the coast guard. Claff wakes up and unlocks the door, allowing Sam to set about repairing the light. They overhear Dr. Carey talking to Tom and learn that the doctor is the mastermind. The Mary Fern is saved just in time. Then, trapped at the top of the lighthouse, the doctor decides to jump.

== Cast ==
- Binnie Hale as Alice Bright
- Gordon Harker as Sam Higgins
- Donald Calthrop as David Owen
- Milton Rosmer as Dr. Carey
- Ian Hunter as Jim Pearce
- Herbert Lomas as Claff Owen
- Reginald Tate as Tom Evans
- Barry O'Neill as Capt. Pearce
- Mickey Brantford as Bob Peters
- Alice O'Day as Mrs. Owen
- Fewlass Llewellyn as Griffith Owen
- Edgar K. Bruce as Sergt. Owen
- Louie Emery as stationmistress

== Production ==
The opening scenes were filmed at Tan y Bwlch station on the Festiniog Railway.

== Reception ==
The Monthly Film Bulletin wrote: "The atmosphere is well built up and sustained, and the tension is balanced by the comic relief. The photography is very good, giving some fine views of Welsh landscape and of the village where the drama takes place. The shots of the ship Mary Fern in the fog are well done and add their full quota to creating tense expectation. ... Gordon Harker and Binnie Hale are well supported by the rest of the cast, especially by Herbert Lomas as the melancholy Welsh assistant keeper."

Kine Weekly wrote: "Gordon Harker's performance, excellent in its unforced humour, contributes greatly to sound entertainment afforded by melodramatic thriller, staged in a lighthouse off the Welsh coast. Presentation, background and human characterisation combine successfully to prevent the story from seeming too far-fetched. Certainly a box-office attraction for the masses with a special appeal to the school boy. ... Michael Powell works up the mystery with leisure, but likewise with skill, providing with charming opening sequences of Welsh rural scenery and characters, a good contrast to the tougher and more melodramatic events at the lighthouse."

Writing for The Spectator, Graham Greene described the film as "an exciting, simple story" and compared its plot to that of Wilfrid Wilson Gibson's poem Flannan Isle. Specific praise was given to actors Harker (for a "sure-fire Cockney performance") and Calthrop (whom Greene favourably compared to Charles Laughton).

== Home media ==
The film has been released on Region 1 DVD by MPI along with Red Ensign (1934) and The Upturned Glass (1947).

The film has been released on Region 2 DVD by Opening in the "Les films de ma vie" series. The DVD has non-removable French subtitles for the original English soundtrack. A digitally restored version of the film has also been released by Network DVD in Region 2.
