= Smith (1939 film) =

- Directed by: Michael Powell
- Written by: Major R.M. Lloyd
- Produced by: Major R.M. Lloyd
- Starring: Ralph Richardson; Flora Robson
- Cinematography: Bernard Browne
- Release dates: 28 June 1939 (première); 15 October 2004 (first public screening)
- Running time: 10 minutes
- Country: United Kingdom
- Language: English
- Budget: 400£

Smith (1939) is a short film directed by Michael Powell to promote a charity that helped ex-servicemen who had fallen on hard times, starring Ralph Richardson and Flora Robson.

== Production background ==
Because the British authorities in 1939 wanted as many people as possible to enlist for World War II, it was not a good time to be talking about ex-servicemen having problems. Although the film had a première at the Houses of Parliament before an invited audience of MPs and charity workers, it was never shown to the public. A fiscal disagreement between the charity and the agent who was booking the film caused it to be pulled from distribution.

Smith wasn't just thought to be lost, most people didn't even know that it even existed. It wasn't included in any filmography of Michael Powell, and Powell only refers to it briefly and obscurely in his autobiography. The film was discovered in 2003 through the detective work of Mark Fuller of Bristol and a safety print was made by the BFI. This was shown at film festivals in Vienna and Bologna in 2004 but it didn't have its first public screening in the U.K. until 15 October 2004 when it was shown in Canterbury, 65 years after it was completed.

== Plot ==
John Smith (Ralph Richardson) fought for his country in World War I. But during the depression of the 1930s he found it hard to find work. Finally the bailiffs appear and take everything of value. His loyal wife, Mary Smith (Flora Robson), tells John about a charity for ex-servicemen.

John appeals to the charity, and they help him: They give him a loan to get him back on his feet and they train him in skills that are more useful than the ones he had before.

A large part of the short film is taken up with a long speech by Major Lloyd from the charity as the camera shows us around. There are examples of ex-servicemen doing wickerwork and other small handicrafts.

== The Charity ==
The film was made for and was about a charity called The Embankment Fellowship Centre. Part of the detective work to locate it was necessitated because in the intervening 60-plus years since the film was made, the Embankment Centre had merged with and been absorbed into other similar charities to form The Ex-Service Fellowship Centres. In 2007 the name was again changed to Veterans Aid, and Smith can currently be seen in its entirety on their website.

== See also ==
- List of rediscovered films

== Bibliography ==
- Powell, Michael. A Life in Movies: An Autobiography. London: Heinemann, 1986. ISBN 0-434-59945-X.
