= Bryan Powley =

British actor (1871–1962)

- 1939 Spotlight photo
- Born: Bryan Gilbert Powley; 16 September 1871; Reading, Berkshire, England
- Died: 18 December 1962 (aged 91); Worthing, Sussex, England
- Occupation: Actor
- Spouse: Evelyn Mary Foster
- Children: Esmay Margaret
- Relatives: Nephews: Bruce Belfrage and Cedric Belfrage

Bryan Gilbert Powley (16 September 1871 – 18 December 1962) was an English stage and film actor. He began his career in the silent film era.

== Life ==
Powley was born on 16 September 1871 in Reading, the son of Louisa Jane Tinker and Rev. Matthew Powley. His father was at that time Vicar of Whitley, Reading, and had formerly been Chaplain to the British Community in Málaga, and a Canon in Gibraltar.

On 7 September 1904, Powley married Evelyn Mary Foster at All Saints Church, Hampstead. Evelyn was the daughter of Joseph Foster, the eminent genealogist. On 19 May 1905, Powley and Foster had a daughter, Esmay Margaret Powley.

Powley was uncle to Bruce Belfrage and Cedric Belfrage. He died in Worthing, Sussex, on 18 December 1962.

== Selected filmography ==
- The Harbour Lights (1914)
- Fancy Dress (1919)
- The Nonentity (1921)
- The Old Curiosity Shop (1921)
- Open Country (1922)
- The Glorious Adventure (1922)
- Wee MacGregor's Sweetheart (1922)
- The Poisoned Diamond (1933)
- Cross Currents (1935)
- Moonlight Sonata (1937)
- Love from a Stranger (1937)
- Strange Boarders (1938)
- Old Mother Riley Joins Up (1940)
