= Two Crowded Hours =

1931 film

- John Longden (right) and Jerry Verno (centre)
- Directed by: Michael Powell
- Written by: Joseph Jefferson Farjeon
- Produced by: Jerome Jackson; Henry Cohen
- Starring: John Longden; Jane Welsh; Jerry Verno
- Cinematography: Geoffrey Faithfull
- Edited by: Arthur Seabourne
- Distributed by: Fox Film Company (UK); Twentieth Century-Fox (US)
- Release dates: 8 July 1931 (London); 28 December 1931 (UK)
- Running time: 43 minutes
- Country: United Kingdom
- Language: English

Two Crowded Hours is a 1931 British comedy drama film directed by Michael Powell and starring John Longden, Jane Welsh, and Jerry Verno. It was written by Joseph Jefferson Farjeon, and was made as a quota quickie. It is the first film where Powell is credited as the director.

== Preservation status ==
The British Film Institute has classed Two Crowded Hours as a lost film, included in its "75 Most Wanted" list. The BFI National Archive holds a collection of ephemera and stills but no film or video materials.

== Premise ==
A murderer is on the run from prison and is out to get everyone who put him there, especially Joyce, a young woman. Detective Fielding gives chase with the help of a London cabbie, Jim, who has aspirations of becoming a policeman himself.

== Cast ==
- John Longden as Harry Fielding
- Jane Welsh as Joyce Danton
- Jerry Verno as Jim
- Michael Hogan as Scammell
- Edward Barber as Tom Murray

== Production ==
Two Crowded Hours was produced by Jerry Jackson for the Film Engineering Company and distributed by the British arm of Fox Pictures. Shooting was completed in 12 days in April 1931 in and around London's Soho.

"It was played for laughs and thrills", Powell said, "and we were paid £1 per foot by Fox. (216) We got £4,000 on delivery so obviously we had to make it for £3,000".

== Reception ==
Kine Weekly wrote: "A very good little murder drama with strong comedy relief. ... Acting honours go to Michael Hogan, for an excellent rendering of the homicidal maniac and to Jerry Verno, for his study of the Cockney taxi-driver. The latter is really brilliant, and the laughs he scores make it difficult sometimes to follow the succeeding sentences. John Longden is good as Fielding, but Jane Welsh is rather unexpressive as Joyce. Michael Powell has directed the picture admirably. Not only has he got over the comedy lines with the fullest effort, but has got a real thrill out of the drama and a lot of well-developed action."

Variety wrote: "Just a quota quickie, but much better than many more ambitious pictures turned out this side. Film doesn't rate as anything great, but compares favorably with a lot of the stuff which is raved about here. Hoke plain and uncompromising, though the sort of hoke which is likely to entertain as a second feature in the two program weekly neighborhood spots. ... Quite well produced with the street chases good for this side. Key of the picture is held by Jimmy Verno, who, as the caustic taxi driver, walks off with the film. John Longden and Jane Welsh have the other leads. Latter is badly photographed. Production, all things considered, better than expected for the cost. This unit might make a real picture if given some coin."
