= The Night of the Party =

- U.S. trade ad
- Directed by: Michael Powell
- Written by: Roland Pertwee; John Hastings Turner
- Produced by: Jerome Jackson
- Starring: Leslie Banks; Ian Hunter; Jane Baxter; Ernest Thesiger
- Cinematography: Glen MacWilliams
- Music by: Louis Levy
- Production company: Gaumont British Picture Corporation
- Distributed by: Gaumont British
- Release date: 16 July 1934
- Running time: 61 minutes
- Country: United Kingdom
- Language: English

The Night of the Party (U.S. title: The Murder Party) is a 1934 British mystery thriller film directed by Michael Powell and starring Leslie Banks, Ian Hunter, Jane Baxter, Ernest Thesiger and Malcolm Keen. It was written by Roland Pertwee and John Hastings Turner.

== Plot ==
After inviting guests to a dinner party the ruthless press baron Lord Studholme is found murdered during a party game. The investigating detectives have to work out which of the guests had the motive to murder him.

== Cast ==
- Leslie Banks as Sir John Holland
- Ian Hunter as Guy Kennion
- Jane Baxter as Peggy Studholme
- Ernest Thesiger as Chiddiatt
- Viola Keats as Joan Holland
- Malcolm Keen as Lord Studholme
- Jane Millican as Anna Chiddiatt
- Muriel Aked as Princess Amelia
- Gerald Barry as Baron Cziatch
- Cecil Ramage as Howard Vernon
- John Turnbull as Insp. Ramage
- W. Graham Brown as General Piddinghoe
- Laurence Anderson as Defence counsel
- Louis Goodrich as The Judge
- Disney Roebuck as Butler
- Gordon Begg as Miles

== Production ==
It was made at the Lime Grove Studios in Shepherd's Bush. The art direction was by Alfred Junge, later a regular contributor to the films of Powell and Pressburger.

== Critical reception ==
Kinematograph Weekly wrote in 1934, "Direction and production lack that slickness and kick which is so essential to the complete success of this type of manufactured thriller. Few of the stage favourites comprising the cast succeed in adapting their technique to the requirements of the screen." the reviewer however singled out Viola Keats and Ernest Thesiger as the two "who really succeed in establishing definite character." The reviewer added, "the film is just lukewarm mystery entertainment, suitable for second rather than first place on the programme."

The Daily Film Renter wrote: "A thriller that moves well and, with sufficient allowance of humour and romance always interesting, aided by exceptional acting from Leslie Banks, Thesiger and other principals in cast of familiar players. Tense denouement in Old Bailey courtroom sets final seal on production ranking as powerful popular entertainment everywhere."

The Radio Times wrote, "The film's surviving interest is as one of the earliest extant works of Michael Powell, still in his twenties at the time. The project offered little artistic challenge, but he directs fluently enough and seems to have cut short the lengthy courtroom dénouement in favour of a lively, if implausible, interruption by the guilty party."
