= The Compulsory Wife =

1937 British film by Arthur B. Woods

- Trade advertisement for the film
- Directed by: Arthur B. Woods
- Written by: John Dighton; Reginald Purdell
- Produced by: Irving Asher
- Starring: Henry Kendall; Joyce Kirby
- Cinematography: Basil Emmott
- Distributed by: Warner Brothers-First National Productions
- Release date: March 1937
- Running time: 57 minutes
- Country: United Kingdom
- Language: English

The Compulsory Wife is a 1937 British quota quickie comedy film, directed by Arthur B. Woods and starring Henry Kendall and Joyce Kirby. It was written by John Dighton and Reginald Purdell.

== Preservation status ==
The British Film Institute has classed The Compulsory Wife as a lost film. Its National Archive holds a collection of ephemera but no film or video materials.

== Plot ==
Farcical complications arise when a pair of strangers have to spend a night alone together in a country cottage when their hosts are detained in town. Overnight all their luggage is stolen by a burglar, leaving them with nothing but their nightclothes. Then the next morning their hosts and the other guests start arriving.

== Cast ==
- Henry Kendall as Rupert Sinclair
- Joyce Kirby as Bobbie Carr
- George Merritt as Thackeray
- Margaret Yarde as Mrs. Thackeray
- Robert Hale as Craven
- Agnes Lauchlan as Mrs. Craven

== Reception ==
The Daily Film Renter wrote: "Introducing time-honoured trappings of near-farce, action has moments of amusing fun, punning dialogue, and usual misunderstandings, while Joyce Kirby gives piquant portrayal in lead. Acceptable light quota support."

Kine Weekly wrote: "It wouid be unfair to dwell too critically on this production, which has obviously been made for quota purposes and has no pretensions to compete as entertainment with pictures made with a definite box-office appeal. Even as a minor contribution from a British studio it is palpably weak in story value, while the semi-facetious dialogue is irritating. Its attraction can only be assessed as extremely limited."

Picturegoer wrote: "Henry Kendall struggles valiantly with a role which puts him in impossible situations, and he does not get a lot of help from the rest of the cast. ... Direction and production are very weak.

Picture Show wrote: "It is artificial and fairly amusing."
