= Quiet Please =

Quiet Please may refer to:

- Quiet, Please, an American fantasy and horror radio program
- Quiet Please (Big City Greens), an episode of Big City Greens
- Quiet Please!: Bawal ang Maingay, a Filipino television game show
- "Quiet Please", a 2002 episode of Rugrats
- Quiet Please... The New Best of Nick Lowe, an album by Nick Lowe
- "Quiet Please" (The Flumps), a children's television episode
- Quiet Please!, a 1945 Tom and Jerry cartoon
- Quiet, Please, a 2016 documentary about misophonia
- Quiet, Please (1938 film), a British comedy film
