= You Live and Learn =

1937 film by Arthur B. Woods

- Film poster
- Directed by: Arthur B. Woods
- Written by: Tom Phipps; Brock Williams
- Produced by: Irving Asher
- Starring: Glenda Farrell; Claude Hulbert
- Cinematography: Basil Emmott
- Production company: First National Pictures
- Distributed by: Warner Bros.
- Release date: September 1937
- Running time: 81 minutes
- Country: United Kingdom
- Language: English

You Live and Learn is a lost 1937 British comedy film directed by Arthur B. Woods and starring Glenda Farrell and Claude Hulbert. It was written by Tom Phipps and Brock Williams based on the novel Have You Come for Me? by Norma Patterson. The film was a quota quickie production released by Warner Bros. in September 1937.

== Preservation status ==
The British Film Institute has classed You Live and Learn as a lost film. Its National Archive holds a collection of stills but no film or video materials.

== Plot ==
American chorus-girl Mamie Wallace travels to Paris with a ramshackle touring musical revue. The company runs out of money, and it looks as though Mamie and her dancing colleagues are going to be stranded in Europe with no way home. Luckily, she meets a handsome, well-spoken Englishman Peter Millett, who falls in love with her and proposes marriage. Under the impression that he is a man of means, she readily accepts, imagining an entrée to English high society.

The couple return to England, and Mamie discovers to her horror that not only is her new home a decrepit farmhouse out in the sticks, but that Peter is a widower and his three children also come as part of the package. Despite her disappointment, she shows her pluck and spirit by determining not to run away but to stay and make the best of things. However the local villagers are shocked by her city ways and appearance and make it difficult for her to fit in. An additional difficulty reveals itself in the person of local schoolteacher Dot Harris, who has long had an eye on Peter for herself and is now consumed with jealousy and spite, going out of her way to cause trouble for Mamie at every opportunity. However Mamie's good nature and decency are gradually acknowledged, and she triumphs in the end.

== Cast ==
- Glenda Farrell as Mamie Wallace
- Claude Hulbert as Peter Millett
- Glen Alyn as Dot Harris
- John Carol as George
- James Stephenson as Sam Brooks
- Arthur Finn as Joseph P. Munro
- George Galleon as Lord Haverstock
- Wallace Evennett as Amos Biddle
- Margaret Yarde as Mrs. Biddle

== Reception ==
The Monthly Film Bulletin wrote: "The story is not without interest and the Anglo-American marriage provides situations which would have been more humorous if they had been made less obviously comic. But the distinctive types of humour represented by Claude Hulbert and Glenda Farrell do not blend well and it is difficult to accept them as a married couple: his Oh-I-Say style becomes vague and meaningless while Glenda Farrell's wisecracks by contrast with it become strident and acrid."

Kine Weekly wrote: "Rustic romantic comedy introducing an Anglo-American team with possibilities in Glenda Farrell and Claude Hulbert. The story is more ingenuous than piquant, but the humour has a homely native quality, and this is widely recognised by the stars and experienced supporting players. Built for the family as well as the crowd, the entertainment on offer should register favourably in the majority of halls."

The Daily Film Renter wrote: "Sound popular comedy of American ex-chorine's life as wife of goofy farmer in remote English village. Scandalmongering, culminating in effort by interfering school ma'am to send children to home, gives dramatic punch to otherwise slight narrative. Truthful village incident, delightful skit of parish social, and compelling climactic court scene. Good stellar portrayals. Worthy laugh proposition for general halls."

Variety wrote: "Simple but pleasing little comedy which is unpretentious and entertaining in its own limited sphere, and should make an acceptable second feature. ... Glenda Farrell gives a good performance as the disillusioned chorine, and Claude Hulbert registers as her nutty husband, though he is foo detached. Youngsters are charmingly played and the remainder of the cast more than satisfactory. Direction is smooth. Slight cutting should improve the tempo."
