= It's in the Blood =

- Claude Hulbert and Lesley Brook in a scene from the film (Picture Show, 13 August 1938)
- Directed by: Gene Gerrard
- Written by: John Dighton; Basil Dillon; J. O. C. Orton; Reginald Purdell; David Whitelaw; Brock Williams
- Produced by: Irving Asher
- Starring: Claude Hulbert; Lesley Brook; Max Leeds
- Cinematography: Basil Emmott
- Production company: Warner Brothers
- Distributed by: Warner Brothers
- Release date: March 1938
- Running time: 56 minutes
- Country: United Kingdom
- Language: English

It's in the Blood is a 1938 British comedy film directed by Gene Gerrard and starring Claude Hulbert, Lesley Brook and Max Leeds. It was written by John Dighton, Basil Dillon, J. O. C. Orton, Reginald Purdell, David Whitelaw and Brock Williams based on the 1936 novel The Big Picture by Whitelaw, and made at Teddington Studios by the British subsidiary of Warner Brothers.

== Preservation status ==
The British Film Institute National Archive holds a collection of ephemera and stills, but no film or video materials.

== Plot ==
Mild-mannered crime film addict Edwin Povey is anxious for adventure. On a day trip to Boulogne, he gets involved with a gang of jewel thieves, escapes back to England, and then sets about tracking down the gang.

== Cast ==
- Claude Hulbert as Edwin Povey
- Lesley Brook as Jill Borden
- Max Leeds as James Renton
- James Stephenson as Milky Joe
- Clem Lawrence as Dave Grimmett
- Glen Alyn as Celestin
- Percy Walsh as Jules Barres
- George Galleon as Gendarme

== Reception ==
The Monthly Film Bulletin wrote: "Unpretentious, lively film which will appeal to Hulbert fans."

Kine Weekly wrote: "Claude Hulbert virtually carries the picture in a made-to-measure role as Povey. It's the familiar Hulbert act, but it fits effectively into the story. Lesley Brook is less well served with material as the girl, but James Stephenson is excellent as Milky Joe, and the supporting parts are capably filled. Story and situations are artificial, and dialogue is not always bright, but these defects are compensated for in large measure by robust comedy and brisk action in hero's clashes with the crooks. The picture as a whole, in fact, is designed to exploit particular methods and characterisation of the star, and it succeeds admirably in that aim."

The Daily Film Renter wrote: "Tailored to talents of Claude Hulbert, who is amusing as amateur sleuth involved in hectic adventures, film has fair quota of entertainment, with action staged in British and French settings. ... Lesley Brook pleasantly supports the star, James Stephenson making a good menace, and Glen Alyn appearing as a conventional siren."

Picturegoer wrote: "Hearty broad farce, with typical material for Claude Hulbert as a hesitant young salesman who longs for adventure and who gets involved with an international gang of jewel thieves on a day trip to Boulogne. The weight of the film is borne by Claude Hulbert, who makes the most of the artificial situations and often dull dialogue."

Picture Show wrote: "Claude Hulbert in this comedy melodrama has a typical role ...It is a little slow-moving and rather unconvincing, competently acted."
