= The Vulture (1937 film) =

- Claude Hulbert and Lesley Brook in a scene from the film
- Directed by: Ralph Ince
- Written by: John Dighton; Reginald Purdell; Brock Williams
- Produced by: Irving Asher
- Starring: Claude Hulbert; Hal Walters; Lesley Brook
- Cinematography: Basil Emmott
- Distributed by: Warner Brothers-First National Productions
- Release date: 17 February 1937
- Running time: 67 minutes
- Country: United Kingdom
- Language: English

The Vulture is a 1937 British quota quickie comedy film directed by Ralph Ince and starring Claude Hulbert, Hal Walters and Lesley Brook. It was written by John Dighton, Reginald Purdell and Brock Williams. It was followed by a sequel, The Viper (1938).

== Preservation status ==
The British Film Institute has classed The Vulture as a lost film, included in its "75 Most Wanted" list of missing British feature films. Its National Archive holds a collection of stills but no film or video materials.

== Plot ==
Hopeless but eager would-be private detective Cedric Gull has just obtained a diploma from a backstreet "School of Detection" and is keen to put his new qualification to good use. Fortuitously, he happens to stumble across a crime scene at the office of a diamond merchant, who has just been robbed and assaulted and is being tended by his secretary Sylvia. The police arrive on the scene, but despite Cedric's proud boasts about his sleuthing qualifications, they decline his kind offers of help.

Striking out on his own, Cedric becomes convinced that the robbery was the work of a notorious gang of East End Chinese jewel thieves led by a mysterious and sinister individual known as The Vulture. He takes on board his ex-con sidekick Stiffy and the pair set off in pursuit of the criminals. Their plans come unstuck when their inept bungling lands them both in prison. However the police, aware of their interest in the case, agree to allow them out to act as decoys. Cedric learns that Sylvia has been abducted by the criminals. He decides to disguise himself as Chinese and try to infiltrate their hideout and rescue Sylvia. After a good deal of hapless buffoonery and narrow escapes from sticky situations, he and Stiffy finally succeed in freeing Sylvia, unmasking the thieves and uncovering the identity of the elusive Vulture.

== Cast ==
- Claude Hulbert as Cedric Gull
- Hal Walters as Stiffy Mason
- Lesley Brook as Sylvia
- George Merritt as Spicer
- Arthur Hardy as Li-Fu
- Frederick Burtwell as Jenkinson
- Archibald Batty as McBride
- George Carr as Charlie Yen

== Reception ==
The Monthly Film Bulletin wrote: "The film is adequately directed and the fun is well timed. Claude Hulbert makes the most of his opportunities and he is well supported."

Kine Weekly wrote: "Slapstick detective comedy, with a nitwit sleuth. Claude Hulbert fans should find this feature very much to their taste. The peculiar fecklessness of the star is well adapted to the super-inanity of the story, and the film, with its crazy humour and asinine 'hero,' goes all out for the well-known Hulbert effects – and gets them. The type of buffoonery here displayed may not be everybody's idea of amusement, but it can boast a definite public. ... Animation, rather than dialogue quality, is the strong suit of this picture. The last ounce of brainlessness is squeezed out of the comic detective and his burlesque adventures... Star appeal may help to carry a weak story."

The Daily Film Renter wrote: "Moves at brisk pace with ample knockabout and unsubtle dialogue, with characteristic portrayal from star and supporting cast of familiar players. Acceptable mass entertainment of type."

Picturegoer wrote: "An inane detective plot written to suit the 'silly ass' humour of Claude Hulbert who will score a number of laughs from his audiences. ... Lesley Brooks looks attractive but has little to do as the heroine."

Picture Show wrote: "Claude Hulbert gets in and out of all kinds of hilariously embarrassing situations as a correspondence-course detective who gets on the trail of some diamond thieves and masquerades as a Chinese, There is no attempt at conviction, but plenty of laughs and action."
