= James Stephenson (actor) =

British-American actor (1889–1941)

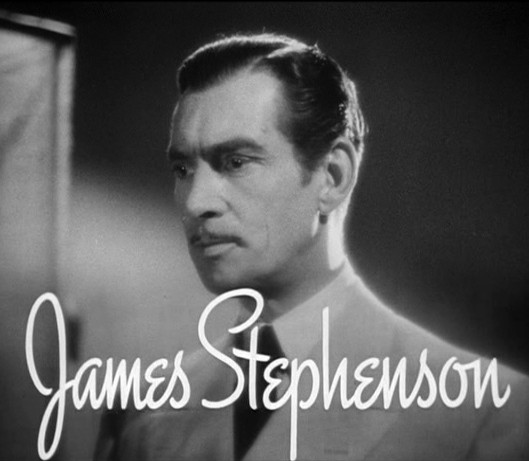
- Featured in trailer for The Letter (1940)
- Born: James Albert Stephenson; 14 April 1889; Selby, West Riding of Yorkshire, England
- Died: 29 July 1941 (aged 52); Pacific Palisades, California, US
- Occupation: Actor
- Years active: 1937–1941
- Spouse: Lorna Anderson Stephenson

James Albert Stephenson (14 April 1889 – 29 July 1941) was a British stage and film actor. He took up film acting at 49 and after a typically slow start delivered an Academy Award-nominated performance in the William Wyler-directed melodrama, The Letter in 1940. The roles offered to Stephenson dramatically improved following this performance, but he died just a year later at 52.

== Early life ==
Stephenson was the son of chemist and druggist John G. Stephenson and his wife Emma. He grew up in the West Riding of Yorkshire and Burnley, Lancashire, with his brothers, Alan and Norman. He became a bank clerk and later had a career as a merchant. In the 1930s, he emigrated to the United States and took U.S. nationality in 1938.

== Career ==
After acting on the stage, Stephenson made his film debut in 1937 at age 48, initially making films in Britain. Warner Bros. signed him the following year, and he began playing urbane villains and disgraced gentlemen. His big break came when director William Wyler cast him as a conscience-stricken lawyer, in spite of studio resistance, in The Letter (1940), opposite Bette Davis. He was nominated for an Academy Award for Best Supporting Actor for this role. Later that year, he played the title role in Calling Philo Vance. In 1941 he was first-billed in Shining Victory, in which he played the character of Dr. Paul Venner.

Just as Stephenson's acting career was starting to rise, he died of a heart attack at the age of 52. He is interred at Glendale's Forest Lawn Memorial Park.

== Partial filmography ==
- Perfect Crime (1937) - Parker
- The Man Who Made Diamonds (1937) - Ben
- You Live and Learn (1937) - Sam Brooks
- Take It from Me (1937) - Lewis
- The Dark Stairway (1938) - Inspector Clarke
- White Banners (1938) - Thomas Bradford
- Mr. Satan (1938) - Tim Garnett
- It's in the Blood (1938) - Milky Joe
- When Were You Born (1938) - Phillip 'Phil' Corey (Libra)
- Cowboy from Brooklyn (1938) - Prof. Landis
- Boy Meets Girl (1938) - Major Thompson
- Nancy Drew... Detective (1938) - Challon
- Heart of the North (1938) - Inspector Stephen Gore
- Devil's Island (1939) - Col. Armand Lucien
- King of the Underworld (1939) - Bill Stevens
- Torchy Blane in Chinatown (1939) - Mr. Mansfield
- Secret Service of the Air (1939) - Jim Cameron
- The Adventures of Jane Arden (1939) - Dr. George Vanders
- On Trial (1939) - Gerald Trask
- Wanted by Scotland Yard (1939) - Fingers
- Confessions of a Nazi Spy (1939) - British Military Intelligence Agent
- Sons of Liberty (1939, Short) - Colonel Tillman
- Beau Geste (1939) - Major Henri de Beaujolais
- The Old Maid (1939) - Jim Ralston
- Espionage Agent (1939) - Dr. Anton Rader
- The Private Lives of Elizabeth and Essex (1939) - Sir Thomas Egerton
- We Are Not Alone (1939) - Sir William Clintock
- Wolf of New York (1940) - Hiram Rogers
- Calling Philo Vance (1940) - Philo Vance
- Murder in the Air (1940) - Joe Garvey
- River's End (1940) - Insp. McDowell
- The Sea Hawk (1940) - Abbott
- A Dispatch from Reuters (1940) - Carew
- The Letter (1940) - Howard Joyce
- South of Suez (1940) - Inspector Thornton
- Flight from Destiny (1941) - Dr. Lawrence Stevens
- Shining Victory (1941) - Dr. Paul Venner
- International Squadron (1941) - Squadron Leader Charles Wyatt
- The Smiling Ghost (1941) - John Eggleston in Photo (uncredited) (final film role)
