= The Windmill (1937 film) =

1937 film by Arthur B. Woods

- Glen Alyn and Hugh Williams in the film
- Directed by: Arthur B. Woods
- Written by: Brock Williams; Tom Phipps
- Based on: novel by John Drabble
- Produced by: Irving Asher
- Starring: Hugh Williams; Glen Alyn; Henry Mollison
- Cinematography: Robert Lapresle
- Production company: Warner Bros
- Distributed by: First National
- Release date: 1937
- Country: United Kingdom

The Windmill is a lost 1937 British drama film directed by Arthur B. Woods and starring Hugh Williams, Glen Alyn and Henry Mollison. It was written by Brock Williams and Tom Phipps based on the novel by John Drabble.

== Preservation status ==
The British Film Institute has classed The Windmill as a lost film. Its National Archive holds a collection of stills but no film or video materials.

== Premise ==
During the First World War, the German adopted daughter of a Belgian innkeeper tries to balance her loyalty to her father, who is a spy for the Germans, and her love for a British soldier billetted in their inn.

== Cast ==
- Hugh Williams as Lt. Peter Ellington
- Glen Alyn as Clodine Asticot
- Henry Mollison as Gaston Lefarge
- Anthony Shaw as Colonel Richardson
- George Galleon as Major Arbuthnot
- William Dewhurst as Mons. Asticot
- Winifred Oughton as Mme. Asticot
- John Laurie as Mons. Coutard
- John Carol as Pvt. Goggie
- Bruce Lester as officer

== Reception ==
The Monthly Film Bulletin wrote: "The story is fairly watertight, though but half an eye is needed to see that Gaston is a spy. The sets are realistic and the atmosphere of the misty Belgian flat country particularly vivid. The direction is smooth, and the acting good. Glen Alyn, as Clodine, gives an insouciant performance which well fits her part. The photography is good."

Kine Weekly wrote: "A romantic espionage melodrama, with the Great War as its background, this picture is presented with more colour than conviction. The story is not too bad, nor is the acting; it is the somewhat clumsy direction and technical treatment that let the entertainment down. There are very few thrills and less suspense. However, the love interest reaches near popular proportions, and it is on this score that the film may pass muster with the not too critical."

The Daily Film Renter wrote: "Stereotyped development against unconvincing background, with attractive peasant girl innocently involved in espionage through villainous storekeeping fiancé. Air raid scenes, and climax with burning of spies' hide-out provide some thrills, but entertainment mainly for uncritical. ... The story pursues an unremarkable course, but the air raid in the middle of the picture serves to heighten the tension, which continues until the spies are finally unmasked. The portrayal is weak, and the players, whether representing English soldiers or Flemish peasantry, have an exclusively and oppressively Mayfair manner, while neither sets nor dialogue help matters much."

Picturegoer wrote: "Just another espionage drama with the Great War as its background, colourful but lacking in conviction and undistinguished in treatment. ... It is difficult to believe in the espionage detail and the film consequently lacks suspense. Williams is a likeable and virile hero, but why does Glen Alyn as the French-German heroine speak in the unmistakable accents of the West End theatre?"

Picture Show wrote: "This is an unconvincing spy melodrama set in the Great War. Hugh Williams gives quite a good performance and is competently supported."
