= Hello, Sweetheart =

1935 film

- Claude Hulbert and Nancy O'Neil in the film
- Directed by: Monty Banks
- Written by: Brock Williams
- Based on: The Butter and Egg Man by George S. Kaufman
- Produced by: Irving Asher
- Starring: Claude Hulbert; Gregory Ratoff; Jane Carr
- Cinematography: Basil Emmott
- Production company: Warner Brothers
- Distributed by: Warner Brothers
- Release date: June 1935
- Running time: 70 minutes
- Country: United Kingdom
- Language: English

Hello, Sweetheart is a lost 1935 British comedy film directed by Monty Banks and starring Claude Hulbert, Gregory Ratoff and Jane Carr. It was written by Brock Williams based on the play The Butter and Egg Man by George S. Kaufman. The film was made by the British subsidiary of Warner Brothers at the company's Teddington Studios.

== Preservation status ==
The British Film Institute has classed Hello, Sweetheart as a lost film. Its National Archive holds a collection of stills but no film or video materials.

== Plot ==
Dim poultry farmer Henry Pennyfeather is persuaded to buy a 49% stake in the financing of a film, but is swindled out of his money. He gets his cash back by staging the unfinished film as a burlesque show.

== Cast ==
- Claude Hulbert as Henry Pennyfeather
- Gregory Ratoff as Joseph Lewis
- Jane Carr as Babs Beverley
- Nancy O'Neil as Helen Taylor
- Olive Blakeney as Daisy Montrose
- Cyril Smith as Mac McGuire
- Morris Harvey as F.Q. Morse
- Felix Aylmer as Peabody
- Phyllis Stanley
- Johnny Nitt
- Marriott Edgar
- Carroll Gibbons as orchestra leader
- Ernest Sefton

== Reception ==
The Monthly Film Bulletin wrote: "A good type of farce. The stars have very suitable parts and the picture has considerable light entertainment value, although there is rather too much of the film within the film."

Kine Weekly wrote: "Satirical comedy, with a threadbare theme, far too dependent on dialogue to make a hit with the masses, and too obvious to brighten the lives of the highbrows. ... Although Claude Hulbert amuses at times as Henry, and Gregory Ratoff is very good as Lewis, both find themselves handicapped by the scrappy, artless story. ... This satirical comedy fails to register because it is not good screen material. The Americans have tried repeatedly to guy the film industry, make good-numoured fun of its foibles and ballyhoo, but even with their vast resources seldom have they been successful. To attempt the same thing here is asking for trouble, and Teddington is not Hollywood. As entertainment the film is disappointing."

The Daily Film Renter wrote: "Set mainly in studio, story yields many glimpses of actual production, although these scenes are intentionally mostly burlesque. Chief attractions are the well-contrasted performances of Hulbert and Ratoff, with humour mainly verbal. Most audiences will find sound entertainment in the acting and quick changes of plot and counterplot."

Picturegoer wrote: "`Claude Hulbert is occasionally amusing as the 'silly ass' and Gregory Ratoff good as the Producer, but both are starved of material. There is an overplus of dialogue."

Picture Show wrote: "Hilarious situations, bright dialogue and excellent acting make it one of the brighter British pictures."
