= Side Street Angel =

- Trade advertisement from The Daily Film Renter (11 March 1937)
- Directed by: Ralph Ince
- Starring: Hugh Williams; Lesley Brook; Henry Kendall
- Cinematography: Basil Emmott
- Production company: Warner Brothers First National
- Release date: March 1937
- Running time: 64 minutes
- Country: United Kingdom
- Language: English

Side Street Angel is a 1937 British crime comedy film directed by Ralph Ince and starring Hugh Williams, Lesley Brook and Henry Kendall.

== Preservation status ==
The British Film Institute has classed Side Street Angel as a lost film. Its National Archive holds a collection of stills but no film or video materials.

== Premise ==
Peter, a rich young man-about-town, poses as a poor man and is taken by ex-convict Soapy McGill to a hostel where he is given a job by the manager, Anne. Peter falls for Anne and stays at the hostel doing any job available. Soapy believes Peter is a safe-cracker, and after boasting about him to a gang, Peter is abducted by the gang to crack a safe. Anne rescues him, and discovers that he has bought the hostel so that its good work may continue.

== Cast ==
- Hugh Williams as Peter
- Lesley Brook as Anne
- Henry Kendall as Boscomb
- Reginald Purdell as Soapy McGill
- Phyllis Stanley as Laura
- Madeline Seymour as Mrs. Kane
- Edna Davies as Loretta

== Reception ==
The Monthly Film Bulletin wrote: "A somewhat disjointed comedy which scores by its acting rather than its plot. ... Henry Kendall as the superior valet and Reginald Purdell as Soapy liberally supply the comic element. Lesley Brook makes Anne seem really a welfare worker and Hugh Williams is a debonair Peter. A slight but entertaining film."

The Daily Film Renter wrote: "Production is quite good, and some of the dialogue guaranteed to chalk up laughs. The leading lady, Lesley Brook, makes a highly promising appearance, while Hugh Williams is an interesting man about town. Reginald Purdell's Cockney pickpocket is splendidly done, with a real sense of character, and Henry Kendall contributes a smooth comedy butler cameo."

Kine Weekly wrote: "Unpretentious romantic comedy drama of London life, presenting a spirited combination of clean sentiment, lusty rough stuff, and hearty slap-stick. The entertainment, augmented by sound acting and bright dialogue, is adequately equipped to play the role of supporting feature in popular halls. Good average quota hooking."

Picturegoer wrote: "Hugh Williams reveals a flair for comedy in this unpretentious mixture of romance and-rough stuff. ...The story is far-fetched and the treatment far from subtle, but the entertainment is helped out by bright dialogue and good acting, particularly from Henry Kendall, Lesley Brook and Reginald Purdell."

Picture Show wrote: "This is a quite brightly told story of a wealthy young man's adventures when he is taken to a hostel for 'penitent' crooks, and falls in love with the girl who runs it, ending to be a crook himself in order to stay there. The leading roles are excellently played, honours going to Henry Kendall for his delicious portrayal of the hero's butler, and there is plenty of humour."
