= Agnes Lauchlan =

British actress (1905–1993)

- Born: 10 February 1905; Putney, London, England
- Died: 28 August 1993 (aged 88); Surrey, England
- Occupation: Actress

Agnes Lauchlan (10 February 1905 – 28 August 1993) was a British stage, film and television actress.

Agnes Mary Lauchlan, was born on 10 February 1905 in Putney, London, to Henry D. Lauchlan, a surgeon, and his Scottish-born wife Minnie. She trained at RADA, and made her stage debut in 1924. Lauchlan married William Connelly in Surrey in 1948. She died in Surrey on 28 August 1993.

== Selected filmography ==
- The Compulsory Wife (1937)
- Oh, Mr Porter! (1937)
- Alf's Button Afloat (1938)
- The Spy in Black (1939)
- Me and My Pal (1939)
- The Young Mr. Pitt (1942)
- This Man Is Mine (1946)
- Once Upon a Dream (1949)
- Time Is My Enemy (1954)
