= Lexicon (card game) =

British word game using cards

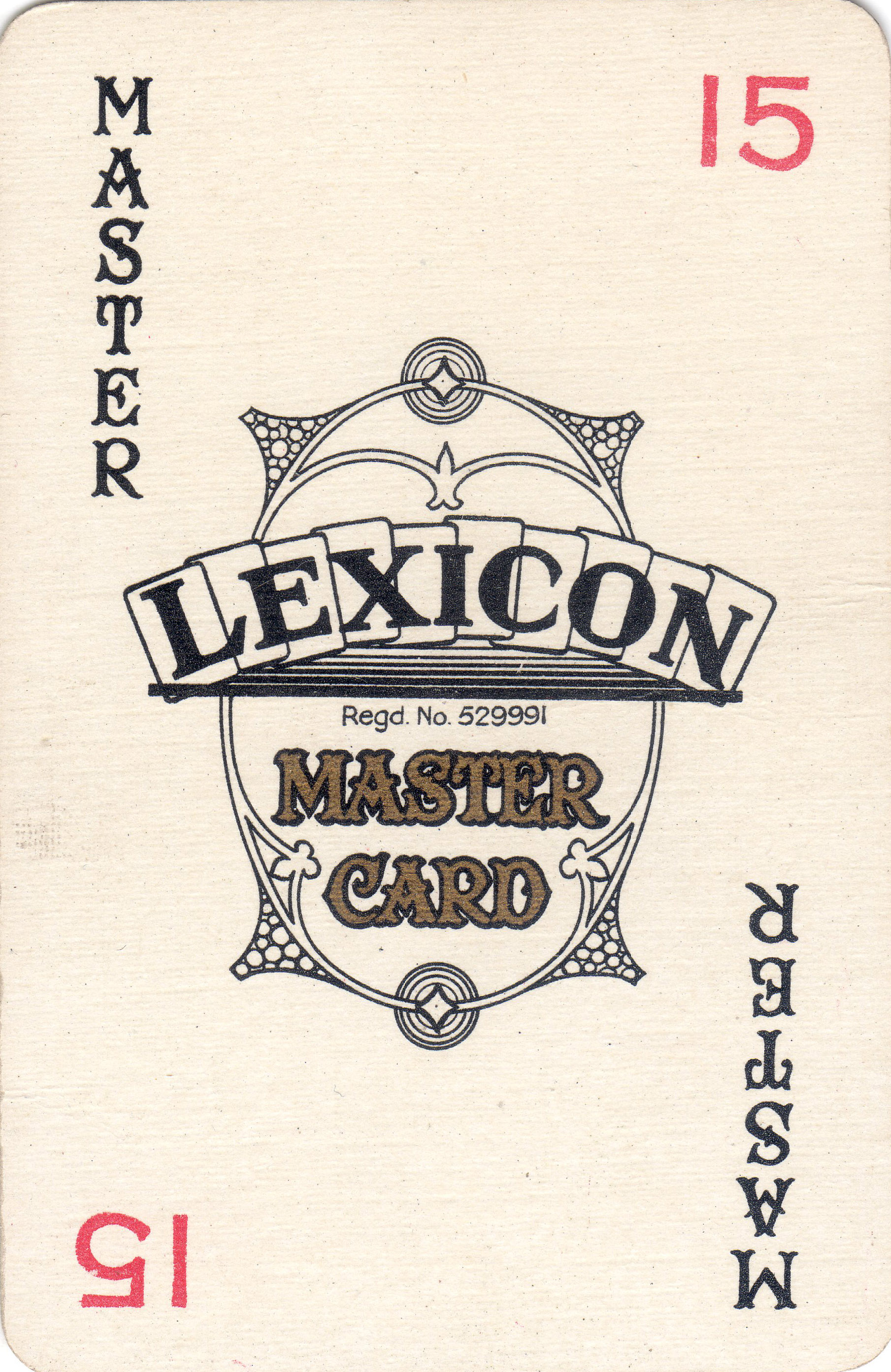
- Master card from 1933 edition
- Other names: Lex, Lexicon with Tiles, Lexikon, Crossword Lexicon, Script
- Designers: David Whitelaw
- Publishers: Waddingtons
- Publication: 1932; 94 years ago
- Genres: Word game
- Players: 2–4; more with an additional deck
- Setup time: 2 minutes
- Age range: 8+
- Skills: Vocabulary, spelling
- Media type: Playing cards or tiles

Lexicon is a word game using a dedicated deck of cards for 2 to 4 players published as a shedding card game.

The original game was published by Waddingtons in the United Kingdom, and it was later distributed and licensed internationally, and has been published with various names and in different formats. The intellectual property for the game is currently owned by Winning Moves.

Rules for numerous games using the deck of cards for Lexicon have been created, including for solitaire games and for tournaments.

== Publication history ==
Lexicon was created by David Whitelaw in 1932 and originally published by Waddingtons. After a poor launch for an initial small edition as a market test, Waddingtons upgraded the packaging and increased the price, and by late 1932 were selling thousands of units per day in stationery shops. A section in the rulebook was titled "How to arrange a Lexicon drive" for the organisation and execution of a party or tournament based on Lexicon.

By 1934, the game was being sold internationally. In March 1934, proceeds from a game in Australia were donated towards children's health care. In the United States, it was distributed by Parker Brothers as Crossword Lexicon. In 1938, George Parker stated that of all games sold by the company, the demand for Lexicon was only exceeded by that of regular playing cards. By the early 1970s, a version of the game had been released using tiles instead of cards, with minor rule variations.

Early rulebooks distributed with the game contained instructions for 23 games that could be played by 2 to 4 players with the deck cards. Certain copies came with a 1936 competition slip wherein £1,000 was offered in cash prizes. Several subsequent versions have been released.

From 23-25 September 1983, Waddingtons organised the Lexicon Golden Jubilee Weekend to celebrate the 50th anniversary of the game. It was hosted at the Victoria Hotel in Nottingham with various Lexicon-themed games, including "team Lexicon, Lexicon criss-cross, Lexicon clock patience, and individual games", as well as a dinner with alphabet soup, a lecture by the author of A History of Waddingtons, and a prize presentation event.

Waddingtons was purchased by Hasbro in 1994, which later sold Lexicon to Winning Moves.

== Gameplay ==
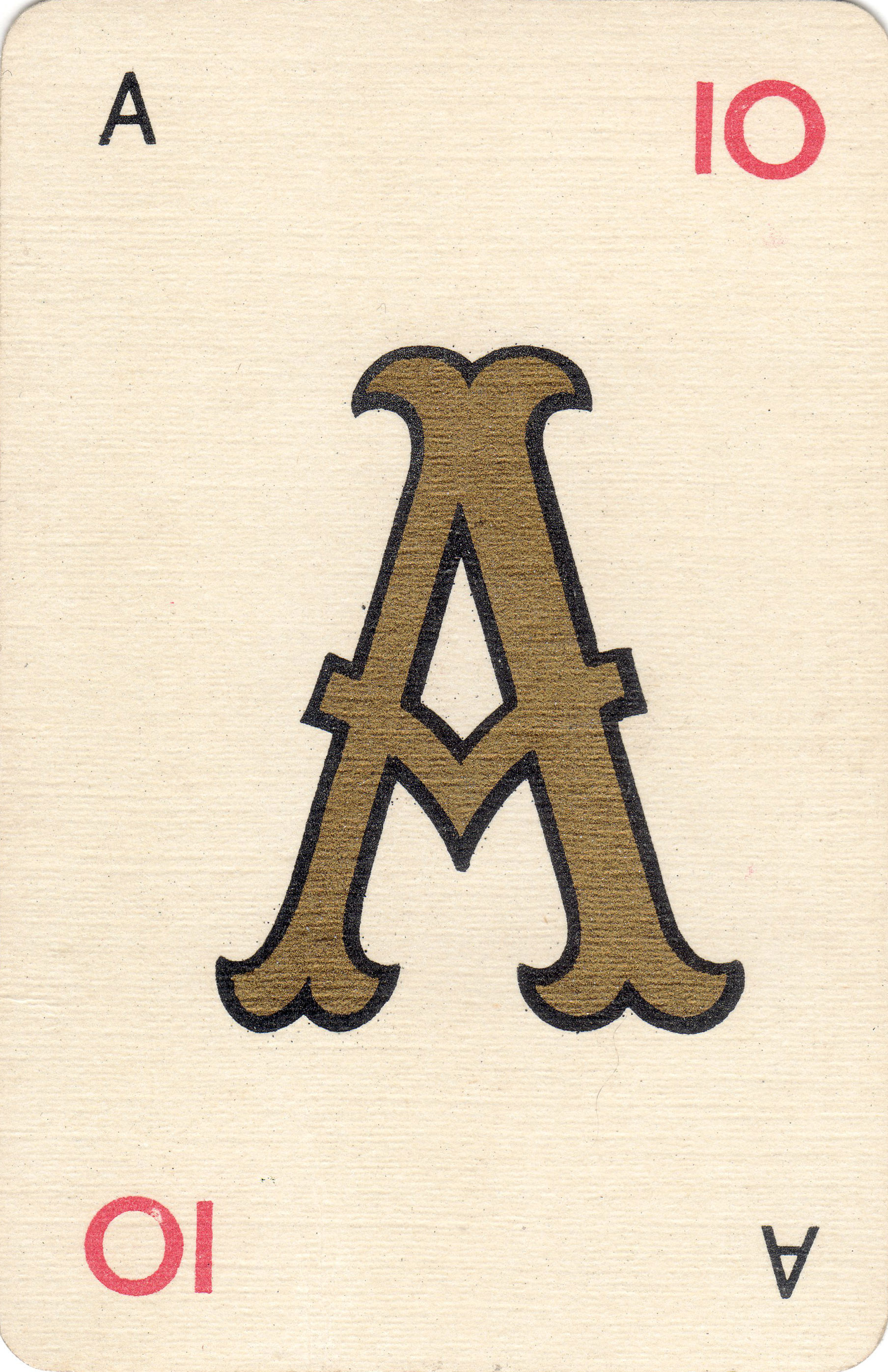
A Lexicon "A" card, worth 10 points

Each player is dealt ten cards from a pool of 52, each depicting a letter and a point value. Two packs of cards are used for more than 5 players. The letter distribution was originally four each of the vowels 'A', 'E', and 'I', three each of the vowels 'O' and 'U' and the consonants 'H', 'L', 'R', 'S', 'T', and 'W', and one each of the other letters and the Master card. The point values are 10 for 'A', 'E', and 'I'; 8 points for 'C', 'H', 'K', 'L', 'M', 'N', 'O', 'P', 'R', 'S', 'T', 'U', and 'W'; 6 points for 'D', 'J', and 'V'; 4 points for 'G', 'Q', and 'Y'; and 2 points for 'B', 'F', 'X', and 'Z'. The Master card is a wild card that may represent any letter, and has a point value of 15.

On their turn, a player may lay down a complete word with their letters, extend a word already played, or discard one of their cards and draw one from the top of the draw or discard piles. The player may also choose to exchange one or more cards with those forming a word in play, so long as the exchange results in a complete word.

The object is for a player to eliminate all cards from their hand. When a player has no cards left in their hand, the round ends and the other players each tally the point value of the cards they hold. A player may challenge a word as being non-existent or mis-spelt. A successful challenge reduces the challenger's accumulated points by 10, and an unsuccessful one increases it by 10. When a player has accumulated 100 penalty points over any number of rounds, they are eliminated from the game, and the last player remaining is the winner.

=== Other games ===
The Lexicon deck of cards can be used to play numerous games. Among them are Clock Patience, Lexicon Bridge, Lexicon Cribbage, Lexicon Criss-Cross, Lexicon Dominoes, Lexicon Eights, Lexicon Riddance, Lexicon Scrabble, various solitaire games, and team games.

In Lexicon Criss-Cross, the players form words within a 5×5 grid using 25 cards revealed in succession from the deck. Points are awarded based on the length of words formed, with 10 points for 5-letter words, 7 points for 4-letter words, 3 points for 3-letter words, and 1 point for 2-letter words.

In Lexicon Scrabble, a shuffled deck is scattered face-up on the playing surface and the players collect cards as quickly as possible to spell out a seven-letter word. The first player to announce their word wins the round. Players retain cards that were picked up for subsequent rounds, but any player who collected more than seven cards is disqualified.

== Reception ==
An entry in a 1934 article in The Sydney Mail stated that the cards "are packed in amusing little boxes looking like pocket dictionaries". In 1938, the game was promoted by Jane Froman on her radio programme Radio Row.

In a 1973 review, Richard Sharp described it as a "durable game" owing to its simplicity, as players can learn its rules quickly and games are generally short.

In its catalogue description, the Victoria and Albert Museum state that Lexicon is "the best known of the more sophisticated spelling card games" published during the 1920s and 1930s.
