= Claude Hulbert =

English actor (1900–1964)

- Born: Claude Noel Hulbert; 25 December 1900; Fulham, London, England
- Died: 23 January 1964 (aged 63); Sydney, Australia
- Occupations: Actor and comic
- Years active: 1920–1961
- Spouse: Enid Trevor (actress)
- Family: Jack Hulbert (brother)

Claude Noel Hulbert (25 December 1900 – 23 January 1964) was a mid-20th century English stage, radio and cinema comic actor.

== Early life ==
Claude Hulbert was born in Fulham in West London on Christmas Day 1900. He was the younger brother of Jack Hulbert. Like his brother he received his formal education at Westminster School and Gonville and Caius College, Cambridge, where he was a member of the Footlights Comedy Club as an undergraduate.

== Career ==
He began his professional career on the English stage. His first theatrical credit was in the revue His Little Trip in the Strand Theatre in 1920. The next year he appeared in the London revue Fantasia. In 1924, he was quite successful in the George Grossmith-Guy Bolton musical comedy Primrose, which led to a string of musical comedy roles for him from 1925 to the 1930s, including Sunny, Oh Kay, Song of the Sea and Follow a Star. Hulbert also was a hit on radio, thanks to his spontaneous manner of delivery, along with his nervous excitability and a stutter. In 1939, he returned to the London stage in the farce, Worth a Million. Subsequently, he was seen in Cole Porter's Panama Hattie (1943). In the 1950s, he appeared in numerous farces and in repertory theatre. In 1959, he made quite a splash as Lord Plynne in Frederick Lonsdale's Let Them Eat Cake

Although popular, his motion picture career was less successful than his brother's. He began by supporting the Aldwych farceurs before being handed his first lead in a weak B-film with Renee Houston and Binnie Barnes, Their Night Out (1933). His most successful solo film of the mid-1930s was Hello Sweetheart (1935); like most of Hulbert's starring comedies, however, its ambition was strictly small-scale; it seemed that British studios simply didn't see him as a major star. His flagging career was helped with Wolf's Clothing (1936), which starred him as a dithering diplomat, and Honeymoon-Merry-Go-Round (1940), where he played a bumbling bridegroom who unintentionally becomes an ice-hockey star.

He became a very capable partner for Will Hay after the Hay left Gainsborough pictures and moved to Ealing Studios thus parting company with his two "stooges", Moore Marriott and Graham Moffatt. Hay's two films with Hulbert, The Ghost of St Michael's (1941) and My Learned Friend (1943), were the most successful of his later vehicles. Hulbert's film appearances, though, became scarcer as the 1940s wore on.

In 1951 Hulbert starred in audio recording of the play The Ghost Train, which was commercially released by Decca Records (Release Catalogue No.LK4040). In 1952 he starred in the West End in the title role in Lord Arthur Savile's Crime, directed by his brother Jack.

== Personal life ==
He was married to the actress Enid Trevor.

== Death ==
Hulbert died on 23 January 1964 aged 63 in a hospital at Sydney, Australia, after having been taken ill whilst ashore during a round-the-world health cruise with his family.

== Filmography ==
- Champagne (1928)
- Naughty Husbands (1930)
- A Night Like This (1932)
- The Mayor's Nest (1932)
- Thark (1932)
- The Face at the Window (1932)
- Let Me Explain, Dear (1932)
- Heads We Go (1933)
- The Song You Gave Me (1933)
- Their Night Out (1933)
- Radio Parade (1933)
- The Girl in Possession (1934)
- A Cup of Kindness (1934)
- Lilies of the Field (1934)
- Big Business (1934)
- Love at Second Sight (1934)
- Hello, Sweetheart (1935)
- Man of the Moment (1935)
- Bulldog Jack (1935)
- Wolf's Clothing (1936)
- Hail and Farewell (1936)
- Where's Sally? (1936)
- The Interrupted Honeymoon (1936)
- The Vulture (1937)
- It's Not Cricket (1937)
- You Live and Learn (1937)
- Ship's Concert (1937)
- Take a Chance (1937)
- Simply Terrific (1938)
- His Lordship Regrets (1938)
- The Viper (1938)
- It's in the Blood (1938)
- Many Tanks Mr. Atkins (1938)
- Olympic Honeymoon (1940)
- Sailors Three (1940)
- The Ghost of St. Michael's (1941)
- My Learned Friend (1943)
- The Dummy Talks (1943)
- London Town (1946)
- The Ghosts of Berkeley Square (1947)
- Under the Frozen Falls (1948)
- Cardboard Cavalier (1949)
- Alice in Wonderland (1949)
- Fun at St. Fanny's (1956)
- Not a Hope in Hell (1960)
