= Olympic Honeymoon =

- Directed by: Alf Goulding
- Written by: Monty Banks; Joan Morgan; Alf Goulding (Screen scenario); Warren Chetham Strode (Dialogue)
- Based on: novel He and Ski by F. Dawson Gratrix
- Produced by: Sidney Morgan
- Starring: Claude Hulbert; Monty Banks; Princess Pearl
- Cinematography: Ernest Palmer
- Edited by: Vladimir Sagovsky
- Music by: Van Phillips (musical director)
- Production companies: London Screen Plays Productions; Fanfare Pictures
- Distributed by: RKO Radio Pictures (UK)
- Release date: 22 June 1940 (UK)
- Running time: 63 minutes
- Country: United Kingdom
- Language: English

Olympic Honeymoon (also known as Honeymoon Merry-Go-Round) is a 1940 British comedy film directed by Alfred J. Goulding and starring Claude Hulbert, Monty Banks and Princess Pearl. It was written by Monty Banks, Joan Morgan, Goulding and Warren Chetham Strode based on the novel He and Ski by F. Dawson Gratrix , and was made as a quota quickie.

== Plot ==
A British honeymooner visiting Switzerland is mistaken for a leading ice hockey player and is enlisted to play for the England national team.

== Cast ==
- Claude Hulbert as Bob Bennett
- Monty Banks as Orban
- Princess Pearl as Bunny
- Sally Gray as Miss America
- Tully Comber as Cosmo
- The Wembley Lions ice hockey team as themselves

== Reception ==
Kine Weekly wrote: "Euberant, if casual, marital comedy extravaganza with exciting ice hockey intermissions. ... Production work generally is satisfactory. Reliable comedy booking, particularly for the family and industrial element. ... Claude Hulbert puts over effectively his vacuous humour as the asinine Bob, Monty Banks is a good stooge as Monsieur. Orban, and Princess Pearl and Sally Gray register in contrast as Bunny and Miss America. The Wembley Lions ice hockey team furnish the athletic thrills."

The Daily Film Renter wrote: "Claude Hulbert's characteristic inanities makes no great demands on receptivity but make a good mainspring for a story which aims to get laughs from any and every means which come to hand. This results in a certain falseness, so that gags, amusing in themselves, fail to hang together or build into a coherent whole."

== See also ==
- List of films about ice hockey
