= Someday (1935 film) =

- Margaret Lockwood, Esmond Knight and Henry Mollison in the film
- Directed by: Michael Powell
- Written by: Brock Williams
- Produced by: Irving Asher
- Starring: Esmond Knight; Margaret Lockwood
- Cinematography: Monty Berman; Basil Emmott
- Edited by: Bert Bates
- Distributed by: Warner Brothers-First National Productions
- Release date: 18 November 1935
- Running time: 68 minutes
- Country: United Kingdom
- Language: English

Someday (also known as Some Day and Young Nowheres) is a lost 1935 British romance film, directed by Michael Powell and starring Esmond Knight and Margaret Lockwood. The screenplay written by Brock Williams, adapted from a novel by I. A. R. Wylie.

== Preservation status ==
The British Film Institute has classed Someday as a lost film. Its National Archive holds a collection of stills but no film or video materials. It is one of eleven quota quickies directed by Powell between 1931 and 1936 of which no print is known to survive.

== Plot ==
Curley is a lift operator in a block of exclusive London apartments. Emily is a cleaning-girl with a client, Canley, in the block, and she and Curley are attracted to one another and long to be married, but their poor economic prospects stand in the way.

Emily has to spend some days in hospital, and Curley wants to treat her when she returns. He decides to prepare her a special dinner, using an apartment belonging to a tenant who is away on business and has entrusted Curley with a key to keep an eye on the property in his absence. Unfortunately, in the middle of the romantic meal, the apartment owner returns unexpectedly and is furious to discover the unauthorised use of his apartment. The situation degenerates into a physical fight, and the apartment owner subsequently files a charge of illegal entry against Curley. Things look bleak until the amiable Canley learns what has happened and steps in to set matters right.

== Cast ==
- Esmond Knight as Curley
- Margaret Lockwood as Emily
- Henry Mollison as Canley
- Raymond Lovell as Carr
- Ivor Barnard as Hope
- Sunday Wilshin as Betty

== Reception ==
Kine Weekly wrote: "Slow, meandering romantic drama, a dilatory tale of life below stairs, reduced to entertainment of negligible quality by excessive footage. The theme deals with domestics and its suitability is confined mainly to picturegoers of that class. ... Esmond Knight is weak as Curly, and Margaret Lockwood is not much better as Emily. The one bright feature of the picture is Henry Mollison's human and amusing performance as Canley, Emily's dissipated but goodhearted employer."

Film Weekly wrote: "Slow and sloppy servant-girl romance that just goes on and on. Feeble entertainment."

The Monthly Film Bulletin wrote: "This is a pleasant unpretentious story pleasantly told. The direction, however, lacks polish and is not convincing. It is full of good ideas insufficiently carried out. ... While the photography is uninteresting, it is exceptionally clear and well done. Esmond Knight does not appear to be too happy as Curley but Margaret Lockwood is quite successful as Emily."

The Daily Film Renter wrote: "The picture's main appeal is vested in its simple charm, which family patrons should find extremely refreshing. Nothing very much happens, while the development is occasionally slow, but the interest is held throughout."

Picture Show wrote: "An appealing story of two young lovers prevented by poverty from getting married. ... Unpretentious but pleasing."
