= Isn't Life Wonderful! =

1953 film by Harold French

- Theatrical release poster
- Directed by: Harold French
- Screenplay by: Brock Williams
- Based on: Uncle Willie and the Bicycle Shop by Brock Williams
- Produced by: Warwick Ward
- Starring: Cecil Parker; Eileen Herlie; Donald Wolfit; Peter Asher
- Cinematography: Erwin Hillier
- Edited by: Edward B. Jarvis
- Music by: Philip Green
- Production company: Associated British Picture Corporation
- Distributed by: Associated British-Pathé]
- Release date: 16 November 1953
- Running time: 81 minutes
- Country: United Kingdom
- Language: English
- Box office: £97,710

Isn't Life Wonderful! (U.S. title: Uncle Willie's Bicycle Shop) is a 1953 British technicolor period comedy film directed by Harold French and starring Cecil Parker, Eileen Herlie and Donald Wolfit. It was written by Brock Williams based on his 1948 novel Uncle Willie's Bicycle Shop. The film was shot at the Elstree Studios of Associated British with sets designed by the art director Terence Verity.

== Plot ==
In Edwardian England, alcoholic Uncle Willie is an embarrassment to his family. The head of the household decides to set Willie up as the manager of a bicycle shop, hoping to impress visiting American heiress Virginia van Stuyden. The surprise for everyone comes when Uncle Willie's little shop begins to prosper.

== Cast ==
- Cecil Parker as Father
- Eileen Herlie as Mother
- Donald Wolfit as Uncle Willie
- Peter Asher as Charles
- Eleanor Summerfield as Aunt Kate
- Dianne Foster as Virginia van Stuyden
- Robert Urquhart as Frank
- Russell Waters as Green
- Cecil Trouncer as Dr. Barsmith
- Philip Stainton as Dr. Mason
- Edwin Styles as Bamboula
- Arthur Young as Sir George Probus
- Fabia Drake as Lady Probus
- Alec Finter as Uncle Richard
- Cicely Paget-Bowman as Aunt Theo
- Basil Cunard as Uncle Henry
- Viola Lyel as Aunt Jane
- John Welsh as Uncle James
- Margot Lister as Aunt Betsy
- Henry Hewitt as Cousin Arthur
- George Woodbridge as Cockie
- Wensley Pithey as Sam

== Critical reception ==
The Monthly Film Bulletin wrote: "The screenplay for this film was written by the author of the novel on which it is based, and his flow of sardonic dialogue appears to have intimidated the camera to the point of paralysis. The Edwardian costumes in Technicolor are charming, but otherwise it is far more rewarding to listen to than to watch. Cecil Parker, Eileen Herlie and the other members of the family give competent and pleasant performances, but it is Donald Wolfit, as the frowned-upon reprobate uncle whose reeling head does not affect his gentleness of heart, who succeeds in using the words to help him mould a solid character. The one and only song – 'Isn't Life Wonderful!' carolled on the way to a picnic on bicycles – adds to the leisurely somnolence of this good-natured entertainment."

Variety wrote: "Although not in the top ranking class of Genevieve or Titfield Thunderbolt, this comedy has some of the sterling ingredients of both. It has charm and an infectious gaiety with consistently amusing dialog. ... Cecil Parker and Eileen Herlie are ideally cast as the head of the family and his tactful spouse. Peter Asher is impish and appealing as their six-year-old son, Donald Wolfit brings a Dickensian virility to the part of the old soak while Eleanor Summerfield is charmingly lachrymose as his sorely tried wife."

TV Guide called it "A pleasant little charmer".

Sky Cinema wrote, "Director Harold French skilfully milks its situations for all they are worth...No big stars in this film, which makes it an unexpected treat. Based on an equally entertaining novel Uncle Willie and the Bicycle Shop. Donald Wolfit stars as the alcoholic Uncle Willie, Cecil Parker suffers splendidly as Father."
