= Leave It to Blanche =

- Miki Hood and Henry Kendall in the film.
- Directed by: Harold Young
- Written by: Rowland Brown; Brock Williams
- Produced by: Irving Asher
- Starring: Henry Kendall; Olive Blakeney; Miki Hood
- Cinematography: Basil Emmott
- Production company: Warner Brothers
- Distributed by: First National Film Distributors
- Release date: 24 August 1934
- Running time: 51 minutes
- Country: United Kingdom
- Language: English

Leave It to Blanche (also known as February Twenty-ninth) is a 1934 British comedy film directed by Harold Young and starring Henry Kendall, Olive Blakeney and Miki Hood. It was written by Rowland Brown and Brock Williams, and was made as a quota quickie.

It was made at Teddington Studios by the British subsidiary of Warner Brothers.

== Preservation status ==
The British Film Institute National Archive holds a collection of stills but no film or video materials.

== Plot ==
Peter and Doris Manners are happily married couple. Busybody Blanche Wetherby suggests to Doris that to rid Peter of his obsession with golf, she should pretend to be having a fling with film actor Philip Amesbury. David gets wind of this, and colludes with Philip to stage a mock shooting scene. Doris is taken in, until she discovers blank cartridges in the gun. She turns the tables on Peter by swapping the blanks for real bullets, and scares Peter. When they make up, they make sure not to speak to Blanche again.

== Cast ==
- Henry Kendall as Peter Manners
- Miki Hood as Doris Manners
- Olive Blakeney as Blanche Wetherby
- Griffith Jones as Philip Amesbury
- Rex Harrison as Ronnie
- Hamilton Keene as Brewster
- Julian Royce as Patteridge
- Elizabeth Jenns as Blossom
- Harold Warrender as guardee
- Phyllis Stanley as singer

== Reception ==
Kine Weekly wrote: "It is slowly developed, very thin in material, and undistinguished in characterisation. ... There is very little snap or sparkle to the comedy situations, which are produced in a workmanlike, if pedestrian, manner. The plot is obvious throughout, and there is little subtlety either in humour or production."

The Daily Film Renter wrote: "Henry Kendall gives smooth showing in characteristic role, Olive Blakeney scoring as interfering female. ... This not unamusing little film provides a fair quota of entertainment."
