= Brock Williams (screenwriter) =

English screenwriter (1894–1964)

- Born: 8 July 1894; Truro, Cornwall, England
- Died: 19 February 1964 (aged 69); Richmond, Surrey, England
- Occupation: Screenwriter
- Years active: 1930 – 1962

Brock Williams (8 July 1894 – 19 February 1964) was a prolific English screenwriter with over 100 films to his credit between 1930 and 1962. He also had a brief directorial career, and later also worked in television. Two of his novels, The Earl of Chicago and Uncle Willie and the Bicycle Shop were both adapted into films.

== Career ==
A native of Cornwall, in 1930 Williams joined Teddington Studios, the British arm of Warner Brothers, where he would spend the next 15 years. The 1930s was the golden age of the quota quickie, when Teddington was churning out quickly and cheaply shot films by the week, so work was plentiful. With few exceptions, these films were deemed of ephemeral value, with no worthwhile life after their first cinema run. The unfortunate result for modern film historians is that a good proportion are now classed as lost films, while those that have survived did so more by chance than intention. Films on which Williams worked included three early Michael Powell ventures Something Always Happens, The Girl in the Crowd and Someday, of which only the first is still extant. Between 1936 and 1939 he also formed part of a regular four-way working partnership with director Arthur B. Woods, producer Irving Asher and cinematographer Basil Emmott, most notably on Q Planes.

The quota quickie, (Cinematograph Films Act 1927), assembly line died with the outbreak of World War II, when Britain's major studios started to concentrate on making fewer pictures with higher production values and quality, often with an overtly patriotic and propagandistic tone. Williams remained contracted to Teddington until 1944, scripting such films as Contraband and Candlelight in Algeria. He then went freelance, starting with the Gainsborough ghost story A Place of One's Own in 1945.

Williams made two forays into film directing, with the 1947 Phyllis Calvert melodrama The Root of All Evil and I'm a Stranger (1952), a comedy starring Greta Gynt. He spent the rest of his film career mainly in the 1950s B-movie fields of thrillers and crime, with his last credits coming in two Lance Comfort productions in 1961 and 1962. He also ventured into television, scripting eight episodes of early police procedural drama Fabian of the Yard for the BBC (1955–56), five episodes of historical adventure serial The Gay Cavalier for Associated-Rediffusion (1957), and six of The New Adventures of Charlie Chan for ITC Entertainment (1957–58). Williams died on 19 February 1964, aged 69.

== Filmography ==
- Enter the Queen (1930)
- His First Car (1930)
- Black Coffee (1931)
- Rodney Steps In (1931)
- The Eternal Feminine (1931)
- Immediate Possession (1931)
- We Dine at Seven (1931)
- Almost a Divorce (1931)
- Chin Chin Chinaman (1931)
- The Wrong Mr. Perkins (1931)
- Peace and Quiet (1931)
- Self Made Lady (1932)
- Condemned to Death (1932)
- The Lacquered Box (1932)
- Flat No. 9 (1932)
- Don't Be a Dummy (1932)
- Looking on the Bright Side (1932)
- Her First Affaire (1932)
- Double Wedding (1933)
- The Thirteenth Candle (1933)
- Head of the Family (1933)
- Mr. Quincey of Monte Carlo (1933)
- What Happened to Harkness? (1934)
- The Lash (1934)
- The Silver Spoon (1934)
- Leave It to Blanche (1934)
- Nine Forty-Five (1934)
- The Life of the Party (1934)
- Too Many Millions (1934)
- The Blue Squadron (1934)
- Something Always Happens (1934)
- The Girl in the Crowd (1935)
- Crime Unlimited (1935)
- Hello, Sweetheart (1935)
- Someday (1935)
- Widow's Might (1935)
- Mr. Cohen Takes a Walk (1936)
- Wolf's Clothing (1936)
- Faithful (1936)
- They Didn't Know (1936)
- It's in the Bag (1936)
- Where's Sally? (1936)
- Fair Exchange (1936)
- Crown v. Stevens (1936)
- Hail and Farewell (1936)
- Irish for Luck (1936)
- The Vulture (1937)
- The Windmill (1937)
- Wanted! (1937)
- Don't Get Me Wrong (1937)
- The Windmill (1937)
- You Live and Learn (1937)
- Merry Comes to Town (1937)
- Gypsy (1937)
- The Singing Cop (1938)
- The Dark Stairway (1938)
- Thistledown (1938)
- It's in the Blood (1938)
- Q Planes (1939)
- Murder Will Out (1939)
- Confidential Lady (1939)
- His Brother's Keeper (1940)
- The Earl of Chicago (1940)
- The Midas Touch (1940)
- Contraband (1940)
- The Briggs Family (1940)
- Two for Danger (1940)
- George and Margaret (1940)
- The Prime Minister (1941)
- Fingers (1941)
- The Peterville Diamond (1942)
- Flying Fortress (1942)
- This Was Paris (1942)
- The Night Invader (1943)
- The Dark Tower (1943)
- Candlelight in Algeria (1944)
- The Hundred Pound Window (1944)
- A Place of One's Own (1945)
- The Root of All Evil (1947)
- Dancing with Crime (1947)
- Tony Draws a Horse (1950)
- I'm a Stranger (1952)
- The Night Won't Talk (1952)
- Three Steps in the Dark (1953)
- Meet Mr. Callaghan (1954)
- Isn't Life Wonderful! (1954)
- Meet Mr. Malcolm (1954)
- The Harassed Hero (1954)
- The Gilded Cage (1955)
- The Time of His Life (1955)
- High Terrace (1956)
- Date with Disaster (1957)
- Stormy Crossing (1958)
- Naked Fury (1959)
- Strictly Confidential (1959)
- Carry on Constable (1960)
- Trouble with Eve (1960)
- Operation Cupid (1960)
- The Gentle Trap (1960)
- Ticket to Paradise (1961)
- Rag Doll (1961)
- The Painted Smile (1962)
