= Joyce Kirby =

British actress (1915–1985)

- Postcard image
- Born: 15 March 1915; St. Margarets, London, England
- Died: 1985; Surrey, England
- Occupation: Actress

Joyce Kirby (15 March 1915 – 1985) was a British actress. On stage from childhood and a dancer in Cochrane shows, she appeared in several British films of the 1930s.

== Selected filmography ==
- The Midshipmaid (1932)
- A Safe Proposition (1932)
- Britannia of Billingsgate (1933)
- It's a Boy (1933)
- The Fire Raisers (1934)
- Are You a Mason? (1934)
- Hail and Farewell (1936)
- Mayfair Melody (1937)
- The Compulsory Wife (1937)
- Ship's Concert (1937)
