= The Viper (1938 film) =

1938 film

- Frame from the film
- Directed by: Roy William Neill
- Written by: John Dighton; Reginald Purdell
- Produced by: Irving Asher
- Starring: Claude Hulbert; Betty Lynne; Hal Walters
- Cinematography: Basil Emmott
- Distributed by: Warner Brothers-First National Productions
- Release date: 1 March 1938
- Running time: 75 minutes
- Country: United Kingdom
- Language: English

The Viper is a 1938 British slapstick comedy film directed by Roy William Neill and starring Claude Hulbert, Betty Lynne and Hal Walters. It was written by John Dighton and Reginald Purdell.

The film was a sequel to the previous year's The Vulture, with Hulbert and Walters reprising their roles. Lesley Brook also features in both films, but in unrelated roles. Neill replaced Ralph Ince, director of The Vulture, as Ince had been killed in a road accident shortly after that film's release.

== Preservation status ==
The film is included on the British Film Institute's "75 Most Wanted" list of missing British feature films. The BFI holds production stills but no film or video material.

== Plot ==
Amateur sleuth Cedric Gull simultaneously investigates two mysteries: his friend's niece Jenny has been accused of theft; and cabaret dancer Gaby Toulong is being pursued by a Devil's Island escapee known as The Viper.

== Cast ==
- Claude Hulbert as Cedric Gull
- Betty Lynne as Gaby Toulong
- Hal Walters as Stiffy Mason
- Lesley Brook as Jenny
- Fred Groves as Inspector Bradlaw
- Dino Galvani as The Viper
- Boris Ranevski as Carlos
- Harvey Braban as Jagger
- Reginald Purdell as announcer

== Reception ==
The Monthly Film Bulletin wrote: "There is nothing subtle about this theme; it is absurd and confusing. Claude Hulbert and Hal Walters act very well when alone together, but are otherwise hampered by the rest of the cast who are colourless. The slapstick episodes are embarrassing, and though the photography is good the direction is uninspired."

Kine Weekly wrote: "Slapstick mixture of comic crime and knockabout situations, which labours hard to be really funny, but signally fails in effect. The tortuous disguises and absurd contretemps of a pseudo-criminologist have been overworked in countless previous films, and this one breaks no new ground. The production may have a mild appeal for Claude Hulbert fans, but for the rest its humorous quality will seem merely in proportion to the energy with which the old automatic gags are put over. ... Considerable expense has apparently gone in the production of gadgets and stunts for this picture which would have been better devoted to a more humorous story and funnier dialogue."

The Daily Film Renter wrote: "Put over on the broadest of lines, the plot moves well, but a great deal of the humour is forced, and the climax features a not particularly funny bout of custard-pie slapstick. ... Claude Hulbert again essays the role of Gull, working with gusto, and even masquerading as a cabaret dance girl when occasion demands. Betty Lynne is excellent as a vivacious French girl, and Lesley Brook is an attractive heroine."

Picturegoer wrote: "Slapstick crime story which finds it difficult to be really funny. Claude Hulbert is well suited to the burlesque he has to give of a detective in search of a thief and a desperado escaped from Devil's Island, but he has to make bricks with the minimum of straw."
