= Simply Terrific =

1938 film

- Trade advertisement from The Daily Film Renter (15 February 1938)
- Directed by: Roy William Neill
- Written by: Basil Dillon; Anthony Hankey
- Story by: Basil Woon
- Produced by: Irving Asher
- Starring: Claude Hulbert; Reginald Purdell; Patricia Medina
- Cinematography: Robert LaPresle
- Production company: Warner Brothers-First National Productions
- Distributed by: Warner Bros.
- Release date: March 1938
- Running time: 72 minutes
- Country: United Kingdom
- Language: English

Simply Terrific is a 1938 British comedy film directed by Roy William Neill and starring Claude Hulbert, Reginald Purdell and Patricia Medina. It was written by Basil Dillon and Anthony Hankey and made at Teddington Studios by the British subsidiary of Warner Bros.

== Preservation status ==
The British Film Institute has classed Simply Terrific as a lost film. Its National Archive holds a collection of stills but no film or video.

== Plot ==
Wealthy but gullible Rodney Cherridew wants to marry Heather Carfax but must first satisfy her father, Sir Walter Carfax, that he is a success in business. He meets hard-up Sam Todd and together they open a company called "Socko Ltd", operating from a luxurious office. Sir Walter is impressed and offers to market their product, without knowing what it is – because Cherridew and Todd don't know either. WIth luck they meet a kerbside flower-seller who has a recipe for a miracle hangover cure. This becomes Socko.

== Cast ==
- Claude Hulbert as Rodney Cherridew
- Reginald Purdell as Sam Todd
- Zoe Wynn as Goldie Divine
- Patricia Medina as Heather Carfax
- Aubrey Mallalieu as Sir Walter Carfax
- Glen Alyn as Stella Hemingway
- Hugh French as Dickie
- Laura Wright as Annie Hemingway
- Ian McLean as Foster
- Frederick Burtwell

== Reception ==
The Monthly Film Bulletin wrote: The film is padded with much funny business which is not very funny and tends to make it tedious. Claude Hulbert makes a brilliant sucker, and Zoe Wynn makes Goldie quite an efficient golddigger, though her incessantly cynical intonation becomes monotonous. Glen Alyn overacts as Stella and makes a sad hash of a cockney accent. Aubrey Mallalieu gives a good performance as Sir Walter. The direction and photography are adequate."

Kine Weekly wrote: "Here is a farcical comedy which fails by a long chalk to live up to its optimistic title. The entertainment is not even moderately good, let alone terrific. Pedestrian in development and laboured in its humour, it will get short shrift from other than uncritical audiences."

The Daily Film Renter wrote: "A great deal of the comedy is feeble, while tipsy humours are over-stressed, and the plot leads nowhere. Conviction is seldom within hailing distance, and characterisation is of a poor variety. Aubrey Mallalieu manages to make bricks without any appreciable amount of straw, although it seems a pity that this dignified actor is made to play a 'drunk' scene. Claude Hulbert exploits his familiar asininities but has little opportunity to shine, while Reginald Purdell is similarly handicapped as his partner in crime."

Picturegoer wrote: "Pedestrian in development and laboured in humour, this Claude Hulbert comedy is not even moderately entertaining."

Picture Show wrote: "Claude Hulbert and Reginald Purdell make an amusing comedy team in this production. ... There is comparatively little action, humour relying chiefly on the dialogue, which is quite bright. The supporting cast is good, direction efficient."
