= Variety Jubilee =

1943 British film by Maclean Rogers

- Directed by: Maclean Rogers
- Written by: Kathleen Butler
- Based on: a story by Mabel Constanduros
- Produced by: F.W. Baker
- Starring: Reginald Purdell; Ellis Irving; Lesley Brook; Betty Warren
- Cinematography: Geoffrey Faithfull
- Edited by: A. Charles Knott
- Music by: Percival Mackey
- Production company: Butcher's Film Service
- Distributed by: Butcher's Film Service
- Release date: 14 June 1943
- Running time: 92 minutes
- Country: United Kingdom
- Language: English

Variety Jubilee is a 1943 British historical musical film directed by Maclean Rogers and starring Reginald Purdell, Ellis Irving and Lesley Brook. It was written by Kathleen Butler based on a story by Mabel Constanduros, and depicts life in a London music hall from 1892 to the Second World War. It was made at the Riverside Studios in Hammersmith. The film was re-released in 1945, to capitalise on the popularity of Ealing's Champagne Charlie.

== Plot ==
The film chronicles three generations of a family of music hall owners. At the start of the 20th century, two former variety artists, Joe Swan and Kit Burns, become partners in running a music hall. The First World War brings the death of Kit's son, and the end of the war a decline in popularity of music halls. Joe and Kit's business falls into disrepair, and finally, Kit and his wife die in poverty. Eventually, Kit's grandson successfully resurrects the family music hall, before joining the RAF to fight in the second World War.

== Cast ==
- Reginald Purdell as Joe Swan
- Ellis Irving as Kit Burns
- Lesley Brook as Evelyn Vincent
- Betty Warren as Florrie Forde
- Tom E. Finglass as Eugene Stratton
- John Rorke as Gus Elen
- Marie Lloyd Jr. as Marie Lloyd
- George Robey as himself
- Charles Coborn as himself
- Ella Retford as herself
- Charles Shadwell as himself
- Joan Winters as herself
- Nat Ayer as himself
- Slim Rhyder as himself
- Tessa Deane as herself
- Wilson, Keppel and Betty as themselves
- Band of the Coldstream Guards as themselves
- Peter Noble as chairman
- Louis Bradfield as Chris Burns
- Amy Dalby as suffragette
- Arthur Hambling as commissionaire
- Bryan Herbert as guest at theatre opening
- Vi Kaley as Evelyn's dresser
- David Keir as theatre bar patron
- Pat McGrath as Kit Burns Jr
- George Merritt as music hall chairman

== Critical reception ==
The Monthly Film Bulletin wrote: "Direction and production as a whole are as simple as this story, content to present the variety turns which are the main reason for the film."

Radio Times gave the film three out of five stars, noting a "simple, nostalgic tribute to the British music hall...The film consists largely of musical variety acts performed by numerous forgotten old-timers of a bygone era, with Marie Lloyd Jr impersonating her famous mother. Comedian George Robey, a team of cancan dancers and the band of the Coldstream Guards are also among the arcane and rather touching attractions."

== Bibliography ==
- Harper, Sue. Picturing the Past: The Rise and Fall of the British Costume Film. British Film Institute, 1994.
- Murphy, Robert. Realism and Tinsel: Cinema and Society in Britain 1939-48. Routledge, 1992.
