= Leonora Corbett =

British actress (1908–1960)

- Born: 28 June 1908; London, England
- Died: 29 July 1960 (aged 52); Vleuten, Utrecht, Netherlands
- Years active: 1932–1948

Leonora Corbett (28 June 1908 – 29 July 1960) was an English actress, noted for her charm and elegance in stage roles, and for a number of films made in the 1930s.

== Life and career ==
Corbett was born in London, the daughter of Richard Ashwin Corbett, and was educated at Oxford High School. On leaving school she studied dress designing for two years, but decided that she would prefer the stage. She made her debut in a small part at the Everyman Theatre, Hampstead in 1927, and spent a season with the Festival Theatre Company at Cambridge. In 1930–31 she was a member of the repertory company of the Everyman, where she played a dozen roles ranging from the classics to recent works by A. A. Milne and Noël Coward. Her West End debut was in November 1931 in Lady in Waiting by Harry Graham and Jacques Natanson. The Times praised the gaiety and charm of her performance. The film producer Michael Balcon recruited her in 1932 for Gaumont-British, and she appeared in her first film, Love on Wheels, the same year. The critic in The Times was unimpressed by her screen performance: "In the début of Miss Leonora Corbett as a leading lady of the film there is more of promise than achievement. She affects a charm which she has not and neglects the charm which is hers on the stage."

In August 1932 Corbett appeared at the Malvern Festival under the directorship of Sir Barry Jackson, appearing with Cedric Hardwicke and Ralph Richardson in Shaw's Too True to Be Good, which transferred to the West End. Corbett made her Broadway debut in the role of the ghost, Elvira, in the first American production of Coward's comedy Blithe Spirit which ran for 657 performances from 5 November 1941. A later Broadway appearance was as Sybil Bennett in Park Avenue by George S. Kaufman, Nunnally Johnson, Arthur Schwartz and Ira Gershwin in 1947.

Corbett, who had been in a relationship with MP Robert Bernays until after the latter met his future wife, married John Francis Royal, formerly vice-president of the American National Broadcasting Company. She died in Vleuten in the Netherlands, aged 52. The obituarist in The Times wrote of her, "She had a style of her own in elegance and gaiety, well suited to the more sophisticated comedy of the thirties. Her charm and wit were as effectively employed off the stage as on it, and she found and gave much amusement in London society and later in Paris."

== Film roles ==
- Love on Wheels – Jane Russell (1932)
- The Constant Nymph – Florence (1933)
- Friday the Thirteenth – Dolly (1933)
- Wild Boy – Gladys (1934)
- Warn London – Jill (1934)
- Lady in Danger – Marcelle (1934)
- Heart's Desire – Frances Wilson (1935)
- Royal Cavalcade – nurse (1935)
- Living Dangerously – Helen Pryor (1936)
- The Happy Family – Barbara Hutt (1936)
- The Price of Folly – Christine (1937)
- Farewell Again – Lady Joan (1937)
- I, Claudius – Caesonia (1937)
- Night Alone – Vi Hanway (1938)
- Anything to Declare? – Helaine Frank (1938)
- Under Your Hat – Carole Markoff (1940)
- Fingers – Bonita Grant (1940)

Source: British Film Institute.
