= Many Tanks Mr. Atkins =

1938 film

- Directed by: Roy William Neill
- Based on: John Dighton; Austin Melford; J. O. C. Orton; Reginald Purdell
- Produced by: Jerome Jackson
- Starring: Claude Hulbert; Reginald Purdell; Barbara Greene
- Cinematography: Basil Emmott; Geoffrey Faithfull
- Production company: Warner Brothers-First National Productions
- Distributed by: Warner Brothers
- Release date: December 1938
- Running time: 68 minutes
- Country: United Kingdom
- Language: English

Many Tanks Mr. Atkins is a 1938 British comedy war film directed by Roy William Neill and starring Claude Hulbert, Reginald Purdell and Barbara Greene.

It was made as a quota quickie by Warner Brothers at the company's Teddington Studios in London. The film's sets were designed by the art director Peter Proud.

== Plot summary ==
The troublesome Private Nutter is posted from regiment to regiment.

== Cast ==
- Claude Hulbert as Claude Fishlock
- Reginald Purdell as Pete Nutter
- Barbara Greene as Rosemary Edghill
- Davy Burnaby as Lord Fishlock
- Frederick Burtwell as Colonel Edghill
- Jack Melford as Captain Torrent
- Arthur Hambling as Sergeant Major Hornett
- Edward Lexy as Sergeant Butterworth
- Edmund Breon as Colonel
- Ralph Truman as Zanner
- Dorothy Seacombe as Mrs Hornett

== Bibliography ==
- Chibnall, Steve. Quota Quickies: The Birth of the British 'B' Film. British Film Institute, 2007.
