= Man Alive! (play) =

British comedy play

- Written by: John Dighton
- Original language: English
- Genre: Comedy

Premiere
- Date premiered: 12 September 1955
- Place premiered: Pleasure Gardens Theatre, Folkestone

Man Alive! is a comedy play by the British writer John Dighton. In a strange turnaround at a department store in Oxford Street, a shop window mannequin comes to life and takes over the store while the unpopular manager is temporarily turned into a dummy.

After premiering at the Pleasure Gardens Theatre in Folkestone it transferred to the Aldwych Theatre where it ran for 84 performances from 14 June to 25 August 1956. The cast included Robertson Hare, Brian Reece, Wendy Craig, Joan Hickson and Joan Sims.

== Bibliography ==
- Wearing, J.P. The London Stage 1950-1959: A Calendar of Productions, Performers, and Personnel. Rowman & Littlefield, 2014.
