= Mayfair Girl =

- Frame from the film
- Directed by: George King
- Written by: Brandon Fleming
- Produced by: Irving Asher
- Starring: Sally Blane; John Stuart; Glen Alyn
- Cinematography: Basil Emmott
- Production company: Warner Bros.
- Distributed by: Warner Bros.
- Release date: September 1933
- Running time: 67 minutes
- Country: United Kingdom
- Language: English

Mayfair Girl is a 1933 British crime film directed by George King and starring Sally Blane, John Stuart and Glen Alyn. It was written by Brandon Fleming. A quota quickie, it was made at Teddington Studios by the British subsidiary of Warner Bros.

== Preservation status ==
The British Film Institute National Archive holds a collection of ephemera and stills but no film or video materials.

== Plot ==
Brenda Mason, an American pleasure-seeking society girl, visits a fashionable gambling club with Dick Porter, a moneyed layabout. They drink heavily and Brenda falls into a drunken sleep. Porter accuses Captain Merrow, owner of the club, of running a crooked roulette game. Merror shoots and kills him, and then frames Brenda for the crime. She is arrested, found guilty, and sentenced to death. Her lawyer, Robert Blair, who is secretly in love with her, gets her off the hook.

== Cast ==
- Sally Blane as Brenda Mason
- John Stuart as Robert Blair
- D. A. Clarke-Smith as Captain Merrow
- Glen Alyn as Santa
- Roland Culver as Dick Porter
- James Carew
- Philip Strange
- Charles Hawtrey
- Anna Lee

== Reception ==
Kine Weekly wrote: "Society murder drama, a protracted expose of London's smart set, which is weighed down and diverted from the iines of crisp entertainment by a welter of tedious and unconvincing detail."

The Daily Film Renter wrote: "Inane cocktail set are ruthlessly exposed in succession of scenes depicting life of 'bright young things.' Main plot develops convincingly, leading up to suspenseful climax in which heroine's lawyer fixes guilt on real culprit. Excellent photography and interesting sets, but direction errs on side of over-emphasis at times."

Picturegoer wrote: "Novelettish murder story, which suffers from being drawn out with tedious detail. It attempts to expose the 'smart set,' but lacks crispness and dramatic force enough to hold the interest. Except for Sally Blane and John Stuart, who are quite good, the acting is definitely weak."
