= Guest of Honour (1934 film) =

- Trade show advertisement
- Directed by: George King
- Written by: W. Scott Darling
- Based on: play The Man from Blankley's (1930) by F. Anstey
- Starring: Henry Kendall; Miki Hood; Edward Chapman; Margaret Yarde
- Production company: Warner Brothers First National Productions
- Release date: 1934
- Country: UK
- Language: English

Guest of Honour (also known as Gay Lord Strathpepper) is a 1934 British quota quickie comedy film directed by George King and starring Henry Kendall, Miki Hood, Edward Chapman and Joan Playfair. It was written by W. Scott Darling based on the 1903 play The Man from Blankley's by F. Anstey, which had been previously filmed as the Paramount silent The Fourteenth Man (1920) and the John Barrymore talkie The Man from Blankley's (1930).

In the film, an aristocrat unmasks a blackmailer.

== Preservation status ==
The British Film Institute National Archive holds a collection of stills but no film or video materials.

== Plot ==
Lord Strathpeffer is in love with Marjorie, who has gone missing since her father was involved in a financial crash. They meet again at the big London store Blankleys, where she has gone to arrange for a man to masquerade as Lord Ghastleigh, who was due to appear at a dinner party given by her boss, but who has cancelled at the last minute. The role falls to Strathpeffer, and farcical adventures involving blackmail ensue.

== Cast ==
- Henry Kendall as Lord Strathpeffer
- Edward Chapman as Montague Tidmarsh
- Miki Hood as Marjorie
- Margaret Yarde as Emma Tidmarsh
- Eve Gray as Cissie Poffley
- Joan Playfair as Mrs Bodfish
- Hay Plumb as Mr Bodfish
- Helen Ferrers as Mrs Gilwattle
- Cecil Humphreys as Mr Gilwattle
- Louis Goodrich as butler

== Reception ==
Kine Weekly wrote: "The comedy in this adaptation of F. W. Anstey's farce, The Man from Blankleys, is rather dated and not too spontaneous, Cast, photography and production are efficient, however ... George King has directed intelligently."

The Daily Film Renter wrote: "Mediocre direction and stilted acting are main disadvantages. Entertainment is vested solely in smooth portrayal by Henry Kendall. Supporting feature for the indulgent."

Picture Show wrote: "Fair comedy entertainment, although there is little originality in the humour and situations. The cast is competent."
