= Colin Keith-Johnston =

British actor (1896–1980)

- Publicity photo, dated 1950
- Born: 8 October 1896; London, England
- Died: 3 January 1980 (aged 83); London, England
- Occupation: Actor
- Years active: 1927–1959

Colin Keith-Johnston MC (8 October 1896 – 3 January 1980) was a British actor.

Keith-Johnston was born in London, the son of Robert Keith-Johnston and Jessy Macfie, and was a prominent actor of the stage. As well as film appearances, he appeared onstage as Stanhope in the first production of Journey's End in the United States.

He played hero Mr. Darcy in Helen Jerome's Broadway-hit adaptation of Pride and Prejudice at the Music Box Theatre in 1935. This was a notable role, the first to make Darcy a central part of the love story and to emphasize throughout the play the character's passion for and physical attraction to heroine Elizabeth Bennet. Colin married Margaret Cookson (cousin of actors Marjorie Browne and Joy Launor Heyes) and their son Hugo Keith-Johnston born in 1954 was a successful child actor who appeared in Not In Front of the Children (1968) for BBC Television with Ronald Hines and Wendy Craig.

He fought in World War One as an officer in the Bedfordshire Regiment and was awarded an MC in the 1917 New Year Honours. The citation said that it was awarded for: "For conspicuous gallantry in action. He rallied men of several units, led them forward, and captured many prisoners. He continued at duty until relieved, although wounded three times."

== Filmography ==
Year	Title	Role	Notes
1927	Somehow Good	Doctor	
1929	Lucky in Love	Captain Brian Fitzroy	
1933	Berkeley Square	Tom Pettigrew	
1934	Open All Night	Henry	
1937	The Price of Folly	Martin	
1939	Q Planes	Tower Controller	Uncredited
1947	The Exile	Captain Bristol	
1947	The Paradine Case	Clerk of the Court	Uncredited
1948	Kiss the Blood off My Hands	Judge	
1948	Joan of Arc	Philip, Duke of Burgundy	
1948	Enchantment	The Eye	
1949	Love Happy	Actor	Uncredited
1950	Rogues of Sherwood Forest	Munster	Uncredited
1950	Fancy Pants	Twombley	
1958	The Left Handed Gun	John Tunstall	
