= Uncle Willie and the Bicycle Shop =

1948 novel

- First edition
- Author: Brock Williams
- Language: English
- Genre: Comedy
- Publisher: Harrap
- Publication date: 1948
- Publication place: United Kingdom
- Media type: Print

Uncle Willie and the Bicycle Shop is a 1948 comedy novel by the British writer Brock Williams. It is set in the Edwardian era and was partly inspired by his own years growing up. Uncle Willie is the black sheep of the family, and a drunken embarrassment to his respectable relations. However, when he is given a small bicycle shop to manage it surprisingly prospers.

== Film adaptation ==
In 1953 it was made into the British film Isn't Life Wonderful! directed by Harold French and starring Cecil Parker, Eileen Herlie and Donald Wolfit.

== Bibliography ==
- Goble, Alan. The Complete Index to Literary Sources in Film. Walter de Gruyter, 1999.
