= Phyllis Stanley =

British actress (1914–1992)

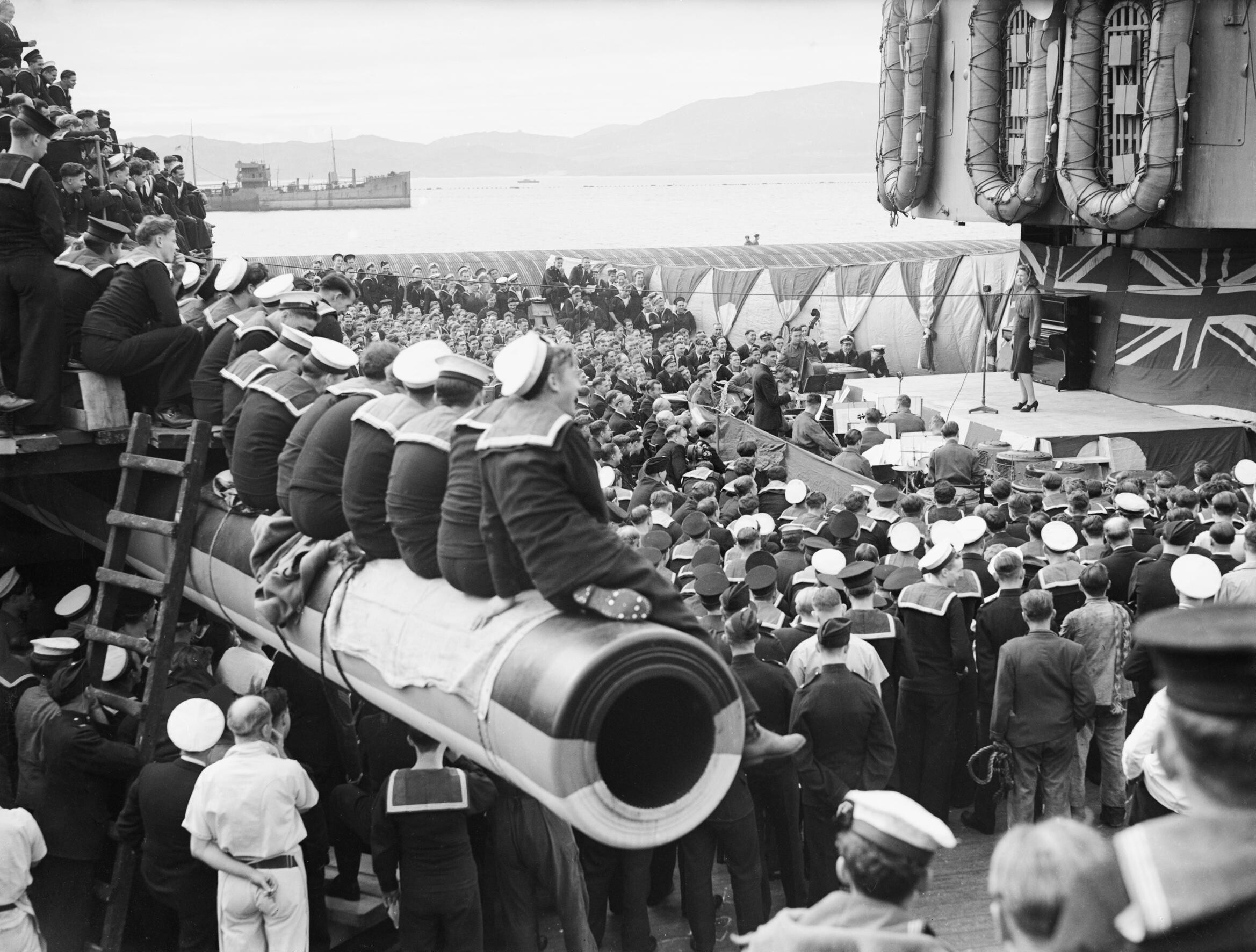
Phyllis Stanley is playing to a naval audience, during a show on the packed deck of HMS Nelson, 7 January 1943. Note the sailors sitting on one of the 16 inch (406 mm) guns in the foreground.

Phyllis Stanley (30 October 1914 – 12 March 1992) was a British actress.

== Personal life ==
During World War II, she shared a flat in West End of London with the Scottish heiress Jane Corby. She became a United States citizen on January 23, 1953.

Miller married Colonel Stephen Miller in Maidenhead, England, in April 1947.

== Partial filmography ==
- Leave It to Blanche (1934) - Singer
- Too Many Millions (1934) - Tamara
- Hello, Sweetheart (1935)
- Side Street Angel (1937) - Laura
- Command Performance (1937) - Olga
- Sidewalks of London (1938) - Della
- There Ain't No Justice (1939) - Elsie Mutch
- Jeannie (1941) - Mrs. Whitelaw
- The Next of Kin (1942) - Miss Clare, the dancer
- We'll Smile Again (1942) - Gina Cavendish
- They Met in the Dark (1943) - Lily Bernard
- One Exciting Night (1944) - Lucille
- Good-Time Girl (1948) - Ida (uncredited)
- Look Before You Love (1948) - Bettina Colby
- That Dangerous Age (1949) - Jane
- The Law and the Lady (1951) - Lady Sybil Minden
- Thunder on the Hill (1951) - Nurse Phillips
- Lovely to Look At (1952) - Prospective Investor Wife (uncredited)
- Rogue's March (1953) - Mabel (uncredited)
- Take Me to Town (1953) - Mrs. Edna Stoffer
- Her Twelve Men (1954) - Mrs. Curtis (uncredited)
- Strange Lady in Town (1955) - Mrs. Clegg (uncredited)
- The Black Sleep (1956) - Daphne
- The Seventh Sin (1957) - Dorothy Duvelle (uncredited)
