= Miki Hood =

British actress (1915–1994)

- Born: Barbara Mary Hood; 9 January 1915; Brentford, Middlesex, England
- Died: September 1994 (aged 79); Hitchin, Hertfordshire, England
- Other name: Barbara M. Hood
- Occupation: Actress
- Years active: 1934 - 1948 (film)

Barbara Mary "Miki" Hood (9 January 1915 – September 1994) was an English stage and film actress.

== Biography ==
"Miki Hood" was born Barbara Mary Hood on 9 January 1915 in Brentford, Middlesex, England.

Hood was a stage and film actress who was described as a "glamour girl" with a "sultry gaze." She played the female lead in the 1934 film Guest of Honour.

== Filmography ==
Year	Title	Role	Notes
1934	Guest of Honour	Marjorie Seaton	
1934	Leave It to Blanche	Doris Manners	
1934	The Private Life of Don Juan	Minor Role	Uncredited
1935	Trust the Navy	Andree Terraine	
1936	Fame	Joan Riley	
1936	This'll Make You Whistle	Clarice	
1936	Three Maxims	Valentine	
1937	London Melody	Friend of Marius	
1939	Inspector Hornleigh	Ann Gordon, Owner Pheasant Inn	
1940	The Thief of Bagdad	Citizen	Uncredited
1948	A Piece of Cake	Mrs. Short	(final film role)
