= Hail and Farewell (film) =

- Reginald Purdell and Claude Hulbert in the film
- Directed by: Ralph Ince
- Written by: John Dighton; Reginald Purdell; Brock Williams
- Produced by: Irving Asher; Jerome Jackson
- Starring: Claude Hulbert; Bruce Lester; Wally Patch
- Cinematography: Basil Emmott
- Distributed by: Warner Brothers-First National Productions
- Release date: 27 April 1936
- Running time: 74 minutes
- Country: United Kingdom
- Language: English

Hail and Farewell is a 1936 British quota quickie comedy film directed by Ralph Ince and starring Claude Hulbert, Bruce Lester and Wally Patch. It was written by John Dighton, Reginald Purdell and Brock Williams.

== Preservation status ==
The British Film Institute has classed Hail and Farewell as a lost film. Its National Archive holds a collection of ephemera but no film or video materials.

== Plot ==
As a returning troopship is nearing dock at Southampton, the news comes that plans have been changed and the servicemen will now have only six hours ashore before re-embarking for Egypt. The film follows the vartious fortunes of officers and Tommies throughout the day.

== Cast ==
- Claude Hulbert as Bert
- Bruce Lester as Peter
- Wally Patch as Sergeant Major
- Reginald Purdell as Nobby
- Joyce Kennedy as Mrs. Harvey
- Nicholas Hannen as Col. Harvey
- Moira Reed as Annie Turner
- Ivan Samson as Col. Oldham
- Henry Caine as Joe Perkins
- Marie Wright as Mrs. Perkins
- Joyce Kirby as Ruby

== Reception ==
The Monthly Film Bulletin wrote: "This is a very good film, well constructed, well photographed and well supplied with realistic and racy dialogue. The handling of the crowds and the excitement of arrival are extremely good and the fun is fresh and unstudied. The general acting level is very high, but Reginald Purdell who is also responsible for part of the dialogue, with Claude Hulbert as a foil, is the chief mirth raiser."

Kine Weekly wrote: "Rollocking comedy-drama of British Army life, combining thematic ingenuity with flawless character drawing and smart dialogue. The story contains many by-plots within its basic plot, and the cementing of the many into one complete and thoroughly entertaining whole is neatly and efficiently accomplished. Claude Hulbert and Reginald Purdell, both expert comedians, set the pace in the leading tole, and around them is built a versatile and resourceful supporting team. The atmosphere, too, is entirely convincing, and the direction experienced. Excellent light booking for the masses."

The Daily Film Renter wrote: "Neat story staged in six-hour leave period of battalion of British troops at Southampton between two long spells of foreign service. Episodic but smooth development details divergent adventures of bullying sergeant-major cowed by termagant wife and overpowering mother-in-law; colonel whose wife loves brother officer; soldier who wrongly imagines spouse unfaithful; bumptious youngster who meets correspondence sweetheart for first time, and two privates cleaned out by gold-digging cuties. Excellent staging, amusing comedy from Purdell-Hulbert team, and nimble direction add to general effect. Very good popular entertainment."

Picturegoer wrote: "Its main support is a broad sort of humour, supplied by Claude Hulbert and Reginald Purcell as Bert and Nobby, but there are other little character cameos which have more tender and sentimental application ....Wally Patch, too, gives valuable support in his own inimitable form of comedy."

Picture Show wrote: "This entertaining film deals with the adventures of four privates, a sergeant and colonel, during six hours' leave in Southampton from the troopship which has just brought them home and which is to take them away again after that brief interval. The film centres chiefly round Bert and Nobby – Claude Hulbert and Reginald Purdell – who set out to spend their gambling winnings on any girls they can find, but the affairs of the others are deftly interwoven. Wally Patch is excellent as the sergeant with a nagging wife, Nicholas Hannen and Joyce Kennedy convincing as the colonel and his wife who has fallen in love with another man, and Moira Reed good as the pseudo heiress whom another private wants to marry. Although comedy predominates, there are some touching scenes."
