= Edwin Styles =

British actor (1899–1960)

- Photo signed 1938
- Born: 13 January 1899; Chiswick, London, England
- Died: 20 December 1960 (aged 61); London, England
- Occupation: Actor
- Years active: 1933 - 1960

Edwin Styles (13 January 1899 – 20 December 1960) was a British stage comedian, pantomime actor, radio and TV performer and film actor.

== Partial filmography ==
- Hell Below (1933) - Herbert Standish - Flight Comdr.
- On the Air (1934) - Edwin Styles
- Road House (1934) - Archie Hamble
- Patricia Gets Her Man (1937) - Brian Maxwell
- The Five Pound Man (1937) - Richard Fordyce
- Adam and Evelyne (1949) - Bill Murray
- The Lady with a Lamp (1951) - Mr. Nightingale
- Derby Day (1952) - Sir George Forbes
- Penny Princess (1952) - Chancellor - Cobbler
- Top Secret (1952) - Barworth Superintendent
- The Accused (1953) - Solicitor
- The Weak and the Wicked (1954) - Seymour
- For Better, for Worse (1954) - Anne's Boss
- Isn't Life Wonderful! (1954) - Bamboula
- The Dam Busters (1955) - Observer At Trials
- Up in the World (1956) - Conjuror
- The Full Treatment (1960) - Doctor Roberts
- Out of the Shadow (1961) - (final film role)
