= The Man Who Made Diamonds =

1937 film

- Noel Madison (left) and J. Fisher White (centre) in the film
- Directed by: Ralph Ince
- Screenplay by: Michael Barringer; Anthony Hankey
- Produced by: Irving Asher
- Starring: Noel Madison; Lesley Brook; George Galleon
- Production company: Teddington Studios
- Release date: 1937
- Running time: 73 minutes
- Country: United Kingdom
- Language: English

The Man Who Made Diamonds is a lost 1937 British crime film directed by Ralph Ince and starring Noel Madison, James Stephenson and Lesley Brook. It was written by Michael Barringer and Anthony Hankey.

== Preservation status ==
The British Film Institute has classed The Man Who Made Diamonds as a lost film. Its National Archive holds a collection of ephemera and stills but no film or video materials.

== Plot summary ==
A professor invents a way of manufacturing diamonds.

== Cast ==
- Noel Madison as Joseph
- James Stephenson as Ben
- Lesley Brook as Helen Calthrop
- Wilfrid Lawson as Gallanie
- George Galleon as Tony
- Renee Gadd as Marianne
- Philip Ray as Tompkins
- Hector Abbas as Nichols
- J. Fisher White as Prof. Calthrop

== Reception ==
The Monthly Film Bulletin wrote: "The settings are good, especially those in the laboratory showing the Professor and Joseph manufacturing the diamonds. There is some first-class acting by Lesley Brook as the Professor's daughter; Renee Gadd as the foolish but faithful friend provides some genuinely comic relief, and Noel Madison as the ruthless villain of the piece grips one's attention from start to finish. ...Not suitable for children or adolescents."

Kine Weekly wrote: "Sensational crime thriller turning on a fantastic but gripping theme. ... Noel Madison presents a pretty portrait in villainy as Joseph; James Stephenson and Wilfred Lawson are good as a couple of crooks; but George Galleon is not too sure of himsell as Tony, Lesley Brook is colourless as Helen, and Renee Gadd is inclined to force the pace in a comedy role. ... In its pursuit of thrills, this crime melodrama has scant regard for reason, but the realism with which the thrills are enacted and draped with pseudoscientific detail thrusts the colourful rough-stuff well and truly home."

The Daily Film Renter wrote: "The Teddington studios have gone all out to make an unvarnished thriller for the purely popular market, and achieve their end in a subject which, while somewhat naive by critical standards, nevertheless has the right ingredients for the purpose. It has thrills and plenty of action, weird machinery and a certain sinister atmosphere, the latter owing to sincere acting by the main crook element, with a deal of artless humour and confected romance to round off its mass appeal."

Picture Show wrote: "It is all rather vague and rambling, with the villain (the diamond maker) meeting his death through climbing a pylon and being electrocuted."
