= Head of the Family (1933 film) =

1933 film

- Roland Culver, Pat Paterson, Irene Vanbrugh, and Arthur Maude in the film
- Directed by: John Daumery
- Written by: Brock Williams
- Produced by: Irving Asher
- Starring: Irene Vanbrugh; Arthur Maude; John Stuart
- Cinematography: Basil Emmott
- Production company: Warner Brothers
- Distributed by: Warner Brothers
- Release date: August 1933
- Running time: 66 minutes
- Country: United Kingdom
- Language: English

Head of the Family is a 1933 British drama film directed by John Daumery and starring Irene Vanbrugh, Arthur Maude and John Stuart. It was written by Brock Williams, and was made at Teddington Studios as a quota quickie.

== Preservation status ==
The British Film Institute National Archive holds no stills or ephemera, and no film or video materials.

== Plot ==
Stubborn aristocrat John Powis-Porter clashes with Bill Stanmore, the young head of a rival steel corporation. Powis-Porter refuses to sell his trademark and patents to Stanmore, and he and his family are soon reduced to destitution. In desperation, Powis-Porter secretly secures a job as a night porter at Stanmore's company. While on duty one evening, he catches a burglar, only to discover it is his own son, Manny. The incident brings him face-to-face with Stanmore for the first time. Common sense finally prevails: the two men decide to merge their business interests, and Powis-Porter's daughter, Geraldine, marries Stanmore.

== Cast ==
- Irene Vanbrugh as Mrs. Powis-Porter
- Arthur Maude as John Powis-Porter
- John Stuart as Bill Stanmore
- Pat Paterson as Geraldine Powis-Porter
- D. A. Clarke-Smith as Welsh
- Alexander Field as Bill Higgins
- Roland Culver as Manny
- Glen Alyn as Maisie
- Annie Esmond as Mrs. Slade

== Reception ==
Kine Weekly wrote: "An unconvincing British drama, the interesting story of which is handled with little sense of proportion. A tendency to exaggerate by the majority of the players and the stilted novelettish dialogue accentuate the absurdities that are allowed to creep into the development."

The Daily Film Renter wrote: "The direction fails to infuse the plot with much strength, the sequences being presented in a slipshod fashion. Irene Vanbrugh has a very insignificant part, appearing as Mrs. Porter. She does manage to suggest screen possibilities, however. Arthur Maude plays Porter with fair success. Pat Paterson as Geraldine, and John Stuart as Stanmore, are good, and Roland Culver shows promise as the wayward son, Alexander Field contributes a sound cameo as a cockney road .mender."

Picturegoer wrote: "Irene Vanbrugh's fine stage talent is, unhappily, not displayed to advantage in this unconvincing drama, which suffers from very novelettish dialogue and indifferent production. ... Except for John Stuart and Roland Culver, the cast over-acts, and, generally, the whole theme of social snobbery suffers from lack of dramatic force and exaggerated absurdities."

Picture Show wrote: "Too much talk in a talkie is the fault in this picture."
