= The Blue Squadron (1934 film) =

1934 British film by George King

- Trade advertisement from The Daily Film Renter (16 May 1934)
- Directed by: George King
- Written by: Brock Williams
- Produced by: Irving Asher
- Starring: Esmond Knight; John Stuart
- Cinematography: Basil Emmott
- Distributed by: Warner Brothers-First National Productions; Società Anonima Pittaluga
- Release date: September 1934
- Running time: 96 minutes
- Countries: United Kingdom; Italy
- Language: English

The Blue Squadron is a lost 1934 Anglo-Italian aviation drama film directed by George King and starring Esmond Knight and John Stuart. It was written by Brock Williams. The film was a co-production between Britain's Teddington Studios (the UK arm of Warner Brothers) and Italy's Pittaluga studios.

== Preservation status ==
The British Film Institute has classed The Blue Squadron as a lost film. Its National Archive holds a collection of ephemera and stills but no film or video materials.

== Plot ==
Two young officers in the Italian Royal Air Force compete for the hand of the attractive Elena and find their comradeship under strain as a result. Both try to impress her with daredevil aviation stunts which become increasingly reckless as they try to outdo each other in bravery. Finally, Knight goes too far and crashes his plane on a mountainside. Putting rivalry aside, Stuart courageously risks his own life to save his injured colleague and both realise that their friendship is more important than silly squabbling over a woman. They decide to let Elena make her own choice.

== Cast ==
- Esmond Knight as Captain Carlo Banti
- John Stuart as Colonel Mario Spada
- Greta Hansen as Elena
- Cecil Parker as Bianchi
- Ralph Reader as Verdi

== Reception ==
Kine Weekly wrote: "Aerial melodrama, the story of which as played agaimst interesting, authentic and thrilling scenes of the peace time activities of the ltalian Air Force. The theme itself creates few surprises, but its popular conventionalities are revitalised by the sweeping power and breadth of the detail. The aerial sequences are some of the best seen on the screen, and crowd the film's wide canvas with vigorous and hair raising action. The cast is an attractive one, every member of which plays his or her part with conviction, and the development, in spite of the film's length, is never guilty of idle or tedious moments. In fact, the picture is as popular as it is novel, the atmosphere is entirely new, and has in its make-up the elements essential to popular success."

The Daily Film Renter wrote: "Conventional plot relates dispute between bosom friends over girl, but main interest centred in flying sequences, with vivid scenes of air manceuvres and dramatic rescue of pilot, lost in the Alps. Pleasant characterisations and effective studio work welds with authentic Italian sequences to provide gripping entertainment for the great mass of patrons."

Picturegoer wrote: "It is somewhat hackneyed in theme, but it is as a spectacle that it entertains. The aerial work is excellent throughout. Although none of the artistes seem convincingly Italian, Esmond Knight and John Stuart as the two friends are sound, and Greta Hansen makes an attractive heroine."

Picture Show wrote: "Although the story is somewhat weak there are plenty of thrills in the exhibition of flying given by the great number of aircraft in their many maneouvres. Esmond Knight as the captain and John Stuart as the colonel make the most of their parts, but are not convincing in their portrayal of their screen nationality. Greta Hansen as Elene is disappointing. Photography and settings are excellent."
