= Henry Mollison =

British actor (1905–1985)

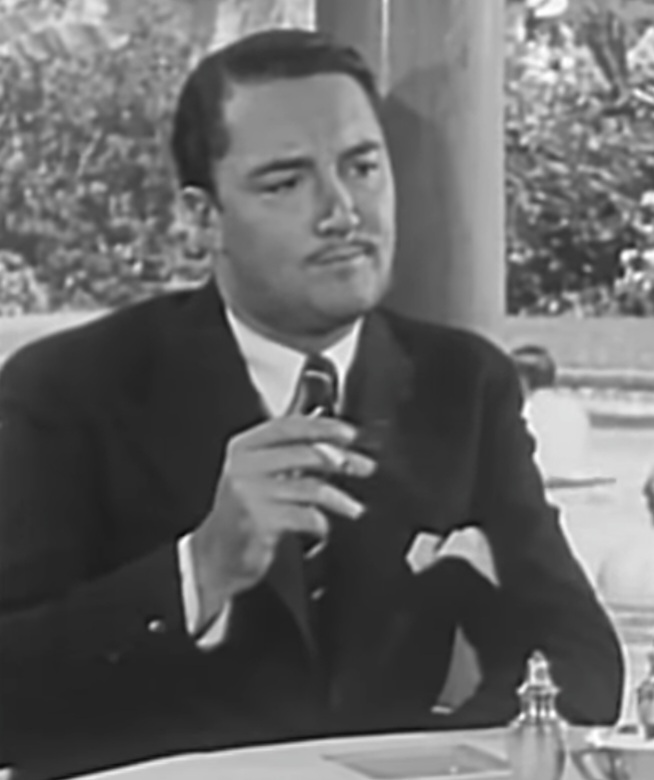
- Mollison in A Bride for Henry (1937)
- Born: Evelyn Henry Mollison; 21 February 1905; Dundee, Angus, Scotland
- Died: 19 July 1985 (aged 80); London, England
- Occupation: Actor
- Years active: 1928–1956
- Spouses: Jane Welsh (m. 1932; div. 1934) Lina Basquette (m. 1937; div. 1947)
- Relatives: Clifford Mollison (brother)

Evelyn Henry Mollison (21 February 1905 – 19 July 1985) was a British theatre and film actor. He was the brother of the actor Clifford Mollison.

During World War II, he was held as a Prisoner of War for five years by the Germans, after his ship was captured. During his time in the POW camp, he organized 56 shows for other prisoners. Following the war, he never completely returned to acting.

He was married to actresses Jane Welsh from 1932 to 1934 and Lina Basquette from 1937 until their divorce in 1947.

== Partial filmography ==
- Balaclava (1928)
- Knowing Men (1930)
- Third Time Lucky (1931)
- The Face at the Window (1932)
- Letting in the Sunshine (1933)
- Out of the Past (1933)
- Royal Cavalcade (1935)
- Drake of England (1935)
- Sing Me a Love Song (1935)
- McGlusky the Sea Rover (1935)
- Someday (1935)
- The Great Impersonation (1935)
- The Lone Wolf Returns (1935)
- The Music Goes 'Round (1936)
- Caught by Television (1936)
- They Met in a Taxi (1936)
- Counterfeit Lady (1936)
- Devil's Squadron (1936)
- Shakedown (1936)
- Find the Witness (1937)
- The Windmill (1937)
- A Bride for Henry (1937)
- Youth Takes a Fling (1938)
- Hungry Hill (1947)
- The Loves of Joanna Godden (1947)
- Whisky Galore! (1949)
- What the Butler Saw (1950)
- Chelsea Story (1951)
- The Man in the White Suit (1951)
- Front Page Story (1954)
