= Lesley Brook =

English actress (1917–2009)

- Born: 18 February 1917; Folkestone, Kent; United Kingdom
- Died: 7 February 2009 (aged 91); Odiham, Hampshire; United Kingdom
- Occupation: Actor
- Years active: 1937–1948

Lesley Brook (18 February 1917 – 7 February 2009) was a British stage, film and television actress. Married to an RAF pilot, Terry Spencer, she moved after the war to South Africa for 15 years before returning to the UK. They had three children. Cara, born in 1949 and Raina, born in 1958. They had a third child, a boy, but he died in a tragic accident, drowning in an unfenced swimming pool. She died just short of her 92nd birthday in 2009, her husband dying within 24 hours of her at the age of 90. On stage she appeared with the Royal Shakespeare Company at Stratford-on-Avon, including as Olivia in Twelfth Night in 1939.

== Filmography ==
- The Vulture (1937)
- The Man Who Made Diamonds (1937)
- Patricia Gets Her Man (1937)
- Side Street Angel (1937)
- The Viper (1938)
- The Dark Stairway (1938)
- Night Alone (1938)
- Glamour Girl (1938)
- Quiet Please (1938)
- It's in the Blood (1938)
- Dead Men Tell No Tales (1939)
- The Nursemaid Who Disappeared (1939)
- The Briggs Family (1940)
- Rose of Tralee (1942)
- The Bells Go Down (1943)
- Variety Jubilee (1943)
- I'll Walk Beside You (1943)
- When We Are Married (1943)
- Twilight Hour (1945)
- For You Alone (1945)
- The Trojan Brothers (1946)
- The Fool and the Princess (1948)
- House of Darkness (1948)
