= Ship's Concert =

- Trade advertisement from The Daily Film Renter (11 March 1937)
- Directed by: Leslie S. Hiscott
- Written by: John Dighton; Reginald Purdell
- Produced by: Irving Asher
- Starring: Claude Hulbert; Joyce Kirby; Henry Kendall
- Cinematography: Basil Emmott; Robert LaPresle
- Production company: Warner Brothers
- Distributed by: Warner Brothers
- Release date: April 1937
- Running time: 44 minutes
- Country: United Kingdom
- Language: English

Ship's Concert is a 1937 British musical film directed by Leslie S. Hiscott and starring Claude Hulbert, Joyce Kirby and Henry Kendall. It was written by John Dighton and Reginald Purdell, and made as a quota quickie at Teddington Studios by the British subsidiary of Warner Brothers.

== Preservation status ==
The British Film Institute National Archive holds a collection of stills but no film or video materials.

== Plot ==
Claude Stork and his wife Enid have won a holiday on a cruise ship. A steward discovers they have smuggled their cat aboard, but promises to keep quiet if Claude will organise a ship's concert to help stowaways Jack and Joyce (dancers) and Dickie (a singer) who are on board to try and impress producer Harry Bolton, who is holidaying on the ship.

== Cast ==
- Claude Hulbert as Claude Stork
- Joyce Kirby as Joyce
- Henry Kendall as Harry Bolton
- Enid Trevor as Enid Stork
- Jack Donohue as Jack
- Jack Heller as Dickie
- Glen Alyn as Plasta Seene
- Bruce Lester as Purser
- Reginald Purdell as Reggie
- George Galleon as Wireless Officer
- Gibson Gowland as Purser
- Patricia Burke as Geraldine Jackson
- Albert le Fre as Privett

== Reception ==
The Monthly Film Bulletin wrote: "The story is not very funny and the acting is frequently exaggerated. The film looks as if it had been made without much preparation or care. The best turn is Jack Donahue in his dance with his partner, Joyce Kirby."

Kine Weekly wrote: "Variety show with a luxury liner setting, this film is very small fry. The story employed to link the acts together is weak emough, but no weaker than the majority of the turns. It to fly high but soon comes a purler for want of original ideas and talent. It is just another quota quickie, and a slipshod one at that."

The Daily Film Renter wrote: "The story, though slight, and serving principally to lead up to the concert, which itself is not particularly impressive, has farcical possibilities, but they are not made the most of, and the result is a rather vague entertainment, its principal merits being handy footage and good sets. The strictures applying to the plot are also to some extent applicable to the performances, for although a cast, headed by Claude Hulbert, Enid Trevor and Henry Kendall, has been assembled, they have too little to do, and the variety material at the disposal of Joyce Kirby, Jack Donahue and Jackie Heller is not too bright, though the players all manage to get some laughs."

Picturegoer wrote: "The debut of Claude Hulbert and his wife, Enid Trevor, as a screen team is, I'm afraid, not an auspicious one. The film is a sort of variety show (or a variety show of sorts) set on a luxury liner with a hopelessly weak story to link the acts, which are weak enough themselves. The film falls between the stools of straight-forward vaudeville and screen musical comedy. Hulbert has little to do, but act as compére and whatever talent Joyce Kirby, Jack Donohue, and Jackie Heller may possess fails to shine through the amateurish presentation."
