= Fingers (1941 film) =

- Review spread in Picture Show (15 March 1941)
- Directed by: Herbert Mason
- Written by: Brock Williams
- Produced by: A.M.Salomon
- Starring: Clifford Evans; Leonora Corbett; Esmond Knight
- Cinematography: Basil Emmott
- Music by: Jack Beaver
- Production company: Warner Bros
- Distributed by: Warner Bros
- Release date: 15 March 1941 (United Kingdom)
- Running time: 69 minutes
- Country: United Kingdom
- Language: English
- Budget: £15,099
- Box office: £886

Fingers is a 1941 British second feature ('B') drama film directed by Herbert Mason and starring Clifford Evans, Leonora Corbett and Esmond Knight. It was written by Brock Williams and was produced by A.M.Salomon for Warner Bros.

== Plot ==
A London jeweller and fence for stolen goods falls in love and tries to reform.

== Cast ==
- Clifford Evans as Fingers
- Leonora Corbett as Bonita Grant
- Esmond Knight as Sid Harris
- Edward Rigby as Sam Bromley
- Elizabeth Scott as Meg
- Roland Culver as Hugo Allen
- Reginald Purdell as Creeper
- Joss Ambler as Inspector

== Reception ==
Kine Weekly wrote: "During the few halts in its extravagant perambulation it shows that crime does pay. Its confused morality robs it of conviction. But novelettish as it is, it has mass appeal Its versatile by-play, attractive cast and ambitious technical presentation effectively cloak its lurid fundamentals. Reliable quota booking for the masses."

Picturegoer wrote: "The novelettish plot is far-fetched and confused in thought, but there are some exciting and amusing incidents. Clifford Evans is suitably self-confident as the crooked hero, Fingers; Leonora Corbett has poise and polish as his high-society girl friend; and Elizabeth Scott is tender and appealing as his real sweetheart. Good supporting performances come from Edward Rigby, Roland Culver and Reginald Purdell."

Picture Show wrote: "Although on the slow side, this British crook melodrama is interesting and has plenty of thrills. ... There are plenty of contrasts between the East End and its pubs and the West End and its cocktail bars, and both are convincing. Clifford Evans gives a slick portrayal as the ambitious 'fence' who returns to his East End after a fling in a society atmosphere, and he is well supported, with Reginald Purdell and Edward Rigby outstanding."
