= The Dark Stairway =

1938 film by Arthur B. Woods

- Chili Bouchier and Hugh Williams in a scene from the film
- Directed by: Arthur B. Woods
- Written by: Basil Dillon; Brock Williams. Novel: From What Dark Stairway by Mignon G. Eberhart
- Produced by: Irving Asher
- Starring: Hugh Williams; Chili Bouchier
- Cinematography: Robert LaPresle
- Distributed by: Warner Brothers-First National Productions
- Release date: January 1938
- Running time: 73 minutes
- Country: United Kingdom
- Language: English

The Dark Stairway is a 1938 British crime film directed by Arthur B. Woods and starring Hugh Williams, Chili Bouchier and Garry Marsh. The film was a quota quickie production, written by Basil Dillon and Brock Williams based on the 1931 novel From This Dark Stairway by Mignon G. Eberhart.

== Preservation status ==
The British Film Institute has classed The Dark Stairway as a lost film. Its National Archive holds a collection of stills but no film or video materials.

== Plot summary ==
Professional jealousy and rivalry erupts in a hospital over the discovery of a revolutionary new formula for anaesthetic, leading to murder.

== Cast ==
- Hugh Williams as Dr. Thurlow
- Chili Bouchier as Betty Trimmer
- Garry Marsh as Dr. Mortimer
- Reginald Purdell as Askew
- Lesley Brook as Mary Cresswell
- Aubrey Pollock as Dr. Cresswell
- Glen Alyn as Isabel Simmonds
- John Carol as Merridew
- Robert Rendel as Dr. Fletcher

== Reception ==
The Monthly Film Bulletin wrote: "The setting is authentic, the plot well contrived and fast moving and the acting extremely good. It avoids being too complicated and the humour fits in with the whole. Chili Bouchier and Hugh Williams act realistically and James Stephenson makes an excellent inspector. The dialogue is crisp and natural and comedy, drama and suspense are all good of their kind."

The Daily Film Renter wrote: "There is not a great deal of conviction in the plot, while the continual perambulating of sundry characters becomes more than a little wearisome. The denouement packs a fair degree of surprise, although it is doubtful whether the average patron will care overmuch by the time the fadeout eventually materialises. Hugh Williams and Chili Bouchier sustain the juvenile leads smoothly, Reginald Purdell supplies alcoholic comedy, and James Stephenson is a singularly short-sighted Yard man. Patrons who do not mind leisurely development and a little unconscious humour may be able to accept this offering as a moderately entertaining 'meller.'"

Kine Weekly wrote: "Murder mystery drama manufactured from a tried and tested formula. Character, versatility, and ingenuity of direction and plot fall a little short of American standards, but in spite of occasional imperfections it should have no difficulty in registering with the industrial element. Paradoxically enough, humour, ably dispensed by Reginald Purdell as a drunk, loads the dice in its favour. Useful quota booking for most halls."

Picturegoer wrote: "Another spot-the-murderer story, this time with a hospital setting and a new anaesthetic as the motive for the crime. It is competently produced on completely conventional lines and relies more on its comedy than it does on its thrills. The action generally is fair, but the honours go to Reginald Purdell as an inebriated patient in the hospital. His performance helps to enlighten the heavy-handed treatment."
