= Patricia Gets Her Man =

- Cissy Fitzgerald, Edwin Styles, Lesley Brook and Hans Söhnker in the film
- Directed by: Reginald Purdell
- Written by: Maurice L. Kusell; Max Merritt
- Produced by: Irving Asher
- Starring: Hans Söhnker; Lesley Brook; Edwin Styles
- Cinematography: Basil Emmott
- Production company: Warner Brothers-First National Productions
- Distributed by: Warner Bros.
- Release date: March 1937
- Running time: 68 minutes
- Country: United Kingdom
- Language: English

Patricia Gets Her Man is a 1937 British romantic comedy film directed by Reginald Purdell and starring Hans Söhnker, Lesley Brook and Edwin Styles. It was written by Maurice L. Kusell and Max Merrit, based on their story "Love's Journey", and made at Teddington Studios as a quota quickie by Warner Brothers.

== Preservation status ==
The British Film Institute National Archive holds a collection of ephemera and stills but no film or video materials.

== Plot summary ==
In an effort to attract a film star a woman pays another man to pretend to be a suitor in order to provoke jealously in the star. However, she soon begins to fall in love with her hired partner.

== Cast ==
- Hans Söhnker as Count Stephan d'Orlet
- Lesley Brook as Patricia Fitzroy
- Edwin Styles as Brian Maxwell
- Aubrey Mallalieu as Colonel Fitzroy
- Cissy Fitzgerald as Duchess Banning
- Betty Lynne as Marie
- Yoshihide Yanai as Suki

== Reception ==
The Monthly Film Bulletin wrote: "The story is obviously not strong, and slow and uninspired direction does not help it. Some of the situations are amusing and the sequence showing the reactions of the hotel on the arrival of the film star is good. Lesley Brook plays Patricia naturally and attractively and the two men are convincing. The sets are palatial and the photography delightful."

Kine Weekly wrote: "The situations, character drawing, and dialogue are not without wit, and, given a stronger plot and slicker tempo, this might have developed into a really bright comedy. As it is – though inclined to be slow in development – it has its amusing moments."

The Daily Film Renter wrote: "It is all agreeably entertaining, even though the plot lacks body, and direction hardly inspired. ... Hans Sonker [sic] makes D'Orlet an engagingly impudent cavalier, his Gallic sense of humour being admirably suited to the role. Lesley Brook registers effectively as Patricia, although the part makes no great call on her histrionic reserves, and Edwin Styles puts over his celluloid Romeo with a fair amount of point. Aubrey Mallalieu is excellent as Patricia's matter-of-fact father."

Picturegoer wrote: "Poor story of a girl's efforts to attract the interest of a film star with whom she is infatuated. It is all very thin and lacking in real humour."

Picture Show wrote: "Lesley Brook is charming in the title role and is excellently supported by Hans Sonker [sic] as the gigolo who is really a count, Edwin Styles as the film star and Aubrey Mallalieu as the father. Well set and deftly directed."
