= Love on Wheels (1932 film) =

1932 film

- Title card
- Directed by: Victor Saville
- Written by: Ernst Angel; Franz Schulz; Angus MacPhail; Robert Stevenson; Victor Saville
- Produced by: Michael Balcon
- Starring: Jack Hulbert; Gordon Harker; Edmund Gwenn; Leonora Corbett
- Cinematography: Mutz Greenbaum
- Edited by: Ian Dalrymple
- Music by: Bretton Byrd
- Production company: Gainsborough Pictures
- Distributed by: Woolf & Freedman Film Service
- Release date: 1932
- Running time: 86 minutes
- Country: United Kingdom
- Language: English

Love on Wheels is a 1932 British musical comedy film directed by Victor Saville and starring Jack Hulbert, Gordon Harker, Edmund Gwenn and Leonora Corbett.

== Plot ==
A daily commuter on a Green Line bus from the suburbs to Central London Fred Hopkins romantically pursues a fellow passenger Jane with the help of Briggs the bus conductor. His hopes are thwarted when he is fired from his job at a major department store. However he is eventually able to return, securing both his dream job as advertising manager in charge of window dressing and the girl he loves.

== Cast ==
- Jack Hulbert as Fred Hopkins
- Leonora Corbett as Jane Russell
- Gordon Harker as Briggs
- Edmund Gwenn as Philpotts
- Tony De Lungo as Bronelli
- Percy Parsons as American Crook
- Roland Culver as Salesman
- Miles Malleson as Academy of Music Porter
- Martita Hunt as Piano Demonstrator
- Maria Milza as Mrs Bronelli

== Production ==
The film was made at the Islington Studios of Gainsborough Pictures. Gainsborough was part of the larger Gaumont British empire, and specialised in making comedies during the 1930s. Hulbert became one of the studio's top stars during the early 1930s, often appearing with his wife Cicely Courtneidge.

== Critical reception ==
BFI Screenonline called the film a "sublime musical comedy." and British Pictures called it "one of those charmingly amateurish British musicals the 30s produced so well. It proclaims: we may not have dancers like Fred and Ginger, or songwriters like Gershwin or Berlin, or directors like Busby Berkeley, but when it comes to endearing silliness we're world class...Love on Wheels is never going to make the critics Top 100 list, it certainly leaves a smile on your face."
