= A Bride for Henry =

1937 film by William Nigh

- Directed by: William Nigh
- Screenplay by: Marion Orth
- Story by: Josephine Bentham
- Produced by: Dorothy Davenport
- Starring: See below
- Cinematography: Gilbert Warrenton
- Edited by: Russell F. Schoengarth
- Production company: Monogram Pictures
- Distributed by: Monogram Pictures
- Release date: 29 September 1937
- Running time: 58 minutes
- Country: United States
- Language: English

A Bride for Henry is a 1937 American romantic drama film directed by William Nigh based on the Josephine Bentham short story of the same name that was published in Liberty magazine. Authors such as James Cox and Kylo-Patrick Hart have cited A Bride for Henry as within a subgenre of screwball comedies termed "sentimental comedy", where plots deal with domestic struggles but avoid true threats of adultery and ultimately defend marriage. The formation of the Production Code Administration (PCA) hastened the production of sentimental comedies; others include Maybe It's Love (1935), Three Married Men (1936), and Wife, Doctor and Nurse (1937).

== Plot ==
Sheila Curtis's (Anne Nagel) fiancé Eric Reynolds (Henry Mollison) fails to appear for the wedding, so Sheila drafts her lawyer, Henry Tuttle (Warren Hull), to stand in for the missing groom. When Eric finally shows up after sleeping off the bachelor party, Shelia intends to get a quick divorce and marry him after the media attention dies down. Although Henry has been in love with her for years, he gets fed up and spends his time on their honeymoon with his old girlfriend, wealthy Helen Van Orden (Claudia Dell), and a bevy of beauties. Shelia soon gets jealous, and realizes that Eric will always be unreliable while it's Henry she's always counted on and loved, but it might be too late. She realizes she may have taken Henry for granted.

== Cast ==
- Anne Nagel as Sheila Curtis
- Warren Hull as Henry Tuttle
- Henry Mollison as Eric Reynolds
- Claudia Dell as Helen Van Orden
- Betty Ross Clarke as Mrs. Curtis
- Harrison Greene as Constable

== Release ==
In September 2018, the film was available and streaming on "Moonlight Movies" channel. The film is also currently available on Tubi and several YouTube accounts.
