= The Price of Folly =

1937 film directed by Walter Summers

- Opening titles
- Directed by: Walter Summers
- Written by: J. Lee Thompson (play); Ruth Landa; Walter Summers
- Produced by: Walter Summers
- Starring: Leonora Corbett; Colin Keith-Johnston; Judy Kelly
- Cinematography: Bryan Langley
- Edited by: Lionel Tomlinson
- Production company: Welwyn Studios
- Distributed by: Pathé Pictures
- Release date: 26 February 1937
- Running time: 51 minutes
- Country: United Kingdom
- Language: English

The Price of Folly (also known as Double Error) is a 1937 British drama film directed by Walter Summers and starring Leonora Corbett, Colin Keith-Johnston and Judy Kelly. It was written byRuth Landa and Summers based on the 1934 play Double Error by J. Lee Thompson. The screenplay concerns a man who, after a failed attempt to kill a woman, finds himself blackmailed over the incident.

The film was produced and distributed by the large ABPC combine for whom Thompson later became an established director. It was shot at Welwyn Studioswith sets designed by the art director Cedric Dawe.

== Plot ==
Martin is a philandering lawyer, whose wife Christine has left him. When he is about to go away with his latest conquest Frances, Christine decides to go back to him. Frances objects, and is accidentally shot. Thinking she is dead, Martin hides her body in a trunk. When Owen, who also admires Frances, discovers she is only slightly wounded, he blackmails Martin. Martin kills Owen, but discovers he has been the victim of a hoax.

== Cast ==
- Leonora Corbett as Christine
- Colin Keith-Johnston as Martin
- Judy Kelly as Frances
- Andreas Malandrinos as Gomez
- Leslie Perrins as Owen
- Wally Patch as man with tip
- The Trocadero Girls as dancers

== Reception ==
The Monthly Film Bulletin wrote: "This amazingly crude story is not helped by the direction or the acting. The situations are banal to a degree and the dialogue inept and lifeless. Colin Keith-Johnson overacts so extravagantly as to become a ludicrous instead of a tragic figure. Leonora Corbett looks charming, but is helpless in the circumstances. Neither lighting nor photography is up to standard."

Kine Weekly wrote: "A modest study in the macabre, this crime drama has an ingenious central theme, but unfortunately the character upon which it turns is far from convincingly played. Colin Keith-Johnson so overacts in the lead as to discount story invention entirely. ... His eagerness is his undoing; he attempts too much and finishes up by achieving next to nothing."
