= David Whitelaw =

British illustrator, editor, journalist and author (1875–1970)

David Whitelaw in 1925

A David Whitelaw edition of The Thriller, 1933

The Premier Magazine

David Whitelaw (1875–1970) was an English writer, editor and illustrator.

== Life and work ==
David Whitelaw was born in Holloway, Islington, then still in Middlesex, to David Whitelaw and Hannah Baxter. Both of his parents died during his infancy and he and his elder brother Stephen (1873–1936) were raised by their grandparents, Theodore and Eliza Baxter, members of the North London branch of the Sandemanian church.

After brief spells in New York City and Paris in the 1890s, Whitelaw returned to London to work for various Fleet Street newspapers as an illustrator and journalist, later becoming editor of The London Magazine and The Premier Magazine. The Premier Magazine, published by the Amalgamated Press, (based at Fleetway House in Farringdon, London) ran between 1914 and 1931 and published atmospheric adventure and mystery fiction including authors such as Edgar Wallace, Sax Rohmer, Rose Champion de Crespigny and Achmed Abdullah.

His first novel, M'Stodger's Affinity, was published in 1896 and this was followed by a steady output of romantic thrillers. He had over 50 novels published during his lifetime and his stories were also serialised in the Amalgamated Press published The Thriller magazine. Many of his works went through multiple publication runs and translation into numerous languages. He also wrote several plays for stage and television.

In 1932 he invented the spelling card game Lexicon, which won worldwide popularity. In his 1944 book The Lexicon Murders the killer uses the card game for the purpose of a secret code. Lexicon has been translated into many languages and Braille. It is still in production today.

He was for many years a member, and later chair of, the Savage Club.

== Published work ==
Books by David Whitelaw include:

Fiction:

- Prince Charles Edward and the '45 (1890)
- M'Stodger's Affinity (1896)
- The Gang (1909)
- The Princess Galva (1911)
- The Man with the Red Beard (1911)
- The Secret of Chauville (1911)
- The Girl From the East (1919)
- The Little Hour of Peter Wells (1913)
- A Castle in Bohemia (1914)
- The Imposter (1915)
- The Mystery of Enid Bellairs (1915)
- A Flutter in Kings (1916)
- The Madgwick Affair (1918)
- The Master of Merlains (1918)
- The Valley of Bells. A Romance (1918)
- The Man on the Dover Road (1919)
- Pirates' Gold (1920)
- The Lady of Arrock (1921)
- The Stones of Khor (1924)
- For Conduct Unbefitting (1925)
- A Hair of the Dog (1925)
- The Island of Romance (1926)
- The Villa Petroff (1926)
- Madcap Betty (1927)
- The Man From Mexico City (1927)
- Black Out (1928)
- Mystery at Furze Acres (1929)
- Number Fifteen (1931)
- Spanish Heels (1932)
- The Roof (1933)
- Murder Calling (1934)
- Hotel Sinister (1935)
- Murder in Motley (1935)
- The Big Picture (1936)
- Wolf's Crag: The Little Hour of Peter Wolf, Junior (1936)
- The Face (1937)
- The Feud (1937)
- Horror on the Loch (1938)
- Blackmail De Luxe (1939)
- Frame-Up (1939)
- Girl Friday (1940)
- The Jackal (1940)
- Horace Steps Out (1941)
- Black-Out Murder (1943)
- The Lexicon Murders (1944)
- The Ryecroft Verdict (1946)
- Lovers in Waiting (1947)
- Garments of Repentance (1948)
- The Moor (1949)
- The House in Cavendish Square (1950)
- The Yellow Door (1951)
- Presumed Dead (1952)
- Murder Besieged (1953)
- Legacy in Green (1954)
- Presumed Dead (1955)
- I Could A Tale Unfold (1957)

Non Fiction:

- Corpus Delicti (1936)
- A Bonfire of Leaves (autobiography - 1937)
