= Quiet Please (Big City Greens) =

2020 episode of Big City Greens

- Big City Greens segment
- Episode no.: Season 2 Episode 20a
- Directed by: Monica Ray
- Written by: Kiana Khansmith and Caldwell Tanner
- Story by: Kenny Byerly
- Production code: 220a
- Original release date: September 19, 2020
- Running time: 11 minutes

Episode chronology
← Previous "Hurt Bike"	Next → "Chipwrecked"
- Big City Greens season 2

"Quiet Please" is the first segment of the twentieth episode of the second season of Big City Greens, and the 96th segment of the series overall. It originally aired on Disney Channel on September 19, 2020. The episode follows the Greens going to the library to help Cricket find a book to read, but are very strictly forced to stay 100% quiet by an eerie librarian.

External videos
- Big City Greens Full Episode | Quiet Please / Chipwrecked | S2 E20 | @disneychannelanimation — Official upload of the episode onto YouTube

== Plot ==
Cricket watches television while Tilly reads a book. When Bill notices Cricket's lack of interest in reading, he encourages him to put down the television and try a book instead. Although Cricket doubts that reading can keep him entertained, Gramma Alice and Tilly convince him to give it a chance. The family visits the Big City Library, where Bill warns Cricket about the strict rules regarding noise. After Cricket struggles to remain quiet, they encounter the intimidating head librarian, who threatens to permanently ban them if they make any noise. Tilly suggests communicating through sign language, although the rest of the family struggle to use it properly.

Tilly and Alice gather books from their favorite genres for Cricket to explore, but he finds both murder mysteries and fantasy novels uninteresting. After Cricket accidentally disrupts another patron and gets kicked out, Bill realizes they have not found the right reading material for him. He takes Cricket upstairs to introduce him to the Lil' Abe books, but Cricket still struggles to concentrate. Meanwhile, his repeated missteps with a dropped Blego brick cause further disturbances, attracting the librarian's attention. Alice manages to distract the librarian by interfering with her hearing aid, allowing Cricket to escape.

After admitting that he cannot find a book that interests him, Cricket prepares to leave with Bill and Tilly. However, he discovers a graphic novel titled Bear Cowboy and immediately becomes absorbed in it. His excitement makes it difficult for him to remain quiet, eventually attracting the attention of the librarians. When Bill realizes Cricket is in danger of being caught, he deliberately makes a loud noise to distract them, allowing Cricket to escape but resulting in Bill being banned from libraries worldwide. Cricket, Tilly, and Alice celebrate his discovery of a book he enjoys, while taking advantage of their newfound freedom to make as much noise as they want. The episode concludes by revealing that the events were being narrated by the head librarian, who promptly shushes the audience.

== Voice cast ==
- Chris Houghton as Cricket Green, Filthy Rich and Hungry Announcer
- Marieve Herington as Tilly Green, Sneezing Boy, TV Woman
- Bob Joles as Bill Green, Fantasy Sailor
- Artemis Pebdani as Alice Green
- Linda Hamilton as The Librarian

== Production ==
"Quiet Please" was directed by Monica Ray, written and storyboarded by Kiana Khansmith and Caldwell Tanner with a story written by Kenny Byerly. Byerly wanted to do an episode with minimal dialogue. The episode pays homage to the 2018 film A Quiet Place. Linda Hamilton guest stars as the librarian.

== Reception ==
"Quiet Please" was watched by 531,000 viewers on the day of its premiere. The episode is notable for its inclusion of American Sign Language (ASL) and its authentic deaf representation. Bubbleblabber's Marley Crusch rated "Quiet Please" an 8.5/10, writing that the episode is an example of the show's ability to "pull from pop culture without simply rehashing it".
