= John Dighton =

British playwright and screenwriter (1909–1989)

John Gervase Dighton (8 December 1909 – 16 April 1989) was a British playwright and screenwriter.

Dighton was born in London to Basil Lewis Dighton, of West Kensington, an antiques dealer, author and poet, and his wife Beatrice Mary (née Franks). He was educated at Charterhouse School and Caius College, Cambridge.

His output during the 1940s included the last starring features of comedian Will Hay, and several George Formby films as well as the 1947 adaptation of Charles Dickens' Nicholas Nickleby, and the 1943 war movie Undercover starring John Clements and Michael Wilding.

In 1947, Dighton wrote his first play for the theatre, The Happiest Days of Your Life, which ran in the West End for more than 600 performances in 1948 and 1949. For Ealing Studios, he collaborated on the screenplays of such comedies as Kind Hearts and Coronets (1949) and The Man in the White Suit (1952), sharing an Academy Award nomination for the latter. He gained a second nomination for the American-financed Roman Holiday (1953).

Two of his stage plays, The Happiest Days of Your Life and Who Goes There! (known as The Passionate Sentry in the USA), were successfully adapted for the screen by Dighton himself, the former in collaboration with Frank Launder. He also wrote the 1955 comedy play Man Alive! that transferred to the West End the following year with Robertson Hare in the lead. He adapted the play Summer of the Seventeenth Doll.

His final screen credit was his adaptation of Shaw's The Devil's Disciple, written in collaboration with Roland Kibbee.

Dighton married Kathleen Marie Philipps in 1934.

== Partial filmography as screenwriter ==
- Hail and Farewell (1936)
- The Vulture (1937)
- Ship's Concert (1937)
- Thank Evans (1938)
- It's in the Blood (1938)
- The Viper (1938)
- Many Tanks Mr. Atkins (1938)
- Everything Happens to Me (1938)
- The Good Old Days (lost, 1939)
- Sailors Three (1940)
- Let George Do It! (1940)
- Saloon Bar (1940)
- Hoots Mon! (1940)
- That's the Ticket (1940)
- The Ghost of St. Michael's (1941)
- Turned Out Nice Again (1941)
- The Black Sheep of Whitehall (1942)
- Went the Day Well? (1942)
- The Goose Steps Out (1942)
- The Foreman Went to France (1942)
- The Next of Kin (1942)
- Undercover (1943)
- My Learned Friend (1943)
- Champagne Charlie (1944)
- Nicholas Nickleby (1947)
- Saraband for Dead Lovers (1948)
- Kind Hearts and Coronets (1949)
- The Happiest Days of Your Life (based on his play, 1950)
- The Man in the White Suit (1951)
- Who Goes There! (based on his play The Passionate Sentry, 1952)
- Brandy for the Parson (1952)
- Folly to Be Wise (1953)
- Roman Holiday (1953)
- The Story of William Tell (unfinished, 1953)
- The Swan (1956)
- The Barretts of Wimpole Street (1957)
- Summer of the Seventeenth Doll (1959)
- The Devil's Disciple (1959)

== Selected plays ==
- Who Goes There! (1950)
- Man Alive! (1955)

== Sources ==
- Gaye, Freda, ed. (1967). Who's Who in the Theatre (fourteenth ed.). London: Sir Isaac Pitman and Sons. OCLC 5997224.
