= Quiet Please (1938 film) =

1938 British film by R. William Neill

- Reginald Purdell (left) and Wally Patch (right) in the film
- Directed by: R. William Neill
- Written by: Reginald Purdell; Anthony Hankey
- Produced by: Irving Asher
- Starring: Reginald Purdell; Wally Patch; Lesley Brook
- Cinematography: Basil Emmott
- Production company: Warner Brothers-First National Pictures
- Distributed by: First National
- Release date: 1938
- Running time: 68 minutes
- Country: United Kingdom
- Language: English

Quiet Please is a lost 1938 British comedy film directed by R. William Neill and starring Reginald Purdell, Wally Patch and Lesley Brook. It was written by Purdell and Anthony Hankey, and produced as a quota quickie by Warner Brothers-First National.

== Preservation status ==
The British Film Institute has classed Quiet Please as a lost film. Its National Archive holds a collection of ephemera and stills but no film or video materials.

== Plot ==
Algernon Beresford is a theatre queue entertainer who is persuaded by a villain, Holloway, to pose as a wealthy resident of a rest home, telling him that it is cover for an "investigation". It turns out to be a jewel robbery. When Beresford realises, he and his busker friend Big Bill set out to recover the stolen goods and bring Holloway to justice.

== Cast ==
Sourced from and.

- Reginald Purdell as Algernon Beresford
- Wally Patch as Big Bill
- Lesley Brook Margery Meadows
- Julien Mitchell as Holloway
- Ian McLean as Woods
- Winifred Izard as Lady Winterley
- Ian Fleming as Dr Craven
- Bruce Lester as Dr Faversham
- Clem Lawrence as Johnson
- Brenda Harvey as Tyler
- Bobby Lawrence as Edgar

== Reception ==
The Monthly Film Bulletin wrote: "The film is too long for the simple plot. Despite Reginald Purdell's efforts, Algy is a boring little man too fond of his own voice. The element of farce prevents us from being really interested in the climax. Only moderately amusing."

Kine Weekly wrote: "Comedy crime story, in which the humour takes precedence of the plot. With the presence of Reginald Pardell as comedian-in-chief the production is engaging from the start. ... Although a good comedy idea declines into slapstick at the end the picture will assuredly attract on its histrionic merits. This is a British production which will occasion much laughter, both for situation and interpretation."

The Daily Film Renter wrote: "Told with amusing incident of robust and hearty character, which, with sound stellar portrayal, and sequence of complications, make this pleasant, light popular entertainment. The story is an ideal vehicle for Reginald Purdell to display his versatility, and put over his inimitable style of patter, and he plays the varied roles of busker, wealthy gentleman, solicitor and housemaid with real gusto. He is aided and abetted by Wally Patch, who also adopts various disguises in his efforts to help his gutter pal. The very slight romantic interest is provided by Lesley Brook as the secretary, and Bruce Lister as a doctor at the rest home, There is quite a good quota of amusing incidents throughout the film, while the many complicated tangles in which the central characters find themselves are of the reliable pattern."

Picturegoer wrote: "Reginald Purdell scores in this impersonation comedy, which develops into somewhat wild slapstick. ... The whole thing is very extravagant, but it scores laughs by its hearty ingenuousness. Wally Patch is good as the busker's friend, who has to impersonate first an old lady from Lancashire and secondly a specialist from Vienna. There is a sound surprise element and a touch of mystery for good measure."

Picture Show wrote: "The film has a tremendous filip given it in the shape of Reginald Purdell and Wally Patch, who are grand as the two buskers – with Reginald Purdell winning honours for his comedy performance. It is competently supported and directed."
