= Reginald Purdell =

English actor and screenwriter (1896–1953)

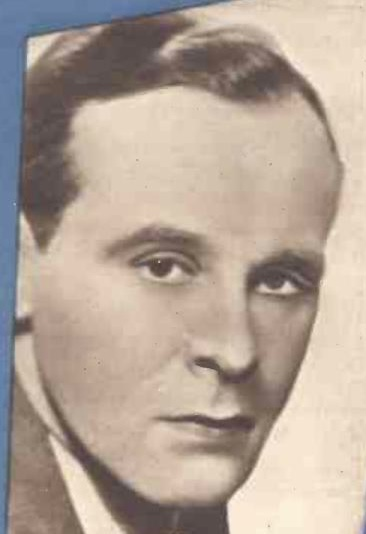
- Purdell in 1935
- Born: Reginald William Henry Grasdorff; 4 November 1896; Clapham, London, England, UK
- Died: 22 April 1953 (aged 56); Kensington, London, England, UK
- Occupations: Actor, screenwriter, film director
- Years active: 1930 – 1952

Reginald Purdell (4 November 1896 – 22 April 1953) was an English actor and screenwriter who appeared in over 40 films between 1930 and 1951. During the same period, he also contributed to the screenplays of 15 feature films, such as The Dark Tower, and had a brief foray into directing with two films in 1937.

== Early life ==
Purdell was born in Clapham, London, the son of Charles William Grasdorff by his marriage to Mary Ann Piddill. At the 1881 census, a few weeks after the marriage, the couple were living in Monmouthshire, and his father stated his name as Carl H. W. Grasdorff, giving his place of birth as Germany, about 1844, while his mother gave hers as Cardiff, about 1857. Grasdorff was naturalized as a British subject under the name of Carl Hermann Wilhelm Grasdorff. Mary Ann Grasdorff's maiden name of Piddill, suitably improved, later provided their son's stage name.

In 1892, Grasdorff was listed as "Grasdorff, Carl H. W., Newport, Monmouthshire, and Bute Docks, Cardiff, Sailing and Steamship Broker, Coal Exporter, and Managing Steamship Owner".

Both parents were living in Clapham in 1901.

== Career ==
As a young man, under the name of Reginald Grasdorff, he served in the British Army with the South Wales Borderers regiment for the duration of the First World War. On returning to civilian life after the war, he decided to try his luck as an actor under the name of Purdell and gained experience on the stage through the 1920s. His move into films in 1930 coincided with the advent of the talkie era in British cinema.

Purdell's first screen appearance was in the 1930 comedy The Middle Watch, in a role he would later reprise in a 1940 remake. He next travelled to Germany to feature in historical drama Congress Dances, an ambitious and lavishly budgeted project by the UFA film company, involving the simultaneous filming of three versions of the same story in German, English and French in an attempt to prove that a European company could challenge the dominance of American studios in the new era of sound by delivering a continent-wide hit.

Purdell soon began to accumulate screen credits in a wide variety of films ranging from cheaply made quota quickies to more sophisticated productions. He showed a knack for playing comedy, and his 1930s films fell mainly into this genre, with occasional ventures into straight drama and thrillers. Purdell's screenwriting career began in 1932 and he was most productive in this field during the late 1930s, with only occasional ventures later in his career. He tried his hand at film directing in 1937 with two comedies Don't Get Me Wrong, a Max Miller vehicle co-directed with Arthur B. Woods, and Patricia Gets Her Man. Both films were reasonably well-received, but Purdell appears to have decided that directing was not for him, as there would be no more ventures in this area.

In the 1940s Purdell's acting career diversified, with fewer throwaway comedies and more appearances in high-quality dramatic vehicles. His credits included war dramas We Dive at Dawn and Two Thousand Women, Gainsborough melodrama Love Story, the notorious box-office flop musical London Town and the classic Brighton Rock. Purdell's last screen appearance was in 1951.

== Personal life ==
In the summer of 1928, under his real name of Reginald William Henry Grasdorff, Purdell married May Watson at Wandsworth. They had a son in 1932, born in Kensington and registered under the name of John R. W. Grasdorff.

Purdell died on 22 April 1953, at Kensington, London. His death was registered under the name of Reginald Purdell and his age stated as 57.

== Partial filmography ==
- The Middle Watch (1930) - Cpl. Duckett
- A Night in Montmartre (1931) - Tino
- A Night Like This (1932) - Waiter (uncredited)
- Congress Dances (1932) - Pepi
- My Lucky Star (1933) - Artist
- Crime on the Hill (1933) - Reporter
- Up to the Neck (1933) - Jimmy Catlin
- Three Men in a Boat (1933)
- On the Air (1934) - Reggie
- The Queen's Affair (1934) - Soldier
- The Luck of a Sailor (1934) - Jenkins
- What's in a Name? (1934) - Harry Stubbs
- The Old Curiosity Shop (1934) - Dick Swiveller
- Key to Harmony (1935) - Tom Kirkwood
- Royal Cavalcade (1935) - Radio Listener
- Get Off My Foot (1935) - Joe
- Debt of Honour (1936) - Pedro Salvas
- Where's Sally? (1936) - Dick Burgess
- Crown v. Stevens (1936) - Alf
- Hail and Farewell (1936) - Nobby
- Side Street Angel (1937) - McGill
- Ship's Concert (1937, Short) - Reggie
- The Dark Stairway (1938) - Askew
- Quiet Please (1938) - Algy Beresford
- The Viper (1938) - Announcer
- Simply Terrific (1938) - Sam Todd
- Many Tanks Mr. Atkins (1938) - Pvt. Nuts Nutter
- It's in the Blood (1938)
- Q Planes (1939) - Pilot (uncredited)
- His Brother's Keeper (1940) - Bunny Reeves
- Pack Up Your Troubles (1940) - Tommy Perkins
- The Middle Watch (1940) - Cpl Duckett
- Busman's Honeymoon (1940) - MacBride
- Fingers (1941) - Creeper
- We Dive at Dawn (1943) - Coxwain - C / P.O. Dabbs
- Variety Jubilee (1943) - Joe Swan
- It's in the Bag (1944) - Joe
- Bell-Bottom George (1944) - Birdie Edwards
- Love Story (1944) - Albert
- Two Thousand Women (1944) - Alec Harvey
- Candles at Nine (1944) - Charles Lacey
- Dreaming (1944)
- London Town (1946) - Stage Manager
- The Root of All Evil (1947) - Perkins
- Holiday Camp (1947) - Redcoat
- Captain Boycott (1947) - American reporter
- A Man About the House (1947) - Higgs
- Brighton Rock (1948) - Frank
- Stage Fright (1950) - Police Car Driver (uncredited)
- Files from Scotland Yard (1951) - Inspector Gower
