= Glen Alyn =

Australian actress (1913–1984)

- Born: Glenore Jean Pointing; 30 September 1913; Sydney, Australia
- Died: 6 October 1984 (aged 71); Sydney, Australia
- Occupation: Actress
- Years active: 1931–1957 (film)

Glenore Jean Pointing (1913–1984), known professionally as Glen Alyn, was an Australian actress who appeared in British films from the 1930s until 1957. Originally a dancer in West End revue, she made her film debut in The Outsider (1931) under her real name, Glenore Pointing. A Warner Brothers contract and numerous films followed, as well as occasional stage work.

== Selected filmography ==
- Head of the Family (1933)
- Mayfair Girl (1933)
- Head of the Family (1933)
- Don't Get Me Wrong (1937)
- Mayfair Melody (1937)
- Ship's Concert (1937)
- Simply Terrific (1938)
- Thank Evans (1938)
- Sweet Devil (1938)
- It's in the Blood (1938)
- The Ware Case (1938)
- Old Mother Riley Joins Up (1940)
- A Window in London (1940)
- Law and Disorder (1940)
- Another Shore (1948)
- Maytime in Mayfair (1949)
- There's Always a Thursday (1957)

== Bibliography ==
- Goble, Alan. The Complete Index to Literary Sources in Film. Walter de Gruyter, 1999.
