= 1937 in British music =

This is a summary of 1937 in music in the United Kingdom.

== Events ==
- 24 January – Ernest John Moeran completes the revised version of his Symphony in G minor, dedicated to conductor Hamilton Harty.
- 6 March – Composer Benjamin Britten and his partner, the tenor Peter Pears, meet for the first time, in London.
- 12 May – William Walton's ceremonial march, "Crown Imperial", originally written for his predecessor, King Edward VIII, is performed for the first time at the coronation of King George VI and Queen Elizabeth.
- 27 August – Britten's Variations on a Theme of Frank Bridge is performed at the Salzburg Festival, conducted by Boyd Neel.
- 20 December – The Gaumont State Cinema opens in London with Sidney Torch as organist.
- date unknown
  - Kathleen Ferrier wins the piano and vocal competitions at the Carlisle Festival, and is awarded a special rose bowl as champion of the festival.
  - George Lloyd marries Nancy Juvet. Lloyd has PTSD and later acknowledges that he could not have recovered without Nancy's care.
  - Ukrainian-born pianist Benno Moiseiwitsch takes up British citizenship.

== Popular music ==
- "A Nice Cup of Tea" Gracie Fields w. m. A. P. Herbert, Henry Sullivan
- "Did Your Mother Come From Ireland?" w.m. Jimmy Kennedy & Michael Carr
- "Harbour Lights" w. Jimmy Kennedy m. Hugh Williams
- "Home Town" w.m. Jimmy Kennedy & Michael Carr
- "The Lambeth Walk" w. Douglas Furber, L. Arthur Rose m. Noel Gay
- "Leaning on a Lamp-post" w.m. Noel Gay
- "Me And My Girl" w.m. Noel Gay & Douglas Furber

== Classical music: new works ==
- Arthur Bliss – Checkmate (ballet)
- Rutland Boughton – Symphony No. 3 in B minor
- Frank Bridge String Quartet No. 4
- Benjamin Britten – Variations on a Theme of Frank Bridge
- George Dyson – Symphony in G major
- John Ireland – These Things Shall Be
- Edmund Rubbra – Symphony No. 1
- Ralph Vaughan Williams – Job: A Masque for Dancing (ballet)
- Percy Whitlock – Wessex Suite

== Film and Incidental music ==
- Richard Addinsell – Fire Over England, starring Laurence Olivier and Vivien Leigh.
- Ernest Irving – Feather Your Nest, starring George Formby, Polly Ward and Enid Stamp-Taylor.

== Musical theatre ==
- 5 February – On Your Toes London production opened at the Palace Theatre and ran for 123 performances
- 29 March – Swing is in the Air London revue opened at the Palladium
- 16 December – Me and My Girl (Noel Gay) – London production opened at the Victoria Palace Theatre and ran for 1646 performances.

== Musical films ==
- Big Fella, directed by J. Elder Wills, starring Paul Robeson and Elisabeth Welch
- Calling All Stars, directed by Herbert Smith, starring Carroll Gibbons and Evelyn Dall
- Gangway, starring Jessie Matthews and Alastair Sim
- Head Over Heels, starring Jessie Matthews
- Mayfair Melody, directed by Arthur B. Woods, starring Keith Falkner and Chili Bouchier
- The Show Goes On, starring Gracie Fields, Owen Nares and John Stuart.
- Song of the Forge, starring Stanley Holloway.
- The Street Singer, starring Arthur Tracy, Margaret Lockwood and Arthur Riscoe
- Take My Tip, directed by Herbert Mason, starring Jack Hulbert and Cicely Courtneidge

== Births ==
- 8 January – Shirley Bassey, singer
- 22 January – Ryan Davies, comedian, singer and songwriter (died 1977)
- 27 January – John Ogdon, pianist (died 1989)
- 28 April – Jean Redpath, folk singer (died 2014)
- 5 May – Delia Derbyshire, musician and composer of electronic music (died 2001)
- 21 May – John Barstow, pianist and teacher
- 12 July – Guy Woolfenden, conductor and theatre composer (died 2016)
- 27 July – Anna Dawson, actress and singer
- 19 November – Geoff Goddard, songwriter, singer and instrumentalist (died 2000)
- 30 November – Frank Ifield, British-born Australian singer
- 1 December
  - Gordon Crosse, composer
  - David Measham, violinist and conductor (died 2005)
- 12 December – Philip Ledger, composer and teacher (died 2012)
- 31 December – Anthony Hopkins, actor and composer

== Deaths ==
- 22 January – Walter Willson Cobbett, businessman and amateur violinist, editor/author of Cobbett's Cyclopedic Survey of Chamber Music, 89
- 10 April – Algernon Ashton, pianist and composer, 77
- 1 May – Herbert Hughes, composer, music critic and collector of folk songs, 54
- 2 May – Sir Arthur Somervell, composer, 73
- 23 July – Charles Henry Mills, composer and music teacher (b. 1873)
- 25 November – Lilian Baylis, founder of Sadler's Wells ballet company, 63 (heart attack)
- 23 December – Muriel Foster, contralto, 60
- 26 December
  - Dan Beddoe, tenor, 74
  - Ivor Gurney, composer and poet, 47 (tuberculosis)

== See also ==
- 1937 in British television
- 1937 in the United Kingdom
- List of British films of 1937
