= Keith Falkner =

English bass-baritone singer (1900–1994)

Sir Donald Keith Falkner (1 March 1900 – 17 May 1994), known simply as Keith Falkner, was a distinguished English bass-baritone singer especially associated with oratorio and concert recital, who later became Director of the Royal College of Music in London.

== Early years ==
Falkner was born at Sawston, Cambridgeshire. At the age of nine he won a place in the choir of New College, Oxford, in which there were 18 boys, two altos, four tenors and four basses, under the direction of Dr Hugh Allen. During his years as a chorister the choir sang almost all the repertoire of Johann Sebastian Bach's choral music, including particularly the motets, and also much other Elizabethan and more modern church music, and works by Palestrina, Schütz and Handel. These were usually performed with minimal rehearsal or at sight. In this period Hugh Allen laid the foundation of Falkner's technique, his breathing, intonation and phrasing.

During the early part of World War I he was a schoolboy at The Perse School, Cambridge, but in 1917–19 he was a pilot in the Royal Naval Air Service, working in hazardous early aircraft spotting submarines in the English Channel.

== Adult training ==
Late in 1919 he gained the recommendation of Sir Hugh Allen (by then Director of the Royal College of Music) for an ex-serviceman's grant to enable him to study singing at the college. For five years he studied there with Albert Garcia, taking organ as his second subject. In 1920 he accepted the post as an assistant vicar-choral at St Paul's Cathedral, which helped to support his continued studies and gave him a start as a professional singer until 1926. At St Paul's, the cavernous acoustic caused his voice to develop a 'lugubrious quality'. He took part in a number of public performances during the early 1920s, but did not begin to make a permanent impression until he sang in Hubert Parry's oratorio Job, the role including the great dramatic passage of the Lamentations, at the Three Choirs Festival at Gloucester in 1925.

The role of Job became one of the pinnacles of his art, and he attributed his success in it to the coaching he received from Harry Plunket Greene, whose pupil he became to lighten his tone after his term at St Paul's. Plunket Greene was an inspiration to him for his unique interpretative powers, and made Falkner into one of the finest English singers of his day. Falkner stated, 'Greene's recitals still remain in my mind, they were a highlight of my musical experience.'

He attributed a lesser influence to lessons which he received intermittently as a very young man at Vienna and Salzburg from Theodore Lierhammer, from Ernst Grenzebach in Berlin, and from Dossert in Paris. He said that he went to Germany 'to sing himself into the German idiom.'

== Early professional career ==
In 1925 he made his debut at the Promenade Concerts at Queen's Hall, London, under Henry J. Wood, where he often sang thereafter. Falkner considered that his career 'owed much' to Henry Wood. In 1927 he made the first of his annual appearances in the Bach St Matthew Passion with the Bach Choir, and thereafter was regularly engaged for most of the English festivals, including the Leeds Triennial Festival. In April 1929 he first contributed to a Royal Philharmonic Society concert, singing Bach's aria Thou most blessed under Henry Wood. His second was in November 1933, for Thomas Beecham, in Dvořák's Stabat Mater with Dora Labbette, Heddle Nash and Edith Furmedge.

In December 1936 he sang with Olga Haley and Parry Jones in the RPS performance of Berlioz's Roméo et Juliette under Albert Wolff. His appearance as Hercules in Handel's music drama, opposite Isobel Baillie, at the 1936 Norwich Festival was much admired. In this period he made recordings for His Master's Voice, including the successful Bach record of How Jovial is my Laughter (Secular Cantata 5, No. 3, Wie will'ich lustig lachen) and Twas in the cool of eventide (St Matthew Passion, No. 74, Am Abend, da es kühle war). After singing Mendelssohn's St Paul at Ashford he made a famous recording of the aria O God, have mercy; he also recorded Kodály songs, and Purcell songs (for the Purcell Society) with harpsichord and cello (Brand Richards and John Ticehurst).

== In the United States: 1930s ==
Falkner was married in 1930, to Christabel Fullard, a concert pianist, and had two daughters. Christabel was Falkner's accompanist for many of his recitals. Falkner increasingly won success in the United States during the 1930s. In particular he triumphed at the Cincinnati May Festivals in 1935, 1937 and 1939, and throughout that decade, from 1932 to 1939, he gave annual performances with the Boston Symphony Orchestra under Serge Koussevitzky. Although oratorio remained his primary interest, especially Parry's Job and the St Matthew Passion, his recitals also reflected his strong interests in folksong, in English Tudor music, in modern English song, and in the songs of Brahms and Schumann.

== Film career ==
It is not widely noticed that Falkner had a brief film career in 1937 and 1938, leading the cast in three films directed by Arthur B. Woods. These were Warner Bros./First National productions using Teddington Studios facilities: the stories were scripted by James Dyrenforth and Kenneth Leslie-Smith. The first was Mayfair Melody (1937), in the character of Mark, with Joyce Kirby and Chili Bouchier. The second was a spy film, The Singing Cop (1938), playing Jack Richards, with Ivy St. Helier (in her first film since Noël Coward's Bitter Sweet in 1933), which included opera scenes directed by Percy Heming under the general musical direction of Benjamin Frankel. The third was the film Thistledown (1938), playing Sir Ian Glenloch opposite Aino Bergö and Athole Stewart, in a dramatis personae which included the character of Gioachino Rossini. All three of these film musicals are thought to be lost.

== Post-war career ==
From 1940 to 1945 Falkner was in the Royal Air Force Volunteer Reserve. During this time his singing career continued. In 1945, finding himself the Commanding Officer of a large RAF station, he was losing interest in just giving concerts and sought a more administrative role. He therefore gladly accepted an invitation to become Music Officer for the British Council in Italy for four years, where he worked with Francis Toye. When the British Council ran out of money, Adrian Boult made contacts who arranged for him to open and develop the Voice Department at Cornell University in the United States, where he remained for ten years.

There he was a visiting professor in 1950–1951, associate professor in 1951–1956, and full professor from 1956 to 1960. The Cornell University Music Library holds a small archive of his papers. While working on his Four Last Songs, Ralph Vaughan Williams and his wife visited Falkner at Cornell, particularly interested in "Menelaus" and "Hands, Eyes and Heart"; in 1956 a first performance of the latter was given. In his first years there he appeared in performances of The Creation (Haydn) and Alexander's Feast (Handel). He also made a complete recording of Schumann's Dichterliebe on acetate discs with pianist John Hunt in 1952, for the university.

In 1960, Falkner became Director of the Royal College of Music in London (the post formerly held by his first teacher, Hugh Allen), and remained there until 1974. He was created a Knight Bachelor in the 1967 Birthday Honours. He wrote the volume on Voice in the Yehudi Menuhin series of Musical Studies. In 1979 he was made a Fellow of the Royal Society of Arts (FRSA). From 1981 to 1983 he was joint artistic director of the King's Lynn Festival.

Among other distinctions he was a fellow of the Guildhall School of Music and of the Trinity College of Music in London, an honorary doctor of music at Oxford University, and a vice-president of the Royal College of Music and of the Bach Choir. In 1991 he appeared in a BBC Radio 4 interview with Roy Henderson and Richard Baker.

== Death ==
Falkner died at Ilketshall St Margaret, Suffolk, aged 94, in 1994.

== Literature ==
- Julia Falkner, Keith Falkner: Ich Habe Genug (Thames, 1998). ISBN 9780905210872
