= It's Not Cricket =

It's Not Cricket may refer to:

- It's Not Cricket (1937 film), a British comedy film starring Claude Hulbert
- It's Not Cricket (1949 film), a British comedy film starring Basil Radford and Naunton Wayne
- It's not cricket, an English-language phrase meaning unsportsmanlike conduct in sports, in business, or in life in general
- "It's Not Cricket", a song by the band Squeeze from their album Cool for Cats
