= Thistledown (film) =

1938 film by Arthur B. Woods

- Aino Bergo and Keith Falkner in the film
- Directed by: Arthur B. Woods
- Screenplay by: Brock Williams
- Story by: John Meehan Jr. & J. O. C. Orton
- Produced by: Irving Asher
- Starring: Aino Bergo; Keith Falkner; Athole Stewart
- Cinematography: Basil Emmott
- Music by: Kenneth Leslie-Smith; James Dyrenforth (lyricist: songs)
- Production company: Warner Brothers-First National Productions
- Distributed by: Warner Bros. (UK)
- Release date: March 1938 (UK)
- Running time: 78 minutes
- Country: United Kingdom
- Language: English

Thistledown is a 1938 British musical film directed by Arthur B. Woods and starring Aino Bergo, Keith Falkner, Athole Stewart, Sharon Lynn and Amy Veness. it was written Brock Williams from a story by J.O.C. Orton and John Meehan Jr, and produced by Irving Asher.

The screenplay concerns the Austrian wife of a Scottish aristocrat.

== Preservation status ==
The British Film Institute has classed Thistledown as a lost film. Its National Archive holds a collection of ephemera and stills but no film or video materials.

== Premise ==
Therese, an ex-operatic star married to Lord Glenloch, is unhappy with her life on her husband's estate. Driven away by his unfriendly family, Therese flees to Vienna to resume her career. Years later, and by now rich and famous, she buys the Glenloch estate, which has become run-down since Lord Glenloch went abroad seeking his fortune. On his return he and Therese reconcile.

== Cast ==
- Aino Bergo as Therese Glenloch
- Keith Falkner as Sir Ian Glenloch
- Athole Stewart as Duke of Invergower
- Sharon Lynn as Ivy Winter
- Bruce Lester as Lord James Dunfoyle
- Ian Maclean as Rossini
- Amy Veness as Mary Glenloch
- Vera Bogetti as Simmonds
- Gordon McLeod as Gallagher

== Reception ==
The Monthly Film Bulletin wrote: "An unsophisticated story most attractively played. Aino Bergo, as Therese, is a little stilted and self-conscious in her poses, but compensates for this by an outstanding voice and an attractive appearance. Keith Falkner as Lord Glenloch steals the picture. He has an engaging personality and an exquisite voice. Athol Stewart is also outstandingly good. An excellent film with a high standard of acting and photography as well as musical merit."

Kine Weekly wrote: "The drama is traditionally Scottish, inasmuch as it has economy of plot; otherwise its native canvas is painted in very artless and casual colours. Much is left unxplained. It is also doubtful whether the detail which includes liberal doses of music on the bagpipes, is authentic, but one thing is certain, what entertainment, true or synthetic, there is lies in the naive picturesqueness of the presentation rather than the story. Family appeal is the play's strongest pillar."

The Daily Film Renter wrote: "Uninteresting story of marital vicissitudes attendant on Scots nobleman and Viennese actress wife. Action takes back seat for banal dialogue, direction mediocre and continuity jerky. Scottish settings, however, are impressive, and Keith Falkner's singing is pleasant, while Sharon Lynne scoops honours as comedy American. Quota offering for the not too exacting."

Picturegoer wrote: "Artless marital drama, chiefly interesting for picturesque Scottish backgrounds ... Aino Bergo, Continental newcomer, impresses, but Keith Faulkner is inclined to be wooden as the hero."

Picture Show wrote: "Although basically there is a good idea behind this film, the story fails to make the most of it. ... It lacks drama, but a certain amount of compensation is given by a couple of Scottish songs pleasantly sung by Keith Falkner, whose singing is much better than his acting, and one or two well-staged spectacular scenes in the Scottish castle."
