= Bellevue Apartment Building =

- U.S. National Register of Historic Places
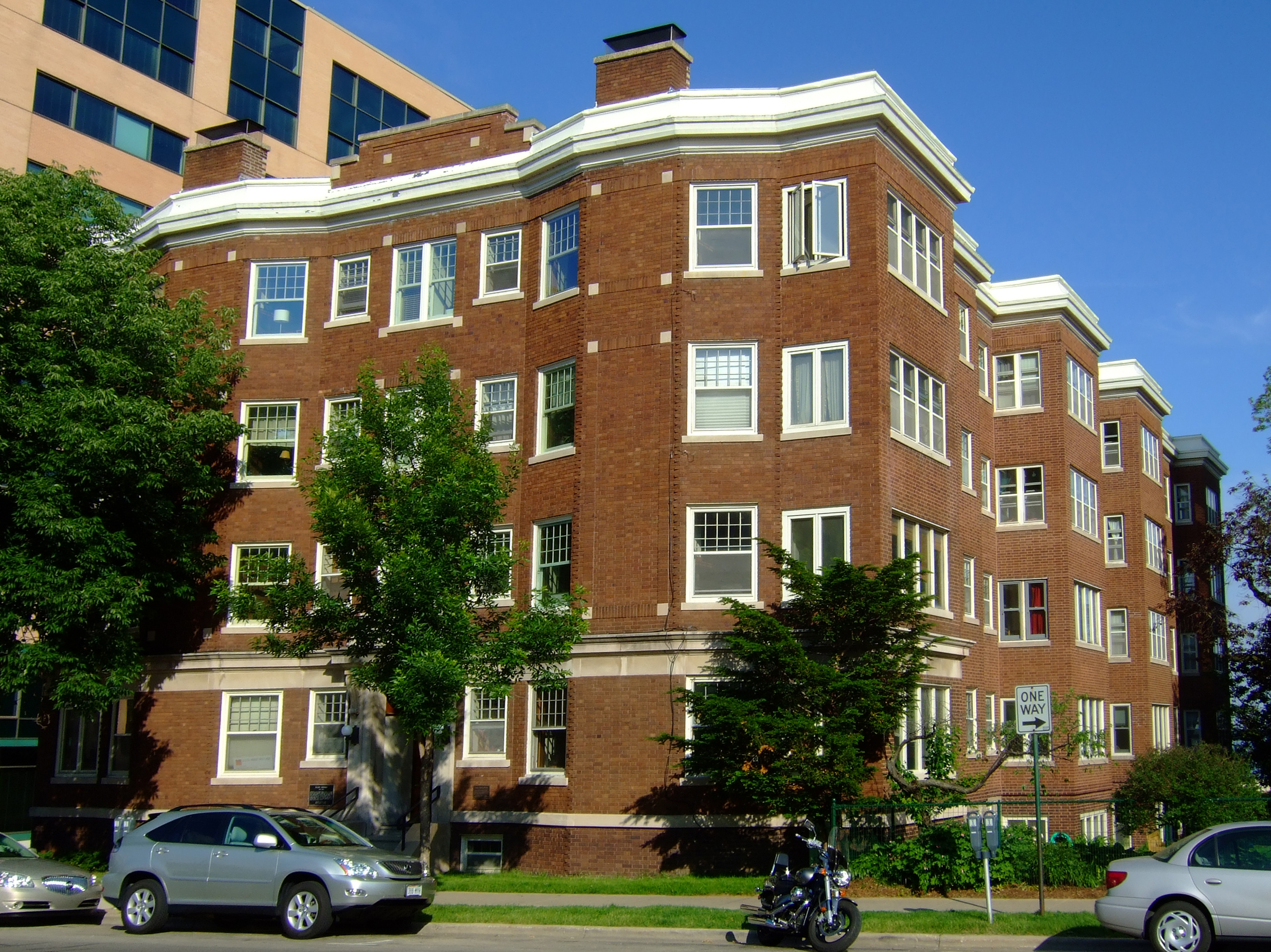
- Bellevue Apartment Building
- Location: 29 East Wilson Street; Madison, Wisconsin
- Coordinates: 43.07302°N 89.38007°W
- Built: 1913–1914
- Architect: Charles E. Marks
- NRHP reference No.: 87000433
- Added to NRHP: March 13, 1987

The Bellevue Apartment Building is an upscale early apartment building located just south of the capitol in Madison, Wisconsin, United States. It was completed in 1914 and was added to the National Register of Historic Places on March 13, 1987.

== History ==
Up to the 1900s the neighborhood south of the capitol was one of the poshest in Madison, with grand houses and mansions looking out over Lake Monona. As the capitol and businesses expanded, large office buildings began to replace the homes nearby, and more housing was needed for white collar workers. In response to these needs, a boom in apartment buildings started around 1910. One of the earliest and finest was the Bellevue Apartments, built 1913-14.

The Bellevue was designed and built by Charles E. Marks, a local builder. The building is four stories tall on a raised basement, all clad in red brick. The general rectangular shape is broken by full-height bays. A pressed-metal cornice circles the top of the building and short stout chimneys rise from the roof. Inside, the building originally had 36 apartments, trimmed in generous Craftsman-style woodwork, including moldings and picture rails. Each apartment also had a brick fireplace with a wooden mantel, a built-in cabinet with leaded glass doors from which a bed could originally be pulled out. Each apartment had a five by ten foot screened sun porch in its bay. They have since been closed in with permanent glass. The building had many features that were progressive at the time: an electric passenger elevator, a central vacuum system, iceboxes cooled via ammonia brine by a central cooling system in the basement, private phones, and a garbage disposal. Though each apartment had a kitchenette, meals could be ordered from a kitchen in the basement, to be delivered to the room by a dumbwaiter. An early advertisement for the building suggested that all these services offered "relief from the servant problem."

With all these features, the Bellevue was the most luxurious of the apartment buildings of its era. Marks aimed for a middle or upper-class renter and he succeeded. Early occupants included salesmen, businessmen like an executive of Madison Gas and Electric, government professionals and university professionals.

Other than the Bellevue, Charles Marks mostly designed and built upscale homes in Madison. Surviving examples include his own 1902 American Foursquare-style house at 1913 Madison St, his own 1905 Shingle style home at 1815 Jefferson St, possibly the 1907 Dutch Colonial Revival Page house at 1706 Madison St, the 1909 American Foursquare Smith house at 15 N Prospect Ave, the 1911 Craftsman house at 2015 Jefferson St where Marks and his family lived from 1911 to 1918, the 1912 Craftsman Olson house at 1909 Adams St, the 1915 Arts and Crafts-style Dr. Charles and Caroline Mills house at 2119 Jefferson St, and the 1916 Prairie School Hool house at 2809 Columbia Road.

In 1986 the Bellevue was designated a landmark by the Madison Landmarks Commission. In 1987 it was listed on the National Register of Historic Places, significant as "the largest and most intact of all the earliest apartment houses constructed in Madison during the first two decades of the twentieth century." It is also significant for the high quality of its interior design.
