= Vulpius =

Vulpius is a surname, derived from Latin vulpes, "fox". Notable people with the surname include:

- Christian August Vulpius (1762–1827), German novelist and dramatist
- Christiane Vulpius (1765–1816), wife of Johann Wolfgang Goethe, sister of Christian August Vulpius
- Johann Samuel Vulpius (1760–1846), German botanist
- Melchior Vulpius (c. 1570–1615), German singer and composer
- Paul Vulpius (1880–1957), German singer and composer
