= Office wife =

Office wife may refer to:

- Office wife, a wording for work spouse
- The Office Wife (1930 film), a 1930 American pre-Code romantic drama film
- The Office Wife (1934 film), a 1934 British comedy film
