= 1937 in British television =

This is a list of events related to British television in 1937.

== Events ==
=== January ===
- 5 January – BBC Television begins broadcasting The Orchestra and Its Instruments, one of the earliest documentary series produced for British television.
- 19 January – BBC Television broadcasts The Underground Murder Mystery by J. Bissell Thomas, the first play written for television.
- 21 January – BBC Television begins broadcasting Cook's Night Out with restaurateur Marcel Boulestin, probably the first television cookery series.

=== February ===
- 6 February – The BBC Television Service drops the Baird system in favour of the Marconi-EMI 405 lines system.

=== April ===
- 14 April – An exhibition snooker match between Horace Lindrum and Willie Smith is shown on the BBC. This is the first time that snooker is shown on television.

=== May ===
- 12 May – The BBC use their outside broadcast unit for the first time, to televise the coronation of George VI and Elizabeth. A fragment of this broadcast is one of the earliest surviving examples of British television, filmed off-screen at home by an engineer with an 8 mm cine camera. A short section of this footage is used in a programme during the week of the 1953 coronation of Elizabeth II and this latter programme survives in the BBC's archives.
- 14 May – The BBC Television Service broadcasts a thirty-minute excerpt of Twelfth Night, the first known instance of a Shakespeare play on television. Among the cast are Greer Garson and Peggy Ashcroft who appears in a 1939 telecast of the entire play.

=== June ===
- 18 June – Broadcast of the Agatha Christie play Wasp's Nest, the only instance of Christie adapting one of her works for television, a medium she later came to dislike.
- 21 June – Wimbledon Championships (tennis) first shown on the BBC Television Service.

=== September ===
- 16 September – Football is televised for the first time. It is a specially-arranged friendly match between Arsenal and Arsenal Reserves at Highbury.

=== November ===
- 11 November (Armistice Day) – BBC Television shows this morning's National Service of Remembrance as a live outside broadcast from The Cenotaph in London, the first time the ceremony has been televised, and devotes the evening to a broadcast of Journey's End by R. C. Sherriff (1928, set on the Western Front (World War I) in 1918), the first full-length television adaptation of a stage play and the first time that a whole evening's programming has been given over to a single play. Reginald Tate plays the lead, Stanhope, a role he has performed extensively in the theatre.

=== December ===
- 31 December – 2,121 television sets have been sold in England.

== Debuts ==
- 19 January – The Underground Murder Mystery (1937)
- 12 April – Cabaret Cruise (1937–1939; 1946; 1949)
- 17 April – The Disorderly Room (1937–1939)
- 24 April – For the Children (1937–1939, 1946–1952)
- 14 May – Twelfth Night (1937)
- 19 May – The School for Scandal (1937)
- 18 June – Wasp's Nest (1937)
- 7 July – How He Lied to Her Husband (1937)
- 21 October – Night Must Fall (1937)
- 11 November – Journey's End (1937)
- 14 December – Tele-Ho! (1937)
- 20 December – The Ghost Train (1937)
- Unknown – Sports Review (1937)
- Unknown – Starlight (1937–1939; 1946–1949)

== Continuing television shows ==
=== 1920s ===
- BBC Wimbledon (1927–1939, 1946–2019, 2021–present)

=== 1930s ===
- Picture Page (1936–1939, 1946–1952)

== Births ==
- 1 January – Anne Aubrey, actress
- 7 January – Ian La Frenais, comedy scriptwriter
- 9 January – Michael Nicholson, journalist (died 2016)
- 30 January – Vanessa Redgrave, actress
- 7 February – Peter Jay, economist, broadcaster and diplomat (died 2024)
- 9 February – Alan Rothwell, actor (died 2026)
- 25 February – Tom Courtenay, actor
- 8 March – Justine Lord, actress
- 27 March – Alan Hawkshaw, theme tune composer (died 2021)
- 9 April – Valerie Singleton, presenter
- 11 April – Jill Gascoine, actress and novelist (died 2020)
- 26 April – Gareth Gwenlan, Welsh-born television comedy producer and executive (died 2016)
- 1 May – Una Stubbs, actress (died 2021)
- 12 May – Susan Hampshire, actress
- 19 May – Pat Roach, actor and wrestler (died 2004)
- 5 August – Carla Lane, comedy writer (died 2016)
- 6 August – Barbara Windsor, actress (died 2020)
- 18 August – Willie Rushton, comedian, actor and writer (died 1996)
- 20 August – Jim Bowen, comedian and host (died 2018)
- 2 September – Derek Fowlds, actor (died 2020)
- 5 September – Dick Clement, comedy scriptwriter
- 16 September – Bella Emberg, born Sybil Dyke, comedy actress (died 2018)
- 14 November – Alan J. W. Bell, director and producer (died 2023)
- 17 November – Peter Cook, comedian and writer (died 1995)
- 27 November – Rodney Bewes, actor (died 2017)
- 29 November – Ingrid Pitt, actress (died 2010)
- 20 December – Charles Denton, producer
- 29 December – Barbara Steele, actress
- Brian Cooke, scriptwriter
- Geoffrey Hinsliff, actor (died 2024)

== See also ==
- 1937 in British music
- 1937 in the United Kingdom
- List of British films of 1937
