= Arthur B. Woods =

English film director (1904–1944)

- Born: 17 August 1904; Liverpool, England
- Died: 8 February 1944 (aged 39); Emsworth, Hampshire, England
- Occupation: Film director
- Years active: 1933–1940

Arthur Bickerstaffe Woods (17 August 1904 – 8 February 1944) was an English film director with 27 credits between 1933 and 1940. Woods' films were mainly quota quickies but were diverse in style, from light comedy and musicals to dark crime thrillers. His most acclaimed film is 1938's They Drive by Night. By the end of the 1930s Woods was gaining a reputation as one of Britain's most promising and versatile young directors, but put his career on hold to volunteer for war service in the Royal Air Force, the only British film director to do so. He was killed while on active service in February 1944.

== Early life ==
Born into a wealthy shipping family in Liverpool, Woods was educated at the exclusive Downside School in Somerset before enrolling to study medicine at Christ's College, Cambridge at the behest of his father. Before completing his studies however, he dropped out to join a travelling repertory company. Aged 22, he obtained employment with a documentary film unit and gained experience over the following few years. In 1929 he picked up his only screen acting credit in the film Lost Patrol. On 27 August 1932 at the Brooklands School of Flying he was awarded the Royal Aero Club aviator certificate #10735.

== Directing career ==
In 1933, Woods joined British International Pictures, becoming the company's youngest director. His first solo assignment On Secret Service was well received. This was a thriller, but Woods spent the next four years making comedies and musical films (including three with popular singer Keith Falkner which represented Falkner's entire screen output) before starting also to take on crime films, starting with The Dark Stairway, made in 1937 and released in early 1938. Many of his films involved collaborations with producer Irving Asher, cinematographer Basil Emmott and screenwriter Brock Williams, while another frequent association was with actress Chili Bouchier. As was the case with many non-prestige British films of the 1930s, little attention or care was given to Woods' films after their original cinema run, and most of his films from the mid-1930s are now considered lost.

In 1938 Woods returned to the thriller genre with They Drive by Night. This was still a quota quickie, but exceptionally dark and bleak in tone and execution. They Drive by Night has survived, and later assessments rate it very highly. Paul Moody of the British Film Institute summarises the film as: "(London) is presented as the site of all that is wrong with society – a place where a convict is the closest one can get to a hero, where a young girl can be murdered in her own home, and where a pillar of the community is actually a murderer." Time Out reviewer Robert Murphy wrote: "The fusion of quirky British realism and slick Hollywood melodramatics produced a real gem. Woods...takes the workmanlike story of a petty criminal...and invests it with an atmosphere of unrelenting wind, rain and gloom which makes the average American film noir look bright and breezy by comparison."

Woods' reputation was further enhanced by the 1939 spy drama Q Planes (co-directed with Tim Whelan) and his final film Busman's Honeymoon, a Dorothy L. Sayers adaptation.

== World War II ==
Woods, already a skilled pilot, joined the Royal Air Force Volunteer Reserve in 1939 as a Navigator. He was involved in the Battle of Britain later that year, and in 1942 was awarded the Air Force Cross. On 8 February 1944, Flight Lieutenant Woods was killed in a mid-air collision over the Hampshire coast, aged 39. Woods and his pilot Norwegian Jan Otto Bugge were flying a de Havilland Mosquito night fighter when it collided with a Vickers Wellington and crashed at Emsworth, killing them both.

== Filmography (director) ==
- 1933: Timbuctoo
- 1933: On Secret Service
- 1934: Radio Parade of 1935
- 1934: Give Her a Ring
- 1935: Once in a Million
- 1935: Music Hath Charms
- 1935: Drake of England
- 1936: Rhythm in the Air
- 1936: Where's Sally? ♦
- 1936: Irish for Luck ♦
- 1937: Mayfair Melody ♦
- 1937: The Windmill ♦
- 1937: The Compulsory Wife ♦
- 1937: Don't Get Me Wrong
- 1937: You Live and Learn ♦
- 1938: The Singing Cop ♦
- 1938: The Dark Stairway ♦
- 1938: Mr. Satan
- 1938: Thistledown ♦
- 1938: Glamour Girl
- 1938: The Return of Carol Deane
- 1938: Dangerous Medicine ♦
- 1938: They Drive by Night
- 1939: Q Planes
- 1939: The Nursemaid Who Disappeared
- 1939: Confidential Lady ♦
- 1940: Busman's Honeymoon

♦ These films are confirmed by the British Film Institute as currently missing and believed lost.
