= Glamour Girl (1938 film) =

1938 film by Arthur B. Woods

- Advertisement from The Daily Film Renter (15 February 1938)
- Directed by: Arthur B. Woods
- Written by: John Meehan Jr. Tom Phipps
- Produced by: William Collier Jr.
- Starring: Gene Gerrard; Lesley Brook; Ross Landon
- Cinematography: Basil Emmott
- Edited by: Leslie Norman
- Production company: Warner Brothers-First National Productions
- Distributed by: Warner Bros. (UK)
- Release date: March 1938 (UK)
- Running time: 68 minutes
- Country: United Kingdom
- Language: English

Glamour Girl (also known as Love Insurance) is a 1938 British comedy film directed by Arthur B. Woods and starring Gene Gerrard, Lesley Brook, Ross Landon, Betty Lynne and Leslie Weston. It was written by John Meehan Jr. and Tom Phipps. It marked the last film appearance of American actor James Carew.

== Plot ==
A commercial photographer leaves his job to become a painter, and using his secretary as a model.

== Cast ==
- Gene Gerrard as Dean Webster
- Lesley Brook as Connie Stevens
- Ross Landon as Taylor Brooks
- Betty Lynne as Vicki
- Leslie Weston as Murphy
- Dennis Arundell as Sir Raymond Bell
- Robert Rendel as J.J.Andex
- James Carew as Collins
- Jimmy Godden as Arnold

== Production ==
It was made Teddington Studios as a quota quickie by the British subsidiary of Warner Bros.

== Reception ==
The Monthly Film Bulletin wrote: "This film is British by naturalisation only: the direction is smooth, the lighting brilliant, and the dialogue rapid. A modern fairy tale, entertaining enough, forgotten almost as soon as seen."

Kine Weekly wrote: "Most of the early scenes are taken up with shots of the work of a commercial photographer. They are quite interesting and also give scope for leg 'art'." Production and camera work are generally good but the story is too slow and lacking in purpose to hold the attention at all firmly. There is an attempt at the end to make a dramatic climax when Connie faints after posing and her flimsy clothes catch fire, but it comes too late to put any pep into the plot."

The Daily Film Renter wrote: "This not particularly interesting plot is presented mainly in terms of dull dialogue, while conviction is often conspicuous by its absence. ... Acting honours are easily annexed by Betty Lynne, who is extremely vivacious as a photographic model. Gene Gerrard and Lesley Brook sustain the leads."

Picturegoer wrote: "There's a certain amount of novelty about the background of this slight romantic plot. It is played in a commercial photographer's studio and gives scope for fairly extensive leg displays, but is over-dialogued and lacking in action."

Picture Show wrote: "Gene Gerrard's comedy talents are somewhat submerged by the thoroughly unlikeable character he has to play in this film. ... Mildly entertaining."
