= Leslie Weston =

British actor (1896–1975)

- 1930s postcard
- Born: 24 July 1896; Thornton Heath, Surrey, England, UK
- Died: 13 October 1975 (aged 79); Palma Nova, Majorca, Spain
- Other name: Johnny Walker
- Occupations: Film actor Television actor
- Years active: 1938–1963

Leslie Weston (24 July 1896 – 13 October 1975) was a British actor who was also a radio and variety comedian.

== Selected filmography ==
- Glamour Girl (1938)
- They Drive by Night (1938)
- Two for Danger (1940)
- We Dive at Dawn (1943)
- Send for Paul Temple (1946)
- Green Fingers (1947)
- My Brother Jonathan (1948)
- Corridor of Mirrors (1948)
- Sleeping Car to Trieste (1948)
- It's Hard to Be Good (1948)
- Poet's Pub (1949)
- Last Holiday (1950) (Hôtel Staff)
- The Lady with a Lamp (1951)
- The Last Page (1952)
- The Woman's Angle (1952)
- Derby Day (1952)
- The Night Won't Talk (1952)
- Folly to Be Wise (1953)
- The Embezzler (1954)
- Views on Trial (1954)
- Betrayed (1954) as "Pop"
- Above Us the Waves (1955)
- The Last Man to Hang (1956)
- The Green Man (1956)
- Three Men in a Boat (1956)
- Manuela (1957)
- High Flight (1957)
- The House of the Seven Hawks (1959)
