= Frederick Burtwell =

English actor (1894–1948)

- in The Stars Look Down (1940)
- Born: Augustus Frederick Burtwell; 23 December 1894; Bermondsey, South London, England
- Died: 16 November 1948 (aged 53); Hendon, Middlesex, England
- Occupation: Actor
- Years active: 1931-1947

Augustus Frederick Burtwell (23 December 1894 – 16 November 1948) was an English actor, on stage from 1914, who featured in supporting roles in over 40 British films of the 1930s and 1940s.

== Partial filmography ==
- Other People's Sins (1931)
- Down Our Street (1932)
- Just My Luck (1933)
- The Path of Glory (1934)
- Inside the Room (1935)
- Midshipman Easy (1935)
- This'll Make You Whistle (1936)
- Laburnum Grove (1936)
- Educated Evans (1936)
- Twelve Good Men (1936)
- The Vulture (1937)
- It's Not Cricket (1937)
- Doctor Syn (1937)
- Feather Your Nest (1937)
- French Leave (1937)
- Gypsy (1937)
- The Singing Cop (1938)
- I See Ice (1938)
- Penny Paradise (1938)
- Dangerous Medicine (1938)
- Everything Happens to Me (1938)
- A Girl Must Live (1939)
- Murder Will Out (1939)
- Confidential Lady (1939)
- His Brother's Keeper (1940)
- The Stars Look Down (1940)
- This Was Paris (1942)
- Partners in Crime (1942)
- Much Too Shy (1942)
- The Silver Fleet (1943)
- We Dive at Dawn (1943)
- The Dark Tower (1943 film) (1943)
- I'll Be Your Sweetheart (1945)
- The Rake's Progress (1945)
- The Laughing Lady (1946)
- Gaiety George (1946)
- They Knew Mr. Knight (1946)
- Nicholas Nickleby (1947)
- Uncle Silas (1947)
