= Bitter Sweet (operetta) =

Operetta by Noël Coward

Nelson Eddy and Jeanette MacDonald in the 1940 film version, described by Coward as "dreadful"

Bitter Sweet is an operetta in three acts, with book, music and lyrics by Noël Coward. The story, set in nineteenth-century and early twentieth-century England and Austria-Hungary, centres on a young woman's elopement with her music teacher. The songs from the score include "The Call of Life", "If You Could Only Come with Me", "I'll See You Again", "Dear Little Café", "If Love Were All", "Ladies of the Town", "Tokay", "Zigeuner" and "Green Carnation".

The show had a long run in the West End from 1929 to 1931, and a more modest one on Broadway in 1929–1930. The work has twice been adapted for the cinema, and the complete score has been recorded for CD.

== Background ==
Coward wrote the leading role of Sari with Gertrude Lawrence in mind, but the vocal demands of the part were beyond her capabilities. His second choice, Evelyn Laye, refused the role because of a private grievance against the producer of the show, C. B. Cochran. Coward's third choice, Peggy Wood, made a considerable success in the part, and Laye, realising her mistake in turning it down, willingly accepted the role in the subsequent Broadway production. For the part of the leading man, Cochran and Coward toured the theatres of Europe in search of someone suitable. According to Coward, a likely candidate named Hans Unterfucker was ruled out because of his name, and George Metaxa was cast.

=== Original cast ===
- Parker, a butler – Claude Farrow
- Dolly Chamberlain – Dorothy Bond
- Lord Henry – William Harn
- Vincent Howard – Billy Milton
- Marchioness of Shayne (Sari) – Peggy Wood
- Marquess of Shayne – Alan Napier
- Carl Linden – George Metaxa
- Manon la Crevette – Ivy St Helier
- Nita – Isla Bevan
- Captain August Lutte – Austin Trevor
- Hugh Devon – Robert Newton
- Helen – Nancy Bevill
- Jackie – Maureen Moore
- Frank – Arthur Alexander

Source: The Times and Stanley Green.

== Plot ==
=== Act I ===
In 1929, the elderly and widowed, but still lively, Marchioness of Shayne is holding a party at her home in London to celebrate the impending society marriage of a young woman, Dolly Chamberlain, who is in love not with her fiancé but with a poor musician ("That Wonderful Melody"). Dolly is torn between love and fortune, and Lady Shane is reminded of her own youth ("The Call of Life").

Nearly 55 years earlier, in 1875, Lady Shayne is the young Sarah Millick, a wealthy London society debutante, who is having a singing lesson with her dashing music teacher, Carl Linden. The spirited Sarah is engaged to Lord Hugh, a wealthy but stuffy young nobleman, but Sarah and Carl have fallen in love ("If You Could Only Come With Me"). Carl's integrity makes him decide not to ruin Sarah's 'proper' life and return directly to his native Austria, but vows to think of Sarah each Spring ("I'll See You Again"). At the pre-wedding party, Sarah realises she would be unhappy with Lord Hugh and that true love is more important ("What Is Love?"). Carl is entertaining at the party ("The Last Dance"). Later, during a game of blindman's buff, Carl and Sarah declare their mutual love and decide to elope to Vienna.

=== Act II ===
Five years later, in Vienna, Carl is a bandleader, and Sarah (now called Sari), sings his songs, but their employment at Schlick's Café, a racy establishment patronised by army officers and whores, requires Sari to dance with the patrons, and perhaps more ("Ladies of the Town"). Carl's previous lover, Manon La Crevette, entertains at the café and expresses feelings of lost love ("If Love Were All"). Sari and Carl plan to quit and find their dream café ("Dear Little Café"), but it's a busy night ("Tokay"), and after Manon's number ("Bonne Nuit, Merci"), Sari is obliged to dance with an army captain who makes a determined pass, provoking Carl to intervene. The captain challenges him to a duel, which he wins easily, killing Carl; Sari is distraught, as Manon reprises a sad waltz number ("Kiss Me").

=== Act III ===
Thirteen years pass, and in 1893 London it is the Gay Nineties ("Ta Ra Ra Boom De Ay"; "Green Carnation"). The young ladies are now respectable society matrons ("Alas! The Time is Past"). Sari, now a Viennese star singing Carl's music ("Zigeuner"), is pursued by the Marquis of Shayne, who seeks to restore her youthful spirit. He has proposed to her in every European capital, and now home in London, she finally accepts him, but reprises "I'll See You Again" to her lost love, Carl.

Again at the 1929 party, Dolly, inspired by Lady Shane's story of love pursued and lost, rejects her society fiancé and declares her love for the poor musician, whose reaction is to burst into a syncopated piano rendition of "I'll See You Again" as the heartbroken Sarah gives way to bitter mirth.

== Critical reception ==
After the opening night in Manchester the reviewer in The Manchester Guardian wrote that the future of the show seemed rosy: "If a wealth of light melody, a spice of wit, and much beauty of setting can assure it, Mr Coward need have no misgivings". In London, James Agate praised the piece: "a thundering good job … a thoroughly good light entertainment". When the piece was revived in 1988, Jeremy Kingston wrote in The Times, "Coward's melodic gift reached its peak in this show, with its gipsy music, drinking song, witty jokes about the gay Nineties and the waltzes that, once heard, are imperishable."

== Productions ==
The piece, directed by Coward, opened on 2 July 1929 at the Palace Theatre, Manchester, before the London premiere at His Majesty's Theatre on 18 July. It ran in London for 697 performances, at five different theatres, concluding its run at the Lyceum, with Laye returning from New York to succeed Wood as Sari. Ivy St. Helier played Manon, and the role of the aged Marquess of Shayne was played by the 26-year-old Alan Napier, later to gain fame as Batman's butler, Alfred.

With the success of the London production, Cochran wanted a Broadway presentation. Rather than wait until the end of the West End run and take the original cast to New York, Cochran insisted on moving quickly. The musical opened on Broadway on 5 November 1929, starring Evelyn Laye as Sari. She was well received by audiences and critics, but otherwise the cast was not as strong as their London counterparts. The production ran for 159 performances, closing on 22 March 1930.

Although popular with amateur operatic societies, Bitter Sweet has had few professional revivals. A Broadway production played in 1934, starring Evelyn Herbert and Allan Jones. In America, the St. Louis Municipal Opera presented six productions of Bitter Sweet between 1933 and 1953 as well as one in 1974. The Long Beach Civic Light Opera in Southern California staged a production in 1983 starring Shirley Jones as Sari. The first professional revival in London was in 1988 at Sadler's Wells; Valerie Masterson and Ann Mackay alternated as Sari, with Martin Smith as Carl and Rosemary Ashe as Manon. The Ohio Light Opera produced Bitter Sweet in 1993, 1998 and 2025.

== Adaptations and cultural depictions ==
The piece has been filmed twice. The first, in 1933, directed by Herbert Wilcox was filmed in black-and-white, with Anna Neagle and Fernand Gravet in the leading roles. An opulent Technicolor version for MGM in 1940, directed by W. S. Van Dyke, starred Jeanette MacDonald and Nelson Eddy. In both cases, the score was heavily cut. Coward disliked the much-rewritten 1940 film and vowed that no more of his plays would be filmed in Hollywood. In 1951 he told The Daily Express, "I was saving up Bitter Sweet as an investment for my old age. After MGM's dreadful film I can never revive it."

Abridged recordings have been made starring Vanessa Lee (1960) and June Bronhill (1969) The first recording of the complete score was issued in 1989, based on the 1988 Sadler's Wells production, with Masterson as Sari.

A scene from the operetta is depicted in the opening of the 2025 period film Downton Abbey: The Grand Finale.

== Musical numbers ==
=== Act I ===
- That Wonderful Melody – Singer and Dancing Chorus
- The Call of Life – The Marchioness of Shayne and Chorus
- If You Could Only Come with Me – Carl Linden
- I'll See You Again – Sarah Millick and Carl
- Polka
- Tell Me What is Love? – Sarah and Chorus
- The Last Dance – The Marquis of Steere, Lord Edgar James, Lord Sorrel, Mr. Vale, Mr. Bethel, Mr. Proutie, Victoria, Harriet, Gloria, Honor, Jane and Effie
- Finale

=== Act II ===
- Life in the Morning – Waiters and Cleaners
- Ladies of the Town – Lotte, Freda, Hansi and Gussie
- If Love Were All – Manon
- Evermore and a Day – Sari Linden
- Dear Little Café – Sari and Carl
- Bitter Sweet Waltz
- We Wish to Order Wine –
- Tokay – Carl, Officers and Chorus
- Bonne Nuit, Merci – Manon
- Kiss me – Manon and Chorus

=== Act III ===
- Ta-ra-ra Boom-de-ay (by Henry J. Sayers) – Wealthy and noble couples of London
- Alas! The Time is Past – The Duchess of Tenterton, Lady James, Mrs. Proutie, Lady Sorrel, Mrs. Vale and Mrs. Bethel
- We All Wear a Green Carnation – Bertram Sellick, Lord Henry Jade, Vernon Craft and Cedrick Ballantyne
- Zigeuner – Sari
- I'll See You Again (reprise) – Sari

The Noël Coward Society's website, drawing on performing statistics from the publishers and the Performing Right Society, ranks "I'll See You Again" and "If Love Were All" as among Coward's ten most popular songs. "Dear Little Café" is among the top twenty.
