= Joan Miller (actress) =

Canadian actress (1910–1988)

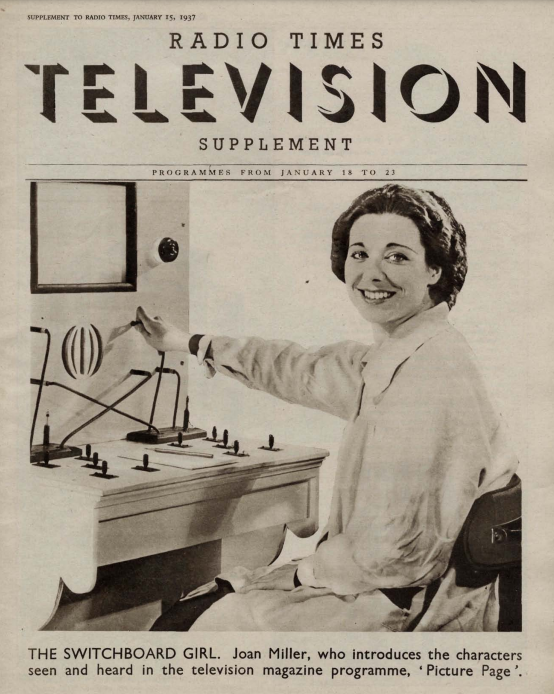
Joan Miller at the switchboard in the early television magazine programme Picture Page in 1937

Joan Miller (18 February 1910 – 31 August 1988) in Nelson, British Columbia, Canada was an actress. She moved to London, UK in 1931 to pursue a career in acting.

Miller was the face of Picture Page, a topical magazine programme that began on the nascent BBC television service in 1936, broadcast from Alexandra Palace. In the programme Miller played the part of a switchboard operator "connecting" viewers to the show's guests; "introducing visitors, types and personalities". Before each interview Miller, sitting at a telephone switchboard, would introduce each guest. The programme was popular amongst early television viewers. However, the mock switchboard's homespun look was found to be irksome by the Television and Short-Wave World magazine. Miller got the job on the strength of her having been a trainer of switchboard operators in Vancouver.

In addition to her role on Picture Page, Miller's versatility was often called upon to act in various BBC plays and TV movies. On 6 December 1937 Miller played the role of May in a 90-minute televised play called Once in a Lifetime, a satire on the effect of talking pictures on the entertainment industry. She also played the role of Cleopatra in a skit "You Can't Take Your Needle With You, Cleo!" for a BBC comedy show.

When interviewed for the 18 January 1938 edition of the News Chronicle about the differences between the broadcasting of television and radio plays she said, "Unlike radio plays, you have to learn your part by heart, often at short notice. It is almost impossible to get a prompt, a prompt being horribly audible." A radio play being less arduous as the players require no costumes and the players read their lines directly from scripts.

Having played the part of the switchboard girl in 106 episodes in the space of 34 months, Miller's role ended when the BBC television service ceased broadcasting for the duration of the Second World War on 1 September 1939.

In addition to her film and TV roles, Miller was a theatre and radio actress too. She was the winner of the Bessborough Trophy for Best Canadian Actress in 1934.

== Personal life ==
Miller married Peter Cotes (brother of film makers John and Roy Boulting) in 1948. Peter was an actor, producer and director. Miller died on 31 August 1988 in Oxford, UK. She had suffered from a painful illness for most of her life. Miller had supported many causes and was vice-president of the animal welfare group Beauty Without Cruelty.

== Acting credits ==
Only where credited.

Year	Title	Role	Notes
1936	The Tiger	Louise Michel	TV movie
1937	Take It From Me	Secretary	
1937	The Happy Journey to Trenton and Camden	Mrs Kirby	TV movie
1937	Once in a Lifetime	May Daniels	TV movie
1938	Ah Wilderness!	Belle	TV movie
1938	On the Spot	Maria Pouliski	
1938	Telecrime	Sadie	TV series - 1 episode
1938	Whistling in the Dark	Toby Van Buren	TV movie
1936-39	Picture Page	The Switchboard Girl	TV series - 106 episodes
1947	Rosmersholm	Rebecca West	TV movie
1947	The Woman in the Hall	Susan	
1949	Criss Cross	"The Lush"	
1950	Forgery	Mrs Clara Evans	
1950	Fireside Theatre	Shirley	TV series - 1 episode
1950	The Unexpected		TV series - 1 episode
1952	BBC Sunday-Night Theatre	Momma Brodsky	TV series - 1 episode
1954	The Face of Love	Helen	TV Movie
1956	Yield to the Night	Barker	
1959	No Trees in the Street	Jess	
1960	Too Young to Love	Mrs. Collins	
1963	Heavens Above!	Mrs. Smith-Gould	
1965	For Whom the Bell Tolls	Pilar	TV Series
1976	The Birth of Television	Self	
