= Bitter Sweet (1940 film) =

1940 film

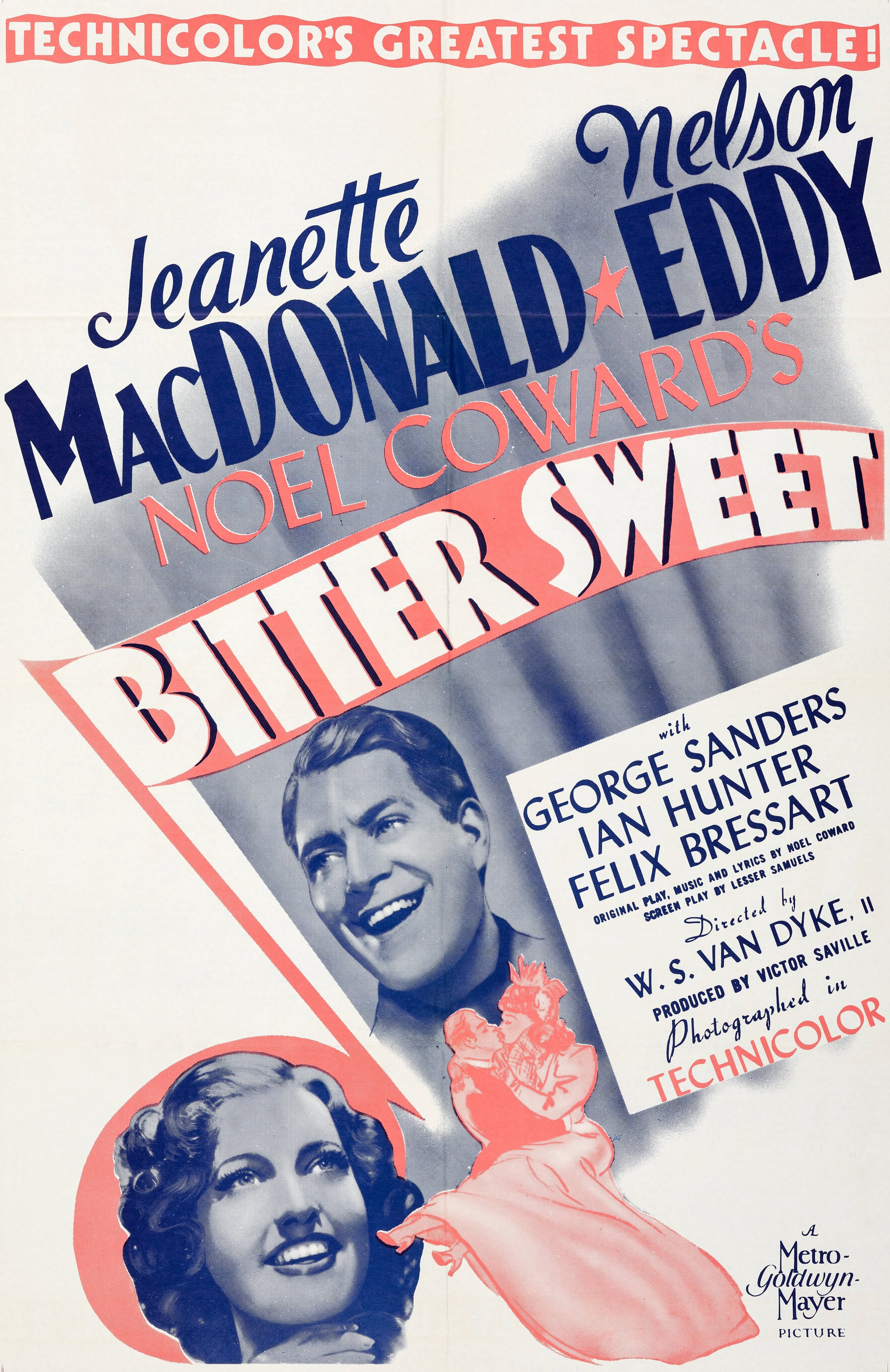
- Title card
- Directed by: W. S. Van Dyke
- Screenplay by: Lesser Samuels
- Story by: Lesser Samuels
- Based on: Bitter Sweet; 1929 operetta by Noël Coward
- Produced by: Victor Saville
- Starring: Jeanette MacDonald; Nelson Eddy; George Sanders
- Cinematography: Oliver T. Marsh; Allen M. Davey
- Edited by: Harold F. Kress
- Music by: Gus Kahn
- Production company: Metro-Goldwyn-Mayer
- Distributed by: Loew's Inc.
- Release date: November 8, 1940
- Running time: 94 minutes
- Country: United States
- Language: English
- Budget: $1.1 million
- Box office: $2.2 million

Bitter Sweet is a 1940 American Technicolor musical film directed by W. S. Van Dyke, based on the operetta Bitter Sweet by Noël Coward. It was nominated for two Academy Awards, one for Best Cinematography and the other for Best Art Direction by Cedric Gibbons and John S. Detlie.

The film is based on Coward's stage operetta, which was a hit in 1929 in London. It was filmed twice, first in 1933 in black-and-white (in Britain, with Anna Neagle and Fernand Gravet in the leading roles). The 1940 film is much cut and rewritten, removing much of the operetta's irony. The opening and closing scenes are cut, focusing the film squarely upon the relationship between MacDonald's character, Sarah, and her music teacher, Carl Linden. The opening scene was a flash forward, in which Sarah appears as an elderly woman recalling how she fell in love. One reason for dropping this scene is that it had been appropriated for MGM's 1937 film Maytime. Coward disliked the 1940 film and vowed that no more of his shows would be filmed in Hollywood. In 1951, he told The Daily Express, "I was saving up Bitter Sweet as an investment for my old age. After MGM's dreadful film I can never revive it" on stage.

== Plot ==
Set in late 19th century Vienna, the story focuses on the romance between music teacher Carl Linden and his prize pupil Sarah Milick.

== Cast ==
- Jeanette MacDonald as Sarah Millick, later Sari Linden
- Nelson Eddy as Carl Linden
- George Sanders as Baron Von Tranisch
- Ian Hunter as Lord Shayne
- Felix Bressart as Max
- Sig Ruman as Herr Schlock
- Diana Lewis as Jane
- Lynne Carver as Dolly
- Edward Ashley as Harry Daventry
- Curt Bois as Ernst
- Fay Holden as Mrs. Millick
- Janet Beecher as Lady Daventry
- Charles Judels as Herr Wyler
- Veda Ann Borg as Manon
- Herman Bing as Market Keeper
- Greta Meyer as Mama Luden

== Production ==
Filming started June 1940.

== Reception ==
Noël Coward later wrote about the film in his diaries in July 1946 when he saw the film for a second time with some friends:

Having only seen it once we had forgotten the full horror of it. It really is frightening that the minds of Hollywood could cheerfully perpetrate such a nauseating hotchpotch of vulgarity, false values, seedy dialogue, stale sentiment, vile performance and abominable direction. I had forgotten the insane coquetting of Miss Jeanette MacDonald allied to a triumphant lack of acting ability. I had forgotten the resolute, flabby heaviness of Mr Nelson Eddy. I had forgotten the sterling work of the gentleman who saw fit to rewrite my dialogue and lyrics, whose name is Samuels... this vulgar orgy of tenth-rate endeavour.

== Soundtrack ==
- "I'll See You Again"
  - Written by Noël Coward
  - Sung by Jeanette MacDonald and Nelson Eddy
- "Polka"
  - Written by Noël Coward
  - Played at the party and danced to by the guests
- "If You Could Only Come With Me"
  - Written by Noël Coward
  - Sung by Jeanette MacDonald and Nelson Eddy
- "What Is Love"
  - Written by Noël Coward
  - Sung by Jeanette MacDonald and Nelson Eddy
  - Reprised at Schlick's
- "Kiss Me"
  - Written by Noël Coward
  - Sung by Jeanette MacDonald
- "Tokay"
  - Written by Noël Coward
  - Sung by Nelson Eddy and the patrons at the cafe
- "Love In Any Language"
  - Written by Noël Coward
  - Sung by Jeanette MacDonald at the cafe
  - Partly dubbed by Ann Harriet Lee
- "Dear Little Cafe"
  - Words and Music by Noël Coward with additional lyrics by Gus Kahn
  - Sung by Jeanette MacDonald and Nelson Eddy
  - Reprised by Jeanette MacDonald
- "Ladies Of The Town"
  - Written by Noël Coward and Gus Kahn
  - Sung by Jeanette MacDonald and 2 uncredited female singers
- "Una voce poco fa"
  - From Gioacchino Rossini's The Barber of Seville
  - Danced by a dancing ensemble
- "Zigeuner (The Gypsy)"
  - Written by Noël Coward
  - Sung by Jeanette MacDonald in the operetta finale

== See also ==
- Bitter Sweet (1933 film)
