= Dead Men are Dangerous =

1939 British film by Harold French

- Directed by: Harold French
- Screenplay by: Victor Kendall; Vernon J. Clancey; Harry Hughes
- Based on: novel Hidden by H.C. Armstrong
- Produced by: Warwick Ward
- Starring: Robert Newton; Betty Lynne; John Warwick; Peter Gawthorne
- Cinematography: Ernest Palmer
- Edited by: E. Richards
- Music by: John Reynders (uncredited)
- Production company: Welwyn Studios
- Distributed by: Pathé Pictures International (UK), StudioCanal (UK)
- Release date: February 1939 (UK)
- Running time: 69 minutes
- Country: United Kingdom
- Language: English

Dead Men are Dangerous (U.S. title: Dangerous Masquerade) is a 1939 British noir crime film directed by Harold French and starring Robert Newton, Betty Lynne, John Warwick, and Peter Gawthorne. It was written by Victor Kendall, Vernon J. Clancey and Harry Hughes based on the story "Hidden" by H.C. Armstrong, and produced as a quota quickie at Welwyn Studios.

Its plot concerns an unsuccessful writer who is wrongly accused of a murder.

== Plot ==
Penniless and debt-ridden writer Aylmer Franklyn happens upon a dead man lying under the branch of a tree, apparently killed during a violent storm. Swapping clothes and identities with the corpse seems like a way out of his troubles, and Franklyn even attends his own inquest; but little does he know the man had a criminal history and he soon finds the police on his trail.

== Cast ==
- Robert Newton as Aylmer Franklyn
- Betty Lynne as Nina
- John Warwick as Goddard
- Peter Gawthorne as Conray
- Merle Tottenham as Gladys
- John Turnbull as Inspector Roberts
- Aubrey Mallalieu as coroner
- Kynaston Reeves as James T. Franklyn
- Winifred Oughton as Mrs Blagden
- Cyril Chamberlain as George Franklyn (uncredited)
- Charles Mortimer as policeman (uncredited)
- John Salew as tramp (uncredited)
- Anita Sharp-Bolster as spinster resident (uncredited)

== Critical reception ==
Kine Weekly wrote: "British crime play taking the form of a macabre and spectacular masquerade. Now and again the germ of the plot is allowed to assume somewhat extravagant proportions, but thanks to an emotionally secure performance on the part of Robert Newton, intelligent support, and showmanlike direction, fiction is in the main successfully harnessed in the interests of excitiag and thrilling mass entertainment. Production qualities are very good, while star values are far from inconsiderable."

The Daily Film Renter wrote: "Put over on straightforward lines, the narrative grips, suspense mounting steadily up to the climax ... Robert Newton splendidly characterises the distraught novelist, Betty Lynne making a charming leading lady. Peter Gawthorne and John Warwick are in form as the crooks in the case, and Aubrey Mallalieu does a good job as a testy coroner."

The Leicester Daily Mercury wrote: "Fast moving action, a goodly sequence of thrills, and some splendid acting by Robert Newton, characterises Dead Men are Dangerous, a film with a clever plot and a strong taste of the mysterious".
