= On Secret Service =

1933 film by Arthur B. Woods

- American film poster
- Directed by: Arthur B. Woods
- Screenplay by: Frank Vosper; Arthur B. Woods
- Based on: Spies at Work; Herbert Juttke (screenplay); Georg C. Klaren (novel); Max W. Kimmich (novel); Robert Baberske (novel)
- Produced by: John Maxwell; Walter C. Mycroft
- Starring: Karl Ludwig Diehl; Greta Nissen
- Cinematography: Cyril Bristow; Jack Parker
- Edited by: Edward B. Jarvis
- Music by: Giuseppe Becce; Kurt Schröder
- Color process: Black and white
- Production company: British International Pictures
- Distributed by: Wardour Films; First Division Pictures (US)
- Release date: 15 December 1933
- Running time: 89 minutes
- Country: United Kingdom
- Language: English

On Secret Service is a 1933 British thriller film directed by Arthur B. Woods and starring Greta Nissen, Karl Ludwig Diehl, Don Alvarado, and Austin Trevor. It was produced by British International Pictures. It is based on the 1933 German film Spies at Work with Karl Ludwig Diehl repeating his role from that film. On Secret Service premiered in London on 15 December 1933 and was theatrically released on 21 May 1934. In the United States, the film was released on 9 February 1936 as Spy 77.

The film was shot at Elstree Studios with sets designed by the art director Duncan Sutherland.

== Plot summary ==
In 1912, the Evidenzbureau, the directorate of military intelligence of the Austro-Hungarian Empire, identifies Marchesa Marcella Galdi, an Italian noblewoman who is visiting Vienna, as an Italian spy. To avoid diplomatic confusion, she is kidnapped while dancing with Austro-Hungarian General Staff Captain Michael von Homberg at a ball held at the famous Hotel Sacher in Vienna, and sent back to Italy. Shortly afterwards, a secret plan of an Austrian fortress appears on von Homberg's office desk, and as he himself is unable to explain this, the Evidenzbureau urges him to commit suicide, but he instead manages to escape from Vienna and goes on the run.

Three years later, Italy and Austria stand against each other in World War I. Returning to Vienna, von Homberg asks his former superiors for a chance to clear his name, and is given a Royal Italian Army uniform and tasked with flying to Italy to find the traitor who put the plans on his office desk three years ago. After landing in Italy, he gets wounded from Italian artillery, but manages to get to safety before falling unconscious. When he awakes, he discovers that he is in a military hospital and encounters Marcella, who is looking for enemy agents and is shocked upon recognising him. Having fallen in love with von Homberg, she offers him the chance to leave Italy as a free man, but to his disappointment, is unwilling to tell him the name of the agent who cast suspicion on his name. After he recovers, von Hombergk takes a train to Rome, intending to speak with Ermete Davila, an antiques dealer and faithful Austrian agent, and meets a suspicious man named Bluentzli.

Upon arriving in Rome, von Homberg quickly discovers that the traitor he is looking for goes by the code name K 77. After meeting with Davila, he obtains a connection to Marcella's superior, Coloneilo Romanelli, chief of the Italian counterintelligence, through one of Davila's regular customers, Conte Valenti, a well-known collector of valuable artworks and a friend of Romanelli. Von Homberg meets Marcella again during a dinner party at Romanelli's villa, but she does not reveal his identity and the two spend the night together, despite her refusal to name the traitor sought after by von Homberg.

When Romanelli suddenly appears, Marcella manages to hide von Homberg, and he overhears them saying that K 77 will arrive shortly from Vienna. As Romanelli does not know the man personally, he orders Marcella to introduce them to each other at an upcoming party held by Conte Valenti. Von Homberg manages to return to his hotel room without being discovered, but finds Bluentzli waiting for him, who proceeds to blackmail him with knowledge of his affair with Marcella. After a lengthy discussion, von Homberg instead convinces Bluentzli to switch allegiances and work for the Austrians.

Wíth the aid of Bluentzli, von Homberg arranges to pilot the aircraft which will fly K 77, who he discovers is a high-ranking Austro-Hungarian General Staff officer of Italian origin, back to Austria. When Marcella gets wind of his plans, she tries to stop him, but her effort ends in spectacular disaster as the plane takes off. After a risky flight, von Homberg successfully hands over the traitor to the Austrian authorities. With his name cleared, von Homberg is finally reinstated into the Austro-Hungarian General Staff, but ruefully remembers Marcella as he reports for military service.

== Cast ==
- Karl Ludwig Diehl as Captain Michael von Homberg
- Greta Nissen as Marchesa Marcella Galdi
- Don Alvarado as Conte Valenti
- Lester Matthews as Coloneilo Romanelli
- Esmé Percy as Bluentzli
- C. M. Hallard as Colonel von Waldmūller
- Austin Trevor as Adjutant Larco
- Cecil Ramage as Ermete Davila
- Wallace Geoffrey as B-18
- Arthur Goullet as Passport Inspector
- Ernest Jay as Hospital Patient
- Andreas Malandrinos as Innkeeper
- James Raglan as Captain Valdo
- Robert Rietti as Boy

== Additional information ==
The film was first shown to the public on 15 December 1933 in London cinemas. It was a remake of the German movie Spies at Work which had had its debut nine months earlier in Berlin. The film was released in the United States under the title Spy 77 on 9 February 1936. By this time, the German original had been banned from the screens, as with many films produced in Germany under the Weimar Republic.

== Bibliography ==
- Klaus, Ulrich J: German soundfilms. Encyclopedia of full-length German-speaking films (1929–1945), Vol. 4 (1933) – Berlin [et al.] : 1933.
