= Betty Lynne =

British actress (1911–2011)

- Born: 16 May 1911; Berlin, German Empire
- Died: 2 March 2011 (aged 99); Mézin, Lot-et-Garonne, France
- Occupation: Actress
- Years active: 1937-1974 (film & TV)

Betty Lynne (1911–2011) was a British film actress. During the late 1930s she played the female lead in a number of quota quickies, several of them for Warner Bros. at Teddington Studios. In 1939 she co-starred with Robert Newton in the thriller Dead Men are Dangerous.

Lynne was educated at Godwin Girls College in England, a convent in France, and the Royal Academy of Dramatic Art in London. She appeared on Broadway in The Animal Kingdom (1932) and Escape Me Never (1935).

== Selected filmography ==
- Take It from Me (1937)
- Saturday Night Revue (1937)
- French Leave (1937)
- Patricia Gets Her Man (1937)
- It's Not Cricket (1937)
- Mr. Satan (1938)
- The Viper (1938)
- Wanted by Scotland Yard (1938)
- Glamour Girl (1938)
- Dead Men are Dangerous (1939)
- That's the Ticket (1940)
- Portrait from Life (1948)
- Once Upon a Dream (1949)
- The Bad Lord Byron (1949)

== Bibliography ==
- Goble, Alan. The Complete Index to Literary Sources in Film. Walter de Gruyter, 1999.
