= Mayfair Melody =

1937 film by Arthur B. Woods

- Scenes from the film in a Kine Weekly feature (25 February 1937)
- Directed by: Arthur B. Woods
- Written by: James Dyrenforth
- Produced by: Irving Asher
- Starring: Keith Falkner; Chili Bouchier
- Cinematography: Basil Emmott
- Music by: Kenneth Leslie-Smith
- Production company: Warner Brothers-First National Productions
- Distributed by: Warner Brothers
- Release date: 2 March 1937
- Running time: 83 minutes
- Country: United Kingdom
- Language: English

Mayfair Melody is a 1937 British musical film, directed by Arthur B. Woods and starring Keith Falkner and Chili Bouchier. It was written by James Dyrenforth and produced as a quota quickie at Teddington Studios by the British subsidiary of Warner Brothers.

== Preservation status ==
The British Film Institute has classed Mayfair Melody as a lost film. Its National Archive holds a collection of ephemera but no film or video materials.

== Plot ==
Mark is a motor mechanic whose exceptional singing voice is discovered by Carmen, the daughter of the factory owner. She helps him rise to fame and fortune as a professional operatic singer.

== Cast ==
- Keith Falkner as Mark
- Chili Bouchier as Carmen
- Bruce Lester as Dickie
- Joyce Kirby as Brenda
- Glen Alyn as Daphne
- Aubrey Mallalieu as Dighton
- George Galleon as Lord Chester
- Louis Goodrich as Ludborough
- Ian McLean as Collecchi
- Vivienne Chatterton as Mme. Collecchi

== Reception ==
The Monthly Film Bulletin wrote: "A silly story around which is woven plenty of broad comedy. Keith Falkner, with faultless speech, never suggests the faintest impression of a mechanic; but his voice – probably the best baritone in England – records gloriously. Joyce Kirby gives a display of temperament akin to Carole Lombard's performance in My Man Godfrey; and her affectations are usually successful. The rest of the cast is good. Jan Maclean makes a perfect Italian Maestro. Amusing entertainment, even if it is somewhat too long."

Kine Weekly wrote: "A romantic comedy with tuneful song and effective dance ensembles that scores principally on its shy, disarming reticence. It is some little time in coming out of its shell, for the preliminaries are protracted, but once it does it provides light entertainment of refreshing ingenuousness. Joyce Kirby is really clever as the heroine; Keith Falkner, although obviously lacking in screen experience, sings delightfully as the hero... The show lacks nothing in stagecraft, the musical ensembles that decorate the ending are artistically and ingeniously contrived, nor is bright repartee absent from the dialogue."

The Daily Film Renter wrote: "Keith Falkner makes interesting debut as baritone hero, Joyce Kirby cleverly burlesquing empty-headed ingenue leading role. Production values are first-class, settings including Covent Garden Opera House, mansion and theatre backgrounds. Finale takes form of spectacular stage scenas, complete with attractive chorine ensembles, dance routines and tuneful song numbers. Good popular entertainment."

Picturegoer wrote: "Simple romantic picture, which has the charm of ingeniousness and is decorated with some tuneful singing, pleasing dance ensembles, and quite an artistic stage finale ... The picture is slow in getting into its stride, but, once that is achieved, it progresses quite entertainingly."
