= The Return of Carol Deane =

1938 film by Arthur B. Woods

- Trade advertisement, The Daily Film Renter (12 August 1938)
- Directed by: Arthur B. Woods
- Written by: Paul Gangelin; John Meehan Jr. Tom Phipps; Joseph Santley
- Produced by: Jerome Jackson
- Starring: Bebe Daniels; Arthur Margetson; Peter Coke
- Cinematography: Basil Emmott
- Edited by: Bert Bates
- Music by: Bretton Byrd
- Distributed by: Warner Brothers-First National Productions
- Release date: 16 August 1938
- Running time: 76 minutes
- Country: United Kingdom
- Language: English

The Return of Carol Deane is a 1938 British drama film directed by Arthur B. Woods and starring Bebe Daniels, Arthur Margetson and Peter Coke. It was written by Paul Gangelin, John Meehan Jr. and Tom Phipps adapted from the story The House on 56th Street by Joseph Santley, and spans the time period from the 1910s to the 1930s.

== Plot ==
In the London of 1912, Carol Deane becomes famous for a portrait of her painted by artist Mark Poynton, who is infatuated with her. Carol however marries Lord Robert Brenning, much to the chagrin of Poynton. She gives birth to a son then with the outbreak of World War I, Lord Robert goes off to fight on the Western Front while Carol becomes a nurse. Poynton is admitted as a patient to Carol's hospital, and tells her he is still in love with her. Carol tries to make light of his persistence, but after being released Poynton calls her to insist that she come to see him, threatening that if she does not, he will make her the subject of a public scandal. Carol goes to visit Poynton, who pulls a gun on her, demanding that she return to live with him. There is a struggle, during which Carol accidentally shoots Poynton dead.

Carol goes on trial for murder and Lord Robert is summoned as a character witness, but is killed in action before the trial begins. Carol is found not guilty of murder but guilty of manslaughter, and is sentenced to a lengthy term of imprisonment. Her son grows up knowing nothing of his mother or her crime, and on her release in the late 1920s Carol relocates to New York. She meets Englishman Francis Scott-Vaughan and becomes involved in his shady gambling businesses. Ten years later the pair return to England to set up a similar establishment in London. On the opening evening she recognises one of the punters as her son, now married and whose photographs she has seen in newspapers. He has the air of a compulsive gambler, and Carol engineers proceedings to prevent him from losing large sums of money in wagers. She takes him under her wing and helps him repair his relationship with his wife, who had been aghast to discover his gambling habits. Carol never reveals that she is his mother, and soon contact between them is lost again.

== Cast ==
- Bebe Daniels as Carol Deane
- Arthur Margetson as Mark Poynton
- Peter Coke as Lord David Brenning
- Michael Drake as Lord Robert Brenning
- Zena Dare as Lady Brenning
- Chili Bouchier as Anne Dempster
- David Burns as Nick Wellington
- Aubrey Mallalieu as Lamont
- Wyndham Goldie as Francis Scott-Vaughan
- Lesley Brook as Diana
- Ian McLean as Prosecution

== Production ==
The film was made at Teddington Studios by the British subsidiary of Warner Brothers. The film's sets were designed by the art director Peter Proud.

== Reception ==
The Monthly Film Bulletin wrote: "The transformation of the feckless youthful Carol Deane into the hardened gambler is hard to believe, and Bebe Daniels' rather listless performance does not even begin to make it convincing. Wyndham Goldie almost makes a character of Vaughan, Carol's partner at the roulette tables. For an undistinguished film the trial at the Old Bailey is extraordinarily well done."

Kine Weekly wrote: "Cause and effect are too artificial for the play to acquire vital flesh-and-blood appeal. There is no emotional resilience. Still, although the drama fails to impress tremendously as a whole, it has its moments – the trial scene is poignant, and so is the meeting between mother and son. These transient moments of tender sentiment enable it occasionally to transcend its otherwise novelettish make-up. No fault can be found with the presentation: atmosphere is faithful to period at all times."

The Daily Film Renter wrote: "Story lacks conviction, but packs emotional wallop calculated to please requisite audiences. Bebe Daniels acts smoothly, while David Burns tops supporting cast. Agreeably set in wide variety of backgrounds, should prove entertainment for 'human interest' patrons, with hokum angles major selling asset."
