= French Leave (1937 film) =

- Betty Lynne and John Longden in the film.
- Directed by: Norman Lee
- Written by: Reginald Berkeley (play); Vernon Clancey
- Produced by: Warwick Ward
- Starring: Betty Lynne; Edmund Breon; John Longden
- Cinematography: Bryan Langley
- Music by: Sydney Baynes
- Production company: Welwyn Studios
- Distributed by: Pathé Pictures
- Release date: 17 June 1937
- Running time: 86 minutes
- Country: United Kingdom
- Language: English

French Leave is a 1937 British comedy film directed by Norman Lee and starring Betty Lynne, Edmund Breon and John Longden. It was wriien by Vernon Clancey based on the 1920 play by Reginald Berkeley which had previously been made into a film of the same title in 1930. It was made at Welwyn Studios.

== Plot ==
Captain Glenister is serving in Flanders, and his wife travels to be near him, pretending to be just his "friend". But Glenister's comrades General Root, Lieutenant Graham – among others – fall in love with her. When the brigade is warned of a spy in their midst, the suspicion falls on Dorothy, and to prevent the General arresting her, she visits him in his room, threatening to compromise him. Then the acutal spy is caught, and Dorothy reveals her true identity. The General sends her to Paris, with Glenister as escort.

== Cast ==
- Betty Lynne as Dorothy Glennister
- Edmund Breon as Colonel Root
- John Longden as Lt. Glennister
- John Wickham as Lt. Graham
- Arthur Hambling as Corporal Sykes
- Frederick Burtwell as Nobby
- Michael Morel as Jules Marnier
- Margaret Yarde as Dernaux
- Oliver Wakefield
- The Roosters as themselves

== Reception ==
The Monthly Film Bulletin wrote: "The direction makes full use of amusing situations, although a little more cutting is necessary. Betty Lynne is charming and convincing as Dorothy. John Longden's irate Glenister commands a deserving and chuckling sympathy. General Root, as played by Edward Breon, is a vacant, gay old bird, but it is to be hoped for the sake of the British army, not true to type. Amusing dialogue, good acting and the Roosters' concert party are the main attractions."

Kine Weekly wrote: "The story – wholly cockney in essence – takes the lighter side of the war, and introduces the well-known Roosters in favourite melodies. What small plot there is is concerned with spy machinations behind the lines ... But the comedy aspect of this feature is the only thing that matters. Some of it is pointed, but for the most part the humour consists of obvious Rooster gags."
