= Murder in Reverse =

- Theatrical release poster
- Directed by: Montgomery Tully
- Written by: Montgomery Tully
- Produced by: Louis H. Jackson
- Starring: William Hartnell; Chili Bouchier; Jimmy Hanley
- Cinematography: Ernest Palmer
- Edited by: Eve Catchpole; Douglas Myers
- Music by: Hans May
- Production company: British National Films
- Distributed by: Anglo-American Film Corporation
- Release date: 22 October 1945
- Running time: 80 minutes
- Country: United Kingdom
- Language: English

Murder in Reverse (also styled Murder in Reverse?) (Note: The opening title credits include the question mark. The question mark is important to the plot because the film concludes by posing to a room of eminent lawyers the question of whether a man can be sentenced a second time for a murder for which has already served the prison sentence.) is a 1945 British thriller film directed by Montgomery Tully and starring William Hartnell, Jimmy Hanley and Chili Bouchier. It was written by Tully based on the 1931 story Query by "Seamark" (Austin J. Small).

The plot centres on a London dockworker, who after serving years in prison for a murder that never occurred, is eventually released and sets out to prove his innocence by finding the man he was convicted of killing. When legal technicalities prevent the case from being reopened, he takes revenge himself, committing the very crime for which he had already been punished.

== Plot ==
Tom Masterick, a stevedore in Limehouse, London, is married with a young daughter. He discovers that his wife has been having an affair with a man named Fred Smith. In a fit of rage, Masterick fights Smith in a saloon bar, and the fight spills out onto the streets, leading to a high stakes chase on a docks crane, which ends with Smith falling to his apparent death. Despite no body being found and Masterick 's insistence that he did not commit murder, he is found guilty and sentenced to death, which is later commuted to 15 years in prison, despite his insistence that he saw Smith alive after his apparent death.

Upon his release, Masterick is determined to uncover the truth about Smith’s fate and the events that led to his wrongful imprisonment. He discovers that his wife had disappeared with Smith and that their daughter, Jill, had been adopted by Masterick's close friend and newspaper editor, Sullivan, who had tried unsuccessfully to change public opinion in Masterick's favour during his early incarceration. Sullivan fears that revealing the truth about Masterick's past could hurt Jill, who has no memory of her real parents. Jill, who is in a relationship with junior reporter Peter Rogers, becomes involved in the case and believes Masterick is the victim of a miscarriage of justice, oblivious he is her real father.

Following private investigation, Masterick finds his former wife, now abandoned by Smith and living in poverty. She advises where Smith can be found, but is unsuccessful in her attempt to reconcile with Masterick, who is only driven by his desire for justice and sets out to find Smith.

Masterick finds Smith running a public house and in an act of duplicity, convinces him that he is not out to avenge him. Following a conversation, the two agree to split any compensation that Masterick believes he will receive for his wrongful imprisonment. They visit Crossley, the prosecution barrister at Masterick's trial, now a judge, who is entertaining guests at a dinner party. Masterick explains that there has been a miscarriage of justice, and the victim is alive and well, standing next to him. However, the judge is unwilling to help, citing the passage of time and the legal technicalities surrounding the case.

Frustrated and desperate, Masterick fatally shoots Smith in front of the judge and his guests, seeking revenge for Smith's failure to come forward during the trial. In the epilogue, Sullivan remarks that Masterick cannot be convicted of murder since he already served a prison sentence for it. The killing was, in effect, a "murder in reverse."

== Cast ==
- William Hartnell as Tom Masterick (end-billed as Billy Hartnell)
- Jimmy Hanley as Peter Rogers
- Chili Bouchier as Doris Masterick
- Brefni O'Rorke as Sullivan
- John Slater as Fred Smith
- Dinah Sheridan as Jill Masterick (adult)
- Petula Clark as Jill (child)
- Kynaston Reeves as Crossley King's Counsel
- John Salew as Blake King's Counsel
- Edward Rigby as Spike
- Ben Williams as docker
- Ethel Coleridge as Mrs Green
- Maire O'Neill as Mrs Moore
- Wylie Watson as tailor
- Scott Sanders as landlord of the North Star
- Maudie Edwards as customer
- Cyril Smith as customer
- K. Lung as Sam Wung See
- Paul Ley as interpreter
- May Norton as Mrs Peterson
- Ellis Irving as Detective Sergeant Howell
- Hendry White as Clerk of the Court
- Aubrey Mallalieu as Judge
- Alfred Harris as Foreman of the jury
- Johnny Catcher as American soldier
- Sonny Miller as American soldier
- Ivor Barnard as Woody
- Dick Francis as Police Sergeant
- Peter Gawthorne as one of Crossley's guests
- Geoffrey Denys as one of Crossley's guests
- Cyril Luckham as one of Crossley's guests

== Production ==
The film was shot at Elstree Studios, and on location including Dartmoor prison. It was among the first films directed by Montgomery Tully, who had previously worked on many short films during World War II.

== Release ==
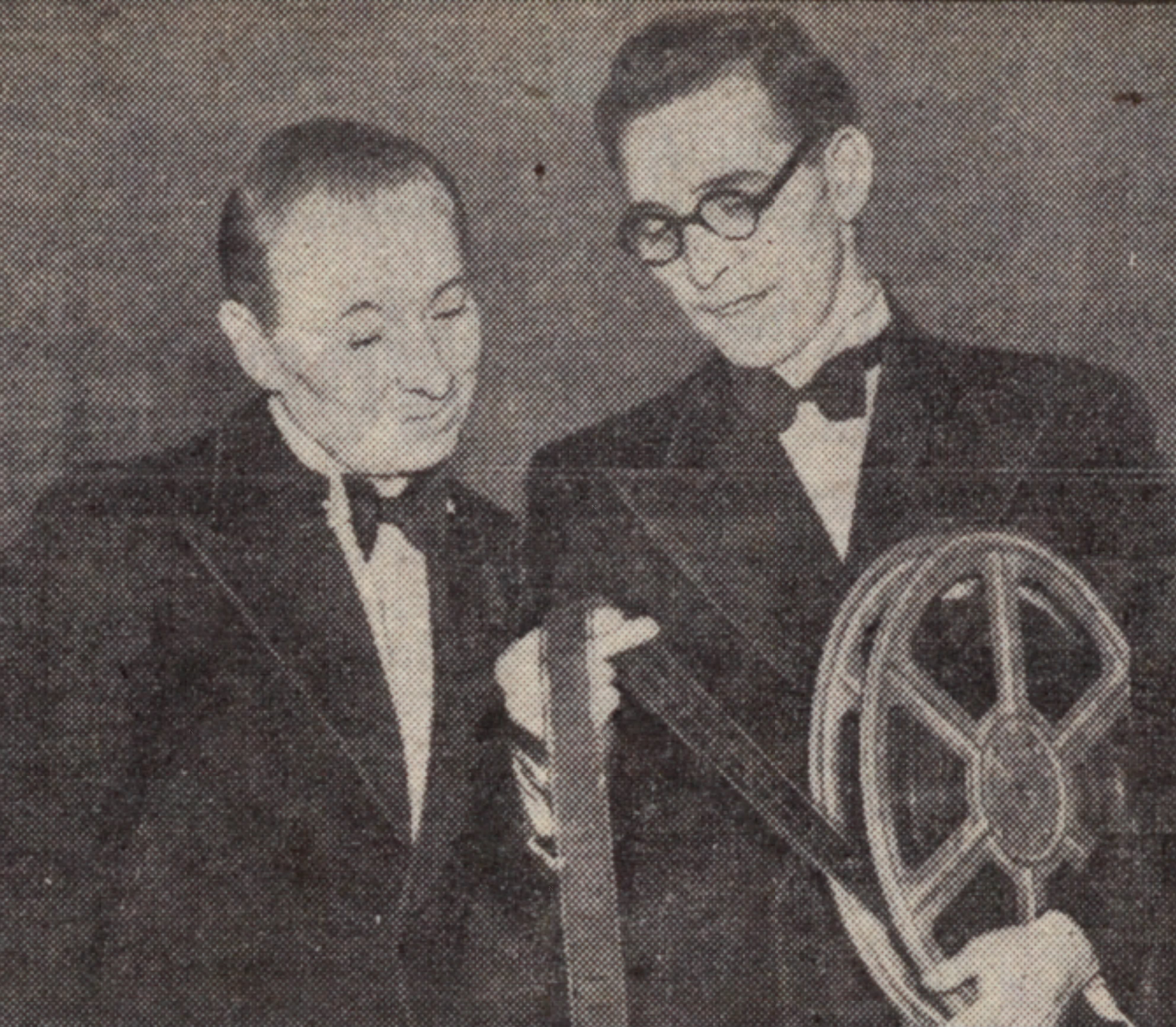
William Hartnell (left) assessing film cuttings with a cinema manager at a showing of the film in Glasgow in October 1945.

The film saw a general cinema release rather than having a West End showing, due to being an independent production. Hartnell made a personal appearance at the film's showing in Glasgow's Regal and Coliseum Cinema in October 1945.

== Reception ==
=== Box office ===
According to trade papers, the film performed well at the British box office in 1945.

=== Critical reception ===
The Monthly Film Bulletin wrote: "Hartnell gives a good performance as Masterick, an essentially decent man whose life is ruined by a silly woman. John Slater, as Fred Smith, and the rest of the cast are efficient in a well-directed and rather unusual thriller."

Reviewing the film in 1949, The Philadelphia Inquirer praised it highly, describing the film as building to "a tricky climax which leaves the audience breathless and virtually able to write its own ending". They particularly highlighted the performances of Hartnell as "extraordinarily good as the betrayed husband", while noted other cast such as Slater, Sheridan and Bouchier as being "excellent".

The Saffron Walden Weekly News also praised the film as an "amazing story", noting that Hartnell gave an "outstanding performance".

The Middlesex Advertiser and County Gazette also praised the film highly, describing it as a "really first-rate adventure yarn filled with vivid characters brought to life by a lengthy cast of experienced British players".

It was considered a "good British film" by the Birmingham Post, who remarked that it was "a change to find a picture which has the courage to treat a serious matter seriously".

Steve Chibnall and Brian McFarlane in The British 'B' Film describe the film as "a well-received, uncompromising thriller."

In British Sound Films: The Studio Years 1928–1959 David Quinlan rates the film as "good", writing: "Harsh, well-directed thriller."

Leslie Halliwell said: "A reasonable crime entertainment of its day which seemed to introduce a new star, but it hasn't worn well."
