= Take It from Me (1937 film) =

1937 film

- Joan Miller and Max Miller in a scene from the film
- Directed by: William Beaudine
- Written by: John Meehan Jr. J.O.C. Orton; Reginald Purdell
- Produced by: Irving Asher
- Starring: Max Miller; Betty Lynne; Buddy Baer
- Cinematography: Basil Emmott
- Production company: Warner Brothers-First National Productions
- Distributed by: First National Film Distributors
- Release date: 22 October 1937
- Running time: 78 minutes
- Country: United Kingdom
- Language: English

Take It from Me (also known as Transatlantic Trouble) is a lost 1937 British comedy film directed by William Beaudine and starring Max Miller, Betty Lynne and Buddy Baer. It was written by John Meehan Jr., J.O.C. Orton and Reginald Purdell.

Ahead of the film's opening in Australia, First National were sued there by a Lady Fairhaven who complained that a character in the film with the same name could be confused for her. The case was settled out of court. First National issued a statement saying: "When Lady Fairhaven's solicitors pointed out that in fact her name was being used in the film, directions were at once given for the making of the necessary alterations in the film."

== Preservation status ==
The British Film Institute has classed Take It from Me as a lost film. Its National Archive holds a collection of ephemera and stills but no film or video materials.

== Plot ==
A British boxing promoter tries to get an opportunity for his man to fight for the title in America.

== Cast ==
- Max Miller as Albert Hall
- Betty Lynne as Lilli Maguet
- Buddy Baer as Kid Brody
- Clem Lawrence as Timber Wood
- Zillah Bateman as Lady Foxham
- James Stephenson as Lewis
- Charlotte Parry as Mrs. Murphy
- Joan Miller as secretary
- Valaida Snow as self
- Victor Rietti as sailor

== Reception ==
Kine Weekly wrote: "Sure-fire comedy fare, presenting star as smart-aleck manager of boxers in series of hilarious adventures om London, Paris, New York and on shipboard with amorous prize-fighters and still more amorous women. The entertainment is slickly put over, and the humour sufficiently varied to appeal to all classes. With stellar credentials and considerable topical interest in the fight game, it should prove an excellent light booking for the majority of halls."

The Daily Film Renter wrote: "Miller's cheeky personality and rapid-fire patter keep fun at concert pitch throughout footage, whether conducting shipboard auction sweep, dallying romantically with French vamp, or indulging in bombastic bluff to extricate himself from tight corners. New York, transatlantic liner, London and Paris figure in attractive locations. Really bright popular entertainment with a laugh all through, which should go well with all audiences."
