= Dangerous Fingers =

Wanted by Scotland Yard
- Trade Show advertisement from The Daily Film Renter (11 December 1937)
- Directed by: Norman Lee
- Written by: Vernon Clancey
- Produced by: John Argyle
- Starring: James Stephenson; Betty Lynne; Leslie Perrins
- Cinematography: Bryan Langley
- Edited by: Ted Richards
- Production company: John Argyle Productions
- Distributed by: Pathé Pictures (UK)
- Release date: 1938
- Running time: 60 minutes
- Country: United Kingdom
- Language: English

Dangerous Fingers (U.S title: Wanted by Scotland Yard) is 1938 British crime film directed by Norman Lee and starring James Stephenson, Betty Lynne and Leslie Perrins. It was written by Vernon Clancey, and made at Welwyn Studios.

== Plot ==
When cracksman Fingers comes out of prison, he intends to go straight, but changes his mind when he learns that his girlfriend Molly has taken her own life. Disbelieving the suicide verdict, he sets out to avenge her death, returning to a life of crime. When he discovers that Standish, whose safe he plans to rob, caused Molly's death, he seeks revenge.

== Cast ==
- James Stephenson as Fingers
- Betty Lynne as Doris
- Leslie Perrins as Standish
- Nadine March as Mabel
- Sally Stewart as Molly
- D. A. Clarke-Smith as Inspector Williams
- George Merritt as Charlie
- Bryan Herbert as Sherlock
- Florence Groves as Maud
- Philip Ray as Ben
- Eric Pavitt as boy

== Reception ==
Kine Weekly wrote: "Romantic crime drama, written with ingenuity, treated directorially with imagination, and staged with a showmanlike regard for the value-of culminating spectacular punch. Dramatic licence is exercised but not abused."

The Daily Film Renter wrote: "Plot stretches long arm of coincidence, and offers quota of quick action born of fugitive's duel with police, and exciting car chase finale. James Stephenson gives polished portrayal as criminal with gift for pianoforte virtuosity, capably supported by Betty Lynne. Robust popular entertainment."
