= My Niece Susanne =

1950 film

- German film poster
- German: Meine Nichte Susanne
- Directed by: Wolfgang Liebeneiner
- Written by: Wolfgang Liebeneiner; Hans Adler (operetta); Alexander Steinbrecher (operetta); Eugène Labiche (play); Philippe Gille (play)
- Produced by: John Olden; Friedrich Pflughaupt
- Starring: Hilde Krahl; Inge Meysel; Harald Paulsen
- Cinematography: Franz Weihmayr
- Edited by: Walter von Bonhorst
- Music by: Hans-Martin Majewski; Alexander Steinbrecher
- Production company: Sphinx-Film
- Distributed by: Herzog Filmverleih
- Release date: 5 May 1950
- Running time: 92 minutes
- Country: West Germany
- Language: German

My Niece Susanne (German: Meine Nichte Susanne) is a 1950 West German musical comedy film directed by Wolfgang Liebeneiner and starring Hilde Krahl, Inge Meysel and Harald Paulsen. It is set in Paris at the beginning of the twentieth century.

== Production ==
It is based on an operetta of the same title written by Hans Adler (based on Eugène Labiche's Les Trente Millions de Gladiator) with music composed by Alexander Steinbrecher. The operetta had previously been made into the unfinished 1945 film Die tolle Susanne by Géza von Bolváry.

It was shot at the Göttingen Studios. The film's sets were designed by the art director Walter Haag.

== Cast ==
- Hilde Krahl as Susanne de Montebello
- Inge Meysel as Blanche, ihre Freundin
- Ingrid Pankow as Nina, ihre Zofe
- Harald Paulsen as Jean
- Gerd Martienzen as Eusebius
- Karl Schönböck as Don Manual Carcocastilla
- Carl-Heinz Schroth as Pedro, sein Diener
- Hans Leibelt as Gratin, Zahnarzt
- Alice Treff as Frau Gratin
- Käte Pontow as Bathilde
- Werner Finck as Dubouton
- Hubert von Meyerinck as Oscar, Friseur
