= Confidential Lady =

1939 British film by Arthur B. Woods

- Ben Lyon (right) in a frame from the film
- Directed by: Arthur B. Woods
- Written by: Derek N. Twist; Brock Williams
- Produced by: Samuel Sax
- Starring: Ben Lyon; Jane Baxter
- Cinematography: Basil Emmott
- Music by: Bretton Byrd
- Distributed by: Warner Bros. First National Productions
- Release date: December 1939
- Running time: 74 minutes
- Country: United Kingdom
- Language: English
- Budget: £17,432
- Box office: £12,822

Confidential Lady is a 1939 British comedy drama film, directed by Arthur B. Woods and starring Ben Lyon and Jane Baxter. It was written by Derek N. Twist and Brock Williams.

== Preservation status ==
The British Film Institute has classed Confidential Lady as a lost film. Its National Archive holds a collection of stills but no film or video materials.

== Plot ==
Jill Trevor vows revenge on newspaper baron Sir Joshua Morple, who she holds responsible for ruining her father. Her very public antics to draw attention to Morple's despicable conduct come to the notice a rival newspaper, who send journalist Jim Brent to offer to write up Jill's story, in the hope that he will be able to dig up some dirt on Morple. Jim is initially sceptical, seeing Jill as a silly attention-seeking airhead, but as he gets to know her he changes his mind and realises there is substance to her claims, so the pair join forces to discredit Morple publicly, at the same time as starting to fall in love with each other.

== Cast ==
- Ben Lyon as Jim Brent
- Jane Baxter as Jill Trevor
- Athole Stewart as Sir Joshua Morple
- Ronald Ward as John Canter
- Jean Cadell as Amy Boswell
- Frederick Burtwell as Phillips
- Gibb McLaughlin as Sheriff
- Vera Bogetti as Rose
- Stewart Rome as Alfred Trevor

== Reception ==
The Monthly Film Bulletin wrote: "This bright and frothy little story has a superabundance of dialogue, the element of suspense is lacking, and action is rather at a discount. But it is put over in exactly the right spirit. Ben Lyon makes a forceful, breezy and hard-boiled reporter. Jane Baxter is an attractive Jill, though she finds it difficult to be convincing as a gold-digger. The supporting cast is excellent, with an especially good performance from Jean Cadell as Jill's old nurse. Production values are good, with effective but unobtrusive backgrounds of luxurious flats and newspaper offices."

The Daily Film Renter wrote: "Dialogue preponderates over action, and denouement is easily foreseen, but Ben Lyon plays reporter hero smoothly, and production values have polish."

Picturegoer wrote: "It is thin material and Jane Baxter hardly suggests a hard-boiled vamp. Ben Lyon is breezy as the reporter and two good performances come from Athole Stewart as a newspaper proprietor who falls for the girl and Jean Cadell as his companion."
