= The Singing Cop (film) =

1938 film by Arthur B. Woods

- Frame from the film, The Daily Film Renter (13 January 1938)
- Directed by: Arthur B. Woods
- Written by: Tom Phipps; Brock Williams
- Produced by: Irving Asher
- Starring: Keith Falkner; Chili Bouchier
- Cinematography: Basil Emmott
- Music by: Benjamin Frankel
- Distributed by: Warner Brothers-First National Productions
- Release date: January 1938
- Running time: 78 minutes
- Country: United Kingdom
- Language: English

The Singing Cop (also known as Music and Mystery) is a 1938 British quota quickie musical comedy spy drama film, directed by Arthur B. Woods and starring singer Keith Falkner and Chili Bouchier. It was written by Tom Phipps and Brock Williams based on a short story by Kenneth Leslie-Smith.

== Preservation status ==
The British Film Institute has classed The Singing Cop as a lost film. Its National Archive holds a collection of ephemera and stills but no film or video materials.

== Plot ==
A temperamental opera diva arouses official suspicion that she is a spy, secretly gathering classified information to pass to enemy agents. A policeman who happens to be a talented amateur singer is sent undercover to join the opera company and try to find out whether there is any substance to the allegations. Once there, an immediate attraction springs up between the policeman and a female member of the company. But the diva also sets her sights on him and, used to getting what she wants, becomes the bitter rival-in-love of the other singer. The policeman lets his lady friend into his confidence, and the pair set about sleuthing. They finally prove that all the suspicions were justified and the diva is indeed a foreign agent.

== Cast ==
- Keith Falkner as Jack Richards
- Chili Bouchier as Kit Fitzwillow
- Marta Labarr as Maria Santova
- Ivy St. Helier as Sonia Kassona
- Athole Stewart as Sir Algernon Fitzwillow
- Bobbie Comber as Bombosa
- Glen Alyn as Bunty Waring
- George Galleon as Drips Foster-Hanley
- Ian McLean as Zabisti
- Vera Bogetti as Rosa
- Frederick Burtwell as Dickie
- Robert Rendel as Sir Treves Hallam
- Brian Buchel as Pemberton
- Derek Gorst as Captain Farquhar
- Covent Garden Chorus of the Royal Opera

== Reception ==
Kine Weekly wrote: "Well-staged operatic sequences, light-hearted humour, pleasant romance, and mild spy-chase thrill ensure sufficient variety of appeal to make the picture a useable programme proposition, with special pull for music lovers. ... There are some deft directorial touches, but not enough to conceal the fact that the characters, as well as the theme and situations, are inherently artificial. The mixture of grand opera and spy melodrama, moreover, does not jell too successfully, while the action, as in most films of this kind, with long musical interludes, is inclined to be slow."

The Monthly Film Bulletin wrote: "This slight story depends chiefly on the music. There are good operatic sequences made under the direction of Percy Heming with the chorus of the Royal Opera House, Covent Garden. Direction and acting are adequate, but the film will be entertaining chiefly to music lovers."

The Daily Film Renter wrote: "The action is rather slow, and seems to lack sufficient bright dialogue – but the stage settings for Faust are particularly good, and Keith Falkner and Marta Labarr, who almost, needless to say, play Mephistopheles and Marguerita, are in fine singing voice. It is a neat effort, although not perhaps outstanding, but its production values are good."

Picturegoer wrote: "Its thin plot is a mixture of music and melodrama which does not jell very well. Excerpts from Faust are well staged. Keith Falkner sings better than he acts as the hero and Chili Bouchier does her best with the none too fat part of a bright young thing. Marta La Barr is excellent as the opera singer."

Picture Show wrote: "This is a quite entertaining mixture of musical comedy, spy melodrama and grand opera. Although it has little pretence to reality, the music and comedy are good, and Keith Falkner's excellent voice is heard to advantage."
