= Ian McLean (actor) =

English actor (1887–1978)

- 1939 Spotlight photo
- Born: 7 December 1887; Greenwich, Kent, England
- Died: 1978 (aged 90–91); East Sussex, England
- Other name: Ian Maclea
- Occupation: Actor
- Years active: 1935-1949 (film)

Ian McLean (7 December 1887 – 1978) was an English stage and film actor. He is sometimes credited as Ian Maclean. He played supporting roles in around thirty British films, frequently playing police officers.

== Partial filmography ==
- Brewster's Millions (1935) - McLeod
- Jack of All Trades (1936) - The Fire Raiser
- Mayfair Melody (1937) - Collecchi
- The Street Singer (1937) - Police Inspector
- The Singing Cop (1938) - Zabisti
- Thistledown (1938) - Rossini
- Simply Terrific (1938) - Foster
- Thank Evans (1938) - (uncredited)
- The Return of Carol Deane (1938) - Prosecution
- Marigold (1938) - James Paton
- Quiet Please - Woods
- Too Dangerous to Live (1939) - Saunders
- The Nursemaid Who Disappeared (1939) - Inspector Pike
- Murder Will Out (1939) - Inspector
- The Arsenal Stadium Mystery (1939) - Sgt. Clinton
- That's the Ticket (1940) - Hercule
- Two for Danger (1940) - Australian
- Sailors Don't Care (1940) - First C.I.D. Man
- Atlantic Ferry (1941) - Capt. Woodruff
- The Young Mr. Pitt (1942) - Dundas
- Headline (1943) - Inspector Dodds
- The Shipbuilders (1943)
- Dreaming (1944) - British General
- The World Owes Me a Living (1945) - Air Minister (uncredited)
- Twilight Hour (1945) - Hemingway
- Here Comes the Sun (1946) - Counsel for the Prosecution
- Appointment with Crime (1946) - Det. Mason
- Calling Paul Temple (1948) - Inspector Crane
- The Story of Shirley Yorke (1948) - Dr. Harris
- Floodtide (1949) - Sir John (final film role)

== Bibliography ==
- Mayer, Geoff. Historical Dictionary of Crime Films. Scarecrow Press, 2012.
