= Jack of All Trades (1936 film) =

- Directed by: Robert Stevenson; Jack Hulbert
- Written by: Jack Hulbert; Austin Melford; J. O. C. Orton
- Based on: play by Paul Vulpius
- Produced by: Michael Balcon
- Starring: Jack Hulbert; Gina Malo; Robertson Hare
- Cinematography: Charles Van Enger
- Edited by: Terence Fisher
- Music by: Bretton Byrd; Louis Levy
- Production company: Gainsborough Pictures
- Distributed by: Gaumont British Distributors
- Release date: 30 December 1936
- Running time: 76 minutes
- Country: United Kingdom
- Language: English

Jack of All Trades (also known as The Two of Us) is a 1936 British comedy film directed by Robert Stevenson and Jack Hulbert and starring Hulbert, Gina Malo and Robertson Hare. It was written by Hulbert, Austin Melford and J. O. C. Orton based on the 1934 play Youth at the Helm by Paul Vulpius. The film was made at Islington Studios, with sets designed by Alex Vetchinsky.

== Plot ==
Jack Warrender, out of work and responsible for an aged mother, takes a succession of jobs, bluffing his way through them all.

== Cast ==
- Jack Hulbert as Jack Warrender
- Gina Malo as Frances Wilson
- Robertson Hare as Lionel Fitch
- Mary Jerrold as Mrs Warrender
- Cecil Parker as Sir Chas Darrington
- Athole Stewart as bank Chairman
- Felix Aylmer as Managing Director
- Ian McLean as the fire raiser
- H. F. Maltby as bank Director
- Fewlass Llewellyn as bank Director
- Marcus Barron as Williams
- C. M. Hallard as Henry Kilner
- Peggy Simpson as typist
- Betty Astell as dancer
- Arnold Bell
- Harry Crocker
- Henry B. Longhurst as party guest
- Frederick Piper as Jimmy, employment clerk
- Victor Rietti as head waiter
- Bruce Seton as dancer
- Cyril Smith
- Netta Westcott

== Critical reception ==
The Monthly Film Bulletin wrote: "The first half of the film ... is good, in the true Hulbert tradition; but the rest is patchy and rather disappointing ... Jack Hulbert acts, dances and sings as usual in a part which gives him less opportunities than usual. Robertson Hare is delightful when drunk and bellicose, and Gina Malo is a competent leading lady."

Kine Weekly wrote: "Bright, cheery comedy of big business, backed up by music and song and crowned with excellent slapstick. The story is a made-to-measure vehicle for Jack Hulbert, and the chance to see him dance again will make the film doubly welcome with his fans. The support is worthy of the star, while the picture's technical craftsmanship, illustrated in the handling of the clever knockabout ending, is equal to the best. Great fun from beginning to end, this farce can be depended upon to hand out the laughs wherever it is shown."

Writing for The Spectator in 1936, Graham Greene gave the film a mildly negative review. After giving high praise to the board meeting scene in the first half of the film, and describing it as an "excellent sequence" of "pointed fooling", Greene comments that the remainder of the film "degenerates into nothing but [...] an awful eternal disembodied Cheeriness".
