= Youth at the Helm =

Hungarian-language play by Paul Vulpius

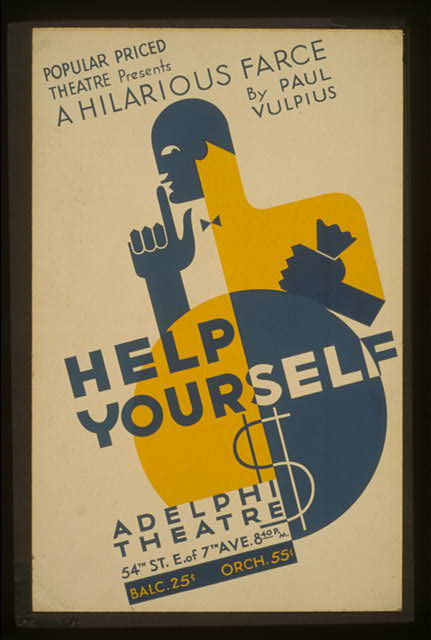
This is a poster for the 1936 playHelp Yourself which was produced on Broadway by the Works Project Administration during the Great Depression.

Youth at the Helm (Hungarian: Helyet az ifjúságnak) is a Hungarian-language play by Paul Vulpius, the joint pen name of Ladislas Fodor and László Lakatos, which premiered in Budapest in 1933. The play was also staged in Vienna, Austria in 1933 under the title Hau-ruck using a German language translation of Fodor and Lakatos's play by Hans Adler who also adopted the pen name Paul Vulpius. Adler's German language translation was the source material for two different English language translations of the play: Youth At the Helm by Hubert Griffith (1896–1953), used frequently in the United Kingdom during the 1930s, and Help Yourself by John J. Coman for the work's Broadway production in 1936. The play has also been staged using the titles Jugend voran (Germany) and L'affare Kubinsky (Italy). The play served as the basis for the 1936 film Jack of All Trades starring Jack Hulbert.

== Griffith's English-language adaptation ==
The play was first performed in the English language under the title Youth at the Helm in an adaptation of Adler's play made by Herbert Griffith at the Westminster Theatre in London from November 5, 1934 to November 19, 1934. Produced by Harold French and Community Theaters, Ltd., the cast included Jack Melford as Randolph Warrender, David Bird as Fitch, Townsend Whitling as William, Vera Lennox as Dorothy Wilson, Marcus Barron as the Old Gentleman, O. B. Clarence as the Chairman, Alastair Sim as Ponsonby, Margery Morris as Yvonne, Walter Horsbrugh as Nicholson, Hamlyn Benson as Hollman, C. M. Hallard as Lord Farley, George Weir as Roberts, and Fred Royal as the Office Boy.

A critical success, Griffith's adaptation was staged several more times in the United Kingdom in the 1930s. It was performed for two weeks of tryout performances at the New Theatre Oxford before transferring to the Globe Theatre in London on February 28, 1935. This production was produced by Howard & Wyndham Ltd with Owen Nares as Randolph Warrender, Walter Hudd as Fitch, Kay Hammond as Dorothy Wilson, Adele Dixon as Yvonne, and with O. B. Clarence, Alastair Sim, and Fred Royal reprising their roles. The production ran at the Globe for three months, ending its run on May 25, 1935. The production then went on tour the following June for performances at the Golders Green Hippodrome and thee Streatham Hill Theatre. The Liverpool Playhouse staged the work in August–September 1935 with Michael Redgrave as Randolph Warrender and Jane Baxter as Dorothy Wilson.

Other UK theatres to stage Griffith's version included the Devonshire Park Theatre (1935), the Brighton Palace Pier (1935), the Edinburgh Festival Theatre (1935), the Tyne Theatre and Opera House (1935), the Grand Theatre, Leeds (1935), the Prince of Wales Theatre, Birmingham (1935), the Royal Theatre, Northampton (1936), the Royal Theatre, Huddersfield (1936), the Morecambe Winter Gardens (1936), the Little Theatre, Bristol (1936, 1939), The Prince's Theatre, Bradford (1939), and the Oxford Playhouse (1939). The United States premiere of Griffith's version was presented at the Surry Theatre in Maine from August 10–14, 1937.

Griffith's version was adapted into a film entitled Jack of All Trades by screenwriter J. O. C. Orton. The film premiered in London on February 18, 1936. The film renamed the main character Randolph to Jack Warrender who was portrayed by Jack Hulbert.

== 1936 Broadway production: Help Yourself ==
In 1936 the Federal Theatre Project (FTP) of the Works Progress Administration of the United States government produced the play on Broadway using a new English-language adaptation by John J. Coman based on Adler's German-language adaptation from the Vienna production. Staged by Lucius Moore Cook and designed by Tom Adrian Cracraft, the production premiered at the Manhattan Theater on July 14, 1936 with a cast that included Curt Bois as Christopher Stringer, Walter Burke as Frederick Bittlesby, Doan Borup as Nicholas B. Bradley, and Camelia Campbell as Peggy Danforth. The play moved to Maxine Elliott's Theatre and then the Adelphi Theatre. In 1937 the FTP took the play on a national tour, with performances given at the Hollywood Playhouse, the Musart Theatre in Los Angeles, the Plaza Theatre in Palm Springs, the Copley Theatre in Boston, Mountain Park in Holyoke, Massachusetts, the Empire Theatre in Salem, Massachusetts, the San Jose Civic Auditorium, the Santa Maria High School Auditorium, the University of California, Berkeley’s Campus Theatre, Minski's Columbia Theatre in San Francisco, the President Theatre in Des Moines, Iowa, and the Warburton Theatre in Yonkers, New York.

== Film versions ==
- 1935: Lärm um Weidemann, directed by Johann Alexander Hübler-Kahla
- 1936: Jack of All Trades, directed by Robert Stevenson and Jack Hulbert
- 1940: La danza dei milioni, directed by Camillo Mastrocinque
- 1953: Drei, von denen man spricht, directed by Axel von Ambesser

== Inside Trading ==
In 1996 Malcolm Bradbury wrote the play Inside Trading, a modern version of Youth at the Helm.

== Bibliography ==
- Goble, Alan (1999). The complete index to literary sources in film. London: Walter de Gruyter. ISBN 978-3-11-095194-3. OCLC 868959494.
