= The Wallet (film) =

1952 film

- Trade advertisement
- Directed by: Morton M. Lewis
- Written by: Ted Willis.
- Produced by: Morton M. Lewis
- Starring: John Longden; Chili Bouchier; Hilda Fenemore
- Cinematography: Brendan J. Stafford
- Edited by: Denis Kavanagh
- Music by: John Bath
- Production company: Morton M. Lewis Productions
- Distributed by: Archway Film Distributors
- Release date: March 1952
- Running time: 64 minutes
- Country: United Kingdom
- Language: English

The Wallet (U.S. title Blueprint for Danger) is a 1952 British crime film directed by Morton Lewis and starring John Longden, Chili Bouchier and Roberta Huby. It was written by Ted Willis, and was produced as a second feature for release on a double bill.

== Preservation status ==
The British Film Institute National Archive holds no stills or ephemera, and no film or video materials.

== Plot ==
During a fight on a train between police and enemy agents, a wallet containing £100 and valuable papers is thrown out of a window It then passes through the hands of three people: a dancer trying escape from a disreputable club, a crooked cashier, and a blackmailer. A mysterious pipe-smoking stranger follows the wallet's trail, obtains it, and is then arrested.

== Cast ==
- John Longden as man with pipe
- Chili Bouchier as Babs
- Roberta Huby as Dot Johnson
- Alfred Farrell as Harry Maythorpe
- Hilda Fenemore as Alice Maythorpe
- Diana Calderwood as May Jenkins

== Reception ==
The Monthly Film Bulletin wrote: "A film which recalls the days of quota quickie production; script, direction and acting are all quite deplorable."

Kine Weekly wrote: "Magazine melodrama, illustrating life on London's seamy side. Three stories are blended into one and the culminating chapter underlines the adage, 'crime does not pay.' The acting is a trifle uneven and the edges are a bit rough, but the novel central idea easily offsets histrionic and technical shortcomings. A quart in a pint pot, it carrieg quite a kick and gives good value for money."

The Daily Film Renter wrote: "Modestly staged, this British quota feature ... is acted forthrightly, packs semi-melodramatic situations, culminating action, and good human appeal into its unfolding. The scripting conveys a sense of individual characterisation, rather than stock types. Characters' intentions are not made too transparent."
