= Mr. Satan (film) =

1938 film by Arthur B. Woods

- Richard "Skeets" Gallagher in the film (feature in The Daily Film Renter, 1 January 1938)
- Directed by: Arthur B. Woods
- Written by: John Meehan Jr. J. O. C. Orton
- Produced by: William Collier
- Starring: James Stephenson; Chili Bouchier
- Cinematography: Robert La Presle
- Edited by: Terence Fisher
- Distributed by: Warner Brothers-First National Productions
- Release date: February 1938
- Running time: 79 minutes
- Country: United Kingdom
- Language: English

Mr. Satan is a 1938 British spy thriller, directed by Arthur B. Woods and starring James Stephenson and Chili Bouchier. It was written by John Meehan Jr. and J. O. C. Orton. Unlike a majority of Woods' quota quickie productions of the 1930s which are believed lost, this film survives in the British Film Institute National Archive.

== Plot ==
News correspondent Tim Garnett and his photographer Connelly have been on assignment in a country on the edge of revolution. At the airport as they wait to leave, Connelly snaps a throwaway shot of an attractive woman boarding a plane. When the photograph is developed, they realise that the woman's male companion is Emile Zubova, a notorious illegal arms dealer who had recently been reported as having committed suicide while on the run from agents wishing to track him down.

Connelly and Garnett start to investigate their scoop, but as they do so word gets back to Zubova that he has been photographed. Connelly and Garnett manage to identify the woman in the picture, Jacqueline Manet, and trace her movements to France. As they fly out, Zubova arranges to have their plane shot down in order to silence them. The plane crashes, but both survive relatively unscathed. Garnett locates Jacqueline and follows her, hoping she will lead him to Zubova. She realises she is being tailed and challenges Garnett. However the confrontation soon turns into mutual attraction and then love.

Having been informed of the dangerous situation by his lookout minions, Zubova has Garnett kidnapped and brought to his hideout, where plans are being made to torpedo an ocean liner in order to provoke another war from which Zubova can profit. Jacqueline arrives at the hideout and shoots Zubova during a struggle, but is herself fatally wounded in return and dies in Garnett's arms. Garnett is able to alert the authorities of the plot to sink the liner, the navy are put on hand to deal with the threat, and the submarine is destroyed.

== Cast ==
- James Stephenson as Tim Garnett
- Chili Bouchier as Jacqueline Manet
- Richard "Skeets" Gallagher as Connelly
- Franklin Dyall as Emile Zubova
- Betty Lynne as Conchita
- Mary Cole as Billie
- Robert Rendel as Seymour
- Patricia Medina as Maria

== Reception ==
The Monthly Film Bulletin wrote: "This is an excellent film, moving fast but smoothly to a climax of dramatic suspense. The dialogue is neat and quick, with touches of humour well exploited by Skeets Gallagher. The direction, competent and unobtrusive, brings out the engaging personality of James Stephenson in the main part, and Chili Bouchier and Franklin Dyall contribute excellent performances. The theme has an obvious inspiration in the current Spanish troubles, but there is no propaganda. Very good entertainment of its kind."

The Daily Film Renter wrote: "Somewhat far-fetched plot, while dialogue is banal, but finale has thrilling sequence depicting sinking of pirate submarine by destroyer flotilla. Piquant romantic angles see hero and heroine on opposing sides, and settings are of ornate type. Reasonably reliable popular entertainment."

Kine Weekly wrote: "The producer is somewhat dilatory in his handling of the romantic interludes, artificial dialogue is allowed to get the upper hand, but his treatment of spectacle is masterly. A plane crash and the frustrating of an attempt to torpedo a giant liner are but a few of the gargantuan thrills. ... Mass appeal is vigorousy indicated."
