= Athole Stewart =

British stage and film actor (1879–1940)

- 1939 Spotlight photo
- Born: Athole Chalmers Stewart; 25 June 1879; Ealing, London, England
- Died: 18 October 1940 (aged 61); Leighton Buzzard, Bedfordshire, England
- Resting place: Churchyard of St Mary the Virgin, Ivinghoe, Buckinghamshire
- Years active: 1925–1940

Athole Chalmers Stewart (25 June 1879 – 18 October 1940) was a British stage and latterly film actor, often in authoritarian or aristocratic roles.

On stage, he played in the original production of Noël Coward's Hay Fever at the Ambassadors Theatre, London, in 1925. On film, he played Dr. Watson to Raymond Massey's Holmes in The Speckled Band, in 1931.

Athole is buried in the Churchyard of St Mary the Virgin, Ivinghoe in Buckinghamshire alongside his wife Ellen Frances Stewart OBE, daughter of the late general William Sparkes Hatch.

== Selected filmography ==
Athole appeared in the following films:

- To What Red Hell (1929)
- Canaries Sometimes Sing (1930)
- The Speckled Band (1931)
- The Faithful Heart (1932)
- Frail Women (1932)
- The Constant Nymph (1933)
- Loyalties (1933)
- The Four Masked Men (1934)
- The Path of Glory (1934)
- The Clairvoyant (1935)
- While Parents Sleep (1935)
- The Amateur Gentleman (1936)
- The Tenth Man (1936)
- Where's Sally? (1936)
- Dusty Ermine (1936)
- Jack of All Trades (1936)
- Return of a Stranger (1937)
- Doctor Syn (1937)
- Action for Slander (1937)
- The Singing Cop (1938)
- His Lordship Regrets (1938)
- Climbing High (1938)
- Thistledown (1938)
- The Four Just Men (1939)
- I Killed the Count (1939)
- Confidential Lady (1939)
- The Spy in Black (1939)
- Poison Pen (1939)
- They Came by Night (1940)
- Old Mother Riley in Society (1940)
- Tilly of Bloomsbury (1940)
- Meet Maxwell Archer (1940)
- It Happened to One Man (1940)
