= It's Not Cricket (1937 film) =

- Feature in Picture Show (5 June 1937)
- Directed by: Ralph Ince
- Written by: Henry Kendall
- Starring: Claude Hulbert; Henry Kendall; Betty Lynne; Clifford Heatherley
- Distributed by: Warner Bros.
- Release date: March 1937
- Running time: 63 minutes
- Country: United Kingdom
- Language: English

It's Not Cricket is a lost 1937 British comedy film directed by Ralph Ince and starring Claude Hulbert, Henry Kendall, Betty Lynne and Clifford Heatherley. It was written by Kendall, and shot as a quota quickie at Teddington Studios.

== Preservation status ==
The British Film Institute has classed It's Not Cricket as a lost film. Its National Archive holds a collection of ephemera but no film or video materials.

== Plot ==
Yvonne is a Frenchwoman married to Henry, a cricket-mad Englishman. Not sharing his obsession, she feels neglected and flirts with Willie, his best friend. They run off to Paris together, but Willie soon regrets it.

== Cast ==
- Claude Hulbert as Willie
- Henry Kendall as Henry
- Betty Lynne as Yvonne
- Sylvia Marriott as Jane
- Clifford Heatherley as Sir George Harlow
- Violet Farebrother as Lady Harlow
- Frederick Burtwell as Morton

== Reception ==
The Monthly Film Bulletin wrote: "Claude Hulbert conveys the Ralph Lynn attitude to life, and his absent-minded vacuousness provides plenty of laughs. He is well aided by the rest of the male cast, especially by Clifford Heatherley as an elderly bore whose Wisden is his Bible. The young ladies – Betty Lynne, the French wife, and Sylvia Marriott, are no more than adequate. Production is undistinguished. There are some vulgar innuendoes, and the flavour of naughtiness is not always in good taste. A humorous trifle."

Kine Weekly wrote: "Amusing, typically English farcical comedy, the bright native humour of which is vested in the story's crisp definition of the term expressed in the title. There is more talk than action, but the dialogue is good, and so is the characterisation. The fun not only has a homely quality, it strikes home"

The Daily Film Renter wrote: "Unpretentious but amusing comedy trifle depicting hilarious consequences of fatuous Englishman's flirtation with best friend's French wife. Put over mainly in terms of dialogue, development gently satirises British craze for games, and introduces Claude Hulbert in characteristically asinine role. Pleasant light popular support."

Picturegoer wrote: "Rather over-dialogued, there is nevertheless enough humour of an obvious and homely order to keep one quite fairly well entertained. Claude Hulbert is amusing as a cricketer who decides to run away with the wife of his best friend, who considers that her husband neglects her for his sports. The husband is well characterised by Henry Kendall, and Betty Lynne is effective as his wife. A sound performance comes from Clifford Heatherley as the uncle of a girl to whom Claude is engaged."

Picture Show wrote: "Delicious British comedy which gives Claude Hulbert full scope for his own brand of humour. The treatment makes it into hilarious comedy material of which the cast take full advantage. It provides a bright hour's entertainment."
