= Ivy St. Helier =

British stage actress (1886–1971)

Ivy Janet Aitchison (1886 – 8 November 1971) better known as Ivy St. Helier, was a British stage actress, composer and lyricist.

== Early life ==
St. Helier was born in her namesake, Saint Helier, in Jersey.

== Stage ==
On the stage, St. Helier played Manon la Crevette in the original production of Noël Coward's operetta Bitter Sweet (1929), a role she reprised in the 1933 film version. She also starred in Coward's revue Words and Music. As a lyricist, she wrote additional songs for The Street Singer, and for The Blue Train, the London musical by Reginald Arkell, Dion Titheradge and Robert Stolz.

== Film ==
She made five films, including Laurence Olivier's Henry V (1944) and London Belongs to Me (1948).

== Death ==
St. Helier died on 8 November 1971 in London, England.

== Filmography ==
Year	Title	Role	Notes
1933	Bitter Sweet	Manon la Crevette	
1938	The Singing Cop	Sonia Kassona	
1944	Henry V	Alice	
1948	London Belongs to Me	Connie Coke	
1955	The Gold Express	Emma Merton	
