= The Office Wife (1934 film) =

- Cecil Parker and Chili Bouchier in the film
- Directed by: George King
- Written by: Faith Baldwin(novel); Randall Faye
- Produced by: Irving Asher
- Starring: Nora Swinburne; Cecil Parker; Chili Bouchier
- Cinematography: Basil Emmott
- Production company: Warner Brothers
- Distributed by: Warner Brothers
- Release date: 12 November 1934
- Running time: 43 minutes
- Country: United Kingdom
- Language: English

The Office Wife is a lost 1934 British comedy film directed by George King and starring Nora Swinburne, Cecil Parker and Chili Bouchier. It was written by Randall Faye based on the 1929 novel of the same title by Faith Baldwin, and was made as a quota quickie by the British subsidiary of Warner Brothers at their Teddington Studios.

== Preservation status ==
The British Film Institute has classed The Office Wife as a lost film. Its National Archive holds a collection of stills but no film or video materials.

== Plot ==
Wealthy businessman Lawrence Bradley marries Anne, his staid but efficient secretary. When he travels to Amsterdam on business, his new secretary Linda seduces him. Lawrence and Anne divorce, and Lawrence marries Linda, but Anne wins Bradley back.

== Cast ==
- Nora Swinburne as Anne
- Cecil Parker as Lawrence Bradley
- Chili Bouchier as Linda
- Percy Walsh as Simms
- Violet Farebrother as Aunt Cynthia
- Hamilton Keene as Gregory
- Charles Hawtrey

== Reception ==
Kine Weekly wrote: "Matrimonial comedy drama, with a business background, simple, artless entertainment which turns on a few bright situations, frankly spiced with sex. ... Nora Swinburne, although not too well served by the camera, is quite good as Ann, Dorothy Bouchier has all the necessary physical attributes for the role of Linda, and Cecil Parker is sound as the stolid financier. Although the end is in sight immediately the picture opens, and the producer has made no effort to cloak its transparency, it pursues paths which seldom fail to bring simple enjoyment to the masses."

The Daily Film Renter wrote: Climax can be seen early on, thus robbing plot of any suspense values, while indifferent direction fails to infuse much life into trite narrative. Production is well mounted, main interest being vested in charming performance by Nora Swinburne as plain Jane who changes to attractive woman. Second feature booking for the masses."

Picturegoer wrote: "Very obvious development robs this matrimonial comedy drama of much interest. It is adequately produced and soundly acted by a competent cast, but, as a whole, it is very naive and artless."

Picture Show wrote: "Cecil Parker as the business man gives a good performance. Nora Swinburne as the eflicient secretary and wife is effective. Settings and photography are good. Fair entertainment."
