= Aino Bergö =

Swedish actress (1915–1944)

Aino Lillalida Bergö (commonly spelled Aino Bergo in English-language publications) (13 January 1915 – July 1944) was a Swedish ballerina, opera singer and film actress.

== Life ==
Bergo was daughter of Otto Folke Bergö of Goteburg, Sweden, and his wife Hedwig Gulla. She studied ballet in Stockholm. She performed ballet in Berlin and Munich and starred in operettas in Vienna. Bergö starred in the 1936 German film Das Frauenparadies and later relocated to the United Kingdom, where producer Irving Asher helped her land a starring role in Thistledown. In 1938 in Chelsea, London Bergö married Richard Fairey, the eldest son of Sir Charles Richard Fairey, an aircraft manufacturer. They were divorced in 1943.

Bergö was killed in July 1944 at her home in Knightsbridge, London, in a German flying bomb attack in southern England. Her death was registered in Kensington, London. Her services were held at the Swedish Church on Harcourt Street in London.

== Filmography ==
- 1938, Thistledown (Note: the British Film Institute has listed this film as lost)
- 1936, Das Frauenparadies
