= Hans Adler (poet) =

German poet

Hans Adler (1880, in Vienna – 1957) was a German author of humorous poems, many of which appeared in the magazine Simplicissimus and were later collected in the volume Affentheater.

== Works ==
- Das Städtchen (1926, novel)
- Die Nacht vor dem Ultimo (with Rudolf Lothar, 1933, play) - English-language adaptation: The Red Cat
- Hau-ruck (under the pen name "Paul Vulpius", 1933, play) - English-language adaptation: Youth at the Helm
- Die Tänzerin Fanny Elßler (1934, operetta, based on the music of Johann Strauss II)
- Mädchen für alles (with Paul Frank, 1934, play)
- Morgen ist Feiertag (with Leo Perutz and Paul Frank, 1935, play) - English-language adaptation: Tomorrow's a Holiday
- Tohuwabohu (with Alexander Lernet-Holenia, 1936, play)
- Verliebtes Abenteuer (1938, play)
- Meine Nichte Susanne (1942, operetta, with music by Alexander Steinbrecher; based on the play Les Trente Millions de Gladiator by Eugène Labiche and Philippe Gille)
- "Help yourself".

== Filmography ==
- Fanny Elssler, directed by Frederic Zelnik (Germany, 1920, based on the operetta Die Tänzerin Fanny Elßler)
- Folies Bergère de Paris, directed by Roy Del Ruth (1935, based on the play Die Nacht vor dem Ultimo)
- Lärm um Weidemann, directed by Johann Alexander Hübler-Kahla (Germany, 1935, based on the play Hau-ruck) (uncredited)
- Jack of All Trades, directed by Robert Stevenson and Jack Hulbert (UK, 1936, based on the play Hau-ruck)
- Mädchen für alles, directed by Carl Boese (Germany, 1937, based on the play Mädchen für alles)
- Adventure in Love, directed by Hans H. Zerlett (Germany, 1938, based on the play Verliebtes Abenteuer)
- La danza dei milioni, directed by Camillo Mastrocinque (Italy, 1940, based on the play Hau-ruck) (uncredited)
- That Night in Rio, directed by Irving Cummings (1941, based on the play Die Nacht vor dem Ultimo)
- Die tolle Susanne, directed by Géza von Bolváry (Germany, 1945, based on the operetta Meine Nichte Susanne), unfinished film
- Esta é Fina, directed by Luiz de Barros (Brazil, 1948, based on the play Die Nacht vor dem Ultimo)
- My Niece Susanne, directed by Wolfgang Liebeneiner (West Germany, 1950, based on the operetta Meine Nichte Susanne)
- Escándalo nocturno, directed by Juan Carlos Thorry (Argentina, 1951, based on the play Tohuwabohu)
- On the Riviera, directed by Walter Lang (1951, based on the play Die Nacht vor dem Ultimo)
- Drei, von denen man spricht, directed by Axel von Ambesser (West Germany, 1953, based on the play Hau-ruck)

=== Screenwriter ===
- Die Menschen nennen es Liebe, directed by Mano Ziffer-Teschenbruck (Germany, 1922)
- Sommerliebe, directed by Erich Engel (Germany, 1942)
