= The Orchestra and Its Instruments =

1937 British TV documentary series

The Orchestra and Its Instruments is a British television programme that aired in 1937 on the BBC. It was one of the earliest documentary series produced for British television.

The Orchestra debuted on 5 January 1937, hosted by Philip Thornton. The series discussed the different instruments of a symphony orchestra. It aired in a 20-minute time-slot.

The series is lost, as it aired live, and methods to record live television did not exist until late 1947, and were used very rarely by the BBC until the mid-1950s.
