= Bitter Sweet (1933 film) =

1933 British film by Herbert Wilcox

- Theatrical release poster
- Directed by: Herbert Wilcox
- Screenplay by: Lydia Hayward; Monckton Hoffe; Herbert Wilcox
- Based on: Bitter Sweet; 1929 operetta by Noël Coward
- Produced by: Herbert Wilcox
- Starring: Anna Neagle; Fernand Gravey; Esmé Percy; Clifford Heatherley; Ivy St. Helier
- Cinematography: Freddie Young
- Edited by: Michael Hankinson
- Music by: Roy Robertson
- Production company: Herbert Wilcox Productions
- Distributed by: United Artists
- Release date: 31 August 1933
- Running time: 93 minutes
- Country: United Kingdom
- Language: English
- Box office: £500,000

Bitter Sweet is a British musical romance film directed by Herbert Wilcox and released by United Artists in 1933. It was the first film adaptation of Noël Coward's 1929 operetta Bitter Sweet. It starred Anna Neagle and Fernand Gravey, with Ivy St. Helier reviving her stage role as Manon. It was made at British and Dominion's Elstree Studios and was part of a boom in operetta films during the 1930s.

It tells the story of Sarah Linden's romance. Sarah, now a gray-haired old woman, tells her story to a girl who is on the eve of marrying an obnoxious man when she is really in love with a musician.

The operetta was remade in 1940 as a film of the same name with Jeanette MacDonald and Nelson Eddy; however, it was less faithful to the original story than the less censored 1933 version.

== Plot summary ==
The narrative is framed as a reminiscence by an elderly, grey-haired Marchioness of Shayne, who observes a young woman in her drawing-room preparing to make a marriage of convenience to an obnoxious suitor while ignoring her true love, To counsel the girl, the Marchioness reflects back upon her own youth and her great, tragic romance.

As a young woman in late 19th-century London named Sarah Millick, she falls deeply in love with her music tutor, Carl Linden. Defying her conventional upperclass family's expectations and her arranged marriage to Hugh Devon. Sarah elopes with Carl to Vienna. There, the couple leads a modest, joyful life as Carl works as a conductor and pianist in a bustling local café orchestra alongside other bohemian artists.

Their happiness is shattered when the arrogant wealthy Austrian officer Captain Auguste sets his sights on Sarah, aggressively pursuing her and insulting Carl. when Carl attempts to defend his wife's honour in a duel with the Captain, Carl is tragically killed. Years later a grieving Sarah returns to England and marries Lord Shayne, living out their life with the bittersweet memory of her first love.

== Cast ==
- Anna Neagle as Sarah Millick / Sari Linden
- Fernand Gravey as Carl Linden
- Miles Mander as Captain Auguste Lutte
- Clifford Heatherley as Herr Schlick
- Esmé Percy as Hugh Devon
- Ivy St. Helier as Manon la Crevette
- Gibb McLaughlin as the footman
- Stuart Robertson as Lieutenant Tranisch
- Hugh Williams as Vincent
- Pat Paterson as Dolly
- Patrick Ludlow as Henry
- Kay Hammond as Gussi
- Miles Malleson as the butler
- Norma Whalley as Mrs. Millick
- Al Bowlly as singer
- Nat Gonella as trumpeter
- Alan Napier as Lord Shayne
- Lew Stone as bandleader
- Michael Wilding as extra

== Reception ==
According to Wilcox the film made no profits. He later wrote "it must have been my fault, for surely a better musical play has never been written... perhaps, however, the story is rather too sad for a film."

The Daily Film Renter wrote: "Magnificently staged talkie version of Noel Coward's famous operetta, which comes to screen with wealth of picturesque detail, abundance of haunting melodies, and fragrant charm that is irresistible. ... Ivy St. Helier shares acting honours with Anna Neagle by a brilliantly sketched portrait of disillusioned cabaret singer, while star, in characterisation that ranges from girlhood to grey hairs, does remarkably well. Clifford Heatherley gives strong support. Tempo on slow side, but this is moot point in view of superb entertainment qualities of production as whole."

Kine Weekly wrote: "A literal thematic translation of Noel Coward's tremendously popular play, which displays little inspiration in its treatment, but, nevertheless, has bouquet and fragrance and is rich in feminine appeal. ... Anna Neagle is entrusted with the leading role, and although its responsibilities weigh rather heavily on ber young shoulders, she succeeds in investing it with unsophisticated charm. The support is adequate and the general tone of the production has polish."
