= Charles Henry Mills =

English-American classical composer and academic (1873–1937)

Charles Henry Mills (January 29, 1873 – July 23, 1937) was an English-American composer and director of the University of Wisconsin–Madison School of Music.

He was born in Nottingham, England and attended the Guildhall School of Music in London. Mills received a B.Mus. degree from the University of Edinburgh in 1904. He accepted a position as professor at Syracuse University in 1907. In 1908, he married Caroline Louise Bell Miller. In the same year, he became professor of music at the University of Illinois. In 1911, he received a D.Mus. in music from McGill University. From 1914 to 1937, Mills served as professor of music and director for the School of Music at the University of Wisconsin–Madison. The Mills Music Library at the University was named in his honour.

He died in Madison.
