= James Dyrenforth =

American actor and songwriter (1895–1973)

James Dyrenforth (January 31, 1895 – December 26, 1973) was an American actor and songwriter.

Dyrenforth appeared in A Night to Remember (1958), Fiend Without a Face (1958), and Lolita (1962), and co-wrote "A Garden in the Rain", a song which was covered by Frank Sinatra and Sarah Vaughan, among others. He wrote lyrics for The Golden Year, a BBC television play of 1951.

== Filmography ==
Year	Title	Role	Notes
1957	Confess, Killer	Doctor	
1958	A Night to Remember	Col. Archibald Gracie	
1958	Fiend Without a Face	Mayor	
1958	Floods of Fear	Mayor	
1959	Carlton-Browne of the F.O.	Admiral	Uncredited
1960	Never Take Sweets from a Stranger	Dr. Stevens	
1960	The City of the Dead	Garage Attendant	
1962	Lolita	Frederick Beale Sr.	
1963	The Girl Hunters	Bayliss Henry	
1964	The Secret Door	Prison Warden	
1969	The Magic Christian	Socialite in Sotheby's	Uncredited
1970	The Revolutionary	Guest at Party #2	
