= Chili Bouchier =

British actress (1909–1999)

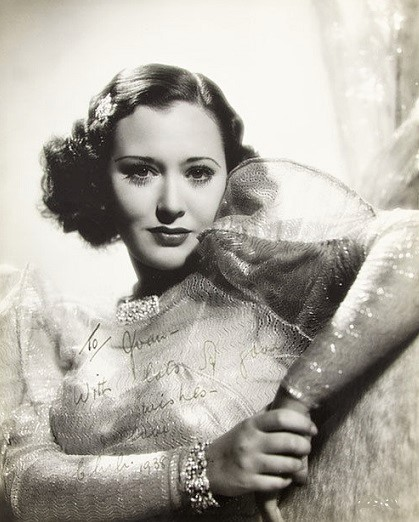
- Publicity image from Who's Who on the Screen, 1938
- Born: Dorothy Irene Boucher; 12 September 1909; Fulham, London, England
- Died: 9 September 1999 (aged 89); Marylebone, London, England
- Other name: Dorothy Bouchier
- Years active: 1927–1996

Chili Bouchier (born Dorothy Irene Boucher; 12 September 1909 – 9 September 1999) was an English film actress who achieved success during the silent film era, and went on to many screen appearances with the advent of sound films, before progressing to theatre later in her career.

== Career ==
Dorothy Irene Boucher was the daughter of an assessor for a painting and decorating firm. As a child, her initial ambition was to be a dancer and she enrolled at a ballet school. She made her first appearance as a child dancer at a charity performance. She became a typist on leaving school and later a model at Harrods, where her brother worked. Her first appearance was as a bathing belle in Shooting Stars. Bouchier won a contest run by the Daily Mail in 1927 to become a film star.

In 1928, she appeared in a short film made in the DeForest Phonofilm sound-on-film process, Ain't She Sweet, with Dick Henderson. She was known as Britain's "It girl", and the answer to Clara Bow in Hollywood, who was famous for the tag.

She achieved success in the 1930s with the films Carnival (1931), directed by Herbert Wilcox and Gypsy (1937). The latter was made by the British arm of Warner Brothers at Teddington Studios, but, like a number of her films, is considered to be lost. She also played the supporting role of Cleopatra in The Ghost Goes West, starring Robert Donat. During this period, she was brought over to Warner Brothers in Hollywood but broke her contract after being kept hanging around. This reportedly caused her to be blackballed and unable to make another film. Hollywood film producer and business magnate Howard Hughes proposed to her, but Bouchier's great love was the bandleader Teddy Joyce, to whom she was engaged before his premature death.

Despite this setback, she continued to appear in British films until 1960, albeit often in supporting roles in B-movies. Among her later films were Murder in Reverse? (1945), a successful thriller starring William Hartnell, and Old Mother Riley's New Venture (1949), part of the successful series of Old Mother Riley comedy films.

Bouchier combined her film career with a great deal of stage work in the UK. From 1950, onwards most of her appearances were on stage in dramas, comedies and revues, where she continued to work until well into her eighties.

== Personal life ==
In September 1929, she married the actor Harry Milton (1900-1965) whom she had met on set while filming Chick. The marriage was dissolved in 1937. He had been unfaithful to her with the actress Jessie Matthews.

Bouchier married another actor, 23 year-old Peter De Greef, in 1946, in Kensington, London. Prior to their marriage, they acted together in the play The Man Who Wrote Murder in February 1945, according to a newspaper clipping. They separated a few months later, and the marriage was finally dissolved in 1955.

Her last marriage was to the Australian film director Bluey Hill, who she met when they were both residents of Dolphin Square in Pimlico. They lived together for 23 years before marrying on 1 April 1977. He predeceased her, dying in 1986.

== Later years ==
In 1996, Bouchier published her autobiography, Shooting Star, and received some media attention: she was a guest on the BBC Radio 4 series Desert Island Discs in January, and was the subject of This Is Your Life in February, when she was surprised by Michael Aspel at a book signing session at Harrods. Featured guests were Patricia Roc, Sian Phillips, Peggy Mount, Avril Angers, Lionel Blair, Mary Millar, Dorothy Tutin, Douglas Fairbanks Jr., Leslie Ash and Petula Clark.

== Death ==
Bouchier died three days short of her ninetieth birthday in her ground floor flat in Marylebone, London, following a serious fall.

Her agent, Vincent Shaw, said of her after her death, "She was one of the last of the great pre-war beauties - a fabulous trouper and a lovely lady." Author Michael Thornton, a close friend, said: "Her life was a rollercoaster. She had known great wealth and acclaim, but sadly died alone in virtual poverty in a tiny council flat supported financially by theatrical charities. John Paul Getty was marvellous to her, and always had a crate of champagne delivered to her flat on every birthday. He will be sad to hear of her death."

== Selected filmography ==
Year	Title	Role	Notes
1927	Mumsie		Uncredited
1927	A Woman in Pawn	Elaine	
1927	Shooting Stars	Winnie	Bathing beauty
1928	Dawn	Minor Role	Uncredited
1928	Maria Marten	Minor Role	Uncredited
1928	Palais de danse	No. 2	
1928	Chick	Minnie Jarvis	
1928	You Know What Sailors Are	The Spanish Captain's Daughter	
1929	The Silver King	Olive Skinner	
1929	Downstream	Lena	
1929	City of Play	Ariel	
1930	Warned Off	Florrie Greville	
1930	Kissing Cup's Race	Gabrielle	
1930	Enter the Queen	Marjorie Manners	Short
1930	Call of the Sea	Poquita	
1931	Brown Sugar	Ninon de Veaux	
1931	Carnival	Simonetta Steno	
1932	The Blue Danube	Yutka	
1932	Ebb Tide	Cassie	
1933	The King's Cup	Betty Conway	
1933	Summer Lightning	Sue Brown	
1933	Purse Strings	Mary Willmore	
1934	It's a Cop	Babette	
1934	To Be a Lady	Diana Whitcombe	
1934	The Office Wife	Linda	Short
1935	Death Drives Through	Kay Lord	
1935	Royal Cavalcade	Landgirl	
1935	The Mad Hatters	Vicki	
1935	Honours Easy	Kate	
1935	Lucky Days	Patsy Cartwright	
1935	Get Off My Foot	Marie	
1935	Mr. Cohen Takes a Walk	Julia Levine	
1935	The Ghost Goes West	Cleopatra	
1936	Faithful	Pamela Carson	
1936	Where's Sally?	Sonia	
1936	Southern Roses	Estrella Estrello	
1937	Gypsy	Hassina	
1937	Mayfair Melody	Carmen	
1937	The Minstrel Boy	Dee Dawn	
1937	Change for a Sovereign	Countess Rita	
1938	The Singing Cop	Kit Fitzwillow	
1938	The Dark Stairway	Betty Trimmer	
1938	Mr. Satan	Jacqueline Manet	
1938	The Return of Carol Deane	Anne Dempster	
1938	Everything Happens to Me	Sally Green	
1939	The Mind of Mr. Reeder	Elsa Weford	
1941	My Wife's Family	Rosa Latour	
1941	Facing the Music	Anna Braun	
1945	Murder in Reverse	Doris Masterick	
1946	The Laughing Lady	Louise	
1947	Mrs. Fitzherbert	Norris	
1949	The Case of Charles Peace	Katherine Dyson	
1949	Old Mother Riley's New Venture	Cora	
1952	Blueprint for Danger	Babs	
1957	The Counterfeit Plan	Gerta	Housekeeper
1959	The Boy and the Bridge	Publican's wife	
1960	Dead Lucky	Mrs. Winston	Final film role
