= Badger's Green =

Badger's Green may refer to:

- Badger's Green (play), by R.C. Sheriff
- Badger's Green (1934 film), film adaptation
- Badger's Green (1949 film), film adaptation
