= Old Faithful (disambiguation) =

Old Faithful is a geyser within Yellowstone National Park.

Old Faithful may also refer to:

- Old Faithful (film), a 1935 film
- "Old Faithful" (rugby league song)
- "Old Faithful" (Hope & Faith episode)
- "Old Faithful", a 1934 short story by Raymond Z. Gallun
- "Old Faithful", a 1955 story from The Railway Series book Four Little Engines
- Old Faithful, Graeme Obree's bicycle

== See also ==
- Old Faithful Historic District, a historic district in Yellowstone National Park
- Old Faithful Inn, a hotel in Yellowstone National Park
- Old Faithful of California, a geyser near Calistoga, California
