= Just Suppose =

1926 film

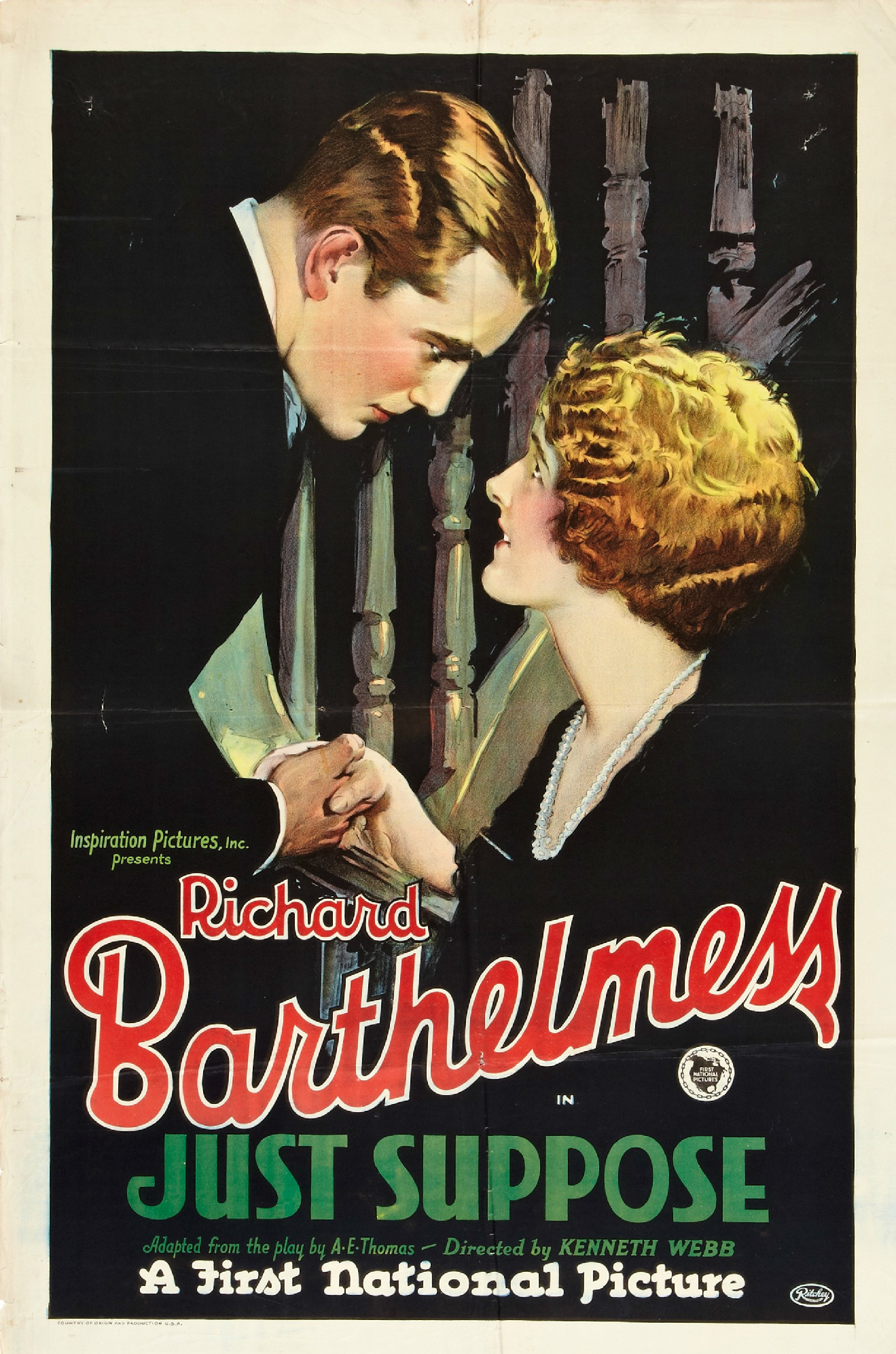
- Film poster
- Directed by: Kenneth Webb
- Written by: Violet E. Powell (adaptation); C. Graham Baker (scenario)
- Based on: Just Suppose; 1920 play by Albert Ellsworth Thomas
- Produced by: Richard Barthelmess
- Starring: Richard Barthelmess; Lois Moran
- Cinematography: Stuart Kelson
- Edited by: William Hamilton
- Distributed by: First National Pictures
- Release date: January 10, 1926
- Running time: 70 minutes; 7 reels (6,270 feet)
- Country: United States
- Language: Silent (English intertitles)

Just Suppose is a 1926 American silent drama film produced by and starring Richard Barthelmess with distribution through First National Pictures. Kenneth Webb directed Barthelmess and young Lois Moran star. The film is based on the 1920 Broadway play Just Suppose by Albert E. Thomas.

== Plot ==
As described in a film magazine review, Rupert, the second son of the King of Koronia, goes to America where he meets Linda Lee Stafford, a young woman he previously had become acquainted with back home. He tells her of his love for her. Rupert is then called back to Koronia upon the death of his older brother the Crown Prince, putting Rupert in direct line to the throne. However, twins are then born to the widow of the deceased Crown Prince. This makes Rupert free to wed whom he will, and he rushes to see Linda who has returned to Europe on a visit.

== Cast ==
- Richard Barthelmess as Prince Rupert of Koronia
- Lois Moran as Linda Lee Stafford
- Geoffrey Kerr as Count Anton Teschy
- Henry Vibart as Baron Karnaby
- George Spelvin as King (George Spelvin is a pseudonym)
- Harry Short as Crown Prince
- Bijou Fernandez as Mrs. Stafford
- Prince Rokneddin as Private Secretary

== Preservation ==
A print of Just Suppose is in the UCLA Film & Television Archive.
