= Badger's Green (play) =

- First edition: Victor Gollancz, 1930
- Written by: R.C. Sherriff
- Original language: English

Premiere
- Date premiered: 12 June 1930
- Place premiered: Prince of Wales Theatre, London

Badger's Green is a 1930 British comedy play written by R.C. Sheriff. A company has ambitious plans to redevelop the quiet, picturesque village of Badger's Green. The inhabitants mount a resistance campaign and it is eventually decided to settle the future of the village by playing a cricket match.

The play originally opened in June 1930 at London's Prince of Wales Theatre, where it ran for only 35 performances. It has however, been adapted for the screen three times: a 1934 version starring Valerie Hobson, a 1938 version starring Maurice Denham and a 1949 version starring Garry Marsh. It was also adapted for television twice: a now-lost 1938 version on BBC television and a 1958 version as part of ITV Television Playhouse, also lost.

== Original West End cast ==
- Mr. Butler - Felix Aylmer
- Mr. Rogers - Frederick Burtwell
- Mr. Butler's secretary - Maisie Darrell
- Dickie Wetherby - Robert Douglas
- Ginger - George Elliston
- Major Forrester - Louis Goodrich
- Mary - Kathleen Harrison
- Dr. Wetherby - Horace Hodges
- Mrs Wetherby - Margaret Scudamore
- Woman - Peggy Seton
- Mrs. Forrester - Hilda Sims
- Mr. Twigg - Sebastian Smith
