= Grumpy (1923 film) =

1923 film by William C. deMille

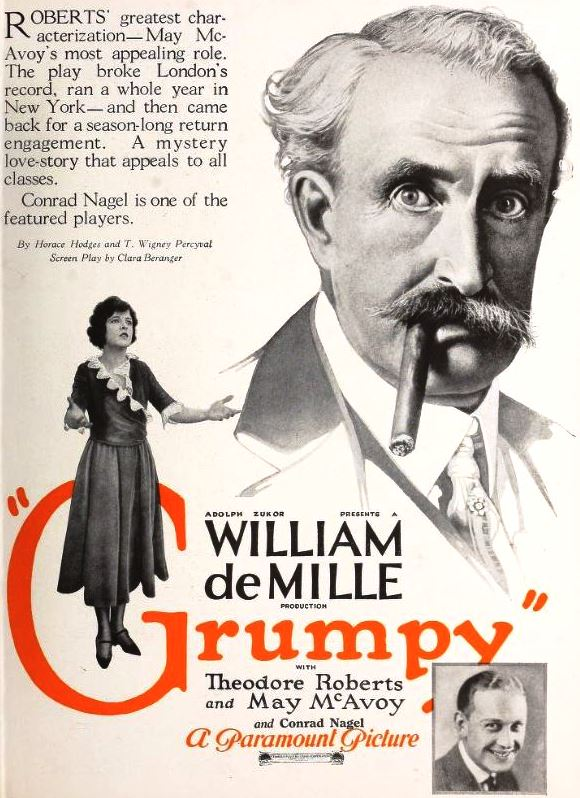
- Advertisement
- Directed by: William C. deMille
- Written by: Clara Beranger (adaptation, screenplay)
- Based on: Grumpy by Horace Hodges and Thomas Wigney Percyval
- Produced by: Adolph Zukor; Jesse Lasky
- Starring: Theodore Roberts
- Cinematography: L. Guy Wilky
- Distributed by: Paramount Pictures
- Release date: March 11, 1923
- Running time: 7 reels
- Country: United States
- Language: Silent (English intertitles)

Grumpy is a 1923 American silent comedy drama film distributed by Paramount Pictures. It is based on a 1913 Broadway play Grumpy by Horace Hodges and Thomas Wigney Percyval and starred English actor Cyril Maude. The director of this film is William C. deMille, brother of Cecil, and the star is Theodore Roberts. This film was remade by Paramount as an early sound film for Cyril Maude reprising his Broadway role.

== Plot ==
As described in a film magazine review, Ernest Heron wants to marry Virginia Bullivant, the daughter of retired lawyer Grumpy. Ernest is entrusted with a valuable diamond to bring to his firm in London. Chamberlin Jarvis, a crook and rival for the hand of the young woman, hears of the trip. After much intrigue, Jarvis obtains the diamond but, through the evidence of a gardenia, he is exposed and caught. Ernest and Virginia end up together.

== Cast ==
- Theodore Roberts as Grumpy
- May McAvoy as Virginia Bullivant
- Conrad Nagel as Ernest Heron
- Casson Ferguson as Chamberlin Jarvis
- Bertram Johns as Keble
- Charles Ogle as Ruddock
- Robert Bolder as Dawson
- Charles K. French as Wolfe
- Bernice Frank as Susan
- Bertram Frank as Jarvis' Valet

== Preservation ==
A complete print of Grumpy is held by Gosfilmofond in Moscow.
