= John Robinson (English actor) =

English actor (1908–1979)

- Robinson in Quatermass II (1955)
- Born: 11 November 1908; Liverpool, Lancashire, England
- Died: 6 March 1979 (aged 70); London, England
- Occupation: Actor
- Years active: 1929–1974

John Robinson (11 November 1908 – 6 March 1979) was an English actor, who was particularly active in the theatre. Mostly cast in minor and supporting roles in film and television, he is best remembered for being the second actor to play the famous television science-fiction role of Professor Bernard Quatermass, in the 1955 BBC Television serial Quatermass II.

== Biography ==
Robinson was born in Liverpool, Lancashire, England. His first professional appearance came in his home city in 1929, at the Liverpool Playhouse. He appeared in a variety of stage productions in London throughout the 1930s. These included Black Limelight by Gordon Sherry at the Q Theatre in 1937, where his role as Peter Charrington was described by The Times newspaper's critic as "a skilful, reticent sketch". In 1939, he played Fortinbras in John Gielgud's production of Hamlet, the final play to be performed at the Lyceum Theatre before its closure.

He made his film debut in 1936 in The Scarab Murder Case, and during the 1930s he also began appearing on radio and in the newer medium of television. In the Second World War he took part in the D-Day landings in 1944, as a member of the Reconnaissance Corps. He returned to acting in 1949, as John Beresford in the TV production of Elizabeth of Ladymead, appearing in several films and increasingly on television again. One of his best film roles (with higher billing than usual) was as the villain with redeeming qualities in Hammer the Toff (1952). Robinson compiled 56 film and television credits. His film appearances were usually minor parts, including uncredited roles in Lawrence of Arabia and The Longest Day (both 1962). Notable television appearances include starring roles on The Broken Horseshoe (1952) and The Small House at Allington (1960) and two guest appearances on The Saint opposite Roger Moore. He was also a regular performer on both the BBC's Sunday Night Theatre from 1951 to 1959, and ITV's Armchair Theatre from 1956 to 1965.

His final screen role was in the television series Fall of Eagles in 1974.

=== Quatermass ===
In August 1955, the actor Reginald Tate died the month before he was due to start work on Quatermass II, having played the part of the Professor in the first instalment of the series, The Quatermass Experiment. With only a short amount of time to cast a replacement, director Rudolph Cartier offered Robinson the role, as the only suitable actor available. Robinson had some difficulty with the technical dialogue he was required to learn, and was also uneasy about taking over a role that had been established by Tate.

Robinson was not available to reprise the part for the third serial, Quatermass and the Pit, in 1958, and André Morell took over the role. In the 1960s, Robinson starred in another science-fiction series, R3, which had some similarities to Quatermass.

== Death ==
Robinson died of cancer in London in March 1979, aged 70.

== Partial filmography ==
- The Heirloom Mystery (1936) - Dick Marriott
- The Scarab Murder Case (1936) (lost) - Donald Scarlett
- All That Glitters (1936) - Taylor
- Farewell to Cinderella (1937) - Stephen Moreley
- Q Planes (1939) - Pilot (uncredited)
- The Lion Has Wings (1939) - Unnamed Character
- Under Your Hat (1940) - Performer
- Uneasy Terms (1948) - Brighton Detective Inspector
- The Story of Shirley Yorke (1948) - Dr. Bruce Napier
- Hammer the Toff (1952) - Linnett
- Emergency Call (1952) - Dr. Braithwaite
- Ghost Ship (1952) - Prof. Mansel Martineau
- Gentlemen Prefer Blondes (1953) - Small Role (uncredited)
- The Constant Husband (1955) - Secretary
- Fortune Is a Woman (1957) - Berkeley Reckitt
- The Safecracker (1958) - Assistant Chief of Staff
- The Doctor's Dilemma (1958) - Sir Colenso Ridgeon
- And the Same to You (1960) - Archdeacon Humphrey Pomphret
- The Longest Day (1962) - Admiral Sir Bertram Ramsay (uncredited)
- Lawrence of Arabia (1962) - Infantry General at Field Briefing (uncredited)
- Nothing but the Night (1973) - Lord Fawnlee

== Sources ==
- Murray, Andy (2006). Into the Unknown: The Fantastic Life of Nigel Kneale (paperback). London: Headpress. pp. 192 pages. ISBN 1-900486-50-4.
- Pixley, Andrew (2005). The Quatermass Collection — Viewing Notes. London: BBC Worldwide. pp. 48 pages. BBCDVD1478.
