= Pleasure (1931 film) =

1931 film

- Directed by: Otto Brower
- Screenplay by: John Varley; Jo Van Ronkel; Thomas Thiteley
- Starring: Conway Tearle; Carmel Myers; Frances Dade
- Cinematography: Sidney Hickox
- Edited by: Tom Persons
- Production company: Supreme Feature Films Company
- Distributed by: Weiss Brothers
- Release date: 1 September 1931
- Running time: 70 minutes
- Country: United States
- Language: English

Pleasure is a 1931 American pre-Code romantic drama film, directed by Otto Brower and starring Conway Tearle, Carmel Myers, and Frances Dade.

== Cast ==
- Conway Tearle as Gerald Whitney
- Carmel Myers as Mrs. Dorothy Whitney
- Frances Dade as Joan Channing
- Paul Page as George Whitney
- Roscoe Karns as Arnie
- Lina Basquette as Helen
- Harold Goodwin as Lloyd
- Florence Lawrence as Martha
- Jack Byron as Allan Darrow
- George 'Gabby' Hayes as Motorcycle Cop
