= Frances Dade =

American actress (1910–1968)

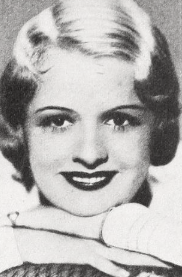
- Born: February 14, 1907; Philadelphia, Pennsylvania, U.S.
- Died: January 21, 1968 (aged 60); Philadelphia, Pennsylvania, U.S.
- Occupation: Actress
- Spouse: Brock Van Avery (m. 1932; div. 1958) (1 child)
- Children: daughter, with Avery

Frances Pemberton Dade (February 14, 1907 – January 21, 1968) was an American film and stage actress of the late 1920s and 1930s.

== Family ==
Dade was born on February 14, 1907, to Frances Rawle Pemberton and Francis Cadwallader Dade Jr. in Philadelphia, Pennsylvania. She was grandniece to Confederate General John Clifford Pemberton and first cousin to athlete Hobey Baker. She studied for one year at the School of the Theater in New York.

== Career ==
Dade acted at the Empire Theater in Toronto in 1928 and 1929, performing in a different play each week. Her other stock theater experience came in Alabama, Michigan, and New York. She did not like performing in touring companies, saying that the experience was "like traveling in a trunk". Dade moved to Hollywood, California in the late 1920s to pursue an acting career. She first caught the attention of Samuel Goldwyn as Lorelei Lee in the touring company of Gentlemen Prefer Blondes. He gave her a contract, though she later went freelance. Her first film role was in 1928, when she had an uncredited role alongside stars Dorothy Boyd and Mabel Poulton in The Constant Nymph. She also appeared in such films as Raffles (1930) and Seed (1931). She played one of the leading roles in Grumpy (1930).

In 1931, Dade was cast in the biggest role of her career as Lucy Weston in Dracula, which starred Bela Lugosi and Helen Chandler. The scene with Bela Lugosi hovering over her prostrate body remains an indelible part of pop culture. Dade was also the first actress to ever play the character of Lucy in a motion picture. That role would catapult her to brief notoriety, and would result in her being selected as one of thirteen WAMPAS Baby Stars, including Marian Marsh, Karen Morley, and Marion Shilling, that same year.

Despite her performance in Dracula, Dade's film role offers dwindled. She starred in six films in 1931, three of which were horror films. In 1932, she was featured in only one film, Big Town, and she appeared on Broadway in Collision.

== Personal life and death ==
Dade retired from acting and married wealthy socialite Brock Van Every on August 12, 1932, in Philadelphia. They had a daughter. The marriage developed problems, and they were divorced in 1958. She eventually moved back home to Philadelphia, and went into nursing.

In 1967, Dade was diagnosed with cancer, after which she lived with her daughter in Plainfield, New Jersey. Dade died at Birchwood Convalescent Center in Edison, New Jersey, in 1968, at the age of 60.

== Filmography ==
Year	Title	Role	Notes
1930	He Knew Women	Monica Grey	
1930	Raffles	Ethel Crowley	
1930	Grumpy	Virginia Bullivant	
1930	The Devil to Pay!	Bidder for Bed	Uncredited
1931	Dracula	Lucy	
1931	The She-Wolf	Faire Breen	
1931	Seed	Nancy	
1931	Pleasure	Joan Channing	
1931	Daughter of the Dragon	Joan Marshall	
1931	Range Law	Ruth Warren	
1932	Scandal for Sale	Manicurist	Uncredited
1932	Big Town	Patricia Holman	
