= Seed (1931 film) =

1931 film directed by John M. Stahl

- Theatrical release poster
- Directed by: John M. Stahl
- Written by: Gladys Lehman; Based on a story by Charles G. Norris
- Produced by: Carl Laemmle Jr. John M. Stahl
- Starring: John Boles; Lois Wilson; Genevieve Tobin; Bette Davis
- Cinematography: Jackson Rose
- Edited by: Ted J. Kent; Arthur Tavares
- Music by: Heinz Roemheld
- Distributed by: Universal Pictures
- Release date: May 14, 1931
- Running time: 96 minutes
- Country: United States
- Language: English

Seed is a 1931 American pre-Code drama film directed by John M. Stahl. The screenplay by Gladys Lehman is based on a novel by Charles G. Norris.

== Plot ==
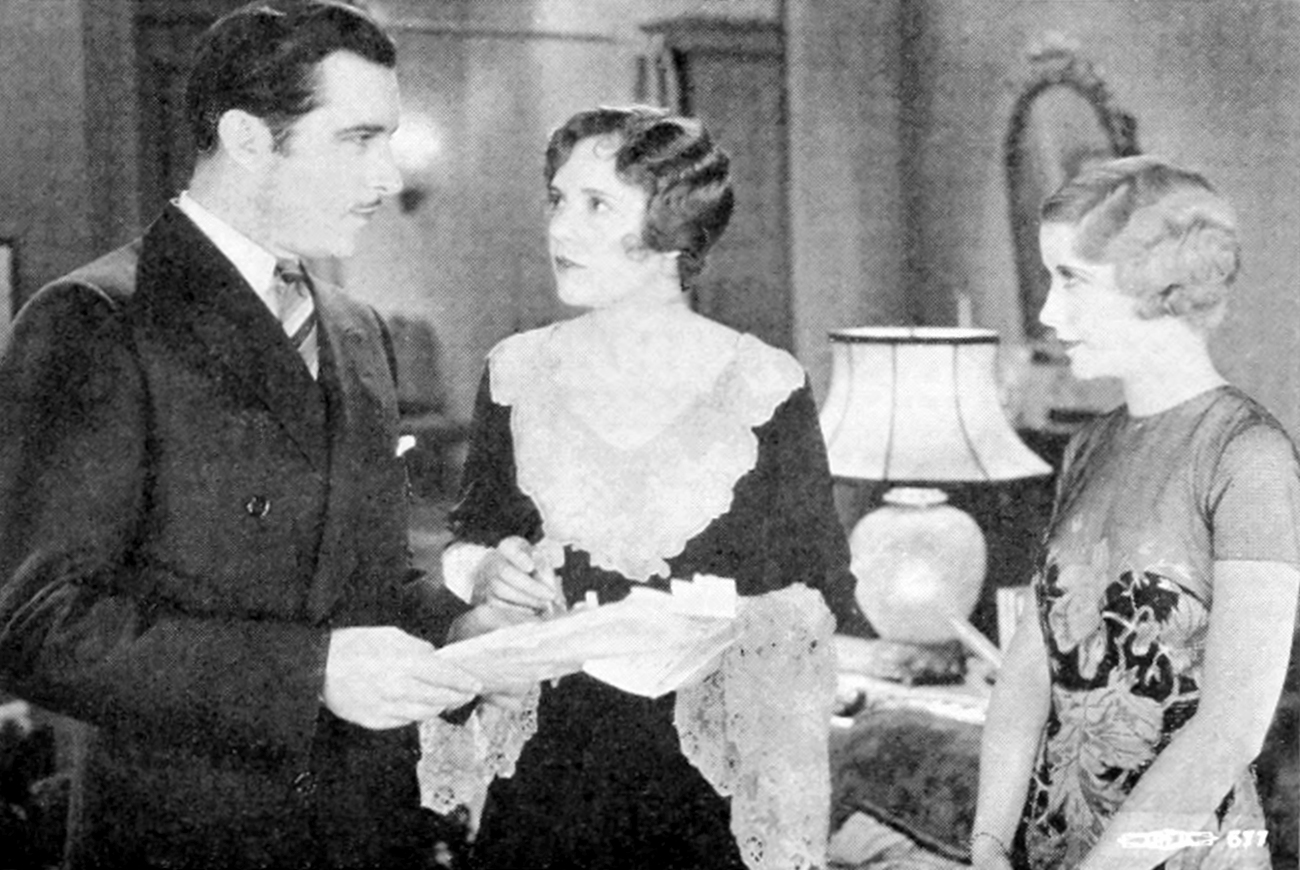
John Boles, Lois Wilson and Genevieve Tobin in Seed

Bart Carter has sacrificed a writing career so he can support his wife Peggy and their five children by working as a clerk in a New York City publishing house. When his former girlfriend Mildred Bronson, a literary agent who has been working in the Paris office, returns to the States, she arranges for Bart to draw his regular salary while working on a novel. Because his home life is so chaotic, Bart writes at Mildred's apartment during the day and frequently stays for dinner, and the two soon discover their old feelings for each other have been revived.

Bart's novel is published, and when Seed becomes a critical and commercial success, he abandons his family and moves to France with Mildred. Peggy opens a dress shop and lives with the children in an apartment above the store.

A decade later, the now-married Bart and Mildred return to New York. His grown children are delighted to see their father, who wishes to make amends for having left them. He suggests enrolling his daughter Margaret in finishing school, sending the twin boys to Harvard University, finding employment for his oldest son, and having the youngest boy live with him and Mildred. At her children's urging Peggy reluctantly agrees, although she feels she is losing them. Mildred assures her they will return to her one-day, whereas she believes their renewed relationship with their father will place her own future with Bart in jeopardy.

== Cast ==
- John Boles as Bart Carter
- Lois Wilson as Peggy Carter
- Genevieve Tobin as Mildred
- Raymond Hackett as Junior Carter
- ZaSu Pitts as Jennie
- Bette Davis as Margaret Carter
- Richard Tucker as Bliss
- Frances Dade as Nancy
- Jack Willis as Dicky Carter
- Dick Winslow as Johnny Carter
- Bill Willis as Danny Carter
- Dickie Moore as young Johnny Carter
- Helen Parrish as young Margaret Carter

== Production ==
Director John M. Stahl cast Bette Davis as Margaret Carter after seeing her in the studio commissary. It proved to be the smallest role of her career, and in later years she recalled "If you blinked for a moment, you would have missed me. I should have joined the extra's union."

== Critical reception ==
Mordaunt Hall of The New York Times wrote that the plot was "undoubtedly an interesting theme, but in the film it merely results in being an adult idea offered in adolescent form." He thought John Boles was "too placid to be convincing" and John M. Stahl's direction was "unimaginative." He concluded "It is a lethargic and often dull production, in spite of the good acting by both Genevieve Tobin as Mildred and Miss Wilson as Peggy, Zazu Pitts as a servant and passable performances by some of the other players."
