= Toni (1928 film) =

1928 film

- Directed by: Arthur Maude
- Written by: Dion Titheradge (play); Douglas Furber; Violet E. Powell
- Starring: Jack Buchanan; Dorothy Boyd; Forrester Harvey; Hayford Hobbs
- Cinematography: George Pocknall
- Production company: British International Pictures
- Distributed by: Wardour Films
- Release date: May 1928
- Running time: 72 minutes
- Country: United Kingdom
- Language: English

Toni is a 1928 British thriller film directed by Arthur Maude and starring Jack Buchanan, Dorothy Boyd and Forrester Harvey. It was made at Elstree Studios by British International Pictures. The complete index to literary sources in film indicates it is based on the 1924 musical play of the same name by Douglas Furber but various sources state the original play was by Dion Titheradge and credit Furber and Violet E. Powell for the screenplay.

== Cast ==
- Jack Buchanan - Toni Marr / Marini
- Dorothy Boyd - Princess Eugenie
- Forrester Harvey - Watts
- Hayford Hobbs - Delavine
- Henry Vibart - Gardo
- Moore Marriott - Meyer
- Lawson Butt - Mendel
- Frank Goldsmith - Olsen

== Bibliography ==
- Low, Rachael. History of the British Film, 1918-1929. George Allen & Unwin, 1971.
