= A Night in Montmartre =

1931 film

- Opening titles
- Directed by: Leslie S. Hiscott
- Written by: Walter Peacock (play); Miles Malleson (play); Angus MacPhail
- Produced by: Michael Balcon
- Starring: Horace Hodges; Franklin Dyall; Hugh Williams; Heather Angel
- Cinematography: Sydney Blythe
- Edited by: Jack Harris
- Production company: Gainsborough Pictures
- Distributed by: Gaumont British Distributors
- Release date: 17 July 1931
- Running time: 70 minutes
- Country: United Kingdom
- Language: English

A Night in Montmartre (also known as Night in Montmartre and Night of Montmartre) is a 1931 British mystery film directed by Leslie S. Hiscott and starring Horace Hodges, Franklin Dyall, Hugh Williams, Reginald Purdell and Austin Trevor. It was written by Angus MacPhail based on a play by Walter Peacock and Miles Malleson.

== Plot ==
When the owner of a large cafe in Montmartre and a notorious blackmailer is murdered, suspicion points at young artist Lucien Borell who owed him money. Things look worse for Lucien when his father arrives and, fancying himself a criminologist, uncovers evidence that accidentally makes his son look even more guilty. On his second attempt, however, he is able to unmask the real culprits.

== Cast ==
- Horace Hodges as Lucien Borell
- Franklin Dyall as Max Levine
- Hugh Williams as Philip Borell
- Heather Angel as Annette Lefevre
- Austin Trevor as Paul de Lisle
- Kay Hammond as Margot
- Edmund Willard as Alexandre
- Arthur Hambling as Inspector Brichot
- Reginald Purdell as Tino
- Binnie Barnes as Therese

== Production ==
The film was shot at Twickenham Studios in London with sets designed by the art director James Carter.

== Reception ==
Film Weekly wrote: "The acting of Horace Hodges and Heather Angel is pleasing; but the rest of the cast are too determinedly melodramatic. A mediocre film."

Variety wrote: "Picture is developed on an even keel with little attempt to build up to a climax. Result, it never gets enough kick to lift it out of the support class, and although competent in an unobtrusive way, remains one of those negative sort of pictures."
