= David Abel (cinematographer) =

Dutch cinematographer

- Born: December 15, 1883; Amsterdam
- Died: November 12, 1973 (aged 89); Los Angeles, California
- Burial place: Hollywood Forever Cemetery
- Years active: 1916-1937; 1942-1945
- Spouse: Eva Rayevsky

David Abel (15 December 1883 – 12 November 1973) was a cinematographer.

== Biography ==
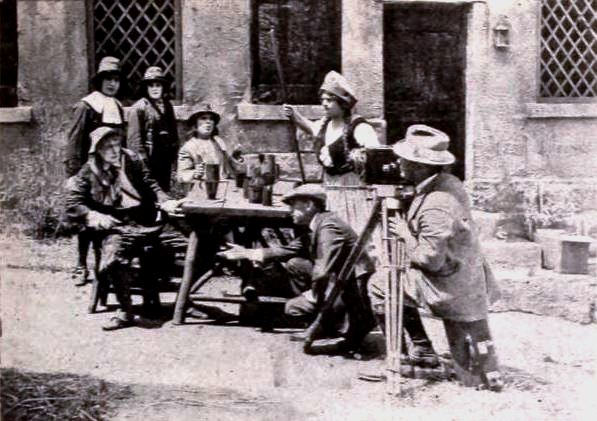
David Abel behind the camera in Rip Van Winkle (1921)

Born in Amsterdam to Russian parents, Abel began his career in 1916. He came to the United States as a child in the first decade of the 1900s and worked as a portrait photographer in New York before entering films with Flying A Studios in 1913. His credits include Grumpy (1930), The Virtuous Sin (1930), Huckleberry Finn (1931), The Gay Divorcee (1934), Top Hat (1935), Follow the Fleet (1936), and The Affairs of Susan (1945). At RKO Pictures during the 1930s, Abel was a favorite collaborator of director Mark Sandrich and was responsible for the photography of five Fred Astaire-Ginger Rogers musicals (The Gay Divorcee, Top Hat, Follow the Fleet, Swing Time, and Shall We Dance).

Other credits include The Awful Truth, Huckleberry Finn, Hips, Hips, Hooray!, Grumpy, The Virtuous Sin, and History Is Made at Night. He filmed a total of 110 films.

He retired in 1937 but Sandrich persuaded him to come back as cameraman for the classic Holiday Inn (1942). After two more films, Follow the Boys (1944) and The Affairs of Susan (1945), he left Hollywood film work for good.

Abel lived for over fifty years in Sierra Madre, California and died in Los Angeles, buried in the Hollywood Forever Cemetery. He and his wife, Eva ("Chava") Rayevsky did not leave behind children.

== Partial filmography ==
- The Heiress at Coffee Dan's (1916)
- Thais (1917)
- Madame Bo-Peep (1917)
- A Woman's Awakening (1917)
- The Splendid Sinner (1918)
- The Lady of the Dugout (1918)
- Our Little Wife (1918)
- The Heart of Wetona (1919)
- The Way of a Woman (1919)
- Rip Van Winkle (1921)
- Courage (1921)
- Little Miss Smiles (1922)
- The Men of Zanzibar (1922)
- Where's My Wandering Boy Tonight? (1922)
- Mixed Faces (1922)
- The Barefoot Boy (1923)
- Seven Sinners (1925)
- Rose of the World (1925)
- The Forbidden Woman (1927)
- Don't Tell the Wife (1927)
- Craig's Wife (1928)
- Tenth Avenue (1928)
- Ned McCobb's Daughter (1928)
- The Awful Truth (1929)
- The Racketeer (1929)
- Noisy Neighbors (1929)
- Square Shoulders (1929)
- Geraldine (1929)
- Grumpy (1930)
- The Virtuous Sin (1930)
- Swing High (1930)
- The Grand Parade (1930)
- Huckleberry Finn (1931)
- The Gay Divorcee (1934)
- Where Sinners Meet (1934)
- Top Hat (1935)
- Follow the Fleet (1936)
- History Is Made at Night (1937)
- Holiday Inn (1942)
- Follow the Boys (1944)
- The Affairs of Susan (1945)
