= Celia (1949 film) =

- Opening titles
- Directed by: Francis Searle
- Written by: Edward J. Mason (radio series); Roy Plomley; A.R. Rawlinson; Francis Searle
- Produced by: Anthony Hinds
- Starring: Hy Hazell; Bruce Lester; John Bailey
- Cinematography: Cedric Williams; Peter Bryan
- Edited by: Cliff Turner
- Music by: Rupert Grayson; Frank Spencer
- Production company: Hammer Films
- Distributed by: Exclusive Films
- Release date: 29 August 1949
- Running time: 67 minutes
- Country: United Kingdom
- Language: English

Celia (also known as Celia – The Sinister Affair of Poor Aunt Nora) is a 1949 British comedy-thriller second feature ('B') film directed by Francis Searle and starring Hy Hazell, Bruce Lester and John Bailey. It was written by A.R. Rawlinson and Searle, with additional dialogue by Roy Plomley, and was based on the 1948 BBC radio serial of the same title by Edward J. Mason. It was made by Hammer Films. The film had a built-in audience made up of listeners to the Celia radio program, and Hammer thought the film would make Hy Hazell a star.

== Plot ==
Celia, an unemployed actress, is reluctantly persuaded by private detective Larry Peters to once again help him with a case. She has a flair for undertaking character rôles but mainly agrees so she can buy a fashionable hat with the fee Larry offers to pay her. Celia poses as a cockney maid for a week in a large house where Lester Martin is suspected of marrying Aunt Nora, a much older woman, for her money and plans to kill her with poison. Lester falls victim himself to a death trap he sets for the old lady. When Celia goes to the hat store, she finds that Aunt Nora has already gone there and purchased the very hat that Celia was planning to buy.

== Cast ==
- Hy Hazell as Celia
- Bruce Lester as Larry Peters
- John Bailey as Lester Martin
- Elsie Wagstaff as Aunt Nora
- Ferdy Mayne as Antonio
- Lockwood West as Dr. Cresswell
- John Sharp as Mr. Haldane
- Joan Hickson as Mrs. Haldane
- James Raglan as Inspector Parker
- Jasmine Dee as Miss Arnold
- June Elvin as Ruby
- Charles Paton as grocer
- Olive Walter as woman in shop
- Grace Denbigh Russell as woman in shop

== Production ==
Denis Wreford was art director, Jimmy Sangster was second assistant and Phil Leakey handled makeup. It began production on 4 April 1949, and was completed on 12 May. It was released on 29 August 1949.

== Reception ==
The Monthly Film Bulletin wrote: "Celia, a character from a B.B.C. serial, investigates the sinister affair of poor Aunt Nora in a comedy thriller made with modest means and adequacy."

Kine Weekly wrote: "Neat and tidy romantic comedy crime melodrama, woven around the popular BBC character. ... Comely and versatile Hy Hazell does a good job in the name part, the support is adequate, the dialogue smooth and the staging well up to standard."

Picturegoer wrote: "Written around the popular B.B.C. character, this neatly made melodrama has a good story and the advantage of well-timed humour."

In British Sound Films: The Studio Years 1928–1959 David Quinlan rated the film as "average", writing: "Lively little thriller, quite tidily made."

Chibnall and McFarlane in The British 'B' Film called it a "light comedy-drama" and noted "the effective way in which [it] overcame its economic restrictions."
