= The Woman Between (1931 American film) =

1931 film by Victor Schertzinger

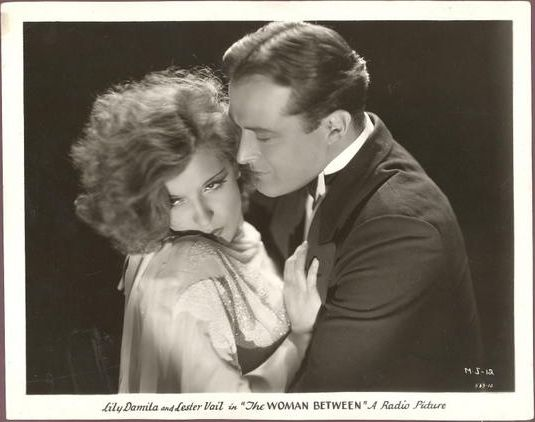
- Lobby card
- Directed by: Victor Schertzinger
- Screenplay by: Howard Estabrook
- Produced by: William LeBaron
- Starring: Lili Damita; Lester Vail; O.P. Heggie; Miriam Seegar; Anita Louise
- Cinematography: J. Roy Hunt
- Edited by: William Hamilton
- Music by: Victor Schertzinger
- Production company: RKO Pictures
- Distributed by: RKO Pictures
- Release date: August 8, 1931
- Running time: 73 minutes
- Country: United States
- Language: English

The Woman Between is a 1931 American pre-Code drama film directed by Victor Schertzinger and written by Howard Estabrook. The film stars Lili Damita, Lester Vail, O.P. Heggie, Miriam Seegar and Anita Louise. It was released on August 8, 1931, by RKO Pictures.

== Plot ==
A young man returns from Europe after several years of estrangement from his family caused by his disapproval of his father's remarriage after his mother's death. At the family reunion, he learns that his stepmother is the woman with whom he had a shipboard romance on the voyage home.

== Cast ==
- Lili Damita as Julie Whitcomb
- Lester Vail as Victor Whitcomb
- O.P. Heggie as John Whitcomb
- Miriam Seegar as Doris Whitcomb
- Anita Louise as Helen Weston
- Ruth Weston as Mrs. Black
- Lincoln Stedman as Buddy
- Blanche Friderici as Mrs. Weston
- William Morris as Frederick Weston
- Halliwell Hobbes as Barton
- George Chandler as Sweet, the last waiter to hold plate (uncredited)
