= Dance, Fools, Dance =

1931 film

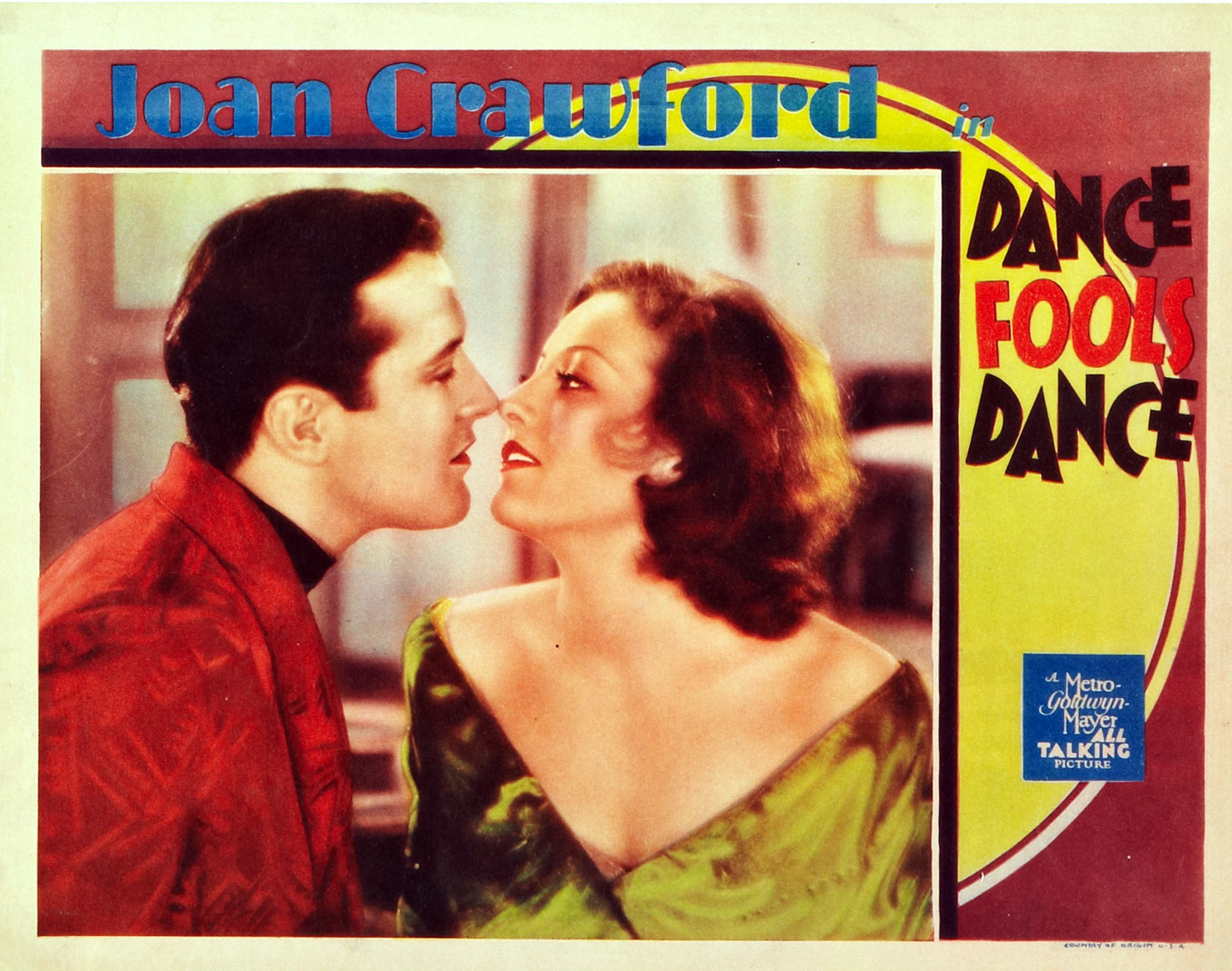
- Lobby card
- Directed by: Harry Beaumont
- Written by: Story and dialogue: Aurania Rouverol; Continuity: Richard Schayer
- Starring: Joan Crawford; Lester Vail; Clark Gable
- Cinematography: Charles Rosher
- Edited by: George Hively
- Distributed by: Metro-Goldwyn-Mayer
- Release date: February 21, 1931
- Running time: 80 minutes
- Country: United States
- Language: English
- Budget: $234,000
- Box office: $1.26 million

Dance, Fools, Dance is a 1931 American pre-Code drama film directed by Harry Beaumont and starring Joan Crawford, Clark Gable, and Lester Vail in a story about a reporter investigating the murder of a colleague. Story and dialogue were created by Aurania Rouverol. It was produced and distributed by Metro-Goldwyn-Mayer on February 21, 1931.

Dance, Fools, Dance was the first of eight movies featuring Crawford and Gable.

== Plot ==
The lives of socialite Bonnie Jordan and her brother, Rodney, are turned upside down when their father loses his fortune in the stock-market crash and subsequently dies of a heart attack.

The siblings are forced to fire their servants, sell their belongings, and work to earn a living.

Bonnie winds up as a cub reporter for a newspaper, while Rodney gets involved with a beer-running gang, but things begin to escalate for him quickly.

On one caper, Rodney drives the getaway car after his gang guns down a rival group, leaving Rodney emotionally scarred. Things worsen when Bonnie's colleague Bert Scranton finds out too much, and gang chief Jake Luva orders Rodney to murder him under threat of death.

Bonnie is given the task of investigating the murder of her colleague, and she infiltrates Jake Luva’s club as a dancer, eventually learning the horrifying truth that her brother is the murderer during an evening at Luva's apartment. She slips out and goes to see her brother, then returns to her own apartment -- where Jake and another gang member are lying in wait for her.

However, Rodney arrives just in time and a shootout occurs. As the authorities arrive, Jake and his henchman are dead, but so is Rodney; Bonnie cradles his head and cries. Pulling herself together, Bonnie phones the paper and through tears she reveals the truth about Bert's death and her brother's role.

Despite the paper's wanting to keep her on, Bonnie decides that she no longer wants to work for the paper. As she leaves the office, she's met by a former beau who is still rich, and the movie ends as the two kiss, with the implication that they later marry.

== Cast ==
- Joan Crawford as Bonnie Jordan
- Lester Vail as Bob Townsend
- Cliff Edwards as Bert Scranton
- William Bakewell as Rodney Jordan
- William Holden as Stanley Jordan
- Clark Gable as Jake Luva
- Earle Foxe as Wally Baxter (credited as Earl Foxe)
- Purnell B. Pratt as Parker
- Hale Hamilton as Selby
- Natalie Moorhead as Della
- Joan Marsh as Sylvia
- Russell Hopton as Whitey
- Sam McDaniel as Jake Luva's Butler

== Reception ==
Photoplay commented: "Again, Joan Crawford proves herself a great dramatic actress. The story ... is hokum, but it's good hokum, and Joan breathes life into her characterization." Andre Sennwald noted in The New York Times, Miss Crawford's acting is still self-conscious, but her admirers will find her performance well up to her standard."

=== Box office ===
According to MGM records, the film earned $848,000 in the U.S. and Canada, and $420,000 elsewhere, resulting in a profit of $524,000.

== Historical note ==
Several events in the screenplay are based loosely on real-life crimes that occurred in Chicago prior to the film's production, such as the St. Valentine's Day Massacre in 1929 and the murder of reporter Jake Lingle by underworld hoodlums in 1930.

== See also ==
- Joan Crawford filmography
- Clark Gable filmography
