= Old Faithful (film) =

1935 film

- Trade show advertisement
- Directed by: Maclean Rogers
- Written by: Kathleen Butler; H. F. Maltby
- Story by: Irving Dennes and Harry Dawes
- Produced by: A. George Smith
- Starring: Horace Hodges; Glennis Lorimer; Bruce Lester
- Production company: George Smith Enterprises
- Distributed by: RKO Radio Pictures (UK)
- Release date: 16 December 1935 (UK)
- Running time: 67 minutes
- Country: United Kingdom
- Language: English

Old Faithful is a 1935 British quota quickie drama film directed by Maclean Rogers and starring Horace Hodges, Glennis Lorimer and Bruce Lester. It was written by Kathleen Butler from a story by Irving Dennes and Harry Dawes.

== Preservation status ==
The British Film Institute National Archive holds a collection of ephemera and stills but no film or video materials.

== Synopsis ==
Bill Brunning is elderly taxi driver who refuses to give up his old horse, even though his business is being taken by younger drivers using modern cars. His anguish is increased when his daughter Lucy plans to marry one of the younger taxi drivers.

== Cast ==
- Horace Hodges as Bill Brunning
- Glennis Lorimer as Lucy Brunning
- Bruce Lester as Alf Haines
- Wally Patch as Joe Riley
- Isobel Scaife as Lily
- Muriel George as Martha Brown
- Edward Cooper as Edwards
- William Hartnell as minor role

== Critical reception ==
The Monthly Film Bulletin wrote: "The direction is slow and the humour rather ponderous at times, but the film is quite well acted and should prove fair entertainment for the simple-minded."

Kine Weekly wrote: "Homely romantic comedv drama of working-class life calmly pieced together from evergreen ingredients. There are no highspots in the picture, but the sentimental theme makes a modest appeal, and it is evenly balanced by simple drama and popular cockney humour. A cut above the usual quota offering, the film, with its useful cast and ingenuous entertainment, represents safe supporting proposition for the masses."

The Daily Film Renter wrote: "This homely material is developed lightly and comedy predominates, although there are one or two restrained moments of pathos. The atmosphere is naturally established, and the party scene in particular is true to type. The characterisations clinch the appeal of the film. Horace Hodges is excellent as the old-fashioned father whose hatred of things modern would be irritating were it not for his good nature. Wally Patch gives an uproarious cockney study, and steals most of the laughs, while Glennis Lorimer is attractive as the heroine,"

TV Guide wrote, "Though dated, this retains some moments of charm, thanks to Hodges' wonderful characterization."
