= R3 (TV series) =

- R3 on the cover of the Radio Times
- Genre: Drama
- Created by: N. J. Crisp
- Starring: John Robinson
- Theme music composer: Ken Thorne
- Country of origin: United Kingdom
- Original language: English
- No. of series: 2
- No. of episodes: 26 (all missing)

Production
- Producers: Andrew Osborn; John Robins
- Running time: 50 minutes
- Production company: BBC

Original release
- Network: BBC
- Release: 20 November 1964 – 28 September 1965

R3 is a fifty-minute British television drama series produced by the BBC between 1964 and 1965. Its full title was R.3 Ministry of Research Centre No. 3. The series starred John Robinson as Sir Michael Gerrard, Jeremy Young as Wilson, David Blake Kelly as Captain Rogers, and was set in a scientific research facility at the Ministry of Research. R3 is also notable for providing early TV exposure for a young Oliver Reed, cast as one of the scientists on the ministry staff, Dr. Richard Franklin.

No episodes of this series are known to have survived the BBC's purging of the archives between the 1960s and 70s. However, a trailer from one edition was recovered from a tape in 2004, but has not been shown to the public.

== Cast ==
- Sir Michael Gerrard – John Robinson
- Miss Brooks – Brenda Saunders
- Philip Boult – Michael Hawkins
- Tom Collis – Derek Benfield
- Dr Richard Franklin – Oliver Reed
- Dr George Fratton – Moultrie Kelsall
- Dr Mary Howard – Elizabeth Sellars
- Betty Mason – Janet Kelly
- Pomeroy – Edwin Richfield
- Porter – Maxwell Foster
- Dr Jack Morton – Simon Lack
- Dr Peter Travers – Richard Wordsworth
