= To Be a Lady =

1934 film

- Lobby card
- Directed by: George King
- Written by: Violet E. Powell; C. H. Nicholson
- Produced by: George King
- Starring: Chili Bouchier; Bruce Lester
- Edited by: Elmo Williams
- Distributed by: Paramount British Pictures
- Release date: July 1934
- Running time: 68 minutes
- Country: United Kingdom
- Language: English

To Be a Lady is a 1934 British romance drama, directed and produced by George King and starring Chili Bouchier and Bruce Lester. It was written by Violet E. Powell and C. H. Nicholson.

== Preservation status ==
The British Film Institute holds ephemera and stills in its National Archive, but no film or video materials. It has classed the film as "missing, believed lost", included in its "75 Most Wanted" list of missing British feature films.

== Plot ==
Diana Whitcombe works at her aunt's country inn, but dreams of escaping to London and making her way in society. When chance provides her with the necessary funds, she makes her way to the big city and takes up employment in a hairdressing salon where she befriends French fellow assistant Annette, and moves into the same hostel in which Annette is living.

One day Diana spots a kitten in danger on a busy road, and dashes into the traffic to rescue it. Her kind action is witnessed by singer Jerry Dean, who strikes up a conversation and invites her for lunch the next day at the Ritz Hotel. Diana is worried that has nothing suitable to wear to such a rarefied establishment, but is delighted when Annette produces a beautiful dress which she offers to loan to her. Unknown to Diana however, the dress has been stolen by a maid friend of Annette's from her wealthy employer, and passed to Annette for safe-keeping before it is sold to a dealer.

Diana and Jerry meet for their Ritz rendezvous. Unfortunately, also present is the Countess Delavell lunching with her theatrical friend Dudley Chalfont, and it is the Countess' stolen dress which Diana is wearing. At the end of the meeting Jerry, explaining that he has to leave to fulfil engagements in Scotland, proposes to Diana and she accepts. Meanwhile, the Countess' maid, aware that she is already under suspicion, steals some valuable jewellery, alerts Annette and the pair take off for France.

The Countess, believing Annette to be implicated in the thefts, visits the salon, identifies Diana as the girl who was wearing her dress, and Diana is arrested for receiving stolen property. She is found guilty and imprisoned for a month. She writes to Jerry at the address he has given her, but receives no acknowledgement. Jerry has in fact been seriously injured in a road accident en route to Scotland and is hospitalised for a lengthy period, but unaware of this, Diana believes he has abandoned her. On her release from prison, she decides to seek stage work and runs into Dudley. Dudley believes in her innocence and that she has been wronged, and offers her accommodation in his flat. He soon falls in love with her and asks her to marry him.

Jerry is finally released from hospital and returns to London to look for Diana. Finding her living in another man's flat, he confronts her over her fickleness and in anger at his lack of faith in her, she sends him away. She realises that her feelings are still for Jerry and it would be unfair of her to marry Dudley, so in despair she leaves London and returns to her home village. Aware of what the situation must be, the kind-hearted Dudley travels to the village with Jerry, where he engineers a reconciliation between the two.

== Cast ==
- Chili Bouchier as Diana Whitcombe (as Dorothy Bouchier)
- Bruce Lester as Jerry Dean
- Vera Bogetti as Countess Delavell
- Charles Cullum as Dudley Chalfont
- Ena Moon as Annette
- Pat Ronald as Justine
- Florence Vie as Mrs. Jubb
- Tony de Lungo as manager

== Reception ==
The Daily Film Renter wrote: "Direction is leisurely, but portrayals adequate. Passable quota offering. ... This conventional type of novelettish story has been built up on familiar lines, making it difficult to work up much enthusiasm for the effort as a whole."

Kine Weekly wrote: "Melodrama, the old story of the temptations of a big city presented in a modern, but far from convincing, guise. The theme is very obvious, and the laboured light relief accentuates its thinness. The majority of the players act reasonably well, but the plot is beyond their aid, and refuses to come to life. Moderate quota booking. ... Dorothy Bouchier acts reasonably well as Diana, Charles Cullum is quite good as Dudley, and Vera Boggetti is convincing as his mistress, but Bruce Lister is very weak as Jerry Dean. ... This drama gives a distorted view of life which can only appeal to and entertain the almost incredibly innocent."

Picturegoer wrote: "The old story of the temptations of a big city put over in a modern but unconvincing manner. Acting is moderate and the wholly obvious theme is indifferently directed."

Picture Show wrote: "Dorothy Bouchier as Diana gives a simple interpretation of the role which is quite attractive. Bruce Lister as Jerry proves quite a good hero. The rest of the cast are good, Vera Boggetti as the countess being worthy of special mention. Fair entertainment."
