= Consolation Marriage =

1931 film

- Theatrical release poster
- Directed by: Paul Sloane; Charles Kerr (assistant)
- Screenplay by: Humphrey Pearson
- Produced by: William LeBaron
- Starring: Irene Dunne; Pat O'Brien; John Halliday; Matt Moore; Myrna Loy
- Cinematography: J. Roy Hunt
- Edited by: Archie Marshek
- Music by: Max Steiner
- Production company: RKO Pictures
- Distributed by: RKO Pictures
- Release dates: October 15, 1931 (Hollywood premiere); November 21, 1931 (United States)
- Running time: 81 minutes
- Country: United States
- Language: English

Consolation Marriage is a 1931 American Pre-Code drama film directed by Paul Sloane and written by Humphrey Pearson. The film stars Irene Dunne, Pat O'Brien, John Halliday, Myrna Loy, and Matt Moore. The film was released on November 21, 1931, by RKO Pictures.

== Plot ==
In prohibition-era Manhattan, shopkeeper Mary Brown loses Aubrey, her childhood sweetheart, when he marries a rich woman. Reporter Steve "Rollo" Porter has also lost his childhood sweetheart, Elaine, who has married someone else. Mary and Steve become friends and make a marriage of convenience based on a shared sense of whimsical humor as well as their mutual losses. When their old loves re-enter their lives, a few years later, Mary and Steve must decide what is really important to them.

== Cast ==
- Irene Dunne as Mary Brown Porter
- Pat O'Brien as Steve Porter
- John Halliday as Jeff Hunter
- Myrna Loy as Elaine Brandon
- Matt Moore as the Colonel
- Lester Vail as Aubrey
- Elmer Ballard as Undetermined Role (uncredited)
- Wilson Benge as Elaine's Butler (uncredited)
- Edgar Dearing as Mulligan, a Policeman (uncredited)
- Wild Bill Elliott as Dog Show Attendee (uncredited)
- Tom Herbert as Dog Owner (uncredited)
- Robert Homans as Justice of the Peace (uncredited)
- Gertrude Howard as Kate, Mary's Maid (uncredited)
- Gladden James as Charlie, Newspaper Worker and One of the Boys (uncredited)
- Frank McLure as Celebrant in Ship's Cabin (uncredited)
- Dave O'Brien as Man Picking Up Stack of Newspapers (uncredited)
- Ronald R. Rondell as Dog Show Attendee (uncredited)
- Pauline Stevens as Baby Porter (uncredited)
