= The Beautiful City (1925 film) =

1925 film by Kenneth Webb

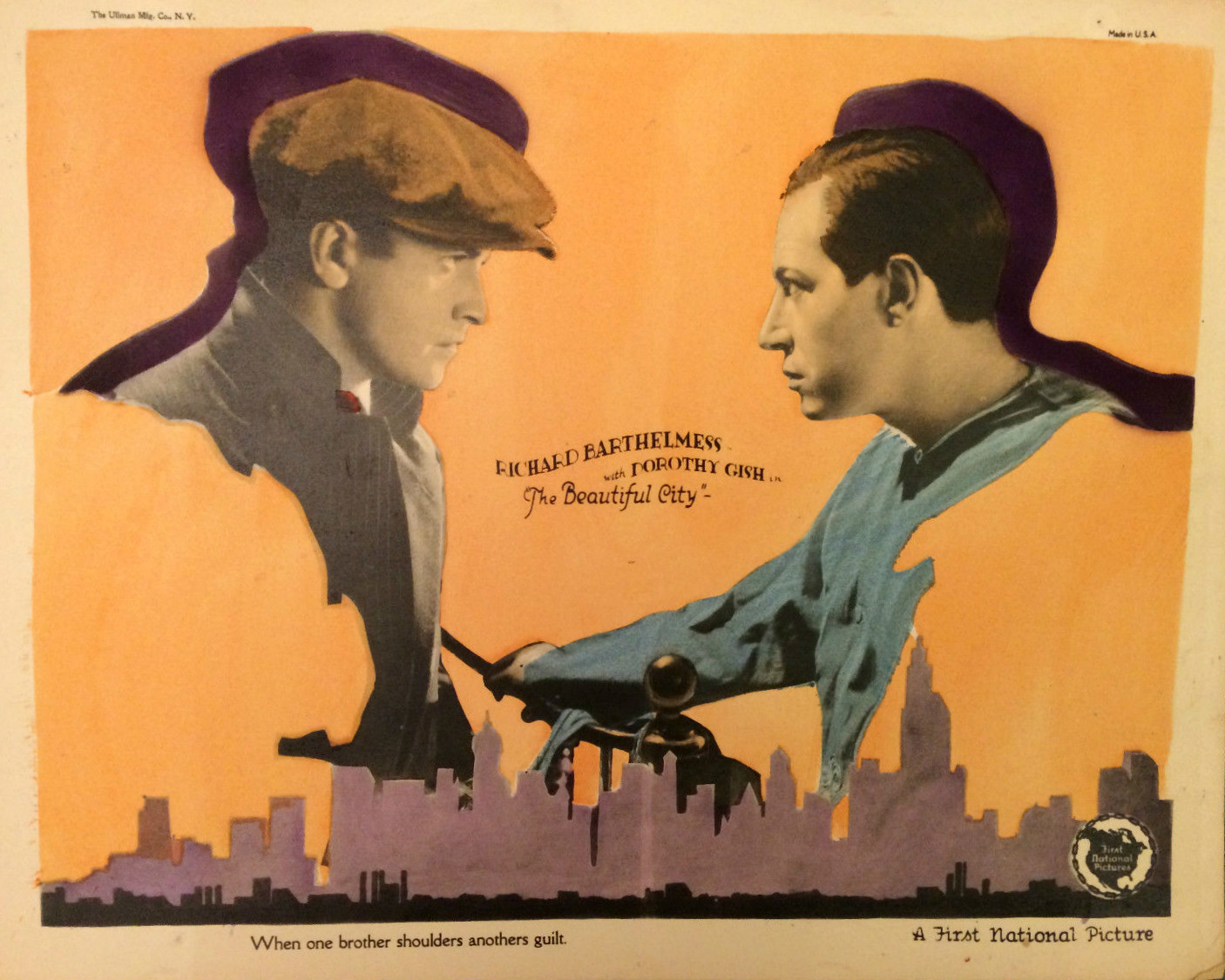
- Lobby card
- Directed by: Kenneth Webb
- Written by: C. Graham Baker (screenplay and titles); Don Bartlett (screenplay and titles); Violet E. Powell (adaptation)
- Story by: Edmund Goulding
- Starring: Richard Barthelmess; Dorothy Gish; William Powell
- Cinematography: Stuart Kelson; Roy Overbaugh
- Edited by: William Hamilton
- Production company: Inspiration Pictures
- Distributed by: First National Pictures
- Release date: October 25, 1925
- Running time: 7 reels
- Country: United States
- Language: Silent (English intertitles)

The Beautiful City is a 1925 American silent drama film directed by Kenneth Webb and starring Richard Barthelmess, Dorothy Gish, and William Powell. For their mother's sake, a man takes the blame for a robbery committed by his brother and his brother's gangster boss.

== Plot ==
As described in a film magazine review, Tony, a young Italian flower vendor who is in love with Mollie, a young Irish neighbor woman, becomes involved in a series of dangerous events by trying to reclaim his brother, who has fallen under the influence of a gangster-theatre manager. After hard fighting, the youth’s brother is turned from evil. Then the flower seller learns the beauty of his city and finds happiness with the young woman.

== Cast ==
- Richard Barthelmess as Tony Gillardi
- Dorothy Gish as Mollie
- William Powell as Nick Di Silva
- Frank Puglia as Carlo Gillardi
- Florence Auer as Mama Gillardi

== Reception ==
Mordaunt Hall gave a generally unfavorable review in The New York Times, calling The Beautiful City "quite a disappointing production. ... the story would have to be greatly improved to make it entertaining." However, he did note that, "William Powell makes the villainy as impressive as possible."

== Preservation ==
With no prints of The Beautiful City located in any film archives, it is a lost film.
