= Glennis Lorimer =

British actress (1913–1968)

- Gaumont British Picture Card, 1933
- Born: Glennis Dorothy Browne; 27 April 1913; Wandsworth, London, England
- Died: 17 November 1968 (aged 55); Guy's Hospital, London, England
- Other names: Glennis Ennis, Glennis Evans
- Occupation: Actress
- Years active: 1933-1939
- Spouse(s): Thomas Henry Ennis (1939-?); John Cowles Evans (1948-1968) (her death)

Glennis Lorimer (born Glennis Dorothy Browne; 27 April 1913 – 17 November 1968) was a British actress, who appeared in a number of films during the 1930s. She also appeared in the Gainsborough Pictures logo before the opening credits of films by that studio. She made her debut in the 1933 film Britannia of Billingsgate. Her last film appearance was in the 1939 Will Hay comedy Ask a Policeman. She died of cancer of the esophagus at Guy’s Hospital, London.

== Selected filmography ==
- Britannia of Billingsgate (1933)
- Orders is Orders (1934)
- My Old Dutch (1934)
- Old Faithful (1935)
- Car of Dreams (1935)
- Strictly Illegal (1935)
- It's Love Again (1936)
- All In (1936)
- The Interrupted Honeymoon (1936)
- Farewell to Cinderella (1937)
- Alf's Button Afloat (1938)
- Ask a Policeman (1939)
