= Grumpy (1930 film) =

1930 film

- Directed by: George Cukor; Cyril Gardner
- Written by: Doris Anderson; Based on the play by Horace Hodges and Thomas Wigney
- Starring: Cyril Maude; Frances Dade; Paul Lukas
- Cinematography: David Abel
- Music by: Karl Hajos
- Distributed by: Paramount Pictures
- Release date: August 1, 1930
- Running time: 74 minutes
- Country: United States
- Language: English

Grumpy is a 1930 American pre-Code drama film directed by George Cukor (in his directorial debut) and Cyril Gardner, and released by Paramount Pictures. The screenplay by Doris Anderson is based on a play by Horace Hodges and Thomas Wigney Percyval. A Spanish-language version entitled Cascarrabias, written by Catalan writer Josep Carner Ribalta (1898–1988) and directed by Gardner, was released by Paramount the same year. The film is a remake of a 1923 silent film of the same title.

== Plot ==
The titular character is a temperamental but lovable retired London barrister now living in the country with his granddaughter Virginia. Ernest Heron, Virginia's beau, returns from South Africa with a valuable diamond, and that night he is attacked and the gem is stolen. The only clue to the perpetrator's identity is a camellia Ernest is found clutching in his hand.

Suspicion falls upon Chamberlin Jarvis, an acquaintance of Virginia who was a houseguest at the time, and Grumpy follows him when he returns to the city, where he tries to sell the diamond to Berci. Knowing Jarvis is a suspect, Berci turns him away, and the thief, frightened by a confrontation with Grumpy, eventually returns to the country, returns the jewel, and is arrested.

== Cast ==
- Cyril Maude ..... Grumpy Bullivant
- Phillips Holmes ..... Ernest Heron
- Frances Dade ..... Virginia Bullivant
- Paul Lukas ..... Berci
- Paul Cavanagh ..... Chamberlin Jarvis

== Production ==
The film marked George Cukor's debut as a film director. Exteriors were filmed in Kernville, California. Interiors were filmed at Paramount's Astoria Studios in Queens, New York.
