= Bruce Lester =

South African-born English actor (1912–2008)

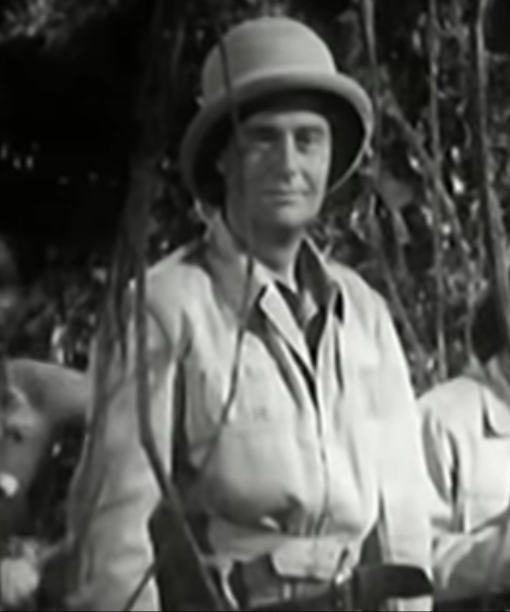
- Bruce Lester in Tarzan and the Trappers (1958)
- Born: Bruce Somerset Lister; 6 June 1912; Johannesburg, South Africa
- Died: 13 June 2008 (aged 96); Los Angeles, California, U.S.
- Resting place: Westwood Village Memorial Park
- Occupation: Actor
- Years active: 1934–1958
- Spouse: Jane Lester

Bruce Lester (6 June 1912 – 13 June 2008) was a South African-born English film actor with over 60 screen appearances to his credit between 1934 and his retirement from acting in 1958. Lester's career divided into two distinct periods. Between 1934 and 1938, billed as Bruce Lister, he appeared in upwards of 20 British films, mostly of the cheaply shot and quickly forgotten quota quickie variety. He then moved to the US, where he changed his surname to Lester, and found himself for a time appearing in some of the biggest prestige productions of their day, alongside stars such as Bette Davis, Joan Crawford, Tyrone Power and Errol Flynn. Lester himself never achieved star-billing, but was said to have remarked that this at least meant that if a film was a flop, no blame ever fell on his shoulders.

== Early life ==
Born in Johannesburg to English parents, Lester was educated at Brighton College in Sussex. He dabbled in amateur dramatics, but also showed potential as an exceptionally talented tennis player, and was considering trying to make a living from the sport until friends convinced him that acting offered far greater earning potential.

== Film career ==
=== 1930s ===
After spending some time as a stage actor, Lester obtained his first minor film role in the 1934 quota quickie The Girl in the Flat. His performance was noticed and a good career opportunity presented itself straight away when he was offered the male romantic lead in To Be a Lady, opposite Chili Bouchier, one of Britain's top female stars of the time. Far from a quota quickie, this was a quality production with a generous budget, but failed to perform as well as expected at the box-office. This was followed by another romantic lead, this time with Valerie Hobson, in Badger's Green, a film in which cricket played a major part and which was praised for its "Englishness". Both of these films are believed lost, but are deemed of great interest by the British Film Institute and are both included on its "75 Most Wanted" list of missing British feature films.

Lester's career then began to stagnate. The most enduring British film in which he appeared was Death at Broadcasting House, also from 1934, although his role was relatively minor. The next few years were spent toiling mainly in low-budget programmes, often in insignificant roles. Things took an upturn in 1938, when he was signed to Teddington Studios, the British division of Warner Brothers. He was promptly sent to the US, where he was cast in the James Cagney vehicle Boy Meets Girl. He was then signed to a three-year Hollywood contract, reportedly at Cagney's urging. One of his first Hollywood assignments was the high-profile historical drama If I Were King.

=== 1940s and 1950s ===
Lester's film career hit its peak in the early 1940s, beginning with the role of Mr. Bingley in the 1940 adaptation of Pride and Prejudice, followed by landing a plum role in the Bette Davis classic The Letter. Lester and Davis shared some crucial scenes in the film, and it was soon being reported that Davis was very taken by the handsome young Englishman, going out of her way to help him and put him at his ease on set. It is generally believed that a brief relationship of some description developed between the two, although nothing came of it. Writer Jerry Asher, a long-time friend of Davis, recalled: "She found Bruce attractive and sweet, but he was a bit tame for her speed."

At this time Lester briefly returned to Britain, intending to join the army. However he was persuaded that his talents would be better employed in helping to promote the Allied cause in the US. He returned, and appeared in several films in which he played flying officers, including Man Hunt, A Yank in the RAF and Desperate Journey. In 1943 he played in the Joan Crawford and Fred MacMurray spy drama Above Suspicion. He did then decide to join the British services, serving through to the end of the war.

On his return to Hollywood, Lester's career faltered, with both the quality of film and size of role he was being offered tapering off. He did land a good part in 1947's Golden Earrings with Ray Milland and Marlene Dietrich, then returned for a time to Europe, where he starred in But Not in Vain (1948 – filmed in the Netherlands) and Celia: The Sinister Affair of Poor Aunt Nora (1949).

Returning to the US, Lester began to turn his hand to working as a story analyst for Paramount and Columbia. In the early 1950s he was playing minor roles in low-budget versions of English-set historical dramas such as Tales of Robin Hood and Lorna Doone. As the decade progressed film parts became ever-smaller, until he was mainly playing uncredited bit parts. Lester's final screen credit came in 1958's Tarzan and the Trappers, after which he decided to retire from acting and spend the rest of his life out of the spotlight.

== Later life ==
In later years, Lester and his wife divided their time between Los Angeles and Palm Springs. He continued to play tennis, and was a keen member of the Hollywood Cricket Club. Lester died in Los Angeles on 13 June 2008, one week after his 96th birthday.

== Filmography ==
- 1934: The Girl in the Flat - Bit Role (uncredited)
- 1934: To Be a Lady - Jerry Dean
- 1934: Badger's Green - Dickie Wetherby
- 1934: Death at Broadcasting House - Peter Ridgwell (uncredited)
- 1934: The Third Clue - Derek Clayton
- 1935: Old Faithful - Chris Morgan
- 1935: Old Roses - Alf Haines
- 1936: Ourselves Alone - 2nd Lieut. Lingard
- 1936: A Star Fell from Heaven - Winkler
- 1936: The Tenth Man - Edward O'Donnell
- 1936: Crime Over London - Ronald Martin
- 1936: Hail and Farewell - Peter Dove
- 1936: The Heirloom Mystery - Alf Dene
- 1936: Head Office - Halliday
- 1937: Mayfair Melody - Dickie
- 1937: The Windmill - Officer
- 1937: Ship's Concert (Short) - Purser
- 1937: Change for a Sovereign - Prince William
- 1938: Quiet Please - Dr. Faversham
- 1938: Thistledown - Lord James Dunfoyle
- 1938: Boy Meets Girl - Rodney Bowman
- 1938: If I Were King - Noel le Jolys
- 1939: Home from Home - Jim
- 1939: The Witness Vanishes - Lord Noel Stratton
- 1940: The Invisible Man Returns - Chaplain (uncredited)
- 1940: British Intelligence - Frank Bennett
- 1940: My Son, My Son! - Rory O'Riorden
- 1940: Pride and Prejudice - Mr. Bingley
- 1940: The Letter - John Withers
- 1941: Shadows on the Stairs - Hugh Bromilow
- 1941: Singapore Woman - Clyde
- 1941: Shining Victory - Dr. Bentley
- 1941: Man Hunt - Co-Pilot (uncredited)
- 1941: A Yank in the RAF - Flight Lt. Sterling Richardson
- 1942: Eagle Squadron - King (uncredited)
- 1942: Desperate Journey - English Officer
- 1943: The Mysterious Doctor - Lt. Christopher 'Kit' Hilton
- 1943: Above Suspicion - Thornley
- 1943: Flesh and Fantasy - Young Man (uncredited)
- 1946: The Wife of Monte Cristo - (uncredited)
- 1946: Without Reservations - Army Lieutenant (uncredited)
- 1946: Cloak and Dagger - British Officer (uncredited)
- 1946: Strange Journey - Roger Blythe
- 1947: Golden Earrings - Richard Byrd
- 1947: I Walk Alone - Charles (uncredited)
- 1948: But Not in Vain - Fred Van Nespen
- 1949: The Fool and the Princess - Harry Granville
- 1949: Celia: The Sinister Affair of Poor Aunt Nora - Larry Peters
- 1951: Tarzan's Peril - Warden (uncredited)
- 1951: Tales of Robin Hood - Alan-a-Dale
- 1951: Lorna Doone - Walt Snowe (uncredited)
- 1951: Secrets of Monte Carlo - British Inspector
- 1951: The Son of Dr. Jekyll - Daniels' Reporter (uncredited)
- 1952: The Pathfinder - Capt. Clint Bradford
- 1953: Rogue's March - Wilson (uncredited)
- 1953: Storm over Africa - Saxon
- 1954: King Richard and the Crusaders - Castelaine
- 1954: Charade - Capt. van Buren
- 1955: The Sea Chase - Petty Officer (uncredited)
- 1955: The Scarlet Coat - Col. Simcoe (uncredited)
- 1957: Something of Value - Physician - McKenzie Massacre (uncredited)
- 1957: The Seventh Sin - Allan (uncredited)
- 1958: Tarzan and the Trappers (TV Movie) - Commissioner Brandini (final film role)
