= Brian Nissen =

British actor (1927–2001)

- Born: 20 October 1927; London, UK
- Died: 8 February 2001 (aged 73); Salisbury, Wiltshire, UK

Brian Nissen (20 October 1927 in London – 8 February 2001 in Salisbury, Wiltshire) was a British actor and television continuity announcer.

== Biography ==
Nissen made an early appearance in Laurence Olivier's film of Shakespeare's Henry V, and made many TV, film and stage appearances, including The Dam Busters (1955), and the television series The New Adventures of Charlie Chan and Sword of Freedom in 1957. But he is probably best-remembered as an in-vision announcer for Southern Television, where his formal style seemed to sum up the company's aesthetic. He joined Southern at its inception in 1958 and stayed until its demise in 1981, and was kept on by the successor company TVS despite its general policy of breaking with Southern's conservatism. He retired from TVS in August 1987. Nissen died on 8 February 2001 in Salisbury, Wiltshire at the age of 73.

== Selected filmography ==
- The Day Will Dawn (1942) – Page (uncredited)
- The Demi-Paradise (1943) – George Tisdall
- English Without Tears (1944) – (uncredited)
- Henry V (1944) – Court – Soldier in the English Army
- They Were Sisters (1945) – John Watson
- Badger's Green (1949) – Dickie Wetherby
- Landfall (1949) – Lambert (uncredited)
- The Browning Version (1951) – Head Boy (uncredited)
- The Dam Busters (1955) – Flt / Lt. A. T. Taerum, D.F.C.
- Richard III (1955) – Messenger to Richard
- Interpol (1957) – Allison
- Second Fiddle (1957) – Jack Carter
- Top Floor Girl (1959) – Stevens Jr.
- Man Accused (1959) – Derek
- Night Train for Inverness (1960) – Police Radio Operator (uncredited)
- Dentist on the Job (1961) – City Gent
- The Fur Collar (1962) – Carl Jorgensen
- The Marked One (1963) – Chas Warren
- Ring of Spies (1964) – Lt. Downes (uncredited)
