= Lester Vail =

American actor

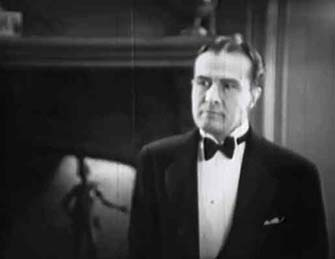
- Vail in Big Town (1932)
- Born: June 29, 1899; Denver, Colorado, U.S.
- Died: November 28, 1959 (aged 60); Los Angeles, California, U.S.
- Occupation: Actor
- Years active: 1919–1945

Lester Vail (June 29, 1899 – November 28, 1959) was an American actor of the stage, screen, and radio from the 1920s through the 1940s. In addition to acting in all three mediums, Vail also saw success as director on the Broadway stage, as well also being a producer of radio programs.

== Life and career ==
Born on June 29, 1899, in Denver, Colorado, Vail rose to prominence on the New York stage during the mid-1920s in the drama, Caught. Over the next ten years he appeared in over fifteen plays on the Great White Way; his more notable plays being Behold the Bridegroom, which ran in 1927 and 1928, written and directed by George Kelly, and 1934's Are You Decent?.

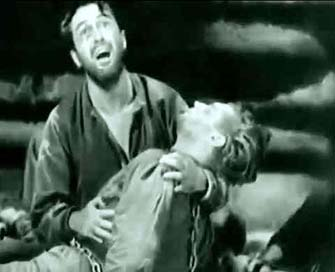
Vail and Ralph Forbes' characters await death in Beau Ideal (1931)

In 1931 he took a brief hiatus from the stage, focusing on performing in films. In the year he spent in Hollywood, Vail made eight films, with starring or featured roles in all but one of them. His film debut came in Beau Ideal, the 1931 sequel to the 1926 silent film, Beau Geste, starring alongside Frank McCormack and Ralph Forbes. Other notable films include starring roles in Dance, Fools, Dance (1931), with Joan Crawford; Victor Schertzinger's The Woman Between, which co-starred Lili Damita; and 1932's Big Town, directed by Arthur Hoerl. Other films in which he had a featured role included Consolation Marriage (1931), starring Irene Dunne and Pat O'Brien; and I Take This Woman, starring Gary Cooper and Carole Lombard.

After his short stint in films, Vail returned to the stage in 1932. He took another break from the stage in 1935, not returning until the war years of 1941–45, at which point he changed hats, directing, rather than acting. His biggest Broadway success as a director, was his last play, 1945's Chicken Every Sunday, by Julius and Philip Epstein. Beginning in the mid-1930s he entered a new medium: radio. From the 30s through the start of the 1950s, he acted and produced in that arena. He produced several shows for NBC, including Cyrano de Bergerac as part of the Great Plays series. Other shows he would produce for the Great Plays series included Captain Jinks of the Horse Marines, William Tell, and Elizabeth the Queen. Vail would also be one of the directors of the radio serial, The Aldrich Family, which ran from 1939 to 1953.

Late in his career, Vail made several appearances on episodic television, including performances on Perry Mason, Father Knows Best and The Donna Reed Show. Vail died on November 28, 1959, in Los Angeles, California.

== Filmography ==
(as per AFI's database)

- Beau Ideal (1931) as Otis Madison
- Consolation Marriage (1931) as Aubrey
- Dance, Fools, Dance (1931) as Bob Townsend
- I Take This Woman (1931) as Herbert Forrest
- It's a Wise Child (1931) as Roger Baldwin
- Murder by the Clock (1931) as Thomas Hollander
- The Woman Between (1931) as Victor Whitcomb
- Big Town (1932) as James Wyley
