= Violet E. Powell =

British screenwriter

- Occupation: Screenwriter
- Years active: 1925–1934
- Spouse: David Powell

Violet E. Powell was a British screenwriter active during the 1920s and 1930s. She was married to actor David Powell.

== Filmography ==
- The Beautiful City (1925)
- Just Suppose (1926)
- The White Black Sheep (1926)
- The Rolling Road (1927)
- Poppies of Flanders (1927)
- King's Mate (1928)
- Toni (1928)
- Paradise (1928)
- Kitty (1929)
- The Plaything (1929)
- The Girl in the Flat (1934)
- To Be a Lady (1934)
- Badger's Green (1934)
