= Farewell to Cinderella =

- Sebastian Smith, Arthur Rees, Anne Pichon and John Robinson in the film
- Directed by: Maclean Rogers
- Written by: Kathleen Butler; H. F. Maltby; Arthur Richardson; Maclean Rogers
- Produced by: A. George Smith
- Starring: Anne Pichon; John Robinson; Glennis Lorimer; Sebastian Smith
- Cinematography: Geoffrey Faithfull
- Production company: George Smith Productions
- Distributed by: RKO
- Release date: April 1937
- Running time: 64 minutes
- Country: United Kingdom
- Language: English

Farewell to Cinderella is a 1937 British romance film directed by Maclean Rogers and starring Anne Pichon, John Robinson and Glennis Lorimer. It was written by Kathleen Butler, H. F. Maltby, Arthur Richardson and Rogers.

== Preservation status ==
The British Film Institute National Archive holds a collection of stills but no film or video materials.

== Plot ==
Margaret Temperley is treated as little more than a servant by her family. When her father's uncle William arrives unexpectedly from Australia, the family, believing him to be wealthy, sponges on him. William, however, sees through this and realises that Margaret is the best of the bunch, and helps her to find happiness with Stephen Moreley, an artist who lodges with the family.

== Cast ==
- Anne Pichon as Margaret Temperley
- John Robinson as Stephen Moreley
- Glennis Lorimer as Betty Temperley
- Sebastian Smith as Andy Weir
- Arthur Rees as Uncle William
- Ivor Barnard as Mr. Temperley
- Margaret Damer as Mrs. Temperley
- Ena Grossmith as Emily

== Production ==
The film was made at the Nettlefold Studios in Walton-on-Thames as a quota quickie for release by the Hollywood firm RKO.

== Reception ==
The Monthly Film Bulletin wrote: "Domestic comedy which begins and ends weakly, with too much dialogue and insufficient action. ... Anne Pichon has the quiet charm necessary for the role of Margaret but not enough trouble has been taken to make the characters or plot convincing and, more important, really interesting."

Kine Weekly wrote: "The presentation is unpretentious, and the chracters are a trifle stilted and inclined to recite their lines until the film gets well under way. Nevertheless there is sufficient human interest and comedy to make this a pleasant second feature for family halls. ...The atmosphere of the ambitious suburban family is convincing enough, but it is some little time before the characters unbend, for which we probably have to blame the over burdened dialogue."

Picture Show wrote: "There is little to recommend this treacly, commonplace story ... The characters are unconvincing and direction uninspired."

The Daily Film Renter wrote: "The narrative is placid and uneventful, domestic comedy and sentiment being its principal ingredients, but it is moderately entertaining."
