= Boy Meets Girl (1938 film) =

1938 film

- Theatrical release poster
- Directed by: Lloyd Bacon
- Screenplay by: Bella Spewack; Sam Spewack
- Based on: Boy Meets Girl; 1935 play by Bella Spewack and Sam Spewack
- Produced by: Samuel Bischoff
- Starring: James Cagney; Pat O'Brien
- Cinematography: Sol Polito
- Edited by: William Holmes
- Production company: Warner Bros. Pictures
- Distributed by: Warner Bros. Pictures
- Release date: August 27, 1938
- Running time: 86 minutes
- Country: United States
- Language: English

Boy Meets Girl is a 1938 American screwball comedy film directed by Lloyd Bacon and starring James Cagney and Pat O'Brien. The supporting cast features Marie Wilson, Ralph Bellamy, Frank McHugh, Dick Foran and Ronald Reagan. The screenplay by Bella and Sam Spewack is based on their 1935 stage play of the same name, which ran for 669 performances on Broadway. The two zany screenwriters played by Cagney and O'Brien were based on Ben Hecht and Charles MacArthur, while Ralph Bellamy's part as the producer was based on Darryl Zanuck of 20th Century Fox.

== Plot ==
Two screenwriters, Law and Benson (James Cagney and Pat O'Brien), are in need of a story for cowboy star Larry Toms (Dick Foran). When studio waitress Susie Seabrook (Marie Wilson) faints in the office of producer C.F. Friday (Ralph Bellamy) because she is pregnant, the writers get an idea for a story about a cowboy and a baby, and cast Susie's unborn baby Happy in the part. The story will be the classic Hollywood tale: Boy meets girl, boy loses girl, boy gets girl. When they all leave to sell the idea to their boss, Susie meets and is intrigued by, Rodney Bowman (Bruce Lester), a good-looking young Englishman who is an extra on one of the studio's films.

Larry is tired of having a scene-stealing baby as a co-star, and his agent, Rossetti (Frank McHugh), devises a scheme to have Larry woo Susie in order to marry her and, as Happy's father, get him out of show business and into a normal life. When they hear about this, Benson and Law hire Rodney, unaware that Susie knows him, to pretend to be Susie's long-lost husband, Happy's father; Rodney thinks it's just an acting job, and is not in on the deception. Their plan works, and Larry disavows any planned future with Susie, but an unwanted result is that Baby Happy is fired due to the scandal.

When their plot is exposed, the two writers are fired, and Law makes plans to move to Vermont to suffer and write the Great American Novel, but Benson, whose wife has just left him, is too deep in debt to leave - so they come up with another plan. They have a friend in London send a wire to B.K. (Pierre Watkin), the head of the studio, with an offer from a British studio to buy it, as long as Baby Happy is under contract. Under the circumstances, Happy, Benson and Law are all re-hired.

Just then, Rodney bursts into the office and asks Susie to marry him and come to England. Benson and Law try to persuade Susie that Rodney is a no-good cheat and philanderer only after her money, but the American representative of the British studio shows up to identify him as the son of an English lord. The rep also reveals that the plan to purchase the studio is a fraud. Producer C.F. wants to fire Benson and Law again, but their new contracts are iron-clad. Susie leaves with Rodney, heading for England, and C.F. learns that his wife is pregnant.

== Cast ==
- James Cagney as Robert Law
- Pat O'Brien as J. Carlyle "J.C." Benson
- Marie Wilson as Mrs. Susan "Susie" Seabrook
- Ralph Bellamy as C. Elliott "C.F." Friday
- Frank McHugh as Rossetti, Larry's agent
- Dick Foran as Larry Toms
- Bruce Lester as Rodney Bowman
- Ronald Reagan as radio announcer at premiere
- Paul Clark as Happy
- Penny Singleton as Peggy
- Dennie Moore as Miss Crews
- Harry Seymour as Slade, a songwriter
- Bert Hanlon as Green, a songwriter
- James Stephenson as Major Thompson
- Pierre Watkin as B.K. Whitacre, the head of the studio

== Production ==
According to The Hollywood Reporter Marion Davies was originally considered to play Susie. The media has speculated on several reasons for the change in casting. One is that Davies' lover, William Randolph Hearst, rejected the film for Davies because he thought it was too racy for her. Another is that Hearst rejected the film because his Cosmopolitan Productions was severing relations with Warner Bros. Another possible reason is that Davies rejected the role herself, upset with cast changes for the film or with the size of her part. In any case, Davies did not do the picture, and never made another film.

Boy Meets Girl was Cagney's eighth picture with comedy-specialist director Lloyd Bacon, out of the nine they would eventually make together; it was also Pat O'Brien's eighth out of an eventual ten with Bacon, and the fifth of nine to pair Cagney and O'Brien. Cagney, O'Brien, their Boy Meet Girl co-stars Ralph Bellamy and Frank McHugh, along with Spencer Tracy and Frank Morgan, called themselves "The Boys Club" and had dinner together on Thursday nights.

In the scene which takes place at a glitzy Hollywood movie premiere, with Ronald Reagan – newly signed to Warner Bros. – playing the radio announcer, the name of the film is given as The White Rajah, starring Errol Flynn. This was the name of a script actually written by Flynn, but rejected for production as being too weak. Supposedly, Flynn was not happy with the in-joke.

== Reception ==
Reviewers at the time of release thought that the requirements of the Hays Office censors regarding Susie's pregnancy caused the satire of the original play to be less effective in the film.

== Radio adaptation ==
Boy Meets Girl was presented on Old Gold Comedy Theatre May 20, 1945. The 30-minute adaptation starred Ann Sothern, Chester Morris, and Lee Tracy.
