= Big Town (1932 film) =

1932 film

- Directed by: Arthur Hoerl
- Written by: Arthur Hoerl
- Produced by: Arthur Hoerl
- Starring: Lester Vail; Frances Dade; John Miltern
- Cinematography: Nick Rogalli
- Edited by: Jack Miner
- Production company: Trojan Pictures
- Distributed by: Trojan Pictures
- Release date: December 20, 1932
- Running time: 57 minutes
- Country: United States
- Language: English

Big Town is a 1932 American crime film directed by Arthur Hoerl and starring Lester Vail, Frances Dade and John Miltern. It was made by Hoerl's own Trojan Pictures in New York City along with another film The Shadow Laughs. A second feature, it was distributed in Britain by Universal Pictures.

== Plot ==
A hard-drinking newspaper reporter plans to pay criminal for information about the mob, but finds the man murdered when he gets to the rendezvous.

== Cast ==
- Lester Vail as James Wyley
- Frances Dade as Patricia Holman
- John Miltern as Frederick Holman
- Geoffrey Bryant as Bob Reilly
- Edith Broder as Mrs. Reilly
- Diane Bori as Etheline
- Alan Brooks as Chalmers
- Bernard Randall as Deipp
- Tom Hoirer as Knight
- A.J. Herbert as Butler
- Shannon Day as Telephone Operator
- Herschel Mayall as Banker
- James La Curto as Jose Romero
- Walter Armin as Tony Figaro
- Glorian Gray as Sob Sister
- Eddie Bauer as Manigan

== Bibliography ==
- D'Ambrosio, Brian. Montana Entertainers: Famous and Almost Forgotten. Arcadia Publishing, 2019.
- Koszarski, Richard. Hollywood on the Hudson: Film and Television in New York from Griffith to Sarnoff. Rutgers University Press, 2008.
- Langman, Larry & Finn, Daniel. A Guide to American Crime Films of the Thirties. Greenwood Press, 1995.
