= Badger's Green (1949 film) =

British comedy by John Irwin

- Directed by: John Irwin
- Written by: William Fairchild; R.C. Sherriff (play)
- Produced by: John Croydon; Adrian D. Worker
- Starring: Barbara Murray; Brian Nissen; Garry Marsh
- Cinematography: Walter J. Harvey
- Edited by: Gordon Pilkington
- Music by: Malcolm Arnold
- Production company: Highbury Productions
- Distributed by: General Film Distributors
- Release date: 28 February 1949
- Running time: 62 minutes
- Country: United Kingdom
- Language: English

Badger's Green is a 1949 British comedy film directed by John Irwin and starring Barbara Murray, Brian Nissen, Garry Marsh and Kynaston Reeves.

It is based on the play Badger's Green by R.C. Sheriff, which had previously been turned into a 1934 film of the same title. It was shot at Highbury Studios and released as a second feature by the Rank Organisation, on the same bill as Eureka Stockade. The film's sets were designed by Don Russell.

== Synopsis ==
A company plans a massive development in the quiet village of Badger's Green, angering the existing inhabitants. It is eventually agreed that the outcome of the dispute will be settled by a local cricket match.

== Main cast ==
- Barbara Murray as Jane Morton
- Brian Nissen as Dickie Wetherby
- Garry Marsh as Major Forrester
- Kynaston Reeves as Doctor Wetherby
- Laurence Naismith as Mr Butler
- Mary Merrall as Mrs Wetherby
- Clifford Buckton as Sergeant Foster
- Stuart Latham as PC Percy
- Lionel Murton as Albert
- Jack McNaughton as Mr Twigg
- Norman Pierce as Sam Rogers
- Ethel Ramsey as Mrs Rogers
- Patrick Troughton as Jim Carter
- Sam Kydd as Harry Parker

== Reception ==
The Monthly Film Bulletin wrote: "Although it drags at times, this film is quite entertaining, the acting is competent and the dialogue, with both sarcasm and caustic wit, is amusing. There is a little romance included and an exciting, but far too lengthy, cricket match in which Mr. Butler saves the day. Photography and production are good, and there are some beautiful country settings."

== Bibliography ==
- Chibnall, Steve & McFarlane, Brian. The British 'B' Film. Palgrave MacMillan, 2009.
