= William Hamilton (film editor) =

American film editor

- Born: November 11, 1893; Pennsylvania, U.S.
- Died: August 3, 1942 (aged 48); North Hollywood, U.S.

William Hamilton (November 11, 1893 – August 3, 1942) was an American film editor whose career spanned three decades. His credits include Cimarron (1931), Morning Glory (1933), The Gay Divorcee (1934), Roberta (1935), Top Hat (1935), Stage Door (1937), The Hunchback of Notre Dame (1939) and Suspicion (1941).

Hamilton was born in Pennsylvania and died in North Hollywood.

== Partial filmography ==
- The Bright Shawl (1923)
- The Fighting Blade (1923)
- The Enchanted Cottage (1924)
- Classmates (1924)
- Soul-Fire (1925)
- Shore Leave (1925)
- The Beautiful City (1925)
- Nell Gwyn (1926)
- Annie Laurie (1927)
- Captain Salvation (1927)
- The Road to Romance (1927)
- Wickedness Preferred (1928)
- Forbidden Hours (1928)
- Our Dancing Daughters (1928)
- The Flying Marine (1929)
- The Lone Wolf's Daughter (1929)
- Street Girl (1929)
- Rio Rita (1929)
- The Faker (1929)
- Hit the Deck (1930)
- Dixiana (1930)
- The Rampant Age (1930)
- Cimarron (1931)
- The Woman Between (1931)
- Friends and Lovers (1931)
- Are These Our Children? (1931)
- The Lost Squadron (1932)
- Hell's Highway (1932)
- Topaze (1933)
- Diplomaniacs (1933)
- Before Dawn (1933)
- Morning Glory (1933)
- After Tonight (1933)
- Keep 'Em Rolling (1934)
- The Crime Doctor (1934)
- His Greatest Gamble (1934)
- Their Big Moment (1934)
- The Gay Divorcee (1934)
- The Little Minister (1934)
- Roberta (1935)
- Top Hat (1935)
- Winterset (1936)
- Shall We Dance (1937)
- Super-Sleuth (1937)
- Stage Door (1937)
- Having Wonderful Time (1938)
- Carefree (1938)
- The Story of Vernon and Irene Castle (1939)
- In Name Only (1939)
- Fifth Avenue Girl (1939)
- The Hunchback of Notre Dame (1939)
- Primrose Path (1940)
- Tom Brown's School Days (1940)
- Too Many Girls (1940)
- Mr. & Mrs. Smith (1941)
- Unexpected Uncle (1941)
- Suspicion (1941)
- The Big Street (1942)
