= Badger's Green (1934 film) =

1934 film by Adrian Brunel

- Directed by: Adrian Brunel
- Written by: R.J. Davis; Violet E. Powell
- Based on: Badger's Green by R.C. Sherriff
- Starring: Valerie Hobson; Bruce Lester; David Horne; Sebastian Smith
- Production company: British & Dominions Film Corporation
- Distributed by: Paramount British Pictures
- Release date: September 1934
- Running time: 68 minutes
- Country: United Kingdom
- Language: English

Badger's Green is a 1934 British comedy film directed by Adrian Brunel and starring Valerie Hobson, Bruce Lester, David Horne and Wally Patch. It was adapted by R.J. Davis and Violet E. Powell from the 1930 play Badger's Green by R.C. Sheriff. It was produced by the British & Dominions Film Corporation at their Elstree Studios as a quota quickie for distribution by Paramount Pictures.

The story was remade as the 1949 film Badger's Green.

== Preservation status ==
The British Film Institute has classed Badger's Green as a lost film, included in its "75 Most Wanted" list. The BFI National Archive holds a collection of ephemera and stills but no film or video materials.

== Plot ==
A picturesque village is threatened with redevelopment by a speculative builder, leading to widespread protest. In the end the builder agrees to settle the future of the village on the result of a cricket match.

== Cast ==
- Valerie Hobson as Molly Butler
- Bruce Lester as Dickie Wetherby
- David Horne as Major Forrester
- Sebastian Smith as Mr Twigg
- John Turnbull as Thomas Butler
- Wally Patch as Mr Rogers
- Frank Moore as Dr Wetherby
- Elsie Irving as Mrs Wetherby

== Reception ==
Kine Weekly wrote: "Homely comedy drama of English village lite, adapted from a play by R. C. Sherriff, of Journey's End fame. The story, rich in shrewd observation, rotates around cricket, our national game, and finds its healthy entertainment in its brilliant gallery of local types, all flawlessly drawn by an experienced cast. The screen gives the original play that scope denied it on the stage, and the result is a delightful picture of English life that cannot fail to bring inestimable pleasure to all classes."

The Daily Film Renter wrote: "Amusing but simple story of village life ... Development, along satirical lines, concentrates on local politics and cricket match to decide threat of big building scheme. Unpretentious, but capably directed, while typical studies of retired major and village doctor are given by David Horne and Frank Moore respectively. Pleasant popular entertainment."

Picturegoer wrote: "The plot of this picture is as simple as it is effective. ... As the doctor, Frank Moore gives a notable characterisation, but the crux of the picture is David Horne's vivid portrayal of the fiery and obstinate major."
