= Sebastian Smith =

British actor (1869–1948)

- Born: 3 October 1869; Southwell, England
- Died: 15 January 1948 (aged 78)

Sebastian Smith (3 October 1869 – 15 January 1948) was a British stage and film actor. He was born in Southwell, Nottinghamshire.

== Filmography ==
- Rescued by Rover (1905)
- Prehistoric Peeps (1905)
- The Tramp's Dream (1906)
- The Blue Carbuncle (1923)
- White Cargo (1929)
- A Man of Mayfair (1931)
- Tilly of Bloomsbury (1931)
- Love Lies (1931)
- The Double Event (1934)
- Virginia's Husband (1934)
- Badger's Green (1934)
- Public Nuisance No. 1 (1936)
- Oh, Mr Porter! (1937)
- London Melody (1937)
- Farewell to Cinderella (1937)
- Beauty and the Barge (1937)
- Museum Mystery (1937)
- Where's That Fire? (1940)
