= The Girl in the Flat =

- Stewart Rome, Belle Chrystall and Jane Millican in the film
- Directed by: Redd Davis
- Written by: Violet E. Powell
- Produced by: Redd Davis
- Starring: Stewart Rome; Belle Chrystall; Vera Bogetti; Jane Millican
- Cinematography: Percy Strong
- Production companies: British and Dominions Film Corporation; Paramount British Productions
- Distributed by: Paramount British Pictures
- Release date: June 1934
- Running time: 65 minutes
- Country: United Kingdom
- Language: English

The Girl in the Flat is a 1934 British crime film directed by Redd Davis and starring Stewart Rome, Belle Chrystall, Vera Bogetti and Jane Millican. It was written by Violet E. Powell.

== Preservation status ==
The British Film Institute National Archive holds a collection of ephemera and stills but no film or video materials.

== Plot ==
Country girl Mavis Tremayne attends a wild London party at which a man is murdered. She is incriminated by blackmail, but, her fiancé Sir John Waterton, a King's Counsel, proves her innocence.

== Cast ==
- Stewart Rome as Sir John Waterton
- Belle Chrystall as Mavis Tremayne
- Vera Bogetti as Girda Long
- Jane Millican as Kitty Fellows
- John Turnbull as Inspector Grice
- Noell Shannon as Major Cull

== Reception ==
Kine Weekly wrote: "Loosely constructed, but kept in fairly even dramatic continuity by the natural acting of Belle Crystal in the lead. The artificiality of the story is exposed by the weak ending, and the supporting players are, with few exceptions, unable to cloak this shortcoming. It is the star alone who makes the film sufficiently entertaining to get by for quota purposes."

The Daily Film Renter wrote: "Vera Boggetti [sic], as the heroine's alleged friend, and, incidentally, the murderess, makes a hit with a diverting brand of nonchalance, Belle Chrystall is a conventional leading lady, while Stewart Rome overacts considerably as the K.C. John Turnbull gives his customary 'Yard' man study."

Picture Show wrote: "The methods of blackmailing are to say the least of it numerous and somewhat unconvincing. Belle Chrystal as Mavis gives an excellent performance. Stewart Rome as Sir John rather overacts his part. Vera Boggetti as Girda gives quite a good performance."

Picturegoer wrote: "Loosely constructed and artificial story in which Belle Chrystal ... gives an intelligent performance which helps in some measure to bring some credibility to the plot."
