= Horace Hodges =

English actor (1863–1951)

- Born: 19 December 1863; Falmouth, Cornwall, England
- Died: 6 July 1951 (aged 87); Sussex, England
- Occupations: Actor & writer

Horace Hodges (19 December 1863 – 6 July 1951) was a British stage and film actor and writer.

Hodges was the author (with Thomas Wigney Percyval) of the play Grumpy which saw a Broadway production in 1913, a silent film version in 1923, and a sound version in 1930, with a Spanish film version Cascarrabias in the same year.

== Selected filmography ==
- Escape (1930) - Gentleman
- Other People's Sins (1931) - Carfax
- A Night in Montmartre (1931) - Lucien Borell
- After Dark (1932) - Thaddeus Cattermole Brompton
- Summer Lightning (1933) - Lord Emsworth
- Rolling in Money (1934) - Earl of Addleton
- Summer Lightning (1933) - Johnnie Lee
- Old Faithful (1935) - Bill Brunning
- Birds of a Feather (1936) - Lord Cheverton
- Three Maxims (1936) - Mike
- London Melody (1937) - Father Donnelly
- The Show Goes On (1937) - Sam Bishop
- Follow Your Star (1938) - Mr. Wilmot
- Jamaica Inn (1939) - Chadwick - Sir Humphrey's Butler (final film role)
